= List of Angelito cast and characters =

This is a list of characters from the Angelito.

== Main characters ==
=== Angelito Santos ===
(Played by JM De Guzman)

Angelito Santos is the titular character and main protagonist.

Batang Ama: Angelito is an 18-year-old high school teen who was born to a dysfunctional family and repeats a year level. He is one of Rosalie's suitors, being the more persistent, which eventually formed their friendship. His life however changes when Rosalie becomes pregnant. After his son is born, Angelito strives harder to become a good father to the child.

Bagong Yugto: It is shown that all his hard works have paid off and he becomes wealthy. At the ending, he buys a huge house for his family, where he, Rosalie, Junjun, Pinang, Mervin, and Tere all live.

=== Rosalie Dimaano-Santos ===
(Played by Charee Pineda)

Rosalie Catalan Dimaano the second child and the first daughter of the Dimaanos

In Batang Ama Rosalie is an obedient and respectful child who is groomed as the family's newest breadwinner due to her intelligence and wisdom. Even though she shunned her suitors and studied earnestly, she accepted Angelito despite the opposition of the family. Her pregnancy dismays her family and Angelito's family, causing friction between the families. Her elopement with Angelito helps her give birth away from all her family's problems and upon their return home, she finished her education. She later becomes a flight attendant which attracts Andrew Posadas, whom she starts her relationship with. After she breaks up with him, she reunites with Angelito and Junjun and live a normal family life.

Bagong Yugto reveals that Rosalie marries Angelito and lives a happy life with him. During her tenure as a teacher, she later attracts Larry Samaniego, a wealthy businessman who is secretly a smuggler. In the end, she lives in the new house purchased by Angelito for his family.

=== Angelito "Junjun" Dimaano-Santos, Jr ===
(Played by Joshen Bernardo)

Angelito Dimaano Santos Jr, nicknamed as "Junjun" is the first child of the Dimaano-Santos couple.

He was first introduced in Batang Ama when Rosalie gives birth to him during her and Angelito's elopement in the countryside.

Bagong Yugto reveals that he lives a happy family life with his parents Rosalie and Angelito.

== Dimaano Family ==
=== Adel and Delfin Dimaano ===
(played by Snooky Serna and Al Tantay) Adel and Delfin are the heads of the Dimaano household in the series.

In Batang Ama, the first Dimaano parent to be introduced is Delfin, who works as a security guard. Delfin's dream of becoming a doctor did not materialize as he earlier had a family. Adel works as a domestic helper in Saudi Arabia but later returns home after an employer of hers unjustly accused her of theft wherein the employer's wife and children purchased her trip home.

=== Rolan Dimaano ===
(Played by Matt Evans)

Rolan Catalan Dimaano is the first child and only son of the Dimaano family

In Batang Ama Rolan is the family's delinquent child due to his troublesome habits. He, just like Angelito, is a repeater and is a close friend of the title character. Rosalie's pregnancy causes him to become violent towards Angelito, which is first evidenced by beating him during a confrontation. Upon Angelito and Rosalie's return from elopement, his hatred is fueled and he nearly kills Tere in a house fire, which he instigates. Charged with arson, he is imprisoned and is left behind as the Dimaanos move out of San Vicente to start anew. Rolan is then moved to New Bilibid Prison for five years where he experienced more harm from his fellow prisoners. He is released by Andrew Posadas, who has vouched for him, and gets a job at a mall, starting first in the warehouse but is later fired due to alleged theft. Despite all those, his hatred for Angelito never stops, evidenced when he frightens Junjun with threats on his first visit to the Dimaano household. Rolan also blames Junjun for the Dimaano's problems and seeks out plans to eliminate him and Junjun: the first being running over Junjun with a motorcycle while the second being a botched hostage taking, both of which end in failure. He is imprisoned at the end of the series.

Bagong Yugto: Does not appear

- Kaye Abad as Jenny Ambrosio
- Tom Rodriguez as Andrew Posadas

== Supporting ==
- Elizabeth Oropesa as Amparo "Pinang" Santos
- Devon Seron as Teresa "Tere" Santos
- Sue Ramirez as Rona Dimaano
- Eliza Pineda as Rowena Dimaano
- Mariel Pamintuan as Rachel Dimaano
- Joshen Bernardo as Angelito "Jun-jun" Dimaano Santos Jr.
- Bea Basa as Malena Mhaica Emily "Mai-Mai" Ambrosio
- Felix Roco as Spongky
- Sam Concepcion as Migoy Abella
- Dennis Padilla as Fulgencio "Pol" Dela Torre
- Jason Francisco as Mervin
- Beauty Gonzales as Seksi
- Josef Elizalde as Charlotte
- Lemuel Pelayo as Arthur
- Jobelle Salvador as Lina Abella
- Matthew Mendoza as Raymond Abella
- Kyra Custodio as Juret Villaflor
- Aldred Gatchalian as Rodel Dimaano

== See also ==
IMDB Full Cast & Crew
