= Angelito =

Angelito may refer to:

== People ==
- Angelito (wrestler) (born 1995), Mexican professional wrestler
- Angelito Gatlabayan (born 1952), Filipino politician
- Angelito Lampon (born 1950), Filipino Catholic prelate and Archbishop of Cotabato
- Angelito Sarmiento (1947–2015), Filipino politician
- Lito Sisnorio (1982–2007), Filipino boxer who died during a bout
- Angelito Azteca, another ring name of Super Muñequito, Mexican retired masked professional wrestler (born 1966)

== Television series ==
- Angelito: Batang Ama, Filipino TV series about under-aged fatherhood
- Angelito (TV series), a Filipino daytime drama series

== Songs ==
- "Angelito" (Aventura song), 2005
- "Angelito" (Don Omar song), 2006
- "Angelito" (René y René song), 1964

== See also ==
- "Tu Angelito", a 2010 song by Chino & Nacho
