= Maalaala Mo Kaya season 20 =

Maalaala Mo Kaya
- Season 20
- Starring: Charo Santos
- No. of episodes: 57

Release
- Original network: ABS-CBN
- Original release: October 1, 2011 – December 29, 2012

Season chronology
- ← Previous; Season 19 Next → Season 21

Maalaala Mo Kaya (transl. Would you remember?; abbreviated MMK), also known as Memories in English, is a Filipino television series, which was first aired on May 15, 1991. MMK is the longest-running drama anthology on Philippine television.

== Episodes ==
#	Episode title	Directed by	Written by	Original air date
1	"Tungkod"	Brillante Mendoza	Ruel Montañez; Arah Jell Badayos	October 1, 2011
Cast: Angel Aquino, Yul Servo, Maria Isabel Lopez
2	"Tap Dancing Shoes"	Dado C. Lumibao	Joan Habana; Arah Jell Badayos	October 8, 2011
Cast: John Prats, Nash Aguas, Ariel Rivera
3	"Susi"	Dado C. Lumibao	Benjamin Benson Logronio; Arah Jell Badayos	October 15, 2011
Cast: Jake Cuenca, Ricky Davao, Vivian Velez
4	"Liham"	Jerry Lopez Sineneng	Mary Rose Colindres; Arah Jell Badayos	October 22, 2011
Cast: KC Concepcion, Paulo Avelino, Dina Bonnevie
5	"Passbook"	Nuel C. Naval	Maan Dimaculangan; Arah Jell Badayos	October 29, 2011
Cast: Rio Locsin, Toru Nagahashi, Desiree del Valle
6	"Tulay" "Bridge"	Dado C. Lumibao	Joan Habana	November 5, 2011
Cast: Rica Peralejo, Ara Mina, Archie Alemania, Biboy Ramirez, Trina Legaspi, Patrick Sugui, Dexter Doria, Bing Davao, Racquel Montesa
7	"Manok" "Chicken"	Jerry Lopez-Sineneng	Joan Habana	November 26, 2011
Cast: Precious Lara Quigaman, Sylvia Sanchez, Kathleen Hermosa, Dionne Monsanto, Gerald Madrid, Lui Villaruz, Lui Manansala, Khaycee Aboloc
8	"Niagara Falls"	Dado C. Lumibao	Arah Jell Badayos	December 10, 2011 (reaired on September 17, 2022)
A story of a woman named Juana who not only fought for her family's dream but also defended the rights of her fellow hardworking caregivers in Canada. Discover how the 'hero' behind the existing "Juana Tejada Law" in Canada managed to stand up for her countrymen as she battled with colon cancer. Through her advocacy, Juana was able to help change legislation affecting caregivers applying for permanent residency in Canada. Cast: Maricar Reyes, Dimples Romana, Tom Rodriguez, Patrick Guzman
9	"Langis" "Oil"	Wenn V. Deramas	Benson Logronio	December 17, 2011
Cast: Joseph Marco, Jimmy Santos, Susan Africa, Nikki Bagaporo, Makisig Morales, Barbie Sabino, Neil Ryan Sese, Racquel Villavicencio, Crispin Pineda, Elaine Quemuel, Jovic Susim
10	"Ensaymada" "Brioche"	Dado C. Lumibao	Ruel Montañez	January 7, 2012
Witness in the story the exceptional strong father-and-daughter bond between Ete and Dang, especially when Ete became mentally ill. During their family's difficult times, it was Dang who stood by her father even if her mother was already giving up. Cast: Phillip Salvador, Kathryn Bernardo, Snooky Serna, Janus Del Prado, Alexa Ilacad, Ogie Escanilla, Kristoff Meneses
11	"Saklay" "Crutches"	Mae Czarina R. Cruz	Benjamin Benson Logronio	January 14, 2012
The inspiring story of Jeff and Kurt Bringas or better known as the Bringas Brothers, the 3rd place winners of Pilipinas Got Talent Season 3. The episode narrates the struggle the brothers had to go through to achieve their dreams. Witness how Jeff gave up everything in order to help his younger brother gain his self-esteem back after his left leg was amputated after being diagnosed with bone cancer. Viewers will also get to see how music moved them to reach their goals, despite disappointment and rejections. Cast: Rayver Cruz, Rodjun Cruz, Valerie Concepcion, Nash Aguas, Ismael Clavero, Allan Paule, Melissa Mendez, Linn Oeymo, Laisa Comia, Angel Sy, Jobelle Salvador, Raul Montessa
12	"Sumpak" "Firearm"	Nuel C. Naval	Arah Jell Badayos	January 21, 2012
A special Maalaala Mo Kaya episode of a ruthless assassin. Randy who was in dire need of money for his younger brother's hospital bills and expensive medication. Although his family is against his source of living, he eventually enjoyed the thrill of his job and the huge pay that comes with it. But his perspective changes when he falls in love with a prostitute named Joyce. He then dreams of becoming a better person by living a normal life and being content as a street vendor. Cast: Piolo Pascual, Shaina Magdayao, Julio Diaz, Daria Ramirez, Lloyd Zaragoza, Jommy Teotico
13	"Singsing" "Ring"	Dado C. Lumibao	Mark Angos	January 28, 2012
A family drama episode of a mother named Tita, a devoted wife and mother who pursued working as a field health worker to support her family. Her job took a toll on Tita's life when she discovered her husband's infidelity, which later on led to their marriage's annulment. Things got worse for Tita when she lost the custody of her children. Cast: Pokwang, Gardo Versoza, Izzy Canillo, Cheska Billiones, Jacob Dionisio, Perla Bautista, Dexter Doria, Marissa Sanchez
14	"Journal"	Raz de la Torre	Joan Habana	February 4, 2012
The story of Nono and Joie, best friends who eventually became lovers. But their happiness will be cut short when both their parents did not support their relationship. But Nono stepped out and proved his love for Joie, prompting Joie to face her fear and believe everything Nono had promised. Cast: Sam Milby, Jessy Mendiola, Lito Pimentel, Mickey Ferriols, Aldred Gatchalian, Laureen Uy, Beauty Gonzalez, Hiyasmin Neri, Hermes Bautista, Gileth Sandico, William Lorenzo
15	"Gayuma" "Love Potion"	Lino S. Cayetano	Joan Habana	February 11, 2012
The popular quote 'True love conquers all' will be proven true in the love story of a half Korean-half Pinoy named Lenny and his conquest in pursuing his love for Yvonne. After being turned down several times, Lenny's persistence when Yvonne became his girlfriend. Just when Lenny thought everything was going well for both of them, he proposed to Yvonne thinking that she would be willing to marry him. Yvonne did accept his proposal but three days before their wedding, she got cold feet and ran away. Frustrated, Lenny sought the help of a witch doctor to make Yvonne fall for him through a love potion. Cast: Alfred Vargas, Bianca Manalo, Rio Locsin, Bembol Roco, Richard Yap, Bea Nicolas, Alfred Labatos, Mark Sayarot, Wendy Valdez, Joyce So
16	"Kamaó" "Fist"	Dado C. Lumibao	Benson Logronio	February 18, 2012
Ramon, an underground boxer who grew up as a battered child. At the time when Ramon has decided to change his way of living, unfortunate events will force him to commit crimes that will enrage his family. Cast: Coco Martin, Jodi Sta. Maria, Philip Nolasco, BJ Forbes, Celine Lim, Veyda Innoval, Michael Roy Jornales, Carlos Morales, Levi Ignacio, Andrei Garcia, Aleck Bovick, Mike Lloren
17	"Belo" "Veil"	Raz de la Torre	Arah Jell Badayos	February 25, 2012
The story Jane, a nurse who stood up for her faith and became a nun despite her family's disapproval. But Jane eventually left the convent to marry the man she unexpectedly fell in love with. Unfortunately, Jane's faith will be tested with her husband's infidelity. Cast: Vina Morales, Mark Gil, Gina Pareño, Boots Anson-Roa, Mikylla Ramirez, Sharlene San Pedro, Menggie Cobarubbias, Tess Antonio, Eda Nolan, Almira Muhlach, Khaycee Aboloc, Patrick Sugui, Johan Santos.
18	"School Uniform"	Dado C. Lumibao	Arah Jell Badayos	March 3, 2012
A heavy family drama episode of the story of husband and wife Toto and Josephine who did everything provide for their family. Fate challenges Josephine's strength as a wife and a mother as the lives of her children go astray. While Toto wanted to let go of their responsibilities to their children who failed them, Josephine remained the 'light' of their family and a champion mother who gave her unconditional love to all her kids. Cast: Christopher de Leon, Sandy Andolong, Lauren Young, Edgar Allan Guzman, Bettina Carlos, Jairus Aquino, Maggie dela Riva, Randolf Stametelaky, Fred Payawan, Devon Seron
19	"Cross-stitch"	Nuel Naval	Maan Dimaculangan	March 10, 2012
Liza, a woman who got into an unconventional affair with a man named Egay who was paired with her by a dying friend, who was incidentally Egay's wife. Eay was reluctant at first but decided to respect his wife's dying wish. Liza was also doubtful but accepted Egay because of her lingering fear of ending up as an old spinster. Cast: Iza Calzado, Zanjoe Marudo, Rica Peralejo, Deborah Sun, Minnie Aguilar, Lassy
20	"Panyô" "Handkerchief"	Mervyn Brondial	Joan Habana	March 17, 2012
A charming story about 12-year-olds Justin and Nikko whose friendship is put to the test when they both fall in love with Rio. The two boys decide to compete with each other, doing all sorts of tricks just to impress the girl. At first, Justin is confident that Rio feels the same way for him. But things get out of hand as Rio turns him down in favor of Nikko. Cast: Nash Aguas, Mika dela Cruz, Paul Salas, Yayo Aguila, Bobby Andrews, Nikki Bagaporo, Basty Alcanses, Arnold Reyes
21	"Kalendaryo" "Calendar"	Nuel C. Naval	Benson Logronio	March 24, 2012
A heavy drama episode about the Chavez Sisters. Pauleen Chavez, a blind woman suffering from a brain tumor is faced with problems but keep struggling, strive harder and remain optimistic despite all the hardships they are faced with. Cast: Kim Chiu, Miles Ocampo, Anya Aguilar, Ana Capri, John Arcilla, Lui Manansala, Duday, Jaycee Parker
22	"Shorts"	Lino S. Cayetano	Arah Jell Badayos	March 31, 2012
The story of two best friends Meynard and Raymund who have always dreamed of riding a ship and exploring the world together. When they finally had the chance to fulfill their ambition, Meynard and Raymund's dream turned into a nightmare after the ship's crewmen threw them out in the sea and left them afloat for 17 hours. Cast: John Manalo, Francis Magundayao, Emilio Garcia, Daisy Reyes, Nikka Valencia, Kyle Balili, Raye Barquirin, Hanna Flores, Jerome Ventinilla, Elijah Magundayao.
23	"Polo Shirt"	Nuel C. Naval	Benson Logronio	April 14, 2012
The life story of a gay named Bonsai and his quest for acceptance. After finally having the guts to admit to his family that he is gay, Bonsai left for Manila to live the life that he had always wanted and forget the pains that his family has given him. As he enjoys the freedom of expressing his sexuality, Bonsai became shocked and terrified with the sight of his youngest sister Lencie (Trina Legaspi) as a lesbian. Cast: Janus Del Prado, Trina Legaspi, Sharmaine Suarez, Gloria Sevilla, CJ Navato, Ismael Clavero, Kyline Alcantara, Jong Cuenco, Jubail Andres, Amante Pulido, Simon Ibarra
24	"T-Shirt"	Don M. Cuaresma	Marie Ann Dimaculangan-Fampulme	April 21, 2012
Gigi, a young child who had to sacrifice her dreams and her studies and work as a maid because of poverty. Gigi's dreams turned into a nightmare when she was raped repeatedly by her employer. Unfortunately, she got pregnant and had to face difficulties of being a young mother. Cast: Sharlene San Pedro, Justin Cuyugan, Cherry Lou, Joy So, Chienna Roseph Filomeno, Edrilyn Ocampo, Dante Rivero
25	"Kape" "Coffee"	Nuel C. Naval	Joan Habana	April 28, 2012
This week's episode is about the misery that a battered wife had to go through the process of annulment. In the story, Michelle filed an annulment case against her husband who was always beating her throughout their marriage. While dealing with this ordeal, she met a lawyer named David who, like her, just came out of a bad relationship. As both struggle with their own failed romance, Michelle and David found themselves falling for each other. Cast: Dimples Romana, Ian De Leon, Slater Young, Lloyd Zaragoza, Madz Nicolas, Soliman Cruz, Kaye Miranda, Charles Christianson, Alyanna Angeles
26	"Kwintas" "Necklace"	Don M. Cuaresma	Joan Habana	May 5, 2012
Despite finally meeting her 'one great love,' Mariz had to let Nonit go because she has to fulfill her promise to her siblings that she will not get married unless all of them have already graduated from college. After parting ways, Mariz found out that Nonit got married. Since she could not imagine herself to be with any other guy, Mariz remained single even after her siblings have already graduated. Just when Mariz thought she was meant to be an old maid, fate will let her meet Nonit again. Cast: Aiko Melendez, Jomari Yllana, Bernadette Allyson, Dexter Doria, Daria Ramirez, Debraliz Velasote, Bodjie Pascua, Yda Yaneza, Nene Tamayo, DM Sevilla, Jessica Connely, Buddy Palad, Koreen Medina
27	"Baunan" "Lunch box"	Ruel Santos Bayani	Maan Dimaculangan-Fampulme	May 12, 2012
A Mother's Day presentation. Adelaida, who almost had a perfect marriage with her husband Onofre (Al Tantay) except for one thing missing: their own child. Eager to raise one, they both decided to adopt not only one but five children. Cast: Cherry Pie Picache, Al Tantay, Melai Cantiveros, Martin del Rosario, Devon Seron, Carlo Lacana, Sue Anna Ramirez, Andrea del Rosario, Eva Darren, Janine Berdin
28	"Motorsiklo" "Motorcycle"	Jojo A. Saguin	Rose Colindres	May 19, 2012
Xerces, a very obedient son who brought nothing but achievements to their family. As Xerces continued to excel in his life, his younger brother Ponso (Joseph Marco) had become his total opposite. From childhood until they grew up, Xerces was always being praised while Ponso was always being belittled not just by the people around them but somehow, by Xerces as well. Until a day came when it was Ponso's time to give his Kuya a lesson of life that cannot be learned from books. Cast: Rayver Cruz, Joseph Marco, Elizabeth Oropesa, Bembol Roco, Kristel Moreno, Isay Alvarez, Eliza Pineda, Jacob Dionisio, Philip Nolasco
29	"Lubid" "Rope"	Nuel C. Naval	Benson Logronio	May 26, 2012
The episode showcases the breathtaking sceneries of the province and its colorful ingenious traditions, including the grand competition of cowboys nationwide called "Rodeo Masbateño." In the story, Gemma aspired for nothing but to finish her studies and give her family a better life. But due to poverty, Gemma had a difficult time in achieving her dream because her father who did not want to send her to school. With the lack of support, she decided to compete in "Rodeo Masbateño" and become one of its cowgirls. Gemma did not mind the danger of being a cowgirl, because aside from her financial needs, being a cowgirl gave Gemma the happiness that she could not get from her father. Cast: Yen Santos, Juan Rodrigo, Snooky Serna, Akiko Solon
30	"Bangka" "Boat"	Rechie A. Del Carmen	Arah Jell Badayos	June 9, 2012
While some students in the city may be busy updating their Facebook accounts and asking their parents to buy them the latest gadgets, many kids in the country, especially those in the provinces, are sacrificing a lot just to be able to study. One of those less fortunate children is Rizza Abaño, an 11-year-old girl who is motivated to finish her studies even if she has to cross an open sea just to get to school. Amid the difficulties and even after her elder brother stopped going to school, Rizza remained determined to reach her dream and still believed that poverty is not a hindrance to success. Cast: Arjo Atayde, Abby Bautista, Makisig Morales, Ana Capri, Lito Pimentel, BJ Forbes, Crispin Pineda
31	"Bahay" "House"	Raz de la Torre	Joan Habana	June 16, 2012
Tikboy, a child who, together with his siblings, grew up with an abusive and irresponsible man in the special Father's Day episode. Tikboy and his siblings were so physically and emotionally battered by their dad, Toto that they no longer see him as a parent to long for but a monster to avoid. Little by little, because of their father's violence, Tikboy's house and their family were left broken. Cast: Matt Evans, Jaclyn Jose, William Lorenzo, Lauren Young, Jairus Aquino, Neil Coleta, Dianne Medina, Hiyasmin Neri, Khaycee Aboloc, Basty Alcances, Arlene Tolibas, Ganiel Krishnan, Veyda Inoval, Dexie Daulat
32	"Flyers"	Mae Czarina Cruz	Mark Duane Angos	June 23, 2012
The inspiring love story of a 78-year-old woman named Lola Auring Matias, who braved the streets of Manila alone each day in search for her missing husband, Lolo Luis. For two weeks, she went around the city with two "missing person" posters of Luis pinned on her dress. Every day, Lola Auring was full of hope that she and her husband will meet again. Luckily, a good Samaritan was touched with the old lady's dedication that her picture was posted in one of the social networking sites. Thousands were inspired with Lola Auring's true love for Lolo Luis that a campaign was made to help her. With the help of people who learned about her story and saw how she loves her husband so much, Lola Auring was reunited with her beloved husband. Cast: Anita Linda, Precious Lara Quigaman, James Blanco, Tony Mabesa, Mymy Davao, Gilleth Sandico, Zeppi Borromeo, Carla Guevarra, Alfred Labatos, Kitkat, Encar Benedicto, Ruben Gonzaga, Mike Lloren, Tanya Gomez
33	"Manika" "Doll"	Nuel C. Naval	Benson Logronio	June 30, 2012
A 15-year-old girl named Nene who was recurrently raped by her stepfather. But her world drastically changed when her mother even assisted her live-in partner in the act of rape. Since then, Nene cursed the ‘beauty’ that she possesses. Cast: Jane Oineza, Angel Aquino, Carlos Morales, Vangie Labalan, Gerald Madrid, Archie Alemania, RS Francisco, Liz Alindogan, Minco Fabregas, Kyline Alcantara, Elaine Quemuel, Jaco Benin, Jessette Prospero, Ana Abad Santos Note: This episode was slated to air June 2, 2012, but was pulled off after MTRCB granted it rated X regarding the sensitive rape theme. The episode finally aired June 30, 2012, after given rated SPG for final televised airing.
34	"Jacket"	Nuel C. Naval	Arah Jell Badayos	July 7, 2012
Jevon is a loving son who seeks justice for his family that was massacred, leaving his father and brother dead while his mother badly injured and siblings in shock. Will revenge serve its purpose of giving justice to Jevon's family? Or is forgiveness the key to the start of their family's healing from the tragedy? Cast: Gerald Anderson, Irma Adlawan, Yogo Singh, Carl John Barrameda, Toby Alejar, Andrei Garcia, Julio Pisk, Dindo Arroyo, Allyzon Lualhati, Gigi Locsin, Oliver Aquino, Kit Thompson
35	"Korona" "Crown"	Nuel C. Naval	Arah Jell Badayos	July 21, 2012
Discover the trials that Venus Raj had to go through before she joined Miss Universe through her empowering personal tale. How did she deal with the public's criticism on her physical appearance? What made her decide to fight for her crown after she was disqualified? How did she handle her newfound fame after her 'major-major' achievement? Cast: Venus Raj, Malou de Guzman, Perla Bautista, Gio Alvarez, Simon Ibarra, Amy Nobleza, Mariel Pamintuan, Bekimon, Arnold Reyes, Kelly Misa, Linn Oeymo, Raye Baquirin, Dax Bayani, Jiriane Montilla, Onse Tolentino
36	"Kurtina" "Curtain"	Rechie A. Del Carmen	Arah Jell Badayos	July 28, 2012
Acmad, a man who fell in love with a beautiful but elusive lady named Flor. Despite Flor's rejection and harsh treatment, Acmad did not give up and remained driven to win Flor's heart. Until one day, Flor shocked Acmad when she agreed on living together with him in exchange of P700. Cast: JM De Guzman, Marlann Flores, Rey PJ Abellana, Glenda Garcia, Cai Cortez, Jojit Lorenzo, Franzen Fajardo, Deborah Sun, Ces Aldaba, Shey Bustamante, Jovic Susim, Kyra Custodio, Nikka Javier, Claire Bercero
37	"Aso" "Dog"	Nick Olanka	Mark Duane Angos	August 4, 2012
A story of a 70-year-old man named Lolo Jessie (Nanding Josef) and his pet dogs Simba and Brownie, who taught him the meaning of a true family. Although grateful for his nephew who let him stay with his family, Lolo Jessie had no choice but to leave because his nephew's wife was not in favor of having dogs in their house. Lolo Jessie loved Simba and Brownie so much that he cannot abandon them and even promised to take care of them for the remaining years of his life. Cast: Nanding Josef, Jessa Zaragosa, Dingdong Avanzado, Liza Lorena, Jao Mapa, Keanna Reeves, Maliksi Morlaes, Neri Naig, Kazel Kinouchi
38	"Gong"	Raz de la Torre	Joan Habana	August 11, 2012
An episode that celebrates World Indigenous Day. Carina, a native of the Bagobo tribe who fell in love with a good-looking Ilonggo named Ariel. Aside from Ariel's family who is against their love affair, the cultural differences between Carina and the man she loves will complicate issues in their relationship. Cast: Angeline Quinto, Jason Abalos, Eva Darren, Maria Isabel Lopez, Tanya Gomez, Bing Davao, Izzy Canillo, Tom Olivar, Alex Dungo, Roy Requejo, Girlie Alcantara, Alex Castro, Arie Reyes
39	"Tinapay" "Bread"	Rechie A. Del Carmen	Benson Logronio	August 18, 2012
Flor, a devoted wife, mother, and daughter-in-law who did everything to keep her family complete. Deeply in love with her husband Tony, Flor remained kindhearted and caring to her mother-in-law, Lagring even after she found out that the grandmother of her sons did not really like her. But the day came when Flor found the courage to fight back when Lagring tried to physically hit her. Unfortunately after the incident, Tony took the side of his mom and ousted Flor from their house and kept the kids away from their mother. After more than a year, Flor decided that it was time for her to go back. But instead of being happily reunited with her children, Flor learned that her husband found himself a new ‘wife’ and mother to their children—Tony's other woman, Sylvia. Despite everything, Flor did not give up and went to see her kids almost every day that she eventually became friends with Sylvia. Cast: Mylene Dizon, Aubrey Miles, Daria Ramirez, Jake Roxas, Deydey Amansec, Veronica Louise Bernardo, Steven Fermo, Alexa Ilacad
40	"Cards"	Dado Lumibao	Joan Habana	August 25, 2012
A heartwarming tale of a little girl's unconditional love for her family and friends. In the story, Apple was most of the time scolded by her mom Jossie for always giving more time with Church activities rather than her studies. Despite the strictness of her mother, Apple remained a very thoughtful kid to her family and a caring friend to her fellow kids. Cast: Assunta De Rossi, Dominic Ochoa, Brenna Garcia, Nikki Bagaporro, John Manalo, Mikylla Ramirez, Elijah Magundayao, Shane Hermogenes, Phoebi Arbotante, Elisse Joson, Noel Colet.
41	"Stuffed Toy"	Darnel Joy R. Villaflor	Joan Habana	September 7, 2012
A celebration of Grandparents' Month by sharing a heartwarming story of three loving grandmothers. Despite their different personalities and priorities in life, Lola Joy, Lola Jane and Mamita Rose were able to find unity and showed love to each other when their grandson Travelito was born. What were the sacrifices they had to make to ensure their grandson's welfare? What will happen to Lola Joy, Lola Jane, and Mamita Rose when Travelito is suddenly taken away from them? Cast: Coney Reyes, Boots Anson-Roa, Pinky Marquez, Karel Marquez, Biboy Ramirez, Ryan Ramos, Justin Gonzales
42	"Komiks" "Comics"	Mae Czarina Cruz	Maan Dimaculangan-Fampulme	September 15, 2012
Rosalyn, a doctor who suffered from major depression due to a series of unfortunate incidents in her life, particularly because of her philandering father, Gilbert. At first, she was diagnosed to have paranoia and major depression; but later on Rosalyn was brought to a psychiatrist who declared that she was ill with bipolar disorder. Cast: Iza Calzado, Bembol Roco, Louella De Cordova, Cheska Iñigo, Pia Wurtzbach, Kalila Aguilos, Edward Mendez, Phytos Ramirez, Lowell Conales, Ismael Clavero, Kyline Alcantara, Sofia Millares, Omar Principe
43	"Bangkang Papel" "Paper Boat"	Nick Olanka	Benson Logronio	September 22, 2012
Ritche dreamt of being a seaman to prove to everyone, especially to his father, that even though he is gay, he can still succeed in life. But because of the fear of being insulted and belittled by his classmates, Ritche decided not to show his true identity. Cast: Edgar Allan Guzman, Lito Pimentel, Jobelle Salvador, Eda Nolan, David Chua, Joseph Bitangcol, Ryan Boyce, Bryan Homecillo, Quintin Alianza, Alchris Galura, Art Mendoza, Karen Dematera
44	"Singsing" "Ring"	Dado C. Lumibao	Ruel Montañez	September 29, 2012
An inspiring tale of trial, faith and miracles in the lives of TESDA Secretary Joel Villanueva, his wife Gladys, and their first child Jaden. Joel and Gladys had a good married life until they found out that Joel could not have a child because of his rare medical condition. Joel was in denial of the fact that it was him who has a problem. But as he saw Gladys' desire to have a child, Joel began to realize that he needed to see a doctor. Both of them were enthusiastic about their situation until Joel had his second operation aboard wherein their doctor told them explicitly that Joel could not produce a child. But just when a lot of doctors said that they will never have a baby, a "Divine gift" came along. Cast: Diether Ocampo, Maricar Reyes, Tom Rodriguez, Jim Paredes, Marco Gumabao, Liza Soberano, Angelina Kanapi, Racquel Villavicencio, Minco Fabregas, Carme Sanchez
45	"Relo" "Watch"	Dado C. Lumibao	Arah Jell Badayos, Maan Dimaculangan-Fampulme	October 6, 2012
A touching heavy family drama, where a dedicated father and husband suffers from liver cancer. Just when they thought that they have surpassed the biggest challenge in their life, couple Sherwin and Mayda will be struck by the news that Sherwin has liver cancer. Cast: Zanjoe Marudo, Dimples Romana, Aaron Junatas, Yogo Singh, Isay Alvarez, Clarence Delgado, Roy Alvarez, Levi Ignacio
46	"Apoy" "Fire"	Dado C. Lumibao	Benjamin Benson Logronio	October 13, 2012
Yoli, a role model to her younger sister Merlie, who started and obeyed every single thing that her ate asked of her, including the idea of having a relationship with Ramon. Believing that Yoli's intention for her was good and pure, Merlie followed Yoli, only to find out that she was just manipulated by her older sister. Cast: Erich Gonzales, Diana Zubiri, Patrick Garcia, Wowie De Guzman, Miles Ocampo, Juan Rodrigo, Raquel Monteza, Mark Joshua Sarayot, Dexie Daulat
47	"Upuan" "Chair"	Mae Czarina Cruz	Joan Habana	October 20, 2012
Letty, a selfless and dedicated teacher of Aetas living in remote areas. With Letty's full commitment to her students, a time came when her relationship with her family was sacrificed. As a result, her family suggested that she should stop teaching. Cast: Gladys Reyes, James Blanco, Tommy Abuel, Kiray Celis, Carlo Lacana, Menggie Cobarrubias, Jerome Ventinlla, Khaycee Aboloc, Buddy Palad, Thou Reyes, Joe Vargas, DM Sevilla
48	"Kandila" "Candle"	Dado C. Lumibao	Mark Duane Angos	October 27, 2012
Anna is woman whose third eye is open. Her happy married life started to suffer when she confessed her extraordinary ability to her husband Sonny. Granting her husband's request, Anna tried her best to live a normal life and ignore her third eye. But everything changed when Anna's husband and youngest son started to see the spirits and feel the souls around them. Cast: Manilyn Reynes, Gio Alvarez, Barbie Sabino, Neil Coleta, Auriette Divina, Jong Cuenco, Liz Alindogan, Koreen Medina, Ingrid Dela Paz, Gerald Pesigan, Jelo Echaluce
49	"Kabibe" "Clam"	Raz de la Torre	Joan Habana	November 3, 2012
Childhood sweethearts Eliza and Lito, who after 45 years, when both of their respective spouses already died, were reunited to fulfill their promises of love to each other. Amid the strong resistance of their children, how will Eliza and Lito realize their ultimate dream to walk down the aisle as each other's first and last love? Note: This episode is based on Iisa Pa Lamang in 2008. Cast: Gina Pareño, Dante Rivero, Rodjun Cruz, Sunshine Garcia, Belle Mariano, Nathaniel Britt, Justin Cuyugan, Mike Lloren, Encar Benedicto, Gilleth Sandico, Bryan Termulo, Janica Pareño, Paolo Serrano
50	"Flash Cards"	Dado C. Lumibao	Joan Habana	November 10, 2012
Fidel was able to recover from a stroke but it caused his loss of comprehension and speech. With no money for Fidel's therapy, his wife asked their young daughter, Jonah, to be a teacher to her father. Instead of playing with her friends, Jonah was stuck with Fidel. Cast: Ariel Rivera, Ana Roces, Casey Da Silva, Spanky Manikan
51	"Cellphone"	Dado C. Lumibao	Benjamin Benson Logronio	November 17, 2012
Lyn, the girlfriend of John, is a conservative lady. She based her life decisions on different kinds of sayings that she learned from her mother, aunt and grandmother. Lyn connects everything that happens to her to the old beliefs, from the right time to be in a relationship up to the reasons why she is suffering. Cast: Sylvia Sanchez, Yen Santos, Kean Cipriano, Ricardo Cepeda, Sharlene San Pedro, Nikki Bagaporo, Cris Villonco, Timothy Chan, Aria Clemente
52	"Flower Shop"	Nuel C. Naval	Joan Habana	November 24, 2012
Bebeng is dedicated wife and mother to her 13 kids who would always draw strength from her flower shop business in times of trials. Bebeng and her husband together with their thirteen children enjoyed a happy family life until several tragedies came their way--their eldest son was diagnosed with cancer, their third daughter got pregnant early, their sixth son was epileptic, and their 12th daughter died of pneumonia. Because of these misfortunes, Bebeng eventually lost her flower shop and almost lost her will to continue living. Cast: Dina Bonnevie, BJ Forbes, William Lorenzo, Ogie Diaz, Angeli Gonzales, Miguelito de Guzman, Lemuel Pelayo, John Medina, Ogie Escanilla, Cajo Gomez, Onse Tolentino
53	"Pulang Laso" "Red Ribbon"	Nuel C. Naval	Benjamin Benson Logronio	December 1, 2012
Kevin and Alan are both bisexuals who met through a casual sex encounter. Soon they found themselves falling in love with one another and eventually entered in a relationship. Their affair was filled with happiness until they knew that Kevin was infected with HIV (human immunodeficiency virus) and his case was already in AIDS (acquired immune deficiency syndrome) condition. Later on, Kevin confessed to Alan that he acquired the virus while engaging in casual hook ups with his clients. Cast: Carlo Aquino, Joem Bascon, Chanda Romero, Bodjie Pascua, Toby Alejar, Roeder Camañag, Leo Rialp, Laiza Comia, Kyra Custodio, Miguel Morales
54	"Police Uniform"	Dado C. Lumibao	Arah Jell Badayos, Mark Duane Angos	December 8, 2012
Roanna is a beautiful lady whose greatest ambition is to become a nun. But after her brother's death, Roanna left her dream of becoming a nun and pursued a different path, which is to become a cop. Amid her efforts to fulfill her goal, a man from her past, Jason (Joseph Marco), returned in her life to profess his love for her. Love grew between them, until Roanna became a full-fledged policewoman. Jason barely understood Roanna's job which resulted to conflicts between them. Cast: Empress Schuck, Joseph Marco, Rommel Padilla, Sharmaine Suarez, Alexa Ilacad, Akiko Solon, Jacob Dionisio, Gemmae Custodio, Alison Andres, Marnie Lapus, Erin Ocampo, Yussef Esteves
55	"Papag" "Bamboo bed"	Raz de la Torre	Arah Jell Badayos, Mark Duane Angos	December 15, 2012
Ben is a young man who bravely faced all the odds, even the maltreatment of his family, just to achieve his goal of finishing his studies. In a life full of darkness, how can one find the light that will drive him to fulfill his dreams? Cast: Tessie Tomas, Martin del Rosario, Bugoy Cariño, Nanding Josef, Aleck Bovick, Linn Oeymo, Hannah Flores, Shane Hermogenes, Queenie Sulit
56	"Belen" "Christmas house"	Nuel Crisostomo Naval	Benjamin Benson Logronio, Arah Jell Badayos	December 22, 2012
Husband and wife Persie and Cristy loved each other so much that Persie accepted his wife's past which involved having a son with her first husband. They almost had a perfect family life with their three sons until a disagreement led them to decide to go on with their lives separately. Cast: Joey Marquez, Aiko Melendez, Aaron Junatas, John Manalo, Deydey Amansec, Archie Alemania, Ama Quiambao, Joe Gruta, Pocholo Montes, Idda Yaneza
57	"Marriage Contract"	Nuel Crisostomo Naval	Jaymar Castro, Arah Jell Badayos	December 29, 2012
A touching story of undying love of Enez and Marvin who conquered almost everything to keep their marriage intact and love for each other alive. Instead of having their dream church wedding, Enez and Marvin just had a civil wedding because Enez became pregnant at a time when they were still financially unstable. The two started building dreams as a family but in the process, Enez's strength and character were put to test when Marvin suffered paralysis on different parts of his body and later on got comatose. Despite the misfortunes, Enez never left her husband. Cast: Shaina Magdayao, Bryan Santos, Yayo Aguila, Arlene Muhlach, Emilio Garcia, Jojit Lorenzo, Blythe Gorostiza, Shy Carlos, Simon Ibarra, Paco Evangelista, Karen Dematera
