= Alexa Ilacad =

Filipino actress (born 2000)

- Born: Alexandra Madarang Ilacad; February 26, 2000 (age 26); Pasig, Metro Manila, Philippines
- Education: Treston International College
- Occupations: Actress; singer; host; dancer; vlogger; model
- Years active: 2002–present
- Agents: Star Magic (2008–present); TV5 Network (2021–present); Advanced Media Broadcasting System (2024–present)
- Musical career
- Genres: OPM; Pop rock
- Years active: 2012; 2016–present
- Labels: Star Music (2012, 2016–2020, 2023–present); Off The Record (2020–2023)

YouTube information
- Channel: Alexa Ilacad
- Years active: 2016–present
- Genres: Music; Vlogging
- Subscribers: 712,000
- Views: 24,600,000
- Website: https://alexailacad.carrd.co

Alexandra Madarang Ilacad (born February 26, 2000) is a Filipino actress, singer, dancer, vlogger, model and television host who has appeared in several programs of ABS-CBN and TV5.

Since Gen 11 (2024), Ilacad has co-hosted the reality competition show Pinoy Big Brother, where she was given the moniker of "Ang Gen Z Bestie ni Kuya" (transl. The Gen Z Bestie of Big Brother).

She was also a contestant on the fourth season of the impersonation competition show Your Face Sounds Familiar (2025–2026), where she finished as the runner-up while also holding the highest points accumulated in a season.

== Career ==
=== 2008–2012: Career beginnings, Goin' Bulilit, and TOP ===
At the age of two, she performed in various TV commercials for brands such as Vaseline, Johnson's Baby, Smart, Cheez Whiz, McDonald's, and Jollibee. She become more prominent when she joined the children's comedy show Goin' Bulilit in 2008.

Aside from that, she also played minor roles for various series such as May Bukas Pa, Nasaan Ka, Elisa?, A Beautiful Affair, and several episodes of Maalaala Mo Kaya. She has also played roles in films such as For The First Time, The Reunion, and Amorosa: The Revenge. During her stay in Goin' Bulilit, she was first paired with fellow actor Nash Aguas for the episode Goin' Bulilit Presents: In My Dreams.

In 2012, she was included in the group Tweens Of Pop together with fellow Bulilit stars Angel Sy, Mika dela Cruz, and Noemi Oineza. The group released a self-titled extended play under Star Music, its lead single Crush becoming the OST for the sitcom Luv U starring Miles Ocampo, Marco Gumabao, Angeli Gonzales, CJ Navato, Kiray Celis, and Igi Boy Flores.

=== 2013–2016: Luv U, The NLex Loveteam and her debut in the music scene ===
In 2013, she exited Goin' Bulilit alongside fellow Bulilits Kobi Vidanes, Joseph Andre Garcia, Aaron Juntas, and Angel Sy.

Her first lead role was when she played as Lexie Domingo in the second season of the youth-oriented comedy TV sitcom Luv U, the official starting point of her loveteam partnership with Gimme 5 member Nash Aguas, famously known as "NLex". From there, they have been paired again multiple times, their other projects include various MMK and Wansapanataym episodes.

She also played the young Maria Mercedes in the eponymous series. In 2014, she and Aguas were paired again to do Camille and Drew in the television series Bagito which was based on the Wattpad series of the same name by Noreen Capili.

After Luv U concluded in 2016, Ilacad created a YouTube channel and started uploading Beauty, Lifestyle, and Travel vlogs as well as Song Music Covers. In the same year, she and Aguas landed a role on the fourth season of the hit series Doble Kara as Patricia Hernandez and Paolo Acosta.

She also played the role Jewel, Angel Locsin's sister in the award-winning film Everything About Her with Vilma Santos. In addition, she joined the reality music competition We Love OPM: The Celebrity Sing-Offs as part of Team Yeng: Oh My Girls. She, together with GirlTrends member Krissha Viaje, and 88rising artist Ylona Garcia were coached and trained by their mentor Pop Rock Royalty Yeng Constantino. The girls finished the competition as runners-up just behind the winner, Team Erik's Tres Kantos. Soon after finishing We Love OPM, she was launched as Star Music’s newest Teen Pop Rock Artist. She released her debut album To The Moon & Back with the spunky carrier single Pakipot, Suplado with music video directed by Kean Cipriano, featuring Nash Aguas. Her album had six songs: Not Too Young, Kung Pwede Lang, Pakipot, Suplado, Kahit Saan, Kahit Kailan, Dream Boat, Puso, and an acoustic version of Kahit Saan, Kahit Kailan, also featuring Aguas. The songs from this album were originals were written by her best friend, Eunice Jorge, the vocalist of rock band Gracenote.

Her debut album became a hit after consistently charting in MOR 101.9's Biga10 for several weeks.

=== 2017–2020: Loveteam breakup and her solo career ===
In 2017, she received her Silver Play Creator Award from YouTube for surpassing over 100k subscribers in ASAP Chillout. Currently, her channel has more than 670,000 subscribers.

In the same year, Ilacad and Aguas were paired again in the crime drama television series The Good Son as Justine and Calvin. The series lasted until April 13, 2018, and the ending also marked the conclusion of Ilacad and Aguas' loveteam. The pair, with support from the management decided to split-up as a means for them to focus on each other's solo careers.

Apart from The Good Son, Ilacad also appeared in Star Cinema's action-comedy film Extra Service starring Arci Muñoz, Coleen Garcia, and Jessy Mendiola, and romantic-comedy film Finally Found Someone starring Sarah Geronimo and John Lloyd Cruz. Aside from these, she also played roles in Maalaala Mo Kaya as young Karla Estrada in the episode Autograph with Angelica Panganiban and Karla Estrada and as Joy in the episode Kulungan with Lorna Tolentino.

Ilacad also took part in ABS-CBN's 2017 Summer Station ID, Ikaw Ang Sunshine Ko along with BoybandPH, Maymay Entrata, Kisses Delavin, Yong Muhajil, and Edward Barber, Noven Belleza, Sam Mangubat and Froilan Canlas, and Sue Ramirez, Kristel Fulgar, Sharlene San Pedro, Kira Balinger, and Ylona Garcia.

In 2019, Ilacad played the role of Luna Dela Cuesta, in the drama series The Killer Bride as well as Rose in the iWantTFC original series Call Me Tita.

In October of the same year, she scored her first lead film role through the horror film Santigwar under Horseshoe Studios and Reality Entertainment. She played the role of Hasmin.

She also played the role of Bobbie Salazar (originally played by Bea Alonzo) in the 2020 film Four Sisters Before the Wedding, the prequel of the 2013 hit Four Sisters and a Wedding.

After four years, in 2020, she came back to the music scene with new single Love at First Sight under a new music label, OFF THE RECORD (under Exclusive License to MCA Music Inc.).

=== 2021–present: New projects, PBB, and KDLex ===
In 2021, she was cast as Hannah Salcedo in the Kapamilya Channel drama series Init Sa Magdamag, where she was paired with Gab Lagman. She also released a Frank Pole remix and Acoustic version of her 2020 single Love at First Sight and another single entitled Stay Right Here which she promoted on It's Showtime's segment Hide and Sing as TagoKanta #1, where AC Bonifacio successfully guessed her as the episode's celebrity singer.

She also starred in another Maalaala Mo Kaya episode Libro with Kira Balinger and Yves Flores.

In the same year, she joined Pinoy Big Brother: Kumunity Season 10, the tenth overall season of Pinoy Big Brother, as part of the first batch of housemates in the Celebrity Edition, having been evicted on Day 71 alongside fellow housemate KD Estrada. Her time inside the Bahay ni Kuya resulted in a discussion on body dysmorphia, after an altercation between her and fellow housemate and Init Sa Magdamag co-star Albie Casiño, a conflict that occurred with fellow housemates livestreamer Eian Rances and comedian Brenda Mage, and her eventual closeness with KD Estrada that grew as they consoled each other from their individual episodes inside the house.

In 2022, after being evicted, she and Estrada began to appear on a number of shows and interviews together such as IWant ASAP, Kumunity: G sa Gabi with Robi Domingo, KAPAMILYA Journeys of Hope with Father Tito Caluag, PBB Kumu Big Arrival where they performed with musical icon Rico Blanco and ASAP Natin 'To as singers/performers. Ilacad was also chosen as the host of the online gameshow Quiz Mo Ko on the Kumu platform for the month of February—and eventually extended until March.

ABS-CBN launched a project for the victims of typhoon Odette—100 days of various fundraising activities starting from the 10-day By Request benefit concert. KDLex, Estrada and Ilacad's love team partnership were part of the first lineup of artists to perform. During their session, they reached over 100,000 live viewers.

Shortly after the announcement, Ilacad and Estrada held the online fan concert event through KTX.ph entitled Closer: The KDLex Fan Con on February 26, in time with her 22nd birthday. SVIP and VIP tickets for their concert reportedly became sold-out in just an hour, and several times more instantly after being restocked due to popular demand.

Ilacad also released her first single of the year, Paano (How) which peaked No. 1 on iTunes Philippines. Paano was her first self-written song to be officially released to the public. Prior to the KDLex concert, the pair delivered their first single Misteryo (Mystery) under Star Music, as well as the Pinoy Big Brother: Kumunity Season 10 – Adult Edition eviction song, When I See You Again which the pair wrote and composed together during their time in the Big Brother House. In less than 12 hours, the two singles placed #1 and #2 respectively on the iTunes Philippines Top 100.

Ahead of the 2022 Philippine presidential election, Ilacad along with Estrada, Angela Ken, Antenorcruz, FANA, iDolls, Janine Berdin, JM Yosures, JMKO, Jona, Anji Salvacion, Lara Maigue, Reiven Umali, and the TNT Boys took part in the release of the reimagined version of Pag-Isipan Mo Ang Boto Mo (Think Over Your Vote) which was originally composed and recorded by Jamie Rivera.

In April 2022, Ilacad was the first cover girl in the inaugural edition of Star Magic's digital video magazine SLAY, which marked the agency's 30th anniversary.

In May the same year, Ilacad and Estrada starred in the miniseries Run To Me directed by Dwein Baltazar. Along with the series, the pair also dropped their soundtrack album which reached no.1 on the local iTunes chart. Their official soundtrack album ranked atop the local album list, while five of its tracks placed in the top 10 songs chart, Hiwaga (Magic) at 1st spot, followed by Palagi (Alwaya) at 2nd, Kasi, Kung, Kahit (Because, If, Despite) at 3rd, Misteryo at 4th, and When I See You Again at 5th. The single versions of When I See You Again, and Misteryo also placed 6th and 8th respectively. In total, seven out of the top 10 songs on iTunes Philippines at the time were from the pair.

In August, Star Magic toured in the United States as part of their 30th anniversary celebration, with Ilacad among its performers. The artists first performed in the Newport Performing Arts Theater, Resorts World Manila, followed by the US shows in Kings Theater, Brooklyn, The Warfield, San Francisco, and in the Saban Theatre, Beverly Hills.

Through their fan's support, Ilacad and Estrada landed a billboard in South Korea as the pair won the Best International Artist at IdolPick's 82nd Electronic Signboard Event, and again the following month at its 83rd Electronic Signboard Event.

In November, the Philippine Educational Theater Association (PETA) included Ilacad and Estrada as its members and selected them as lead actors in PETA's return to producing original Filipino musicals through musical play Walang Aray (No Pain), a take on Severino Reyes' 1898 classic zarzuela Walang Sugat (No Wound). The play opened on February 17 and ran until May 14, 2023.

In 2024, Ilacad was announced as a host for Pinoy Big Brother: Gen 11, where she was given the moniker of "Ang Gen Z Bestie ni Kuya" (transl. The Gen Z Bestie of Big Brother). She would later reprise the said role for the two Celebrity Collab seasons.

In 2025, Ilacad was revealed to be a contender for the fourth season of Your Face Sounds Familiar. Despite finishing the season with the highest amount of points (271), she finished the season as the first runner-up with a final score of 93.5%, trailing behind the duo of JM Dela Cerna and Marielle Montellano, also known as JMielle by a slim margin of 0.5% points.

In May 2026, Ilacad confirms that she and Estrada decided to part ways as a loveteam and the decision was mutual.

== Personal life ==
In 2021, Ilacad attended Treston International College in Taguig, and finished her marketing degree as a dean's lister.

== Filmography ==
=== Television ===
Year	Title	Role	Ref.
2008	Gagambino	Young Leah	
2008–2013	Goin' Bulilit	Herself	
2009	May Bukas Pa	Michelle	
2009	Komiks Presents: Nasaan Ka Maruja?	Young Maruja/Cristy	
2010	Maalaala Mo Kaya: Plane Ticket	Young Mercy	
2011	Goin' Bulilit Presents: In My Dreams	Maan	
2011	Maalaala Mo Kaya: Tulay	Karina	
2011	Maalaala Mo Kaya: Tumba-Tumba	Selenia	
2011	Nasaan Ka, Elisa?	Ella Altamira	
2011	Wansapanataym: Housemates ni Lola	Lily	
2012	Maalaala Mo Kaya: Ensaymada	Daughter	
2012	Maalaala Mo Kaya: Tinapay	Teen Meanne	
2012	A Beautiful Affair	Young Genevieve "Gen" Saavedra	
2012	Maalaala Mo Kaya: Police Uniform	Young Roana	
2013–2016	Luv U	Alexis "Lexie" Domingo	
2013	Maalaala Mo Kaya: Krus	Young Diana	
2013	Maalaala Mo Kaya: Tirintas	Jane	
2013	Toda Max	Jhing Jhing	
2013	Honesto	Young Marie	
2013	Maria Mercedes	Young Maria Mercedes Muñoz	
2014	Wansapanataym: Enchanted House	Alice Agustin	
2014	Wansapanataym: Perfecto	Kylie	
2014–2015	Bagito	Camille "Cam/Princess" Lorenzo	
2014–present	ASAP/ASAP XP	Host (2025-present) / Performer	
2016	We Love OPM	Contestant / Member of "Team Yeng – Oh My Girls"	
2016–2017	Doble Kara	Patricia Hernandez	
2017	Maalaala Mo Kaya: Autograph	Teen Karla Estrada	
2017	Maalaala Mo Kaya: Kulungan	Joy	
2017	Home Sweetie Home	Sharon	
2017–2018	The Good Son	Justine Asuncion	
2018	Ipaglaban Mo!: Panganay	Cindy	
2018	Maalaala Mo Kaya: Hapag Kainan	Bea	
2018	Maalaala Mo Kaya: Red Lipstick	Marjorie	
2019	Maalaala Mo Kaya: Family Portrait	Katerina "Katya" Angara	
2019	Maalaala Mo Kaya: Passport	Mindy	
2019	The Killer Bride	Luna Dela Cuesta	
2019	Call Me Tita	Rose	
2019	Ipaglaban Mo!: Iskolar	Abby	
2020	Ipaglaban Mo!: Yes Sir	Wendy Cervantes	
2021	Init sa Magdamag	Hannah Salcedo	
2021	Maalaala Mo Kaya: Libro	Valerie	
2021	Pinoy Big Brother: Kumunity Season 10	Celebrity Housemate	
2022	Don't Cry Janna	Janna Gives	
2022	Run to Me	Jewel "Juju" Riccio	
2023–2024	Pira-Pirasong Paraiso	Angela Medina / Elizabeth Marie "Beth" Barrameda-Paraiso	
2023–present	Eat Bulaga!	Guest / Performer	
2023–present	It's Showtime	Guest / Performer	
2024; 2026	TV Patrol	Guest Star Patroller	
2024	Pinoy Big Brother: Gen 11	Host	
2025	Pinoy Big Brother: Celebrity Collab Edition	Host	
2025	Rainbow Rumble	Contestant	
2025	Pinoy Big Brother: Celebrity Collab Edition 2.0	Host	
2025–2026	Your Face Sounds Familiar season 4	Contestant/1st runner up	
2026	Miss Behave	Marla Briones	
2026	Someone, Someday	Camille Cordova	

=== Film ===
Year	Title	Role	Notes
2008	For the First Time	Nicole	
2012	The Reunion	Marie Suarez	
2012	Amorosa: The Revenge	Young Amanda	
2016	Everything About Her	Jewel	
2017	Extra Service	Julia	
2017	Finally Found Someone	Junilyn Esguerra	
2018	Open	Mika	
2019	Santigwar	Hasmin	
2020	Four Sisters Before the Wedding	Roberta Olivia "Bobbie" Salazar	
2023	Toss Coin	Pia	Philippines' official entry for the 20th Hong Kong Asian Film Festival 2023
2024	Mujigae	Sunshine "Sunny" De Jesus	
TBA	Reset U/I	Adie Catapang	
2025	Co-Love	Peach	Puregold CinePanalo Film Festival 2025 entry

=== Microdrama ===
Year	Title	Role	Ref.
2026	The Chambermaid's Daughter	Hannah Montano / Babo	
2026	BGYO: Vertical on Demand	Kai	

=== Shows hosted ===
Year	Title	Role
2015	MYX	MYX Celebrity VJ
2017	One Music POPSSSS	Host
2022	Quiz Mo Ko	Host, Quizmaster
2024	Pinoy Big Brother	Host, Gen-Z Bestie ni Kuya

=== Musical Plays ===
Year	Title	Role (Performance)	Role (Production)	Ref.
2021	Takot ang Pinoy	Sirena	Lyricist, composer	
2023	Walang Aray	Julia	—N/a	

=== Music Videos ===
Year	Title	Performed by	Directed by	Label	Notes
2010	Munting Hiling	Alexa Ilacad, Mika dela Cruz (originally by Hannah Flores)	Edgar Mortiz, Badjie Mortiz, Frasco Mortiz	Star Songs	Special Music Video by Goin' Bulilit
2014	Simpleng Tulad Mo	Daniel Padilla	—N/a	Star Music	Special Music Video by Polytechnic University of the Philippines
2014	Batang Bata Ka Pa	Chiro	—N/a	Star Music	Special Music Video, Bagito OST
2015	Chuva Choo Choo	Jolina Magdangal	Edgar Mortiz, Badjie Mortiz, Frasco Mortiz	Star Music	Special Music Video by Luv U
2016	Gusto Ko	Gracenote ft. Alexa Ilacad	—N/a	Warner Music Philippines, Soupstar Entertainment	—N/a
2016	Pakipot, Suplado	Alexa Ilacad	Kean Cipriano	Star Music	—N/a
2017	Ikaw Ang Sunshine Ko, Isang Pamilya Tayo	Alexa Ilacad, BoyBand PH, Maymay Entrata, Kisses Delavin, Yong Muhajil, and Edward Barber, Noven Belleza, Sam Mangubat, Froilan Canlas, Sue Ramirez, Kristel Fulgar, Sharlene San Pedro, Kira Balinger, and Ylona Garcia.	—N/a	ABS-CBN, Star Music	ABS-CBN Summer Station ID 2017
2017	Kung Pwede Lang	Alexa Ilacad	Chad V. Vidanes	Star Music	—N/a
2017	Kahit Saan, Kahit Kailan	Alexa Ilacad	James A. Muleta	Star Music	—N/a
2017	I'll Be There For You	Jake Zyrus	—N/a	Star Music	Special Music Video, The Good Son OST
2020	Love at First Sight	Alexa Ilacad	Alexa Ilacad	Off The Record	—N/a
2020	Maligaya Ang Buhay Ko	Iñigo Pascual	—N/a	Star Music	Special Christmas Video, Four Sisters Before the Wedding OST
2021	Ibang Planeta	Zild	—N/a	Star Music	Special Music Video, Init Sa Magdamag OST
2022	Paano	Alexa Ilacad	James Ocampo	Off The Record	—N/a
2022	Pag-Isipan Mo Ang Boto Mo	ABS-CBN Music All Star (Alexa Ilacad, KD Estrada, Angela Ken, Antenorcruz, FANA, iDolls, Janine Berdin, JM Yosures, JMKO, Jona, Anji Salvacion, Lara Maigue, Reiven Umali, TNT Boys)	—N/a	ABS-CBN, Star Music	2022 Presidential Elections Anthem
2022	Misteryo	Alexa Ilacad, KD Estrada	Jefferson Hao	Star Music	—N/a
2022	TagumPIE	Alexa Ilacad, KD Estrada, BINI, John Roa, Reneé Dominique	—N/a	PIE	—N/a
2022	Pabalik Sa'yo	Darren Espanto	Darren Espanto, Jonathan Tal Placido	Republic Records Philippines, UMUSIC Philippines	—N/a
2022	Tayo Ang Ligaya ng Isa't Isa	Alexa Ilacad, KD Estrada, Jane de Leon, Janella Salvador, Joshua Garcia, Donny Pangilinan, Belle Mariano, Daniel Padilla, Kathryn Bernardo, Ogie Alcasid, Anne Curtis, Kim Chiu, Martin Nievera, Zsa Zsa Padilla, Sarah Geronimo, Gary Valenciano, Regine Velasquez-Alcasid, Jolina Magdangal, Melai Cantiveros, AC Bonifacio, Andrea Brillantes, Seth Fedelin, Francine Diaz, Darren Espanto, Kyle Echarri, Jed Madela, Klarisse de Guzman, Morissette, Angeline Quinto, Erik Santos, KZ Tandingan, Elha Nympha, Khimo Gumatay, Anji Salvacion, Bailey May, Piolo Pascual, Chito Miranda, Moira Dela Torre, Sharon Cuneta and the DYCI Dagalak Choir	Paolo Ramos	ABS-CBN, Star Music	ABS-CBN Christmas Station ID 2022
2023	Days	KD Estrada	Carl Tejada	Star Music	
2023	Pangako Yan	Alexa Ilacad, KD Estrada, with the PETA ensemble (Yeyin dela Cruz, Ayla Garcia, Ada Tayao, Tom Bienvenida, Donn Boco, Csai Habla)	Ian Segarra	Philippine Educational Theater Association (PETA)	Walang Aray Cast Recording

== Discography ==
=== Singles ===
Year	Title	Label	Performed by	Notes	Ref.
2023	Stay Right Here (Summer Remix)	Off The Record	Alexa Ilacad		
2022	Misteryo (Dancehall Remix)	StarPop	Alexa Ilacad, KD Estrada, Theo Martel	—N/a	
2022	Misteryo	StarPop	Alexa Ilacad, KD Estrada	—N/a	
2022	When I See You Again	StarPop	Alexa Ilacad, KD Estrada	Pinoy Big Brother: Kumunity Season 10 – Adult Edition Eviction Song	
2022	Paano	Off The Record	Alexa Ilacad	—N/a	
2021	Stay Right Here	Off The Record	Alexa Ilacad	—N/a	
2021	Love at First Sight (Acoustic)	Off The Record	Alexa Ilacad	—N/a	
2021	Love at First Sight (Frank Pole Remix)	Off The Record	Alexa Ilacad, Frank Pole	—N/a	
2020	Love at First Sight	Off The Record	Alexa Ilacad	—N/a	
2016	Pakipot, Suplado	Star Music	Alexa Ilacad	—N/a	

=== Albums ===
==== Extended plays ====
Year	Album	Song title	Performed by	Label	Ref.
2016	To The Moon & Back	Not Too Young	Alexa Ilacad	Star Music	
2016	To The Moon & Back	Kung Pwede Lang	Alexa Ilacad	Star Music	
2016	To The Moon & Back	Pakipot Suplado	Alexa Ilacad	Star Music	
2016	To The Moon & Back	Kahit Saan Kahit Kailan	Alexa Ilacad	Star Music	
2016	To The Moon & Back	Dream Boat	Alexa Ilacad	Star Music	
2016	To The Moon & Back	Puso	Alexa Ilacad	Star Music	
2016	To The Moon & Back	Kahit Saan Kahit Kailan – Acoustic Version	Alexa Ilacad, Nash Aguas	Star Music	
2012	Tweens Of Pop	Crush	Tweens Of Pop (Alexa Ilacad, Angel Sy, Mika dela Cruz, Noemi Oineza)	Star Music	
2012	Tweens Of Pop	Bestfriend 4ever	Tweens Of Pop (Alexa Ilacad, Angel Sy, Mika dela Cruz, Noemi Oineza)	Star Music	
2012	Tweens Of Pop	Sumayaw Tayo	Tweens Of Pop (Alexa Ilacad, Angel Sy, Mika dela Cruz, Noemi Oineza)	Star Music	
2012	Tweens Of Pop	Yugyugan	Tweens Of Pop (Alexa Ilacad, Angel Sy, Mika dela Cruz, Noemi Oineza)	Star Music	
2012	Tweens Of Pop	Crush / Bestfriend 4ever / Sumayaw Tayo / Yugyugan – Medley	Tweens Of Pop (Alexa Ilacad, Angel Sy, Mika dela Cruz, Noemi Oineza)	Star Music	

==== Soundtrack/Compilation Albums ====
Year	Album	Song title	Performed by	Label	Ref.
2022	StarPop – The Remixes	Misteryo – Dancehall Remix	Alexa Ilacad, KD Estrada, Theo Martel	StarPop	
2022	Run To Me (Original Soundtrack)	Misteryo	Alexa Ilacad, KD Estrada	StarPop	
2022	Run To Me (Original Soundtrack)	When I See You Again	Alexa Ilacad, KD Estrada	StarPop	
2022	Run To Me (Original Soundtrack)	Kasi, Kung, Kahit	Alexa Ilacad	StarPop	
2022	Run To Me (Original Soundtrack)	Hiwaga	Alexa Ilacad, KD Estrada	StarPop	
2022	Run To Me (Original Soundtrack)	Palagi	Alexa Ilacad, KD Estrada	StarPop	

=== Appears on ===
==== As a featured artist ====
Year	Title	Album	Performed by	Label	Note
2022	Pag-Isipan Mo Ang Boto Mo	—N/a	ABS-CBN Music All Star (Alexa Ilacad, KD Estrada, Angela Ken, Antenorcruz, FANA, iDolls, Janine Berdin, JM Yosures, JMKO, Jona, Anji Salvacion, Lara Maigue, Reiven Umali, TNT Boys)	ABS-CBN, Star Music	2022 Presidential Elections Anthem
2019	Gusto Ko	&	Gracenote, Alexa Ilacad	Warner Music Philippines, Soupstar Entertainment	—N/a
2016	Gusto Ko	Transparent	Gracenote, Alexa Ilacad	Warner Music Philippines, Soupstar Entertainment	—N/a

==== Station ID ====
Year	Title	Performed by	Label
2017	Ikaw Ang Sunshine Ko, Isang Pamilya Tayo	Alexa Ilacad, BoyBand PH, Maymay Entrata, Kisses Delavin, Yong Muhajil, Edward Barber, Noven Belleza, Sam Mangubat, Froilan Canlas, Sue Ramirez, Kristel Fulgar, Sharlene San Pedro, Kira Balinger, and Ylona Garcia.	ABS-CBN, Star Music
2022	TagumPIE	Alexa Ilacad, KD Estrada, BINI, John Roa, Reneé Dominique.	PIE
2022	Tayo Ang Ligaya ng Isa't Isa	Alexa Ilacad, KD Estrada, Jane de Leon, Janella Salvador, Joshua Garcia, Donny Pangilinan, Belle Mariano, Daniel Padilla, Kathryn Bernardo, Ogie Alcasid, Anne Curtis, Kim Chiu, Martin Nievera, Zsa Zsa Padilla, Sarah Geronimo, Gary Valenciano, Regine Velasquez-Alcasid, Jolina Magdangal, Melai Cantiveros, AC Bonifacio, Andrea Brillantes, Seth Fedelin, Francine Diaz, Darren Espanto, Kyle Echarri, Jed Madela, Klarisse de Guzman, Morissette, Angeline Quinto, Erik Santos, KZ Tandingan, Elha Nympha, Khimo Gumatay, Anji Salvacion, Bailey May, Piolo Pascual, Chito Miranda, Moira Dela Torre, Sharon Cuneta and the DYCI Dagalak Choir	ABS-CBN, Star Music

==== OST ====
Year	Title	Show	Performed by	Label	Ref.
2022	Kasi, Kung, Kahit	Run To Me	Alexa Ilacad	StarPop	
2022	Palagi	Run To Me	Alexa Ilacad, KD Estrada	StarPop	
2022	Hiwaga	Run To Me	Alexa Ilacad, KD Estrada	StarPop	
2022	When I See You Again	Run To Me	Alexa Ilacad, KD Estrada	StarPop	
2022	Misteryo	Run To Me	Alexa Ilacad, KD Estrada	StarPop	
2022	When I See You Again	Pinoy Big Brother: Kumunity Season 10 – Adult Edition	Alexa Ilacad, KD Estrada	StarPop	
2012	Crush	Luv U	Tweens of Pop (Alexa Ilacad, Angel Sy, Mika dela Cruz, Noemi Oineza)	Star Music	

=== Composition credits ===
Year	Title	Performed by	Written and composed by	Produced by	With credit (on Spotify)	With credit (on YouTube)	Label	Ref.
2022	Misteryo (Dancehall Remix)	Alexa Ilacad, KD Estrada, Theo Martel	Alexa Ilacad, Eunice Jorge of Gracenote		Yes	Yes	StarPop	
2022	Kasi, Kung, Kahit	Alexa Ilacad	Alexa Ilacad, KD Estrada	Jonathan Manalo	Yes	Yes	StarPop	
2022	Hiwaga	Alexa Ilacad, KD Estrada	Alexa Ilacad, KD Estrada	Jonathan Manalo	Yes	Yes	StarPop	
2022	Palagi	Alexa Ilacad, KD Estrada	Alexa Ilacad, KD Estrada	Jonathan Manalo	Yes	Yes	StarPop	
2022	Misteryo	Alexa Ilacad, KD Estrada	Alexa Ilacad, Eunice Jorge of Gracenote	Eunice Jorge of Gracenote, Velvet Playground	Yes	Yes	StarPop	
2022	When I See You Again	Alexa Ilacad, KD Estrada	Alexa Ilacad, KD Estrada	Jonathan Manalo	Yes	Yes	StarPop	
2022	Paano	Alexa Ilacad	Alexa Ilacad, Eunice Jorge of Gracenote	Ricky Ilacad, Eunice Jorge of Gracenote	Yes	Yes	Off the Record	

== Awards and nominations ==
=== Movies, television, and Theater awards ===
Year	Award ceremony	Category	Nominated work	Result	Ref.
2013	PMPC Star Awards for Television	Best Youth-Oriented Program	Luv U	Won	
2014	PMPC Star Awards for Television	Best Youth-Oriented Program	Luv U	Won	
2015	PMPC Star Awards for Television	Best Comedy Program	Luv U	Nominated	
2015	PEPlist Awards	Most Promising Pair (shared with Nash Aguas)	—N/a	Won	
2018	Catholic Mass Media Award	Best Drama Series	The Good Son	Won	
2018	Guild of Educators, Mentors, and Students (GEMS) Hiyas ng Sining Awards	Best TV Series	The Good Son	Won	
2018	49th Box Office Entertainment Awards	Best Ensemble Performance of the Year	The Good Son	Won	
2020	69th FAMAS Annual Awards	Best Picture	Four Sisters Before the Wedding	Nominated	
2022	37th Star Awards for Movies	Movie of the Year	Four Sisters Before the Wedding	Nominated	
2022	37th Star Awards for Movies	Movie Ensemble Acting of the Year (shared with the cast of Four Sisters Before the Wedding)	Four Sisters Before the Wedding	Nominated	
2022	37th Star Awards for Movies	Movie Love Team of the Year (shared with Joao Constancia)	Four Sisters Before the Wedding	Nominated	
2022	6th Asia Pacific Luminare Awards	Asia's Most Promising Love Team of the Year (shared with KD Estrada)	—N/a	Won	
2022	Star Magical Christmas	METRO Best Couple (shared with KD Estrada)	—N/a	Won	
2022	Star Magical Christmas	METRO Best in Costume Female	—N/a	Won	
2022	RAWR Awards 2022	Breakthrough Artist of the Year (shared with KD Estrada)	—N/a	Won	
2022	RAWR Awards 2022	Digital Series of the Year	Run To Me	Won	
2022	RAWR Awards 2022	Love Team of the Year (shared with KD Estrada)	—N/a	Won	
2022	RAWR Awards 2022	Fan Club of the Year (shared with KD Estrada)	—N/a	Won	
2023	2022 Tag Awards Chicago	Best Love Team (Bronze) (shared with KD Estrada)	—N/a	Won	
2023	35th Star Awards for Television	Best Drama Supporting Actress	Init Sa Magdamag	Nominated	
2023	4th VP Choice Awards	Fandom of the Year (shared with KD Estrada)	—N/a	Nominated	
2023	4th VP Choice Awards	Love Team of the Year (shared with KD Estrada)	—N/a	Nominated	
2023	4th VP Choice Awards	Promising Female Star	—N/a	Nominated	
2023	8th Push Awards 2022	Push Popular Love Team of the Year (shared with KD Estrada)	—N/a	Won	
2023	ABS-CBN Ball 2023	Most Beautiful Body Award	—N/a	Won	
2023	Gawad Buhay	Female Lead Performance in a Musical	Walang Aray	Pending	
2023	Gawad Buhay	Outstanding Ensemble Performance for a Musical	Walang Aray	Pending	
2023	Gawad Buhay	Outstanding Musical – Original or Translation/Adaptation	Walang Aray	Pending	
2023	2023 Tag Awards Chicago	Best Supporting Actress	Pira-Pirasong Paraiso	Pending	

=== Music awards ===
Year	Award ceremony	Category	Nominated work	Result	Ref.
2016	11th Annual MYX Music Awards	MYX Music Award for MYX Celebrity VJ of the Year	—N/a	Nominated	
2017	Awit Awards	Best Pop Recording	Pakipot, Suplado	Nominated	
2017	Awit Awards	Best Performance by a New Female Recording Artist	Pakipot, Suplado	Nominated	
2017	Awit Awards	People's Choice – Favorite New Female Recording Artist	—N/a	Won	
2021	Awit Awards	Best Dance Recording	Love at First Sight	Nominated	
2023	Awit Awards	Best Remix Recording	Misteryo (Dancehall Remix)	Pending	

=== Creator awards ===
Year	Award ceremony	Award	Notes	Awards issued by
2017	YouTube Creator Awards	Silver Creator Award	100,000 subscribers	YouTube
