= Angelito (TV series) =

2011–12 Philippine television drama series

- Genre: Teen drama
- Written by: Mary Rose Colindres; Kay Brondial; Jurey Mirafuentes; Mel Abaygar; Marga Labrador
- Directed by: Theodore Boborol; Neal F. Del Rosario
- Starring: JM De Guzman; Kaye Abad; Tom Rodriguez; John Prats; Charee Pineda; Devon Seron; Sam Concepcion
- Opening theme: "Ika'y Mahal Pa Rin" by Jovit Baldivino
- Country of origin: Philippines
- Original language: Filipino
- No. of episodes: 108 (Batang Ama); 110 (Bagong Yugto)

Production
- Executive producers: Minnella T. Abad; Adjanet F. Rase
- Cinematography: Tey Clamor; Jaime "Nong" Lleno, Jr.
- Editors: Roman Rodriguez III; Joseph Garcia; Megan Abarquez; Alexces Shiela Tiglao
- Running time: 30-45 minutes
- Production company: RSB Drama Unit

Original release
- Network: ABS-CBN
- Release: November 14, 2011 – December 14, 2012

Related
- Katorse (2009); Bagito (2014)

Angelito is a Philippine television drama series broadcast by ABS-CBN. Directed by Theodore C. Boborol and Neal F. Del Rosario, it stars JM de Guzman, Charee Pineda, Kaye Abad, Tom Rodriguez, John Prats, Devon Seron and Sam Concepcion. It aired on the network's Kapamilya Gold line up and worldwide via TFC from November 14, 2011 to December 14, 2012 replacing My Fair Lady and was replaced by MMK Klasiks.

It had two shows, the first being Batang Ama and the second being Bagong Yugto. The series starred JM de Guzman and Charee Pineda, the former playing the titular character.

== Conception ==
Due to the rise of teenage pregnancy in the Philippines, ABS-CBN made drama shows based on lives of young parents to warn and lecture the public of the dangers of such incidents. An example is the Erich Gonzales-billed Katorse. While these shows such as the aforementioned soap opera presented the subject matter from the perspective of a young mother, it was then found out that lives and struggles of young fathers were often less-known. This prompted ABS-CBN to produce a show tackling the same subject matter, this time from the perspective of the father, and ideas for Angelito were born.

JM de Guzman and Charee Pineda, who were starring in the 2011 remake of Mula sa Puso, were chosen for the roles of the main characters, Angelito and Rosalie, respectively. Also, three of their fellow cast members from the same show, Devon Seron, Sue Ramirez, and Beauty Gonzalez, joined the cast, with Gonzales appearing later. Felix Roco and Goin' Bulilit alumnus Carl John Barrameda were cast as Angelito's friends.

To prepare for the roles, De Guzman and Pineda attended a workshop exercise known as "immersion" which helped them research about teenage pregnancy and parenthood.

Veteran actors like Al Tantay, Snooky Serna, and Elizabeth Oropesa also joined the cast. Oropesa, who had experiences being a teen parent herself mentored De Guzman and Pineda about their roles as young parents and narrated how she raised her own child like a best friend.

== Shows ==
=== Batang Ama (2011) ===
Student-couple Angelito Santos and Rosalie Dimaano live a normal countryside life but a sudden turn of events would change their lives when Rosalie is suddenly pregnant. Dismayed by the unexpected pregnancy, both the Santoses and the Dimaanos forbid any communication between the two. As Angelito takes his child with him and runs away to the Philippine capital Manila, he strives to become a good father to his child, Jun-jun. But raising a child as a teen proves to be such a hard task, especially since Angelito is doing it on his own. Knowing the pains and ordeals of having a dysfunctional family, Angelito vows to do everything to raise Jun-jun well and find a way to reunite with Rosalie. Five years later, the ex-lovers' paths meet; Jun-jun enters childhood and Rosalie is bound to marry her rich fiancé. Will Angelito's dream of having a complete family ever come true?

=== Bagong Yugto (2012) ===
Angelito and Rosalie are now happily married, living a normal life with their son Junjun. Meanwhile, Jenny starts a new life in Singapore only to discover that she is pregnant with Angelito's child during their relationship. Pledging not to reappear in Angelito's life again, she turns to her childhood friend Raffy for comfort, but circumstances prompt her to return to the Philippines and cross paths with the Santos family once more.

== Production crew ==
- Director: Theodore C. Boborol, Neal F. Del Rosario
- Executive in Charge of Production: Laurenti M. Dyogi
- Executive in Charge of Creative: Ruel S. Bayani
- Creative Manager: Mavic H. Oducayen
- Production Manager: Willy Laconsay
- Executive Producer: Minnela T. Abad, Adjanet F. Rase, Katrina Juban
- Headwriter: Mary Rose Colindres
- Writers: Kay Brondial, Jurey Mirafuentes, Carmela Abaygar, Marga Labrador
