= My BFF =

2014 Philippine television drama series

- Title card
- Genre: Comedy drama
- Created by: Agnes Gagelonia-Uligan
- Written by: Maribel G. Ilag; Gilbeys Z. Sardea; Rhoda Sulit-Marino
- Directed by: Roderick A.P. Lindayag
- Creative director: Jun Lana
- Starring: Jillian Ward; Mona Louise Rey
- Theme music composer: Janno Gibbs
- Opening theme: "Best Friends Forever" by Jillian Ward, Mona Louise Rey and Janno Gibbs
- Country of origin: Philippines
- Original language: Tagalog
- No. of episodes: 69 (list of episodes)

Production
- Executive producer: Mary Joy Lumboy-Pili
- Production locations: Quezon City, Philippines
- Editors: Benedict Lavastida; Ed Esmedia
- Camera setup: Multiple-camera setup
- Running time: 17–30 minutes
- Production company: GMA Entertainment TV

Original release
- Network: GMA Network
- Release: June 30 – October 3, 2014

My BFF is a 2014 Philippine television drama comedy series broadcast by GMA Network. Directed by Roderick Lindayag, it stars Jillian Ward and Mona Louise Rey both in the title role. It premiered on June 30, 2014, on the network's Telebabad line up. The series concluded on October 3, 2014, with a total of 69 episodes.

The series is streaming online on YouTube.

== Cast and characters ==
Cast

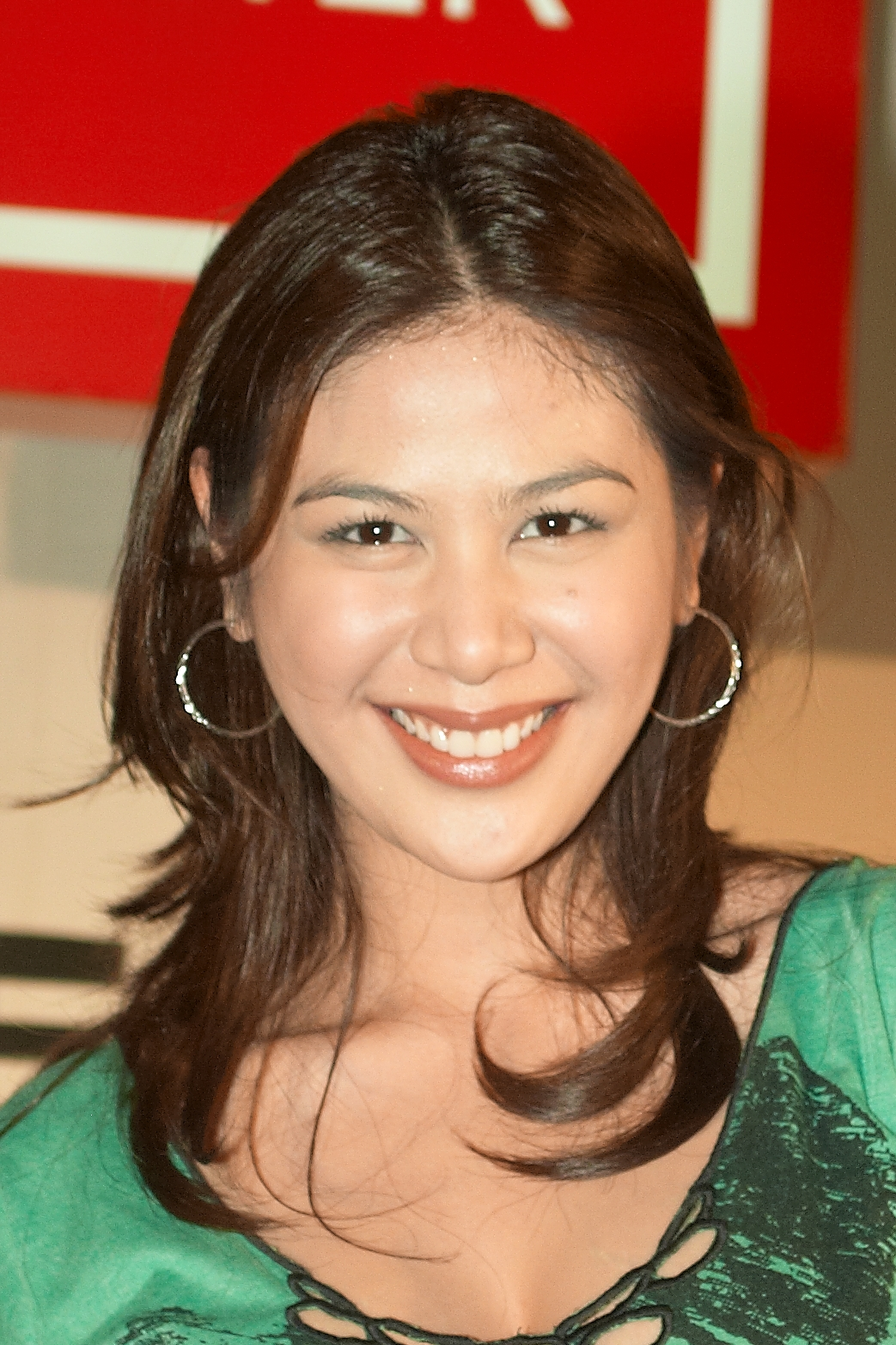
Valerie Concepcion

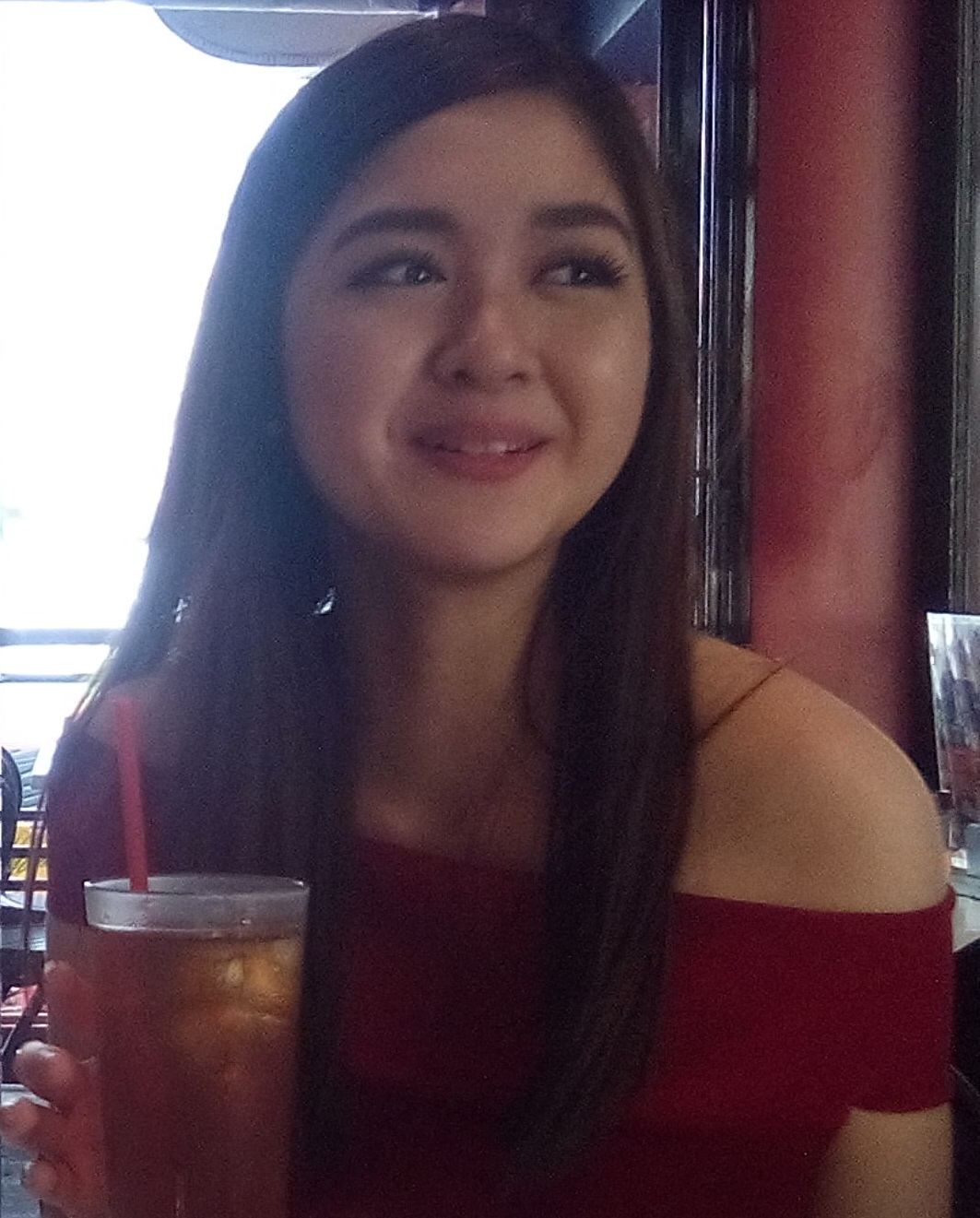
Mariel Pamintuan

Lead cast

- Jillian Ward as Chelsea Garcia / Elsie
- Mona Louise Rey as Rachel Garcia

Supporting cast

- Manilyn Reynes as Lynette "Lyn" Garcia
- Janno Gibbs as Christian Garcia
- Valerie Concepcion as Lavender "Lav" Catacutan
- Pen Medina as Gerry
- Irma Adlawan as Tonette
- Rez Cortez as Jessie
- Jaypee de Guzman as Tolits
- Leandro Baldemor as Patrick
- Via Antonio as Mindy
- Hiro Peralta as Baron
- Mariel Pamintuan as Kimberly
- Isabel Frial as Jasmine
- Miggs Cuaderno as Red
- Angel Satsumi as Giselle
- Jennylyn Chubb as Tiana

Guest cast

- Mike "Pekto" Nacua as the older man
- Will Ashley de Leon as Jasper
- Bobby Andrews as Jasper's dad
- Betong Sumaya as Niccolo
- Maey Bautista as Espiritista
- Gladys Reyes as Mercedes

== Ratings ==
According to AGB Nielsen Philippines' Mega Manila household television ratings, the pilot episode of My BFF earned a 15.9% rating. The final episode scored a 16.2% rating. The series had its highest rating on September 19, 2014, with a 17.9% rating.

== Accolades ==
Accolades received by My BFF
Year	Award	Category	Recipient	Result	Ref.
2014	28th PMPC Star Awards for Television	Best Child Performer	Jillian Ward	Nominated	
2014	28th PMPC Star Awards for Television	Best Child Performer	Mona Louise Rey	Nominated	
