= List of My BFF episodes =

My BFF is a 2014 Philippine television drama comedy series broadcast by GMA Network. It premiered on the network's Telebabad line up from June 30 to October 3, 2014, replacing My Love from the Star.

Mega Manila ratings are provided by AGB Nielsen Philippines.

== Series overview ==
Month	Episodes	Monthly Averages
Month	Episodes	Mega Manila
June 2014	1	15.9%
July 2014	22	12.9%
August 2014	21	13.1%
September 2014	22	15.1%
October 2014	3	15.9%
Total	69	14.6%

== Episodes ==
=== June 2014 ===
No.	Title	Original air date	Social Media Hashtag	AGB Nielsen Ratings (Mega Manila)	Timeslot Rank	Ref.
1	Meet Christian's Happy Family	June 30, 2014	#MyBFF	15.9%	#1	
Despite difficult circumstances that Christian's family is facing, they are always grateful to have each other's backs.

=== July 2014 ===
No.	Title	Original air date	Social Media Hashtag	AGB Nielsen Ratings (Mega Manila)	Timeslot Rank	Ref.
2	Birth of Baby Rachel	July 1, 2014	#WelcomeBabyRachel	14.9%	#1	
Christian's family will grow even bigger as Lyn gives birth to Rachel, their youngest child that will bring joy and spark in to their lives.
3	Goodbye, Chelsea	July 2, 2014	#ChelseaInDanger	13.3%	#2	
Christian and Lyn felt so lonely because their daughter Chelsea didn't survive the accident. How will they overcome this tragedy?
4	Chelsea's Worst Nightmare	July 3, 2014	#ThePromiseOfChelsea	14.5%	#2	
Chelsea gets shock upon finding out that she is already dead and that she's now a spirit who can only be seen by her grandfather, Gerry.
5	Lyn's Trust Issues With Christian	July 4, 2014	#WeWillMissYouChelsea	13.7%	#2	
Lyn gets mad at Christian for suspecting that he and Lavender have an affair.
6	Chelsea's Ghost Talks to Lyn	July 7, 2014	#PleaseStayMommyLyn	13.9%	#2	
Chelsea's ghost tries to talk to her mother Lyn to apologize for her untimely death and to convince her mom to get back with Christian.
7	Invisible Chelsea	July 8, 2014	#WelcomeBackMyBFF	12.6%	#2	
Chelsea wants to have fun and play with her family like a normal child. Unfortunately, no one can see her as she is now a ghost.
8	Rachel Meets the Bullies	July 9, 2014	#ChelseaTheSavior	16.5%	#1	
It's Rachel's first day of class but it seems like her classmates don't like her. Will she be able to handle the bullies?
9	Lav, The Desperate Lover	July 10, 2014	#MyBFFMyProtector	12.4%	#2	
Lav will try to distract Christian's plans for his family to disappoint Lyn.
10	Chelsea Saves Rachel from the Bullies	July 11, 2014	#ChelseaMyBFFGhost	14.2%	#2	
Chelsea saves Rachel from the school bullies who are teasing her.
11	Rachel Gets Scared of Chelsea's Ghost	July 15, 2014 (Note: Episode 11 was preempted on July 14 due to President Aquino's live speech to the nation.)	#AlwaysHereForMyBFF	15.8%	#1	
Rachel gets scared of Chelsea upon finding out that her friend is a ghost.
12	Rachel Bonds With Lav's Children	July 16, 2014	#RachelMeetsRedAndBlue	6.9%	#1	
Lav asks Christian to bond with her family but things did not go well for Rachel as she gets bullied upon meeting Lav's children.
13	Lav and Lyn's Face-Off	July 17, 2014	#MommyLynVSLavender	9.3%	#1	
Lyn went to the guidance office to defend her daughter from her bully schoolmates. It is little to her discovery that one of the bullies' mother, Lav, turns out to be the rumored girlfriend of her husband.
14	The Sisters' Mission	July 18, 2014	#ImSorryMyBFF	10.2%	#1	
Rachel and Chelsea planned something to reconcile their parents. Will their plan succeed?
15	Christian and Lyn Reconcile	July 21, 2014	#DaddyMascot	12.8%	#1	
After showing complete remorse for all the damages that he did to his wife, Lyn finally reconciles with Christian for the sake of their family.
16	Christian and Lyn Go on a Romantic Date	July 22, 2014	#BFFTuesDate	12.5%	#2	
Christian and Lyn rekindle their love for each other by having a romantic date.
17	Lyn and Christian Spend the Night Together	July 23, 2014	#MyBFFTogetherAgain	15.2%	#1	
After Lyn and Christian enjoyed their date night, they decided to spend the night together.
18	Lav is Pregnant!	July 24, 2014	#DaddyLongInTrouble	12.3%	#2	
Lav feels so excited to spread the news about her pregnancy knowing that Christian is the father of the child she's conceiving.
19	Christian's Dark Secret	July 25, 2014	#SorryMommyLyn	11.3%	#2	
Christian felt uneasy because he knows Lyn will get mad at him if she finds out that he's the father of the child that Lav is conceiving.
20	Chelsea and Rachel Get Confused With the New Baby	July 28, 2014	#IkawPaRinMommyLyn	11.9%	#2	
Chelsea and Rachel got more confused about Christian's new baby when they asked random students about the situation.
21	Rachel Discovers Her Father's Secret	July 29, 2014	#HuliKaLav	11.7%	#2	
Rachel gets mad at her father Christian after knowing the truth about Lav's pregnancy. How will she cope up with the situation?
22	Rachel Forgives Her Father Wrongdoings	July 30, 2014	#SelosSiDaddyLong	13.5%	#2	
Rachel forgives her father Christian and apologizes for the hurtful words she said to him.
23	Rachel Gets Threatened With Her Half-Siblings	July 31, 2014	#FamilyFunThursday	14.5%	#1	
While Rachel is having a vacation with her family, she saw her half siblings and felt uncomfortable because they might do something bad again.

=== August 2014 ===
No.	Title	Original air date	Social Media Hashtag	AGB Nielsen Ratings (Mega Manila)	Timeslot Rank	Ref.
24	Rachel Gets Disappointed With Her Father	August 1, 2014	#LynVsLavPart2	13.8%	#1	
Rachel got disappointed to her father when she found out that he chose to spend time with Lav instead of bonding with her.
25	Lyn Scolds Rachel's Bullies	August 4, 2014	#OhMyTrouble	16.2%	#2	
Lyn will reprimand Lav's children after witnessing how these kids bully Rachel.
26	Lav Confronts Lyn	August 5, 2014	#WhenSelosStrikes	16.5%	#1	
Lav confronts Lyn when she the latter reprimanding her children.
27	Chelsea Scares Lav	August 6, 2014	#MyBestSister	12.8%	#2	
Chelsea scares off Lav when she saw her trying to take advantage of Christian while he's asleep.
28	Lav's Fake Pregnancy	August 7, 2014	#LavNotPreggy	12.8%	#1	
While everyone is worried because of the accident, Lav's fake pregnancy was revealed.
29	Rachel's Wish for Her Parents	August 8, 2014	#SecretFeelings	10.3%	#2	
After finding out that Lav's pregnancy was fake, is there any chance for Lyn, Christian, and Rachel to have their family back?
30	Lyn Explains Her New Relationship With Rachel	August 11, 2014	#TrueFeelings	10.7%	#2	
Despite their brewing friendship, Lyn readily informs Rachel that Patrick is just her friend.
31	A Child's Ghost Saves Rachel from the Bullies	August 12, 2014	#HelloJasper	12.6%	#2	
Lav's children are about to prank Rachel until a ghost suddenly steps in to protect her.
32	Chelsea's Newfound Friend	August 13, 2014	#NewFoundFriend	10.1%	#2	
Chelsea becomes friend with the ghost who saved Rachel from the bullies.
33	Revenge for the Bullies	August 14, 2014	#TheSecret	10.5%	#2	
Jasper tries to scare the bullies upon seeing them trying to do something bad with Rachel's things.
34	Chelsea's Hopeful Spirit	August 15, 2014	#StayPositiveMyBFF	10.7%	#2	
Chelsea strongly believes that there is still a way to resolve issues in her family.
35	Chelsea and Rachel's Bonding Time	August 18, 2014	#FieldTripWithMyBFF	12.5%	#2	
Chelsea and Rachel enjoy each other's company while playing together.
36	Rachel's Nightmare	August 19, 2014	#GoodDeeds	13.3%	#2	
Rachel wakes up from a nightmare where her father Christian decided to leave them for good.
37	Rachel Gets Comforted by Her Sister's Ghost	August 20, 2014	#DaddyLongInDanger	10.2%	#2	
Chelsea may already be a ghost but this won't be a hindrance to comfort her sister Rachel, who happens to be longing for their father's love.
38	Rachel Fight Back Against the Bullies	August 21, 2014	#TheFrameUp	11.6%	#2	
Rachel fights back against her bullies, Blue Jasmine and Red, when she heard them badmouthing about her mother, Lynette.
39	Jasper and Chelsea Investigate Christian's Case	August 22, 2014	#TheEvidence	13.3%	#2	
Jaspher helps Chelsea to find out if Christian is the one who hurt Patrick.
40	Jasper Cheers Up Chelsea	August 25, 2014	#TheLetter	13.3%	#2	
Chelsea reminisces her happy moments with her family when she was still alive but gets cheered up by her new friend Jasper.
41	Don't Trust the Bullies, Rachel	August 26, 2014	#DaddyLongIsFree	17.3%	#1	
Chelsea advises Rachel not to trust the bullies easily.
42	The Bullies Sabotage Rachel's Performance	August 27, 2014	#RachelInTrouble	12.7%	#2	
While Rachel is reciting her poem on stage, the bullies tried to make fun of her. Will she be able to compose herself despite the hassle?
43	Chelsea Tries to Comfort Rachel	August 28, 2014	#LynVsLavPart3	15.2%	#1	
Chelsea tries to comfort her sister Rachel after the video scandal in the school.
44	Punishment for the Bullies	August 29, 2014	#FightOrGiveUp	17.7%	#1	
Blue and her friends heard that mommy Lyn wants to punish the kids who bullied her daughter.

=== September 2014 ===
No.	Title	Original air date	Social Media Hashtag	AGB Nielsen Ratings (Mega Manila)	Timeslot Rank	Ref.
45	Rachel Sees Ghosts	September 1, 2014	#RachelsThirdEye	15.5%	#1	
Rachel finally reveals to Lyn that she can see ghosts and talks about her friendship with Chelsea.
46	Rachel Gets Kidnapped	September 2, 2014	#WhereIsRachel	13.4%	#1	
Jessie orders someone to kidnap Rachel in order to make revenge against Christian for hurting Lav.
47	Chelsea Rescues Rachel	September 3, 2014	#FindingRachel	16.2%	#1	
Upon finding out her sister was kidnapped, Chelsea will stop at nothing just to save Rachel from danger.
48	Chelsea Scares the Kidnappers	September 4, 2014	#SavingRachel	17.8%	#1	
Chelsea will try to scare the kidnappers so that Rachel can have the chance to escape from them.
49	Rachel Reunites With Her Parents	September 5, 2014	#TheGreatEscape	16.9%	#1	
Rachel finally reunites with her parents through Chelsea's help.
50	Chelsea's Wish	September 8, 2014	#LoloGerrysWish	17.6%	#1	
In fear of losing communication with her sister, Chelsea begs her grandfather Gerry to convince her parents to not close Rachel's third eye.
51	Rachel Ignores Chelsea	September 9, 2014	#RachelMeetsChelsea	16.4%	#1	
Even if it hurts her feelings, Rachel tries to ignore her late sister Chelsea because she promised her parents not to talk to her anymore.
52	Rachel Bonds With Her Family	September 10, 2014	#AngTagasundo	15.5%	#1	
Now that Christian and Lyn are back together, they decided to spend time with Rachel.
53	Chelsea's Time Has Come	September 11, 2014	#TheSacrifice	12.4%	#1	
Now that Chelsea's mission on Earth has ended, will she go back to heaven?
54	Chelsea is Losing Her Powers	September 12, 2014	#MyBFFReunited	11.8%	#2	
Chelsea is slowly losing her powers because her mission in earth is already finished.
55	Christian Reunites With Chelsea	September 15, 2014	#AFathersPromise	15.2%	#1	
While he's in coma, Christian gets reunited with Chelsea in the other world after getting shot by Lav.
56	Christian's Promise to Chelsea	September 16, 2014	#DontGoDaddyLong	13.7%	#1	
Christian promises that he will take good care of Lyn and Rachel once he returns to his body.
57	Chelsea's Last Mission	September 17, 2014	#MyBFF	13.7%	#2	
Chelsea is not yet cleared to go to heaven because she has to help Lav and her children to change.
58	Chelsea Discovers Lav's Dirty Secret	September 18, 2014	#MissionPossible	16.9%	#1	
While Chelsea continues on in her mission on Earth, she accidentally overhears Lav's confession that she is the one who put Christian's life at risk.
59	Chelsea Possesses Jasper's Body	September 19, 2014	#IMissYouRachel	17.9%	#1	
Chelsea accidentally possesses Jasper's body for a short period of time.
60	Rachel Meets Jasper	September 22, 2014	#MyBFF	15.3%	#1	
Rachel meets human Jasper but he can't remember her anymore.
61	Rachel Discovers the Truth About Chelsea	September 23, 2014	#LoloGerryInLove	13.5%	#2	
Rachel finally learns that Chelsea is her sister when Lyn showed her pictures of her late sister.
62	Lyn Summons Chelsea's Spirit	September 24, 2014	#MyBFFAteChelsea	14.5%	#1	
After getting convinced that her daughter has abilities to see spirits, Lyn asks Rachel if she could also speak to Chelsea after finding out the truth.
63	Chelsea Shows Kindness to Rachel's Bullies	September 25, 2014	#MyBFFMoveOn	16.0%	#1	
Chelsea helps Blue and Red despite all the bad things they've done to Rachel.
64	Lavender Gets Sick	September 26, 2014	#MissingMyBFF	13.5%	#2	
Chelsea finds a way on how she could help Blue and Red when she saw them getting worried about Lavender's condition.
65	Lyn and Chelsea's Emotional Reunion	September 29, 2014	#JasperMyNewFriend	14.6%	#1	
While Lyn is praying, she finally got to reunite with Chelsea and they become emotional as they share a tight embrace.
66	Chelsea Bids Farewell	September 30, 2014	#LetGoAndMoveOn	13.6%	#2	
Chelsea informs her mother Lyn that her mission on Earth is finally accomplished and has to go to The Other World.

=== October 2014 ===
No.	Title	Original air date	Social Media Hashtag	AGB Nielsen Ratings (Mega Manila)	Timeslot Rank	Ref.
67	Jasper Remembers Chelsea	October 1, 2014	#MyBFFHappyFamily	15.7%	#1	
Jasper goes to Chelsea's home and explained to her family how the latter became his friend during his days in the hospital.
68	Christian's Memory is Back	October 2, 2014	#LynForgivesLav	15.7%	#1	
After visiting Lav, Christian's memory starts to come back.
69	Lyn and Christian's Happy Ending	October 3, 2014	#MyBFFHappyEverAfter	16.2%	#1	
Lyn wants to forget the past and start over with Christian by helping him remember all the things they went through together.

Episodes notes
