= Santigwar =

- Directed by: Joven Tan
- Written by: Ays De Guzman
- Starring: Alexa Ilacad
- Cinematography: Jun Dalawis; Tejay Gonzales
- Edited by: Jason Cahapay
- Music by: Mike Bon
- Production company: Horseshoe Studios
- Distributed by: Reality Entertainment
- Release date: October 30, 2019
- Running time: 123 minutes
- Country: Philippines
- Language: Filipino

Santigwar is a 2019 Filipino horror, fantasy and supernatural film directed by Joven Tan and starring actress Alexa Ilacad in her first ever lead film.

Under Horseshoe Studios and Reality Entertainment, the film premiered nationwide on October 30, 2019.

== Plot ==
Hasmin (Alexa Ilacad) is a young girl who inherited the power and skill of a Santigwar from her father. The Santigwar is a kind of albularyo who not only heals and does magic, but also fights against mythical creatures. As a Santigwar herself, she has been on a decade-long hunt for a specific aswang clan as she and her father Mang Nano (Dan Fernandez) aim to track down the aswangs responsible for killing her late mother Siony (MJ Lastimosa).

While on the lookout, a group of fun-seeking boys—Aldrin (Marlo Mortel), Jay (Paulo Angeles), Benny (Keann Johnson), and Carlo (Marco Gallo) head to Aldrin's girlfriend Ara's (Pam Gonzales) province for a visit. As the band of teenagers arrive, they crossed paths with her, and triggered her senses. Chaos then happens in the small town, she then realizes that the aswang is closer to her now than ever. Fearing for their safety, she pushes them to leave.

Soon later, she uncovered the truth that linked her Santigwar family to the enemies.

== Cast ==
=== Main cast ===
- Alexa Ilacad as Hasmin
- Marlo Mortel as Aldrin
- Paulo Angeles as Jay
- Keann Johnson as Benny

=== Supporting cast ===
- Lui Manansala as Nana Rosa
- Marco Gallo as Carlo
- Michelle Vito as Lea
- Dan Fernandez as Mang Nano
- Aubrey Miles as Ynes
- Michelle Liggayu as Melai
- Pam Gonzales as Ara
- Emie Conjurado as Sabel
- MJ Lastimosa as Siony
