= Mariel Pamintuan =

Filipino actress

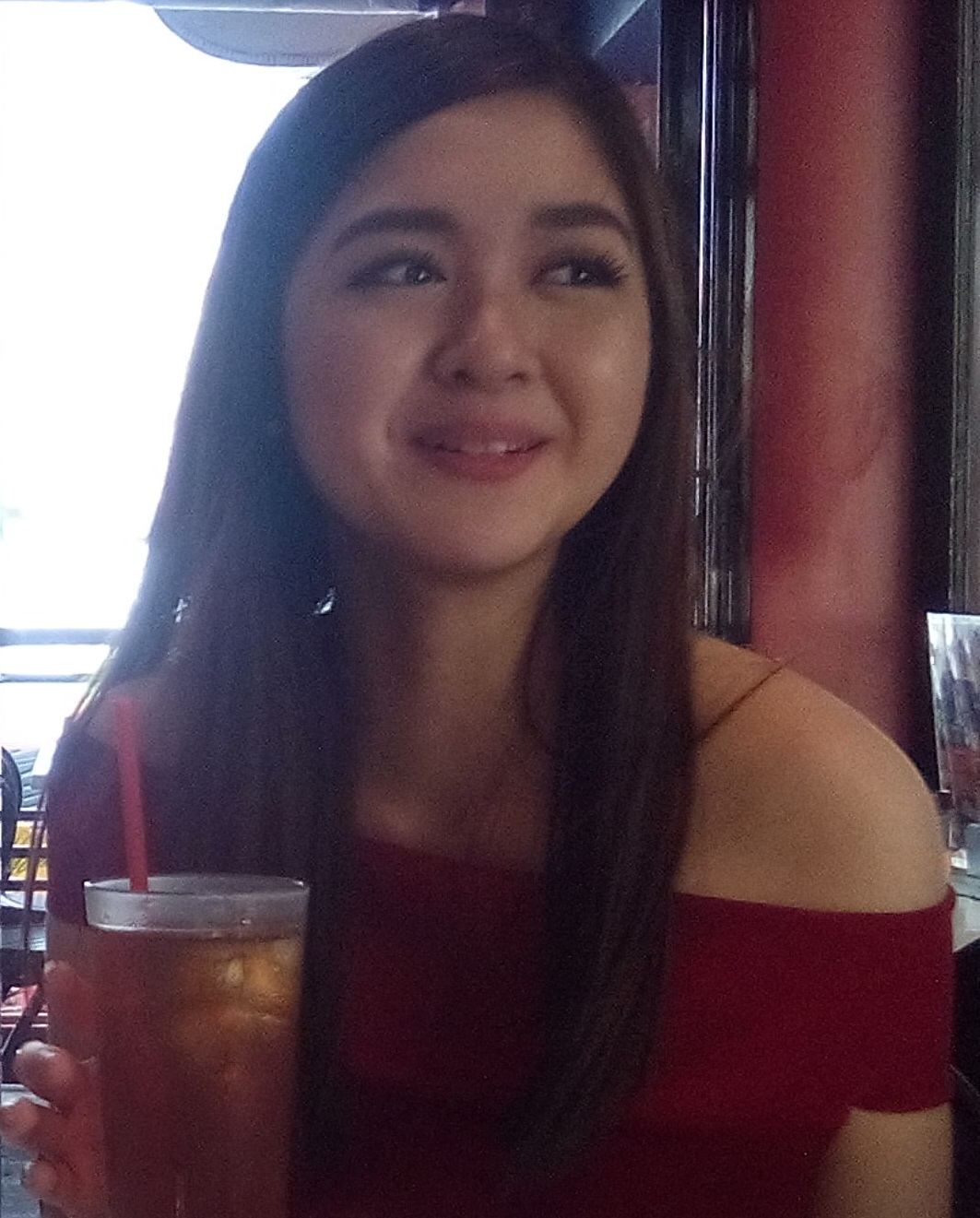
- Pamintuan in 2015
- Born: Mariel Viray Pamintuan; February 24, 1998 (age 28); Antipolo, Rizal, Philippines
- Education: De La Salle–College of Saint Benilde
- Occupations: Actress, singer, model
- Years active: 2007–2017; 2022–present
- Agents: Star Magic (2007–2013); Sparkle GMA Artist Center (2013–2017; 2022–2024)

Mariel Viray Pamintuan (born February 24, 1998) is a Filipino actress. She is a former talent of ABS-CBN's Star Magic and GMA Network's Sparkle.

== Career ==
Pamintuan started doing workshop at a very young age. She got her first acting stint on GMA Network's Kamandag as the young counterpart of Maxene Magalona's character Lily. She's also been in several commercials and print ads like Coca-Cola, Chuckie, Lemon Square Mamon, Jollibee, Pure 'n Fresh Cologne, Del Monte Fruit Cocktail, and AyosDito.ph. Being a former Star Magic Artist, Mariel was known for her character in Angelito: Batang Ama as Rachel Dimaano the younger sister of Charee Pineda's character Rosalie Dimaano. When she transferred to GMA Network in 2013, she was given the chance to play the role of Mila Aguirre, the younger sister of Heart Evangelista's character Eloisa Aguirre, in Magkano Ba ang Pag-ibig?. In 2014, she became one of the cast of My BFF alongside Ms. Manilyn Reynes and Mr. Janno Gibbs. She then welcomed 2015 with a drama series entitled Once Upon a Kiss, which she played the role of Athena Pelaez- Almario the older sister of Miguel Tanfelix's character Prince Pelaez- Almario, who at first hated Bianca Umali's character Ella Servando- Rodrigo. After Once Upon a Kiss she is set to do another drama series with Heart Evangelista in 2015 drama series Beautiful Strangers whom she worked with in her first Kapuso drama series. She had her first ever lead role in an episode of Maalaala Mo Kaya entitled Pinto (trans: door) with Ms. Sunshine Cruz that trended nationwide and worldwide.

== Filmography ==
=== Television ===
Year	Title	Role
2007	Kids TV	Herself / Host
2007	Kamandag	Young Lily
2008	Volta	Pepper / 110
2009	Komiks Presents: Flash Bomba	Young Marissa
2010	Wansapanataym: Valentina	Young Valentina
2010	Habang May Buhay	Young Jane
2010	Alyna	Teen Alyna Natividad
2010	Midnight DJ: Multo sa Ilalim ng Tulay	Leila
2011	Bianong Bulag	Young Isabel Robles
2011	Alakdana	Young Adana San Miguel
2011	Kim: Awit Kay Inay	Young Michelle
2011	Wansapanataym: Cacai Kikay	Bea
2011–2012	Angelito: Batang Ama	Rachel Dimaano
2012	Kung Ako'y Iiwan Mo	Teen Sarah Trinidad
2012	Angelito: Ang Bagong Yugto	Rachel Dimaano
2013–2014	Magkano Ba ang Pag-ibig?	Mila Aguirre
2014	Paraiso Ko'y Ikaw	Celine / Fake Josephine
2014	My BFF	Kimberly
2014	Imbestigador: Pampanga Double Murder Case	Vanessa
2015	Maynila: Second Princess	Jane
2015	Once Upon a Kiss	Athena Pelaez Almario
2015	Love Hotline: Ina Ng Mga Abandonada	Angeline Singson
2015	Imbestigador: Cavite Double Rape Case	Mimay
2015	Maalaala Mo Kaya: Mothers Quest	Hannah
2015	Imbestigador: Quezon City Rape Case	Honey
2015	Love Hotline: Ang Maikling Buhay Ni Ofelia	Ofelia
2015	Beautiful Strangers	Leslie De Jesus
2015	Maynila: Mahal Nga Kasi Kita	Cleng
2016	Wish Ko Lang: Maskara	Chella dela Cruz
2016	Maalaala Mo Kaya: Pinto	Sally
2016	Karelasyon: Hiya	Che
2017	Legally Blind	Dara
2022	Wish Ko Lang: Killer Menudo	Rose
2023	Luv Is: Love at First Read	Sandy Bascon
2023	Black Rider	Angelica "Angie" Reyes
2024	Pinoy Crime Stories	Lisa
2024	Widows' War	Juliet Gamboa

=== Films ===
Year	Title	Role
2007	You Got Me!	Young Amo Santander / Moe
2008	Volta	Young Perla Magtoto / Volta
2010	Hating Kapatid	Young Rica
2012	My Cactus Heart	Heart
2015	Buy Now, Die Later	Party Girl
