= AyosDito.ph =

- Company type: Private Your Marketplace in the Philippines
- Website type: Classifieds
- Available in: English
- Founded: March 2009
- Headquarters: Makati City, Philippines
- Area served: Philippines
- Owners: 701Search Pte, Ltd.
- Key people: Anna Weslien (General Manager)
- Products: Online Classifieds
- Employees: 20+ (Q3 2011)
- Website: www.AyosDito.ph
- Current status: Defunct

AyosDito.ph was an online classified-ads website for Filipinos to buy and sell online, regardless of their location in the Philippines. It was owned and operated by 701Search Pte. Ltd., which is a joint venture between media giants Singapore Press Holdings and Schibsted.

== Overview ==
Launched in March 2009, AyosDito offered free posting of ads for items such as properties, cars, electronics, food, and even jobs. The phrase "Ayos Dito" is Tagalog for "Ok here". By 2013, it became the second largest online classified ads website in the Philippines.

== Merger ==
In 2015 AyosDito formed a merger with OLX Philippines, itself acquiring former classifieds site Sulit in December 2013. Classifieds from the old site were not automatically merged with OLX, with users being sent emails asking if they want to migrate their listings to the new platform.
