= Angelito: Ang Bagong Yugto =

2012 Philippine television drama series

- Genre: Family drama
- Written by: Carmela Abaygar; Mary Rose Colindres; Kay Conlu-Brondial; Margaret Labrador; Jurey Mirafuentes; Ruel Montañez
- Directed by: Theodore C. Boborol; Neal Felix Del Rosario
- Starring: JM De Guzman; Charee Pineda; Kaye Abad; John Prats; Devon Seron; Sam Concepcion
- Opening theme: "Ika'y Mahal Pa Rin" by Jovit Baldivino
- Composer: Vehnee Saturno
- Country of origin: Philippines
- Original language: Filipino
- No. of episodes: 110

Production
- Executive producer: Ruel Bayani
- Producers: Katrina Juban; Mavic Holdago-Oducayen†
- Production location: Philippines
- Cinematography: Gary Gardoce; Jaime "Nong" Lleno
- Editors: Alexces Megan Abarquez; Peter Ashely Austria; Joseph Garcia; Gibrad Guifaya; Pamela Kim Katigbak; Michael Mariñas; Roman Rodriguez III; Sheila Tiglao
- Running time: 30-45 minutes Monday to Friday at 14:45 (PST)
- Production company: RSB Drama Unit

Original release
- Network: ABS-CBN
- Release: July 16 – December 14, 2012

Related
- Angelito: Batang Ama

Angelito: Ang Bagong Yugto (transl. Angelito: The New Chapter) is a 2012 Philippine television drama series broadcast by ABS-CBN. The series is sequel of Angelito: Batang Ama. Directed by Theodore C. Boborol and Neal Felix del Rosario, it stars JM de Guzman, Charee Pineda, Kaye Abad, John Prats, Devon Seron and Sam Concepcion. It aired on the network's Kapamilya Gold line up and worldwide on TFC from July 16 to December 14, 2012, replacing Mundo Man ay Magunaw and was replaced by MMK Klasiks.

== Plot ==
Angelito and Rosalie finally get married and start raising their son together. However, Jenny, who started a new life in Singapore at the end of the previous season, discovers she is pregnant with Angelito's child. Pledging not to reappear in Angelito's life again, she turns to her childhood friend Raffy for comfort, but circumstances prompt her to return to the Philippines and cross paths with the Santos family once more.

== Cast and characters ==
=== Main cast ===
- JM de Guzman as Angelito Santos
- Charee Pineda as Rosalie Dimaano-Santos
- John Prats as Rafael "Raffy" Montanez
- Kaye Abad as Jenny Abella-Montanez

=== Supporting cast ===
- Elizabeth Oropesa as Josephina "Pinang" Santos
- Al Tantay as Delfin Dimaano
- Snooky Serna as Adele Dimaano
- Sam Concepcion as Migoy Abella
- Devon Seron as Teresa "Tere" Santos
- Sue Ramirez as Rona Dimaano
- Kiko Estrada as Leo Samaniego
- Jobelle Salvador as Lina Abella
- Joshen Bernardo as Angelito "Jun-Jun" D. Santos Jr.
- Bea Basa as Malena Mhaica Emily "Mai-Mai" A. Ambrosio
- Felix Roco as Spongky
- Jason Francisco as Mervin
- Beauty Gonzalez as Seksi
- Josef Elizalde as Charlotte
- Eliza Pineda as Rowena Dimaano
- Mariel Pamintuan as Rachel Dimaano
- Eric Fructuoso as Larry Samaniego

=== Guest cast ===
- Jessica Connelly as Kaila Montañez
- Anika Gonzales as Ella Montañez
- Aldred Gatchalian as Rodel Dimaano
- Valerie Concepcion as Emily
- Jao Mapa as Ramon Flores
- Irma Adlawan as Sally
- Karen Reyes as Sofia
- Sitti Navarro as Susan Samaniego
- Eda Nolan as Sheila Muñoz
- Seiichi Ushimi as Lester
- Deydey Amansec as Carlo
- Hazel Chua as Amor
- Kim De Guzman as Edwina Velasco
- Farrah Florer as Rosalie's doctor
- Karen Dematera as Jamie
- Vangie Martelle as Kim
- Roy Requejo as Deng
- Jerico Redrico
- Rocky Salumbides

== See also ==
- List of programs broadcast by ABS-CBN
- List of ABS-CBN Studios original drama series
- Angelito: Batang Ama
