= Angelito: Batang Ama =

2011–12 Philippine television drama series

- Title card
- Genre: Romantic comedy; Coming-of-age; Teen drama
- Created by: ABS-CBN Studios
- Written by: Mary Rose Colindres; Kay Brondial; Jurey Mirafuentes; Mel Abaygar; Marga Labrador
- Directed by: Theodore C. Boborol; Neal Felix del Rosario
- Starring: JM de Guzman; Charee Pineda; Kaye Abad; Tom Rodriguez
- Opening theme: "Ika'y Mahal Pa Rin" by Jovit Baldivino
- Composer: Vehnee Saturno
- Country of origin: Philippines
- Original language: Filipino
- No. of episodes: 108

Production
- Executive producers: Carlo Katigbak; Cory Vidanes; Laurenti Dyogi; Ruel Bayani
- Producers: Minnella T. Abad; Adjanet F. Rase; Mavic Holdago-Oducayen†
- Cinematography: Tey Clamor; Jaime "Nong" Lleno, Jr.
- Editors: Roman Rodriguez III; Joseph Garcia; Megan Abarquez; Alexces Shiela Tiglao
- Running time: 30-45 minutes
- Production company: RSB Drama Unit

Original release
- Network: ABS-CBN
- Release: November 14, 2011 – April 13, 2012

Related
- Angelito: Ang Bagong Yugto

Angelito: Batang Ama (transl. Angelito: Young Father) is a Philippine television drama series broadcast by ABS-CBN. Directed by Theodore C. Boborol and Neal Felix del Rosario, it stars JM de Guzman, Charee Pineda, Kaye Abad and Tom Rodriguez. It aired on the network's Kapamilya Gold line up and worldwide on TFC from November 14, 2011, to April 13, 2012, replacing My Fair Lady and was replaced by Kung Ako'y Iiwan Mo.

The story revolves around Angelito, a teenager who is forced to live the bittersweet life of young fatherhood after the accidental pregnancy of his high school girlfriend.

A sequel to the series, Angelito: Ang Bagong Yugto, premiered on July 16, 2012, and ended on December 14, 2012.

Since 2016, the series has been streaming on YouTube under the name, "Angelito: Ang Batang Ama" (transl. Angelito: The Young Father).

== Plot ==
The fictional provincial town of San Vicente is home to the dysfunctional Santos family, consisting of 18-year old graduating high school student Angelito (JM de Guzman), his younger sister Teresa, nicknamed "Tere", and their grandmother Pinang (Elizabeth Oropesa), who has custody of the two following their mother's death and father's desertation. Pinang runs a small fishmonger and green grocery business in the town's wet market, and is often helped by Angelito alongside studying in order to make ends meet as well as to help save income for his desired course in college: architecture. In school, Angelito has a close circle of friends, which includes Rex, Sponky (Felix Roco), and Boyet (Carl John Barrameda). The clique often enjoys time together.

Also living in the town is the Dimaano family. The mother, Adel, works in Saudi Arabia as a domestic worker, while Delfin remains in the Philippines, working as a security guard. The couple have five children: Rolan, Rosalie, Rhona, Richelle, and Rowena. Rolan (Matt Evans) is a close friend of Angelito and a member of his clique. Rosalie (Charee Pineda), on the other hand, was Angelito's schoolmate and a well-known honour student, and is now Rolan's batchmate because Angelito's clique repeated a year level twice. Due to her intelligence and wisdom, Rosalie was groomed by the Dimaanos to be their new breadwinner who would eventually lift them all from poverty after graduation. Thus, she studied earnestly and did not entertain any of her suitors.

For a long time, Angelito was attracted to Rosalie. As one of her more persistent suitors, Angelito expressed his affection for her and started courting her. They first became friends and eventually, lovers. The relationship grew stronger after Angelito defended her from a group of teenage thugs who were involved in a brawl with his clique. However, Rolan, despite being a close friend of Angelito, opposed their relationship. The Dimaanos also opposed the friendship and forced them to separate but this proves futile.

One evening, Rosalie turns to Angelito for solace at a beach after Delfin and Adel had an argument on money matters. A heavy rainstorm cuts their walk home from the hangout, forcing them to take shelter in an abandoned hut. There, Angelito confesses his love for her once more and the two had sexual intercourse. Sometime later, Rosalie discovers that she was pregnant but she and Angelito continue to hide her pregnancy. The Dimaano family also discovers this after finding a pregnancy test kit in the laundry, wherein of the Dimaano sisters, Rhona (Sue Ramirez), is mistakenly identified as the owner.

Pinang becomes outraged of Rosalie's pregnancy after Angelito confides to her about the incident. They head to the Dimaano household to for a proper resolution only to be met with threats by Delfin and Rolan, who in turn violently assault Angelito. The ordeal ends when Rosalie defends Angelito just as Rolan is about to trash a rock at the latter's head while village watchmen arrive in response to the commotion. As a heavily injured Angelito is hospitalized with a broken/dislocated left arm, Pinang the forbids any communication with Rosalie or the Dimaanos.

Three days later, Delfin orders Rosalie not to attend classes due to her situation but Adel insists that Rosalie continues schooling and finish her studies as she is the running valedictorian, to which Delfin reluctantly agrees on the condition she never meets Angelito. At school, news of the Dimaano household fight spreads as Rosalie and Angelito take their respective examinations. After the examinations, the adviser of Angelito's section advises Rolan to avoid any wrongdoing as it would compromise the situation not only of his family but also Rosalie's. As Angelito tries to sort things out with Rosalie, his two friends, Boyet and Spongky warn him of Rolan's boiling rage and that Rex has been closely monitoring Rolan himself since the ordeal. Meanwhile, a confrontation between Rolan and a group of jocks talking about Rosalie's pregnancy erupts into a fight instigated by the former, causing Rex and an assistant principal to intervene; the latter ordering Rosalie to take Rolan home.

During Angelito's road to recovery and after a slight altercation with Rolan, he learns that Rosalie's family is planning to move out of town. With the growing conflict between the Santoses and Dimaanos, Angelito and Rosalie eloped in a rural area. Their landlady, Aling Belen, served as a mother figure to them as they coped with early parenting. There, Angelito begins his search for a job and manages to land a position as a butcher and part-time janitor at a local slaughterhouse.

Despite his hard work at the slaughterhouse, his earnings were insufficient for his new family. Several months later, Rosalie gives birth to their son named Angelito Dimaano-Santos Jr. or Junjun by nickname. There, Angelito struggles as a young father learning the ropes of raising a child to finding better jobs to provide for his son's needs. Eventually, he and Rosalie decided to return home after their son's birth. Both their families supported them financially and emotionally but the Dimaanos still expressed disapproval of Angelito although Adel tries hard to approve of and understand his hardships. Rosalie returns to school to complete her unfinished term of last year of basic education.

Rolan however, still continues his vendetta for Angelito by an attempt to harm and murder Tere. This ends in failure when a heavily intoxicated Rolan inadvertently sets ablaze a warehouse Tere was hiding in after stumbling on furniture. Fortunately, Spongky manages to rescue Tere from the burning structure. After Rolan tries to harm Angelito and Junjun as he gets home, he is arrested and charged with arson and then imprisoned.

Later on, Cecil, a relative of the Dimaanos who works and lives in the United States, visits the family and meet up Angelito and his son. Rosalie's parents agreed that Cecil adopt the child. What Angelito did was to bring the child to Manila and initially, Rosalie was supposed to be with them but she chose to stay with her family and focus on finishing basic education instead, especially when her father Delfin suffers a near-fatal heat attack. As time went on, she tried to find Angelito and Junjun but failed because Pinang hindered her. After Rosalie finishes her basic education, she and her family move to Manila for college.

In Manila, after nearly losing Junjun to homeless people, Angelito finds safety with two new friends, one of them being Mervin (Jason Francisco). Through these two friends, Angelito manages to get a job as a carpenter at an under-construction building and befriends his employer, a foreman. While at work, the foreman also helps take care of and nurse Junjun.

The circumstances would be difficult for Angelito since he would be raising Junjun alone. Angelito never stopped looking for Rosalie since he still loved her. Despite the difficulties, Angelito was able to fulfill his responsibilities as a father with the help of Jenny Ambrosio (Kaye Abad), who was also a single parent with a daughter named Maymay, whom Junjun became a playmate of and best friend. Due to Jenny's care, Junjun also regarded her as a second mother-figure. Angelito and Junjun rented a house while Jenny and Maymay lived in a separate house. Pinang moves to Manila and reunites with Angelito.

After five years, Rosalie and Angelito reunite. However this time, Rosalie, now an education graduate and successful flight attendant while also being a Licensure Examination for Teachers topnotcher, acted indifferently towards Angelito due to her new boyfriend, womanizing airline pilot Andrew Posadas (Tom Rodriguez). During the wedding anniversary of the Dimaano couple, Andrew reunites the family with a newly released Rolan. After a tearful reunion, Andrew and his mother Helen help Rolan find a job wherein the latter manages to get an entry job in a mall warehouse from which he was later fired after being unjustly accused of theft (later revealed to be Spongky's doing). Tere moves to Manila to begin college and starts a friendship with a class/schoolmate named Migoy (Sam Concepcion), the musically obsessive son of a wealthy lawyer and a businesswoman.

Rosalie brings Junjun to the Dimaano household wherein she introduces him. Although the Dimaano's enjoy a bonding with Junjun, Rolan is not pleased to see him, especially when he lashes out at Junjun when the latter asks him for a bond. A heavily traumatized Junjun declares that he would not want to visit the household anymore.

When Angelito and Rosalie attempt to reconcile their love, Rolan catches them in the act and a brawl ensues between him and Angelito wherein the former threatens the latter with death. After the fight, Rolan reveals to the Dimaanos of his five-year suffering since his transfer to New Bilibid Prison. Rosalie then forced herself to believe that she did not care for Angelito and only wanted to be with Junjun. She asked Angelito to let her take care of Junjun with the latter not allowing her. As a result, Andrew urged her to file a custody case in court.

Angelito had to prove to the court that he was capable of raising the Junjun alone. Unfortunately, the court grants Junjun's custody to Rosalie and Angelito can do nothing but to let the child live with his mother. He then focused on his relationship with Jenny despite still being in love with Rosalie.

Junjun found it hard to understand the family setup because he wanted to be with both parents. At first Rosalie thought that her son would adopt to the situation, thinking that she got what she wanted by taking Junjun back, but later decided to return him to Angelito after realizing the boy's pain of being away from his father. To satisfy Junjun's needs of being with both parents, Rosalie and Angelito bond on some occasions and also have Junjun spend quality time with Angelito such as staying in his house on weekends. However, there was another setback in Rosalie' life in the form of an empty relationship. Despite being in a relationship with Andrew, her feelings for Angelito began to resurface undeniably even if her family still opposed him.

There was still tensions arising from the custody battle, especially after Rolan learns of Junjun being with Angelito. One night, after Rosalie and Andrew joined the Santoses and their friends in a beach outing, Andrew then takes advantage of Rosalie by stalking her and then attempting to rape her in her house. Days later, the two got in an argument of what happened and about Andrew's behavior. Delfin overhears the heated conversation and coerces Andrew to leave with a threat to kill him. These incidents began Rosalie and Andrew's breakup.

Later on, as Andrew attempts to reconcile with Rosalie, he gets involved in a car accident after trying to contact her while driving. Helen prohibits Rosalie from visiting Andrew at the hospital after knowing of what happened between the two. Rosalie and her mother Adel bond over the frustrations the former experienced while being with Andrew and the breakup. Rolan overhears them and goes into a heated argument about the topic, concluding that Rosalie plans to return with Angelito, which he had long opposed as he blames Angelito and his child for his misfortunes. Delfin then subdues Rolan as he attempts to argue even further. Rolan later becomes a fugitive for carnapping.

At Spongky's home later that night, Rolan reveals to the former of his diabolical plan of killing either Angelito or Junjun. As he states that his plan will not stop until either of the Santos father and son is dead, Spongky admonishes Rolan by reminding the latter of his status as a wanted fugitive, adding of Junjun's part in the Dimaano bloodline and taking away Angelito's life would only bring more burden to Junjun.

To make matters worse, by the next day, Rolan, now a most wanted criminal, takes Junjun hostage during a family outing to express his rage towards Angelito. Migoy and Mervin try to intervene to stop Rolan and keep Junjun safe but are outmatched; with Migoy angered after Rolan reveals the arson incident that nearly killed Tere. News of the incident spreads as the commotions proceeds. As Angelito and Rosalie learn of the incident, they rush to the venue of the crime. Sponky tries to negotiate with Rolan to little avail as one of Angelito's friends and workmates, Mervin, alerts the police.

Police arrive and try to negotiate with Rolan to release Junjun but Rolan refuses. Rolan then tells Angelito of the time he tried to kill Junjun by running him over with a motorcycle. After a heated exchange of words, Rolan releases Junjun but then shoots at Angelito wherein Rosalie is hit. Police fire two fatal shots on him. Rosalie and Rolan were then taken to separate hospitals wherein they recuperate fully.

After the hostage crisis, at the hospital where Rosalie is confined, her parents Delfin and Adel try make amends with Angelito's family of their misgivings and misdeeds. Soon, Rolan is imprisoned once again and Rosalie reconciles with Andrew before they break up and part ways in good hands as she tries to gain Angelito's heart. She then resigns from her job as a flight attendant as Andrew recovers and goes back to his duties.

After Angelito makes amends with the Dimaanos, he and Andrew make amends and become friends. Although Jenny is willing to do everything for Angelito, the latter chooses to sever his relationship with her as he knows that Junjun and Rosalie were more important to him. Tere and Migoy start a relationship, to Angelito's approval.

Angelito then returns home to San Vicente where he grew up in his search for Rosalie. At the shores where he and Rosalie used to hang out, he encounters a young student couple from his school who reminded him of his relationship with Rosalie. Recounting the struggles of young fatherhood, he converses with them. The boy (CJ Navato) reveals that the shore is their secret hangout only known to them while the girl (Fretzie Bercede) adds of Rosalie visiting the spot and giving them advice on how to have a happy and healthy relationship. Angelito gives the couple a similar advice with information and warnings of the dangers of young parenthood before ending the talk by motivating them to avoid premarital sex. As the couple thank him, Rosalie and Angelito reunite and head to a waterfall quarry which was once a hangout for his peer group. They realize of the importance of having a complete family and managed to restore their relationship at the end as they live together with Junjun a normal family life.

== Cast and characters ==
=== Main cast ===
- JM de Guzman as Angelito Santos - Jun-jun's father, Mai-Mai's adoptive father, Jenny's husband, Tere's brother and Pinang's eldest grandson.
- Charee Pineda as Rosalie Dimaano - Jun-jun's mother, Angelito's girlfriend, Andrew's fiancée, Delfin and Adel's firstborn daughter and Rolan, Rona, Rowena and Rachelle's sister.
- Kaye Abad as Jenny Ambrosio - Angelito's wife, Jun-jun's adoptive mother, Mai-Mai's mother, Tere's sister and Pinang's eldest granddaughter.
- Tom Rodriguez as Andrew Posadas - Rosalie's fiancé.

=== Supporting cast ===
- Elizabeth Oropesa as Amparo "Pinang" Santos
- Devon Seron as Teresa "Tere" Santos - Angelito and Jenny's sister and Jun-jun's aunt
- Sue Ramirez as Rona Dimaano - Rosalie, Rolan, Rowena and Rachelle's sister and Delfin and Adel's daughter.
- Eliza Pineda as Rowena Dimaano - Rosalie, Rolan, Rona and Rachelle's middle sister and Delfin and Adel's middle daughter.
- Mariel Pamintuan as Rachel Dimaano - Rosalie, Rolan, Rona and Rowena's youngest sister and Delfin and Adel's youngest daughter.
- Matt Evans as Rolan Dimaano - Rosalie, Rona, Rowena and Rachelle's brother and Delfin and Adel's young
- Snooky Serna as Adel Dimaano - Delfin's wife, Rosalie, Rolan, Rona, Rowena and Rachelle's mother, and Jun-jun's grandmother.
- Al Tantay as Delfin Dimaano - Adel's husband, Rosalie, Rolan, Rona, Rowena and Rachelle's father, and Jun-jun's grandfather.
- Joshen Bernardo as Angelito "Jun-jun" Dimaano Santos Jr.
- Bea Basa as Malena Mhaica Emily "Mai-Mai" Ambrosio
- Felix Roco as Spongky
- Sam Concepcion as Migoy Abella
- Dennis Padilla as Fulgencio "Pol" Dela Torre
- Jason Francisco as Mervin
- Beauty Gonzalez as Seksi
- Josef Elizalde as Charlotte
- Lemuel Pelayo as Arthur
- Jobelle Salvador as Lina Abella
- Matthew Mendoza as Raymond Abella
- Kyra Custodio as Juret Villaflor
- Aldred Gatchalian as Rodel Dimaano

=== Guest cast ===
- Carl John Barrameda as Boyet
- Benjamin de Guzman as Rex
- Bianca Casado as Daisy
- Eslove Briones as Rowel
- Michael Flores as Del
- Justin Cuyugan as BJ
- Princess Manzon as Shane

=== Special participation ===
- Daisy Cariño as Gemma
- Daria Ramirez as Belen
- Ina Feleo as Precious
- Racquel Montesa as Cecile
- Jommy Teotico as Bart
- Dionne Monsanto as Mira
- Shey Bustamante as Ailyn
- Rochelle Barrameda as Candice
- Pocholo Montes as Amorsolo Pineda
- Jojit Lorenzo as Tomas Bernardo
- Racquel Villavicencio as Helen Posadas
- Susan Africa as Carmen Santo
- Mark Luz as Andrew
- Joseph Andre Garcia as young Angelito
- Jadise Cruz as Aya, Tere's classmate

== Sequel ==
The story continues in Angelito: Ang Bagong Yugto (lit. Angelito: The New Chapter), which premiered on July 16, 2012.

== See also ==
- List of programs broadcast by ABS-CBN
- List of ABS-CBN Studios original drama series
- Angelito: Ang Bagong Yugto
