= Sue Ramirez =

Filipino actress (born 1996)

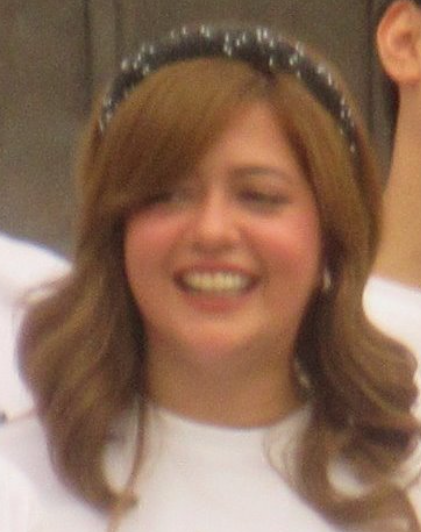
- Born: Sue Anna Garina Dodd; July 20, 1996 (age 30); Parañaque, Metro Manila, Philippines
- Citizenship: Philippines; United States
- Occupations: Actress; model; singer
- Years active: 2010–present
- Agents: Star Magic (2010–present); TV5 Network (2020–21, 2023–present); Brightlight Productions (2020–21); Advanced Media Broadcasting System (2024–present)
- Musical career
- Genres: OPM; Pop
- Instrument: Vocals
- Label: Star Music

Sue Anna Garina Dodd (born July 20, 1996), known professionally as Sue Ramirez, is a Filipino actress. Her first major role was as a supporting cast member on the ABS-CBN remake of the TV drama Mula sa Puso (2011). She appeared in the television dramas Angelito: Batang Ama (2011–12), Angelito: Ang Bagong Yugto (2012), Annaliza (2013–14), Pangako Sa 'Yo (2015), Dolce Amore (2016), La Luna Sangre (2017), Hanggang Saan (2017–18), FPJ's Ang Probinsyano (2018) and A Soldier's Heart (2020). She was nominated in the 32nd PMPC Star Awards for Movies for New Movie Actress of the Year for the film Just the Way You Are (2015).

== Early life ==
Sue Anna Garina Dodd was born in Parañaque, Philippines. Her Filipino mother, Concepcion Garina, is from Sipalay, Negros Occidental, and her father, James Peter Dodd, is a retired senior officer of the United States Department of State. Sue is the youngest among her siblings, with two sisters and two brothers; only she has dual Filipino and American citizenship. She attended high school at Sacred Heart School in Parañaque. Ramirez's father died in 2013, while her mother died in 2026.

== Career ==
=== 2010–2012: Early work ===
In 2010, Ramirez auditioned for Star Magic with the song "Angels Brought Me Here" by Guy Sebastian, and was accepted, with her first project with ABS-CBN being teen variety show Shoutout! She entered show business with the hopes of paying for her father's medical expenses.

Ramirez began her acting career playing Nicole Matias in the ABS-CBN remake of Mula sa Puso. Her character is the only child of the antagonists Ysmael Matias and Selina Pereira-Matias, who goes against her parents and becomes associated with the protagonist, Olivia "Via" Pereira-Amarillo. The series premiered in March 2011 and ran for one season with ninety-eight episodes. Anna Larrucea was originally cast for her role. In the same year, Ramirez made her film debut with a minor role in Aswang, followed by a supporting role in ABS-CBN's drama television series Angelito: Batang Ama.

Ramirez's lead role in ABS-CBN's 2012 remake of !Oka Tokat is often cited as her second major role. She portrayed Luna, the clairvoyant haunted by her ability of foresight, who strives to hone and accept her ability while experiencing difficulties in belonging in the community. She was paired with Paul Salas as her first "love team" partner. The series premiered in February 2012 and ran for one season with fifteen episodes. In the same year, Ramirez reprised her role in the sequel to ABS-CBN's drama television series Angelito: Batang Ama, followed by a supporting role in an episode in ABS-CBN's anthology drama Maalaala Mo Kaya – Baul.

=== 2013–2014: Further acting ===
In 2013, Ramirez starred as Luisa "Louie" Celerez in ABS-CBN's Annaliza, the remake of the television series of the same name produced by GMA Network. She was announced to be part of the supporting cast after ABS-CBN's announcement that they have received the rights to remake the television series from the original director, Gil C. Soriano.

In 2014, Ramirez appeared in another episode in ABS-CBN's anthology drama Maalaala Mo Kaya – Panyo, followed by a supporting role in an episode in ABS-CBN's dramatization of actual cases brought and settled in the Supreme Court and Court of Appeals, as well as a special participation in ABS-CBN's comedy drama Dream Dad.

=== 2015–2017: Breakthrough ===
In 2015, Ramirez starred as Michelle Gutierrez in a series of episodes in ABS-CBN's Wansapanataym, followed by a special participation in the Nasaan Ka Nang Kailangan Kita remake of the film of the same name. In the same year, Ramirez participated in the fourth batch of the fifth season of Kapamilya, Deal or No Deal, hosted by Luis Manzano, where she was chosen to play in the May 13, 2015 episode and received ₱100,000. Ramirez once again appeared in two episodes in Maalaala Mo Kaya – Shattered Dreams and Maalaala Mo Kaya – Selfless Love and a supporting role in the afternoon drama series All of Me as Kristel Sebastian.

Ramirez gained further popularity after joining the second half (Book 2) of the teleserye Pangako Sa 'Yo (2015) as Joy "Ligaya" Miranda, the "third wheel" of the show's primary "love team" Yna Macaspac (Kathryn Bernardo) and Angelo Buenavista (Daniel Padilla). In the same year, Sue Ramirez received her first nomination in the 32nd PMPC Star Awards for Movies as New Movie Actress of the Year for the film Just the Way You Are (2015).

In 2016, Ramirez was given the role of Angel (Serena's biological sister played by Liza Soberano) in Dolce Amore and topbilled the viral story of Genesis, a Filipino artist who sold his paintings for a mother who suffered from severe illness in Maalaala Mo Kaya – Paru-paro. She also joined the longest-running musical variety show in the Philippines ASAP. In the same year, Ramirez was chosen to be the new Honorary Tourism Ambassador for Korea to the Philippines, replacing actress Jessy Mendiola.

Year after, Ramirez appeared as the Young Margaret Divinagracia played by Coney Reyes in 2017 Philippine fantasy drama My Dear Heart and as one of the celebrity contestants in the Philippine adaptation of Israeli reality show I Can Do That. In the same year, Ramirez had a reunion with the loveteam Kathniel in the horror-action fantasy drama television series La Luna Sangre.

In the last quarter of 2017, Sue Ramirez led the cast of the horror movie The Debutantes together with Miles Ocampo, Michelle Vito, Jane de Leon and Chanel Morales. She joined the Main Cast of the Philippine television drama series Hanggang Saan with veteran actress Sylvia Sanchez became part of the 2017 Metro Manila Film Festival entry Meant to Beh: Ika-something na Utos with Vic Sotto and Dawn Zulueta.

=== 2018–present: Current projects ===
In 2018, she starred in a romantic movie with Jameson Blake titled Ang Babaeng Allergic sa WiFi.

She appeared in FPJ's Ang Probinsyano as Marie, the happy-go-lucky granddaughter of an elderly couple who harbored the Vendetta.

In 2019, she portrayed a full-service sex worker in the film Cuddle Weather alongside RK Bagatsing.

In 2020, she joined A Soldier's Heart, the leading lady of Gerald Anderson.

From January 24 to June 24, 2022, she portrayed Lexy Lucero, a woman in a relationship with a married man in The Broken Marriage Vow as main antagonist.

In the same year, she appeared in The Iron Heart as Venus Magbanua, the leading lady of Richard Gutierrez who works with him previously in La Luna Sangre.

From October 20, 2025 to April 1, 2026, she portrayed Mel Barrera-Montenegro in What Lies Beneath.

== Personal life ==
Ramirez previously had a relationship with actor and dancer Joao Constancia from 2017 to 2019. She dated actor and politician Javi Benitez from 2019 to 2024.

Currently, she is in a relationship with actor Dominic Roque.

== Filmography ==
=== Film ===
Key
†	Denotes films that have not yet been released

Sue Ramirez's film credits with year of release, film titles and roles
Year	Title	Role	Ref.
2011	Aswang	Younger Stella	
2015	Just the Way You Are	Driana Sison	
2015	A Second Chance	Marie	
2017	The Debutantes	Kate Angeles	
2017	Meant to Beh: Ika-something na Utos	Rihanna Biglang-awa	
2018	Ang Babaeng Allergic sa WiFi	Norma Villanueva	
2019	Sunshine Family	Shine	
2019	I'm Ellenya L.		
2019	Cuddle Weather	Adela Johnson	
2019	Dead Kids	Janina	
2020	Love Lockdown	Abby	
2020	Finding Agnes	Cathy Duvera	
2021	Princess Dayareese	Ally	
2021	Mommy Issues	Katya	
2021	Boyfriend No. 13	Kimverly "Kim" Santillan	
2023	Rewind	Vivian Pastrana	
2024	How To Slay A Nepo Baby	Ada	
2024	The Kingdom	Dayang Lualhati Nandula	
2025	In Between		
2025	Lasting Moments		
2025	Flower Girl	Ena	
2025	One Hit Wonder	Lorina	
2026	Project Baby	Sandy	

=== Television ===
Key
†	Denotes shows that have not yet been aired

Sue Ramirez's television credits with year of release, title(s) and role
Year	Title	Role	Ref.
2011	Mula sa Puso	Nicole Matias	
2011	Angelito: Batang Ama	Rona Dimaano	
2012	Oka2kat	Luna	
2012	Angelito: Ang Bagong Yugto	Rona Dimaano	
2012	Maalaala Mo Kaya: Baunan	Rachel	
2012–present	ASAP	Herself / Performer	
2013–2014	Annaliza	Luisa "Louie" Celerez	
2014	Maalaala Mo Kaya: Panyo	Susan	
2014	Ipaglaban Mo: Ang Totoong Ako	Corrine	
2014	Dream Dad	Young Carmen	
2015	Nasaan Ka Nang Kailangan Kita	Young Cecilia Macaraig	
2015	Kapamilya, Deal or No Deal	Contestant/Herself - One of the Lucky Stars No. 9	
2015	Ipaglaban Mo: Pagkakasala ng Ama	Lita	
2015	Wansapanataym Presents: Remote ni Eric	Michelle Gutierrez	
2015	Maalaala Mo Kaya: Entablado	Liza	
2015	Maalaala Mo Kaya: Eye Glasses	Mary	
2015	All of Me	Kristel Sebastian	
2015	Pangako Sa 'Yo	Joy "Ligaya" Miranda	
2016	Dolce Amore	Angela "Angel" Urtola	
2016	Ipaglaban Mo: Kidnap	Diane Santiago	
2016	Maalaala Mo Kaya: Paruparo	Genesis	
2017	My Dear Heart	Young Margaret Divinagracia	
2017	La Luna Sangre	Catleya	
2017–2018	Hanggang Saan	Anna Lamoste	
2018	Ipaglaban Mo: Sakal	Cristine Soriano	
2018	FPJ's Ang Probinsyano	Marie Espinosa	
2019	Unlisted	Herself	
2020	A Soldier's Heart	Lourdes "Lourd" Bacalso	
2020–2021	Oh My Dad!	Lenlen Balderama	
2022	K-Love	Val	
2022	The Broken Marriage Vow	Alexis "Lexy" Lucero	
2022–2023	The Iron Heart	Venus Magbanua	
2023–2024	Jack and Jill sa Diamond Hills	Maureen Cabigting / Jill Corporal	
2024	It's Showtime	Herself / Performer	
2025–2026	What Lies Beneath	Amelia Grace "Mel" Barrera-Montenegro	
2026	Sigabo	Tekla	

=== Music video appearances ===
Year	Title	Performer	Director	Ref.
2020	Masyado Pang Maaga	Ben&Ben	Jorel Lising	

=== Theater ===
Year	Title	Role	Ref.
2024	Little Shop of Horrors (Manila)	Audrey	
2026	The Effect	Connie Hall	

== Awards and nominations ==
Year	Award Ceremony	Notable Work	Category	Result
2015	6th TV Craze Awards	—N/a	Most Promising Actress of the Year	Won
2016	32nd PMPC Star Awards for Movies	Just The Way You Are	New Movie Actress of the Year	Nominated
2016	ASAP Pop Viewers' Choice Awards	—N/a	Pop Sweetheart of the Year	Nominated
2016	ASAP Pop Viewers' Choice Awards	—N/a	Pop Love Teen with Ronnie Alonte	Nominated
2017	Myx Music Awards 2017	—N/a	Favorite MYX Celebrity VJ	Nominated
2017	FHM Philippines 2017	—N/a	100 Sexiest in the World	Rank 62
2017	YouTube Philippines	Your Love (song cover)	Top Trending Music Videos of 2017 Philippines	Rank 9
2018	Wish 107.5 Music Awards	Your Love (song cover)	Bronze Wishclusive Elite Circle	Won
2018	Wish 107.5 Music Awards	Your Love (song cover)	Silver Wishclusive Elite Circle	Won
2018	Wish 107.5 Music Awards	Your Love (song cover)	Wishclusive Ballad Performance of the Year	Nominated
2018	Wish 107.5 Music Awards	—N/a	Wish Promising Artist of the Year	Nominated
2019	Wish 107.5 Music Awards	While We Are Young (song cover)	Wishclusive Pop Performance of the Year	Nominated
2020	Wish 107.5 Music Awards	Your Love (song cover)	Gold Wishclusive Elite Circle	Won
2020	7th Urduja Heritage Film Awards	Cuddle Weather	Best Actress in Comedy or Musical	Won
2024	Anak TV Seal Awards	—N/a	Net Makabata Star	Nominated
2024	15th Gawad Buhay Awards	Little Shop of Horrors (Manila)	Female Lead Performance in a Musical	Won (3rd Quarter Citation)
2025	15th Gawad Buhay Awards	Little Shop of Horrors (Manila)	Female Lead Performance in a Musical	Nominated

== Discography ==
=== Major concerts ===
Date	Title	Venue	Note	Ref
July 19, 2019	Rock Chic	Music Museum	first ever solo concert	
July 8, 2017	4 of a Kind: The Unforgettable Concert	Music Museum	together with Kristel Fulgar; Maris Racal; Loisa Andalio	
October 2, 2016	Double Hearts Digital Concert	ABS-CBN Studio 3	together with Kristel Fulgar; Maris Racal; Loisa Andalio	

=== Music ===
Year	Song	Label	Note	Ref
2016	Ako Sa'Yo	Star Music	First single	
2016	Salamat (Star Music All-Stars)	Star Music	1M subscribers for Star Music YouTube channel	
2017	Ikaw Ang Sunshine Ko, Isang Pamilya Tayo		ABS-CBN Summer Station ID 2017	
2018	In Lab Na in Lab	Star Music	Dolce Amore OST (original soundtrack) #ChooseAmore #ChooseLove	
2020	Hawak Kamay (Star Magic artists)	Star Music	Star Magic artists support of solidarity to the network amidst franchise renewal issue	

== Magazine cover ==
Issue	Magazine	Notes
January 2016	Spotted Philippines	SQUARE ONE: Bold Moves, Greater Heights
July 2016	Mega Style Philippines	Sue Ramirez: Her Other Side
June 2017	Metro Magazine	Metro's 28th Year and Star Magic's 25th Anniversary
July 2017	Inside Showbiz Weekly	Girls on Fire
August 2017	Mega Magazine	Women to Watch
December 2017	Liwayway Magazine	Sue Ramirez
August 2018	Village Pipol Magazine	Special Digital Edition featuring Sue Ramirez
August 2018	Liwayway Magazine	Sue Ramirez
February 2019	Speed Magazine	Sue Ramirez
