= List of Muling Buksan ang Puso episodes =

The following is a list of episodes of ABS-CBN's Muling Buksan ang Puso, which stars Julia Montes, Enrique Gil, and Enchong Dee. The soap opera premiered on July 8, 2013, and centers on three generations of love and betrayal, and how the sins of the past continue to haunt two families whose lives are destined to be intertwined. The show replaced Apoy Sa Dagat, which ended on July 5, 2013, and took over the time slot previously occupied by Huwag Ka Lang Mawawala. Muling Buksan ang Puso aired at 8:30pm (PST), Mondays to Fridays during Primetime Bida. The pilot episode ranked #2 on the night of July 8, 2013 with a rating of 28.4%. On August 26, 2013, Muling Buksan ang Puso moved to a later timeslot at 9:30-10:15pm.

== Series overview ==
Season	Episodes	Originally released	
Season	Episodes	First released	Last released
1	35	July 8, 2013	August 23, 2013
2	30	August 26, 2013	October 4, 2013

== Episodes summary ==
=== Season 1 ===
No. overall	No. in season	Title	Directed by	Written by	Ratings	Original release date	Nightly rank
1	1	"Episode 1"	Nuel C. Naval, Manny Q. Palo, Jojo A. Saguin	Rondel P. Lindayag	28.4%	July 8, 2013	#2
Though raised in different worlds, Carissa and Marietta remain best friends through the years despite their respective mother's objection. Carissa lives a life of luxury with her adoptive mother Adelina — the owner of the biggest desiccated coconut plant in San Felipe.
2	2	"Episode 2"	Nuel C. Naval, Manny Q. Palo, Jojo A. Saguin	Rondel P. Lindayag	26.9%	July 9, 2013	#3
Carissa and Ricardo’s secret love affair begins to take its toll after Marietta discovers their romance and anonymously informs Adelina about it. To make things worse, the news about Ricardo’s real identity and the criminal charges against him are soon exposed and reach Adelina and Carissa who is pregnant with Ricardo’s child. Marietta, on the other hand, also bears a child after spending the night with Ignacio when her heart gets broken once again.
3	3	"Episode 3"	Nuel C. Naval, Manny Q. Palo, Jojo A. Saguin	Rondel P. Lindayag	27.7%	July 10, 2013	#3
Refusing to follow Adelina’s order to put up her baby for adoption, Carissa chooses to leave home and seeks refuge at Marietta’s house. Coincidentally, Carissa gives birth to her baby on the same night as Marietta delivers her child. However, Marietta’s son is diagnosed with a heart defect. Thinking that the baby has a better chance of surviving with Carissa’s well-off family, Marietta follows Elvira’s advice to switch her son with Carissa’s daughter.
4	4	"Episode 4"	Nuel C. Naval, Manny Q. Palo, Jojo A. Saguin	Rondel P. Lindayag	28.2%	July 11, 2013	#2
Adelina and Carissa take baby Francis to the United States to treat his heart. With her friend and son gone, Marietta is left to endure 16 years of caring for Sarah, Carissa's real child. The past continues to haunt Marietta, and Sarah only serves as its painful reminder. Sarah grows without knowing why her mother hates her so and what, in her infancy, was so quickly stolen from her.
5	5	"Episode 5"	Nuel C. Naval, Manny Q. Palo, Jojo A. Saguin	Rondel P. Lindayag	28.7%	July 12, 2013	#2
After recovering from fatigue caused by juggling her studies with work, Sarah finally enters the mansion she has longed to see. What Sarah does not know is that the mansion's owners have returned to San Felipe. As she roams the halls, she is drawn to Francis and his beautiful music.
6	6	"Episode 6"	Nuel C. Naval, Manny Q. Palo, Jojo A. Saguin	Rondel P. Lindayag, Ma. Regina Amigo	27.5%	July 15, 2013	#3
While Sarah finds herself mesmerized by the boy she saw in the mansion, Francis mistakes Sarah and Natalia for thieves. After closing the deal with the buyers of her mansion, Adelina throws a party for all residents of San Felipe. At the party, Marietta finally gets the chance to meet Francis.
7	7	"Episode 7"	Nuel C. Naval, Manny Q. Palo, Jojo A. Saguin	Ma. Regina Amigo	27.4%	July 16, 2013	#3
Marietta’s inexplicable bliss over seeing Francis confuses everyone especially Francis and Bernardo. Sarah and Leonel, who follow Marietta to the party, try to befriend the seemingly uninterested Francis. Meanwhile, a short but heated confrontation with Adelina brings back Elvira’s sweet childhood memories with Bernardo until Adelina came into their lives.
8	8	"Episode 8"	Nuel C. Naval, Manny Q. Palo	Rondel P. Lindayag	29.6%	July 17, 2013	#2
Francis and Sarah's tour of the coconut plantation ends in an accident as Francis falls off the coconut tree after agreeing to a dare. The incident alarms Marietta and she puts the blame on Sarah. Meanwhile, Edmund and Carissa decide to relocate in Manila to help Adelina with her business. While Marietta feels sad about losing the chance to spend time with her real child, Carissa shares to Sarah her strange feeling of attachment with San Felipe.
9	9	"Episode 9"	Nuel C. Naval, Manny Q. Palo, Jojo A. Saguin	Ma. Regina Amigo	28.7%	July 18, 2013	#2
Sheltered all his life, Francis takes his frustration out on Carissa. To make him happy, Carissa gives Francis a bit of freedom and lets him explore Manila alone. Meanwhile, Marietta allows Sarah to study in Manila and decides to move the rest of the family to the city as well. As her family prepares to leave their hometown, Sarah takes one last look at the mansion in San Felipe and meets Nicolas for the first time.
10	10	"Episode 10"	Nuel C. Naval, Manny Q. Palo	Ma. Regina Amigo	28.4%	July 19, 2013	#2
Nicolas returns to Carissa and Marietta's lives.
11	11	"Episode 11"	Nuel C. Naval, Manny Q. Palo	Ma. Regina Amigo	26.6%	July 22, 2013	#3
Nicolas rushes to confront Carissa upon learning that she had a child out of wedlock. As Adelina and Carissa refuse to clear things up, Francis becomes confused regarding Nicolas’ intentions toward his family. Meanwhile, Sarah’s attempt to help out Nicolas with his problem puts a strain on her closeness with Carissa.
12	12	"Episode 12"	Nuel C. Naval, Manny Q. Palo	Ma. Regina Amigo	27.8%	July 23, 2013	#3
While searching for answers about Nicolas’ intentions toward his family, Francis stumbles upon the shocking revelation that Nicolas is allegedly his real father. As Marietta and Carissa insist to Nicolas that he is not Francis’ father, Nicolas aims to undergo a DNA test with Francis to put an end to all his questions.
13	13	"Episode 13"	Nuel C. Naval, Manny Q. Palo	Mariami Tanangco-Domingo	30.4%	July 24, 2013	#2
Carissa stubbornly opposes Nicolas’ request to undergo a DNA test with Francis. Meanwhile, Sarah’s family faces a new problem as Marietta gets diagnosed with dengue fever. Trouble escalates between the two families as Elvira insists on getting Bernardo’s share of the coconut plantation’s profit from Adelina. To help pay for Marietta’s hospital bills, Sarah decides to work for Carissa leading her to an embarrassing situation with Francis. At the hospital, Elvira sees a familiar face from the past.
14	14	"Episode 14"	Nuel C. Naval, Manny Q. Palo	Mariami Tanangco-Domingo	28.5%	July 25, 2013	#3
Learning about Edmund’s medical condition paves the way for Francis to finally learn that Nicolas is his real father. Adelina reprimands Carissa for telling Francis about his biological father. Sarah, on the other hand, begins to doubt if she is Marietta’s daughter. Meanwhile, Marietta thanks her friends and family--including Sarah--for helping her through her illness. The next day, Francis reconciles with Edmund and asks him and Carissa for permission to meet Nicolas.
15	15	"Episode 15"	Nuel C. Naval, Manny Q. Palo	Mariami Tanangco-Domingo	30.6%	July 26, 2013	#2
Francis’s attempt to know Nicolas better gets an untimely end when Adelina learns that Francis drank liquor during one of his visits. Meanwhile, Bernardo discovers the truth behind Sarah and Francis’s real identities after meeting Ika, the midwife who assisted Marietta's and Carissa's childbirths 17 years ago
16	16	"Episode 16"	Nuel C. Naval, Manny Q. Palo	Mariami Tanangco-Domingo	28.4%	July 29, 2013	#2
Bernardo finds himself torn between protecting his family from Adelina and correcting Elvira and Marietta’s past mistake. While Francis and Sarah’s friendship continues to flourish, Adelina and Carissa plan to bring Francis back to America to keep him away from Nicolas for good.
17	17	"Episode 17"	Nuel C. Naval, Manny Q. Palo	Mariami Tanangco-Domingo	30.5%	July 30, 2013	#2
Sarah and Francis’ joyride takes an unexpected turn as they encounter a group of carjackers. To keep Francis away from further trouble, Carissa tells him that they will go back to America. However, Francis stands up for his decision to stay. Meanwhile, Sarah faces Marietta’s rage as her mother blames her for putting Francis’ life in danger.
18	18	"Episode 18"	Nuel C. Naval, Manny Q. Palo	Mariami Tanangco-Domingo	31.4%	July 31, 2013	#2
Blaming Francis for the conflict in his family, Leonel angrily punches Francis. To teach Leonel a lesson, Adelina presses charges against him. However, not long after withdrawing the case against Leonel, Adelina accuses Sarah of stealing her earrings and sends Sarah to prison as well. Adelina’s adamant refusal to free Sarah drives Bernardo to admit that Sarah is Carissa’s real child.
19	19	"Episode 19"	Nuel C. Naval, Manny Q. Palo	Mariami Tanangco-Domingo	31.2%	August 1, 2013	#2
To find out if Bernardo is telling the truth about Sarah's real mother, Edmund proceeds with Carissa and Francis’s DNA testing. The possibility of losing Francis, however, leaves Carissa and Adelina deeply perturbed. Meanwhile, Elvira and Marietta, in fear of Adelina's wrath, ask Bernardo to retract what he said about Francis and Sarah's being switched at birth. As the results of the DNA test reach Edmund's hands, Francis takes the chance to dance with Sarah at Nicolas's birthday party and bid her goodbye before he leaves for America.
20	20	"Episode 20"	Nuel C. Naval, Manny Q. Palo	Mariami Tanangco-Domingo	32.7%	August 2, 2013	#2
Nicolas’s birthday celebration gets an unexpected end as Bernardo reveals the truth behind Sarah’s and Francis’s identities. Bernardo takes responsibility for switching Sarah and Francis in order to spare Elvira and Marietta from the repercussions of their crime.
21	21	"Episode 21"	Nuel C. Naval, Manny Q. Palo	Mariami Tanangco-Domingo	30%	August 5, 2013	#3
Sarah has to choose between her real family and the family that she grew up with.
22	22	"Episode 22"	Nuel C. Naval, Manny Q. Palo	Mariami Tanangco-Domingo	29.4%	August 6, 2013	#3
Marietta constantly wants to intend against Carissa.
23	23	"Episode 23"	Nuel C. Naval, Manny Q. Palo	Mariami Tanangco-Domingo	29.9%	August 7, 2013	#2
Adelina agrees to withdraw her case against Bernardo on the condition that she and Carissa get custody of both Francis and Sarah. In response, Marietta offers Sarah to Carissa and Adelina, but only if the pair return Francis. While Sarah and Francis refuse to go back to their biological families, Carissa vows to win Sarah's trust by finding out what truly happened on the night Carissa and Marietta gave birth side by side.
24	24	"Episode 24"	Nuel C. Naval, Manny Q. Palo	Mariami Tanangco-Domingo	28.9%	August 8, 2013	#2
Carissa’s threats of revealing the truth behind Francis and Sarah’s switch push Marietta to surrender Sarah to Carissa and Adelina in exchange for Bernardo’s freedom. On her first night in her real family’s home, Sarah finds comfort in Francis as she longs for the family she grew up with especially Leonel.
25	25	"Episode 25"	Nuel C. Naval, Manny Q. Palo	Mariami Tanangco-Domingo	31.9%	August 9, 2013	#2
As Sarah adjusts to her new life, her biological family encourages her to focus on her studies and drop her obligations to her former family. Meanwhile, Marietta invites Francis to spend a few days with his biological family. Before Francis leaves for his short stay at Marietta's, he invites Sarah on a date where he tells her about his feelings for her.
26	26	"Episode 26"	Nuel C. Naval, Manny Q. Palo	Mariami Tanangco-Domingo	29.3%	August 12, 2013	#3
Despite Leonel’s initial indifference towards his younger brother, Francis takes the chance to bond with his biological family during his short vacation. Instead of worrying over Francis, Carissa and Adelina, decide to spend more time with Sarah. Convinced that Marietta is the culprit behind Francis and Sarah’s switch, Carissa hires an investigator to search for the midwife who had aided her and Marietta’s childbirths.
27	27	"Episode 27"	Nuel C. Naval, Manny Q. Palo	Mariami Tanangco-Domingo	30.5%	August 13, 2013	#3
Ignoring his chest pains, Francis makes the most of his short vacation at Marietta’s home by going out with Leonel, Pancho, and Natalia. Francis’s stay, however, brings no joy to Leonel, who feels burdened by the responsibility of taking care of his younger brother with the weak heart.
28	28	"Episode 28"	Nuel C. Naval, Manny Q. Palo	Mariami Tanangco-Domingo	30.2%	August 14, 2013	#3
Francis and Sarah’s short vacation at Marietta’s turns disastrous after Leonel hurts Francis. The situation worsens when Carissa comes to Marietta's house and sees Sarah in tears and Francis wounded.
29	29	"Episode 29"	Nuel C. Naval, Manny Q. Palo	Mariami Tanangco-Domingo	31.4%	August 15, 2013	#2
Francis and Sarah’s short vacation at Marietta’s turns disastrous after Leonel hurts Francis. The situation worsens when Carissa comes to Marietta's house and sees Sarah in tears and Francis wounded.
30	30	"Episode 30"	Nuel C. Naval, Manny Q. Palo	Mariami Tanangco-Domingo	30.3%	August 16, 2013	#2
Annoyed by their families’ worthless fight over their custodies, Francis and Sarah run away from home after Carissa and Marietta fail to talk it out peacefully. Annoyed by their families’ worthless fight over their custodies, Francis and Sarah run away from home after Carissa and Marietta fail to talk it out peacefully.
31	31	"Episode 31"	Nuel C. Naval, Manny Q. Palo, Don Cuaresma	Mariami Tanangco-Domingo	30.2%	August 19, 2013	#3
Marietta and Carissa finally come up with an agreement that would enable their respective families to spend quality time with Francis. Tension rises anew between Francis and Leonel as they live under one roof again. Sarah devotes her time to bonding with her biological family and acquainting herself with the family business. Preparing to attend Sarah’s formal introduction as a De la Vega, Francis suddenly suffers a sharp pain in his chest.
32	32	"Episode 32"	Nuel C. Naval, Manny Q. Palo	Mariami Tanangco-Domingo	25.8%	August 20, 2013	#3
As Sarah makes her debut in Manila society, a new feeling debuts in Leonel's heart. Francis's own heart continues to trouble him after he secretly learns that it may require another serious procedure. Meanwhile, Carissa maneuvers around her leftover feelings for Nicolas when Marietta brings him as her date to Sarah's debut. Unbeknownst to everyone, Marietta's former lover Ignacio is on his way back into their lives.
33	33	"Episode 33"	Nuel C. Naval, Manny Q. Palo	Mariami Tanangco-Domingo	26.0%	August 21, 2013	#3
At Sarah's debut, Ignacio becomes an unwelcome distraction from Francis's blossoming love for Sarah after the man reveals himself as Francis's real father. At Sarah's debut, Ignacio becomes an unwelcome distraction from Francis's blossoming love for Sarah after the man reveals himself as Francis's real father.
34	34	"Episode 34"	Nuel C. Naval, Manny Q. Palo	Mariami Tanangco-Domingo	28.3%	August 22, 2013	#3
While his family doubts the reason behind Ignacio’s return, Francis takes the chance to know his biological father. Francis also tells Sarah how he feels about her.
35	35	"Episode 35"	Nuel C. Naval, Manny Q. Palo	Mariami Tanangco-Domingo	29.9%	August 23, 2013	#3
Francis serenades Sarah as he finally proposes to her. Sarah admits to Francis that he also likes him but asks him to take things slow. Leonel confronts Francis upon learning of his courtship of Sarah and secretly swears to keep his younger brother from being with Sarah.

=== Season 2 ===
No. overall	No. in season	Title	Directed by	Written by	Ratings	Original release date	Nightly rank
36	1	"Episode 36"	Nuel C. Naval, Manny Q. Palo	Mariami Tanangco-Domingo	20.4%	August 26, 2013	#6
Upon confirming Sarah's decision to accept Francis as her suitor, Leonel tries to talk her out of it but holds back from revealing his own feelings for Sarah. Francis, on the other hand, defends Sarah from Marietta's ill treatment and professes his love for her. Sarah also confesses her feelings for Francis and finally agrees to commit in a relationship with him.
37	2	"Episode 37"	Nuel C. Naval, Manny Q. Palo	Mariami Tanangco-Domingo	22.9%	August 27, 2013	#4
Leonel’s meddling in his relationship with Sarah drives Francis to battle his sibling in a basketball game. This, however, takes its toll on Francis’s frail heart. Meanwhile, Sarah admits her relationship with Francis to Carissa who promptly tells her to end their growing romance, fearing that it might affect Francis’s heart condition.
38	3	"Episode 38"	Nuel C. Naval, Manny Q. Palo	Mariami Tanangco-Domingo	22.0%	August 28, 2013	#4
Francis must undergo another heart surgery. Carissa offers to help, but Marietta refuses and continues to keep Carissa away from the boy. Worried for the child she helped raise, Carissa thinks of another way to help: She asks Sarah to end her relationship with Francis in order to save his heart.
39	4	"Episode 39"	Nuel C. Naval, Manny Q. Palo	Mariami Tanangco-Domingo	20.2%	August 29, 2013	#5
Carissa must choose between letting Francis fall deeper in love with Sarah or saving his heart from more pain. Meanwhile, Ignacio takes credit for paying for Francis's medical bills as he secretly serves as the bridge for Edmund and Carissa's money.
40	5	"Episode 40"	Nuel C. Naval, Manny Q. Palo	Mariami Tanangco-Domingo	22.8%	August 30, 2013	#4
Despite both Marietta and Carissa’s desire to end Francis and Sarah’s relationship, Francis stands more resolute to fight for his love for the young lady. Leonel, on the other hand, bears the pain of learning about Sarah’s relationship with Francis. Seeking Ignacio’s help, Marietta succeeds to keep Francis from attending his joint birthday celebration with Sarah.
41	6	"Episode 41"	Nuel C. Naval, Manny Q. Palo	Mariami Tanangco-Domingo	23.8%	September 2, 2013	#4
Francis gives in to Marietta's insistence to celebrate his birthday with his biological family at their home, contrary to their original plan of having a joint celebration with Sarah and her family. Leonel, on the other hand, chooses to celebrate with Sarah and surprises her with his arrival at her party. Leonel later meets his boss for the first time and discovers the real nature of his job. Meanwhile, Francis promises Sarah that he will survive his upcoming operation for her sake.
42	7	"Episode 42"	Nuel C. Naval, Manny Q. Palo	Mariami Tanangco-Domingo	22.3%	September 3, 2013	#4
Edmund, Carissa, and Adelina learn of Ignacio's anomalous transactions and soon find themselves regretting their decision to use him in extending their financial help for Francis. Setting her eyes on ensuring her son's welfare, Marietta lays a guilt trip on Sarah to convince her to end her relationship with Francis. Meanwhile, Leonel impresses his boss Anton when he escapes the authorities with his clever tactics.
43	8	"Episode 43"	Nuel C. Naval, Manny Q. Palo	Mariami Tanangco-Domingo	19.2%	September 4, 2013	#6
When Francis suffers another health relapse, Marietta is pushed over the edge and ends up hurting Sarah as she blames the latter for the mishap. Upon discovering what Marietta did to Sarah, Carissa and Nicolas come up with their own ways to protect their daughter from Marietta. Considering the grave repercussions if she continues her relationship with Francis, Sarah faces a dilemma of choosing between fighting for her love for Francis or giving it up to avoid further conflicts.
44	9	"Episode 44"	Nuel C. Naval, Manny Q. Palo	Mariami Tanangco-Domingo	21.6%	September 5, 2013	#5
Francis stages a heart attack just to get the attention of the elusive Sarah. When Sarah learns of Francis' pretense, she walks out, but Francis gets a hold of her and motions to kiss her.Stopping the two just in time, Carissa reprimands Sarah, unaware that Francis is eavesdropping on them. Meanwhile, Leonel sees for himself how dangerous Anton's syndicate operations can be.
45	10	"Episode 45"	Nuel C. Naval, Manny Q. Palo	Mariami Tanangco-Domingo	19.8%	September 6, 2013	#8
Despite his desire to fight for his love for Sarah, Francis decides to free her from all the pain brought by their condemned relationship by leaving the Beltran mansion and going back to his biological family. Despite his desire to fight for his love for Sarah, Francis decides to free her from all the pain brought by their condemned relationship by leaving the Beltran mansion and going back to his biological family. With the sudden turn of events, Leonel seizes the perfect opportunity to seek Sarah's attention. As Leonel's life continues to prosper due to his shady job, his boss Anton finds a way to get closer to the Beltrans by using an unsuspecting Sarah in his vile plans.
46	11	"Episode 46"	Nuel C. Naval, Manny Q. Palo	Mariami Tanangco-Domingo	21.1%	September 9, 2013	#6
Carissa turns a deaf ear to Marietta and Elvira's pleas to grant Bernardo's share on the plantation's income. This, however, pushes Bernardo to leave his wife. As the clash between Carissa and Marietta intensifies, a deceitful Nicolas secretly works with Anton in fulfilling their act of retribution against Adelina. Meanwhile, Leonel finally finds the chance to tell Sarah how he feels about her.
47	12	"Episode 47"	Nuel C. Naval, Manny Q. Palo	Mariami Tanangco-Domingo	19.0%	September 10, 2013	#7
The right time has come for Carissa to get even with Marietta as she finally succeeds in putting the latter to jail for switching their respective child. However, Marietta prevents her father from doing so, knowing that Carissa would not yield to their pleas. Meanwhile, a heated confrontation that took place between Leonel and Francis paves the way for Sarah to discover the former's special feelings for her.
48	13	"Episode 48"	Nuel C. Naval, Manny Q. Palo	Mariami Tanangco-Domingo	19.5%	September 11, 2013	#7
To spare Marietta from being jailed, Elvira takes the blame of switching Francis and Sarah at birth. While Patron continues to lend him a helping hand, Leonel finally confesses his true feelings for Sarah.
49	14	"Episode 49"	Nuel C. Naval, Manny Q. Palo	Mariami Tanangco-Domingo	21.0%	September 12, 2013	#7
Appalled by Leonel’s revelation, Sarah walks out on him. Lavida soon finds Leonel in Adelina’s room, and despite his insistence that he needs to talk with Sarah, Lavida drives him out. Shortly after, Adelina comes home only to find her vault open and empty. While Leonel gets accused of stealing Adelina's money, Ignacio hands a man thousands of pesos.
50	15	"Episode 50"	Nuel C. Naval, Manny Q. Palo	Mariami Tanangco-Domingo	21.6%	September 13, 2013	#6
Taking it upon himself to protect his lovechild with Marietta, Anton vows to take matters into his own hands once his enemies hurt Leonel. Meanwhile, Carissa becomes worried for both Francis and Sarah when Carissa learns that Leonel is making a move to win her daughter's heart.
51	16	"Episode 51"	Nuel C. Naval, Manny Q. Palo	Mariami Tanangco-Domingo	17.2%	September 16, 2013	#8
Ignacio gets caught by the other members of the syndicate spying on Leonel, although Leonel takes it upon himself to spare Ignacio's life – in one condition. Seizing the perfect opportunity to learn more about Leonel's mysterious job, Francis arrives at his brother's new living space and soon finds himself running for dear life as Leonel chases after him.
52	17	"Episode 52"	Nuel C. Naval, Manny Q. Palo	Mariami Tanangco-Domingo	20.6%	September 17, 2013	#6
Marietta becomes desperate to help her mother and even kneels before Carissa in hopes of convincing the latter to withdraw her case against Elvira. Meanwhile, Leonel's request for another chance falls on deaf ears as Sarah continues to reject his love. While Leonel grieves over his heartbreak, an unexpected reunion takes place between Marietta and Anton.
53	18	"Episode 53"	Nuel C. Naval, Manny Q. Palo	Mariami Tanangco-Domingo	19.4%	September 18, 2013	#8
Leonel struggles to deal with the fact that his boss Anton is his father who abandoned him and Marietta 20 years ago. Still hurt by Anton's worthlessness as a father, Marietta refuses to make amends with him.
54	19	"Episode 54"	Nuel C. Naval, Manny Q. Palo	Mariami Tanangco-Domingo	20.1%	September 19, 2013	#8
Anton finds the perfect time to sabotage Adelina’s coconut business when Nicolas informs him of the factory’s upcoming exportation to Spain. They get into talking about coconut businesses in Batangas, and despite Anton’s denials, Adelina gets the hunch that she knows Anton from long ago. Meanwhile, Francis and Sarah look forward to the day when they can get married. Elsewhere, Marietta makes Leonel choose between her and Anton.
55	20	"Episode 55"	Nuel C. Naval, Manny Q. Palo	Mariami Tanangco-Domingo	19.3%	September 20, 2013	#8
Adelina starts to experience the wrath of an enemy when her product exportation to Spain turns into a disaster. Meanwhile, Francis shows up at Leonel's condo in hopes of convincing his brother to return to Marietta.
56	21	"Episode 56"	Nuel C. Naval, Manny Q. Palo	Mariami Tanangco-Domingo	18.3%	September 23, 2013	#7
The ghost of her past keeps haunting Carissa as she discerns that her feelings for Nicolas, once laying dormant, is rekindled. Meanwhile, Francis gets to spend some time alone with Sarah when they find themselves stuck inside the fire exit of Leonel's condo, leaving their respective families worried for their welfare.
57	22	"Episode 57"	Nuel C. Naval, Manny Q. Palo	Mariami Tanangco-Domingo	19.1%	September 24, 2013	#7
After discovering that Francis and Sarah have spent the night together, Leonel flies into a rage and ends up beating his brother. In his attempt to end things with Natalia, Leonel inadvertently hurts the latter when he confesses that he loves Sarah. Meanwhile, Carissa faces a dilemma of choosing between her family and Nicolas when the latter asks her to run away with him.
58	23	"Episode 58"	Nuel C. Naval, Manny Q. Palo	Mariami Tanangco-Domingo	19.0%	September 25, 2013	#6
Carissa decides to do the right thing by turning down Nicolas's offer to run away with him. While struggling to accept Carissa's decision, Nicolas deems it the right time to put his foot down and stop Anton from continuing his quest for revenge against Adelina. However, Anton remains resolute in retaliating, prompting Nicolas to renounce his membership in the syndicate.
59	24	"Episode 59"	Nuel C. Naval, Manny Q. Palo	Mariami Tanangco-Domingo	N/A	September 26, 2013	N/A
Carissa is dealt with a devastating blow when she finds out Nicolas is the one behind the contamination of A. Beltran Incorporated's products. To save the company from utter ruin, Carissa holds a press conference to quell the anxieties of the company's investors. Meanwhile, Anton plots an assassination to keep his group's illegal activities from being exposed.
60	25	"Episode 60"	Nuel C. Naval, Manny Q. Palo	Mariami Tanangco-Domingo	19.6%	September 27, 2013	#6
Anton’s plot to kill Carissa costs him Nicolas’s life. Meanwhile, Sarah learns from Francis that Ignacio has a possible connection to the incident. When Ignacio denies that he knows anything about the identity of the assailant, Sarah sets off to search for the truth on her own.
61	26	"Episode 61"	Nuel C. Naval, Manny Q. Palo	Mariami Tanangco-Domingo	21.9%	September 30, 2013	#5
Following Nicolas’s death, the Beltrans and the Dela Vegas learn that Francis and Sarah are held captive by Anton. Despite Sarah’s dissuasion, Leonel is enraged upon learning Sarah’s true feelings for him and decides to kill Francis himself. Meanwhile, both Adelina and Carissa choose to yield to Anton’s request of giving themselves in in exchange for Sarah and Francis’s freedom.
62	27	"Episode 62"	Nuel C. Naval, Manny Q. Palo	Mariami Tanangco-Domingo	22.1%	October 1, 2013	#5
After Ignacio manages to escape death, Leonel succeeds to make everyone believe that he has killed Francis. While Leonel and Francis together attempt to save Sarah, Anton arrives in the warehouse, holding Adelina and Carissa captive. There, Adelina finally learns the real identity of her and her family’s abductor.
63	28	"Episode 63"	Nuel C. Naval, Manny Q. Palo	Mariami Tanangco-Domingo	23.4%	October 2, 2013	#5
64	29	"Episode 64"	Nuel C. Naval, Manny Q. Palo	Mariami Tanangco-Domingo	24.0%	October 3, 2013	#5
Adelina and her family escape Anton’s vengeful act. The incident, however, takes its toll on Francis’s frail heart, putting the Beltrans and the Dela Vegas in another quandary as Francis needs to undergo a heart transplant. Despite his relief in learning that Sarah is alive, Leonel, on the other hand, faces the consequences of his actions as the police begin the hunt for him and Anton.
65	30	"Episode 65"	Nuel C. Naval, Manny Q. Palo	Mariami Tanangco-Domingo	25.7%	October 4, 2013	#5
As Francis remains ill in the hospital, Nicolas is brought to his final resting place. Meanwhile, Marietta asks forgiveness from Sarah, while Adelina patches up with Elvira. Planning to leave the country, Leonel secretly visits his sick brother. However, cops spot Leonel, causing him to flee with Sarah in a tense car chase that will soon alter their lives. Carissa and Marietta comfort each other as their children are all in critical conditions. Before begging forgiveness from her best friend, Marietta admits that she was responsible for switching their babies. Later, Leonel wakes up briefly but soon dies, while Francis and Sarah's vital signs deteriorate. Sarah and Francis visit Leonel's grave and express their gratitude for everything he has done for them. They soon exchange marriage vows in front of their loving families.
