= Honor Thy Mother (TV series) =

Philippine family drama television series

- Genre: Family drama Thriller
- Directed by: Onat Diaz; Dolly Dulu
- Starring: Sharon Cuneta; Barbie Forteza; John Estrada; Khalil Ramos
- Country of origin: Philippines
- Original language: Filipino
- No. of episodes: 14

Production
- Camera setup: Single-camera
- Running time: 57–60 minutes
- Production companies: ABS-CBN Studios; Dreamscape Entertainment; GMA Pictures

Original release
- Network: Amazon Prime Video
- Release: September 11 (Note: It was released in the United States on September 10, 2026.) – October 23, 2026

Honor Thy Mother is a Philippine family drama television series directed by Onat Diaz and Dolly Dulu. It stars Sharon Cuneta and Barbie Forteza.

== Premise ==
Diana Aragon, a powerful CEO, and Patricia, her estranged daughter, are forced to reconcile and work together after becoming entangled in a deadly corporate conspiracy.

== Cast and characters ==
=== Main cast ===
- Sharon Cuneta as Diana Aragon
  - Krystal Mejes as young Diana
- Barbie Forteza as Patricia Monique Aragon Dela Cruz
- John Estrada as Ricardo Salvador/Pineda
- Khalil Ramos as Lorenzo de Leon

=== Supporting cast ===
- RK Bagatsing as Teddy Aragon
- Criza Taa as Georgia Aragon
- Tonton Gutierrez as Martin Dela Cruz
- Mercedes Cabral as Carlota Cervantes
- Bodjie Pascua
- Marvin Yap as Benjie Martinez
- Lui Manansala as Yaya Cora
- Amy Nobleza as Jena Dela Cruz
- Avery Luna as April Dela Cruz
- PJ Endrinal as Oliver Cortez

=== Guest cast ===
- Tirso Cruz III as Don Lucio Aragon
- Boy Abunda as a host
- Lito Camo as a director
- Sandy Aloba as a production crew
- Daniela Stranner as an actor
- Bianca de Vera as an actor
- Simon Ibarra as a doctor
- Kaori Oinuma as an actor
- Giovanni Baldisseri as Victor
- Dingdong Bahan as Harvey

== Episodes ==
No.	Title	Original release date
1	"Twist of Fate"	September 11, 2026
2	"Old Wounds"	September 11, 2026
3	"Defiance"	September 18, 2026
4	"Danger"	September 18, 2026
5	"Reputation"	September 25, 2026
6	"Scandal"	September 25, 2026
7	"Warning"	October 2, 2026
8	"Rekindle"	October 2, 2026
9	"Truth"	October 9, 2026
10	"Wedge"	October 9, 2026
11	"Trap"	October 16, 2026
12	"Opportunity"	October 16, 2026
13	"Deception"	October 23, 2026
14	"Reckoning"	October 23, 2026

== Production ==
=== Development and casting ===
The series was announced during the Prime Video Presents campaign and will be the third collaboration of ABS-CBN and GMA Network. The cast announced for the series were Sharon Cuneta, Barbie Forteza, John Estrada, and Khalil Ramos. Additional cast were Tonton Gutierrez, Mercedes Cabral, and RK Bagatsing. On May 8, 2026, it was announced that Onat Diaz and Dolly Dulu will direct the series.

== Release ==
The first two episodes released on Amazon Prime Video on September 11, 2026. The series consists of 14 episodes. The series will release on GMA Network on free TV soon.
