= RK Bagatsing =

Filipino actor (born 1988)

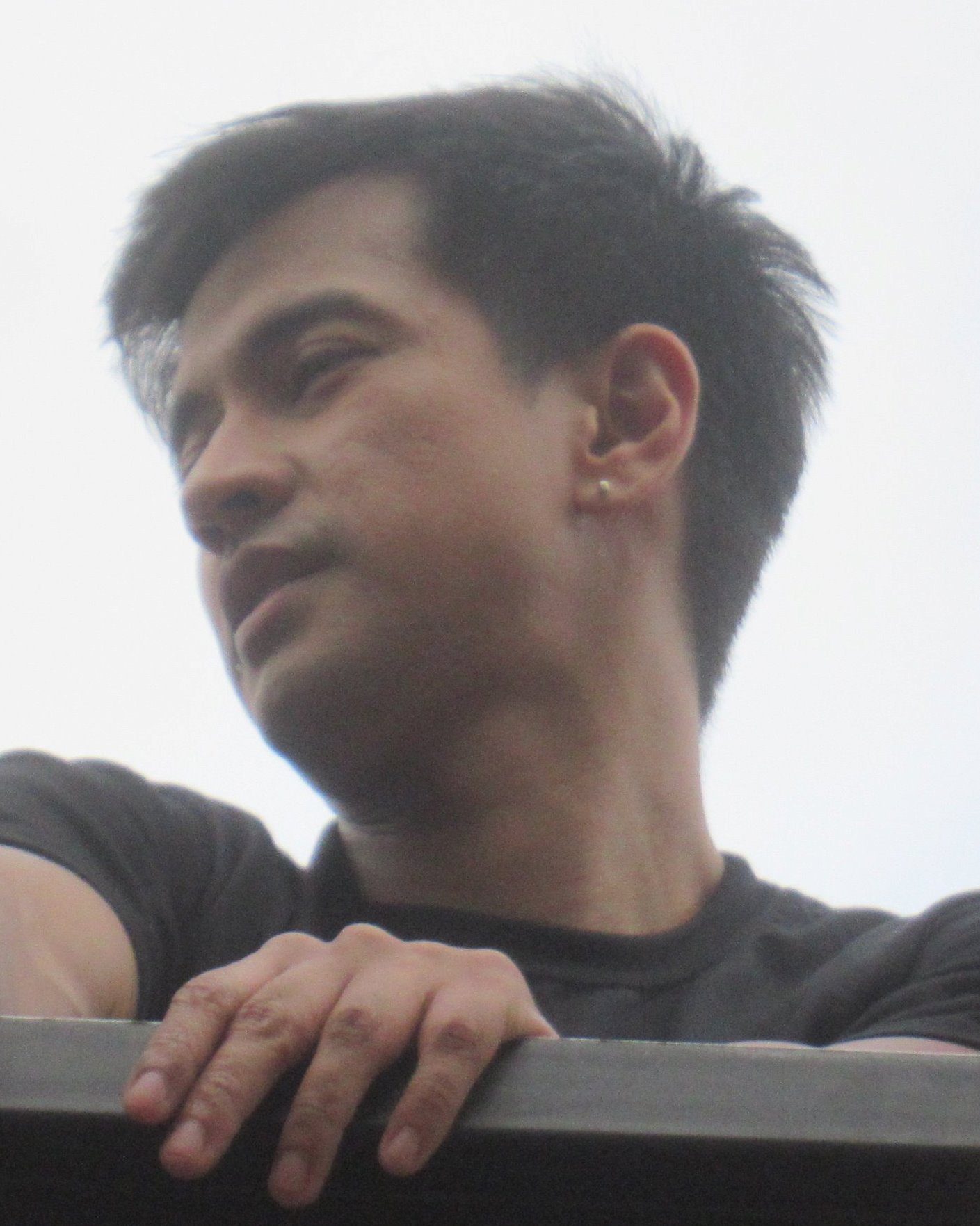
- Born: Ramon Khino San Diego Bagatsing; May 9, 1988 (age 38); Tondo, Manila, Philippines
- Other names: Arnaldo, Khino, Mackie, Mr. Mayor, RK, Greg, Johnny
- Occupation: Actor
- Years active: 2009–present
- Agents: Star Magic (2016–present); Regal Entertainment (2020–present)
- Notable work: Wildflower; FPJ's Batang Quiapo; Sins of the Father
- Height: 1.72 m (5 ft 8 in)
- Partner: Jane Oineza (2021–present)
- Family: Ramon Bagatsing (grandfather); Raymond Bagatsing (brother)
- Website: RK Bagatsing on Instagram

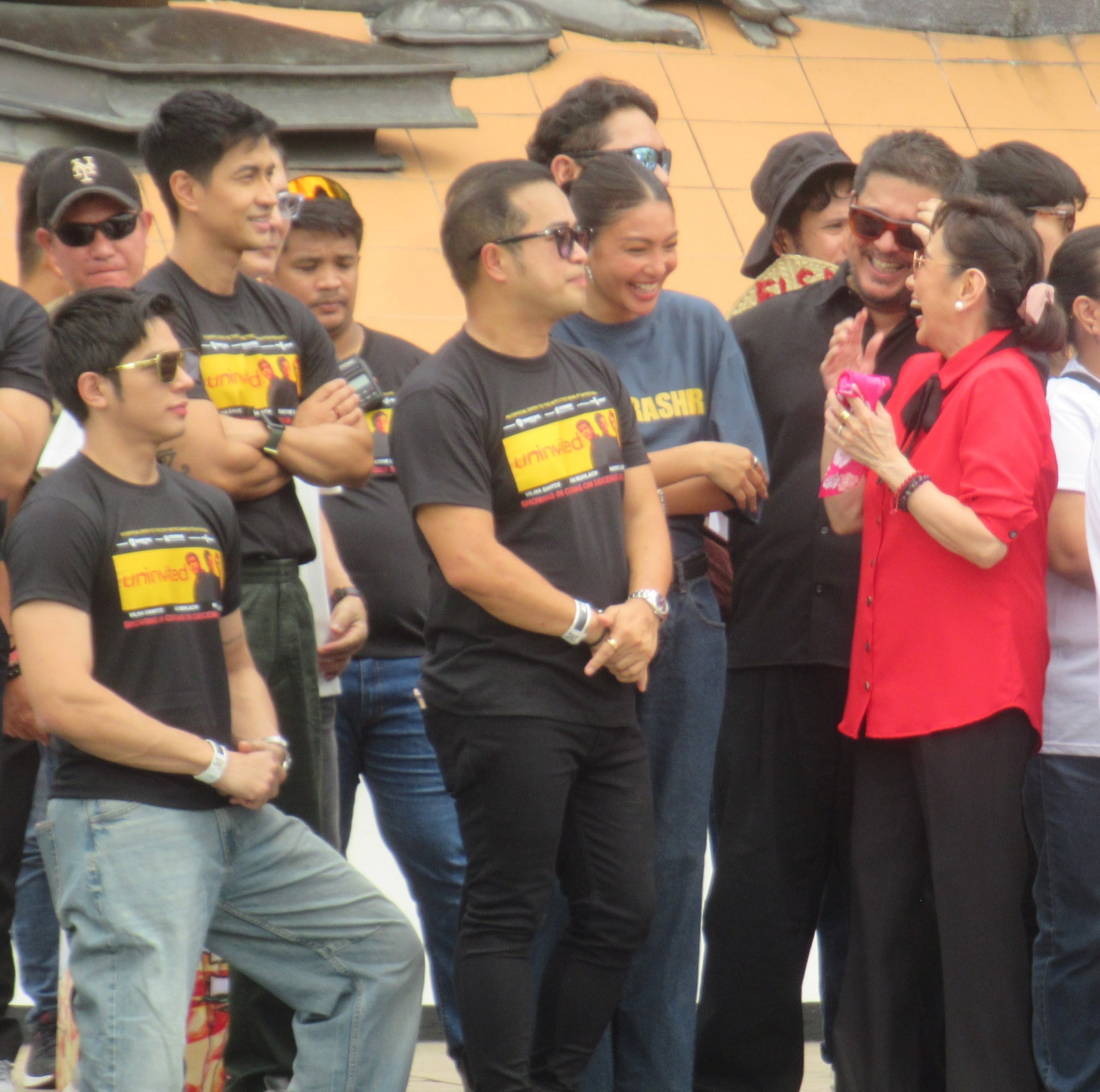
Bagatsing (Uninvited cast)

Ramon Khino San Diego Bagatsing (Tagalog pronunciation: [ɔŋ ˈaɾ.keɪ bɐˈɡat.sɪŋ/]; born May 9, 1988) is a Filipino film and television actor. He is most notable for the role of Arnaldo Ardiente Torillo in the ABS-CBN series Wildflower.

He is currently under the management of Star Magic.

== Early life and education ==
Bagatsing is the son of actor Ramon "Boy" Bagatsing, Jr. and Marilou San Diego of Santa Rosa, Nueva Ecija. He is the younger brother of actor Raymond Bagatsing and actress Monina Bagatsing. Bagatsing's paternal grandfather is the former Manila City Mayor Ramon Bagatsing, the city's longest-serving mayor. He played basketball for Saint Francis of Assisi College during his elementary days.

== Career ==
Bagatsing has been nominated for acting awards for his roles in Apocalypse Child and Slumber Party. Outside his filming roles, he has also dabbled in television appearing in episodes of Wagas and Ipaglaban Mo!.

In 2017, he played the trending Primetime TV series Wildflower as Mayor Arnaldo Ardiente Torillo; with actress Maja Salvador and in 2018, he was part of ABS-CBN's initial drama offering and Afternoon TV Series Araw Gabi, with JM de Guzman.

In the 2025, Philippine action-drama series Sins of the Father as PO2 Johnny Policarpio, an intense, intimidating police officer.

In the 2026, family drama series collaboration Honor thy Mother with Sharon Cuneta, Barbie Forteza, John Estrada, and Khalil Ramos. and in Haunted Carnival an official horror entry for the 2026 Metro Manila Film Festival (MMFF). He acts alongside a powerhouse cast including Maricel Soriano, John Arcilla, Julia Barretto, and James Reid.

== Other ventures ==
=== Fitness and Wellness ===
Bagatsing he is a certified yoga teacher, integrating mindfulness and flexibility training into his routine. He actively trains in martial arts, utilizing it for physical fitness and discipline.

== Personal life ==
Bagatsing currently in a high-profile relationship with actress Jane Oineza. The couple, often called "RKane" by fans, officially confirmed their romance in May 2021.

== Filmography ==
=== Film ===
Year	Title	Role	Ref.
2009	Chronicle of Wasted Lives	Jason	
2012	Slumber Party	Philip "Phil"	
2013	The Guerilla is a Poet		
2013	Sitio		
2014	K'na the Dreamweaver	Silaw	
2014	Violator	Gabriel Ragas	
2015	Swap	Agent Ramirez	
2015	The Hut by the Bamboo Grove	Larry	
2015	Apocalypse Child	Rich	
2016	Expressway	Young Ben	
2016	Love Me Tomorrow	DJ Kiks	
2017	Gandarrapido: The Revenger Squad	Renz / Madman	
2018	Kasal	Michelle's fiancé	
2018	Goyo: Ang Batang Heneral	Dr. Simeon Villa	
2019	Iska	Osler	
2019	Cuddle Weather	Ram	
2020	Us Again	Mike	
2021	Love or Money	Angel's ex-boyfriend	
2023	Kahit Maputi Na ang Buhok Ko	Rey Valera	
2023	Swing	Kevin	
2023	Shake, Rattle & Roll Extreme	Lionel	
2024	Love Child	Paolo	
2024	Uninvited	Jigger Zulueta	
2025	Fleeting	JC	
2025	Sana Sinabi Mo	Marlon	
2025	Near Death	Lucas	
2026	Ganito, Ganyan, Ganoon,	Doc Migs	
2026	Haunted Carnival †		

=== Television ===
Year	Title	Role	Ref.
2013–2014	Point of Entry	Anton	
2014	Wagas: A Transgender's Love - Giggle & Jay Love Story	Sassi Giggle	
2015	The Half Sisters	Warren	
2016	Ipaglaban Mo: Bintang	Kenneth	
2016	Ipaglaban Mo: Kapansanan	Baldo	
2016	Be My Lady	Macario "Mackie" Crisostomo	
2017	Ipaglaban Mo: Paso	Jess	
2017	Wildflower	Mayor Arnaldo Ardiente-Torillo†	
2018	Maalala Mo Kaya: Surfboard	Harry Marzan	
2018	Ipaglaban Mo: Korea	Alvin	
2018	Precious Hearts Romances Presents: Araw Gabi	David Garcia†	
2018	Maalaala Mo Kaya: Teddy Bear	Rey	
2018–2023; 2025–present	ASAP	Himself – Performer / co-host	
2019	Nang Ngumiti ang Langit	Michael Villaluna	
2020	Maalaala Mo Kaya: Tattoo	Totie Casimiro	
2020	I Got You	Louie	
2021	Huwag Kang Mangamba	Mayor Miguel Advincula	
2021	ABS-CBN Christmas Special 2021: Andito Tayo Para Sa Isa't Isa	Himself / Performer	
2022	The Goodbye Girl	Y	
2022	Oh My Korona!	Tim	
2022	Maalaala Mo Kaya: Medalyon	Billy	
2022	ABS-CBN Christmas Special 2022: Tayo Ang Ligaya Ng Isa't Isa	Himself / Performer	
2022	K-Love	Calvin	
2023	FPJ's Batang Quiapo	Greg Zialcita-Valderama†	
2023	Dirty Linen	Don Christopher "Chris" Fiero	
2025	Rainbow Rumble	Himself / Contestant	
2025	It's Showtime	Himself / Guest with Jessy Mendiola	
2025	Sins of the Father	PO2 Johnny Policarpio	
2025	Eat Bulaga!	Himself / guest co-host	
2025	TV Patrol: Express	Himself / Star Patroller	
2025	ABS-CBN Christmas Special 2025: "Love, Joy, Hope"	Himself / performer	
2025–2026	Call My Manager!	Gabriel Soler	
2026	Family Feud	Himself / Contestant	
2026	Fast Talk with Boy Abunda	Himself / Guest	
2026	Honor Thy Mother †	Teddy Aragon	

=== Microdrama ===
Year	Title	Role	Ref.
2026	The Perfect Wife		

== Accolades ==
Award	Year	Category	Nominated work	Result	Ref.
CinePanalo Festival	2025	Panalong Aktor (Best Actor)	Fleeting	Nominated	
16th Gawad Tanglaw Awards	2018	Best Actor in a Drama Series	Wildflower	Won	
6th Platinum Stallion Media Awards	2018	Best Supporting Actor	Wildflower	Won	
Box Office Entertainment Awards	2018	Best Actor	Wildflower	Won	
Gawad Urian Awards	2016	Best Supporting Actor (Pinakamahusay na Pangalawang Aktor)	Apocalypse Child	Nominated	
Golden Screen Awards	2013	Breakthrough Performance by an Actor	Slumber Party	Nominated	
Luna Award	2016	Best Supporting Actor	Apocalypse Child	Nominated	
PMPC Star Awards for Movies	2013	New Movie Actor of the Year	Slumber Party	Nominated	
