= Jane Oineza =

Filipino actress, model and singer (born 1996)

- Born: Elizabeth Jane Urbano Oineza; July 22, 1996 (age 30); Bani, Pangasinan, Philippines
- Occupations: Actress; model; singer
- Years active: 2001–present
- Agent: Star Magic
- Relatives: Noemi Oineza (sister)

Elizabeth Jane Urbano Oineza (born July 22, 1996) is a Filipino actress. She began her career at age five, debuting in the romantic drama Sa Dulo ng Walang Hanggan (2001). A pioneer member of the variety show Goin' Bulilit (2005–2008), she has since appeared in various films and television shows. Her acting garnered nominations for a Golden Screen Award, a Seoul International Drama Award, a New York Festivals Award, and a PMPC Star Award for Television Award.

== Early life and background ==
Elizabeth Jane Urbano Oineza was born in the town of Bani, Pangasinan to Erwin Oineza, a businessman in Metro Manila, and his wife Jennifer Urbano. The oldest among three siblings, she lived with her family throughout the Ilocos region. Oineza is fluent in Tagalog and English, with some proficiency in Ilokano. She is of mostly Pangasinan and Ilocano ancestry. She is also Roman Catholic.

Scouted to join the entertainment industry at an early age, Oineza's first appearances on television began as a child model in over twenty TV commercials for various product brands.

From then on, Oineza became her family's sole breadwinner after her parents resigned from their respective jobs to assist her in her career. The family moved from the provinces to live in Pasig and then later in Quezon City.

== Acting career ==
=== 2001–2012: Early career ===
Immediately after a popular shampoo ad was released, a talent manager urged Oineza to venture into acting. She made her acting debut at the age of 5 in the primetime teleserye Sa Dulo ng Walang Hanggan (2001–2003). She then portrayed a child version of a female protagonist in Sana'y Wala Nang Wakas (2003–2004) and Marina (2004) respectively. She soon came to prominence by joining the children's sketch comedy gag show Goin' Bulilit in various skits and parody roles. After graduating from Goin' Bulilit for three years, she was cast in the live-action fantasy series Kung Fu Kids (2008) as one of seven kids holding different personalities to be united by a prophecy. Kung Fu Kids earned a 37.1% national viewer rating according to NUTAM in the Philippines.

Since then, Oineza became a staple for local soap operas, appearing in supporting and guest roles in Ligaw na Bulaklak (2008), Maria la del Barrio (2011), Oka Tokat (2012). In several episodes of the drama anthologies Maalaala Mo Kaya and Wansapanataym. In the midst of drama portrayals, she obtained more challenging roles. Oineza materialized on the big screen with her first indie short in Sampalataya for Philippine's 2009 Urban Mediamakers Film Festival Entry, playing the role of a blind girl who dreams in colors but sees everything in black and white. She returned to co-starring in Star Cinema-produced mainstream movies, namely Miss You Like Crazy (2010), I Do (2010), and Amorosa (2012). She also participated in the period indie, Bayaning Pepe, a film under the direction of Carlos Morales, encompassing a story traced back into the younger years of National Hero Jose Rizal. She received rave reviews from independent film critics as she played the infamous Leonor Rivera, Rizal's "lover by correspondence".

=== 2013–2017: International recognition and breakthrough ===
In 2013, Oineza gained international recognition for her performance in the drama anthology Maalaala Mo Kaya for the episode "Manika" (lit. Doll) aired in 2012. She earned a Finalist Certificate for Best Performance by an Actress at the New York Festivals, a nomination for Outstanding Performance by an Actress in a Single Drama at the Golden Screen TV Awards, and a Best Drama nomination at the International Emmy Awards. Oineza played the role Nene, a girl raped by her stepfather, witnesses her mother succumb to drug addiction and escapes to a convent. The "Manika" episode broke barriers as one of the most-talked about episodes in the Maalaala Mo Kaya anthology, reaching a 40% national viewer rating via Kantar Media/TNS.

Oineza was relaunched as part of Star Magic 2013. She was cast in a minor supporting role in Muling Buksan ang Puso and a guest role in Juan dela Cruz. Separately, she appeared in another Maalaala Mo Kaya episode "Bimpo" where she played a young woman born with cerebral palsy. Her portrayal garnered her a second nomination for Best Single Performance by an Actress at the 27th PMPC Star Awards for Television.

In 2014, Oineza joined Pinoy Big Brother: All In as a celebrity housemate (contestant). She gained mixed attentions and viewer relevance because of her love-lines and strong personality. After spending 120 days in the competition, she finished in third place.

In 2015, she had her first lead role in the afternoon teleserye Nasaan Ka Nang Kailangan Kita, playing the role of Corrine, a determined daughter who desired to fix her broken family.

Oineza was also featured in Sponge Cola's single "Move On", released locally and worldwide via iTunes. She then starred in several movies including The Love Affair (2015), Always Be My Maybe (2016), Bloody Crayons (2017), and Haunted Forest (2017).

=== 2018–present: Shift to lead roles ===
In 2018, Oineza played an antagonistic role in the afternoon teleserye Araw Gabi. She then appeared in Los Bastardos, and also starred in the 2019 films Finding You and Ang Henerasyong Sumuko Sa Love.

Despite the ABS-CBN shutdown and the COVID-19 pandemic crisis, Oineza starred in two teleserye projects for TV5: I Got You (2020) and Gen Z (2021). She then returned to ABS-CBN for the 2021 teleserye The Broken Marriage Vow. In 2023, she led the cast of the afternoon drama series Nag-aapoy na Damdamin.

== Personal life ==
Oineza previously dated basketball player Jeron Teng. She confirmed her relationship with Teng upon admitting their break-up in an episode of Kris TV in 2016.

She is currently in a relationship with actor and onscreen partner RK Bagatsing. They first worked together in the 2018 TV series Araw Gabi. The couple officially confirmed their relationship in May 2021.

== Acting credits ==
=== Film ===
Key
| † | Denotes films that have not yet been released |

Jane Oineza's film credits with year of release, film titles and roles
| Year | Title | Role | Ref. |
|---|---|---|---|
| 2002 | Bakit Papa? | Blossom | |
| 2003 | Lastikman | young Donna | |
| 2007 | Bahay Kubo: A Pinoy Mano Po! | young Rose | |
| 2007 | Supahpapalicious | special guest | |
| 2009 | Sampalataya | Mayumi | |
| 2010 | Miss You like Crazy | Karen Samonte | |
| 2010 | I Do | Awit | |
| 2010 | Ang Tanging Pamilya | Young Charlie | |
| 2012 | Amorosa | Amanda | |
| 2012 | 24/7 in Love | Daniella "Bambi" | |
| 2015 | #WalangForever | cameo | |
| 2015 | The Love Affair | Cassie Ramos | |
| 2016 | Always Be My Maybe | Telay | |
| 2017 | Bloody Crayons | Olivia Mendez | |
| 2017 | Haunted Forest | Nica | |
| 2019 | Finding You | Kit | |
| 2019 | Ang Henerasyong Sumuko Sa Love | Maan | |
| 2019 | Tayo Muna Habang Hindi Pa Tayo | Alex | |
| 2020 | Us Again | Margie | |
| 2023 | Swing | Pam | |
| 2023 | Shake, Rattle & Roll Extreme | Vee | |
| 2024 | You're Mine | Vee | |
| 2024 | Fruitcake | Freya | |
| 2024 | Love Child | Ayla | |
| 2026 | Midnight Girls | Socorro "Saki" Castillo Pajarillga | |

=== Television ===
Key
| † | Denotes shows that have not yet been aired |

Jane Oineza's television credits with year of release, title(s) and role
| Year | Title | Role | Ref. |
|---|---|---|---|
| 2001–2002 | Hershey's Kidz Town | Herself | |
| 2001 | Sa Dulo ng Walang Hanggan | Arabella Crisostomo | |
| 2002–2005 | Bida si Mister, Bida si Misis | Rocky | |
| 2003 | Sana'y Wala Nang Wakas | young Arabella Grace Garcia | |
| 2003 | Maalaala Mo Kaya: Unan (The Julie Vega Story) | young Julie Vega | |
| 2004 | Marina | young Kristina / Marina | |
| 2004 | Maalaala Mo Kaya: Poste | young Shaina | |
| 2005 | Mga Anghel na Walang Langit | Pepay's friend | |
| 2005–2008 | Goin' Bulilit | Herself (various roles) | |
| 2005 | Wansapanataym | Susie | |
| 2007 | Prinsesa ng Banyera | young Maningning Burgos | |
| 2007 | Maalaala Mo Kaya: Telebisyon | young Onay | |
| 2008 | Kung Fu Kids | Moira "Moi" Ocampo | |
| 2008 | Ligaw na Bulaklak | Lilette | |
| 2008 | Maalaala Mo Kaya: Medyas | Jerelyn | |
| 2009 | Maalaala Mo Kaya: Bola (The Vice Ganda Story) | Jamie | |
| 2009 | Maalaala Mo Kaya: Relo | Apple | |
| 2009 | Katorse | young Elena "Nene" Reyes | |
| 2010 | Magkano ang Iyong Dangal? | young Alona Sandoval | |
| 2010 | Maalaala Mo Kaya: Bahay | Nicole | |
| 2010–2011 | Shoutout! | Herself (host/performer) | |
| 2011 | Wansapanataym: Flores De Mayumi | Sunshine | |
| 2011 | Reputasyon | young Catherine Villamayor | |
| 2011–2012 | Maria la del Barrio | Vanessa dela Vega | |
| 2012 | Oka2kat | Princess | |
| 2012 | Aryana | Perlita | |
| 2012 | Maalaala Mo Kaya: Manika | Nene | |
| 2012 | Wansapanataym: The Amazing Gelliescope | Janice Tuazon | |
| 2012 | Maalaala Mo Kaya: Bimpo | April | |
| 2013–2020 | ASAP | Herself (performer) | |
| 2013 | Juan dela Cruz | Shermaine | |
| 2013 | Little Champ | Brownsugar | |
| 2013 | Wansapanataym: Mommy on Duty | Jonah del Rosario | |
| 2013 | Muling Buksan ang Puso | Natalia Mercado | |
| 2013 | Maalaala Mo Kaya: Cake | Nene | |
| 2014 | Luv U | Joey | |
| 2014 | Maalaala Mo Kaya: Kwintas | young Angie | |
| 2014 | Pinoy Big Brother: All In | Herself (housemate) / 3rd Big Placer | |
| 2014 | Maalaala Mo Kaya: Bonnet | Rovil Villas | |
| 2015 | Maalaala Mo Kaya: Lubid | Nine | |
| 2015 | Nasaan Ka Nang Kailangan Kita | Corrine Natividad | |
| 2016 | FPJ's Ang Probinsyano | young Flora Borja | |
| 2016 | Maalaala Mo Kaya: Bangketa | Ana "Naning" Presas | |
| 2016 | The Greatest Love | teenage Amanda Alegre | |
| 2016 | Maalaala Mo Kaya: Silver Medal | Hidilyn Diaz | |
| 2017 | Ipaglaban Mo: Tiwala | Divine Perez | |
| 2017 | Maalaala Mo Kaya: Picture | Aisah | |
| 2017 | Maalaala Mo Kaya: Kotse-Kotsehan | Aisah | |
| 2018 | Ipaglaban Mo: Tapang | Lynn San Jose | |
| 2018 | Precious Hearts Romances Presents: Araw Gabi | Amber Distrito | |
| 2018 | Ipaglaban Mo: Nars | May | |
| 2018–2019 | Precious Hearts Romances Presents: Los Bastardos | Gigi Octavio | |
| 2019 | Ipaglaban Mo: Akusasyon | Herlyn | |
| 2019 | Project Feb 14 | Ma. Anita "Annie" Mariano | |
| 2019 | Ipaglaban Mo: Palaban | Clara | |
| 2019 | Maalaala Mo Kaya: Red Roses | Lina San Miguel | |
| 2020–2021 | I Got You | Rissa | |
| 2021 | Maalaala Mo Kaya: Lie Detector | Roanne Carreon | |
| 2021 | Gen Z | Matet Castro | |
| 2021 | Huwag Kang Mangamba | Rose Aguilar/Emily Abuel | |
| 2021 | Maalaala Mo Kaya: Ginto | Hidilyn Diaz | |
| 2021–present | ASAP | Herself (performer) | |
| 2022 | Click, Like, Share: Unseen | Mariel Espanto | |
| 2022 | The Broken Marriage Vow | Diane Riagon | |
| 2022 | Maalaala Mo Kaya: Simbahan | Angel Quiped | |
| 2023 | Dirty Linen | young Cielo | |
| 2023 | Cattleya Killer | Agent Tina Galvez | |
| 2023 | Simula sa Gitna | Missy | |
| 2023–2024 | Nag-aapoy na Damdamin | Olivia De Amor-Buencamino / Claire Bautista-Salazar | |
| 2025 | Si Sol at Si Luna | Luna | |
| 2026 | Love Is Never Gone | Larajean Loyola | |
| 2026 | Juan and Lily Run for SK † | Joey | |

=== Microdrama ===
| Year | Title | Role | Ref. |
|---|---|---|---|
| 2026 | The Perfect Wife | Jem Dela Minez | |

== Discography ==
=== Featured artist ===
- Various parodies on Goin' Bulilit (2005–2008)
- Pinoy Big Brother: All In originals - "Teen Love Song", "Turtle Song", "Bibimbap" (All In housemates, 2014)
- "Move On" (Sponge Cola, 2015)
- "Pag-ibig", "Walang Iba" (Nasaan Ka Nang Kailangan Kita (Songs from the Heart), 2015)
- Bato sa Buhangin (new cover version, duet with Morissette, 2019)

== Accolades ==
Awards and Nominations
| Year | Award giving body | Category | Nominated work | Results | Ref. |
|---|---|---|---|---|---|
| 2012 | New York Festivals - International TV and Film | Best Performance by an Actress | Maalaala Mo Kaya: "Manika" | Nominated | |
| 2012 | 26th PMPC Star Awards for TV | Best Single Performance by an Actress | Maalaala Mo Kaya: "Manika" | Nominated | |
| 2012 | 10th Golden Screen TV Awards | Outstanding Performance by an Actress in a Single Drama | Maalaala Mo Kaya: "Manika" | Nominated | |
| 2012 | PEP Awards | PEP's Bets for Stardom in 2013 | | Included; Rank no. 12 | |
| 2013 | 27th PMPC Star Awards for TV | Best Single Performance by an Actress | Maalaala Mo Kaya: "Bimpo" | Nominated | |
| 2017 | 31st PMPC Star Awards for TV | Best Single Performance by an Actress | Maalaala Mo Kaya: "Kotse-Kotsehan" | Nominated | |
| 2023 | 4th TAG Chicago Awards | Best Actress | Nag-aapoy na Damdamin as Claire Salazar and Olivia Buencamino | Won | |
