= List of Nang Ngumiti ang Langit episodes =

Nang Ngumiti ang Langit (lit. 'When the Sky Smiles'/English: Michaela) is a 2019 Philippine drama television series starring Sophia Reola. The series premiered on ABS-CBN's PrimeTanghali noontime block and worldwide via The Filipino Channel from March 25 to October 18, 2019, replacing Playhouse, and was replaced by I Have a Lover in the Philippines.

== Series overview ==
Season	Episodes	Originally released	
Season	Episodes	First released	Last released
1	147	March 25, 2019	October 18, 2019

== Episodes ==
=== Season 1 (2019) ===
No. overall	No. in season	Title	Original release date	Kantar Media Ratings (nationwide)
1	1	"Unang Ngiti"	March 25, 2019	15.8%
2	2	"Bunso"	March 26, 2019	17.0%
3	3	"Laban Lang"	March 27, 2019	18.1%
4	4	"Angel"	March 28, 2019	16.6%
5	5	"Bagong Buhay"	March 29, 2019	16.8%
6	6	"Miss K"	April 1, 2019	15.9%
7	7	"Kasambahay"	April 2, 2019	16.3%
8	8	"Perfect Score"	April 3, 2019	16.9%
9	9	"Ice Cream"	April 4, 2019	16.8%
10	10	"Mik-mik Mouse"	April 5, 2019	16.0%
11	11	"Layas"	April 8, 2019	16.5%
12	12	"Mugshot"	April 9, 2019	19.3%
13	13	"School Project"	April 10, 2019	16.7%
14	14	"Guardian Angel"	April 11, 2019	16.4%
15	15	"Secret Friendship"	April 12, 2019	16.3%
16	16	"Picture Frame"	April 15, 2019	17.4%
17	17	"Hero"	April 16, 2019	16.8%
18	18	"Tsaa"	April 17, 2019	18.5%
19	19	"Laya"	April 22, 2019	16.1%
20	20	"MichaEla"	April 23, 2019	15.5%
21	21	"MikBriJo"	April 24, 2019	18.6%
22	22	"Panyo"	April 25, 2019	18.6%
23	23	"Almusal"	April 26, 2019	16.3%
24	24	"Lola Divina"	April 29, 2019	17.2%
25	25	"Poster"	April 30, 2019	15.9%
26	26	"Pambansang Ate"	May 1, 2019	14.0%
27	27	"Summer is Love"	May 2, 2019	16.7%
28	28	"Tagutaguan"	May 3, 2019	17.8%
29	29	"Stranger"	May 6, 2019	14.6%
30	30	"Mr. Michael"	May 7, 2019	17.3%
31	31	"Tulog Na"	May 8, 2019	17.5%
32	32	"Karga"	May 9, 2019	17.2%
33	33	"Yakap"	May 10, 2019	17.4%
34	34	"Welcome Back"	May 14, 2019 (Note: Episode 34 did not air on May 13 during the 2019 Philippine general election news coverage.)	16.9%
35	35	"Surprise"	May 15, 2019	17.0%
36	36	"Bracelet"	May 16, 2019	15.3%
37	37	"AmBriJoMik"	May 17, 2019	17.3%
38	38	"Pasasalamat"	May 20, 2019	15.5%
39	39	"Sikreto"	May 21, 2019	13.9%
40	40	"Tulong"	May 22, 2019	14.3%
41	41	"Truth"	May 23, 2019	14.8%
42	42	"Testigo"	May 24, 2019	14.0%
43	43	"Reunited"	May 27, 2019	14.7%
44	44	"Be Our Guest"	May 28, 2019	15.8%
45	45	"Lipat Kwarto"	May 29, 2019	15.4%
46	46	"Little Hero"	May 30, 2019	15.3%
47	47	"Dear Tito Michael"	May 31, 2019	15.0%
48	48	"Hadlang"	June 3, 2019	16.5%
49	49	"Pakitang Tao"	June 4, 2019	16.0%
50	50	"Card Day"	June 5, 2019	17.6%
51	51	"Dalaw"	June 6, 2019	18.7%
52	52	"Bullfrog"	June 7, 2019	17.3%
53	53	"Recognition Day"	June 10, 2019	16.9%
54	54	"Award"	June 11, 2019	20.9%
55	55	"Set Up"	June 12, 2019	19.4%
56	56	"Kulong"	June 13, 2019	17.9%
57	57	"Paalam"	June 14, 2019	20.3%
58	58	"Sepanx"	June 17, 2019	15.4%
59	59	"Oplan Mikmik"	June 18, 2019	16.9%
60	60	"House Arrest"	June 19, 2019	19.8%
61	61	"Takas"	June 20, 2019	17.7%
62	62	"Tatay"	June 21, 2019	19.4%
63	63	"Family"	June 24, 2019	16.1%
64	64	"Cuz"	June 25, 2019	15.7%
65	65	"Lola No More"	June 26, 2019	18.4%
66	66	"Lolo"	June 27, 2019	17.8%
67	67	"Marriage Certificate"	June 28, 2019	18.0%
68	68	"Tagapagmana"	July 1, 2019	17.2%
69	69	"Captain Sorry"	July 2, 2019	17.5%
70	70	"Alaala"	July 3, 2019	17.0%
71	71	"Selfless"	July 4, 2019	17.9%
72	72	"Special Delivery"	July 5, 2019	16.1%
73	73	"Parental Guardians"	July 8, 2019	18.4%
74	74	"Problem Child"	July 9, 2019	17.9%
75	75	"DNA Test"	July 10, 2019	16.6%
76	76	"Daddy"	July 11, 2019	17.6%
77	77	"Positive"	July 12, 2019	16.2%
78	78	"Alsa Balutan"	July 15, 2019	15.5%
79	79	"Kampihan"	July 16, 2019	16.0%
80	80	"Mirror Mirror"	July 17, 2019	15.7%
81	81	"Pasyal"	July 18, 2019	16.5%
82	82	"Bahay-bahayan"	July 19, 2019	16.4%
83	83	"Lola is Sick"	July 22, 2019	14.2%
84	84	"Disiplina"	July 23, 2019	16.0%
85	85	"Para Kay Lola"	July 24, 2019	16.1%
86	86	"Family Matters"	July 25, 2019	16.1%
87	87	"Apo"	July 26, 2019	14.0%
88	88	"Walang Aalis"	July 29, 2019	14.0%
89	89	"Daily Chores"	July 30, 2019	14.2%
90	90	"Drama Princess"	July 31, 2019	14.0%
91	91	"Buntis"	August 1, 2019	15.2%
92	92	"Hinala"	August 2, 2019	17.2%
93	93	"Bistado"	August 5, 2019	16.0%
94	94	"Masamang Balak"	August 6, 2019	16.3%
95	95	"Amazing Grace"	August 7, 2019	15.4%
96	96	"Alagang Grace"	August 8, 2019	15.9%
97	97	"Oplan Buntis"	August 9, 2019	16.0%
98	98	"Bagong Tanim"	August 12, 2019	17.0%
99	99	"Injured si Lolo"	August 13, 2019	15.7%
100	100	"Alagang Mikmik"	August 14, 2019	15.0%
101	101	"HBD, Cuz"	August 15, 2019	17.7%
102	102	"Party Surprises"	August 16, 2019	16.0%
103	103	"Honesty"	August 19, 2019	16.9%
104	104	"Deny Pa More"	August 20, 2019	17.9%
105	105	"Secrets"	August 21, 2019	17.0%
106	106	"Leksyon"	August 22, 2019	19.0%
107	107	"Huli Ka"	August 23, 2019	17.1%
108	108	"Buking"	August 26, 2019	17.8%
109	109	"Saving Grace"	August 27, 2019	18.6%
110	110	"Truth Hurts"	August 28, 2019	18.1%
111	111	"Runaway Brit"	August 29, 2019	17.3%
112	112	"Finding Britney"	August 30, 2019	17.8%
113	113	"Lost and Found"	September 2, 2019	17.2%
114	114	"Hello Lolo"	September 3, 2019	16.9%
115	115	"Lolo vs Lola"	September 4, 2019	17.5%
116	116	"Family Feud"	September 5, 2019	16.7%
117	117	"Takeover"	September 6, 2019	17.8%
118	118	"New Rules"	September 9, 2019	15.8%
119	119	"Malunggay Juice"	September 10, 2019	16.4%
120	120	"Para Kay Bunso"	September 11, 2019	17.3%
121	121	"El Salvador Steal"	September 12, 2019	17.6%
122	122	"Ang Tamis"	September 13, 2019	16.7%
123	123	"MikBriJoPlus"	September 16, 2019	17.2%
124	124	"Pagsabog"	September 17, 2019	18.5%
125	125	"Sisihan"	September 18, 2019	17.2%
126	126	"Hustisya"	September 19, 2019	17.0%
127	127	"Bintang"	September 20, 2019	15.9%
128	128	"Hiling"	September 23, 2019	16.1%
129	129	"First Kiss"	September 24, 2019	17.0%
130	130	"Trending"	September 25, 2019	16.8%
131	131	"Troublemaker"	September 26, 2019	17.1%
132	132	"Sorry, Lolo"	September 27, 2019	17.5%
133	133	"Pag-amin"	September 30, 2019	17.5%
134	134	"Witness"	October 1, 2019	17.3%
135	135	"Ebidensya"	October 2, 2019	17.0%
136	136	"Lason"	October 3, 2019	17.2%
137	137	"Nightmare"	October 4, 2019	19.0%
138	138	"Hukay"	October 7, 2019	18.0%
139	139	"Lihim"	October 8, 2019	19.4%
140	140	"It's a Trap"	October 9, 2019	18.4%
141	141	"Panganib"	October 10, 2019	18.5%
142	142	"Switch"	October 11, 2019	18.9%
143	143	"Hostage"	October 14, 2019	17.8%
144	144	"Sacrifice"	October 15, 2019	19.8%
145	145	"Prayers for Mikmik"	October 16, 2019	19.1%
146	146	"Gising Na, Mikmik"	October 17, 2019	19.8%
147	147	"The Heavenly Finale"	October 18, 2019	21.3%

Episodes notes
