= Everybody Hapi =

- Genre: Sitcom
- Created by: MPB Primedia, Inc.
- Opening theme: "Everybody Hapi" by Baywalk Bodies
- Country of origin: Philippines
- Original language: Filipino
- No. of episodes: 92

Production
- Running time: 60 minutes

Original release
- Network: TV5
- Release: November 23, 2008 – September 4, 2010

Everybody Hapi (lit. 'Everybody Happy') is a Philippine television sitcom series broadcast by TV5. It aired from November 23, 2008 to September 4, 2010, replacing My OFW Story.

== Cast ==
Final cast

- John Estrada as Jim
- Long Mejia as Carrey
- Alex Gonzaga as Cathy
- Nova Villa as Lola Candy
- Christian Vasquez as Michael
- Jon Avila as Jordan
- Carmi Martin as Ursula
- Carla Humphries as Erika
- Mr. Fu as Ador
- Bogart as B
- Sammy Lagmay as Sam/Sammy

Former cast

- Matt Evans as Steve
- Randolf Stamatelaky as Paul
- Roxanne Guinoo as Jenny
- Eugene Domingo as Babet

== See also ==
- List of TV5 (Philippine TV network) original programming
