= Muling Buksan ang Puso =

2013 Philippine television drama series

- Title card
- Also known as: If Only
- Genre: Melodrama; Romantic drama
- Created by: ABS-CBN Studios: Ma. Regina Amigo; Rondel P. Lindayag
- Developed by: ABS-CBN Studios
- Written by: Rondel P. Lindayag; Ma. Regina Amigo; Mariami Tanangco-Domingo
- Directed by: Nuel C. Naval; Manny Q. Palo; Jojo A. Saguin; Don M. Cuaresma
- Creative director: Johnny Delos Santos
- Starring: Julia Montes; Enrique Gil; Enchong Dee
- Theme music composer: George Canseco
- Opening theme: "Muling Buksan ang Puso" by Erik Santos; "Muling Buksan ang Puso" by Lani Misalucha
- Country of origin: Philippines
- Original language: Filipino
- No. of episodes: 65 (list of episodes)

Production
- Executive producers: Carlo Katigbak; Cory Vidanes; Laurenti Dyogi; Roldeo T. Endrinal
- Producers: Jennifer B. Soliman; Julie Anne R. Benitez
- Running time: 30-45 minutes; Monday to Friday at 21:15 (PST)
- Production company: Dreamscape Entertainment Television

Original release
- Network: ABS-CBN
- Release: July 8 – October 4, 2013

Muling Buksan ang Puso (International title: If Only / transl. Open The Heart Again) is a 2013 Philippine television drama melodrama series broadcast by ABS-CBN. Directed by Nuel C. Naval, Manny Q. Palo, Jojo A. Saguin and Don M. Cuaresma, it stars Julia Montes, Enrique Gil, and Enchong Dee. It aired on the network's Primetime Bida line up and worldwide on TFC from July 8 to October 4, 2013, replacing Apoy sa Dagat and was replaced by Maria Mercedes.

== Cast and characters ==
=== Main cast ===
- Julia Montes as Sarah Beltran-Dela Vega / Sarah B. Salazar-Dela Vega / Sarah B. Dela Vega
- Enrique Gil as Francisco "Francis" B. Dela Vega / Francisco "Francis" Andrada / Francisco "Francis" Beltran
- Enchong Dee as Leonel Bernardo Beltran / Leonel Bernardo B. Cabigas

=== Supporting cast ===
- Susan Roces as Doña Adelina Laurel-Beltran
- Pilar Pilapil as Elvira Santelices
- Dante Rivero as Bernardo Beltran
- Cherie Gil as Marietta Beltran
- Agot Isidro as Carissa Beltran-Dela Vega
- Jestoni Alarcon as Nicholas Salazar / Ricardo Espinosa
- Daniel Fernando as Ignacio Andrada
- Dominic Ochoa as Edmund Dela Vega
- Malou Crisologo as Lavida Salvacion
- Jane Oineza as Natalia Mercado
- Matt Evans as Pancho Mercado
- Pooh as Xenon Mercado

=== Guest cast ===
- Bon Vidar as Mayor
- Paolo O'Hara as Simeon
- Ydda Yaneza as Ika Manlapas
- Jong Cuenco as Atty. San Pedro
- Menggie Cobarrubias as Arturo Rivera
- Froilan Sales

=== Special participation ===
- Christopher de Leon as Anton "El Patron" Silvestre / Anton Cabigas
- Bembol Roco as Ernie Cabigas
- Dimples Romana as young Adelina Laurel-Beltran
- Iza Calzado as young Elvira Santelices
- Joem Bascon as young Bernardo Beltran
- Belle Mariano as young Sarah Beltran
- Lukas Magallano as young Francis Dela Vega
- Joaquin Reyes as young Leonel Beltran
- Bryan Santos as young Anton Silvestre / Anton Cabigas

== Production ==
Initially, Muling Buksan ang Puso was originally planned to be premiered back-to-back with Got to Believe on July 8, 2013, replacing Apoy sa Dagat and Missing You. But due to the request of Koreanovela fans and the postponement of Got to Believe in favor of Korean drama That Winter, the Wind Blows, it was first premiered in the 8:30-9:15pm timeslot instead, taking over the timeslot previously occupied by Huwag Ka Lang Mawawala. On August 26, 2013, the series later moved to the original 9:15-10:00pm timeslot to give way for Got to Believe.

== Casting changes ==
Amalia Fuentes was initially part of the cast to play Elvira, but due to misconception of her role, she later dropped it and she was replaced by Pilar Pilapil. After dropping her role on the said TV series, she had a special participation role in the critically acclaimed TV series Huwag Ka Lang Mawawala top billed by Judy Ann Santos.

== Soundtrack ==
Muling Buksan ang Puso: The Official Soundtrack

Soundtrack album by Various Artists
- Released: July 31, 2013 (base on iTunes)
- Recorded: 2013
- Genre: Ballad
- Length: 32:56
- Label: Star Music

The main theme song is called "Muling Buksan ang Puso" and has three versions, two are sung as a solo by singers Lani Misalucha and Erik Santos, while the third as a duet. The song was originally sung by Basil Valdez for a 1985 Serialized Comic to film, starring Vilma Santos and Lorna Tolentino. Other singers also provided revivals of many Philippine hit songs for the soundtrack. Charice sang a cover of the song "Yakap", originally by Filipino-Spanish singer Júnior. Angeline Quinto covered the song "Dapat Ka Bang Mahalin?", by Sharon Cuneta. Juris provided a revival of "Paano Kita Mapasasalamatan?" popularized by Kuh Ledesma. Jed Madela sings "Sinasamba Kita", by Rey Valera. The soundtrack album was released by Star Music on July 31, 2013.

No.	Title	Artist	Length
1.	"Muling Buksan ang Puso"	Erik Santos	5:08
2.	"Yakap"	Charice	4:35
3.	"Paano Kita Mapasasalamatan"	Juris Fernandez	3:59
4.	"Dapat Ka Bang Mahalin"	Angeline Quinto	4:07
5.	"Sinasamba Kita"	Jed Madela	5:19
6.	"Muling Buksan ang Puso (Female Version)"	Lani Misalucha	5:18
7.	"Muling Buksan ang Puso (Duet Version)"	Erik Santos and Lani Misalucha	5:10

== Reception ==
Muling Buksan ang Puso has captivated more viewers nationwide after it hit its all-time high national TV ratings of 30.4% on July 24, 2013 based on data from Kantar Media Philippines covering urban and rural homes nationwide. During its 8:30pm airing, it peaked 32.7% on August 2, 2013. On its 9:15pm timeslot, it peaked 25.7% on its finale episode on October 4, 2013. The series also ranked 10th in the Top 15 programs from January to December 2013 based on year round data from Kantar Media Philippines with an average rating of 30.4%.

KANTAR MEDIA NATIONAL TV RATINGS (8:30PM PST / 9:15PM PST)
PILOT EPISODE	FINALE EPISODE	PEAK	AVERAGE	SOURCE
28.4%	25.7%	32.7%	30.4%	

Muling Buksan ang Puso and casts were nominated at the PMPC Star Awards for Television, an annual award giving body recognizing the outstanding programming produced by the several TV networks in the Philippines every year.

== Accolades ==
Award/s and Recognition/s
Year	Award-Giving Body	Category	Result
2014	28th PMPC Star Awards for TV	BEST PRIMETIME TV SERIES	Nominated
2014	28th PMPC Star Awards for TV	BEST DRAMA ACTOR (Enchong Dee)	Nominated
2014	28th PMPC Star Awards for TV	BEST DRAMA SUPPORTING ACTRESS (Cherie Gil)	Nominated

== Broadcast ==
=== Local broadcast ===
The series originally aired on ABS-CBN from July 8, 2013 to October 4, 2013.

It aired re-runs on Jeepney TV from November 14, 2016 to December 28, 2016 (replacing the re-runs of Nasaan Ka Maruja?); December 18, 2018 to February 23, 2019 (replacing the re-runs of Bagito); January 27, 2020 to March 6, 2020 (replacing the re-runs of Sana Bukas pa ang Kahapon); and December 18, 2023 to February 2, 2024 (replacing the re-runs of My Dear Heart).

=== International broadcast ===
- Malaysia (Broadcast channel: Astro Bella)
- Kenya (Broadcast channel: NTV) 1 October to 16 November 2018

== See also ==
- List of programs broadcast by ABS-CBN
- List of ABS-CBN Studios original drama series
