= Nang Ngumiti ang Langit =

Philippine drama series

- Title card
- Also known as: Michaela
- Genre: Family drama Thriller; Soap opera
- Created by: Mel Mendoza-Del Rosario
- Written by: Denise O'Hara; Michael Bryan Transfiguracion; Ruel Montañez; Erica Bautista; Mark Gopez; Jimuel dela Cruz
- Directed by: FM Reyes; Marinette Natividad-de Guzman
- Starring: Sophia Reola
- Music by: Cesar Francis Concio
- Opening theme: "Yakap Mo" by Lara Maigue
- Composers: Jonathan Manalo; Andrei Dionisio
- Country of origin: Philippines
- Original language: Filipino
- No. of seasons: 2
- No. of episodes: 147 (list of episodes)

Production
- Executive producers: Carlo Katigbak; Cory Vidanes; Laurenti Dyogi; Ruel Bayani
- Producers: Edgar Joseph J. Mallari; Minelle Nielo Espiritu; Rizza Gonzales-Ebriega
- Production locations: Metro Manila, Philippines
- Editors: Jay Mendoza; Mai Marcial; BJ Karganilla; Kristine Hortaleza; Renz Amisola; John Paul Ponce
- Running time: 28–35 minutes
- Production company: RGE Drama Unit

Original release
- Network: ABS-CBN
- Release: March 25 – October 18, 2019

Related
- Anak (2000, Star Cinema); Ikaw ang Lahat sa Akin (2005); Gulong ng Palad (2006); Sana Maulit Muli (2007); Iisa Pa Lamang (2008); Annaliza (2013-2014); FlordeLiza (2015); Pangako Sa 'Yo (2015) (2015-2016); Tubig at Langis (2016); Huwag Kang Mangamba (2021)

Nang Ngumiti ang Langit (International title: Michaela / transl. When the Heaven Smiled) is a 2019 Philippine television drama series broadcast by ABS-CBN. Directed by FM Reyes, it stars Sophia Reola, Cristine Reyes, RK Bagatsing, Enzo Pineda and Shaina Magdayao. It aired on the network's PrimeTanghali line-up from March 25 to October 18, 2019, replacing Playhouse and was replaced by I Have a Lover.

== Premise ==
Michaela "Mikmik" Dimaano is a bright, wise cracking 9-year-old girl living happily with her mother Ella and her adoptive grandmother Ester in a quiet province. Everything changes when Ella is diagnosed with late onset leukemia, the same time Mikmik discovers her true relations to Divina Salvador, a wealthy businesswoman. In order to pay for her mother's medication, Mikmik, with the help of Ester, visits Divina but is rejected, as Ella is blamed for her step-brother Eric's death. Ella then dies, and Mikmik is taken by Ruth, her late mother's best friend, to live with the Salvadors.

The Salvador family consists of the matriarch, Divina – the wife of the late Gabriel Salvador and head of El Salvador Builders, Katrina – a business executive and wife of Divina's late son Eric, and Katrina's daughters: the harsh and envious Amber, and the misguided but kind hearted Britney. Mikmik immediately finds refuge and comfort in Benjie and Ruth's son Joseph, but has to face the spite and cruelties of her cold step-grandmother Divina, her wicked step-aunt Katrina, and her older step-cousin Amber. Divina and Katrina's hatred stem from the fact that Mikmik is the only rightful heir to the Salvador wealth: Ella is the legitimate child of Gabriel as his marriage with her mother Letty was not annulled, making Divina a mistress, and Eric was Divina's adoptive son, due to the fact she cannot bear children.

When a mysterious man from the past named Michael Villaluna resurfaces and creates a paternal connection with Mikmik, things escalate to greater heights. As family feuds worsen, no lies will remain undiscovered, no secrets will remain unrevealed, and eventually Mikmik will get the happiness and the complete family that she truly deserves.

== Cast and characters ==
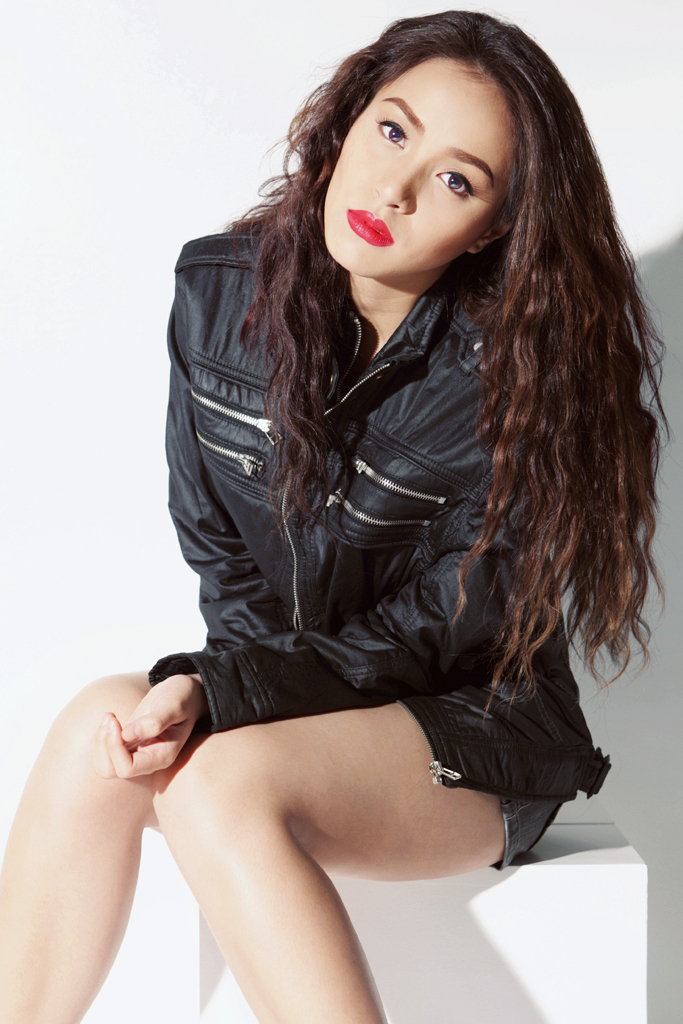
Cristine Reyes portrays Katrina Balingit-Salvador.

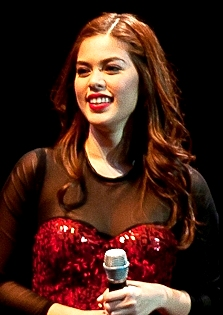
Shaina Magdayao portrays Grace E. Andrada

Main cast

- Sophia Reola as Michaela "Mikmik" S. Villaluna
  - Althea Ruedas as young Mikmik
- Cristine Reyes as Katrina Balingit-Salvador
  - Veyda Inoval as young Katrina
- RK Bagatsing as Michael Villaluna
  - Izzy Canillo as young Michael
- Enzo Pineda as James Villaluna
- Shaina Magdayao as Grace E. Andrada

Supporting cast

- Pilar Pilapil as Doña Divina Salvador
  - Gwen Zamora as young Divina
- Dante Rivero as Don David Villaluna
- Matet de Leon as Ruth Estacio-Dimagmaliw
- Keempee de Leon as Benjamin "Benjie" Dimagmaliw
- Ces Quesada as Ester Dimaano
- Michelle Vito as Anna Z. Defensor
  - Hannah Lopez Vito as young Anna
- Vance Larena as Kokoy Santos
- Moi Bien as Barbie Dimaculangan
- Lotlot Bustamante as Marilyn Ledesma
- Pat Liwanag as Chichi Magbanua
- Hyubs Azarcon as Leroy "Roy" B. Gonzales
- Ethyl Anne Osorio as Sarah Perez
- Teroy Guzman as Atty. Reynante "Nante" Castillo
  - Jome Silayan as young Nante
- Nina Ricci Alagao as Atty. Liberty Sandejas
- Sonjia Calit as Atty. Borja
- Heart Ramos as Britney B. Salvador
- Krystal Mejes as Amber B. Salvador
- Miguel Vergara as Joseph E. Dimagmaliw
- Elisia Parmisano as Rachel Villaamore
- Miguel Esteves as Carl Emmanuel A. Bermudez

Guest cast

- Kaye Abad as Ella D. Salvador
  - Rhed Bustamante as young Ella
- Rafa Siguion-Reyna as Eric Salvador
- Isay Alvarez as Leticia "Letty" N. Dimaano-Salvador
  - Jennica Garcia as young Letty
- Leo Rialp as Gabriel M. Salvador
  - Mico Palanca as young Gabriel
- Tetchie Agbayani as Elizabeth Villaluna
- Carlos Morales as Lloyd
- Jaycee Parker as Glenda Zamora
- Malou Canzana as Alexis
- Levi Ignacio as Rogelio Magno
- Paolo Serrano as Victor
- JB Agustin as Biboy
- Isaac Reodica as Rocky
- Althea Guanzon as Diana
- Pipay Navarro as Ashley

== Broadcast ==
Nang Ngumiti ang Langit premiered on ABS-CBN on March 25, 2019.

=== Timeslot block ===
It was the last late-morning drama series to be produced by the network before the COVID-19 pandemic and its shutdown in May 2020.

=== Re-runs ===
Nang Ngumiti ang Langit aired re-runs on Jeepney TV from January 6 to April 17, 2020; January 29 to October 1, 2023; November 18, 2024 to February 28, 2025 (also aired on ALLTV); August 3 to November 13, 2026.

It re-aired on Kapamilya Channel's Kapamilya Gold afternoon block, Kapamilya Online Live, and A2Z's Zuper Hapon from July 26, 2021 to February 18, 2022, replacing the reruns of Magpahanggang Wakas and was replaced by the reruns of Be My Lady.

== Ratings ==
Kantar Media National TV Ratings (11:30AM PST)
Pilot Episode	Finale Episode	Peak	Average
15.8% March 25, 2019	21.3% October 18, 2019	21.3% October 18, 2019	16.9%

== See also ==
- List of programs broadcast by ABS-CBN
- List of ABS-CBN drama series
- List of programs broadcast by Jeepney TV
