= Trophy Wife (film) =

- Theatrical movie poster
- Directed by: Andoy L. Ranay
- Screenplay by: Keiko Aquino
- Story by: Elwood Perez
- Produced by: Vic del Rosario Jr.; Raam Punjabi
- Starring: Cristine Reyes; Derek Ramsay; Heart Evangelista; John Estrada
- Cinematography: Lee Briones-Meily
- Edited by: George Jarlego
- Music by: Teresa Barrozo
- Production companies: Viva Films; MVP Entertainment
- Distributed by: Viva Films
- Release date: July 30, 2014
- Running time: 110 minutes
- Country: Philippines
- Languages: Filipino; English
- Box office: ₱31,058,983.00

Trophy Wife is a 2014 Filipino romantic thriller film directed by Andoy Ranay and starring Cristine Reyes, Derek Ramsay, Heart Evangelista, and John Estrada. The film will be distributed by Viva Films with the co-production of Multivision Pictures and was released on July 30, 2014 in theatres nationwide.

== Plot ==
Chino (Derek Ramsay), a rich playboy, meets Lani (Cristine Reyes), a GI baby of a former prostitute, when he visits Angeles City for a bar hopping. During Chino and Lani's whirlwind romance, Chino gets into a fight with a mayor's son that leads his brother Sammy (John Estrada) to send him to America. Lani, with no knowledge of Chino's departure to America, follows Chino to Manila to tell him about her pregnancy. Upon Lani's visit, Sammy refuses Lani entry to their house. As Sammy leaves the house, not looking at the commotion Lani is causing outside his car, he instructs his driver to ignore Lani's pleas and carry on driving. The driver accidentally bumps into Lani, causing her miscarriage.

With nothing else going on for her, Lani holds on to her American dream. Blessed with beauty and a whistle-bait figure, she plans to use these assets to inch her way toward advancing her social status, and subsequently, to plot vengeance against the brothers. Winning Ms. Body Beautiful and working as a joiner in a bar in Manila, Lani monitors the status of Chino and Sammy. Lani's plot begins to unravel when the American Ambassador takes her to a society ball. As part of the elite, Sammy also attends the ball. Sammy instantly notices Lani's smashing looks and gets smitten.

Meanwhile, a homesick Chino in America finds comfort in his newfound friend, Gwen (Heart Evangelista). With Gwen's attributes, Chino falls for Gwen in no time. One night, Chino receives a phone call from Sammy asking him to come back to Manila to meet his new sister-in-law. Chino, together with Gwen, excitedly heads back to Manila to be introduced to the new bride. Chino's excitement turns into despair when he realizes that his new sister-in-law turns out to be Lani, the girl he abandoned.

Unable to confess to Sammy and Gwen, Chino's paranoia and Lani's constant seduction create a rift between the two brothers. Little did Sammy and Chino know, the plot has been carefully planned by Lani and Gwen. Gwen is actually Lani's long-lost sister who was adopted by a Filipino family in America. Gwen, who is trying to make up for their years apart, agrees to Lani's plot. The pact between the two sisters becomes complicated, however, when Gwen slowly falls for Chino.

Lani feels betrayed by Gwen's feelings for Chino, and promises to win Chino back. Lani succeeds. Sammy discovers the infidelity of his wife. Sammy's violent streak surfaces as his jealousy turns to rage. He soon discovers the connivance of the sisters and takes Lani to a remote cabin to kill her.

Gwen learns from their mother about Lani's miscarriage. She decides to tell Chino about Lani's misfortune together with her secret as Lani's long-lost sister. Realizing the absence of Sammy and Lani in the house, Chino and Gwen seek help from Sammy's ex-wife. After they obtained vital information about the whereabouts of Sammy and Lani, Chino and Gwen head to the cabin to save Lani. Gwen and Chino find the cabin as Sammy is torturing Lani. Chino and Sammy wrestle for the gun. The unthinkable happens. Chino kills Sammy.

Chino faces trial and is found innocent. As he comes out of prison, Gwen waits for him. While Chino and Gwen start their new lives, Lani, who now inherits Sammy's fortune, finally fulfills her American dream

== Cast ==
=== Main cast ===
- Cristine Reyes as Lani
- Derek Ramsay as Joaquin "Chino" Lee
- Heart Evangelista as Gwen
- John Estrada as Sammy Lee

=== Supporting cast ===
- Jaime Fabregas as Bobby
- Jackie Lou Blanco as Sally
- G. Toengi as Ella
- Jovic Monsod as Mon
- Kian Kazemi as Daniel
- John James Uy as Johnboy
- Clint Bondad as Chino's Friend
- Jay Roa as Chino's Friend
- Phoebe Walker as Chino's Friend
- Akiko Orita as Chino's Friend
- Creesha Galvero as Chino's Friend
- Minco Fabregas as Attorney Littau
- Dolly Gutierrez as Clerk of Court
- Frances Makil-Ignacio as Clerk of Court
- Billy Villeta as Clerk of Court
- Clark Merced as Clerk of Court
- Debbie Garcia as Clerk of Court
- Richard Cunanan as Clerk of Court
- Pamela Nieva as Clerk of Court
- Joel Saracho as Clerk of Court
- Gwendolyn Garcia as Congw. Abacillas
- Ryan Yllana as Senator Villareal

== Awards and nominations ==
Award-giving body	Recipient	Award	Result
31st PMPC Star Awards for Movies	John Estrada	Movie Actor of the Year	Nominated
