= Love Child (2024 film) =

- Directed by: Jonathan Jurilla
- Screenplay by: Arden Rod Condez; Arianna Martinez; Angel Benjamin
- Story by: Jonathan Jurilla
- Produced by: Arden Rod Condez
- Starring: RK Bagatsing; Jane Oineza; John Tyrron Ramos
- Cinematography: Rommel Sales
- Edited by: John Paul Ponce
- Production companies: Regal Entertainment; Southern Lantern Studios
- Release date: August 2, 2024 (Cinemalaya)
- Running time: 100 minutes
- Country: Philippines
- Language: Filipino

Love Child is a 2024 Philippine romantic comedy-drama film starring RK Bagatsing, Jane Oineza, and John Tyrron Ramos which was directed by Jonathan Jurilla. It about a young couple who would learn that their son has autism.

== Plot ==
Paolo and Ayla are former college sweethearts who leave school after Ayla becomes pregnant with their son, Kali. Years later, they struggle to make ends meet while raising Kali, whose delayed development eventually leads to a diagnosis of autism spectrum disorder. The diagnosis forces the couple to confront the financial and emotional demands of therapy, special education, and full-time caregiving.

Paolo works multiple jobs while Ayla devotes most of her time to caring for Kali. Hoping to earn additional income, they open a coffee cart business, but it fails to provide the financial stability they need. Their situation worsens when Kali falls ill and is hospitalized, forcing Ayla to seek financial help from her estranged mother despite Paolo's objections.

The constant stress places increasing strain on Paolo and Ayla's relationship, leading to repeated arguments over money, parenting, and their future. They also encounter prejudice and misunderstanding from people unfamiliar with autism. As they continue attending therapy sessions and working with teachers and specialists, they gradually learn to better understand Kali's condition and adapt to his needs.

Despite the hardships they face, Paolo and Ayla choose to remain together and continue supporting Kali. They accept that there is no simple solution to the challenges ahead, but reaffirm their commitment to raising their son with patience, understanding, and unconditional love.

== Cast ==
- RK Bagatsing as Paolo
- Jane Oineza as Ayla
- John Tyrron Ramos as Kali, Paolo and Ayla's autistic son
- Milton Dionzon as Manong Boni
- Mai Montelibano as the SPED Principal
- Jaden Biel Fernandez as Milo
- Chart Motus as Milo's grandmother
- Jing Torrecampo as a hospital patient's mom
- Mary Jane Quilisadio as Manang Maring
- Mandy Alimon as Hospital Doctor
- Tey Sevilleno as Nanay Marites

== Production ==
Love Child is a co-production of Regal Entertainment with Southern Lantern Studios. It was directed and written by Jonathan Jurilla. This is Jurilla's directorial debut. It was produced by Sonny Calvento and Arden Rod Condez, with Calvento as the screenwriter.

The film was based on Jurilla's own experience on being a father of a son with autism spectrum disorder. It deviates from the usual trope of portraying autistic people as savant who discovers and untapped talent or a film which ends in a "happy ending" according to the director. It depicts the challenges of an autistic child and his family living in Filipino society.

Principal photography for Love Child took place in Jurilla's home province of Negros Occidental particularly in Bacolod, Silay and Talisay.

The parents in the film were depicted by romantic couple Jane Oineza and RK Bagatsing who have described their experience in acting in the film as a "free trial" to parenthood.

== Release ==
Love Child is an entry for the 20th Cinemalaya Philippine Independent Film Festival which ran from August 2 to 11, 2024 at the Ayala Malls Manila Bay.

== Accolades ==
Accolades received by Love Child
Year	Award	Category	Recipient(s)	Result	Ref.
2025	8th EDDYS Awards	Best Picture	Love Child	Pending	
2025	8th EDDYS Awards	Best Actress	Jane Oineza	Pending	
2025	8th EDDYS Awards	Best Director	Jonathan Jurilla	Pending	
2025	8th EDDYS Awards	Best Screenplay	Arden Rod Condez, Arianna Martinez, Angel Benjamin	Pending	
2025	8th EDDYS Awards	Best Editing	John Paul Ponce	Pending	
