= List of Huwag Kang Mangamba episodes =

Huwag Kang Mangamba (International title: Mysterious Destiny / transl. Never Fear) is a Philippine television drama broadcast by Kapamilya Channel, A2Z and TV5. It aired from March 22, 2021, to November 12, 2021, on the channel's Primetime Bida evening block, Jeepney TV, A2Z Primetime, TV5's TodoMax Primetime Singko and worldwide via The Filipino Channel, replacing Ang sa Iyo ay Akin.

== Series overview ==
Season	Episodes	Originally released	
Season	Episodes	First released	Last released
1	168	March 22, 2021	November 12, 2021

- iWantTFC shows two episodes first in advance before its television broadcast.

== Episodes ==
=== Season 1 ===
No. overall	No. in season	Title	Original release date	AGB Nielsen Ratings (NUTAM People)
1	1	"Ang Pagdating"	March 22, 2021	6.0%
2	2	"Hermoso"	March 23, 2021	N/A
3	3	"Paniniwala"	March 24, 2021	8.2%
4	4	"Paghaharap"	March 25, 2021	8.3%
5	5	"Healing Center"	March 26, 2021	7.6%
6	6	"Pamilya Advincula"	March 29, 2021	6.8%
7	7	"Panggagamot"	March 30, 2021	7.4%
8	8	"Liwanag"	March 31, 2021	7.3%
9	9	"Pasasalamat"	April 5, 2021	6.8%
10	10	"Saksi"	April 6, 2021	7.3%
11	11	"Panloloko"	April 7, 2021	7.8%
12	12	"Kapalit"	April 8, 2021	6.8%
13	13	"Kaguluhan"	April 9, 2021	6.2%
14	14	"Bagyo"	April 12, 2021	N/A
15	15	"Kabutihan"	April 13, 2021	N/A
16	16	"Pasasalamat"	April 14, 2021	N/A
17	17	"Barang"	April 15, 2021	9.0%
18	18	"Pakiusap"	April 16, 2021	7.3%
19	19	"Fatima"	April 19, 2021	8.0%
20	20	"Joy"	April 20, 2021	8.5%
21	21	"Kaibigan"	April 21, 2021	7.9%
22	22	"Pagdududa"	April 22, 2021	8.3%
23	23	"Pamilya"	April 23, 2021	N/A
24	24	"Hatian"	April 26, 2021	7.5%
25	25	"Pagtulong"	April 27, 2021	7.6%
26	26	"Tulay"	April 28, 2021	N/A
27	27	"Hiling"	April 29, 2021	8.0%
28	28	"Pagbabago"	April 30, 2021	8.2%
29	29	"Pagtitiwala"	May 3, 2021	N/A
30	30	"Misyon"	May 4, 2021	N/A
31	31	"Pangaral"	May 5, 2021	8.0%
32	32	"Saloobin"	May 6, 2021	7.5%
33	33	"Eva"	May 7, 2021	7.3%
34	34	"Kasunduan"	May 10, 2021	8.1%
35	35	"Paraan"	May 11, 2021	8.3%
36	36	"Selos"	May 12, 2021	7.7%
37	37	"Interview"	May 13, 2021	8.0%
38	38	"Tulungan"	May 14, 2021	7.8%
39	39	"Kasiyahan"	May 17, 2021	8.1%
40	40	"Plano"	May 18, 2021	N/A
41	41	"Damayan"	May 19, 2021	7.5%
42	42	"Petal Shower"	May 20, 2021	N/A
43	43	"Ligtas"	May 21, 2021	7.1%
44	44	"Katiwalian"	May 24, 2021	8.1%
45	45	"Banta"	May 25, 2021	8.1%
46	46	"Loyalty"	May 26, 2021	8.0%
47	47	"Donor"	May 27, 2021	N/A
48	48	"Nakaraan"	May 28, 2021	N/A
49	49	"Sabotahe"	May 31, 2021	7.5%
50	50	"Pag-asa"	June 1, 2021	8.0%
51	51	"Kadugo"	June 2, 2021	7.5%
52	52	"Bistado"	June 3, 2021	7.4%
53	53	"Panalangin"	June 4, 2021	8.1%
54	54	"Pamamaalam"	June 7, 2021	7.6%
55	55	"Proposal"	June 8, 2021	7.4%
56	56	"Hadlang"	June 9, 2021	7.7%
57	57	"Hinala"	June 10, 2021	7.1%
58	58	"Miguel Advincula"	June 11, 2021	7.7%
59	59	"Kaugnayan"	June 14, 2021	6.9%
60	60	"Sambahin"	June 15, 2021	N/A
61	61	"Ebidensya"	June 16, 2021	7.4%
62	62	"Tanong"	June 17, 2021	N/A
63	63	"Desisyon"	June 18, 2021	N/A
64	64	"Kumalas"	June 21, 2021	8.0%
65	65	"Pagkatao"	June 22, 2021	7.7%
66	66	"Kabayaran"	June 23, 2021	N/A
67	67	"Peke"	June 24, 2021	7.2%
68	68	"Sagipin"	June 25, 2021	7.2%
69	69	"Tomas"	June 28, 2021	6.5%
70	70	"Pagtalikod"	June 29, 2021	N/A
71	71	"Isuplong"	June 30, 2021	7.1%
72	72	"Pagpapatawad"	July 1, 2021	N/A
73	73	"Patibong"	July 2, 2021	7.4%
74	74	"Eleksyon"	July 5, 2021	7.1%
75	75	"Koneksyon"	July 6, 2021	7.5%
76	76	"Kapatid"	July 7, 2021	7.3%
77	77	"Patunay"	July 8, 2021	8.0%
78	78	"Kasangga"	July 9, 2021	7.4%
79	79	"Takot"	July 12, 2021	7.0%
80	80	"Pangamba"	July 13, 2021	6.9%
81	81	"Itakas"	July 14, 2021	N/A
82	82	"Ate"	July 15, 2021	8.0%
83	83	"Halaga"	July 16, 2021	N/A
84	84	"Bonding"	July 19, 2021	6.5%
85	85	"Katatagan"	July 20, 2021	7.0%
86	86	"Siraan"	July 21, 2021	6.2%
87	87	"Alagaan"	July 22, 2021	6.2%
88	88	"Rose"	July 23, 2021	6.5%
89	89	"Pagsubok"	July 26, 2021	6.2%
90	90	"Misteryosa"	July 27, 2021	6.1%
91	91	"Balikan"	July 28, 2021	N/A
92	92	"Ipaglaban"	July 29, 2021	7.1%
93	93	"Pagdamay"	July 30, 2021	7.3%
94	94	"Labanan"	August 2, 2021	6.6%
95	95	"Sugod"	August 3, 2021	6.7%
96	96	"Bintang"	August 4, 2021	N/A
97	97	"Imbestiga"	August 5, 2021	7.2%
98	98	"Ala-ala"	August 6, 2021	7.0%
99	99	"Brainwash"	August 9, 2021	6.3%
100	100	"Suhol"	August 10, 2021	7.1%
101	101	"Problemado"	August 11, 2021	6.7%
102	102	"Paglayuin"	August 12, 2021	6.7%
103	103	"Kulong"	August 13, 2021	6.7%
104	104	"Bisita"	August 16, 2021	7.8%
105	105	"Sugal"	August 17, 2021	6.8%
106	106	"Hanapin"	August 18, 2021	N/A
107	107	"Groundbreaking"	August 19, 2021	6.7%
108	108	"Itago"	August 20, 2021	7.3%
109	109	"Planado"	August 23, 2021	7.5%
110	110	"Paghahanap"	August 24, 2021	7.1%
111	111	"Akuin"	August 25, 2021	7.4%
112	112	"Lola Barang"	August 26, 2021	8.0%
113	113	"Mabuo"	August 27, 2021	7.2%
114	114	"Pangungulila"	August 30, 2021	7.5%
115	115	"Reklamo"	August 31, 2021	7.1%
116	116	"Unahan"	September 1, 2021	N/A
117	117	"Huli"	September 2, 2021	8.4%
118	118	"DNA Result"	September 3, 2021	8.5%
119	119	"Ganti"	September 6, 2021	7.6%
120	120	"Krus"	September 7, 2021	7.5%
121	121	"Luksa"	September 8, 2021	7.0%
122	122	"Dasal"	September 9, 2021	7.4%
123	123	"Arestado"	September 10, 2021	7.5%
124	124	"Manipula"	September 13, 2021	6.8%
125	125	"Gabayan"	September 14, 2021	7.2%
126	126	"Manindigan"	September 15, 2021	7.4%
127	127	"Finding Mira"	September 16, 2021	7.3%
128	128	"Pagkawala"	September 17, 2021	6.7%
129	129	"Pananakot"	September 20, 2021	6.3%
130	130	"Eksena"	September 21, 2021	6.2%
131	131	"Makisama"	September 22, 2021	6.3%
132	132	"Tampo"	September 23, 2021	6.6%
133	133	"Peligro"	September 24, 2021	5.8%
134	134	"Kutob"	September 27, 2021	6.1%
135	135	"Konsensya"	September 28, 2021	6.8%
136	136	"Linlang"	September 29, 2021	6.0%
137	137	"Lantaran"	September 30, 2021	7.0%
138	138	"Pagbabalik ni Mira"	October 1, 2021	7.1%
139	139	"Elias"	October 4, 2021	6.9%
140	140	"Policarpio"	October 5, 2021	6.2%
141	141	"Paghahanda"	October 6, 2021	6.8%
142	142	"Tagumpay"	October 7, 2021	6.6%
143	143	"Parusa"	October 8, 2021	7.3%
144	144	"Pagtakas"	October 11, 2021	6.8%
145	145	"Bulilyaso"	October 12, 2021	7.0%
146	146	"Pagtatago"	October 13, 2021	6.4%
147	147	"Pagkabuhay"	October 14, 2021	7.0%
148	148	"Balik Hermoso"	October 15, 2021	7.9%
149	149	"Kwento"	October 18, 2021	7.5%
150	150	"Pakikitungo"	October 19, 2021	7.1%
151	151	"Tampuhan"	October 20, 2021	7.1%
152	152	"Abiso"	October 21, 2021	7.6%
153	153	"Imahe"	October 22, 2021	6.8%
154	154	"Pigilan"	October 25, 2021	7.7%
155	155	"Binyagan"	October 26, 2021	8.0%
156	156	"Hawak"	October 27, 2021	6.8%
157	157	"Pagsagip"	October 28, 2021	7.4%
158	158	"Simon"	October 29, 2021	8.0%
159	159	"Pagbayarin"	November 1, 2021	6.8%
160	160	"Bumawi"	November 2, 2021	8.0%
161	161	"Agatha"	November 3, 2021	8.0%
162	162	"Kampana"	November 4, 2021	7.0%
163	163	"Deborah"	November 5, 2021	7.0%
164	164	"Patunayan"	November 8, 2021	8.0%
165	165	"Ambush"	November 9, 2021	9.0%
166	166	"Sukdulan"	November 10, 2021	8.0%
167	167	"Reunion"	November 11, 2021	8.5%
168	168	"The Healing Finale"	November 12, 2021	8.0%

- This program partially airs nationally on a cable channel/pay TV which normally has a relatively smaller audience compared to free-to-air TV/public broadcasters (GMA, TV5, and PTV among others).
