= Juan and Lily Run for SK =

Upcoming Philippine romantic comedy television series.

- Genre: Teen; Romantic comedy Political
- Directed by: Petersen Vargas
- Starring: Joaquin Arce; Lella Ford
- Country of origin: Philippines
- Original languages: Filipino; English

Production
- Production company: Cornerstone Entertainment

Original release
- Network: iWant

Juan and Lily Run for SK is an upcoming teen romantic comedy directed by Petersen Vargas. It stars Joaquin and Lella Ford.

== Cast ==
- Joaquin Arce as Juan
- Lella Ford as Lily
- Miguel Vergara as Brian
- Krystal Mejes as Via
- Fred Moser as Toby
- Eliza Borromeo as Bianca

=== Guest cast ===
- Jane Oineza as Joey

== Production ==
=== Development and casting ===
On September 3, 2026, the series has been announced as a youth-oriented romantic comedy series labeling it as a Gen Z version of a Romeo & Juliet romantic comedy set inside a youth election with Petersen Vargas as director and Irene Villamor as creative producer. The cast for the series has been announced with Joaquin Arce and Lella Ford as lead together with Miguel Vergara, Krystal Mejes, Fred Moser and Eliza Borromeo. This will be Lella Ford's first acting project.

=== Filming ===
Principal photography commenced on September 10, 2026.

== Release ==
The series is set to release on December 10, 2026.
