= Huwag Kang Mangamba =

Philippine television drama series

- Title card
- Also known as: Mysterious Destiny
- Genre: Christian drama
- Written by: David Diuco; Hazel Madanguit-Uychiat; China Gabriel; Li Candelaria; Andrian Legaspi
- Directed by: Emmanuel Q. Palo; Darnel Joy R. Villaflor; Jerry Lopez Sineneng; Ram Tolentino
- Starring: Andrea Brillantes; Francine Diaz
- Music by: Jessie Lasaten
- Opening theme: "Huwag Kang Mangamba" by Angeline Quinto
- Ending theme: "Paglunas ng Pagkakaisa" by Reese Lansangan (except episode 168)
- Composers: Fr. Manoling Francisco, SJ; Onofre Pagsanghan
- Country of origin: Philippines
- Original language: Filipino
- No. of seasons: 1
- No. of episodes: 168 (list of episodes)

Production
- Executive producers: Carlo Katigbak; Cory Vidanes; Laurenti Dyogi; Roldeo Endrinal; Catherine Abarrondo; Eleanor Martinez
- Producers: Rondel Lindayag; Danica Mae Domingo; Carlina dela Merced
- Production locations: Lumban, Laguna; Pagsanjan, Laguna; Pila, Laguna; Santa Cruz, Laguna; Lipa, Batangas; Angeles, Pampanga; Metro Manila
- Editors: Rommel Malimban; Emerson Torres; Omar Cervantes; John Ryan Bonifacio; Peter Ashley Austria; Dennis Austria; Yeizzel Gatdula; Jessica Rae Viñas; Orveen Calderon
- Production company: Dreamscape Entertainment

Original release
- Network: Kapamilya Channel (Note: The series was also aired on A2Z, Jeepney TV, TV5 and internationally through The Filipino Channel. It is also available on-demand via iWantTFC.)
- Release: March 22 – November 12, 2021

Related
- Mga Anghel na Walang Langit; May Bukas Pa; Agua Bendita; Momay; 100 Days to Heaven; Dahil sa Pag-ibig; Annaliza; Nathaniel; Langit Lupa; Nang Ngumiti ang Langit; Love in 40 Days

Huwag Kang Mangamba (International title: Mysterious Destiny / transl. do not fear) is a Philippine television drama series broadcast Kapamilya Channel. Directed by Emmanuel Q. Palo, Darnel Joy R. Villaflor, Jerry Lopez Sineneng and Ram Tolentino, it stars Andrea Brillantes, Francine Diaz. It premiered on March 22, 2021 on the network's Primetime Bida line up. The series concluded on November 12, 2021 with a total of 168 episodes.

== Plot summary ==
The fictional resort town of Hermoso, in the province of Laguna in the southern region of Luzon, Philippines, is a tourist hotspot for its pristine beaches, hot springs, spas and resorts. The spas were also once a pilgrimage site, attracting thousands nationwide because of the healing waters and conversions.

In past times, the townsfolk were devoted to their faith. But on one night, a fire burnt down the town church, while the parish priest was killed for a golden, bejewelled votive crown. The church is abandoned, and residents forget their devotion to God as they are preoccupied with the prosperity from their tourist sites. A young priest, Father Sebastián “Seb” Tantiangco, is one of the few remaining faithful.

Fátima Cruz is a member of Dakilang Sinag, an armed rebel group in the jungles outside Hermoso. She is targeted by government troops led by Samuel Cordero, and the two meet then fall in love.

Fátima leaves her insurgent life to wed Samuel, and they have a daughter named Joy. Abel, the rebel leader and Fátima’s childhood friend, tries to convince her to return, but their meeting is misunderstood by Samuel, who believes Fátima used him solely for the cause of Dakilang Sinag. Samuel and Fátima’s marriage breaks down when Samuel has a drunken affair with Agatha, a flight stewardess and his ex-girlfriend. The affair produces another daughter for Samuel, whom they name Sofía. Delighted, Agatha informs Fátima, who feels betrayed and tells Samuel she is leaving him. Convinced that Fátima is returning to the rebels, he takes Joy as Fátima and her friend Esther are kidnapped by Abel. At the rebel camp, Fátima discovers she is pregnant. After being raped and tortured by Abel, Fátima flees to the mountains, there giving birth to Mira.

Meanwhile, Samuel enters a common-law marriage with Agatha, convinced that Fátima had left him. Joy grows up with her stepmother and half-sister Sofía. Since Samuel is often away on military missions, the family moves in with Agatha's sister Deborah who claims to have healing powers. Agatha abuses Joy, who also suffers the cruelty of her troubled half-sister, Sofía.

Fátima, who uses the alias Faith Cruz, raises her second child Mira who was born blind. When she hears of Samuel's whereabouts, she leaves 7-year old Mira at an orphanage to find Samuel and tell him what had truly happened. When she sees Samuel with his new family, she decides to take Joy but is murdered by Agatha and Deborah. With Fátima dead, Mira grows up in the orphanage and ten years later, heads for Hermoso to look for her mother. She arrives at the resort town with nothing except her faith in a being named “Bro”, and that night, she is fatally hit by a car. The only witness is the town beggar, Barang, and Mira miraculously comes back to life.

At the same time in another part of town, after a violent fight with Sofía, Joy veers off the road and crashes into a lamppost. She is declared dead on arrival at the hospital as Deborah prays over her. At that moment, Joy comes back to life as well, and the delusional Deborah takes the opportunity to claim this miracle as her own.

The lives of Mira and Joy intertwine, while unaware they are sisters. Joy initially rejects Mira, but gains a renewed faith after reading Fátima’s old diary and Mira's persistence. At this time, a statue of Jesus Christ, whom they call "Bro", comes alive in an apparition and orders them to rebuild the church and restore the town’s faith in God. Joy and Mira join Father Seb, and with a handful of people plan to restore the ruined church. Against all odds and the godless in the community, Mira and Joy follow "Bro", inspiring the people of Hermoso to return to their faith.

Meanwhile, taking advantage of the town's superstitious residents, and anticipating a lucrative source of income, Deborah claims the miracles are due to her healing powers, including Mira's restored sight. Mira instead steadfastly credits "Bro" as the true healer, even as Deborah has a growing fanatical cult calling her “Santa Deborah”.

The town’s powerful Advíncula political family perpetuates the myth of Deborah's power, with its patriarch Simón using her appeal to gain support for his grandson Miguel's mayoral bid. He helps Deborah discredit Mira and Joy through his troll farms. Miguel builds a “healing dome” as a church for Deborah, enabling her to draw more money from her followers. Deborah and Miguel then use the cult as a front for organised crime, such as drugs and arms smuggling.

As more genuine miracles occur around Joy and Mira, Deborah steals credit even as the sisters insist the wonders are all from "Bro". This enrages Deborah, as the girls’ campaign to rebuild the town church competes with her cult activities and “healing dome”. Joy and Mira face more trials together as they deal with diverse people with different morals, beliefs and values. They tell the townspeople that "Bro" speaks to them, and exhorts them to return to God.

When the girls realise they are siblings, they decide to uncover the truth behind their mother’s disappearance. With the help of investigative journalist Miss Eva and their allies in town, they learn the beggar Barang is Virginia Ángeles – Fátima’s mother and their grandmother, as well as Fátima’s death. Though devastated, Barang and the girls overcome more challenges as they seek justice for Fátima, and struggle with the evil gripping Hermoso, all while winning hearts for “Bro”.

As many slowly turn to “Bro”, the town’s transformation from godlessness unfolds into a beautiful story of faith, forgiveness, and redemption.

== Cast and characters ==
Main cast

- Andrea Brillantes as Mira Cruz / Mira C. Cordero
- Francine Diaz as Joy C. Cordero
- Kyle Echarri as Rafael "Rafa" Advincula
- Seth Fedelin as Pio Estopacio

Supporting cast

- Eula Valdez as Deborah "Santa Deborah" Delos Santos
  - Mica Javier as young Deborah
- Sylvia Sanchez as Virginia "Barang" Angeles
  - Gillian Vicencio as young Barang
- Mylene Dizon as Eva Marquez
- Mercedes Cabral as Agatha Delos Santos
- Nonie Buencamino as Simon Advincula
- Diether Ocampo as Samuel Cordero
- RK Bagatsing as Miguel Advincula
- Enchong Dee as Father Sebastián "Seb" Tantiangco
- Angeline Quinto as Darling Sanchez
- Dominic Ochoa as Tomas Estopacio
- Soliman Cruz as Carlito "Caloy" Sanchez
- Matet de Leon as Rebecca Estopacio

Recurring cast

- Alyanna Angeles as Sofia D. Cordero
- Paolo Gumabao as Maximo Delos Santos
- Renz Aguilar as Zacharias "Carrie" Baltazar
- Renshi de Guzman as Hans R. Alvarez
- Margaux Montana as Babygirl "Ghie" Andrade
- Raven Rigor as Mateo Panganiban
- Matty Juniosa as Roberto "Bobby" Magbanua

Guest cast

- Allan Paule as P/Maj.Fidel Alvarez, Chief of Hermoso
- Anne Feo as Diana Rodriguez-Alvarez
- Mark Dionisio as Abel Claverio
- Tess Antonio as Esther Calalang
- Micah Muñoz as Dante Ruiz
- Nieves Manaban as Norma Delos Santos
- Sherry Lara as Luzviminda Cruz
- Joshua Colet as Julius
- Rafael Rosell as Diego Romulo
- Luke Alford as Joaquin Romulo
- Art Acuña as Oscar Tantiangco
- Jane Oineza as Rose Aguilar / Emily Abuel
- Arlene Muhlach as Edna Baltazar
- Marvin Yap as Aldo Baltazar
- Jim Bergado as Bruno Baltazar
- Andrea Del Rosario as Thelma Policarpio
- Richard Quan as Armand Policarpio
- Nash Aguas as Apollo Salvacion
- Vivoree Esclito as Freya Salvador
- Andi Abaya as Micaella "Mikay" Villaluna
- Dimples Romana as Fatima "Faith" Cruz-Cordero / Lucia Angeles
- Christopher de Leon as Elias Arcilla
- Elyson De Dios as Ryan

== Production ==
Filming for the drama started on December 4, 2020, with a lock-in taping set-up.

=== Holy Week special ===
Huwag Kang Mangamba re-aired the first 8 episodes as Huwag Kang Mangamba: The Holy Week Special on Good Friday, April 2, 2021, at 6:00 p.m. on Kapamilya Channel and Kapamilya Online Live and on A2Z on Black Saturday, April 3, 2021, at 2:00 p.m.

=== Casting ===
Ian Veneracion was originally cast to play the role of Elias, but he backed out of this show because of scheduling conflicts for the upcoming new season. Christopher de Leon took over the role as Elias.

== Reruns ==
The show re-aired on Kapamilya Channel's Kapamilya Gold afternoon block, Kapamilya Online Live, and A2Z's Zuper Hapon from January 13 until August 2, 2025, replacing the reruns of Walang Hanggang Paalam and it was replaced by the reruns of Linlang.

This show also had broadcast on Jeepney TV simultaneously with Kapamilya Channel, Kapamilya Online Live, A2Z, and TV5 from March 22 to November 12, 2021. It currently re-airs on Jeepney TV from April 27 to December 18, 2026, and also have delayed broadcast on Kapamilya Online Live.

== Accolades ==
Year	Award	Category	Recipient	Result	Ref.
2021	ContentAsia Awards 2021	Best Drama Series (Telefilm for a Single Asian Market)	Huwag Kang Mangamba	Won	
2021	Asian Academy Creatives Awards 2021	Best Actor in a Supporting Role	Nonie Buencamino	Won	
2021	Asian Academy Creatives Awards 2021	Best Actress in a Supporting Role	Sylvia Sanchez	Won	
2021	The Platinum Stallion Media Awards 2021	Best Drama Actress	Andrea Brillantes	Won	
