= John Estrada =

Filipino actor

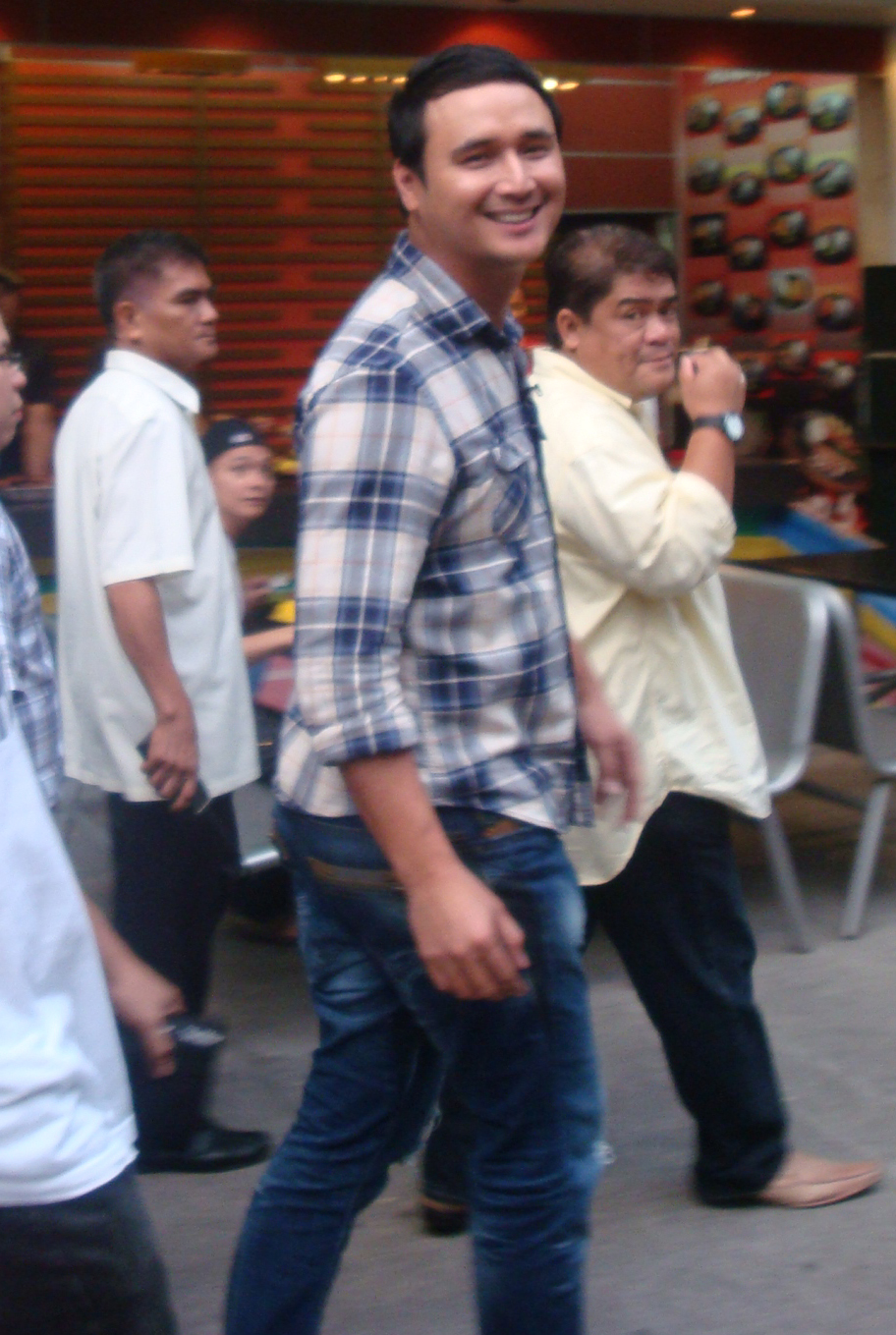
- Estrada in 2011
- Born: John Anthony Siason Estrada; Quezon City, Philippines
- Occupations: Actor; model; TV host; filmmaker
- Years active: 1990–present
- Agent(s): Sparkle (2018–2021); DJRE Entertainment (2018–present)
- Television: ABS-CBN (1990–2018; 2021–present); ALLTV2 (2024–present); GMA Network (2018–2021); TV5 Network (2008–2010; 2021–present)
- Spouses: Janice de Belen (m. 1992; ann. 2004) Priscilla Meirelles (m. 2011; div. 2026)
- Children: 5 (4 with de Belen including Kaila; 1 with Meirelles)

John Anthony Siason Estrada is a Filipino actor, TV host, model and filmmaker who has starred in a number of roles as a leading man, comedian and antagonist. He was a contract actor with ABS-CBN from 1990 to 2018, with GMA Network from 2018 to 2021, and then with ABS-CBN again in 2021. He made a sitcom with TV5 called Everybody Hapi. Estrada is known for presenting two noontime shows for ABS-CBN, MTB and Happy Yipee Yehey!. He portrayed the antagonistic PCpl. Rigor Dimaguiba in Batang Quiapo from 2023 to 2026.

== Early life and background ==
John Anthony Siason Estrada was born on June 13, 1973, in Quezon City, Philippines, and grew up with his family at Isabela, Basilan where his father (Vicente Estrada) was a Municipal Councilor and his mother (Lilia Siason) a public school teacher. At an early age, he was regularly cast in a variety of school plays and presentations, usually taking on the lead roles.

== Acting career ==
He first made his foray in show business as a model, having won Bodyshots Model Search, a competition sponsored by the Fashion Designers Association of the Philippines (FDAP) from nearby Zamboanga City up until his early college years when he moved to Metro Manila at age 16. He studied mass communications for two years at University of the Philippines Diliman but eventually dropped to pursue a career in acting. His name gained further publicity when he married former child actress Janice de Belen who bore him 4 children: Inah (b. 1992), Moira (b. 1993), Kaila (b. 1996), and Yuan (b. 1998).

Estrada became part of the ABS-CBN sitcom Palibhasa Lalake in 1990 and played minor roles in some films produced by Regal Films and Star Cinema. Soon after he shifted from acting to TV hosting via 'Sang Linggo nAPO Sila (1995–1998). His biggest break in showbiz came in 1998 when he headlined the controversial ABS-CBN noontime show Magandang Tanghali Bayan (MTB) with Randy Santiago and Willie Revillame. His hosting job also cost him his marriage with Janice when he was linked to his Magandang Tanghali Bayan co-host Vanessa del Bianco. Janice and Estrada legally separated in 2001. The marriage was officially annulled in 2004.

== Acting later and recent career ==
In 2002, Estrada was chosen to play Boris opposite grand slam actress Lorna Tolentino in the ABS-CBN soap Kay Tagal Kang Hinintay. His foray into dramatic acting did not alienate him from the audiences who are used to see him cracking jokes on noontime TV. He was later named Best Drama Actor in 2003 Star Awards for Television. Soon after, when ABS-CBN decided to reformat MTB following Willie Revillame's termination, Estrada offered to resign from the show so that he could concentrate on acting. He was given another lead role in another ABS-CBN soap Hiram opposite Kris Aquino and Dina Bonnevie in 2004.

However, Estrada did not stick to leading man roles after Hiram. Instead, he tried his hand in doing villain roles in different soap operas on ABS-CBN. He returned to comedy when he accepted the role of Jim in the TV5 former sitcom Everybody Hapi with Long Mejia and Roxanne Guinoo. Due to the sitcom's numerous casting changes, the show was reformatted to Hapi Together with Carla Humphries, Leo Martinez, Callalily lead singer Kean Cipriano and former Everybody Hapi mainstays Nova Villa and Long Mejia. He returned to hosting for P.O.5 after 5 years since he was a former host of defunct ABS-CBN daily variety show, Magandang Tanghali Bayan, with P.O.5 co hosts Wilma Doesnt, Lucy Torres-Gomez, JC De Vera, Kean Cipriano and his best friend Richard "Goma" Gomez. Despite hosting and doing comedy for TV5, the Kapamilya Network still cast him for the inspirational drama Agua Bendita, in which he gained positive reviews. He was given a follow-up drama, Minsan Lang Kita Iibigin where he was reunited for the third time with grandslam actress Lorna Tolentino.

He subsequently gave up his hosting stint in P.O.5 after ABS-CBN commissioned him and Randy Santiago to return to noontime TV hosting thru Happy Yipee Yehey. He also resigned from Hapi Together where his lead role (as Geronimo) was replaced by Joey Marquez who assumed another role similar to Geronimo's character.

In 2014, Estrada starred in the melodrama, Ikaw Lamang where he reunited with Minsan Lang Kita Iibigin co-star Coco Martin as one of the main antagonists turned anti-hero Don Gonzalo Miravalez.

Estrada also earns the unofficial distinction as one of three Philippine actors that appeared as villains in both TV and movie versions of Mars Ravelo's Lastikman, along with Cherie Gil and Danilo Barrios.

In 2018, Estrada transferred to GMA Network after being with ABS-CBN for nearly 27 years, On May 2, he signed an exclusive contract with GMA Artist Center.

On August 23, 2021, Estrada returned to ABS-CBN. He was part of FPJ's Ang Probinsyano as the cunning yet power-hungry warlord Armando Silang. He portrayed one of the main antagonists in FPJ's Batang Quiapo as the ruthless, manipulative and brutal cop Rigor Dimaguiba.

In 2026, Estrada stars in the major family drama series Honor Thy Mother. The show is an unprecedented collaboration between ABS-CBN, GMA Network, and Prime Video.

== Personal life ==
Estrada and Janice de Belen had four children - Inah, Moira, Kaila (born on March 16, 1996), and Yuan. Iggy "Luigi" Boy Muhlach is their eldest from Janice de Belen's previous relationship with actor Aga Muhlach.

Estrada later married his longtime girlfriend Brazilian beauty titlist Priscilla Meirelles with whom he has one daughter, Samantha Anechka . Estrada and Priscilla Meirelles attended Sammanta Anechka's graduation, as class first honor at The British School Manila on June 15, 2024. In July, Estrada confirmed ‘mutual break’ with Meirelles. However, she denied the agreement and felt disheartened, stressed and very divorced. Meirelles confirmed her divorce in a Brazilian court in 2026.

In July 2024, Estrada was hospitalized at the Asian Hospital and Medical Center for an undisclosed illness.

== Acting credits ==
=== Film ===
Key
†	Denotes films that have not yet been released

John Estrada's film credits with year of release, film titles and roles
Year	Title	Role
1990	Lover's Delight	
1991	Pakasalan Mo Ako	Mark
1991	Ipaglaban Mo ako Boy Topak	
1991	Buburahin Kita sa Mundo!	
1992	Boy Praning Utak Pulbura	Eddie
1992	Pretty Boy Hoodlum	
1992	Shotgun Banjo	
1992	Aswang	Jason
1992	Guwapings: The First Adventure	Charlie
1993	Gwapings Dos	Freddie
1993	May Minamahal	Bombit
1994	Hindi Magbabago	Chubby
1994	Buhay ng Buhay ko	Nelson
1995	Araw-araw, gabi-gabi	Jessie
1996	Romano Sagrado: Talim sa Dilim	Dante
1996	Akin Ang Puri	
1996	Radio Romance	Lester Carmona
1996	Milyonaryong Mini	Cosme
1996	Sa Kamay ng Batas	Frankie
1997	Hari ng Yabang	Adelbert
1997	Calvento Files: The Movie	Pinong
1997	Sanggano	Raymond
1998	Ang Babae sa Bintana	Jack's lover
1999	Weder-Weder Lang 'Yan	Dodong
2000	Pera o Bayong (Not da TV)!	Mauricio
2004	Lastikman	Taong Aso
2008	Caregiver	Teddy Gonzales
2009	BFF: Best Friends Forever	Tim/TJ
2009	Villa Estrella	Eddie
2010	Rosario	Jose
2012	Ouija 2	Ka Mano
2013	Must Be... Love	King Espinosa
2013	Boy Golden: Shoot to Kill, the Arturo Porcuna Story	Tony Razon
2014	Trophy Wife	Sammy
2015	Tragic Theater	Fr. Nilo Marcelo
2017	Unexpectedly Yours	Yael Gonzales
2018	I Love You, Hater	Richard
2019	Family History	Jay Roque
2019	The Last Interview: The Mayor Antonio Halili Story	Antonio Halili
2022	Labyu with an Accent	Larry Madlangbayan
2025	In Thy Name	BGen. Narciso Abaya

=== Television ===
Key
†	Denotes shows that have not yet been aired

John Estrada's television credits with year of release, title(s) and role
Year	Title	Role	Ref.
1990–1998	Palibhasa Lalake	Johnny	
1992–1993	Young Love, Sweet Love	Various	
1993	GMA Telesine Specials	Various	
1995	Familia Zaragoza	Sgt. Charlie Rodriguez	
1995–2018; 2021–present	ASAP XP	Himself – performer / host	
1997	Onli In Da Philippines	Rocco	
1997	Wansapanataym: Balete	Mike	
1997	Wansapanataym: Touch of Gold	Steve	
1998	Magandang Tanghali Bayan	Himself / Host	
1999	Richard Loves Lucy	Various	
2001	Kakabakaba	Various	
2002	Kay Tagal Kang Hinintay	Boris Arcangel	
2003	Masayang Tanghali Bayan	Himself / Host	
2003	Ok Fine Whatever		
2003	Ang Tanging Ina	Geronimo	
2004	OK Fine Oh Yes!		
2004	Hiram	Edward Verdadero	
2005	OK Fine Ito Ang Gusto Niyo		
2005	Vietnam Rose	Alexander dela Cerna	
2005	Wowowee	Himself	
2006	Da Adventures of Pedro Penduko	Consehal Lino	
2006	Maalaala Mo Kaya: Switcher	Deo Dador	
2007	Komiks Presents: Pedro Penduko at ang mga Engkantao	Dr. Lazaro	
2007	Maria Flordeluna	Gary Alvarado	
2007	Maalaala Mo Kaya: Burger Stand	Robert Cuevas	
2007	Mars Ravelo's Lastikman	Dr. Jared Evilone / Elemento	
2008	Everybody Hapi	Jim	
2009	May Bukas Pa	Olegario	
2009	Komiks Presents: Mars Ravelo's Nasaan Ka Maruja?	Michael	
2009	Dahil May Isang Ikaw	Daniel Ramirez	
2010	Rod Santiago's Agua Bendita	Dr. Marcial Cristi	
2011	Minsan Lang Kita Iibigin	Col. Joaquin Del Tierro	
2011	Happy, Yipee, Yehey	Host	
2012	Lorenzo's Time	Younger Manuel Montereal	
2012	A Beautiful Affair	Edward Pierro	
2013	Huwag Ka Lang Mawawala	Alejo Apostol	
2014	Ikaw Lamang	Don Gonzalo Miravelez	
2015	Walang Iwanan	Diosdado "Dado" Pascual	
2016	Magpahanggang Wakas	Tristan Lozado	
2017	Maalaala Mo Kaya: Tahanan	Recho	
2017	Maalaala Mo Kaya: Juice	Raul	
2017	Maalaala Mo Kaya: Bandila	Loloy Dando	
2017	The Good Son	Anthony Buenavidez	
2018	Pepito Manaloto	RJ / Romeo	
2018	Victor Magtanggol	Loki / Dr. Mikolai	
2019	Kara Mia	Arthur Lacson	
2019	Magpakailanman: Sagip Buhay ng Kaaway: The Sultan Binjihad Guro and Sgt. Antonio Casilis Story	Binjihad Guro	
2020	Dear Uge: Wish Me Love	Juancho	
2021	John En Ellen	John Kulantong	
2021	Babawiin Ko ang Lahat	Victor Salvador	
2021–2022	FPJ's Ang Probinsyano	Armando Silang	
2023	It's Showtime	Himself / Guest co-host	
2023–2026	FPJ's Batang Quiapo	PCpt. Rigor Dimaguiba	
2025–2026	Wais at Eng-Eng	Wais	
2026	Honor Thy Mother	Ricardo Salvador	

== Accolades ==
Awards and nominations received by John Estrada
Year	Award	Category	Nominated work	Result
2003	17th PMPC Star Awards for TV	Best Drama Actor	Kay Tagal Kang Hinintay	Won
2005	19th PMPC Star Awards for TV	Best Drama Actor	Hiram	Nominated
2008	22nd PMPC Star Awards for TV	Best Comedy Actor	Everybody Hapi	Nominated
2009	6th ENPRESS Golden Screen Awards	Best Supporting Actor in a Comedy, Drama or Musical	Caregiver	Won
2009	57th FAMAS Awards	Best Supporting Actor	Caregiver	Nominated
2009	3rd Gawad Genio Awards	Best Film Actor	Caregiver	Nominated
2011	27th Luna Awards	Best Actor	Caregiver	Nominated
2012	25th Awit Awards	Best Novelty Recording (shared with Rico J. Puno and Randy Santiago)	Nananana	Won
2012	25th Awit Awards	Best Dance Recording (shared with Rico J. Puno and Randy Santiago)	I-swing Mo	Nominated
2014	28th PMPC Star Awards for TV	Best Drama Supporting Actor	Ikaw Lamang	Won
2014	62nd FAMAS Awards	Best Supporting Actor	Boy Golden: Shoot to Kill	Nominated
2015	PMPC Star Awards for Movies	Movie Actor of the Year	Trophy Wife	Nominated
