= Huwag Ka Lang Mawawala =

2013 Philippine television drama series

- Title card
- Also known as: Against All Odds
- Genre: Melodrama; Action; Revenge; Teleserye
- Created by: ABS-CBN Studios
- Developed by: ABS-CBN Studios: Roldeo T. Endrinal; Julie Anne R. Benitez
- Written by: Arlene Tamayo; Danica Mae S. Domingo; David Diuco; Rhoda Sulit; Rhoda Tanyag; Emille Joson (dialogues)
- Directed by: Malu L. Sevilla; Jerry Lopez Sineneng; Claudio "Tots" Sanchez-Mariscal IV
- Creative director: Johnny delos Santos
- Starring: Judy Ann Santos; Sam Milby; KC Concepcion
- Opening theme: "Huwag Ka Lang Mawawala" by Gary Valenciano
- Composer: Ogie Alcasid
- Country of origin: Philippines
- Original languages: Filipino; English
- No. of episodes: 50

Production
- Executive producers: Carlo Katigbak; Cory Vidanes; Laurenti Dyogi; Roldeo Endrinal
- Producers: Cathy Magdael-Abarrando; Ella Garcia; Rondel Lindayag; Reggie Amigo
- Production locations: Metro Manila, Philippines
- Editors: Rommel Malimban; Jeffrey Panlilio
- Running time: 30-45 minutes; Monday - Friday at 21:15 (PST)
- Production company: Dreamscape Entertainment TV

Original release
- Network: ABS-CBN
- Release: June 17 – August 23, 2013

Huwag Ka Lang Mawawala (International title: Against All Odds / transl. Just Don't Get Lost) is a 2013 Philippine television drama melodrama series broadcast by ABS-CBN. Directed by Malu L. Sevilla, Jerry Lopez Sineneng and Claudio "Tots" Sanchez-Mariscal IV, it stars Judy Ann Santos, Sam Milby and KC Concepcion. It aired on the network's Primetime Bida line up and worldwide on TFC from June 17 to August 23, 2013, replacing Ina, Kapatid, Anak and was replaced by Got to Believe.

The series is streaming online on YouTube.

== Overview ==
Anessa Panaligan is a strong woman and a loving daughter who would do everything for the sake of her family. Amidst all the trials that she is facing, Anessa meets and falls in love with Eros Diomedes, a rich young man who turns her life into a nightmare.

== Cast and characters ==
=== Main cast ===
- Judy Ann Santos as Anessa Panaligan-Diomedes / Angela Balaguer
- Sam Milby as Eros Diomedes
- KC Concepcion as Alexis G. Tiotangco

=== Supporting cast ===
- John Estrada as Alejo Apostol
- Tirso Cruz III as Don Romulos Diomedes
- Coney Reyes as Doña Helena Diomedes
- Mylene Dizon as Athena Apostol
- Susan Africa as Demetria Panaligan
- Empress Schuck as Iris Diomedes
- Joseph Marco as Leandros Panaligan

=== Minor and recurring cast ===
- Bryan Termulo as Victor Guevarra
- Matet de Leon as Nancy Guevarra
- Ogie Diaz as Roger Alegria
- Bing Davao as Ernesto Martinez
- Johnny Revilla as Hector Tiotangco
- Cheska Iñigo as Kara Tiotangco
- Lui Manansala as Gloria
- Michael Conan as Bernard
- Marvin Yap as Elmo
- Josh Ivan Morales as Rocky
- Miguel Vergara as Emman "JR" P. Diomedes
- Marco Masa as Peter T. Diomedes

=== Guest cast ===
- AJ Dee as Edgar
- Mico Palanca as Ramon
- Via Antonio as Barbara
- Bernard Palanca as Greg
- Dexie Daulat as Angela
- Hiyasmin Neri as young Maria
- Ron Morales as young Romulos
- Dianne Medina as young Helena
- Sophia Ysm as young Eva

=== Special participation ===
- Amalia Fuentes as Dr. Maria Balaguer
- Gretchen Barretto as Atty. Eva Custodio
- Lito Pimentel as Dario Panaligan

== Reception ==
Huwag Ka Lang Mawawala dominated its 8:30–9:15pm timeslot. Although it moved to a later timeslot to give way for Muling Buksan ang Puso, it still dominated its new timeslot (9:15–10:00pm) and was one of the few primetime shows in the Philippines to increase their television ratings after being moved to a later timeslot.

The series ranked 11th in the Top 15 programs from January to December 2013 based on year round data from Kantar Media Philippines with an average rating of 25.9%.

KANTAR MEDIA NATIONAL TV RATINGS (8:30PM PST / 9:15PM PST)
PILOT EPISODE	FINALE EPISODE	PEAK	AVERAGE	SOURCE
27.1%	32.5%	31.2% (8:30PM PST); 32.5% (9:15PM PST)	25.9%	

== Reruns ==
Reruns of the show's episodes aired first on ABS-CBN as marathon from June 23 to August 25, 2013. It then aired on Jeepney TV from December 12, 2016 to January 18, 2017 (replacing the reruns of Two Wives 2014); April 2 to May 11, 2018 (replacing the reruns of Kambal sa Uma); September 21 to November 6, 2020 (replacing the reruns of Tubig at Langis); March 21 to April 22, 2022 (replacing the reruns of Kadenang Ginto); July 15 to August 16, 2024 (replacing the reruns of Precious Hearts Romances Presents: Pintada); and July 6 to September 11, 2026 (replacing the reruns of Walang Hanggan).

== Cancellation ==
Huwag Ka Lang Mawawala was supposed to be extended due to high ratings and positive feedbacks. Unfortunately, the show's extension is later cancelled due to the combined requests of Koreanovela fans and the supporters of That Winter, the Wind Blows and Santos' disappointments about the timeslot changes, followed by her decision to finish her show immediately to give way for Got to Believe.

== See also ==
- List of programs broadcast by ABS-CBN
- List of ABS-CBN Studios original drama series
- List of programs broadcast by Jeepney TV
