= Krystal Mejes =

Filipino actress

- Born: Crystal Mejes Crooks; July 12, 2008 (age 18); Catbalogan City, Samar, Philippines
- Citizenship: Filipino; Australian
- Occupations: Actress; singer
- Years active: 2015–Present
- Agent: Star Magic (2015-present)
- Known for: Doble Kara, Pinoy Big Brother

Crystal Mejes Crooks also known as Krystal Mejes is a Filipino actress, singer, and model

She began her career as a child actress, appearing in television productions of ABS-CBN, including Doble Kara, Nang Ngumiti ang Langit, and Maalaala Mo Kaya. She later appeared in the television series Lavender Fields and What Lies Beneath. In 2023, she starred in the short film Matapang, for which she received a Best Actress award at the Paris Film Awards.

In 2025, Mejes became a housemate on Pinoy Big Brother: Celebrity Collab Edition 2.0., a collaboration between ABS-CBN and GMA Network. She became one of the most well-loved housemates and finished as the Second Big Placer.

== Early life ==
Mejes has described herself as Proud Waray. Her father is Australian, while her mother is Filipino. According to her, her Australian father, who is a lawyer, left the family when she was six years old. Krystal later said that her desire to pursue acting was partly motivated by her hope of gaining her father’s attention and showing him her accomplishments.

Her interest in acting also developed after watching the ABS-CBN fantasy drama Mutya during her childhood. Inspired by the program, she became interested in performing and eventually pursued opportunities in the entertainment industry. She later moved to Manila to develop her acting career.

== Career ==
Mejes started acting at young age. The first lead acting role she got was Becca (Rebecca "Becca" Suarez / Isabella D. Acosta), the daughter of Julia Montes as 'Sara' and as 'Kara', on the drama series Doble Kara (2015-2017).

Previously, she was starring on A Love to Last (2017) and was known to be playing Amber Salvador on Nang Ngumiti ang Langit (2019). Her other work features include television series; The Haunted (2019) and short-film- Matapang (2022/2023) awarded her Best Actress from the Paris Film Awards.

She starred as Myrtle Hidalgo on Lavender Fields (2024-2025) and mystery series, What Lies Beneath as young Erica.

Mejes became a housemate on Pinoy Big Brother: Celebrity Collab Edition 2.0 in 2025, as the "Wishful Waray ng Samar." Mejes was hailed as the Kapamilya Second Big Placer.

=== Becoming: Fan Meet and Advocacy Concert ===
On September 26, 2026, Mejes held Becoming: Krystal Mejes Fan Meet and Advocacy Concert at the New Frontier Theater in Quezon City. The event was presented as an advocacy concert and fan meet, combining musical performances, fan interactions, and discussions connected to Mejes' advocacy work. The concert was held as part of the celebration of her tenth year in show business.

The event also introduced and highlighted Tala Gives, an outreach initiative associated with Mejes and her supporters. The initiative focuses on community outreach and charitable activities. Mejes described the project as an important part of her personal development and said that her work with Tala Gives had influenced her view of using her platform to create a positive impact.

Tickets for Becoming were sold through TicketNet, with several seating categories offered at the New Frontier Theater. The concert was announced for September 26, with ticket sales beginning in the middle of August. In the days leading up to the concert, all tiers from Balcony to SVIP were reported as sold out by Star Music and ABS-CBN PR

The concert marked Mejes' transition from her television and acting work into a larger live performance setting. Promotional and event coverage described Becoming as an opportunity for audiences to see a more personal side of Mejes through music, performances, fan interactions and advocacy.

== Filmography ==
=== Television ===
Year	Title	Role	Notes
2015–2017	Doble Kara	Rebecca "Becca" Suarez / Isabella D. Acosta	
2017	A Love to Last	Crystal	
2019	Nang Ngumiti ang Langit	Amber Salvador	
2019–2020	The Haunted	Young Aileen Robles	
2024–2025	Lavender Fields	Myrtle Hidalgo	
2025–2026	What Lies Beneath	Young Erica	
2025–2026	Pinoy Big Brother: Celebrity Collab Edition 2.0	Housemate	Second Big Placer
TBA	Juan and Lily Run for SK	Via	

=== Film ===
- Matapang (short film) (Mary Ann)
- Family Matters (2022) (Nina)
