= 2012 in Philippine television =

The following is a list of events affecting Philippine television in 2012. Events listed include television show debuts, finales, cancellations, and channel launches, closures and rebrandings, as well as information about controversies and carriage disputes.

== Events ==
=== January ===
- January 27 – CCP Bobcats wins as Showtime Campus Clash Edition Grand Champion.

=== February ===
- February 4 – Koreen Medina emerged as HYY's My Girl Grand Winner held at the AFP Theater.

=== March ===
- March 5 – TV Patrol celebrated its 25 years of broadcasts.
- March 10 – In Manny Many Prizes Easy Manny Jackpot Round, Joey wins ₱1,000,000.
- March 31
  - Slater Young from Visayas wins season 4 of Pinoy Big Brother, became the show's first male winner.
  - Panghulo National High School was hailed as EB's Pinoy Henyo High Alumni Edition Grand Champion by guessing three words in 2 minutes and 8.68 seconds.

=== April ===
- April 28 – Bacolod Masskara from Bacolod, Negros Occidental wins as Showtime's fifth grand champion (Showtime Inter-Town Edition grand champion) on the noontime TV program, It's Showtime.

=== May ===
- May 6
  - Raymart Santiago, along with Claudine Barretto and his 8-man entourage, assaulted a known journalist and senior citizen, Ramon Tulfo, due to Ramon purportedly using his mobile phone to take photos of Claudine screaming at and humiliating a ground attendant of Cebu Pacific concerning missing luggage which supposedly contained asthma medicine for their friend's children. This occurred within NAIA Terminal 3 in a location not covered by CCTV. Witnesses state that the brawl began when Raymart and his entourage surrounded Tulfo and demanded that he hand over his phone. Ramon refused and the assault commenced. A video of the brawl that was recorded and posted on YouTube clearly shows Raymart choking Tulfo while encouraging his friends to throw punches at him. Claudine can clearly be seen attacking Tulfo as well. The airport guards eventually stopped the attack and escorts Ramon away while Raymart follows alongside screaming obscenities at him. A few days after the incident, Claudine Barretto filed assault and child abuse charges on Ramon Tulfo as they claim that he (Tulfo) initiated the attack. Claudine also states that she has a witness to her claim. The name of the witness was not given and he has not given his account of the incident to anybody but Claudine. The rationale behind the child abuse charges, according to Claudine, comes from the fact(?) that Ramon (allegedly) begins the assault in front of her children, traumatizing them. Upon questioning the ground attendant Claudine was heckling, it was Raymart and their entourage who had initiated the assault.
  - Astroboy was hailed as the Ultimate Talentado in Talentadong Pinoy Season 3, the Battle of the Champions of which were held at Quezon Memorial Circle.
- May 18: Episode of TV5's Sharon: Kasama Mo, Kapatid, Tulfo made an appearance in the Episode title Boys to Men with his brothers Raffy and Erwin.
- May 27
  - Episode of ABS-CBN's Gandang Gabi, Vice!, Tulfo made an appearance as Vice Ganda's guest for interview & sampling of his talent in dancing. After the dance, Ganda gave Tulfo a Gift a Video Camera.
  - Miss Philippines Earth 2012 was held at the Center Stage of SM Mall of Asia in Pasay. Stephany Stefanowitz of Quezon City won the pageant.

=== June ===
- June 2: Paco Catholic School was hailed as EB's Junior Pinoy Henyo 2012 Grand Champion by guessing 8 words.
- June 6: Episode of ABS-CBN's Kris TV, Tulfo made an appearance as Kris Aquino's guest for interview, sampling of his Aikido where he is a Black belter. and a preview in his Eatery along with his son Ramon "Bon" Tulfo, III.
- June 7: Kapuso Network's 5th originating station is GMA Ilocos, which covers Ilocos Norte, Ilocos Sur and Abra following the establishments of GMA Cebu, GMA Davao and GMA Iloilo in 1999 and GMA Dagupan in 2008. On June 25, Balitang Ilokano was launched as its flagship local newscast.
- June 9: Ryzza Mae Dizon from Angeles City, Pampanga was crowned as Little Miss Philippines 2012 on the noontime show, Eat Bulaga!.
- June 23
  - ABS-CBN launched the Philippine version of The X Factor.
  - University of Santo Tomas was hailed as EB's Pinoy Henyo Intercollegiate Edition 2012 Grand Champion by guessing 7 words.

=== July ===
- July 7: 17-year-old Myrtle Sarrosa emerged as the Teen Big Winner of Pinoy Big Brother: Teen Edition 4.
- July 16: Eat Bulaga! Indonesia is the first international franchise in Indonesia.

=== August ===
- August 10: The 6th originating station of Kapuso Network is GMA Bicol, which covers the Bicol Region and on September 17, it launched its flagship local newscast Baretang Bikol.
- August 18 – Kean Cipriano and Enchong Dee wins the 1 million pesos of Kapamilya, Deal or No Deal.

=== September ===
- September 15 – John Edric Ulang from Binangonan, Rizal emerged as Eat Bulaga!'s Mr. Pogi 2012 grand winner.
- September 30 – Sandugo Guardline was hailed as the Ultimate Talentado Kids in Talentadong Pinoy Kids.

=== October ===
- October 11
  - The Far Eastern University Lady Tamaraws clinched the UAAP Season 75 women's basketball title after defeating the De La Salle University Lady Archers 2–0 in game 2 of the best-of-three finals series held at the Smart Araneta Coliseum in Quezon City. This was their 2nd consecutive basketball championship title and also the team to have a perfect 16-0 record.
  - The Ateneo de Manila University Blue Eagles clinched the UAAP Season 75 men's basketball title after defeating the University of Santo Tomas Growling Tigers 2–0 in game 2 of the best-of-three finals series held at the Smart Araneta Coliseum in Quezon City. This was their 5th consecutive basketball championship title.
- October 14: KZ Tandingan wins the first season of The X Factor Philippines.
- October 17: ABS-CBN launches the Christmas song Lumiliwanag ang Mundo sa Kwento ng Pasko, after the news program TV Patrol.
- October 20
  - CHASE is now known as Jack City; the first local general entertainment TV station. Its Jack TV's second counterpart channel Owned by Broadcast Enterprises and Affiliated Media, Inc. and Solar Television Network.
  - Gollayan family of Santiago, Isabela was hailed as Bida Kapamilya Grand Champion on It's Showtime.
- October 21: Pedro Calungsod was canonized in Vatican City, and is the 2nd Filipino saint.
- October 22: Creative Programs launched Jeepney TV.
- October 27
  - Lauren Dyogi announced that there is a triple tie after the results. Anne Curtis/Karylle, Jugs Jugueta/Teddy Corpuz, and Billy Crawford/Vhong Navarro were hailed as the third anniversary champions on It's Showtime.
  - Samaria was hailed as Eat Bulaga Battle of the Bands grand winner.
- October 29: After 42 years and 4 months of its broadcast programming run, NewsWatch aired its final episode with newscasts aired of all editions, making the longest-running newscasts on Philippine television.
- October 30: Talk TV is now known as Solar News Channel; the first local news TV station Owned by Southern Broadcasting Network and Solar Television Network.
- October 31: GEM TV is now known as INC TV; the first local TV station owned by Christian Era Broadcasting Service.

=== November ===
- November 10 – Cool Kids Crew and Michael V. hailed as the winner of Eat Bulaga Kids' Dance Showdown.
- November 15 – Destiny Cable launched AXN, BeTV and DZMM TeleRadyo on their channel line-up.
- November 24 – Melvin Tudtud from Cebu City emerged as Eat Bulaga!'s D'Kilabots: Mr. Pogi, Weh? grand winner.

=== December ===
- December 29 – Janice de Belen wins the 1 million pesos of Kapamilya, Deal or No Deal.

== Premieres ==
Date	Show
January 2	Chef Boy Logro: Kusina Master on GMA 7
January 2	Heartstrings on ABS-CBN 2
January 9	Rated Korina on DZMM TeleRadyo
January 9	Hataw Balita Newsbreak on UNTV 37
January 16	Legacy on GMA 7
January 16	Walang Hanggan on ABS-CBN 2
January 19	Ms. M Confidential on DZMM TeleRadyo
January 23	Sailor Moon on ABS-CBN 2
January 23	Naruto: Shippuden season 4 on ABS-CBN 2
January 23	Precious Hearts Romances Presents: Lumayo Ka Man Sa Akin on ABS-CBN 2
January 23	5 Girls and a Dad on Net 25
January 23	City Hunter on ABS-CBN 2
January 23	Without a Trace season 4 on Fox Channel Philippines
January 29	iBilib on GMA 7
January 29	Spider Man on ABS-CBN 2
January 30	Mundo Man ay Magunaw on ABS-CBN 2
January 30	Kapamilya Blockbusters (weekday edition) on ABS-CBN 2
January 30	E-Boy on ABS-CBN 2
February 2	Insider on TV5/AksyonTV 41
February 4	Oka2kat on ABS-CBN 2
February 4	Spooky Valentine on GMA 7
February 4	Showbiz Inside Report on ABS-CBN 2
February 4	Kapamilya Blockbusters (Saturday edition) on ABS-CBN 2
February 6	Good Morning Club on TV5/AksyonTV 41
February 6	Broken Vow on GMA 7
February 6	Alice Bungisngis and Her Wonder Walis on GMA 7
February 6	Biritera on GMA 7
February 9	Smash on 2nd Avenue
February 12	The Biggest Game Show in the World Asia on TV5
February 12	Toink on TV5
February 13	The Good Daughter on GMA 7
February 13	My Beloved on GMA 7
February 13	Valiente on TV5
February 15	America's Next Great Restaurant on 2nd Avenue
February 19	Kapitan Awesome on TV5
February 19	Luv U on ABS-CBN 2
February 20	It Started with a Kiss on GMA 7
February 20	Tom and Jerry Tales on GMA 7
February 20	Nandito Ako on TV5
February 20	Dr. Love: Always and Forever on DZMM TeleRadyo
February 20	Pilipinas News on TV5/AksyonTV 41
February 20	Super Sine Prime on TV5
February 24	Without a Trace season 5 on Fox Channel Philippines
February 25	Kapamilya, Deal or No Deal (season 4) on ABS-CBN 2
February 26	Sarah G. Live on ABS-CBN 2
February 27	Felina: Prinsesa ng mga Pusa on TV5
February 27	Iris on GMA 7
February 27	Isang Dakot na Luha on TV5
February 28	A Blow to the Heart on Studio 23
March 1	Solar Headlines on Talk TV
March 3	Video Incredible on TV5
March 5	Hiram na Puso on GMA 7
March 5	Wako Wako on ABS-CBN 2
March 12	Dahil sa Pag-ibig on ABS-CBN 2
March 14	Up All Night on 2nd Avenue
March 25	Project Runway Philippines season 3 on ETC
March 26	A Woman's Word on Telenovela Channel
March 29	Without a Trace season 6 on Fox Channel Philippines
April 8	Sunday Funday on TV5
April 15	Extreme Makeover: Home Edition Philippines on TV5
April 16	Kung Ako'y Iiwan Mo on ABS-CBN 2
April 16	Princess and I on ABS-CBN 2
April 16	Dream High on ABS-CBN 2
April 23	Cooking Kumares on TV5
April 23	In da Loop on ABS-CBN 2 and CgeTV
April 24	Without a Trace season 7 on Fox Channel Philippines
May 5	Sine Sabado on GMA News TV 11
May 6	Tweets for My Sweet on GMA 7
May 6	Sunday Screening on GMA News TV 11
May 7	Aryana on ABS-CBN 2
May 7	Chuno: The Slave Hunters on GMA 7
May 7	Love Spell on Telenovela Channel
May 7	Big Love on Telenovela Channel
May 13	Pinoy Adventures on GMA 7
May 14	White Lies on TV5
May 14	Love You a Thousand Times on TV5
May 14	It Started with a Kiss 2 on GMA 7
May 14	Pink Lipstick on TV5
May 14	Sharon: Kasama Mo, Kapatid on TV5
May 20	Pare & Pare on GMA 7
May 21	Luna Blanca on GMA 7
May 21	Ugly Young-Ae on Fox Filipino
May 28	Cooking with the Stars on GMA 7
May 28	Pokémon the Series: Diamond and Pearl on GMA 7
May 28	Dinosaur King on ABS-CBN 2
May 28	Precious Hearts Romances Presents: Hiyas on ABS-CBN 2
May 28	ER season 1 on Fox Channel Philippines
June 4	Kasalanan Bang Ibigin Ka? on GMA 7
June 4	Makapiling Kang Muli on GMA 7
June 11	Mars on GMA News TV 11
June 11	One True Love on GMA 7
June 11	@ANCAlerts on ANC
June 11	My Daddy Dearest on GMA 7
June 11	Runaway on TV5
June 12	The Lying Game on ETC
June 17	Game 'N Go on TV5
June 17	Together Forever on GMA 7
June 18	Faithfully on GMA 7
June 18	Lie To Me on GMA 7
June 18	Solar Network News on Talk TV
June 23	I-Shine Talent Camp (season 1) on ABS-CBN 2
June 23	The X Factor Philippines season 1 on ABS-CBN 2
June 25	Balitang Ilokano on GMA Ilocos
June 30	Mata ng Agila Weekend on Net 25
July 2	Gash Bell on ABS-CBN 2
July 2	Yu-Gi-Oh! 5D's on ABS-CBN 2
July 2	Lorenzo's Time on ABS-CBN 2
July 2	Metro One on PTV 4
July 2	News @ 1 on PTV 4
July 2	News @ 6 on PTV 4
July 2	PTV Sports on PTV 4
July 2	NewsLife on PTV 4
July 2	PTV Newsbreak on PTV 4
July 2	ER season 2 on Fox Channel Philippines
July 7	The Weekend News on PTV 4
July 9	Two Wives on ABS-CBN 2
July 9	Be Careful with My Heart on ABS-CBN 2
July 9	Hindi Ka na Mag-iisa on GMA 7
July 9	Kahit Puso'y Masugatan on ABS-CBN 2
July 9	City Hunter Returns on ABS-CBN 2
July 15	Agri Tayo Dito on All ABS-CBN regional channels (produced by ABS-CBN TV-4 Davao)
July 16	Angelito: Ang Bagong Yugto on ABS-CBN 2
July 16	Precious Hearts Romances Presents: Pintada on ABS-CBN 2
July 16	Solar Nightly News on Talk TV
July 17	Logan Live on DZMM TeleRadyo
July 22	Jollitown (season 5) on ABS-CBN 2
July 22	Gag U! on Studio 23
July 23	Inside Protege on GMA 7
July 24	The World According to Paris on ETC
July 28	Drop Dead Diva on GMA News TV 11
July 28	Lokomoko U Ang Kulit! on TV5
July 29	Adventure Time on TV5
July 29	Third Eye on TV5
July 29	Protégé: The Battle for the Big Artista Break on GMA 7
July 29	Pregnant in Heels on 2nd Avenue
July 30	Enchanted Garden on TV5
July 30	Artista Academy on TV5
July 30	Lee San: The Wind of the Palace on GMA 7
August 1	ER season 3 on Fox Channel Philippines
August 4	Ang Latest on TV5
August 4	Ben 10: Ultimate Alien on TV5
August 4	Untold Stories on TV5
August 4	OA with Onse and Alex on DZMM TeleRadyo
August 5	H.O.T. TV: Hindi Ordinaryong Tsismis on GMA 7
August 11	Pilipinas News Weekend on TV5/AksyonTV 41
August 13	Moon Embracing the Sun on GMA 7
August 13	Reaksyon on TV5/AksyonTV 41
August 13	Manila sa Umaga on AksyonTV 41
August 20	Smile, Dong Hae on GMA 7
August 25	Reaksyon Weekend on TV5/AksyonTV 41
August 27	Angel's Temptation on GMA 7
August 27	UNTV News on UNTV 37
August 31	ER season 4 on Fox Channel Philippines
September 1	The Blue Planet on GMA News TV 11
September 3	Sana ay Ikaw na Nga on GMA 7
September 3	Trabaho Lang! on AksyonTV 41
September 5	The Next on ETC
September 10	Aso ni San Roque on GMA 7
September 10	Panahon.TV on PTV 4
September 10	Slayers Revolution on ABS-CBN 2
September 10	Equator Man on ABS-CBN 2
September 13	Survivor: Philippines on GMA News TV 11
September 13	The X Factor season 2 on Studio 23
September 15	Kapuso Sine Siesta on GMA 7
September 16	Pepito Manaloto: Ang Tunay na Kuwento on GMA 7
September 16	ETC HQ on ETC
September 16	Marvel Knights on ABS-CBN 2
September 17	Baretang Bikol on GMA Bicol
September 20	Hamon ng Kalikasan on GMA News TV 11
September 22	Saturday Blockbuster on TV5
September 23	Sunday Blockbuster on TV5
October 1	Nura: Rise of the Yokai Clan on ABS-CBN 2
October 1	Solar Daybreak on Talk TV
October 1	Solar Newsday on Talk TV
October 2	ER season 5 on Fox Channel Philippines
October 6	Sarap Diva on GMA 7
October 8	Magdalena on GMA 7
October 8	Ina, Kapatid, Anak on ABS-CBN 2
October 8	Coffee Prince on GMA 7
October 14	The Million Peso Money Drop on TV5
October 15	Heroman on ABS-CBN 2
October 16	Beauty and the Beast on ETC
October 20	Life in the Undergrowth on GMA News TV 11
October 22	Kape at Balita (2nd incarnation) on GMA News TV 11
October 22	Emily Owens, M.D. on ETC
October 22	Dogs in the City on 2nd Avenue
October 22	Cielo de Angelina on GMA 7
October 22	Friends season 1 on Fox Channel Philippines
October 27	Extra Challenge (2nd incarnation) on GMA 7
October 27	Kapuso Movie Night: Pinoy Flicks on GMA 7
October 27	Kapuso Movie Night: Asian Kicks on GMA 7
October 29	Yesterday's Bride on GMA 7
October 29	Secret Love: Sungkyunkwan Scandal on ABS-CBN 2
October 29	Temptation of Wife on GMA 7
October 29	A Beautiful Affair on ABS-CBN 2
October 29	The Amazing Race season 1 on TV5
October 30	Solar Network News on ETC (RPN 9)
October 30	Solar Headlines on ETC (RPN 9)
October 31	CMV By Request on INCTV 49
October 31	Gabay sa Mabuting Asal on INCTV 49
October 31	Let's Talk on INCTV 49
October 31	Lingap sa Mamamayan on INCTV 49
October 31	Paninindigan on INCTV 49
October 31	Taga Rito Kami on INCTV 49
November 1	ER season 6 on Fox Channel Philippines
November 5	Gintama season 2 on ABS-CBN 2
November 5	Precious Hearts Romances Presents: Paraiso on ABS-CBN 2
November 5	Paroa: Ang Kuwento ni Mariposa on GMA 7
November 11	Arrow on Jack TV/Jack City
November 12	Nay-1-1 on GMA 7
November 12	One Piece on GMA 7
November 12	Detective Conan on GMA 7
November 12	MasterChef Pinoy Edition on ABS-CBN 2
November 17	Celebrity Bluff on GMA 7
November 17	Magpakailanman (2nd incarnation) on GMA 7
November 17	Watta Job on GMA 7
November 19	A Gentleman's Dignity on ABS-CBN 2
November 19	The Princess' Man on GMA 7
November 19	Jake and the Never Land Pirates on TV5
November 22	Friends season 2 on Fox Channel Philippines
November 26	Pahiram ng Sandali on GMA 7
November 26	Legal Help Desk on Solar News Channel
November 27	MedTalk Health Talk on Solar News Channel
November 28	News.PH on Solar News Channel
November 29	Elections 2013 on Solar News Channel
November 30	News Café on Solar News Channel
December 3	Bistado on ABS-CBN 2
December 3	Solar Sports Desk on Solar News Channel
December 3	ER season 7 on Fox Channel Philippines
December 4	Engkwentro on ABS-CBN 2
December 5	Saklolo on ABS-CBN 2
December 6	Demandahan on ABS-CBN 2
December 7	Hiwaga on ABS-CBN 2
December 10	Animazing Tales on ABS-CBN 2
December 16	Teen Gen on GMA 7
December 17	Giant on TV5
December 17	Letters & Music on Net 25
December 17	Taumbahay on Net 25
December 17	Bagong Umaga, Bagong Balita on ABS-CBN TV-32 Dagupan
December 17	MMK Klasiks on ABS-CBN 2
December 22	Tagalog Action Movie on TV5
December 23	Sunday Blockbuster on TV5
December 25	Friends season 3 on Fox Channel Philippines

=== Unknown Dates ===
- March: Fish Hooks on TV5
- April: Imagination Movers on TV5
- September: I Am Meg on ETC

=== Unknown ===
- Chef vs. Mom on TV5
- Kung May Hirap, May Ginhawa on TV5
- News5 Imbestigasyon on TV5
- Presinto 5 on TV5
- Take Out on TV5
- Adventure Time on TV5
- Ben 10: Alien Force on TV5
- Codename: Kids Next Door on TV5
- Courage the Cowardly Dog on TV5
- The Secret Saturdays on TV5
- A.T.O.M. on Studio 23
- Back at the Barnyard on Studio 23
- Blue Dragon on Studio 23
- Flashforward on Studio 23
- Heartstrings on Studio 23
- Hitman Reborn! on Studio 23
- I Got It! on Studio 23
- Justice League on Studio 23
- Kirarin Revolution on Studio 23
- Marcelino Pan y Vino on Studio 23
- Perfect Match on Studio 23
- Pucca on Studio 23
- Power Rangers Samurai on Studio 23
- Robin Hood on Studio 23
- Rocko's Modern Life on Studio 23
- Snow White on Studio 23
- W.I.T.C.H. on Studio 23
- X-Men on Studio 23
- Agrikultura ETC on PTV 4
- Borderless Adventure on PTV 4
- Buhay Pinoy on PTV 4
- CameraGeekTV: Pinoy Best Shot on PTV 4
- I-Connect: Balitang Social Media on PTV 4
- Pinoy US Cops: Ride Along on PTV 4
- PTV Special Forum on PTV 4
- Puso ng Bayan PCSO Caravan on PTV 4
- Sa Likod ng Istorya on PTV 4
- Show Up: Ang Bagong Game Show ng Bayan on PTV 4
- The Veronica Chronicles on PTV 4
- What I See on Solar News Channel
- Chill Spot on ETC
- Mega Young Designers Competition on ETC
- Be Alive on GMA News TV 11
- Cinema Klasika on GMA News TV 11
- Design Para sa Lahat on GMA News TV 11
- Filipknow on GMA News TV 11
- Home Base on GMA News TV 11
- Life Giver on GMA News TV 11
- Pisobilities on GMA News TV 11
- Road Trip (2nd incarnation) on GMA News TV 11
- Sarap to Heart on GMA News TV 11
- SME GO! Powered by Go Negosyo on GMA News TV 11
- Sports Pilipinas on GMA News TV 11
- The Healthy Life on GMA News TV 11
- This Is My Story, This Is My Song on GMA News TV 11
- Turbo Zone on GMA News TV 11
- Huntahan on UNTV 37
- Pulis @ Ur Serbis Reloaded on UNTV 37
- ArTalk: Beyond Entertainment on Net 25
- Destination Philippines on Net 25
- Exclusive on Net 25
- Investigated: False on Net 25
- My Life on Net 25
- Sessions Presents on Net 25
- Truth Uncovered on Net 25
- Ignite Gospel Musical Festival on Light TV 33
- Lifegiver on Light TV 33
- Pisobilities on Light TV 33
- Road Trip (2nd incarnation) on Light TV 33
- Solemn Sessions on Light TV 33
- This Is My Story, This Is My Song on Light TV 33

== Returning or renamed programs ==
Show	Last aired	Retitled as/Season/Notes	Channel	Return date
American Idol	2011 (GMA News TV)	Same (season 11)	ETC	January 18
!Oka Tokat	2002	Oka2kat	ABS-CBN	February 4
Showtime	2012	It's Showtime	ABS-CBN	February 6
Philippine Basketball Association	2012 (season 37: "Philippine Cup")	Same (season 37: "Commissioner's Cup")	AKTV on IBC	February 10
Dr. Love Music Show	2012	Dr. Love: Always and Forever	DZMM TeleRadyo	February 20
Kapamilya, Deal or No Deal	2009	Same (season 4)	ABS-CBN	February 25
Shakey's V-League	2011 (NBN; season 8: "SEA Club Invitational")	Same (season 9: "1st Conference")	AKTV on IBC	April 24
Philippine Basketball Association	2012 (season 37: "Commissioner's Cup")	Same (season 37: "Governors' Cup")	AKTV on IBC	May 20
National Collegiate Athletic Association	2012 (Studio 23)	Same (season 88)	AKTV on IBC	June 23
Who Wants to Be a Millionaire?	2012	Same (season 9)	TV5	July 1
University Athletic Association of the Philippines	2012	Same (season 75)	Studio 23	July 14
Jollitown	2011	Same (season 5)	ABS-CBN	July 22
Protégé	2011	Same (season 2)	GMA	July 23
Shakey's V-League	2012 (season 9: "1st Conference")	Same (season 9: "Open Conference")	AKTV on IBC	August 19
Del Monte Kitchenomics	2011 (GMA News TV)	Same	GMA	September 1
Sana ay Ikaw na Nga	2003	Same (2012)	GMA	September 3
Philippine Basketball Association	2012 (season 37: "Governors' Cup")	Same (season 38: "Philippine Cup")	AKTV on IBC	September 30
Metal Fight Beyblade	2010	Same	ABS-CBN	October 1
New Girl	2012	Same (season 2)	ETC	October 3
The Vampire Diaries	2012	Same (season 4)	ETC	October 16
Kape at Balita	1993 (GMA)	Same (2nd incarnation)	GMA News TV	October 22
Extra Challenge	2006	Same (2nd incarnation)	GMA	October 27
Ang Iglesia ni Cristo	2012 (GEM TV)	Same	INC TV	October 31
Ang Pagbubunyag	2012 (GEM TV)	Same	INC TV	October 31
Ang Tamang Daan	2012 (GEM TV)	Same	INC TV	October 31
INC & the Bible	2012 (GEM TV)	Same	INC TV	October 31
Pasugo	2012 (GEM TV)	Same	INC TV	October 31
National Basketball Association	2012	Same (2012–13 season)	ABS-CBN / Studio 23 / Basketball TV / NBA Premium TV	October 31
Kapag nasa Katwiran, Ipaglaban Mo!	2000 (RPN)	Same	GMA News TV	November 10
Magpakailanman	2007	Same (2nd incarnation)	GMA	November 17
Hitman Reborn!	2011	Same (season 4)	ABS-CBN	November 19
Road Trip	2005 (RPN)	Same (2nd incarnation)	GMA News TV / Light TV	Unknown

== Programs transferring networks ==
Date	Show	No. of seasons	Moved from	Moved to
January 16	Walang Hanggan	—N/a	GMA (as the original 2003 TV series)	ABS-CBN (as a remake)
January 19	American Idol	11	GMA News TV	ETC
January 20	Sailor Moon	—N/a	ABC (now TV5)	ABS-CBN
January 21	Ben 10: Alien Force	—N/a	Solar TV (now Solar News Channel)	TV5
January 28	Go, Diego, Go!	—N/a	TV5 (as English Audio)	ABS-CBN (as Tagalog Audio)
January 28	The Adventures of Jimmy Neutron: Boy Genius	—N/a	Studio 23 / TV5	ABS-CBN
February 13	Valiente	—N/a	ABS-CBN / GMA (as the original 1992 TV series)	TV5 (as a remake)
February 20	It Started with a Kiss	—N/a	ABS-CBN	GMA
April 24	Shakey's V-League	9	NBN (now PTV)	AKTV on IBC
May 14	They Kiss Again	—N/a	ABS-CBN	GMA (as It Started with a Kiss 2)
June 23	I-Shine Talent Camp	—N/a	GMA	ABS-CBN
June 23	National Collegiate Athletic Association	88	Studio 23	AKTV on IBC
July 9	Marimar	—N/a	RPN / GMA / Q (now GMA News TV)	Telenovela Channel
August 11	Bitag	—N/a	TV5	PTV
September 1	Del Monte Kitchenomics	—N/a	GMA News TV	GMA
October 22	Kape at Balita	—N/a	GMA	GMA News TV
November 10	Kapag nasa Katwiran, Ipaglaban Mo!	—N/a	RPN (now Solar News Channel)	GMA News TV
Unknown	El Tigre: The Adventures of Manny Rivera	—N/a	TV5	ABS-CBN
Unknown	Road Trip	—N/a	RPN (now Solar News Channel)	GMA News TV / Light TV

== Finales ==
- January 6:
  - Fairy Tail season 1 (GMA 7)
  - Hataw Balita News Update (UNTV 37)
- January 13:
  - Amaya (GMA 7)
  - Nasaan Ka, Elisa? (ABS-CBN 2)
- January 20:
  - Inazuma Eleven (ABS-CBN 2)
  - SpongeBob SquarePants (ABS-CBN 2)
  - Reputasyon (ABS-CBN 2)
  - My Binondo Girl (ABS-CBN 2)
  - Urban Zone (ABS-CBN 2)
  - Without a Trace season 3 (Fox Channel Philippines)
- January 21: El Tigre: The Adventures of Manny Rivera (ABS-CBN 2)
- January 22:
  - Iron Man (ABS-CBN 2)
  - Power Rangers RPM (ABS-CBN 2)
- January 27:
  - Gellicious (TV5)
  - Heartstrings (ABS-CBN 2)
  - Ikaw ay Pag-Ibig (ABS-CBN 2)
- January 28:
  - Showtime (ABS-CBN 2)
  - Entertainment Live (ABS-CBN 2)
  - Three Brothers (ABS-CBN 2)
- February 3:
  - Sapul sa Singko (TV5/AksyonTV 41)
  - Kumare Klub (TV5)
  - Kung Aagawin Mo ang Langit (GMA 7)
  - Daldalita (GMA 7)
  - Munting Heredera (GMA 7)
- February 4:
  - Happy Yipee Yehey! (ABS-CBN 2)
  - Hey It's Saberdey! (TV5)
  - Magic? Bagsik! (TV5)
- February 10:
  - Ikaw Lang ang Mamahalin (GMA 7)
  - Survivor Philippines: Celebrity Doubles Showdown (GMA 7)
  - Glamorosa (TV5)
- February 11: Real Confessions (TV5)
- February 12:
  - Bagets: Just Got Lucky (TV5)
  - Growing Up (ABS-CBN 2)
- February 17:
  - P. S. I Love You (TV5)
  - Dr. Love Music Show (DZMM TeleRadyo)
  - Aksyon JournalisMO (TV5/AksyonTV 41)
  - Love You (GMA 7)
  - Hunter × Hunter (GMA 7)
- February 18: Junior MasterChef Pinoy Edition (ABS-CBN 2)
- February 23: Without a Trace season 4 (Fox Channel Philippines)
- February 25: Spooky Valentine (GMA 7)
- February 26/October 7: Who Wants to Be a Millionaire? (TV5)
- February 29: UAAP Season 74 Men's and Women's volleyball tournament (Studio 23)
- March 2:
  - Kokak (GMA 7)
  - Maria la del Barrio (ABS-CBN 2)
- March 9: Budoy (ABS-CBN 2)
- March 17: Special Agent Oso (TV5)
- March 23:
  - Nandito Ako (TV5)
  - Passion (Telenovela Channel)
- March 25: Pepito Manaloto (GMA 7)
- March 28: Without a Trace season 5 (Fox Channel Philippines)
- March 31: Pinoy Big Brother: Unlimited (ABS-CBN 2)
- April 13:
  - Angelito: Batang Ama (ABS-CBN 2)
  - E-Boy (ABS-CBN 2)
  - City Hunter (ABS-CBN 2)
- April 22/July 22: Super Sine Prime (Sunday edition) (TV5)
- April 23: Without a Trace season 6 (Fox Channel Philippines)
- April 28: Regal Shocker (TV5)
- May 3: Iris (GMA 7)
- May 4:
  - Precious Hearts Romances Presents: Lumayo Ka Man Sa Akin (ABS-CBN 2)
  - La Madrastra (Telenovela Channel)
  - The Two Sides of Ana (Telenovela Channel)
- May 5: Oka2kat (ABS-CBN 2)
- May 11:
  - Balitaang Tapat (TV5/AksyonTV 41)
  - It Started with a Kiss (GMA 7)
- May 13:
  - The Biggest Game Show in the World Asia (TV5)
  - Toink (TV5)
  - Hannah Montana (TV5)
  - Project Runway Philippines season 3 (ETC)
- May 15: The Secret Circle (ETC)
- May 18: Biritera (GMA 7)
- May 24: American Idol season 11 (ETC)
- May 25:
  - Sailor Moon (ABS-CBN 2)
  - Wako Wako (ABS-CBN 2)
  - Felina: Prinsesa ng mga Pusa (TV5)
  - Without a Trace season 7 (Fox Channel Philippines)
  - Jackie Chan Adventures (GMA 7)
- May 26: Us Girls (Studio 23)
- May 30: On Call: Serbisyong Totoo. Ngayon. (GMA News TV 11)
- June 1:
  - The Good Daughter (GMA 7)
  - Legacy (GMA 7)
- June 8:
  - Alice Bungisngis and Her Wonder Walis (GMA 7)
  - My Beloved (GMA 7)
- June 10:
  - Sunday Funday (TV5)
  - Reel Love Presents Tween Hearts (GMA 7)
  - 2012 Shakey's V-League 1st Conference (IBC 13)
- June 15:
  - Dream High (ABS-CBN 2)
  - Isang Dakot na Luha (TV5)
  - Broken Vow (GMA 7)
  - Dong Yi (GMA 7)
- June 17: Extreme Makeover: Home Edition Philippines (TV5)
- June 24: Eagle News Weekend Edition (Net 25)
- June 29:
  - Quickfire (GMA News TV 11)
  - The Morning Show (3rd incarnation) (PTV 4)
  - Teledyaryo (PTV 4)
  - Teledyaryo Sports (PTV 4)
  - Cooking Kumares (TV5)
  - Valiente (TV5)
  - Naruto: Shippuden season 4 (ABS-CBN 2)
  - Dahil sa Pag-ibig (ABS-CBN 2)
  - ER season 1 (Fox Channel Philippines)
- July 1: Teledyaryo News Bulletin (PTV 4)
- July 6:
  - Hiram na Puso (GMA 7)
  - In the Name of Love (Telenovela Channel)
  - Kapamilya Blockbusters (weekday edition) (ABS-CBN 2)
- July 7:
  - Pinoy Big Brother: Teen Edition 4 (ABS-CBN 2)
  - Just for Laughs Gags (Saturday edition) (GMA 7)
- July 13:
  - Kapuso Movie Festival (weekday edition) (GMA 7)
  - Mundo Man ay Magunaw (ABS-CBN 2)
  - Precious Hearts Romances Presents: Hiyas (ABS-CBN 2)
- July 14: Ms. M Confidential (DZMM TeleRadyo)
- July 22: Lokomoko (TV5)
- July 28:
  - I-Shine Talent Camp (season 1) (ABS-CBN 2)
  - Paparazzi Showbiz Exposed (TV5)
  - Untold Stories Mula sa Face to Face (TV5)
  - Super Sine Prime (Saturday edition) (TV5)
  - Showbiz Extra (DZMM TeleRadyo)
- July 29: Showbiz Central (GMA 7)
- July 30: Wanted (TV5/AksyonTV 41)
- July 31:
  - Journo (TV5/AksyonTV 41)
  - ER season 2 (Fox Channel Philippines)
- August 1: Anggulo (TV5/AksyonTV 41)
- August 2: Insider (TV5/AksyonTV 41)
- August 3:
  - Iba-Balita Ngayon (Studio 23)
  - Bitag (TV5/AksyonTV 41)
  - Juicy! (TV5)
- August 4:
  - My Chubby World (GMA 7)
  - Tutok Tulfo (TV5/AksyonTV 41)
  - Aksyon Sabado (TV5/AksyonTV 41)
- August 5:
  - Alagang Kapatid (TV5/AksyonTV 41)
  - USI: Under Special Investigation (TV5/AksyonTV 41)
  - Aksyon Linggo (TV5/AksyonTV 41)
- August 10:
  - Andar ng mga Balita (AksyonTV 41)
  - It Started with a Kiss 2 (GMA 7)
- August 12: Pare & Pare (GMA 7)
- August 15: The Glee Project (ETC/Jack TV)
- August 17: My Daddy Dearest (GMA 7)
- August 19: Tweets for My Sweet (GMA 7)
- August 23: Lie to Me (GMA 7)
- August 24:
  - 5 Girls and a Dad (Net 25)
  - Fastbreak News (UNTV 37)
- August 30:
  - One Tree Hill (ETC)
  - ER season 3 (Fox Channel Philippines)
- August 31: Kasalanan Bang Ibigin Ka? (GMA 7)
- September 7:
  - Makapiling Kang Muli (GMA 7)
  - Dobol B sa News TV (GMA News TV 11)
  - Gash Bell (ABS-CBN 2)
  - City Hunter Returns (ABS-CBN 2)
- September 8:
  - The Jose and Wally Show Starring Vic Sotto (TV5)
  - Kapamilya Blockbusters (Saturday edition) (ABS-CBN 2)
- September 9:
  - Together Forever (GMA 7)
  - Spider Man (ABS-CBN 2)
- September 11: The World According to Paris (ETC)
- September 14: Love Spell (Telenovela Channel)
- September 15: Untold Stories (TV5)
- September 16: Reaksyon Weekend (TV5/AksyonTV 41)
- September 18: 2012 Shakey's V-League Open Conference (IBC 13)
- September 28:
  - Dinosaur King (ABS-CBN 2)
  - Yu-Gi-Oh! 5D's (ABS-CBN 2)
- September 29:
  - Kapuso Movie Festival (Saturday edition) (GMA 7)
  - Pinoy Adventures (GMA 7)
- October 1: ER season 4 (Fox Channel Philippines)
- October 5:
  - Faithfully (GMA 7)
  - One True Love (GMA 7)
  - Lorenzo's Time (ABS-CBN 2)
- October 11: UAAP Season 75 Men's and Women's basketball tournament (Studio 23)
- October 12: Slayers Revolution (ABS-CBN 2)
- October 14:
  - Jollitown (season 5) (ABS-CBN 2)
  - The X Factor Philippines season 1 (ABS-CBN 2)
- October 19:
  - Inside Protege (GMA 7)
  - A Woman's Word (Telenovela Channel)
- October 20: Kapuso Sine Siesta (GMA 7)
- October 21:
  - Protégé: The Battle For The Big Artista Break (GMA 7)
  - Third Eye (TV5)
- October 24: The Next (ETC)
- October 26:
  - Hindi Ka na Mag-iisa (GMA 7)
  - Luna Blanca (GMA 7)
  - Equator Man (ABS-CBN 2)
  - Walang Hanggan (ABS-CBN 2)
  - In da Loop (ABS-CBN 2/CgeTV)
  - NCAA Season 88 basketball tournaments (IBC 13)
- October 27: Artista Academy (TV5)
- October 28: Sunday Blockbuster (TV5)
- October 29:
  - RPN NewsWatch (ETC on RPN 9)
  - RPN NewsCap (ETC on RPN 9)
- October 30:
  - Pananampalataya, Pag-asa at Pag-ibig (GEM TV/Net 25)
  - GEM TV News (GEM TV)
- October 31: ER season 5 (Fox Channel Philippines)
- November 2:
  - Nura: Rise of the Yokai Clan (ABS-CBN 2)
  - Precious Hearts Romances Presents: Pintada (ABS-CBN 2)
  - Moon Embracing the Sun (GMA 7)
- November 10:
  - Kapuso Movie Night: Pinoy Flicks (GMA 7)
  - Kapuso Movie Night: Asian Kicks (GMA 7)
- November 15: Angel's Temptation (GMA 7)
- November 16:
  - Heroman (ABS-CBN 2)
  - Kung Ako'y Iiwan Mo (ABS-CBN 2)
  - Phineas and Ferb (TV5)
- November 21: Friends season 1 (Fox Channel Philippines)
- November 23: Coffee Prince (GMA 7)
- November 30: ER season 6 (Fox Channel Philippines)
- December 2: Manny Many Prizes (GMA 7)
- December 7:
  - Metal Fight Beyblade (ABS-CBN 2)
  - Love You a Thousand Times (TV5)
- December 13: Hamon ng Kalikasan (GMA News TV 11)
- December 14: Angelito: Ang Bagong Yugto (ABS-CBN 2)
- December 15: The Amazing Race season 1 (TV5)
- December 17: Survivor: Philippines (GMA News TV 11)
- December 20: Gossip Girl (ETC)
- December 21: The X Factor season 2 (Studio 23)
- December 24: Friends season 2 (Fox Channel Philippines)
- December 28: Nay-1-1 (GMA 7)

=== Stopped airing ===
- June 10: (Reason: pre-empted by Pacquiao vs. Bradley)
  - Kapuso Movie Festival (GMA 7)
  - Party Pilipinas (GMA 7)
- June 23/July 14: (Reason: pre-empted by News5 replays)
  - Tutok Tulfo (AksyonTV 41)
- June 24/July 29: (Reason: pre-empted by News5 replays)
  - USI: Under Special Investigation (AksyonTV 41)
- July 14: (Reason: pre-empted by Philippine Popular Music Festival)
  - Super Sine Prime (TV5)
  - Tutok Tulfo (TV5)
- July 15: (Reason: pre-empted by Paalam, Mang Pidol)
  - Kapitan Awesome (TV5)
  - Sunday Sineplex (TV5)
- July 29: (Reason: pre-empted by Third Eye and Video Incredible)
  - USI: Under Special Investigation (TV5)

=== Unknown ===
- Magic? Bagsik! (TV5)
- Maunlad na Agrikultura (TV5)
- Video Incredible (TV5)
- Ben 10 (TV5)
- Courage the Cowardly Dog (TV5)
- Foster's Home for Imaginary Friends (TV5)
- Johnny Bravo (TV5)
- Runaway (TV5)
- Stitch! (TV5)
- The Suite Life of Zack & Cody (TV5)
- A.T.O.M. (Studio 23)
- Blue Dragon (Studio 23)
- Heartstrings (Studio 23)
- Hitman Reborn! (Studio 23)
- Justice League (Studio 23)
- Marcelino Pan y Vino (Studio 23)
- Math-Tinik (Studio 23)
- Mina and Porfy (Studio 23)
- Off the Map (Studio 23)
- Perfect Match (Studio 23)
- Power Rangers Samurai (Studio 23)
- Pucca (Studio 23)
- Robin Hood (Studio 23)
- Rocko's Modern Life (Studio 23)
- Snow White (Studio 23)
- W.I.T.C.H. (Studio 23)
- X-Men (Studio 23)
- @ Ur Serbis (PTV 4)
- America Atbp. (PTV 4)
- Borderless Adventure (PTV 4)
- Concert At The Park (PTV 4)
- Congress In Action with Freddie Abando (PTV 4)
- Paco Park Presents (PTV 4)
- Pinoy T.A.L.K. (Travel, Adventure, Leisure, Knowledge) (PTV 4)
- Pulis Ako, Pulis Nyo Po (PTV 4)
- Puso ng Bayan PCSO Caravan (PTV 4)
- Sa Likod ng Istorya (PTV 4)
- Saving ASEAN Natural Treasures (PTV 4)
- She Said, She Said (PTV 4)
- Talking Points: Ang Tinig ng Serbisyo Publiko (PTV 4)
- Two Stops Over With Paco Guerrero (2nd Avenue)
- Armor of God (GMA News TV 11)
- Design Para sa Lahat (GMA News TV 11)
- Game! (GMA News TV 11)
- Nancy Lumen: The Pinoy Foodie (GMA News TV 11)
- Remix Report (GMA News TV 11)
- Sarap at Home (GMA News TV 11)
- Sarap to Heart (GMA News TV 11)
- Showbiz Exclusives (GMA News TV 11)
- Bayanihan (UNTV 37)
- Camera Geek TV (Net 25)
- Destination Philippines (Net 25)
- Exclusive (Net 25)
- Footprints (Net 25)
- Light of Salvation (Net 25)
- May Kanluran Pa (Net 25)
- On-Set: The World Class Filipino Artist (Net 25)
- Red Carpet (Net 25)
- Buhay Pinoy (Light TV 33)
- God is at Work (Light TV 33)
- Health is Wealth (Light TV 33)
- Inter-Mission (Light TV 33)
- Pilipinas Pinagpala Ka Hallelujah Talaga! (Light TV 33)
- Postcards (Light TV 33)

== Networks ==
The following is a list of Free-to-Air and Local Cable Networks making noteworthy launches and closures during 2012.

=== Launches ===
Date	Station	Channel	Source
January 1	Fox Movies Premium	SkyCable Channel 170 (HD)	
March 1	Fox Filipino	Cignal Channel 24; Cablelink Channel 53; G Sat Channel 108; Dream Satellite TV Channel 11	
April 2	beTV Philippines	SkyCable Channel 35	
April 12	Hyper	Cignal Channel 53	
April 15	Discovery Kids	SkyCable Channel 120	
May 12	Colours	Cignal Channel 27 (SD) / 57 (HD)	
May 12	Weather Information Network	Cignal Channel 3	
July 16	Viva TV	Cignal Channel 16; Dream Channel 54	
October 20	Jack City	UHF Channel 31 (now broadcast on cable since September 2014)	
October 22	Jeepney TV	SkyCable Channel 9 Destiny Cable Channel 41	
October 30	Solar News Channel	UHF Channel 21 (now VHF Channel 9)	
December 1	Cartoonito Asia	SkyCable Channel 125	
December 1	Toonami Asia	SkyCable Channel 42; Destiny Cable Channel 42	
December 18	TeleAsia	Cignal Channel 12 (Filipino) / 84 (Chinese)	

=== Rebranded ===
The following is a list of television stations that have made or will make noteworthy network rebranded in 2012.

Date	Rebranded from	Rebranded to	Channel	Source
October 31	GEM TV	INC TV	UHF Channel 49 (now UHF Channel 48); SkyCable / Destiny Cable Channels 20 and 136	

=== Closures ===
Date	Station	Channel	Sign-on debut	Source
April 1	AXN Beyond Philippines	Sky Cable Channel 35 (Digital)	December 4, 2010	
July 13	Channel [V] Philippines	Destiny Cable Channel 46	May 1994	
July 15	Viva Cinema		May 1996	
August 3	Universal Channel	SkyCable Channel 73 (Digital)	July 2010	
September 30	CgeTV	SkyCable Channel 72 (Digital)	December 2010	
October 19	CHASE	31	December 2011	
October 29	Talk TV	21	March 2011	
November 30	Boomerang Asia	SkyCable Channel 125	March 14, 2004	

== Births ==
- August 22: Sebastian Benedict, actor
- October 17: Baylee van den Berg, half-South African model and actress

== Deaths ==
- January 29: Maan Panganiban, former courtside reporter turn News5 reporter, lymphoma (born 1986)
- February 18: Linda Estrella, Filipina movie star from Sampaguita Pictures (born 1922)
- March 2: Isagani Yambot, veteran Philippine newsman and publisher of Philippine Daily Inquirer, heart attack (born 1934)
- March 15: Luis Gonzales, Filipino movie star from Sampaguita Pictures, pneumonia (born 1928)
- April 5: Angelo Castro Jr., former ABS-CBN anchor and journalist, cancer (born 1945)
- April 6: Nita Javier, former LVN actress, cancer (born 1932)
- June 26: Mario O'Hara, award-winning director, leukemia (born 1944)
- July 8: Buboy Favor, executive producer of various GMA Network shows
- July 10: Dolphy, actor and comedian dubbed the "King of Comedy", chronic obstructive pulmonary disease and multiple organ failure (born 1928)
- August 18: Jesse Robredo, Department of the Interior and Local Government secretary, plane crash (born 1958)
- September 25: Jun Bote Bautista, news broadcaster and journalist (born 1939)
- September 30: Butch Maniego, sportscaster and executive director of the PBA D-League (born 1962)
- October 8: Marilou Diaz-Abaya, multi-awarded film director, breast cancer (born 1955)
- November 6: Julie Ann Rodelas, talent and model of ABS-CBN, murder (born 1992)
- November 26: Celso Ad. Castillo, award-winning film director, screenwriter and actor, heart attack (born 1943)

== See also ==
- 2012 in television
