= List of Precious Hearts Romances Presents episodes =

Precious Hearts Romances Presents is a 5-day Philippine program broadcast on ABS-CBN. It mainly focuses on adaptations of the best-selling paperbacks distributed by company holder Precious Hearts Romances from May 4, 2009, to September 27, 2019.

== Precious Hearts Romances Presents Episodes ==
=== Season 1 ===
==== Bud Brothers ====
Air date	May 4 – August 28, 2009
Synopsis	Rose Tan's story of a flower farm owned by eight male friends. The series lasted 4 months involving a story that revolves around each one of the male character simply nicknamed as the "Bud Brothers". One by one their stories about falling in love were told at each week-long episodes.
Director	Cathy Garcia-Molina
Cast	Jake Cuenca, Cristine Reyes, Rafael Rosell, Mariel Rodriguez, John Prats, Denise Laurel, Joem Bascon, Janna Dominguez, Manuel Chua, Valerie Concepcion, Guji Lorenzana, Kaye Abad, Will Devaughn, Wendy Valdez, Ahron Villena, Maricar Reyes
Narrator	Nikki Gil

==== Ang Lalaking Nagmahal Sa Akin ====
Air date	August 31 – October 16, 2009
Synopsis	Ang Lalaking Nagmahal Sa Akin by Vanessa, a romance writer from PHR, is the story of Flor who moves from the province to the city to in a hotel. She falls in love with the owner of the hotel, Zephy.
Director	Wenn V. Deramas
Cast	Toni Gonzaga, Derek Ramsay, Shamaine Centenera, Janus Del Prado, Beatriz Saw, Carla Humphries, Nikki Valdez, Franzen Fajardo, Ketchup Eusebio, Crispin Pineda, DJ Durano and Carla Martinez
Narrator	Toni Gonzaga

==== Somewhere In My Heart ====
Air date	October 19 – December 4, 2009
Synopsis	The story starts with a wild, fun and talkative woman named Femi. Femi is poor yet lively, she does everything to earn money for her family and her college fees. Femi has a crush for Aaron, a quiet yet rich guy. Although wealthy, Aaron is having family problems due to money. Femi tried to have a relationship with Aaron but is unsuccessful after being rejected by him. Femi runs away from the college and tried to be a nun, but even for that she is still unsuccessful. She then later tried to seduce and make Aaron fall in love with, by pretending that she is a nun.
Director	Cathy Garcia-Molina
Cast	Kaye Abad, Guji Lorenzana, Ahron Villena, Erika Padilla, Lloyd Zaragoza, Niña Dolino, Nicole Uysiuseng, Nikki Valdez and Matt Ranillo III
Narrator	Kaye Abad and Guji Lorenzana

==== My Cheating Heart ====
Air date	December 7, 2009 – January 29, 2010
Synopsis	My Cheating Heart. Mio thinks of Nadine as a friend, but she has a crush on him. When she finds out Mio already has a girlfriend, she leaves the country. Later, she returns and attempts to get Mio to fall in love with her.
Director	Rory B. Quintos
Cast	Cristine Reyes, Jake Cuenca, Bangs Garcia, Tom Rodriguez, Beatriz Saw, Janus Del Prado, Irma Adlawan
Narrator	Cristine Reyes

=== Season 2 ===
==== Impostor ====
Air date	May 17 – September 17, 2010
Synopsis	The story revolves around a young province woman named Devin. Devin believes that she was given an unusual face that no man would ever want. She envies women such as Mariz who is unhappily married to Anthony, who is her crush. Little that Devin know that Popoy, her childhood friend, have feelings for her. One day, both Devin and Mariz have been involved in the same car accident. Mariz died while Devin is able to live. Devin was given a choice to be able to live by a plastic surgeon named Monique Benitez, but in the face of Mariz. Devin agreed and was implanted with Mariz's face. Devin is now confused on how to live her new life after leaving Popoy and her poor life behind and starting a new life with a new beautiful face with the man of her dreams.
Director	Jerome Chavez Pobocan
Cast	Maja Salvador, Sam Milby, Melai Cantiveros, Jason Francisco, Precious Lara Quigaman and Jon Avila
Narrator	Maja Salvador and Melai Cantiveros

==== Midnight Phantom ====
Air date	July 12 – August 13, 2010 (re-aired September 16 – October 10, 2014)
Synopsis	Ten years ago, Brandon was a college kid who fell in love with disturbed lounge crooner Anya. When Brandon meddled in what he thought was a domestic squabble between Anya and her lover Augusto, a sliver of glass runs through Brandon's face, leaving him scarred for life-literally and figuratively. Presently, Augusto has died, leaving Anya to be the sole guardian of his daughter from a previous marriage, Nadja. The typical college school girl, Nadja's guilty pleasure is to listen every night to a romantic DJ on the radio, the Midnight Phantom. After Nadia requests for the song "All I Ask of You" from the Midnight Phantom, which the disc jockey gladly obliges, singing the song live for the fan, an unusually love affair ensues. Nadja soon meets up with the Midnight Phantom and accepts an invitation for a getaway in his Phantom Island. Only then does she find out that the Midnight Phantom and Brandon, who her stepmother Anya has hurt in the past, are one and the same.
Director	Cathy Garcia-Molina
Cast	Rafael Rosell, Denise Laurel, Ina Raymundo, JM de Guzman, Charee Pineda and Jommy Teotico

==== Kristine ====
Air date	August 16, 2010 – February 11, 2011
Synopsis	The feud between the De Silva and Fortalejo families started when Romano Fortalejo refused to marry Alicia De Silva because he was in love with Ana. Romano and Ana's daughters Emerald and Jewel grew up not knowing anything about the feud but when their father dies leaving a lot of hospital bills and their house that their parent's worked hard for can be taken, Emerald who is the older sister goes to her grandfather to get the inheritance left to them by their grandmother. However, things will take an unexpected turn when she runs into Marco de Silva, as he kidnaps her after Emerald told him her name to get revenge on the family of Fortalejos.
Director	Rory Quintos
Cast	Cristine Reyes, Zanjoe Marudo, Rafael Rosell, Denise Laurel, Lito Legaspi, Irma Adlawan, William Lorenzo, Angel Jacob, Johnny Revilla, Carla Martinez, Eric Fructuoso, Rayver Cruz, JM De Guzman, Bangs Garcia, Iya Villania, Kristel Moreno

==== Alyna ====
Air date	September 20, 2010 – February 11, 2011
Synopsis	Alyna is a woman who grew up feeling unloved until she meets Rex. He was fun, charismatic and immediately swept Alyna off her feet. When she thought she finally found love in the arms of Rex, he suddenly disappears. Alyna is left alone, heartbroken and carrying his child. In the search for Rex, Alyna crosses paths with Dominic—a sad, serious and cold man. But as the days progress, the fire in Alyna’s heart blazes anew as she got to know the endearing qualities of Dominic. He could be the man Alyna was looking for all along. But Rex returns, promising to continue the love story he started weaving with Alyna. Who will Alyna choose---the man she loved first? Or the man who promises to love her forever? Soon after Alyna loses her memory and a new path begins again but will she find Dominic, her true love or will she end up loving another man who has fallen for her?
Director	FM Reyes
Cast	Shaina Magdayao, Sid Lucero, Jason Abalos, Kaye Abad, JM De Guzman, Charee Pineda, Paul Jake Castillo, Beauty Gonzalez, Jose Sarasola, Ma. Isabel Lopez, Francine Prieto, Edward Mendez
Creatives	Temi Abad, Ruby Leah Castro, Jurey Mirafuentes

==== Mana Po ====
Air date	February 21 – April 1, 2011
Synopsis	A young woman returns to her home province to woo her furious childhood sweetheart who discovers that her family's immense wealth rightfully belongs to him.
Director	Katski Flores, Theodore Boborol
Cast	Melisa Cantiveros, Jason Francisco, Tom Rodriguez, Megan Young, RR Enriquez

=== Season 3 ===
==== Lumayo Ka Man Sa Akin ====
Air date	January 23 – May 4, 2012
Synopsis	Based on Martha Cecila's Pangako the story revolves on Janine, rich, beautiful, and has a fiancé named Matthew, who she is about to marry Janine, has lived a pretty pampered life until a dark revelation by her father causes her on a search to find out about her mothers true identity, and her real mothers explanation on why she felt she had to leave her father. But in the end will time repeat itself between mother and daughter when Janine meets Jake, while in heart she is still in love with Matthew?
Directors	Katski Flores, Toto Natividad
Cast	Maja Salvador, Jason Abalos, Patrick Garcia, Ina Feleo, Ariel Rivera, Ina Raymundo, Toby Alejar, Mico Palanca

==== Hiyas ====
Air date	May 28 – July 13, 2012
Synopsis	Silang is a native warrior from the tribe of Tanah. He wants to marry his childhood sweetheart Giana to unite their warring clans. But the family of Giana has one condition: Silang has to find and bring back the missing Gem of Tanah that gives luck and prosperity to their people. There is only one person who can help Silang find and get the Gem. She's none other than Sapphire, the beautiful and charming city girl who Silang's avoiding. Though he doesn’t want to, Silang is forced to partner with her, who is more than willing to help as her heart is close to the people of Tanah. While they are searching for the Gem, Silang and Sapphire are drawn closer to each other. Eventually, the Gem falls in Silang’s hands as he falls in love with Sapphire.
Directed by	Adolfo Alix, Jr., Theodore Boborol
Cast	Zanjoe Marudo, Megan Young, Edward Mendez, Mercedes Cabral, John Arcilla, Tetchie Agbayani, Nonie Buencamino, Sharmaine Suarez, Allan Paule, Kristel Moreno

==== Pintada ====
Air date	July 16 – November 2, 2012
Synopsis	A love story between a high school boy Sev and his teacher Lysa, who loses her beauty in a tragic fire. This gave her a lifetime scar, physically and emotionally. Lysa is a young woman with beauty desired by men and envied by women. One day, a fire breaks out in the school she works in. While trying to rescue her students, a part of her face gets burned. Some people die in the fire, among them is a man rumoured to have an affair with her. Besieged by hatred from the townfolks and ashamed of her badly burned face, Lysa decides to leave and live in seclusion.
Direction	Cathy Garcia-Molina, Toto Natividad
Cast	Denise Laurel, Martin del Rosario, Yen Santos, James Reid, Lemuel Pelayo, Ricardo Cepeda, Nikka Valencia, Alma Concepcion, Bernadette Allyson, Trina Lagaspi, Chase Vega

==== Paraiso ====
Air date	November 5, 2012 – April 5, 2013
Synopsis	Paraiso tells the story of two strangers, Brennan and Yani, who get stranded on an island after their ship gets wrecked. Romance blooms between them as they spend time alone on the island, but the two strangers are not without their respective baggage from the "real world." Brennan is married to his dedicated wife Megan, while Yani's childhood best friend Justin has untold feelings for the young woman. The romance that grows between Yani and Brennan will set off a series of twists and conflicts after the two gets back to their own lives in Manila.
Directed by	Connie Macatuno, Nico Hernandez, Rechie Del Carmen
Cast	Jessy Mendiola, Matteo Guidicelli, Jewel Mische, Matt Evans, Arron Villaflor, Dionne Monsanto, Alex Castro, Kathleen Hermosa, Angel Jacob, Bodjie Pascua, Ces Quesada, Juan Rodrigo, Evangeline Pascual, Denise Laurel, Guji Lorenzana
Creatives	John Roque, Ruby Leah Castro, Jurey Mirafuentes, Julius Villanueva, Bianca Geli, Mike Transfiguracion

=== Season 4 ===
==== Araw Gabi ====
Air date	April 30 – October 12, 2018
Synopsis	The series revolves around Michelle, who sees a brighter future ahead despite her hardships in life, and the CEO of Olvidar Group of Companies, Adrian, who still carry baggage from his dark past. The two developed sweet hatred for each other on their first meetings, but it became twisted when the aspiring lass discovered that the guy that she loathes is the client of their company. This will break her heart in the end—because the business proposal of her agency will be declined because of her. However, this will not stop the sanguine from vying in her career. She follow the water to personally visit and conduct her research on Adrian's holdings— Tranquila Resort. Soon after setting foot on the Island of El Paradiso, both of them will be surprised that they are in the same place at the same time, which will give us the question: What wonders will this paradise offer the two of them?
Directed by	Theodore Boborol, Myla Ajero-Gaite, Don M. Cuaresma
Cast	Barbie Imperial, JM De Guzman, Jane Oineza, RK Bagatsing, Vina Morales, Raymond Bagatsing, Ara Mina, Rita Avila, Victor Silayan, Phoebe Walker, Paulo Angeles, Ysabel Ortega, Joshua Colet, Ivana Alawi, Jai Agpangan, Alexa Miro, Arlene Muhlach, Eric Nicolas
Creatives	Willy Laconsay, Mary Rose Colindres, Jose Ruel L. Garcia

==== Los Bastardos ====
Air date	October 15, 2018 – September 27, 2019
Synopsis	Los Bastardos, which is based on the Cardinal Bastards series of Precious Hearts Romances, tells the story of five brothers who must fight against each other for the right to the power and money of the Cardinal family, led by its patriarch, Don Roman Cardinal. Don Roman will lead a happy life with his small family until tragedy strikes which will lead him to look for true love from four other women. He will sire five sons from five different women. There is Isagani, Don Roman's long-lost son with his first love; Joaquin, the only son who'll grow up under his care; Matteo, who will grow up with the rival family of the Cardinals; Connor, who will become a conman bent on destroying the Cardinal wealth; and Lucas, who will grow up not knowing the man he serves is his own father. Although they come from different worlds, they are bound together by the same blood. Find out how their lives will become intertwined when they start learning the truth behind their identities.
Directed by	Raymond B. Ocampo and Digo Ricio
Cast	Jake Cuenca, Ritz Azul, Diego Loyzaga, Albie Casiño, Jane Oineza, Marco Gumabao, Kylie Verzosa, Maxine Medina, Joshua Colet, Mica Javier, Mary Joy Apostol, Joseph Marco, Isabel Rivas, Lito Pimentel, Pinky Amador, Jeffrey Santos, Jean Saburit, Gloria Diaz, Ronaldo Valdez
Creatives	Carmela L. Abaygar, Genesis Rodriguez, Bridgette Ann Rebuca

== Special Episodes ==
=== Quikilig: Ma-iikling Kwento ng Pag-ibig (Quikilig: Short Love Stories) ===
==== Love Is Only in the Movies ====
Air date	February 1–12, 2010
Synopsis	Sheye (Mariel Rodriguez) grew up re-enacting famous movie scenes with her grandmother. As an adult, she becomes a "reality actress" who meets Xander (Zanjoe Marudo).
Director	GB Sampedro and Richard Arellano
Cast	Mariel Rodriguez, Zanjoe Marudo, Wendy Valdez, Drei Felix, Mico Palanca, Timmy Cruz, Flora Gasser
Narrator	Mariel Rodriguez

==== The Substitute Bride ====
Air date	February 15–26, 2010
Synopsis	Wilda's (Paw Diaz) falls in love with her boss, Brent (Rafael Rosell), who is engaged to Candra (Carla Humphries). Shortly before the wedding, Candra requests a postponement in a letter, but that would be a scandal to Brent's family and so he asks Wilda to take Candra's place.
Directors	Connie Macatuno, Nico Hernandez
Cast	Rafael Rosell, Paw Diaz, Carla Humphries, Ricardo Cepeda, Melissa Mendez, JM de Guzman, Soliman Cruz, Frances Ignacio, Lorenzo Mara
Narrator	Paw Diaz

==== You're Mine, Only Mine ====
Air date	March 1–12, 2010
Synopsis	The story started when a woman named Roxanne later found out that she was used by her dad as a payment for a debt to a guy named Alex, that can later bring him to jail. As time passed, the arranged couple realized that they are meant for each other as Roxanne falls for Alex.
Director	Jerry Lopez-Sineneng
Cast	Denise Laurel, Will Devaughn, Rey "PJ" Abellana, Susan Africa, Johnny Revilla, Regine Angeles, Victor Basa, Jairus Aquino
Narrator	Denise Laurel

==== Lumang Piso Para sa Puso ====
Air date	March 15–31, 2010
Synopsis	Sandra (Kristine Hermosa), falls in love with Dave (Oyo Sotto) when she sells him an antique coin from her grandmother, but thinks she will never see him. Sandra begins dreaming of her grandmother who is upset that Sandra sold the coin. Dave refuses to sell the coin back to Sandra so that he can complete the collection he had started with his dead father. After Sandra steals the coin from Dave and he finds out, she works as his maid and they fall in love.
Director	Laurenti Dyogi
Cast	Kristine Hermosa, Oyo Boy Sotto, Niña Jose, DJ Durano, Nina Dolino, Paul Salas, Dorothy Ann Perez, Angel Jacob, Mariel Solino
Narrator	Kristine Hermosa

==== Love Me Again ====
Air date	April 5 – May 14, 2010
Synopsis	A love quadrangle between Precy (Valerie Concepcion), her ex-boyfriend Chad (Tom Rodriguez) and Chad's new girlfriend, Pauleen (Cathy Remperas) who has recently dumped her brother Donnie (Johan Santos).
Director	Jojo Saguin and Ruel Bayani
Cast	Valerie Concepcion, Tom Rodriguez, Johan Santos, Cathy Remperas, Nina Ricci Alagao, Archie Alemania, Minnie Aguilar, Toffi Santos, Kenny Santos and JM Lagumbay
Narrator	Valerie Concepcion
