= Maria la del Barrio (Philippine TV series) =

2011–12 Philippine television drama series

- Title card
- Genre: Drama
- Created by: ABS-CBN Studios
- Based on: María la del Barrio by Inés Rodena
- Written by: Dexter Hemedez; Jimuel dela Cruz; Jerome Co
- Directed by: Rory B. Quintos; Richard V. Somes; Don M. Cuaresma
- Starring: Erich Gonzales; Enchong Dee
- Opening theme: "Patuloy ang Pangarap" by Angeline Quinto "Pagbigyang Muli" by Erik Santos "Mariang Taga Barrio" by Thalía
- Country of origin: Philippines
- Original language: Filipino
- No. of seasons: 2
- No. of episodes: 145

Production
- Executive producers: Carlo Katigbak; Cory Vidanes; Laurenti Dyogi; Ruel Bayani
- Producers: Sackey Prince Pendatun; Marjorie Lachica; Malou N. Santos; Des M. De Guzman
- Cinematography: Neil Daza; McCoy Ternate
- Editors: Joy Buenaventura; Ayen del Carmen; Dennis Salgado
- Running time: 28–33 minutes
- Production company: Star Creatives

Original release
- Network: ABS-CBN
- Release: August 15, 2011 – March 2, 2012

Maria la del Barrio (lit. 'Maria of the Barrio') is a Philippine television drama series broadcast by ABS-CBN. The series is based on the 1995 Mexican drama series of the same title. Directed by Rory B. Quintos, Richard V. Somes and Don M. Cuaresma, it stars Erich Gonzales and Enchong Dee. It aired on the network's Primetime Bida line up and worldwide on TFC from August 15, 2011 to March 2, 2012, replacing Mula sa Puso and was replaced by Wako Wako.

== Synopsis ==
Maria Hernandez (Erich Gonzales) is a charcoal maker who dreams of making furniture in her own shop, much like her mother Sandra (Assunta De Rossi), who died years ago in a fire leaving Maria orphaned. Maria grows up with Sandra's best friend Casilda (Ai-Ai delas Alas) in barrio Munting Ilog. When Casilda falls ill, Maria is forced to seek help from Father Honorio for added work. This leads her to meet Fernando de la Vega (Ian Veneracion), the owner of Amore Design, one of the country's top furniture companies. Fernando takes Maria to work for his family as a maid.

Unknown yet to Maria, Fernando was the former love of her mother Sandra. And that Fernando's wife Victoria (Angel Aquino), is Sandra's former friend and partner. Sandra and Victoria founded Amore designs, but Victoria double-crossed Sandra taking both her boyfriend and ownership of Amore. But before the fire, Sandra had bequeathed her shares to Maria, making Maria owner of 50% of Amore Designs.

Working for the De la Vegas leads Maria to meet, for the second time, Luis de la Vega (Enchong Dee), the eldest of the De la Vega children. Among those children are Vanessa (Jane Oineza) and Vladimir (Arron Villaflor). Maria had met and admired Luis before, seeing his work in Viscera, a small furniture shop. But Luis pays to her no mind. Worse, Luis, having had problems with his father Fernando, begins to suspect Maria to be Fernando's mistress. This through the suspicions of Soraya, his friend who is secretly in love with him. Luis makes Maria fall in love with him, with the intention of hurting Maria and making her leave.

Furthermore, he falls in love with Maria. And Maria, despite the pain, cannot help herself from loving Luis. But their love is put to the test by several trials. Such as, Soraya's attempt to break Luis apart from Maria, Sandra's comeback to ruin Victoria's life, lies that caused Maria's insanity which leads her into her wealthy transformation, and Sabrina who will do her best for her to keep Maria's daughter, Andrea. But an unfortunate disease will finally cause Soraya's life. Could this be Soraya's time to pay her sins to Maria?

== Cast and characters ==
=== Protagonist ===
- Erich Gonzales as María Hernandez
- Enchong Dee as Luis Fernando M. Dela Vega

=== Main cast ===
- Angel Aquino as Victoria Montenegro-Dela Vega
- Ian Veneracion as Fernando Dela Vega
- Assunta De Rossi as Sandra Hernandez

=== Supporting cast ===
- Jewel Mische as Sabrina Villabrille
- Paw Diaz as Soraya Montenegro
- Arron Villaflor as Vladimir M. Dela Vega
- Jake Roxas as David Decasa
- Jane Oineza as Vanessa M. Dela Vega
- Alyanna Angeles as Andrea "Andi" H. Dela Vega

=== Recurring cast ===
- K Brosas as Carlota
- Katya Santos as Cha-Cha
- Badjie Mortiz as Urbano
- Justin Gonzales as Pedro
- Atoy Co as Mang Doro
- Chiqui del Carmen as Lupe
- Peewee O'Hara as Berta
- Isay Alvarez as Calixta
- Gio Alvarez as Anot

=== Guest cast ===
- Rolando Inocencio as Padre Honorio
- Joed Serrano as Atty. Paul Parco
- Dionne Monsanto as Anna
- Fred Payawan as Kevin
- Frances Makil-Ignacio as Jessica
- Erika Padilla as Liz
- Marithez Samson as Mother Rosario
- Maritess Joaquin as Marnette
- Manuel Chua as Roel
- Paul Jake Castillo as Gabe
- Joe Gruta as Kiko
- Rommel Velasquez as Atty. Santos
- Shey Bustamante as Gret
- Helga Krapf as Mia
- Noel Colet as Enrique Villabrille
- Johan Santos as Kent
- Kristoff Meneses as Mac Mac
- Niña Dolino as Bianca Lopez
- Boom Labrusca as Edwin Marasigan
- Archie Alemania as Nelson
- Cherry Lou as Christina Ruiz
- Regine Angeles as Lorrine Ruiz
- Luke Jickain as Alex
- Art Acuña as Attorney Fajardo
- Justin Cuyugan as Arturo
- Raul Montessa as Judge Sarmiento
- Gem Ramos as Hope
- Perla Bautista as Tita
- Lloyd Zaragoza as Arnold

=== Special participation ===
- Ai-Ai delas Alas as Casilda Dimaculangan
- Christian Vasquez as Manuel Hernandez
- Dennis Padilla as Chito Cayanan
- Miles Ocampo as Sunshine Cayanan

== Production ==
Production started in February 2011. The series was initially part of ABS-CBN's line-up of afternoon dramas, Kapamilya Gold, together with other television series; Nasaan Ka, Elisa?, Mula sa Puso, and Hiyas. However, teasers were released in July 2011, which stated that the show was to air on primetime. The series premiered on August 15, 2011 on Primetime Bida.

Last July 2016. ABS CBN revived the show by uploading Episode 1-145 on YouTube along with Hiyas, Lumayo Ka Man sa Akin, Pintada, Nasaan Ka, Elisa?, Paraiso and Angelito: Batang Ama.

=== Adaptation ===
María la del Barrio, originally aired on Televisa in 1995. It was the third telenovela in the trilogy of Maria, that starred Thalia. The show first aired in the Philippines through RPN in 1996-1997, GMA Network in 2002-2003 and TV5 and One Screen in 2021-2022, dubbed in Filipino. After GMA Network's successful adaptations of Thalia's Marimar and Rosalinda, ABS-CBN decided to remake María la del Barrio.

=== Postponement, reshoots and recasts ===
There were speculations that the production had to reshoot several scenes because the network was not convinced with the outcome of the already-shot episodes. In addition, several characters were recast, including a lengthy casting process for the role of Vladimir de la Vega. Inno Martin was originally cast to play the role of Vladimir, but after several failed recastings, the role eventually ended up being played by Arron Villaflor. The role was first offered to Enrique Gil. However, Gil had to decline due to conflicting working schedules. Inno Martin's scenes as Vladimir prior to his replacement appeared in the show's first set of promos. When the show started production for the soon-to-be reshot episodes covering the first few months of the show, Martin was sacked with AJ Perez tapped to take-over the now-vacant role . But after Perez' untimely passing, Villaflor was brought in to take over the role of Vladimir. It finally premiered on August 15, 2011.

== Reception ==
=== Ratings ===
After the winning 26.0% finale rating of previous time slot occupant Mula Sa Puso, Maria la del Barrio maintained the network's hold on the 6pm slot. The series debuted in fifth place with a 22.5% rating. The series aired its last episode on March 2 and earned fifth place in the ratings, garnering 20% of viewers.

=== Critical reception ===
On a review done by the Philippine Entertainment Portal, they quoted that "Erich looks tailor-made for the role; with her natural ability to summon naïve, childlike qualities with relative ease." They also stated that the scenes between the two lead actors provided the "'kilig' factor commonly sought by local viewers." The review concluded, "Erich has a wonderful opportunity to embrace the character as her own without having to live in the shadow of her famous Mexican predecessor."

== Awards ==
Year	Award-Giving Body	Category	Recipient	Result
2012	GMMSF Box-Office Entertainment Awards	Most Popular Loveteam in Movies and Television	Enchong Dee and Erich Gonzales	Won

== See also ==
- List of programs broadcast by ABS-CBN
- María la del Barrio
