= Wako Wako =

- Title card
- Genre: Comedy; Drama; Fantasy
- Written by: Raymund Barcelon; Wenn V. Deramas; Honey Hidalgo; Roger Ramos; Bridgette Ann Rebuca
- Directed by: Wenn V. Deramas; Ricky S. Rivero
- Starring: Ai-Ai de las Alas; Yogo Singh; Gladys Reyes
- Opening theme: "Wako Wako" by Yogo Singh
- Country of origin: Philippines
- Original language: Filipino
- No. of episodes: 58

Production
- Executive producers: Carlo Katigbak; Cory Vidanes; Laurenti Dyogi; Ruel Bayani
- Producers: Desirey M. Fernandez-Juan; Raymund Barcelon; Rizza Gonzales-Ebriega
- Cinematography: Elmer Despa; Algin Siscar
- Editors: Daryll Albert; Romeo Fernandez; Jan Eric Hernandez
- Running time: 45 minutes
- Production company: RGE Drama Unit

Original release
- Network: ABS-CBN
- Release: March 5 – May 25, 2012

Related
- Maria la del Barrio; Precious Hearts Romances Presents: Hiyas

Wako Wako is a 2012 Philippine fantasy drama series broadcast by ABS-CBN. Directed by Wenn V. Deramas and Ricky S. Rivero, it stars Ai-Ai delas Alas, Yogo Singh and Gladys Reyes. It aired on the network's Primetime Bida line up and worldwide on TFC from March 5 to May 25, 2012, replacing Maria la del Barrio and was replaced by Precious Hearts Romances Presents: Hiyas. On May 7, the series was demoted to Kapamilya Gold afternoon block to give way for Aryana.

== Overview ==
=== Synopsis ===
Wako Wako is a story of seven-year-old boy Muymuy (Yogo Singh), who yearns to make his father, a respected policeman, proud. His cowardly nature, however, prevents him from doing so. He will discover a magical creature and he'll call it Wako. Wako-Wako fulfills all his wishes, but soon Muymuy discovers that every granted wish comes with a price.

A mysterious lady named Dyosa Marishka (Ai-Ai de las Alas) finds Muymuy and tells him that Wako is an Arukan and that she is a goddess of wishes in need of help from the creature. The goddess needs to find seven people who will provide pure selfless wishes to save her kingdom and bring her back to power. In return, Wako helps Muymuy with his family's problems in this endearing tale of friendship and relations.

== Cast and characters ==
=== Primary cast ===
- Marian "Gandang Girl" Barro as Wako-Wako
- Ai-Ai de las Alas as Dyosa Marishka
- Yogo Singh as Rodel "Muymuy" Gaudencio Jr.
- Gladys Reyes as Isay Gaudencio

=== Secondary cast ===
- Vandolph Quizon as Rodel Gaudencio
- Maricar de Mesa as Lilibeth
- Malou de Guzman as Teresing "Ima" Gaudencio
- Dennis Padilla as Tanyo
- DJ Durano as Dado Calleja
- Karen Dematera as Verma
- Carlos Agassi as Tummy Nograles
- Markki Stroem as Kyle
- Liezel Garcia as Nora Santos
- Tess Antonio as Vilma
- Eagle Riggs as Turing
- Franco Daza as Draco Calleja
- Joy Viado† as Senyang
- Abby Bautista as Mica
- Ruther Urquia as Arukans (voice)
- Lou Veloso as Chief Satano

=== Guest cast ===
- Simon Ibarra as Lando Martinez
- Kenji Shirakawa as Mark Rodriguez
- Kyle Ang as Jonas Calleja
- Amy Nobleza as Young Ima
- Rustica Carpio
- Neri Naig as Carmen
- Ina Feleo as Teresa Calleja
- Ricky Rivero as Obet
- Michael Agassi as Gaston
- Jelo Echaluce as Jumbo
- Cecil Paz as Miss U
- Rita Rosario G. Carlos as Urduja
- Jommy Teotico as Police Asset
- Ronnie Golpeo as RonnieL
- Minco Fabregas as Mayor
- Miguelito de Guzman as Rusty
- Manuel Chua as Mr. Lee

=== List of Arukans ===
- Dyosa Marishka - Goddess of arukanan
- Barkan/Wako Wako - Best friend of Muymuy
- Muymuy - People body but heart of arukan, he is the last arukan
- Tanderkan - Anchorite of arukanan
- Ponkan
- Louverkan
- Trashkan
- Linggitkan
- Genghiskan
- Luciokan
- Odettekan
- Dezcanca/Ukaw Ukaw - The bad arukan

== Production ==
Starting May 7, 2012, when the series moved to Kapamilya Gold Timeslot, Wako Wako is not available in all ABS-CBN Regional Network Group channels due to local versions of TV Patrol on the same time slot. Instead a replay of recent broadcasts are shown the next day mostly Mondays-Fridays on its morning block.

== See also ==
- List of programs broadcast by ABS-CBN Corporation
- List of dramas of ABS-CBN Corporation
