= Maria Mercedes (Philippine TV series) =

- Title card
- Genre: Romantic drama
- Created by: ABS-CBN Studios; Gina Marissa Tagasa
- Based on: María Mercedes by Inés Rodena
- Developed by: ABS-CBN Studios; Ruel S. Bayani
- Written by: Raymund Barcelon; Janice O'Hara; Bridgette Rebuca; Genesis Rodriguez
- Directed by: Chito S. Roño; Rechie A. del Carmen; Ricky S. Rivero; Nuel C. Naval
- Creative director: Johnny delos Santos
- Starring: Jessy Mendiola; Jake Cuenca; Jason Abalos
- Theme music composer: Viviana Pímstein; Paco Navarette; Jonathan Manalo
- Opening theme: "Maria Mercedes" by Jessy Mendiola
- Ending theme: "Maria Mercedes" by Luisa Sta. Maria
- Country of origin: Philippines
- Original language: Filipino
- No. of episodes: 80

Production
- Executive producers: Carlo Katigbak; Cory Vidanes; Laurenti Dyogi; Ruel Bayani
- Producers: Rachel Aguilos; Desirey Fernandez-Juan
- Cinematography: Eric dela Cruz; Jafet Tutanes
- Running time: 30-45 minutes
- Production companies: RSB Production Unit; Televisa

Original release
- Network: ABS-CBN
- Release: October 7, 2013 – January 24, 2014

Maria Mercedes is a Philippine television drama romance series broadcast by ABS-CBN. The series is based on the 1992 Mexican drama series of the same title. Directed by Chito S. Roño, Rechie A. del Carmen, Ricky S. Rivero and Nuel C. Naval, it stars Jessy Mendiola as the titular role, Jake Cuenca and Jason Abalos. It aired on the network's Primetime Bida line up and worldwide on TFC from October 7, 2013 to January 24, 2014, replacing Muling Buksan ang Puso and was replaced by The Legal Wife.

== Cast and characters ==
=== Main cast ===
- Jessy Mendiola as Maria Mercedes Alegre-del Olmo/Sancuevas
- Jake Cuenca as Luis Sancuevas
- Jason Abalos as Clavio Mondejar

=== Supporting cast ===
- Vina Morales as Magnolia Alegre
- Ariel Rivera as Santiago del Olmo
- Nikki Gil as Misty Delaver
- Vivian Velez as Malvina Sancuevas
- Nadia Montenegro as Filomena Mondejar
- Atoy Co as Oscar Mondejar
- Marx Topacio as Guillermo Alegre
- Devon Seron as Rosario Alegre
- Isabella de Leon as Digna Sancuevas
- Yogo Singh as Andres Alegre
- Alex Castro as Anthony Figueras
- Twinkle Dy as Twinkle
- Tess Antonio as Sylvia "Ibyang"
- Sharmaine Suarez as Daisy Torrecampo
- Via Veloso as Susan Mendez
- Simon Ibarra as Cordelio Capili
- Jerry O'Harra as Dr. Carlos Buenafe

=== Extended cast ===
- Shey Bustamante as Emery
- Peter Serrano as Enrique
- Phoemela Baranda as Yvette
- Carlo Romero as Jacob
- Crispin Pineda as Mang Ben
- Jovic Monsod as Basti
- Erika Padilla as Lou
- Vangie Martelle as Shane
- Benjamin De Guzman as Edwin
- Archie Alemania as Rex
- Zeppi Borromeo as Mac
- Jose Sarasola as Gio
- Jaycee Parker as Frances
- Mike Lloren as Roi

=== Guest cast ===
- Lollie Mara as Doña Carmen
- Diana Hughes as Vanessa
- Pontri as Alvaro - husband of Malvina
- Beauty Gonzalez as Edna
- Paul Jake Castillo as Adam
- Ynna Asistio as Eula

=== Special participation ===
- Tetchie Agbayani as Bettina Delaver
- Jeffrey Santos as Bodjie
- Dominic Ochoa as Manuel Alegre
- Alexa Ilacad as young Mercedes
- Carlo Lacana as young Luis
- John Bermundo as young Clavio
- Belle Mariano as young Rosario
- John Manalo as young Guillermo

== Soundtrack ==
- Maria Mercedes - Jessy Mendiola
- Siege Towers (No Choir) - Audiomachine
- María Mercedes - Thalía

== Reception ==
KANTAR MEDIA NATIONAL TV RATINGS (09:15PM PST)
PILOT EPISODE	FINALE EPISODE	PEAK	AVERAGE	SOURCE
23.8%	22.8%	TBA	TBA	

== See also ==
- List of programs broadcast by ABS-CBN
- List of ABS-CBN Studios original drama series
- María Mercedes (Mexican TV series)
