= Must Date the Playboy =

2015 Philippine romantic comedy film

- Directed by: Mae Cruz-Alviar
- Written by: Vannesa R. Valdez; Anna Karenina Ramos; Roumella Nina Monge-Narciso; John Raphael Gonzaga
- Based on: "Must Date the Playboy" by Imma delos Santos
- Produced by: Charo Santos-Concio; Carlo L. Katigbak; Nandy Villar
- Starring: Kim Chiu; Xian Lim; Jessy Mendiola
- Cinematography: Anna Karenina Ramos; Roumella Nina Monge-Narciso
- Edited by: Mario Arbizo; Yog Diores Macan
- Music by: Jesse Lasaten
- Production company: StarFlix
- Distributed by: iWant TV
- Release date: August 1, 2015
- Running time: 120 minutes
- Country: Philippines
- Languages: Filipino; English

Must Date the Playboy is a Philippine romantic comedy film series produced by StarFlix, a division of Star Cinema directed by Mae Cruz-Alviar starring Kim Chiu, Xian Lim and Jessy Mendiola. It is the first mobile series in ABS-CBNmobile. It is only available for ABS-CBNmobile sim users who registered with the iWant TV promo.

== Plot ==
Zach (Xian Lim) is a playboy who breaks up with all of his girlfriends. Chloe (Jessy Mendiola), his current girlfriend, catches him dancing with another girl. Tori (Kim Chiu) is Chloe's overprotective best friend. Chloe asks Tori to do her a favor: she wants her to date Zach.

== Cast ==
=== Main cast ===
- Kim Chiu as Victoria "Tori / Bicay" Alcantara
- Xian Lim as Zachary "Zach" Andres
- Jessy Mendiola as Chloe Santillan

=== Supporting cast ===
- Matt Evans as Nathan Ocampo
- Irma Adlawan as Nora Alcantara
- Jim Paredes as Anoy Andres
- Dimples Romana as Andrea Andres
- John Spainhour

=== Special participation ===
- Erika Padilla as Joy
