= Assunta de Rossi =

Filipino actress

Assunta De Rossi
- Born: Assunta Tiotangco Schiavone; February 19, 1983 (age 43); Lecce, Italy
- Citizenship: Philippines; Italy
- Years active: 1995–present
- Spouse: Julio Ledesma IV (m. 2002)
- Children: 1
- Relatives: Alessandra De Rossi (sister)

Assunta Tiotangco Schiavone-Ledesma (born February 19, 1983), better known by her stage name Assunta de Rossi, is a Filipino actress. Her younger sister by one year Alessandra De Rossi is also an actress. Both sisters have won the Best Actress award at the Metro Manila Film Festival.

As a young actress she was well known for the films Ibulong Mo Sa Diyos 2 (1997), Hubog (2001), Azucena (2001), Red Diaries (2001), and Bahid (2002). She also starred in ensemble comedies such as Jologs (2002), Pinay Pie (2003). She returned to television in 2011 with roles in the remakes of Mula sa Puso and Maria la del Barrio.

== Early and personal life ==
De Rossi was born in Lecce, Italy, to Nenita Schiavone, a Filipina, and Italian Luigi Schiavone. Her siblings include Alessandra De Rossi, Margherita and Isabel.

In 2002, she married in a civil wedding Congressman Julio A. Ledesma IV in San Carlos, Negros Occidental. On March 15, 2004, their Catholic marriage was solemnized at the Sanctuario de San Antonio in Forbes Park, Makati. Ledesma is the son of Conchita Arenas Ledesma. His children from previous marriage include Cristina Julieta Victoria and Julio Carlos Tomas.

On October 24, 2020, after suffering from myoma and endometriosis, she gave birth to Giulia Fiorentina 'Fiore' Alessandra Schiavone Ledesma.

== Filmography ==
=== Film ===
- Sa Kabilugan ng Buwan (1997)
- Sabi Mo Mahal Mo Ako Wala ng Bawian (1997)
- Ibulong Mo sa Diyos 2 (1997)
- Sige Subukan Mo (1998)
- Hangga't Kaya Kong Lumaban (1998)
- Sumigaw Ka Hanggang Gusto Mo (1999)
- Kanang kanay: Ituro Mo, Itutumba Ko (1999)
- Ikaw Lamang (1999)
- Tugatog (2000)
- Baliktaran: Si Ace at Daisy (2001)
- Red Diaries (2001)
- Sisid (2001)
- Hubog (2001)
- Kilabot at Kembot (2002)
- Jologs (2002)
- Bahid (2002)
- Pinay Pie (2003)
- Mourning Girls (2006)
- Beauty in a Bottle (2014)
- Crazy Beautiful You (2015) Carmela
- The Super Parental Guardians (2016) Maria Felicidad "Marife" Delos Santos
- Tres (segment "Amats") as Shelly Roxas

=== Television ===
Year	Title	Role	Notes
1995	That's Entertainment	Herself credited as Assunta Schiavone	
1995	Ober Da Bakod	Herself	
1995	Bubble Gang	Herself	
1998	Magandang Tanghali Bayan	Guest host	
1998	Hiwalay Kung Hiwalay		
1999	Pintados	Maya/Muyumi	
1999	Beh Bote Nga		
2000	Kakabakaba (Episode: The Dormitory)	Alex	
2003	Hawak Ko ang Langit	Lorena	
2003–2004	Buttercup	Sharon	
2004	Maid in Heaven	Sharon	
2005–2006	Vietnam Rose	Adriana	
2007	Komiks Presents: Da Adventures of Pedro Penduko	Isindra	
2008	Camera Café	Puri	
2009	Carlo J. Caparas' Pieta	Sabrina	
2009	Komiks Presents: Mars Ravelo's: Nasaan Ka Maruja?	Stefanie Miranda	
2009	Maalaala Mo Kaya: Bulaklak	Nellie	
2009	Lovers in Paris	Eunice Gatus	
2010	Showtime	Judge	
2010	Maalaala Mo Kaya: Funeral Parlor	Mabel	
2011	Mula sa Puso	Criselda Pereira†	
2011	Maalaala Mo Kaya: Palengke	Gamay	
2011	Wansapanataym: John Tamad	Vivian	
2011–2012	Maria la del Barrio	Sandra Hernandez	
2012	Wansapanataym: Hungry Birds	Lora San Miguel	
2012	Maalaala Mo Kaya: Cards	Josie Yamson	
2012	Wansapanataym: The Amazing Gelliescope	Mrs. Tuazon	
2012–2013	Kahit Puso'y Masugatan	Belen Salvacion	
2012–2013	Be Careful With My Heart	Katrina "Ina" Ruiz	
2013	Kidlat	young Dulce	
2013	Wansapanataym: No Read, No Write, Nomar	Tanya	
2013	Maalaala Mo Kaya: Kamison	Young Tessa	
2013	Maalaala Mo Kaya: Picture Frame	Grace	
2014	Maalaala Mo Kaya: Dos Por Dos	Ellen	
2014	Wansapanataym: Si Lulu at si Lily Liit	Alyson Mendoza	
2014	Maalaala Mo Kaya: Palayan	Saling	
2015	Maalaala Mo Kaya: Parol	Erlinda "Erly" Ravelo-Torres	
2015–2016	You're My Home	Jackie Cabanero	
2016	Ipaglaban Mo: Kahati	Lorraine	
2016	Karelasyon	Caring	
2016	Wagas	Tess	
2016	Dear Uge	Chacha Alimurong	
2016	Magkaibang Mundo	Amanda Santos-Sandoval	
2017–2018	Impostora	Katrina "Trina" Saavedra	
2026	Bubble Gang	her comeback to showbiz via Bubble Gang	

== Awards ==
Year	Award-Giving Body	Category	Work	Result
2001	Metro Manila Film Festival	Best Actress	Hubog	Won
