= Mula sa Puso (2011 TV series) =

2011 Philippine television action drama series

- Title card
- Genre: Action; Melodrama; Romance
- Created by: ABS-CBN Studios
- Based on: Mula sa Puso (1997–1999)
- Written by: Wenn V. Deramas
- Directed by: Wenn V. Deramas
- Starring: Lauren Young; JM De Guzman; Enrique Gil
- Opening theme: "Mula Sa Puso" by Jovit Baldivino
- Composer: Vehnee Saturno
- Country of origin: Philippines
- Original language: Filipino
- No. of episodes: 98

Production
- Executive producers: Carlo Katigbak; Cory Vidanes; Laurenti Dyogi; Roldeo Endrinal
- Producers: Mark Anthony Gile; Adjanet Rase; Maru R. Benitez
- Running time: 30-45 minutes
- Production company: Dreamscape Entertainment Television

Original release
- Network: ABS-CBN
- Release: March 28 – August 12, 2011

Mula sa Puso (International title: From the Heart) is a 2011 Philippine television drama action series broadcast by ABS-CBN. The series is a remake of the 1997 Philippine television series of the same title. Directed by Wenn V. Deramas, it stars Lauren Young, JM de Guzman and Enrique Gil. It aired on the network's Primetime Bida line up and worldwide on TFC from March 28 to August 12, 2011, taking over the previous timeslot of The Price is Right and was replaced by Maria la del Barrio.

Official promotional poster

== Overview ==
=== Adaptation ===
Mula sa Puso is a remake of the 1997 television series of the same title. The original version starred Claudine Barretto as Via, Rico Yan as Gabriel and Diether Ocampo as Michael. Two years after the series had its finale in 1999, it was adapted into a film where the whole cast reprised their roles except Ricardo Cepeda and Snooky Serna who played Abdon and Criselda. In March 2011, ABS-CBN announced that they had decided to remake the television series after the success of Mara Clara. The remake will star Lauren Young as Via, JM de Guzman as Gabriel, and Enrique Gil as Michael. Ariel Rivera and Eula Valdez, who were both part of the 1997 series and the 1999 film, joined the cast playing different roles this time. Wenn V. Deramas who directed the 1997 series and the 1999 film stepped in to direct the remake. The series adaptation is part of Kapamilya Gold, ABS-CBN's promotion for its upcoming series such as Nasaan Ka, Elisa?, Maria la del Barrio and Hiyas.

=== Synopsis ===
Via (Lauren Young) has been treated like a princess by her father, Don Fernando (Ariel Rivera), a millionaire. On Via's eighteenth birthday, her hand was given to her childhood friend Michael (Enrique Gil) for marriage, although she does not have feelings for him like he does for her. Amid this drama, a revelation will begin when Via's aunt, Selina (Eula Valdez) plots her personal retribution on her brother, at the expense of Via. In the process, Via will meet Gabriel (JM de Guzman) who will save her from her heartache and become her hero in disguise. She will also cross paths with her real identity of her real mother Magda (Dawn Zulueta) who happens to be Gabriel's adoptive mother.

== Cast and characters ==
=== Main cast ===
- Lauren Young as Olivia "Via" Pereira-Amarillo – the main female/primary protagonist of the series, originally portrayed by Claudine Barretto. She is the good daughter of Don Fernando and Magdalena Pereira. Olivia's real name was Angelica, given to her by her biological mother, but as she got raised by her father and her father's wife, she grew up with the name Olivia, or "Via" for short. Later she married Gabriel.
- JM de Guzman as Gabriel Maglayon-Amarillo – the main male protagonist of the series, originally portrayed by Rico Yan. He is the son of Rocco. A kind hearted and hardworking young taxi driver who will do everything to earn the trust of Don Fernando and to prove his love for Olivia Pereira. Later he married Via.
- Enrique Gil as Michael Miranda – the main male protagonist of the series, originally portrayed by Diether Ocampo. Via's friend, he had special feelings for her.

=== Supporting cast ===
- Dawn Zulueta as Magdalena "Magda" Trinidad-Pereira – the secondary female protagonist of the series, originally portrayed by Jaclyn Jose. The lost mother of Via. She fell in love with Don Fernando and she has a scar face after surviving an acid attack by Selina. Later she married Don Fernando.
- Eula Valdez as Selina Pereira-Matias – the main female/primary antagonist of the series, originally portrayed by Princess Punzalan. She is the sister of Don Fernando, however, she is not his biological sister. She is clever, quick-thinking, and intelligent, but at the same time evil scheme, greedy, and merciless to others especially having deep revenge, and a grudge she held over Magda. She perpetrated the acid attack which left a scar on Magda's face. She married Ysmael and had a daughter named Nicole and an older son named Gilbert. One day trying to kill Via, she saw Nicole in the bus with bombs and she was killed instead. Selina got severely burned after finding Nicole inside the exploded bus. In the end, she was killed by a speeding dump truck while showing her pride and quarreling with her neighbors. As she was dying bloodily, the flashbacks of the painful past that happened to her and the horrible crimes she did were seen.
- Ariel Rivera as Don Fernando Pereira – the secondary male protagonist of the series, originally portrayed by Juan Rodrigo. Via's father who lives a full life of deceit by his adoptive sister Selina and will face the truth amidst of it all that he and Magda are still meant to be after so many trials and tribulations.
- Charee Pineda as Katherine "Kate" Dela Cruz/Sister Katherine – She treats Ninong as her father. She later fell in love with Gabriel. And later, she became a nun.
- DJ Durano as Ysmael Matias – Selina's husband.
- Tyron Perez as Gilbert Matias – Ysmael's son and Nicole's half-brother. His love interest is Via.
- Cris Villanueva as Rocco Amarillo – The biological father of Gabriel who saved the life of Magda. He died after being shot by Selina. He is buried beside his wife at the family ranch.
- Sue Anne Ramirez as Nicole Matias – Ysmael and Selina's loving daughter, towards the end of the series, she rebels against her parents and joins Via. However, she dies in a bus accident on the way to Baguio, after an explosion, which was meant to kill Via. The bomb was placed directly near their seat, thus killing everyone on the bus.
- Minco Fabregas as Atty. Samuel Miranda – The father of Michael and a friend of Don Fernando.
- Rochelle Barrameda as Monique Miranda – The mother of Michael.
- Neri Naig as Jaja Lampaz/Fake Selina – Selina had her face changed to look like her.
- Paul Salas as Warren Maglayon – Magda's son and Gabriel's brother. He falls in love with Nicole.

=== Special participation ===
- Assunta De Rossi as Criselda Pereira
- Alicia Alonzo as Minerva Trinidad
- Lito Legaspi as Luis Vergara
- John Arcilla as Don Fernando Pereira Sr.
- Devon Seron as Mariel
- Rubi Rubi as Tindeng
- Kristel Fulgar as teen Selina Pereira
- Mark Sayarot as teen Don Fernando Pereira Jr.
- Sophia Baars as Young Olivia Pereira
- Joseph Andre Garcia as Young Gabriel Maglayon
- Bobby Yan as Lando
- Manuel Chua as Armando "Abdon" Macasaet

== Differences between the original and remake ==
| Scene | Original version (TV version) | Remake version |
|---|---|---|
| Criselda's death | Criselda died of cancer. | Selina murdered Criselda after Criselda excluded her from her will. |
| Selina's first crime | Selina commanded that Mariel, Elena, and Elaine be subjected to torture and sexual assault. | Mariel, Elena and Elaine were absent in the remake. Selina's first crime was that she let her dogs chase Minerva away, causing her death. |
| Gabriel's biological kin | It is revealed that Gabriel's biological father is the wealthy Don Ricardo. | Rocco is Gabriel's biological father. |
| Ella Peralta's identity | Via assumed the identity of Ella Peralta following the bus explosion. | Ella Peralta's identity remained undisclosed due to the bus explosion occurring during the finale. |
| Jennifer and Connie | Jennifer was Ysmael and Connie's daughter. | Connie and Jennifer's characters were not part of the series |
| Trina | Via's best friend, Trina, was in love with Michael. | Trina's character was not part of the series. |
| Gilbert and Ysmael's paternity | Gilbert was Ysmael's eldest illegitimate child. | Gilbert was Selina and Ysmael's son. |
| Gilbert's task | As Via's bodyguard, Gilbert was also tasked with gathering information about her and reporting back to Selina. | Gilbert had a crush on Via, but was never ordered by Selina to spy on Via. |
| Selina's ailment | Selina was diagnosed with lymphoma cancer during the series. | Selina did not have cancer. |
| Carmen, Rafael, and berta | After the bus explosion, Carmen, Rafael, and Berta found Via disoriented in a church. | Carmen, Rafael and Berta's characters were not part of the series. |
| Selina's relation | Selina is Don Fernando's half-sister, born to his father's mistress. | Selina and Don Fernando share a bond as adoptive siblings. |
| Selina's parents | Don Fernando and Selina's parents were not part of the series. | Selina's biological mother, along with Don Fernando's parents, Blanca and Don Fernando Pereira Sr., were included in the series. |
| Gabriel's siblings | Gabriel had a half-brother named Leo. | Gabriel did not have any biological siblings. |
| Warren | Warren, the son of Corazon and Benjamin, was Gabriel's half-brother. | Magda took Gabriel and Warren under her wing after finding them homeless on the streets. |
| Warren's family | Corazon, Benjamin, Ton Ton, and Eduard were members of Warren's family. | Warren had no biological family. |
| Magda's brother | Manuel, Magda's brother, was a serial killer | Magda did not have a brother. |
| Magda's mother | Magda did not have a mother. | Minerva is Magda's mother. |
| Ysmael's demise | Ysmael was murdered by Selina after attempting to aid Via and Magda in escaping his wife's schemes. | Ysmael was alive throughout the series and attended the double wedding of Via and Gabriel and Magda and Fernando. |
| Selina's kidnapping | Selina kidnapped Via and Magda for a P50 million ransom. | Selina held Gabriel, Via, Magda, and Don Fernando hostage, demanding the Pereira family's entire fortune. |
| Lando | Lando sexually assaulted Mariel. | Lando was Mariel and Neal's friend. |
| Wendy | Wendy, a member of Gabriel's friend group, harbors a crush on him. | While Wendy harbors a crush on Gabriel, Kate was the primary rival for Via's affections. |
| Selina kills Tindeng | Selina, Tindeng's boss, attempted to murder her after Tindeng learned too many of her secrets. | This storyline was not included. |
| Nicole's death | Manuel murdered Nicole after she and her half-sister, Jennifer, attempted to escape him. | Nicole was killed in the bus explosion. |
| Embezzler | Attorney Miranda, Michael's father, embezzled funds from Don Fernando's company. | This storyline was not included. |
| Selina kills who? | Selina shot Magda in the back as she and Via attempted to escape. | Fernando was stabbed and tortured by Selina. |
| Warren's love interest | Jowie was Warren's love interest. | Nicole was Warren's love interest. |
| Selina kidnaps who | Selina ordered the kidnapping of Via's daughter, Magdalena. | Via did not have a daughter. |
| Selina's manipulation | Selina manipulated Criselda, convincing her that separating Via from Magda was the only way to win back Fernando's love. | Driven by fear for Via and Magda's lives, Criselda decided to adopt Via after learning of Selina's plan to kill them. |
| Bagyo | Bagyo rescued Selina from the car explosion after Via intentionally crashed her vehicle into a carinderia. | This storyline was not included. |
| Selina's face injuries | Selina's face was severely burned in the car explosion. | Selina's severe facial burns were a consequence of her desperate attempt to rescue her daughter, Nicole, from the burning bus. |
| Selina's laughter | Witnessing the fiery explosion of the bus, Selina let out a triumphant, spine-chilling laugh, believing she had finally eliminated Via. | Selina's signature evil laugh, though absent from the series after her daughter Nicole perished in the explosion, chillingly echoed in the trailer and resurfaced whenever she orchestrated her malevolent schemes. Deramas eliminated the bus explosion laughter in line with the rewriting of Selina as a tragic antagonist. |
| Michael's demise | Bagyo killed Michael after he saved Via and her daughter from being shot. | Michael remained alive throughout the series. |
| Michael's marriage | Michael married Trina after she revealed her pregnancy, and subsequently fell in love with her. | Michael remained single throughout the series. |
| Who saved Via | Gabriel and Warren both saved Via. | Via was only saved by Gabriel. |
| Selina's medical treatment | After receiving ₱1 million from Fernando, Selina underwent plastic surgery to repair the injuries she sustained in the car explosion. | Selina did not undergo plastic surgery. |
| Selina's death | Selina's life was cut short when she fell from a building and was subsequently struck and fatally injured by a speeding flatbed truck. | Engrossed in a heated confrontation with her neighbors, Selina was oblivious to the approaching dump truck, resulting in a hit and run with the vehicle; the force of the impact causes her death. |
| Fight between Selina and Via | In a climactic confrontation shortly before her death, Selina and Via engaged in a fierce duel within the desolate confines of an abandoned construction site. | This storyline was not included. |
| Shirley | Shirley, consumed by jealousy towards Via (Ella), harbored a secret love for Rafael, making her a formidable rival. | Shirley's character was not included. |
| Who shot Ricardo | Gabriel's father, Ricardo, was accidentally shot by Leo. | Rocco was shot by Selina after protecting Gabriel. |
| Gabriel | Leo is Gabriel's half-brother. | Gabriel's only biological family is his father, Rocco. |
| | The bus explosion was followed by Magda's heart-wrenching cries, her belief that Via had been lost in the fiery wreckage leaving her utterly devastated. | Magda, along with Gabriel, was deeply affected by the devastating explosion. |
| How was Warren found | As a child, Warren was entrusted to Magda's care by his mother, Corazon. | Magda found Gabriel and Warren living on the streets and adopted them. |

== Trivia ==
- In the adaptation, there were no additional characters compared to the original.
- This is Lauren Young's big break in showbiz and her last show with ABS-CBN before moving to GMA Network in 2012.
- This is Eula Valdez, Ariel Rivera, and Cris Villanueva's comeback show on ABS-CBN after they left GMA Network in 2010 and 2011.
- Ariel Rivera and Michael "Eagle" Riggs were part of the 1997 cast while Eula Valdez was part of the movie version.
- This is Tyron Perez's last show, before his death in December 2011.
- This is Dawn Zulueta's comeback drama after three years, following "Mars Ravelo's 'Lastikman'" in 2007.

== See also ==
- List of programs broadcast by ABS-CBN
- List of ABS-CBN Studios original drama series
- Mula sa Puso
