= Jessy Mendiola =

Filipino actress (born 1992)

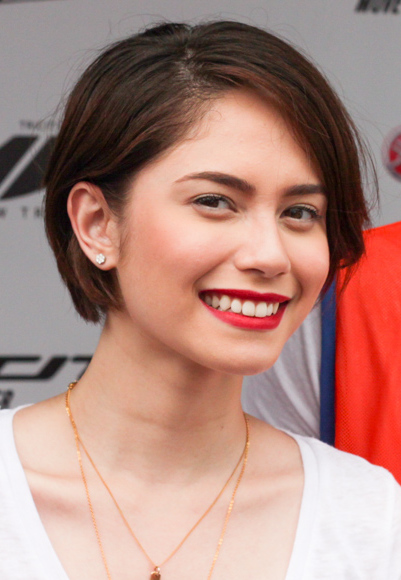
- Mendiola in January 2015
- Born: Jessica Mendiola Tawile; December 3, 1992 (age 33); Dubai, United Arab Emirates
- Occupation: Actress
- Years active: 2004–present
- Agent: Star Magic (2007–2019; 2024–present)
- Spouse: Luis Manzano (m. 2021)
- Partner: JM de Guzman (2011–2013)
- Children: 1
- Relatives: Vilma Santos (mother-in-law); Edu Manzano (father-in-law); Ralph Recto (stepfather-in-law); Ryan Recto (half-brother-in-law); Diego Aspiras (half-brother-in-law)

Jessy Mendiola-Manzano (Tagalog pronunciation: [mɛnˈdjɔla]; born Jessica Mendiola Tawile; December 3, 1992) is a Filipino actress. She first appeared in TV commercials and ventured acting at age 13, portraying minor roles in several soap operas. In 2007, she was officially launched as part of ABS-CBN's Star Magic Batch 15. In the succeeding years, she played supporting roles in a series of television shows including Natutulog Ba Ang Diyos? (2007), Dyosa (2008), and Kung Tayo’y Magkakalayo (2010) among others. She eventually became a household name for leading several hit series like Sabel (2010), Budoy (2011), Paraiso (2012) and Maria Mercedes (2013). She also had a slew of film stints, the most notable being The Reunion (2012), Call Center Girl (2013), The Trial (2014) and The Girl in the Orange Dress (2018).

Mendiola's repertoire earned her several recognitions including the 'German Moreno Youth Achievement Award' at the 2012 FAMAS Awards. She was the first Filipino recipient of the 'Best Asia Pacific Star' at the 5th Asia Pacific Actors Network (APAN) Star Awards in South Korea. She was also included for three consecutive years (2017–19) in TC Candler's list of the “Most Beautiful Faces in the World”. FHM Philippines hailed her as the "Sexiest Woman of 2016".

== Early life ==
Jessica Mendiola Tawile was born in Dubai, where her father once worked. She is the second of three daughters born to Filipino mother Judith Mendiola and Lebanese father Roger Tawile. She was three years old when her mother Judith moved to the Philippines after her father's infidelity, bringing along her and her elder sister, Pamela. Jessy's younger sister Megan was born in Mexico, where her parents reconciled, but eventually separated again for unknown reasons. She remains in contact with her father, who works overseas as a marine anthropologist. She studied mass communication at Far Eastern University.

== Career ==
Jessy Mendiola was one of the 18 new talents launched by ABS-CBN under Star Magic Batch 15. She, along with Megan Young, Alfonso Martinez, Carlo Guevarra and her Star Magic batchmates, joined the cast of Star Magic Presents: Abt Ur Luv, when it was revamped to Abt Ur Luv Ur Lyf 2 in 2007. She also had a minor role in Sineserye Presents: Natutulog Ba ang Diyos?.

In 2008, she was cast as Chappy Girl in the TV series Volta, which was adapted from the Star Cinema film of the same name.

In 2010, she had a guest appearance in George and Cecil, playing the love interest of Dino Imperial's Jun. Mendiola revealed that she was pulled out of Habang May Buhay and was cast as Christina in the TV series Kung Tayo'y Magkakalayo instead. Mendiola was supposed to appear in Habang May Buhay and was featured in the 2008 trailer of the show which was originally titled as Humingi Ako sa Langit. The TV series, which was supposed to air in 2008, was cancelled, reshot and recast. Due to good feedback, her one-week guest appearance in Kung Tayo'y Magkakalayo was extended. She was later cast in Your Song Presents: Gimik 2010, playing the role of the reformed rebel teenager Jessy. Mendiola was supposed to appear in Kokey @ Ako, opposite Enrique Gil, but their characters were written off in favor of Melai Cantiveros and Jason Francisco. She eventually returned as a recurring character in the last few episodes of Kung Tayo'y Magkakalayo.

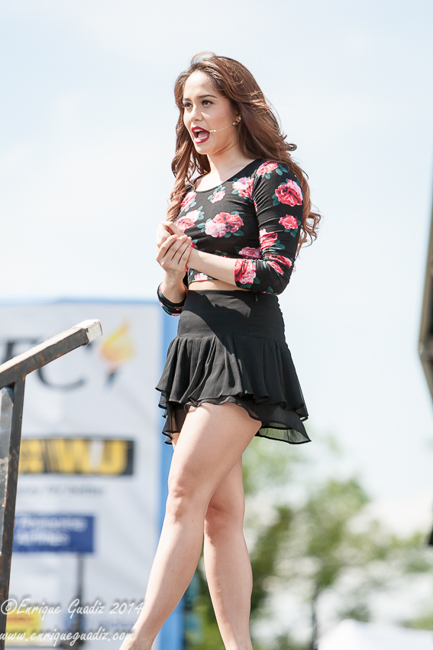
Mendiola performing at the 2014 London Barrio Fiesta

She portrayed lead roles in Maalaala Mo Kaya: "Marriage Contract" and in Wansapanataym: "Kakambal Ko'y Manika". Her first biggest break was playing the title role in the afternoon TV show, Sabel.

In 2011, when Sabel ended, Mendiola joined ASAP Rocks. She, along with Empress Schuck, Enchong Dee and Sam Concepcion, are referred to as ASAP's 'Dance Quad'. Earlier, she portrayed Isabel Valderama in Agimat: Ang Mga Alamat ni Ramon Revilla Presents: Bianong Bulag. In April, she became a guest judge for It's Showtime and appeared as Risa in the Maalaala Mo Kaya episode, "Medalyon". She also played the role of Jacqueline Marasigan in the primetime TV show, Budoy, opposite Gerald Anderson and Enrique Gil.

In 2012, she starred in the film The Reunion, with Enchong Dee, Enrique Gil and Xian Lim. She also starred in the afternoon TV show Precious Hearts Romances Presents: Paraiso, with Matteo Guidicelli, Matt Evans and Jewel Mische.

In 2013, Mendiola played the titular role in the Philippine remake of Maria Mercedes. In October, she flew to South Korea for a ceremonial appointment by Korea Tourism Organization as the Honorary Ambassador for Korean Tourism.

In 2015, Mendiola played another lead role in the comedy drama Must Date the Playboy, alongside Kim Chiu, Xian Lim and Matt Evans. and in the romantic family drama You're My Home, alongside Dawn Zulueta, Richard Gomez and JC de Vera.

In 2016, Mendiola was recognized as the No. 1 Sexiest Woman in the Philippines by the men's magazine FHM Philippines. She landed fourth place in the same list of sexiest women in the Philippines the following year.

In 2024, after a five-year hiatus, she signed a contract with ABS-CBN and Star Magic. On April 25, 2026, Mendiola and Vilma Santos participated as co-contestants in the premiere episode of the revival of Kapamilya Deal or No Deal, where they won ₱125,000 for their charities.

== Personal life ==
On December 12, 2020, Mendiola became engaged to television host Luis Manzano. The two had been dating since June 2016. Mendiola and Manzano were married on February 21, 2021, in a civil wedding in Lipa, Batangas, officiated by the city mayor. In 2023, she gave birth to a daughter.

On February 15, 2024, Mendiola and Manzano had their church wedding in Coron, Palawan.

== Filmography ==
=== Film ===
Year	Title	Role
2012	The Reunion	Ali Zaldariaga
2013	Call Center Girl	Regina "Reg" Manlapat
2014	The Trial	Isabelle "Bessy" Bernardo
2015	Must Date The Playboy	Chloe Santillan
2016	Mano Po 7: Tsinoy	Jocelyn Lee
2017	Extra Service	Genevieve/Henya
2018	The Girl in the Orange Dress	Anna Villegas
2019	'Tol	Elena
2019	Stranded	Julia
2019	Mga Mata sa Dilim	Sui

=== Television ===
Year	Title	Role	Notes	Source
2004	Hanggang Kailan	Gina		
2007	Star Magic Presents: Abt Ur Luv Ur Lyf 2	Lheny		
2007	Sineserye Presents: Natutulog Ba Ang Diyos?	Michelle		
2008	Your Song Presents: Bakit Labis Kitang Mahal	Kitty		
2008	Volta	Chappy Girl		
2008	Star Magic Presents: Astigs In Luvin lyf	Shannon		
2008	Dyosa	Cheepa/Hiyas		
2008	Maalaala Mo Kaya	Darlene's classmate	Episode: "Mansyon"	
2008–2019; 2024–present	ASAP	Herself — Host / Performer		
2009	Your Song Presents: Boystown	Karen		
2009	Maalaala Mo Kaya	Samantha Espiritu	Episode: "Taxi"	
2009	Midnight DJ	Gabby	Episode: "Pabrika Ng Multo"	
2009	Maalaala Mo Kaya	Hershey	Episode: "Storybook"	
2009	George and Cecil	Irene		
2009	Katorse	Bettina Godinez		
2010	May Bukas Pa	Young Soledad	Special participation	
2010	Kung Tayo'y Magkakalayo	Christina Angeles		
2010	Your Song Presents: Gimik 2010	Jessy Lorenzo		
2010	Maalaala Mo Kaya	Analyn "Ana" Dela Cruz	Episode: "Marriage Contract"	
2010	Wansapanataym	Leni/Lena Gatchalian	Episode: "Kambal Ko'y Manika"	
2010	Banana Split	Herself	Guest, 1 episode	
2010–11	Sabel	Sabel Asuncion		
2011–12	Agimat: Ang Mga Alamat ni Ramon Revilla: Bianong Bulag	Isabel Robles		
2011	Maalaala Mo Kaya	Lisa	Episode: "Medalyon"	
2011	Banana Split	Darlene Belangoy Jr.	Guest	
2011	Wansapanataym	Mylene	Episode: "Flores De Mayumi"	
2011	Maalaala Mo Kaya	Laurence Trazona	Episode: "Bisikleta"	
2011–12	Budoy	Jacqueline "Jackie" Marasigan		
2012	Maalaala Mo Kaya	Joei Revilleza	Episode: "Journal"	
2012	E-Boy	Adult Princess		
2012–13	Precious Hearts Romances Presents: Paraiso	Yanie Alipio		
2012	KBS World Date with Shinee	Herself	Guest	
2013–14	Maria Mercedes	Maria Mercedes Alegre		
2014	Maalaala Mo Kaya	Marie	Episode: "Sulat"?	
2015	Maalaala Mo Kaya	Cecile	Episode: "Sapatos"	
2015–16	You're My Home	Grace Fontanilla		
2015–2017	Banana Sundae			
2016	Wansapanataym	Isabel	Episode: "Just Got Laki"	
2016	Maalaala Mo Kaya	Christina	Episode: "Pole"	
2017	Maalaala Mo Kaya	Lyka	Episode: "Makeup"	
2017	Maalaala Mo Kaya	Juliet/Erna	Episode: "Tulay"	
2018	FPJ's Ang Probinsyano	Andrea "Andi" B. Collins / Violett		
2019–2020	Sandugo	Melissa Pamintuan		
2020	Fit for Life	Herself	Host	
2022	I Can See Your Voice	Herself	Guest Singvestigator	
2025	Sins of the Father	Agnes Policarpio		
2026	Kapamilya Deal or No Deal	Herself	Partnered with Vilma Santos	
