= Manuel Chua =

Filipino actor and model

Member of the San Jose City Council
- Incumbent
- Assumed office June 30, 2022

Personal details
- Born: Manuel Garchitorena Chua Jr. October 29, 1980 (age 46) Cabanatuan, Nueva Ecija, Philippines
- Party: PDP–Laban (2022–present)
- Occupation: Actor, model, businessman, politician

Manuel Garchitorena Chua (born October 29, 1980) is a Filipino model, actor, businessman, and politician.

== Early life and background ==
Chua was Born in Cabanatuan, Nueva Ecija, Philippines where he lived a quiet life managing a small appliance retail store and raising a young daughter before rising to fame.

== Acting career ==
He was discovered in the Filipino version of a reality game show, Pinoy Fear Factor, which aired on ABS-CBN from November 2008 to February 2009, wherein he reportedly broke two of the show's world records. Chua is currently a contract artist for ABS-CBN's Star Magic.

== Political career ==
Chua ran for member of city council of San Jose, Nueva Ecija in the 2022 elections under PDP–Laban, wherein he was placed sixth.

== Filmography ==
=== Film ===
Year	Title	Role	Ref.
2010	Working Girls	Albert Carascoso	
2010	Till My Heartaches End	Carlo	
2011	Wedding Tayo, Wedding Hindi	Bodyok	
2011	Yesterday, Today, Tomorrow	Vincent's Friend	
2012	This Guy's in Love With U Mare!	Peter	
2013	A Moment in Time	Bodjie	
2013	Bromance: My Brother's Romance	Jerome	
2013	Tuhog	Bobby	
2013	Pagpag: Siyam na Buhay	SPO2 Manlajas	
2014	The Trial	Sheriff	
2014	Moron 5.2: The Transformation	Thomas	
2015	You're Still The One	Ariel	
2015	Etiquette for Mistresses	Manuel	
2015	Everyday I Love You	Alfred	
2016	Just the 3 of Us	AJ Manalo	
2016	Vince and Kath and James	Victor	
2018	I Love You, Hater	Rigor Macaraeg	
2019	The Annulment	Ben	
2021	Momshies! Ang Soul Mo'y Akin!	JB	
2022	Labyu with an Accent	Jordan	
2025	The Delivery Rider	Coach	

=== Television ===
Year	Title	Role	Ref.
2008–2009	Pinoy Fear Factor	Contestant	
2008–present	ASAP XP	Himself / Performer	
2009	George and Cecil	Jojo Samortin	
2009	Precious Hearts Romances Presents: Bud Brothers	Ed Lacson	
2009	Precious Hearts Romances Presents: Ang Lalaking Nagmahal Sa Akin	Mando	
2009	Maalaala Mo Kaya: Salamin	Dionisio	
2009	Lovers in Paris	Albert Samaniego	
2010	Precious Hearts Romances Presents: The Substitute Bride	Carlo	
2010	Maalaala Mo Kaya: Shell	Bong	
2010	Precious Hearts Romances Presents: Impostor	Albert	
2010	1DOL	Attorney	
2010	Maalaala Mo Kaya	Jepoy	
2010–2011	Imortal	Diego	
2010–2011	Precious Hearts Romances Presents: Kristine	Scarlet's ex-boyfriend	
2011	Maalaala Mo Kaya: Kwintas	–	
2011	Mula sa Puso	Armando "Abdon" Macasaet	
2011	Laugh Out Loud		
2011	Maalaala Mo Kaya: Tindahan	Chris	
2011	Guns and Roses	Young Arnel Intalan	
2011	Reputasyon	Marco Olivar	
2011	Maalaala Mo Kaya: Itak	Janno	
2011	Maria la del Barrio	Roel	
2011–2015	Banana Split	Various Roles	
2012	Wako Wako	Mr. Lee	
2012	Walang Hanggan	Dindo	
2012	Precious Hearts Romances Presents: Hiyas	Young Lucio	
2012	Princess and I	Ahmet	
2012	Precious Hearts Romances Presents: Pintada	Dante	
2012	Precious Hearts Romances Presents: Paraiso	Versoza	
2012–2013	Kahit Puso'y Masugatan	Jeff	
2013	Apoy sa Dagat	Young Benedict	
2013	Wansapanataym: Teacher's Pest	–	
2013	Maalaala Mo Kaya: Hair Clip	Arvin	
2013	Maalaala Mo Kaya: Drawing	Jose	
2013	Got to Believe	Sir Funye	
2013	Bukas na Lang Kita Mamahalin	Marcus'men	
2014	The Legal Wife	Young Ronnie	
2014	Hawak-Kamay	Arnold	
2014	Ipaglaban Mo: Ang Lahat Ng Sa Akin	Jojo Valencia	
2015	Bridges of Love	Abner	
2015	Nathaniel	Gun Man	
2016	FPJ's Ang Probinsyano	Zaldy	
2016	Maalaala Mo Kaya: Pintura	Andres	
2016–2017	Magpahanggang Wakas	Kyle	
2017	Maalaala Mo Kaya: Tahanan	Ramon	
2017	D' Originals	Raul	
2017–2018	Pusong Ligaw	Marcus	
2018	Bagani	Tawong Lipod	
2018	Sana Dalawa ang Puso	Emil	
2018	Ngayon at Kailanman	Joey Bartolome	
2018	Maalaala Mo Kaya: Dalandan	Jojit	
2018	Tadhana: Tukso	Li Jie	
2019	Ipaglaban Mo: Akusasyon	SP04 Jacobe	
2019	Hiwaga ng Kambat	Berting	
2019	Precious Hearts Romances Presents: Los Bastardos	Ernesto	
2019	Maalaala Mo Kaya: Palangke	Gary	
2019	Nang Ngumiti ang Langit	Erwin	
2019–2020	The Killer Bride	Matias Gonzales	
2020	Sandugo	NBI Agent Buencamino	
2020	A Soldier's Heart	Young Victor	
2020–2021	Ang sa Iyo ay Akin	Jared "Red" Adonis	
2021	Gen Z	Jeff Yu	
2021	Maalaala Mo Kaya: Jacket	Jun	
2021	Init sa Magdamag	Joko	
2022–2023	The Iron Heart	Romulo Gimenez	
2024	Tadhana: Sugar Daddy	Joselito Landicho	
2025	Sins of the Father	Vince	
2026	Blood vs Duty	young Apo	
2026	The Loyalty Game	Gomez	
