= Erika Padilla =

Filipino actress, model, and host (born 1986)

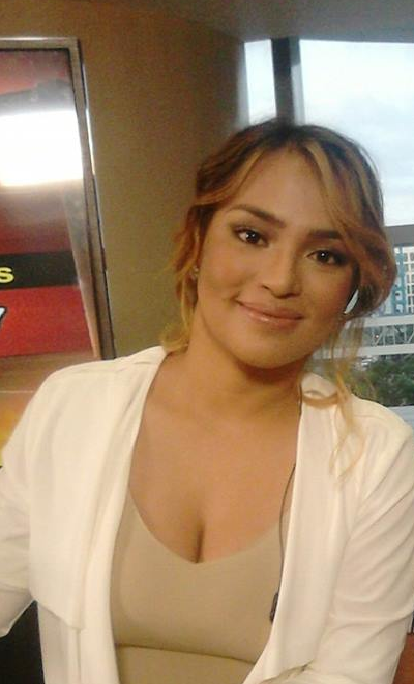
- Born: November 22, 1986 (age 39); Marikina, Philippines
- Education: Ateneo de Manila University
- Occupations: Actress, TV host, sideline reporter
- Years active: 2008–present
- Agent: Star Magic (2008–2011)
- Spouse: Jeffrey Cariaso (m. 2017)
- Children: 2

Erika Padilla Cariaso (born November 22, 1986) is a Filipino actress, TV host, model and sideline reporter.

== Early life ==
Padilla's father is General Ricardo Ilagan Padilla, a former regional director of Region 4 Calabarzon and the incumbent Mayor of Bongabon, Nueva Ecija. Her mother is a businesswoman and a former dancer and singer.

She attended the Ateneo de Manila University where he obtained a degree in political science.

== Career ==
In 2008, Padilla joined the Miss Bikini Philippines pageant where she won the Miss Photogenic award. She and the other contestants of the pageant made a guest appearance on the TV show Wowowee. In the show, she met Johnny Manahan, who offered her to audition for Star Magic. Before signing up with Star Magic, and eventually launching as a member of Star Magic Batch 16, Padilla did several modelling stints. She was part of Metro magazine's top 10 models in the Philippines.

Padilla appeared as a court side reporter for the PBA on TV5, her first project outside the Kapamilya network. She was the backstage host of Killer Karaoke: Pinoy Naman. She also played supporting roles in some of the network's shows. She still appeared in ABS-CBN shows like A Beautiful Affair and Maria Mercedes.

She is currently a freelance actress/television host signed to Vidanes Artist Management.

In 2014, she joined GMA Network for the first time and appeared in Kambal Sirena and Ang Lihim ni Annasandra.

After doing projects with GMA Network, she played Betty Mae Versales in the 2015 version of Pangako Sa 'Yo aired on ABS-CBN. The show ran from May 2015 to February 2016.

During 2016, she returned to GMA Network as part of the rom-com - drama series, Juan Happy Love Story.

As of 2017, Padilla is currently seen on ABS-CBN shows and programs.

== Personal life ==
Padilla is married former Alaska Aces star and former head coach Jeff Cariaso in 2017. They have a son and a daughter.

== Filmography ==
=== Television ===
Year	Title	Role	Notes	Source
2009	I Love Betty La Fea	Herself / Ecomodel	Cameo	
2009	Precious Hearts Romances Presents: Bud Brothers Series	Jennifer		
2009	Dahil May Isang Ikaw	Jannelle Paez		
2009	Precious Hearts Romances Presents: Somewhere in My Heart	Amy		
2010	Habang May Buhay	Michiko	Special Participation	
2010	Kung Tayo'y Magkakalayo	Diane		
2010	Magkano ang Iyong Dangal?	Jenny		
2010	Maalaala Mo Kaya	Rosa	Episode: "Gitara"	
2010–11	Imortal	Miriam Villamor		
2011	Iskul Bukol	Joseph Dizon		
2011	Reputasyon	Precious		
2011	Maria la del Barrio	Liz		
2011–12	The Jose and Wally Show Starring Vic Sotto	Erika		
2011–17	PBA on Sports5	Herself	Courtside reporter	
2012	A Beautiful Affair	Dr. Trina Cawagas		
2013	Kidlat	Chichi		
2013	Maria Mercedes	Lou		
2013	Killer Karaoke: Pinoy Naman	Herself - Erika Kalurka		
2014	Kambal Sirena	Gigi		
2014	Eat Bulaga Lenten Special: Pangalawang Bukas	Wife of Jose Manalo		
2014	Ang Lihim ni Annasandra	Rebecca "Becca" Sanchez		
2015–16	Pangako Sa 'Yo	Betty Mae Verseles		
2016	Juan Happy Love Story	Joy		
2017	A Love to Last	Melissa		
2018	La Luna Sangre	Miriam Villamor		
2018	Ngayon at Kailanman	Mariel Saavedra		
2022	K-Love	Bianca		

=== Film ===
Year	Title	Role	Notes	Source
2010	Ang Tanging Ina Mo (Last na 'To!)	Nora		
2011	Six Degrees of Separation from Lilia Cuntapay	Special appearance		
2011	Segunda Mano	Ivan's stepmother		
2011	Enteng ng Ina Mo	Nora		
2013	My Little Bossings	Leni		
2013	She's the One	Jessie		
2015	Must Date the Playboy	Joy		
2016	The Achy Breaky Hearts	Maxie		
2017	Can We Still Be Friends			
2019	Open	Shiela		
2019	The Annulment	Lorie		
