= Hiyas =

- Genre: Drama
- Created by: Sofia
- Based on: Silang, The Fierce Warrior by Sofia
- Developed by: ABS-CBN Studios
- Written by: Manny Buising; Ruby Leah Castro; Agnes De Guzman; Ruel Montañez
- Directed by: Adolfo Alix, Jr.; Theodore Boborol; Catherine O. Camarillo
- Starring: Zanjoe Marudo; Megan Young
- Theme music composer: Juris Fernandez
- Opening theme: "Di Lang Ikaw" by Erik Santos
- Country of origin: Philippines
- Original language: Filipino
- No. of episodes: 35

Production
- Executive producers: Carlo Katigbak; Cory Vidanes; Laurenti Dyogi
- Producer: Katrina Juban
- Production location: Philippines
- Cinematography: Albert Banzon; Tey Clamor; Rommel Sales
- Editors: Sonny De Jesus Bren John De Leon; Ayen Del Carmen; Gibard Guifaya; Odinthor Lazatin; Lara Theresa Linsangan; Michael Maarinas
- Running time: 30-45 minutes Weekdays at 17:00 (PST)
- Production company: LMD Unit

Original release
- Network: ABS-CBN
- Release: May 28 – July 13, 2012

Related
- Precious Hearts Romances Presents: Lumayo Ka Man Sa Akin; Precious Hearts Romances Presents: Pintada

Hiyas (lit. 'Gem') is a 2012 Philippine television drama series broadcast by ABS-CBN. The series is based on the Filipino pocket book novel Silang, The Fierce Warrior by Sofia, the series is the sixteenth installment of Precious Hearts Romances Presents. Directed by Adolfo Alix, Jr., Theodore Boborol and Catherine O. Camarillo, it stars Zanjoe Marudo and Megan Young. It aired on the network's Kapamilya Gold line up and worldwide on TFC from May 28 to July 13, 2012, replacing Wako Wako and was replaced by Precious Hearts Romances Presents: Pintada.

The series was marked for the third anniversary installment of the Precious Hearts Romances television adaptations for giving Three Years of Many Top Rating Serials and is the first adaptation to have a Fantasy Action Adventure for Television under 'Precious Hearts Romances' television distribution.

== Synopsis ==
Silang is, a fierce warrior from the ethnic group Tanah, The begotten son of Lucio and Salve who is prophesied to bring the long-lost mythical precious gem in Tanah which is believed that will bring prosperity and reconciliation between the two raging clans of Lucio and Biano.

He fell in love and set to marry his childhood sweetheart Giana, daughter of Biano, if and only if Silang brings the precious gem in Tanah. This is the only condition given by Biano for Silang before they get married.

As Silang journeys in the city to unfold the mystery of the missing precious gem, he will meet Sapphire Salvador. She is a very sophisticated but charitable woman and will soon marry an eligible bachelor, Aldrich Zaragosa, who is oddly missing on their wedding day. Sapphire is also the unica hija of the owner of Gemini Industries, Donato Salvador who is associated and lead to the missing precious gem.

Silang and Sapphire will go hand-in-hand in search for the truth about the precious gem. Through Sapphire, Silang's quest for 'hiyas' will fall into his hand as the two went into life-threatening danger. Thus, what they've been through will draw their hearts close to each other.

== Cast and characters ==
=== Main cast ===
- Zanjoe Marudo as Silang
- Megan Young as Sapphire Salvador
- Edward Mendez as Aldrich Zaragoza
- Mercedes Cabral as Giana
- John Arcilla as Donato Salvador
- Tetchie Agbayani as Elizabeth Salvador
- Jong Cuenco as David Zaragoza
- Angel Jacob as Rina Zaragoza
- Sharmaine Suarez as Legay
- Nonie Buencamino as Biano
- Allan Paule as Lucio

=== Supporting cast ===
- Neri Naig as Laura
- Tess Antonio as Isay
- Archie Alemania as Karel
- Lemuelle Pelayo as Raon
- Kristel Moreno as Portia
- Dionne Monsanto as Gemma
- Cara Eriguel as Lenny
- Joe Gruta as Apo Asig
- Bjorn Aguilar as Langkawan
- Alizon Andres as Nestor
- Joross Gamboa as Evan
- Johan Santos as Bimbo
- RJ Calipus as Alex

=== Special participation ===
- Maliksi Morales as young Silang
- Maurice Mabutas as young Sapphire
- Phebe Kay Arbotante as young Giana
- Joem Bascon as young Biano
- Manuel Chua as young Lucio
- Fredmoore delos Santos as Juanito Razon
- Bangs Garcia as Salve
- Arnold Reyes
- Tanya Gomez

== Trivia ==
- The television series was set in production in mid-2010 and was originally supposed to be released in April 2011 for the Kapamilya Gold line up for its 2nd Anniversary offering but due to numerous schedule conflicts and new lineups of soaps such as Reputasyon and Mula sa Puso it was cancelled. The series was finally decided to be aired on May 28, 2012 after the success of its preceding soap PHR presents: Lumayo Ka Man sa Akin.
- Joem Bascon and Nonie Buencamino who portrayed Biano (as young and old, respectively) played their respective antagonist roles in Walang Hanggan as Tomas and Miguel, respectively.

== Production ==
Hiyas is not available in all ABS-CBN Regional Network Group (now ABS-CBN Regional) channels due to local versions of TV Patrol on the same time slot. Instead a replay of recent broadcasts are shown the next day mostly Tuesdays-Friday and Monday on its morning or afternoon block, depending on the station.

Last July 2016. ABS CBN revived the show by uploading Episode 1-35 on YouTube along with Lumayo Ka Man sa Akin, Pintada, Nasaan Ka, Elisa?, Paraiso and Angelito: Batang Ama.

== See also ==
- Precious Hearts Romances Presents
- List of programs broadcast by ABS-CBN
- List of ABS-CBN Studios original drama series
