= Nay-1-1 =

2012 Philippine television infotainment show

- Title card
- Genre: Infotainment
- Directed by: Louie Ignacio
- Presented by: Jaya; Gladys Reyes
- Country of origin: Philippines
- Original language: Tagalog
- No. of episodes: 35

Production
- Executive producer: Erika De Leon
- Camera setup: Multiple-camera setup
- Running time: 30 minutes
- Production company: GMA Entertainment TV

Original release
- Network: GMA Network
- Release: November 12 – December 28, 2012

Nay-1-1 (transl. mom-1-1) is a 2012 Philippine television infotainment show broadcast by GMA Network. Directed by Louie Ignacio, it is hosted by Jaya and Gladys Reyes. It premiered on November 12, 2012. The show concluded on December 28, 2012, with a total of 35 episodes.

== Ratings ==
Hosts

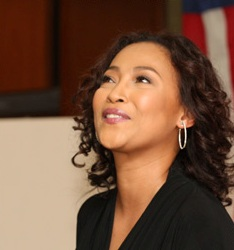
Jaya

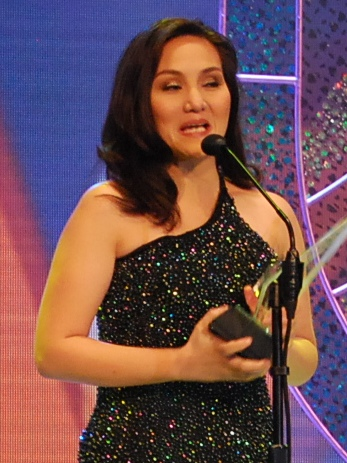
Gladys Reyes

According to AGB Nielsen Philippines' Mega Manila household television ratings, the pilot episode of Nay-1-1 earned a 5.1% rating. The final episode scored a 6.5% rating.
