= Toink =

- Also known as: Toink! Sino Ang Tama?
- Genre: Game show
- Created by: Associated Broadcasting Company; KB Entertainment Unlimited, Inc.
- Written by: Angel San Jose; Allan Lui Pagkalinawan Jr.
- Directed by: Kitchie Benedicto
- Presented by: Alex Gonzaga; Chris Tiu
- Country of origin: Philippines
- Original language: Tagalog
- No. of seasons: 2
- No. of episodes: 14

Production
- Executive producer: Christine Rosales
- Producer: Kitchie Benedicto
- Editor: Alvin Riego
- Running time: 30 minutes
- Production company: KB Entertainment

Original release
- Network: TV5
- Release: February 12 – May 13, 2012

Toink! Sino Ang Tama? (lit. Who's Right?) is a weekly afternoon game show broadcast TV5. Directed by Kitchie Benedicto, hosted by Alex Gonzaga and Chris Tiu. It aired on the network's Sunday afternoon line up from February 12 to May 13, 2012.

== Mechanics ==
In the first round, the players will have to guess which 'TaKal' got the answer correctly. There are two questions and the player whose guess is right will get 100 points for each.

In the second round, the players will now have to guess who gave a wrong answer among the three. This round is worth 300 points.

In the third round, the players will have to guess correctly whether the person on the street got a right or wrong answer. For each correct answer, the players will get 500 points.

The pair with the higher number of points wins the eliminations and is guaranteed P30,000 pesos in cash. They will also proceed to the jackpot round where they can win the pot money.

In the jackpot round, they would have to pick one TaKal and guess if that person will give a right or wrong answer. If they predicted all three correctly, they win the jackpot and if not, the amount will be added to the pot money.

The game gets hilarious as people caught off-guard on the streets give crazy answers to seemingly easy questions.

The players will have to see through the minds of the TaKals and judge whether they are likely to give a correct or wrong answer.

The viewers and players, alike, will be surprised by how some people are really not as they appear.

== Main hosts ==
- Alex Gonzaga
- Chris Tiu

== Segment hosts ==
- Pretty Trisza
- Gene Padilla

== See also ==
- List of programs broadcast by TV5
