= 5 Girls and a Dad =

- Genre: Drama
- Created by: Eagle Broadcasting Corporation
- Written by: Lualhati Bautista
- Directed by: Elson Montalbo; Ray Duvane de Leon; Rolly Palmes
- Starring: Richard Quan; Precious Lara Quigaman; Dixie Nedic; Kate Nizedel; Abby Quilnat; Chesca Salcedo
- Theme music composer: Adam Diesta
- Ending theme: "Bulong ng Puso" (Instrumental)
- Country of origin: Philippines
- Original languages: Filipino, English
- No. of episodes: 78

Production
- Producer: Elson Montalbo
- Camera setup: Multiple-camera setup
- Running time: 60 minutes

Original release
- Network: Net 25
- Release: January 23 – August 24, 2012

5 Girls and a Dad is a Philippine television drama series created and developed by Lualhati Bautista for Net 25. The family-oriented series features Richard Quan in his first leading television role as Lorenzo Legazpi, a widower raising his five daughters. The show is the first primetime drama series of Eagle Broadcasting Corporation and aired on Net 25 from January 23, 2012, to August 24, 2012.

== Overview ==
=== Synopsis ===
Lorenzo Legazpi ("Enzo") is a taxi operator, devout husband to his wife Veron, and loving father to their daughters Mimay, Anna Liza, Alex and Valerie. When Veron dies giving birth to their fifth daughter Angel, Enzo faces the responsibility of raising their children as a widower.

== Cast and characters ==
=== Main cast ===
- Richard Quan as Lorenzo "Enzo" Legazpi
- Precious Lara Quigaman as Veron Legazpi
- Dixie Nedic as Mimay Legazpi, the eldest of Enzo's daughters
- Kate Nizedel as Anna Liza Legazpi
- Abby Quilnat as Alex Legazpi
- Franchesca Salcedo as Valerie Legazpi, who has autism

=== Extended cast ===
- Leo Martinez as Jupiter, Veron's father
- Vangie Labalan as Venus, Enzo's mother

== See also ==
- List of programs previously broadcast by Net 25
