= @ANCAlerts =

- Titlecard used since October 26, 2015
- Genre: News program, social media
- Created by: ABS-CBN Corporation
- Developed by: ABS-CBN News and Current Affairs
- Presented by: Lexi Schulze
- Country of origin: Philippines
- Original language: English
- No. of episodes: n/a (airs daily)

Production
- Running time: 30 minutes

Original release
- Network: ABS-CBN News Channel
- Release: June 11, 2012 – March 29, 2019

@ANCAlerts (stylized as @ancalerts) is a social media news program of ABS-CBN News Channel in the Philippines which started from ANC’s influential Twitter account that has over 450,000 followers to date, aimed to keep viewers abreast of the hottest social media buzz, user-generated content, "Bayan Mo, iPatrol Mo" stories, and real time feedback from ANC viewers. It airs on weekdays at 5:00 p.m. and anchored by social media enthusiasts Lexi Schulze. It premiere on June 11, 2012. The show concluded on March 29, 2019.

== Anchors ==
- Lexi Schulze

== Former Anchors ==
- TJ Manotoc
- Ai Dela Cruz

== See also ==
- List of programs shown on the ABS-CBN News Channel
- ABS-CBN News Channel

== Notes ==
- https://ph.news.yahoo.com/anc-asserts-stand-accuracy-vs-timeliness-debate-051056864.html
- http://rodmagaru.com/2012/06/06/tv-ancalerts-afternoon-shows-anc/
