= Pintada =

Television series

- Title card
- Genre: Teen drama Romance
- Created by: ABS-CBN Studios
- Based on: Green Meadows by Arielle
- Written by: Kay Brondial; Jessel Duque; Clarissa Estuar; Eduardo Roy; Michael Transfiguracion Emille Joson
- Directed by: Theodore Boborol; Cathy Garcia-Molina; Toto Natividad
- Starring: Denise Laurel; Martin del Rosario
- Opening theme: "Nag-iisang Ikaw" by Christian Bautista
- Composer: Vehnee Saturno
- Country of origin: Philippines
- Original language: Filipino
- No. of episodes: 79

Production
- Executive producers: Carlo Katigbak; Cory Vidanes; Laurenti Dyogi
- Producers: Jovelyn Aberion; Adjanet F. Rase
- Cinematography: Noel Teehankee
- Editors: Peter Ashley Austria; Bernie Diasanta; Gilbard Guifaya; Pamela Katigbak; Rizaldy Mora; Roman Rodriguez III arnold Saclolo
- Running time: 20-30 minutes Weekdays at 5:15PM (PST)
- Production company: Laurenti Magsaysay-Dyogi Unit

Original release
- Network: ABS-CBN
- Release: July 16 – November 2, 2012

Related
- Precious Hearts Romances Presents: Hiyas; Precious Hearts Romances Presents: Paraiso

Pintada (International title: Painted Woman) is a 2012 Philippine television drama series broadcast by ABS-CBN. The series is based on the Filipino pocket book novel Green Meadows by Arielle, the series is the seventeenth installment of Precious Hearts Romances Presents. Directed by Theodore C. Boborol, Cathy Garcia-Molina, and Toto Natividad, it stars Denise Laurel and Martin del Rosario. It aired on the network's Kapamilya Gold line up and worldwide on TFC from July 16 to November 2, 2012, replacing Precious Hearts Romances Presents: Hiyas and was replaced by Precious Hearts Romances Presents: Paraiso.

== Synopsis ==
The show tells the love story of Sev (Martin del Rosario), a high school student and his chemistry teacher, Lysa (Denise Laurel).

Lysa, admired for her beauty, suffers severe burns in a school fire, leaving her emotionally scarred. Accused of causing the fire and having an alleged affair with Mr. Sandejas, Lysa is imprisoned for six years. Upon release, she returns to her hometown seeking to restore her reputation and avenge those responsible for her suffering.

== Cast and characters ==
=== Main cast ===
- Denise Laurel as Alysa "Lysa" Alvarez
- Martin del Rosario as Severino "Sev" Monzon
- Lemuel Pelayo as Noel Crisostomo / Joseph Sandejas

=== Supporting cast ===
- Alma Concepcion as Carolina Monzon
- Ricardo Cepeda as Alberto "Albert" Sandejas
- Nikka Valencia as Lorena Alvarez
- Bernadette Allyson as Karen Sandejas
- Lorenzo Mara as Victor Dela Cruz
- Chase Vega as Taylor Alvarez
- Trina Legaspi as Isabel "Isay" Alvarez
- Yen Santos as Samantha Diño
- Eslove Briones as Dave Dela Cruz
- Deniesse Joaquin as Jing Briones
- Jommy Teotico as Edward Pascual
- Jess Mendoza as Arturo "Atong" Policarpio
- James Reid as Vito
- Erin Ocampo as Trixie
- Cecil Paz as Girlie
- Arlene Tolibas as Princess
- Lui Manansala as Ms. Nolasco
- Dolly de Leon (credited as Dolly Gutierrez) as Paz
- Buddy Palad as Mang Tonying
- Boom Labrusca as Quintin

=== Guest cast ===
- Jairus Aquino as Bordy
- Simon Ibarra as Gardo
- Manuel Chua as Dante
- Mary Roldan as Mary
- EJ Jallorina as Ramon
- Beverly Salviejo as Minda
- Menggie Cobarrubias as Melancio
- Joseph Marco as Julian Sandejas
- Fredmoore delos Santos as Ben Policarpio

== Ratings ==
Precious Hearts Romances Presents: Pintada belongs to the top 5 most watched programs in the daytime and holds the number one place on its time slot against its rival from other networks, according to Kantar Media-TNS.

Last August 17, 2012, based on the official survey results released by Kantar Media-TNS, Pintada received a rating of 12.3%; 13.7% on August 20; and on August 21, it soared higher garnering a rating of 16.0%. On the following days, however, ratings got by Pintada were not consistent and ranged from 12 to 16%. Recently, Pintada recorded a rating of 16.4% on October 3, 2012, and 14.8% on October 4, 2012.

Pintada garnered positive reviews from critics and surveyed houseoholds.

== See also ==
- Precious Hearts Romances Presents
- List of ABS-CBN Studios original drama series
