= Paraiso (Philippine TV series) =

- Title card
- Also known as: Paradise
- Genre: Melodrama, Romance
- Created by: ABS-CBN Studios
- Based on: Isla Sanctuario by Dawn Igloria
- Developed by: ABS-CBN Studios
- Written by: Ruby Leah Castro; Jurey Mirafuentes; Michael Transfiguracion; Julius Benjamin Villanueva; Bianca Geli
- Directed by: Connie Macatuno; Nico Hernandez; Rechie del Carmen
- Creative director: Johnny Delos Santos
- Starring: Jessy Mendiola; Matteo Guidicelli; Jewel Mische; Matt Evans; Denise Laurel
- Opening theme: "Ikaw Lang at Ako" by Liezel Garcia
- Composer: Donna Cruz
- Country of origin: Philippines
- Original language: Filipino
- No. of episodes: 108

Production
- Executive producers: Carlo Katigbak; Cory Vidanes; Laurenti Dyogi
- Producer: Neal Felix del Rosario
- Running time: 30 minutes
- Production company: LMD Unit

Original release
- Network: ABS-CBN
- Release: November 5, 2012 – April 5, 2013

Related
- Precious Hearts Romances Presents: Pintada; Precious Hearts Romances Presents: Araw Gabi

Paraiso (lit. 'Paradise') is a Philippine television drama series broadcast by ABS-CBN. The series is based on the Filipino pocket book novel Isla Sanctuario created by Dawn Igloria, the series is eighteenth installment of Precious Hearts Romances Presents. Directed by Connie Macatuno, Nico Hernandez, and Rechie A. Del Carmen, it stars Jessy Mendiola, Matteo Guidicelli, Jewel Mische, Matt Evans, and Denise Laurel. It aired on the network's Kapamilya Gold line up and worldwide on TFC from November 5, 2012 to April 5, 2013, replacing Precious Hearts Romances Presents: Pintada and was replaced by Dugong Buhay.

== Production ==
The TV Series began production in April 2012, trailers were shown on July 1, 2012 on its ABS-CBN account of its second quarter of new TV Drama Programs. The TV Series was named Isla (Island), and on October 18, 2012 the title confirmed to a new name Paraiso (Paradise). The series marks the first team up of Matteo Guidicelli and Jessy Mendiola, it is also Jewel Mische's first teleserye lead role in ABS-CBN. Denise Laurel, who previously starred on its predecessor Pintada, also joined the cast in the middle of the series as the main antagonist.

== Plot ==
Paraiso tells the story of two strangers, Brennan and Yanie, who get stranded on an island after their ship gets wrecked. Romance blooms between them as they spend time alone on the island, but the two strangers are not without their respective baggage from the "real world". Brennan is married to his dedicated wife Megan, while Yanie's childhood best friend Justin has untold feelings for the young woman. The romance that grows between Yanie and Brennan will set off a series of twists and conflicts after the two gets back to their own lives in Manila.

== Cast and characters ==
=== Main cast ===
- Jessy Mendiola as Maryann "Yanie" Alipio-Galang
- Matteo Guidicelli as Brennan Galang
- Jewel Mische as Meagan Villareal-Gonzales
- Matt Evans as Justin Abar
- Denise Laurel as Cassandra Romano

=== Recurring cast ===
- Juan Rodrigo as Rodolfo Galang
- Evangeline Pascual as Edith Zarate
- Bodjie Pascua as Lito Alipio
- Angel Jacob as Emma Villareal
- Ina Feleo as Amanda Galang
- Arron Villaflor as Sonny Alipio
- Dionne Monsanto as Julianna Galang
- Guji Lorenzana as Eric Gonzales
- Pamu Pamorada as Myla Lumbao
- Justin Cuyugan as Steve Uy
- Alex Castro as Albert Ramirez
- Kathleen Hermosa as Beth
- Maliksi Morales as Jojo
- Idda Yaneza as Seling
- Hiyasmin Neri as Abby
- Gary Lim as Norman
- Shey Bustamante as Nicole
- Wendy Tabusalla as Alice
- Jessica Connelly as Josette
- Paco Evangelista as George
- Kazel Kinouchi as Rhoda
- Macky Billiones as Thirdy

=== Special participation ===
- Ces Quesada as Apolonia "Poleng" Alipio
- Marissa Sanchez as Cristina Cosme
- Manuel Chua as Gary Versoza
- Jason Abalos as Daniel (final episode)

== See also ==
- List of programs broadcast by ABS-CBN
- List of ABS-CBN Studios original drama series
- Villa Quintana
- Precious Hearts Romances Presents
