= Precious Hearts Romances Presents =

- Genre: Romance; Drama
- Created by: ABS-CBN Studios; Precious Pages Corporation
- Directed by: See Below
- Starring: See Below
- Opening theme: "Way Back into Love" by Sam Milby and Toni Gonzaga (May 4, 2009-May 14, 2010)
- Country of origin: Philippines
- Original language: Filipino
- No. of seasons: 4
- No. of episodes: 1,310 (list of episodes)

Production
- Executive producer: Laurenti Dyogi
- Running time: 30 minutes
- Production companies: Precious Hearts Romances; Star Creatives (Season 1-2); Dreamscape Entertainment (Season 2); LMD Unit (Season 3); RSB Unit (Season 4)

Original release
- Network: ABS-CBN
- Release: May 4, 2009 – September 27, 2019

Precious Hearts Romances Presents is a Philippine romantic drama television program broadcast on ABS-CBN starting in 2009. The program is based on adaptations of the bestselling Precious Hearts Romances series of paperback novels. Its first run was from May 4, 2009 to April 5, 2013, replacing Pieta and was replaced by Dugong Buhay. The series returned on its second run from April 30, 2018 to September 27, 2019, replacing Hanggang Saan and was replaced by Sandugo. The management decided to reboot the series after five years, which will be under the RSB Unit.

== Episodes ==
- List of Precious Hearts Romances Presents episodes

== See also ==
- List of programs broadcast by ABS-CBN
- List of ABS-CBN drama series
