= Maalaala Mo Kaya season 18 =

Maalaala Mo Kaya
- Season 18
- Starring: Charo Santos
- No. of episodes: 51

Release
- Original network: ABS-CBN
- Original release: August 1, 2009 – October 2, 2010

Season chronology
- ← Previous; Season 17 Next → Season 19

Maalaala Mo Kaya (transl. Would you remember?; abbreviated MMK), also known as Memories in English, is a Filipino television series, which was first aired on May 15, 1991. MMK is the longest-running drama anthology on Philippine television.

== Episodes ==
#	Episode title	Directed by	Written by	Original air date
1	"Pansit" "Noodles"	Nuel Naval	Ruel Montañez	August 1, 2009
A story of age, generations of servitude, and the extent of a daughter's love for her family. Mae Ann, a girl who was forced to stop schooling and had to work as a maid at a young age, while Bining, her mother who comes in conflict with her daughter after tragedy struck their family. Cast: Erich Gonzales, Ai-Ai de las Alas, Ronnie Lazaro, Kristel Fulgar, EJ Jallorina, Khaycee Aboloc, Jhoana Marie Tan, Aldred Gatchalian, Tanya Gomez, Risie Mayo, Amy Nobleza
2	"Cap"	Dado C. Lumibao	Mark Duane Angos	August 8, 2009
The episode is about the travails of Filipino war veterans in America and how they continue to fight for the country despite the distance from their homeland. Cast: Noel Trinidad, Nanding Josef, Prospero Luna, Joji Isla, Louella Albornoz, Lucita Soriano
3	"Apron"	John D. Lazatin	Shugo Praico	August 15, 2009
G. Toengi and Ryan Eigenmann as a migrant couple whose commitment to each other gets tested by the difficulties of living in a foreign land. Cast: G. Toengi, Ryan Eigenmann, Bettina Carlos, Mat Ranillo III, Gloria Diaz
4	"Letters"	John D. Lazatin	Joan Habana	August 22, 2009
A story of a woman struggling in her divorce and finding love again. Cast: Princess Punzalan, Michael de Mesa, Miguel Vera, Chad Peralta, Raymond Cabral
5	"Car"	Dado C. Lumibao	Arah Jell Badayos	August 29, 2009
A story of a friendship between a Filipino caregiver and a patient with Parkinson's disease. Two cultures united together by love and friendship. Cast: Gina Alajar, Lauren Young, Lynn Waters, Ilonah Jean, Rey Kilay
6	"Storybook"	Nuel C. Naval	Shugo Praico	September 5, 2009
Maja Salvador plays the role of Judy who has never had a boyfriend, but believes that her sense of humor and talent for acting should be enough to attract any guy. Trouble is most of her prospects eventually leave her for someone more pretty. Cast: Maja Salvador, Jason Abalos, Guji Lorenzana, Cris Villanueva, Ana Capri, Jessy Mendiola, Jose Sarasola, Allyson Luwalhati
7	"Bisikleta" "Bicycle"	Henry King Quitain	Joan Habana	September 19, 2009
Chen who has always been an avid fan of Philippine folklore because it was what her Lolo Uge instilled in her. But unlike other kids who eventually outgrow their fascination with mythical creatures such as dwarfs and fairies, Chen believes that they have the power to cure her mom's cancer. But when her mom suddenly dies, she begins to hate her grandfather for telling her the stories which she now sees as lies. Cast: Ronaldo Valdez, Mika dela Cruz, Dimples Romana, Yul Servo, Eva Darren, Justin Cuyugan, Xyriel Manabat
8	"Relo" "Watch"	Jeffrey R. Jeturian	Maribel Ilag	October 3, 2009
Rhia Mae, Leslie, Apple, Lorimel, and Cherry are about to discover the real meaning of friendship. Just like typical high school girls, they spend most of their time talking about either kikay stuff or cute boys in their class to the point that their parents become concerned about their dipping grades. Nothing can break them apart though since they have sworn to be the "best simple buddies forever" or BSBF. To prevent any conflict, their number one rule is that they won't keep any secret from each other. But then the barkada's common crush becomes attracted to Rhiamae who begins to meet him without telling her friends. Cast: Miles Ocampo, Jane Oineza, Kiray Celis, Eliza Pineda, Angeli Gonzales, John Manalo, Mickey Ferriols
9	"Musiko" "Music"	Nuel C. Naval	Ruel Montañez	October 10, 2009
Santa, a woman who stands to lose everything she values in life. First, she is forced to give up her dream of being a singer when she marries her boyfriend Pete. Raising a family turns out to be a full-time job in itself, but singing remains her first love. When an opportunity for her to sing at funerals comes her way, Santa discovers that she can still use her talent to bring honor to the dead. Unfortunately, her family has never understood her passion for music and is uncomfortable with the fact she earns money as a wake singer. By the time she realizes how much her husband and her children detest her for being constantly away, her marriage is already on the rocks and her eldest son is addicted to drugs. Cast: Zsa Zsa Padilla, Raymond Lauchengco, Martin del Rosario, Nikki Bacolod, Beverly Salviejo
10	"Salamin" "Glasses"	Nick Olanka	Rose Colindres	October 17, 2009
Bebing, a hunchback who has given up all hope of having a normal life. Though she is not totally embittered by her disability, she believes that no man would ever get attracted to her because of it. But then she meets Tonio who later falls in love with her. At first she denies that there's a mutual attraction between them, but she eventually gives in to her strong feelings for him. Unfortunately, the man's mother disapproves of his relationship with a hunchback like her. Cast: Maricar Reyes, Carlo Aquino, Wendy Valdez, Neil Ryan Sese, Celine Lim, Manuel Chua, Justin Gonzales, Lyka Ugarte, Leandro Baldemor, Daria Ramirez
11	"Sulô" "Torch"	Nuel C. Naval	Shugo Praico	October 24, 2009
Chato, a teacher who has never thought of leaving her pupils despite the lack of facilities and supplies in their school. Located in a distant and poverty-stricken barrio, she is the only one left to make sure that the children there would get a good education. A twist of fate brings the young and well-off Jean to the barrio and Chato does not take to the idea of having to work with someone like her. They eventually set their differences aside though when they decided to help the pupils improve their performance so they could pass the annual national achievement test. It is definitely a huge challenge on their part because most of the children have difficulty attending classes since they come from low-income families and the fact that the school is situated in a remote area. Cast: Cristine Reyes, Irma Adlawan, Sharlene San Pedro, Edgar Allan Guzman, Nikki Bagaporo, Julio Diaz, Mica Torre, Kyle Balili
12	"Lubid" "Rope"	Ruel S. Bayani	Maribel Ilag	November 7, 2009
This episode mainly focuses on the life story of Jerome Concepcion, a man suffering from Tourette's syndrome, a mental disorder that is caused by involuntary tics. Jerome Concepcion who was diagnosed with Tourette Syndrome when he was already in his early 20s. Jerome bears a lot of emotional scars because he grew up being severely disciplined by his mom Criselda who never understood his odd mannerisms and mood swings due to his illness. After his father passes away soon after being diagnosed with lung cancer, Jerome is left with no choice but to help his mom take care of his siblings. Cast: Gerald Anderson, Rio Locsin, Nonie Buencamino, Robi Domingo, Julia Montes, John Manalo, Dino Imperial, Julio Pisk, Fred Payawan
13	"Bangka" "Boat"	Nuel Naval	Benjamin Benson Logronio	November 21, 2009
Curing, a young girl who can't fulfill her dream of becoming a teacher during World War II. Curing is crushed when her parents ask her to stop schooling three months before her graduation because they have no money. Hoping for a better life, she decides to go to Manila with some of her townsfolk to search for opportunities for a better life. Cast: Empress Schuck, Matt Evans
14	"Isdâ" "Fish"	Nuel Naval	Benjamin Benson Logronio	November 28, 2009
Cast: Gina Pareño, Chin Chin Gutierrez, Helga Krapf
15	"Tsinelas" "Slippers"	Lino S. Cayetano	Gina Marissa Tagasa	December 5, 2009
Lina, who runs away from home, thinking that she will be better off on her own. By the time she realizes her mistake, she could no longer find a way to keep in touch with her parents again. Left without a choice, she moves on with her life and starts to raise a family of her own. But as soon as her son Reyniel is old enough to understand what she went through in the past, he begins to search for Lina's long-lost parents through the internet. Cast: Dawn Zulueta, Carl John Barrameda, Lauren Young, Ketchup Eusebio, Cris Villanueva, Gilleth Sandico, Efren Reyes Jr., Basty Alcances, Khaycee Aboloc, Eva Darren
16	"Videoke"	Henry King Quitain	Henry King Quitain	December 12, 2009
Maria, an immigrant who leaves her homeland for a fresh start in Manila. The fulfillment that she gets from being a nurse would have been enough, but then her life takes a whole new meaning when she meets Rey in a party. They soon find themselves deeply in love with each other to the point that Maria couldn't envision a life with Rey. Cast: Carmen Soo, Luis Manzano, Gladys Reyes, Lui Villaruz, Arlene Muhlach, JM Lagumbay, Mike Lloren, Princess Manzon Ricardo Cepeda, Maria Isabel Lopez
17	"Gitara" "Guitar"	Dado C. Lumibao	Maribel Ilag	December 19, 2009
Tara Santelices, a Political Science graduate of Ateneo de Manila University who got shot in the head during a holdup on the eve of her birthday last August 6, 2008. Though she was comatose for almost a year, her dad refused to take her off life support while her mom wanted her suffering to end. The Santelices family had a hard time accepting Tara's fate since not only was she a good daughter but she had touched a lot of people's lives with her advocacy. Proof of how well loved Tara was the long line of visitors during her confinement in the hospital and her friends and acquaintances mounted various fund raising activities for her expensive hospital bills. Cast: Karylle, Cherry Pie Picache, Albert Martinez, Megan Young
18	"Ketchup"	Veronica Velasco	Rose Colindres	January 2, 2010
When Rox meets Nathan, she doesn't expect to find an instant connection between them. But since she knows how much Ara really loves him, Rox tries to suppress her growing feelings for him. But then Nathan eventually confesses his love for Rox so they decide to keep their relationship secret. Cast: Shaina Magdayao, Jason Abalos, Niña Jose, Allyson Luwalhati, Melissa Mendez
19	"Bag"	Ruel S. Bayani	Shugo Praico	January 9, 2010
Eric, a sincere and kind-hearted man who falls in love with a janitress named Aira. Just like any other persistent suitor, Eric is willing to do whatever it takes just to win his ladylove's heart. His efforts soon pay off and he and Aira get married. But then Aira gets romantically involved with a co-worker. Cast: Zanjoe Marudo, Valerie Concepcion, Rafael Rosell, Tess Antonio, Cheska Billiones
20	"Kalapati" "Dove"	Jeffrey Jeturian	Joan Habana	January 23, 2010
The first part of the Cory Aquino and Ninoy Aquino love story. Cast: Piolo Pascual, Bea Alonzo, Liezel Martinez, Yayo Aguila, Jodi Sta. Maria, Jim Paredes, Gloria Diaz. Ryan Ramos, Carla Humphries, Joyce So, Madeleine Nicholas, Angeli Gonzales, Mikylla Ramirez, Mika dela Cruz, Nash Aguas, Kristel Moreno, Krista Valle, Sam Concepcion, Hiyasmin Neri, Kris Aquino
21	"Makinilya" "Typewriter"	Jeffrey Jeturian	Joan Habana	January 30, 2010
The second part of the Cory Aquino and Ninoy Aquino love story. Cast: Piolo Pascual, Bea Alonzo, Liezel Martinez, Yayo Aguila, Jodi Sta. Maria, Jim Paredes, Gloria Diaz, Ryan Ramos, Carla Humphries, Joyce So, Madeleine Nicholas, Angeli Gonzales, Mikylla Ramirez, Mika dela Cruz, Nash Aguas, Kristel Moreno, Krista Valle, Sam Concepcion, Hiyasmin Neri, Kris Aquino
22	"Basura" "Garbage"	Nick Olanka	Ricardo Fernando III	February 6, 2010
Bibot, a typical bad boy who earns money from scavenging in the mountain of garbage in Payatas. With his notorious reputation, it's understandable why a decent girl like Len wouldn't give him the time of day. But when she sees how sincere and determined Bibot is to win her heart, she inevitably develops feelings for him. A happily-ever-after seems to be impossible, however, since Bibot still has to prove himself to Len's family. Cast: Melissa Ricks, Matt Evans, Lotlot De Leon, Rey PJ Abellana, Snooky Serna, Perla Bautista, Kitkat, Carlo Lacana
23	"Litrato" "Photograph"	Dado C. Lumibao	Joan Habana	February 13, 2010 (re-aired on September 3, 2022)
Fidel, a charming guy is determined to win the heart of his co-worker named Jenna. It was only when they became a couple did he tell her that he already has a wife and a kid. Dreaming for her ideal man, Jenna finds herself as an accidental mistress. Cast: Jake Cuenca, Angel Locsin, Desiree del Valle, Zeppi Borromeo, Izzy Canillo, Gem Ramos, Mara Lopez, Tom Rodriguez
24	"Kariton" "Pushcart"	Jerry Lopez-Sineneng	Rose Colindres	February 20, 2010
For someone who grew up in the urban slums of Cavite, Efren Peñaflorida rose above poverty to make something of himself. He acquired scholarship grants and financial assistance from several non-profit organizations because of his academic accomplishments. At the age of 16, he was able to establish the Dynamic Teen Company which provides alternative education by recreating school settings in unconventional locations such as cemeteries and dump sites. Cast: Enchong Dee, Gina Alajar, Dominic Ochoa, John Manalo, Dick Israel, Daria Ramirez, Janus Del Prado, Bryan Homecillo, Kristel Fulgar, Jairus Aquino
25	"Camera"	Jerry Lopez-Sineneng	Dado C. Lumibao	March 13, 2010
Being gang-raped is probably the worst thing a woman could ever experience in a lifetime. But for Katrina who went through such a traumatic ordeal several times, she didn't let it stop her from moving on with her life and raising the children whose fathers she hates so much. She even worked hard to be a professional talent in show business just to provide a good home for them and yet she doesn't understand why her four sons couldn't appreciate any of her efforts. Not only do they disrespect her but they are also ashamed of her profession as a TV extra. Until such time that Katrina got fed up with all their complaints and disobedience to the point that she burst out her darkest secret just to knock some sense into them. Cast: Janice de Belen, William Martinez, Makisig Morales, Paul Salas, Aaron Junatas, Alfred Labatos, Rubi Rubi, Mon Confiado, Eda Nolan, Celine Lim
26	"Piano"	Dado C. Lumibao	Joan Habana	March 20, 2010
Christine, a typical high school girl who practically has the world at her feet. Christine is not just a pretty face but a consistent honor student as well as an active choir member/guitarist. But a twist of fate puts her faith to the test as she gradually loses her sense of hearing. The fact that she's a promising musician only makes it harder for her to accept such a disability. Cast: Andi Eigenmann, Raymond Lauchengco, Matteo Guidicelli, Yayo Aguila, Mark Joshua Sayarot, Thara Jordana and Kaye Miranda
27	"Dancing Shoes"	Nuel C. Naval	Joan Habana	March 27, 2010
Brought together by their passion for dancing, Herbert and Elena have been close friends since high school up to their college days. Elena has always been captivated by Herbert's talent and patience in helping others appreciate the art of dancing; while the latter simply enjoys having a beautiful and attentive pupil with whom he can practice his skills as an aspiring choreographer. Being around each other almost every day finally opens their eyes to the possibility of romance. Cast: Maja Salvador, John Prats, Rita Avila, Arron Villaflor, Princess Ryan, Lou Veloso, and Japoy Lizardo
28	"Larawan" "Picture"	Jerry Lopez-Sineneng	Ruel Montañez	April 10, 2010 (re-aired on November 5, 2022)
Maria is a widow who falls in love with a newly transferred parochial priest. Their peculiar relationship ends in marriage. Against all odds, she fights for her love and her children. She thought that a perfect life awaits them after moving to a new place but circumstances lead her to suffer the life of a pariah, under the intense scrutiny of her community. Cast: Gretchen Barretto, Jomari Yllana, Mika dela Cruz, Tyron Perez, Julio Pisk, Kier Legaspi, Dexter Doria, Pen Medina
29	"Shell"	Dado C. Lumibao	Benjamin Benson Logronio	April 17, 2010
Flor, a landlady who falls in love with his boarder named Bong. Her daughter, Joy, does not accept that fact because she wants her mother and her godfather to be together. Cast: Zsa Zsa Padilla, Tonton Gutierrez, Miles Ocampo, Manuel Chua, Tanya Gomez
30	"Saranggola" "Kite"	Dado C. Lumibao	Maan Dimaculangan	April 24, 2010
Dolly, a battered wife to a ruthless man Raul. At first, she has no choice but to accept her fate for the sake of their four kids. But when her life is put at stake, she ends up running away from home, leaving her children at the mercy of her cruel husband. Determined to rescue her kids, Dolly assumes a new identity so she can take them out her husband's cruel hands. Cast: Jodi Sta. Maria, Baron Geisler, Mark Gil, Sylvia Sanchez, Smokey Manaloto, Arlene Muhlach, Wendy Valdez, Ma. Isabel Lopez, Soliman Cruz, Charles Christianson, Ronalisa Cheng, Marco Morales, Maliksi Morales, and Jerome Ventinilla
31	"Headband"	Nick Olanka	Arah Jell Badayos	May 1, 2010
Nicole, Samantha, and Jamaica, three transvestite gays, who became sampaguita vendors after their respective families disowned them for their sexual preferences. Despite their occasional misunderstandings, all three remain close friends and even make a pact to protect each other from the dangers of living in the streets. But when they get caught up in gangs for security, sex trafficking for survival, and drugs to escape reality, it seems that there's no going back to the simple but happy life that they used to have. Cast: Alwyn Uytingco, Martin del Rosario, Justin Gonzales, IC Mendoza, William Lorenzo, Lovely Rivero, Justin Gonzales, Basty Alcances, Quintin Alianza
32	"Xylophone"	Jerry Lopez-Sineneng	Joan Habana	May 8, 2010
Alice, the kind-hearted aunt of Eleng who entrusts her son Charles to her care. Alice is forced to raise the boy while Eleng earns a living abroad. The conflict begins when Eleng returns five years later and Charles doesn't recognize her. Cast: Ai-Ai de las Alas, Zaijan Jaranilla, Karla Estrada, Lauren Young
33	"Kwintas" "Necklace"	Jerry Lopez-Sineneng	Mark Duane Angos	May 22, 2010
Myla is being mistreated in her family just because she's a lesbian. It's like as if she has acquired a contagious disease with the way her mother avoids her ever since they've had a huge fight because of what she has become. Their ever-increasing gap finally takes a toll on Myla as she turns to her friends who taught her how to use drugs instead of bringing her much-needed comfort. Her older brother eventually learns about her vices and asks her to leave their home. Cast: Aiza Seguerra, Dominic Ochoa, Gina Alajar, Helga Krapf, Cherry Lou, Sharlene San Pedro, Cathy Remperas, Auriette Divina
34	"Diploma"	Rechie A. Del Carmen	Ricardo Fernando III	May 29, 2010
Nana Rosa is a 60-year-old mom who made a lot of sacrifices just so she can send her children to school. By the time they've all graduated from college, Nana Rosa decides to go back to school so she can have a sense of fulfillment as well. But she soon realizes that it's going to be a tough journey since she's far behind in their class. Cast: Helen Gamboa, Robert Arevalo, Marc Abaya, Kristel Moreno, Barbie Sabino, Lara Quigaman, Nanding Josef, Hiyasmin Neri, Aldred Gatchalian, Kenjie Garcia, Regine Angeles, Nash Aguas, Eda Nolan
35	"Gitara" "Guitar"	Mae Cruz	Arah Jell Badayos	June 5, 2010
Vangie is a beautiful barrio lass who crosses paths with Pilo one week before his wedding day with a childhood sweetheart Dolores. By the time she learns that he's committed to someone else, Vangie has already fallen head over heels in love with him. Nevertheless, she surrenders to a seven-day-romance with him. Cast: Erich Gonzales, Jolo Revilla, Beatriz Saw, Neil Sese, Irma Adlawan, Efren Reyes, Jr., LJ Moreno, Erika Padilla, Kristel Moreno, Yda Yaneza, Mike Lloren
36	"Bimpo" "Sweat towel"	Nick Olanka	Maan Dimaculangan	June 12, 2010
Joy, a 17-year-old who gets pregnant after having an intimate relationship with her boyfriend, Nitoy. While they are admittedly not ready for the responsibilities that come with marriage, the two are forced to do so for the sake of their baby. Joy and Nitoy try their best to make it work, but their angst over their broken dreams slowly tears them apart. Cast: Kim Chiu, Carlo Aquino, Lotlot De Leon, Izzy Canillo, Josef Elizalde, Daphne Cortez, Zaira Dela Peña, Isay Alvarez, Richard Quan, Glenda Garcia, Rey PJ Abellana, JM Lagumbay
37	"Bahay" "House"	Jerry Lopez-Sineneng	Dado C. Lumibao	June 19, 2010
In a time where the roles of family members are constantly changing, Daniel, a househusband whose wife Rosario works in Italy in order to provide the needs of their three children. Given their situation, Daniel is the one in charge of taking care of household chores, bringing the kids to school, and the like. It's not an easy job especially because he's aware of how the society looks down on guys like him. Unfortunately, even his kids begin to criticize him for not being the provider in their family. Cast: Cogie Domingo, Bettina Carlos, Eliza Pineda, Andrei Garcia, Angelo Garcia, Christopher Roxas, Lui Villaruz, Jane Oineza, Angela Urquico
38	"Gitara" "Guitar"	Rechie A. Del Carmen	Joan Habana	June 26, 2010
Buloy, a barangay official whose wife Janina and daughter Mabel (Bangs Garcia) desert him. In his loneliness and yearning for a family, he spearheads a children's choir in their town and spends the majority of his time training them to sing like pros. He even brings them to a nearby beach where they perform vocalization exercises. But behind his usual demeanor is a dying man who desperately wants to make a difference to fill the emptiness in his heart. Cast: Christopher de Leon, Mica Torre, Kyle Balili, Aubrey Caraan, Amy Nobleza, Shane Hermogenes, Kiray Celis, Makisig Morales
39	"Pera" "Money"	Dondon S. Santos	Benjamin Benson Logronio	July 3, 2010
The story of Nene, a girl who has worked as a police informant ever since she was 16 years old. When she gets married at the age of 17, Nene tries to concentrate on raising a family, but she later goes back to her dangerous job when she catches her husband cheating on her. While she's a very competent police asset, taking care of her son often gets in the way. Her dangerous work eventually causes the two of them to grow apart. Cast: Alessandra De Rossi, Bobby Andrews, John Manalo, Julio Diaz, Perla Bautista, Ana Capri, Raquel Montessa and Menggie Cobbarubias
40	"Pinwheel"	Dado C. Lumibao	Benjamin Benson Logronio	July 17, 2010
Antonio is forced to offer "extra service" to his clients in order to earn more money for the sake of his daughter April who is diagnosed with a serious illness. Homophobic as he is, he is left with little choice on how to make sure his daughter gets what she needs. Cast: Sid Lucero, Francine Prieto, Phoebe Kay Arbotante, Jommy Teotico, DM Sevilla, William Lorenzo, Eva Darren
41	"Bus"	Mae Czarina Cruz	Benjamin Benson Logronio	July 24, 2010
Clifford is an OFW who applied as a singer but became a housekeeper at the Venetian Hotel in Macau. Cast: Erik Santos, Kristel Moreno, Paw Diaz, Jojit Lorenzo
42	"School Building"	Dado C. Lumibao	Maan Dimaculangan	July 31, 2010
Belinda, is a school proprietress who becomes a victim of unwanted sexual advances from a high-ranking official in an agency where she is trying to secure a school permit. Some of her acquaintances discourage her from pressing charges, saying that it was just a kiss. But for someone who has always been in pursuit of truth and justice, Belinda insists that the whole incident is something worth fighting for. However, she stands to lose not only her newly built school, but even her marriage because of the scandal following her long and heartbreaking legal battle. Cast: Rio Locsin, Ricky Davao, Dante Rivero, Bernadette Allyson, CJ Ramos, Serena Dalrymple, Timothy Chan, Celine Lim, Tanya Gomez, Ron Morales, Gee-ann Abrahan, Fretzie Bercede, Patrick Sugui
43	"Toy Car"	Nick Olanka	Maan Dimaculangan	August 7, 2010
Pangga, is an ambitious and rebellious maid who falls in love with two guys at the same time. Pangga meets Jover first, the family driver of the same household where she works. He proves to be a persistent suitor despite Pangga's constant declarations that she only goes for handsome men. Her troubles begin as she crosses paths with a village security guard named Dante and is instantly captivated by his good looks. Cast: Melai Cantiveros, Ketchup Eusebio, Ryan Eigenmann, Candy Pangilinan, Ces Aldaba, Jaja Gonzales, Tess Antonio, Debralis Velasote, Susan Africa
44	"Kuliglig" "Insect"	Dado C. Lumibao	Mark Duane Argos	August 14, 2010
Manny whose original calling was to become a man of the cloth. But his life takes a different course when his parents are murdered when he was just a child. He vows to hunt down the rebels who were responsible for their deaths. He's so determined to take justice in his own hands to the point that he alienates himself from his siblings who are against his plans. Cast: Zanjoe Marudo, Nash Aguas, Matet de Leon, Wowie De Guzman, Leo Rialp, Lester Llansang, Hiyasmin Neri, Jay-R Siaboc, Marion Dela Cruz, Mymy Davao, Jong Cuenco, Zeppi Borromeo, Gigi Locsin, Mike Lloren, Maritess Joaquin
45	"Cross-stitch"	Jeffrey R. Jeturian	Joan Habana	August 21, 2010
Cast: Coney Reyes, Rayver Cruz, Bianca Manalo, Charee Pineda, Jose Sarasola, Cai Cortez, Justin Gonzales, Thara Jordana
46	"Wedding Ring"	Ruel S. Bayani	Arlene Tamayo	August 28, 2010
Cast: Jay Manalo, Pops Fernandez, Chinchin Gutierrez, Justin Cuyugan, Nikki Bacolod, Biboy Ramirez, Rico Barrera, Khaycee Aboloc
47	"Funeral Parlor"	Jeffrey R. Jeturian	Benjamin Benson Logronio	September 4, 2010
A story of two families who clashed because of a funeral parlor. Mabel and her Uncle Delfin established a funeral parlor in their barangay. With their combined expertise, their funeral business boomed until Delfin's sister Magdalena came into the picture. Magdalena wanted to have a part on their business but Mabel would not hear it. Magdalena menaced their business and started a competition when she established her own funeral parlor. Mabel's funeral parlor went out of business. But everything ended well when Mabel was able to save Magdalena from certain death. They learned to forgive each other and they realized that their relationship is far more important than their business. Cast: Assunta De Rossi, Gloria Diaz, William Martinez, Allen Dizon, Johan Santos, Cheska Billiones, Aubrey Caraan, Bodjie Pascua, Racquel Villavicencio
48	"Videoke"	Jeffrey R. Jeturian	Joan Habana	September 11, 2010
Cast: Ella Cruz, Emilio Garcia, Lotlot De Leon, Malou Crisologo, Basty Alcances, Izzy Canillo, Amy Nobleza
49	"Manika" "Doll"	Dado C. Lumibao	Honey Hidalgo	September 18, 2010
Cast: Gina Pareño, Miles Ocampo, Spanky Manikan, Snooky Serna, Matthew Mendoza, Jane Oineza, Eda Nolan, Gemmae Custodio, Leandro Baldemor, RJ Calipus, Elmer Felix, Cherry Lou
50	"Titulo" "Title"	Don M. Cuaresma	Arlene Tamayo	September 25, 2010
Cast: Matt Evans, Precious Lara Quigaman, Paolo Serrano, Irma Adlawan, Tommy Abuel, Daisy Reyes, Alchris Galura, Mhyco Aquino, Carlo Lacana
51	"T-shirt"	Lino S. Cayetano	Benjamin Benson Logronio	October 2, 2010
The only thing Mojacko knew about himself was his name, but that too did not belonged to him. He was called Mojacko because his deaf and mute mother couldn’t tell what his birth name was. But Mojacko did not care, as long as he was with his mother, he was happy. However, to survive, Mojacko's mother worked as a dancer, having relationships with different men, making Mojacko feel unloved. Their lives started to change when Mojacko met Emily, a social worker, who invited him to stay in a shelter providing for his needs and processed the necessary papers for Mojacko and his mother to have the names—John and Malou Garcia. But more than having a name, Mojacko realized how much his mother love him and that the reason she worked in a club was to give him a better life. Cast: Aaron Junatas, Ana Capri, Smokey Manaloto, Nikki Valdez, Maliksi Morales, Manuel Chua
