= Hiyasmin Neri =

Filipino actress

- Born: Hiyasmin Manguray Neri; July 17, 1988 (age 37); Quezon City, Metro Manila, Philippines
- Occupations: Actress; host; musician
- Years active: 2007–2021
- Agent: Star Magic (2008–2017)
- Spouse: Patt Soyao (m. 2019)
- Children: 2

Hiyasmin Manguray Neri-Soyao (born July 17, 1988) is a former Filipino actress, host and musician.

== Career ==
Neri was introduced via Star Magic batch 15. Her first regular TV appearance was in ABS-CBN's The Wedding, where she played a pregnant teenager and cousin to Anne Curtis's character Candice. Before signing up with Star Magic, Neri appeared in the indie films Xenoa and UPCAT.

In 2010, Hiyasmin was also part in a comedy educational sitcom, K-High, exclusively aired on Knowledge Channel. This was Hiyasmin's 1st educational show with a bonus sitcom.

In 2013, Neri started appearing as one of the presenters of O Shopping, a Home TV Shopping program by ACJ, a joint venture between ABS-CBN Corporation and CJ Korea.

=== The Pin-Ups ===
When The Pin-up Girls broke up in 2013, Neri was approached by the band's founder Mondo C. Castro to join The Pin-Ups. Neri sang and played the guitars for the short-lived indie band.

== Personal life ==
Neri holds a Bachelor of Science in Clothing Technology degree from the University of the Philippines and completed her Masters in Business Administration at Ateneo Graduate School of Business. Neri married businessman Patt Soyao on May 25, 2019. Together, they have two children: a daughter named Heather Kaia (b. 2022) and a son named Hans Patrick (b. 2024).

== Filmography ==
=== Television ===
Year	Title	Role	Notes	Source
2008	Maalaala Mo Kaya	Neneng	Episode: "Notebook"	
2009	The Wedding	Sophia		
2009	Maalaala Mo Kaya	Michelle	Episode: "Tattoo"	
2010	Maalaala Mo Kaya	Viel	Episode: "Kalapati"	
2010	Maalaala Mo Kaya	Viel	Episode: "Makinilya"	
2010	Kung Tayo'y Magkakalayo	Brittany		
2010	Midnight DJ	Maureen	Episode: "Lihim ng Tukador"	
2010	Maalaala Mo Kaya	Cecile	Episode: "Diploma"	
2010	Maalaala Mo Kaya	Mercy	Episode: "Kuliglig"	
2010	Maalaala Mo Kaya		Episode: "Passbook"	
2010	Your Song Presents: Andi	Abbie	Episode: "Opposites Attract"	
2010	Imortal	Taong Lobo		
2010	K-High	Aya		
2011	Maalaala Mo Kaya	Pilita	Episode: "TV"	
2011	Maalaala Mo Kaya	Christine Mata	Episode: "Tap Dancing Shoes"	
2011	Nasaan Ka, Elisa?	Romina		
2011	Your Song Presents: Kim	Jackie	Episode: "Awit Kay Inay"	
2011	Guns and Roses	Kitchie		
2012	Mundo Man ay Magunaw	Diana		
2012	Oka2kat	Young Aming	Guest, 1 episode	
2012	Angelito: Batang Ama	Martina		
2012	Maalaala Mo Kaya		Episode: "Journal"	
2012	Maalaala Mo Kaya	Ella	Episode: "Bahay"	
2013	Huwag Ka Lang Mawawala	Young Maria		
2013	Precious Hearts Romances Presents: Paraiso	Abby		
2013	Maria Mercedes	Jane		
2013–2020	O Shopping	Herself/host		
2014	Pure Love	Felicity		
2015	Bridges of Love	Priscilla Angeles		
2016	Maalaala Mo Kaya	Lyda	Episode: "Family Pictures"	
2017	Pusong Ligaw	Andrea	Extended Cast	

=== Film ===
Year	Title	Role	Notes	Source
2007	Xenoa	Jane		
2008	UPCAT	Jane	Credited as "Yas Neri".	
2010	Sa 'yo Lamang			
2011	Bulong			
2011	Rakenrol	Jane		
2014	Ligaw	Mary-Ann		
2015	The Love Affair	Gelai		
