= Makinilya =

- Maalaala Mo Kaya episode
- Episode no.: Season 18; Episode 21
- Directed by: Jeffrey Jeturian
- Written by: Joan Habana
- Original air date: January 30, 2010

Guest appearances
- Piolo Pascual as Benigno "Ninoy" Aquino Jr.; Bea Alonzo as Corazon "Cory" Aquino; Jim Paredes as José "Don Pepe" Cojuangco; Gloria Diaz as Demetria "Metring" Cojuangco; Jodi Sta. Maria as Kristina Bernadette "Kris" Aquino; Celine Lim as pre-teen Kris; Fatty Mendoza as young Kris; Liezl Martinez as Maria Elena "Ballsy" Aquino; Kristel Moreno as young adult Ballsy; Yayo Aguila as Aurora Corazon "Pinky" Aquino; Krista Valle as young adult Pinky; Dimples Romana as Imelda Marcos; Sam Concepcion as Benigno Simeon "Noynoy" Aquino III; Madeleine Nicolas as Donya Aurora Aquino; Gerard Pizzaras as Maximo Soliven; Simon Ibarra as Ramon Mitra Jr.; Neil Sese as Francisco "Soc" Rodrigo

Episode chronology
← Previous "Kalapati"	Next → "Basura"

"Makinilya" (lit. 'Typewriter') is the 21st episode of the 18th season of the Filipino drama anthology series Maalaala Mo Kaya (MMK), and is the second of two parts of "The Ninoy & Cory Aquino Story". Written by Joan Habana and directed by Jeffrey Jeturian, it first aired on ABS-CBN in the Philippines on January 30, 2010. To execute the project, ABS-CBN teamed with Swatch and collaborated with Jaime Zobel de Ayala and the Ninoy & Cory Aquino Foundation.

== Plot ==
Philippine President Ferdinand Marcos declares martial law in September 1972, and Senator Ninoy Aquino is immediately arrested. For the next seven years, Ninoy's wife Cory has to raise their five children solely by herself while also being the source of inspiration and strength for Ninoy as they endure his imprisonment. Upon the resumption of an unjust military trial in 1975 to reinvestigate his case, Ninoy attempts a 40-day hunger strike in protest, though he is eventually persuaded by Cory against doing it any further. Despite receiving a guilty verdict from the trial and being sentenced to death, Ninoy suffers a heart attack in early 1980 and is permitted by the Marcos regime to acquire medical treatment in the United States, with the Aquino family joining him.

After living peacefully in exile for three years in Boston, Ninoy decides to return to the Philippines in August 1983 despite his family's opposition, as he wished to continue pursuing freedom for the Philippines. Upon landing at Manila International Airport on August 21, 1983, Ninoy is assassinated by an unknown gunman, devastating Cory and the children. Ninoy's death was mourned by millions of Filipinos, and would prove to be a catalyst for the 1986 People Power Revolution that deposes of President Marcos and installs Cory as the country's new leader.

== Production ==
On December 10, 2009, Piolo Pascual confirmed during a press conference for his album Decades that he has been cast to play Benigno Aquino Jr. for Maalaala Mo Kaya; he had been the preferred choice of the Aquinos' daughters to play their father. Pascual also revealed that shooting would begin a week later. On January 7, 2010, Bea Alonzo was confirmed to have been cast as Corazon Aquino, though she had yet to discuss with the Aquino family regarding the project.

== Reception ==
On the Saturday it aired, "Makinilya" received a rating of 31.1% according to TNS.
