= Maalaala Mo Kaya season 19 =

Maalaala Mo Kaya
- Season 19
- Starring: Charo Santos
- No. of episodes: 23

Release
- Original network: ABS-CBN
- Original release: October 9, 2010 – September 24, 2011

Season chronology
- ← Previous; Season 18 Next → Season 20

Maalaala Mo Kaya (transl. Would you remember?; abbreviated MMK), also known as Memories in English, is a Filipino television series, which was first aired on May 15, 1991. MMK is the longest-running drama anthology on Philippine television.

== Episodes ==
#	Episode title	Directed by	Written by	Original air date
1	"Marriage Contract"	Jeffrey Jeturian	Maan Dimaculangan	October 9, 2010
Ana, a social climber from the province, and Mark, a good-looking but emotionally weak guy, met on a ship to a city one April Fool's Day. It turned out they were heading to the same agency to work as a secretary and a sailor, respectively, which paved way for their budding romance. Their dilemma begins when their common friends played with a blank marriage contract, wrote their names on it and put them on a journey of pretensions, heartaches, courtship and the realization of an authentic marriage contract. Cast: Jessy Mendiola, Xian Lim, Allyson Lualhati
2	"Medal for Valor"	Christopher De Leon	Dado C. Lumibao	October 16, 2010
Lolong (who'll later be known as Medal of Valor awardee Lt. Romualdo Rubi) who has chosen a career in the military despite his mother's and wife's protests. He will learn the hard way that such a path will cause him so much trouble and heartache. Cast: Jhong Hilario, Sandy Andolong, Bembong Roco, Jodi Sta. Maria, Carl John Barrameda, Martin del Rosario, Ketchup Eusebio, Gerard Pizzaras, Eliza Pineda, Gabriel de Leon
3	"Seaweeds"	Dado Lumibao	Joan Habana	October 23, 2010
Zoraida had relationships with men of different races, by whom she bore six children: Rodel, a Filipino; Alexis, an African-American; Charm, a white American; and Hilda, Honeylet and Hero who are all Filipinos. She experiences a lot of difficulty because of her children's racial differences. Cast: Cherry Pie Picache, Lauren Young, Allan Paule, Dexter Doria, Neil Ryan Sese, Kristel Fulgar, Mika Dela Cruz, Arron Villaflor, Andre Garcia, Gem Ramos
4	"Rosas" "Roses"	Dado C. Lumibao	Janice Cortez	October 30, 2010
A Halloween special. Bing, a young widow whose husband Arnel returns to haunt her in her dreams. Apparently, they have vowed to love each other for eternity that not even death could separate them. When Bing meets Dindo, he convinces her to move on with her life. Cast: Maja Salvador, Felix Roco. Ejay Falcon, Gardo Versoza, Helga Krapf, Celine Lim, Mark Sayarot
5	"Silbato" "Whistle"	Dado C. Lumibao	Honey Hidalgo and Dado Lumibao	November 6, 2010
A star witness with a mental disability. Jerome, a man with a mental disability who aspires to be a policeman in Maalaala Mo Kaya. Blessed with a happy disposition and a determination to live a normal life, Jerome lands a job as an errand boy at a local police station. Many on the staff admire his enthusiasm and the fact that he gets the job done. Things seem to be going well for him until he falls in love with Amy who can’t reciprocate his feelings. Worse, he accidentally becomes a witness in a crime that's bound to destroy everything he has hoped for. Cast: Coco Martin, Desiree Del Valle, Rio Locsin, Richard Quan, Melissa Mendez, Bing Davao, Atoy Co
6	"Passbook"	Rechie del Carmen	Joan Habana	November 13, 2010
Cast: Albert Martinez, Roxanne Guinoo, Malou de Guzman, William Lorenzo, Nikki Bacolod, Martin del Rosario, Angeli Gonzales
7	"Mangga" "Mango"	Veronica Velasco	Mark Duane Angos	November 27, 2010
Three women deal with family tragedy after the MV Leonida II disaster. Marie who's constantly competing with her sisters Julie and Ivy for their parents’ attention. Their rift reaches the point where they are practically strangers to each other. Unfortunately, it will take their parents and younger brother's tragic accident to bring them back together again. A true to life story about how these three women will struggle through the pain that the 2006 MV Leonida II tragedy (a ferry boat which capsized due to overloading in Surigao city) has brought in their lives and how they will rise above it in the end. Cast: Niña Jose, Emmanuelle Vera, Moreen Guese, Arlene Muhlach, William Martinez
8	"Bracelet"	Nuel Naval	Joan Habana	December 4, 2010
Carla Francisco (16) is a loving daughter of Allan and Norma Francisco. Norma Francisco who's recently widowed but struggles to make ends meet for her children. Though she barely has money to buy their daily needs, she vows that no one from her kids should stop schooling. On the other hand, her daughter Carla (Pineda) realizes the need for them to find additional income so she decides to try her luck as a maid in Manila. But instead of raising her family's quality of life, Carla ends up in the hands of a cruel employer who almost kills her after several months of maltreatment. Discover how the pursuit of better opportunities could sometimes head a turn for the worse even to the best of people. Cast: Gina Alajar, Eliza Pineda, Dexter Doria, Mymy Davao, Joyce So, Alfred Labatos, Minnie Aguilar
9	"Plane Ticket"	Mervyn Brondial	Benjamin Benson Logronio	December 11, 2010
Francisca only wants to have a happy and complete family until a bad news came to her that her husband Tomas who is working abroad died and was buried by Tomas’ second wife in Indonesia. She felt miserable, but she continues to live life for her kids. Until she found a new love with Lando. Everything was almost perfect but after 20 years, she is surprised when one day Tomas came back to them-he is alive! Torn between Tomas and Lando. Cast: Tetchie Agbayani, Nonie Buencamino, Ricky Davao, Matet de Leon, Alwyn Uytingco, Kathleen Hermosa, Ketchup Eusebio, Gio Alvarez, Jaja Gonzales
10	"Parol" "Christmas Lantern"	Dado C. Lumibao	Maan Dimaculabngan	December 18, 2010
This is a poignant and touching story of a mother who tries to save the only inheritance she could give her blind son – their ancestral house. Cast: Enchong Dee, Helen Gamboa, Dominic Ochoa, Cherry Lou, Jommy Teotico, Ina Feleo, Nanding Josef, Neri Naig
11	"Ice Cream"	Nick Olanka	Benjamin Benson Logronio	January 1, 2011
This is a love story of Jonel, a gay cross-dresser, and Lory, a nurse, who started as friends. This is a love story of Jonel, a gay cross-dresser, and Lory, a nurse, who started as friends. Jonel faced difficulties when he had to decide if he should love Lory when in fact, he wanted to be with a man. Cast: Baron Geisler, Jewel Mische, Tyron Perez, Beatriz Saw, CJ Ramos, Sharmaine Suarez, Lloyd Samartino
12	"Internet Shop"	Dado C. Lumibao	Joan Habana	January 8, 2011
Nora, a cancer-stricken mother, secured the future of her children by chatting (and cybersex for that matter) with old and single foreigners. But upon learning that an American was arriving in the Philippines to finally marry her, she was forced to declare only one daughter and put her husband and other children to a painful and depressing isolation. This continued even during her own wake. Cast: Manilyn Reynes, Romnick Sarmienta, Khaycee Aboloc, Mark Joshua Sarayot, Joey Paras, Bugoy Cariño
13	"Wheelchair"	Veronica Velasco	Benjamin Benson Logronio	January 15, 2011
Collin doesn’t believe that there would be a woman who could love him for who he is. At the age of 14, his both legs were amputated after a bus accident. He and Mary Jane faced difficulties when Mary Jane's parents went against their relationship and but in the end, they stood up and proved to the families how pure their love for each other is. Cast: Ejay Falcon, Miles Ocampo, Allan Paule, Isay Alvarez, Kristel Fulgar, Hanna Flores, Justin Gonzales
14	"Pictures"	Dado C. Lumibao	Joan Habana	January 22, 2011
A heartbreaking story about how the relationship between mother and daughter can be destroyed because of their love for the same man. Carla who resists the charms of her suitor Marlon because of their age gap. Although she refuses to be committed to a younger guy, she tells him that it's okay for them to remain friends. But trouble begins when she discovers that her daughter Anna has developed romantic feelings for Marlon. Unexpected events turn mother and daughter into rivals vying for Marlon's love. Cast: Zsa Zsa Padilla, Empress Schuck, John Prats, Carlos Morales, Zia Marquez, Kaye Miranda, Mike Lloren
15	"Cupcake"	Nuel Naval	Shugo Praico	January 29, 2011
An unforgettable friendship between two impressionable girls. Daniella is a rich kid, who is content playing alone in the house since her parents have provided her with all the material things that she asks for. But her sheltered life begins to change as she meets their maid's daughter, Lira. With Lira as her playmate, Daniella gets exposed to street games, street food, and small carnivals, though her mom would often scold her about engaging in such activities. Things change when Lira accidentally discovers that Daniella's dad has an affair with another woman. Lira thought that as a friend, it was her duty to tell Daniella the truth but it only causes them to drift apart. Cast: Amy Nobleza, Abby Bautista, Lotlot De Leon, Eric Fructuoso, Ana Capri, Julio Diaz
16	"Tropeo" "Trophy"	Dado C. Lumibao	Rose Colindres	February 5, 2011
An extraordinary episode about young love. Solly, a pretty singer whose beautiful voice captivates the heart of a young boy named Jun. It's love at first sight for Jun so he immediately asks his father to formally introduce him to Solly. But because of their age gap, Solly doesn’t really take Jun seriously, thinking that his affection for her would fade in time. Cast: Nash Aguas, Toni Gonzaga, Sam Concepcion, Robert Ceña, Emmanuelle Vera, Yayo Aguila
17	"Kwintas" "Necklace"	Dado C. Lumibao	Shugo Praico	February 12, 2011
A Valentine's Day offering. Zandro, the notorious campus playboy who juggles three girlfriends at a time, crosses paths with Knoll, a pretty scholar whose innocence instantly captivates his fickle heart. Zandro promises that he will do whatever it takes to win her over. But the more he gets to know Knoll, the more he realizes that he doesn’t deserve someone like her because of his womanizing nature. Cast: Bea Alonzo, Zanjoe Marudo, Wendy Valdez, Guji Lorenzana, Jodi Sta. Maria, Cathy Remperas
18	"School ID"	Roni Velasco	Joan Habana	February 19, 2011
The story of a couple in a complicated relationship. May and Bobit, who would often break up because of their personal differences. But when May's father passes away, she realizes how much Bobit loves her as he shoulders some of her financial obligations and helps her find a teaching job so she can graduate from college. They inspire each other to become better persons as Bobit also pursues his dream to become a policeman. But their relationship is ultimately put to the test again when May discovers that Bobit had flings with other women. Cast: Melissa Ricks, Matt Evans, Charee Pineda, Tom Rodriguez, Helga Krapf, JM Lagumbay, Thara Jordana
19	"Tsinelas" "Slippers"	Nuel C. Naval	Janice Cortez	February 26, 2011
Jawo an ugly and impoverished will cross paths with the beautiful and wealthy Christie. Although they’re worlds apart, Christie will fall for Jawo's kindheartedness after he saves her life in an accident. It's as if they’re destined to change each other's lives as Christie teaches Jawo how to read and write; while he, in turn, lets her experience simple joys such as eating street food and laughing out loud. But because of their differences, Christie's mother, Amparo, disapproves of their relationship and will do anything to break them apart. Cast: Shaina Magdayao, Rayver Cruz, Jaclyn Jose, Bing Davao
20	"TV" "Television"	Jeffrey Jeturian	Joan Habana	March 5, 2011
Siblings who have grown to hate each other following the tragic separation of their parents. To make matters worse, they are forced to live with their relatives separately since they were kids. Marivic is raised by their mother's well-off family while Dindo is put under the care of poor relations of their father. Marivic becomes a snob because of her affluent upbringing while Dindo had to work for his adoptive parents’ restaurant at the age of nine. When Marivic treats Dindo like a helper and not as a sibling, he vows that no one can make him feel like dirt again and that he will do whatever it takes to become rich. Cast: Aiko Melendez, Dominic Ochoa, Gardo Versoza, Ella Cruz, Aaron Junatas, Carla Martinez
21	"Piyesa" "Piece"	Nuel C. Naval	Benjamin Benson Logronio	March 12, 2011
The life story of Star Power grand winner Angeline Quinto who struggled with her complicated family ties as well as her dream to become a singer. Cast: KC Concepcion, Irma Adlawan, Yul Servo
22	"Pasaporte" "Passport"	Lino S. Cayetano	Shugo Praico	March 19, 2011
A story that deals with familial love and personal values. Jay, a fresh grad who's determined to give his family a better life. In the beginning, he lands a profitable job in Macau which paves the way for him to gain his grandfather's respect. But he's eventually forced to resign from his job and come home a failure in his lolo's eyes. Jay immediately jumps at the chance to work abroad again as an old acquaintance offers him a teaching job in Beijing. But when he reaches Bangkok to meet his employer, he gets the shock of his life when he learns that he's about to be used as a drug mule by the West African Drug Syndicate (WADS). He is forced to swallow 61 large capsules containing drugs, which he is supposed to transport to China. Cast: JM De Guzman, Gloria Diaz
23	"Bulaklak" "Flower"	Dado C. Lumibao	Maan Dimaculangan	March 26, 2011
An extraordinary love triangle in a tale about falling for two men at the same time. Manuela, the town beauty in Saranggani who captures both the hearts of her close friend Isyot as well as the chief of police, Manuel. The conflict begins when Manuela has difficulty choosing between the two who seem to have her best interests at heart. As if things couldn’t be any more confusing, she agrees to marry both Isyot and Manuel when they finally proposed to her. Cast: Bangs Garcia, Gabby Concepcion, Rodjun Cruz
24	"Siomai"	Nuel Naval	Joan Habana	April 2, 2011
It will trace the humble beginnings of Pilipinas Got Talent Season 1 grand winner Jovit Baldivino. Jovit once sold Chinese dim sum via pushcart to augment his family's income. But even as a young boy, he already dreamt of becoming a famous singer despite his parents’ disapproval. Other people also tried to discourage him because of his looks and status in life. Cast: Carl John Barrameda, Malou de Guzman, Lito Pimentel
25	"Birth Certificate"	Veronica Velasco	Rose Colindres	April 9, 2011
Carol, who was given away by her mother when she was still a baby. History repeats itself when she's also forced to give up her own son because of her financial situation. The fact that Carol knows how it feels to have no family makes it more difficult for her to get over her guilt and longing for her child. Until one day, she finds herself taking care of a baby girl named Bronchelle. Cast: Pokwang, Melai Cantiveros, Nonie Buencamino, Ron Morales
26	"Medalyon" "Medal"	Jeffrey Jeturian	Raynier Avecilla	April 16, 2011
On Maalaala Mo Kaya, Jessy Mendiola and Ejay Falcon play a married couple, Lisa and Efren, who have sworn to love each other despite the disapproval of the former's family. Lisa's relatives want her to break up with Efren, thinking that he will only bring her harm. But the irony of it is that Lisa's father, Fidel (played by Mark Gil), seems to be the one who's set on ruining her life since he is deeply obsessed with her. To make things worse, Fidel is determined to break the couple apart even if it means hurting his own daughter. Cast: Mark Gil, Jessy Mendiola, Ejay Falcon, Dexter Doria and Ronnie Lazaro
27	"Tsinelas" "Slippers"	Dado Lumibao	Benjamin Benson Logronio	April 30, 2011
Edgar, an orphaned teenager who will take his younger brother, Dagul, on a journey from Novaliches to Samar by foot. With no money in their pockets, the two will go in search of their relatives, not knowing what kind of reception awaits them there. They are forced to rely on each other as well as the kindness of people whom they will meet along the way. Edgar vows that he will do everything he can to protect Dagul, but several unforeseen events will put their brotherhood to the test. Cast: AJ Perez, Bugoy Carino
28	"Piano"	Mae Czarina Cruz	Maan Dimaculangan	May 7, 2011
The story revolve on Charles who has a great passion for music. But a fire leaves Charles severely injured, including his fingers which affects his ability to play the piano. Since then, his self-esteem suffers a great deal and he often has difficulty getting into a serious relationship because of his insecurities. But just when he thought he would never love again, he meets the beautiful Andrea who’ll encourage him to revive his passion for music. Cast: Cristine Reyes, Sam Milby
29	"Krus" "Cross"	Nuel Naval	Arlene Tamayo	May 14, 2011
Susana, a devoted mom whose world turns upside down when her sons Roderick and Ray-an are both diagnosed with incurable diseases. Despite their lack of financial means, Susana will try her best to provide the best possible care for them. But things will get worse as she realizes that she's helpless in the face of her children's suffering. Cast: Ai-Ai de las Alas, John Arcilla, John Wayne Sace, Lester Llansang, BJ Forbes and Minnie Aguilar
30	"Necklace"	Jeffrey Jeturian	Joan Habana	May 21, 2011
Emily who is a feisty 22-year-old is always there to protect her best friend Diane, 18, whenever they find themselves in trouble. They’ve overcome so many hurdles together that they couldn’t think of anything that might ruin their friendship. But one summer vacation, Emily meets Dianne's father Teddy and instantly falls for his charming personality. So when Teddy declares his love for her, Emily agrees to become his girlfriend but she insists to keep their relationship a secret from Diane. Cast: Jomari Yllana, Trina Legaspi and Alessandra De Rossi
31	"Tindahan" "Store"	Nuel Naval	Rose Colindres	May 28, 2011
Imelda and Macoy who have a very close brother and sister relationship. Both of them have dreamed of raising their own families someday. As such, they couldn’t be any happier when they eventually found their respective partners in life. Cast: Kaye Abad, Ian De Leon, Desiree del Valle, Manuel Chua
32	"Tulay" "Bridge"	Jerry Lopez Sineneng	Dado C. Lumibao, Benjamin Benson Logronio	June 4, 2011
A lone boy searching for a family he never had. At the age of three, Nikko is abandoned by his mother in a makeshift movie house in Tacloban. He grows up searching for a place he could call home and a family who will make him feel loved. He meets a few people who could have given him what he longed for, but something always goes wrong along the way. There's Lola Aning whose relatives didn’t like him, a family of drug users and a couple who also left him in the end due to an unfortunate turn of events. Cast: Arron Villaflor, Nikki Valdez, Jairus Aquino, Lui Villaruz, Angel Sy, Izzy Canillo, Eric Fructuoso, Jeffrey Santos, Gilleth Sandico, and Matthew Mendoza
33	"Wig"	Dado C. Lumibao	Joan Habana	June 11, 2011
Gretchen has been semi-bald ever since she was a kid. Her rampant hair loss persists into her teenage years, causing her a lot of heartaches and discrimination by the people around her. Gretchen eventually discovers a temporary solution to her problem when her best friend gives her a wig as a gift. Cast: Nikki Bacolod, Ketchup Eusebio, Charee Pineda, Sharlene San Pedro, Nash Aguas and Keanna Reeves
34	"Traysikel" "Tricycle"	Dado C. Lumibao	Joan Habana	June 18, 2011
Darwin Calvario of General Santos City, a tricycle driver who tries his best to be a good provider to his wife Chona and their newborn baby. Earning money for their daily needs is difficult enough already, but his strength as a family man is put to the test when he finds out that his baby is suffering from imporforate anus (no anal opening) and needs to undergo an immediate operation. Amidst his frantic search for funds that would cover his son's hospital bills, Darwin stumbles upon a bag containing a huge amount of money in the backseat of his tricycle one day. It is a choice to use the money for his family or to return the money to its rightful owner Cast: Piolo Pascual, Maricar Reyes
35	"Palengke" "Market"	Nuel C. Naval	Arlene Tamayo	June 25, 2011
This is a story of Gamay who grew up in a fish port in General Santos City. She dreamt of having a good life that eventually she was able to achieve by being a fish vendor. But because of that, she didn't notice that she has neglected her family. Cast: Assunta De Rossi, Wowie De Guzman, Malou Crisologo, Aldred Gatchalian, Beverly Salviejo, Makisig Morales, Kristel Fulgar, Jommy Teotico
36	"Bisikleta" "Bicycle"	Dado C. Lumibao	Maan Dimaculangan, Arah Jell Badayos	July 9, 2011
Bert Sanchez, a former street vendor who achieved his dream to become champion cyclist in Asia. Bert believes that anything is attainable through sheer will and hard work. Tragedy strikes when at the peak of his athletic career, Bert is suddenly diagnosed with a serious illness and loses his right leg in the process. Cast: Joseph Marco, Jessy Mendiola, Jhong Hilario, Jaclyn Jose, Hermes Bautista, Marion Dela Cruz
37	"Toga" "Graduation Uniform"	Nick Olanka	Benson Logronio	July 16, 2011
Grace, an illegitimate child, fights for her right to dignity. Grace and Philip both long for the love of their father Manuel. But he already has a family of his own and barely gives them the time of day. Although their mom tries her best to provide for their needs, Grace and Philip can’t help but criticize her lack of courage to fight for their right to be acknowledged by their father. Cast: Erich Gonzales, Albie Casiño, Ana Capri, Cris Villanueva, Helga Krapf, Neil Ryan Sese, Celine Lim, Philip Nolasco, Noemi Oineza
38	"Callao Cave"	Manny Q. Palo	Joan Habana	July 23, 2011
The story of a much-admired tour guide in Tuguegarao. Andoy is a lonesome boy who was raised solely by his father, Jerry, who is seldom home. To chase away his misery, Andoy secretly signs up as the youngest tour guide to the famous Callao Cave. He's so good at entertaining tourists that he quickly becomes well known in their town. But instead of being proud of his son's accomplishment, Jerry is furious when he learns about the whole thing and even forces Andoy to quit his job. Cast: Zaijan Jaranilla, Zoren Legaspi, Wendy Valdez, Niña Dolino, Nanding Josef, Lui Manansala, Kyle Balili, Dionne Monsanto
39	"Make-up"	Raz de la Torre	Benjamin Benson Logronio, Arah Jell Badayos	July 30, 2011
Edison and Eric are identical twins. At first, the brothers were happy with the fact that they look alike and even used it to their advantage. They would exchange classes and do favors for one another. But everything changed when Edison confessed to everyone that he's gay. Eric had difficulty accepting his brother's sexuality as well as its adverse effect on his own reputation in high school. Cast: Carl John Barrameda, Maliksi Morales, Aleck Bovick, Jake Roxas, Regine Angeles, CJ Navato, Angeli Gonzales, Mark Sayarot, Julio Pisk
40	"Sapatos" "Shoes"	Nuel C. Naval	Ruel Montañez	August 6, 2011
A heartrending tale about a grandmother's love for her family. Gloria who spent most of her life taking care of her five grandchildren. The strength of her character is further put to the test when a road accident leaves her two grandchildren dead. Gloria's bent on pursuing criminal charges against the driver, Erning. It was truly a cruel twist of fate since Erning is also a good family man, who never meant to harm anyone. Cast: Gina Pareño, Nonie Buencamino, Nikki Bagaporo, Amy Nobleza, Rochelle Barrameda, Gemmae Custodio, Carla Guevarra, Ces Aldaba
41	"Kape" "Coffee"	Cathy Garcia Molina	Maan Dimaculangan	August 13, 2011
It will depict a tale of love between two friends. Apple, a nurse who has been secretly in love with her longtime friend/co-worker Rico. With the help of her friends, she finally captures his attention when she starts making changes with her looks. But Rico is already committed to another girl. Cast: Kim Chiu, Edgar Allan Guzman, Yayo Aguila, Allan Paule, Felix Roco, Beatriz Saw, Kitkat, Auriette Divina, Shey Bustamante, Mariel Pamintuan
42	"Balut" "Duck's egg"	FM Reyes	Mark Duane Angos	August 20, 2011
Witness how life hasn’t always been easy for Marcelito whose childhood was filled with difficulties and a deep longing to be reunited with his real family. To survive the streets of Surigao, he took up various odd jobs like working as a pin boy in a bowling alley and a balut vendor at one point in his life. He found comfort in singing Regine Velasquez's songs to pass the time, not knowing that it will lead him to instant fame someday. In the meantime, Marcelito did not give up his dream to search for his biological parents. Cast: JM De Guzman, LJ Moreno, Sharmaine Suarez
43	"Bibliya" "Bible"	Nuel C. Naval	Joan Habana	August 27, 2011
A son makes a sudden realization that his parents’ seemingly perfect marriage is actually filled with deceit and betrayal. Jason really looks up to his parents’ relationship. His father, Bong, is a pastor while his mother, Myrna, is a pious woman. But everything changes when Jason discovers his father's illicit relationship with a younger woman, Karen. In order to save his parents’ marriage, Jason decides to court Karen who eventually falls for his charm. Cast: Ian Veneracion, Martin del Rosario, Mercedes Cabral, Marlann Flores, Mara Lopez
44	"Tinapay" "Bread"	Nick Olanka	Benjamin Benson Logronio	September 3, 2011
This is a heartwarming love story of Evelyn and Eddie. Eddie likes Evelyn's friend Rosie who is in love with another man. Evelyn did not lose hope and gathered all her guts to show Eddie her love. Cast: Denise Laurel, Matt Evans
45	"Tumba-tumba" "Rocking chair"	Raz de la Torre	Benjamin Benson Logronio, Arah Jell Badayos	September 10, 2011
It will depict tale of the common love-hate relationship between women and their mothers-in-law. It tells the story of Ofelia who makes life a living hell for her daughter-in-law Becky. For some reason, she always finds fault in Becky even though the latter makes it a point to please her. But despite Ofelia's oppressiveness, Becky keeps her mother-in-law's maltreatment a secret from her husband Toto for ten years. Cast: Laurice Guillen, Charee Pineda, Janus del Prado, Tommy Abuel, Jobelle Salvador, Bojie Pascua, Ian Galliguez, Johan Santos
46	"Itak" "Machete"	Nuel C. Naval	Marie Ann Dimaculangan	September 17, 2011
A story of a man driven to seek revenge. Rene has had to deal with abandonment issues when he was still a young boy. He was eight years old when his father Maximino and brother Lito were left behind by their mother Rosella, who went to live with another man. Rene grew up with different families until he was adopted by his neighbors Maxi and Filemon. The young Rene not only finds a family; he is attracted to Maxi and Filemon's daughter, Jovel, and falls in love. Rene's feelings for Jovel grow stronger until he confesses his love for her. Jovel reciprocates. Rene loves Jovel like crazy, and they lived together as common-law spouses. Despite Rene's unconditional love, Jovel falls in love with another man—Rene's close friend. Devastated, Rene can't accept the fact that he was fooled by the woman to whom he gave his all and that he now experiences what his father had experienced with his mother. Rene's hatred prompts him to come up with a plan of revenge: kill Jovel's lover. On the day Rene would act on his plan, he accidentally bumps into a woman named Shieng. The lady happens to be dealing with heartbreak at that time. Cast: Rodjun Cruz, Nikki Bacolod, Jairus Aquino, Mika Dela Cruz, Julio Diaz, Pinky Amador, Manuel Chua, Akiko Solon
47	"Letter" "Sulat"	Dado C. Lumibao	Joan Habana	September 24, 2011
A story about family. Edlyn is a little girl who will do everything to keep her family together. She will struggle in the trials that will come in their family. Problem will arises as they try to solve their own problems. It will test the relationship of the family members in their love for their family. Cast: Sharlene San Pedro, Baron Geisler, Ina Raymundo, Deborah Sun, Paul Jake Castillo, Yen Santos
