= The Pin-Up Girls =

Filipino indie rock band

- Origin: Manila, Philippines
- Genres: Indie rock; Indie pop; Post-punk; Alternative rock
- Years active: 1995–2015; 2023–present
- Labels: Know-It-All Records; Sutton Music Group
- Spinoffs: Sugarfree; Ciudad; Tame the Tikbalang; Mass Carnage
- Members: Mondo Castro; Ryan Nachura; Pamela Aquino; Jennifer Tan; Mitch Singson; Ristalle Bautista
- Past members: Noel Garcia (deceased); Ramses Dela Torre; John Carpio; Jaja Manuel; Robby Mananquil; Julz Savard; Rydahl Bangkas; Japo Anareta; Raffy Bonifacio; Hiyasmin Neri; Hazel Silvestre

The Pin-Up Girls, sometimes called the Pin-Ups, was formed in 1995 by Mondo C. Castro along with Keltscross members Pamela Aquino and Jennifer Tan.

Dubbed the "first Philippine-based band to sign with a U.S. label", the Pin-Ups are also included in a UK-based compilation album and have released a single in 2015 with another U.S. indie label, HolyZone Records. The band in all incarnations, according to musician and critic Aldus Santos, "have always delivered on the tunes: familiar, always with a dash of innocence, with no facetious tricks up their sleeves, infinitely hummable. Not the most dynamic of bands, certainly not the most technically adept, but these deficiencies are countered by an undeniable charm on musical fronts that matter: melodic, lyrical, structural."

Despite the achievements and being well-connected, the band never became a "mammoth act" yet has enjoyed more success overseas than in their homeland.

== History ==
=== Early years ===
Starting out as a garage band in 1995, the band recruited guitarist Ramses Dela Torre (Mass Carnage) and drummer John Carpio (Tikbalang, Goo, End of Man) and started jamming at an abandoned hotel. The then unnamed band went through names that never stuck, including Ebenezzer Blue Cow, Blue Juice, Mushroom, and Bubblegum Crisis.

Guitarist Ryan Nachura and musician Noel Garcia (Ethnic Faces, Eraserheads and Color It Red sessionist) eventually joined the band, replacing Dela Torre and Carpio. They were without a permanent name until Tan wore a Bettie Page T-shirt to a rehearsal at then-Eraserheads drummer Raimund Marasigan's house. Marasigan suggested they name themselves after Page, one of the most famous pin-up girls from the ‘50s.

=== Hello Pain (2001) ===
After a few rounds of Mayric’s garage sales to raise money, The Pin-Ups wrapped up recording their debut album Hello Pain under their own label, Broken Records. The album was executively produced by ABS-CBN news anchor Liesl Castro and actor Diether Ocampo (he loaned Castro money for CD manufacturing), produced by Marasigan and engineered by Shinji Tanaka at Sound Creation studios.

The album includes "Witching Hour" that hit number one on NU107's Midnight Countdown for seven weeks; "Broken", "A Cold & Better Place", and "Ride Rocket Wild". The album’s artwork was created by Filipino graphic artist Leinil Francis Yu.

The music video for "Down", directed by Quark Henares, won "Rock Video of the Year" at the 2002 NU 107 Rock Awards.

=== Taste Test ===
Michael Sutton, a writer for the All-Music Guide, discovered them by accident on a random NU107 air check mailed from the Philippines by music fan Denis Batungbacal. Sutton signed the Pin-Ups to Tacoma, Washington’s Know-It-All Records in 2002, making them the first Philippine-based band to be signed to a U.S. label.

Aquino left for the U.S. and was replaced by Jaja Manuel (Girl in Park, who eventually signed with Know-It-All Records and released an album internationally) and Garcia was eventually replaced by Mitch Singson (Ciudad, ex-Sugarfree) as the Pin-Up Girls released their 6-track U.S. debut, Taste Test, in 2003. "Caress", written and produced by Castro, hit the top ten on NU-107 number one on Flashback Alternatives in New Jersey.

The EP's artwork was also designed by Leinil Francis Yu.

In 2006, the Pin-Up's drummer Noel Garcia died from a heart attack.

In 2004, Taste Test was reissued with several bonus tracks as Taste Test: Expanded Menu, receiving reviews in the UK. It was during this time that Manuel left the band and was not replaced.

=== Take on the Weakened Sky ===
In 2005, Sutton took the Pin-Ups with him on his own label, Sutton Records (later renamed Sutton Music Group), which released a Philippine-version of Taste Test in the form of Take on the Weakened Sky.

=== All Seats Are Taken ===
In 2006, the band fronted for Fra Lippo Lippi at the Araneta Coliseum as All Seats Are Taken was released in the Philippines by Sony-BMG. The 16-track album features guitarists Kakoi Legaspi (ex-Rivermaya, Peryodiko), Castro's cousin Kenneth Ilagan (ex-Violent Playground, Mulatto, the Dawn), and the late Francis Magalona. The songs were co-produced, mixed, and mastered by Angee Rozul.

Comic book writer and artist Arnold Arre was commissioned by the band to do the album artwork.

In June 2008, PULP Magazine featured the Pin-Ups on the cover.

=== UK compilation album appearance ===
Chris Williams of Manchester, England's Baby Boom Records contacted Castro through the Pin-Ups’ Myspace page. Williams requested the band's track, "Jackson Pollock 9", for inclusion on the compilation album Baby Boom Sampler No. 4.. The CD was launched at the SXSW Festival in Texas, U.S. and is still available in Manchester and through the Baby Boom Records website.

=== Jeepney Records ===
The Pin-Ups were included in the list of 7 winners of MTV Emerge and were set to sign with apl.de.ap's Jeepney Music. However, in an interview with Manila Coconuts, Castro revealed that apl.de.ap "dropped the 7 bands like a hot potato" and that his handlers said that "apl.de.ap refused to answer questions" about the event.

=== Mauling incident ===
On 17 November 2011, the Pin-Ups frontman Castro was mauled after a basketball game by 15 male models led by actors Kerbie Zamora and Lemuel Pelayo. Castro sustained numerous injuries and was rushed to hospital after he lost consciousness. Castro filed frustrated murder charges against the alleged perpetrators.

=== Overhaul ===
After founding member Jennifer Tan and ex-Sugarfree, Ciudad drummer Mitch Singson left the band around 2011 (Tan left for the U.S., Singson focused on his business), Your Imaginary Friends' Tanya Singh was tapped to play bass and fill-in drummer and Ex-Manibela Raffy Bonifacio officially joined the band. After a year, Singh was let go amicably, paving the way for an overhaul in terms of music and line-up. Instead of disbanding, Castro "reformed" the band under the name that the fans and friends had given the band: the Pin-Ups. At this point, long time fill-in musician Japo Anareta stepped in for bass duties.

2013 saw the entry of former JAM 88.3 disc jockey and Save Me Hollywood vocalist Julz Savard on vocals, acoustic guitar and keyboards followed by TV actress and host Hiyasmin Neri on vocals, ukulele and acoustic guitar. Savard left after 7 months to concentrate on her other band. Bassist Rydahl Bangkas joined for 3 months and was replaced by Hazel Silvestre. Savard was reportedly let go by Castro. This is a common theme running through both the Pin-Up Girls and the Pin-Ups; Castro is seen as a benevolent dictator when it comes to band dynamics as he had a hand in "kicking out" past members Garcia and Manuel.

Furthermore, it is known that Castro became a born-again Christian which in turn signaled a minor change in their songwriting process. Neri, Silvestre, and Bonifacio are also born-again Christians while Nachura is of the Catholic faith. The Pin-Up Girls have written songs that allude to religion, however the newer songs have been written with overt biblical references. With a new direction, the band name does not refer to the 60's pin-up girls anymore. Neri mentioned in a Yahoo PH interview that the band's name means that they have "a message, and we're pinning it up on the wall for everyone to see. We are the message!" That message being one with Christian leanings.

=== 2014 rebirth and release of "Can't Stand Waiting Here" (single) ===
With a new line-up in his arsenal, Castro sent demos to indie labels in the U.S. including HolyZone Records. Chip Flores, CEO of HolyZone Records, replied to Castro and said: "I get thousands of songs sent in every day. My staff tries to listen to as many as possible. The Pin-Ups’ music came through and we all had the same smile on our face like finally something different and fresh." Moreover, Peter Godwin of the '80s band Metro posited that the song was "Very retro! Could almost be the Buzzcocks!". The single "Can't Stand Waiting Here" was to be released and promoted in the Philippines and the US. However, it is not certain if the band was signed by Flores.

Notable online magazine Vandals on the Wall described the single as "sun-drenched indie pop informed by a swoon-worthy chorus and a driving backbeat. It delivers on the promise of accessibility and surprising melodic detours while also highlighting the band’s love for Britpop, indie-rock and new wave. At its heart is pure pop confection set to summer warmth: the kind that blasts on alt-radio and invites a crowd sing-along."

=== Break-up and Castro forming the Beautiful Letdown ===
After a successful relaunch, the band unexpectedly broke-up allegedly due to commitment issues from the other members. Reports mentioned that Castro was fed up with the tardiness and lack of commitment of the other members.

Castro formed the Beautiful Letdown, a band named after Switchfoot's album, right after the dissolution of the Pin-Ups in January 2016 but it took him a year to find the right members.

=== Castro joins Violent Playground ===
In July 2023, Castro was invited by frontman RJ Oca to join the reformed veteran group Violent Playground.

=== Reformation and Hello Pain vinyl release ===
Rick Olivares of Eikon Records Philippines announced that the band had reformed and will release their first album Hello Pain on vinyl in April 2024.

== Band members ==
Current members

- Pamela Aquino – guitars, vocals (1995–2002, 2023–present)
- Jennifer Tan – bass, vocals (1995–2009, 2023–present)
- Mondo C. Castro – vocals, guitars (1995–2015, 2023–present)
- Ryan Nachura – guitars, keyboards, vocals (1997–2015, 2023–present)
- Mitch Singson – drums, vocals (2003–2009, 2023–present)
- Ristalle Bautista - (2023–present)

Early members

- Iggy Bilbao - drums (1995)
- John Carpio – drums (1995–1997)
- Ramses Dela Torre – guitar (1995–1997)
- Noel Garcia (deceased) – drums (1997–2002)
- Jaja Manuel – guitars, vocals (2002–2004)
- Robby Mananquil (2009–2010)
- Raffy Bonifacio – drums (2009–2015)
- Tanya Singh – bass, vocals (2010–2012)
- Julz Savard - keyboards, vocals (2013)
- Japo Anareta (2013)
- Rydahl Bangkas - bass (2013)
- Hiyasmin Neri – vocals, guitars (2013–2015)
- Hazel Silvestre – bass guitar (2014–2015)

Session players

- Raimund Marasigan - bass, drums (1995–2004)
- Wuwu Ortiz (deceased) - lead guitar (1999)
- Jason Caballa - lead guitars (2001–2002)
- Carla Dela Rosa (2002)
- JunJun Regalado - drums (2002)
- Pot Quiambao - drums (2006)
- Matt Johnson - drums (2006–2008)

== Discography ==
=== Albums ===
- 2001: Hello Pain (Broken Records)
- 2004: Taste Test: Expanded Menu (Know-It-All Records)
- 2005: Take on the Weakened Sky (Sutton Records)
- 2006: All Seats Are Taken (Sutton Records, distributed by Sony Music Philippines)

=== Singles and EPs ===
- 2003: Taste Test EP (Know-It-All Records)
- 2014: "Can't Stand Waiting Here" (HolyZone Records)

=== Compilation appearances ===
- 1999: Ride Rocket Wild (songs from NU107's In the Raw) (Sony Music Entertainment)
- 2004: Jack Daniel's: In Session Manila ("Caress") (Jack Daniel's and The Gweilo's Hour release)
- 2007: Band Trip 2 ("Nilamon ng Gabi") (Sony-BMG Philippines)
- 2009: Baby Boom Sampler No. 4 ("Jackson Pollock 9") (Baby Boom Records of Manchester, England)

== Music videos ==
Videos	Directors
"A Cold & Better Place"	Erwin Romulo
"Down"	Quark Henares
"Love X Ten"	Edsel Abesames
"Ingay"	Ike Avellana
"The Five Minute Hallway" (Flip and Hand versions)	Alvin Tecson
"All Seats Are Taken"	Mondo Castro
"Can't Stand Waiting Here"	Paolo Jaminola & Mark Villaflor
