= Sugarfree (Filipino band) =

Filipino rock band

- Origin: Manila, Philippines
- Genres: Alternative rock; Pop rock; Pinoy rock
- Years active: 1999–2011; 2020–present
- Labels: EMI; PolyEast Records
- Spinoffs: 3D; Cambio; Ciudad; True Faith; The Pin-Up Girls
- Members: Jal Taguibao; Kaka Quisumbing
- Past members: Ebe Dancel; Mitch Singson
- Website: www.WeAreSugarfree.com

Sugarfree is a Filipino rock band currently composed of Jal Taguibao on vocals and bass guitar, and Carlo "Kaka" Quisimbing on drums. Former notable members include chief songwriter and frontman Ebe Dancel on vocals and guitars, and Mitch Singson on drums. The band reached its peak of success during the lineup trio of Dancel, Taguibao and Quisumbing.

Sugarfree had five albums throughout the course of their career: Sa Wakas (2003), Dramachine (2004) and the repackaged version of Dramachine (2006), Tala-Arawan (2006), Sugarfree Live! with the Manila Symphony Orchestra (2008), and Mornings and Airports (2009), all under PolyEast Records (formerly known as EMI Philippines).

The group went on hiatus in 2011 due to musical differences. Several members formed their own groups like Dancel became a solo artist and formed 3D, while Singson formed his own pop group Ciudad.

In 2020, after 9 years on hiatus, the band announced that they would reunite as a duo. Taguibao leads on vocals and guitars and Quisumbing on drums.

== History ==
=== Active years (1999–2011) ===
Sugarfree were a pop-alternative group formed in 1999. Their sound was heavily influenced by the likes of Popsicle, Eraserheads, Oasis, and Radiohead. The initial line up had The Pin-Ups' and Ciudad's Mitch Singson on drums. Singson left the band in August 2006 for personal reasons. Quisumbing immediately took over.

They were signed to Viva Records but their album was shelved. By 2003, with the help of Tracks Studio's Angee Rozul, their first offering was picked up and released by EMI Philippines (now known as PolyEast Records).

Sugarfree have worked with some of the Philippines' premier record producers such as Angee Rozul and Rico Blanco for Sa Wakas (2003), Buddy Zabala and Raimund Marasigan (members of the Eraserheads) for Dramachine (2004), Robin Rivera (also an album producer of the Eraserheads) for Tala-Arawan (2006), and Buddy Zabala and "Sancho" Sanchez for "Mornings and Airports" (2009). These albums have produced hit songs. "Hari ng Sablay" and "Makita Kang Muli", in particular, are the songs that brought Sugarfree into mainstream.

In 2007, Sugarfree held their first major concert at Music Museum. They shared the stage with the Manila Symphony Orchestra.

In 2008, Sugarfree created and released the song "Pugad" as endorser of Dencio's, a local restaurant chain. In the same year, Sugarfree revived the song "Bawa't Bata", an Apo Hiking Society original, as endorser of the milk brand Alactagrow. The band continue to endorse San Miguel Beer and Converse.

In August 2009, Sugarfree returned to the Music Museum with "Dekada: Sugarfree with the Manila Symphony Orchestra" which was a two-night concert in celebration of the band's 10th anniversary.

In 2010, Sugarfree together with other young musical artists sang ABS-CBN News and Current Affairs MTV for the 2010 Presidential Elections entitled as "Ako ang Simula". At the same time they also sang "Panata Sa Bayan" for the theme of GMA-7 Presidential Elections MTV, 50th Anniversary & its theme song of the GMA News & Public Affairs.

Ebe Dancel also sang the OST for TV5's "8 Kingdom", entitled "Hanggang Sa Dulo".

On March 1, 2011, Sugarfree held their farewell concert called "Paalam Pilipinas" at Eastwood Plaza, Libis, Quezon City.

=== Post Sugarfree (2011–2020) ===
After Sugarfree disbanded in 2011, former frontman Ebe Dancel became a solo artist. Dancel sang the song Purihin Ka, as a finalist in the UNTV's 1st Gospel Talent Show, ASOP: A Song Of Praise in 2012. He launched his album "Bawat Daan". Other former members of Sugarfree moved to another band after they disbanded in 2011.

Jal Taguibao, the band's bassist, moved on from the entertainment industry to academia. He is now assistant professor in the Department of Political Science, College of Social Sciences and Philosophy in the University of the Philippines Diliman. In June 2018, Taguibao received his Doctor of Philosophy (Ph.D.) degree in Political Science from the same university.

=== Sudden return (2020–present) ===
On February 25, 2020 the band made a surprise return as a duo of Taguibao and Quisumbing. The band released a new single "Nagkita Muli" on radio station Jam 88.3. In an interview with GMA News Online, Taguibao said they decided to resurrect it because "they missed it". The surprise return was met with mixed reactions, with Ebe's brother musician and lawyer Vin Dancel stating that PolyEast Records owns the exclusive rights to the band's name under the 2002 artist agreement.

== Band members ==
Current members

- Jal Taguibao – bass guitar, backing vocals (1999–2011, 2020–present); lead vocals, guitars (2020–present)
- Kaka Quisumbing – drums (2006–2011, 2020–present)

Early members

- Ebe Dancel – lead vocals, guitars, chief songwriter (1999–2011)
- Mitch Singson – drums (1999–2006)

Regular touring/session members

- Bodgie dela Cruz – guitars (2003–2010)

== Discography ==
- Sa Wakas (January 28, 2003)

(Singles : Telepono, Mariposa, Burnout and Taguan)

Sa Wakas (Eng: At Last) was launched at Freedom Bar in 2003. Sugarfree's first two singles "Telepono" and "Mariposa" became staples on every pop-alternative station in Manila and it wasn't long until they hit the mainstream with the hit song Burnout. Within the same year, Sugarfree won Best New Artist, Album of the Year, and Best Alternative Recording for "Burnout" at the NU Rock Awards. They also won Best Rock Recording for "Mariposa" at the Awit Awards. The song was inspired by Ebe Dancel's brother, Ian Dancel who is a professor.

- Dramachine (February 19, 2004) Repackaged Version released in January 2006

(Singles : Sinta, Hari Ng Sablay, Prom, Kwarto, Tulog Na and Makita Kang Muli)

It earned Sugarfree their first platinum record award (signifying over 30,000 copies sold) and made Sugarfree a household name. Dramachine churned out the hits "Sinta", "Prom", "Tulog Na", "Kwarto", and the massive hit "Hari Ng Sablay" (Theme Song of Comedy Movies Hari ng Sablay: Isang Tama, Sampung Mali with MV Appearance Joel Torre). EMI Philippines decided to release a re-packaged Dramachine album bearing additional tracks such as "Cuida" and the anthemic "Makita Kang Muli" (theme song of the TV series Panday). The AVCD also features a collection of the band's music videos.

- Tala-Arawan (November 24, 2006)

(Singles : Batang Bata Ka Pa, Kung Ayaw Mo Na Sa Akin, Dear Kuya, 'Wag Ka Nang Umiyak (later covered by KZ Tandingan and Gary Valenciano) and Nangangawit)

This album, which means "diary" in English, introduced Kaka Quisumbing as the band's new drummer. The first single "Kung Ayaw Mo Na Sa Akin" was launched simultaneously in more than 40radio stations nationwide. "Tala-Arawan" turned "gold" by April 2008.

- SUGARFREE Live! with the Manila Symphony Orchestra (August 2008)

On September 29, 2007, Sugarfree held its first major concert at the Music Museum. This was captured on a two-disc album with the same title, released the following year. The live album (exclusively distributed by Dencio's) comes with a Pugad Dencio's premium AVCD which includes the single Pugad, the Pugad Dencio's jingles edits, and behind-the-scenes footage of the music video and album launch.

- Mornings and Airports (July 24, 2009)

(Singles : Hay Buhay, Feels Like and Hang Over)

Their 4th studio album and 5th over-all album was released last July 24, 2009. Their lead single was Hay Buhay, their 2nd single and 1st English single, Feels Like, followed by their 3rd and last single, Hang Over. It was the last Sugarfree album before former lead singer Ebe Dancel decided to become a solo artist sometime in March or April 2011.

=== Studio albums ===
- Sa Wakas (2003)
- Dramachine (2004)

(Repackaged version released in 2006)

- Tala-Arawan (2006)
- Mornings & Airports (2009)

=== Live album ===
- SUGARFREE Live! with the Manila Symphony Orchestra (2008)

=== Compilation albums ===
- Sugarfree's Greatest Hits 2003-2011 (2011)

=== Collaboration albums ===
- Ultraelectromagnetic Jam (Sony Music Philippines, 2005)
- Pinoy Ako! Blue Album (Star Music, 2006)
- KaminAPOmuna (Universal Records, Inc., 2006)
- Pugad Dencio's (Single, 2008)
- I-Star 15: The Best Of Rock & Alternative Songs (Star Music, 2011)
- A Perfectly Acoustic Experience (PolyEast Records, 2011)
- Awit Kapuso: Kay Sarap Maging Kapuso (GMA Music, 2011)

== Notable songs ==
- "Hari Ng Sablay" (used on the film of the same name with actor Joel Torre, one of those who starred in that film appeared on the music video of the song.)
- "Tulog Na"
- "Mariposa"
- "Wag Ka Nang Umiyak" (covered by KZ Tandingan and now covered by Gary V. as opening theme for TV series FPJ's Ang Probinsyano)
- "Makita Kang Muli" (used in ABS-CBN 2's former TV series Ang Panday, now currently used as a 5th theme song from Eat Bulaga!'s Kalyeserye on GMA 7) - also covered by Neocolours was performed on MYX Live in 2012
- "Cuida"
- "Kwarto"
- "Kung Ayaw Mo na Sa Akin"
- "Dear Kuya"
- "Prom"
- "Pugad"
- "Burnout"
- "Hay Buhay"
- "Batang Bata Ka Pa" (originally by Apo Hiking Society)
- "Bawat Bata" (originally by Apo Hiking Society)
- "Tikman" (originally by Eraserheads)
- "Feels Like"
- "Walk Slowly"

== Music videos ==
- Mariposa (2002)
- Burnout (2003)
- Sinta (2003)
- Hari Ng Sablay (2004)
- Prom (2004)
- Tulog Na (2004)
- Kwarto (2005)
- Makita Kang Muli (2005)
- Dear Kuya (2006)
- Nangangawit (2006)
- Kung Ayaw Mo Na Sa Akin (2007)
- 'Wag Ka Nang Umiyak (2007)
- Pugad (2008)
- Feels Like (2009)
- Hay Buhay (2009)
- Hang Over (2010)
- Nagkita Muli (2020)

== Musical ==
In 2013, a musical based on Sugarfree songs was shown at the PETA Theater. Titled Sa Wakas: A Pinoy Rock Musical, it was shown to the public from until April 13–28.The music, which featured Sugarfree songs, plus a composition entitled "Bawat Daan" was used for the play. Bawat Daan later was used by Ebe Dancel for the title and lead single of his album, also of the same name.

== Awards and nominations ==
Year	Award giving body	Category	Nominated work	Results
2003	NU Rock Awards	Best New Artist	—N/a	Won
2003	NU Rock Awards	Album of the Year	"Sa Wakas"	Won
2005	NU Rock Awards	Song of the Year	"Hari ng Sablay"	Nominated
2006	MYX Music Awards	Favorite Music Video	"Hari ng Sablay"	Nominated
2006	MYX Music Awards	Favorite Rock Video	"Hari ng Sablay"	Nominated
2006	MYX Music Awards	Favorite Media Soundtrack	"Makita Kang Muli"	Nominated
2007	20th Awit Awards	Best Album Packaging	"Tala-Arawan"	Won
2007	NU Rock Awards	Vocalist of the Year	(for Ebe Dancel)	Nominated
2007	NU Rock Awards	Artist of the Year	—N/a	Nominated
2007	NU Rock Awards	Album of the Year	"Tala-Arawan"	Nominated
2007	NU Rock Awards	Best Album Packaging	(Inksurge.com for "Tala-Arawan")	Nominated
2007	NU Rock Awards	Producer of the Year	"Tala-Arawan"	Nominated
2007	NU Rock Awards	Best Music Video	"Kung Ayaw Mo Na Sa Akin"	Nominated
2008	MYX Music Awards	Favorite Song	"Wag Ka Nang Umiyak"	Nominated
2009	NU Rock Awards	Vocalist of the Year	(for Ebe Dancel)	Wonshared with Armi Millare
2009	NU Rock Awards	Best Album Packaging	(Inksurge for "Mornings and Airports")	Won
2009	NU Rock Awards	Artist of the Year	—N/a	Nominated
2009	NU Rock Awards	Producer of the Year	(Buddy Zabala & Romel Sanchez for "Mornings & Airports")	Nominated
2010	NU Rock Awards	Song of the Year	"Hang-over"	Nominated

Awards
Preceded by Boldstar (band)	NU Rock Awards; Best New Artist; 2003	Succeeded by Orange and Lemons
