= Kenneth Ilagan =

Filipino musician

- Born: July 28, 1971 (age 53)
- Origin: Philippines
- Genres: Rock
- Occupation: Musician
- Instrument: Guitar

Kenneth Ilagan is a Filipino musician who was the guitarist for the rock band the Dawn. Before assuming guitar duties for the Dawn, Ilagan also played guitar for Violent Playground, True Faith and Xaga (who then became Rivermaya).

Ilagan is a cousin of the Pin-Ups frontman Mondo C. Castro.

Ilagan now resides in the San Francisco Bay Area. He has a son with actress Jaclyn Jose, named Gwen Garimond Ilagan Guck, whom he is estranged with.
