= Pilat (Maalaala Mo Kaya) =

- Maalaala Mo Kaya episode
- Directed by: FM Reyes
- Written by: Mark Duane Angos; FM Reyes
- Original air date: October 19, 2007

Guest appearances
- Angel Locsin as Melody; Sam Milby as Jeffrey

Episode chronology
← Previous "Pulang Panyo"	Next → "Tren"

"Pilat" (transl. Scar) is an episode of the Filipino drama anthology series Maalaala Mo Kaya (MMK). It stars Angel Locsin and Sam Milby and it aired on ABS-CBN in the Philippines on October 19, 2007.

== Plot ==
Abandoned by their mother, and burdened with an ailing father, Melody (Angel Locsin) has to put aside her dreams and act as both mother and father to her family. She works as an assistant for a wealthy doctor. Melody experiences humiliation from her employer's family, who suspect her enthusiasm for her work.

== Cast ==
=== Main ===
- Angel Locsin as Melody
- Sam Milby as Jeffrey

=== Supporting ===
- Ronnie Lazaro as Noel (Melody's father)
- Chanda Romero as Estella (Jeffrey's stepmother)
- Juan Rodrigo as Dr. Sanchez (Jeffrey's father)
- Janus Del Prado as Mayong (Melody's older brother)
- Raquel Monteza as Esmeralda (Melody's mother)
- Cheska Billiones as Luisa (Melody's sister)

== Awards ==
- 24th Star Awards for Television - Angel Locsin Winner for Best Single Performance by an Actress.
