= Kristel Moreno =

Filipino actress and dancer (born 1991)

- Born: January 14, 1991 (age 35)
- Occupations: Actress, dancer
- Years active: 1999–2017
- Agent: Star Magic (2008–2015)

Kristel Moreno (born January 14, 1991) is a Filipino actress and dancer. A former child star and former Sexbomb Girl, she was relaunched as a member of Star Magic Batch 16.

== Filmography ==
=== Film ===
Year	Title	Role	Notes	Source
2002	Mama San	Crystal	Credited as "Crystal Moreno"	
2004	Lastikman			
2008	Teach Me To Love		Credited as "Kristal Moreno"	
2009	And I Love You So	Sexy Girl 3		
2009	Pitas			
2010	Cinco	Trisha	Segment: "Braso"	
2010	Shake, Rattle & Roll XII	Ces	Segment: "Isla Engkanto"	
2012	My Cactus Heart	Lucy		
2014	Nuno Sa Puso	Angel		
2015	Everyday I Love You	Linda		

=== Television ===
Year	Title	Role	Notes	Source
1999	Kids To Go	Herself	Credited as Cristel Moreno	
2001–02	Hershey's Kidz Town	Herself		
2003	Pira-pirasong Pangarap			
2003–04	Click	Claudine/Len Len	Credited as "Crystal Moreno"	
2007	Daisy Siete Presents: Tabachingching	Crystal		
2008–09	I Love Betty La Fea	Jen		
2009	Precious Hearts Romances Presents: Bud Brothers Series	Therese		
2009	Maalaala Mo Kaya	Pinky	Episode: "Diary"	
2009	Maalaala Mo Kaya	Maricel	Episode: "Tasa"	
2009	G&G			
2009	Precious Hearts Romances Presents: Somewhere In My Heart	Paula / Kristel		
2010	Maalaala Mo Kaya	Ballsy Aquino	Episode: "Kalapati"	
2010	Maalaala Mo Kaya	Ballsy Aquino	Episode: "Makinilya"	
2010	Precious Hearts Romances Presents: Love Is Only In The Movies	Liz		
2010	Maalaala Mo Kaya	Teenage Rosa	Episode: "Diploma"	
2010	Maalaala Mo Kaya	Shayne	Episode: "Bus"	
2010	Midnight DJ	Mella / Babaylan	Episode: "Tattoo ng Kulto"	
2010	Your Song Presents: Andi	Margaux	Episode: "You Are The One"	
2010	Precious Hearts Romances Presents: Kristine	Jasmin	Book 2	
2010	Imortal	Severina	Special Participation	
2011	Good Vibes	Carmi Pedroza	Supporting cast	
2011	Maalaala Mo Kaya	Aika	Episode: "Piano"	
2011	Star Confessions	Katherine Luna	Episode: "The Katherine Luna Story"	
2011	Wansapanataym	Dra. Bru	Episode: "Flores De Mayumi"	
2011	Nasaan Ka, Elisa?	Alex Perez		
2011	Maalaala Mo Kaya	Ella	Episode: "Baunan"	
2012	Oka2kat	Michelle		
2012	Wansapanataym	Zara	Episode: "Incredibelle"	
2012	Maynila	Gladys	Episode: "Reckless Heart"	
2012	Maalaala Mo Kaya	Myra	Episode: "Motorsiklo"	
2012	Precious Hearts Romances Presents: Hiyas	Portia		
2012	Enchanted Garden	Wendy		
2013	Maalaala Mo Kaya	Daughter	Episode: "Singsing"	
2014	Beki Boxer	Jessa		
2015	Wattpad Presents: Said I Love You			
2016	The Story Of Us	Stacy		
2017	Impostora	Fiona	Uncredited	
