= Kalapati =

- Maalaala Mo Kaya episode
- Episode no.: Season 18; Episode 20
- Directed by: Jeffrey Jeturian
- Written by: Joan Habana
- Original air date: January 23, 2010

Guest appearances
- Piolo Pascual as Benigno "Ninoy" Aquino Jr.; Bea Alonzo as Corazon "Cory" Aquino; Jim Paredes as José "Don Pepe" Cojuangco; Gloria Diaz as Demetria "Metring" Cojuangco; Jodi Sta. Maria as Kristina Bernadette "Kris" Aquino; Celine Lim as young adult Kris; Fatty Mendoza as young Kris; Liezl Martinez as Maria Elena "Ballsy" Aquino; Kristel Moreno as young adult Ballsy; Angeli Gonzales as young Ballsy; Yayo Aguila as Aurora Corazon "Pinky" Aquino; Krista Valle as young adult Pinky; Mikylla Ramirez as young Pinky; Dimples Romana as Imelda Marcos; Sam Concepcion as Benigno "Noynoy" Aquino III; Nash Aguas as young Noynoy; Madeleine Nicolas as Donya Aurora Aquino; Neil Sese as Soc Rodrigo

Episode chronology
← Previous "Bag"	Next → "Makinilya"

"Kalapati" (lit. 'Dove') is the 20th episode of the 18th season of the Filipino drama anthology series Maalaala Mo Kaya (MMK), and is the first of two parts of "The Ninoy & Cory Aquino Story". Written by Joan Habana and directed by filmmaker Jeffrey Jeturian, it first aired on ABS-CBN in the Philippines on January 23, 2010. ABS-CBN teamed with Swatch and collaborated with Jaime Zobel de Ayala and the Ninoy & Cory Aquino Foundation to bring the project to fruition.

== Plot ==
Ninoy Aquino and Cory Cojuangco met each other at a party in 1950. After marrying each other in 1954, Cory expected to live a simple life with her husband and family, only for Ninoy to enter politics, as mayor and later as senator. By 1972, upon the declaration of martial law in the Philippines by President Ferdinand Marcos, Ninoy was arrested under the Marcos regime, and their family lives were thus upended.

== Production ==
On December 10, 2009, Piolo Pascual confirmed during a press conference for his album Decades that he has been cast to play Benigno Aquino Jr. for Maalaala Mo Kaya; he had been the preferred choice of the Aquinos' daughters to play their father. Pascual also revealed that shooting would begin a week later. On January 7, 2010, Bea Alonzo was confirmed to have been cast as Corazon Aquino, though she had then yet to discuss with the Aquino family regarding the project.

== Release ==
"Kalapati" first aired on ABS-CBN in the Philippines on January 23, 2010.

== Critical response ==
Althea Lauren Ricardo of The Freeman gave "Kalapati" a negative review, stating that "whatever great love Ninoy and Cory had for each other, it was nowhere to be seen in Part I of the MMK special." She criticized Alonzo's continuously serious acting and felt that Pascual's performance was too self-conscious, with the latter's role being a potentially better fit for John Lloyd Cruz.
