= Oka Tokat (2012 TV series) =

2012 Philippine television drama series

- Title card
- Genre: Supernatural drama Horror fiction Action / Adventure; Thriller; Paranormal
- Written by: Libay Cantor; Maya Manulat; Rhoda Tanyag; Michael Transfiguracion
- Directed by: Ato M. Bautista; Theodore C. Boborol; Neal F. Del Rosario
- Starring: Paul Salas; Makisig Morales; Sue Ramirez; Jane Oineza; Joshua Colet
- Opening theme: "Oka2kat" by Tutti Caringal
- Country of origin: Philippines
- Original language: Filipino
- No. of episodes: 13

Production
- Executive producer: Minella T. Abad
- Cinematography: Gary Gardoce
- Editor: Richard Barnett
- Camera setup: Single-camera
- Running time: 1 hour
- Production company: LMD Unit

Original release
- Network: ABS-CBN
- Release: February 4 – May 5, 2012

Related
- !Oka Tokat

Oka Tokat (stylized as Oka2kat) is a Philippine television drama horror fantasy series broadcast by ABS-CBN. The series is remake of 1997 Philippine television drama series Oka Tokat. Directed by Ato M. Bautista, Theodore C. Boborol and Neal F. Del Rosario, it stars Paul Salas, Makisig Morales, Sue Ramirez, Jane Oineza and Joshua Colet. It aired on the network's Yes Weekend line up from February 4 to May 5, 2012.

== Overview ==
=== Synopsis ===
It focuses on five teens who need to retrieve stolen cursed objects and save the whole town from its near destruction at the hands of an unseen evil. Andrew (Paul Salas), a young bullied city boy, wants to have a complete family. When his parents got separated, he lives with his call center-agent mother Alice (Dimples Romana). Right after being bullied again, Andrew is enjoined by his mother to temporarily live in Pueblo Peligro with his grandfather Inong (Nanding Josef), who unbeknownst to them, secures cursed objects in a secret chamber in their family-owned local museum. As Andrew adjusts in his new world, he rediscovers his family roots, meets his "crush" and finds himself drawn to the cursed objects, which on one fateful night, are stolen leading to the death of his grandfather. With the help of his newfound friends Neil (Makisig Morales), Luna (Sue Anna Ramirez), Princess (Jane Oineza), and Joey (Joshua Colet), Andrew embarks on a quest to redeem the damned antiques and consequently give justice to his grandfather's death. But as Andrew and his friends reclaim those doomed objects, they are inevitably enmeshed in a life-altering, horrific and fun adventure, filled with seemingly insurmountable obstacles and schemes by an unknown force of evil that will put their friendship to the ultimate test.

=== Episodes ===
No.	Original release date
1	February 4, 2012
Andrew is an average kid whose life is turned upside down when his mother decides to let him live in Puerto Peligro with his grandfather and uncle. There, he hears voices, sees moving statues, and discovers a strange, hidden room.
2	February 11, 2012
Someone ordered to steal the 12 relics from Museo Peligro causing the creatures inside the relics to escape. Meanwhile, Andrew persuades her mom to not sell their house and seeks help from Luna, Princess, Neil and Joey for his quest to find the lost relics.
3	February 18, 2012
Unwary of the impending danger behind the Aghoy's deception, Dolores gives in to her heart's desires. She ignores Luna's warning at first, a decision that almost cost them their lives.
4	February 25, 2012
The recent "aswang" sightings prompt Andrew and his friends to rush the search for the missing relics. A fight ensues between the creature and the group, leading to a discovery that will change Andrew's life from this point on.
5	March 3, 2012
Jealousy gets the best of Celestina when she learns that Inong and Choleng are together. Using the relics as vessels for 12 evil spirits, Celestina curses Inong and Choleng's descendants. Choleng counteracts the spell with an unbreakable shield, protecting her family from imminent danger.
6	March 10, 2012
Andrew encounters Celestina in his sleep. Luna intercepts Andrew's dream and saves him from Celestina. Luna's visions reveal Michelle's real identity as the "aswang."
7	March 17, 2012
Michelle ends her ties with evil in hopes of saving her mother Midea from further danger. The hooded figure punishes Michelle and orders to bring Andrew and the remaining relics, or else it will cost her mother's life. Michelle, in her "aswang" form, uses Alice as bait to catch Andrew. Michelle's innate kindness compels her to help Andrew and his friends save Alice and Midea. She puts her life on the line while Andrew's necklace counteracts the hooded figure's spell.
8	March 24, 2012
Andrew and his friends discover that a relic doll, Quimana, has possessed Alice's body. As the doll's spirit continues to control Alice, a few lives are sacrificed. Hence, Andrew and his friends begin their quest to liberate the lost entity. In the course of the group's quest for the "nililiman," they encounter some peculiar creatures along the way.
9	March 31, 2012
Andrew and his friends face Punong Aba's challenge in order to save Alice's life. As Andrew deals with the ultimate test, he realizes that the means to save his mother will cost the lives of the "nililiman" entities. Seeing Andrew's compassionate heart, Punong Aba tells the group how to liberate Alice's body from being controlled by Quimana's spirit.
10	April 14, 2012
Andrew disappears after successfully defeating Quimana. He later finds himself held captive by a fairy who mistakes him for her lover. However, with the help of his friends, Andrew manages to escape. Meanwhile, Midea finally wakes up, but is confronted by the same hooded figure that killed her daughter.
11	April 21, 2012
Before getting killed, Lauro learns the true identity of the hooded figure through his magical glass. The hooded figure, who turns out to be Miranda, takes her magical cane and sees the past. After freeing Mayor Alfonso from possession of the relic dagger, Andrew uses his power to gather all the remaining relics. Neil and Princess discover Miranda's secret black magic room where they see Celestina through a magical mirror.
12	April 28, 2012
Miranda begins to bring doom to Barrio Peligro. Putting Neil, Harold, and Joey under the control of her black magic, she obtains the relics and captures Andrew in order to conduct the rituals for Celestina's return.
13	May 5, 2012
With the help of his friends, Andrew finally puts an end to the darkness that shrouds Barrio Peligro. He succeeds in defeating the powerful Celestina through the equally powerful magic of Choleng.

== Cast and characters ==
=== Main cast ===
- Paul Salas as Andrew Sandoval - "The Cool Guy". In his quest to feel love and acceptance, Andrew, who is technically skilled with computers, leads the group in search of the stolen cursed objects. He is the 13th relic.
- Makisig Morales as Neil - "The Nerd". Bookish and brainy, Neil finds comfort in acquiring tons of knowledge but aims to experience a more fun and adventurous life beyond books.
- Sue Ramirez as Luna - "The Clairvoyant". Haunted by her ability of foresight, Luna strives to accept and hone her talent while struggling to belong in the community.
- Jane Oineza as Princess - "The Queenbee". Rich, spoiled and popular, Princess aids the group financially. She secretly seeks to be appreciated by many.
- Joshua Colet as Joey - "The Brawn". In spite of the challenges of poverty, Joey utilizes his physical and inner strength to overcome the hand he's dealt with.

=== Supporting cast ===
- Dimples Romana as Alice
- Nanding Josef as Inong
- Janus del Prado as Harold
- DJ Durano as Mayor Alfonso
- Kalila Aguilos as Miranda
- Perla Bautista as Aring
- RJ Calipus as Tisoy

=== Guest cast ===
- Lauren Young as Celestina
- Bettina Carlos as Choleng
- Johan Santos as Young Inong
- Kristel Moreno as Michelle
- Miles Ocampo as Dolores
- Celine Lim as Violet
- Nick Lizaso as Lauro
- Dino Imperial as Young Lauro
- Tanya Gomez as Midea
- Justin Cuyugan as Andrew's father
- Princess Mazon as Andrew's father's girlfriend
- Mikylla Ramirez as Bully Girl
- Mark Joshua Sarayot as Bully Boy 1
- Alfred Labatos as Bully Boy 2
- Hermes Bautista as Pawid
- Mark Luz as Iman
- Martin del Rosario as Punong Aba
- Yen Santos as Kimana
- John Manalo as Young Alfonso
- Trina Legaspi as Young Alice
- Kristel Fulgar as Young Miranda

== See also ==
- List of programs broadcast by ABS-CBN
- List of ABS-CBN Studios original drama series
