= Prospero Luna =

Filipino character actor

- Born: Prospero C. Luna; April 20, 1934; Philippine Islands
- Died: July 23, 2010 (aged 76); Manila, Philippines
- Resting place: Manila North Cemetery, Santa Cruz, Manila, Philippines
- Other name: P.C.L.
- Occupation: Actor
- Years active: 1965–2009
- Spouse: Oliva Aguila

Prospero C. Luna (April 20, 1934 – July 23, 2010) was a Filipino character actor whose career extended from the 1960s into the 2000s.

== Early life and career ==
Among his best known performances are a long-running role in the popular Philippines series Buhay Artista.

Among Luna's best known films are three 1968 titles—Swinging Jet–Age, Gigolo–Gigolet–Nagkagulo–Nagkagalit and Buhay Bombero, as well as the title role in the Dolphy comedy Dr. Yes.

Luna emigrated to the United States to live in Oroville, California. In 2008 he featured in the American independent comedy picture Corky's Hot Ice.

== Death ==
He died on July 23, 2010, at the age of 76 due to stroke.

== Filmography ==
=== Film ===
2009 Corky's Hot Ice (Video) 
2009 Maalaala mo kaya (TV Series) 
2009  Temiong
2000 Tatlong puso, iisang pangarap 
1998 Campus Scandal 
1995 Run Barbi Run 
1993 Ingkong: Alpha at Omega 
1993 Enteng manok: Tari ng Quiapo 
1993 Home Along da Riles da Movie 
1992 Dito sa Pitong Gatang 
1988 Jack & Jill sa Amerika 
1979 Mahal... Saan ka nanggaling kagabi? 
1977 John and Marsha '77 
1976 Ngiti, tawa at halakhak 
1973 Pugante 
1972 Ang Boxer at Ang Sexy 
1972 Batwoman and Robin 
1972 Sanga-sangang pag-ibig 
1971 Ika-anim na utos 
1971 Simbuyo 
1971 Tukso 
1970 Tusko 
1970 Jacobina 
1969 The Musical Giant 
1969 Baron Gustavo 
1969 Mighty Rock 
1969 Gagamba at si Scorpio 
1968 Boogaloo 
1968 Buhay bombero 
1968 Daredevil 
1968 Gigolo - Gigolet - Nagkagulo - Nagkagalit 
1968 Giyera patani 
1968 Journey to Hell: The Lucky 9 Commandos 
1968 Swinging Jet-Age 
1968 The Karate Champions 
1968 Manila, Open City 
1967 Alexander Bilis 
1967 Check Point 
1967 Kung ano ang puno siya ang bunga 
1967 Let's Go Merry Go Round 
1967 Mr. 8 Ball 
1967 No Read, No Write 
1967 Pilyo Sa Girls 
1967 The 12 Golden Commandos 
1967 Solo Flight 
1967 Spy Killer 
1967 Pitong Zapata 
1967 Buhay artista 
1966 Shake Baby Shake 
1966 Sungit Conference (ng pitong dakila) 
1966 24 Oras (Segment 4)
1966 Apat na Ipo-Ipo 
1966 Alyas Don Juan 
1966 Code Name: Octopus 
1966 Jack En Poy 
1966 Nabubuhay sa panganib 
1966 Chinatown 
1966 Adyang Batibot 
1966 Mr. Humble Boy (Ang Dating Kampeon) 
1966 Napoleon Doble 
1966 Manang Biday 
1966 Mr Walastik Laging May Atik 
1966 Operation Butterball 
1965 The Sound of Buwisit 
1965 Humanda Kayo! Leon Sagrado! 
1965 Zebra 
1965 Tatlong mabilis 
1965 Samson at 7 Delaila 
1965 Tagisan ng mga agimat 
1965 Dr. Yes 
1964 Bandong pugante 
1962 Jikiri 
1958 Matandang tinale
