= Maalaala Mo Kaya =

Philippine television drama anthology series

- Title card in 2025
- Also known as: Maalaala mo kaya... (1991–2000); MMK; Memories; The Best of MMK
- Genre: Drama; Anthology
- Written by: Various
- Directed by: Various
- Presented by: Charo Santos-Concio
- Theme music composer: Constancio de Guzman; Egay Gonzales
- Opening theme: "Maalaala Mo Kaya" (Note: Performed by Dulce (1991–95) / Carol Banawa (2006–21) / JM Yosures (2021–22) / Sofronio Vasquez and Carmelle Collado (2025))
- Ending theme: "Maalaala Mo Kaya" (Note: Performed by Dulce (1991–2004; 2022) / Regine Velasquez (2001) / Carol Banawa (2004–21) / JM Yosures (2021–22) / Sofronio Vasquez and Carmelle Collado (2025))
- Country of origin: Philippines
- Original language: Filipino
- No. of seasons: 31
- No. of episodes: 1,362 (list of episodes)

Production
- Executive producers: Charo Santos-Concio (1991–2022; 2025); Eugenio Lopez Jr. (1991–1993); Eugenio G. Lopez III (1993–2013); Freddie M. Garcia (1997–2003); Luis F. Alejandro (2004–2006); Carlo L. Katigbak (2016–2022; 2025); Ruel S. Bayani (2019–2020); Cory V. Vidanes; Laurenti M. Dyogi
- Running time: 60 minutes
- Production companies: ABS-CBN Studios (1991–95); Dreamscape Entertainment (1995–2001); Star Creatives Television (2001–18); RSB Scripted Format (2019–20); RCD Narratives (2021–22; 2025)

Original release
- Network: ABS-CBN
- Release: May 15, 1991 – March 14, 2020
- Network: Kapamilya Channel (Note: Following the cease-and-desist order against ABS-CBN's free-to-air assets, the show resumed airing on Kapamilya Channel, with simulcasts on other local networks, such as A2Z, All TV (since April 26, 2025) and TV5 (since October 10, 2026).)
- Release: November 28, 2020 – December 10, 2022
- Network: iWantTFC / iWant
- Release: April 24, 2025 – present

Maalaala Mo Kaya (transl. would you remember?, abbreviated as MMK) is a Philippine television drama anthology series broadcast by ABS-CBN and Kapamilya Channel. Hosted by Charo Santos-Concio, its first iteration was aired from May 15, 1991, to December 10, 2022. The show returned for its second iteration on April 24, 2025, as a limited series for iWantTFC (now iWant) and consists of 13 episodes, and on April 26, 2025, on the network's Yes Weekend lineup. Its format is a dramatization of real-life stories sent in by letter writers. It is the longest-running drama anthology series in the Philippines.

== History ==
The program is named after the song "Maalaala Mo Kaya," originally by Constancio de Guzman. A version performed by Dulce was the program's theme until 2004, when it was replaced by Carol Banawa's cover. In 2021, JM Yosures' cover became the new theme. Dulce's version is still used in the final episode's closing credits.

In 2025, Tawag ng Tanghalan alumnus and The Voice US Season 26 grand champion Sofronio Vasquez and Tawag ng Tanghalan: The School Showdown grand champion Carmelle Collado sang the theme song for its limited series comeback.

Due to the COVID-19 pandemic in the Philippines, production of new episodes was suspended, starting March 14, 2020, with reruns airing until May 2, 2020. Three days later, ABS-CBN was shut down on terrestrial television after the network's 25-year franchise, originally granted in 1995, had expired and the National Telecommunications Commission gave a cease and desist order. The program was revived on Kapamilya Channel on November 28, 2020.

A classic re-run version of the anthology series, MMK Classics, premiered on June 3, 2012, on The Filipino Channel (TFC). To reach more international audiences, every episode was translated with English subtitles.

The Philippine version of the anthology, entitled "MMK Klasiks," aired on ABS-CBN's Kapamilya Gold afternoon block as a temporary replacement program from December 17, 2012, to January 18, 2013.

MMK Klasiks also airs on DZMM TeleRadyo as a fill-in to its radio counterpart, because the latter was pre-recorded. The Jeepney TV YouTube channel has The Best of MMK available to view.

On November 21, 2022, Santos-Concio announced the show's first iteration would air its three-part finale episode before the final episode on December 10, 2022, to focus on her role as Tindeng in FPJ's Batang Quiapo in the following year. A special "MMK Tatlong Dekadang Pasasalamat: Grand Kumustahan" was aired on December 24, 2022.

On April 26, 2025, the show would be revived for its second iteration after over two years of hiatus, with Charo Santos-Concio returning as host. It would be also simulcasted on All TV, thus marking the return to terrestrial television just a year after ABS-CBN Corporation and All TV's owner, Advanced Media Broadcasting System (AMBS), signed content agreements to air ABS-CBN programs on All TV.

On October 10, 2026, the show expanded its airing to TV5.

== Episodes ==
Translations of the Filipino titles are in parentheses.

=== Notable episodes ===
- "Rubber Shoes"

The first episode of MMK which aired on May 15, 1991, starring Robert Arevalo, Romnick Sarmenta and Vina Morales.

- "Regalo" (Gift)

MMK episode topbilled by Vilma Santos, Ricky Davao, and Maja Salvador and considered one of the most critically successful episodes. Originally aired on May 4 and 11, 2006.

- "Lobo" (Balloon)

The highest-rated episode in Mega Manila (47.9% as per AGB Nielsen). Starring Regine Velasquez and Piolo Pascual.
Regine won her first acting award at the PMPC Star Awards for TV in 2002 for this episode.

- "Pier 39"

10th Anniversary Presentation, starring Judy Ann Santos and Piolo Pascual. This was the first episode filmed outside the Philippines, shot in San Francisco, California. The episode tells about a caregiver who falls in love with a wayward man, despite being beholden to her elderly, wheelchair-using employer.

- "Ferris Wheel"

A Christmas presentation of Maalaala Mo Kaya which reunites ex-lovers Jericho Rosales and Kristine Hermosa.

- "Unan" (Pillow)

This episode, aired in October 2003, tells the life story of Julie Vega, portrayed by Angelica Panganiban. Michael de Mesa and Rio Locsin acted as Drs. Julio and Pearl Postigo, Vega's parents. This episode also showed original TV coverage of Vega's 1985 funeral.

- "Fried Chicken"

An episode about Maximo Gimenez, the founder of Max's Restaurant, who was played by Albert Martinez. After the Second World War, Max and his niece Ruby opened a fried chicken restaurant at the suggestion of American troops.

- "Pendant"

A Valentine's Day special about first love, and how to let go and take risks. It aired on February 14, 2009 and starred Jason Abalos, Ryan Eigenmann, and Toni Gonzaga. This was Gonzaga's first MMK episode.

- "Reseta" (Prescription)

A Mother's Day Special aired on May 9, 2009, starring Jodi Sta. Maria and Carmina Villarroel. Villarroel had not appeared on MMK since the 1990s.

- "Sapatos" (Shoes)

A Mother's Day Special aired on May 14, 2016, starring Kris Aquino. Aquino had not appeared in an MMK episode since the 1990s. It was based on the life story of Honey Grace Villarico. She managed the role of a single mother, facing all troubles alone, while also becoming a successful careerwoman.

- "Blusa" (Blouse)

A controversial episode starring Angel Locsin and Dimples Romana, aired February 28, 2009. It focused on a UP Los Baños (UPLB) summa cum laude graduate who applied as a Guest Relations Officer (GRO). UPLB released a statement doubting the credibility of the facts presented in the episode. On March 10, 2009, ABS-CBN issued an apology for not verifying facts beforehand with UPLB.
Angel won Outstanding Actress in a Drama Performance, given by the Philippine Psychiatric Association SiSA Award.

- "Ice Cream"

The life story of singer Jake Zyrus (formerly known as Charice Pempengco), aired in June 2008. Zyrus portrayed himself, and this was his first acting appearance. Zsa Zsa Padilla played Zyrus' mother, and Rhap Salazar played his younger brother. The story showed him growing up in a middle-class family before his successful singing career.

- "Teddy Bear"

This is the story of comedian Pokwang, portrayed by herself.

- "Kwintas" (Necklace)

This is the first episode featuring Sarah Geronimo, and also starred John Lloyd Cruz.

- "Gitara" (Guitar)

This is the real-life story of Tara Santelices, who was in a coma for a year after being shot in the head by a mugger on August 6, 2008. She was portrayed by Karylle.

- "Upuan" (Chair)

This episode featured former senator Renato Cayetano, portrayed by Ronaldo Valdez. It showed Cayetano's battle with hepatitis and how his son helped him. The son, Lino, was portrayed by John Lloyd Cruz. The episode was directed by Lino Cayetano himself.

- The Ninoy and Cory Aquino Story

On January 23 and 30, 2010, respectively, a two-part episode of the life story of former Senator Ninoy Aquino and former President Corazon Aquino was aired for Cory's 77th Birthday. The first part was "Kalapati" which featured the humble beginnings of the said couple, from their marriage up to their political conflicts. The second part was "Makinilya" which depicted the latter days of Ninoy and the end of Martial Law. The series also featured real footage of the events that occurred during martial law and during Cory's success in the presidential race. Piolo Pascual portrayed the role of Ninoy Aquino while Bea Alonzo played the role of Corazon Aquino.

- "Cupcake"

A story about an unforgettable friendship between two young girls. Daniela (portrayed by Abby Bautista), a rich girl who is usually content with playing by herself, has her life changed when she befriends her family's maid's daughter, Lira (portrayed by Amy Nobleza). With Lira as her new friend, Daniela gets exposed to activities outside her home, such as street games and carnivals. But their friendship is put to the test when Lira finds out that Daniela's dad has had an affair with another woman. The episode aired on January 29, 2011.

- "Tsinelas" (Slippers)

The story of two homeless brothers, 17-year-old Edgar and 11-year-old Dagul. The brothers suffered with no food or money while traveling from Manila to Samar, trying to find a better life. This is the posthumous work of actor AJ Perez, who died in a car crash on April 17, 2011.
In 2013, another episode was also titled "Tsinelas." This was the story of the late Jesse Robredo, portrayed by Jericho Rosales.

- "Krus" (Cross)

The 2011 Mother's Day Special, featuring Ai-Ai delas Alas, John Arcilla, John Wayne Sace and Lester Liansang. A story about a struggling mother whose kids were not blessed with perfect health.

- "Kuweba" (Cave)

A special episode about a Muslim family struggling through social and political turmoil. It reunited actors Robin Padilla and Vina Morales, who had not worked together for nearly two decades. This episode was aired on November 12, 2011.

- "Singsing" (Ring)

The love story of Etrona and Panyong, who found happiness in each other's company until their last breath. This episode, which was aired on November 19, 2011, is directed by Jeffrey Jeturian and stars Philippine veteran actors Eddie Garcia and Gloria Romero.

- "Lente" (Lens)

The life story of Claudio C. Cañedo, an aspiring model portrayed by McCoy De Leon. This episode aired on August 9, 2012. Claudio faces the challenges of a person exploring the world, trying to figure out what and who he really wants. Claudio has an identity crisis and then realizes he is gay. He has had some same-sex relationships in the past, but when he meets a guy from Laguna, he changed for good.

- "T-shirt"

This story is about Gigi, a girl who got pregnant at a young age due to being raped repeatedly by her employer. Sharlene San Pedro, who played Gigi, was recognized internationally; she was nominated in the 17th Asian Television Awards for Best Actress in a Lead-Drama Role. This episode aired on April 21, 2008.

- "Manika" (Doll)

A 15-year-old girl named Nene, portrayed by Jane Oineza, was recurrently raped by her stepfather. Her world changed when her mother, portrayed by Angel Aquino, even assisted the stepfather in the act of rape. Since then, Nene cursed the 'beauty' that she possesses.
The episode was slated to air on June 2, 2012, but was pulled after the MTRCB gave it an 'X' rating due to its sensitive theme. After re-editing it was given an 'SPG' rating, and aired on June 30, 2012.
This episode is the show's all-time highest-rated episode (40% per Kantar-TNS, and 27.1% in Metro Manila per AGB Nielsen). Viewers praised the acting performances and the risky move by ABS-CBN to air such an episode. It was MMK's first episode nominated for Best Drama at the International Emmy Awards.

- "Singsing" (Ring)

The life story of TESDA Director General Joel Villanueva, portrayed by Diether Ocampo, and his wife Gladys, portrayed by Maricar Reyes. Joel and Gladys had been married for seven years and could not conceive a child. But, through Joel's deep faith, they were given a baby.

- "Sanggol" (Baby)

The story of former MTRCB Chairman Grace Poe, portrayed by Erich Gonzales. Grace Poe was elected as senator in 2013.

- "Lubid" (Rope)

The story of Tourette syndrome victim Jerome Concepcion, portrayed by Gerald Anderson. This episode aired on November 7, 2009.

- "Flash Cards"

Former teacher Fidel, portrayed by actor-singer Ariel Rivera, survives a heart attack. Despite his doctor's warning, stressful activity causes him to suffer from a stroke. His comprehension and speech are affected, and his daughter, Jonah, becomes his own teacher at home.

- "Scrapbook"

The life story of Korean superstar Sandara Park.

- "Red Envelope"

The story of Lyca Gairanod, the first grand champion of The Voice Kids Philippines. Lyca is a small kid with big dreams from Tanza, Cavite. She gained popularity for her heartfelt, amazing performances in The Voice Kid and for her humble background as a daughter of a fisherman. The episode aired on August 16, 2014.

- "Bintana" (Window)

The first episode of MMK to be aired in high definition as ABS-CBN HD in widescreen format on October 3, 2015. Stars Tonton Gutierrez, Agot Isidro, Diego Loyzaga and Sofia Andres.

- "Pasa" (Bruise)

This episode aired on May 21, 2016. It tells the life story of Rommel, portrayed by Raikko Mateo and Diego Loyzaga. Rommel grew up in an unconventional family, with two mothers and a father. His family crumbles due to his father's abusive behavior and vices, but Rommel let the adversity in his life make him whole.

- "Kweba"

Aired on June 18, 2016, starring Zanjoe Marudo as Mang Juan. Despite being illiterate, Mang Juan is a loving father who would do anything to raise his children. This episode became the show's second highest-rated episode ever, garnering 38.3% per Kantar-TNS. It became a social media frenzy, and made Marudo the most recently nominated Filipino at the International Emmy Awards for television acting, as of 2024.

- "Korona" (Crown)

Aired on June 3, 2017, this episode tells the life story of Pia Wurtzbach, portrayed by Liza Soberano. Pia started working in showbusiness at the age of 12. After 3 failed attempts, her dream of becoming a beauty queen became a reality when she was crowned Miss Universe 2015. She was the third Filipina to win.

- "Passport"

Aired on June 2, 2019. Irma Adlawan portrays the teacher Nena, who retires and puts up her own business to spend more time with her family. She finds a high paying job as a caregiver in the U.S., hoping to regain everything she lost on an investment. But things do not go as planned when Nena learns that the person who recruited her is a human trafficker. The trafficker, portrayed by Agot Isidro, forces her to work as a house help for an abusive Filipino family.

=== Award-winning episodes ===
- "Abo" (Ash)

Roderick Paulate was awarded Best Drama Performance By An Actor at the first Asian Television Awards in 1996. He played the role of an indigenous Aeta, a victim of the eruption of Mount Pinatubo.

- "Wristwatch"

Roderick Paulate again won Best Drama Performance By An Actor at the fifth Asian Television Awards in 2000.

- "Song Book"

Aiza Seguerra was awarded Best Drama Performance By An Actress at the seventh Asian Television Awards in 2002.

- "Rehas" (Jail Bars)

Gina Pareño was awarded Best Drama Performance By An Actress at the 12th Asian Television Awards in 2007.

- "Pilat" (Scar)

Angel Locsin won her first acting award, Best Single Performance By An Actress, at the 22nd PMPC Star Awards for Television.

- "Lobo" (Balloon)

The episode stars Regine Velasquez and Piolo Pascual. Regine won Best Single Performance By An Actress at the 16th PMPC Star Award for Television. This was her first MMK episode.

- "Skating Rink"

John Lloyd Cruz won Outstanding Lead Actor In A Drama Special at the 2nd Enpress Golden Screen Entertainment TV Awards in 2005. He played the role of Jonel, a man with cerebral palsy who had a hidden talent in ice skating.

- "Sako" (Sack)

This episode, starring Jay Manalo and Joshua Dionisio, was awarded at the 17th KBP Golden Dove Awards. It tells the story of an abusive father who keeps his children working while he spends all their hard-earned money.

- "Regalo" (Gift)

Starring Vilma Santos with Maja Salvador. This episode won the Best TV Drama Program at the 15th KBP Golden Dove Awards, and Vilma won Best Single Performance By An Actress at the 20th PMPC Star Awards for Television in 2006.

- "Lupa" (Soil)

Starring Ketchup Eusebio, Gina Pareño, Nikka Valencia and Jan Marini, the episode was nominated as Best Drama Series in the 4th Seoul International Drama Awards in 2009. The story is about a boy that returns to a poor neighborhood in Bicol in order to make his sick mother's wish come true.

- "Basket"

Starring Judy Ann Santos, Caridad Sanchez, Kier Legaspi and Nikka Valencia, this episode won the 2001 Catholic Mass Media Awards for Best Drama and the 2001 KBP Golden Dove Awards Best Drama Program. In 2002 it also became a finalist at the Magnolia Award for Best Film for TV at the 9th Shanghai Television Festival.

- "Kotse-kotsehan"/"Litrato" (Toy Car / Picture)

A two-part special episode depicting two perpectives of a mother's love for her children. It starred Angel Locsin and Dimples Romana. Litrato was about Idai's (Dimples Romana) quest to find her lost son, while Kotse-kotsehan is about Samina's (Angel Locsin) point of view of the story, in which she found Idai's son and raised him. Samina was caught with her younger sister Aisah and charged with kidnapping.
Angel won 5 Best Actress Awards in total for her performance (Gawad Lasallianeta, Edukcircle Awards, GEMS Awards, the 26th KBP Golden Dove Awards, and the 6th Gawad Tanglaw).

=== Best of MMK ===
As listed on the official website of the show:

"Rubber Shoes"

- In this very first episode of Maalaala Mo Kaya aired on May 15, 1991, Romnick Sarmenta plays Allan, a social climber who is ashamed of his impoverished state and pretends to be well-off to blend in with his rich friends in school. His father, a street sweeper, works very hard to meet his luxurious needs. Only when it is too late does Allan realize that money does not necessarily make a man happy.

"Sako" (Sack)

- Miong (Jay Manalo) and his entire family work as tenants for a sugarcane plantation in Negros Occidental. The eldest child, Giling (Joshua Dionisio) is forced by his father to give up schooling to help in the farm. Giling suffers maltreatment not only from the abusive people in the plantation but from his own father, who is so consumed by his obsession for money and power. When their family is struck by a tragedy, Giling vows to rise above the oppression.

"Regalo" (Gift)

- Daisy Hernandez (Vilma Santos), a mother, must divide her time between work and taking care of her daughter April (Maja Salvador), who has cerebral palsy. Daisy's heart is wrenched every time she sees her eldest child suffer because of her illness. But Daisy never loses hope, and April manages to live a normal life until she is 18. Just when Daisy thought things are doing fine with her daughter's disability, a tragedy will further test her faith.

"Pier 39" (MMK's first out of the country episode aired on July 26, 2001)

- When Miguel (Piolo Pascual) gets petitioned by his father to the States, he thought that his dad intended to make up for all the lost time between them. However, he is treated so badly that he would rather be homeless than live with his father and his nasty second wife. Miguel would have starved to death if not for Arlene (Judy Ann Santos), who helps him pick up the pieces of his life. Together they are able to conquer their fears and create something beautiful out of their miserable past.

"Baul" (Chest)

- Years after a heart-wrenching incident, Minda (Charo Santos-Concio) returned to her hometown to make Letty (Coney Reyes) pay for stealing her fiancé (Ricky Belmonte) away from her. But it was not sweet revenge because their friendship mattered more than the man who came between them. Would Letty and Minda truly open their hearts and let the healing begin?

"Unan" (Pillow) (portrayal of Julie Vega's life story)

- Angelica Panganiban
- Ever since she was young, people had noticed her talent. Her family called her Little Darling. Julie Pearl Postigo, better known as Julie Vega, began her show business career at the age seven. She was discovered by a talent coordinator and offered her a commercial stint. She personally felt the love of working for television. As a young child, she would pray that she get the roles she auditions for. Her first film project was Ang Mga Mata ni Angelita. From then on, her popularity was irrepressible. She was dubbed as "the grown up little girl" due to her mature drama roles at a young age. The most tragic part of her life was the death of her brother. Julie deeply mourned. One day, she felt weak and weaker as the days passed. At the height of her career in 1985, Julie died on the May 6. Until now, her family never revealed her illness.

"Sing-along Bar" (portrayal of Ai-Ai delas Alas's life story)

- When Ai-Ai, played by Maricel Soriano, was young, she was given away by her biological mom to her aunt. As she was growing up, she considered herself unlucky for always getting caught in a series of unfortunate events. She cannot also find a decent job to help her earn a living. Until one day, she was offered a job in a comedy bar. A famous person discovered her talents and offered her to sing in a concert. This paved her way to TV shows and films where she started very low. Later on, she will meet a man that she will marry and from then on, she considers her life a roller coaster. Amidst all the challenges she is facing, she made her way on top of her dreams.

"Sa Kandungan mo, Inay" (My Mother's Lap)

- Sisters Millet (Janice de Belen), and Cielo (Charo Santos-Concio) despised their mother (Anita Linda) because of her cruelty towards them. Millet especially envied her sister Leslie (Dina Bonnevie), because she was their mom's favorite and received special treatment.

"Retaso" (Remnant)

- Since the beginning of her relationship with Dado (Joel Torre), a widower, Anita (Nora Aunor) knew that she would become a step-mother to his three children. It was hard for Anita to win the love of the children, but they felt Anita's genuine concern and eventually opened up to her. But just when things were slowly falling into place, she discovers that Dado has been cheating on her. Will she be able to turn her back on the children, whose lives now depend on her?

"Burda" (Pillowcase)

- Lita (Sharon Cuneta) has been taking care of Stephen (Patrick Garcia) since he was a baby because his parents are always busy with work and going out of the country. Even though she is just his yaya, Lita looked after Stephen like a real mother. Stephen eventually reaches his teens and Lita is often caught in between her ward and his parents' differences. An incident makes Lita realize her limitations as yaya and instills in her the hard lesson of letting go.

"Lapida" (Gravestone)

- Jan (Phillip Salvador), a single parent, earns a living as a fireman. During a mission, he is able to save the lives of Annie (Kris Aquino) and her son after Annie's husband, Tony, set their house on fire. Tony was then killed by an exploding bulb. But unbeknownst to him, his son sneakily followed him inside the burning house to help him after he gets passed through the firemen and dies. Annie in return helps him with his grief and they become close friends. As their friendship blossoms into love, will Annie and Jan be able to reconcile their differences and make their relationship work?

"Bisikleta" (Bicycle)

- When Abel (Dolphy) caught his wife cheating on him with his best friend Carding, he angrily drove them away and was left with a son to care for. He would have made amends with Liza for their son's sake, but an unfortunate circumstance got him imprisoned for 40 years. As soon as he got out, however, he sought his family again to prove his innocence to his son, whom he lived for all this time.

== Specials ==
=== 10th Anniversary Celebration ===
On October 11, 2001, MMK marked their 10th anniversary on television by presenting a TV Special entitled " Isang Dekada ng Ginintuang Alaala".

=== 15th Anniversary Celebration ===
On May 13, 2006, MMK marked their 15th anniversary on television by presenting a two-part special episode that stars Vilma Santos, Ricky Davao and Maja Salvador entitled “Regalo” (Gift). The story was about Daisy Hernandez, a mother who devoted most of her time to her daughter.

=== 16th Anniversary Celebration ===
In 2007, MMK presented an episode of their 16th anniversary entitled “Rehas” (Jail) where actress Gina Pareño played the story of a mother who struggles to take care of her three mentally ill children in Aklan. Her acting won her Best Drama Performance by an Actress at the 12th Asian Television Awards while director Jerry Lopez Sineneng won the Best Direction in 2008. Also for this episode, MMK won the Special Award in Drama at the 2008 Seoul International Drama Awards.

=== 18th Anniversary Celebration ===
In 2009, MMK celebrated their 18th anniversary by presenting five special episodes and four of which were filmed in the United States, in association with The Filipino Channel.

"Pansit" (August 1, 2009)

- Erich Gonzales, Ai-Ai delas Alas
- A story about an 18-year-old debutant who struggles to cope in adolescence due to money problems, including her own debut.

"Cap" (August 8, 2009)

- Noel Trinidad, Nanding Josef, Joji Isla, Lucita Soriano, Louella Albornoz and Prospero Luna
- A story of Filipino World War II veterans living in San Francisco, California and their fight for equal benefits from the United States.

"Apron" (August 15, 2009)

- G. Toengi, Ryan Eigenmann
- A story of a couple having a life in America and the struggles they face while living their American Dream.

"Letters" (August 22, 2009)

- Princess Punzalan, Michael de Mesa
- A story of a woman struggling in her own divorce and finding love again.

"Car" (August 29, 2009)

- Gina Alajar, Lauren Young, Ilonah Jean and Anne Walters
- A story of a friendship between a Filipino caregiver and a patient with Parkinson's disease.

=== 20th Anniversary – Dalawang Dekada ===
==== Documentary ====
On September 25, 2011, Sunday's Best, Maalaala Mo Kaya aired its 20th anniversary documentary special called MMK 20: Maalaala Mo Kaya Dalawang Dekada on ABS-CBN. During the documentary special, it features different segments including the highlights of the best episodes in the series, commentaries from the artists, director and producers who contributed to the program and featured stories relayed in the program for 20 years. Segment hosts are Sarah Geronimo for dramatic episodes, Angelica Panganiban for romance and comedy episodes, Vhong Navarro for MMK's episode titles, KC Concepcion for celebrity portrayals, Piolo Pascual for love stories by the period of time, and Sam Milby for out of the country episodes. The last part of the special is an interview with Vilma Santos with the program's main host Charo Santos.

==== Celebration ====
Similar to its 18th anniversary celebration, the show's 20th anniversary was celebrated with five special episodes taped in varying locations in the Philippines and abroad including Bukidnon, Palawan, Japan, and Spain.

"Tungkod" (October 1, 2011) (Palawan)

- Angel Aquino, Yul Servo
- The episode features Angel Aquino who plays a mother who opposes mining in Palawan while experiencing a series of unfortunate events. This episode is directed by 62nd Cannes Film Festival best director Brillante Mendoza.

"Tap Dancing Shoes" (The Happy Feet Story) (October 8, 2011) (Bukidnon)

- John Prats, Nash Aguas, Ariel Rivera
- The episode features the life story of Ramon and Bambi, the tap-dancing brothers also known in the Philippines as Happy Feet from Bukidnon, a runner-up at Pilipinas Got Talent Season 2 played by John Pratts & Nash Aguas. The episode is directed by Dado Lumibao.

"Susi" (October 15, 2011) (Barcelona)

- Jake Cuenca, Ricky Davao
- The episode features the story of Louie, a cross-dresser who lives in Barcelona and his how he lives his alternative life only trying to please his father in order to accept him portrayed by Jake Cuenca. The episode is directed by Dado Lumibao.

"Liham" (October 22, 2011) (Aurora)

- KC Concepcion, Dina Bonnevie, Paulo Avelino
- A special episode featuring the life story of a woman named Aurora who empowered herself by making her dreams happen. This episode is directed by Jerry Lopez Sineneng. It was the first mother role for actress KC Concepcion and Paulo Avelino's first acting project as a Kapamilya.

"Passbook" (October 29, 2011) (Japan)

- Rio Locsin, Desiree del Valle, Ya Chang
- A special episode aired about the story of Anita, single parent of five children working and struggling in Japan who had a second chance on her love life. The episode is directed by Nuel C. Naval.

== Films ==
=== Maalaala Mo Kaya: The Movie (1994) ===
As part of the third anniversary of the program, a film version was created, produced by Star Cinema and directed by Olivia Lamasan. The film was released on June 22, 1994. The plot revolves around the story of Ana, a young girl who took the responsibility of being the mother of her cousin Marissa's son while Marissa latter spent her life in Japan as an entertainer. It stars Aiko Melendez, Richard Gomez and Chin-Chin Gutierrez. The film was one of the entries for the 1994 Manila Film Festival. Melendez was awarded Best Actress.

=== Planned Maalaala Mo Kaya 20th anniversary film ===
In 2011, it was announced that the program would do another film for its 20th anniversary. The film would have starred Bea Alonzo, Zanjoe Marudo and Angel Locsin, and would have been directed by Laurenti M. Dyogi for Star Cinema. However, for unknown reasons, the film was permanently shelved.

== Radio drama ==
In 2003, MMK started its radio counterpart Maalaala Mo Kaya sa DZMM as a daily radio drama being broadcast on DZMM. It is also hosted by Charo Santos-Concio and airs weekdays from 12:30 PM to 1:00 PM. It was recently recognized as the Best Drama Program at the 32nd Catholic Mass Media Awards. Other awards included Best Radio Drama Program at the 18th KBP Golden Dove Awards 2009, Best Drama Program at the 31st Catholic Mass Media Awards (CMMA) 2009, Best Drama at the 29th Catholic Mass Media Awards (CMMA) 2007, and Best Drama Program at the 16th KBP Golden Dove Awards 2007.

The radio program previously aired on DZMM TeleRadyo, but since it was already pre-recorded, the DZMM station ID was shown instead of a shot of the booth during its air time. Eventually, it was replaced by MMK Klasiks and is only aired on DZMM TeleRadyo.

On October 10, 2016, MMK Klasiks moved to the 1:00 PM timeslot because of the new program Headline Pilipinas, coinciding with DZMM's 30th anniversary. The next year, MMK sa DZMM moved to a later timeslot to make way for the news program. From June 19, 2017 to May 5, 2020, MMK sa DZMM aired every weekdays from 2:00 PM to 2:30 PM only on DZMM Radyo Patrol 630, and MMK Klasiks airs at 9:30 PM to 10:00 PM only on DZMM TeleRadyo.

Upon the relaunch of DZMM on May 29, 2025, the program reverted to the original timeslot from 12:30 PM to 1:00 PM which airs on both DZMM Radyo Patrol 630 and DZMM TeleRadyo.

== Literary adaptations ==
=== Maalaala Mo Kaya Komiks ===
The drama anthology also created a comic book adaptation under Bituin Komiks owned by Mango Comics and Sterling with its initial issue on March 27, 2008. The first comic series was about the life story of Philippine comedian Chokoleit with art direction of Arnel Avetria. It was adapted by Jonas Diego from the teleplay by Maribel G. Ilag. It was illustrated by Mannie Abeleda and Jim Faustino, with tones and letters by Sandy Gonzaga, and edited by Lawrence Mijares.

=== Maalaala Mo Kaya Romance Paperback ===
The drama anthology also has a paperback (pocketbooks) novels under ABS-CBN Publishing. The novels only feature romantic stories.
