= Ama Namin =

Philippine action drama film

- Directed by: Ben Yalung
- Screenplay by: Senen Dimaguila
- Story by: Ernesto C. Rojas
- Produced by: Ernesto C. Rojas; Cirio H. Santiago
- Starring: Christopher de Leon; Sunshine Cruz
- Cinematography: Ricardo Remias
- Edited by: Eduardo Jarlego Jr.
- Music by: Willie Yusi
- Production companies: Premiere Entertainment Productions; Cine Suerte
- Distributed by: Premiere Entertainment Productions
- Release date: April 1, 1998
- Running time: 120 minutes
- Country: Philippines
- Language: Filipino

Ama Namin is a 1998 Philippine action drama film directed by Ben Yalung. The film stars Christopher de Leon and Sunshine Cruz.

== Cast ==
- Christopher de Leon as Fr. Rico / Ka Marco
- Sunshine Cruz as Ka Celia / Ka Lilia
- Chin Chin Gutierrez as Ka Riza
- Mat Ranillo III as Capt. Victor Santos
- Tonton Gutierrez as Lt. Garcia
- Rez Cortez as Capt. Garcia
- Daniel Fernando as Ka Benjie
- Patrick Dela Rosa as Ka Romy
- Pocholo Montes as Ka Elmer
- Maritess Samson as Ka Miguel
- Ray Ventura as Msgr. Reyes
- Robert Ortega as Ka Luis
- Suzette Ranillo as Kadyo's wife
- Edgar Mande as Kadyo
- Diego Castro as Basil
- Tom Olivar as Provincial Commander
- Robert Rivera as Kapitan Celso
- Troy Martino as Sarhento
- Amado Cortez as Don Jose de Dios
- Marita Zobel as Ester de Dios
- Joanne Salazar as Hilda de Dios
- Vincent Borromeo as Jesus Christ
- Joe Towers as Andoy
- Gina Galang as Ka Belen

== Awards ==
Year	Awards	Category	Recipient	Result	Ref.
1999	47th FAMAS Awards	Best Picture	Ama Namin	Nominated	
1999	47th FAMAS Awards	Best Supporting Actress	Chin Chin Gutierrez	Nominated	
