= Relaks Ka Lang, Sagot Kita =

Philippine romantic action film

- Directed by: Danilo P. Cabreira
- Written by: Bibeth Orteza; Danilo P. Cabreira; Buddy Palad; Humilde "Meek" Roxas; Abel Molina; Jojo Lapuz
- Produced by: Grace Victoria F. del Castillo
- Starring: Vilma Santos; Bong Revilla
- Cinematography: Felizardo Bailen; Jun Rasca
- Edited by: Pepe Marcos
- Music by: Mon del Rosario
- Production company: Novastar Films
- Distributed by: Moviestars Production
- Release date: March 1, 1994
- Running time: 100 minutes
- Country: Philippines
- Language: Filipino

Relaks Ka Lang, Sagot Kita is a 1994 Filipino romantic action film co-written and directed by Danilo Cabreira. The film stars Vilma Santos and Ramon "Bong" Revilla Jr.

== Plot ==
Lt. Daniel Santiago and his partner Mike Gable were on their way to a raid on a warehouse to meet Major Mateo and bump their car into Atty Vera Villaverde's car and her assistance Lizette. Daniel tries to reason with her, but she refuses and orders Lizette to call the police, but Mike reveals themselves as police and Daniel tells Vera to meet up at the precinct to settle the incident and hurriedly head to the warehouse. They arrive with the raid already started resulting in casualties among Mateo's police force and the smugglers led by Warlito Gan. Daniel and Mike enter the warehouse killing the remaining smugglers and arrest Warlito.

After the raid, Vera arrives at the precinct informing Mateo what Daniel did to her car and he agreed to pay the damage and congratulate the latter. Meanwhile, Victor Gan plans to have Warlito release him by planting false documents on the Department of Justice. Later Mike brings Daniel to his house to prepare to fix Vera's car, but an assailant attacks him, damaging his pedant in the process as he killed the assailant. This also delayed the repairing of Vera's car and Lizette informs her about it. Vera then finds her car fixed and Daniel hands her keys for the car. Later in the court Warlito was triad and sentence to prison for his crimes and he tells Daniel that they will see each other again.

After a failed attempt to kill Daniel, Victor plans to kill Mike in order to frame it on Daniel. Sgt. Masungcal who was working with Warlito and Victor find Mike and his friend Bobet in an old building. He forces Mike to call Daniel at gunpoint and ordering to meet him in the warehouse. Masungcal then kills Mike to the horror of Bobet who was then taken away and attempts to kill him to prevent to clear Daniel's name, but the latter manages to get away with only a minor wound and goes into hiding. Meanwhile, Daniel arrives and finds Mike's body and examine the gun which Masungcal killed him and notices some cases on drugs. But before he could find out, Masungcal and his police force appear and falsely arrest and frame him for Mike's murder. Mateo was ultimately deceived and furiously confronts Daniel for killing his own partner despite he did not and there was a witness, but he refuses to believe it. The incident also reach to Daniel's family, but his father, brother and sister did not believe it, but Jovita his mother believes it.

With Daniel being framed for Mike's death, he was sent to trial and Vera was hired by Victor to secure the release of Warlito to continue his illegal activities. After Daniel was ready to send to prison, he was able to escape and have Vera as his hostage on her car resulting a car chase and damaging her car again in the process. Daniel was able to escape the deceived police and Masungcal into South Expressway. Mateo learned of his escape and plan to put a wanted poster on him.

Meanwhile, Daniel and Vera stop at a gas station for rest stop, Vera attempts to escape, but is discovered and continue their way and spent the night in a hotel and Daniel informs her that he did not killed Mike and Bobet saw what really happened. The next day Daniel and Vera continue their journey to Daniel's family, but her car overheats and stops in the auto parts shop in Tagaytay. While the car is being repaired, Daniel and Vera go into the nearby restaurant for something to eat. While Vera is in the restroom, Masungcal and his police force unexpectedly arrive and wound Daniel demanding where Vera is and he lies to him that she escaped her. Vera sees Masungcal punches Daniel in a fit of rage and unknowingly reveals to her that he was the one who killed Mike, so Warlito could be released from prison to continue his smuggling schemes. Vera escapes back to the auto parts through the back of the restaurant and the mechanic informs her that her car is fixed and asked what is that gunshot and she replies that she need her car to save him. Vera attempts to leave on her car, but stops, now realizing that she has been double crossed. She hesitates for a while and lets a raging cry and sets her car in reverse to stop Masungcal as he and his police furiously drag Daniel to their car to bring him back to Metro Manila, they notice her coming. Vera rams her car on the traitors' cars furtherly damaging her car in the process. Daniel quickly hops on and they drive off with Masungcal and his men give chase resulting a car shootout chase resulting destroying a portion of Masungcal's police force and stranding Masungcal and his remnants of police force on his crippled car.

Night passed and thunderstorm surges, Vera's car broke down due to the damage it sustained, forcing her and a wounded Daniel continue on foot. The next day with the thunderstorm clear Vera finds farmers and asks them for help tend Daniel. They bring them to Daniel's family where Daniel was greeted by his father, brother and sister, but his mother having fallen to Masungcal's deception and orders him to leave and no longer her son. A shocked Vera informs her that he was framed and is scolded by her husband. Meanwhile, Warlito is released from prison and is picked up by Victor and learn Daniel's case is reopened. Vera and Daniel spent a good time at the farm. Later Vera was back at her home and is contacted by Bobet having come out of hiding informing her that Daniel is not responsible for Mike's death. Bobet meets up with Daniel and Vera informing that Masungcal is the real killer of Mike and gives him protection for the Department of Justice. Later Daniel stays in an old building while Vera goes to Mateo informing the truth to him. One of Masungcal's men Tommy calls Warlito and tells him that he found Daniel at the old building.

Daniel then gets into an argument with Vera as Warlito. his men, Masungcal and his remaining police force arrive, resulting in a shootout throughout the building as Mateo having learned from Bobet of Magsuncal's betrayal and deception that he was the one who killed Mike arrives to Daniel's aid. The battle progresses resulting in the death of Masungcal and Mateo getting injured, Daniel and Warlito get into a fistfight resulting in Warlito getting killed by the former. As Mateo and his men arrest the remainder of Warlito and Masungcal's men, Vera shares a kissed with Daniel. With Daniel's name cleared, Vera spends time with Daniel at his home.

== Cast ==
- Vilma Santos as Atty. Vera Villaverde
- Ramon "Bong" Revilla Jr. as Daniel Santiago
- Anthony Alonzo as Warlito Gan
- Mat Ranillo III as Vera's suitor
- Tommy Abuel as defense lawyer
- Vic Vargas as Maj. Mateo
- Subas Herrero as Victor Gan
- Ruby Rodriguez as Lizette
- Edgar Mande as Mike Gable
- Perla Bautista as Aling Jovita
- Jane Zaleta as Daniel's sister
- King Gutierrez as Masungcal
- Edwin Reyes as Raul
- Manjo del Mundo as Gutierrez
- Tom Olivar as Tommy
- Oliver Osorio as Bobet
- Harold Zaleta as Daniel's brother
- Nanding Fernandez as Presiding Justice
- Vic Varrion as Brgy. Captain
- Romeo Enriquez as Romy
- Alma Lerma as Vera's aunt

== Awards ==
Year	Awards	Category	Recipient	Result	Ref.
1995	44th FAMAS Awards	Best Actor	Bong Revilla	Won	
1995	44th FAMAS Awards	Best Child Actress	Jane Zaleta	Nominated	
