= Simon Ibarra =

Filipino actor (born 1968)

- Born: Rogelio Matira; January 24, 1968 (age 58); Mabini, Batangas, Philippines
- Other names: Rogelio, Roger, Mon
- Occupations: Actor, comedian and producer
- Years active: 1998–present
- Notable work: Starla; Ang sa Iyo ay Akin; Mars Ravelo's Darna
- Height: 1.71 m (5 ft 7 in)
- Children: 3

Rogelio Matira (born January 24, 1968), better known by his stage name Simon Ibarra, is a Filipino actor and comedian. He is well known for playing compelling antagonists, such as the ruthless Caesar Augusto in the hit series Ang sa Iyo ay Akin (2020) and the corrupt Mayor Zaldy Vallesteros / Mr. X in Mars Ravelo's Darna (2022). He has also been a staple guest in long-running anthology shows like Magpakailanman and Maalaala Mo Kaya.

== Early life and education ==
Ibarra was born and raised in the coastal municipality of Mabini, Batangas, Philippines. He moved to Manila for his tertiary education, where he studied and completed a degree in Civil Engineering at the University of the East (UE). Before transitioning into acting, he used his educational background to work as a civil engineer. He also briefly worked as a bartender before entering the entertainment industry in the late 1990s.

== Career ==
Ibarra appeared in movies like Masarap ang Unang Kagat (1998) with Karla Estrada and Sabrina M., Soltera (1999) starring Maricel Soriano, Live Show (2000) with Ana Capri and Klaudia Koronel, and Madame X (2000) starring Ina Raymundo.

He also appeared on ABS-CBN TV series Tayong Dalawa (2009) with Gerald Anderson and Jake Cuenca, and My Binondo Girl (2011) topbilled by Kim Chiu. He was also included in the cast of TV5's Babaeng Hampaslupa (2011) starring Susan Roces, Alice Dixson and Alex Gonzaga. He played a special role in Maria Mercedes (2013) starring Jessy Mendiola, and Ikaw Lamang (2014) topbilled by Coco Martin.

He played the role of Kapitan Domeng Jacinto (2019) in Starla and as the main antagonist, Caesar Augusto, of Ang sa Iyo ay Akin (2020).

Ibarra also did Indie movies like Kadin (2007), Tirador (2007), 100 (2008), Bakal Boys (2009), Si Baning, Si Maymay, At Ang Asong Si Bobo (2009), Ligo na Ü, Lapit na Me (2011), Cuchera (2011), Culion (2019).

Ibarra received the Gawad Urian Award Best Supporting Actor nomination for his performance in Live Show (2000).

== Personal life ==
Ibarra is a father of three children. In the mid-2000s, at the height of his early popularity, he made the deliberate decision to temporarily quit the Philippine movie industry and relocate to Canada.

== Filmography ==
=== Film ===
| Year | Title | Role |
|---|---|---|
| TBA | Graduation Day † | |
| 2023 | Sapul | Philip Mijares |
| 2020 | Suarez: The Healing Priest | Ilin Kapitan |
| 2020 | U-Turn | Chief Agustin |
| 2019 | Culion | Dr. Cuevas |
| 2019 | Miracle in Cell No. 7 | Chief |
| 2019 | Man & Wife | Chief of Police |
| 2004 | inter.m@tes | Dode "Boxers" Arceo |
| 2002 | Biyahera | |
| 2002 | Biglang Liko | |
| 2001 | Minsan May Isang Puso | Celso |
| 2000 | Arayyy! | |
| 2000 | Madame X | |
| 2000 | Live Show | Vio |
| 1999 | Sa Paraiso ni Efren | |
| 1999 | Favorite Subject: Sex Education | |
| 1999 | Apoy sa Magdamag | |
| 1998 | Masarap ang Unang Kagat | |
| 1998 | Campus Scandal | Allen |
| 1998 | Dama De Noche | |
| 1998 | Sa Muling Pagpatak ng Hamog | Nelson |
| 1998 | Kung Liligaya Ka Sa Piling Ng Iba | |

- Boy Golden: Shoot to Kill, the Arturo Porcuna Story (2013)
- Gabriel: Ito Ang Kwento Ko (2013)
- The Healing (film) (2012)
- Bola (2012)
- Ligo na Ü, Lapit na Me (2011)
- Cuchera (2011)
- Dampi (2010)
- Vox Populi (2010)
- Fling (2010)
- Ben & Sam (2010)
- Si Baning, Si Maymay, At Ang Asong Si Bobo (2009)
- Bakal Boys (2009)
- Binyag (2008)
- Project X (2008)
- 100 (2008)
- Bahay Kubo: A Pinoy Mano Po! (2007)
- The Inmate (2007)
- Drumbeat (2007)
- Slingshot (2007)
- Siquijor: Mystic Island (2007)
- Heremias: Unang Aklat - Ang Alamat Ng Prinsesang Bayawak (2006)
- Donsol (2006)
- Rotonda (2006)
- Inter.m@tes (2004)

=== Television ===
| Year | Title | Role |
|---|---|---|
| 2026 | Magpakailanman: Pasan ko, Kapatid ko | Lando |
| 2026 | Barangay Love Stories: Dahil sa'yo | Atoy's dad |
| 2026 | Magpakailanman: Ang Laban at Bawi ni Sugar Mercado | Rudy Mercado |
| 2026 | The Master Cutter | Noel |
| 2026 | Family Feud | Himself – Contestant |
| 2026 | Magpakailanman: Ang Babae sa Larawan | Ronnie |
| 2026 | My Husband is a Mafia Boss | Eiji Ferrer |
| 2025–2026 | FPJ's Batang Quiapo | Commissioner Ignacio Medina |
| 2025 | Sins of the Father | Congressman Abel Monteribano |
| 2025 | Maalaala Mo Kaya: Makeup | |
| 2025 | Slay | Roldan Alvarez |
| 2023–2024 | Black Rider | Hernando "Hernan" Bartolome |
| 2023–2024 | Nag-aapoy na Damdamin | Santiago Quijada |
| 2023 | Love Before Sunrise | Robin Ramos |
| 2023 | Magpakailanman: The Lost Boy | Benjie |
| 2023 | Pepito Manaloto: Tuloy Ang Kwento | Lando |
| 2022–2024; 2025–present | ASAP XP | Himself – performer / host |
| 2022-2023 | Mars Ravelo's Darna | Zaldy Vallesteros / Mr. X |
| 2022 | Tadhana: Baliw na Puso | Benok |
| 2021 | Maalaala Mo Kaya: Scarf | Juan |
| 2021 | FPJ's Ang Probinsyano | Enrique Vera |
| 2020-2021 | Ang sa Iyo ay Akin | Caesar Augusto |
| 2020 | A Soldier's Heart | |
| 2019 | The Haunted | Caloy Delgado |
| 2019 | Maalaala Mo Kaya: Salamin | Jo |
| 2019 | Starla | Domingo "Domeng" Jacinto |
| 2019 | Maalaala Mo Kaya: Lipstick | Rico |
| 2018 | Ipaglaban Mo: Kakampi | Frank |
| 2018 | Maalaala Mo Kaya: Saranggola | Jun |
| 2018 | Precious Hearts Romances Presents: Araw Gabi | Armando Olvidar |
| 2018 | Wansapanataym: Gelli In A Bottle | Kanor |
| 2018 | Sana Dalawa ang Puso | |
| 2017 | Wish Ko Lang: Basahan | Domeng |
| 2017 | FPJ's Ang Probinsyano | Young Adult Emilio Syquia |
| 2016-2017 | Doble Kara | SPO1 Leandro Arellano |
| 2016 | Maalaala Mo Kaya | Bong |
| 2016 | My Super D | Fredo |
| 2015 | Nathaniel | Tomas Casillas |
| 2015 | Oh My G! | Martin Reyes |
| 2014 | Maalaala Mo Kaya: Bus | Carlos |
| 2014 | Hawak Kamay | Francis |
| 2014 | Ikaw Lamang | Romeo Dela Cruz |
| 2013 | Maria Mercedes | Cordelio Capili |
| 2013 | Jim Fernandez's Galema: Anak ni Zuma | Pepito Villalobos |
| 2013 | Bukas na Lang Kita Mamahalin | Tomas |
| 2013 | Prinsesa ng Buhay Ko | |
| 2013 | Bayan Ko | Chief of Police |
| 2013 | Maalaala Mo Kaya: Altar | Freddie |
| 2013 | Princess and I | Nagaiel |
| 2012 | Wansapanataym: Trick or Trixie | Sgt. Anselmo Capili |
| 2012 | Maalaala Mo Kaya: Korona | Poldo |
| 2012 | Precious Hearts Romances Presents: Pintada | Gardo |
| 2012 | Point of Entry | Miguel Rodriguez |
| 2012 | Maalaala Mo Kaya: Polo Shirt | Ian |
| 2012 | Legacy | Chief Abono |
| 2012 | Wako Wako | Lando Martinez |
| 2012 | Wansapanataym: Water Willy | Ronnie |
| 2011 | My Binondo Girl | Arturo Dimalanta |
| 2011 | Reputasyon | Itoy Mangubat |
| 2011 | Guns and Roses | Young Badong |
| 2011 | Green Rose | Ruben Torillo |
| 2011 | Maalaala Mo Kaya: Cupcake | Dindo |
| 2011 | Pablo S. Gomez's Mutya | Perya Owner |
| 2010 | Your Song Presents: Kim - Sa Kandungan Mo | Mr. Pinaglabanan |
| 2010 | Star Confessions: Blind Item: The Carmelito 'Shalala' Reyes Confession | Carmelito's brother |
| 2010 | Kokey @ Ako | Jerry |
| 2010 | Precious Hearts Romances Presents: Midnight Phantom | Simon |
| 2010 | Maalaala Mo Kaya: Makinilya | Chino Roces |
| 2009 | Tayong Dalawa | Manuel Bartolome De Castro |
| 2009 | Obra | |
| 2008 | Lobo | Father Ben |
| 2007 | Komiks Presents: Pedro Penduko at ang mga Engkantao | |
| 2007 | Mga Kuwento ni Lola Basyang: Ang Binibining Tumalo Sa Hari | Lamukoy |
| 2006 | Maalaala Mo Kaya: Radyo | Buboy |
| 2005 | Etheria: Ang Ikalimang Kaharian ng Encantadia | Arde |
| 2003 | Gilbert Escoto | |
| 2004 | Hiram | Paul |
| 2001-2003 | Sa Puso Ko Iingatan Ka | Neil |
| 1999 | Sa Sandaling Kailangan Mo Ako | Simon |

=== Microdrama ===
| Year | Title | Role |
|---|---|---|
| 2026 | Romance of the Sea | Tony |

== Accolades ==
| Award | Year | Category | Nominated work | Result | Ref. |
|---|---|---|---|---|---|
| Gawad Urian Awards | 2002 | Best Supporting Actor | Live Show | Nominated | |
