= Tom Olivar =

Filipino actor (born 1958)

- Born: August 21, 1958 (age 68); Philippines
- Occupations: Film and TV actor
- Years active: 1982–present

Known by his stage name Tom Olivar (born August 21, 1958), is a film and television actor in the Philippines.

== Career ==
He is one of the active character actors in Philippine films and TV series since the 1980s.

He appeared in the classic film Bulaklak sa City Jail (1984) with a star-studded cast: Nora Aunor, Gina Alajar, Celia Rodriguez, Perla Bautista, Gloria Romero, and Ricky Davao, among others. He garnered a Best Supporting Actor award from the 1984 Metro Manila Film Festival for the film.

He was cast in several ABS-CBN and GMA-7 teleseryes and melodramas.

One of his memorable appearances was in ABS-CBN's Maalaala Mo Kaya episode "Hair Clip", which aired on March 2, 2013, starring Maricar Reyes, Belle Mariano and Elizabeth Oropesa.

He appeared in more than 70 movies and television shows.

Olivar played villains in the action films Gawa Na ang Bala Na Papatay sa Iyo (1988), Markang Bungo: The Bobby Ortega Story (1991), Alyas Pogi 2 (1991), Gobernador (1992), Manong Gang (1992), Hanggang May Buhay (1992), Sala sa Init, Sala sa Lamig (1993), Ako ang Katarungan: The Lt. Napoleon Guevarra Story (1993), Mancao (1994), Iligpit Na Natin si Bobby Ortega: Markang Bungo 2 (1995), Batas Ko ang Katapat Mo! (1995), Ang Titser Kong Pogi (1995), Kung Marunong Kang Magdasal, Umpisahan Mo Na! (1996), Minsan Ko Lang Sasabihin (2000), Kilabot at Kembot (2002), and Walang Iwanan, Peksman (2002).

Olivar also played villains in the teleseryes Sana Bukas Pa ang Kahapon (2014), FPJ's Ang Probinsyano (2016), The Better Half (2017), La Luna Sangre (2017) and The Promise of Forever (2017).

== Filmography ==
=== Film ===
Year	Title	Role	Note(s)	Ref(s).
1984	Bulaklak sa City Jail	Paquito		
1985	Escort Girls			
1985	Ulo ng Gang-Ho			
1985	The Moises Padilla Story: The Missing Chapter			
1986	Napakasakit, Kuya Eddie			
1986	Kapitan Pablo (Cavite's Killing Field)			
1986	Super Islaw and the Flying Kids	Hostage taker		
1986	Gabi Na, Kumander	Tomas		
1988	Anak ng Cabron			
1988	Urban Terrorist			
1988	Gawa Na ang Bala Na Papatay sa Iyo			
1988	Sa Likod ng Kasalanan			
1989	Carnap King? (The Randy Padilla Story)			
1990	Sa Diyos Lang Ako Susuko			
1990	Lumaban Ka Sagot Kita sa Diyos			
1991	Capt. Jaylo: Batas sa Batas			
1991	Manong Gang			
1992	Pangako sa 'Yo			
1992	Alyas Pogi 2	Don Pepe's henchman		
1992	Hanggang May Buhay			
1993	Sala sa Init, Sala sa Lamig			
1993	Lt. Napoleon Guevarra: Ako ang Katarungan			
1994	Relax Ka Lang, Sagot Kita	Tommy		
1994	Walang Matigas Na Pulis sa Matinik Na Misis			
1995	Costales			
1995	Iligpit na Natin si Bobby Ortega: Markang Bungo 2			
1996	Kristo	Tadeo		
1996	SPO4 Santiago: Sharpshooter	Santiago's group member		
1996	Pag-ibig Ko sa Yo'y Totoo			
1996	Kung Marunong Kang Magdasal Umpisahan Mo Na!			
1997	Ang Probinsyano	Alex's goon		
1998	Ama Namin	Provincial Commander		
1998	Curacha: Ang Babaeng Walang Pahinga			
1999	Higit Pa sa Buhay Ko			
2000	Mapagbigay			
2000	Minsan Ko Lang Sasabihin			
2001	Mila	Torres		
2001	The Life of Rosa			
2002	Kilabot at Kembot			
2002	Mama San			
2002	Mano Po			
2003	Lastikman			
2004	Sabel			
2004	Aishite Imasu (Mahal Kita) 1941			
2006	Zsazsa Zaturnnah Ze Moveeh			
2006	Shake, Rattle & Roll 8			
2007	Happy Hearts			
2007	Tiyanaks	Mang Gaston		
2009	Bala Bala: Maniwala Ka			
2010	Layang Bilanggo			
2018	Jack Em Popoy: The Puliscredibles			
2022	Security Academy			
2022	Mamasapano: Now It Can Be Told			
2023	Tricycle Driver, Kasangga Mo			

=== Television ===
- Agila (1987-1992)
- Ikaw Lang ang Mamahalin (2001-2002)
- Marimar (2007)
- Daisy Siete (TV series) (2008)
- May Bukas Pa (2009)
- Magkano ang Iyong Dangal? (2010)
- Noah (2010-2011)
- Maalaala Mo Kaya - "Itak" (2011)
- I Heart You, Pare! (2011)
- Nasaan Ka Elisa? (2011-2012)
- Spooky Nights (2011-2012)
- Maria la del Barrio (2012)
- Legacy (2012)
- Walang Hanggan (2012)
- Maalaala Mo Kaya - "Belo" (2012)
- Maalaala Mo Kaya - "Gong" (2012)
- Maalaala Mo Kaya - "Hair Clip II" (2013)
- Pangako sa 'Yo (2015)
- Magpahanggang Wakas (2016)
- FPJ's Ang Probinsyano (2016)
- Alyas Robin Hood (2017)
- Kapag Nahati ang Puso (2018)
- The Iron Heart (2022)
- Black Rider (2023)
- Asawa ng Asawa Ko (2024)
- My Father's Wife(2025)
