= Rez Cortez =

Filipino actor and assistant director

President and CEO of the Movie Workers Welfare Foundation
- In office April 2020 – present
- Chairman: Boots Anson-Roa

Personal details
- Born: Res Septimo Cortez; January 4, 1956 (age 70) Canaman, Camarines Sur, Philippines
- Spouse: Candy Cortez
- Children: 4 children including Cai Cortez
- Education: University of the East
- Occupation: Actor; Assistant Director; Former President of Actors Guild of the Philippines
- Years active: 1974 - present

Res Septimo Cortez (born January 4, 1956), better known as Rez Cortez, is a Filipino film and television actor and assistant director.

== Acting career ==
Cortez's film career began in 1974, when he was introduced in Daigdig ng Sindak at Lagim.

He is also known for being an action star in many action films with his intensive and antagonistic roles and also in TV series.

He became an assistant director of the film Kapag Lumaban ang Api in 1987.

He became the president of the Mowelfund (Movie Workers Foundation, Inc.) after Boots Anson-Roa retired on April 1, 2020. He was a former president of the Actors’ Guild of the Philippines and was replaced by Imelda Papin in 2017.

== Politics ==
In 1986, Cortez campaigned for the reelection of president Ferdinand Marcos in the 1986 snap election.

Cortez also ran as a representative of Camarines Sur in 2013 but did not win the seat.

== Personal life ==
On August 31, 2021, Cortez's daughter Cai posted on Instagram that he will undergo surgery for a suspected liver cancer. On September 17, 2021, his daughter announced that he is cancer-free after a successful surgery.

== Filmography ==
=== Film ===
Year	Title	Role
1974	Daigdig ng Sindak at Lagim	
1974	Pssst... Halika, Babae!	
1975	Bamboo Trap	
1976	Insiang	Bebot
1977	Sila... Sa Bawa't Bangketa	
1977	The Captive Virgins	David
1978	Mga Mata ni Anghelita	Truck Driver
1980	Angela Markado	
1981	Sierra Madre	
1984	Dapat Ka Bang Mahalin?	Phil
1984	This Is My Country	Boy Echas
1984	Lovingly Yours, Helen (The Movie)	Alex
1984	Anak ni Waray vs. Anak ni Biday	Charlie
1984	Charot	
1984	Ang Padrino	Jake
1985	Anak ng Tondo	Johnny
1986	Laban Kung Laban	Cebu Town Mayor
1986	Sana'y Wala Nang Wakas	Louie
1986	Batang Quiapo	Tikboy
1986	Captain Barbell	Atong
1986	Kapitan Pablo: Cavite Killing Fields	Berting
1987	Jack en Poy, Hale-Hale Hoy!	Anton
1987	Jack & Jill	Baldo / Betty
1988	Wake Up Little Susie	Hermogenes Macatayog
1988	Kapag Napagod ang Puso	
1988	Chinatown: Sa Kuko ng Dragon	
1989	Abot Hanggang Sukdulan	Rocky
1989	Handa Na ang Hukay Mo, Calida	Sgt. Delgado
1989	Jones Bridge Massacre (Task Force Clabio)	Capt. Wenceslao Ealdama
1989	Isang Bala, Isang Buhay	Ex-Commando
1990	Alyas Pogi: Birador ng Nueva Ecija	Alex
1990	Shake, Rattle & Roll II	Tanda
1990	Hukom .45	Mike Pablo
1991	Maging Sino Ka Man	Alex
1991	Kapitan Jaylo: Batas sa Batas	Kid
1991	Buddy en Sol (Sine Ito)	
1991	Contreras Gang	Tony
1992	Eh, Kasi Bata	
1992	Narito ang Puso Ko	
1993	Hulihin: Probinsyanong Mandurukot	Carnapper
1993	Patapon	Police sergeant
1993	Ronquillo: Tubong Cavite, Laking Tondo	Paolo
1993	Deo Dador: Berdugo ng Munti	Caloy
1994	Mistah	
1994	Ang Pagbabalik ni Pedro Penduko	Silahis
1995	Isang Kahig, Tatlong Tuka	
1995	The Grepor Butch Belgica Story	Val
1995	Ikaw Pa... Eh Love Kita!	Noel Agustin
1995	Matimbang Pa sa Dugo	Totoy Icepick
1996	Kristo	Judas Iscariote
1996	Hindi Ako Ander, Tanong Mo Kay Kumander!	Fred
1996	Bossing	Waldo de Guzman
1997	Hawak Ko Buhay Mo	Chief
1998	Guevarra: Sa Batas Ko, Walang Hari	Alex
1998	Ama Namin	Capt. Garcia
1998	Warfreak	Edison Yu
1999	D' Sisters: Nuns of the Above	Dennis
1999	Tigasin	Roxas
2001	Mano Mano 2	Tata Delfin
2001	Weyt a Minit, Kapeng Mainit!	Col. Valentino
2003	Woman of Breakwater	Foreman
2005	The Great Raid	
2009	OMG (Oh, My Girl!)	Gay friend
2011	Shake, Rattle & Roll 13	Ranchero
2012	Bwakaw	Sol
2012	Si Agimat, si Enteng Kabisote at si Ako	Rez
2013	Alfredo S. Lim (The Untold Story)	Calderon
2013	The Search for Weng Weng	Interviewee
2014	Where I Am King	Boyong
2014	Gangster Lolo	
2014	Tres	
2014	Feng Shui 2	Robert Anonuevo
2015	The Last Pinoy Action King	Himself
2015	Maria Labo	Kapitan 1
2016	Lumayo Ka Nga sa Akin	Bos
2016	Working Beks	Gusting
2018	Never Not Love You	Joanne's father
2018	Ang Misyon: A Marawi Siege Story	
2021	Tililing	Peter's father
2022	Partners in Crime	Don Bill Libme
2023	Mang Kanor	Mang Kanor
2023	Sa Kamay ng Diyos	
2023	Imelda Papin: The Untold Story	Atty. Vicente Millora
2025	First Light	Edward
2025	Kontrabida Academy	Facial Expression Teacher

=== Television ===
Year	Title	Role
1987	Balintataw	
1993	Ipaglaban Mo!	
1996–1999	Tierra Sangre	Juancho Sangre
1997	Esperanza	Delfin Montejo
2001–2002	Ikaw Lang ang Mamahalin	Father Basil
2005–2006	Mga Anghel na Walang Langit	Batista
2006–2007	Captain Barbell	Officer Joe Salvation
2007	Lupin	Lt. Milyones
2007	Fantastic Man	Boss Elvis
2008	Joaquin Bordado	Chief Mendoza
2008–2009	Eva Fonda	Osang's father
2011	Time of My Life	Douglas
2011–2012	Regal Shocker: Pelikula (Part 2)	Director
2012	Valiente	Pepito "Peping" Ramirez
2012	Kapitan Awesome	Don Sebastian
2012	Faithfully	Fidel Mariano-Saavedra
2012	Temptation of Wife	Abner Santos
2013	Kakambal ni Eliana	Prof. Banal
2013	Villa Quintana	Alfonso Mendiola
2014	My BFF	Jessie Catacutan
2014	Dream Dad	Enrique Sta. Maria
2015	Mac and Chiz	Tito Butch
2015	Kapamilya, Deal or No Deal	Briefcase #16
2015	Beautiful Strangers	Mike Mamaril
2016	That's My Amboy	Jun
2016	Magkaibang Mundo	Jonathan "Jojo" Perez
2016–2017	FPJ's Ang Probinsyano	PC/Supt. Rogelio Jacob
2017	I Heart Davao	Jerry Bernade
2017	Kambal, Karibal	Father Roman
2018–2019	Ika-5 Utos	Dado Vallejo
2019	Dahil sa Pag-ibig	Pablo "Pabs" Sandoval
2019	One of the Baes	Rolando Ortiz
2021	Owe My Love	General
2021	Init sa Magdamag	Senator Victor Ruiz
2022	Suntok sa Buwan	Magnus / Migs
2023	FPJ's Batang Quiapo	Abdul
2026	Sigabo	Paquito Machica

== Awards and nominations ==
Year	Award(s)	Critics	Works	Result
2013	31st Luna Awards	Best Supporting Actor	Bwakaw	Nominated
