= 2013 Philippine House of Representatives elections in the Bicol Region =

Elections were held in the Bicol Region for seats in the House of Representatives of the Philippines on May 13, 2013.

The candidate with the most votes won that district's seat for the 16th Congress of the Philippines.

== Summary ==
Party	Popular vote	%	Swing	Seats won	Change
Liberal				6	
Lakas				4	
NPC				3	
NUP				2	
Nacionalista				1	
LDP				0	
PDP–Laban				0	
PMP				0	
UNA				0	
Independent				0	
Valid votes				16	
Invalid votes					
Turnout					
Registered voters					

== Albay ==
=== 1st District ===
Incumbent Edcel Lagman (independent) is term limited; his son former Quezon City councilor Edcel Greco Lagman is running under Liberal Party.

2013 Philippine House of Representatives election at Albay's 1st district
Party	Candidate	Votes	%
Liberal	Edcel Greco Lagman	57,133	42.01
UNA	Ricky Ziga	55,011	40.45
PDP–Laban	Gregorio Luis Contacto	13,111	9.64
Margin of victory		2,122	1.56%
Invalid or blank votes		10,759	7.91
Total votes		136,014	100.00
Liberal gain from Independent			

=== 2nd District ===
Al Francis Bichara is the incumbent.

2013 Philippine House of Representatives election at Albay's 2nd district
Party	Candidate	Votes	%
Nacionalista	Al Francis Bichara	133,333	69.75
Independent	Walter Magdato	13,133	6.87
Margin of victory		120,200	62.88%
Invalid or blank votes		44,681	23.38
Total votes		191,147	100.00
Nacionalista hold			

=== 3rd District ===
Fernando Gonzalez is the incumbent.

2013 Philippine House of Representatives election at Albay's 3rd district
Party	Candidate	Votes	%
Liberal	Fernando Gonzalez	101,270	64.36
Independent	Dante Arandia	40,634	25.82
Margin of victory		60,636	38.54%
Invalid or blank votes		15,449	9.82
Total votes		157,353	100.00
Liberal hold			

== Camarines Norte ==
=== 1st District ===
Incumbent Renato Unico, Jr. is running for governor. Catherine Reyes is his party's nominee.

2013 Philippine House of Representatives election at Camarines Norte's 1st district
Party	Candidate	Votes	%
NUP	Catherine Barcelona-Reyes	49,095	47.40
Liberal	Winifrido Oco	43,290	41.80
Margin of victory		5,805	5.60%
Invalid or blank votes		11,185	10.80
Total votes		103,570	100.00
NUP hold			

=== 2nd District ===
Elmer Panotes is the incumbent.

2013 Philippine House of Representatives election at Camarines Norte's 2nd district
Party	Candidate	Votes	%
Lakas	Elmer Panotes	53,700	52.12
Liberal	Liwayway Vinzons-Chato	31,197	30.28
Independent	Ruth Herrera	7,485	7.26
Margin of victory		22,503	21.84%
Invalid or blank votes		10,649	10.34
Total votes		103,031	100.00
Lakas hold			

== Camarines Sur ==
=== 1st District ===
Rolando Andaya is the incumbent.

2013 Philippine House of Representatives election at Camarines Sur's 1st district
Party	Candidate	Votes	%
Lakas	Rolando Andaya, Jr.	53,986	73.89
Nacionalista	Nestor de los Reyes	5,681	7.78
Margin of victory		48,305	66.12%
Invalid or blank votes		13,391	18.33
Total votes		73,058	100.00
Lakas hold			

=== 2nd District ===
Dato Arroyo is the incumbent and he will face outgoing Governor Luis Raymond Villafuerte.

2013 Philippine House of Representatives election at Camarines Sur's 2nd district
Party	Candidate	Votes	%
Lakas	Dato Arroyo	57,106	47.85
Nacionalista	LRay Villafuerte	49,436	41.43
Liberal	Sabas Mabulo	6,380	5.35
Margin of victory		7,670	6.43%
Invalid or blank votes		6,415	5.38
Total votes		119,337	100.00
Lakas hold			

=== 3rd District ===
Incumbent Luis Villafuerte is term limited; he will run for the governorship. His wife, Monetary Board member Nelly is his party's nominee. Late Secretary of the Interior and Local Government Jesse Robredo's widow Leni is her primary opponent.

2013 Philippine House of Representatives election at Camarines Sur's 3rd district
Party	Candidate	Votes	%
Liberal	Leni Robredo	123,843	69.93
NPC	Nelly Villafuerte	35,160	19.85
Independent	Charina Fausto	2,296	1.30
PDP–Laban	Oscar Arcilla, Jr.	640	0.36
Margin of victory		88,683	50.08
Invalid or blank votes		15,155	8.56
Total votes		177,094	100.00
Liberal gain from NPC			

=== 4th District ===
Incumbent Arnulfo Fuentebella is term limited; his son former congressman Felix William is his party's nominee. His opponent is actor Aga Muhlach, of the Liberal Party.

In November 2012, Muhlach's candidacy was in jeopardy when a Camarines Sur Municipal Trial Court (MTC) ordered his name to be stricken off the voters' list as it ruled that he had not complied with residency requirements. Muhlach appealed the decision. A month later, the Camarines Sur Regional Trial Court (RTC) in San Jose upheld the MTC decision, allowing the removal of Muhlach from the voters' list. However, the Philippine Court of Appeals issued a restraining order in January 2013 preventing the RTC from executing its decision, thereby allowing Muhlach to run.

A week later, the Commission on Elections ruled that Muhlach is a natural-born Filipino citizen and is thus eligible to run. The commission maintained that Muhlach, who had Spanish-born father who was a naturalized Filipino at the time of his birth and a natural-born Filipino mother, didn't renounce his Philippine citizenship when the Spanish government issued him a Spanish passport, and that while Muhlach may be a dual citizen, local laws have no control on laws from other countries, including their citizenship laws. The Court of Appeals ruled on February 13 that the Muhlachs be reinstated in the voters' list, annulling the decision of the MTC and RTC, saying that the couple "have more than sufficiently complied with the residency requirement in law." Less than a month later, the Commission on Elections' Second Division dismissed a petition to dismiss Muhlach's certificate of candidacy due to his lack of residency, removing all obstacles for his candidacy.

2013 Philippine House of Representatives election at Camarines Sur's 4th district
Party	Candidate	Votes	%
NPC	Felix William Fuentebella	82,534	50.68
Liberal	Aga Muhlach	80,309	49.32
Margin of victory		2,225	1.37%
Total votes		162,843	100.00
NPC hold			

=== 5th District ===
Salvio Fortuno is the incumbent. He will be going against former congressman Felix Alfelor, Jr. and actor Rez Cortez.

2013 Philippine House of Representatives election at Camarines Sur's 5th district
Party	Candidate	Votes	%
Liberal	Salvio Fortuno	75,178	51.09
NPC	Felix Alfelor, Jr.	42,295	28.74
UNA	Rez Cortez	13,474	9.16
Margin of victory		32,883	22.35%
Invalid or blank votes		16,210	11.02
Total votes		147,157	100.00
Liberal hold			

== Catanduanes ==
Cesar Sarmiento is the incumbent.

2013 Philippine House of Representatives election at Catanduanes
Party	Candidate	Votes	%
Liberal	Cesar Sarmiento	85,358	73.74
LDP	Leandro Verceles	12,156	10.50
PMP	Restituto de Quiros	1,355	1.17
Margin of victory		73,202	63.24%
Invalid or blank votes		16,892	14.59
Total votes		115,761	100.00
Liberal hold			

== Masbate ==
=== 1st District ===
Incumbent Narciso Bravo, Jr. is term limited; his wife Maria Vida is his party's nominee.

2013 Philippine House of Representatives election at Masbate's 1st district
Party	Candidate	Votes	%
NUP	Maria Vida Bravo	27,201	53.50
Liberal	Ricardo Butalid, Jr.	16,823	33.09
Margin of victory		10,378	20.41%
Invalid or blank votes		6,820	13.41
Total votes		50,844	100.00
NUP hold			

=== 2nd District ===
Incumbent Antonio Kho is running for the governorship; his wife former governor Elisa Olga Kho is his party's nominee.

2013 Philippine House of Representatives election at Masbate's 2nd district
Party	Candidate	Votes	%
Lakas	Elisa Olga Kho	60,592	40.51
NPC	Darius Tuason	42,363	28.32
Margin of victory		18,229	12.19%
Invalid or blank votes		46,619	31.17
Total votes		149,574	100.00
Lakas hold			

=== 3rd District ===
Scott Davies Lanete is the incumbent.

2013 Philippine House of Representatives election at Masbate's 3rd district
Party	Candidate	Votes	%
NPC	Scott Davies Lanete	48,011	40.28
Liberal	Mac John Seachon	42,092	35.32
Independent	Ricardo Yanson	1,963	1.65
Margin of victory		5,919	4.97%
Invalid or blank votes		27,120	22.75
Total votes		119,186	100.00
NPC hold			

== Sorsogon ==
=== 1st District ===
Incumbent Salvador Escudero III died while in office. His widow Evelina is his party's nominee.

2013 Philippine House of Representatives election at Sorsogon's 1st district
Party	Candidate	Votes	%
NPC	Evelina Escudero	55,425	50.34
Independent	Aeneas Eli Diaz	28,006	25.43
Independent	Arnulfo Perete	12,581	11.43
Margin of victory		27,419	24.90%
Invalid or blank votes		14,099	12.80
Total votes		110,111	100.00
NPC hold			

=== 2nd District ===
Deogracias Ramos, Jr. is the incumbent. Independent candidate Jose Solis, congressman until 2010 when he was term limited, died on April 23, 2013. It is unknown if he, as an independent, will have a replacement candidate.

2013 Philippine House of Representatives election at Sorsogon's 2nd district
Party	Candidate	Votes	%
Liberal	Deogracias Ramos, Jr.	79,442	59.07
UNA	Guillermo de Castro	32,121	23.88
PMP	Sappho Gillego	6,346	4.72
Independent	Jose Solis (+)	1,236	0.92
Margin of victory		47,321	35.19%
Invalid or blank votes		15,343	11.41
Total votes		134,488	100.00
Liberal hold			
