= Expressway (film) =

2016 action thriller film by Ato Bautista

- Theatrical release poster
- Directed by: Ato Bautista
- Screenplay by: Shugo Praico
- Story by: Ato Bautista; Shugo Praico
- Produced by: Ato Bautista; Shugo Praico; Jason Orfalas; Richard V. Somes; Alvin Anson; Aljur Abrenica
- Starring: Alvin Anson; Aljur Abrenica; RK Bagatsing; Erick Samonte; Japo Parcero; Jim Libiran; Inez Bernardo; Arpee Bautista
- Cinematography: Gian Vargas Caluag
- Edited by: Benjamin Tolentino
- Music by: Francis de Veyra
- Production companies: Centerstage Productions; Strawdogs Studio Production; Waveslicer Productions
- Distributed by: Solar Entertainment Corporation; Sinag Maynila
- Release dates: April 22, 2016 (Sinag Maynila); October 6, 2016 (Busan)
- Running time: 94 minutes
- Country: Philippines
- Languages: Filipino; English

Expressway is a 2016 Filipino independent action thriller film co-produced and directed by Ato Bautista and co-written by Shugo Praico. Starring Alvin Anson and Aljur Abrenica, the story follows Ben, a hitman on his last job, who is forced to partner with the young and psychotic Morris on the road to his three targets.

The film was first released as an entry to the 2nd Sinag Maynila Film Festival on April 22, 2016, where it won three awards, including Best Actor (Anson). It was later screened at the 21st Busan International Film Festival.

== Plot ==
A hitman named Ben and his young and psychotic partner Morris are sent on a mission to go to the house of Budoy and Kato. When Ben and Morris arrive, they quietly invade Budoy and Kato's house and silently kill Budoy’s wife, thinking this is the best way to die and decide to spare Budoy’s children. As they return to their car, a stubborn Morris returns to the house, alerting the children to wake up, and forces the former and Ben to kill the children. Ben regrets killing the children because of Morris' stubbornness.

The next day, Ben is haunted by his son’s death as he finds out who was responsible for killing his son. Meanwhile, Colonel gives Ben one last job to kill Tatang before he can escape. While on the job, Morris recounts his flashback story of his father teaching him how to use a .38 Caliber revolver. Ben arrives at Tatang's place and reluctantly attempts to kill him, but fails and decides to spare him.

Ben retires as a hitman by leaving his gun in the church. However, Tatang orders Botod and his gang to kill Ben and Morris, forcing them to fight back. Morris manages to kill Botod and save Ben, but blames him for almost getting themselves killed. A stubborn and psychotic Morris steals Ben's car and kills the two people that he crashed into.

At the end of the film, Morris tells another flashback story of how a kid killed a clueless child with his father's gun, revealing himself as the killer of Ben's son in revenge after Ben killed Morris’s father. This forces Ben to kill Morris to avenge his son, however, Morris shoots Ben first. Another gunshot was heard and a car was driven at sunrise. It is unknown who was killed and who was driving.

== Cast ==
- Alvin Anson as Ben
  - RK Bagatsing as young Ben
- Aljur Abrenica as Morris
  - Jahren Estorque as young Morris
- Erick Samonte as Tatang
- Japo Parcero as Princess Red
- Jim Libiran as Botod
- Allan Equalan as Budoy
- Rose Atienza as Budoy's wife
- Kim Atienza as Budoy's son
- Danica Siner as Budoy's daughter
- Inez Bernardo Young Ben’s wife
- Arpee Bautista as Morris’ father
- Kiko Matos as Kato
- Nica Naval as Kato’s Girlfriend
- Nathaniel Rocca as Ben’s son
- Ato Bautista as the voice of Colonel

== Production ==
Actor Alvin Anson first revealed plans for a thriller film called Expressway on September 26, 2015, stating that shooting will start in October.

In January 2016, filmmaker Brillante Mendoza stated that the film was included as an entry to the 2nd Sinag Maynila Film Festival, of which he co-founded with Solar Entertainment Corporation head Wilson Tieng.

== Release ==
Expressway was released on April 22, 2016, in select SM Cinemas as an entry to the 2nd Sinag Maynila Film Festival organized by Solar Entertainment Corporation. Later in October, the film was screened at the 21st Busan International Film Festival.

=== Critical response ===
Elizabeth Kerr of The Hollywood Reporter gave the film a mixed review, stating that the film is "a by-the-numbers noir thriller.... [T]he film could have used a more vivid sense of place. When the inevitable conclusion rolls around, it doesn't pack a wallop so much as a knowing shrug."

== Accolades ==
Group	Category	Name	Result
Sinag Maynila	Best Actor	Alvin Anson	Won
Sinag Maynila	Best Musical Score	Francis de Veyra	Won
Sinag Maynila	Best Editing	Benjamin Tolentino	Won
