= Masikip Na ang Mundo Mo, Labrador =

2001 action film by Baldo Marro

- Directed by: Baldo Marro
- Written by: Baldo Marro
- Produced by: Lily Y. Monteverde
- Starring: Lito Lapid
- Cinematography: Rey de Leon
- Edited by: Joe Solo
- Music by: Nonong Buencamino
- Production company: Regal Entertainment
- Distributed by: Regal Entertainment
- Release date: June 6, 2001
- Running time: 92 minutes
- Country: Philippines
- Language: Filipino

Masikip Na ang Mundo Mo, Labrador is a 2001 Philippine action film written and directed by Baldo Marro. The film stars Lito Lapid in the title role.

The film is streaming online on YouTube.

== Cast ==
- Lito Lapid as Capt. Ramon Labrador
- Isabel Granada as Ligaya
- Ricardo Cepeda as William Dadivas
- Ruel Vernal as Col. Barredo
- John Apacible as Alberto
- Buddy Palad as Mang Simon
- Bryan Gomez as Edwin
- Froilan Sales as Manuel Manzano
- Rando Almanzor as Rustie Lara
- Diding Andres as Aling Sylvia
- Rosanna Magdalena as Rose
- Joanna Gonzales as Remy
- Orestes Ojeda as Maj. Tablante
- Roy Alvarez as Chairman
- Edgar Mande as Gorio
- Alex Bolado as Gold Courier
- Alex Cunanan as Dante Vevano
