= Edgar Mande =

Filipino actor (born 1960)

- Born: May 15, 1960 (age 65)
- Occupation: Actor
- Years active: 1982–2005; 2019
- Spouse: Ramona (m. 2021)

Edgar Mande (born May 15, 1960) is a retired Filipino actor.

== Career ==
Edgar Mande's acting career was managed by Alfie Lorenzo.

In 2018, more than a decade after his retirement from the film industry, Mande agreed to star in Ronnie Ricketts' action film Exit Point, which was released the next year.

== Personal life ==
Edgar Mande married Michelle, a woman from Angeles, Pampanga, in December 1988. Mande later married a fourth time to Ramona Fabie in 2021.

Mande previously lived in Makati, Metro Manila, and is now currently residing in Los Angeles, California.

== Filmography ==
Year	Title	Role	Note(s)	Ref(s).
1982	Schoolgirls			
1982	Galawgaw			
1982	Mother Dear	Jun Herrera		
1982	Boystown			
1983	Kirot			
1983	Angkinin Mo Ako			
1983	Iiyak Ka Rin			
1983	Summer Holiday			
1983	Gabi Kung Sumikat ang Araw			
1983	Hanguin Mo Ako sa Putik			
1984	Uhaw sa Pag-ibig			
1984	Sex Education			
1984	Ligaw Na Bunga			
1984	Daddy's Little Darlings			
1984	Take Home Girls			
1984	Hayop sa Sarap			
1985	Sanay			
1985	Kikirut-kirot			
1985	Public Enemy No. 2: Maraming Number Two			
1987	Cabarlo			
1990	Hukom .45			
1992	Sonny Boy: Public Enemy No. 1 of Cebu City			
1992	Patayin si Billy Zapanta – Order of Battle: Enemy No. 1	Asyong		
1993	Capt. Rassul Alih, Hindi Sayo ang Mindanao			
1993	Ronquillo: Tubong Cavite, Laking Tondo	Jimboy		
1993	Task Force Habagat			
1994	Relax Ka Lang, Sagot Kita	Mike Gable		
1994	Iukit Mo sa Bala	Rayland Velez		
1995	Huwag Mong Isuko ang Laban			
1996	Madaling Mamatay, Mahirap Mabuhay			
1996	Kristo	James the Great		
1996	Hawak Ko Buhay Mo	Matt's policeman		
1997	Boy Buluran			
1998	Laban Ko Ito... Walang Dapat Madamay			
1998	Ama Namin	Kadyo		
2000	Makamandag Na Bala	Jeff		
2000	Akin ang Labang Ito			
2001	Masikip Na ang Mundo Mo, Labrador	Gorio		
2001	Apoy sa Karagatan			
2001	Mano Mano 2: Ubusan ng Lakas	Gonzales		
2001	Amasona: Kumakasa... Pumuputok			
2002	Parola: Bilangguang Walang Rehas	Vicente		
2002	Kilabot at Kembot	Efren		
2004	Animal	Michael	Shot in 1999	
2004	Mano Mano 3: Arnis the Lost Art	Gonzales		
2005	Uno			
2019	Exit Point	Beki Bato		
