= Alfredo S. Lim (The Untold Story) =

2013 biographical action film starring Cesar Montano

Alfredo S. Lim: The Untold Story
- Directed by: Cesar Montano
- Written by: Enrique Ramos; Cesar Montano
- Starring: Cesar Montano; Alessandra de Rossi; Nonie Buencamino; Marc Abaya; Alwyn Uytingco; Alvin Anson; Tirso Cruz III
- Cinematography: Carlo Mendoza
- Edited by: Tara Illenberger
- Music by: Nonong Buencamino
- Production company: CM Films
- Release date: February 27, 2013
- Country: Philippines
- Language: Filipino

Alfredo S. Lim: The Untold Story is a 2013 Filipino biographical action film directed, co-written by, and starring Cesar Montano as the eponymous police general Alfredo Lim. Starring alongside Montano is Alessandra de Rossi, Nonie Buencamino, Marc Abaya, Alwyn Uytingco, Alvin Anson, Tirso Cruz III, Jackie Lou Blanco, Isabel Granada, and Kristel Romero. It is the fourth film to be based on Lim's life as a police officer, after Alfredo Lim: Manila Police (1977), Target... Police General (1989), and Alfredo Lim: Batas ng Maynila (1995).

Lim offered Montano the project, who in turn was inspired to showcase events in Lim's life that have not been tackled yet in his previous biopics. Produced by CM Films, the film was released on February 27, 2013, timed to run before Lim's reelection campaign as Mayor of Manila.

== Cast ==
- Cesar Montano as Alfredo S. Lim
  - Miggs Cuaderno as young Alfredo Lim
- Alessandra de Rossi as Amalia
- Nonie Buencamino as Moises
- Marc Abaya as Charlie
- Alwyn Uytingco as Noli
- Alvin Anson as Roman
- Tirso Cruz III as Zosing
- Jackie Lou Blanco as Nun
- Isabel Granada
- Kristel Romero as Nun 2
- Rez Cortez as Calderon
- Jeffrey Tam as Kanor
- Gene Padilla
- Boy Roque as Samuel
- Kristoffer King as Gemo
- Noel Montano
- Bong Matias as a policeman
- Gloria Romero as Lola Flora
- Spanky Manikan as Lola Nardo
- Gina Pareño as Fred's mother
  - Raquel Pareño as Fred's young mother
- Ara Mina as Mrs. Gameng
- Carlos Morales as Gameng
- Krista Miller as Marita
- Isabella Montano as Nun 3

== Production ==
Cesar Montano was offered the project by Alfredo Lim himself, who favored him as director and actor because of his interest in portraying Lim's childhood while others only took interest in his exploits as a police officer. With the film, Montano sought to showcase parts of Lim's life that have not been tackled yet by the three existing biopics of the police general, taking inspiration from a biography of Lim written by National Artist Nick Joaquin. The film was publicly announced on October 22, 2012, and had the working title Turning Cradle: The Untold Story of Alfredo Lim.

Production began on November 26, 2012, and ended in February 2013. A "Rough Cut" trailer was released on YouTube through Lim's channel on January 30.

== Release ==
The film premiered at SM City Manila on February 26, 2013, and was released nationwide on February 27, timed for an exhibition run before the campaign period of the 2013 Philippine local elections, where Lim is running a reelection campaign for Mayor of Manila. A brief controversy occurred a few weeks before election day (May 13) when Lim handed out a pirated copy of the film to the media for viewing, though his chief of staff Ric de Guzman strongly denied its pirated nature, stating "How can those CDs be pirated when it was the producer himself who gave them to the mayor?"

== See also ==
- Bato: The General Ronald dela Rosa Story, a 2019 film about another Filipino police officer turned Senator, also released before an election's campaign period
