= Ako, Ikaw... Magkaagaw =

Ako, Ikaw...Magkaagaw
- Directed by: Danilo P. Cabreira
- Written by: Danilo P. Cabreira; Toto Belano
- Starring: Alma Moreno; Tet Antiquiera; Mat Ranillo III; Vic Sotto; Olivia Cenizal
- Cinematography: Vic Anao
- Edited by: Rogelio Salvador
- Music by: Tito Sotto
- Production companies: JPM Productions, Inc.
- Release date: March 21, 1980
- Country: Philippines
- Language: Filipino

Ako, Ikaw...Magkaagaw is a 1980 drama film directed by Danilo Cabrera starring Alma Moreno, Tet Antiquiera, Mat Ranillo III, Vic Sotto, and Olivia Cenizal. This was Vic Sotto's first and only drama movie until 2024, when he did the action-drama film The Kingdom, 44 years later.

== Cast ==
- Alma Moreno
- Tet Antiquiera
- Mat Ranillo III
- Vic Sotto as Jerico
- Olivia Cenizal
