= List of Ang sa Iyo ay Akin episodes =

Ang sa Iyo ay Akin (International title: The Law of Revenge / transl. What's Yours is Mine) is a Philippine television drama revenge series broadcast by Kapamilya Channel. The series premiered on the network's Primetime Bida evening block and worldwide via The Filipino Channel from August 17, 2020 to March 19, 2021, replacing Make It with You on its previous timeslot and The World of a Married Couple.

== Series overview ==
Season	Episodes	Originally released	
Season	Episodes	First released	Last released
1	62	August 17, 2020	November 10, 2020
2	93	November 11, 2020	March 19, 2021

- iWantTFC shows two episodes first in advance before it broadcasts on TV.

== Episodes ==
=== Season 1 ===
No. overall	No. in season	Title	Original release date	AGB Nielsen Ratings (NUTAM People)
1	1	"Pasabog na Simula" "Marissa's Sacrifice"	August 17, 2020	N/A
2	2	"Pag Ako" "The Repercussions of a Lie"	August 18, 2020	N/A
3	3	"Pangako" "Concealing Truths"	August 19, 2020	N/A
4	4	"Pagbabalik" "Marissa in the Flesh"	August 20, 2020	N/A
5	5	"Paghihiganti" "The Payback"	August 21, 2020	N/A
6	6	"Offer" "The Offer"	August 24, 2020	N/A
7	7	"Manipula" "The Manipulation"	August 25, 2020	N/A
8	8	"Pang-aakit" "The Seduction"	August 26, 2020	N/A
9	9	"Bagong Simula" "The Conception"	August 27, 2020	N/A
10	10	"Announcement" "The Announcement"	August 28, 2020	N/A
11	11	"Isang Bubong" "The Co-habitation"	August 31, 2020	N/A
12	12	"Father's Instinct" "The Childbirth"	September 1, 2020	N/A
13	13	"Agawan" "The Competition"	September 2, 2020	N/A
14	14	"Ilusyonada" "The Struggle"	September 3, 2020	N/A
15	15	"Motherhood" "The Challenges"	September 4, 2020	N/A
16	16	"Agaw Atensyon" "The Impossible Feat"	September 7, 2020	N/A
17	17	"Baby Hope" "The Envy"	September 8, 2020	N/A
18	18	"Duda" "The Suspicion"	September 9, 2020	N/A
19	19	"Selos" "The Crisis"	September 10, 2020	N/A
20	20	"Unang Harapan" "The Golden Boy"	September 11, 2020	1.3%
21	21	"Kutob" "Bringing Up the Past"	September 14, 2020	N/A
22	22	"Tiwala" "The Onset of Revenge"	September 15, 2020	N/A
23	23	"Kampante" "The Sexual Tension"	September 16, 2020	N/A
24	24	"Partner" "The Organization"	September 17, 2020	N/A
25	25	"Selebrasyon" "The Enemy Within"	September 18, 2020	N/A
26	26	"Plano" "The Benefit of the Doubt"	September 21, 2020	1.9%
27	27	"Pangamba" "The Assurance"	September 22, 2020	2.0%
28	28	"Threat" "The Decoy"	September 23, 2020	N/A
29	29	"Hinala" "The Seeds of Doubt"	September 24, 2020	N/A
30	30	"Palaban" "The Paranoia"	September 25, 2020	N/A
31	31	"Best Friend" "The Ex-girlfriend"	September 28, 2020	2.1%
32	32	"Espiya" "The Rivalry of Traitors"	September 29, 2020	2.8%
33	33	"Ahasan" "The Calm before the Storm"	September 30, 2020	N/A
34	34	"Rebelasyon" "The Acknowledgement of Paternity"	October 1, 2020	N/A
35	35	"Ebidensya" "The Investigation"	October 2, 2020	N/A
36	36	"Kompronta" "The Taunting"	October 5, 2020	N/A
37	37	"Pruweba" "The Retaliation"	October 6, 2020	N/A
38	38	"Alitan" "The Conflict"	October 7, 2020	N/A
39	39	"Banta" "The Witness"	October 8, 2020	N/A
40	40	"Kampihan" "The Unexpected Ally"	October 9, 2020	N/A
41	41	"Panganib" "The Impending Danger"	October 12, 2020	1.6%
42	42	"Konsensya" "The Rescue"	October 13, 2020	N/A
43	43	"Paninindigan" "The Determined Wife"	October 14, 2020	N/A
44	44	"Anomalya" "The Turn of Events"	October 15, 2020	N/A
45	45	"Katotohanan" "The Truth Unrevealed"	October 16, 2020	N/A
46	46	"Siksikan" "The Mind Games"	October 19, 2020	N/A
47	47	"Tarayan" "One Upmanship"	October 20, 2020	N/A
48	48	"Pagguho" "The Grand Reveal"	October 21, 2020	N/A
49	49	"Eskandalo" "The Termination"	October 22, 2020	N/A
50	50	"Rambolan" "The Broken Pieces"	October 23, 2020	N/A
51	51	"Pursigido" "The Persistence"	October 26, 2020	N/A
52	52	"Bisita" "The Unknown Heir"	October 27, 2020	N/A
53	53	"Karapatan" "The Threat"	October 28, 2020	N/A
54	54	"Krisis" "The End of Revenge"	October 29, 2020	N/A
55	55	"Ungkatan" "The Blast from the Past"	October 30, 2020	N/A
56	56	"Trap" "The Indecent Proposal"	November 2, 2020	N/A
57	57	"Deal" "The Cover-up"	November 3, 2020	N/A
58	58	"Bunyag" "The Truth Revealed"	November 4, 2020	N/A
59	59	"Paghahabol" "The End and the Beginning"	November 5, 2020	N/A
60	60	"Divorce" "The Devorce and the Proposal"	November 6, 2020	N/A
61	61	"Kapalit" "The Scorned Wife"	November 9, 2020	2.1%
62	62	"Pagtakas" "The Escape from Death"	November 10, 2020	N/A

=== Season 2 ===
No. overall	No. in season	Title	Original release date	AGB Nielsen Ratings (NUTAM People)
63	1	"Bagong Yugto" "The New Chapter"	November 11, 2020	N/A
64	2	"Kompetisyon" "The Loveless Marriage"	November 12, 2020	N/A
65	3	"Silent Treatment" "The Tight Competition"	November 13, 2020	3.6%
66	4	"Trust" "The Broken Hearted"	November 16, 2020	3.0%
67	5	"Saviour" "The Blossoming of Love"	November 17, 2020	N/A
68	6	"Chismis" "The Mysterious Shareholder"	November 18, 2020	3.4%
69	7	"Destiny" "The Unknown Competitor"	November 19, 2020	2.6%
70	8	"Rival" "The Revelation of La Sierra's Owner"	November 20, 2020	2.0%
71	9	"Marissa is Back" "The Return of Marissa"	November 23, 2020	2.1%
72	10	"Start Over" "The Jilted Lover"	November 24, 2020	N/A
73	11	"Saksak" "The Forbidden Love"	November 25, 2020	2.6%
74	12	"Ultimate Comeback" "The Grand Launch"	November 26, 2020	3.0%
75	13	"Pagtakwil" "The Leveled-up Revenge"	November 27, 2020	N/A
76	14	"Mother" "La Sierra on a Roll"	November 30, 2020	N/A
77	15	"Ahas" "Seducing a Happy Husband"	December 1, 2020	2.0%
78	16	"Plastic" "Love and Lies"	December 2, 2020	2.3%
79	17	"Promise" "Jake's Hope for Honesty"	December 3, 2020	N/A
80	18	"Parusa" "Breaking Hearts"	December 4, 2020	N/A
81	19	"Fake Son" "The Fake Son"	December 7, 2020	2.6%
82	20	"Reunion" "The Unpleasant Reunion"	December 8, 2020	2.7%
83	21	"Complicated" "Sibling Love and Hate"	December 9, 2020	2.2%
84	22	"Bitag" "The Trap"	December 10, 2020	2.8%
85	23	"Apektado" "Corporate Espionage"	December 11, 2020	2.7%
86	24	"Rebelde" "The Rebel"	December 14, 2020	N/A
87	25	"Patibong" "Fanning the Flames"	December 15, 2020	N/A
88	26	"Payneta" "A Family Crisis"	December 16, 2020	N/A
89	27	"Mommy Belen" "The Return of the Dead"	December 17, 2020	N/A
90	28	"Kakampi" "The Unwelcome Guest"	December 18, 2020	N/A
91	29	"Imbitasyon" "A Father's Effort"	December 21, 2020	N/A
92	30	"Awayan" "The Blended Family"	December 22, 2020	N/A
93	31	"Kapatid" "Mixed Emotions"	December 23, 2020	N/A
94	32	"Sabutahe" "THe War of Mothers"	December 24, 2020	N/A
95	33	"Tensyon" "The Fake Accident"	December 25, 2020	3.3%
96	34	"Bintang" "Falsely Accused"	December 28, 2020	N/A
97	35	"Alegasyon" "Seeking Justice"	December 29, 2020	N/A
98	36	"Hustisya" "The Original Sin"	December 30, 2020	N/A
99	37	"La Cascara" "Obstruction of Justice"	December 31, 2020	N/A
100	38	"Bagong Kaguluhan" "The Lost Years"	January 1, 2021	N/A
101	39	"Imbestiga" "The Truth According to the Deceased"	January 4, 2021	2.2%
102	40	"Kasinungalingan" "Danger Lurking in the Shadows"	January 5, 2021	2.4%
103	41	"Taksil" "Head on a Platter"	January 6, 2021	N/A
104	42	"Siraan" "The Bodyguard"	January 7, 2021	N/A
105	43	"Bodyguard" "A Confirmed Hunch"	January 8, 2021	5.6%
106	44	"Hearing" "Counter Revenge"	January 11, 2021	2.4%
107	45	"Case" "The Temporary Restraining Order"	January 12, 2021	2.2%
108	46	"Damay" "The Evidence"	January 13, 2021	3.2%
109	47	"Demandahan" "Trial by Publicity"	January 14, 2021	2.1%
110	48	"Hatol" "Against All Odds"	January 15, 2021	2.4%
111	49	"Pagbawi" "In Sickness and in Hell"	January 18, 2021	2.8%
112	50	"Kontrol" "Care for Hope"	January 19, 2021	2.4%
113	51	"Pagsubok" "A Ticking Time Bomb"	January 20, 2021	3.6%
114	52	"Ceasefire" "The Best Donor"	January 21, 2021	4.0%
115	53	"Donor" "Denying Help"	January 22, 2021	3.8%
116	54	"Pakiusap" "The Unexpected Donor"	January 25, 2021	5.2%
117	55	"Kite" "The Non-disclosure Agreement"	January 26, 2021	N/A
118	56	"Agreement" "The Life Saver"	January 27, 2021	N/A
119	57	"Operasyon" "The Surprise Traitor"	January 28, 2021	N/A
120	58	"Pagbabago" "The Evil Allies"	January 29, 2021	N/A
121	59	"Kasabwat" "Love or Revenge"	February 1, 2021	5.2%
122	60	"Traydor" "Good over Evil"	February 2, 2021	5.0%
123	61	"Takeover" "Leading with the Heart"	February 3, 2021	5.5%
124	62	"Learning Process" "Ellice's Scheme"	February 4, 2021	5.5%
125	63	"Suspetsa" "Hero in the Shadows"	February 5, 2021	5.6%
126	64	"First Move" "The Pretense"	February 8, 2021	N/A
127	65	"Panggap" "The New Member"	February 9, 2021	N/A
128	66	"Litrato" "The Locket"	February 10, 2021	N/A
129	67	"Bulag-bulagan" "The Scheme-s Pay-off"	February 11, 2021	N/A
130	68	"Locket" "Hearts Afire"	February 12, 2021	N/A
131	69	"Tapatan" "Jake's Decision"	February 15, 2021	N/A
132	70	"Agrabyado" "The Heartbreaking Truth"	February 16, 2021	N/A
133	71	"Heartbreaking Truth" "The Truth"	February 17, 2021	N/A
134	72	"Paghahanap" "Revenge and Remorse"	February 18, 2021	N/A
135	73	"Realizations" "The Runaways"	February 19, 2021	N/A
136	74	"Search Operation" "The Race"	February 22, 2021	5.2%
137	75	"Unahan" "Finding Clues"	February 23, 2021	5.0%
138	76	"Clue" "The House in the Woods"	February 24, 2021	5.8%
139	77	"Trace" "Seeking Refuge"	February 25, 2021	N/A
140	78	"Pagtago" "Search Rescue, and Murder"	February 26, 2021	5.0%
141	79	"Utang na Loob" "The Threat to Life"	March 1, 2021	5.2%
142	80	"Pangalawang Ina" "Marissa's Determination"	March 2, 2021	3.0%
143	81	"Paawa Effect" "Avel's Death Wish"	March 3, 2021	3.0%
144	82	"Pangalawang Ina" "Finding the Location"	March 4, 2021	N/A
145	83	"Don't Trust" "The Chase"	March 5, 2021	2.6%
146	84	"Chase" "The Accident"	March 8, 2021	4.8%
147	85	"Agaw Buhay" "A Brush of Death"	March 9, 2021	5.3%
148	86	"Truth Unfold" "The Truth Unfolds"	March 10, 2021	5.1%
149	87	"War of the Century" "The War of the Women"	March 11, 2021	4.8%
150	88	"Blind Item" "Never-ending Revenge"	March 12, 2021	5.1%
151	89	"Huling Linggo" "Sacrificing Lives"	March 15, 2021	4.7%
152	90	"Kasamaan" "The Entrapment"	March 16, 2021	4.7%
153	91	"Pagdurusa" "The Escape"	March 17, 2021	4.9%
154	92	"Dispensa" "The Thanksgiving Party"	March 18, 2021	N/A
155	93	"The Heart-Stealing Ending" "The Acceptance"	March 19, 2021	5.5%

- This program airs nationally on a cable channel/pay TV which normally has a relatively smaller audience compared to free-to-air TV/public broadcasters (GMA, TV5, and PTV among others).
