= Alvin Anson =

Filipino actor

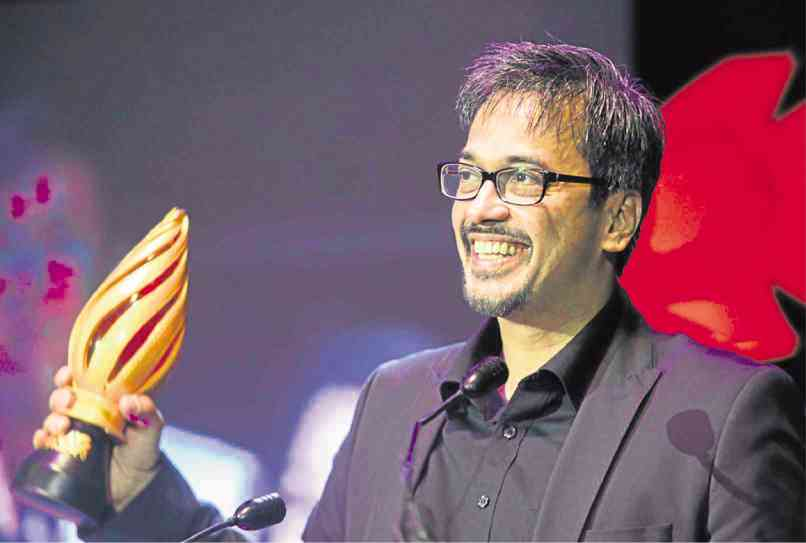
- Alvin Anson receiving his Best Actor Sinag Maynila Award for "Expressway"
- Born: Alvin Lorenz Clifford Anson; October 20, 1962 (age 63); Metro Manila, Philippines
- Occupations: Actor, producer, director, TV host, musician
- Years active: 1995–present
- Notable work: Way of the Cross; Expressway; Heneral Luna; Dolce Amore; A Love to Last
- Height: 1.78 m (5 ft 10 in)
- Children: 2
- Relatives: Boots Anson-Roa (sister)
- Awards: Sinag Maynila Awards - Best Actor in Expressway

Alvin Lorenz Clifford Anson (born October 20, 1962) is a Filipino actor, producer, director, TV host and musician. His works includes his portrayal of General José Alejandrino in the Philippine film Heneral Luna and TV series Dolce Amore as Favio De Luca.

== Early life ==
Anson began his career as a musician and a ledge dancer in various discotheques in the US. His home there housed his own music studio. During the early 90s, his dancing feet was featured on a Swatch commercial.

He holds a degree in Engineering and Liberal Arts and a minor in music from San Francisco State University.

== Career ==
Anson was discovered by a talent caster in a local discotheque in 1995. He was convinced to move back to the Philippines to pursue an acting career. Since then, he bagged supporting roles in several movies, mostly starring Rudy Fernandez and Ronnie Ricketts.

As an actor and producer of independent films, Anson is the producing partner of director Gorio Vicuna, a former Hollywood animator, and his wife Peejay Vicuna in their production house, GWARD, INC.

== Personal life ==
Anson is the son of actor Oscar Moreno, and the younger brother of actress Boots Anson-Roa. He has two daughters, Aliyana and Laisha.

== Filmography ==
=== Film ===
Year	Title	Role	Ref(s).
1995	Mangarap Ka	Jeffrey	
1995	Huwag Mong Isuko ang Laban	Gangster	
1996	Madaling Mamatay, Mahirap Mabuhay	Gang member	
1996	Itataya Ko ang Buhay Ko	Gang member	
1996	Bayarang Puso	Michael	
1997	Kamandag Ko ang Papatay sa Iyo	Gang member	
1997	Hawak Ko Buhay Mo	Alex's asset	
1997	Damong Ligaw	Mestizo rebel soldier	
1997	Wag Na Wag Kang Lalayo	Gun club member	
1998	Pusong Mamon	Officemate	
1998	Birador		
1998	Car Trunk		
1998	Toni		
1998	Kasal-kasalan (Sakalan)		
1999	Tigasin	Rex	
1999	Desperado, Bahala Na ang Itaas	Muslim rebel	
1999	Burlesk Queen Ngayon	Bodyguard	
2000	Nag-aapoy Na Laman	Bimoy	
2000	Palaban	Lito Cordova	
2000	Madame X		
2000	Kailangan Ko'y Ikaw	Alex	
2000	Ping Lacson: Super Cop	Velayo's man	
2001	Tabi Tabi Po!	Piring (segment "Engkantada")	
2001	Carta alas... Huwag Ka Nang Humirit	Ding	
2001	Mano Mano 2: Ubusan ng Lakas		
2001	Kapitan Ambo: Outside de Kulambo	Madman	
2001	Kapirasong Gubat sa Gitna ng Dagat		
2002	Burles King Daw O...	Mario	
2002	Diskarte	Mando	
2002	Katawan Mo, Langit Ko (Kamandag ni Margarita)		
2002	Hanggang Kailan Ako Papatay para Mabuhay		
2002	Gising Na si Adan	Rico	
2002	Hula Mo, Huli Ko	Clinton	
2003	Nena Inosente		
2005	The Great Raid	Rudi	
2005	Terrorist Hunter		
2006	Apoy sa Dibdib ng Samar		
2006	Pacquiao: The Movie	Isidra's husband	
2006	Rome & Juliet	Dan	
2006	Ligalig	Inspector Durana	
2007	Zombies: The Beginning	Mark Taylor	
2007	Island of the Living Dead	Fred	
2008	Black Market Love	Bertain	
2008	Anak ng Kumander	Rebel commander	
2008	Baler	Gregorio Catalan Valero	
2010	My Lai Four	Santanilla	
2012	Flames of Love		
2012	El Presidente	Felipe Agoncillo	
2013	Alfredo S. Lim (The Untold Story)	Roman	
2013	The Death Match: Fighting Fist of Samurai Joe	Brian	
2013	The Diplomat Hotel		
2013	Chasing Fire	George	
2013	Drug Mule	NBI officer	
2014	Ang Bagong Dugo	Frank	
2014	Water Wars	Jasper	
2014	Gemini		
2014	Bacao		
2015	Kid Kulafu	CHDF Leader	
2015	The West Valley Fault	Fireman	
2015	Heneral Luna	José Alejandrino	
2015	Manila's Finest	Akhmed Omar	
2016	Showdown in Manila	(uncredited)	
2016	Expressway	Ben	
2017	Way of the Cross		
2017	Ang Panday		
2018	El Peste		
2018	Goyo: Ang Batang Heneral	José Alejandrino	
2019	Exit Point	Guido	
2019	Tayo Sa Huling Buwan Ng Taon	Mr. Locsin or Isabelle’s Father	
2020	Coming Home		

=== Television ===
Year	Title	Role	Ref(s).
1998	Maalaala Mo Kaya		
2011	PNP Pacers		
2013	Never Say Goodbye	Ramil	
2015	Bridges of Love	Willy	
2016	Dolce Amore	Favio De Luca	
2016	Jack Irish	Adonis	
2016	Ipaglaban Mo: Kidnap	Jose Magpantay	
2017	A Love to Last	Simon Sumulong	
2017	FPJ's Ang Probinsyano	Alvaro	
2019	Sino ang May Sala?: Mea Culpa	Yandro Torres	
2020	Ang sa Iyo ay Akin	Ramon Villarosa	
2023	Of Money and Blood		

=== Shorts ===
Year	Title	Role	Source
2016	Padating		
2016	Ang Maangas, ang Marikit at ang Makata		

== Awards and nominations ==
At the Sinag Maynila Independent Film Festival 2016, Anson received the Best Actor Award for his lead portrayal in Ato Bautista's Expressway.

Year	Award	Category	Work	Result
2016	Sinag Maynila Film Festival	Best Actor	Expressway	Won
