= Kristo (1996 film) =

- Directed by: Ben "M7" Yalung
- Written by: Emmanuel H. Borlaza; Ruben Arthur Nicdao; Ben Yalung
- Produced by: Benjamin G. Yalung "M7"
- Starring: Mat Ranillo III
- Cinematography: Larry Manda
- Edited by: George Jarlego
- Music by: Lutgardo Labad
- Production company: Cine Suerte Productions
- Distributed by: Cine Suerte Productions
- Release date: March 27, 1996
- Running time: 152 minutes
- Country: Philippines
- Language: Filipino

Kristo is a 1996 Filipino biblical drama film depicting the life of Jesus Christ. Produced by Cine Suerte Productions, Fallout Studios and Oasis of Love Movement (by Fr. Sonny Ramirez, OP, host of the telemagazine Sharing in the City), Kristo stars Mat Ranillo III in the title role, together with Rez Cortez (Judas Iscariot), Ruel Vernal (Peter), Michael Locsin (John), freelance model and then college student Charmaine Rivera (in her first and only film appearance as the Virgin Mary), Amy Austria (Mary Magdalene).

The film also includes an all-star cast in their cameo appearances playing various characters. Among them are Gabby Concepción (John the Baptist), husband-and-wife pair Rudy Fernandez and Lorna Tolentino (as Simon of Cyrene and Veronica respectively), Aga Muhlach (the demon-possessed man), Rachel Lobangco (the Temptress, in which Satan is in a female form in the temptation of the desert scene), Sylvia Sanchez (the adulteress), Ang TV star and singer Lindsay Custodio (Salome), and Christopher de Leon (as Dimas as credited in the film).

== Plot ==
The film started on a prologue, "if the story of the New Testament replaced the setting from the Middle East to the Philippine Islands, what would the image and culture of the New Testament look like?"

The narrative of Kristo is based on the combined Gospels of Matthew, Mark, Luke, and John, but imagined as occurring in Classical Filipino society with ethnic elements and some aspects of Ancient Rome and first-century Judaea. Kristo was shot in various locations such as Intramuros, Lawton and Luneta in Manila, as well as in Laguna and Pampanga.

The film starts with an open book presenting the Nativity of Jesus in the form of illustrations. Live action scenes or the flow of the story follows the next page 30 years after, beginning with the preaching of John the Baptist and the Baptism of Jesus in the River Jordan. Kristo cycles through the various episodes in Christ's ministry, his death, and resurrection, ending with his ascension and its illustrated version on the last page with a Biblical message, and upon closing the book, it emerges that Jesus Christ is the one opening the book, reading about his life on Earth.

== Cast ==
=== Major roles ===
- Mat Ranillo III as Jesus Christ (Hesu Kristo/Jesucristo)
- Charmaine Rivera as the Virgin Mary (Birheng María)
- Amy Austria as Mary Magdalene (María Magdalena)
- Ruel Vernal as Peter (Pedro)
- Conrad Poe as Andrew (Andres)
- Edgar Mande as James the Great (Santiago)
- Michael Locsin as John the Apostle (Juan)
- Rez Cortez as Judas Iscariot (Judas Iscariote)
- Jorge Estregan Jr. as Matthew (Mateo)
- Daniel Fernando as Simon
- Patrick Dela Rosa as Thomas (Tomàs)
- Dindo Arroyo as James the Less
- Romy Romulo as Bartholomew (Bartolome)
- Tom Olivar as Thaddeus (Tadeo)
- Nikki Martel as Philip (Felipe)

=== Cameo roles (in order of appearance) ===
- Gabby Concepcion as John the Baptist (Juan Bautista)
- Rachel Lobangco as The Temptress (Mánunuksô)
- Romy Diaz as Satan
- Paquito Díaz as Herod Antipas
- Sheila Ysrael as Herodias
- Tonton Gutierrez as Lazarus
- Lindsay Custodio as Salome
- Aga Muhlach as the Gerasene Demoniac (Ang Sinapian ng masamáng espíritu)
- Sylvia Sanchez as the Adultress (Ang Mang-aapíd)
- Ricky Davao as Barabbas (Barabás)
- Dante Rivero as Nicodemus (Nicodemo)
- Maryo J. de los Reyes as Annas
- Tony Mabesa as Caiaphas (Caifás)
- Lou Veloso as a Pharisee (Pariseo)
- Romy Rivera as Pontius Pilate (Póncio Pilato)
- Maila Gumila as Claudia Prócula
- Rudy Fernández as Simon of Cyrene (Simón ang Cireneo)
- Lorna Tolentino as Veronica (Verónica)
- Gardo Versoza as Gestas (Hestas)
- Christopher de León as Dismas (Dimas)
- Dan Alvaro as Longinus (Longino)

== Behind the scenes ==
- This was director Ben Yalung's second religious film after Divine Mercy: Sa Buhay ni Sister Faustina ("Divine Mercy: In the Life of Sister Faustina") starring former matinee idol and MTV VJ Donita Rose in March 1993.
- Ranillo's eldest child, Krista, was not nicknamed after the film.
- Prior to playing Jesus Christ, Ranillo also portrayed the role of Lorenzo Ruiz in the 1988 film Lorenzo Ruiz: The Saint... A Filipino.

== See also ==
- List of Easter films
