= P're Hanggang sa Huli =

- Directed by: Ricardo "Bebong" Osorio
- Screenplay by: Robin Padilla; Roger Fuentebella
- Story by: Mario Cariño
- Produced by: William C. Leary
- Starring: Robin Padilla; Andrew E.
- Cinematography: Joe Batac; Caloy Salcedo
- Edited by: Rene Tala
- Production company: Viva Films
- Distributed by: Viva Films; Media Asia Group
- Release date: March 22, 1995
- Country: Philippines
- Languages: Filipino; English

P're Hanggang sa Huli (transl. Buddy Until the End) is a 1995 Filipino action comedy film directed by Ricardo "Bebong" Osorio. It stars Robin Padilla and Andrew E., alongside Matt Ranillo III, Charlene Gonzales, Donita Rose, Amado Cortes, Angelu de Leon, Daniel Fernando, Rommel Padilla and Jean Garcia. Produced by Viva Films, the film was released on March 22, 1995.

== Plot ==
Copper Guerrero (Andrew E.) is a police man who just arrests a group of cattle rustlers and teams up with Brando del Valle (Robin Padilla) who was insulted by their Major due to his stupidity. Brando and Cooper tries to stop some thugs leading to a car chase resulting the thug's car crashes into a gas station destroying it. Cooper was kidnapped along with Jessica (Charlene Gonzales) and her friends by a group of kidnappers led by De Joya (Mat Ranillo III). Cooper was tortured and beaten by De Joya and his men. Brando arrives to rescue him who is helped by Lopez who turns on De Joya and leads them to Jessica in the airport hangar where she is being held by De Joya and his men. They and joined by Lt. Punzalan defeat the kidnappers and rescues Jessica and her friends while Brando kills De Joya who tries to escape on a plane. One of De Joya's men Roque somehow still alive and badly injures Jing-Jing (Angelu De Leon) who notices this and jumps on Brando protecting from the gunshot and Brando throws his army knife at the still alive Roque and Cooper kills him. They mourn Jing-Jing as the Major and his police forces arrives who congratulate Brando but he respectfully rejected his promotion and orders a suspension from his position and he kindly accepts his offer and Brando hands him his badge and Jing-Jing was loaded into the ambulance. Then Lopez leaves on a motorcycle turning out that he was also a police officer who was sent by the Major to help him on the mission. Some time later Brando and Cooper had a romance with Jessica and her friend in the train.

== Cast ==
- Robin Padilla as Brando del Valle
- Andrew E. as Cooper Guerrero
- Charlene Gonzales as Jessica
- Donita Rose as Andrea
- Matt Ranillo III as De Joya
- Amado Cortes as Lt. Punzalan
- Angelu De Leon as Jing-Jing
- Daniel Fernando as Waldo
- Rommel Padilla
- Jean Garcia as Tammy
- Gloria Sevilla as Gloria
- Bebong Osorio as Lt. Zaragosa
- Noni Mauricio as Lopez
- Vangie Labalan as Patring
- Jun Hidalgo as Boy
- Liezel Sicangco
- Tweetee Vizcara as a lady in the grocery
- Glydel Mercado as a lady in the grocery
- Johnny Vicar
- Boy Roque as Roque
- Rey Bernardino as Trainor
- Oliver Osorio as a man of De Joya
- Joey Padilla as a man of De Joya
- Polly Cadsawan as a "pulis Maynila"
- Capt. Elmer Jamias as a "pulis Maynila"
- Conrad Poe as a "pulis probinsya"
- Zandro Zamora as a "pulis probinsya"
- Eddie Tuazon as a "pulis probinsya"
- Bomber Moran as a cattle rustler
- Ernie Forte as a cattle rustler
- Mario Cariño as a military man
- Nonoy Zuñiga as a military man
- Val Iglesias as Diokno
