= Exit Point =

Philippine action film

- Film poster
- Directed by: Ronn Rick
- Screenplay by: Anton Pelon; Ronn Rick
- Story by: Anton Pelon; Ronn Rick
- Produced by: Mariz Ricketts
- Starring: Ronnie Ricketts
- Cinematography: Paolo Magsino
- Edited by: Gerry Marto
- Music by: Francis de Veyra
- Production company: Rocketts Productions
- Distributed by: Viva Films
- Release date: February 20, 2019
- Running time: 96 minutes
- Country: Philippines
- Languages: Filipino; English

Exit Point is a 2019 Filipino Action film starring Ronnie Ricketts, who also serves as the film co-writer and director under the name Ronn Rick. It also stars Jackielou Blanco, Alvin Anson, Raechelle Ricketts, Edgar Mande, Renzo Cruz, Jerico Estregan, and Joachim Idinye. The film was released by Viva Films on February 20, 2019.

The film marks Ricketts' cinematic comeback after 2013's The Fighting Chefs, though a month after Exit Point's release, Ricketts was sentenced to prison for six to eight years after he was found guilty of graft by the Sandiganbayan during his tenure as chairman of the Optical Media Board and his involvement in the seizing of pirated DVDs and VCDs during the 2010 raid of the Sky High Marketing Corporation offices in Quiapo, Manila.

== Cast ==
- Ronnie Ricketts as Capt. Wilfredo "Waldo" Ocampo
- Jackie Lou Blanco as Director Sarah M. Fernandez
- Alvin Anson as Guido
- Raechelle Ricketts as Aliona
- Edgar Mande as Beki Bato
- Renzo Cruz as Captain Robles
- Jerico Estregan as Julio
- Joachim Idinye as Fred
- Sung Joon Park as Sung Joon Kim
- Natalia Moon as Mikee
- Mandy Ochoa as General Fernandez
- Brandon Ricketts as Bagets
- Neil Perez as Lt. Santos
- Luigi Fernando as Capt. Mendoza
- Rey Bejar as Bobby
- Bill Toledo as Ricky
- Jayson Garcia as Lucas
- Ramon Alatiit as Batang Taong Gubat
- Marella Ricketts as Attorney
- Romalyn Gascon as Waldo's daughter
- Irene Fujisawa as Aliona's mother
- Mariz Ricketts as Waldo's wife
- Annie Mata as Chinese wife
- Mikhayla as Aliona's sister
