= Badlis sa Kinabuhi =

- Directed by: Leroy Salvador
- Written by: Junipher
- Starring: Gloria Sevilla; Mat Ranillo Jr.
- Production company: MG Productions
- Release date: April 1969
- Running time: 130 minutes
- Country: Philippines
- Language: Cebuano

Badlis sa Kinabuhi (English: The Line of Life) is a 1969 Philippine drama film starring Gloria Sevilla and Mat Ranillo Jr..

== Production ==
Badlis sa Kinabuhi is a Cebuano-language film directed by Leroy Salvador and written by Junipher under MG Productions. It was filmed in black-and-white.

== Release ==
Badlis was released in April 1969 in the Philippines. It was known to have been featured at the 16th Asian Film Festival in Jakarta within the same year and in Berlin in the following year.

== Accolades ==
Accolades received by Green Bones
Year	Award	Category	Recipient(s)	Result	Ref.
1969	Asian Film Festival	Best Black and White Film	Badlis sa Kinabuhi	Won	
1970	FAMAS Award	Best Actress	Gloria Sevilla	Won	
1970	FAMAS Award	Best Child Performer	Frankie Navaja Jr.	Won	
1970	FAMAS Award	Best Picture	Badlis sa Kinabuhi	Nominated	
1970	FAMAS Award	Best Supporting Actor	Danilo Nuñez	Nominated	
1970	FAMAS Award	Best Director	Leroy Salvador	Nominated	
