= Gloria Sevilla =

Cebuano film actress (1932–2022)

- Born: January 24, 1932; Cebu City, Insular Government of the Philippine Islands
- Died: April 16, 2022 (aged 90); Oakland, California, U.S.
- Occupation: Actress
- Years active: 1954–2022
- Spouses: Mat Ranillo Jr. (died); Amado Cortez (died)
- Children: 6, including Suzette Ranillo and Mat Ranillo III

Gloria Sevilla (January 24, 1932 – April 16, 2022) was a Filipino film actress.

== Career ==
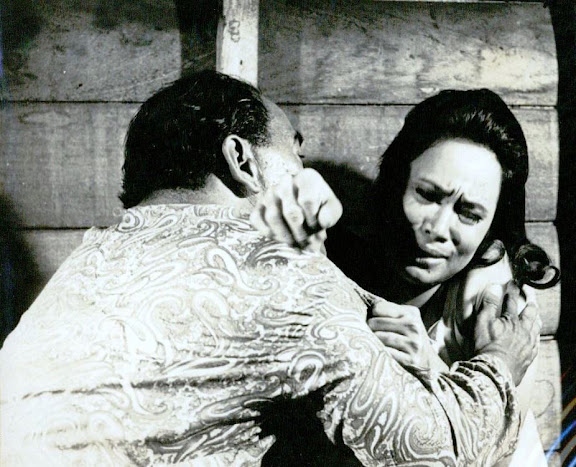
Sevilla in the Visayan drama Badlis sa Kinabuhi (1969)

Sevilla was heralded as the "Queen of Cebuano Movies" for her screen portrayal legacy in Cebuano-made movies in the Philippines during the 1950s and 1960s. The Gawad Urian Awards honored her with a "Lifetime Achievement award" while The EDDYS honored her with an "Icon Award", both for her contributions to Philippine cinema.

Sevilla received her first FAMAS Award Best Supporting Actress in the movie Madugong Paghihiganti (1962). She won the FAMAS Award Best Actress twice for the movies - Badlis Sa Kinabuhi (1969) and Gimingaw Ako (1973). Throughout her career, Sevilla had starred in several iconic films such as Dyesebel (1978), Guhit Ng Palad (1988), Matud Nila (1991), The Flor Contemplacion Story (1995), Kay Tagal Kang Hinintay (2002), Lapu-lapu (2002), Bida si Mister, Bida si Misis (2002), and El Presidente (2012).

Sevilla also remained active in Philippine television. During the 1970s she top billed the comedy Ang Biyenan kong Mangkukulam with Pancho Magalona and Chicháy. She also produced and starred in the sitcom, Mommy Ko si Mayor with children, Mat, Dandin Lilibeth and Suzette with fellow Cebuana Flora Gasser. Sevilla also lent support in dramas Be Careful With My Heart.

== Personal life ==
Sevilla's first husband was actor Mat Ranillo Jr., who died in a plane crash in 1969. They had five children. She subsequently married actor and director Amado Cortez, who also served a stint as the Philippine Consul General in San Francisco before his death in 2003. They had one daughter.

She is the mother of actresses Suzette Ranillo and Lilibeth Ranillo, actor Mat Ranillo III, and singer-composer Dandin Ranillo.

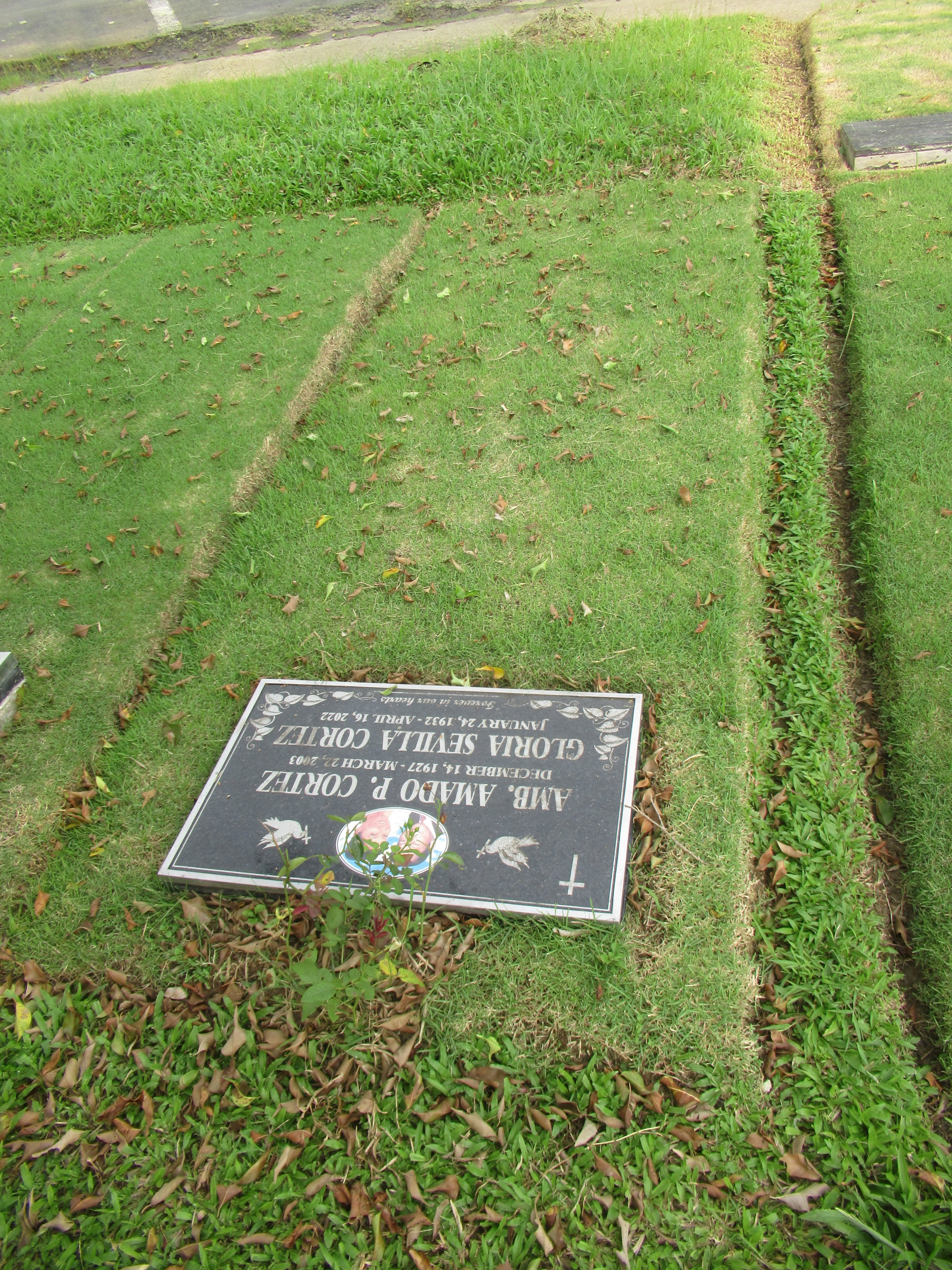
Amado Cortez-Sevilla grave (flipped)

She died on April 16, 2022, at the age of 90 in Oakland, California. She and husband Amado Cortez were buried at Loyola Memorial Park.

== Filmography ==
=== Film ===
Year	Title	Role	Notes	Source
1951	Princesa Tirana	Princesa Tirana		
1951	Leonora	Leonora		
1951	Pailub Lang			
1952	Utlanan			
1952	Inahan			
1953	Handumanan			
1954	Salabusab			
1954	Ifugao			
1954	Mister Dupong (Ang Dakilang Mangingibig)			
1954	May Bakas ang Lumipas			
1955	Papa Loves Mambo			
1955	Rosas Pandan			
1955	Ito, ang Aming Daigdig			
1955	Divisoria, Quiapo			
1956	Lagablab sa Silangan (Sunset Over Korea)			
1960	Mga Alamat ng Sandaigdig		"Alamat ng Waterlily" segment	
1961	Pantalan Trese			
1961	Tatlong Baraha			
1961	Mga Daing sa Libingan			
1961	North Harbor			
1961	Ang Maging Ulila			
1961	Ubos-lakas!			
1961	Bus to Bataan			
1961	Umasa Ka Mahal Ko sa Bilisan			
1962	Umaapoy Na Bakal			
1962	5 Matitinik			
1962	Adiong Sikat ng Tondo			
1962	Digmaan ng Mga Maton			
1962	Markang Demonyo			
1962	Sagot Kita			
1962	Sobra sa Init, Kulang sa Lamig			
1963	Madugong Paghihiganti (The Massacre)			
1963	Dear Eddie			
1963	Magtiis Ka, Darling			
1963	Ikaw Na ang Mag-ako			
1963	Ang Mahiwagang Lampara			
1963	Bulilit Al Capone			
1963	Maton sa Maton			
1963	Pitong Pasiklab sa Bahay Na Tisa			
1963	Tacio			
1963	Adiang Waray			
1963	Kami'y Kaawaan			
1963	Away Na!			
1963	Ang Tatay Kong Kalbo			
1963	Mestisang Bangus			
1963	Ecu Tatacut!			
1963	Ang Asawa Kong Barat			
1963	Mga Siga sa Looban			
1963	Dapit-Hapon: Oras ng Pagtutuus			
1964	Nagngangalit Na Damdamin			
1964	Gahaman			
1964	Nagbabagang Paraiso			
1964	Walang Duwag Na Bisaya			
1964	Dugo ng Sugatan			
1964	Mga Daliring Ginto			
1965	Akong Deadly			
1965	Strike!			
1965	The Great Escape from Hell			
1965	7 Mata-Hari			
1965	4 Na Agila			
1965	Milarosa	Flavia		
1965	Da' Best Show			
1965	Aloha!			
1965	Takdang Sandali!			
1965	Sapagka't Ikaw Ay Akin			
1965	Bolo Commando			
1965	Fiesta South America			
1965	Sapang Palay			
1966	Seksi Kumandos			
1966	Hanggang sa Kurtinang Bakal			
1966	Mga Bagong Salta (sa Maynila)			
1966	Sa Dulo ng Ating Landas			
1966	Ikaw... ang Gabi at ang Awit! (Arrivedercci Roma)			
1966	Mula Nang Kita'y Ibigin			
1966	Dr. La-way (Pare, Kwarta Na!)			
1966	Mga Bagong Salta sa Bahay Engkantada			
1966	Ito ang Pilipino			
1967	Bertang Palengke			
1968	Suntok o Karate?			
1969	Palad Ta ang Nagbuot			
1969	Parehas o' Laban			
1969	Ang Pulubi			
1969	Badlis sa Kinabuhi			
1970	Si Inday sa Balitaw			
1970	Nasaan Ka, Inay?			
1970	Basta Bisaya			
1970	Dodong Ko!			
1970	With These Hands			
1970	Pritil			
1971	Pobreng Alindahaw (Ulilang Tutubi)			
1971	Mag-inang Ulila			
1971	Plaza Miranda			
1971	Sonny Side Up		Guest star	
1972	The Hostage: Batang Cebu			
1972	Escape from East Berlin			
1973	Gimingaw Ako			
1973	Little Solomon en Sheba			
1974	The Pacific Connection			
1975	Banaue: Stairway to the Sky			
1976	Minsa'y Isang Gamu-gamo	Chedeng de la Cruz		
1977	Pinakasalan Ko ang Ina ng Aking Kapatid			
1977	Mariposang Dagat			
1977	Bakya Mo Neneng			
1978	Boy Pana: Terror ng Maynila '63			
1978	Emma Henry (Policewoman)			
1978	Dyesebel	Digna del Rio		
1978	Baby Doll			
1979	Angelita... Ako ang Iyong Ina: Part II			
1979	Iskandalo!			
1979	Aliw-iw			
1980	4 Na Maria			
1980	Awat Na, Asiong Aksaya!			
1983	Pepe en Pilar			
1986	Sobra Na... Tama Na... Asiong Aksaya!			
1988	Guhit ng Palad			
1989	Dear Diary		"Dear Party Line" segment	
1991	Matud Nila	Amparo Lagman		
1993	Buddy en Sol: Praybeyt Depektibs			
1994	Once Upon a Time in Manila	Amparo Lagman		
1994	Megamol	Marga		
1995	P're Hanggang sa Huli	Gloria		
1995	The Flor Contemplacion Story	Flor's mother		
1997	The Sarah Balabagan Story	Mommy Ines		
1998	Kay Tagal Kang Hinintay	Manang B		
1998	Hiwaga ng Panday			
1999	Wansapanataym	Manang Bising		
2002	Lapu-Lapu	Reyna Bauga		
2006	Pacquiao: The Movie	Nanay Parcon		
2012	El Presidente	María Agoncillo's mother		
2013	Boy Golden, Shoot to Kill: the Arturo Porcuna Story	Aling Puring		
2014	Children's Show			
2014	M: Mother's Maiden Love			
2015	You're My Boss	Lola		
2016	Kakampi			
2016	Kusina			
2017	Maestra			
2019	Pagbalik			

=== Television ===
Year	Title	Role	Notes	Source
1993	Maalaala Mo Kaya		Episode: "Salamin"	
1997	Esperanza	Lola Pacita		
2001–2003	Recuerdo de Amor	Doña Conchita La Fuente		
2002–2003	Kay Tagal Kang Hinintay	Doña Tilda Ventaspejo		
2003	Bida si Mister, Bida si Misis	Tiya Ina		
2006	Captain Barbell	Lola Melay		
2008	Komiks Presents: Kapitan Boom	Lola Gretchen		
2009	Zorro	Zita		
2010	May Bukas Pa	Milagros		
2010	Your Song Presents: Andi - Habang Buhay	Edgar's Lola		
2010	Precious Hearts Romances Presents: Alyna	Susana		
2011	Wansapanataym	Lola Josie	Episode: "Joy's Toys"	
2011–2012	Budoy	Coring		
2012–2014	Be Careful with my Heart	Felicidad "Manang Fe" Marcelo-Alejo		
2013	Kailangan Ko'y Ikaw	Esther Dagohoy		
2015	Nathaniel	Rebecca "Lola Becca"		
2015	Doble Kara	Manang Anita		
2015	FPJ's Ang Probinsyano	Purificación Moreno		
2016	Calle Siete	Nita "Nitz" Mabuhay		
2018	Asintado	Puresa "Puring" Dimasalang		

== Awards and nominations ==
Year	Work	Organization	Category	Result	Source
1955	Ifugao	Asia-Pacific Film Festival	Best Actress	Nominated	
1955	May Bakas Ang Lumipas	FAMAS Awards	Best Actress	Nominated	
1963	Madugong Paghihiganti	FAMAS Awards	Best Actress	Won	
1964	Tatlong Mukha Ni Pandora	FAMAS Awards	Best Supporting Actress	Nominated	
1964	Kami'y Kaawaan	FAMAS Awards	Best Actress	Nominated	
1966	Sapang Palay	FAMAS Awards	Best Actress	Nominated	
1967	Ito ang Pilipino	FAMAS Awards	Best Supporting Actress	Nominated	
1970	Badlis sa Kinabuhi	FAMAS Awards	Best Actress	Won	
1971	Dodong Ko	FAMAS Awards	Best Actress	Nominated	
1974	Gimingaw Ako	FAMAS Awards	Best Actress	Won	
1976	Banaue: Stairway to the Sky	FAMAS Awards	Best Supporting Actress	Nominated	
1977	Minsa'y Isang Gamu-gamo	FAMAS Awards	Best Supporting Actress	Won	
2007		FAMAS Awards	Lifetime Achievement Award	Won	
2013	Boy Golden	Metro Manila Film Festival	Best Supporting Actress	Nominated	
2014	Boy Golden	PMPC Star Awards for Movies	Movie Supporting Actress of the Year	Nominated	
2014	M: Mother's Maiden Love	Metro Manila Film Festival	New Wave — Best Supporting Actress	Won	
2015	M: Mother's Maiden Love	Gawad Urian Awards	Best Supporting Actress	Won	
2017	Kusina	PMPC Star Awards for Movies	Movie Supporting Actress of the Year	Nominated	
2018	Maestra	Gawad Urian Awsrds	Best Supporting Actress	Won	
2019		Gawad Urian Awsrds	Lifetime Achievement Award	Won	
2021		The EDDYS	Icon Award	Won	
