= Live Show (film) =

- Theatrical release poster
- Directed by: Jose Javier Reyes
- Written by: Jose Javier Reyes
- Produced by: Lily Y. Monteverde
- Starring: Klaudia Koronel; Hazel Espinosa; Ana Capri; Daria Ramirez; Marcus Madrigal; Simon Ibarra; Nikka Valencia; Oliver Hartmann; Martin Gonzalo; Paolo Rivero
- Cinematography: Eduardo Jacinto
- Edited by: Vito N. Cajili
- Music by: Jesse Lucas
- Production company: Available Light
- Distributed by: Regal Entertainment
- Release date: March 7, 2001
- Running time: 110 minutes
- Country: Philippines
- Language: Filipino

Live Show, originally titled Toro, is a Philippine erotic drama film written and directed by Jose Javier Reyes.

Produced by Available Light Productions and distributed by Regal Entertainment, the film was first screened in Germany at the 50th Berlin International Film Festival on February 11, 2000.

== Synopsis ==
The film depicts the lives of poverty-stricken young men and women, called torero and torera, forced to the trade of performing live fornication on stage of Manila's nightclubs in exchange for money.

== Cast ==
- Klaudia Koronel as Gigi
- Hazel Espinosa as Sandra
- Ana Capri as Rosita
- Daria Ramirez as Elma
- Marcus Madrigal as Jojo
- Simon Ibarra as Vio
- Nikka Valencia as Liza
- Oliver Hartmann as Jake
- Martin Gonzalo as Danny
- Paolo Rivero as Rolly

== Release ==
=== Name change ===
In 2000, Movie and Television Review and Classification Board chairman Armida Siguion-Reyna ordered a ban on Live Show. After the first ban was imposed, a "second (expanded) review committee" was created and subsequently overruled the decision and voted to give the producer, Regal Films, the permit to exhibit.

The film, however, was not shown in public theaters in the Philippines until the second week of March 2001 after its original name, Toro, which means pay-per-view sex in local slang, was changed.

=== Ban ===
Live Show created a public outcry in the Philippines. The Catholic Church severely criticized the Philippine government for allowing the screening of the film, which shows upper frontal nudity. After running for about two weeks, then President of the Philippines Gloria Macapagal Arroyo suspended Live Show's run in theaters and ordered the creation of an appeals committee, which includes representative of Macapagal-Arroyo and the film industry, to screen a review.

The banning of Live Show triggered a debate over the freedom of expression and the role of the Roman Catholic Church in the Philippines. On March 22, 2001, Nicanor Tiongson, Siguion-Reyna's successor, resigned from his post, and accused the Church and Macapagal-Arroyo of religious bigotry. He was replaced by Alejandro Roces.

Macapagal-Arroyo elicited criticisms for banning a film she had not seen. The ban also provoked fierce protests from the film industry, which accused Macapagal-Arroyo of buckling under pressure from Manila Archbishop Cardinal Jaime Sin, the top prelate at the time. On March 23, 2001, director Jose Javier Reyes, along with Klaudia Koronel and 2,000 others working in the entertainment industry, marched down Mendiola Street to protest the ban. Macapagal-Arroyo decided to watch the film, and kept the ban in place.

A three-man committee, which normally has five members, reviewed the film March 26.

On April 3, 2001, the Malacañang appeals committee ordered the permanent ban of Live Show from exhibition in local theaters. Then presidential chief of staff Renato Corona, a member of the three-man committee disclosed that members of the committee voted for an outright ban of the film while one member voted for extensive cuts on both scenes and dialogues.

== Reception ==
Live Show was exhibited at the Berlin Film Festival in 2000 and was shown in 12 other festivals in North America, Europe and Australia, where it earned praise for its brutal realism. Variety film critic Dennis Harvey praised the film's acting and cinematography, but said it "treats its sex worker theme with a heavy-handed seriousness while simultaneously milking exploitable aspects to the max".

== Aftermath ==
After watching Live Show herself, Macapagal-Arroyo called it "a well-made soft-porn film." In a bid to appease members of the movie industry fighting for the freedom of expression, the President cut the amusement tax by 50 percent to 15 percent and vowed to go after video pirates and said the tax rebate would no longer give producers an excuse to resort to making quick return-on-investment movies that cater only to the baser instincts.
