= Mang Kanor =

2023 Philippine film directed by Greg Colasito

- Promotional release poster
- Directed by: Greg Colasito
- Written by: Greg Colasito
- Story by: AFA
- Produced by: Melanie "Honey" Quinto
- Starring: Rez Cortez; Nika Madrid; Rob Sy; Joni McNab; Seon Quintos
- Edited by: Carlo Alvarez
- Music by: Sean Tuesday
- Production companies: A&Q Films; BlackBox Studios; Blue Ocean Films
- Distributed by: A&Q Films (AQ Prime)
- Release date: January 28, 2023
- Running time: 89 minutes
- Country: Philippines
- Language: Tagalog

Mang Kanor is a 2023 Philippine independent erotic film written and directed by Greg Colasito. It stars Rez Cortez in the title role. The film is about how the life of a businessman changed when his sex videos became viral.

The film is streaming online on YouTube.

== Plot ==
The film begins in the present time in a jail, where Attorney Galvez introduces Lindsay to Kanor, explaining that Lindsay wants to make a documentary about the life story of Kanor. Lindsay aims to help people understand Kanor's perspective. Kanor agrees, expressing remorse for his actions and a desire to apologize for ruining the lives of his victims and their families. Lindsay informs Kanor that she will record everything he says.

The story flashes back to when Kanor was young and still a police officer. One of his coworkers, Cesar, tells him they are going somewhere after their operation, and their chief wants Kanor to join them for a night out. When Kanor asks where they are going, his colleague Julius reveals they are heading to their hideout, where there are many new girls. Kanor is reluctant to join, but his colleagues insist, noting that their chief will pay them at the hideout. They tease Kanor, suggesting he thinks he'll be stuck as a lookout again because he doesn't have a partner. They emphasize that their chief's order requires Kanor's participation.

That night, Kanor, his colleagues, and their chief are drinking at the hideout. The chief notices Kanor is alone and calls over a girl named Betty to entertain him. Betty initially refuses, saying Kanor isn't her type, but agrees after the chief offers her twenty thousand pesos. In a private room, both Kanor and Betty are naked. Betty encourages Kanor to kiss her and seeks romance, but Kanor, feeling shy, is hesitant. Betty takes the initiative, kissing him intimately, causing him to climax immediately without penetration. Unsatisfied, Betty leaves the room and propositions Cesar and Julius, but they decline, saying they are already satisfied and want to go home.

The next day, Kanor's colleagues tease him about the incident. After his shift, Kanor is about to head home when he sees Maegan and Sheng on the street. He greets them politely, and Maegan responds kindly, but Sheng insults Kanor, calling him ugly and saying no one in their community is interested in him. At home, Kanor drinks alone, crying. When his mother sees him, he asks if he is jinxed because of his appearance. His mother offers moral support and hugs him.

While working, Kanor is about to meet with their chief when Julius informs him of an operation planned for that night. Their chief promises that if they complete the job, they will be paid generously and can retire immediately. The operation makes the news, and Kanor's mother watches anxiously. A reporter states that a group of police officers is engaged in a gunfight with drug lord Sebastian De Ocastro, resulting in the deaths of two officers: Lieutenant Chief Paul San Jose and PO2 Cesar Aguirre. The reporter adds that Julius Mendoza is in critical condition with a fifty-fifty chance of survival, while PO1 Kanor Valdez is safe, with only a scratch on his arm. After the operation, Kanor returns home carrying a black bag filled with money. The next morning, he learns from his colleagues that Julius has died. Kanor tells his mother he has decided to retire.

Back in the present, Kanor continues sharing his story with Attorney Galvez and Lindsay. He reveals that he didn't formally resign but simply abandoned his job. He and his mother moved to a new house, but she died a few months later. Kanor explains that he opened a Japanese restaurant, which grew successful over 15 years. It was during this time that he met Sandra and Lyka.

In a flashback to his restaurant, Sandra and Lyka struggle to choose food within their limited budget. After they share their predicament with Kanor, he offers them a free meal. He instructs his employee Bart to call Tisoy to prepare the women's order. After eating, Sandra and Lyka leave the restaurant, but not before Sandra kisses Kanor goodbye. Bart and Tisoy witness this, and Bart admits he has a romantic interest in Sandra.

Sandra begins to exploit Kanor's kindness, engaging in sexual relations with him in exchange for money, marking the beginning of Kanor's scandals.

== Cast ==
- Rez Cortez as Kanor Valdez / Mang Kanor
- Nika Madrid as Sandra
- Rob Sy as Bart
- Joni McNab as Lindsay
- Seon Quintos as Tisoy
- Emelyn Cruz as Lyka
- Rain Perez as Young Mang Kanor
- John Rhey Flores as Cesar Aguirre
- Carlo Mendoza as Julius Mendoza
- Via Veloso as Aling Lydia
- Marlon Mance as Paul San Jose
- Atty. Aldwin Alegre as Atty Galvez
- Chai-Chai as Betty
- Sherilyn Reyes as Maegan
- Purple Conde as Sheng
- Judy Ann Marasigan as Rose
- Merab Soriano as Emily
- Princess Latiza as Mildred

== Controversies ==
On January 20, 2023, The Movie and Television Review and Classification Board (MTRCB) issued Notices to Appear on to three entities concerning the exhibition of the motion picture Mang Kanor, and its related publicity materials.

== Release ==
Mang Kanor was released online on January 28, 2023 through A&Q Films's AQ Prime.

== Soundtrack ==
All tracks are composed and performed by Sean Tuesday, except where noted.

Mang Kanor OST
No.	Title	Writer(s)	Artist	Length
1.	"Magbabalik"	Carlo Alvarez	Random Mischief	3:50
2.	"Intro"
3.	"Saying No Means Goodbye "
4.	"Mother and Son"
5.	"Three Is Not A Crowd"
6.	"Tiboy's Charm"
7.	"Kanor's True Love"
8.	"Lust Crusade"
9.	"Something is Missing"
10.	"To All The Girls I F@*ked Before"
