= Mano Mano 2: Ubusan ng Lakas =

Philippine action film

- Directed by: Ronn Rick
- Screenplay by: Humilde "Meek" Roxas; Ronn Rick
- Story by: Ronn Rick
- Produced by: Eric Cuatico
- Starring: Ronnie Ricketts; Mariz; Rommel Montano
- Cinematography: Val Dauz
- Edited by: Francis Vinarao
- Music by: Jaime Fabregas
- Production company: Maverick Films
- Distributed by: Maverick Films
- Release date: September 12, 2001
- Running time: 115 minutes
- Country: Philippines
- Language: Filipino

Mano Mano 2: Ubusan ng Lakas is a 2001 Philippine action film written and directed by Ronnie Ricketts under the moniker Ronn Rick. The film stars Ricketts, Mariz, and Rommel Montano. It is the sequel to the 1995 film Mano Mano.

== Cast ==
- Ronnie Ricketts as Aldo
- Mariz as Laura
- Klaudia Koronel as Julia
- Dick Israel as Morales
- Rez Cortez as Tata Delfin
- Rommel Montano as Basco
- Maritess Samson as Dexter
- Dinky Doo Jr. as George
- Edgar Mande as Gonzales
- Alvin Anson as Rodel
- Czarina Lopez as Cecille
- Alex Canunguran as Fred
- Bruce Ricketts as Boyet
- Noreen Aguas as Ana
- Manjo del Mundo as Anton
- Topher Ricketts as Trainer
