= Kiss Muna =

Philippine television sitcom series

- Title card
- Genre: Sitcom
- Starring: Joey de Leon
- Country of origin: Philippines
- Original language: Tagalog

Production
- Camera setup: Multiple-camera setup
- Running time: 42 minutes
- Production company: GMA Entertainment TV

Original release
- Network: GMA Network
- Release: April 29, 2000 – September 10, 2001

Kiss Muna (transl. kiss first) is a Philippine television sitcom series broadcast by GMA Network. Starring Joey de Leon, it premiered on April 29, 2000. The series concluded on September 10, 2001.

== Cast and characters ==
Cast

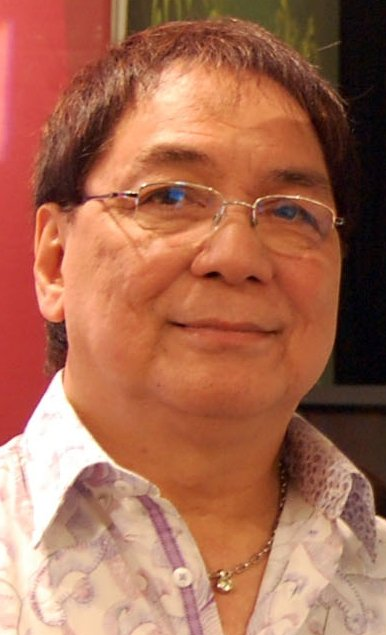
Joey de Leon

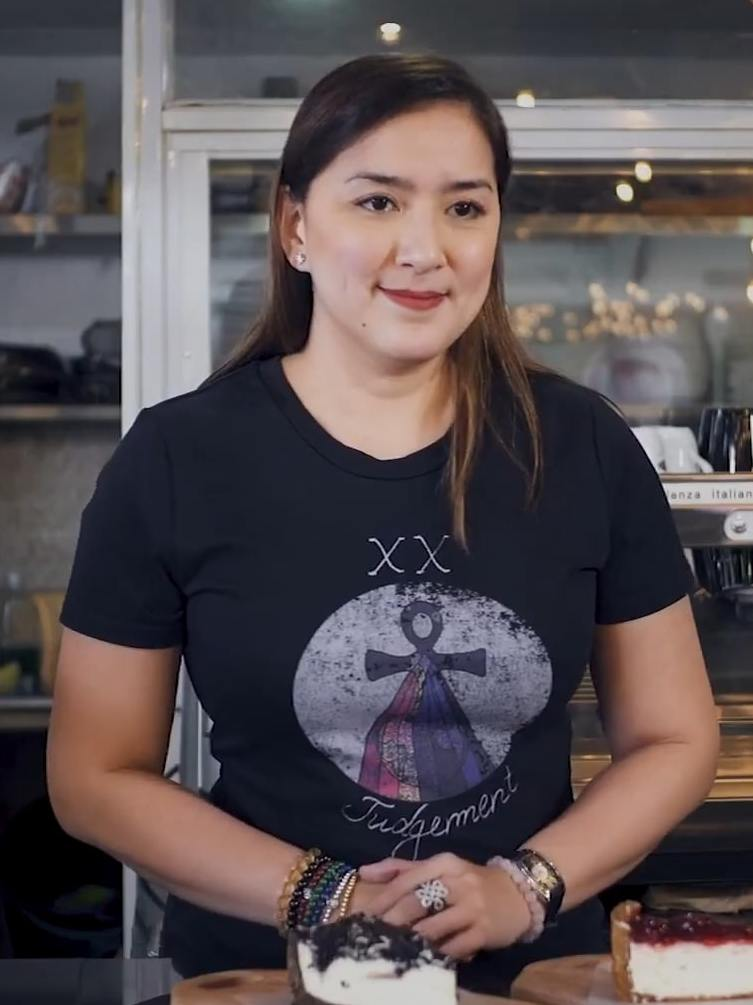
Ara Mina

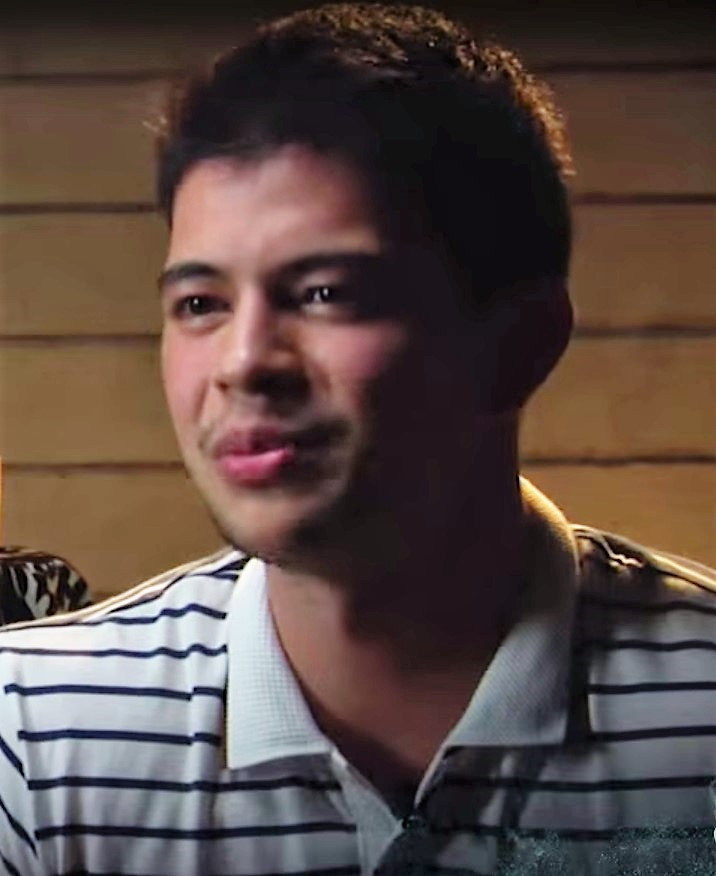
Rayver Cruz

Lead cast

- Joey de Leon as Stanley

Supporting cast

- Elizabeth Oropesa as Amparo "Ampy"
- Jomari Yllana as Third
- Ara Mina as Ara
- Isko Salvador as Kak
- Klaudia Koronel as Ditas
- Gary Estrada as Ver
- Ina Raymundo as Shirly
- Rayver Cruz as Piolo

Recurring cast

- Arnell Ignacio as a fashion designer
- Vivian Velez as a mayor
- Melisse Santiago as Piolo's classmate
