= Ang sa Iyo ay Akin =

2020–21 Philippine television drama series

- Title card used from 2020–2021.
- Also known as: The Law of Revenge
- Genre: Melodrama; Revenge
- Created by: Julie Anne R. Benitez; Dindo C. Perez
- Written by: Keiko Aquino; Jann Kayla Mendoza; Hannah Cruz; Jasper Paras; Levi Jun Miscala; RJ Carbonell
- Directed by: FM Reyes; Avel E. Sunpongco
- Starring: Jodi Sta. Maria; Iza Calzado; Sam Milby
- Opening theme: "Ang sa Iyo ay Akin" by Aegis
- Composers: Jonathan Manalo; Bernadette Sembrano-Aguinaldo
- Country of origin: Philippines
- Original language: Filipino
- No. of seasons: 2
- No. of episodes: 155 (list of episodes)

Production
- Executive producers: Carlo Katigbak; Cory Vidanes; Laurenti Dyogi; Ruel Bayani
- Producers: Marissa V. Kalaw; Ellice Tuason; Maya Manuel-Aralar; Julie Anne R. Benitez
- Production locations: Metro Manila, Quezon City, ABS-CBN Soundstage, San Jose del Monte, Bulacan
- Editors: Marion Reyes; Mark Segubience
- Running time: 25 minutes
- Production company: JRB Creative Production

Original release
- Network: Kapamilya Channel (Note: The series was originally going to be aired on ABS-CBN, but did not push through due to the restrictions imposed in response to the COVID-19 pandemic in the Philippines, and the shutdown of the said network. The show ended up on Kapamilya Channel instead, with simulcasted on A2Z and TV5.)
- Release: August 17, 2020 – March 19, 2021

Ang sa Iyo ay Akin (International title: The Law of Revenge / transl. What is Yours is Mine) is a Philippine television drama series broadcast Kapamilya Channel. Directed by FM Reyes and Avel E. Sunpongco, it stars Jodi Sta. Maria, Iza Calzado and Sam Milby. It aired on the network's Primetime Bida line up and worldwide on TFC from August 17, 2020 to March 19, 2021.

The series was also available for streaming on Netflix in 2021.

== Premise ==
Ellice is the beloved daughter of a successful businessman who is blessed to live a luxury life, while Marissa enjoys a simple life with her mother working and living at Villa Ceñidoza. Despite the vast difference in their social statuses, the two women become inseparable best friends. However, one fateful night changes the course of their lives forever, which will ruin their friendship and become sworn rivals.

== Cast and characters ==
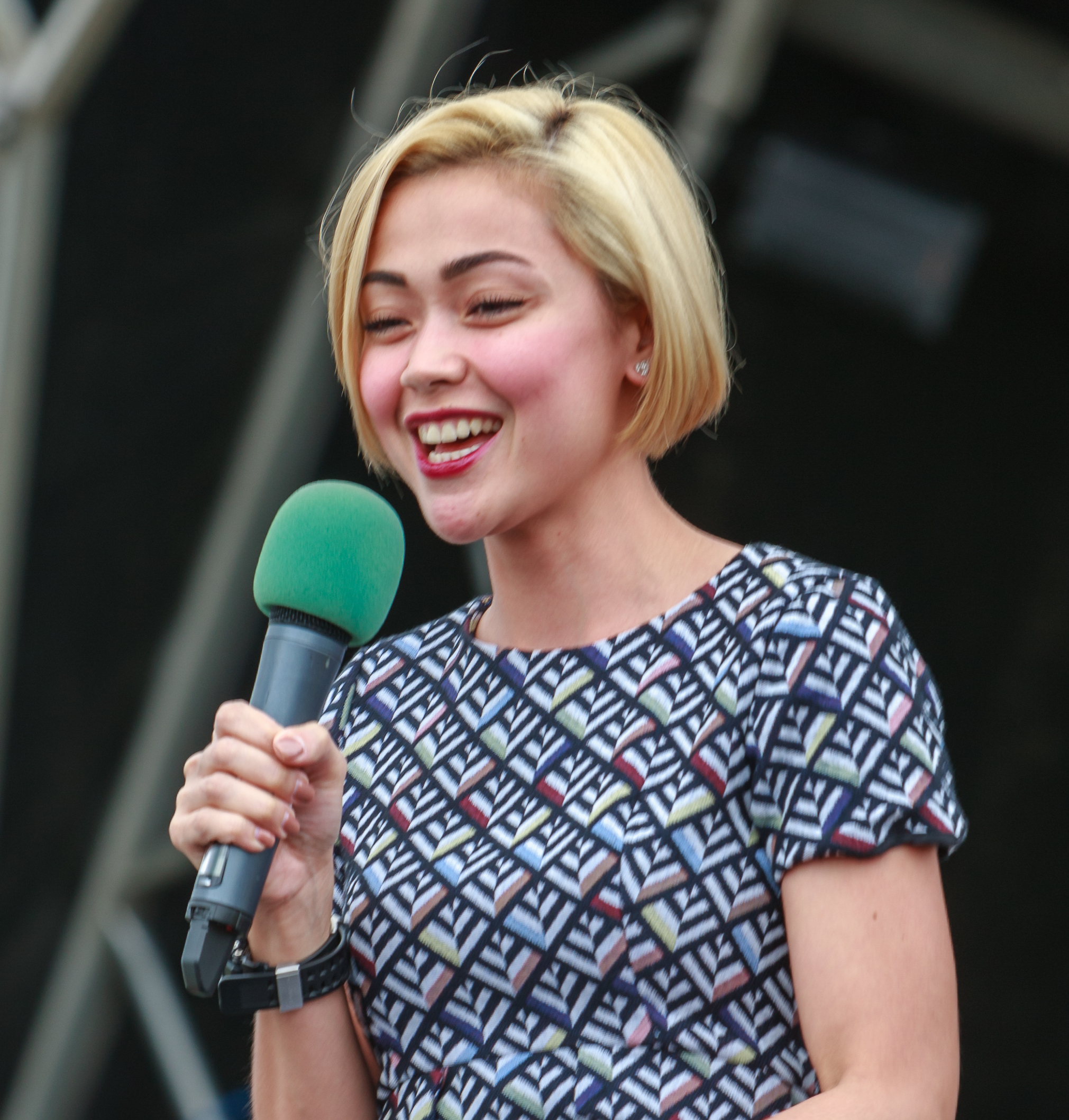
Jodi Sta. Maria

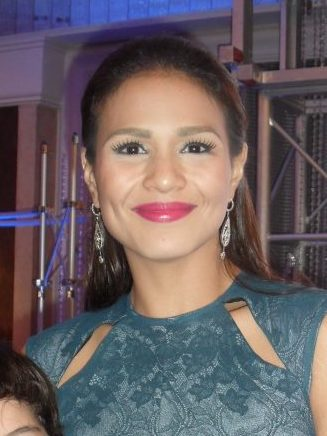
Iza Calzado

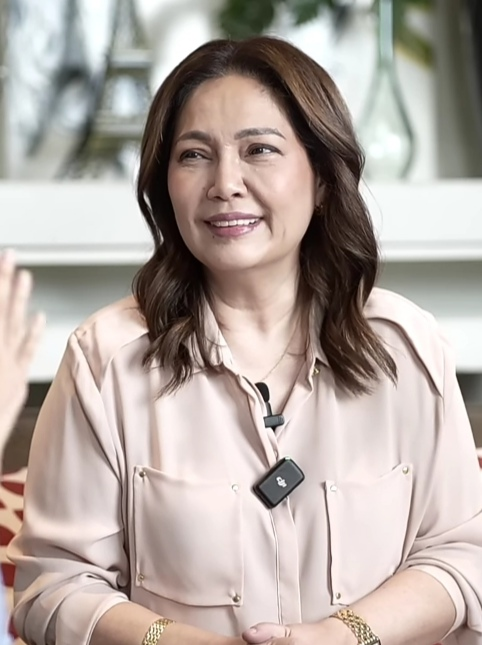
Maricel Soriano

=== Main cast ===
- Jodi Sta. Maria as Marissa D. Pineda-Zulyani / Marissa D. Pineda-Mansueto
  - Jana Agoncillo as young Marissa
- Iza Calzado as Ellice Ceñidoza-Villarosa
  - Yesha Camille as young Ellice
- Sam Milby as Gabriel Villarosa
  - Miguel Vergara as young Gabriel
- Maricel Soriano as Lucinda "Lucing" Dela Cruz-Pineda
- Grae Fernandez as Jacob P. Villarosa/Jake P. Zulyani (Season 2)
- Kira Balinger as Hope C. Villarosa (Season 2)
- Joseph Marco as Avelino "Avel" Mansueto Jr. (Season 2)
  - Izzy Canillo as young Avel
- Rita Avila as Belen Ceñidoza (Season 2)

=== Supporting cast ===
- Desiree del Valle as Sonya Villarosa-Escobar
- Simon Ibarra as Caesar Augusto
- Carla Martinez as Adelina Guevarra
- Cheska Iñigo as Carmelita Villarosa
- Liza Lorena as Magdalena Villarosa
- Nico Antonio as Blue Baltazar
- Jimi Marquez as Protacio "Pinky" Chavez
- Brenda Mage as Resituto "Tutti" Villas
- Tart Carlos as Chona Canlas
- Jef Gaitan as Cristina Villarosa
- Jenny Jamora as Helena Villarosa-Asistio
- Manuel Chua as Jared "Red" Adonis
- Aya Fernandez as Agatha Cortez
- Ced Torrecarion as Enzo Escobar
- Alvin Anson as Ramon Villarosa (Season 1)
- Paulo Angeles as Angelo "Gelo" Marasigan (Season 1)
- Michelle Vito as Heidi V. Escobar (Season 1)
- Poppert Bernadas as Silverio "Rio" Tan (Season 2)
- Karl Gabriel as RJ Villa (Season 2)
- Amy Nobleza as Charity Faith Santos (Season 2)
- L.A Santos as Alfred Vega (Season 2)

=== Guest cast ===
- Allan Paule as Nestor Pineda
- Johnny Revilla as Cong. Joaquin Montelibano
- Loren Burgos as Meredith Bautista
- Alain Villafuerte as Andres Franca
- Thou Reyes as Ruben Madriaga
- Joem Bascon as Francis Angeles
- Olive Isidro Cruz as Lestari Zulyani
- Caroline Garcia as Minju Gonzales
- Raul Montesa as Lamberto "Ambo" Fernandez
- Cherrylyn David as Rina Fernandez
- Aurora Yumul as Aurelia "Auring" Villana
- Giovanni Baldisseri as Mr. Perez, Ceñidoza Pearls board member

=== Special participation ===
- Lito Pimentel as Jorge Ceñidoza
- Albie Casiño as Victor Montelibano
- Zaijian Jaranilla as Jacob P. Villarosa

== Production ==
The project was first unveiled in January 2020 with a working title What Matters Most. The full trailer was released on March 11, 2020, on ABS-CBN, with the final title confirmed as Ang sa Iyo ay Akin.

The series was also filmed on ABS-CBN Soundstage (Horizon IT Park) located at San Jose del Monte, Bulacan.

During the enhanced community quarantine in Luzon, Iza Calzado was reported to be hospitalized on March 25, 2020, due to pneumonia and tested for COVID-19. Three days later, she was confirmed to have afflicted with the virus disease. After another test, Calzado tested negative for COVID-19 and was discharged from the hospital on March 30, 2020.

== Release ==
Ang sa Iyo ay Akin was scheduled to premiere on March 23, 2020, as part of ABS-CBN's Kapamilya Gold afternoon block. However, it was postponed due to the lockdown caused by the COVID-19 pandemic, and the shutdown of ABS-CBN.

After a long delay, Ang sa Iyo ay Akin premiered on the new cable channel Kapamilya Channel, as part of the Primetime Bida evening block, on August 17, 2020. In October 2020, the series entered its free-to-air broadcast on A2Z, in partnership with ZOE Broadcasting Network. For the last ten episodes of the series, it was also simulcast on TV5 through TodoMax Primetime block from March 8 to 19, 2021.

== Reception ==
Ang sa Iyo Ay Akin has garnered 253 million total views on YouTube as of March 2021, and was the most watched program on iWantTFC throughout its run. It also became the most popular TV show on Netflix Philippines upon its premiere on the streaming platform.

=== Accolades ===
Year	Award	Category	Recipient	Result	Ref.
2021	Laguna Excellence Awards	Outstanding TV Actress of the Year	Jodi Sta. Maria	Won	
2021	Laguna Excellence Awards	Outstanding TV Actress of the Year	Iza Calzado	Won	
2021	GEMS Hiyas ng Sining Awards	Best Performance by an Actress (TV Series)	Iza Calzado	Won	
2021	GEMS Hiyas ng Sining Awards	Best Performance in a Supporting Role (Male or Female — TV Series)	Maricel Soriano	Won	
2021	VP Choice Awards	TV Series of the Year	Ang sa Iyo ay Akin	Nominated	
2021	VP Choice Awards	TV Actress of the Year	Iza Calzado	Nominated	
2021	VP Choice Awards	TV Actress of the Year	Jodi Sta. Maria	Nominated	
2021	VP Choice Awards	TV Actor of the Year	Sam Milby	Nominated	
2022	Gawad Tanglaw Awards	Best Drama Series	Ang sa Iyo ay Akin	Won	
2022	Gawad Tanglaw Awards	Best Actress (Drama Series)	Jodi Sta. Maria	Won	
2022	Gawad Tanglaw Awards	Best Actress (Drama Series)	Iza Calzado	Won	
2022	Tag Chicago Awards	Best Actress	Jodi Sta. Maria	Won	
2022	Tag Chicago Awards	Best Supporting Actor	Grae Fernandez	Won	
2022	Push Awards	Favorite Onscreen Performance	Jodi Sta. Maria	Won	
2023	PMPC Star Awards for Television	Best Primetime TV Series	Ang sa Iyo ay Akin	Nominated	
2023	PMPC Star Awards for Television	Best Drama Actress	Jodi Sta. Maria	Won	
2023	PMPC Star Awards for Television	Best Drama Actress	Iza Calzado	Nominated	
2023	PMPC Star Awards for Television	Best Drama Actor	Sam Milby	Nominated	
2023	PMPC Star Awards for Television	Best Drama Supporting Actress	Maricel Soriano	Nominated	
2023	PMPC Star Awards for Television	Best New Male TV Personality	L.A. Santos	Won	

== See also ==
- List of Kapamilya Channel original programming
- List of A2Z (TV channel) original programming
- List of TV5 (Philippine TV network) original programming
- List of programs broadcast by ABS-CBN
- List of programs broadcast by Jeepney TV
- List of ABS-CBN Studios original drama series
