= Klaudia Koronel =

Filipina businesswoman and former actress

- Born: Milfe Dacula; December 19, 1975 (age 50); Zamboanga del Sur, Philippines
- Occupation: Actress
- Years active: 1997–2015

Milfe Dacula, better known by her stage name Klaudia Koronel (born 19 December 1975), is a Filipina businesswoman and former actress.

== Early life ==
Koronel was born as Milfe Dacula and the eldest of six children in a small community in Zamboanga del Sur, Philippines. Her father was a carpenter and her mother was a beautician. They were also farmers. Although she didn't have dreams of becoming an actress as a kid, she loved listening to radio dramas and watching movies. Her parents divorced when she was five years old. After her mother abandoned their home, she had to care for her father who then left her and her young siblings to their grandmother when he went to the capital, Manila. While her father was with them, she was beaten on the head with a cooking ladle and chained.

Living in Iloilo under her strict but responsible grandmother, she was able to focus on her schooling. When she was 10 years old, her parents got back together again and they moved to Project 8, Quezon City. They experienced extreme poverty in their time there, with their house even getting demolished at one point. She continued experiencing abuse from her father, who would make them eat pages of their notebooks or bite their fingers. When she was a teenager, she nearly burned her legs when a flat iron fell near her knees. Despite their struggles, she was able to graduate elementary school at Bago Bantay Elementary and high school in San Francisco del Monte.

== Career ==
=== Acting ===
After high school, Koronel first joined a group of dancing models. When the group disbanded she worked waitress jobs at Pegasus, a club, for a year. It was at this restaurant where she met the movie producer, Robbie Tan, who was scouting for new talent that can replace the famous sexy actress, Rosanna Roces. She initially rejected his job offer as she's naturally timid, shy, and never dreamt of being a movie actress but later changed her mind due to the bad treatment she received from the poor environment she was in, hoping the opportunity would turn her fortune around. Roces was also discovered in that same club.

Koronel signed a two-year, seven-film deal with Tan's company, Seiko Films. Tan also gave her her first screen name, Klaudia Estevez. She made her film debut in 1997 in the film Kesong Puti. She then did sexy movies such as Pisil (1998) with Rodel Velayo, and Anakan Mo Ako (1999) with Gino Ilustre. She appeared in action movies with Monsour del Rosario in Dugo Ng Birhen: El Kapitan (1999), Jeric Raval in Sagot Ko Ang Buhay Mo (2000), and Lito Lapid in Pasasabugin Ko Ang Mundo Mo (2000).

While filming Live Show, Koronel was required to do a frontal nude scene. Her experience filming that scene made her consider leaving the industry. She was nominated for a Gawad Urian Award as Best Supporting Actress for Live Show. Despite the success of that film, she decided to not do anymore nude scenes as to showcase her other acting talents, particularly in comedy and drama. From 2000–20001, she was one of the leading ladies in the TV sitcom Kiss Muna with Joey de Leon, aired in GMA Network. She also appeared in comedy films like Torotot with Leo Martinez, and Kapitan Ambo: Outside De Kulambo with Eddie Garcia, and the action film Mano Mano 2 with Ronnie Ricketts. Soon after, at the height of her acting career and fame, she left the industry and decided to complete her college education in New Era University with a degree in BS Computer Science.

Despite leaving the film industry, she later did several appearances in several films and tv shows. She was included in the cast of ABS-CBN TV series Mga Anghel na Walang Langit where she played Tere, Enchang's strict, aggressive and harsh mother. Her final appearance was in the indie film Estasyon.

=== Education and post-acting career ===
Koronel then studied BS Computer Science at New Era University. She had previously studied computer science at AMA University. As she had left the industry, she had no income. Sometimes she had to sign a promissory note to take exams because she couldn't pay the tuition fees. Despite her struggles, and computer science being a four-year course, she was able to graduate in 2005, in three years. She started her own internet business soon afterwards, an internet café, and several websites where OFWs could communicate to one another. Later on, she owned a homecare business (which her former spouse helped set up). She now works as a Certified Nursing Assistant (CNA) in America. She also assists in the international activities of the Iglesia ni Cristo.

== Personal life ==
Koronel met Andy Zhang, a Chinese-American businessman, through one of Koronel's online businesses. They married on August 28, 2009 at an Iglesia ni Cristo Temple in Diliman, Quezon City, Philippines. The couple moved to Gilbert, Arizona. In 2014, they divorced. Every year, she visits her only son, Zandy, (born in 2006) who is in the care of her family in Laguna.

In 1994, Koronel got into a fight with her father. He hit her, and soon after, she attempted suicide by cutting her wrists. Two years later, she attempted suicide again. In 1997, her father left the family for good. Her relationship with her father made her develop a phobia for men. During her marriage with Zhang, she attempted suicide twice. Despite her trauma with her family, she still loves them and tries to takes care of them.

In 2016, she was diagnosed with a uterine tumor, which required one of her ovaries to be removed.

== Filmography ==
Year	Title	Role	Notes
1997	Kesong Puti		Film debut
1997	Walang Dayaan Akin Ang Malaki		
1997	Linggo Lang Ang Pahinga... Dapat Lang!		
1998	Pisil		
1999	Gamugamong Dagat		
1999	Hubad Sa Ilalim Ng Buwan		
1999	Anakan Mo Ako		
1999	Dugo Ng Birhen: El Kapitan		Lead role
2000	Masarap Habang Mainit		
2000	Live Show	Gigi	
2000	Ang Babaeng Putik		
2000	Pasasabugin Ko Ang Mundo Mo		
2000	Subic Bay	Beth	Viva TV production
2000–2001	Kiss Muna	Ditas	GMA comedy series
2001	Tuhog		
2001	Larger Than Life		
2001	Torotot		Lead role
2001	Mano Mano 2: Ubusan Ng Lakas	Julia	Maverick Films production
2001	Kapitan Ambo: Outside De Kulambo		
2004	Spirits		
2005–2006	Mga Anghel na Walang Langit	Tere	Supporting role / Antagonist
2009	Estasyon		

== Awards ==
Year	Work	Award	Category	Result	Source
2001	Live Show	Best Supporting Actress	Gawad Urian Awards	Nominated	
