= Mat Ranillo III =

Filipino actor

- Born: Matias Archibald Ranillo III; October 5, 1956 (age 69); Manila, Philippines
- Citizenship: United States; Philippines
- Occupation: Actor
- Years active: 1977–2009
- Spouse: Linda Tupaz (m. 1981)
- Children: Krista Ranillo
- Parents: Matias "Mat" Ranillo Jr.; Gloria Sevilla
- Relatives: Matias C. Ranillo Sr. (grandfather); Suzette Ranillo (sister); Dandin Ranillo (brother); Michael Alan Ranillo (cousin)

Matias Archibald Ranillo III (born October 5, 1956) is a Filipino-born American actor.

== Personal life ==
Matias Archibald Ranillo III is the second of seven children and the first son of actors Mat Ranillo Jr. and Gloria Sevilla. He has 6 siblings including; actress Suzette Ranillo and musician Dandin Ranillo. He attended Lourdes School in Quezon City and spent his high school years between St. Vincent School in Dipolog and San Sebastian College. He studied Customs Administration in San Beda College, where he also played for the basketball team.

After years away from showbusiness, Ranillo was implicated in the Pork Barrel Scam.

== Filmography ==
=== Film ===
Year	Title	Role	Note(s)	Ref(s).
1977	Mga Bulaklak ng Teatro Manila			
1977	Mariposang Dagat			
1977	Sinong Kapiling? Sinong Kasiping?			
1977	Dalawang Pugad... Isang Ibon			
1977	Masarap, Masakit... ang Umibig			
1977	Sa Piling ng Mga Sugapa			
1977	Walang Katapusang Tag-araw			
1978	Isang Ama, Dalawang Ina			
1978	Pag-ibig... Magkano Ka?			
1978	Ligaya ang Kasawian Ko			
1978	ABC ng Pag-ibig (Teen-age Love)			
1978	Isang Gabi sa Iyo... Isang Gabi sa Akin			
1978	Kampus?			
1978	Dyesebel	David / Maro		
1978	Lagi Na Lamang Ba Akong Babae?			
1978	Baby Doll			
1978	Rubia Servios			
1979	Annie Batungbakal			
1979	Salawahan			
1980	Ako, Ikaw... Magkaagaw			
1980	Darling, Buntis Ka Na Naman!			
1980	Girlfriend			
1980	Barkada			
1980	Basag			
1981	Lukso ng Dugo			
1982	Palengke Queen			
1988	Kumander Bawang: Kalaban ng Mga Aswang	Conde Regalado		
1988	Lorenzo Ruiz... The Saint... A Filipino!	Lorenzo Ruiz		
1989	3 Mukha ng Pag-ibig	Roman	"Katumbas ng Kahapon" segment	
1991	Matud Nila			
1991	Huwag Mong Salingin ang Sugat Ko (The Buena Vista Story)	Fr. Michael		
1993	Ako ang Katarungan: Lt. Napoleon M. Guevarra			
1993	Pusoy Dos			
1994	The Elsa Castillo Story: Chop-Chop Lady			
1994	Minsan Lang Kita Iibigin	Alex		
1994	Macario Durano			
1994	Iukit Mo sa Bala	Vice Mayor Mario Ocampo		
1995	P're Hanggang sa Huli	De Joya		
1995	Sarah... Ang Munting Prinsesa	Capt. Crewe		
1995	Anabelle Huggins Story: Ruben Ablaza Tragedy - Mea Culpa	Rannie		
1996	Kristo	Jesus Christ	Credited as Matt Ranillo III	
1998	Ama Namin	Capt. Victor Santos		
2002	Jologs	Mr. Morales		
2009	Ang Panday			

=== Television ===
Year	Title	Role	Note(s)	Ref(s).
1991	Maalaala Mo Kaya		Episode: "Komiks"	
1994	Star Drama Theater: Carmina		Episode: "Hampas sa Alon"	
1995	Ipaglaban Mo!	Caloy	Episode: "Nasa Tao ang Gawa"	
1996–1997	Anna Karenina	Raul		
1997	Maalaala Mo Kaya		Episode: "Gitara"	
1997	Maalaala Mo Kaya		Episode: "Blueprint"	
1997	Maalaala Mo Kaya		Episode: "Puting Panyo"	
1998	Maalaala Mo Kaya		Episode: "Kopita"	
1998–1999	Esperanza	Louie Villareal		
1999	Maalaala Mo Kaya		Episode: "Video Cam"	
2000	Maalaala Mo Kaya		Episode: "Plane Ticket"	
2002	Bituin	Filemon Gala		
2002	Maalaala Mo Kaya		Episode: "Cupcake"	
2003	Buttercup	Eduardo Bala		
2006	Komiks	Danny		
2006	Now and Forever: Dangal	Ricardo Marquez		
2006	Sa Piling Mo	Jose		
2007	Natutulog Ba ang Diyos?	Mike Angeles		
2008	Dyesebel	Enrico Salcedo		
2008	My Girl			
2009	Nasaan Ka Maruja?	Teodoro "Teddy" Lozano		
2009	Maalaala Mo Kaya	Nancy's father	Episode: "Apron"	
2009	Katorse	Alfred Wenceslao		
2009	Darna	Dionisio	2 episodes	
2009	Precious Hearts Romances Presents: Somewhere in My Heart	Arnulfo Gorospe		

=== Stage ===
Year	Title	Role	Notes	Source
1994–95	Kristo	Jesus Christ	CCP Tanghalang Pambansa	
