= Patrick dela Rosa =

Filipino actor (1961–2025)

- Born: Perfecto Dela Rosa Jr. July 13, 1961; Calapan, Oriental Mindoro, Philippines
- Died: October 26, 2025 (aged 64); Bakersfield, California, U.S.
- Years active: 1983–2007 (as an actor)
- Spouse: Arnie Bella (m. 2012–2025)
- Partner: Kookoo Gonzales
- Children: 3 (with Gonzales)

Perfecto Dela Rosa Jr. (July 13, 1961 – October 26, 2025), professionally known as Patrick Dela Rosa, was a Filipino actor.

== Early life and education ==
Patrick Dela Rosa was born as Perfecto Dela Rosa Jr. on July 13, 1961, in Calapan, Oriental Mindoro. His father came from a military background while his mother was religious and conservative. He pursued a degree in economics at the San Sebastian College – Recoletos.

== Entertainment career ==
Dela Rosa first appeared in a Close-Up toothpaste television commercial under the J.Walter Thompson agency. He was scouted by Regal Films producer Lily Monteverde on March 17, 1983, which was Saint Patrick's Day which is the origin of his screen name 'Patrick Dela Rosa". He was still a college student at a time.

Dela Rosa made his film debut when he was 19 years old in the 1983 Regal Films work Shame which starred Claudia Zobel. He had no prior acting experience and underwent a two-week workshop under Frank Rivera upon the advice of Shame director Elwood Perez.

Dela Rosa featured in action films from the 1980s and 1990s and was known as a matinée idol. He usually portrayed antagonistic roles and his film credits include Kristo, Suspek, Ping Lacson: Super Cop and Ex-Con Other films were Uhaw Sa Pag-Ibig, Sinner or Saint, Harot, Bedtime Story, Climax, White Slavery, and Kiri. He retired from acting in 2007.

== Political career ==
After his entertainment career, Dela Rosa was elected a member of the Oriental Mindoro Provincial Board in the 2010 elections.

In October 2010, Dela Rosa was arrested in Quezon City after he was accused of attempting to rape a 20-year-old woman. He denied the charges. He was never convicted of the alleged crime.

== Personal life ==
Patrick Dela Rosa had a relationship with former actress singer Kookoo Gonzales with whom he had three children. He was married to Arnie Bella for thirteen years until his death.

=== Later life and death ===
After politics, Dela Rosa and his family moved to California in the United States after retiring from showbusiness.

Dela Rosa died at the Adventist Hospital in Bakersfield, California, on October 26, 2025, at the age of 64. He was diagnosed with lung cancer three years prior to his death during a cruise in the Bahamas.

== Filmography ==
=== Films ===
Sisingilin Ko ng Dugo
