= Pwedeng Pwede =

- Title card
- Genre: Sitcom
- Written by: Manny Buising; Divino Reyes; Rhandy Reyes; Woodrow Serafin
- Directed by: Woodrow Serafin; Erick C. Salud
- Starring: Robin Padilla; Redford White†
- Opening theme: "Pwedeng Pwede"
- Country of origin: Philippines
- Original language: Tagalog
- No. of episodes: n/a

Production
- Executive producer: Lengleng Lopez
- Running time: 90 minutes
- Production companies: ABS-CBN Studios; RCP Productions

Original release
- Network: ABS-CBN
- Release: September 8, 1999 – October 16, 2001

Pwedeng Pwede (also known as Puwedeng Puwede) (English: you can or absolutely alright) is a Philippine television sitcom series broadcast by ABS-CBN. Directed by Woodrow Serafin and Erick C. Salud, it stars Robin Padilla and Redford White, it aired from September 8, 1999 to October 16, 2001.

== Cast ==
- Robin Padilla as Carding
- Redford White † as Bruce
- Ogie Diaz as Charlotte
- Vhong Navarro as Samson
- Nida Blanca † as Kaycee
- Kris Aquino as Chedy
- Palito † as Tarzing
- Vanessa del Bianco as Samba
- Marissa Sanchez as Cha-Cha
- Katrina Nazario as Jamie
- Aljon Valdenibro as Jep-Jep

== Tonight's guests ==
- Claudine Barretto
- Archie Adamos
- Jaime Fabregas
- Manilyn Reynes
- Kier Legaspi
- Jinky Oda
- Celia Rodriguez
- Cesar Montano
- Jolina Magdangal
- Rustom Padilla

== See also ==
- List of programs broadcast by ABS-CBN
