= RJ Padilla =

Filipino actor

- Born: Ronnel Jake Antonio Padilla; January 22, 1989 (age 37); Angeles City, Pampanga, Philippines
- Occupations: Actor; comedian
- Years active: 2005–2017
- Agent: GMA Artist Center
- Spouse: Rosalie Bianca Abdelsayed (m. 2015)
- Children: 2
- Relatives: Padilla family

Ronnel Jake Antonio Padilla (Tagalog pronunciation: [paˈdilja]; born January 22, 1989) is a Filipino former actor and comedian. He starred in the film Sa Ngalan ng Ama, Ina at mga Anak (2014) and also appeared in La Visa Loca (2005). He is the son of Rommel Padilla and Annabelle Antonio, brother of Matt Padilla and Roanna Padilla, and half-brother of Daniel Padilla.

== Career ==
Padilla's career began in 2005 when he first appeared in Robin Padilla's movie, La Visa Loca.

In 2011, he became one of the participants in ABS-CBN's reality show Pinoy Big Brother: Unlimited.

In 2012, Padilla transferred to GMA Network. He worked with Dennis Trillo and Marian Rivera in the Philippine adaptation of the Korean drama Temptation of Wife.

In 2013, before joining the gag show Bubble Gang, his final project in ABS-CBN is Apoy Sa Dagat, where he portrayed the role of young Anton.

== Personal life ==
He is married to Rosalie Bianca Abdelsayed since October 18, 2015. They have two children named Raniaah Amira (born 2013) and Royce Aaliyah (born 2016).

In 2017, Padilla left the entertainment industry and migrated to Australia with his family.

== Filmography ==
=== Film ===
Year	Title	Role
2005	La Visa Loca	Young Jess Huson
2014	Sa Ngalan ng Ama, Ina at mga Anak	Ardut
2014	Basement	Dondie
2014	Bonifacio: Ang Unang Pangulo	Gary

=== Television ===
Year	Title	Role	Notes
2017	Destined to be Yours	Arman	Recurring cast
2016	Magpakailanman: Ang Hinagpis Ng Isang Ina	Rowden Go	Episode guest
2016	MARS	Himself	Guest
2016	Alamat ng Sampaloc	Pala / Narrator	Episode guest
2016	Dear Uge: Face Your Problem	Jomar	Episode guest
2016	Laff Camera Action	Himself	Contestant
2015; 2016	Eat Bulaga!	Himself	Bulaga Pa More : Novelty Pa More / Battle of the Champions contestant (2015); Challenge Accepted contestant (2016)
2015	Juan Tamad	Miong	Supporting cast
2015	InstaDad	Franco	Supporting cast
2015	The Ryzza Mae Show	Himself	Guest
2014	Dading	Dindo	Guest cast
2014	Carmela	JP Tolentino	Supporting cast
2013	Genesis	Fernando de Guzman	Guest cast
2013	Adarna	Roco	Guest cast
2013	Showbiz Inside Report	Himself	Guest
2013–17; 2020	Bubble Gang	Himself / Various roles	Mainstay / Cast member (2013–17); Guest (2020)
2013	With a Smile	Onyx	Supporting cast
2013	Apoy sa Dagat	Young Anton	Guest cast
2012–13	Temptation of Wife	Norman O. Corona	Recurring cast
2011	Pinoy Big Brother: Unlimited	Himself	Housemate
