= Mistah =

Mistah may refer to:

- Mistah F.A.B. (born 1982), American rapper, record producer, entrepreneur and activist
- Mistah (film), a 1994 Filipino action film
