= La Visa Loca =

- Directed by: Mark Meily
- Written by: Mark Meily
- Produced by: Tony Gloria; Sharon Cuneta
- Starring: Robin Padilla
- Cinematography: Lee Meily
- Edited by: Danny Añonuevo; Ike Veneracion
- Music by: Vincent de Jesus
- Production company: Unitel Pictures
- Distributed by: Unitel Pictures
- Release date: May 25, 2005
- Country: Philippines
- Language: Filipino

La Visa Loca is a 2005 Filipino comedy-drama film written and directed by Mark Meily. The film stars Robin Padilla, Rufa Mae Quinto and Johnny Delgado. The plot concerns a taxi driver who dreams of going to the United States.

== Plot ==
Jess Huson is a Filipino taxi driver who dreamed of obtaining a visa to be able to go to the United States. Jess meets his ex-girlfriend and her young son Jason who might actually be his. However, his visa application was denied. Jess's aging but randy diabetic father spends his days watching TV. One day, the famous TV host Nigel Adams came to the Philippines and Jess becomes his guide. He learns Nigel's brother was the one who operated one of the biggest nursing aid agencies in the US East Coast.

== Cast ==
- Robin Padilla as Jess Huson
- Johnny Delgado as Papang
- Rufa Mae Quinto as Mara
- Paul Holme as Nigel Adams
- David Shannon as David
- Kurt Perez as Jason
- RJ Padilla as Young Jess

== Film name ==
The name of the film is a reference to one of Ricky Martin's famous songs, "Livin' la Vida Loca".
