= Dilim =

2014 film by José Javier Reyes

- Theatrical release poster
- Directed by: Jose Javier Reyes
- Written by: Jose Javier Reyes
- Produced by: Lily Monteverde; Roselle Monteverde
- Starring: Kylie Padilla; Rayver Cruz; Ella Cruz
- Cinematography: Patrick Lee Layugan
- Edited by: Carlo Francisco Manatad
- Music by: Emerzon Texon
- Production companies: Regal Multimedia, Inc.
- Distributed by: GMA Films
- Release date: October 22, 2014
- Running time: 95 minutes
- Country: Philippines
- Language: Filipino

Dilim (lit. 'Darkness') is a 2014 Filipino horror film written and directed by Jose Javier Reyes. It was released by Regal Entertainment and stars Kylie Padilla, Rayver Cruz, and Ella Cruz.

== Plot ==
Maritess (Kylie Padilla), a nursing student gets plagued by inexplicable nightmares when she moves into a dormitory. On a trip to Quiapo, a seer tells her that she is a conduit between the living and the dead, and that ghosts are drawn to her because she's one of the few who can help them cross to the other side. Back at the dorm, Maritess meets Mia (Ella Cruz), her fellow boarder, and things get even stranger. Her nightmares get worse and she confides in a newfound friend, Emerson (Rayver Cruz). Maritess eventually discovers that Mia is a ghost of a nursing student who, along with her friend Aya (Nathalie Hart) disappeared about five years ago and the history unfolds.

The flirty Aya had a habit of going out on blind dates with men she met online, and usually drags Mia along on these dates. Aya has epilepsy and takes maintenance meds. They meet up with Quinito Castañeda (Rafael Rosell) and his friend, Danny (Joross Gamboa) who take them to a beach resort in Cavite. They start drinking. Mia becomes overly protective which prompts Danny to invite her to chill outside, leaving Aya alone with Quinito. Things start to heat up between the two and Quinito gives Aya a pill which promptly induces an epilepsy attack. Quinto panics and end up putting a pillow over Aya's head eventually killing her. Mia walks in just in time and goes into hysterics, and in Danny ends up killing her. The two girls are placed in a drum and is brought to the beach. One of them is still alive, and Quinito quickly finishes her off. Both drums are sealed and dropped into the ocean. Back in the dorm, police are alerted about the girls disappearance, but with no leads the investigation goes cold.

Mia tells Maritess that she is the only one who can help solve their murders and give them closure. Maritess enlists Emerson's help, and with a few other friends track down a phone number of paranormal Aya wrote down in her planner. The phone number is Quinito's, and Maritess and Emerson reports this to the police who, instead of following up brushes the two off. One of the investigators eventually decides to follow up and contacts Quinito, but is easily convinced that he is not involved. He smartly provides Quinito with Maritess's information though. Quinito contacts Danny and convinces him to bring Maritess and Emerson to the beach house to 'talk', and the two somehow is duped into going with him. . Quinito confronts Maritess and Emerson, it quickly turns ugly, and against Danny's protests, Quinito brings out a gun and threatens to shoot the two. Emerson gets injured, and as Quinito tries to shoot Maritess, the ghosts of Mia and Aya emerge from the beach and drag Quinito and Danny to the ocean.

== Cast ==
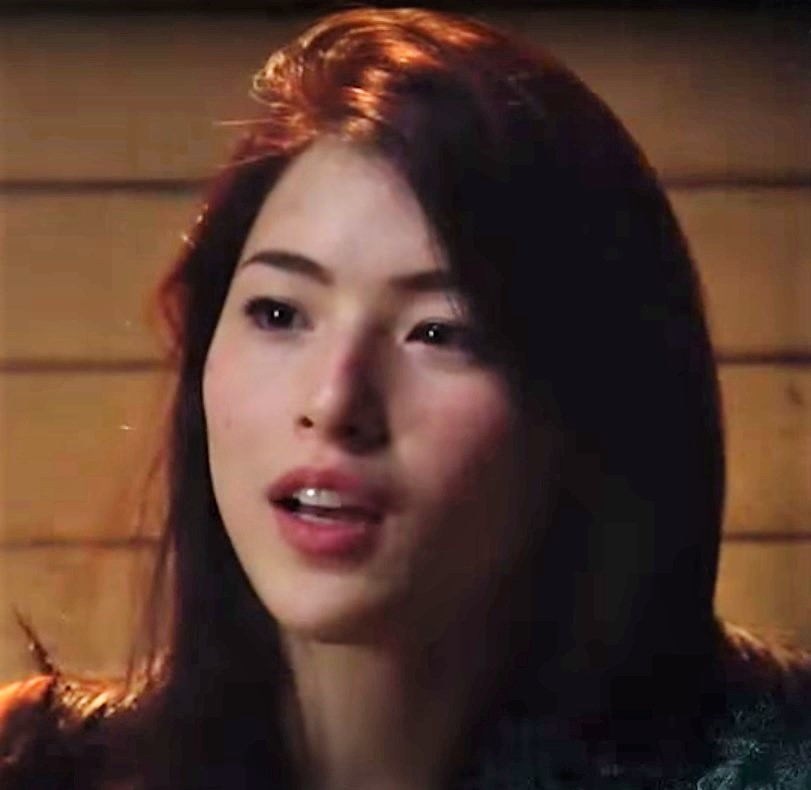
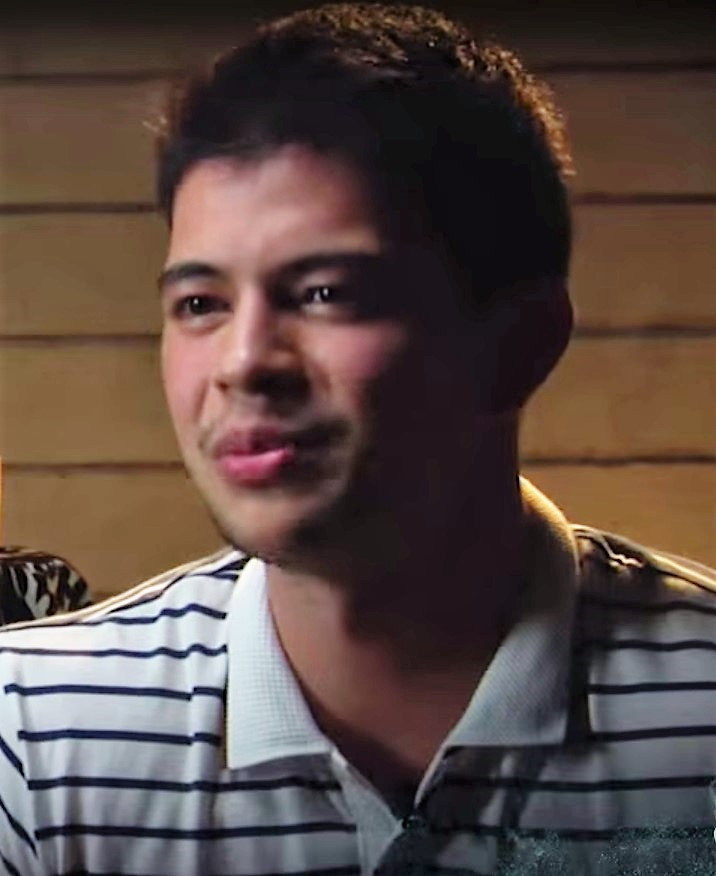
Kylie Padilla (left) and Rayver Cruz (right) discussing the making of Dilim in 2014
- Kylie Padilla as Maritess
- Rayver Cruz as Emerson "Emer" Garcia
- Rafael Rosell as Quinito Castañeda
- Joross Gamboa as Danny
- Ella Cruz as Nemia/Mia
- Nathalie Hart as Aya
- Lui Manansala as Ludy
- Manny Castañeda as Mang Damian
- Alora Sasam as Princess
- Ruby Ruiz as Aling Payang
- Dianne Medina as Shelly
- Kevin Santos as Benjo
- Ynna Asistio as Trina
- Kiko Estrada as Nelson

== Reception ==
Oggs Cruz of Rappler finds Dilim as a standard but forgettable horror film. Philbert Dy finds the movie does not provide scares and criticized the characters as dense.

== See also ==
- List of ghost films
