= Lab Kita, Bilib Ka Ba? =

1995 Philippine action comedy film

- Directed by: Gene Palomo
- Screenplay by: Humilde "Meek" Roxas
- Produced by: Inday Badiday
- Starring: Robin Padilla; Ruffa Gutierrez
- Edited by: Rene Tala
- Music by: Nonong Buencamino
- Production companies: Moviearts Films; Aries Vision Productions
- Distributed by: Moviearts Films
- Release date: October 12, 1994
- Running time: 123 minutes
- Country: Philippines
- Language: Filipino

Lab Kita, Bilib Ka Ba? is a 1994 Philippine romantic action film directed by Gene Palomo. The film stars Robin Padilla and Ruffa Gutierrez.

== Cast ==
- Robin Padilla as Carlos / Billy
- Ruffa Gutierrez as Gemma
- Charito Solis as Chayong
- Jess Lapid Jr. as Marco
- Jaclyn Jose as Olga
- Derick Hiballer as Romy
- Dan Alvaro as Alvaro
- Gabriel Romulo as Romulo
- Ramon Christopher as Boogie
- Amado Cortez as Mario
- Mely Tagasa as Yaya
- Augusto Victa as Ancho
- King Gutierrez as Marco's Henchman
- June Hidalgo as Marco's Henchman
- July Hidalgo as Marco's Henchman

== Production ==
Production took place while Robin Padilla was on bail. His involvement in the film caught the attention of Viva Films, which sued him for breach of contract in which he is an exclusive artist. He left two films with Viva, including Oo Na, Sige Na, unfinished.

== Release ==
The film was slated to be released in July. However, it didn't push through due to Ruffa Gutierrez's involvement in the 1994 Manila Film Festival scam, resulting to her being temporarily banned from the theaters, and a string of lawsuits Robin Padilla faced at that time, including his conviction for illegal possession of firearms and his breach of contract with Viva. After things were sorted out, the film was finally released in October.
