= Agos (TV series) =

Philippine television drama series

- Also known as: Now and Forever: Agos; Stream of Life
- Genre: Drama
- Developed by: Don Michael Perez
- Written by: Kit Villanueva-Langit; Des Garbes-Severino; Luningning Interio-Ribay
- Directed by: Mac Alejandre
- Starring: Sunshine Dizon; Dennis Trillo; Tanya Garcia; Lani Mercado; Christopher de Leon
- Theme music composer: Vince de Jesus
- Opening theme: "Now and Forever" by Kyla
- Country of origin: Philippines
- Original language: Tagalog
- No. of episodes: 55

Production
- Executive producer: Camille Pengson
- Camera setup: Multiple-camera setup
- Running time: 30 minutes
- Production company: GMA Entertainment TV

Original release
- Network: GMA Network
- Release: October 24, 2005 – January 6, 2006

Agos (transl. stream / international title: Stream of Life) is a Philippine television drama series broadcast by GMA Network. The series is the third installment of Now and Forever. Directed by Mac Alejandre, it stars Sunshine Dizon, Dennis Trillo, Tanya Garcia, Lani Mercado and Christopher de Leon. It premiered on October 24, 2005. The series concluded on January 6, 2006, with a total of 55 episodes.

== Cast and characters ==
Cast

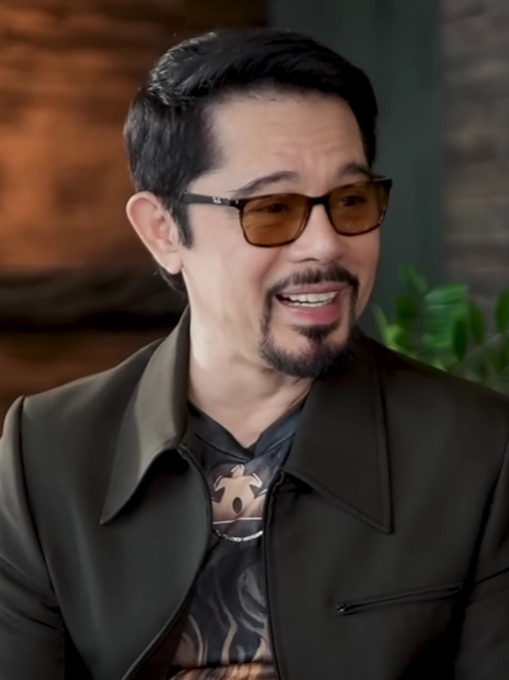
Christopher de Leon

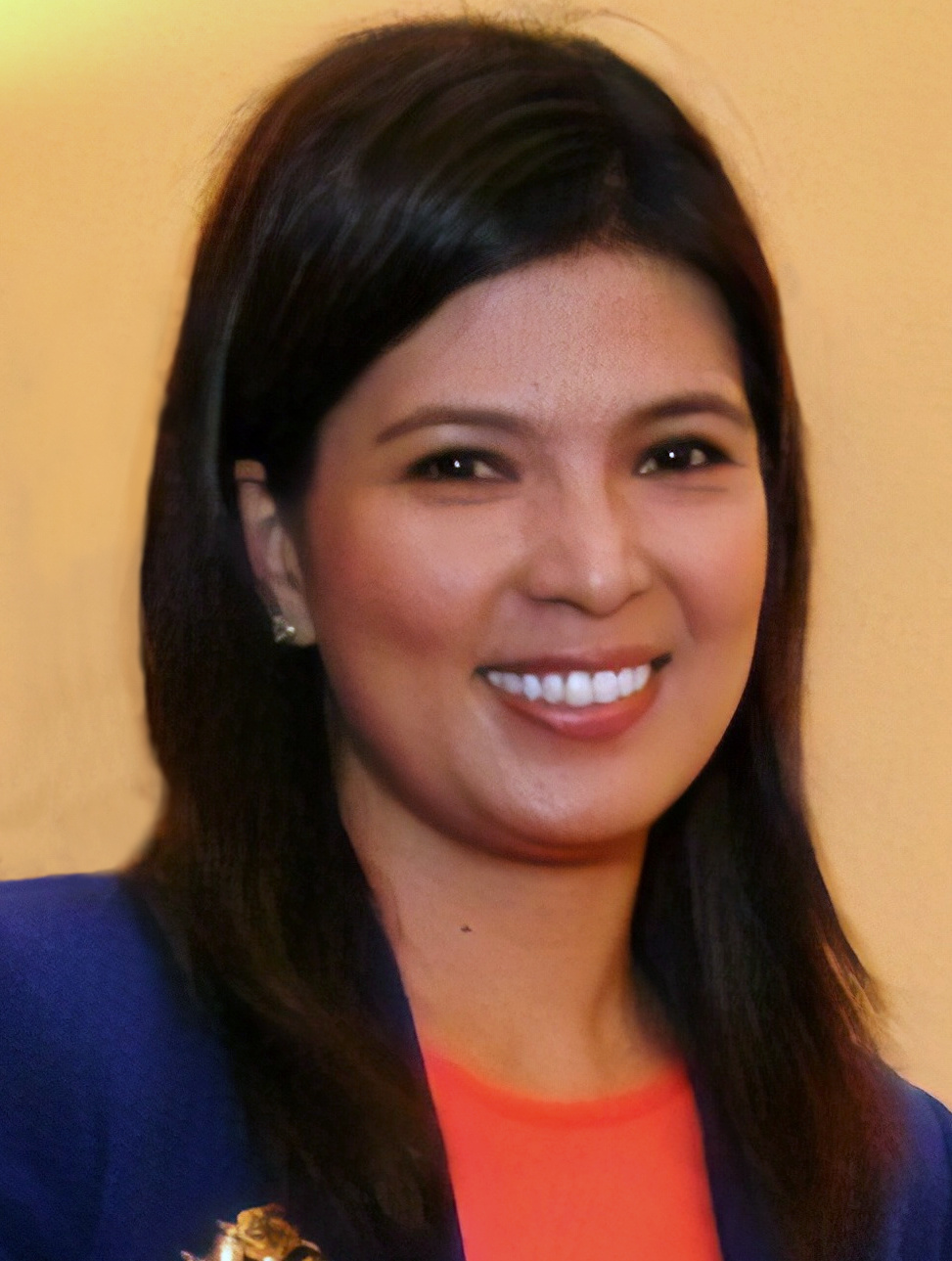
Lani Mercado

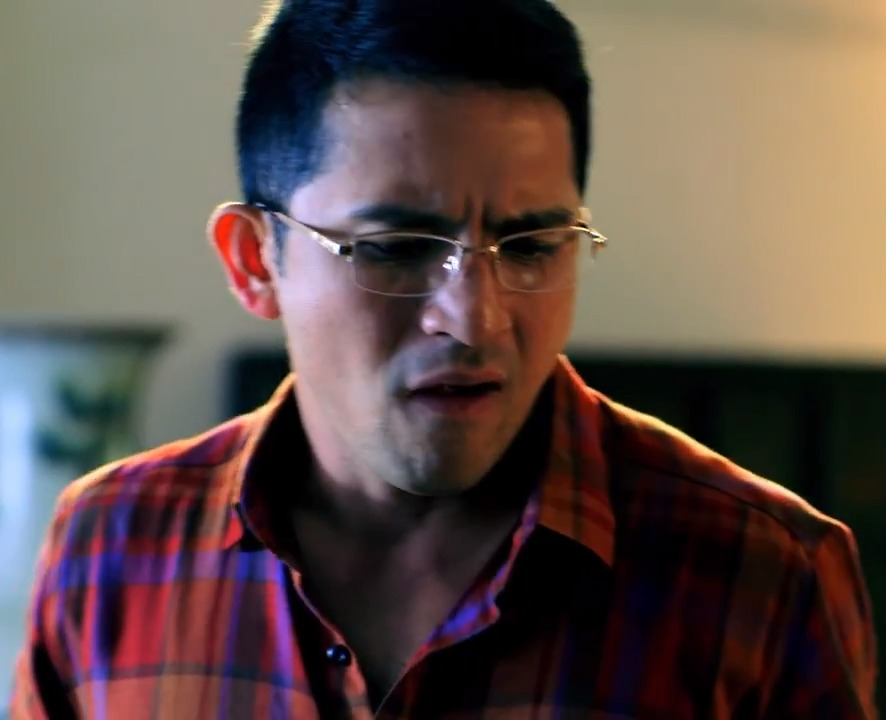
Dennis Trillo

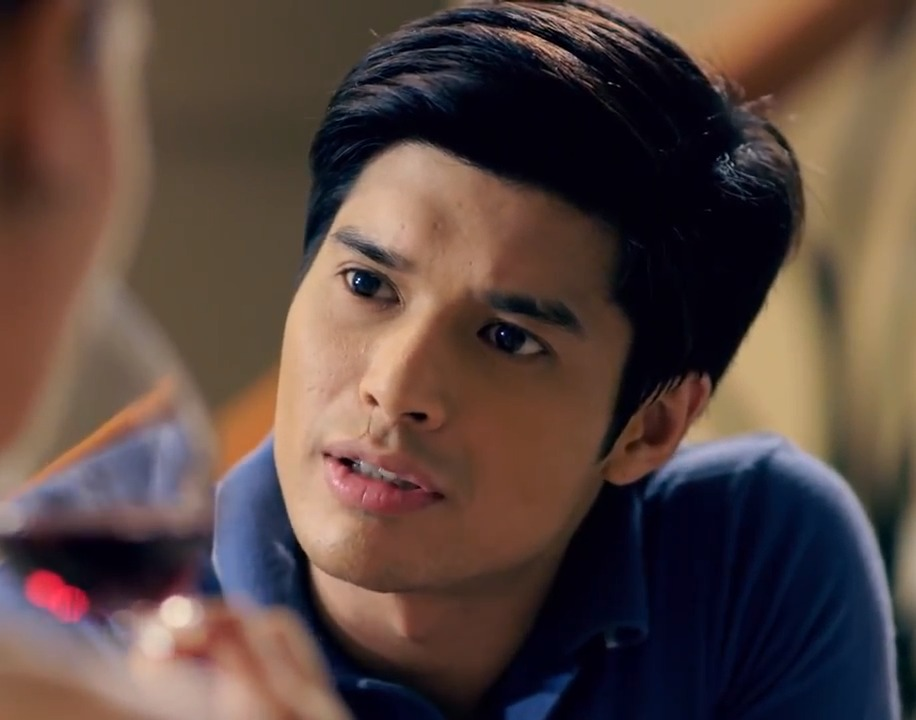
JC de Vera

Lead cast

- Christopher de Leon as Armando
- Lani Mercado as Olivia
- Tanya Garcia as Sophia
- Sunshine Dizon as Erika
- Dennis Trillo as Danilo

Supporting cast

- JC de Vera as Julius
- Pauleen Luna as Clarissa / Cristina
- Polo Ravales as Pablo

Recurring cast

- Bella Flores as Consuelo
- Daniel Fernando as Ariel
- Juan Rodrigo as Ricardo
- Mon Confiado as Edwin
- Ynez Veneracion as Rhoda
- Odette Khan as Minerva
- Jeffrey Santos as Egay
- Tony Mabesa as Blanco
- Rich Vergara as Greg
- Ella Guevara as Jane
- Czarina de Leon as Monette

Guest cast

- Joyce Ching as younger Erika
