= Anak ni Baby Ama =

1991 action film by Deo Fajardo Jr.

- Official movie poster
- Directed by: Deo Fajardo Jr.
- Written by: Deo Fajardo Jr.
- Produced by: William C. Leary
- Starring: Robin Padilla
- Cinematography: Edmund Cupcupin
- Edited by: Renato de Leon
- Music by: Rey Valera
- Production company: Viva Films
- Distributed by: Viva Films
- Release date: 28 November 1990
- Running time: 102 minutes
- Country: Philippines
- Language: Filipino

Anak ni Baby Ama (English: The Son of Baby Ama) is a 1990 Philippine action film written and directed by Deo Fajardo Jr. The film stars Robin Padilla in the title role.

While the film, produced and distributed by Viva Films, was not chosen as one of the final entries to the 1990 Metro Manila Film Festival, it was early theatrically released on November 28, 1990. A sequel, Hari ng Selda: Anak ni Baby Ama 2', was released in 2002, where Padilla reprised his role.

== Plot ==
Anghel is a troubled, carefree young man who grew up under the care of Ramon, a crime lord well-respected in their territory. He crosses paths with Anne, a young woman who comes from a well-to-do family. With their first meeting a disaster due to the constant bullying of Anne's brother, Neil, and his gang, Anne makes it up to Anghel by bringing him to their family resthouse and teaching him the basics of self-defense. Soon after, they fell in love, much to the consternation of Annie's parents and Neil.

When Anne turned 18, Anghel was invited but was treated badly at the party. In retaliation, he ruined the party and was sent to jail. While in jail, it was discovered he got Annie pregnant but lost the baby due to the decision of Anne's family that she get a forced abortion. Soon after he was released from prison with help from Cora, he and Neil's group came into blows again at Ramon's territory, but were saved with the help of Junior Bahala. As punishment, Neil and his gang were subject to humiliation by going naked in the streets, but Neil, being Anne's brother, was spared upon request by Anghel.

Another problem soon compounded Anghel when a drug lord named Johnny Roa infiltrated Ramon's territory. Johnny was able to sell drugs in that territory and won the loyalty of some of Ramon's men. Soon after, Anghel's mother shows up and reveals to Anghel that he is the son of the celebrated criminal Baby Ama. Ramon was able to confess to Anghel how he and Baby Ama became close in prison, but their conversation was cut short when they were informed that Johnny's men were coming to their place for a war. Anghel shaves his head bald as his response to the revelation that forever changed him, but lost his foster father Ramon in that war. It was revealed that it was Ramon's close associate, Boy Dugas, who betrayed the group, and as retaliation, Anghel kills him mercilessly.

Anne, on the other hand, was fooled by Mark, one of Neil's gang inviting her to a supposed meet-up with her and Neil's common friends. She was later drugged, gang-raped, and killed. Later, Neil finds out what happened to her sister and seeks Anghel's help to get revenge. Devastated by Annie's death and the ordeal she went through, Anghel made peace with Neil and teamed up to eliminate Anne's killers/rapists one by one. Anghel later found out that Neil's former gang members bought drugs from Johnny Roa, the same guy who masterminded the killing of his foster father, Ramon. After all of Anne's rapists were killed, Anghel proceeds to Johnny's hideout to eliminate the syndicate by himself.

Anghel attended Anne's funeral upon the invitation of Anne's surviving family members, including Neil. At the funeral, the authorities presented a warrant of arrest to Anghel, to which he surrendered. As he leaves the cemetery, he sees Cora, who hugs him one last time before entering the prison, much to the delight of other prisoners chanting his real father, Baby Ama's name.

== Cast ==
- Robin Padilla as Anghel, the titular "son of Baby Ama"
- Eddie Rodriguez as Ramon, the leader of the crime syndicate, whom Anghel worked for
- Amy Perez as Anne Lardizabal, Anghel's girlfriend
- Ilonah Jean as Cora
- Allan Paule as Mark, one of the people who drugged and raped Anne to her death
- Bembol Roco as Junior Bahala
- Gina Pareño as Anghel's Mother
- Gino Antonio as Neil Lardizabal, Anne's brother
- Rosemarie Gil as Mrs. Lardizabal, Anne and Neil's mother
- Romeo Rivera as Mr. Lardizabal, Anne and Neil's father
- Subas Herrero as Johnny Roa, a notorious drug lord
- Romy Diaz as Larry
- Dick Israel as Boy Dugas, one of Ramon's close associates who later betrayed him
- Eva Darren as Aida
- Val Iglesias as Victor
- Jordan Castillo as Julio
- Manjo Del Mundo as Cora's Lover

== Production ==
The film was supposed to be part of the 1990 Metro Manila Film Festival but was not chosen as part of the six entries.

=== Filming ===
To create a unique effect, lead star Robin Padilla rode a motorcycle in the chase scene, rather than a car. He used it again on the scene where he destroyed the debut cake for Amy Perez's character.
