= Kulimlim =

2004 Filipino horror film

- Directed by: Maryo J. de los Reyes
- Written by: Roy Iglesias
- Produced by: Vic del Rosario Jr.
- Starring: Robin Padilla
- Cinematography: Odyssey "Odie" Flores
- Edited by: Jess Navarro
- Music by: Gardy Labad
- Distributed by: Viva Films
- Release date: June 23, 2004
- Running time: 135 minutes
- Country: Philippines
- Language: Filipino

Kulimlim is a 2004 Philippine horror film directed by Maryo J. de los Reyes. Actor Robin Padilla said that the portrayal of his character Jake Cabrera was challenging since he has to portray five personalities: Jake Cabrera, the three ex-convicts and the demon formed by their souls.

== Plot ==
Based on a technicality, the Supreme Court orders the release of the three Satanic men convicted of raping Jake Cabrera's wife Hannah (Tanya Garcia) after eight years in prison. Jake decides to render his own brand of justice. However, the souls of the three convicts possess him, causing harm to his family. His family tries to escape from him and find a way to exorcise the demons.

== Cast ==
- Robin Padilla as Jake Cabrera
- Tanya Garcia as Hannah Cabrera
- Ronalissa Cheng as Sol Cabrera
- Joshua Dionisio as Dwight Cabrera
- Ryan Eigenmann as ex-convict
- Jhong Hilario as ex-convict
- Omar of the group Masculados as ex-convict
- Marky Lopez
