= 2½ Daddies =

- Title card
- Genre: Sitcom
- Created by: TV5 Entertainment Group
- Developed by: Jana Manalaysay
- Written by: Renato Custodio, Jr.; Volta delos Santos; Elle Ortiz Luis; Jun Hidalgo
- Directed by: Monti Puno Parungao
- Starring: Robin Padilla; BB Gandanghari; Rommel Padilla
- Country of origin: Philippines
- Original language: Tagalog
- No. of seasons: 2
- No. of episodes: 24

Production
- Executive producer: Nanette Villatura-Gamboa
- Producer: Bong Guillermo
- Running time: 60 minutes (1 hour)
- Production company: RCP Productions

Original release
- Network: TV5
- Release: January 24 – July 4, 2015

2 1/2 Daddies is a Philippine television sitcom series broadcast by TV5. Directed by Monti Puno Parungao, it stars Robin Padilla, Rommel Padilla and BB Gandanghari. It aired from January 24 to July 4, 2015.

== Cast and characters ==
=== Main cast ===
- Robin Padilla as Apostol "Apol" Pastoran
- BB Gandanghari as Evangelio "Eva" Pastoran
- Rommel Padilla as Versiculo "Ver" Pastoran

=== Supporting cast ===
- Celia Rodriguez as Mommy Vi
- Alice Dixson as Kate
- Francine Prieto as Mrs. Kurosawa
- Dennis Padilla as Coco
- Alberto Bruno as Macoy
- Raniaah Padilla as Baby

=== Special guests ===
- Cacai Bautista
- Ritz Azul
- Bentong

== International broadcast ==
- In the United States, the drama airs in the Los Angeles market free, over-the-air on LA 18 KSCI-TV (channel 18), Mon-Fri 3:00PM, beginning March 1, 2016.
- In Hawaii it airs on KIKU-TV (Oceanic channel 9, Maui 10, Digital channel 89, DirecTV or DISH Network) from Monday-Friday 2-2:30PM beginning August 5, 2016.
