= Sa Ngalan ng Ama, Ina at mga Anak =

- Theatrical movie poster
- Directed by: Eriberto 'Jon' H. Villarin Jr.
- Screenplay by: Robinhood C. Padilla; Ex Vallez; Keiko Aquino
- Story by: Eriberto 'Jon' H. Villarin Jr.; Robinhood C. Padilla
- Produced by: Robinhood C. Padilla; Mariel Rodriguez Padilla
- Starring: Robin Padilla
- Cinematography: Journalie Payonan
- Edited by: Stephen Pangilinan
- Music by: Joaquin Acosta
- Production company: RCP Productions
- Distributed by: ABS-CBN Film Productions (Note: Distributed under the joint label, Star Cinema/ABS-CBN Film Productions. As of recent, Viva Films acquired the rights of the movie.)
- Release date: January 29, 2014
- Running time: 95 minutes
- Country: Philippines
- Language: Filipino
- Box office: ₱1,280,012.38

Sa Ngalan ng Ama, Ina at mga Anak (Filipino: In the Name of the Father, Mother, and Children) is a 2014 Philippine action film featuring the Padilla family. The film was on the shortlist to show at the 2013 Metro Manila Film Festival.

== Synopsis ==
Set in the turbulent 1970s, the movie is about Octavio "Ongkoy" Parojinog, a former leader of the reputable anti-communist vigilante group Kuratong Baleleng. Regarded as the “Robinhood” of Ozamiz in Mindanao, his strong views on family and patriotism remains to be the stuff of legend in Filipino culture up to the present times.

== Cast ==
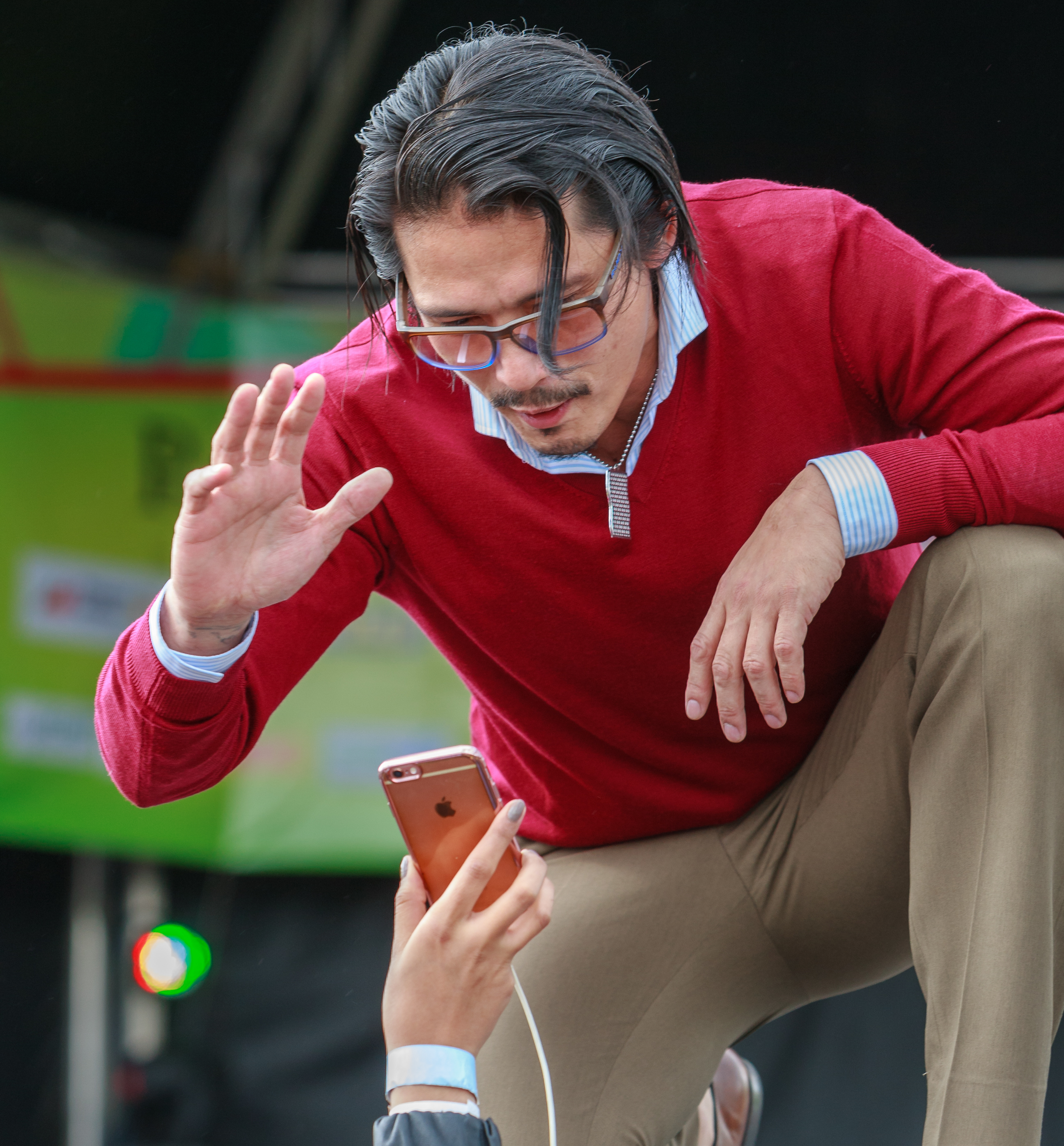
Robin Padilla portrays Ongkoy.

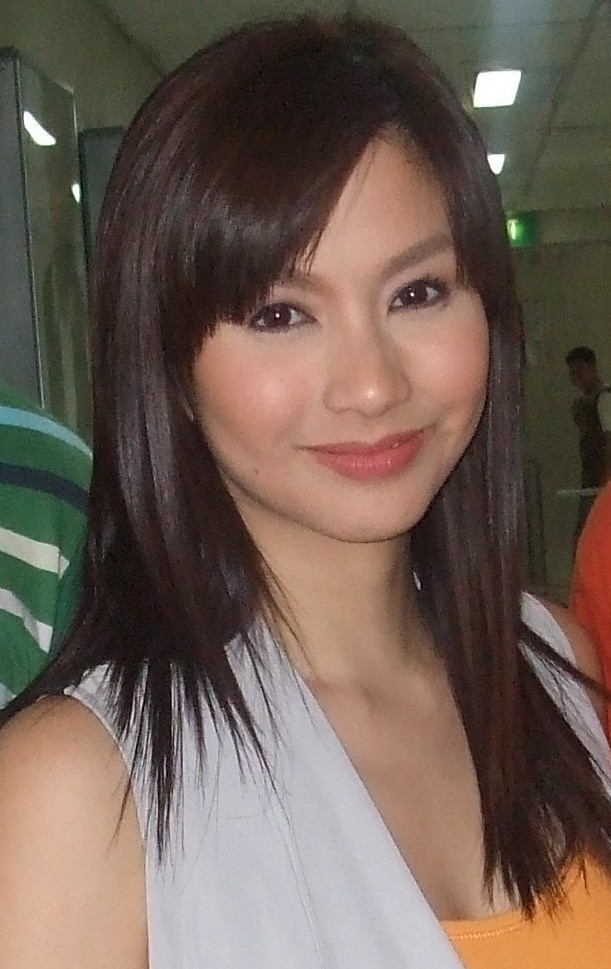
Mariel Rodriguez-Padilla portrays Indah.

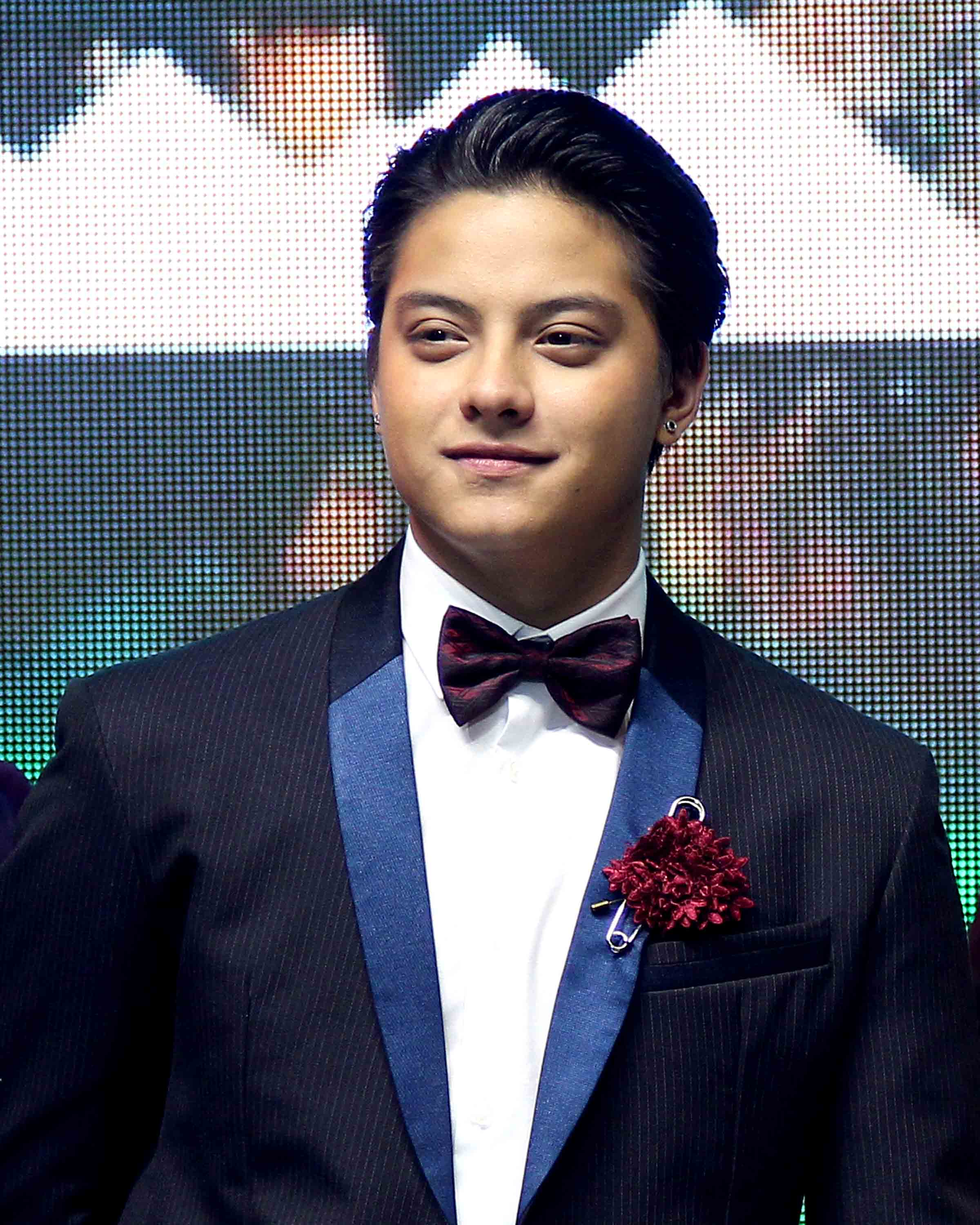
Daniel Padilla portrays Nato.

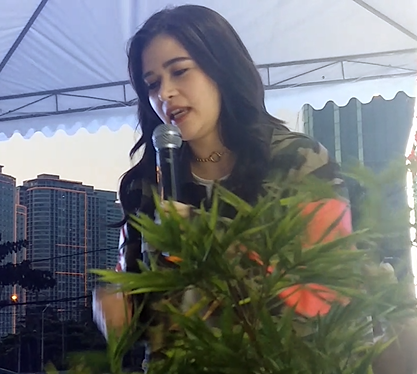
Bela Padilla portrays Damian.

- Robin Padilla as Octavio "Ongkoy" Parojinog
- Daniel Padilla as Renato "Nato" Parojinog
- Mariel Rodriguez-Padilla as Rosalinda "Indah" Parojinog
- Kylie Padilla as Ka Anna
- RJ Padilla as Ricardo "Ardot" Parojinog
- Bela Padilla as Damian
- Matt Padilla as Reynaldo "Aldong" Parojinog Sr.
- Rommel Padilla as Old Nato
- Gideon Padilla as Dagul
- Queenie Padilla as Celia
- Royette Padilla as Boyet Baliw

=== Special Participation ===
- Christopher de Leon as Ka Romeo
- Dina Bonnevie as Old Indah
- Karla Estrada as Erning Wife
- Pen Medina as Erning
- Lito Pimentel as Major Calaang
- Dennis Padilla as Wason
- Bugoy Cariño as Young Ongkoy
- Cha-Cha Cañete as Young Indah
- Jao Mapa as Ongkoy's Assassin 1
- Christian Vasquez as Ongkoy's Assassin 2
- Minco Fabregas as Ongkoy's Assassin 3
- Aljur Abrenica as Ka Dario/Baste
- Ronnie Lazaro as Amadong Buwang
- Sylvia Sanchez as Ka Julieta
- Ketchup Eusebio as NPA Rebels
- John Wayne Sace as Ka Jose Manalo
- Joko Diaz as PNP Leader
- Romnick Sarmenta as Chavit Singson
- Val Iglesias as Roman
