= Robin Padilla =

Senator of the Philippines since 2022 and actor (born 1969)

Robinhood Padilla
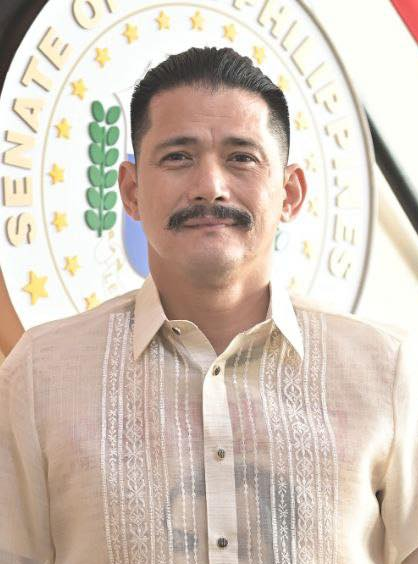
- Portrait, 2023

Senator of the Philippines
- Incumbent
- Assumed office June 30, 2022
Senate committee positions
Chair of the Senate Constitutional Amendments and Revision of Codes Committee
In office July 25, 2022 – August 12, 2025
Preceded by	Francis Pangilinan
Succeeded by	Francis Pangilinan
Chair of the Senate Cultural Communities and Muslim Affairs Committee
Incumbent
Assumed office July 25, 2022
Preceded by	Imee Marcos (as Chair of the Committee on Cultural Communities)
Chair of the Senate Public Information and Mass Media Committee
Incumbent
Assumed office July 25, 2022
Preceded by	Bong Revilla

President of the Partido Demokratiko Pilipino
- In office July 24, 2024 – April 11, 2026
- Preceded by: Jose Alvarez
- Succeeded by: Sebastian Duterte

Personal details
- Born: Robinhood Ferdinand Cariño Padilla; November 23, 1969 (age 56) Daet, Camarines Norte, Philippines
- Party: PDP–Laban (since 2021)
- Other political affiliations: Independent (until 2021)
- Spouses: Liezl Sicangco (m. 1996; div. 2007); Mariel Rodriguez (m. 2010)
- Relations: Padilla family Bela Padilla (first cousin once removed)
- Children: 7, including Kylie
- Parents: Casimero "Roy" Padilla Sr.; Lolita "Eva" Cariño
- Education: Philippine College of Criminology (BS)
- Occupation: Actor; politician
- Nickname(s): Abdul Aziz (عبد العزيز) (Muslim name); Binoe/Binoy

Military service
- Allegiance: Philippines
- Branch/service: Philippine Army
- Years of service: 2020–present
- Rank: Lieutenant Colonel

Robinhood Ferdinand "Robin" Cariño Padilla ([kaˈɾiɲo paˈdilja]; born November 23, 1969), also Abdul Aziz, is a Filipino actor and politician serving as senator of the Philippines since 2022. Known for his action films, he portrayed gangster roles in Anak ni Baby Ama (1990), Bad Boy (1990), and Bad Boy II (1992), among others. Born to a political family, Padilla began his acting career as a teenager. He admitted that he was a communist rebel against the Philippine government, and has been supportive of Communist Party of the Philippines founder, Jose Maria Sison.

Padilla is a self-affirmed loyalist of former president Rodrigo Duterte and an admirer of former president Ferdinand Marcos, both of which have well-documented histories of corruption, censorship, and human rights violations. Padilla adheres to the policies espoused by Duterte under Dutertismo, including pro-China positions where he defended Chinese president Xi Jinping, leading to him being tagged as a Tsinador (Chinese senator). He is also a proponent of the legalization of medical marijuana, with help from Israel officials, and a primary defender of child sex trafficker and Duterte ally Apollo Quiboloy.

He was appointed by the Duterte-aligned party, Partido Demokratiko Pilipino, as their president in 2024 until he took a leave in 2025. He is against the impeachment trial of vice president Sara Duterte.

Padilla is known for his past illegal activities, including his imprisonment in 1995 for illegal ownership of firearms and ammunitions related to a reckless driving resulting to injury case. Padilla became a fugitive for a time, but was re-arrested. He converted to Islam while in prison, and was pardoned by both presidents Fidel V. Ramos in 1998, and Duterte in 2016, both of which he campaigned for in their presidential bids. Padilla was elected to the Senate in the 2022 elections under Duterte's patronage.

He is currently facing an obstruction of justice case for assisting fugitive Ronald dela Rosa in his 2026 escape from an International Criminal Court arrest warrant for crimes against humanity.

== Early life and education ==
Robinhood Ferdinand Cariño Padilla was born on November 23, 1969, in Daet, Camarines Norte. His father was trade union organizer Casimero "Roy" Padilla Sr. (1926–1988), who was appointed by President Corazon Aquino as governor of Camarines Norte from 1986 until he was assassinated in 1988 during a period where Marcos forces continued to plot a number of coup d'état against the Aquino government and her allies. His mother was Lolita Eva Cariño of Nueva Ecija. He has at least 48 siblings, among whom are half-brothers Roy Jr. (who replaced their father after the assassination), Roberto, Ronaldo, Roger, Ricarte and Rodolfo, half-sisters Rebecca and Carmela, brothers Randy, Randolf, Royette, Romulus, and Rommel, and sisters Rowena, Roda, and Richelda; one of his siblings, BB Gandanghari, is transgender.

=== Fake Ibaloi ancestry ===
His family initially alleged that the Cariño side of the family was Ibaloi. However, geneologists, historians, and indigenous Ibaloi leaders later verified the claim to be false. The Ibaloi community, notably the Cariño Ibalois, denied the claim. To not be disrespectful, some Cariño members of the Ibaloi instead referred to Padilla as an 'honorary cousin' out of hospitality.

=== Education ===
Padilla took his elementary education at Siena College of Quezon City and attended high school at Saint Louis University Boys' High School. During high school, Padilla was into breakdancing with friends. He discontinued his studies when he was 17 to pursue his acting career.

He claimed he finished his coursework in criminology at Philippine College of Criminology (PCCR) in 2001. He never passed the Criminologists Licensure Examination (CLE). In 2022, a few weeks after being elected as senator, for undisclosed reasons, the PCCR gave Padilla a bachelor's diploma in criminology two decades after he allegedly finished his coursework, leading to suspicions about the matter.

In 2026, he publicly stated on record at an impeachment court that he instead learned criminology at a so-called 'University of Prison', alluding to the time where he was jailed for illegal activities in the 1990's.

== Acting career ==
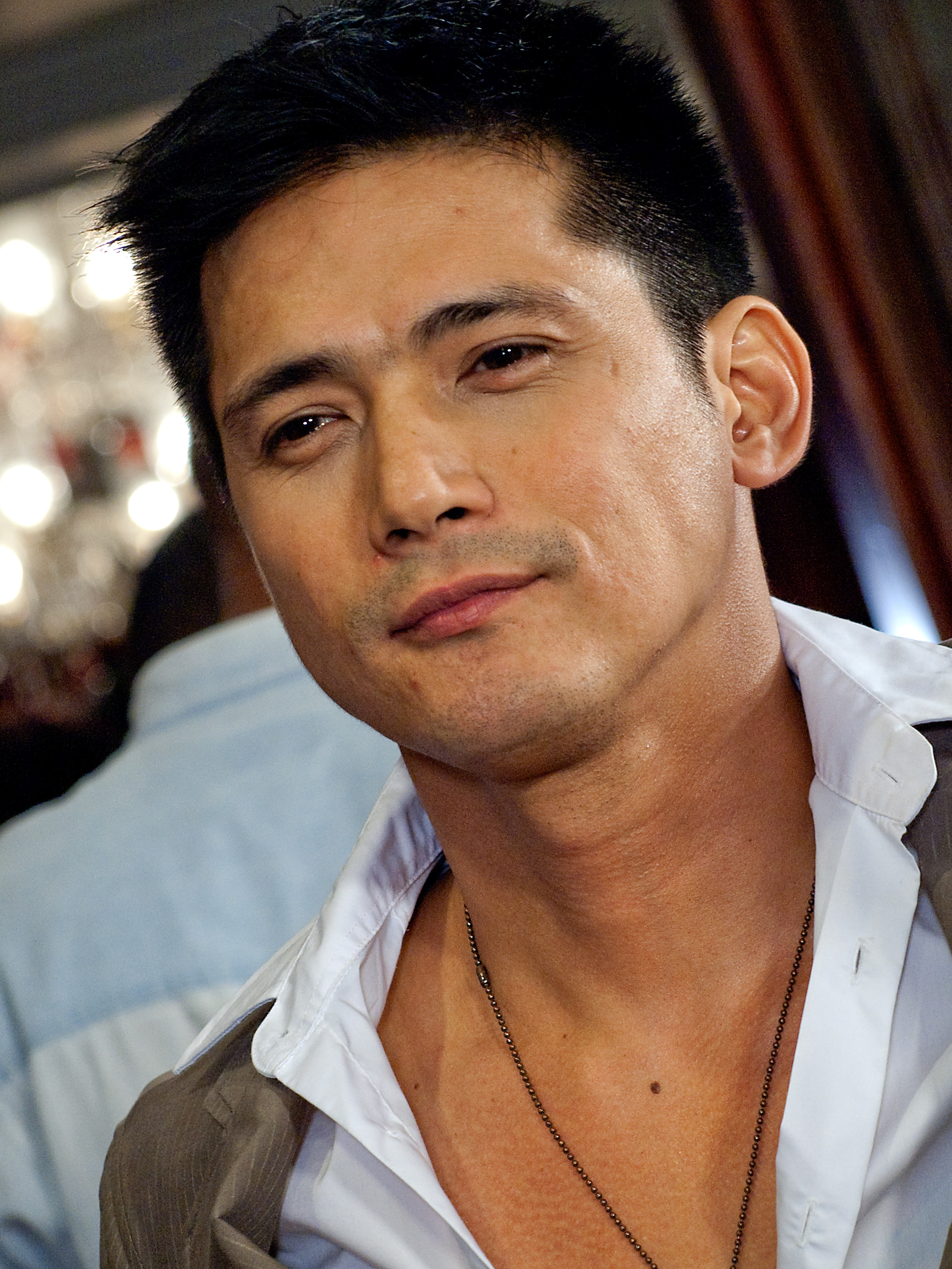
Padilla in 2011

Padilla played his first major role in the 1985 comedy film Public Enemy No. 2: Maraming Number Two starring Eddie Garcia and Nida Blanca. In 1991, Padilla played the lead roles in the films Maging Sino Ka Man and Ang Utol Kong Hoodlum, where a filming accident injured his midsection and upper limbs.

Padilla wrote and starred in the 1996 film Anak, Pagsubok Lamang ng Diyos which was shot almost entirely inside the New Bilibid Prison, where Padilla was imprisoned at the time. After his release, Padilla starred in the 1998 film Tulak ng Bibig, Kabig ng Dibdib where he was again injured.

In 1999, Padilla crossed over to television programs through the ABS-CBN comedy show Pwedeng Pwede. In 2000, Padilla starred alongside singer Regine Velasquez in the romantic comedy Kailangan Ko'y Ikaw. In 2002, he reprised his role as Anghel in the film Hari ng Selda: Anak ni Baby Ama 2. The following year, he top-billed his first primetime action-drama series, Basta't Kasama Kita. In 2005, he did two films: the horror thriller Kulimlim and the comedy La Visa Loca. He won the award for Best Actor in the 2006 Gawad Urian Awards, where he was called "Prince of Action".

He transitioned to GMA Network afterwards, taking on a prominent role in the 2007 TV series Asian Treasures along with Angel Locsin. Additionally, Padilla inked a two-film deal with GMA Films, featuring in Till I Met You and the 2009 horror-suspense film Sundo in collaboration with Viva Films. Subsequently, Padilla chose not to renew his exclusive contract, allowing him the flexibility to work on films for various production outfits, including Star Cinema Productions, FLT Films, Millennium Cinema, and GMA Films. During the same period, he portrayed the titular characters in the television series Joaquin Bordado and Totoy Bato, both of which are based on comic book characters created by Carlo J. Caparas.

In 2010, Padilla returned to ABS-CBN. His projects with the network included the 2011 sitcom Toda Max. In 2011, Padilla directed his first TV commercial under his own production company, RCP Productions. In 2013, Padilla returned to GMA Network, where he featured in a cameo role in Adarna alongside his daughter Kylie Padilla. He also played the lead role in the 2013 action thriller 10,000 Hours under Viva Films, winning the Best Actor award in the 39th Metro Manila Film Festival and Actor of the Year in the 2014 Box Office Entertainment Awards.

On December 1, 2015, he returned to ABS-CBN and was one of the judges for the fifth season of talent competition show Pilipinas Got Talent. He was also one of the judges in the succeeding season in 2018. His stint as a PGT judge had multiple controversies including xenophobic and racist statements. In a 2017 talk show interview, he loudly shouted that he wanted sex. In December 2025, Padilla signed a contract with Viva Communications to star in the third installment of the Bad Boy film series from the 1990s.

== Communist and military career ==
Flag of the Communist Party of the Philippines, which Padilla admitted he adhered to. Padilla supports CPP founder Jose Maria Sison and is known for his pro-China positions and friendly ties with Chinese officials of the Chinese Communist Party

In 2020, Padilla joined the military and became a reserve officer in the Armed Forces of the Philippines with the rank of captain with the help of the Duterte administration. On July 30, 2020, he was elected by the Army's Multi-Sectoral Advisory Board as its new Strategic Communication Committee chairperson. In December 2021, Padilla and other reservists running in the 2022 elections were relieved of their posts "to ensure the organization's non-partisanship". The Army clarified this did not relieve Padilla of being in the reserve force. In March 2024, Padilla held the rank of reserve Lieutenant Colonel.

In 2026, Padilla admitted that he became a communist rebel, stating "Komunista po ako" (I am a communist) on record during a court trial he attended. Padilla met with exiled Communist Party of the Philippines founder Jose Maria Sison in the Netherlands in June 2017. After criticism, Padilla later retracted his statement and 'clarified' that his statement referred to his alleged philosophical support only, not actual rebellion against the government. However, it was later revealed by philanthropist Angel Locsin that Padilla before admitted to her that he indeed lived in the mountains for a time as a rebel. Locsin stated "Nung mga panahong magkasama tayo, madalas mong ikuwento 'yung panahon na namundok ka at nag-armas." (Back then, you would often tell stories about the time you went to the mountains and took up arms). Padilla has stated that he is ready to be stripped from his military reservist position.

Padilla has also been known to meet various members of the Chinese Communist Party, including controversial Chinese ambassador Jing Quan who he praised after the ambassador threatened Filipino officials and attacked the legal rights of the Philippines.

== Political career ==
Padilla, who was convicted and imprisoned for illegal activities such as illegal possession of firearms and reckless driving resulting to injury, ran and lost in the 1995 elections for Vice Governor of Nueva Ecija. He controversially arrived at the Commission on Elections (COMELEC) assisted by armed bodyguards to file his certificate of candidacy (COC), which was illegal under the Omnibus Election Code. Lakas–NUCD–UMDP endorsed him along with governor-candidate Virginia Perez–Custodio. Both lost against the candidates of NPC–BALANE. After losing, Padilla tried to evade re-arrest and became a fugitive, going back and forth Metro Manila and Camarines Norte. He was convicted in his case on April 25, 1994, which also barred him from running in any elective office. He was later caught and imprisoned again on August 1995.

On October 8, 2021, Padilla filed his COC for senator under PDP–Laban for the 2022 election, after President Duterte pardoned him in full for the many illegal activities he committed, allowing Padilla to seek elective office. Padilla campaigned on a platform in favor of the policies of the Duterte administration, notably the drug war which killed 30,000 Filipinos, many of which were not involved in drugs, and tax incentive for foreigners such as the Chinese. He encouraged Overseas Filipino Workers to go back home. Duterte heavily endorsed Padilla, who won a seat in the Senate, topping the vote count in the 2022 senatorial elections. He attributed his victory to his federalism promise and being Muslim. He later hired Duterte allies to be his employees in the Senate.

=== Senate of the Philippines (2022–present) ===
In the 19th Congress, he voted to elect Migz Zubiri as Senate President in July 2022, becoming part of the majority bloc. He, however, abstained in the election of Joel Villanueva as Senate Majority Leader. Padilla was elected as chairman for the Senate's committees on constitutional amendments and cultural communities. He filed bills concerning medical marijuana, usage of language, excise tax suspension, civil service eligibility despite not being CSE eligible himself, regionalization of prisons, mandatory ROTC, divorce, federalism, nursing homes, civil union, movie and television workers, among others. He also filed a bill in favor of a joint exploration of the West Philippine Sea with China, currently controlled by the Chinese Communist Party Padilla stated he will investigate a 2007 monetary dispute sought by the Aeta people, however, no investigation occurred in the end.

Padilla met Israeli officials and sought the assistance of Israel regarding his proposal to legalize medical marijuana in the Philippines. Padilla favors charter change, although no progress on 'cha-cha' has occurred under his chairmanship of the committee on constitutional amendments.

Padilla has stated that he is against 'fake news', although he publicly supports the policies of the previous Duterte administration, where Duterte admitted before that he utilizes troll farms to spread fake news and attack critics. Many of these troll farms are based in mainland China. Padilla, on numerous occasions, has also spread fake news. He previously claimed that he has Ibaloi blood, which has been debunked. He also claimed that he comes from a variety of provinces and even Spain, which has been debunked. Padilla also repeated numerous times that the juvenile justice law grants minors 'absolute criminal immunity' without consequences, which has since been tagged as fake and misleading and has contributed to minors conducting illegal activities thinking there won't be consequences for their actions. In 2026, Padilla's wife, Mariel Rodriguez, claimed that Padilla authored a law before he was ever elected as senator. The claim has since been debunked.

He has also backed the re-imposition of mandatory Reserve Officers' Training Corps (ROTC) training, which is still pending. On July 24, 2025, Padilla took his oath as president of the Partido Demokratiko Pilipino (PDP) party. He filed a bill for the proper burial of Muslims. He has also filed a bill that sought to legalize same-sex civil unions, which was criticized by the Marawi Grand Imam who withdrew support for Padilla. Padilla was also caught on video eating pork barbeque, with some criticizing him for being Muslim only when convenient.

Padilla filed the Eddie Garcia Law which outlined safety measures and other benefits for entertainment industry workers. The barangay health workers law was co-filed by Padilla and enacted into law after the sponsorship of senator Risa Hontiveros. He also filed a bill for priority development projects of local government units, similar to the bill first filed by senator Panfilo Lacson.

==== Obstruction of justice case ====
On May 14, 2026, Padilla assisted Ronald dela Rosa to evade the International Criminal Court arrest warrant for crimes against humanity being served by law enforement agencies. Dela Rosa allegedly rode on Padilla's Toyota Fortuner after a three-day standoff at the Senate. The National Bureau of Investigation deemed Padilla as a person of interest. Padilla later admitted to leaving the Senate with dela Rosa while rejecting the term "escape". Padilla claimed he was only 'driving' the fugitive to Makati where dela Rosa was picked up by another vehicle.

An obstruction of justice complaint was filed against Padilla at the Ombudsman of the Philippines. Official investigations by the CIDG later concluded that the transport of Dela Rosa was not a mere hitch ride on Padilla’s car, but a "highly coordinated, pre-planned logistical maneuver specifically executed to avoid detection while escaping the Senate premises in the dawn of May 14, 2026". Additionally, the investigation found that another vehicle tailing the car of Padilla "served as a security escort and backup car during the maneuver.”

== Political positions ==
Although Padilla is a Muslim, he has also identified himself as a 'communist', declaring in court 'Komunista po ako' (I am a communist). After criticism, Padilla later 'clarified' that he was referring to philosophical support only, not actual rebellion. However, it was revealed that Padilla recounted before to philanthropist Angel Locsin that Padilla, for a time, was a communist rebel in the mountains who took up arms against the government. In June 2017, he visited the Netherlands and met with Jose Maria Sison, the exiled founder of the Communist Party of the Philippines.

Padilla has made statements that openly favors China, which is currently administered by the Chinese Communist Party. He has been referred as a Tsinador (Chinese senator) by critics for his pro-China stances. He was also criticized for being a "bad boy sa pelikula, maamong Tsinador sa totoong buhay" (bad boy only in movies, but a meek Chinese senator in real life). He openly defended and praised Chinese ambassador Jing Quan who publicly mocked and attacked the Philippines. Padilla supports the 'Duterte China policy', where former president Duterte previously called the South China Sea Arbitration victory of the Philippines against China as a 'piece of paper' he will throw as trash.

Padilla supports political censorship on streaming platforms, similar to Ferdinand Marcos' 1979 ban of Voltes V. He also expressed support for martial law, and admires Rodrigo Duterte and Ferdinand Marcos, both of which have well-documented histories of corruption, censorship, and human rights violations.

=== On Apollo Quiboloy and sex trafficking ===
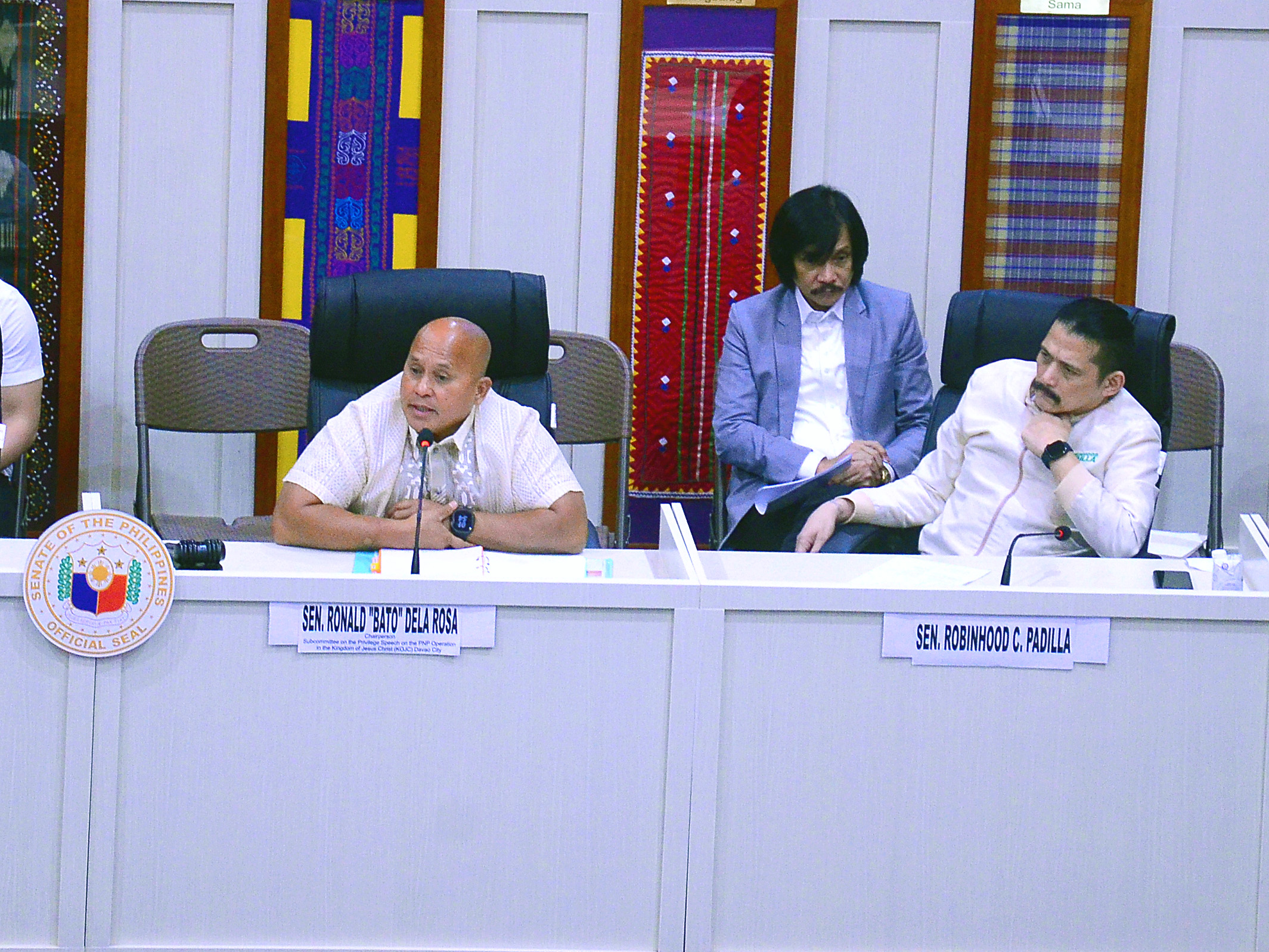
Senators Padilla (right) and Ronald dela Rosa (left) during a public hearing, defending human child sex trafficker and Duterte-ally Apollo Quiboloy.

Padilla has spoken against sexual harassment victimizing Filipinos before, however, he continues to openly support the Kingdom of Jesus Christ (KOJC) cult and its leader and founder Apollo Quiboloy, who is accused by multiple child victims and the FBI for human sex trafficking. Padilla stated that investigating Duterte-ally Quiboloy and his cult was 'unnecessary'. He disputes the hearings and only attended a Senate investigation meeting about the matter to defend Quiboloy. He blamed the victims and told them to reveal their full identities, including the child victims. Padilla considers Quiboloy a 'hero'. After criticism, Padilla later denied 'defending' Quiboloy. Padilla, along with senators Imee Marcos, Cynthia Villar and Bong Go failed in their attempt to block the contempt order imposed on Quiboloy by the Senate panel led by senator Risa Hontiveros.

Padilla also previously remarked that husbands have 'sexual rights' over their wives. After criticism, Padilla stated his statement was only 'hypothetical'.

=== Calling the youth of today as weak ===
On February 11, 2026, during a Senate committee hearing about possible regulations on online spaces (particularly social media), Padilla brought up that according to the World Health Organization Regional Office in Europe, about one in six school-aged children are being cyberbullied. Padilla then notes how children of the modern generation are weak compared to his generation and how "now, [even] small children say 'I'm depressed'". This remark was criticized by various individuals and groups. In May 2026, after a fellow senator 'shouted' at Padilla in the Senate during a live debate, Padilla became teary-eyed and said he will file an ethics complaint while demanding an apology.

=== Impeachment of Sara Duterte ===
You know, your answer is very good. [I just] hope our prosecution is not one-sided[...]

— Padilla's response to House prosecutor Gerville Luistro's answer to his inquiry during the impeachment trial of Sara Duterte, July 2026

Robin Padilla has opposed the removal of vice president Sara Duterte in response to her first impeachment. He has signalled his loyalty to the Duterte family stating that should he be "burned", he will "smell like Rodrigo Roa Duterte". In the second impeachment trial, Padilla made controversial remarks on record at the impeachment court. Padilla admitted "Komunista po ako" (I am a communist), which was irrelevant to the case. He also stated conflicting and false remarks of where he came from, all of which were irrelevant to the impeachment case. He falsely stated that he was from Baguio, alluding to his fake blood connections to the Ibaloi people. He also stated that he was from Plaridel (Bulacan), Pangasinan, La Union, Abra, Camarines Norte, and Nueva Ecija. In reality, records show that Padilla was born in Camarines Norte. In a separate interview, he doubled down and then also falsely claimed he was from Spain.

=== Tsinador and Pro-China positions ===
Before becoming a senator, Padilla visited Pagasa Island in 2021, while praising the military outpost. After being elected in 2022, Padilla changed stances, pushing for negotiations with China. He has also made doubtful statement on the Philippines-United States Mutual Defense Treaty. Padilla is openly against any caricatures made by Filipinos against Chinese president Xi Jinping.

Padilla has been referred as a Tsinador (Chinese senator) by critics for his pro-China political positions. He was also criticized for being a "bad boy sa pelikula, maamong Tsinador sa totoong buhay" (bad boy only in movies, but a meek Chinese senator in real life).

Padilla was one of the seven so-called Tsinadors who did not support the Senate resolution condemning China's attacks on Filipino officials. The other senators who did not sign the resolution were Alan Cayetano, Pia Cayetano, Bato dela Rosa, Chiz Escudero, Bong Go, Rodante Marcoleta, Imee Marcos, and Joel Villanueva.

After Chinese ambassador Jing Quan released statements threatening the Philippines and its rights to the West Philippine Sea, as well spreading fake news against Filipino defense and elected officials, Padilla praised Quan who he called as 'educated, a gentleman, and easy to talk with'.

Padilla has also stated that he backs the 'Duterte China policy', where former president Duterte previously called the South China Sea Arbitration victory of the Philippines against China as a 'piece of paper' he will throw as trash. Duterte's daughter, vice president Sara, who is also known for her pro-China statements, has been implicated for receiving through her linked corporation P319 million in remittances from China and another P150 million siphoned as “donation” by the Chinese government to Duterte's Malasakit Foundation as confirmed by the Anti–Money Laundering Council (AMLC). The corporation involved has also been confirmed as linked to the Embassy of China.

== Personal life ==
=== Illegal activities and pardons tied to political endorsements ===
Padilla has previously conducted a variety of illegal activities which led to his imprisonment. He backed the presidential candidacies of two presidential candidates who later won (Ramos in 1992 and Duterte in 2016). Padilla afterwards sought the help of the two to be granted pardon for his illegal activities. Padillas is an ex-convict, having been convicted for two separate crimes, illegal possession of firearms and ammunition and reckless Imprudence resulting in injury in the 1990's. He is currently facing an obstruction of justice complaint at the Ombudsman due to his involvement in a recent case that occurred in the Senate premises in 2026.

During the 1992 presidential election, Padilla campaigned for former defense secretary Fidel V. Ramos, who later won.

On October 26, 1992, Padilla was arrested for sideswiping a 40-year-old balut vendor with his Mitsubishi Pajero van in Angeles City and causing injury. He was arrested for some time and police inspection of the van revealed multiple illegal firearms in his possession, resulting to two separate cases. Padilla admitted to owning eleven illegal high-powered firearms. Three of the firearms (an M-16 rifle, a .357 caliber revolver, and a .38 caliber Beretta pistol) had been given to Padilla on September 29, 1992 by police officer Rodialo Gumtang. Gumtang falsely testified that he issued guns to Padilla for his alleged role as "an undercover agent on a top-secret mission" for the Philippine National Police (PNP). Officials from the PNP denied Padilla's role as an agent. Gumtang was relieved from his position in January 1994 in violation of a PNP Security Command directive, and was later dismissed from service in August 1995.

On July 14, 1993, Padilla was at a house in San Lorenzo Village, Makati with his then live-in partner Liezl Sicangco, when the latter was injured by gunshot, which he said had occurred while he was sleeping; Sicangco's affidavit to the Makati police stated that she was cleaning a cabinet in their room when she accidentally touched a pistol and shot her own right hand. The pistil was an illegal firearm of Padilla. Padilla's brother Rommel testified that the house was allegedly rented under his name and that Robin was out of the country when more illegal firearms were seized from the house by police authorities later on July 23, 1993.

In April 1994, Padilla was convicted by two courts: one by the Angeles City Municipal Trial Court (MTC) for driving with reckless imprudence that caused injury, being sentenced to four months in jail, and the other by the Pampanga Regional Trial Court (RTC) Branch 61 for illegal possession of three firearms under Presidential Decree 1866, being sentenced to a maximum jail term of 21 years. Padilla allegedly slashed his wrists in a suicide attempt after hearing the verdicts. By August 25, 1995, Padilla surrendered to police authorities at Camp Ricardo Papa in Taguig after a month-long manhunt, and was imprisoned at the New Bilibid Prison in Muntinlupa. Immediately after his arrest, Padilla alleged that authorities already knew his location during the manhunt, having been accompanied for a month by PNP Special Action Force escorts prior to his surrender, and revealed his intention to seek the assistance of President Fidel V. Ramos, who he previously campaigned for. In April 1998, after three years in prison, he was granted a conditional pardon by President Ramos.

In 2014, Padilla campaigned for presidential candidate Rodrigo Duterte and in May 2016 filed a libel case against a Twitter user for calling him an "ex-convict". In November 2016, Padilla, who called himself an ex-convict in 2026, was granted an absolute pardon from President Rodrigo Duterte to endow him full civil and political rights, allowing him to run for elections.

In 2026, an obstruction of justice complaint was filed against Padilla at the Ombudsman of the Philippines due to Padilla's major involvement in the escape of senator Ronald dela Rosa from an International Criminal Court arrest warrant for crimes against humanity. Official investigations by the CIDG concluded that the transport of Dela Rosa was not a mere hitch ride on Padilla’s car, but a "highly coordinated, pre-planned logistical maneuver specifically executed to avoid detection while escaping the Senate premises in the dawn of May 14, 2026". Additionally, the investigation found that another vehicle tailing the car of Padilla "served as a security escort and backup car during the maneuver.” Padillas was previously tagged as a person of interest by the National Bureau of Investigation.

=== Relationships and children ===
Padilla has fathered seven children with three women. His eldest child, Camille, was born to actress Leah Orosa in July 1990. He had four children with his first wife Liezl Sicangco: daughters Rozelle Elizabeth ("Queenie", born 1992), Kylie Nicole (born 1993) and Zherileen ("Zhen-Zhen", born 1994), and lone son Robinhood Jr./Ahmad Ali (born 2000). After marrying his second wife, actress Mariel Rodriguez, he had two more daughters: Maria Isabella (born 2016) and Maria Gabriela (born 2019). Rodriguez stated that the name of Padilla's youngest child was based on her claim that Padilla's mother Eva Cariño descended from 18th-century revolutionary Gabriela Silang.

Padilla had dated several other women, including Kris Aquino, the daughter of President Corazon Aquino, who claimed that he had tattooed the names of his previous lovers on his back. On his chest, Padilla tattooed a fist with the name "Sharon" underneath, a reference to his previous relationship with actress Sharon Cuneta which he remarked as "the most painful" past relationship due to her leaving Padilla and marrying Senator Kiko Pangilinan.

In November 2009, Padilla announced that he and Sicangco had divorced in 2007. On August 19, 2010, Padilla and actress Mariel Rodriguez had an interfaith marriage at the Taj Mahal in India. Padilla and Rodriguez had met during his stint as a host of Wowowee. Rodriguez gave birth to their first daughter in November 2016 in Delaware, and a second daughter in November 2019. Despite their marriage, Rodriguez remained a Roman Catholic. In 2017, Padilla became a grandfather when his daughters Queenie and Kylie gave birth.

==== Alleged abandoned wife and child ====
In 2025, a woman online alleged that she and Padilla married in Setagaya, Japan in 1996, the same year Padilla married Sicangco. The alleged wife shared photo evidences in a Facebook group where she is seen with Padilla and their alleged child. Padilla's own mother, Eva Cariño, was also confirmed to be present in the photos.

=== Beliefs ===
Padilla, his mother Eva, and four of his sisters became Jehovah's Witnesses in the mid-1980s. Padilla converted to Islam after meeting Muslim elders in prison, where he was imprisoned for illegal activities he made in the 1990's. He adopted the name Abdul Aziz, and married Sicangco in a Muslim ceremony in early July 1996 while he was still serving his prison sentence. President Ramos, who Padilla campaigned for in the 1992 elections, pardoned Padilla from imprisonment. Padilla afterwards expressed his intent to go on a pilgrimage to Mecca. He unconsciously adheres to religious pluralism for a time in 2002. In 2025, Padilla was caught eating pork barbeque, with some criticizing him for being Muslim only when convenient.

In July 2021, Padilla faced backlash following his comments on his daughter Kylie's separation with husband Aljur Abrenica. Padilla defended Abrenica's cheating, believing that cheating is something natural to men.

=== Advocacies ===
Padilla is a self-described advocate for anti-malaria, where for a short time, he was a spokesperson for using mosquito nets under a Department of Health campaign in 2004. He established the Liwanag ng Kapayapaan Foundation in 2007, for underprivileged pre-school Muslim children in Quezon City. The mini school closed down after Padilla failed to comply with necessary government permits. It reopened in September 2010. In sports, Padilla donated ₱2,500,000 to the Muay Association of the Philippines, where it was later revealed that he was its chairman. A devout Duterte supporter, Padilla supports the deadly and controversial Philippine drug war which killed around 30,000 Filipinos, including civilian children and women not involved in drugs. Padilla has stated that extrajudicial killings in the Duterte drug war were allegedly 'legitimate part' of the government's strategy.

== Electoral history ==
Electoral history of Robin Padilla
Year	Office	Party	Votes received				Result
Year	Office	Party	Total	%	P.	Swing	Result
1995	Vice Governor of Nueva Ecija	IND	209,501	41.98%	2nd	—N/a	Lost
2022	Senator of the Philippines	PDP–Laban	26,612,434	47.91%	1st	—N/a	Won

== Filmography ==
=== Film ===
==== As actor ====
Year	Title	Role	Notes
1985	Public Enemy No. 2: Maraming Number Two		
1986	Bagets Gang	Frankie Reyes	
1988	Alega Gang: Public Enemy No.1 of Cebu	Eddie	
1988	Love Letters		Segment "Till Death Do Us Part"
1988	Sa Likod ng Kasalanan	Omar	
1988	Sgt. Victor Magno: Kumakasa, Kahit Nag-iisa	Brando	
1988	Bala Ko ang Hahatol	Gino	
1988	Patrolman		
1989	Arrest: Pat. Rizal Alih – Zamboanga Massacre		
1989	Eagle Squad	Ptr. Raymond Perez	
1989	Hindi Pahuhuli ng Buhay	Carding Valencia	
1989	Delima Gang	Berto Delima	
1989	Carnap King? (The Randy Padilla Story)	Randolf "Randy" Padilla	Also writer
1990	Sa Diyos Lang Ako Susuko	Romano	
1990	Barumbado	Eric	
1990	Walang Awa Kung Pumatay	Narding	
1990	Bad Boy	Bombo	
1990	Anak ni Baby Ama	Anghel	
1991	Maging Sino Ka Man	Carding Ermita	
1991	Hinukay Ko Na ang Libingan Mo	Elmo/Anton	
1991	Ang Utol Kong Hoodlum	Ben	
1992	Miss Na Miss Kita (Utol Kong Hoodlum II)	Ben	
1992	Grease Gun Gang	Carding Sungkit	
1992	Bad Boy II	Bombo	
1992	Engkanto	Matador	
1993	Gagay: Prinsesa ng Brownout	Cameo role	
1993	Makuha Ka sa Tingin (Kung Puwede Lang)	Elcid	
1993	Manila Boy	Diego/Manila Boy	
1993	Oo Na, Sige Na	Bonggoy	
1993	Di Na Natuto	Ishmael	
1994	Lab Kita, Bilib Ka Ba?	Carlos & Billie	
1994	Mistah	Mario Cariño	
1994	Col. Billy Bibit, RAM	Gringo Honasan	
1995	P're Hanggang sa Huli	Brando Del Valle	
1996	Anak, Pagsubok Lamang ng Diyos	Rico	
1998	Tulak ng Bibig, Kabig ng Dibdib	Lando	
1999	'Di Pwedeng Hindi Puwede	Carding	
1999	Bilib Ako sa 'Yo	Gatdula	
2000	Tunay Na Tunay: Gets Mo? Gets Ko!	Nick Abeleda	
2000	Eto Na Naman Ako	Abet Dimaguiba	
2000	Kailangan Ko'y Ikaw	Guillermo "Gimo" Talumpati	
2001	Ooops, Teka Lang... Diskarte Ko 'To!	Dario Daliaga	
2001	Buhay Kamao	Pepe	
2001	Pagdating ng Panahon	Manuel	
2002	Hari ng Selda: Anak ni Baby Ama 2	Anghel	
2002	Videoke King	King	
2002	Jeannie, Bakit Ngayon Ka Lang	Badong Bulaong	
2003	You and Me Against the World	Paolo Guerrero	
2003	Alab ng Lahi	Gregorio Magtanggol	
2004	ASTIGmatism	Bien	
2004	Kulimlim	Jake	
2005	La Visa Loca	Jesus Huson	
2006	Till I Met You	Gabriel	
2007	Blackout	Gil Blanco	
2008	Brown Twelve	Leon	
2008	Triple Romance	Marco	
2008	Ikaw Pa Rin, Bongga Ka Boy!	Boy	
2009	Sundo	Romano	
2009	Paano Ginawa ang Isang Robin Padilla	Himself	
2011	Tum: My Pledge of Love	Ravan Raza	Also writer and director
2011	Wacha Wacha	Dominador "Dondi" Matias	
2013	10,000 Hours	Gabriel Molino Alcaraz	
2014	Sa Ngalan ng Ama, Ina at mga Anak	Ongkoy	
2014	Bonifacio: Ang Unang Pangulo	Andrés Bonifacio	
2017	Unexpectedly Yours	Cocoy	
2019	Bato (The General Ronald dela Rosa Story)	Ronald "Bato" dela Rosa	
2020	Hayop Ka!	Roger	
2022	Maid in Malacañang	Gen. Fabian Ver	
TBA	Bad Boy 3	Bumbo	Also producer and director
TBA	Untitled Brillante Mendoza film		

==== As director only ====
Year	Title	Notes
2020	Memoirs of a Teenage Rebel	

=== Television ===
Year	Title	Role
1999–2001	Pwedeng Pwede	Carding Caguiat
2003–2004	Basta't Kasama Kita	Alberto "Ambet" Katindig
2006	Kamao: Matira Matibay	Himself / Host
2006	Pilipinas Ngayon Na!	Himself / Host
2007	Asian Treasures	Elias Pinaglabanan / Susi
2008	Joaquin Bordado	Joaquin "Joaquin Bordado" Apacible
2009	Totoy Bato	Arturo "Totoy Bato" Magtanggol
2010	Wowowee	Himself / Special Guest Host
2010	Pilipinas Win Na Win	Himself / Host
2011	Guns and Roses	Abelardo "Abel" Marasigan
2011	Wiltime Bigtime	Guest
2011–2013	Toda Max	Bartolome "Tol" Batumbakal
2013	Kailangan Ko'y Ikaw	Police Insp. Gregorio "Bogs" Dagohoy
2014	Talentadong Pinoy 2014	Himself / Host
2014	The Ryzza Mae Show	Himself / Guest
2014	Tonight with Arnold Clavio	Himself / Guest
2015	2 1/2 Daddies	Apostol / Apol Pastoran
2016	Pilipinas Got Talent Season 5	Himself / Judge
2016	Game ng Bayan	Himself / Host
2018	Pilipinas Got Talent Season 6	Himself / Judge
2018	Sana Dalawa ang Puso	Leonardo "Leo" Tabayoyong
2020	Unlad: Kaagapay sa Hanapbuhay	Himself / Host
2020–2021	Kesayasaya	Carding Magtanggol
2026	Blood vs Duty	Ahmad Mustapha

=== Non-acting roles ===
==== Producer ====
Year	Title	Notes
2021	Victor 88	Web documentary series

==== Writer ====
Year	Title	Works	Credited as
1992	Bad Boy 2	Story and screenplay	Robinhood Padilla
1992	Miss Na Miss Kita (Utol Kong Hoodlum II)	Story and screenplay	Robinhood C. Padilla
1993	Makuha Ka sa Tingin (Kung Puwede lang)	Story and screenplay	Robinhood Cariño Padilla
2002	Hari ng Selda: Anak ni Baby Ama 2	Story and screenplay	Robinhood Cariño Padilla
2004	Sigaw	Story and screenplay	Robinhood C. Padilla

== Awards and nominations ==
Year	Award-giving body	Category	Work	Result
1991	FAMAS Award	Best Actor	Barumbado	Nominated
1992	Box Office Entertainment Awards	Box Office King	Maging Sino Ka Man	Won
1994	Box Office Entertainment Awards	Box Office King	'Di Na Natuto (Sorry Na, Puwede Ba?)	Won
2001	Box Office Entertainment Awards	Box Office King	Kailangan Ko'y Ikaw	Won
2001	Box Office Entertainment Awards	Box Office King	Tunay na Tunay: Gets Mo? Gets Ko!	Won
2006	FAMAS Award	Best Actor	La Visa Loca	Won
2006	Gawad Urian Award	Best Actor	La Visa Loca	Won
2006	Golden Screen Award	Best Actor	La Visa Loca	Won
2006	Star Award	Movie Actor of the Year	La Visa Loca	Nominated
2008	Golden Screen Award	Best Performance by an Actor in a Leading Role (Drama)	Blackout	Nominated
2009	Cinema One Originals Digital Film Festival	Cinema One Legend Award		Won
2012	PMPC Star Awards for Television	Best Comedy Actor	Toda Max	Won
2013	Metro Manila Film Festival	Best Actor	10,000 Hours	Won
2013	The EdukCircle Awards	Most Influential Celebrity Endorser of the Year		Won
2013	Golden Screen TV Awards	Outstanding Performance by an Actor in a Gag/Comedy Program	Toda Max	Nominated
2013	Metro Manila Film Festival	Movie Actor of the Year	10,000 Hours	Won
2014	Yahoo Celebrity Awards	Celebrity Family of the Year	Padilla Family	Won
2014	The EdukCircle Awards	Most Influential Celebrity Endorser of the Year		Won
2014	Star Award	Movie Actor of the Year	10,000 Hours	Nominated
2014	Metro Manila Film Festival	Best Actor	Bonifacio: Ang Unang Pangulo	Nominated
2014	FAMAS Award	Best Actor	10,000 Hours	Nominated
2015	Gawad Urian Award	Best Actor	Bonifacio: Ang Unang Pangulo	Nominated
2015	FAMAS Award	Best Actor	Bonifacio: Ang Unang Pangulo	Nominated
2015	Star Award	Movie Actor of the Year	Bonifacio: Ang Unang Pangulo	Nominated
2015	The EdukCircle Awards	Most Influential Celebrity Endorser of the Year		Won
2015	Star Award	Darling of the Press		Nominated
2016	FAMAS Award	Fernando Poe Jr. Memorial Award		Won
2018	Box Office Entertainment Awards	Best Actor	Unexpectedly Yours	Nominated
2018	Box Office Entertainment Awards	All-Time Favorite Actor	Unexpectedly Yours	Won
2022	Asia's Golden Icons Awards	Asia's Most Iconic Showbiz Personality of the Year		Won
