= Hari ng Selda: Anak ni Baby Ama 2 =

2002 action film by Deo Fajardo Jr.

Hari ni Selda: Anak ni Baby Ama 2
- Official movie poster
- Directed by: Deo Fajardo Jr.
- Written by: Robin Padilla; Deo Fajardo Jr.
- Produced by: Vincent Del Rosario III
- Starring: Robin Padilla
- Cinematography: Romulo Araojo
- Edited by: Danny Gloria
- Music by: Rey Valera
- Production company: Viva Films
- Distributed by: Viva Films
- Release date: March 30, 2002
- Running time: 120 minutes
- Country: Philippines
- Language: Filipino

Hari ng Selda: Anak ni Baby Ama 2 (lit. '"King of the cell block: Son of Baby Ama 2"') is a 2002 Philippine action film directed by Deo Fajardo Jr. and co-written by Robin Padilla, who reprises his role as the titular character. It is the sequel to the 1990 film Anak ni Baby Ama

The film is streaming online on YouTube.

== Synopsis ==
Set in the National Penitentiary, Anghel, a convicted criminal and respected by his inmates, is serving his sentence when he meets Angelica, a visiting college graduate who is intrigued and drawn to him. At first, Anghel is annoyed by her presence but eventually grows to be fond of her. Unexpectedly, the two fall in love, which alarms the people around them and tries to keep them apart.

== Cast ==
- Robin Padilla as Anghel
- Angelika Dela Cruz as Angelica
- Rommel Padilla as Erwin
- Raven Villanueva as Isabel
- Johnny Delgado as Supt. Mortel
- Berting Labra as Ka Turing
- Roldan Aquino as Director Reyes
- Flora Gasser as Yaya Belen
- Evangeline Pascual as Mrs. Santiago
- Jordan Castillo as Joey P.
- Dexter Doria as Ladyguard
- Leychard Sicangco as Ley G.
- Dick Israel as Billy Casiping
- Boy Roque as Musang
- June Hidalgo as Kojak
- July Hidalgo as Ugoy
- Daria Ramirez as Anghel's Mother
- Kathy Mori as Lyn
- Ferico Dizon as Jerry
- Jeffrey Tam as Jeff
- Cris Soarez as Marty

== Production ==
Most of the scenes of the film were shot inside the New Bilibid Prison. Robin Padilla, who co-wrote the story, stated that 80% of the film happened in real life and was based on the experience when he served jail time for illegal possession of firearms.
