= The Good Daughter =

2012 Philippine television drama series

- Title card
- Genre: Drama
- Created by: Des Garbes-Severino
- Written by: Aloy Adlawan; Anna Aleta Nadela; Glaiza Ramirez; Gilbeys Sardea
- Directed by: Mike Tuviera
- Creative director: Jun Lana
- Starring: Kylie Padilla
- Theme music composer: Sherwin Castillo; Mike Tan
- Opening theme: "Ba't 'Di Ko Ba Nasabi?" by Krizza Neri
- Country of origin: Philippines
- Original language: Tagalog
- No. of episodes: 78

Production
- Executive producer: Carol B. Galve
- Producer: Wilma Galvante
- Production locations: Manila, Philippines; Batangas, Philippines
- Cinematography: Nonong Legaspi
- Camera setup: Multiple-camera setup
- Running time: 20–25 minutes
- Production company: GMA Entertainment TV

Original release
- Network: GMA Network
- Release: February 13 – June 1, 2012

The Good Daughter is a 2012 Philippine television drama series broadcast by GMA Network. Directed by Mike Tuviera, it stars Kylie Padilla in the title role. It premiered on February 13, 2012 on the network's Afternoon Prime line up. The series concluded on June 1, 2012, with a total of 78 episodes.

The series is streaming online on YouTube.

== Cast and characters ==
Cast

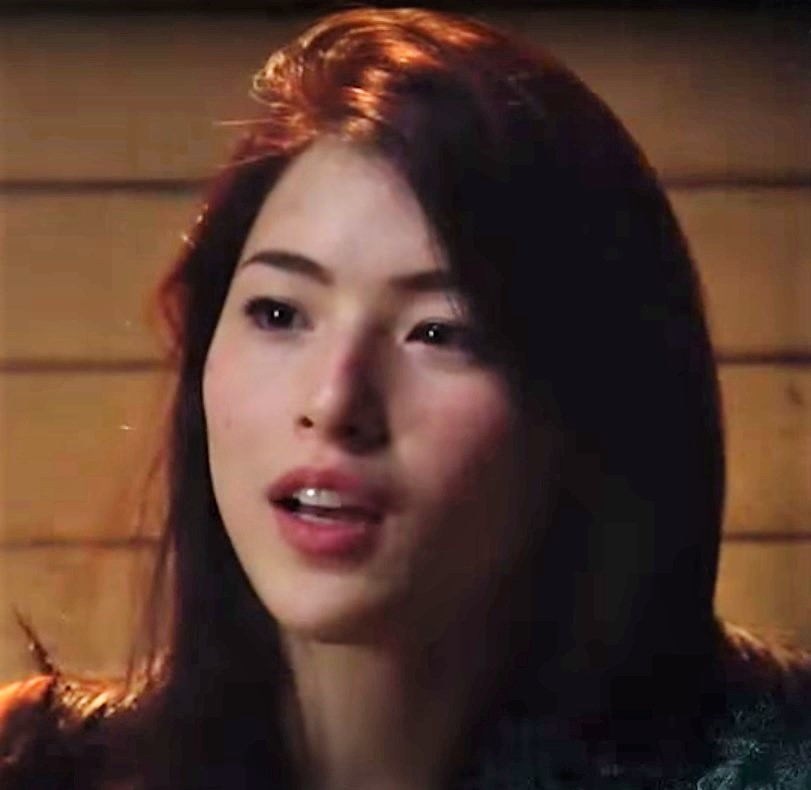
Kylie Padilla

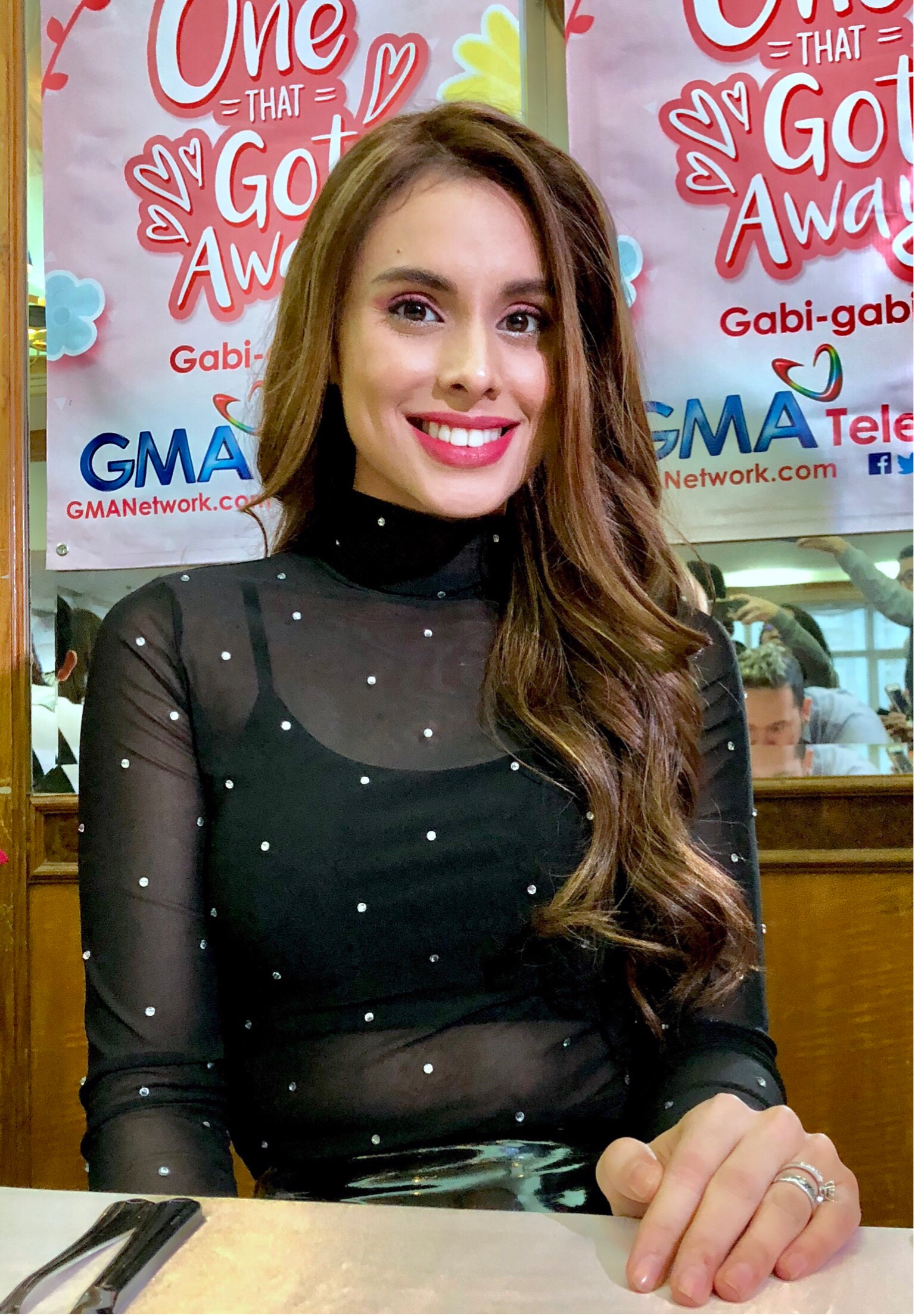
Max Collins

Lead cast

- Kylie Padilla as Bea Emmanuel Atilano Guevarra

Supporting cast

- Rocco Nacino as Darwin Alejandro Reyes
- Alicia Mayer as Sharon Alejandro-Reyes / Josephine
- Raymond Bagatsing as Rico Guevarra
- LJ Reyes as Francesca "Frances" Alejandro Reyes
- Max Collins as Ziri Claustro
- Luz Valdez as Lourdes Atilano
- Ervic Vijandre as Mario Escobar
- Dion Ignacio as Paul Noche
- Angeli Nicole Sanoy as Julia Alejandro Guevarra

Guest cast

- Glydel Mercado as Tina Atilano-Guevarra
- Lito Legaspi as Miguel Guevarra
- Chinggoy Alonzo as Manuel
- Daniella Amable as young Bea
- Jerould Aceron as young Darwin
- Joni Macnab as young Frances
- Maricel Morales as Chesca
- Kevin Santos as Arnold
- Froilan Sales as Alex
- Dionne de Guzman as Nania
- Charito Alvear as Fe
- Alvin Aragon as Mervin
- Benedict Campos as Hans

== Ratings ==
According to AGB Nielsen Philippines' Mega Manila household television ratings, the pilot episode of The Good Daughter earned an 18.3% rating. The final episode scored a 28.2% rating.
