= Wheel of Fortune (Philippine game show) =

- Genre: Game show
- Based on: Wheel of Fortune by Merv Griffin
- Directed by: Al Quinn (ABC); Bobet Vidanes (ABS-CBN)
- Presented by: ABC; Rustom Padilla (host); Victoria London (puzzle assistant); ABS-CBN; Kris Aquino (host); Zara Aldana and Jasmine Fitzgerald (puzzle assistants)
- Country of origin: Philippines
- Original language: Tagalog
- No. of episodes: 278

Production
- Executive producers: Mitch del Rosario Quijano (ABC); Rancy Amor Recato (ABS-CBN)
- Camera setup: Multi-camera
- Running time: 30 minutes
- Production companies: Califon Productions; ABS-CBN Studios; ABC Entertainment Department; Sony Pictures Television

Original release
- Network: ABC
- Release: November 19, 2001 – May 31, 2002
- Network: ABS-CBN
- Release: January 14 – July 25, 2008

Wheel of Fortune is a Philippine television game show broadcast by ABC and ABS-CBN. The show is based on the American original of the same name. Originally hosted by Rustom Padilla, it aired on ABC from November 19, 2001, to May 31, 2002. The show moved to ABS-CBN's Primetime Bida line up from January 14 to July 25, 2008, replacing the second season of Kapamilya, Deal or No Deal and was replaced by the third season of Kapamilya, Deal or No Deal. Kris Aquino served as the final host.

Advertisements for the ABS-CBN version started during that station's coverage of the Mayweather-Hatton fight on December 9, 2007. It involved a puzzle that would reveal the title of the show. Then advertisements urged viewers to join via text messaging.

Despite Wheel of Fortune having two Philippine versions, the ABS-CBN version, as well as several of its advertisements and press releases, do not seem to recognize Rustom Padilla's version (known from this point as "the ABC version").

== Common rules ==
The format was generally the same as the American version. They follow the rules implemented at the time of showing: the ABC version following rules of the game as of 2001 while the ABS-CBN version looks at those implemented in 2006. Listed below are rules common to the two versions as well as their differences:

- In the ABC version, Red Player would start Round 1, Yellow Player would begin Round 2, Blue Player would commence Round 3, and so on. In the ABS-CBN version, Toss-Up Rounds, valued at ₱5,000 and ₱10,000 are played. The winner of each toss-up gets to begin the next round (the person starting Round 2 is the winner of Round 1). The ₱10,000 Toss-Up puzzle was played before the third round. In both versions, play passes from Red, to Yellow, to Blue, and back to Red.
- In the ABC version, the 24-wedged wheel originally had mostly three-digit amounts starting at ₱500, but they were later replaced with four-digit ones ranging from ₱1,000 to ₱4,000. In the ABS-CBN version, the basic amounts range from ₱3,000 to ₱15,000. There are also Bankrupt and Lose A Turn spaces in the Wheel in both versions.
  - Unique to the ABC version was a "Surprise" Wedge. It was a detachable wedge to be won by the player who landed on it and guessed a correct letter. Unlike the Surprise wedge used on the American version, the Surprise was revealed if the player landed on it and called a correct letter. The player still had to solve the puzzle to keep the prize.
  - Unique to the ABS-CBN version are two unusual wedges.
    - The "second" Bankrupt wedge is a one-thirds size ₱100,000 wedge, with two one-thirds size Bankrupt wedges between the special value. This space is not a detachable wedge, unlike the special value one-thirds space wedge ($10,000 won in a round if won until 2008, Million Dollar Wedge since 2008) in the US version. Whoever lands on the ₱100,000 space and correctly guesses a letter wins that value as spendable cash instead of a cash prize (pre-2008) or a chance to win a cash prize in the bonus round (2008-). In succeeding rounds, the one-thirds size ₱100,000 space is occupied by a Jackpot wedge in Round 2, and the Power Wedge in Round 3 and beyond (see below). A similar ₱200,000 one-thirds size wedge (again surrounded by Bankrupts) also appears in Rounds 4 and beyond. The ₱4,000 space acted much the same way in the ABC version, as it was placed between a Lose a Turn and one Bankrupt space, both regular-sized, to add excitement.
    - Another wedge exclusive to the ABS-CBN version is a "Power" wedge. Anyone who lands on it and correctly guesses a letter can steal the earnings of the leading opponent in that round. The French version later followed suit with a wedge called Hold-Up, and the 2009 revival in the Netherlands used a similar wedge known as Overhaul.
- Both versions use a four-row 52-space puzzle board, with 12 spaces each on the upper and lower rows and 14 on each of the two middle rows. They both resemble the one the US version currently uses since 1997.
  - The ABC version's puzzle board was made up of translucent panes of glass. Panes that were part of a puzzle were illuminated blue on the sides. Such panes were then lighted green when they contained a correctly guessed letter. The pane revealed the letter as if it was a shadow of a cutout one illuminated from behind. Arguably, setting up puzzles in such a board was like the procedure used in the US version prior to 1997 when it used trilons in its puzzle board.
  - The ABS-CBN version's puzzle board closely resembles the one in the US version, using 52 monitors that reveal the spaces of a puzzle easily and quickly. While the two puzzle assistants do the same thing Vanna White does in baring the letters (seemingly touching the right side of the monitor), it is revealed that each monitor has a small button on its right side, seen while a puzzle assistant is being introduced close-up.
- Players have the option to buy vowels. In the ABC version, vowels cost ₱400; in the ABS-CBN version, they cost ₱2,500. As is the standard rule globally, the price is flat rate so the cost of the vowel is subtracted from the player's round total no matter how many of that vowel appears in the puzzle or if that vowel is in the puzzle at all.
- The "Free Spin" could also be found in both versions. In the ABC version, it was an entire regular-sized orange detachable wedge. In the ABS-CBN version, it was a green oval token, similar to the one used in the US version until late 2000s rule changes eliminated the option.
  - Obtaining a Free Spin in the ABS-CBN version will also reward the contestant the value on which it is placed (in this case, ₱6,000) multiplied by the number of times the correctly guessed consonant appears in the puzzle.
- In 2002, the second round featured a Goodie wedge on the wheel.
- There was a Jackpot Round in Round 2 in both versions. Like the American counterpart, the Jackpot started at ₱5,000 and increased with each spin with the amount last landed on to be added. To win it, the player must land on it, correctly guess a letter, and immediately solve the puzzle. However, on the ABS-CBN version, only by choosing a correct letter would the amount landed on be added to the jackpot, which now started at ₱100,000.
  - A slight difference in the ABS-CBN version was that a player was not given a choice of whether or not to solve (they must solve within five seconds), and should one be unable to, ₱3,000 per consonant will be added to the Jackpot and to the player's winnings for that round. Of course, the ABC version never implemented this rule.
- There are also Speed-Up Rounds in both versions. In the ABC version, each consonant revealed would earn a player a thousand pesos plus the amount landed on the final spin. Vowels were worth nothing. In the ABS-CBN version, the last spun amount becomes the worth of each consonant revealed. If the Wheel stops at the Power Wedge, the highest score earned by a contestant during that round would be the basis. Vowels would initially cost the contestant a flat rate of ₱2,500 (unless the contestant does not receive any money), but this rule was later scrapped. Sometimes in both versions, Speed-Up rounds are not played due to time constraints.
- Bonus Rounds are seen in both versions, wherein a player could win money or a car. In the ABC version, the 1989-2001 five-envelope format was used. In the ABS-CBN version, the format seen on the U. S. version since 2001 was used with cars and cash amounts from ₱50,000 to ₱2,000,000. After the Bonus puzzle is revealed, six predetermined letters are inserted, followed by three consonants and a vowel of the player's choice, and a ten-second time limit. The ABC version used the American-standard predetermined letters R, S, T, L, N, and E. The ABS-CBN version replaces R with K, since the latter occurs more in many Philippine languages than the former and the host's name starts with this letter.
- The three top winners from Monday through Friday competed on Saturday for a berth in the monthly finals, the winner of which would also win a brand new car. In the second round, the Jackpot started at ₱10,000.

== Changes and additions ==
The ABS-CBN version also introduced additions to the format of the show that did not exist in the ABC version. Already mentioned under "Common rules" section above are the Power wedge and the Toss-Up Rounds. Below are other additions.

- Originally the Toss Ups were inconsistent. However, after several episodes, they have been placed like so:
  - First Toss-up determines the first player in Round 1.
  - The winner of Round 1 plays first in Round 2.
  - Second Toss-up determines the first player in Round 3. But if Rounds 1 and 2 are finished earlier than usual, the winner of Round 2 starts Round 3 and the second Toss-up occurs before Round 4.
- In Round 3, one Mystery wedge is added, with the value of the non-Bankrupt wedge being P200,000. Contestants who reach the wedge have the choice of taking the multiple of cash written, which is P5,000, or looking what is behind the wedge. Also, the color of the Mystery wedge varies in each episode, as opposed to just one color or gradient in the American version.
- There is so far three uniquely Filipino categories. One is called "Around the 'Bahay'" (a play of the "Around the House" category); Bahay (literally house) refers to the Pinoy Big Brother House, known among Filipino viewers as Bahay ni Kuya. The second is "Tatak Pinoy" (Marked Filipino), referring to objects, traditions or persons uniquely Filipino. The third is "School Life" (Also known as "College Life" in the US), referring to the things and doings related to School.
- There have also been Prize Puzzles, regularly appearing in Round 2, but they are defined differently that those in the US version. After a puzzle has been solved, the prize is introduced. A question related to the puzzle is asked, in which if answered correctly could give the contestant the said prize. Normally, this special prize is not cash.
- House minimums are not given, but it is implied that contestants are given parting gifts for their time on the show.
- When celebrities play, it is not mentioned whether or not the winnings go to charity, but it seems implied. However, since they can also play for a car, it is not known where the vehicle will go to.

== Wheel components ==
The gallery below shows a comparison between the Wheels used in the ABC version and the one seen in the ABS-CBN version, as well as the special wedges laid on each Wheel.

The ABC version's 2001 Wheel is shown below and styled like the one used on the Philippine show. The 2002 version shown, however, is just a simulation using the style of the American Wheel and does not actually picture the actual design of the Wheel. The same can be said with its special wedges. Each special wedge had its name printed twice, one vertically along the wedge's length and the other horizontally along the width. They were designed as such because such a wedge if won was placed in a holder beside the contestant, instead of in front like the American version does. Also of note: both the actual P4,000 space and the actual Jackpot wedge were decorated with gold sequins.

On the other hand, the ABS-CBN Wheel and its special wedges are also simulations, but they are faithful to the actual ones seen in the show. However, the actual P100,000 space and the actual Power and Jackpot wedges all have holographic backgrounds, which is difficult to be replicated in simulated conditions.

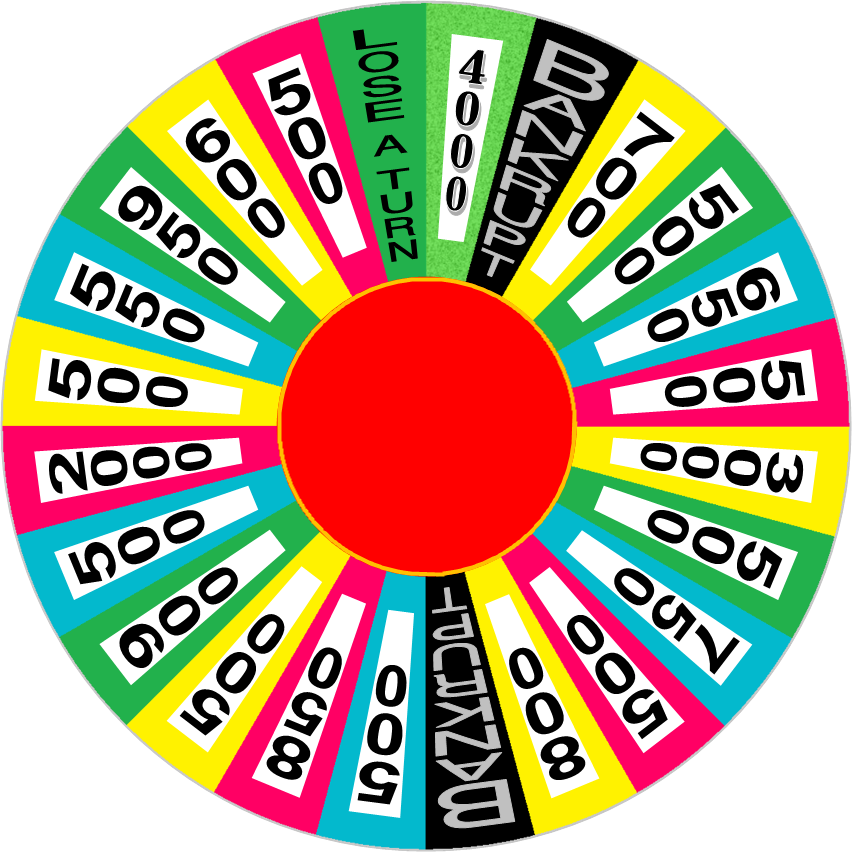
A recreation of the Wheel used in the ABC version in November 2001.

A simulation of the Wheel used in the ABC version in 2002. Shown here is the basic configuration as used for most of the show's run.

A recreation the basic configuration of the Wheel used in the ABS-CBN version.

The special wedges used in the ABC version. From left to right, the Free Spin wedge, the Surprise wedge, and the Jackpot wedge.

The special wedges used in the ABS-CBN version. From left to right, the Power wedge, the Jackpot wedge, and the Mystery wedge.

== See also ==
- Wheel of Fortune (American game show)
- Wheel of Fortune (game show) in different countries
