= Kylie Padilla =

Filipino actress, singer and model (born 1993)

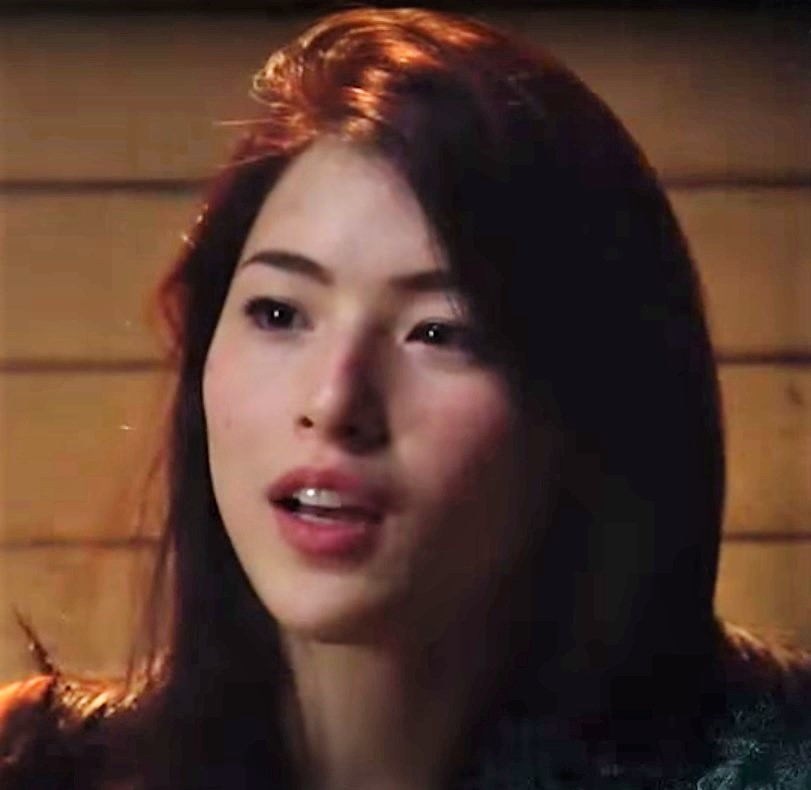
- Padilla in a 2014 short about the making of Dilim
- Born: Kylie Nicole Sicangco Padilla; January 25, 1993 (age 33); Angeles City, Philippines
- Occupations: Actress; singer; model
- Years active: 2006–present
- Known for: Erenea in Joaquin Bordado; Heidi in Tween Hearts; Bea in The Good Daughter; Ada in Adarna; Leonor Rivera in Ilustrado; Celine in Buena Familia; Amihan in Encantadia (2016)
- Spouse: Aljur Abrenica (m. 2018; sep. 2021)
- Children: 2
- Parents: Robin Padilla (father); Liezl Sicangco (mother)
- Relatives: Padilla family
- Musical career
- Genres: Pop; OPM
- Instrument: Vocals
- Years active: 2014–present
- Label: GMA Music (2014–present)

Kylie Nicole Sicangco Padilla (Tagalog pronunciation: [paˈdilja]; born January 25, 1993) is a Filipino actress, singer and model. She is the daughter of actor Robin Padilla and Liezl Sicangco. She is currently an exclusive artist of GMA Network.

== Early life ==
Kylie Nicole Sicangco Padilla was born in Angeles, Pampanga, to Filipino actors Robin Padilla and Liezl Sicangco. From the age of seven, she studied in Queensland, Australia during her elementary years. She became a Muay Thai practitioner in 2008 after her family returned to the country. Although raised in the Jehovah's Witnesses faith, she had been practising Islam since April 1998, almost a decade before joining showbiz, despite not being a devout Muslim. According to Kylie Padilla during a TikTok Live, she now identifies as a Buddhist. She also shared that she used to practice Islam when she was younger.

== Career ==
Padilla is a GMA Network contract star. Her TV series include Joaquin Bordado, Blusang Itim, The Good Daughter and Adarna. She was awarded as the Best New Female Personality (tied with Patricia Gayod) in the 22nd PMPC Star Awards for Television last 2008 for her acting performance in Joaquin Bordado. In 2015, Padilla made guest appearances as a temporary host on the Philippine noontime variety show Eat Bulaga!. During her appearances, she participated in several segments of the program. In August 2015, she competed in the Cheerdance Pa More! edition of Bulaga Pa More!, performing a cheerleading routine with the Arellano Chiefsquad. She won both the weekly competition and the grand finals of the Cheerdance edition, which qualified her for the Bulaga Pa More’s Battle of the Champions. She later advanced to the competition's grand finals, where she finished as one of the finalists.

Padilla became a household name due to her role in fantasy-drama reboot of Encantadia where she portrayed Sang'gre Amihan, the series' lead monarch character.

== Personal life ==
Padilla got engaged to actor Aljur Abrenica by late January 2017, with whom she has a son born on August 4, 2017. The two had started dating in 2011 until they broke up in 2014. They dated again in September 2016. They got married on December 11, 2018.

In December 2019, Padilla gave birth to her second child However, the couple separated in April 2021. Padilla was later linked to JM de Guzman, although she denied the romance allegations between them. She also denied de Guzman's involvement in her and Abrenica's breakup. As of 2026, the annulment of Padilla's marriage to Abrenica is still being processed.

She discussed her struggles and hardship of working as a single mother.

== Filmography ==
=== Film ===
Year	Title	Role
2014	Sa Ngalan ng Ama, Ina at mga Anak	Anna
2014	Dilim	Maritess
2017	Triptiko	Ann
2023	Unravel: A Swiss Side Love Story	Lucy
2024	Green Bones	Lisa
2026	The Lotto Winner	Aia

=== Television series ===
Year	Title	Role
2008	Carlo J. Caparas' Joaquin Bordado	Erenea
2011	Dwarfina	Chloe Agustin
2011	Elena M. Patron's Blusang Itim	Jessa Escote-Santiago / Jessica Lopez-Santiago / Jessica Madrid
2011–2012	Reel Love Presents Tween Hearts	Heidilyn "Heidi" Rivera
2012	Broken Vow	Jenna Rastro-Santiago
2012	The Good Daughter	Bea Emmanuel Guevarra-Reyes
2013	Unforgettable	Rosanna "Anna" Caruhatan
2013–2014	Adarna	Ada / Angel
2014	Innamorata	Hope
2014	Ilustrado	Leonor Rivera
2015	More Than Words	Roxanne / Katie
2015–2016	Buena Familia	Rochel Carter- Buena / Celine Agravante- Buena / CJ Agravante / Celine Carter- Buena
2016–2017	Encantadia	Sang'gre / Hara Durie Amihan II
2018	The Cure	Adira Aguilar
2018	Victor Magtanggol	Ami / Amy
2019	TODA One I Love	Mayora Angela "Gelay" Dimagiba-Magsino
2021	BetCin	Bet
2022	Bolera	Jose Maria "Joni / Bolera" C. Fajardo Jr.
2023	Mga Lihim ni Urduja	Police Lt. Gemma Lynne "Gemma / Gem" Davino / Rose Dayanghirang- Posadas
2023	Voltes V: Legacy	Arisa
2023	Black Rider	Bernice Guerrero
2024–2025	Asawa ng Asawa Ko	Hannah "Tigre" Rodriguez- Lozano
2025	Lilet Matias: Attorney-at-Law	Atty. Marilou Sabanal
2025; 2026	Encantadia Chronicles: Sang'gre	Sanggre / Hara Durie Amihan II
2025	My Father's Wife	Gina Marie Rodriguez- Medina
2026–present	Taskforce Firewall	Isabelle "Isa" Cervantes

==== Variety shows and anthology series ====
Year	Title	Role
2009–2010	SOP Fully Charged	Herself (performer)
2010–2013	Party Pilipinas	Herself (performer)
2011	Spooky Nights Presents: Sumpa	Tina
2013	Sunday All Stars	Herself (performer)
2013	Startalk	Herself (guest)
2013	One Day, Isang Araw	Maya / Diwata
2013	Magpakailanman: Ang Prinsesa ng Mga Pipi	Princess Pura
2013	Wagas: Ang Siga at ang Probinsyana	Maura
2015	Wagas: Pag-ibig na dumaan sa pinakamahirap	Emily
2015	Imbestigador	Anria Galang Espiritu
2015	Alamat: Mariang Sinukuan	Mariang Sinukuan
2015	Maynila: Sikretong Malupit	Katrina
2015	Maynila: Magpakatotoo Ka, 'Teh!	Jenna
2016	Eat Bulaga Lenten Special: Walang Kapalit	Rowena
2022	All-Out Sundays	Herself (guest host and performer)

=== Commercials ===
Year	Brand Name	Role	Notes
2012	Talk 'N Text	Herself	with Robin Padilla
2015	Myra	Herself	
2016	Surf	Amihan	Together with Gabbi Garcia as Alena
2017	Surf	Amihan	Together with Mikee Quintos as Lira
2017	Watsons PH	Herself	Together with Lorna Tolentino, Edu Manzano, Iya Villania and Christian Bautista

=== Endorsements ===
- Marikina Shoe Exchange (MSE)
- Watsons Philippines

== Discography ==
- Seasons (2014)

== Awards and nominations ==
Year	Award	Category	Nominated work	Result	Note
2008	22nd PMPC Star Awards for TV	Best New Female TV Personality	Joaquin Bordado	Won	
2012	FHM Philippines	100 Sexiest Woman	Girls of FHM	Rank # 83	Second Filipina Muslim to include in the Sexiest Woman List
2012	Party Pilipinas Most-Liked Awards	Party Pilipinas Most-Liked Drama Actress	The Good Daughter	Nominated	
2013	1st Sunday All Stars Awards	Stand Out Scene Stealer	None	Won	Tie with Ruru Madrid
2013	1st Sunday All Stars Awards	Stand Out Season Performer	None	Nominated	
2015	MYX Music Awards 2015	Favorite MYX Celebrity VJ	None	Nominated	She was the MYX Celebrity VJ for the month of September 2014
2015	31st PMPC Star Awards for Movies	Face of the Night	None	Won	Together with Iñigo Pascual
2015	FHM Philippines	100 Sexiest Woman	Girls of FHM	Rank # 87	Second Filipina Muslim to include in the Sexiest Woman List along with Filipina-Malaysian model Nicole Alexandria
2015	7th PMPC Star Awards for Music	New Female Recording Artist of the Year	Seasons	Nominated	She sings her song, "Awake" before awarding the winner of the category New Female Recording Artist of the Year
2023	2023 Summer Metro Manila Film Festival	Best Actress	Unravel: A Swiss Side Love Story	Nominated	
