= BB Gandanghari =

Filipina actress and model (born 1967)

- Born: Rustom Cariño Padilla; September 4, 1967 (age 59)
- Citizenship: Philippines; United States
- Education: Saint Louis University, Baguio; University of California, Los Angeles
- Occupations: Actress; model; entertainer; comedian; director
- Years active: 1990–present
- Spouse: Carmina Villarroel (m. 1994; ann. 2002)
- Parents: Roy Padilla Sr. (father); Eva Cariño (mother)
- Family: Padilla

Binibini "BB" Gandanghari (born Rustom Cariño Padilla; Tagalog pronunciation: [paˈdɪl.ja]; born September 4, 1967) is a Filipino-American actress, model, entertainer, comedian, and director.

She is the elder sibling of Robin Padilla and the younger sibling of Royette and Rommel Padilla, all of whom are actors. Gandanghari enjoyed success in Philippine films in the early 1990s (as "Rustom Padilla"), before taking a hiatus in 2001.

She returned to prominence in 2006 when she joined Pinoy Big Brother Celebrity Edition where she came out as a gay male after 44 days. She would later come out as a transgender woman in 2009 when she adopted her current name and became an American citizen in 2022.

== Early life and education ==
Binibini Gandanghari was born on September 4, 1967 to Casimiro Bustamante Padilla, a film director and Lolita Eva (née Cariño) who was also an actress. She has 4 siblings: three brothers and four sisters. Gandanghari is assigned male at birth and went by the given name, Rustom, prior to transitioning in 2009.

Gandanghari belongs to the Padilla family of actors and politicians. Her brothers Robin Padilla and Rommel Padilla have both been involved in politics in Nueva Ecija; Robin ran for vice governor of the province in 1995, while Rommel later served as a member of the Nueva Ecija Provincial Board.

Gandanghari holds a Bachelor of Arts degree in economics from Saint Louis University in Baguio, Philippines and studied filmmaking at University of California Los Angeles in 2010. She finished Bachelor of Science in Entertainment Business in 2025.

== Career ==
Gandanghari entered show business as a matinee idol and later as an action star. She was also the presenter of Philippine franchise for Wheel of Fortune on ABC. After her hosting stint, Gandanghari left the Philippines and studied film making in the United States. Gandanghari appeared in the film adaptation of the comic book Zsazsa Zaturnnah (her first film role as a gay man) as the gay salon owner Ada (Adrian), the alter ego of Zsazsa Zaturnnah. She appeared in the television series La Vendetta on GMA and the Happy Hearts, later appearing on the ABS-CBN teleserye, Eva Fonda.

In 2006, Gandanghari became one of the 14 housemates in Pinoy Big Brother: Celebrity Edition. On March 2, 2006, she came out as gay on the show. On day 45 of the competition, Gandanghari opted to voluntarily leave the house.

In 2009, Gandanghari hosted the National Kidlat Awards on the resort island of Boracay in Malay, Aklan. She appeared again in SRO Cinema Serye: Rowena Joy. In September 2017, Gandanghari signed with the Brogan Agency in Venice, California.

On 9 August 2019, she made her American television debut in the Netflix series GLOW, where she played a clairvoyant named Patricia in the eighth episode of the series' third season.

== Personal life ==
She, her mother, Robin, and three siblings were raised as Roman Catholics and later converted to the Jehovah Witness religion in 1985.

=== Former marriage ===
Padilla and actress Carmina Villarroel started relationship on June 24, 1992. They married on June 4, 1994, in a civil ceremony in Caloocan. They separated in September 1997 and Villarroel filed for annulment within the same year, which was formally granted by the Court of Pasig in June 2002.

=== Gender identity ===
In January 2009, Gandanghari came out as a transgender woman and chose to undergo gender confirmation surgery. Her brother Robin Padilla at first fully accepted the decision, but later recanted his earlier statements and admitted that he was still shocked and not on good terms with her. Their mother, and all of Gandanghari's other siblings continue to address her by her former male deadname, Rustom.

Gandanghari originally used the name Patricia Padilla but later sourced her newfound name from an art student in University of Santo Tomas whose actual name was Ganda—Hari. She later altered this name which is derived from the Filipino words:

- Bb. — (abbreviation of Binibini, an honorific equivalent to "Maiden")
- Gandanghari — a portmanteau combination of the words ganda (beauty) and hari (royalty, kingship)

She also uses the word "Bb." refers to the saying "'Be' all that you can 'be'".

The Superior Court of California in Orange County approved both her legal name and gender in 2016. She previously worked as a bookkeeper for a debt collection agency. In 2017, Gandanghari reportedly obtained employment as a driver for Uber and later as a caregiver for elderly in the United States.

In 2022, she became a citizen of the United States while her current name is also recognized on her U.S. passport.

== Filmography ==
=== Television ===
Year	Title	Role	Notes
1986–1993	Lunch Date	Herself/host	As Rustom Padilla
1992–1997	Valiente	Doctor Albert Rosales	As Rustom Padilla
1992–1994	17 Bernard Club	Herself	As Rustom Padilla
1993	GMA Telesine Specials		As Rustom Padilla
1994	Spotlight Drama Special		As Rustom Padilla
1994	Star Drama Theater Presents: Carmina	Guest Episode title: Magkasuyo	As Rustom Padilla
1997	Star Drama Theater Presents: Camille	Guest Episode title: Ang Daya Mo	As Rustom Padilla
1997–1999	Wansapanataym	Various roles	As Rustom Padilla
1999–2000	Pintados	Doctor Virus	As Rustom Padilla
1999–2001	Saan Ka Man Naroroon	Alex	As Rustom Padilla
2001	Wheel of Fortune	Herself	As Rustom Padilla
2007–2008	La Vendetta	Alfie Camba	As Rustom Padilla
2008–2009	Eva Fonda	Patricia "Patty" Rosal	As BB Gandanghari
2009	SRO Cinemaserye: Rowena Joy	Frannie	As BB Gandanghari
2009–2010	Cool Center	Herself	As BB Gandanghari
2012–2013	Enchanted Garden	Queen Michiko / Helfora	As BB Gandanghari
2015	2½ Daddies	Evangelio "Eva" Pastoran / Gelo Pastoran	As BB Gandanghari
2019	GLOW	Patricia	As BB Gandanghari
2022	Metro Manila Film Festival Gabi ng Parangal	Herself/host	As BB Gandanghari

=== Film ===
- Onyong Majikero (1991)
- Magnong Rehas (1992)
- Narito ang Puso Ko (1992)
- Ngayon at Kailanman (1992)
- Hanggang Saan Hanggang Kailan (1993)
- Kapag Iginuhit ang Hatol ng Puso (1993)
- Gagay: Prinsesa ng Brownout (1993)
- Ikaw (1993)
- Kadenang Bulaklak (1994)
- Brat Pack (1994)
- Hindi Magbabago (1994)
- Mistah (1994)
- Mars Ravelo's Darna! Ang Pagbabalik (1994)
- Marami Ka Pang Kakaining Bigas (1994)
- Sana Dalawa ang Puso Ko (1995)
- The Jessica Alfaro Story (1995)
- Maruja (1996)
- Bilang Na ang Araw Mo (1996)
- Paano Kung Wala Ka Na (1997)
- Abuso: Case #6433 (1997)
- Walang Katapusang Init (1998)
- Ganito Na Akong Magmahal (1998)
- May Isang Pamilya (1999)
- Ako'y Ibigin Mo ... Lalaking Matapang (1999)
- Bilib Ako Sa'yo (1999)
- Ganito Ako Magmahal (1999)
- Yamashita: The Tiger's Treasure (2001)
- Zsa Zsa Zaturnnah, ze Moveeh (2006)
- Happy Hearts (2007)
