= Mistah (film) =

- Theatrical release poster
- Directed by: Ricardo "Bebong" Osorio
- Screenplay by: Humilde "Meek" Roxas
- Story by: Mario Cariño
- Produced by: William Leary
- Starring: Robin Padilla; Rustom Padilla (Note: Credited as Rustom Padilla; Mistah was released before Gandanghari came out as transgender.)
- Cinematography: Joe Batac; Ricardo Herrera
- Edited by: Rene Tala
- Music by: Mandy Ferrer; Robinhood C. Padilla
- Production company: Viva Films
- Distributed by: Viva Films
- Release date: January 2, 1994
- Running time: 119 minutes
- Country: Philippines
- Language: Filipino

Mistah is a 1994 Philippine action war film directed by Ricardo "Bebong" Osorio. The film stars Robin Padilla, Roi Vinzon, BB Gandanghari, Rommel Padilla and Ana Roces. Mistah is a military slang meaning classmate or batchmate within the Philippine Military Academy.

The film is streaming online on YouTube.

== Cast ==
- Robin Padilla as Sgt. Mario C. Cariño PC
- Rustom Padilla as 2nd Lt. Flavier PC
- Roi Vinzon as 1st Lt. Duterte PC
- Daniel Fernando as Cpl. Daniel Aquino PC
- Joko Diaz as Private/New Recruit PC
- Ana Roces as Linda
- Rommel Padilla as Cpl. Remy De Jesus PC
- Bomber Moran as Alih
- Dindo Arroyo as Kumander Ratari
- Jun Hidalgo as Kumander Malik
- Royette Padilla as 2nd Lt. Dela Cruz PC
- Lilet Goldberg as Brenda
- Bebong Osorio as Lt. Col. Onofre Q. Salgado PC
- Liezl Sicangco-Padilla as Brenda
- Eddie Infante as Old Man/Imam
- Maritess Samson as Daniel's Wife
- Marissa de Guzman as Willy's Wife
- Jun Aristorenas as Cpl. Willy Santos PC
- Boy Roque as Cpl. Roque PC
- July Hidalgo as Cpl. Hidalgo PC
- Val Iglesia as Drunk Man in the restaurant
- Rando Almanzor as Drunk Man in the restaurant

== Production ==
Mistah was announced by BB Gandanghari at a press conference in December 1993. Scenes from the film were shot in Pagsanjan, Laguna.

== Trivia ==
Roi Vinzon was Character Lt. Duterte, Then The Duterte Family Was Allied by Senator Robin Padilla Part of Former President Rodrigo Duterte Was Arrested by International Criminal Court Vice President Sara Duterte as One of allied of Senator Imee Marcos Cayetano Siblings and Jinggoy Estrada.
