= Adarna (TV series) =

Philippine television drama series

- Title card
- Genre: Fantasy drama
- Created by: Kit Villanueva-Langit
- Written by: Kit Villanueva-Langit; Geng Delgado; Luningning Ribay; Jules Dan Katanyag
- Directed by: Ricky Davao
- Creative director: Jun Lana
- Starring: Kylie Padilla
- Theme music composer: Simon Tan; Joseph B. Olfindo
- Opening theme: "Paliparin ang Pangarap" by Aicelle Santos and Maricris Garcia
- Country of origin: Philippines
- Original language: Tagalog
- No. of episodes: 80

Production
- Executive producer: Winnie Hollis–Reyes
- Production locations: Manila, Philippines; Basco, Batanes, Philippines
- Editors: Benedict Lavastida; Robert Ryan Reyes
- Camera setup: Multiple-camera setup
- Running time: 18–36 minutes
- Production company: GMA Entertainment TV

Original release
- Network: GMA Network
- Release: November 18, 2013 – March 7, 2014

Adarna is a Philippine television drama fantasy series broadcast by GMA Network. The series is inspired by the Philippine epic Ibong Adarna. Directed by Ricky Davao, it stars Kylie Padilla in the title role. It premiered on November 18, 2013 on the network's Telebabad line up. The series concluded on March 7, 2014, with a total of 80 episodes.

The series is streaming online on YouTube.

== Premise ==
Ada is prophesied to be the most powerful healer in Pugad Sanghaya. As she discovers the path towards fulfilling her fate, she meets three men - Migo, Bok and Falco.

== Cast and characters ==
Cast

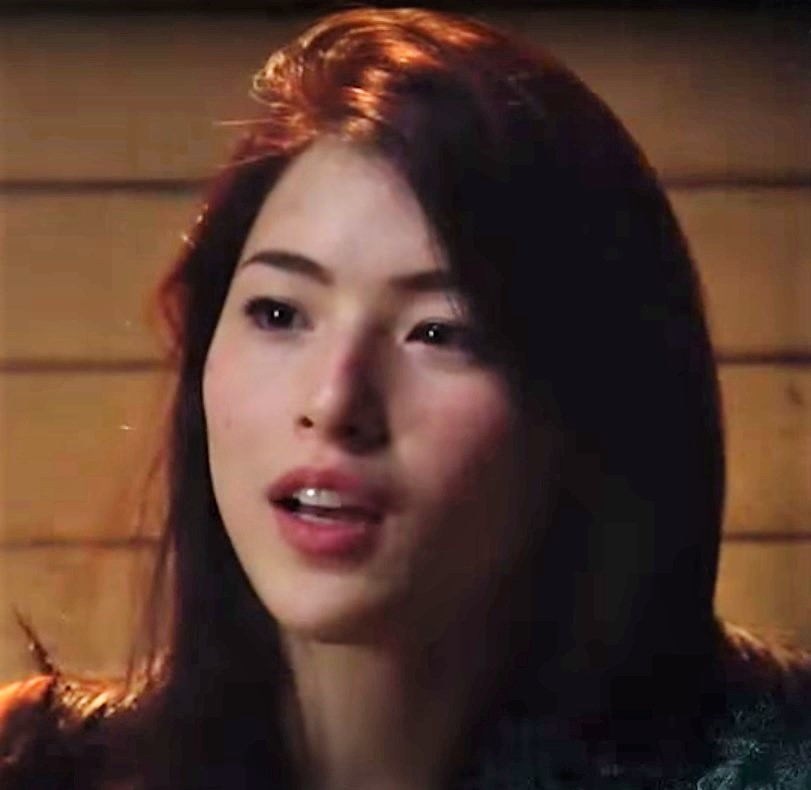
Kylie Padilla

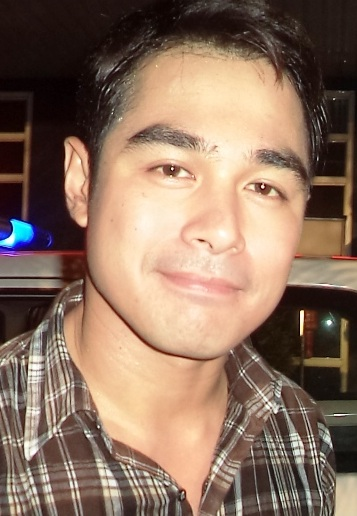
Benjamin Alves

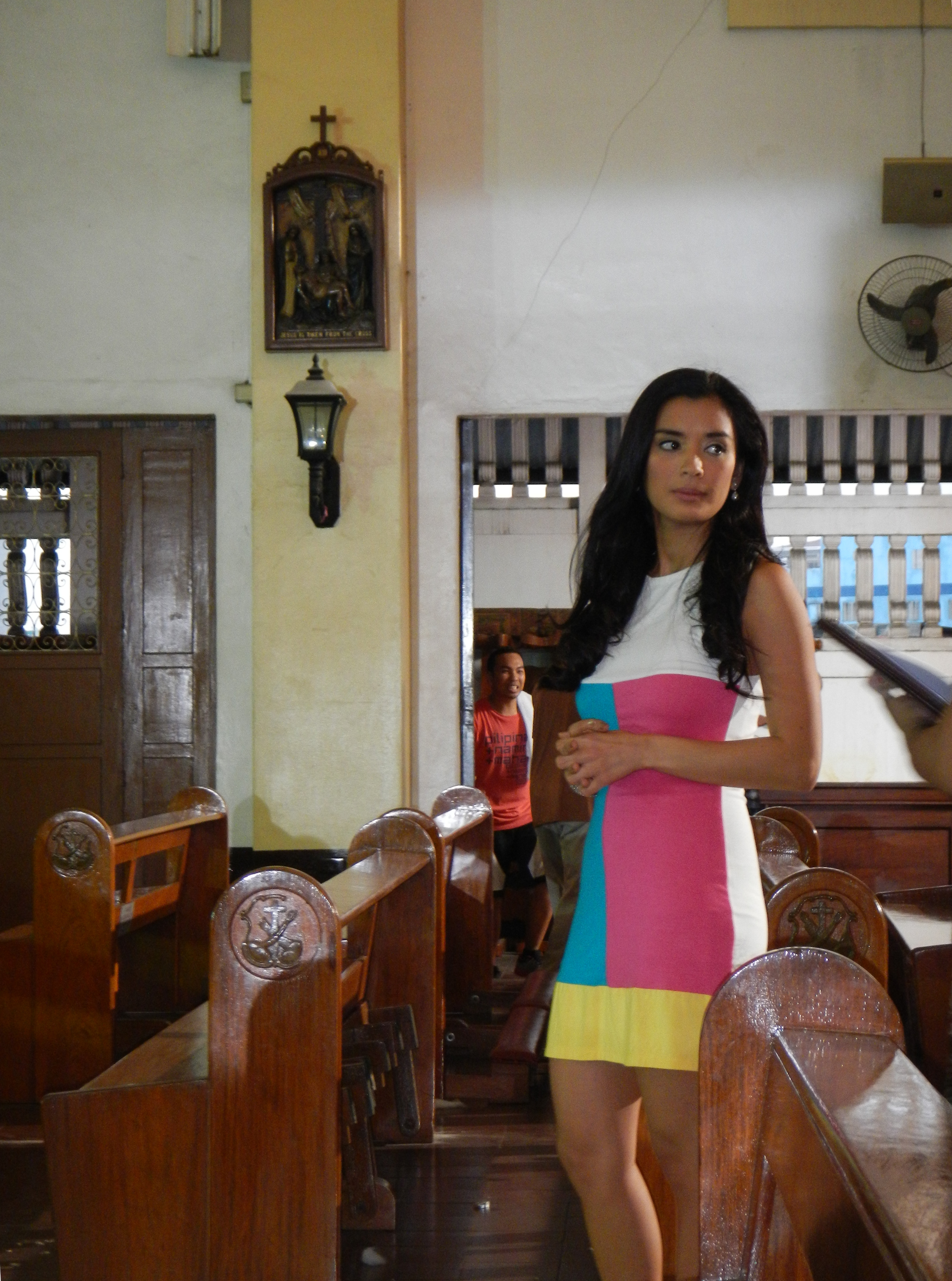
Michelle Madrigal

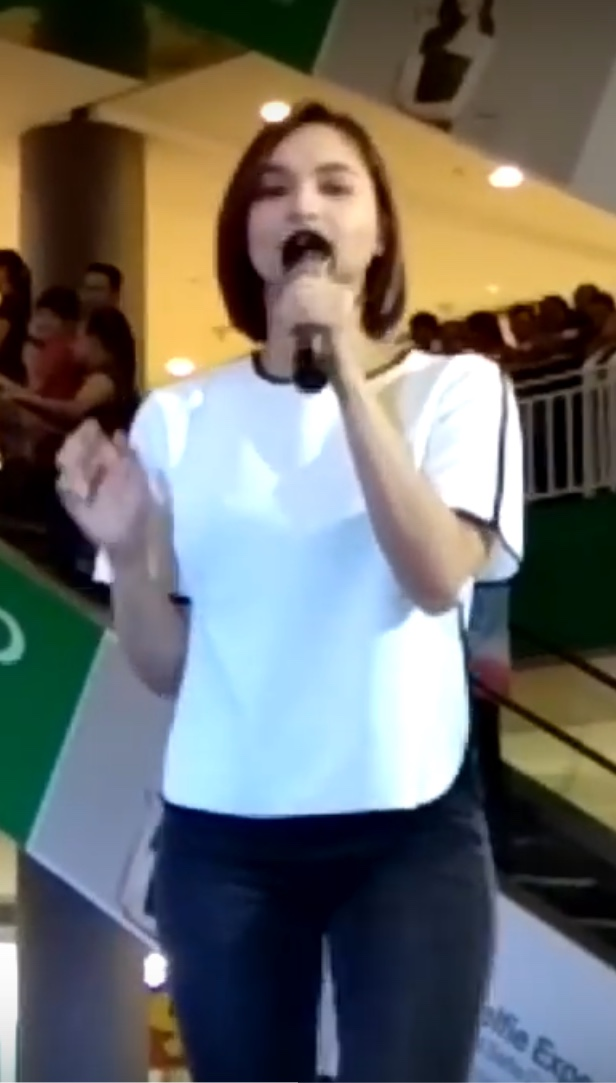
Ryza Cenon

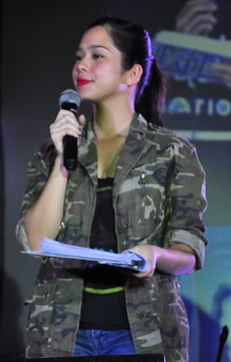
Saab Magalona

Lead cast

- Kylie Padilla as Ada / Angel

Supporting cast

- Geoff Eigenmann as Migo "Miggy" Salva
- Benjamin Alves as Bok / Agalon
- Mikael Daez as Falco
- Jean Garcia as Larka / Lupe
- Michelle Madrigal as Garuda
- Ryza Cenon as Mikay
- Chynna Ortaleza as Janelle
- Saab Magalona as Robin Abrientos
- Maureen Larrazabal as Jinky
- Jestoni Alarcon as Simon
- Dante Rivero as Uwakro

Guest cast

- Neil Ryan Sese as Kestrel
- Anica Tindoy as younger Ada
- Josh Clement Eugenio as younger Miggy
- Frances Makil-Ignacio as Teray
- Kris Bernal as Berbola
- Solenn Heussaff as Daiana
- Katrina Halili as Theresa
- Isay Alvarez as Annaliza Salva
- Arkin Magalona as Mikel
- Patricia Ysmael as Wendy
- Marc Acueza as Leon
- Mike "Pekto" Nacua as Hugho
- Timmy Cruz as Calisay
- Dianne Hernandez as Maya
- Carme Sanchez as Ima Pepita
- Angie Ferro as Uraculo
- JC Tiuseco as Heron
- Daniella Amable as Migo's niece
- Miko Zarasadias as Migo's nephew
- Buboy Villar as Jerry
- RJ Padilla as Rocco
- Roldan Aquino as Gregorio Abrientos
- Diva Montelaba as Raya

== Ratings ==
According to AGB Nielsen Philippines' Mega Manila household television ratings, the pilot episode of Adarna earned an 18.5% rating. The final episode scored a 20.8% rating.
