= List of action films of the 2000s =

This is chronological list of action films originally released in the 2000s. Some films are of hybrid genres, including horror, comedy and science fiction films; the list should attempt to document films which are more closely related to action, even if they blend genres.

== 2000 ==
| Title | Director | Cast | Country | Subgenre/notes |
|---|---|---|---|---|
2000
| 2000 AD | Gordon Chan | | Hong Kong | |
| The 6th Day | Roger Spottiswoode | Arnold Schwarzenegger, Tony Goldwyn, Michael Rapaport | United States | Action thriller |
| The Art of War | Christian Duguay | Wesley Snipes, Anne Archer, Maury Chaykin | United States | Action thriller |
| Bait | Antoine Fuqua | Jamie Foxx, David Morse, Kimberly Elise | United States | |
| Battle Royale | Kinji Fukasaku | Tatsuya Fujiwara, Aki Maeda, Tarō Yamamoto | Japan | Action thriller |
| Battlefield Earth | Roger Christian | John Travolta, Barry Pepper | United States | Science fiction action |
| Blood: The Last Vampire | Hiroyuki Kitabuko | Youki Kudo, Joe Romersa | Japan | Anime action horror |
| Charlie's Angels | McG | Cameron Diaz, Drew Barrymore, Lucy Liu | United States | |
| China Strike Force | Stanley Tong | Aaron Kwok, Noriko Fujiwara, Wang Lee Hom | Hong Kong | |
| Col. Elmer Jamias: Barako ng Maynila | Toto Natividad | Jinggoy Estrada, Angelu de Leon, John Regala, Jeffrey Santos, Melissa Mendez | Philippines | Biographical action |
| Crouching Tiger, Hidden Dragon | Ang Lee | Chow Yun-fat, Michelle Yeoh, Zhang Ziyi | Taiwan | Martial arts film |
| Ang Dalubhasa | Ronwaldo Reyes | Fernando Poe Jr., Nanette Medved, Maritoni Fernandez, Cris Villonco, Paquito Diaz | Philippines | |
| The Duel | Andrew Lau | Andy Lau, Ekin Cheng, Nick Cheung | Hong Kong | Martial arts film |
| Ex-Con | Toto Natividad | Victor Neri, Noel Trinidad, Derek Dee, Alex Cortez, Rica Peralejo | Philippines | |
| Faust: Love of the Damned | Brian Yuzna | Mark Frost, Isabel Brooke, Jeffrey Combs | Spain | Action thriller |
| Get Carter | Stephen Kay | Sylvester Stallone, Miranda Richardson, Michael Caine | United States | Action thriller |
| Gojoe: Spirit War Chronicle | Sogo Ishii | Tadanobu Asano, Masatoshi Nagase, Daisuke Ryu | Japan | |
| Gone in 60 Seconds | Dominic Sena | Nicolas Cage, Angelina Jolie, Giovanni Ribisi | United States | |
| Jiang Hu: The Triad Zone | Dante Lam | Tony Leung Kar-Fai, Sandra Ng, Anthony Wong | Hong Kong | |
| Mission: Impossible 2 | John Woo | Tom Cruise, Dougray Scott, Thandiwe Newton | United States | |
| Pag Oras Mo, Oras Mo Na | Augusto Salvador | Phillip Salvador, Sunshine Cruz, Joko Diaz, Ace Espinosa, Jun Aristorenas | Philippines | |
| Palaban | Toto Natividad | Rudy Fernandez, Ara Mina, Jude Estrada, Daisy Reyes, Bembol Roco | Philippines | |
| The Patriot | Roland Emmerich | Mel Gibson, Heath Ledger, Jason Isaacs | United States | Action drama |
| Ping Lacson: Super Cop | Toto Natividad | Rudy Fernandez, Lorna Tolentino, Ricky Davao, Glydel Mercado, Ace Espinosa | Philippines | Biographical action |
| Romeo Must Die | Andrzej Bartkowiak | Jet Li, Aaliyah, Edoardo Ballerini | United States | |
| Shaft | John Singleton | Samuel L. Jackson, Vanessa Williams, Jeffrey Wright | United States | |
| Shanghai Noon | Tom Dey | Jackie Chan, Owen Wilson, Lucy Liu | United States | |
| Sugo ng Tondo | Jose "Kaka" Balagtas | Joko Diaz, Patricia Javier, Raymond Bagatsing, Maureen Larrazabal, Rommel Montano | Philippines | |
| Taxi 2 | Gérard Krawczyk | Samy Naceri, Frederic Diefenthal, Emma Sjöberg | France | |
| Time and Tide | Tsui Hark | Nicholas Tse, Wu Bai, Anthony Wong | Hong Kong | |
| Titan A.E. | Don Bluth, Gary Goldman | | United States | Science fiction action |
| Tokyo Raiders | Jingle Ma | Tony Leung Chiu-Wai, Ekin Cheng, Kelly Chen | Hong Kong | |
| Vampire Hunter D: Bloodlust | Yoshiyaki Kawajiri | Pamela Segall, John DiMaggio, Dwight Schultz | Japan | Animated film |
| Versus | Ryuhei Kitamura | Tak Sakaguchi, Hideo Sakaki, Chieko Misaka | Japan | |
| Vertical Limit | Martin Campbell | Chris O'Donnell, Bill Paxton, Robin Tunney, Scott Glenn | United States | |
| Whiteout | Setsuro Wakamatsu | Yūji Oda, Ken Ishiguro | Japan | Action thriller |
| X-Men | Bryan Singer | Hugh Jackman, Patrick Stewart, Ian McKellen | United States | |

== 2001 ==
| Title | Director | Cast | Country | Subgenre/notes |
|---|---|---|---|---|
2001
| 3000 Miles to Graceland | Demien Lichtenstein | Kurt Russell, Kevin Costner, Courteney Cox Arquette | United States | |
| The Accidental Spy | Teddy Chan | Jackie Chan, Eric Tsang, Vivian Hsu | Hong Kong | |
| Alas-Dose | Augusto Salvador | Cesar Montano, Christopher de Leon, Sunshine Cruz, Behn Cervantes, Patricia Javier | Philippines | |
| Behind Enemy Lines | John Moore | Gene Hackman, Owen Wilson | United States | |
| Brotherhood of the Wolf | Christophe Gans | Samuel Le Bihan, Mark Dacascos, Émilie Dequenne | France | Martial arts film |
| Bukas, Babaha ng Dugo | Baldo Marro | Lito Lapid, Via Veloso, Emilio Garcia, Kristine Mangle, Sharla Tolentino | Philippines | |
| Bullets of Love | Andrew Lau | Ronald Cheng, Leon Lai, Asaka Seto | Hong Kong | |
| Cowboy Bebop: The Movie | Shinichiro Watanabe | | Japan | |
| Double Take | George Gallo | Orlando Jones, Eddie Griffin, Edward Herrmann | United States | Action comedy |
| Driven | Renny Harlin | Sylvester Stallone, Burt Reynolds, Kip Pardue | United States | |
| Dugong Aso: Mabuting Kaibigan, Masamang Kaaway | Lito Lapid | Mark Lapid, Kristine Hermosa, Ace Espinosa, Jess Lapid Jr., Lito Lapid | Philippines | |
| Exit Wounds | Andrzej Bartkowiak | Steven Seagal, DMX, Isaiah Washington | United States | |
| The Fast and the Furious | Rob Cohen | Paul Walker, Vin Diesel, Michelle Rodriguez | United States | |
| Formula 51 | Ronny Yu | Samuel L. Jackson, Robert Carlyle, Emily Mortimer | United Kingdom; Canada | |
| Fulltime Killer | Johnnie To | Andy Lau, Takashi Sorimachi, Simon Yam | Hong Kong | |
| Ghosts of Mars | John Carpenter | Ice Cube, Natasha Henstridge, Jason Statham | United States | |
| Hindi Sisiw ang Kalaban Mo | Roland Ledesma | Ronald Gan Ledesma, Roi Vinzon, Zoren Legaspi, Rita Magdalena, Ervin Mateo | Philippines | |
| Jesus Christ Vampire Hunter | Lee Demarbre | Phil Caracas, Murielle Varhelyi, Jeff Moffet | Canada | Action comedy |
| Kaaway Hanggang Hukay | Joey del Rosario | Phillip Salvador, Ina Raymundo, Edu Manzano, Robert Arevalo, Bob Soler | Philippines | |
| Kiss of the Dragon | Chris Nahon | Jet Li, Bridget Fonda | France; United States | Action thriller |
| A Knight's Tale | Brian Helgeland | Heath Ledger | United States | |
| Masikip Na ang Mundo Mo, Labrador | Baldo Marro | Lito Lapid, Isabel Granada, Ricardo Cepeda, Ruel Vernal, John Apacible | Philippines | |
| The Musketeer | Peter Hyams | Catherine Deneuve, Mena Suvari, Stephen Rea | United States | |
| My Wife Is a Gangster | Jo Jin-kyu | Shin Eun-kyung, Park Sang-myun, Ahn Jae-mo | South Korea | |
| The One | James Wong | Jet Li, Carla Gugino, Delroy Lindo | United States | |
| Onmyoji | Yōjirō Takita | Mansai Nomura, Hideaki Itō, Hiroyuki Sanada | Japan | Martial arts film |
| Ooops, Teka Lang... Diskarte Ko 'To! | Jose N. Carreon | Robin Padilla, Claudine Barretto, Tonton Gutierrez, Raymond Bagatsing, Vhong Navarro | Philippines | Action comedy |
| Pootie Tang | Louis C.K. | Lance Crouther, Jennifer Coolidge, Wanda Sykes | United States | Action comedy |
| The Princess Blade | Shinsuke Sato | Hideaki Itō, Yumiko Shaku, Shiro Sano | Japan | |
| Red Shadow | Hiroyuki Nakano | Masanobu Andō, Jun Murakami, Megumi Okina | Japan | |
| Replicant | Ringo Lam | Jean-Claude Van Damme, Michael Rooker | United States | |
| Road to Redemption | Robert Vernon | Pat Hingle, Julie Condra, Leo Rossi, Jay Underwood, Tony Longo, Wes Studi | United States | Action comedy |
| Running Out of Time 2 | Johnnie To, Law Wing-cheung | Lau Ching-Wan, Ekin Cheng, Kelly Lin | Hong Kong | |
| Rush Hour 2 | Brett Ratner | Jackie Chan, Chris Tucker | United States | |
| Shaolin Soccer | Stephen Chow | Stephen Chow, Zhao Wei, Ng Man Tat | Hong Kong | |
| Ticker | Albert Pyun | Steven Seagal, Tom Sizemore, Dennis Hopper | United States | |
| Volcano High | Kim Tae-kyung | Jang Hyuk, Shin Min-ah | South Korea | |
| Wasabi | Gérard Krawczyk | Jean Reno, Ryōko Hirosue, Michel Muller | France | |

== 2002 ==
| Title | Director | Cast | Country | Subgenre/notes |
|---|---|---|---|---|
2002
| The Adventures of Pluto Nash | Ron Underwood | Eddie Murphy | United States | |
| Ang Agimat: Anting-Anting ni Lolo | Augusto Salvador | Ramon "Bong" Revilla Jr., Ramon Revilla Sr., Ramon "Jolo" Revilla III, Mylene Dizon, Carlos Morales | Philippines | Fantasy action |
| Ang Alamat ng Lawin | Ronwaldo Reyes | Fernando Poe Jr., Ina Raymundo, Cathy Villar, Franklin Cristobal, Ryan Yamazaki | Philippines | Fantasy swashbuckler |
| Alive | Ryuhei Kitamura | Koyuki, Erika Oda, Hideo Sakaki | Japan | |
| All About the Benjamins | Kevin Bray | Ice Cube, Mike Epps | United States | |
| Aragami | Ryuhei Kitamura | Takao Osawa, Masaya Kato, Kanae Uotani | Japan | |
| Bad Company | Joel Schumacher | Chris Rock, Anthony Hopkins | United States | |
| Ballistic: Ecks vs. Sever | Kaos | Lucy Liu, Antonio Banderas, Gregg Henry | United States | |
| Batas ng Lansangan | Ronwaldo Reyes | Fernando Poe Jr., Dina Bonnevie, Roi Vinzon, Robert Arevalo, Ricardo Cepeda | Philippines | |
| Black Mask 2: City of Masks | Tsui Hark | Andy On, Traci Lords, Jon Polito | Hong Kong | |
| Blade II | Guillermo del Toro | Wesley Snipes, Kris Kristofferson, Ron Perlman | United States | |
| Bloody Mallory | Julien Magnat | Olivia Bonamy, Adria Collado, Jeffrey Ribier | France | |
| The Bourne Identity | Doug Liman | Matt Damon, Franka Potente, Clive Owen | United States | |
| Bro, Kahit Saan Enkuwentro | Roland Ledesma | Eddie Garcia, Ronald Gan Ledesma, Dante Rivero, Eddie Gutierrez, Alma Concepcion | Philippines | |
| Chinese Odyssey 2002 | Jeffrey Lau | Tony Leung Chiu-Wai, Faye Wong, Vicki Zhao Wei | Hong Kong | |
| Collateral Damage | Andrew Davis | Arnold Schwarzenegger, Elias Koteas, Francesca Neri | United States | |
| Dead or Alive: Final | Takashi Miike | Show Aikawa, Riki Takeuchi | Japan | Science fiction action |
| Derailed | Bob Misiorowsky | Jean-Claude Van Damme, Laura Elena Harring, Tomas Arana | United States | |
| Die Another Day | Lee Tamahori | Pierce Brosnan, Halle Berry | United Kingdom | |
| Diskarte | Edgardo "Boy" Vinarao | Rudy Fernandez, Ara Mina, Tirso Cruz III, Emilio Garcia, Joonee Gamboa | Philippines | |
| Equilibrium | Kurt Wimmer | Christian Bale, Emily Watson, Taye Diggs | United States | Science fiction action |
| Extreme Ops | Christian Duguay | Devon Sawa, Bridgette Wilson-Sampras, Rupert Graves | United States | |
| Flying Dragon, Leaping Tiger | Allen Lan | Sammo Hung, Cheng Pei-pei, Fan Siu-Wong | Hong Kong | |
| Gangsters | Olivier Marchal | Richard Anconina, Anne Parillaud, Gérald Laroche | France; Belgium | |
| Half Past Dead | Don Michael Paul | Steven Seagal, Morris Chestnut, Ja Rule | United States | |
| Hanggang Kailan Ako Papatay para Mabuhay | Roland Ledesma | Ronald Gan Ledesma, Eddie Gutierrez, Rey Roldan, Brando Legaspi, Alvin Anson | Philippines | |
| Hari ng Selda: Anak ni Baby Ama 2 | Deo J. Fajardo Jr. | Robin Padilla, Johnny Delgado, Angelika Dela Cruz, Rommel Padilla, Raven Villanueva | Philippines | |
| Hero | Zhang Yimou | Jet Li, Tony Leung Chiu-Wai, Maggie Cheung | China; Hong Kong | Martial arts film |
| Hula Mo, Huli Ko | Edgardo "Boy" Vinarao | Rudy Fernandez, Rufa Mae Quinto, Carlos Morales, Mike Gayoso, Alvin Anson | Philippines | |
| Huwag Mong Takasan ang Batas | Karlo Montero | Rommel Padilla, Ynez Veneracion, Jorge Estregan, Sara Gomez, Karen Villar | Philippines | |
| Kilabot at Kembot | Augusto Salvador | Ramon 'Bong' Revilla Jr., Assunta de Rossi, Roi Vinzon, Long Mejia, Bryan Revilla | Philippines | |
| Mano Mano 2: Ubusan ng Lakas | Ronn-Rick | Ronnie Ricketts, Mariz, Klaudia Koronel, Dick Israel, Rez Cortez | Philippines | |
| Men in Black II | Barry Sonnenfeld | Tommy Lee Jones, Will Smith, Lara Flynn Boyle | United States | |
| Minority Report | Steven Spielberg | Tom Cruise, Colin Farrell, Samantha Morton | United States | Science fiction action mystery |
| Muscle Heat | Ten Shimoyama | Kane Kosugi, Show Aikawa, Masaya Kato, Naoto Takenaka | Japan | Martial arts film |
| Naked Weapon | Tony Ching | Maggie Q, Anya, Daniel Wu | Hong Kong | |
| The Nest | Florent Emilio Siri | Samy Naceri, Benoît Magimel, Nadia Farès | France | |
| Old Men in New Cars | Lasse Spang Olsen | Kim Bodnia, Tomas Villum Jensen, Nikolaj Lie Kaas | Denmark | |
| Pistolero | | Jeric Raval, Joanne Miller, John Apacible, Ramon Zamora, Orestes Ojeda | Philippines | Fantasy action |
| The Red Siren | Olivier Megaton | Jean-Marc Barr, Alexandra Negrao, Asia Argento | France | |
| Reign of Fire | Rob Bowman | Christian Bale, Matthew McConaughey | United States | |
| Resident Evil | Paul W. S. Anderson | Milla Jovovich, Michelle Rodriguez, Eric Mabius | United Kingdom; Germany | Science fiction action |
| Returner | Takashi Yamazaki | Takeshi Kaneshiro, Anne Suzuki, Kirin Kiki | Japan | Science fiction action |
| Sabayan sa Laban | Eugene Asis | Carlos Morales, Via Veloso, Jeffrey Santos, Stella L, Paquito Diaz | Philippines | |
| The Scorpion King | Chuck Russell | Dwayne Johnson, Michael Clarke Duncan, Kelly Hu | United States; Germany; Belgium | |
| So Close | Corey Yuen | Shu Qi, Zhao Wei, Karen Mok | United Kingdom; Hong Kong | |
| Spider-Man | Sam Raimi | Tobey Maguire, Willem Dafoe, Kirsten Dunst | United States | Superhero |
| Star Trek: Nemesis | Stuart Baird | Patrick Stewart | United States | Science fiction action |
| Star Wars Episode II: Attack of the Clones | George Lucas | Ewan McGregor, Hayden Christensen, Natalie Portman | United States | Space opera action |
| Steal | Gérard Pirès | Stephen Dorff, Natasha Henstridge, Bruce Payne | Canada; France; United States | |
| The Sum of All Fears | Phil Alden Robinson | Ben Affleck, Morgan Freeman, Liev Schreiber | United States | Action thriller |
| Sympathy for Mr. Vengeance | Park Chan-wook | Song Kang-ho, Shin Ha-kyun, Bae Doona | South Korea | Action thriller |
| Tongan Ninja | Jason Stutter | Jemaine Clement, Sam Manu, Linda Tseng | New Zealand | Action comedy |
| The Transporter | Corey Yuen | Jason Statham, Shu Qi, François Berléand | France; United States | |
| Tsui Hark's Vampire Hunters | Wellson Chin | Ken Chang, Michael Chow Man-kin, Lam Suet | Hong Kong; Japan; Netherlands | |
| The Tuxedo | Kevin Donovan | Jackie Chan, Jennifer Love Hewitt | United States | |
| Undercover Brother | Malcolm D. Lee | Eddie Griffin, Chris Kattan, Aunjanue Ellis | United States | Action comedy |
| XXX | Rob Cohen | Vin Diesel, Asia Argento | United States | |
| Yesterday | Jeong Yoon-soo | Choi Min-soo, Kim Seung-woo | South Korea | |

== 2003 ==
| Title | Director | Cast | Country | Subgenre/notes |
|---|---|---|---|---|
2003
| 2 Fast 2 Furious | John Singleton | Paul Walker, Tyrese Gibson, Eva Mendes | United States | |
| Bad Boys II | Michael Bay | Martin Lawrence, Will Smith, Jordi Mollà | United States | |
| Belly of the Beast | Ching Siu Tung | Steven Seagal | United States | |
| Bertud ng Putik | Marlon Bautista, Augusto Salvador | Ramon "Bong" Revilla Jr., Roi Vinzon, Regine Tolentino, Rochelle "SexBomb" Pangilinan, Michelle Estevez | Philippines | Fantasy action |
| Biker Boyz | Reggie Rock Bythewood | Laurence Fishburne, Derek Luke, Orlando Jones | United States | |
| Bulletproof Monk | Paul Hunter | Chow Yun-fat, Seann William Scott, Jaime King | United States | |
| Captain Barbell | Mac Alejandre | Ramon "Bong" Revilla Jr., Ogie Alcasid, Regine Velasquez, Albert Martinez, Rufa Mae Quinto | Philippines | Superhero |
| Charlie's Angels: Full Throttle | McG | Cameron Diaz, Drew Barrymore, Lucy Liu | United States | |
| The Core | Jon Amiel | Aaron Eckhart, Hilary Swank, Delroy Lindo | United States | |
| Cradle 2 the Grave | Andrzej Bartkowiak | Jet Li, DMX, Mark Dacascos | United States | |
| Daredevil | Mark Steven Johnson | Ben Affleck, Jennifer Garner, Colin Farrell | United States | Superhero |
| Drunken Monkey | Lau Kar-Leung | Lau Kar-Leung, Chik Kun Kwan, Jason Wu | Hong Kong | |
| Fantastic Man | Tony Y. Reyes | Vic Sotto, Ara Mina, Michael V., Zoren Legaspi, Leo Martinez | Philippines | Superhero |
| The Hebrew Hammer | Jonathan Kesselman | Adam Goldberg, Andy Dick, Judy Greer | United States | Action comedy |
| Heroic Duo | Benny Chan | Leon Lai Ming, Ekin Cheng, Francis Ng | Hong Kong | |
| Hollywood Homicide | Ron Shelton | Harrison Ford, Josh Hartnett, Lena Olin | United States | |
| House of the Dead | Uwe Boll | Jonathan Cherry, Tyron Leitso, Clint Howard | Germany; United States; Canada | Action thriller |
| Hulk | Ang Lee | Eric Bana, Jennifer Connelly, Sam Elliott | United States | |
| The Hunted | William Friedkin | Tommy Lee Jones, Benicio del Toro, Connie Nielsen | United States | Action thriller |
| In Hell | Ringo Lam | Jean-Claude Van Damme, Lawrence Taylor, Marnie Alton | United States | |
| Kill Bill: Volume 1 | Quentin Tarantino | Uma Thurman, Lucy Liu, Vivica A. Fox | United States | |
| Lara Croft Tomb Raider: The Cradle of Life | Jan de Bont | Angelina Jolie, Gerard Butler, Ciarán Hinds | United States | |
| Lastikman | Tony Y. Reyes | Vic Sotto, Donita Rose, Michelle Bayle, Anne Curtis, Jeffrey Quizon | Philippines | Superhero |
| The League of Extraordinary Gentlemen | Steve Norrington | Sean Connery, Shane West, Stuart Townsend | United States | |
| Looking for Mr. Perfect | Ringo Lam | Shu Qi, Andy On, Simon Yam | Hong Kong | |
| A Man Apart | F. Gary Gray | Vin Diesel, Timothy Olyphant | United States | Action thriller |
| Masamang Ugat | Wilfredo Milan | Eddie Garcia, Ace Vergel, Victor Neri, Mikey Arroyo, Maui Taylor | Philippines | |
| The Matrix Reloaded | Andy Wachowski, Larry Wachowski | Keanu Reeves, Carrie-Anne Moss, Laurence Fishburne | United States | Science fiction action |
| The Matrix Revolutions | Andy Wachowski, Larry Wachowski | Keanu Reeves, Carrie-Anne Moss, Laurence Fishburne | United States | Science fiction action |
| The Medallion | Gordon Chan | Jackie Chan, Lee Evans, Claire Forlani | Hong Kong; United States | |
| Moon Child | Takahisa Zeze | Hideto Takarai, Gackt Camui | Japan | |
| National Security | Dennis Dugan | Martin Lawrence, Steve Zahn | United States | |
| Once Upon a Time in Mexico | Robert Rodriguez | Antonio Banderas, Salma Hayek, Johnny Depp | United States | |
| Ong-Bak: Muay Thai Warrior | Prachya Pinkaew | Tony Jaa, Petchtai Wongkamlao, Pumwaree Yodkamol | Thailand | |
| Onmyoji 2 | | Mansai Nomura | Japan | Martial arts film |
| Paycheck | John Woo | Ben Affleck, Aaron Eckhart, Uma Thurman, Paul Giamatti | United States | |
| Pirates of the Caribbean: The Curse of the Black Pearl | Gore Verbinski | Johnny Depp, Orlando Bloom, Keira Knightley | United States | Action adventure |
| PTU | Johnnie To | Simon Yam, Lam Suet, Ruby Wong | Hong Kong | |
| The Rundown | Peter Berg | Dwayne Johnson, Seann William Scott | United States | |
| Running on Karma | Johnnie To, Wai Ka-fai | Andy Lau, Cecilia Cheung, Cheung Siu Fai | China; Hong Kong | |
| Shanghai Knights | David Dobkin | Jackie Chan, Owen Wilson | United States | |
| S.W.A.T. | Clark Johnson | Samuel L. Jackson, Colin Farrell, Michelle Rodriguez | United States | |
| The Spy Dad | Wong Jing | | Hong Kong | |
| Sword in the Moon | Kim Ui-seok | Choi Min-soo, Cho Jae-hyun, Kim Bo-kyung | South Korea | |
| Taxi 3 | Gérard Krawczyk | Samy Naceri, Frederic Diefenthal, Emma Sjöberg | France | |
| Tears of the Sun | Antoine Fuqua | Bruce Willis, Monica Bellucci | United States | |
| Terminator 3: Rise of the Machines | Jonathan Mostow | Arnold Schwarzenegger, Nick Stahl | United States | Science fiction action |
| Timeline | Richard Donner | Paul Walker, Frances O'Connor | United States | |
| Tube | Beak Woon-hak (or Baek Woon-hak) | Kim Suk-hoon, Bae Doona, Park Sang-min | South Korea | Action thriller |
| The Twins Effect | Dante Lam | Charlene Choi, Gillian Chung | Hong Kong | |
| Underworld | Len Wiseman | Kate Beckinsale, Scott Speedman | United States | |
| Warriors of Heaven and Earth | He Ping | Jiang Wen, Kiichi Nakai, Wang Xueqi | China | |
| When Eagles Strike | Cirio H. Santiago | Christian Boeving, Stacy Keach, Eddie Garcia, Rey Malonzo, Monsour del Rosario | United States; Philippines | |
| X2 | Bryan Singer | Patrick Stewart, Hugh Jackman, Ian McKellen | United States | |
| You and Me Against the World | Jose N. Carreon | Robin Padilla, Kris Aquino, Elizabeth Burton, Mark Anthony Fernandez, Gary Estrada | Philippines | |
| Zatōichi | Beat Takeshi Kitano | Beat Takeshi Kitano, Tadanobu Asano, Michiyo Okusa | Japan | |

== 2004 ==
| Title | Director | Cast | Country | Subgenre/notes |
|---|---|---|---|---|
2004
| Alien vs. Predator | Paul W. S. Anderson | Sanaa Lathan, Raoul Bova, Lance Henriksen | United States | |
| Anacondas: The Hunt for the Blood Orchid | Dwight H. Little | Johnny Messner, KaDee Strickland, Matthew Marsden | United States | |
| Appleseed | Shinji Aramaki | | Japan | |
| Astigmatism | Jon Red | Robin Padilla, Albert Martinez, Francis M, Jeffrey Quizon, Alessandra de Rossi | Philippines | Action crime |
| Blade: Trinity | David S. Goyer | Wesley Snipes, Kris Kristofferson, Jessica Biel | United States | Superhero |
| Blast! | Anthony Hickox | Eddie Griffin | United States | |
| Blueberry | Jan Kounen | Vincent Cassel, Juliette Lewis, Michael Madsen | Mexico; United Kingdom; France | |
| The Bodyguard | Petchtai Wongkamlao | Petchtai Wongkamlao, Tony Jaa | Thailand | |
| Born to Fight | Panna Rittikrai | Dan Chupong | Thailand | |
| The Bourne Supremacy | Paul Greengrass | Matt Damon, Franka Potente, Brian Cox | United States; Germany | |
| Breaking News | Johnnie To | Richie Ren, Kelly Chen, Nick Cheung | China; Hong Kong | |
| Casshern | Kazuaki Kiriya | Yusuke Iseya, Kumiko Asō, Toshiaki Karasawa | Japan | Science fiction action |
| Catwoman | Pitof | Halle Berry, Benjamin Bratt, Sharon Stone | United States | |
| Collateral | Michael Mann | Tom Cruise, Jamie Foxx, Jada Pinkett Smith | United States | |
| District B13 | Pierre Morel | Cyril Raffaelli, David Belle, Tony D'Amario | France | |
| Enter the Phoenix | Stephen Fung | Eason Chan, Karen Mok, Stephen Fung | Hong Kong | |
| Gagamboy | Erik Matti | Vhong Navarro, Jay Manalo, Aubrey Miles, Long Mejia, Bearwin Meily | Philippines | Superhero |
| Ghost in the Shell 2: Innocence | Mamoru Oshii | | Japan | Science fiction action |
| Hellboy | Guillermo del Toro | Ron Perlman, John Hurt, Selma Blair | United States | Fantasy action |
| House of Flying Daggers | Zhang Yimou | Takeshi Kaneshiro, Zhang Ziyi, Andy Lau Tak-wah | China; Hong Kong | |
| I, Robot | Alex Proyas | Will Smith | United States | Science fiction action |
| Izo | Takashi Miike | Kazuya Nakayama, Takeshi Kitano | Japan | |
| Kill Bill: Volume 2 | Quentin Tarantino | Uma Thurman, David Carradine, Michael Madsen | United States | |
| Kung Fu Hustle | Stephen Chow | Stephen Chow, Yuen Wah, Leung Siu Lung | China; Hong Kong | |
| Lastikman: Unang Banat | Mac Alejandre | Mark Bautista, Sarah Geronimo, Cherie Gil, John Estrada, Danilo Barrios | Philippines | Superhero |
| Lethal | Dustin Rikert | Heather Marie Marsden, Lorenzo Lamas, Frank Zagarino | United States | Action thriller |
| Man on Fire | Tony Scott | Denzel Washington, Dakota Fanning, Christopher Walken | United States | |
| Mano Mano 3: Arnis the Lost Art | Ronn-Rick | Ronnie Ricketts, Mandy Ochoa, Ricardo Cepeda, Gwen Garci, Leila Kuzma | Philippines | |
| New Police Story | Benny Chan | Jackie Chan, Nicholas Tse, Charlie Yeung | China; Hong Kong | |
| Night Watch | Timur Bekmambetov | Konstantin Khabensky, Vladimir Menshov, Valery Zolotukhin | Russia | Action thriller |
| One Nite in Mongkok | Derek Yee | Daniel Wu, Cecilia Cheung, Alex Fong | Hong Kong | |
| The Punisher | Jonathan Hensleigh | Thomas Jane, John Travolta, Will Patton | United States | |
| Resident Evil: Apocalypse | Alexander Witt | Milla Jovovich, Sienna Guillory, Oded Fehr, Mike Epps, Thomas Kretschmann | Germany; United States | Science fiction action |
| Silver Hawk | Jingle Ma | Michelle Yeoh, Luke Goss, Brandon Chang | Hong Kong | |
| Sky Captain and the World of Tomorrow | Kerry Conran | Jude Law, Angelina Jolie, Gwyneth Paltrow, Giovanni Ribisi, Michael Gambon | United States | Science fiction action |
| Spider-Man 2 | Sam Raimi | Tobey Maguire, Kirsten Dunst, James Franco | United States | |
| Taxi | Tim Story | Queen Latifah, Jimmy Fallon, Gisele Bündchen | United States | |
| Throw Down | Johnnie To | Louis Koo, Aaron Kwok, Tony Leung Kar-Fai | Hong Kong; China | Martial arts film |
| Torque | Joseph Kahn | Martin Henderson, Ice Cube, Monet Mazur | United States | |
| Twins Effect II | Corey Yuen, Patrick Leung | Charlene Choi, Gillian Chung | Hong Kong; China | |
| Van Helsing | Stephen Sommers | Hugh Jackman, Kate Beckinsale | United States | |
| Volta | Wenn V. Deramas | Ai-Ai delas Alas, Diether Ocampo, Jean Garcia, Justin Cuyugan, Bobby Andrews | Philippines | Superhero comedy |
| Walking Tall | Kevin Bray | Dwayne Johnson, Johnny Knoxville, Neal McDonough | United States | |
| The White Dragon | Wilson Yip | Cecilia Cheung, Francis Ng, Andy On | Hong Kong | |
| Zebraman | Takashi Miike | Sho Aikawa, Kyōka Suzuki, Teruyoshi Uchimura | Japan | Action comedy |

== 2005 ==
| Title | Director | Cast | Country | Subgenre/notes |
|---|---|---|---|---|
2005
| Æon Flux | Karyn Kusama | Charlize Theron, Marton Csokas, Jonny Lee Miller | United States | |
| Assault on Precinct 13 | Jean-François Richet | Ethan Hawke, Laurence Fishburne, Drea de Matteo | United States | |
| Azumi 2: Death or Love | Shusuke Kaneko | Aya Ueto, Shun Oguri, Chiaki Kuriyama | Japan | |
| Batman Begins | Christopher Nolan | Christian Bale, Michael Caine, Liam Neeson | United States | |
| Black Dawn | Alexander Gruszynski | Steven Seagal, Tamara Davies | United States | |
| BloodRayne | Uwe Boll | Kristanna Loken, Ben Kingsley, Billy Zane | Germany | Action horror |
| Constantine | Francis Lawrence | Keanu Reeves, Rachel Weisz, Shia LaBeouf, Tilda Swinton, Djimon Hounsou | United States | |
| Demon Hunter | Scott Ziehl | Sean Patrick Flannery, Colleen Porch, Billy Drago | United States | |
| Divergence | Benny Chan | Aaron Kwok, Daniel Wu, Ekin Chang | Hong Kong | Action thriller |
| Domino | Tony Scott | Keira Knightley, Mickey Rourke, Edgar Ramirez | United States | |
| Doom | Andrzej Bartkowiak | Karl Urban, The Rock, Rosamund Pike | Czech Republic; Germany; United Kingdom; United States | |
| Dragon Squad | Daniel Lee | Michael Biehn, Lawrence Chou, Eva Huang | Hong Kong | |
| The Dukes of Hazzard | Jay Chandrasekhar | Johnny Knoxville, Seann William Scott, Jessica Simpson | United States | Action comedy |
| Enterpool: S.C.I.A., Senior Citizen in Action | Perry de Guzman, Noli Villar | Palito, Mykell Chan, Gretchen Malalad, Tony Ferrer, Paquito Diaz | Philippines | Action comedy |
| Elektra | Rob Bowman | Jennifer Garner, Goran Visnjic | United States | |
| Fantastic Four | Tim Story | Ioan Gruffudd, Jessica Alba, Chris Evans | United States | |
| Four Brothers | John Singleton | Mark Wahlberg, Tyrese Gibson, André Benjamin | United States | |
| Hostage | Florent Emilio Siri | Bruce Willis | United States | Action thriller |
| House of Fury | Stephen Fung | Charlene Choi, Gillian Chung, Stephen Fung | Hong Kong | |
| Initial D | Andrew Lau, Alan Mak | Jay Chou, Shawn Yue, Chapman To | Hong Kong | |
| Into the Blue | John Stockwell | Paul Walker, Jessica Alba, Scott Caan | United States | |
| The Island | Michael Bay | Ewan McGregor, Scarlett Johansson, Sean Bean | United States | |
| Kung Fu Mahjong | Wong Jing | Yuen Wah, Yuen Qiu | Hong Kong | |
| The Legend of Zorro | Martin Campbell | Antonio Banderas, Catherine Zeta-Jones, Rufus Sewell | United States | |
| Les Chevaliers du ciel | Gérard Pirès | Clovis Cornillac, Benoît Magimel, Géraldine Pailhas | United States | |
| Meatball Machine | Yūdai Yamaguchi, Jur'ichi Yamamoto | Issei Takahashi, Aoba Kawai, Kenichi Kawasaki | Japan | Science fiction |
| Mr. and Mrs. Smith | Doug Liman | Brad Pitt, Angelina Jolie, Vince Vaughn | United States | |
| The Myth | Stanley Tong | Jackie Chan, Kim Hee-sun, Malika Sherawat | China; Hong Kong | |
| Pit Fighter | Jesse V. Johnson | Dominique Vandenberg, Steven Bauer, Stephen Graham, Scott Adkins | United States | Martial arts film |
| The Promise | Chen Kaige | Hiroyuki Sanada, Jang Dong-gun, Cecilia Cheung | United States; China | |
| Sahara | Breck Eisner | Matthew McConaughey, Steve Zahn, Penélope Cruz | United States | |
| Serenity | Joss Whedon | Nathan Fillion, Gina Torres, Alan Tudyk | United States | Science fiction action |
| Seven Swords | Tsui Hark | Donnie Yen, Leon Lai, Charlie Young | South Korea; China; Hong Kong | |
| Sin City | Frank Miller | Bruce Willis, Mickey Rourke, Clive Owen, Benicio del Toro, Jessica Alba | United States | Action thriller |
| SPL: Sha Po Lang | Wilson Yip | Donnie Yen, Sammo Hung, Simon Yam | China; Hong Kong | |
| Star Wars: Episode III – Revenge of the Sith | George Lucas | Hayden Christensen, Ewan McGregor, Samuel L. Jackson | United States | Science fiction action |
| Stealth | Rob Cohen | Josh Lucas, Jessica Biel, Jamie Foxx | United States | |
| Terrorist Hunter | Val Iglesias | Eddie Garcia, Ronald Gan, Dennis Roldan, Jess Sanchez, Maricar de Mesa | Philippines | |
| The Tiger Blade | Theeratorn Siriphunvaraporn | Atsadawut Luangsuntorn, Pimonrat Pisolyabut, Pongpat Wachirabunjong | Thailand | |
| Tom-Yum-Goong | Prachya Pinkaew | Tony Jaa, Petchtai Wongkamlao, Bongkoo Kongmalai | Thailand | |
| Transporter 2 | Louis Leterrier | Jason Statham, Alessandro Gassman, Amber Valletta | France | |
| Unleashed | Louis Leterrier | Jet Li, Morgan Freeman, Bob Hoskins | United Kingdom; United States; France | |
| Uno | Ronn-Rick | Ronnie Ricketts, Monsour del Rosario, Mark Gil, Ricardo Cepeda, Dinky Doo | Philippines | Action thriller |
| War of the Worlds | Steven Spielberg | Tom Cruise, Dakota Fanning, Miranda Otto | United States | Science fiction action |
| XXX: State of the Union | Lee Tamahori | Ice Cube, Willem Dafoe | United States | |

== 2006 ==
| Title | Director | Cast | Country | Subgenre/notes |
|---|---|---|---|---|
2006
| A.I. Assault | Jim Wynorski | Joe Lando, Lisa Locicero, Josh Coxx | United States | Science fiction action |
| Apocalypto | Mel Gibson | Rudy Youngblood, Dalia Hernandez, Jonathan Brewer | United States | Period thriller |
| Apoy sa Dibdib ng Samar | Jose 'Kaka' Balagtas | Mark Lapid, Cristine Reyes, Roi Vinzon, Elizabeth Oropesa, Dick Israel | Philippines | |
| Attack Force | Michael Keusch | Steven Seagal | United States | |
| Batas Militar | Jess Lapid Jr. | Mark Lapid, Mark Anthony Fernandez, Tanya Garcia, Roi Vinzon, Dick Israel | Philippines | |
| A Battle of Wits | Jacob C.L. Cheung | Andy Lau, Ahn Sung-ki, Wang Zhiwen | South Korea; Japan; Hong Kong; China | |
| BloodRayne | Uwe Boll | Kristanna Loken, Michelle Rodriguez | Germany; Canada | |
| Bon Cop, Bad Cop | Érik Canuel | Patrick Huard, Colm Feore | Canada | |
| Casino Royale | Martin Campbell | Daniel Craig, Eva Green, Mads Mikkelsen | Czech Republic; Germany; United Kingdom; United States | |
| Children of Men | Alfonso Cuarón | Clive Owen, Julianne Moore, Michael Caine | United States | Action thriller |
| Cicak Man | Yusry | Saiful Apek, Fasha Sandha, Yusry | Malaysia | Superhero |
| The City of Violence | Ryoo Seung-wan | Jung Doo-hong, Lee Beom-soo | South Korea | |
| Crank | Mark Neveldine, Brian Taylor | Jason Statham, Amy Smart | United States | |
| Curse of the Golden Flower | Zhang Yimou | Chow Yun-fat, Gong Li, Jay Chou | Hong Kong; China | Martial arts film |
| Dead and Deader | Patrick Dinhut | Dean Cain, Guy Torry, Susan Ward | United States | Television film |
| Déjà Vu | Tony Scott | Denzel Washington, Paula Patton, Val Kilmer | United States | Science fiction action |
| DOA: Dead or Alive | Corey Yuen | Holly Valance, Matthew Marsden | United States; Germany; United Kingdom | |
| Dragon Tiger Gate | Wilson Yip | Donnie Yen, Nicholas Tse, Shawn Yue | China; Hong Kong | |
| Dynamite Warrior | Chalerm Wongpim | Dan Chupong, Panna Rittikrai, Leo Putt | Thailand | |
| Election 2 | Johnnie To | Simon Yam, Louis Koo, Wong Tin-lam | Hong Kong | |
| End Game | Andy Cheng | Cuba Gooding, Jr., Angie Harmon, Brian Presley | Canada; United States | |
| Exiled | Johnnie To | Nick Cheung, Simon Yam, Francis Ng | China; Hong Kong | |
| The Fast and the Furious: Tokyo Drift | Justin Lin | Lucas Black, Bow Wow, Nathalie Kelley | United States | |
| Fatal Contact | Dennis Law | Wu Jing, Ronald Cheng, Miki Yeung, Theresa Fu, Ken Lo, Timmy Hung | Hong Kong | Martial arts film |
| Fearless | Ronny Yu | Jet Li, Betty Sun, Dong Yong | China | |
| Firewall | Richard Loncraine | Harrison Ford, Paul Bettany, Virginia Madsen | United States | Action thriller |
| The Guardian | Andrew Davis | Kevin Costner, Ashton Kutcher, Sela Ward | United States | |
| Horrors of War | Peter John Ross, John Whitney | Jon Osbeck, Joe Lorenzo, Daniel Alan Kiely | United States | Science fiction action |
| Jade Warrior | Antti-Jussi Annila | Tommi Eronen, Markku Peltola, Zhang Jingchu | Netherlands; Estonia; Finland; China | |
| Kiltro | Ernesto Diaz Espinoza | Marko Zaror | Chile | |
| Lagot Ka sa Kuya Ko! | Ronn-Rick | Ronnie Ricketts, Mariz Ricketts, Carlos Morales, Angelica Jones, Nadine Samonte | Philippines | Action comedy |
| The Marine | John Bonito | John Cena, Robert Patrick, Kelly Clarkson | United States | |
| Mercury Man | Bhandit Thongdee | Parinya Kiatbusaba | Thailand | |
| Miami Vice | Michael Mann | Colin Farrell, Jamie Foxx, Gong Li | United States | |
| Mission: Impossible III | J. J. Abrams | Tom Cruise, Philip Seymour Hoffman, Ving Rhames | United States | |
| Movin' Too Fast | Eric Chambers | Layla Alexander, Marquita Terry, Matthew Glave, Jack Kehler, Eric Michael Cole. | United States | |
| Poseidon | Wolfgang Petersen | Josh Lucas, Kurt Russell | United States | |
| Rob-B-Hood | Benny Chan | Louis Koo, Gao Yuanyuan, Jackie Chan | China; Hong Kong | |
| Running Scared | Wayne Kramer | Paul Walker, Cameron Bright, Vera Farmiga | Germany; United States | |
| Severance | Christopher Smith | Danny Dyer, Laura Harris, Tim McInnerny | Germany; United Kingdom | Action thriller |
| Smokin' Aces | Joe Carnahan | Ben Affleck, Andy Garcia, Alicia Keys | United States | Action thriller |
| Snakes on a Plane | David R. Ellis | Samuel L. Jackson, Julianna Margulies, Nathan Phillips | United States | |
| Superman Returns | Bryan Singer | Brandon Routh, Kate Bosworth, James Marsden | United States | |
| Tatlong Baraha | Toto Natividad | Lito Lapid, Mark Lapid, Maynard Lapid, Monsour del Rosario, Phoemela Baranda | Philippines | Fantasy action |
| Two Tigers | Sandro Cecca | Andrea Osvart, Selena Khoo, Olivier Pages | Italy | |
| Ultimate Avengers – The Movie | Curt Geda, Steven E. Gordon | Justin Gross, Grey Griffin, Michael Massee | United States | Animated film |
| Ultraviolet | Kurt Wimmer | Milla Jovovich | United States | |
| Underworld: Evolution | Len Wiseman | Kate Beckinsale, Scott Speedman, Tony Curran | United States | |
| Undisputed II: Last Man Standing | Isaac Florentine | Michael Jai White, Scott Adkins, Ben Cross, Eli Danker, Mark Ivanir, Ken Lerner | United States | Martial arts film |
| V For Vendetta | James McTeigue | Natalie Portman, Hugo Weaving, John Hurt | United States; Germany; United Kingdom | Science fiction action |
| X-Men: The Last Stand | Brett Ratner | Hugh Jackman, Halle Berry, Ian McKellen | United States; United Kingdom | |
| Yo-Yo Girl Cop | Kenta Fukasaku | Aya Matsuura, Riki Takeuchi, Rika Ishikawa | Japan | |

== 2007 ==
| Title | Director | Cast | Country | Subgenre/notes |
|---|---|---|---|---|
2007
| 300 | Zack Snyder | Gerard Butler, Lena Headey, Dominic West | United States | |
| Agent X44 | Joyce Bernal | Vhong Navarro, Mariel Rodriguez, Cassandra Ponti, Uma Khouny, Pokwang | Philippines | Spy comedy |
| Aliens vs. Predator: Requiem | Colin Strause, Greg Strause | Steven Pasquale, Reiko Aylesworth, John Ortiz | United States | |
| Black Belt | Shunichi Nagasaki | Akihito Yagi, Tatsuya Naka, Yuji Suzuki | Spain; Japan | |
| The Bourne Ultimatum | Paul Greengrass | Matt Damon, Julia Stiles, David Strathairn | United States | |
| The Condemned | Scott Wiper | "Stone Cold" Steve Austin, Vinnie Jones | United States | |
| El Muerto | Brian Cox | Wilmer Valderrama, Angie Cepeda, Joel David Moore | United States | Action horror |
| Eye in the Sky | Yau Nai-hoi | Simon Yam, Tony Leung Kar-Fai, Kate Tsui | South Korea; Hong Kong | |
| Fantastic Four: Rise of the Silver Surfer | Tim Story | Ioan Gruffudd, Jessica Alba, Chris Evans | United States | |
| Flash Point | Wilson Yip | Donnie Yen, Louis Koo, Collin Chou | Hong Kong; China | |
| Ghost Rider | Mark Steven Johnson | Nicolas Cage, Eva Mendes, Wes Bentley | United States | |
| Hitman | Xavier Gens | Timothy Olyphant, Dougray Scott, Olga Kurylenko | United States | |
| Hot Fuzz | Edgar Wright | Simon Pegg, Nick Frost, Timothy Dalton | United Kingdom | Action comedy |
| Invisible Target | Benny Chan | Nicholas Tse, Shawn Yue, Jaycee Chan | Hong Kong; China | |
| Kill Buljo | Tommy Wirkola | Natasha Angel Dahle, Orjan Gamst, Stig Frode Henriksen | Norway | Action comedy |
| The King of the Mountain | Gonzalo Lopez-Gallego | Leonardo Sbaraglia, Maria Valverde, Thomas Riordan | Spain | Action thriller |
| Lady Ninja Kasumi | Hiroyuki Kawasaki | Mai Nadasaka, Yume Imano, Miyoko Sakura | Japan | |
| Live Free or Die Hard | Len Wiseman | Bruce Willis, Timothy Olyphant, Justin Long | United States | |
| Planet Terror | Robert Rodriguez | Rose McGowan, Freddy Rodriguez, Josh Brolin | United States | Action thriller |
| Postal | Uwe Boll | Zack Ward, Dave Foley, Chris Coppola | Canada; Germany; United States | |
| The Rebel | Charlie Nguyen | Johnny Tri Nguyen, Ngo Thanh Van, Dustin Nguyen | Vietnam; Thailand | |
| Redline | Andy Cheng | Nathan Phillips, Nadia Bjorlin | United States | |
| Reign of the Gargoyles | Chase Parker | Joe Penny, Wes Ramsey, Sean Mahon | United States | Television film |
| Resident Evil: Extinction | Russell Mulcahy | Milla Jovovich, Ali Larter, Oded Fehr, Mike Epps | Germany; United States | Action horror |
| Resiklo | Mark A. Reyes | Ramon "Bong" Revilla Jr., Jennylyn Mercado, Dingdong Dantes, Jolo Revilla, Paolo Contis | Philippines | Science fiction action |
| Rise of the Footsoldier | Julian Gilbey | Ricci Harnett | United Kingdom | |
| Rush Hour 3 | Brett Ratner | Chris Tucker, Jackie Chan, Hiroyuki Sanada | United States | |
| Scorpion | Julien Seri | Clovis Cornillac | French Republic | Martial arts film |
| Seraphim Falls | David Von Ancken | Liam Neeson, Pierce Brosnan | United States; United Kingdom | |
| Shoot 'Em Up | Michael Davis | Clive Owen, Paul Giamatti, Monica Bellucci | United States | |
| Shooter | Antoine Fuqua | Mark Wahlberg, Danny Glover | United States | |
| Spider-Man 3 | Sam Raimi | Tobey Maguire, Kirsten Dunst, James Franco | United States | |
| Superman: Doomsday | Bruce Timm, Lauren Montgomery, Brandon Vietti | Adam Baldwin, Anne Heche, James Marsters | United States | Animated superhero film |
| TMNT | Kevin Munroe | Chris Evans, Sarah Michelle Gellar, Patrick Stewart, Mako | United States; Hong Kong | |
| Tokyo Gore Police | Yoshihiro Nishimura | Eihi Shiina, Itsuji Itao, Yukihide Benny | Japan | |
| Transformers | Michael Bay | Shia LaBeouf, Megan Fox, Josh Duhamel | United States | Science fiction action |
| Triangle | Tsui Hark, Ringo Lam, Johnnie To | Louis Koo, Simon Yam, Sun Hong-Lei | China; Hong Kong | |
| Twins Mission | Kong Tai Hoi | Sammo Hung, Charlene Cho, Gillian Chung | Hong Kong; China | |
| Until Death | Simon Fellows | Jean-Claude Van Damme | United States | |
| War | Phillip Atwell | Jet Li, Jason Statham, John Lone | United States | |
| The Warlords | Peter Chan | Jet Li, Andy Lau, Takeshi Kaneshiro | China; Hong Kong | |

== 2008 ==
| Title | Director | Cast | Country | Subgenre/notes |
|---|---|---|---|---|
2008
| 2012: Doomsday | Nick Everhart | Cliff DeYoung, Dale Midkiff, Ami Dolenz, Sara Tomko, Caroline Amiguet | United States | Christian science fiction disaster |
| Anak ng Kumander | Jose "Kaka" Balagtas | Manny Pacquiao, Ara Mina, Valerie Concepcion, Lara Morena, Rogelio Pacquiao | Philippines | |
| Babylon A.D. | Mathieu Kassovitz | Vin Diesel, Michelle Yeoh, Gérard Depardieu | France; United States | Science fiction action |
| Bangkok Dangerous | Oxide Pang Chun, Danny Pang | Nicolas Cage, Charlie Young, Chakrit Yamnarm | United States | Action thriller |
| Batman: Gotham Knight | Shoujirou Nishimi, Futoshi Higashide, Hiroshi Morioka | Kevin Conroy, Gary Dourdan, David McCallum | United States | Animated superhero film |
| Be a Man! Samurai School | Tak Sakaguchi | Tak Sakaguchi, Shoei, Shintaro Yamada | Japan | |
| Beast Stalker | Dante Lam | Nicholas Tse, Nick Cheung, Zhang Jingchu | Hong Kong | |
| The Chaser | Na Hong-jin | Kim Yoon-seok, Ha Jung-woo, Seo Young-hee | South Korea | Action thriller |
| Chocolate | Prachya Pinkaew | Yanin Wismitanant, Hiroshi Abe, Ammara Siripong | Thailand | |
| Cicakman 2 – Planet Hitam | Yusry Abdul Halim | Saiful Apek, Fasha Sandha, Aznil Hj Nawawi | Malaysia | Superhero film |
| Connected | Benny Chan | Louis Koo, Barbie Shu, Liu Ye | Hong Kong | |
| Cyborg Soldier | John Stead | Rich Franklin, Tiffani Thiessen, Bruce Greenwood | United States | |
| The Dark Knight | Christopher Nolan | Christian Bale, Heath Ledger, Aaron Eckhart | United States; United Kingdom | |
| Death Race | Paul W. S. Anderson | Jason Statham, Tyrese Gibson, Joan Allen | United States | Science fiction action |
| Doomsday | Neil Marshall | Rhona Mitra, Bob Hoskins, Malcolm McDowell | United Kingdom | |
| Eagle Eye | D.J. Caruso | Shia LaBeouf, Michelle Monaghan, Billy Bob Thornton, Rosario Dawson, Michael Chiklis | United States | Science fiction action thriller |
| An Empress and the Warriors | Ching Siu Tung | Donnie Yen, Kelly Chen, Leon Lai | China; Hong Kong | |
| Far Cry | Uwe Boll | Til Schweiger, Emmanuelle Vaugier, Craig Fairbrass | Canada | |
| Fatal Move | Dennis Law | Sammo Hung, Simon Yam, Wu Jing, Danny Lee | Hong Kong | |
| The Forbidden Kingdom | Rob Minkoff | Michael Angarano, Jackie Chan, Jet Li | United States | Martial arts fantasy adventure |
| Get Smart | Peter Segal | Steve Carell, Anne Hathaway, Dwayne Johnson | United States | Action comedy |
| Go Fast | Olivier Van Hoofstadt | Roschdy Zem, Olivier Gourmet, Jean-Michel Fête | France | |
| Hancock | Peter Berg | Will Smith, Charlize Theron, Jason Bateman | United States | Action comedy |
| Hard Revenge Milly | Shimako Sato | | Japan | |
| Hell Ride | Larry Bishop | Larry Bishop, Dennis Hopper, Michael Madsen, Vinnie Jones | United States | |
| Hellboy II: The Golden Army | Guillermo del Toro | Ron Perlman, Selma Blair, Doug Jones | United States | |
| The Hurt Locker | Kathryn Bigelow | Jeremy Renner, Anthony Mackie, Brian Geraghty | United States | Action thriller |
| Ichi | Hiroshi Kuze, Fumihiko Sori | Haruka Avase, Shidou Nakamura, Yōsuke Kubozuka | Japan | |
| The Incredible Hulk | Louis Leterrier | Edward Norton, Liv Tyler, Tim Roth | United States | Superhero |
| Indiana Jones and the Kingdom of the Crystal Skull | Steven Spielberg | Harrison Ford, Cate Blanchett, Shia LaBeouf | United States | Science fiction action adventure |
| Ip Man | Wilson Yip | Donnie Yen, Simon Yam, Hiroyuki Ikeuchi | Hong Kong | |
| Iron Man | Jon Favreau | Robert Downey Jr., Terrence Howard, Jeff Bridges | United States | |
| Justice League: The New Frontier | Dave Bullock | David Boreanaz, Miguel Ferrer, Neal Patrick Harris | United States | Animated superhero film |
| K-20: Legend of the Mask | Shimako Sato | Takeshi Kaneshiro, Takako Matsu, Toru Nakamura | Japan | |
| Kung Fu Panda | John Stevenson, Mark Osborne | Jack Black, Dustin Hoffman, Angelina Jolie | United States | |
| Legendary Assassin | Wu Jing | Wu Jing, Celina Jade, Hui Shiu-hung | Hong Kong | Martial arts film |
| Les Insoumis | Olivier Dazat, Claude-Michel Rome | Richard Berry, Pascal Elbe, Zabou Breitman | France | |
| The Machine Girl | Noboru Iguchi | Minase Yashiro, Asami Miyajima, Ryōsuke Kawamura | United States; Japan | |
| Max Payne | John Moore | Mark Wahlberg, Mila Kunis, Chris O' Donnell | United States | |
| Mutant Chronicles | Simon Hunter | Thomas Jane, Ron Perlman, John Malkovich | United States | Science fiction action |
| Never Back Down | Jeff Wadlow | Sean Faris, Amber Heard, Djimon Hounsou | United States | |
| Ong Bak 2 | Tony Jaa | Tony Jaa, Sorapong Chatri, Sarunyu Wongkrajang | Thailand | |
| Outlander | Howard McCain | James Caviezel, Sophia Myles, Ron Perlman | United States | Science fiction action |
| Pineapple Express | David Gordon Green | Seth Rogen, James Franco, Gary Cole | United States | Action comedy |
| Punisher: War Zone | Lexi Alexander | Ray Stevenson, Dominic West, Julie Benz | Germany; United States | |
| Quantum of Solace | Marc Forster | Daniel Craig, Mathieu Amalric, Jesper Christensen | United States; United Kingdom | |
| Rambo | Sylvester Stallone | Sylvester Stallone, Julie Benz, Matthew Marsden | United States | |
| Redbelt | David Mamet | Chiwetel Ejiofor, Emily Mortimer, Alice Braga | United States | Martial arts film |
| Rough Cut | Jang Hoon | So Ji-sub, Kang Ji-hwan | South Korea | |
| Shaolin Girl | Katsuyuki Motohiro | | Japan | Martial arts film |
| Star Wars: The Clone Wars | Dave Filoni | Matt Lanter, Ashley Eckstein, James Arnold Taylor, Catherine Taber | United States | |
| Street Kings | David Ayer | Keanu Reeves, Forest Whitaker, Hugh Laurie | United States | |
| Taken | Pierre Morel | Liam Neeson, Maggie Grace, Famke Janssen | France | Action thriller |
| Tokyo Gore Police | Yoshihiro Nishimura | Itsuji Itao, Camille LaBry, Shôko Nakahara | Japan; United States | |
| Transporter 3 | Olivier Megaton | Jason Statham, Natalya Rudakova, François Berléand | France | |
| Tropic Thunder | Ben Stiller | Ben Stiller, Robert Downey Jr., Jack Black, Jay Baruchel, Steve Coogan | United States | Action comedy |
| Wanted | Timur Bekmambetov | Angelina Jolie, Morgan Freeman, James McAvoy | Russia; United States | |

== 2009 ==
| Title | Director | Cast | Country | Subgenre/notes |
|---|---|---|---|---|
2009
| 12 Rounds | Renny Harlin | John Cena, Steve Harris, Ashley Scott | United States | |
| Angel of Death | Paul Etheredge | Zoë Bell, Jake Abel, Brian Poth | United States | |
| Assault Girls | Mamoru Oshii | Rinko Kikuchi | Japan | |
| Avatar | James Cameron | Sam Worthington, Sigourney Weaver, Michelle Rodriguez, Giovanni Ribisi, Zoe Saldaña | United States | Science fiction action |
| Bitch Slap | Rick Jacobson | Julia Voth, Erin Cummings, America Olivo | United States | |
| Black Dynamite | Scott Sanders | Michael Jai White, Kym E. Whitley, Tommy Davidson | United States | |
| Black Lightning | Dmitri Kiselev, Aleksandr Voytinskiy | | Russia | |
| The Bleeding | Charlie Picemi | Michael Matthias, Vinnie Jones, DMX | United States | |
| Blood and Bone | Ben Ramsey | Michael Jai White, Julian Sands, Eamonn Walker, Dante Basco | United States | Martial arts film |
| Blood: The Last Vampire | Chris Nahon | Jun Ji-hyun, Allison Miller, Masiela Lusha | France | Action horror |
| Bodyguards and Assassins | Teddy Chan | Donnie Yen, Nicholas Tse, Leon Lai | Hong Kong; China | |
| Clash | Le Thanh Son | Johnny Trí Nguyễn, Veronica Ngo, Hoang Phuc | Vietnam | |
| Coweb | Xiong Xin Xin | Jiang Lui Xia, Sam Lee, Eddie Cheung | Hong Kong | Martial arts film |
| Crank: High Voltage | Mark Neveldine, Brian Taylor | Jason Statham, Amy Smart, Clifton Collins Jr. | United States | |
| District 9 | Neill Blomkamp | Sharlto Copley | United States; New Zealand | Science fiction action |
| District B13 Ultimatum | Patrick Alessandrin | David Belle, Cyril Raffaelli, Philippe Torreton | France | |
| Dragonball Evolution | James Wong | Justin Chatwin, James Marsters, Emmy Rossum | Australia; United States; Hong Kong; United Kingdom | |
| Echelon Conspiracy | Greg Marcks | Shane West, Ving Rhames, Martin Sheen | United States | Action thriller |
| Fast & Furious | Justin Lin | Paul Walker, Vin Diesel, Jordana Brewster | United States | |
| Fighting | Dito Montiel | Channing Tatum, Terrence Howard | United States | |
| Fireball | Thanakorn Pongsuwan | Preeti Barameeanan, Phutharit Prombundarn, Khanutra Chuchuaysuwan | Thailand | |
| G.I. Joe: The Rise of Cobra | Stephen Sommers | Channing Tatum, Joseph Gordon-Levitt, Sienna Miller | United States | |
| Gamer | Mark Neveldine, Brian Taylor | Gerard Butler, Michael C. Hall | United States | Science fiction action |
| Give 'Em Hell, Malone | Russell Mulcahy | Thomas Jane, Ving Rhames, Elsa Pataky | United States | |
| Green Lantern: First Flight | Lauren Montgomery | Christopher Meloni, Victor Garber, Tricia Heifer | United States | Animated superhero film |
| Kung Fu Cyborg | Jeffrey Lau | Eric Tsang, Law Kar-ying, Wu Jing | Hong Kong; China | |
| The Marine 2 | Roel Reiné | Ted DiBiase Jr., Temuera Morrison, Lara Cox, Robert Coleby, Michael Rooker | United States | |
| Marine Boy | Yoon Jong-seok | Kim Kang-woo, Park Si-yeon, Cho Jae-hyun | South Korea | Action thriller |
| Merantau | Gareth Evans | Iko Uwais, Sisca Jessica, Mads Koudal | Indonesia | |
| Mulan | Jingle Ma | Zhao Wei, Yu Rongguang, Chen Kun | China | |
| Ninja | Isaac Florentine | Scott Adkins, Tsuyoshi Ihara, Garick Hagon | United States | |
| Ninja Assassin | James McTeigue | Rain, Naomie Harris, Ben Miles | United States | |
| Ang Panday | Rico Gutierrez, Mac Alejandre | Ramon "Bong" Revilla Jr., Phillip Salvador, Iza Calzado, Geoff Eigenmann, Robert Villar | Philippines | Fantasy action |
| Paul Blart: Mall Cop | Steve Carr | Kevin James, Keir O'Donnell, Jayma Mays | United States | Action comedy |
| Power Kids | Kridsanapong Radchata | Nuntawut Boonrubsub, Sasisa Jindamanee, Phethai Wongkhamlao | Thailand | |
| Push | Paul McGuigan | Chris Evans, Dakota Fanning, Camilla Belle, Djimon Hounsou | United States; Hong Kong | Science fiction action |
| Raging Phoenix | Rashan Limtrakul | Yanin Vismitananda, Patrick Tang, Nui Sandang | Thailand | |
| RoboGeisha | Noboru Iguchi | Yoshihiro Nishimura, Naoto Takenaka, Asami | Japan | Science fiction action |
| Running Turtle | Lee Yeong-woo | Kim Yoon-seok, Jung Kyung-ho | South Korea | |
| Samurai Princess | Kengo Kaji | Aino Kishi, Dai Mizuno, Asuka Katoaka | Japan | Science fiction |
| Sherlock Holmes | Guy Ritchie | Robert Downey Jr., Jude Law, Rachel McAdams | United States | |
| The Sniper | Dante Lam | Richie Jen, Huang Xiaoming, Edison Chen | Hong Kong | |
| Solomon Kane | Michael J. Bassett | James Purefoy, Max von Sydow, Rachel Hurd-Wood, Pete Postlethwaite | France; United Kingdom; Czech Republic | Fantasy action |
| Star Trek | J. J. Abrams | Chris Pine, Zachary Quinto, Eric Bana | United States | Science fiction action |
| The Storm Warriors | Danny Pang, Oxide Pang Chun | Ekin Cheng, Aaron Kwok, Simon Yam | Hong Kong | |
| Street Fighter: The Legend of Chun Li | Andrzej Bartkowiak | Kristin Kreuk, Michael Clarke Duncan, Neal McDonough | United States | |
| Superman/Batman: Public Enemies | Sam Liu | Kevin Conroy, Tim Daly, Clancy Brown | United States | Animated superhero film |
| Surrogates | Jonathan Mostow | Bruce Willis, Radha Mitchell, Rosamund Pike | United States | Action thriller |
| Terminator Salvation | McG | Christian Bale, Sam Worthington, Bryce Dallas Howard, Helena Bonham Carter | United States | Science fiction action |
| The Tournament | Scott Mann | Robert Carlyle, Ving Rhames, Kelly Hu | United States | Action thriller |
| Transformers: Revenge of the Fallen | Michael Bay | Shia LaBeouf, Megan Fox, Josh Duhamel | United States | |
| Turning Point | Herman Yau | Michael Tse, Anthony Wong, Francis Ng | Hong Kong | |
| Underworld: Rise of the Lycans | Patrick Tatopoulos | Rhona Mitra, Bill Nighy, Michael Sheen | United States | |
| Universal Soldier: Regeneration | John Hyams | Jean-Claude Van Damme, Dolph Lundgren, Andrei Arlovski | United States | |
| Vengeance | Johnnie To | Cheung Siu Fai, Johnny Hallyday, Ng Yuk-sau | China; France; Hong Kong | Action thriller |
| Wonder Woman | Lauren Montgomery | Keri Russell, Nathan Fillion, Alfred Molina | United States | Animated superhero film |
| X-Men Origins: Wolverine | Gavin Hood | Hugh Jackman, Ryan Reynolds, Liev Schreiber | United States | |
| Zone of the Dead | Milan Konjević, Milan Todorović | Ken Foree, Kristina Klebe, Emilio Roso | Serbia | Action horror |

== See also ==
- Action films
- Martial arts films
- Swashbuckler films
