= Malvar: Tuloy ang Laban =

Upcoming biographical war film starring Manny Pacquiao

- Directed by: Jose "Kaka" Balagtas
- Written by: Ed Samson
- Based on: Gen. Miguel Malvar and the Philippine Revolution by Edberto Malvar Villegas
- Produced by: Jose Malvar Villegas Jr.; Florita Santos
- Production company: JMV Film Productions
- Distributed by: Star Cinema
- Country: Philippines
- Language: Filipino
- Budget: ₱100 million

Malvar: Tuloy ang Laban (lit. 'Malvar: The Fight Continues') is an unfinished Filipino biographical war film directed by Jose "Kaka" Balagtas and written by Ed Samson. It would have depicted the life of Miguel Malvar, one of the last Filipino generals to surrender in the Philippine–American War. The film's cast included Manny Pacquiao as the titular General Malvar, with Isko Moreno as Andrés Bonifacio and E.R. Ejercito as Emilio Aguinaldo.

Producer Jose Malvar Villegas Jr. began plans for a film about General Malvar in 2000, though it was stalled due to apprehension that the American government, a close ally of the Philippines, could be offended with the work. After Rodrigo Duterte became President of the Philippines in 2016 and favored a more independent foreign policy for the country, Villegas was encouraged to proceed with his plans, with Pacquiao cast as Malvar by mid-2019. Though shooting was intended to take place in Batangas, the eruption of Taal Volcano in the province forced the production to move to Bulacan.

As plans for a Malvar film production became more public in late 2019, controversy arose over the production's lack of sought permission from Malvar's descendants, while the casting of Pacquiao as Malvar was criticized.

== Cast ==
- Manny Pacquiao as Miguel Malvar
  Filipino general in the Philippine–American War. Pacquiao's casting as Malvar was announced on August 27, 2019, by Batangas Governor Hermilando "DoDo" Mandanas during a ceremony declaring him as Batangas' "adopted son". Director Jose "Kaka" Balagtas and Pacquiao have previously worked together on films such as Anak ng Kumander and Basagan ng Mukha.
- Isko Moreno as Andrés Bonifacio
  In September 2019, Pacquiao expressed interest in Judy Ann Santos taking the lead female role, while Mayor Isko Moreno of Manila and ER Ejercito were also strongly considered for other roles in the film. On October 21, Moreno was officially cast as Andres Bonifacio, with his talent fee to be fully donated to the Philippine General Hospital.
- E.R. Ejercito as Emilio Aguinaldo
- Daniel Fernando as Emilio Jacinto
- Jerico Ejercito as Gregorio del Pilar
- Mark Leviste

The full cast was presented at the Great Eastern Hotel's Aberdeen Court in Quezon City on December 22, 2019, with Presidential Spokesperson Salvador Panelo in attendance.

== Production ==
=== Development ===
Producer Jose Malvar Villegas Jr.'s plans for a biographical film about General Miguel Malvar began in 2000, which at the time was stalled for an extended period due to the risk of offending the American government. However, after Rodrigo Duterte became president and advocated for a more independent foreign policy, Villegas was encouraged to proceed with his plans and committed to depicting in the film the atrocities committed during American colonization of the Philippine islands.

=== Filming ===
Malvar was directed by Jose "Kaka" Balagtas and the provincial government of Batangas had involvement in its production. According to Balagtas, filming locations for Malvar would have included the Padre Pio Shrine in Santo Tomas, Batangas and the Bay Laguna, a 40 hectares (99 acres) development were the Malvar Ecumenical and Film World Center would be built. Filming for the trailer began on October 18, 2019.

Villegas Jr., the head of JMV Film Production who reportedly is also a grandson of Malvar, served as the producer of the film. Director Balagtas also doubled as the event producer. Imelda Papin, a singer and songwriter is Malvar's line producer with Florita Santos also involved as a co-producer.

According to Michael Balaguer of the online news site Diaryong Tagalog, shooting locations would have been moved from Batangas to the municipalities of Plaridel and Pandi in Bulacan due to the January 2020 eruption of Taal Volcano. Production was hampered once again by March, this time due to the COVID-19 pandemic which has led to a lockdown of the entire Luzon area on March 17.

The film was intended to be submitted to the 46th edition (2020) of the Metro Manila Film Festival, in addition to other international film festivals, but as of December 2020, it had yet to be completed.

== Controversy ==
The production of Malvar received controversy for the lack of sought permission from any of the descendants of Miguel Malvar other than producer Jose Malvar Villegas Jr. and his historian brother Edberto. Gabriel Malvar, the great grandson of Miguel Malvar, questioned the casting choice for the titular general of the film saying that his grandfather have his name "associated with anyone in politics" since Pacquiao is also an incumbent senator and also noted how Pacquiao's personality would "dominate" the film which he believed would detract the audience's attention from his grandfather's life to Pacquiao.
