= Roldan Aquino =

Filipino actor and director (1942–2014)

Roldán Aquino
- Born: Rolando Desembrana Aquino; May 2, 1942; Alabat Quezon, Philippines
- Died: March 10, 2014 (aged 71); Antipolo City, Philippines
- Other names: Roldán Aquino, Rolly Aquino
- Occupations: Actor, Director
- Years active: 1965–2014
- Spouse: Maria Antonia Rael Tapiru-Aquino

Rolando Desembrana Aquino (May 2, 1942 – March 10, 2014) was a Filipino actor and director, best known for playing antagonist roles in films and television shows. He also became a born-again Evangelical Christian and he was ordained as a pastor of Jesus Lights the Way to the Father's Kingdom Church, Antipolo City, Officiated by Bishop Federico "Butch" Villanueva.

== Career ==
Roldan Aquino is famous being a character actor. He starred in various films including Burlesk Queen (1977), Pikoy Goes to Malaysia (1988) and Lihim ni Madonna (1997). His final films before his death were Manila Kingpin: The Asiong Salonga Story (2011), Tiktik: The Aswang Chronicles (2012), and El Presidente (2012).

== Death ==
He suffered a stroke in January 2014 and underwent surgery on January 20, 2014. He died on March 10, 2014. He is survived by his Children Patricia, Priscilla, Viva and Zekainah.

== Selected filmography ==
=== Film ===
- Cosa Nostra (1965)
- Cabonegro (1966)
- Target Domino (1966)
- Chinatown (1966)
- Nasaan ang Katarungan? (1969)
- Ako'y Tao, May Dugo at Laman! (1970) - Luis
- Sex Sinners (1970)
- Lover for Hire (1970)
- Hey There, Lonely Girl (1970)
- Triagulo (1970)
- Marupok (1970)
- Ina Ko, Patawarin Mo Ako, Ako'y Nagugutom (1970)
- Isla de Amor (1971)
- Aida (1971)
- Luray (1971)
- Aliwan (1971)
- Alimpuyo (1971)
- Inday (1971)
- Nunal sa Balikat (1971)
- Hamog sa Katanghalian (1971)
- Mapaglarong Pag-ibig (1971)
- Ang Pangalan Ko'y Luray (1971)
- The Big Bird Cage (1972) – Revolutionary (uncredited)
- Kung Bakit Kita Minahal (1972)
- Captain Barbell Boom! (1973)
- The Game of Death (1974)
- Sarhento Fofonggay: A, Ewan! (1974) – Kapitan
- Return of the Dragon (1974)
- Bagsik at Kamandag ni Pedro Penduko (1974)
- Dragon Fire (1974)
- The Dragon Force Connection (1974)
- Itong Panagupa (1974)
- Basta't Isipin Mong Mahal Kita (1975)
- The Magnificent Brute (1975)
- O Anong Sarap (1977)
- Kung May Tiyaga, May Nilaga (1975)
- Jack and Jill and John (1975)
- Romeo at Julio (1975)
- Burlesk Queen (1977) - Ander
- Atsay (1978) – Village Casanova
- Scout Ranger (1979)
- Bakit May Pag-ibig Pa? (1979) – Delfin
- Superhand (1980)
- Beloy Montemayor (1986)
- Pikoy Goes to Malaysia (1988)
- Jones Bridge Massacre (Task Force Clabio) (1989)
- Isang Bala, Isang Buhay (1989) – Roldan
- Amok: Patrolman 2 (1989) – Col. Barretto
- Urbanito Dizon: The Most Notorious Gangster in Luzon (1990) – Col. Brandon
- Ibabaon Kita sa Lupa (1990)
- Delta Force 2: The Colombian Connection (1990) – Ramon's Bodyguard #3
- Walang Piring ang Katarungan (1990)
- Hanggang Saan ang Tapang Mo (1990) – Lt. Mendoza
- Alyas Pogi: Birador ng Nueva Ecija (1990) – Big Boy
- Para sa Iyo ang Huling Bala Ko (1991)
- Hindi Palulupig (1991) – Hantik
- Kapag Nag-abot ang Langit at Lupa (1991)
- Magdalena S. Palacol Story (1991)
- Markang Bungo: The Bobby Ortega Story (1991)
- Mahal Ko ang Mister Mo (1991)
- Primitivo Ebok Ala: Kalabang Mortal ni Baby Ama (1991)
- Ano Ba Iyan? (1992) – Don Peping
- Estribo Gang: The Jinggoy Sese Story (1992) – Maj. Estrella
- Warden (1992) – Warden Pajaron
- Totoy Guwapo: Alyas Kanto Boy (1992) – Roldan
- Lumayo Ka Man sa Akin (1992) – Fernan
- Dudurugin Kita ng Bala Ko (1992)
- Canary Brothers of Tondo (1992) – Totoy Golem
- Bukas Tatakpan Ka ng Diyaryo (1992) – Don Roman
- Ang Siga at ang Sosyal (1992) – Don Luis Regalado / Manolo
- Amang Capulong - Anak ng Tondo II (1992)
- Ako ang Katarungan (Lt. Napoleon M. Guevarra) (1992)
- Beloy Montemayor Jr.: Tirador ng Cebu (1993) – Sergeant Dimalante
- Ikaw Lang (1993) – Sarge
- Leonardo Delos Reyes: Alyas Waway (1993) – Roger Taba
- Victor Meneses: Dugong Kriminal (1993)
- Padre Amante Guerrero (1993) – Rocco
- Mama's Boys (1993)
- Astig (1993) – Major Aliño
- Ano Ba 'Yan 2 (1993) – Don Peping
- Mancao (1993) – Atty. Andaya
- Ismael Zacarias (1994) – Maj. Roxas
- Comfort Women: A Cry for Justice (1994)
- Ka Hector (1994) – Delos Santos
- Walang Matigas Na Pulis sa Matinik Na Misis (1994)
- Tunay Na Magkaibigan, Walang Iwanan... Peksman (1994) – Julio
- Tigre ng Mindanao (1994)
- Nagkataon... Nagkatagpo (1994) – Hepe
- Lucas Abelardo (1994) – Fiscal
- Run Barbi Run (1995) – Gardo
- Pulis Probinsya II: Tapusin Na Natin ang Laban (1995) – Cong. Dimasupli
- The Grepor Butch Belgica Story (1995) – Leader
- Batangueno Kabitenyo (1995)
- Adan Lazaro (1996) – Gen. Roxas
- Tubusin Mo ng Bala ang Puso Ko (1996) – Edward
- Virgin People 2 (1996) – Tio Igna
- Utol (1996) – Ador
- Kung Marunong Kang Magdasal, Umpisahan Mo Na (1996) – Col. Mora
- Tolentino (1996)
- Makamandag Na Bango (1996) – Karding
- Totoy Hitman (1996) – Col. Mercado
- Boy Chico: Hulihin si Ben Tumbling (1997)
- Wala Ka Nang Puwang sa Mundo (1997) – Castro
- Tapatan ng Tapang (1997)
- Pusakal (1997) – Marko
- Pablik Enemi 1 n 2: Aksidental Heroes (1997) – Señor Santiago
- Lihim ni Madonna (1997)
- Iskalawag: Ang Batas Ay Batas (1997) – Toring
- Buhay Mo'y Buhay Ko Rin (1997)
- Bobby Barbers: Parak (1997) – Don Jose
- Biyudo si Daddy, Biyuda si Mommy (1997) – Bodji
- Virgin People
- Pagbabalik ng Probinsyano (1998) – Rodrigo
- Guevarra: Sa Batas Ko, Walang Hari (1998) – Col. Zamora
- Ben Delubyo (1998) – General
- Birador (1998) – Vergara
- May Sayad (1998) – Dr. Austria
- Jesus Salonga, Alyas Boy Indian (1998)
- Alyas Boy Tigas: Probinsyanong Wais (1998)
- Notoryus (1998)
- Ginto't Pilak (1998)
- Droga, Pagtatapat ng Mga Babaeng Addict (1999) – Don Peping
- Kanang Kamay: Ituro Mo, Itutumba Ko (1999) – Gene Zarate's henchman #2
- Tigasin (1999) – Mr. Khorami
- Hey Babe! (1999) – Jose
- Pepeng Agimat (1999) – Col. Dimayacyac
- Antonio Cuervo - Police: Walang Pinipili ang Batas (2000)
- Tunay na Tunay: Gets Mo? Gets Ko! (2000) – Mr. Li
- Col. Elmer Jamias: Barako ng Maynila (2000) – SPO2 Valdez
- Daddy O, Baby O! (2000) – Samson
- Kailangan Ko'y Ikaw (2000) – Tomas
- Booba (2001) – Gen. Lee
- Weyt a Minit, Kapeng Mainit (2001)
- Pagdating ng Panahon (2001) – Tatay Manolo
- Hari ng Selda: Anak ni Baby Ama 2 (2002) – Director Reyes
- Paraiso (2005)
- You Are the One (2006)
- Anak ng Kumander (2008) – Col. Aquino
- Ang Tanging Ina N'yong Lahat (2008) – Senator
- 666 (2010)
- Ang Babae sa Sementeryo (2010) – Ernesto
- Untamed Virgins (2011)
- Hostage Ko... Multo! (2011)
- Manila Kingpin: The Asiong Salonga Story (2011) – Hepe Villagonzalo
- Moron 5 and the Crying Lady (2012) – Father of Mozart
- My Naughty Kid: Huwag Kang Pasaway (2012) – Lolo
- Tiktik: The Aswang Chronicles (2012) – Capt. Rain Regalado
- El Presidente (2012)
- The Fighting Chefs (2013) – Atty. Cortes
- Raketeros (2013) – Berto's father
- Boy Golden: Shoot to Kill (2013) – Don Ricardo de Montiel
- Alibughang Anak (2014)
- DOTA: Nakakabaliw (2014)

=== Television ===
- Labs Ko Si Babe (1999)
- !Oka Tokat (2000)
- Panday (2005) - Emong
- Maria Flordeluna (2007) - Tibor Natividad
- Someone to Love (2009) - Mr. Gonzales
- Kahit Puso'y Masugatan (2012) - Major
- Aso ni San Roque (2012) - General
- Forever (2013) - Atty. Barabas
- Wagas (2013) - Warden Alimurong / Chesco's Father
- Paraiso Ko'y Ikaw (2014) - Francis Ilustre
- Rhodora X (2014) - Antonio Cruz (Last TV Appearance)

== Awards and nominations ==
Year	Award	Category	Work	Result
1970	FAMAS Awards	Best Supporting Actor	Nasaan ang Katarungan?	Nominated
1978	FAMAS Awards	Best Supporting Actor	Burlesk Queen	Nominated
