= Sukdulan =

Sukdulan may refer to:

- Sukdulan (1988 film), a Filipino erotic horror film
- Sukdulan (2003 film), a Filipino erotic drama film
