= Walang Matigas Na Pulis sa Matinik Na Misis =

1994 Filipino action comedy film

- Directed by: Danilo P. Cabreira
- Written by: Jojo M. Lapus; Nerdie Cruz
- Starring: Ramon "Bong" Revilla Jr.; Lani Mercado; Plinky Recto
- Cinematography: Danny Bustos
- Edited by: Pepe Marcos
- Music by: Nonong Buencamino
- Production companies: Mahogany Pictures; RRJ Films Production
- Distributed by: Moviestars Production
- Release date: 16 November 1994
- Running time: 95 minutes
- Country: Philippines
- Language: Filipino

Walang Matigas Na Pulis sa Matinik Na Misis (lit. 'There Is No Tough Policeman to a Fierce Wife') is a 1994 Philippine action comedy film directed by Danilo P. Cabreira. The film stars Ramon "Bong" Revilla Jr. as the titular policeman, his wife Lani Mercado as the titular misis and Plinky Recto.

A sequel, Yes Darling: Walang Matigas Na Pulis 2, was released in 1997, with Revilla and Mercado reprising their roles. A television remake of the same name began airing in 2023, with Revilla alone reprising his role.

The film is streaming online on YouTube.

== Cast ==
- Ramon "Bong" Revilla Jr. as Capt. Bartolome Reynaldo
- Lani Mercado as Gloria
- Plinky Recto as Mildred
- Jimmy Santos as Lt. Billy Rosales
- Tessie Tomas as Tiya Lucing
- Rod Navarro as Don Pedro
- King Gutierrez as Lt. Jack Godinez
- Roldan Aquino as Col. Tomas
- Edwin Reyes as Jamil
- Manjo del Mundo as Sgt. Olivar
- Joe Baltazar as Magno
- Brando Legaspi as Bartolome's Policeman
- Rey Obias as Bartolome's Policeman
- Tom Olivar as Bartolome's Policeman
- Boy Diaz as Bartolome's Policeman
- Vic Belaro as Bartolome's Policeman
- Noel Domdom as Bartolome's Policeman
- Arthur Santamaria as Bartolome's Policeman
- Francisco Uno as Bartolome's Policeman
- Johnny Ylagan as Bartolome's Policeman
- Eddie Miranda as Bartolome's Policeman
- Allan Medina as Bartolome's Policeman
- Mario Castro as Bartolome's Policeman
- Norman Herras as Bartolome's Policeman
- Michael Morales as Bartolome's Policeman
- Bong Ponce as Bartolome's Policeman
- Dennis Amarante as Bartolome's Policeman
- Danny Pajaron as Bartolome's Policeman
- Lito Balagbis as Bartolome's Policeman
- Jose Balagtas as Dept. Store Assassin
- Telly Babasa as Dept. Store Assassin
- Robert Miller as Dept. Store Assassin
- Blandino as Dept. Store Assassin

== Release ==
The film was released in November 16, 1994.

=== Critical response ===
Mario E. Bautista, writing for Movie Flash, gave the film a positive review, praising spouses Revilla and Mercado for fulfilling their characters' husband-and-wife dynamic well and calling the film "successful" in both its action and comic scenes.

== Future ==
=== Sequel ===
A sequel titled Yes Darling: Walang Matigas Na Pulis 2 was released in 1997.

=== Television remake ===
From June to August 2023, a television series remake of the same name aired on GMA Network, with Revilla reprising his role and Beauty Gonzalez taking over Mercado's role. A second season premiered in February 2024, while the third and final season premiered in December 2024 and ended in February 2025.
