= Magdaleno Orbos: Sa Kuko ng Mga Lawin =

1992 action film starring Eddie Garcia

- Official movie poster
- Directed by: Jose Balagtas
- Written by: Erwin T. Lanado
- Starring: Eddie Garcia; Eddie Gutierrez; Charlie Davao; Gabriel Romulo; Jessie Delgado; Star Querubin; Ilonah Jean; Sheila Ysrael
- Cinematography: Eduardo 'Baby' Cabrales
- Edited by: Toto Natividad
- Music by: Jimmy Fabregas
- Production company: Harvest International Films Corporation
- Distributed by: Harvest International Films Corporation
- Release dates: August 30, 1992 (SM Megamall); September 3, 1992
- Running time: 113 minutes
- Country: Philippines
- Language: Filipino
- Budget: ₱13 million

Magdaleno Orbos: Sa Kuko ng Mga Lawin (lit. 'In the Claw of Hawks') is a 1992 Filipino action film directed by Jose Balagtas. The film stars Eddie Garcia as the titular character, alongside Eddie Gutierrez, Charlie Davao, Star Querubin, Sheila Ysrael, Ilonah Jean, Nick Romano, Dick Israel, Gabriel Romulo, and Jessie Delgado. Produced by Harvest International Films Corporation, the film was released on September 3, 1992.

Critic Justino Dormiendo of the Manila Standard gave Magdaleno Orbos a negative review, criticizing the film's direction, acting, and routine plot.

== Plot ==
Magdaleno Orbos, a wealthy contractor in the construction industry, is honest and fair in doing his job. Fellow businessman Mr. Alingcastre resents this fact, and begins to harass Magdaleno and send him threats of violence. Because Magdaleno is unfazed by his threats, Alingcastre sends assassins to kill his workers instead. Eventually, Magdaleno's wife is killed by the men of Alingcastre, leading to Magdaleno becoming a vigilante.

== Cast ==
- Eddie Garcia as Magdaleno Orbos
- Eddie Gutierrez as Mr. Alingcastre
- Charlie Davao as Araneta
- Star Querubin
- Sheila Ysrael
- Ilonah Jean
- Nick Romano
- Dick Israel as Jake
- Gabriel Romulo
- Jessie Delgado
- Philip Gamboa
- Orestes Ojeda
- Renato del Prado
- Conrad Poe
- Tsing Tong Tsai
- Chanel Cuenca
- Jennifer Nubla
- Shana Torres
- Susan Tolentino
- Robin Shou
- Chun Hua Li (as Kingkong)
- Edgar Tejada
- Odette Khan
- Usman Hassim
- Bobby Benitez
- Eddie del Mar Jr.
- Rommel Valdez
- Danny Riel
- Robert Talby
- Robert Miller
- Alex David
- Joe Baltazar
- Bebeng Amora
- Vic Felipe
- Ros Olgado
- Naty Santiago

== Production ==
Shooting for Magdaleno Orbos lasted for nearly a year, and began before Eddie Garcia was even cast in the lead role. Hong Kong actors Robin Shou and Chun Hua Li, the latter credited as Kingkong, were also cast in the film.

It is actress and Manila councilor Star Querubin's final film before she retired from show business to focus on her education.

== Release ==
Magdaleno Orbos premiered at SM Megamall in Mandaluyong on August 30, 1992, before being released nationwide on September 3.

=== Critical response ===
Justino Dormiendo, writing for the Manila Standard, gave the film a negative review, criticizing the film's "tired plot" involving vigilantes, implausible scenarios, direction, and acting.
