= Virgin People =

1996 Philippine drama film

- Directed by: Celso Ad. Castillo
- Written by: Celso Ad. Castillo
- Screenplay by: Rolando Aquino (additional dialogue)
- Produced by: Amado Tan
- Starring: Sunshine Cruz; Sharmaine Suarez; Ana Capri
- Cinematography: Isagani F. Sioson
- Edited by: Edgardo "Boy" Vinarao
- Music by: Joey Ayala
- Production company: Four Aces Films
- Distributed by: Four Aces Films
- Release date: April 11, 1996
- Running time: 100 minutes
- Country: Philippines
- Language: Filipino

Virgin People (also known as Virgin People 2) is a 1996 Philippine erotic drama film written and directed by Celso Ad. Castillo. The film stars Sunshine Cruz, Sharmaine Suarez and Ana Capri, the latter in her theatrical debut, in the title roles. It is the sequel to and a remake of Castillo's 1984 film Virgin People.

A stand-alone sequel, Virgin People III, was released in 2003.

The film is streaming online on YouTube.

== Plot ==
Sisters Ikang (Sunshine), Aning (Sharmaine) and Talya (Ana) live in a hidden valley far from town with their father (Ronaldo) who prevents them from leaving their home for an unknown reason.

== Cast ==
- Sunshine Cruz as Ikang
- Sharmaine Suarez as Aning
- Anna Capri as Talia
- Tonton Gutierrez as Isaac
- Ronaldo Valdez as Ama
- Roldan Aquino as Tio Igna
