= Talahib at Rosas =

Philippine action film

- Directed by: Jose "Kaka" Balagtas
- Written by: Humilde "Meek" Roxas
- Produced by: William Leary
- Starring: Cesar Montano; Anjanette Abayari
- Cinematography: Ver Dauz
- Edited by: Renato de Leon
- Music by: Nonong Buencamino
- Production company: Viva Films
- Distributed by: Viva Films
- Release date: 26 October 1994
- Running time: 94 minutes
- Country: Philippines
- Language: Filipino

Talahib at Rosas (lit. Wild Grass and Roses) is a 1994 Philippine action film directed by Jose "Kaka" Balagtas. The film stars Cesar Montano and Anjanette Abayari.

A sequel, Talahib at Rosas 2, was released in 1999.

The film is streaming online on YouTube.

== Cast ==
- Cesar Montano as Jacod Villapando
- Anjanette Abayari as Abba Jalandoni
- Dante Rivero as Col. Conde
- Bembol Roco as Kumander Baleleng
- Albert Martinez as Mayor Jake Jalandoni
- Ramon Christopher as Jamil
- Boy Roque as Jamil's Aide
- Renato del Prado as Police Chief
- Rex Lapid as Ablan
- Danny Rifi as Police Sgt.
- Telly Babasa as Motorcycle Group Leader
- Dexter Doria as Abba's Mother
- Bert Martinez as Abba's Father
- Edwin Reyes as Lt. Robledo
- Clemente Soriano Jr. as Tata Kanor
- Jose "Kaka" Balagtas as Reporter
- Johnny Ramirez as Japanese Kidnap Victim
- Erning Mariano as Warden
- Eddie Fajardo as Prison Guard
- Sabrina M. as Mayor's Secretary
