= Kahit Buhay Ko =

1992 action film by Jose N. Carreon

- Directed by: Jose N. Carreon
- Screenplay by: Jose N. Carreon; Jojo Lapus
- Produced by: Victoria Lorna Fernandez
- Starring: Rudy Fernandez; Ruffa Gutierrez
- Cinematography: Ricardo Remias
- Edited by: Edgardo Vinarao
- Music by: Jaime Fabregas
- Production company: Reflection Films
- Distributed by: Reflection Films
- Release date: May 27, 1992
- Running time: 100 minutes
- Country: Philippines
- Language: Filipino

Kahit Buhay Ko (lit. Even My Life) is a 1992 Philippine action film co-written and directed by Jose N. Carreon. The film stars Rudy Fernandez and Ruffa Gutierrez.

== Plot ==
Marco (Rudy) is jailed for killing Ben Bato (King) while saving his brother Melgar (Tirso). After being released from prison, he finds out that his fiance Ofelia (Ruffa) is long married to Melgar. Marco finds a job as a club bouncer, while Melgar joins Dinero's (Johnny) syndicate.

== Cast ==
- Rudy Fernandez as Marco
- Ruffa Gutierrez as Ofelia
- Tirso Cruz III as Melgar
- Johnny Delgado as Dinero
- Michael de Mesa as Lt. Torres
- Roi Vinzon as Tunying
- Rina Reyes as Adela
- Anita Linda as Aling Leticia
- Rez Cortez as Lando
- Zandro Zamora as Kardo
- Danny Sy as Oklay
- Alma Lerma as Ofelia's Aunt
- Edmund Cupcupin as Tata Pacio
- Rudy Meyer as Prisoner
- King Gutierrez as Ben Bato

== Reception ==
Justino Dormiendo of the Manila Standard gave Kahit Buhay Ko a positive review. He praised the competent performances of the main and supporting stars. He also praised director Jose Carreon for "making his film rise above the norm" of typical action films.

== Awards ==
| Year | Awards | Category | Recipient | Result | Ref. |
|---|---|---|---|---|---|
| 1993 | 42nd FAMAS Awards | Best Supporting Actor | Tirso Cruz III | Nominated | |
| 1993 | 9th FAP Awards | Best Supporting Actor | Tirso Cruz III | Won | |
| 1993 | 17th Gawad Urian Award | Best Supporting Actor | Tirso Cruz III | Won | |
| 1993 | 17th Gawad Urian Award | Best Screenplay | Jose N. Carreon; Jojo Lapus | Nominated | |
