= Walang Matigas na Pulis sa Matinik na Misis (TV series) =

Philippine television drama series

- Season 3 title card
- Genre: Police procedural; Comedy drama
- Based on: Walang Matigas Na Pulis sa Matinik Na Misis (1994) by Danilo Cabreira
- Written by: Reggie Amigo; Liberty Trinidad; Jake Somera; Loi Argel Nova
- Directed by: Enzo Williams; Frasco Mortiz
- Creative director: Aloy Adlawan
- Starring: Bong Revilla; Beauty Gonzalez
- Opening theme: "Walang Matigas na Pulis sa Matinik na Misis" by RK Kent
- Country of origin: Philippines
- Original language: Tagalog
- No. of seasons: 3
- No. of episodes: 33

Production
- Executive producer: Lenie Gonzales-Santos
- Production location: Metro Manila
- Cinematography: Elmer Haresco Despa; Abijah Bautista
- Editors: Robert Ryan Reyes; Eddie Esmedia; Vincent Valenzuela; Benedict Lavastida
- Camera setup: Multiple-camera setup
- Running time: 31–40 minutes
- Production company: GMA Entertainment Group

Original release
- Network: GMA Network
- Release: June 4, 2023 – February 2, 2025

Walang Matigas na Pulis sa Matinik na Misis (transl. there's no tough police to a strong wife) is a Philippine television police procedural comedy drama series broadcast by GMA Network. The series is based on the 1994 film of the same title. Directed by Enzo Williams and Frasco Mortiz, it stars Bong Revilla and Beauty Gonzalez. It premiered on June 4, 2023 on the network's Sunday Grande sa Gabi line up. The series concluded on February 2, 2025, with a total of three seasons and 33 episodes.

The series is streaming online on YouTube.

== Premise ==
Bartolome Reynaldo is a police major who is recognized for being devoted to finding criminals. He is known for not fearing anyone except Gloria, his wife.

== Cast and characters ==
Cast

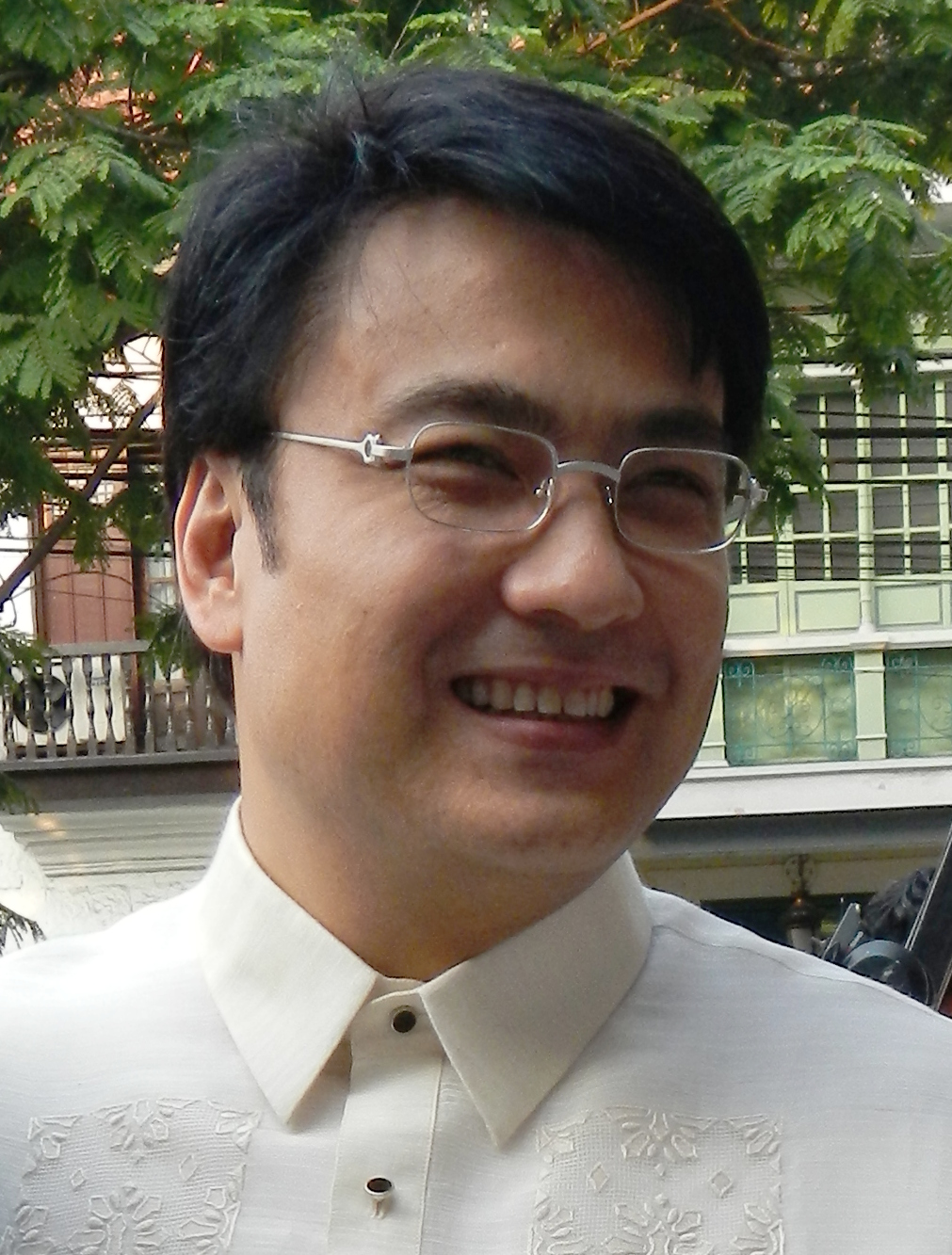
Bong Revilla

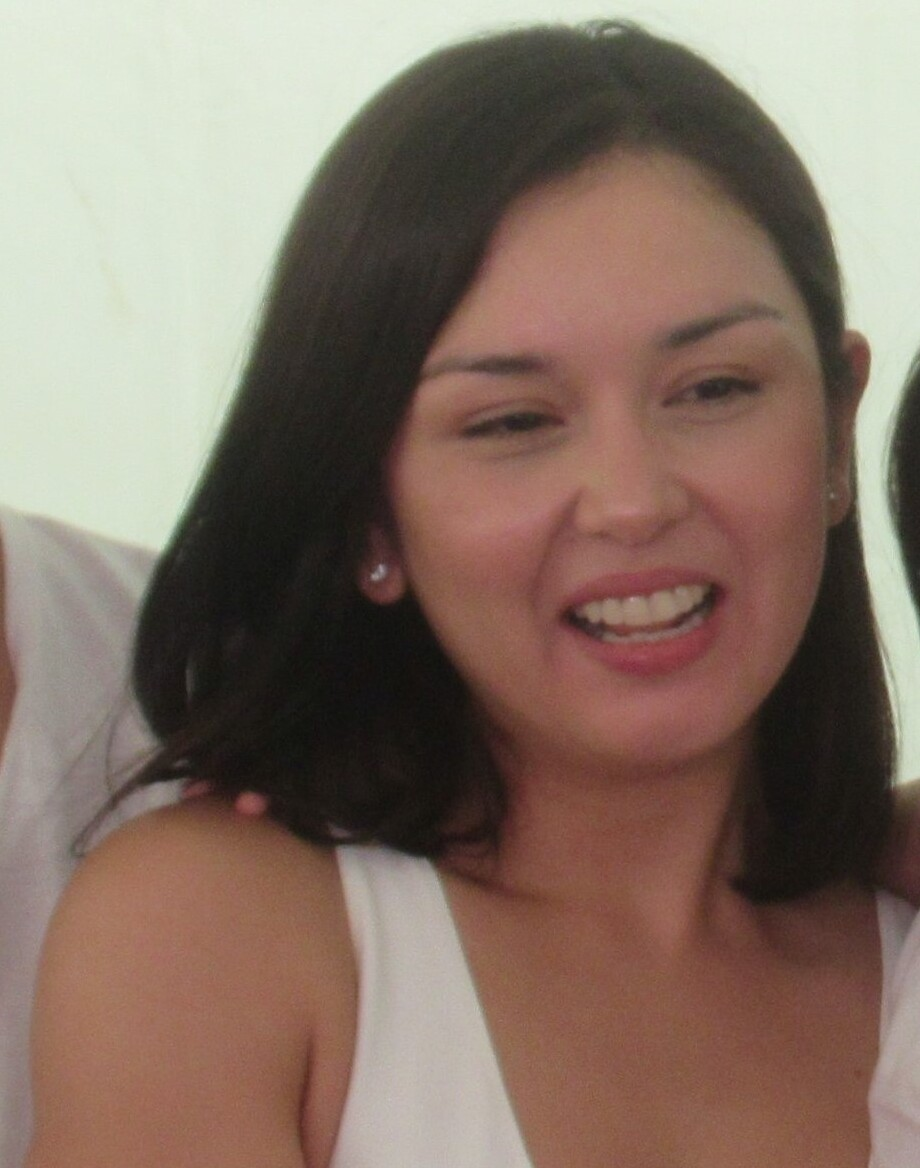
Beauty Gonzalez

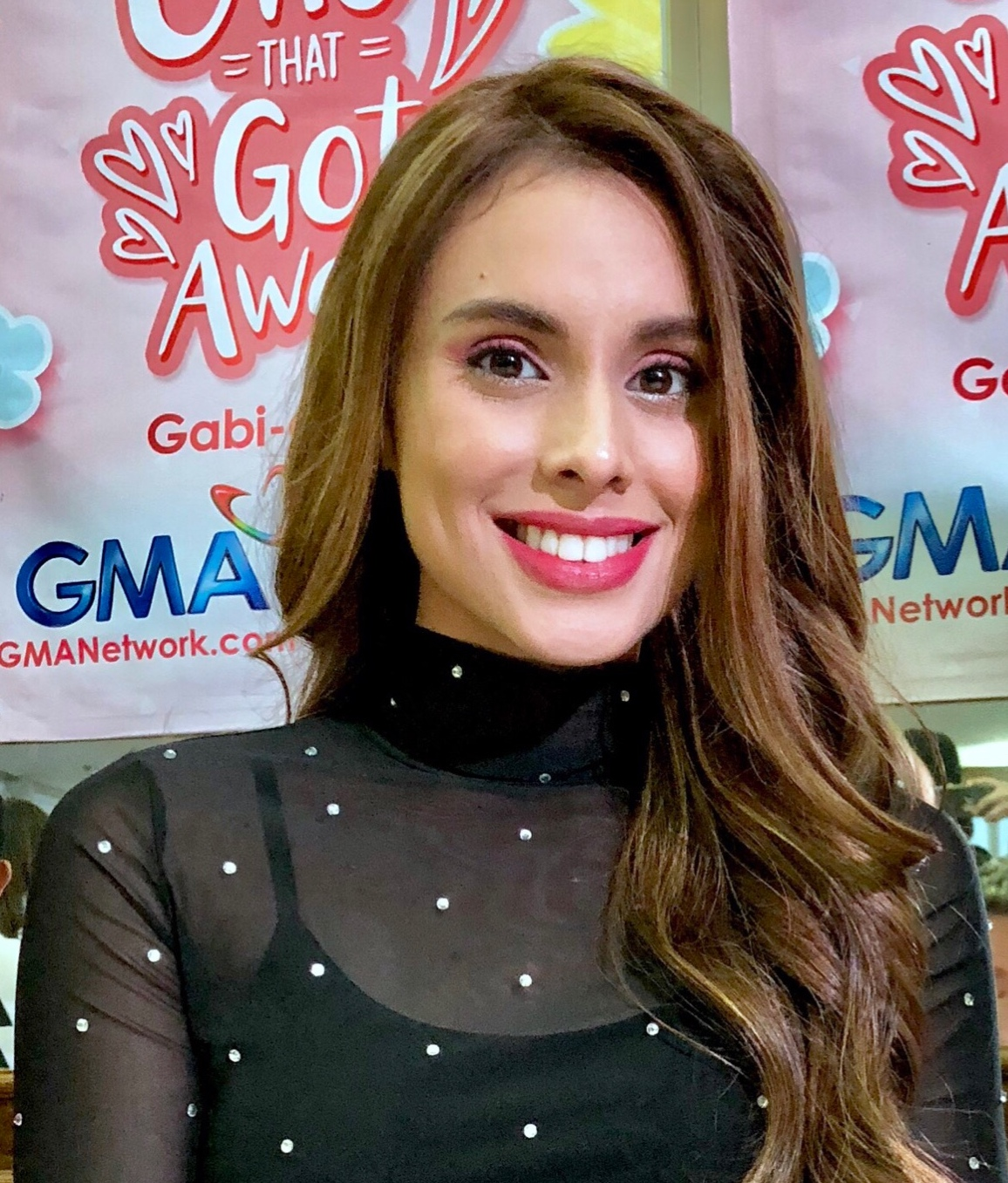
Max Collins

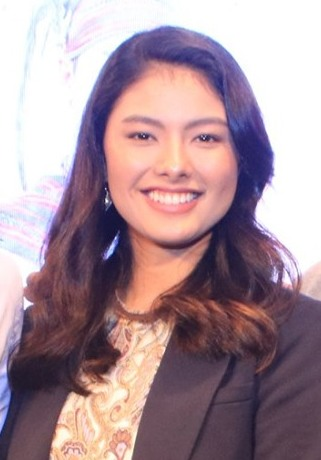
Kate Valdez

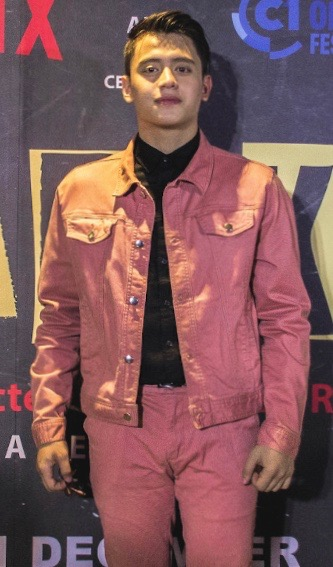
Kelvin Miranda

Lead cast

- Bong Revilla as Bartolome "Bart/Tolome" Reynaldo
- Beauty Gonzalez as Gloria Hernando-Reynaldo

Supporting cast

- Max Collins as Elizabeth "Elize / Puso" Riego-De Dios
- Kate Valdez as Sheena Riego De Dios (season 1)
- Kelvin Miranda as Gary Hernando
- Carmi Martin as Lucita "Lucing" Dallego
- Niño Muhlach as Sylvestre "Style" Salonga
- Dennis Padilla as Vincent Policarpio
- Maey Bautista as Candida Magtulis
- Raphael Landicho as Francisco "Kiko" Reynaldo
- Nikki Co as Dustin Tibayan
- Angel Leighton as Pretty Competente
- E. R. Ejercito as Juancho "Kamao" Dehado
- Bembol Roco as Ulo (season 1)
- Dennis Marasigan as Lorenzo delos Reyes (season 1)
- Jestoni Alarcon as Gener Alberto (season 2–3)
- Ejay Falcon as Ace Catacutan (season 2)
- Liezel Lopez as Jacqueline "Jacq" Dela Torre (season 2–3)
- Jeffrey Tam as Onofre "Bunso" Batumbakal (season 2–3)
- Herlene Budol as Mia Salonga (season 2)
- Dion Ignacio as Blake Montecillo (season 2)
- Lianne Valentin as Loretta Montecillo (season 2)
- Celeste Cortesi as Diana "Diamond Ricci" Mondejar (season 2)
- Mika Salamanca as Megan Espinosa (season 2)
- Roi Vinzon as Vito Poblete (season 2)
- Michael de Mesa as Luther Abueva (season 2)
- Sanya Lopez as Mildred Darlene Yabut (season 2)
- Leo Martinez as Adonis Reynaldo (season 3)
- Jillian Ward as Barbara (season 3)
- Faith da Silva as Jinky (season 3)
- Gloria Diaz as Nadia Hernando (season 3)
- Joko Diaz as Diego (season 3)
- Sid Lucero as Joseph "Jepoy" Roberto (season 3)
- Ryan Eigenmann as Rico (season 3)

Guest cast

- Jeric Raval as Dodong "Buto" Butak
- Geneva Cruz as Iris "Virus" Dehado
- Manolo Pedrosa as Nikko "Bituka" Carpio
- Diego Llorico as a barangay tanod
- Vince Crisostomo as Dimaano
- Seb Pajarillo as Peralta
- Kiel Rodriguez as Ed
- Stanley Abuloc as Noel
- Michael Roy Jornales as Mata
- Sophia Senoron as Jessica
- Bernard Palanca as "Balat" Trinidad
- Jimmy Santos as Billy Boy Rosales
- Ian Ignacio as JC
- Dinky Doo Jr. as Ryan
- Thou Reyes as Chester "Mukha" Campos
- Al Tantay as Marcus Galang
- Michael V. as Hugo "Utak" Salazar
- Ronald dela Rosa as Batome
- Lani Mercado as Batome's wife
- Jay Manalo as Pancho Blanco
- Ramon Christopher as Redentor Pigsart
- Antonio Aquitania as Rafael "Paeng" Advincula
- Brent Valdez as Alfred
- MJ Ordillano as Harry
- Sherry Lara as Biring Batumbakal
- Roger Kent Ostia
- John Feir as a scammer
- Leandro Baldemor as Ariel
- Tart Carlos as Tere
- Atak Araña as Venus Arevalo
- Christian Vasquez as Estong
- Marnie Lapuz as Sandra del Mundo
- Johnny Revilla as Ninong
- Giovanni Baldisseri as Commissioner Pascual
- Renzo Cruz as Lawrence Montecillo
- Antonio Vinzon as Arkel Poblete

== Seasons ==
Season	Episodes	Originally released	
Season	Episodes	First released	Last released
1	12	June 4, 2023	August 20, 2023
2	14	February 4, 2024	May 5, 2024
3	7	December 22, 2024	February 2, 2025

== Production ==
Principal photography for the first season commenced on May 1, 2023. Filming for the second season concluded on March 14, 2024.

== Ratings ==
According to AGB Nielsen Philippines' Nationwide Urban Television Audience Measurement People in television homes, the pilot episode of Walang Matigas na Pulis sa Matinik na Misis earned a 12.3% rating. The season 1 finale scored a 10% rating. The season 2 finale episode earned 9.2% rating. The season 3 premiere garnered a 10.6% rating. The series finale achieved scored a 9.5% rating.

== Accolades ==
Accolades received by Walang Matigas na Pulis sa Matinik na Misis
Year	Award	Category	Recipient	Result	Ref.
2024	52nd Box Office Entertainment Awards	Comedy Actor of the Year	Bong Revilla	Won	
2024	52nd Box Office Entertainment Awards	Comedy Actress of the Year	Beauty Gonzalez	Won	
2025	38th PMPC Star Awards for Television	Best Mini Series	Walang Matigas na Pulis sa Matinik na Misis	Won	
2025	37th PMPC Star Awards for Television	Best Mini Series	Walang Matigas na Pulis sa Matinik na Misis	Won	
