= Jose Balagtas =

Filipino film director

Jose "Kaka" Balagtas is a film director, writer, actor, producer and politician in the Philippines. He previously served as Vice Mayor of San Antonio, Nueva Ecija.

Balagtas is the director of films such as Patron (1988) with Dante Varona, Tupang Itim (1989) with Jess Lapid, Jr., David Balondo ng Tondo (1990) with Ramon Revilla, Magdaleno Orbos: Sa Kuko ng Mga Lawin (1991) with Eddie Garcia, Pat. Omar Abdullah: Pulis Probinsiya (1992) with Phillip Salvador, and Talahib at Rosas (1994) with Cesar Montano.

In 1994, Balagtas won the Best Director Award in the Metro Manila Film Festival for the film Lucas Abelardo starring Roi Vinzon.

He also directed the films Walang Iba Kundi Ikaw (2002) with Mikey Arroyo, Apoy sa Dibdib ng Samar (2006) with Mark Lapid, and Anak ng Kumander (2008) with Manny Pacquiao.

Balagtas produced the films Terrorist Hunter (2005) and Anak ng Kumander (2008).

== Filmography ==
Year	Title	Director	Writer	Notes
1986	Alindog	Yes	Yes	
1987	Selos	Yes	Yes	
1988	Sukdulan	Yes	Yes	
1988	Patron	Yes	No	
1989	Handa Na ang Hukay Mo, Calida	Yes	No	
1989	Punglo... Bawat Hakbang	Yes	Yes	
1989	Tupang Itim	Yes	Yes	
1990	David Balondo ng Tondo	Yes	Yes	
1990	Bato, Lupa, Putik	Yes	Yes	
1990	Sisingilin Ko ng Dugo	Yes	Yes	
1992	Pat. Omar Abdullah: Pulis Probinsiya	Yes	Story	
1992	Magdaleno Orbos: Sa Kuko ng Mga Lawin	Yes	No	
1993	Pita	Yes	No	
1994	Oplan: Mindanao	Yes	Yes	
1994	Nandito Ako	Yes	No	
1994	Baby Paterno (Dugong Pulis)	Yes	Yes	
1994	Talahib at Rosas	Yes	No	
1994	Lucas Abelardo	Yes	Story	
1995	Kapitan Tumba	Yes	No	
1995	Urban Rangers	Yes	No	
1996	Masamang Damo	Yes	No	
1996	Makamandag Na Bango	Yes	Yes	
1996	Bala Ko sa Huling Tapang Mo	Yes	No	
1997	Duplikado	Yes	Yes	
1997	Boy Chico: Hulihin... Ben Tumbling	Yes	Yes	
1997	Habang Nasasaktan Lalong Tumatapang	Yes	No	
1997	Bubot	Yes	Story	
1998	Squala	Yes	No	
1998	Babangon ang Huling Patak ng Dugo	Yes	No	
2000	Sugo ng Tondo	Yes	Yes	
2001	Kapirasong Gubat sa Gitna ng Dagat	Yes	No	
2001	Mahal Kita... Kahit Sino Ka Pa!	Yes	Yes	
2001	Basagan ng Mukha	Yes	No	
2002	Walang Iba Kundi Ikaw	Yes	Yes	
2006	Apoy sa Dibdib ng Samar	Yes	No	
2008	Anak ng Kumander	Yes	Story	"Story by" credit
2021	Takas (Death Wish)	Yes	No	Short film
TBA	Malvar: Tuloy ang Laban	Yes	No	

=== As writer and/or producer only ===
Year	Title	Writer	Producer
1983	Hulihin ang Mandurugas	Yes	No
1986	Desperada	Yes	No
1996	Isa Lang ang Dapat Mahalin	Yes	No
1996	Pusong Hiram	Yes	Yes
2005	Terrorist Hunter	No	Supervising

=== Acting roles ===
Year	Title	Role	Note(s)	Ref(s).
1979	Hold Up (Special Squad)			
1979	Durugin si Totoy Bato			
1981	Commander Lawin			
1982	Nang Umibig ang Mga Gurang			
1983	Pieta			
1985	Anak ng Tondo			
1986	Gisingin Natin ang Gabi			
1986	Okleng Tokleng			
1989	Killer vs. Ninjas			
1992	Pat. Omar Abdullah: Pulis Probinsiya			
1993	Tatak ng Kriminal			
1993	Mancao			
1994	Talahib at Rosas	Reporter		
1994	Walang Matigas Na Pulis sa Matinik Na Misis	Assassin at dept. store		
1994	Lucas Abelardo	State witness		
1996	Ober da Bakod 2 (Da Treasure Adbentyur)	Bank holdupper head		
1996	Hangga't May Hininga	Labor leader		
1996	Isa Lang ang Dapat Mahalin	Joe		
2000	Matalino Man ang Matsing Naiisahan Din!			
2003	A.B. Normal College: Todo Na 'Yan! Kulang Pa 'Yun!	Drug lord		
2006	Apoy sa Dibdib ng Samar	Environmental police		
2006	Batas Militar	Mang Tasyo		
2008	Anak ng Kumander	Captain Hadjie		

- FPJ's Ang Probinsyano (Kapamilya Channel and TV5) (2021)
