= Lucas Abelardo =

Philippine action film

- Directed by: Jose "Kaka" Balagtas
- Story by: Jose "Kaka" Balagtas
- Based on: Mystery Murder Komiks
- Produced by: Jose D. Ignacio
- Starring: Roi Vinzon
- Cinematography: Ver Dauz
- Edited by: Renato de Leon
- Music by: Rey Magtoto
- Production company: Levin Films
- Distributed by: Levin Films
- Release date: December 25, 1994
- Running time: 102 minutes
- Country: Philippines
- Languages: Filipino; English

Lucas Abelardo is a 1994 Philippine action film written and directed by Jose "Kaka" Balagtas. The film stars Roi Vinzon in the title role. It was one of the entries in the 1994 Metro Manila Film Festival, where it won six awards, including Best Actor and Best Story.

== Cast ==
- Roi Vinzon as Lucas Abelardo
- Karen Timbol as Cenda
- Bembol Roco as Mayor
- Dante Rivero as Chief Lazaro
- Bob Soler as Governor
- Teresa Loyzaga as Lucas's Wife
- Karen Salas as Maria
- King Gutierrez as Colonel Banal
- Dencio Padilla as Inocencio
- Zandro Zamora as Baldo
- Conrad Poe as Hitman
- Roldan Aquino as Fiscal
- Levi Ignacio as Lucas' Policeman
- Dexter Doria as Governor's Wife
- Adonis Balagtas as Governor's Son
- Joniel Balagtas as Lucas' Son
- Danny Labra as Lucas' Policeman
- Polly Cadsawan as Lucas' Policeman
- Eddie Tuazon as Lucas' Policeman
- Vanni Ignacio as Lucas' Policeman
- Renato Del Prado as Chief's Henchman
- Bernard Atienza as Chief's Henchman
- Mon Fernandez as Chief's Henchman
- Naess Verano as Chief's Henchman
- Ray Ventura as Judge
- Tony Angeles as Lucas Lawyer
- Frank Young as Poldo
- Alex Toledo as Capt. Tiaga
- Jose "Kaka" Balagtas as State Witness

== Awards ==
Year	Awards	Category	Recipient	Result	Ref.
1994	20th Metro Manila Film Festival	Best Actor	Roi Vinzon	Won	
1994	20th Metro Manila Film Festival	Best Supporting Actress	Teresa Loyzaga	Won	
1994	20th Metro Manila Film Festival	Best Story	Jose "Kaka" Balagtas	Won	
1994	20th Metro Manila Film Festival	Best Original Song	Rey Magtoto	Won	
1994	20th Metro Manila Film Festival	Best Editing	Renato de Leon	Won	
1994	20th Metro Manila Film Festival	Best Sound Engineering	Rolly Ruta	Won	
1995	43rd FAMAS Awards	Best Actor	Roi Vinzon	Nominated	
