= Hindi Sisiw ang Kalaban Mo =

Philippine action film

- Directed by: Roland Ledesma
- Screenplay by: Senen Dimaguila
- Story by: Roland Ledesma
- Produced by: Roland Ledesma
- Starring: Ronald Gan Ledesma; Roi Vinzon; Zoren Legaspi
- Cinematography: Apolinario Cuenco
- Edited by: Nap Montebon
- Music by: Ed Barcena
- Production company: Sunlight Films
- Distributed by: Sunlight Films
- Release date: January 31, 2001
- Running time: 105 minutes
- Country: Philippines
- Language: Filipino

Hindi Sisiw ang Kalaban Mo is a 2001 Philippine action film written, produced and directed by Roland Ledesma. The film stars Ronald Gan Ledesma, Roi Vinzon and Zoren Legaspi.

== Cast ==
- Ronald Gan Ledesma as Rico Bernales
- Roi Vinzon as Capt. Aragon
- Zoren Legaspi as Capt. Tinio
- Rita Magdalena as May
- Ervin Mateo as Lt. Roman
- Bob Soler as Gen. Valdez
- Romy Diaz as Col. Altares
- Brando Legaspi as Marlon
- Conrad Poe as Gunner
- Johnny Vicar as Gunner
- Roy Beltran as Exec. Secretary
- Ramona Revilla as Jessica
- Jing Elizalde as Benjo
- Ben Sagmit as Tibo
- Ernie Zarate as Mr. Joson
- Daria Ramirez as Mrs. Joson
- Hanna Villame as Han
- Yoyoy Villame as Yoy
- Yam Ledesma as Yam
- Patrick Ervie Mateo as Billy
- Rhey Roldan as Anton
- Boy Alano as Egay
- Danny Labra as Dennis
- Michael Vera-Perez as Bobby
- Joker as Joe
- Thea Perez as Thea
- Tian Tian Perez as Tian Tian
- Joan Aguas as Joan
- Jun Yulo as Jun
- Bobby Dominguez as Bobby
- Monica as Cheence
- Tony Azucena as Tony

== Production ==
The film was supposed to be part of the 2000 Metro Manila Film Festival, but was not able to make it to the cut-off. Its playdate was set to late January 2001.
