= Batas ng Lansangan =

2002 action film by Ronwaldo Reyes

- Directed by: Ronwaldo Reyes
- Screenplay by: Manny R. Buising
- Story by: Pablo S. Gomez
- Produced by: Eric Cuatico
- Starring: Fernando Poe Jr.; Dina Bonnevie; Roi Vinzon
- Cinematography: Sergio Lobo
- Edited by: Augusto Salvador
- Music by: Jaime Fabregas
- Production companies: Maverick Films; FPJ Productions
- Distributed by: Maverick Films
- Release date: February 27, 2002
- Running time: 102 minutes
- Country: Philippines
- Language: Filipino

Batas ng Lansangan (transl. Law of the Street) is a 2002 Philippine action film directed by Fernando Poe Jr. under the moniker Ronwaldo Reyes. The film stars Poe in the title role, Dina Bonnevie and Roi Vinzon.

== Plot ==
In rural Northern Luzon, a local gang conducts a massive jailbreak; ex-cop and Philippine Army Major Ruben Medrano leads his elite anti-kidnapping force to round up the escapees, but in the process, shoots some civilians mocking him. Medrano is called back to his hometown of Manila and suspended from the army.

Medrano, still with service pistol, takes up residence with his older brother Ramon, who informs him that the neighborhood police captain who replaced Ruben has been allowing heroin addiction to spike. Ramon suspects the captain leads a crime syndicate with the barangay captain Lucero, who runs the local slaughterhouse complex, as well as Montenegro, an elderly steel plant owner who shot and killed Ruben's wife Alicia years ago (after Ruben had refused to punish his business rivals), and Montenegro's employee Carlos, a stoic hitman.

Ruben meets with his younger brother, Father Roland, and ex-sister-in-law Mariel, who is raising Ruben and Alicia's estranged teenage daughter Marissa. His efforts to bond with them lead to mixed results, though Mariel remembers anew that she was in love with Ruben before he married Alicia.

Ruben and Ramon set off to confront Lucero, having an awkward but friendly meeting with the police captain in the meantime. Ruben defeats Lucero in a fistfight beside the slaughterhouse, then warns him to stay out of his way before leaving. After a few hours, Ramon's wife Ester takes Ruben to Lucero's house. Ruben vaguely offers to let Lucero cooperate with him.

Ruben infiltrates Lucero's heroin den, where he shoots and kills much of the crime syndicate's personnel. He finds a scared street urchin named Jaq and takes her to Roland's church for basic treatment, where they find she is the victim of physical abuse. Ruben finds the abuser at a family funeral and beats him up, knocking over the casket.

The next day at an orphanage, Ruben and Jaq discuss their feelings. Marissa passes by, overhearing him reveal his fear of being unable to connect with her. While lunching at a restaurant, he gets in a brief gunfight with four of the syndicate members, defeating them. That evening, he meets with his old friend Dodong. Mariel asks Ruben to come outside, and they reveal their love for each other and kiss. Later at a bar, he beats the villainous bartender in another gunfight.

The next night, Ruben and Ramon stake out the orphanage. A group of masked gunmen attack the dormitory, killing Ramon. Ruben spends the next few days comforting his family. After Ramon's funeral, however, with Roland in his office and Ruben and Dodong investigating Montenegro's hideout at the plant, the gunmen ambush and kidnap the rest of the Medrano family from Mariel's house. Ruben and Dodong spot them.

Montenegro allows Mariel to make a brief call to Roland, and learns of Ruben's whereabouts. An armed Ruben and Dodong rush to the office building where Mariel and Marissa are kept, massacring many of the criminals along the way. Carlos hunts for Ruben, and they disarm each other before brawling. Ruben finds his pistol first, killing Carlos. When Montenegro finds a greatly wounded Ruben, Mariel emerges from behind a corner and shoots Montenegro dead. The family reconciles, and visits Roland at his church.

== Cast ==
- Fernando Poe Jr. as Maj. Ruben Medrano
- Dina Bonnevie as Mariel
- Roi Vinzon as Carlos
- Robert Arevalo as Ramon
- Ricardo Cepeda as Fr. Roland
- Kaye Abad as Marissa
  - Angelica Reyes as Young Marissa
- Paquito Diaz as Chairman Lucero
- Dick Israel as Dodong
- Charlie Davao as Montenegro
- Lorena Garcia as Jaq
- Jessette Prospero as Ester
- Maita Sanchez as Alicia
- Toby Alejar as Hector
- Tony Bernal as Bert
- Josie Galvez as Manang
- Jimmy Reyes as Alex Pusher
- Remy Javier as Aling Remy
- Bong Francisco as Convict
- Ernie Zarate as Convict's Father
- Leo Gamboa as Nonoy Kalbo
- Robert Miller as Nonoy's Hitman
- Olive Madridejos as Lucero's Wife
- Wilson Go as Businessman
- Bon Vibar as Priest
- Avel Morado as Slaughterhouse Foreman
- Joy Tan as Bar Floor Manager
