= Sukdulan (1988 film) =

1988 Filipino erotic horror film

- Directed by: Joe "Kaka" Balagtas
- Written by: Joe "Kaka" Balagtas
- Starring: Myra Manibog; Olga Miranda; Franco Madrigal
- Production company: Double M Productions
- Release date: 1988
- Country: Philippines
- Language: Filipino

Sukdulan (lit. 'Extremity') is a 1988 Filipino erotic horror film written and directed by Joe "Kaka" Balagtas and starring Myra Manibog, Olga Miranda, and Franco Madrigal. Produced by Double M Productions, it was released in mid-1988. Critic Lav Diaz gave a negative review of the film, criticizing most of the film for being cliched, forced, irritating, and annoying, while praising the suspenseful and frightening scenes involving the returned psychopathic expatriate from Saudi Arabia toward the end.

== Plot ==
A woman (Manibog) marries an Overseas Filipino Worker (OFW) in Saudi Arabia after her boyfriend leaves her. However, while her husband is away, she begins having a relationship with another man. She invites her friend (Miranda) to get together at a beach with their boyfriends, until she realizes her friend's boyfriend is her own former lover. Tensions and conflicts between the four ensue, all while the OFW plots his revenge on his wife after finding out about her affair from their naïve driver.

== Cast ==
- Myra Manibog
- Olga Miranda
- Franco Madrigal

== Release ==
Sukdulan was graded "C" by the Movie and Television Review and Classification Board (MTRCB), indicating a "fair" quality, and was released in mid-1988.

=== Critical response ===
Lav Diaz, writing for the Manila Standard, gave Sukdulan a negative review, criticizing it as leaning excessively into Freudian psychology in how the characters are motivated simply by sexual desire and nothing else. He stated that the only memorable part of the film besides the nude scenes are the killing scenes involving the returned psychopathic OFW from Saudi Arabia toward the end, which he considered fitfully frightening and suspenseful, while the rest of the film is "gasgas" (cliched), forced, irritating and annoying.
