= Jojo Lapus =

Filipino columnist and screenwriter (1943-2006)

- Born: Canuto M. Lapus; July 5, 1945; Iloilo, Philippines
- Died: September 20, 2006 (aged 63); Manila, Philippines
- Occupations: Screenwriter; columnist
- Years active: 1970–1999
- Spouse: Sally S. Lapus
- Children: 2, including John Lapus

Canuto "Jojo" M. Lapus (April 12, 1943 – September 20, 2006), was a Filipino showbiz columnist and screenwriter. He was known for directing Pepeng Shotgun (1981), Kahit Buhay Ko... (1992), and Leonardo Delos Reyes: Alyas Waway. He was the father of John Lapus.
