= Palito =

Filipino actor and comedian (1933–2010)

- Palito in 2009
- Born: Reynaldo Alfredo Hipolito; 4 September 1933; Calamba, Laguna, Philippine Islands
- Died: 12 April 2010 (aged 76); Manila, Philippines
- Resting place: National Shrine and Parish of San Antonio de Padua Columbary, Pila, Laguna
- Other names: Naldo, Palito
- Occupation: Actor/comedian
- Years active: 1960–2007
- Spouse: Remedios Zapanta-Hipolito
- Children: 4

Reynaldo Alfredo Hipolito (4 September 1933 – 12 April 2010) was a veteran Filipino slapstick comedian and actor who was at the height of his career in the 1970s and '80s. He was well known for his unusually light build and thin anatomy, earning him the self-deprecating screen name "Palito", which is Spanish for stick and is glossed in Filipino as matchstick or toothpick.

== Biography ==
Palito was born in Calamba, Laguna, near the house of Dr. José Rizal (known as the Rizal Shrine). As a teenager in the 1950s, he took a job as a dishwasher in a restaurant called Alex Soda Fountain, located beside the Cine Odeon along Calle Azcarraga (now C.M. Recto Avenue). The restaurant was frequented by movie stars, and he was discovered by Lauro Santiago of Santiago Productions.

He was only 21 when he first discovered the world of stage acting. A student of Arellano University, he decided to choose acting over his studies around 1959. Palito started as an "extra" in the 1960 Prinsipe Amante movie, starring the then superstar Rogelio dela Rosa. One of his early movies was Pitong Zapata in 1965. His first non-extra role was that as a sidekick of Jun Aristorenas in the late 60s film Bingbong at Dodong. At first, he was cast in straight action films. But because of his thinness, he was groomed as a comedian. He would be seen regularly working with actors Fernando Poe Jr., Dolphy, Chiquito, Niño Muhlach, the comedy trio Tito, Vic and Joey.

In the late 1970s, the decline of Philippine films and emergence of "Bomba" films hurt Palito's career. The action and comedy films which Palito made were not being made as they used to. Those were the times when Palito lost many of his investments.

In the 1980s, Palito played in Johnny Rambo Tango (1985), Rambuto (1986), No Blood, No Surrender (1985), James Bone, Agent 001, and Kumander Kalansalay (1988).

He would also been known as a star in a lot of kitsch Pinoy horror films as a zombie/corpse, due to his sunken eyes and thin body.

Palito laid low from Philippine cinema in the '90s, only occasionally playing bit parts, like in the 1992 film by contemporary comedian/actor Dolphy, Home Along the River, a send-up of the popular American Home Alone franchise. In 1993, he acted in Walang Matigas na Buto sa Gutom na Aso.

On June 17, 2004, burgeoning comedy actor Vhong Navarro portrayed Palito in the anthology drama series Maalaala Mo Kaya, focusing on his life story as a survivor of the Japanese occupation during World War II and his heyday as a slapstick comedian during the 1970s and 1980s.

Palito starred in an independent film, Enterpool: Senior Citizen in Action, released 24 August 2005, in the midst of the decline of Philippine cinema. While it was received well by nostalgic movie-goers and local movie critics, it failed to take the general public's notice due to lack of promotion and marketing. His last film was Ang M.O.N.A.Y. ni Mr. Shooli in 2007.

Palito's family, the Hipolitos, sold their house in Pacita Complex in San Pedro, Laguna in 2004 and moved to Imus, Cavite for a smaller place in a low-cost housing subdivision in Cavite.

Once voted as one of the top ten Filipino comedians of all-time, Palito engaged in small stage shows to make a living in his last years. He had a low-paying job performing a live music show Tuesday evenings in a small casino in Santa Cruz, Manila.

== Political views ==
In 1986, Palito campaigned for the reelection of president Ferdinand Marcos in the 1986 snap election.

== Illness and death ==
In the first quarter of 2010, Palito, a known smoker, was confined to a hospital for a month due to lung problems. After returning home from work on April 6, 2010, he was rushed to the Imus Family Hospital due to complaints of stomach pain. He was transferred to the ward section of Philippine General Hospital that night.

Mark Escueta, drummer of the band Rivermaya who worked with Palito for the music video of their single "Ambotsa", was first to announce the news of Palito's illness via Facebook. Several young celebrities called for donations through their respective Twitter accounts while help was extended from showbiz colleagues. Among the visitors was former Philippine president Joseph Estrada.

Palito was declared dead at 7:05 a.m. on April 12, 2010, in the Philippine General Hospital from a lung complication. He was cremated and the ashes were kept by his relatives for some years. His ashes were later interred at the columbary of National Shrine and Parish of San Antonio de Padua in Pila, Laguna.

== Filmography ==
=== Film ===
Year	Title	Role
1965	Pitong Zapata	
1973	Palito Pollito	
1976	Barok	
1978	Sabi Barok Lab Ko Dabiana	
1979	Tatay Na Barok	
1979	Al Magat's Mang Kepweng	
1979	Mahal... Ginagabi Ka Na Naman	
1979	Isa... Dalawa... Tatlo... Ang Tatay Kong Kalbo	
1979	Kuwatog	
1980	Nognog	
1980	Juan Tamad Junior	
1980	Hepe	
1980	Darna at Ding	
1980	Enteng-Anting	
1981	Pabling	
1981	A Man Called 'Tolongges'	Djangolat
1981	Iskorokotoy	
1981	Bilibid Gays	
1982	Mga Kanyon ni Mang Simeon	
1982	Manedyer... si Kumander	
1982	Cross My Heart	
1982	Tatlo Silang Tatay Ko	
1983	Mang Kepweng and Son	
1983	Atsay Killer	
1984	Teppanyaki	
1984	Rambo Tan-go	
1984	Give Me Five!	
1984	Barok Goes to Hongkong	
1984	Naku... Ha!	
1985	Super Wan-tu-tri	
1985	John & Marsha '85 (Sa Probinsiya)	
1985	Ride on Baby	Punkistina's Henchman 1
1985	Isang Platitong Mani	
1985	Mga Kwento ni Lola Basyang	Zambo (segment "Zombies")
1985	Rambuto	
1985	Mama Said Papa Said I Love You	
1985	Inday Bote	Duwende
1986	Working Boys	Bogart
1986	Super Islaw and the Flying Kids	Pepe
1986	Rocky Four-ma	
1986	No Blood, No Surrender	
1986	Horsey-horsey: Tigidig-tigidig	Ka Byong
1986	Balimbing (Mga Taong Hunyango)	
1986	James Bone: Agent 001	James Bone
1986	Payaso	
1987	Family Tree	
1988	Love Boat: Mahal Trip Kita	Mandurukot
1988	Kambal Tuko	Papay
1988	Bobo Cop	
1988	Kumander Ahmed Kalansalay	Ahmed Kalansalay
1988	Love Letters	Hercules (segment "Episode 3: Eternally")
1988	Penoy... Balut	
1988	Super Inday and the Golden Bibe	
1988	Sheman: Mistress of the Universe	Skeleton
1988	Pepeng Kuryente: Man with a Thousand Volts	Toothpick
1989	Yes, Yes, Yo, Kabayong Kutsero	
1989	Magic to Love	Payat
1989	Pardina at ang Mga Duwende	Canuto
1989	M & M: The Incredible Twins	
1989	Bote, Dyaryo, Garapa	
1989	Wooly Booly: Ang Classmate Kong Alien	
1990	Twist: Ako si Ikaw, Ikaw si Ako	Watch buyer
1990	Kabayo Kids	Judas
1990	Isang Salop Na Bala	
1992	Pempe ni Sara at Pen	Pempe's passenger
1993	Walang Matigas Na Buto sa Gutom Na Aso	
1994	Sobra Talaga	
1994	Baby Paterno	Dugong pulis
1994	Hataw Tatay Hataw	Don Ramon
1995	Isko: Adventures in Animasia	Mang Amado
1997	Wow... Multo	Elevator man
1997	Sa Iyo ang Itaas, Sa Akin ang Ibaba (ng Bahay)	
1997	Home Along Da Riles Movie 2	Don Narciso
1999	Tik Tak Toys: My Kolokotoys	Man in All White
2002	Home Along da River	Kumander Dengue
2005	Enterpool: S.C.I.A., Senior Citizen in Action	James Bone
2007	Ang M.O.N.A.Y. ni Mr. Shooli (Misteyks Opda Neysion Adres Yata)	
2008	Anak ng Kumander	
2012	Mondomanila	Pablong Shoeshine

=== Television ===
- Home Along Da Riles
- Home Along Da Airport (2003-2005) as Michael
- O-Ha!
- Quizon Avenue
- Pwedeng Pwede (1999-2001) as Tarzing
