= Roi Vinzon =

Filipino actor (born 1953)

- Born: Mark Angelo David-Vinzon; September 20, 1953 (age 73); Manila, Philippines
- Other name: General
- Occupation: Actor
- Years active: 1979–present
- Political party: Lakas (2024–present)
- Other political affiliations: Independent (2012–13)
- Children: 2

Mark Angelo David Vinzon (born September 20, 1953), known professionally as Roi Vinzon, is a Filipino actor. He is best known for his role of Retired General Armando Soriano in the controversial drama My Husband's Lover. His latest films was an indie film Ang Babae sa Sementeryo and Baklas: Human Organs for Sale.

== Political career ==
In 2013, Vinzon ran for a seat as board member of Third District of Pampanga, but lost.

In 2024, he took his oath as member of Lakas–CMD party.

== Filmography ==
=== Film ===
==== As actor ====
- Jaguar (1979) – Edmon
- Hatulan si Jun Bastardo (1980)
- Schoolgirls (1982) - Roi
- Grease Gun Brothers (1985) – Sonny Corsican
- The Moises Padilla Story (The Missing Chapter) (1985)
- American Ninja (1986)
- Ninja Komisyon (1986)
- Bukas Uulan ng Bala (1986)
- James Bone: Agent 007 (1987)
- Lost and Found Command: Rebels Without Because (1987)
- Urban Terrorist (1988)
- Imortal (1989)
- Sunugin si Antero Castro (1989)
- Sa Diyos Lang Ako Susuko (1989) - Arguelio
- Sgt. Melgar (1989)
- Kakampi Ko ang Diyos (1990)
- Jabidah Massacre (1990)
- Ang Utol Kong Hoodlum (1991)
- Boyong Mañalac: Hoodlum Terminator (1991)
- Noel Juico: Batang Kriminal (1991)
- Angelito San Miguel: Mga Batang City Jail (1991)
- Jesus Dela Cruz: Mga Batang Riles (1992)
- Dudurugin Kita ng Bala Ko (1992)
- Kahit Buhay Ko (1992)
- Grease Gun Gang (1992) – Julio
- Dilinger (1992) - Totoy Tari
- Magnong Rehas (1992) - Dado
- Mandurugas (1992)
- Mahirap Maging Pogi (1992) – Richard
- Cordora: Lulutang Ka sa Sarili Mong Dugo (1992)
- Hanggang May Buhay (1992)
- Pacifico Guevarra: Dillinger ng Dose Pares (1992)
- Kahit Ako'y Busabos (1993)
- Rodel Sta. Cruz: Halang ang Bituka (1993)
- Paranaque Bank Robbery: The Joselito Joseco Story (1993)
- Pretty Boy (1993)
- Dalawa Laban sa Mundo: Ang Siga at ang Beauty (1993) – Toro
- Tumbasan Mo ng Buhay (1993)
- Oo Na, Sige Na (1993)
- Mistah (1994) – 1st Lt. Duterte
- Ismael Zacarias (1994) – Enrique Lleva
- Baby Paterno (Dugong Pulis) (1994)
- Col. Billy Bibit, RAM (1994) – Col. Red Kapunan
- Lucas Abelardo (1994) – Lucas Abelardo
- Kapitan Tumba: The Capt. Jose Huevos Story (1995)
- Totoy ng Bangkusay (1996)
- Adan Lazaro (1996) – Adan Lazaro
- Mortal Kong Kaaway, Kaibigan Kong Tunay (1996)
- Mahirap Patayin, Masamang Buhayin (1996)
- Tapusin Natin ang Laban (1997)
- SIG. 357: Baril Mo ang Papatay sa Iyo (1997)
- Sino si Inday Lucing (1997)
- Jesus Salonga, Alyas Boy Indian (1998)
- Wala Ka Nang Lupang Tatapakan (1999)
- Anino (1999)
- Pintado (1999)
- Largado (1999)
- Bayadra Brothers (1999)
- SPO4 Antonio Cuervo: Police (2000)
- Palaban (2000)
- Sgt. Isaias Marcos: Bawat Hakbang Panganib (2000)
- Hindi Sisiw ang Kalaban Mo (2001) – Capt. Aragon
- Hostage (2001)
- Dugong Aso: Mabuting Kaibigan, Masamang Kaaway (2001)
- Batas ng Lansangan (2002) – Carlos
- Kilabot at Kembot (2002)
- Walang Iba Kundi Ikaw (2002)
- Lapu-Lapu (2002) – Datu Zula
- Bertud ng Putik (2003)
- Apoy sa Dibdib ng Samar (2006)
- Batas Militar (2006) – Gen. Castro
- Resiklo (2007) – Hades
- Anak ng Kumander (2008) – Señor Boyong
- Baklas: Human Organs for Sale (2009)
- Ang Babae sa Sementeryo (2010)
- Manila Kingpin: The Asiong Salonga Story (2011) – Viray
- Tiktik: The Aswang Chronicles (2012) – Tatang
- Shake, Rattle and Roll Fourteen: The Invasion ("Lost Command" segment, 2012) – Kapitan Baltog/Col. Rolando Palma
- El Presidente (2012) – Lázaro Segovia
- Daniel Rapido (2013)
- The Fighting Chefs (2013) – Daryl
- Raketeros (2013)
- Boy Golden: Shoot to Kill, the Arturo Porcuna Story (2013) – Alias Tekla
- My Little Bossings (2013) – Andy
- Overtime (2014) – Vicente Alonzo
- Muslim Magnum .357: To Serve and Protect (2014) – Bng. Gen. Gideon de Tagle
- Barbi: D' Wonder Beki (2017)
- Meant to Beh (2017) - Jake

==== As director only ====
- Maria Labo (2015)

=== Television ===
Year	Title	Role	Ref.
1985	Lovingly Yours	Various	
1990	Mother Studio Presents	Various	
1995	GMA Telecine Specials	Various	
1997	GMA True Stories	Various	
1998	Paraiso	?????	
2005	Maynila	Various	
2008	Babangon Ako't Dudurugin Kita	Roberto	
2011	PNP Pacers	Himself	
2013	Indio	Makaptan	
2013	My Husband's Lover	Armando Soriano	
2013	Katipunan	Padre Villalon	
2014	Carmela: Ang Pinakamagandang Babae sa Mundong Ibabaw	Fernando Torres	
2015	Second Chances	Federico Villacorta	
2015	Alamat	Maestro	
2015	Karelasyon: Kasambahay	Lloyd	
2015	Juan Tamad	George Damat-Magbangon	
2016	A1 Ko Sa 'Yo	Primo	
2016	Encantadia	Arvak	
2017	Mulawin vs. Ravena	Daragit	
2018	Sherlock Jr.	Conrado "Rado" Nuñez	
2018	Contessa	Don Felipe	
2018	Pamilya Roces	Rodolfo "Rod" Gardamonte Roces	
2019	Cain at Abel	Don Diego Javellana Garcia	
2020	Descendants of the Sun	Abraham Manalo	
2021	Agimat ng Agila	Alejandro Dominguez	
2021	To Have & to Hold	Giovanni Ramirez	
2021–2022	FPJ's Ang Probinsyano	Eduardo Guillermo	
2022–2023	The Iron Heart	Hector Adelantar	
2023	One Piece (2023 TV series)	Shanks	
2023–2024	Black Rider	Sen. William Romero	
2024	Walang Matigas na Pulis sa Matinik na Misis	Vito Poblete	
2025	Sanggang-Dikit FR	Mayor Juaquin “El Hipe” Guerrero	
2025	Pinoy Big Brother: Celebrity Collab Edition 2.0	Houseguest	
2025–2026	FPJ's Batang Quiapo	Brando Mondragon	
2026	Kamao	Domeng Batumbakal	

== Awards ==
Year	Award-giving body	Category	Work	Result
1994	Metro Manila Film Festival	Best Actor	Lucas Abelardo	Won
2007	Metro Manila Film Festival	Best Supporting Actor	Resiklo	Won
