= Anak ng Kumander =

2008 Filipino action film

- Directed by: Jose "Kaka" Balagtas
- Screenplay by: Rod Santiago
- Story by: MP; KB
- Produced by: J. Kaka Balagtas; Manny Pacquiao; Nanay Dionisia; Bobby Pacquiao; Rogelio Pacquiao
- Starring: Manny Pacquiao; Ara Mina
- Cinematography: Jun Dalawis
- Edited by: Danny G. Añonuevo
- Music by: Tris Suguitan
- Production company: MP Promotions
- Distributed by: Solar Pictures
- Release date: January 1, 2008
- Running time: 110 minutes
- Country: Philippines
- Language: Filipino
- Box office: ₱2.5 million

Anak ng Kumander (transl. Child of the Commander) is a 2008 Filipino action film directed by Jose "Kaka" Balagtas, written by Rod Santiago, and starring Manny Pacquiao and Ara Mina. The film was released on January 1, 2008, as part of the 33rd Metro Manila Film Festival. This film marked the final appearance of Palito during his lifetime before his death.

== Cast ==
- Manny Pacquiao as Kummander Idel
- Ara Mina as Sandra Regalado
- Valerie Concepcion as Ka Maya
- Lara Morena as Ka Lara
- Rogelio Pacquiao as Lt. Paredes
- Roi Vinzon as Señor Boyong
- Dante Rivero as Commander Oyong
- Perla Bautista as Aling Marcela
- Efren Reyes Jr. as Mayor Isaac Albor
- Danny Labra as Pinggot
- Cris Aguilar as Turalde
- Jess Sanchez as Rabio
- Long Mejia
- Richard Duran as Carpio
- Dan Alvaro as Sergeant Oste
- Boy Roque as Rivero
- Joe Balagtas as Captain Hadjie
- Palito as Mang Puroy

== Production ==
Filming ended on November 20, 2007, in San Leonardo, Nueva Ecija.
