= Ikon Asean =

Ikon Asean is a regional music award designed to showcase and recognize talented artists from countries such as Malaysia, Indonesia and the Philippines. The First Ikon Asean was held on August 12, 2007 in Malaysia.

Vina Morales and Kjwan, both from the Philippines, won the first title of Ikon Asean for Solo and Group categories, respectively. Each took home US$25,000 (RM86,900) and a trophy.

Prior to the competition, each country held their own Ikon competitions (Ikon Indonesia, Ikon Malaysia, and Ikon Philippines). Winners from the respective countries would compete for Ikon Asean.

The winners in the finals will come solely from the decision of the panel of judges (without SMS voting). However, in the local Ikon competitions, 30 percent came from SMS votes. The panel is composed of Malaysian musician Mac Chew, Indonesian singer Hetty Koes Endang, Filipino singer Eugene R. Villaluz and Singaporean composer Iskandar Mirza Ismail.

Vina Morales sing's Pangako sa 'Yo (A Promise to You), a song from a popular drama series "The Promise", and Feels So Nice.

Kjwan sing's Invitation and One Look.
