= Utang ng Ama =

Philippine comedy film

- Directed by: Tony Y. Reyes
- Written by: Mel Mendoza-del Rosario
- Produced by: Eric Cuatico
- Starring: Joey Marquez; Jinggoy Estrada
- Cinematography: Ely Cruz
- Edited by: Rene Dugtong
- Music by: Elhmir Saison
- Production company: Maverick Films
- Distributed by: Maverick Films
- Release date: October 22, 2003
- Running time: 100 minutes
- Country: Philippines
- Language: Filipino

Utang ng Ama is a 2003 Philippine comedy film directed by Tony Y. Reyes. The film stars Joey Marquez and Jinggoy Estrada. This is the last film produced by Maverick Films before closing shop.

== Plot ==
Don (Joey Marquez) and Ruel (Jinggoy Estrada) had been best of friends since childhood. Their respective fathers, Ipe and Rudy, were also best friends. When Rudy had to go to Indonesia to work, he left behind Ruel under the care of Ipe, whom he also borrowed money from. Years have passed and both Ipe and Rudy have died but the friendship is solid between Don and Ruel, with the debt of Rudy to Ipe still unpaid. A girl, Justine (Katya Santos), comes between them and tries to ruin their rock-solid friendship.

== Cast ==
- Joey Marquez as Don
- Jinggoy Estrada as Ruel
- Katya Santos as Justine
- Ruby Rodriguez as Ginger
- Phillip Salvador as Ipe
- Rudy Fernandez as Rudy
- Gary Lising as Pepe
- Cesar Montano as Self
- Ronnie Ricketts as Police Jailguard
- Lorna Tolentino as Doctora
- Bayani Agbayani as Bro. Bayani
- Vhong Navarro as Babaero
- Cynthia Yapchiongco as Madel
- Soxy Topacio as Direk
- La Bacci as Producer
- Yoyong Martirez as Konsehal
- Philip Cesar as Buyer
- Mahal as Nuno sa Punso
- Dagul as JR
- Baldo Marro as Boy Yabang
- Val Iglesias as Dong Yabang
- Rudy Meyer as Police Sergeant
- Danny Labra as Boy Balisong
- Gerald Ejercito as Bookies
- Jinky Oda as Faith Healer
- Joanne Salazar as Don's Girl
