= Jose Ejercito =

Jose Ejercito may refer to:

- real name of Jinggoy Estrada (born 1963), Filipino politician and film actor
- real name of Joseph Estrada (born 1937), Filipino politician and former actor
