= Juan & Ted: Wanted =

- Official movie poster
- Directed by: Al Tantay
- Screenplay by: Rolf Mahilom
- Story by: Al Tantay; Bayani Agbayani; Rolf Mahilom; Dan Salamante; Sherwin Buenvenida
- Produced by: Vicente G. Del Rosario III
- Starring: Janno Gibbs; Bayani Agbayani
- Cinematography: George Tutanes
- Edited by: Danny Gloria
- Music by: Reuben Cadsawan; Dan Salamante
- Production company: Viva Films
- Distributed by: Viva Films
- Release date: December 6, 2000
- Running time: 115 minutes
- Country: Philippines
- Language: Filipino

Juan & Ted: Wanted is a 2000 Philippine comedy film co-written and directed by Al Tantay. The film stars Janno Gibbs and Bayani Agbayani in their respective title roles.

The film is streaming online on YouTube.

== Plot ==
Fugitives Juancho (Janno Gibbs) and Ted (Bayani Agbayani), escape jail and their captors, Hepe (Jovit Moya) and Sgt. Langku (Boy Alano). They integrate into society by working as a school bus driver and conductor. As an incentive, Ted is allowed to continue with his education while Juancho works double time with his education and aids him with his other needs in school. They also develop a special bond with the students, whom they realize have problems of their own. They soon decide to go AWOL in order to take a break from their problems. As they try to return to school, they are intercepted by a gang of bank robbers who take them hostage. But Juan and Ted incite the students to start a riot, disorienting the robbers and causing the bus to teeter on the edge of the ravine. All the passengers escape before the bus plunges and explodes at the bottom, but Juan and Ted are arrested again when the police arrive. However, they are released on their trial when it is revealed that they were framed by their arresting officers for kidnapping.

== Cast ==
- Janno Gibbs as Juancho
- Bayani Agbayani as Ted
- Anne Curtis as Hazel
- Maureen Larrazabal as Nurse Suzy
- Vanna Garcia as Miki
- Angela Velez as Vivien
- Carla Guevarra as Sarah
- Jovit Moya as Hepe
- Boy Alano as Sgt. Langku
- Inday Badiday as Judge
- Inday Garutay as Stenographer
- Chubi del Rosario as Roberto
- JR Trinidad as Chito
- Marky Lopez as Mon
- Rico J. Puno as Mr. Mariano
- Dan Salamante
- Hyubs Azarcon as Nick
- Philip Supnet as Pong
- Dagul as Chuck
- Al Tantay as Father of Roberto
