= Sagot Kita, Mula Ulo Hanggang Paa =

Philippine action comedy film

Sagot Kita Mula Ulo Hanggang Paa
- Directed by: Felix E. Dalay
- Screenplay by: Felix E. Dalay; Senen Dimaguila; Willy Laconsay
- Story by: Felix E. Dalay
- Produced by: Eric Cuatico
- Starring: Jinggoy Estrada; Vina Morales
- Cinematography: Ver Dauz
- Edited by: Renato de Leon
- Music by: William Yusi
- Production company: Millennium Cinema
- Distributed by: Millennium Cinema
- Release date: November 1, 2000
- Running time: 110 minutes
- Country: Philippines
- Language: Filipino

Sagot Kita Mula Ulo Hanggang Paa is a 2000 Philippine action comedy film written and directed by Felix E. Dalay. The film stars Jinggoy Estrada and Vina Morales.

== Cast ==
- Jinggoy Estrada as Ador
- Vina Morales as Ma. Cecilia
- Joko Diaz as Butch
- Dick Israel as Bong
- George Javier as Elvis
- Perla Bautista as Maring
- Berting Labra as Kapitan
- Noreen Aguas as Nadia
- Conrad Poe as Madam X
- Vic Felipe as Mr. Wang
- Dianne Perez as Kapitan's Daughter
