= Vina Morales =

Filipino actress and singer (born 1975)

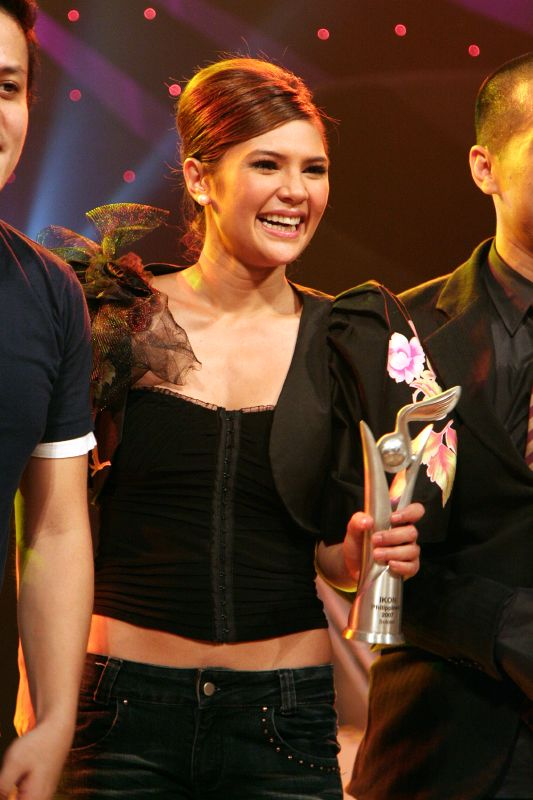
- Morales at the Ikon Asean competition in 2007, with her IKON Philippines trophy
- Born: Sharon Garcia Magdayao; October 17, 1975 (age 51); Bogo, Cebu, Philippines
- Occupations: Singer; actress; model; businesswoman
- Years active: 1986–present
- Agent: Star Magic (2007–present)
- Children: 1
- Relatives: Shaina Magdayao (sister); Luis Gabriel Moreno (nephew); Maricel Morales (cousin)
- Musical career
- Genres: Pop; OPM
- Instrument: Vocals
- Years active: 1987–present
- Labels: Star Music; PolyEast Records; Viva Records

Sharon Garcia Magdayao (Tagalog: [ˈʃaɾɔn gaɾˈsɪa maɡˈdɐjaʊ]; born October 17, 1975), known professionally as Vina Morales (Tagalog: [ˈbɪnɐ mɔˈɾalɛs]), is a Filipino singer and actress. She began performing at her local church as a child and first gained recognition after winning the Cebu Pop Music Festival in 1986. She began releasing studio albums while simultaneously appearing in numerous films and television productions. Magdayao has been the recipient of an Ikon Asean Award and six Awit Awards. She has also been nominated for two FAMAS Awards, a Gawad Urian, and a Metro Manila Film Festival Award.

== Early life ==
Sharon Garcia Magdayao was born in Bogo, Cebu, on October 17, 1975, to parents Enrique Magdayao of Cebu and Deanna Rose Garcia-Magdayao of Padada, Davao del Sur. She has three siblings, including the actress Shaina Magdayao. Morales attended Bogo Central School for her first three years of elementary education before transferring to Immaculate Conception Parish School in Quezon City, where she completed her primary education. She continued her first two years in Quezon City for the remainder of high school at the same institution before shifting to homeschooling due to her show business commitments. She never attended college for the same reasons.

== Career ==
At the age of nine, Magdayao joined the choir of Saint Vincent Ferrer Parish Church in Bogo. Her father, Fritz T. Malinao, a songwriter and active member of the church community, recognized her vocal ability and selected her to perform one of his compositions at the Cebu Pop Music Festival. Her entry, "Paglaum" (Cebuano for "Hope"), won the Grand Prize and earned her the Best Interpreter Award for young performers in the Philippines.

Her performance drew the attention of Viva Films representatives, led by Jesus "Boy" Bosque, who offered her a singing and acting contract. Magdayao and her family subsequently relocated to Manila, where she auditioned for roles in the Philippine film industry. Vic del Rosario Jr. and Mina Aragon gave her the screen name Vina Morales in memory of their deceased daughter, Vina Vanessa.

=== Acting career ===
Morales made her film debut in Nakagapos na Puso, appearing alongside Sharon Cuneta. As a teenager, she appeared in several youth-oriented comedy films, including Estudyante Blues and Teacher’s Enemy No. 1. By 1991, she had transitioned to leading roles, starring opposite Robin Padilla in Ang Utol Kong Hoodlum. In 1994, she headlined her first solo feature film, Anghel na Walang Langit.

In 1996, Morales left Viva Films and signed a non-exclusive agreement with APT Entertainment and OctoArts Films. During this period, she appeared in Lab n Kisses and 'Wag na 'Wag Kang Lalayo. She also portrayed the title role in The Sarah Balabagan Story. In 2000, Morales signed an exclusive contract with Millennium Cinema, where she starred in Eto Na Naman Ako and Sagot Kita Mula Ulo Hanggang Paa.

In 2007, she starred in ABS-CBN's soap opera Maria Flordeluna. In 2010, Morales was cast as Mercedes Cristi in the series Agua Bendita. The following year, she played her first antagonist role, Cecile Altamira, in Nasaan Ka, Elisa?, a remake of the Chilean telenovela ¿Dónde está Elisa?. She played the role of Cecile Altamira, sister of Mariano Altamira (Albert Martinez) and wife of Bruno de Silva (Eric Fructuoso).

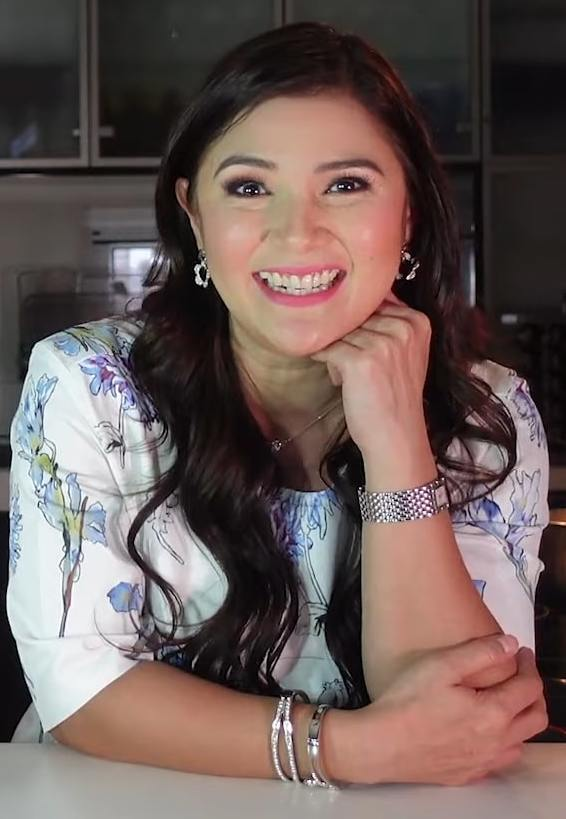
Morales in 2021

In 2013, Morales was cast as Magnolia Alegre in the primetime drama Maria Mercedes. She later made returned to film with Robin Padilla in the 2014 Metro Manila Film Festival entry Bonifacio: Ang Unang Pangulo. In 2015, she starred as Cecilia Macaraeg in the afternoon drama Nasaan Ka Nang Kailangan Kita, followed by a role in the 2016 romantic drama Born for You. In 2018, she played her second antagonist role, Celestina de Alegre, in Precious Hearts Romances presents Araw Gabi.

In 2023, she made her Broadway debut as Aurora Aquino in Here Lies Love. By 2025, she had rejoined GMA Network and appeared on the game show Rainbow Rumble, broadcast on the Kapamilya Channel, A2Z, and All TV.

=== Music career ===
During the early 2000s, Morales focused on her music career. She performed in live concerts in the Philippines, including 2004's Mamahalin Ka Niya. She co-wrote the lyrics to "Paano Kaya Magtatagpo?" with actor Piolo Pascual; the pair recorded the song as a duet composed by Arnel de Pano. In 2003, she embarked on a multi-city United States tour titled 'Vina Revealed' and 'Vina's Hot'. She became the first Filipina to sing at the New York International Music Festival held at the Palms Hotel in Las Vegas.

In 2006, she undertook a second tour of the United States. Morales represented the Philippines at the 2007 Ikon Asean singing contest, where she won the competition. Additionally, she co-hosted a series of Philippine shows with Martin Nievera in the United States and Canada.

== Personal life ==
Morales is the sister of actress and dancer Shaina Magdayao. She has a daughter named Ceana, who was born on April 25, 2009.

In May 2018, the Mandaluyong City Regional Trial Court, under Judge Anthony Fama, convicted Morales' former partner, Cedric Lee, for the 2016 kidnapping of their daughter. Morales had accused Lee of keeping their then seven-year-old child for nine days without her consent. The court ordered Lee to pay a ₱300 fine, along with ₱50,000 in nominal and moral damages to Morales.

Between 2022 and 2024, Morales was in a romantic relationship with an American national, Andrew Kovalcin.

== Filmography ==
=== Film ===
Year	Title	Role
1986	Nakagapos na Puso	Mitzi Delfino
1986	Captain Barbell	Kidnap Victim
1987	Kung Aagawin Mo ang Lahat sa Akin	Young Maureen
1988	Kumander Bawang: Kalaban ng Mga Aswang	Vinia
1989	Ang Lahat ng Ito Pati Na ang Langit	Gene Rose
1989	Bondying: The Little Big Boy	Bingbing
1989	Bakit Iisa Lamang ang Puso	Ging
1989	Abot Hanggang Sukdulan	Carmi
1989	Estudyante Blues	Bebs
1989	Wooly Booly: Ang Classmate Kong Alien	Susie
1990	Tootsie Wootsie: Ang Bandang Walang Atrasan	
1990	Love at First Sight	Roselle
1990	Petrang Kabayo 2: Anong Ganda Mo! Mukha Kang Kabayo	Pinky
1990	Teacher's Enemy No. 1	Trixie
1990	Wooly Booly 2: Ang Titser Kong Alien	Girlie
1991	Maging Sino Ka Man	Loleng
1991	Alyas Batman en Robin	Vina
1991	Ang Utol Kong Hoodlum	Bing
1991	Darna	Angel
1992	Miss Na Miss Kita (Utol Kong Hoodlum II)	Bing
1993	Sana'y Ikaw Na Nga	Jessica
1993	Hanggang Saan, Hanggang Kailan	Jocelyn Ilustre
1993	Sala sa Init, Sala sa Lamig	Trina
1994	Pinagbiyak na Bunga: Lookalayk	Kathy
1994	Kadenang Bulaklak	Jasmin Abolencia
1994	The Untold Story: Vizconde Massacre II – May the Lord Be with Us!	Carmela Vizconde
1994	Anghel na Walang Langit	Angela Pelayo / Anita Cornejo
1994	Ang Pagbabalik ni Pedro Penduko	Anna
1995	The Grepor Butch Belgica Story	Meth - Girlfriend No. 4
1995	Campus Girls	Vangie
1995	Love Notes	Tricia
1995	The Flor Contemplacion Story	Russel Contemplacion
1995	Huwag Mong Isuko ang Laban	Cecilia
1996	April Boys: Sana'y Mahalin Mo Rin Ako	Letty
1996	Lab en Kisses	Kisses
1996	Wag na 'Wag Kang Lalayo	Raquel Garcia
1997	The Sarah Balabagan Story	Sarah Balabagan
1999	Di Puwedeng Hindi Puwede!	Kristine
1999	Ako'y Ibigin Mo... Lalaking Matapang	Violy
1999	Ang Boyfriend Kong Pari	Reggie Santos
2000	Eto Na Naman Ako	Ana María Ledesma
2000	Sagot Kita Mula Ulo Hanggang Paa	Ma. Cecilia
2014	Bonifacio: Ang Unang Pangulo	Gregoria de Jesús / Oriang
2019	Damaso	Sisa
2024	Sunny	Annie

=== Television ===
Year	Title	Role	Notes
1987–1996	That's Entertainment	Herself / Co-host	
1990	Buddy en Sol	Lolit	
1991	Maalaala Mo Kaya		Episode: "Rubber Shoes"
1993–1994	Vina		
1996–1997	Lyra	Edene	
1997–1999	SOP		
1997	Maalaala Mo Kaya		Episode: "Puting panyo"
1998	Binhi		Film broadcast on television
1999	Maalaala Mo Kaya	Marissa	Episode: Lollipop
2000	Maalaala Mo Kaya		Episode: Boses
2000	Codename: Verano	Carmela Bernardo	
2001–present	ASAP		
2002	Maalaala Mo Kaya		Episode: Litrato
2003	Maalaala Mo Kaya	Joey Albert	Episode: Ice Cream
2003	Darating ang Umaga	Arriana B. Cordero / Anya	Main Cast / Protagonist
2006	Maalaala Mo Kaya	Diana del Mundo	Episode: "Bahay"
2007	Maria Flordeluna	Maria Elvira Aragoncillo-Alicante	
2007	IKON Philippines	Herself	
2007	Maalaala Mo Kaya	Elsa	Episode: Telebisyon
2009	Wowowee	Herself / Performer	
2010	May Bukas Pa	Choir Member	
2010	Agua Bendita	Mercedes Montenegro-Cristi	Main Cast / Protagonist
2011	Star Circle Quest: The Search for the Next Kiddie Superstar	Judge	
2011	Wansapanataym	Mia Gonzales	Episode: "Ulo"
2011–2012	Nasaan Ka, Elisa?	Cecilia "Cecile" Altamira-de Silva	Main Cast / Antagonist
2012	Maalaala Mo Kaya	Jane	Episode: "Belo"
2012	Wansapanataym	Susan	Episode: "Maya Aksaya"
2012	Wansapanataym	Olivia	Episode: "Yaya Yaya Puto Maya"
2013	May Isang Pangarap	Karina "Kare" Rodriguez	
2013	Wansapanataym	Flory del Rosario	Episode: "Mommy On Duty"
2013–2014	Maria Mercedes	Magnolia Alegre	
2014	Maalaala Mo Kaya	Bambi	Episode: "Cellphone"
2014	Ipaglaban Mo!	Dra. Karen Villaruel	Episode: "Ako Ang Iyong Ina"
2015	Nasaan Ka Nang Kailangan Kita	Cecilia Macaraeg-Natividad	Main Cast / Protagonist
2015	Maalaala Mo Kaya	Charito Tiquia	Episode: "Rosas"
2016	Ipaglaban Mo!	Mylene	Episode: "Pagkakamali"
2016	Born for You	Catherine "Cathy" Pelayo-Reyes	Main Cast / Protagonist
2018	Precious Hearts Romances Presents: Araw Gabi	Celestina De Alegre	Main Cast / Antagonist
2019	Maalaala Mo Kaya	Raquel	Episode: "White Ribbon"
2019	Maalaala Mo Kaya	Cecil	Episode: "Flyers"
2019–2020	Sandugo	Cordelia Nolasco-Balthazar	Main Cast / Anti-Hero
2020	Maalaala Mo Kaya	Elvira	Episode: "Ilog"
2020	Tagisan Ng Galing	Judge	
2020	Kesayasaya	Ms. K	
2021	It's Showtime : Hide and Sing	TagoKanta no. 1	Celebrity Singer
2021–2022	Marry Me, Marry You	Marvi Jacinto	Main Cast / Protagonist
2025–2026	Cruz vs Cruz	Felma Cruz	Main Cast / Protagonist
2025	All-Out Sundays	Herself	Guest performer
2025	Rainbow Rumble	Herself	Contestant
2026–present	Born to Shine	Ysadara "Dara" Halari	Supporting Cast / Antagonist / Anti-Hero

== Stage ==
Year	Production	Role	Notes
2012	Rock of Ages	Sherrie Christian	Philippine production by Atlantis Productions; Morales's theatrical debut.
2023	Here Lies Love	Aurora Aquino	Broadway Theatre, New York; Broadway debut. Morales performed in the role from September 22 to October 22, 2023.

== Discography ==
- Vina (1990), Viva
- Forbidden (1992), Viva
- Pag Katabi Kita (1994), Viva
- Easy to Love (1995), OctoArts-EMI
- Look at Me Now (1996), OctoArts-EMI
- All That I Want (1998), OctoArts-EMI
- No Limits (1999), OctoArts-EMI
- Total Control (2001), OctoArts-EMI
- Reflections (2002), OCtoArts-EMI
- Mamahalin Ka Niya (2004), Star
- Nobody Does It Better (2005), Star
- Awit ng Ating Buhay (2010), Star
- Vina Morales (30th Anniversary Album) (2016), Star

=== Compilation albums ===
- Best of Vina (1993), Viva
- The Best of Love Duets (Viva Collection Forever) (1998), Viva
- Vina: Silver Series (2006), Viva

== Awards ==
Year	Award giving body	Category	Nominated work	Results
1996	Awit Awards	Best Female Recording Artist	"Easy To Love"	Won
2000	Awit Awards	Album of the Year	"No Limits"	Won
