= Henry Alcantara =

Filipino civil engineer

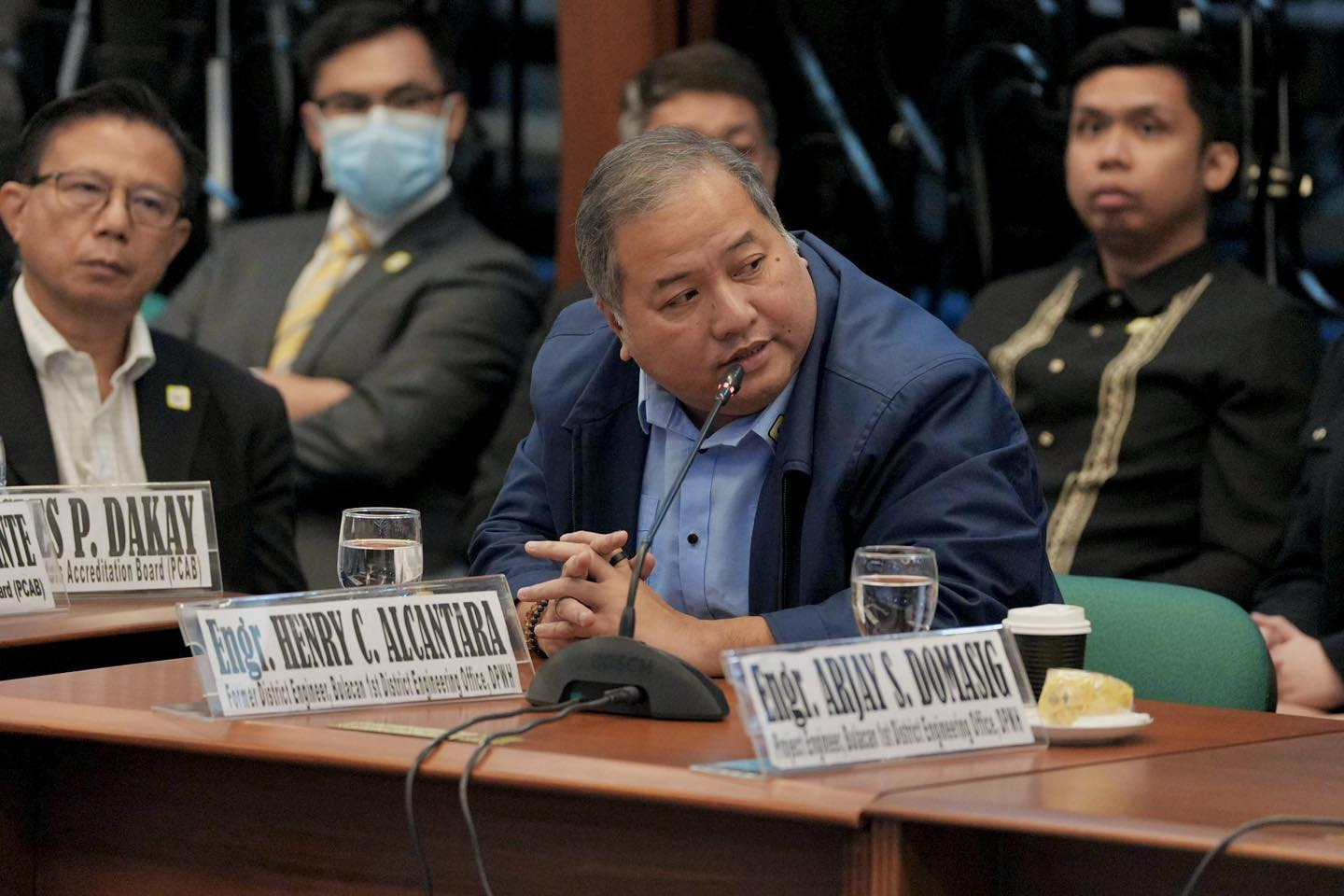
Alcantara during the Blue Ribbon Committee hearing in 2025

Henry C. Alcantara is a Filipino former civil engineer and government official. He worked in the Department of Public Works and Highways (DPWH), where he rose from the ranks starting in the 1994 until he held leadership roles at the district and regional level. He was a central figure in the flood control projects controversy in August 2025, identified as the primary individual and main suspect who certified the ghost project in Piel, Baliwag, Bulacan. Aside from this, he is also associated with the so-called "BGC Boys", a group allegedly linked to questionable dealings and political controversies. In September 2025, he was found guilty of grave misconduct over Bulacan Flood Control mess.

== Early life and education ==
Henry C. Alcantara was hailed in Bocaue, Bulacan. He studied civil engineering at the University of Santo Tomas, where he earned his degree before joining public service.

== Career ==
Alcantara began his career in the Department of Public Works and Highways (DPWH) in 1994. He started as a casual employee and gradually moved up through different technical and administrative positions.

In 2019, he was appointed as the District Engineer of the DPWH Bulacan First District Engineering Office, where he oversaw public works and infrastructure projects across several municipalities, including Malolos, Calumpit, Baliwag, and Hagonoy.

Later, Alcantara also served as Assistant Regional Director and Officer-in-Charge (OIC) of DPWH Region IV-A, helping manage projects across the region.

== Controversy ==
In 2025, the Senate Blue Ribbon Committee investigated reports of flood control projects in Bulacan that were described as "ghost projects," or projects that were funded but allegedly not completed. Alcantara, who was then the district engineer, was asked about these projects during hearings. During the hearings, Alcantara admitted that he had received luxury vehicles and a watch from some of his subordinates. He explained that the items were later returned, but lawmakers questioned why such gifts were given in the first place.

The Department of Public Works and Highways also filed administrative cases against Alcantara, finding him guilty of certain irregularities in project implementation. He later declined to sign waivers for his bank and phone records when requested by senators, saying he wanted to consult his lawyers before taking further steps.

A separate controversy also arose when a photo circulated showing Alcantara together with Senator Jinggoy Estrada. The picture was presented during a House hearing by former assistant district engineer Brice Ericson Hernandez. Lawmakers said it raised questions about Alcantara's connections with certain politicians, though Alcantara and others responded that the image did not prove wrongdoing.

Alcantara returned ₱110 million, a move which was described by his lawyer, Justice Secretary Frederick Vida as part of the restitution process in the government’s investigation into the flood control controversy, particularly in Bulacan.

The Professional Regulation Commission (PRC) revoked Alcantara's license for gross unprofessional and unethical conduct linked to the flood control controversy.
