= Walang Iwanan... Peksman! =

Philippine action comedy film

- Directed by: Toto Natividad
- Written by: Henry Nadong
- Produced by: Toto Natividad
- Starring: Jinggoy Estrada; Judy Ann Santos
- Cinematography: Ramon Marcelino
- Edited by: Ruben Natividad
- Music by: Edwin Ortega
- Production company: Jolo Films
- Distributed by: Jolo Films
- Release date: January 9, 2002
- Running time: 110 minutes
- Country: Philippines
- Language: Filipino

Walang Iwanan... Peksman! is a 2002 Philippine romantic action comedy film produced and directed by Toto Natividad. The film stars Jinggoy Estrada and Judy Ann Santos. By the time the film was released on January 9, 2002, Jinggoy Estrada was still detained with his father, former president Joseph Estrada, at the Veterans Memorial Medical Center.

== Cast ==
- Jinggoy Estrada as Carding
- Judy Ann Santos as Helen
- Bayani Agbayani as Bodong
- Ace Espinosa as Jo Del Gado
- Pyar Mirasol as Jinky
- Robert Arevalo as Helen's Father
- Travador Ramos as Capt. Fidel Moreno
- Izza Ignacio as Julie
- Romy Diaz as Oscar
- Minnie Aguilar as Betty
- Rommel Montano as Ariel
- Val Iglesias as Tata Simon
- Bryan Homecillo as Bong
- Kuya Cesar as priest
- Maning Bato as Patient
- Jimmy Regino as himself
- Vingo Regino as himself
- Torling Pader as Karyong Kilatis
- Boy Gomez as Asiong Akyat
- Philip Supnet as Michael
- Jaime Cuales as Pepeng Pingas
- Ate Guy as Binong Bading
- Tacio Tangkad as Jordan
- Josie Tagle as Landlady
- Tessie Villarama as Helen's mother
- Banjo Romero as Jo's Henchman
- Boy Roque as Ariel's Henchman
- Malou Crisologo as Denver's nanny
- Rene Matias as police victim
- Rey Solo as taxi driver victim
- Nonong Talbo as priest
- Lucy Quinto as Raquedan's wife
- Vic Felipe as warden
- Manuel Montemayor as police asset
- Ernie Forte as Berting's asset

== Production ==
Initially produced by Millennium Cinema, the film was supposed to be part of the 2000 Metro Manila Film Festival, but production was put on hold, with Jinggoy Estrada being part of the committee. Ping Lacson: Supercop, also directed by Toto Natividad, took over its place. When Millennium closed shop at the start of 2001, Natividad took over the film's production under the Jolo Films banner. It was later on supposed to be part of the 2001 Metro Manila Film Festival, but was not able to make it to the cut-off. Its playdate was set to early January 2002.
