= Katas ng Saudi =

- Directed by: Jose Javier Reyes
- Written by: Jose Javier Reyes
- Produced by: Charyl Chan-De Guzman (associate)
- Starring: Jinggoy Estrada
- Cinematography: Lito Mempin
- Edited by: Renewin Alano
- Music by: Jesse Lucas
- Production company: Maverick Films
- Release date: December 25, 2007
- Country: Philippines
- Language: Filipino

Katas ng Saudi (transl. Essence of Saudi) is a 2007 Philippine comedy drama film directed by Jose Javier Reyes under Maverick Films. The film revolves around an Overseas Filipino Worker who returns to the Philippines from Saudi Arabia after working for ten years to reunite with his family.

== Cast ==
- Jinggoy Estrada as Oca
- Lorna Tolentino as Marcy, Oca's wife
- Arron Villaflor as Ryan, Oca's son, who is suspected to be gay due to being engrossed with his studies and not dating.
- Bayani Agbayani as Pol, Oca's best friend
- Eugene Domingo as Tessie
- Shaina Magdayao as Cathy, Oca's daughter
- Rayver Cruz as Kyle, a suitor of Magdayao's character
- Julian Estrada as Biboy, Oca's son
- Vangie Labalan as Mameng, Oca's mother
- Liza Lorena as Noemi
- Dick Israel
- Mandy Ochoa
- Ernie Zarate

== Production ==
Katas ng Saudi was produced under Maverick Films which is associated with the Estrada political family. The film risked not being completed due to controversies of former President Joseph Estrada was facing which rendered the politician hesitant to provide funding for the film. Lead actor Jinggoy Estrada managed to convince his father to give greenlight to the film relying on the film's theme of tackling issues of Overseas Filipino Workers. The film was also used as an opportunity to introduce Jinggoy's son Julian in the film industry.

== Release ==
Katas ng Saudi was released in the Philippines on December 25, 2007, as one of the official entries of the 2007 Metro Manila Film Festival.
