= List of Goin' Bulilit cast members =

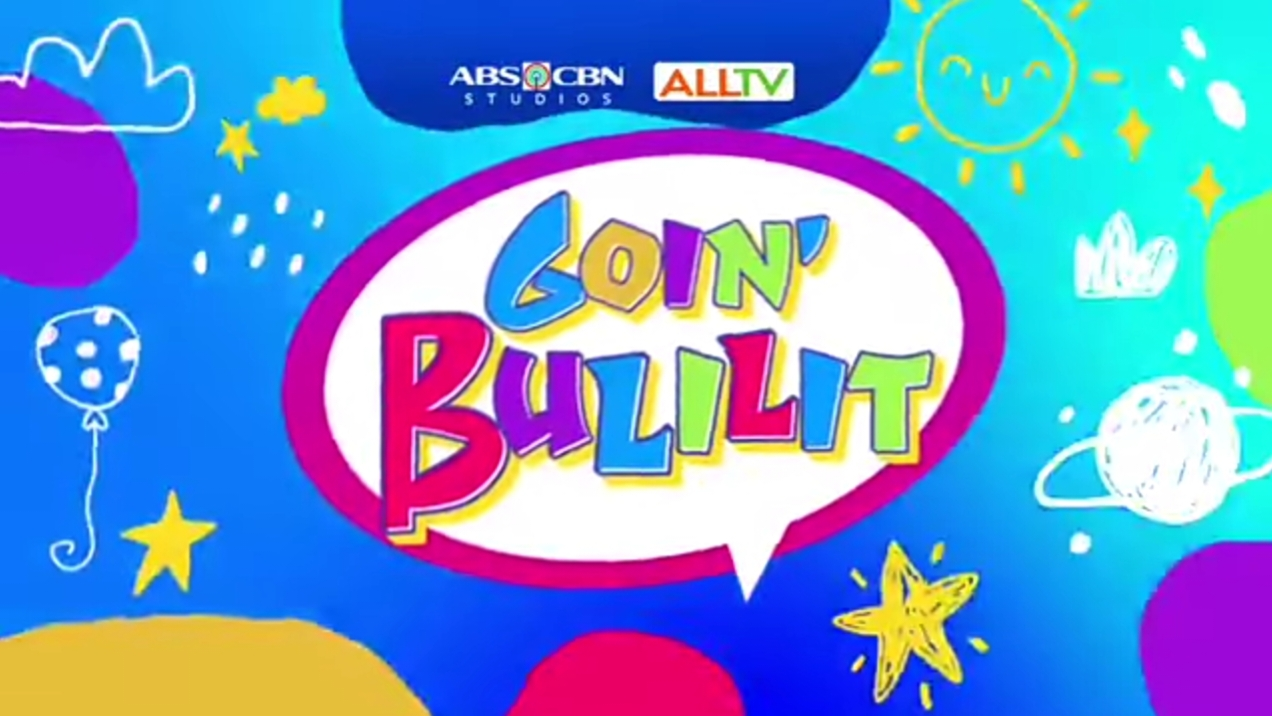
Goin' Bulilit title card

The following is a list of Goin' Bulilit cast members, past and present, according to their respective batches, along with the guest performers.

== Final cast ==
Except for Dagul and Baby Giant, the show's cast is composed exclusively of children, with an enforced age limit of twelve to thirteen years. When cast members surpass this age limit, they "graduate" from the show. Before their departure, these graduating members are featured in a special farewell episode. In this episode, the current cast sings songs, and a video montage of the graduates' memorable moments is shown. Alumni of the show, along with the graduates, attend the episode to bid their goodbyes.

=== Graduations and songs ===
Each year (except 2005, 2010 and 2012) have their own "farewell song" played to the bulilits leaving the show. 2007 and 2008 are the only years where two graduations occurred. Memories of the graduating bulilits would play during the song (with the exception of the first graduation, which was played during their testimonials. From the second graduation and so on, alumnis of the show return to witness another former "bulilit" graduating the show, which they are considered a “guest”.

- 1st Graduation Night (March 5, 2006) - "Farewell" by Raymond Lauchengco
- 2nd Graduation Night (February 11, 2007) - "Awit ng Barkada" by APO Hiking Society
- 3rd Graduation Night (June 17, 2007) - "Through The Years" by Kenny Rogers
- 4th Graduation (March 2, 2008) (4th graduation night) - "Kanlungan" by Noel Cabangon
- 5th Graduation (October 19, 2008) - "Family" (from the 2006 film, Dreamgirls)
- 6th Graduation Night (October 25, 2009) - "Special" Memory by Lea Salonga
- 7th Graduation Night (September 18, 2011) - "Best Friends Forever" by Tweens of Pop (Aaliyah, Mika and Noemi part) and "One Friend" by Dan Seals (Nash and Sharlene part)
- 8th Graduation Night (February 24, 2013) - "In My Dreams" by Reo Speedwagon (Alexa and Angel part with Nash Aguas and Angelo Garcia) and "True Colors" by Cyndi Lauper (Kobi, Aaron, and Andre part w/ Sharlene San Pedro, Mika Dela Cruz, Noemi Oineza, and Aaliyah Benisano)
- 9th Graduation Night (March 23, 2014) - "Ngiti" by Young JV ft. Gary Valenciano
- 10th Graduation Night (August 30, 2015) - "See You Again" by Wiz Khalifa ft. Charlie Puth
- 11th Graduation Night (February 28, 2016) - "You're My best Friend" by Nelson del Castro
- 12th Graduation Night (April 2, 2017) - "True Colors" by Justin Timberlake and Anna Kendrick (from the 2016 film Trolls)
- 13th Graduation Night (February 25, 2018) - "I Can" by Donna, Regine and Mikee
- 14th Graduation Night (March 10, 2019) - "Salamat" by Yeng Constantino

=== Goin' Bulilit cast members that never graduate ===
Goin' Bulilit cast with dwarfism, these cast members never graduate.

- Romeo "Dagul" Pastrana (2005–19)
- Renz Joshua "Baby Giant" Baña (2024)

=== Final cast of the second incarnation ===
- Adam Jordan Lim (2019; 2024; moved to Sparkle GMA Artist Center)
- Ahmad Abukuwaik (2024)
- Alessandra Noelle Co (2024)
- Allyana Goyenechea (2024)
- Alondra Ellyz (2024)
- Amarah Espinosa (2024)
- Felix Argus Aspiras (2024; still hosting It's Showtime)
- Arianah Kelsey Lasam (2024; still hosting It's Showtime)
- Kiara Ayesha Bajeta (2024; still hosting It's Showtime)
- Briseis Ericka Quijano (2024; still hosting It's Showtime and Mini Miss U grand finalist)
- Calvin Dream (2024)
- Chanel Mais Hammada (2024)
- Chastity Claire Dizon (2024)
- Christan Echalas (2024)
- Clave Sun (2024)
- Dani Zee (2024)
- EJ Teotico (2024)
- Elisha Ravyn Pamintuan (2024)
- Elle Sofia Masaud (2024)
- Elyse Arcilla (2024)
- Enicka Xaria Orbe (2024; still hosting It's Showtime)
- Erin Rose Espiritu (2024)
- Imogen Cantong (2024; still hosting It's Showtime)
- James Clarence Fajardo (2024)
- Jaze Capili (2024; still hosting It's Showtime)
- Jeremiah Cruz (2024)
- Kendall Rhiel & Kylie Gabrielle Samson (2024)
- Lucas Andalio (2024)
- Ludwig Van Go (2024)
- Mary Hall (2024)
- Miguel Casimiro (2024; current cast of Someone, Someday)
- Miho Kobayashi (2024)
- Misha Meiko Kobayashi (2024)
- Nathaniel Scott (2024)
- Princess Kathrine "Kulot" Caponpon (2024; still hosting It's Showtime)
- Rifa Amatonding (2024; later joined Idol Kids Philippines)
- Scarlet Cariño (2024)
- Sean John Bialoglovski (2024)
- Sean Rhys Stevens (2024)
- Sebreenika Santos (2024)
- Selena Ocampo (2024)
- Sheerina Tanciatco (2024)
- Stanley Sarmiento (2024)
- Stephanie De Groot (2024)
- Stephen Paul Rustia (2024)
- Tyron Alferez (2024)
- Valerie Talion (2024)
- Wardell Dizon (2024)
- Zarniah Fae Abocado (2024)
- Zoe Ysabelle Cabudoc (2024)

== Former cast ==
=== The "Graduates" ===
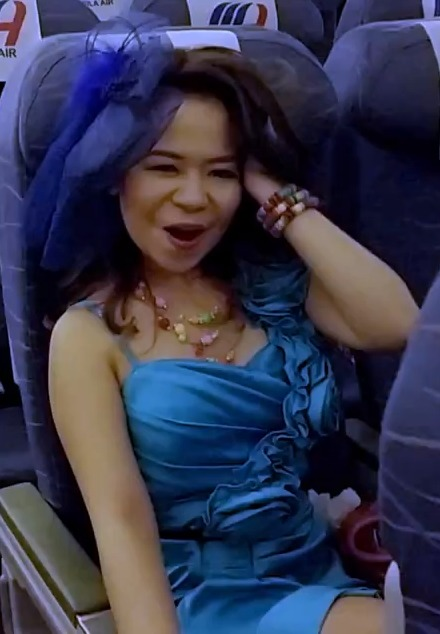
Kiray Celis, third batch graduate.

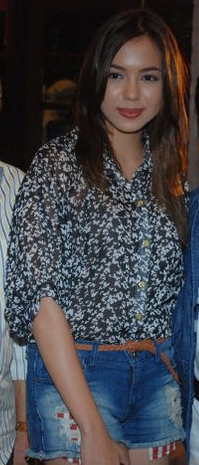
Julia Montes, fourth batch graduate.

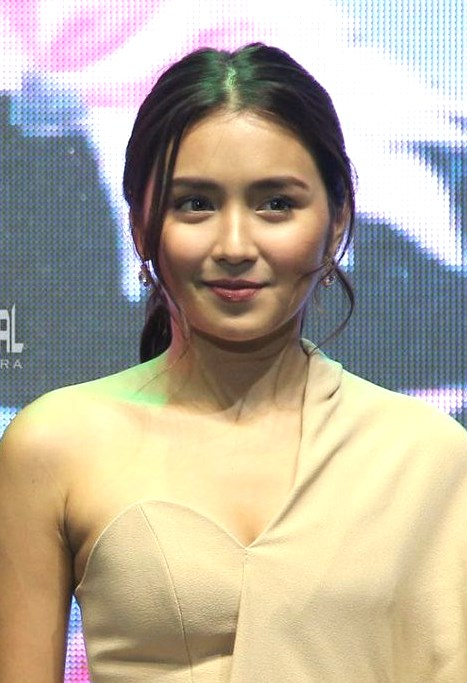
Kathryn Bernardo, fifth batch graduate.

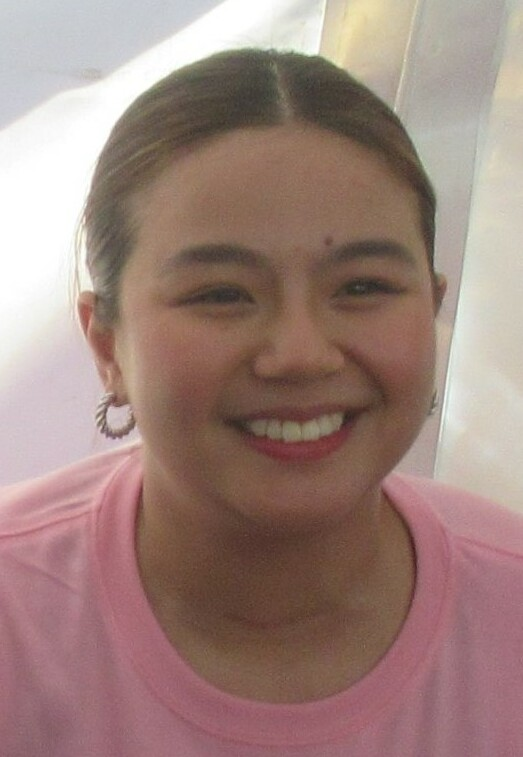
Miles Ocampo, sixth batch graduate.

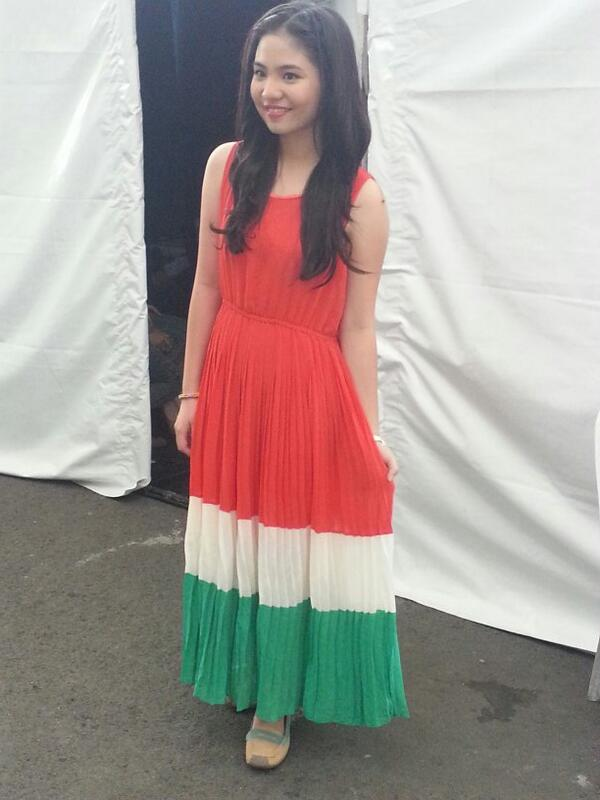
Sharlene San Pedro, seventh batch graduate.

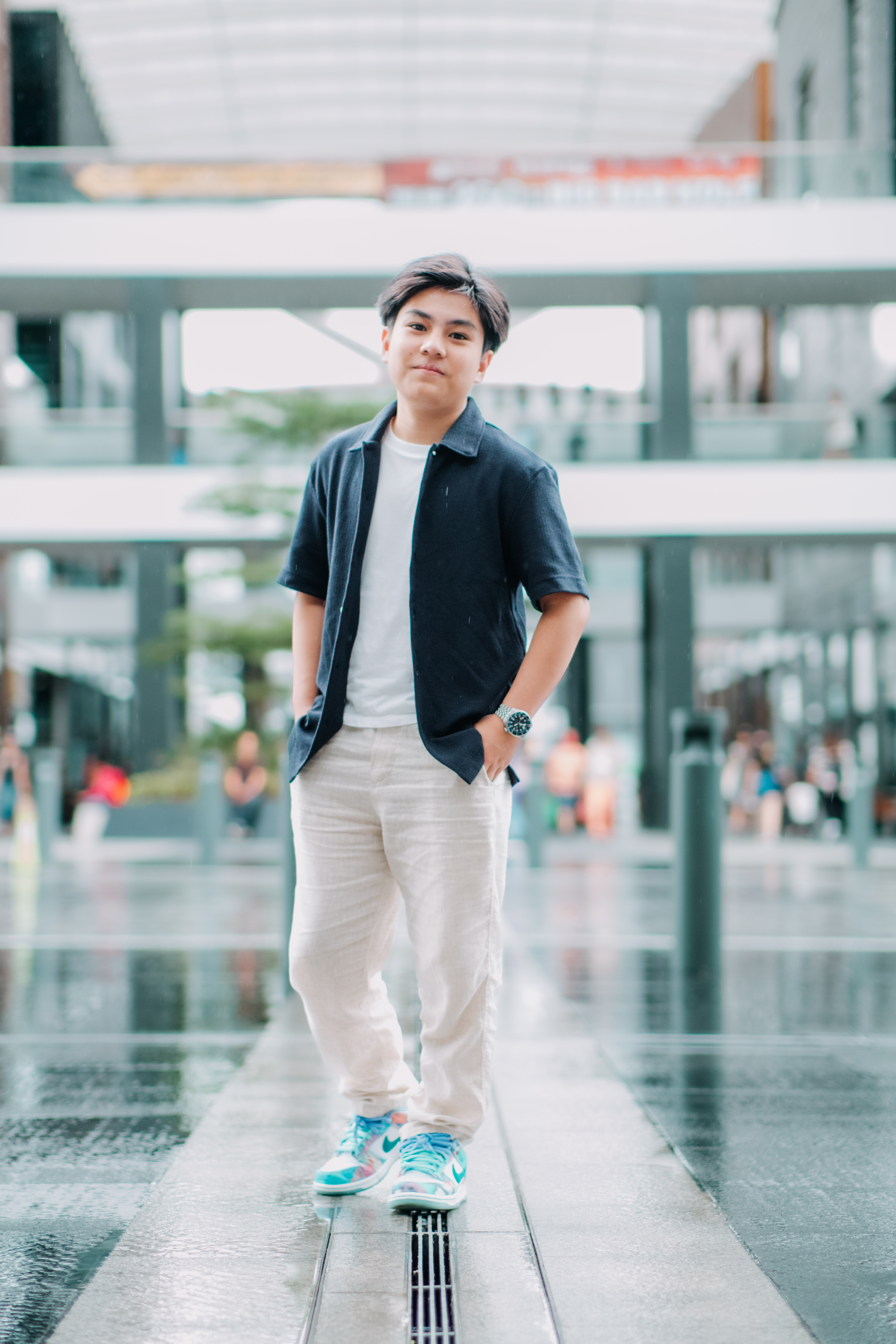
Izzy Canillo, twelfth batch graduate.

The following are the graduates who left the show after they graduated, or they simply graduated:

==== First batch (March 5, 2006) ====
- Alfred Labatos (2005–06)
- EJ Jallorina (2005–06)
- May Florence Blanche (2005 - 2015)

==== Second batch (February 11, 2007) ====
- Carl John Barrameda (2005–07)

==== Third batch (June 17, 2007) ====
- Kiray Celis (2005–07)
- Kristel Fulgar (2005–07) - did not appear due to taping schedules for Maria Flordeluna
- Trina "Hopia" Legaspi (2005–07)
- Eliza Pineda (2005–07) - did not appear due to taping schedules for Maria Flordeluna

==== Fourth batch (March 2, 2008) ====
- John Manalo (2005–08)
- Julia Montes (2005–08)

==== Fifth batch (October 19, 2008) ====
- Kathryn Bernardo (2006–08)
- Steven Christian Fermo (2005–08)
- CJ Navato (2005–08)
- Jane Oineza (2005–08)
- Mikylla Ramirez (2005–08)

==== Sixth batch (October 25, 2009) ====
- Nikki Bagaporo (2005–09)
- Yong An Chiu (2005–09)
- Igi Boy Flores (2005–09)
- Miles Ocampo (2005–09)

==== Seventh batch (September 18, 2011) ====
- Nash Aguas (2005–11)
- Aaliyah Benisano (2007–11)
- Mika dela Cruz (2007–11)
- Noemi Oineza (2008–11)
- Sharlene San Pedro (2005–11)

==== Eighth batch (February 24, 2013) ====
- Joseph Andre Garcia (2008–13)
- Alexa Ilacad (2008–13)
- Aaron Junatas (2005; 2007–13)
- Angel Sy (2005–13)
- Kobi Vidanes (2005–13)

==== Ninth batch (March 23, 2014) ====
- Angelo Garcia (2009–14)
- Barbie Sabino (2008-14)

==== Tenth batch (August 30, 2015) ====
- Carl Camo (2008–15)
- Miguelito de Guzman (2009–15)
- Belle Mariano (2012–15)

==== Eleventh batch (February 28, 2016) ====
- Harvey Bautista (2011-16)
- Bugoy Cariño (2009–16)
- Brenna Garcia (2011–16)
- Casey da Silva (2011-16)

==== Twelfth batch (April 2, 2017) ====
- Izzy Canillo (2011–17)

==== Thirteenth batch (February 25, 2018) ====
- Bea Basa (2011–18)
- Clarence Delgado (2011–18)
- Mitch Naco (2014–18)

==== Fourteenth batch (March 10, 2019) ====
- Allyson McBride (2013–19)
- JB Agustin (2013–19)
- Mutya Orquia (2012–19)

=== Other former casts ===
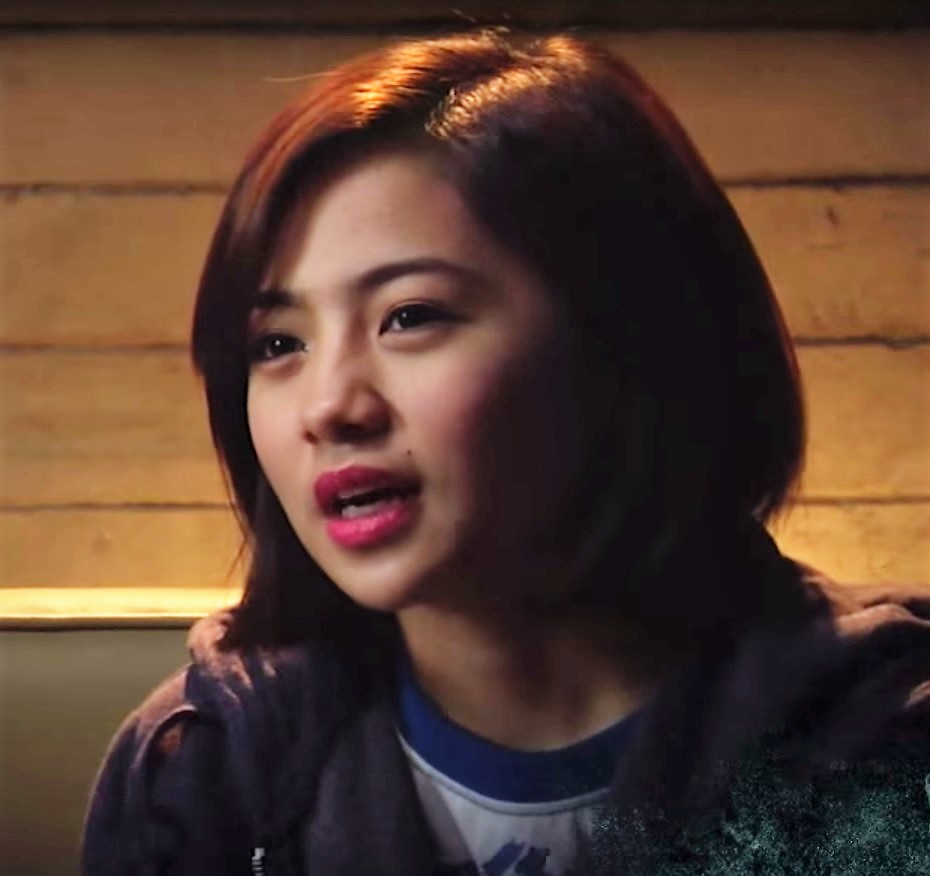
Ella Cruz, former cast member.

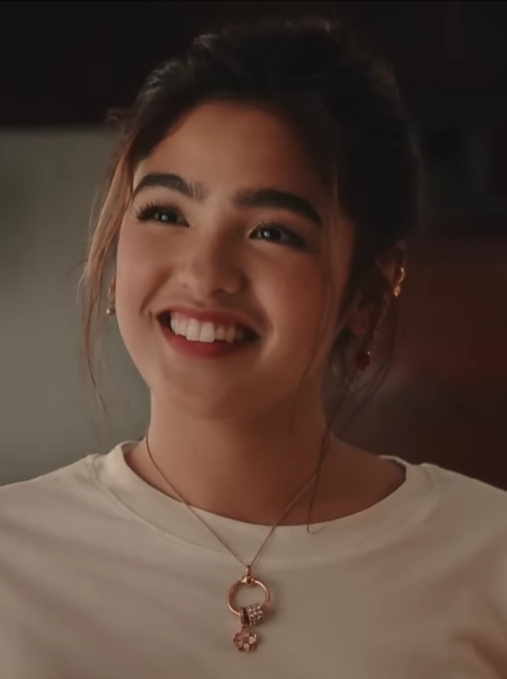
Andrea Brillantes, former cast member.

The following are the other former cast members who left the show before they graduated, or they simply did not graduate:

- Jana Agoncillo (2016–17)
- Jillian Aguila (2013–14)
- Basty Alcances (2005–10)
- Sophia Baars (2006–09)
- Aaliyah Belmoro (2013–14)
- Joshen Bernardo (2011–13)
- Andrea Brillantes (2011–13)
- Cha-Cha Cañete (2008–14)
- Timothy Chan (2008–10)
- Cyruss Co (2006–07)
- Ella Cruz (2007–09)
- Zaijian Jaranilla (2008–09)
- Eunice Lagusad (2007–08)
- Daniella Lucas (2014)
- Lance Lucido (2013–15)
- Sofia Millares (2011–13)
- Kriztenne Mizuno (2007)
- Alonzo Muhlach (2015)
- Aldred Nasayao (2013–14)
- Amy Nobleza (2008–09)
- Phillip Nolasco (2008–10)
- Princess Ortiz (2012–13)
- Julijo Pisk (2007–08)
- Kazumi Porquez (2013–19)
- Nathan Prats (2016–17)
- Heart Ramos (2017–19)
- Sophia Reola (2015–19)
- Queennie Sulit (2011)
- Joshua Tecson (2006–10)
- Angelique Velez (2007–08)
- JJ Zamora (2007–08)

=== Final cast of the first incarnation ===
- Romeo "Dagul" Pastrana (2005–19)
- CX Navarro (2013–19)
- Ashley Sarmiento (2013–19)
- Raikko Mateo (2014–19)
- John Steven "Josh" de Guzman (2014–19)
- Vito Quizon (2015–19)
- Lilygem Yulores (2015–19)
- Chunsa Angela Jung (2015–19)
- Cessa Moncera (2015–19)
- Marc Santiago (2015–19)
- Marco Masa (2016–19)
- Justin James Quilantang (2017–19)
- Angelika Rama (2017–19)
- Khevynne Arias (2018–19)
- Yñigo Delen (2019)
- Jordan Lim (2019)
- Carlo Mendoza (2019)
- Freya Montierra (2019)

=== Bulilits that auditioned but failed ===
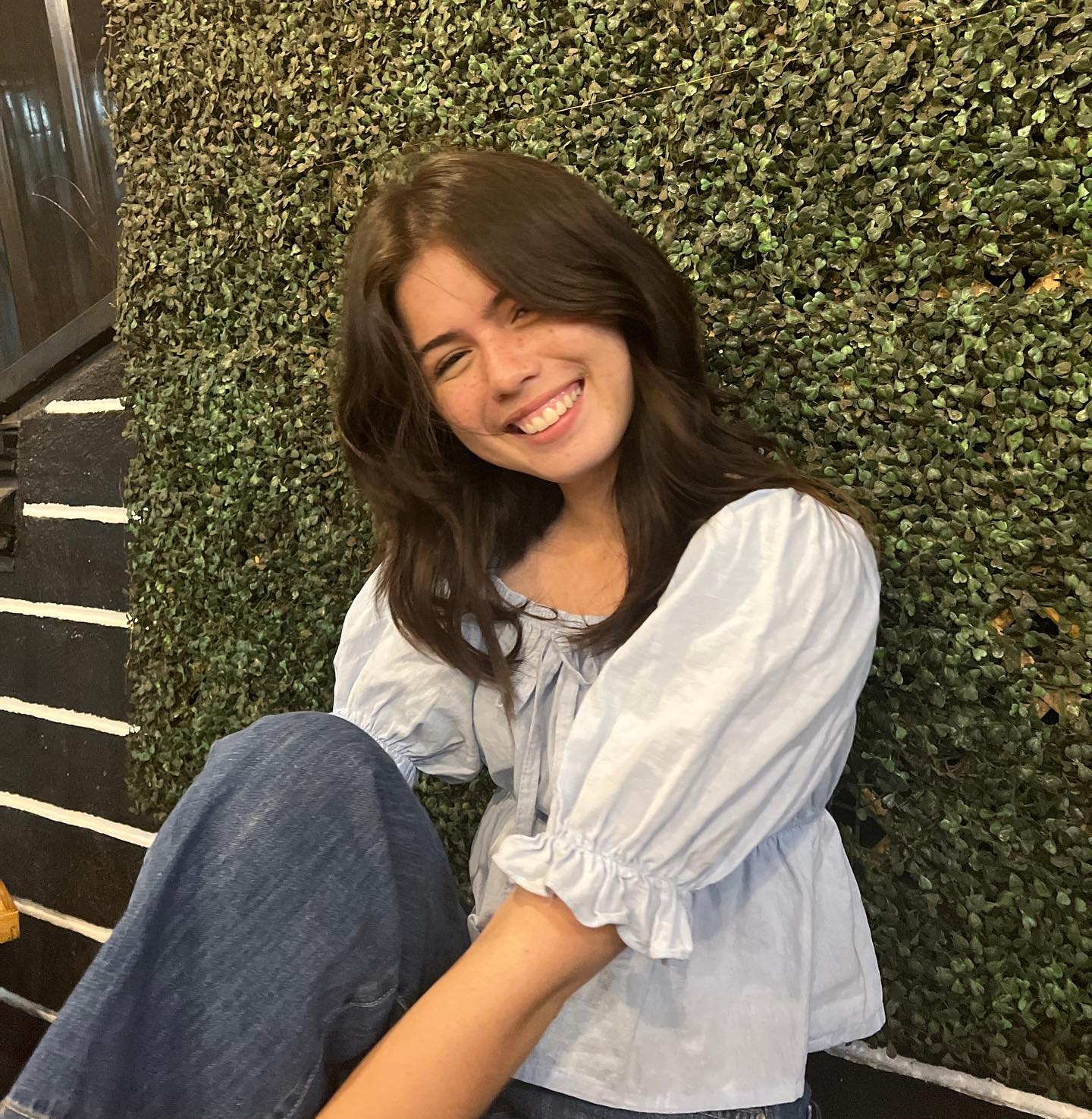
Lauren King auditioned for the show in 2013.

- Makisig Morales
- Lauren King (auditioned in 2013)
- Chloe Gwen Jones (auditioned in 2019)
- Zia Grace Bataan
- Rumi Nakamura
- Zane Anthony Tudla
- Janell Gonzaga
- Tracey Mae Custodio
- Krystal Mejes

== Guests ==
=== Guest bulilits ===
The following are kids or "bulilits" who have had guest appearance/s in the show at one time:

- Louise Abuel
- Jan Micheal Patricio Andres
- Jairus Aquino
- Kim Belles
- Robinson Guanzon Jr.
- Louise Bernardo
- Tonton Cabilles
- Nhikzy Calma
- Yesha Camile
- Althea Guanzon
- Jhoakim Canindo
- Francis Concepcion
- Brandon Cordero
- Karla Cruz
- Miguel Diokno
- Mackie Empuerto
- Miguel Enrile
- Lyca Gairanod
- Owie Boy Gapuz
- Lordy Girado
- JM Ibañez
- Micko Laurente
- Nicoli Lista
- Jake Llamas
- Klyne Lopez
- Jon Michael
- Rolando Ng
- Aimi Nishida
- Jesse Ongteco
- Kenshin Pioquinto
- Dentrix Ponce
- Ryan Christian Santos Recto
- Fae Roguel
- Keifer Sanchez
- Rhianna Santiago
- Athalia See
- Bob Seun
- Miguel Vergara
- Jennie dela Cruz
- Darlene Vibares
- Robert Villar

=== Other guests ===
The following is an incomplete list of teens and adults who had guest appearance/s in the show:

- Jamie Rivera
- Piolo Pascual
- Jolina Magdangal
- Toni Gonzaga
- Jericho Rosales
- Julia Barretto
- Dolphy
- Belle Mariano - also part of Goin' Bulilit from 2012—2015.
- Vilma Santos
- Kim Atienza
- Empoy Marquez - became a guest in 2018.
- John Lloyd Cruz
- Bea Alonzo
- Kim Chiu
- Maja Salvador
- Angelica Panganiban
- Gerald Anderson
- Sofia Andres
- Xian Lim
- Nikki Bagaporo - also part of Goin' Bulilit.
- Alexa Ilacad - also part of Goin' Bulilit.
- Zanjoe Marudo - became a guest in 2018.
- Kathryn Bernardo - also part of Goin' Bulilit from 2006—2008.
- Julia Montes - also part of Goin' Bulilit from 2005—2008.
- Igi Boy Flores - also part of Goin' Bulilit from 2005—2009.
- Miles Ocampo - also part of Goin' Bulilit from 2005—2009.
- Nash Aguas - also part of Goin' Bulilit from 2005—2011.
- Sharlene San Pedro - also part of Goin' Bulilit from 2005—2011.
- Mika dela Cruz - also part of Goin' Bulilit from 2006—2011.
- Daniel Padilla
- Angeline Quinto
- Janella Salvador
- Yen Santos
- Enrique Gil
- Joshua Garcia
- Maymay Entrata
- Liza Soberano
- Edward Barber
- Kaori Oinuma
- Karina Bautista
- Jelay Pilones
- Jopet Cruz
- Nelson Evangelista - also in adults in 2024.
- Jiro Manio - also in adults in 2024.
- Kristel Fulgar - also part of Goin' Bulilit from 2005—2007.
- John Arcilla - played the role "Heneral Luna".

== See also ==
- Goin' Bulilit
- Team Yey!
- Goin' Bananas
- Banana Sundae
- Sunday 'Kada
