= Luv Text =

Philippine romantic comedy film

- Directed by: Rowell Santiago
- Screenplay by: Raquel Villavicencio; Ricardo Lee
- Produced by: Eric Cuatico
- Starring: Judy Ann Santos; Wowie de Guzman
- Cinematography: Ely Cruz
- Edited by: Tara Illenberger
- Music by: Louie Ocampo
- Production company: Maverick Films
- Distributed by: GMA Films
- Release date: June 20, 2001
- Running time: 104 minutes
- Country: Philippines
- Language: Filipino

Luv Text is a 2001 Philippine romantic comedy film directed by Rowell Santiago. The film stars Judy Ann Santos and Wowie de Guzman. This is the first film produced by Maverick Films after being acquired by a group of investors when it was called Millennium Cinema.

== Cast ==
- Judy Ann Santos as Melissa
- Nida Blanca as Cielito
  - Karen Navarrete as Young Cielito
- Wowie de Guzman as Banjo
- Carlo Muñoz as Pablo
- Joonee Gamboa as Nanding
  - Luis Alandy as Young Nanding
- Wilma Doesnt as Ebony
- Russell C. Mon as Ivan
- Mel Kimura as Ms. Asuncion
- Manuel Aquino as Debate Class Professor
- Jenny Rances as Tricia
- Iyan Adewuya as Angel
- Gloria Tenchavez as Soling
- Rowell Santiago as Ryan
