= Lab en Kisses =

Philippine romantic comedy film

- Directed by: Tony Y. Reyes
- Written by: Tony Y. Reyes
- Produced by: Orly Illacad; Vic Sotto
- Starring: Vic Sotto; Vina Morales
- Cinematography: Atoy de Vera
- Edited by: Eduardo Jarlego Jr.
- Music by: Jaime Fabregas
- Production companies: OctoArts Films; Cinemax Studios; APT Entertainment; M-Zet Productions
- Distributed by: OctoArts Films
- Release date: September 11, 1996
- Running time: 110 minutes
- Country: Philippines
- Language: Filipino

Lab en Kisses is a 1996 Philippine romantic comedy film written and directed by Tony Y. Reyes. The film stars Vic Sotto and Vina Morales in their respective title roles. It is a pun on the phrase Love and Kisses.

== Plot ==
Lab owns a car mechanic shop and is assisted by Popoy. A known woman-hater, Lab resists the advances of next-door neighbor Maria who has a long-time crush on him. Trouble arises when Popoy's brother-in-law Dodong arrives from Cebu bringing along his boss' niece named Kisses. Both Dodong and Kisses escaped from Cebu to avoid an arranged marriage facilitated by Kisses' uncle John with his business associate Mickey. Since Popoy knows that Lab does not like women living in his house, he suggests that Kisses cut her hair and dress up as a man so that she and Dodong can be allowed to live as boarders.

Lab was initially hesitant to admit Dodong and a disguised Kisses (who went by the name Kiko) to his household because of dire economic conditions. But later on he relented when the two agreed to volunteer to work at his shop in exchange for food and shelter in addition to a meager salary. As days went by, Lab and Kiko/Kisses grew closer together as they shared things in common. But Kiko/Kisses accidentally left her underwear in the bathroom that inadvertently revealed her gender to Lab, which resulted in her eviction from the household along with Dodong. However, after she revealed to Lab that they ran away from Cebu due to threats to her and Dodong's lives, they were accepted back. Life was supposedly peaceful for Lab, Kisses, Dodong and Popoy again. However Mickey and his henchmen Badong and Aga came to Manila and were able to retrieve Kisses and Dodong from Lab. This lead Lab to use up his remaining savings to travel to Cebu along with Popoy to prevent Kisses' marriage from Mickey. After Lab and Popoy successfully stopped the supposed wedding with the help of Dodong, Uncle John had Mickey and his men arrested after he found out the real reason behind the forced arranged marriage. After Kisses forgave Uncle John for his shortcomings, the wedding was continued but this time, with Lab taking over Mickey's place as the groom.

== Cast ==
- Vic Sotto as Lab
- Vina Morales as Kisses
- Larry Silva as Popoy
- Yoyong Martirez as Dodong
- Rez Cortez as Mickey
- Jaime Fabregas as Uncle John
- Don Pepot as Amboy
- Richard Merck as Badong
- Romy Diaz as Aga
- Beth Tamayo as Maria
- Janus del Prado as Kaloy
- Agatha Tapan as Kikay
- Alwyn Uytingco as Kokoy
- Vangie Labalan as Inday
- Maning Bato as Maning
- Danny Labra as Marlon
