= Asia Agcaoili =

Filipina media personality (born 1977)

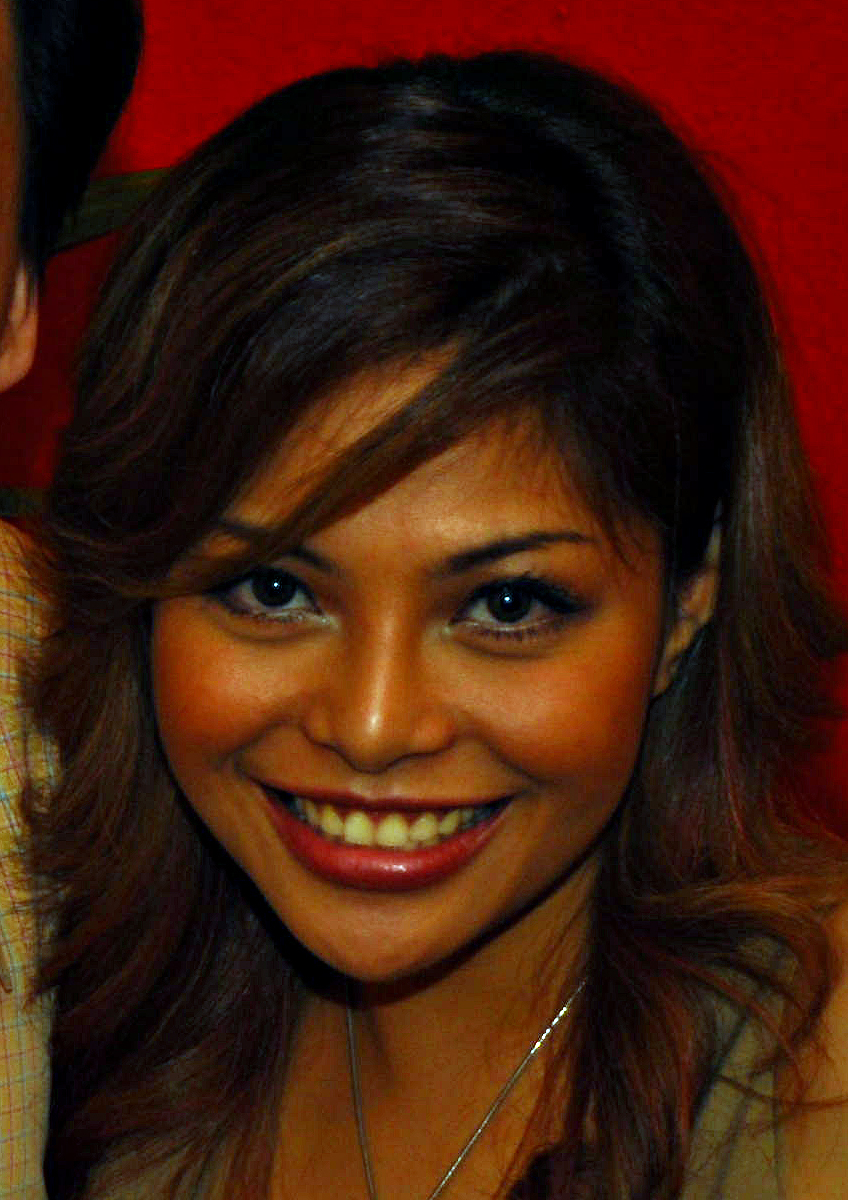
- Asia Agcaoili in 2006
- Born: Junelyn Alexis Unana Agcaoili; September 20, 1977 (age 49); Philippines
- Education: University of the Philippines Diliman (BS); University of Amsterdam
- Occupations: Television presenter; recording artist; dancer; model; actress; columnist
- Years active: 2000–2009
- Spouse: Bram van der Kolk (m. 2009)
- Children: 1
- Musical career
- Genres: Pinoy pop; dance-pop
- Instruments: Vocals
- Years active: 2004–2008
- Label: Viva Records
- Formerly of: Viva Hot Babes

Junelyn Alexis "Asia" Unana Agcaoili (Tagalog pronunciation: [aɡkɐˈwilɪ]; born September 20, 1977) is a Filipina television and radio host, actress, recording artist, dancer, model, and former columnist. She was a member of the Viva Hot Babes girl group. Agcaoili presented the reality show Pinoy Big Brother on Studio 23 (2005–07), the basketball show iPBA (2006–07) on ABC, and the singing competition IKON Philippines (2007) on RPN. As an actress, she portrayed Roxanne in the ABS-CBN drama series 'Til Death Do Us Part (2007).

Agcaoili is dubbed as a sex guru, having discussed sex and sexuality on her FHM Philippines column, direct-to-video releases, and other platforms.

== Entertainment career ==
Agcaoili was already a model when she joined the ABC reality show SINGLE in 2002. In four episodes, she bested the two other contestants to become the "Single Girl". The show subsequently featured her for 13 episodes.

In 2003, she joined the second batch of the Viva Hot Babes, a girl group known for double entendre lyrics, sensual performances, as well as appearances in men's magazines and films. The group released three EPs before disbanding in 2008. With her fellow Hot Babes, Agcaoili appeared in the film First Time (2003) and then starred in the sexually-informative direct-to-video films Sex Guru (2004) and Erotica: Lessons of the Flesh (2005).

In March 2004, Agcaoili was suspended for 20 days by ABS-CBN after her left breast was exposed during a Viva Hot Babes dance performance for the live variety show MTB. She explained that the incident was unintentional. In July that year, she appeared on the cover of FHM Philippines and became the magazine's sex columnist, writing monthly until 2009. She also appeared several times on the magazine's 100 Sexiest Women list, with her highest rank being 13th place in 2005 and 2006.

In ABS-CBN, Agcaoili appeared in the teleseryes Basta't Kasama Kita (2003–04) and 'Til Death Do Us Part (2005). As a television presenter, she hosted the Pinoy Big Brother broadcast on Studio 23 (Pinoy Big Brother: Si Kuya, KaBarkada Mo). On ABC, she hosted iPBA (2006–07), the recap and analysis show of the Philippine Basketball Association (PBA). She then hosted the singing competition IKON Philippines (2007) on RPN.

In radio, she was a disc jockey on the radio station Magic 89.9 until January 14, 2007.

Her first television appearance in New Zealand was in a 2020 COVID-19 public service announcement.

== Personal life ==
Agcaoili graduated from the University of the Philippines Diliman with a bachelor's degree in clothing technology.

She moved to Amsterdam, Netherlands in 2007 to join her boyfriend, Dutch computer programmer Bram van der Kolk. She gave birth to their son, Xander, in April 2009. The couple then married on September 9 that year. During her time in the Netherlands, she took Dutch integration courses at the University of Amsterdam. She also met with the self-exiled communist leader Jose Maria Sison.

Agcaoili, along with her husband and son, later moved to Auckland, New Zealand. There, Van der Kolk worked as the chief programmer of Megaupload. He, along with his colleagues, were charged with copyright infringement, racketeering, and money laundering when the company was shut down in 2012. When the company was re-launched as Mega in 2013, Van der Kolk was retained as chief programmer while Agcaoili became a shareholder.

She is bisexual.

== Filmography ==
=== Film ===
Year	Title	Role	Notes
2003	First Time	Tina	
2004	Sex Guru	Herself	Direct-to-video
2005	Erotica: Lessons of the Flesh	Herself	Direct-to-video
2007	Bedtime Stories	Herself	Direct-to-video
2007	Casa		

=== Television ===
Year	Title	Role	Notes
2002	SINGLE	Herself (contestant)	
2003	Extra Challenge	Herself (contestant)	
2003–2004	Basta't Kasama Kita	Rhowena Aroanah/Macaraeg	Extended cast
2004	MTB Ang Saya Saya	Herself	
2005	'Til Death Do Us Part	Roxanne	
2005–2007	Pinoy Big Brother	Herself (host)	
2006	Magpakailanman	Herself	Episode: "Nang Minsang Magtanong ang Puso" (The Asia Agcaoili Story)
2006–2007	iPBA	Herself (host)	
2007	IKON Philippines	Herself (host)	
2007	Pilipinas, Game Ka Na Ba?	Herself (contestant)	1 episode
2008	Kung Fu Kids	Sheila	Supporting cast
