= Jinggoy Estrada =

Senator of the Philippines since 2022 and actor (born 1963)

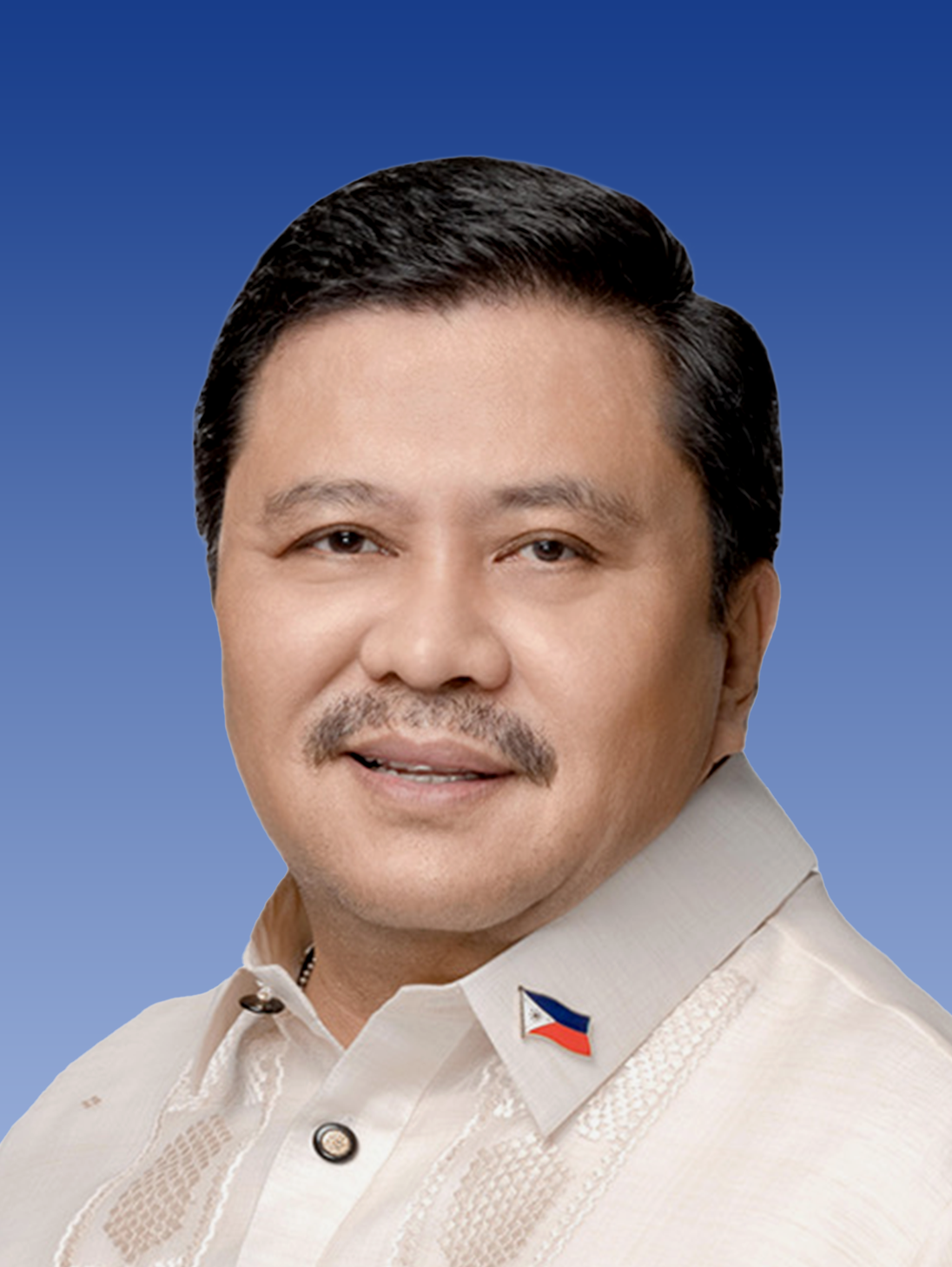
- Portrait of Estrada as member of the Philippine Commission on Appointments

President of the Senate of the Philippines
- Acting
- In office June 5, 2013 – July 22, 2013
- Preceded by: Juan Ponce Enrile
- Succeeded by: Franklin Drilon

Senator of the Philippines
- Incumbent
- Assumed office June 30, 2022 (Note: Suspended since June 16, 2026.)
- In office June 30, 2004 – June 30, 2016

President pro tempore of the Senate of the Philippines
- In office May 20, 2024 – September 8, 2025
- Preceded by: Loren Legarda
- Succeeded by: Ping Lacson
- In office July 23, 2007 – June 30, 2013
- Preceded by: Juan Flavier
- Succeeded by: Ralph Recto

16th Mayor of San Juan
- In office June 30, 1992 – June 30, 2001
- Vice Mayor: Philip Cezar
- Preceded by: Adolfo Sto. Domingo
- Succeeded by: Philip Cezar (acting); JV Ejercito

Vice Mayor of San Juan, Metro Manila
- In office June 30, 1988 – June 30, 1992
- Mayor: Adolfo Sto. Domingo
- Preceded by: Ernesto Guingona (OIC)
- Succeeded by: Philip Cezar

Personal details
- Born: Jose Pimentel Ejercito Jr. February 17, 1963 (age 63) Manila, Philippines
- Party: PMP (since 1991)
- Other political affiliations: UNA (2012–2015); NPC (1992–2001); Liberal (1987–1991)
- Spouse: Ma. Presentacion Vitug (m. 1989)
- Children: 4, including Julian
- Parents: Joseph Estrada (father); Loi Ejercito (mother)
- Relatives: Ejercito family
- Education: University of the Philippines Manila (AB); Lyceum of the Philippines University (LL.B)
- Occupation: Actor; film producer; politician
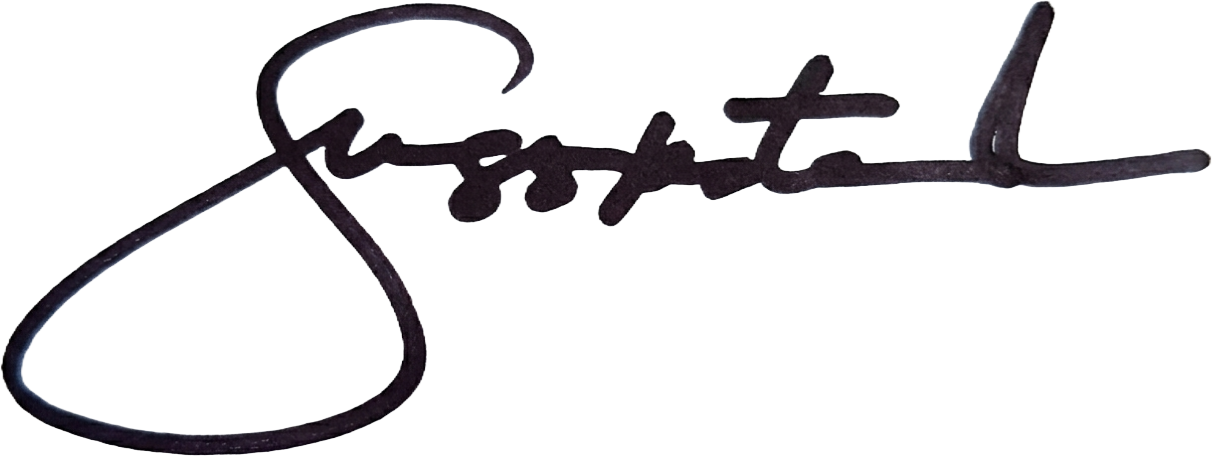
- Signature
- Website: jinggoyestrada.ph
- Nickname: "Jingle Bells"

YouTube information
- Channel: Jinggoy Estrada Official
- Years active: 2020–present
- Genres: Politics; Vlogs; Game show
- Subscribers: 90.3 thousand
- Views: 5,547,775
- Last updated: August 1, 2026
- Criminal information
- Status: Incarcerated
- Convictions: Pork barrel scam: Direct bribery under Section 210 of the Revised Penal Code; Indirect bribery under Section 211 of Revised Penal Code (2 counts)
- Criminal charges: Flood control scandal: Plunder; Graft (2 counts)
- Penalty: Pork barrel scam: 8–9 years and 4 months of imprisonment (for direct bribery); 2 years and 4 months–3 years, 6 months and 20 days of imprisonment (for indirect bribery); Fine of ₱3 million; Suspension from holding public office and temporary disqualification from exercising the right to vote

Details
- Date apprehended: Pork barrel scam: June 23, 2014; Flood control scandal: May 29, 2026 (Graft); June 1, 2026 (Plunder)
- Imprisoned at: Quezon City Jail

Jose Pimentel Ejercito Jr. (born February 17, 1963), better known as Jinggoy Estrada or Jinggoy Ejercito Estrada, is a Filipino politician and actor serving as a senator since 2022 and previously from 2004 to 2016. He served as president pro tempore of the Senate from 2007 to 2013 and again from 2024 to 2025. He also briefly became the acting Senate President in 2013 after Juan Ponce Enrile's resignation. Before serving in the Senate, he was the vice mayor (1988–1992) and later mayor (1992–2001) of San Juan when it was still a municipality.

Estrada has been detained on multiple occasions in connection with corruption cases. In April 2001, he and his father, former president Joseph Estrada, were arrested and charged with plunder following the Second EDSA Revolution. He was released in 2003 and acquitted in 2007. In 2014, he was arrested and detained over the pork barrel scam, where he was accused of receiving ₱183 million in kickbacks. Although acquitted of plunder in 2024, he was initially convicted of bribery before the Sandiganbayan reversed the conviction later that year. In 2026, Estrada was charged with plunder, bribery, and graft over alleged kickbacks from ₱1.4 billion worth of flood control projects in Bulacan. After posting bail on the graft charges, he was arrested on June 1, 2026 on a non-bailable plunder charge and detained at the Quezon City Jail in Payatas. He was placed under a 90-day suspension by the Sandiganbayan on 16 June 2026.

Outside politics, Estrada, like his father, is also an actor who has starred in numerous action films. He won the Best Actor Award in the 2007 Metro Manila Film Festival for the film Katas ng Saudi.

== Early life and education ==
Estrada was born on February 17, 1963, in Manila to actor Joseph Estrada and physician Luisa Pimentel Ejercito. Beginning in his childhood, he migrated to the United States with his mother and siblings after his parents separated for 18 years following his father's extramarital affair with Guia Gomez in the 1960s.

Estrada finished his primary and secondary education at the Ateneo de Manila University and earned a degree in A.B. Economics from the University of the Philippines Manila. He took up Bachelor of Laws for four years at the Lyceum of the Philippines University while serving as vice mayor of the then Municipality of San Juan at the age of 25. He was also bestowed an honorary Doctorate in Humanities in 2007 by the Laguna State Polytechnic University.

== Political career ==
=== Vice mayor of San Juan (1988–1992) ===
In 1988, Estrada became the vice mayor of then municipality of San Juan. He was 25 and a member of the Liberal Party at the start of his term.

=== Mayor of San Juan (1992–2001) ===
In 1992, Estrada became the youngest ever elected-local chief executive during the 1992 Philippine local elections at age 29. During his three consecutive terms as mayor, he spearheaded the construction of modernized barangay halls with daycare centers and various recreational areas such as gymnasiums, basketball courts and playgrounds. The renovation and repair of the San Juan National High School and other public elementary schools also took place, as well as the improvement and replacement of drainages, concreting of municipal roads, and the construction of the four-storey San Juan Medical Center and the San Juan Municipal Gymnasium. During his incumbency, San Juan gained the reputation of being one of the most progressive municipalities and the "most peaceful municipality in the Philippines".

During his final tenure as mayor, he was sworn into office as the national president of the League of Municipalities of the Philippines (LMP) from 1998 to 2001.

==== Arrest and detainment ====
President Joseph Estrada and incumbent San Juan Mayor Jinggoy Estrada were the first elected officials to be charged with plunder under the Philippine Anti-Plunder Law. On April 25, 2001, Estrada was arrested alongside his father, former president Joseph Estrada, at their home in North Greenhills Village in Greenhills, San Juan over charges of plunder by the Sandiganbayan, upon which they were transported to separate prison cells in Camp Crame. Vice Mayor Philip Cezar succeeded Estrada as acting mayor of San Juan, while Estrada's half-brother JV Ejercito won the town's mayoral election in May and became mayor on June 30, 2001.

At the height of pro-Joseph Estrada protests in EDSA III, Jinggoy and his wife Precy Vitug-Ejercito were flown via helicopter to Fort Santo Domingo in Santa Rosa, Laguna under heavy security on May 1, 2001; his father was simultaneously brought to the fort in a separate helicopter, and placed in a two-bedroom detention cell with Jinggoy. By May 12, the two were transferred to the Veterans Memorial Medical Center (VMMC) in Quezon City after they complained of chills and fevers, with Jinggoy also noting his chest pain. On June 18, 2001, Jinggoy was granted temporary liberty from June 19 to 23 for him to remove his belongings at the mayor's office in San Juan.

In December 2001, cardiologist Roberto Anastacio deemed Estrada to be suffering from heart problems caused by stress. With his heart ailments, Estrada was brought to the Makati Medical Center (MMC) at least five times during his detainment at the VMMC; his fifth visit to the MMC lasted for seven weeks (from May 17 to July 6, 2002) to recover from aspirational pneumonia, and was ordered to return by the Sandiganbayan due to a report alleging to have spotted him on June 11 attending actor Rudy Fernandez's press conference at a restaurant inside MMC. Estrada was released on bail on March 7, 2003, and visited his family at North Greenhills Village, but spent an extra night at the VMMC before leaving on March 8, 2003.

In November 5, 2007, Senator Estrada vowed to block the appointment to the Supreme Court of Sandiganbayan justices Teresita de Castro and Francisco Villaruz Jr. for convicting his father for plunder.

=== Senator of the Philippines (2004–2016) ===
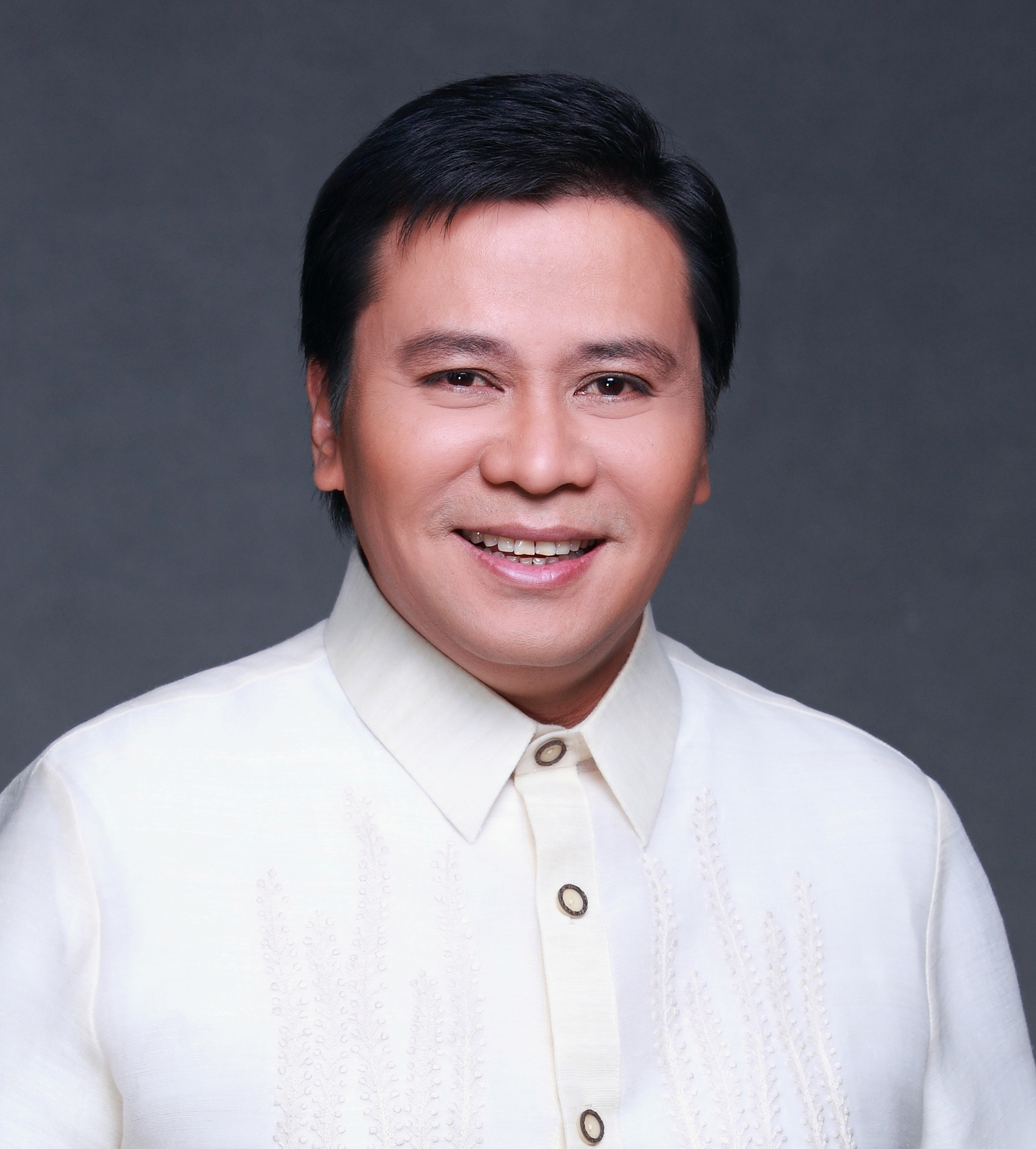
Official portrait, 2012

In 2004, Estrada was elected as a senator. During his first term, he introduced at least 617 bills and resolutions and steered the passage of at least 16 bills either as a principal sponsor or principal author. Jinggoy is hailed as the second most productive and prolific senator, next to Sen. Miriam Defensor-Santiago, who filed the most bills and resolutions in the Senate.

On July 23, 2007, Estrada was elected as Senate president pro tempore.

On August 15, 2007, the Supreme Court voted 13–0 to uphold the Sandiganbayan's decision to grant his bail in connection with his plunder case before the graft court. His father, former president Joseph Estrada, was the main accused in that plunder case and was subsequently convicted but was immediately pardoned by then-President Gloria Macapagal Arroyo. Jinggoy, on the other hand, was acquitted in the plunder charge. On September 11, 2007, he introduced Senate Bill No. 1556, proposing to make ROTC mandatory for all college students.

In 2010, he was re-elected as a senator, finishing in 2nd place. During the opening of the 15th Congress on July 26, 2010, he was re-elected as Senate president pro tempore.

During his stint in the Senate, he had been consistently hailed as one of the very few senators who scored perfect attendance, with no absence or late arrival during the chamber's plenary sessions.

==== Batas Kasambahay ====
Estrada is the principal author of the Kasambahay Law, or the law promoting the interests and welfare of the domestic workers in the Philippines. Republic Act No. 10361, or simply the "Kasambahay Law", prescribed standards, privileges, and rights of domestic workers.

=== 2019 Senate campaign ===
Estrada ran again for senator in the 2019 Philippine Senate election. His half-brother, JV Ejercito, also sought a Senate reelection. During the campaign, the half-siblings had a disagreement in the idea of them running at the same time. He was named to the Hugpong ng Pagbabago senatorial slate. However, he lost, placing 15th in the final tally, while Ejercito ended up in the 13th place, just a spot outside the winning circle. After conceding defeat, he wished that Senator Nancy Binay would make it over Ejercito, with both senators vying for the last spot in the partial and unofficial count. JV Ejercito responded by telling Estrada that he placed 13th in his own hometown San Juan, telling him “It’s painful to accept that even in your own bailiwick you are unwanted".

=== Senator of the Philippines (2022–present) ===
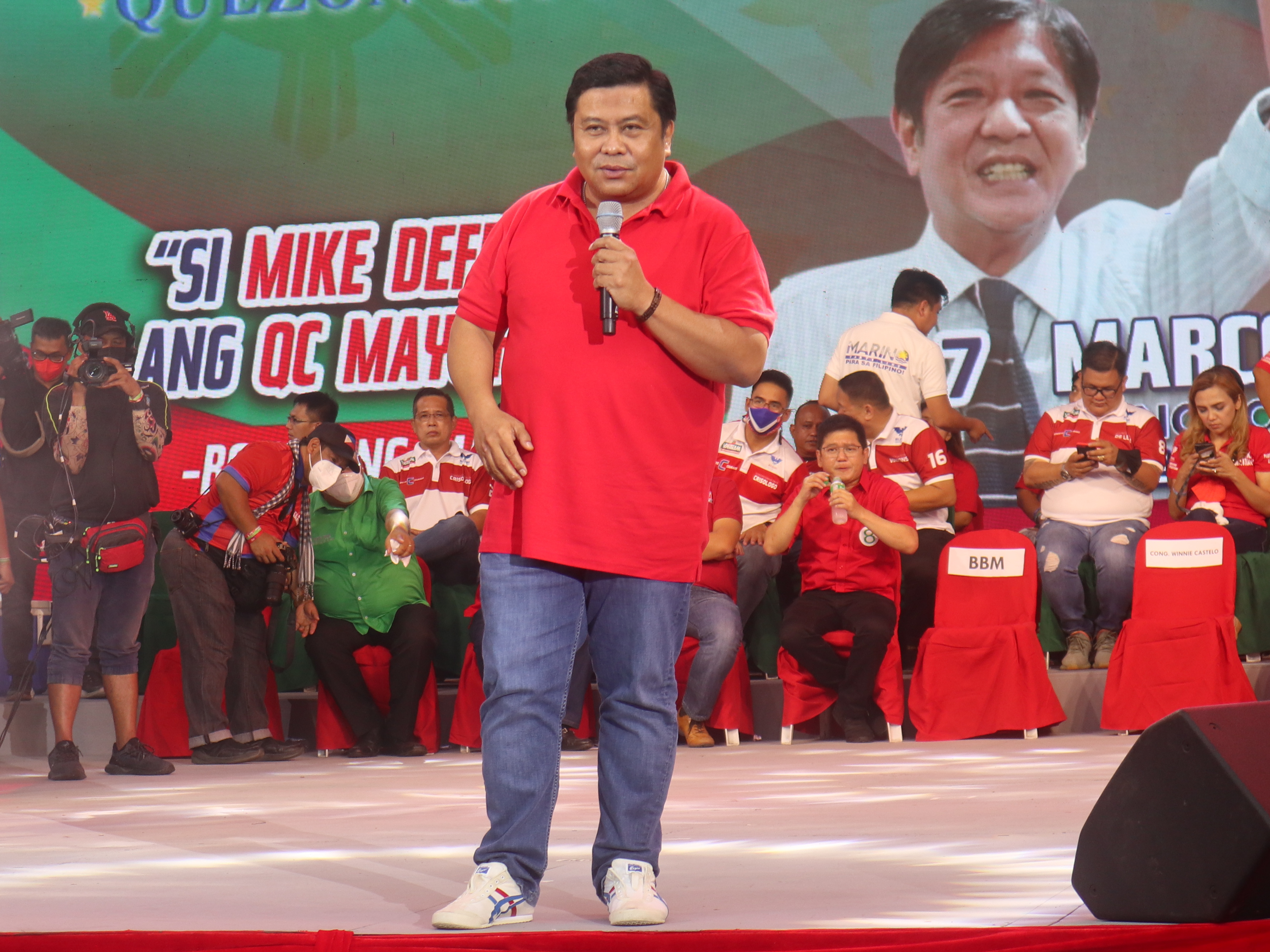
Estrada speaking at a UniTeam alliance campaign rally in Quezon City on April 13, 2022

Estrada ran once again in the 2022 Philippine Senate election. He was endorsed by Iglesia ni Cristo (INC), and was named to the senatorial slate of UniTeam alliance, openly endorsed the eventually successful candidacies of Bongbong Marcos for president and Sara Duterte for vice president. For the second straight time, his half-brother, JV Ejercito, also ran for senator on the same election. He won as the 12th placer, finally earning his third nonconsecutive term, while Ejercito was also successful as he placed 10th. Estrada chairs the Senate Committee on Labor, Employment and Human Resources Development and the Senate Committee on National Defense and Security, Peace, Unification and Reconciliation.

In October 2022, Estrada said he was thinking of a proposal to ban all Korean dramas in the Philippines, saying that "if we continue showing Korean telenovelas, our citizens praise the Koreans while Filipino artists continue losing jobs and money." Estrada clarified that he was only frustrated "that while we are only too eager and willing to celebrate South Korea's entertainment industry, we have sadly allowed our own to deteriorate because of the lack of support from the movie going public."

On January 18, 2024, Estrada was found guilty of one count of direct bribery and two counts of indirect bribery, as well as acquitted of plunder in relation to the utilization of the Priority Development Assistance Fund. He was sentenced to eight to nine years in prison for direct bribery and two to three years for indirect bribery. He was also ordered to pay a fine of ₱3 million. In addition to the criminal and civil penalties, the conviction also carries with it accessory penalties of suspension from holding public office and deprivation of right to suffrage. His legal team said that they would appeal the conviction. The Sandiganbayan in its August 22 Resolution acquitted Estrada of one count of direct bribery and two counts of indirect bribery, based on reasonable doubt.

==== Return as President Pro Tempore of the Senate (2024–2025) ====
Estrada was elected through a closed-ballot by the members of the Senate, which elected him to the position of President pro tempore of the Senate of the Philippines, a position he previously held from 2007 to 2013. Estrada was sworn-in by newly-elected President of the Senate of the Philippines Francis Escudero. On May 20, 2024, Estrada succeeded Senator Loren Legarda, who tendered her resignation. He was retained for the role in the subsequent 20th Congress. However, following Senate leadership changes on September 8, 2025, that saw Tito Sotto replace Escudero as Senate President, Estrada was replaced by Panfilo Lacson as the Senate president pro tempore and joined the minority bloc.

== Involvement in the pork barrel scam ==
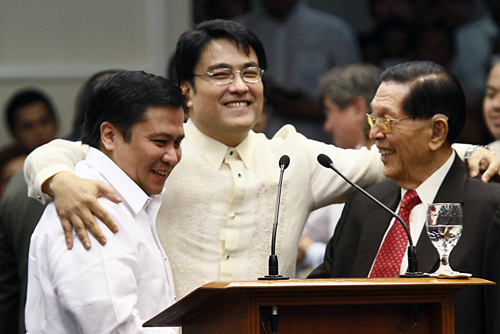
Estrada with Senators Juan Ponce Enrile and Bong Revilla after Revilla's Salamat, Kaibigan speech of June 9, 2014

In June 2014, Estrada was subject to another plunder charged at the Ombudsman, this time relating to Janet Lim-Napoles' pork barrel scam involving ₱10 billion in public funds. Two other senators—Juan Ponce Enrile and Bong Revilla—as well as more than two dozens individuals were charged with him. Estrada is accused of pocketing ₱183 million in kickbacks from fake projects.

A report by the Commission on Audit was released on August 16, 2013, showing alleged misuse of funds by lawmakers who allegedly endorsed part of their congressional allocations to bogus non-governmental organizations. The accusations were the subject of a Senate probe that began later that month.

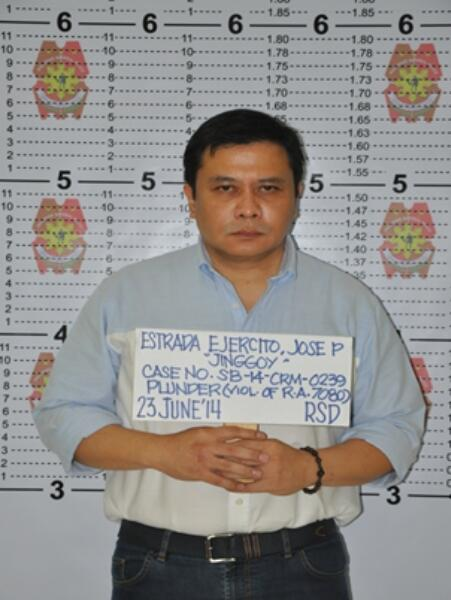
Mug shot of Jinggoy Estrada after his arrest by the Philippine National Police in 2014.

The Department of Justice filed its case against Estrada, Enrile, and Revilla before the Ombudsman on September 16, 2013.

During a Commission on Appointments' committee hearing in March 2014, Estrada stalled the appointment of Heidi Mendoza to the Commission on Audit and vowed to oppose the appointment confirmation of Justice Secretary Leila de Lima, both of whom were investigating corruption charges related to the pork barrel scam.

On June 23, 2014, Estrada was arrested and detained at the Philippine National Police Custodial Center in Camp Crame, Quezon City. In July 2014, the Sandiganbayan ordered a 90-day suspension for Estrada. Following Estrada's request to reconsider the suspension order, the Sandiganbayan upheld its decision in a ruling released in August 2014. The Senate on September 2, 2014, suspended Estrada from his position for 90 days.

On September 16, 2017, the Sandiganbayan anti-graft court released its resolution granting bail to Estrada.

On February 22, 2019, Estrada filed a request for a demurrer before the Sandiganbayan Fifth Division, asking the court to deviate from established procedure and to allow him to challenge the sufficiency of evidence midway into the trial. In March 2019, the court granted Estrada and his co-accused 10 days to file their respective demurrers; prosecution was also granted 10 days to respond.

In April 2025, the Sandiganbayan rejected Estrada's demurrer to evidence seeking to dismiss 11 graft charges against him. In October 2025, the Sandiganbayan denied Estrada's plea to dismiss his graft charges.

== Flood control projects scandal ==
In September 2025, Jinggoy Estrada is among the members of the Senate investigating massive corruption in flood control infrastructure projects in the Philippines. Estrada and fellow senator Joel Villanueva were tagged during the House of Representatives hearings into the flood control corruption controversy. In his testimony in the House, former Department of Public Works and Highways (DPWH) Bulacan 1st District engineer Brice Hernandez alleged under oath that Estrada, Villanueva, DPWH district engineer Henry Alcantara and Undersecretary Roberto Bernardo received large kickbacks in the implementation of the flood control projects. Hernandez alleged that Estrada received 30% kickbacks after channeling ₱355 million in multiple flood control projects in Malolos and Hagonoy, Bulacan.

On September 11, 2025, Senator Panfilo Lacson stated that there was an insertion into the national budget worth ₱355 million. The amount, Lacson said, was absent from the House of Representative's draft of the General Appropriations Act but was added in either in the Senate or during the bicameral conference.

Justice Secretary Jesus Crispin Remulla said that the National Bureau of Investigation will file charges for indirect bribery and malversation against Estrada, Villaneva, and Ako Bicol party-list representative Zaldy Co.

The Independent Commission for Infrastructure filed recommendations for the filing criminal and administrative charges for bribery, graft and corruption, and plunder against Estrada, Villanueva, and Co in October 2025.

On May 28, 2026, the Office of the Ombudsman filed charges of plunder and multiple counts of graft and corruption before the Sandiganbayan against Senator Estrada, former Department of Public Works and Highways (DPWH) Secretary Manuel Bonoan, and several former DPWH officials in connection with the alleged multibillion-peso flood control corruption scandal. The charges stemmed from allegations that Estrada received approximately ₱573 million in kickbacks from flood control projects under the DPWH. The filing came days after the Department of Justice recommended the institution of plunder and graft charges following its investigation into alleged irregularities involving government flood control contracts.

=== Surrender and arrest ===
On 1 June 2026, the Sandiganbayan Fifth Division issued warrants of arrest against Estrada, Bonoan, and former DPWH officials Cortuna, Bulusan, and Gonzales Jr. after finding probable cause to proceed with the non-bailable plunder charge. Just before noon, Estrada questioned the filing of plunder and graft cases against him, with his team asking the court to consolidate the cases, postpone the warrants of arrest, and reinvestigate the cases. Before 14:00 PHT, there was some conspiracy of an arrest warrant against Estrada by the Sandiganbayan Fifth Division. This was confirmed at 14:11 PHT when Department of the Interior and Local Government Secretary Jonvic Remulla confirmed the warrant, stating that the Criminal Investigation and Detection Group (CIDG) would implement it. The Sandiganbayan confirmed the warrant, too, shortly after. Personnel of the CIDG arrived at 14:30 PHT in the Senate building but did not say if they were there to arrest Estrada. At 15:20 PHT, Remulla also arrived in the Senate, stating he was just there for work. At 15:37 PHT, before surrendering, Estrada held a press conference at the Senate together with Senate President Alan Peter Cayetano and fellow majority bloc senators Camille Villar, Rodante Marcoleta, and Imee Marcos. During the press conference, Estrada claimed that he had been approached by intermediaries who allegedly offered to have the cases against him dropped if he left the Senate majority bloc and joined the minority. He said he rejected the proposal and chose to remain with the majority coalition, adding that he will "not fight from the charges," and said that the Legislative Budget Research and Monitoring Office (LBRMO) told the Ombudsman that he did not make any insertions to the 2025 budget. Estrada also announced that he would not seek Senate protective custody and had instructed the Secretary of the Senate to suspend the release of his salary and allowances while he remained in detention.

He subsequently surrendered to the CIDG at the Senate. In a press conference, Remulla revealed that Estrada had attempted to invoke senators' immunity to prevent his arrest, referring to a time when senators were not allowed to be arrested in the Senate building, to which Remulla responded, "Sir, I'm sorry. You lost that privilege when Bato [Senator Ronald Dela Rosa] escaped." During the implementation of the arrest warrant, a heated exchange took place between Cayetano and Remulla, with Cayetano objecting to the arrest being carried out within Senate premises and Remulla insisting that authorities were enforcing a lawful court order. Remulla had added that he had an altercation with one of Estrada's two daughters, although he could not tell which one. Authorities then read to Estrada his Miranda rights before escorting him out. In a vehicle, Estrada left the Senate before 16:00 PHT accompanied by Cayetano and joined by a convoy carrying Remulla. There was debate on whether Estrada had been arrested or surrendered. National Union of Peoples' Lawyers President Ephraim Cortez said that Estrada had only surrendered after arrest had been inevitable. Although Bonoan surrendered too, he was placed under hospital arrest due to a high blood pressure of 192/100, Remulla stating that a stroke was imminent with a blood pressure that high. He still stated that security around him was high and he was not allowed to leave.

At 16:23 PHT, Estrada arrived at Camp Crame. By then, Cortuna had already been admitted to the jail at 17:47 PHT. After undergoing booking procedures at Camp Crame such as medical examination, mugshots, and taking fingerprints, the Sandiganbayan ordered Estrada's detention at the Quezon City Jail in Payatas, where several other respondents in the flood control cases were being held. Cayetano then accompanied Estrada to the CIDG's National Capital Region office. Due to many people accompanying Estrada, the CIDG glass door broke. He stayed at Camp Crame for an hour. For the return of the arrest warrant and commitment order, deciding where he would stay during the trial, Estrada arrived at the Sandiganbayan Fifth Division just a few minutes before 18:00 PHT, where he stayed in the courtroom for more than an hour. He was seen talking to lawyers and relatives and underwent his booking procedure again. Estrada left the court at around 19:40 PHT; when he was walking towards his vehicle, reporters asked him about his third time with a plunder case, yet he did not answer. In a press conference at Camp Crame, Remulla rejected the claim that Estrada had voluntarily surrendered. Estrada underwent the prescribed medical assessments before being admitted to the jail at 20:15 PHT. Estrada was admitted in the same conditions as the general jail population, being treated under the same rules and detention protocols.

==== Aftermath and reactions ====
The arrest led to the disruption of the Senate's scheduled 17:00 PHT session; all 13 majority senators were absent, leaving the 11 members of the minority in the chamber. This led to the stop of the session due to a lack of quorum. The arraignment of Estrada and Bonoan was held on June 2 for their graft case, while their arraignment for the plunder case was held two days later. Assistant Ombudsman Jose Dominic F. Clavano IV rejected Estrada's claims of a removal of cases in exchange for leaving the majority bloc, stating that issues on accountability should not be politicized. The Sandiganbayan placed Estrada under a 90-day preventive suspension on 16 June 2026. On October 13, he was again ordered suspended preventively for 90 days by the Sandiganbayan.

== Other controversies ==
=== Passport incident in Hong Kong ===
In August 2010, Estrada claimed that while traveling to Hong Kong, he experienced a backlash of emotions surrounding the death of eight nationals from Hong Kong during the 2010 Manila hostage crisis. According to him, as he passed through the immigration desk in Hong Kong, officers threw back his passport at him after checking it.

Estrada said the officer may not have known who he was because he used a "regular passport" for personal travel. He also said that he "understood the pain being felt by many Hong Kong nationals".

According to Apple Daily, the Hong Kong immigration department recorded that Estrada visited Hong Kong with a diplomat passport and that from an alleged video surveillance record, he and three other Filipinos were accompanied by staff from the Philippine embassy and had arranged to go through the privileged passage for diplomats. The immigration officer handed back the passport to the Philippines embassy staff, not to Estrada.

=== COVID-19 violations ===
On May 3, 2020, Estrada was arrested over alleged violations of the COVID-19 community quarantine rules in San Juan. He said that he had been distributing relief goods to residents of the city when policemen in two patrol cars arrived at the scene and invited him to the local precinct.

== Personal life ==
In 1989, Estrada married Maria Presentacion "Precy" Vitug with whom he has four children, namely: Janella Marie, Joseph Luis Manuel, Julian Emilio, and Julienne. His daughter Janella is the current Undersecretary of the National Authority for Child Care (an attached agency of the Department of Social Welfare and Development) since 2022, after serving as a councilor and Vice Mayor of San Juan. His wife and son Joseph Luis Manuel were nominees of the Balikatan of Filipino Families (BFF) party-list, which ran but failed to secure congressional seats in 2025.

== Filmography ==
=== Film ===
==== As actor ====
- Markang Rehas: Ikalawang Aklat (1985)
- Paradise Inn (1985)
- Bagets Gang (1986)
- Isa Lang Ang Dapat Mabuhay (1986)
- Sa Kuko Ng Agila (1989)
- Eagle Squad (1989)
- Estribo Gang: The Jinggoy Sese Story (1992) - Vice-Mayor
- The Marita Gonzaga Rape-Slay: In God We Trust (1995)
- The Four Stooges (1995) - Adrian
- Wilson Sorronda: Leader Kuratong Baleleng's Solid Group (1995) - Wilson Sorronda
- Strebel: Gestapo ng Maynila (1998) - Strebel
- Ang Erpat Kong Astig (1998) - Joe
- Hiwaga ng Panday (1998) - Guiller/Panday
- Col. Elmer Jamias: Barako ng Maynila (2000) - as Col. Elmer Jamias
- Sagot Kita Mula Ulo Hanggang Paa (2000) - Ador
- Walang Iwanan, Peksman (2002)
- Utang ng Ama (2003) - Don
- Katas ng Saudi (2007) - Oca
- Magkaibigan (2008) - Ruben
- Kimmy Dora: Kambal sa Kiyeme (2009) - audience member during Kimmy Dora's speech
- Ang Tanging Pamilya (A Marry-Go-Round!) (2009) - young Dindo
- Kimmy Dora and the Temple of Kiyeme (2012) - himself
- Ang Tatay Kong Sexy (2016) - Paquito
- Coming Home (2020) - Benny Librada

==== As executive producer ====
- Pepeng Agimat (1999)
- Palaban (2000)
- Col. Elmer Jamias: Barako ng Maynila (2000)
- Eto na Naman Ako (2000)
- Minsan Ko Lang Sasabihin (2000)

=== Television ===
- Sa Bayan... (2000-2001) - as TV host
- Lorenzo's Time (2012) - as himself

== Awards ==
- Award of Excellence, Asusasyon ng mga Kumentarista at Anaunser ng Pilipinas, 1998
- Annual Young Achievers Award for Government and Public Sector, 1999
- Most Outstanding Government Service Award, Guillermo Mendoza Memorial Scholarship Foundation, Inc., 2011
- Lifetime Achievement Award, Gawad Amerika, 2012
- Men Who Matter, People Asia, 2012
- Distinguished Alumnus in Good Governance Award, University of the Philippines Alumni Association, 2013

| Year | Award-giving body | Category | Nominated work | Results |
|---|---|---|---|---|
| 2000 | PMPC Star Awards for Television | Male Star of the Night | —N/a | Won |

== Notes ==
Political offices
| Preceded by Adolfo Sto. Domingo | Mayor of San Juan; 1992–2001 | Succeeded by JV Ejercito |
Senate of the Philippines
| Preceded by Juan Flavier | President pro tempore of the Senate of the Philippines; 2007–2013 | Succeeded by Ralph Recto |
| Preceded by Juan Ponce Enrile | President of the Senate of the Philippines; Acting; 2013 | Succeeded by Franklin Drilon |
| Preceded by Loren Legarda | President pro tempore of the Senate of the Philippines; 2024–2025 | Succeeded by Panfilo Lacson |
