= IPBA (TV program) =

iPBA
- Genre: Sports
- Developed by: Philippine Basketball Association
- Presented by: Asia Agcaoili
- Country of origin: Philippines
- Original language: Filipino

Production
- Running time: 30 minutes

Original release
- Network: ABC 5
- Release: October 2006 – September 2007

iPBA is a television program that aired on Associated Broadcasting Company that serves as a sort of recap and analysis show reviewing the week's previous games in the Philippine Basketball Association, complete with top plays and special moments. The show was hosted by former Viva Hot Babes group member Asia Agcaoili.

== See also ==
- Philippine Basketball Association
- Associated Broadcasting Company
- PBA on ABC
