= Col. Elmer Jamias: Barako ng Maynila =

2000 Philippine action film

- Directed by: Toto Natividad
- Screenplay by: Willy Laconsay
- Story by: Elmer Jamias
- Produced by: Eric M. Cuatico
- Starring: Jinggoy Estrada
- Cinematography: Ver Dauz
- Edited by: Rogelio Salvador
- Music by: Edwin 'Kiko' Ortega
- Production company: Millennium Cinema
- Distributed by: Millennium Cinema
- Release date: March 29, 2000
- Country: Philippines
- Language: Filipino

Col. Elmer Jamias: Barako ng Maynila is a 2000 Philippine action film directed by Toto Natividad. The film stars Jinggoy Estrada as the titular police officer.

== Cast ==
- Jinggoy Estrada as Col. Elmer Jamias
- Angelu de Leon as Goody Jamias
- John Regala as Berting Andal
- Jeffrey Santos as Adan Andal
- Melissa Mendez as Olga
- Patrick Dela Rosa as Berting's henchman
- Rommel Montano as Berting's henchman
- Dindo Arroyo as Berting's henchman
- Boy Roque as Berting's henchman
- Ray Ventura as SPO2 Raquedan
- Joonee Gamboa as father of Elmer Jamias
- Roldan Aquino as SPO2 Valdez
- Gerald Ejercito as Adan's henchman
- Mike Castillo as Adan's henchman
- Francis Flores as Adan's henchman
- Franz Llanes as Adan's henchman
- Dodie Acuna as Adan's henchman
- Polly Cadsawan as SPO2 Gomez
