= Philip Supnet =

Filipino comedian and actor

- Born: Doughlas Arthur Supnet; May 26, 1959
- Died: December 22, 2025 (aged 66)
- Other names: Philip Supnet; Kuhol
- Occupation: Actor-comedian
- Years active: 1980s–2002, 2023
- Known for: Role of Kuhol of the Mongolian Barbecue franchise

Doughlas Arthur Supnet (May 26, 1959 – December 22, 2025), professionally known as Philip Supnet, was a Filipino comedian and actor. He was also known as Kuhol after the character he played in Mongolian Barbecue.

== Early life ==
Doughlas Arthur Supnet was born on May 26, 1959.

== Career ==
Philip Supnet as a comedian-actor became known by the name "Kuhol" due to his thick lips. He is also known for his small stature.

"Kuhol" is the name of the character Supnet was best known for. Kuhol was the sidekick of Jun Urbano's Mr. Shooli in the 1980s political satire Mongolian Barbecue.

His other appearances in film include Juan Tamad at Mr. Shooli: Mongolian Barbecue (1991), Juan & Ted: Wanted (2000) and Walang Iwanan... Peksman! (2002). His last role was in the 2023 film Nagalit Ang Patay sa Haba ng Lamay: Da Resbak.

== Later life and death ==
In 2007, Supnet was a Barangay councilor in North Fairview, Quezon City. He was reportedly married but bore no child from the union and later separated from his wife.

In April 2018, Supnet was detained by the police for child abuse after allegedly kissing his 10-year old goddaughter in the lips.

Due to family issues, Supnet later became homeless taking shelter in a multi-cab vehicle owned by Barangay North Fairview government. He relied on friends within the community and begging to keep living.

Supnet died on December 22, 2025, due to complications from hyperthyroidism and pneumonia.
