= IKON Philippines =

- Genre: Reality
- Presented by: Asia Agcaoili
- Judges: Vince Parr; Wally Gonzalez; Eugene Villaluz; Jose Mari Chan guest judge (finals); Danny Javier guest judge (finals)
- Country of origin: Philippines
- No. of episodes: 9 (including ASEAN finals)

Production
- Executive producer: Wilson Tieng
- Running time: 60 minutes

Original release
- Network: Radio Philippines Network
- Release: June 17 – August 12, 2007

IKON Philippines is a reality singing competition which searches for a champion among existing or established artistes rather than among new, unknown starlets as in other such singing competitions. The programme was co-launched with IKON Indonesia and IKON Malaysia in late 2006 as an initiative to search for an artiste who can represent the country in the regional (ASEAN) level. The verdict is determined by 70% of jury marks and 30% SMS.

== Background ==
Ikon Philippines began its run on Le Pavilion in June 2007, and is hosted by Asia Agcaoili.

The final stage was held on 5 August 2007. Vina Morales is the Philippine Representative for Solo Category and Kjwan for Group Category

On August 5, 2007, both Vina Morales and Kjwan won the First Ikon ASEAN in their respective categories.

Vina Morales sang "Pangako Sa 'Yo" (A Promise to You), the theme song of the popular drama series of the same name in the Philippines, Malaysia and Indonesia, and "Feels so Nice". Kjwan sang "Invitation" and "One Look".

== Contenders ==
=== Solo ===
- Noel Cabangon
- Chris Cayzer
- Julianne
- Vina Morales (winner, solo category)
- Sitti Navarro
- Grace Nono
- Skarlet
- Top Suzara

=== Group/band ===
- Chicosci
- Chillitees
- The Dawn
- Greyhoundz
- Kala
- Kapatid
- Kjwan (winner, band category)
- Spongecola
- Stone Free
- True Faith
