= Eto Na Naman Ako =

Philippine romantic action film

- Directed by: Ike Jarlego Jr.
- Screenplay by: Bien Ojeda; Paul Daza; Rustom Padilla
- Story by: Bien Ojeda; Robin Padilla
- Produced by: Eric Cuatico
- Starring: Robin Padilla; Vina Morales
- Cinematography: Charlie Peralta
- Edited by: Marya Ignacio
- Music by: Archie Castillo
- Production company: Millennium Cinema
- Distributed by: Millennium Cinema
- Release date: June 7, 2000
- Running time: 98 minutes
- Country: Philippines
- Language: Filipino

Eto Na Naman Ako is a 2000 Philippine romantic action film directed by Ike Jarlego Jr. The film stars Robin Padilla (who co-wrote the film) and Vina Morales. It is loosely based on the 1992 film The Bodyguard.

== Plot ==
Ana Maria (Vina), a successful singer-actress, feels deeply unsafe because of a slew of death threats from an obsessed fan. To ensure her safety, she hires Abet (Robin), who happens to be her childhood sweetheart, to be her bodyguard.

== Cast ==
- Robin Padilla as Abet Dimaguiba
  - Chris Padilla as Young Abet
- Vina Morales as Ana Maria Ledesma
  - Iwi Nicolas as Young Ana
- Troy Montero as Vince Madrigal
- Candy Pangilinan as Silly
- Chinggoy Alonzo as Don Jaime Madrigal
- Rosemarie Gil as Doña Josefa Madrigal
- Charlie Davao as General Acosta
- Allan Paule as Gregory Valdez
- Boy Roque as Clayton Rosales
- July Hidalgo as Mara
- Royette Padilla as Hired Killer
- P.J. Oreta as Hired Killer's Accomplice
- Rico Miguel as Dennis Macaluno
- Boy Abunda as TV Host
- Kris Aquino as TV Host
- Lindsay Custodio as Vanessa Paterno
- Levi Ignacio as Vince's Friend at Party
- Vangie Labalan as Aling Maring
- Jeffrey Tam as Lalaking Praning
- Joe Jardi as Mang Ramon
- Gino Padilla as Dan
- June Hidalgo as Ana's Driver
- Jack Barri as Vince's Bodyguard
- Jun Arenas as Vince's Bodyguard
- Leychard Sicangco as Vince's Bodyguard
- Joey Sarmiento as TV Reporter
- Ed Aquino as Mr. Lee
- Ric Bernardo as MTV Director
- Paul Gutierrez as Mayor
- Gil Carino as Sniper

== Production ==
Padilla was in Basilan when principal photography was supposed to begin. This prompted principal photography to be postponed for two weeks.
