= Maverick Films =

Philippine film production company

- Company type: Film production
- Industry: Motion pictures
- Founded: 1999 (as Millenium Cinema); 2001 (as Maverick Films)
- Headquarters: Manila, Philippines
- Owner: Jinggoy Estrada

Maverick Films is a Philippine film production company owned by Jinggoy Estrada.

== History ==
=== 1999-2001: Millennium Cinema ===
The film company was established in 1999 by actor-politician Jinggoy Estrada and producer Eric Cuatico as Millennium Cinema, serving as a sister company of Jesse Ejercito's Crown Seven Ventures. Pepeng Agimat, its maiden movie starring Bong Revilla, was one of the entries in the 1999 Metro Manila Film Festival. 2000 saw the film company producing several films, such as Eto Na Naman Ako, Minsan Ko Lang Sasabihin, FPJ's Ang Dalubhasa and Ayos Na ang Kasunod, and biopics Col. Elmer Jamias: Barako ng Maynila and Ping Lacson: Super Cop.

On January 3, 2001, amid the impeachment of then President Joseph Estrada, Millennium Cinema, along with Crown Seven Ventures, closed down. At that time, Kaaway Hanggang Hukay and Walang Iwanan, Peksman were the film company's two remaining projects. The former was still under post-production, being released by Ramon Salvador's production company independently on March that year. The latter, which was supposed to be part of the 2000 Metro Manila Film Festival, was still ongoing production, being released by Jolo Films the following year.

=== 2001-present: Maverick Films ===
In March 2001, Millennium Cinema was relaunched by a new group of investors headed by Eric Cuatico as Maverick Films, with Luv Text as its maiden movie. For the next few years, though not as active as its predecessor, it released a string of movies, such as Mananabas, Mano Mano 2, Batas ng Lansangan, Bestman: 4 Better, Not 4 Worse, and www.XXX.com, which launched the career of Juliana Palermo.

In October 2003, Maverick Films closed down after the release of Utang ng Ama.

Since 2007, the film company is used sporadically for Jinggoy Estrada's movies Katas ng Saudi and Magkaibigan, which was one of the entries in the 2008 Metro Manila Film Festival where it won Best Actor award. After over a decade of dormancy, it returned with Coming Home, his comeback movie which was one of the entries in the 2020 Metro Manila Film Festival.
