= Ghost project =

Unfinished or non-existent public infrastructure or development projects

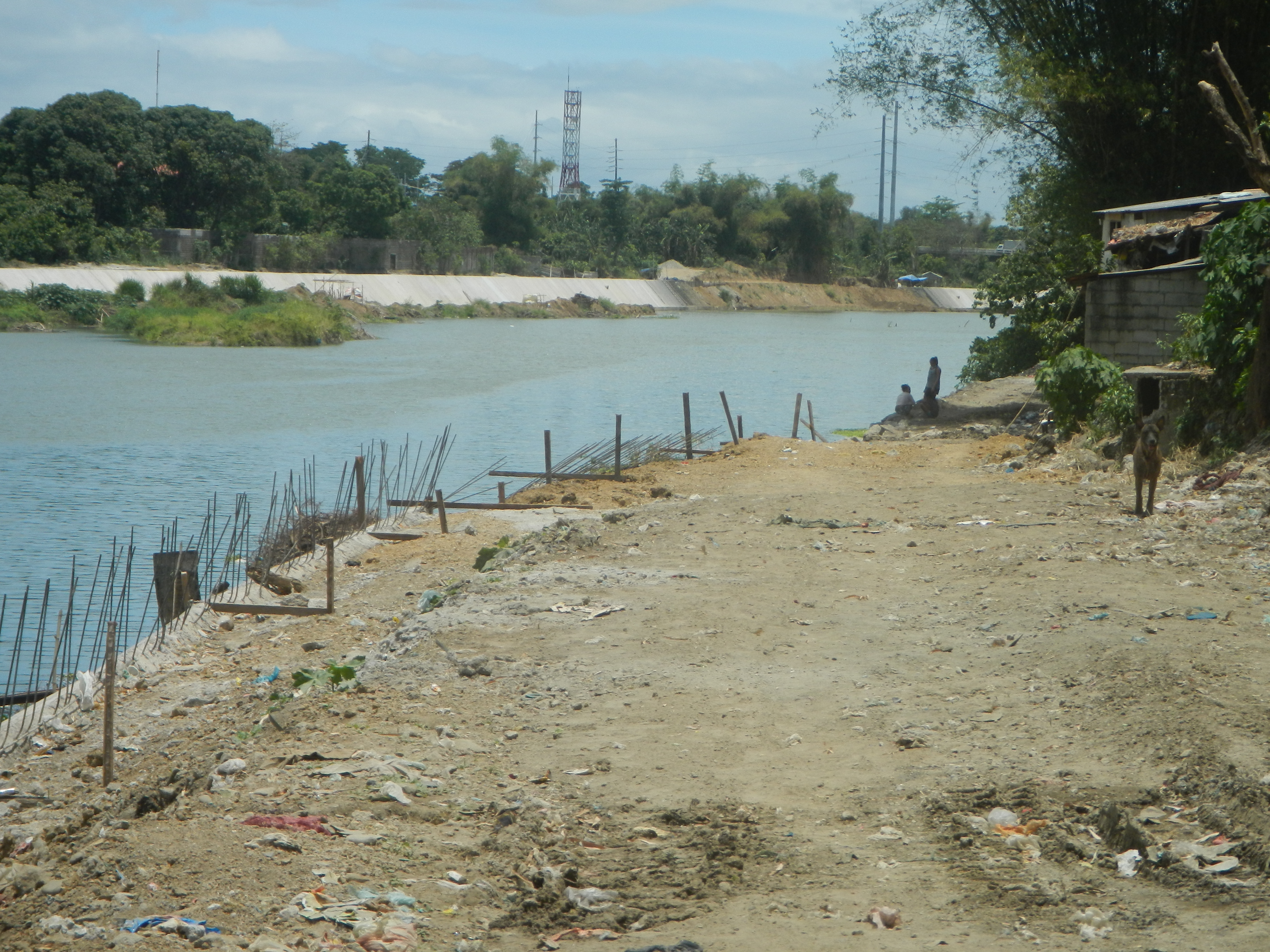
Example of a flood control project under construction, showing infrastructure work that could turn into a "ghost project" if left unfinished.

A ghost project is a development or infrastructure initiative that is officially approved, announced, or funded but ends up never completed, substantially delayed, or existing only in plans or documents with little or no physical implementation. The term is also used in the Philippines to describe a form of corruption in which government officials, sometimes in collusion with private actors, declare a project as "finished" even though it is incomplete or has yet to be built. Such projects are found globally, and are often associated with political ambition, mismanagement, financial constraints, or shifts in priorities.

== Overview ==
Ghost projects are characterized by the gap between their proposed and actual execution. Governments or organizations may announce large-scale developments to gain public approval or political capital, but in practice, construction is postponed, underfunded, or never materializes. Such projects are frequently linked to corruption, where funds are diverted elsewhere, leaving behind incomplete or non-existent results.

== Causes ==
The causes of ghost projects vary depending on local contexts. Common reasons include misallocation of resources, corruption in procurement, poor feasibility studies, lack of stakeholder engagement, or financial crises. In the Philippines, ghost projects have been associated with pork barrel scams and misallocated development funds. Elsewhere, they are linked to abandoned mega-infrastructure projects following regime change, civil unrest, or economic downturns.

In many cases, ghost projects result from a combination of weak institutional oversight, poor planning, and changing political priorities. Projects may be approved without thorough feasibility studies, leading to unrealistic cost estimates and technical difficulties that delay or halt construction. Political changes, such as new administrations or shifts in government priorities, can also lead to the cancellation of ongoing projects, especially those initiated by previous leaders. A study published in the American Journal of Management Practice identifies political interference, corruption, underfunding, and weak institutional oversight as key causes of abandoned infrastructure projects. The study also highlights regional disparities, noting that areas with higher civic participation reported better project completion rates, while regions with poor oversight and political marginalization suffered more project failures.

Additionally, insufficient consultation with local communities can cause projects to fail to meet actual needs, resulting in underused or abandoned infrastructure. Examples from countries such as Nigeria, India, and the Philippines illustrate how these combined factors can produce projects that exist only on paper despite large investments and high expectations.

== Impacts ==
Ghost projects often result in wasted public funds, weakened trust in governance, and environmental or social harm. In many cases, communities expecting improved services, such as roads, hospitals, or flood control systems. Internationally, ghost projects have been reported in Africa, South Asia, and Latin America, raising debates about the effectiveness of foreign aid, debt financing, and governance reforms.

== In the Philippines ==
In the Philippines, ghost projects have been a recurring public concern. Media investigations and government audits have revealed instances where public works were reported as completed on paper but were absent on the ground. Recent reports also show dozens of projects lack basic technical details or appear non-existent across flood control efforts. In Bulacan, the Department of Public Works and Highways (DPWH) has also confirmed allegations of ghost flood control projects in Calumpit, Malolos, and Hagonoy. More recently, the Philippine government has been investigating and calling out contractors for flood control and riverwall projects that were declared completed but are "ghost" in practice, resulting in huge economic losses. According to the Philippine News Agency, a Development Budget Coordination Committee briefing noted that ghost flood control projects from 2023 to 2025 resulted in an estimated ₱42.3 billion to ₱118.5 billion in economic losses.

Commentary has also highlighted how ghost projects mirror other fraudulent practices in government, such as "ghost employees" and "ghost expenses". In 2024, journalist Iris Gonzales of The Philippine Star described how taxpayers' money has been siphoned off through non-existent schools, hospitals, and farm-to-market roads, noting cases flagged by the Commission on Audit in Kalinga and Lanao del Sur.

== See also ==
- Pork barrel
- Public works
- Vaporware
- White elephant (project)
- Ghost soldiers
