= Quezon City Jail =

Jail in Quezon City, Philippines

- Interactive map of Quezon City Jail
- Location: Epifanio de los Santos Avenue corner K-3rd Street, Barangay Kamuning, Quezon City, Philippines; 14°37′46.96″N 121°2′44.11″E
- Status: Operational
- Capacity: 800
- Population: 2,981 (2024)
- Opened: 1953
- Managed by: Bureau of Jail Management and Penology

Quezon City Jail is located in Quezon City northeast of Manila, Philippines, in the National Capital Region (NCR). It reports to the Bureau of Jail Management and Penology (BJMP). The prison was built in 1953 for 800 inmates but has since held 3,800 prisoners.

In 2024, the prison began transferring inmates to a new 2.4-hectare (5.9-acre) facility in Barangay Payatas from its original premises in Barangay Kamuning.

== Facilities ==
=== Kamuning ===
The original prison facility in Kamuning has a total floor area of about 30,000 square feet (2,800 m^{2}). In the early months of the Philippine drug war in 2016, the prison population reached 4,053 with only 20 guards to monitor them. Around 60% of the inmates were facing drug-related charges. The congestion was also attributed to the inability of most inmates to pay for their bail. Three quarters of the prison population belonged to one gang or another, among Bahala Na, Sigue Sigue Sputnik, Batang City Jail, or Commando gangs. These gangs marked out their jurisdiction inside the prison through murals. By 2021, the prison population had decreased to 3,184, which still amounted to a congestion rate of 1,066%.

In 2020, during the COVID-19 pandemic, nine inmates and nine personnel were infected with COVID-19.

=== Payatas ===
The new prison facility, which was built on land formerly owned by the Quezon City government, consists of three five-story buildings consisting of 440 cells built to handle 20 inmates each. It also contains a visiting area, basketball court, and sunning area for prisoners.
