= Dagul =

Filipino actor (born 1958)

- Born: Romeo Queddeng Pastrana; October 5, 1958 (age 67); Victorias, Negros Occidental, Philippines
- Occupations: Actor, comedian, model, Politician
- Years active: 1998–2019; 2022–present
- Known for: Goin' Bulilit
- Height: 60 cm (2 ft 0 in)
- Children: 4

Romeo "Romy" Queddeng Pastrana (born October 5, 1958), known professionally as Dagul, is a Filipino actor and comedian best known for being a host of the children's sketch program Goin' Bulilit. He has dwarfism.

== Career ==
Pastrana was scouted by singer-host Randy Santiago in 1998. Santiago would later dub him "Dagul", which is a colloquial term in Kapampangan meaning "tall" or "big" which contrasts his short stature.

From doing smaller roles in movies such as Isprikitik, Walastik Kung Pumitik (1999) and Juan & Ted: Wanted (2000), Dagul gained even more exposure when he became Long Mejia's sparring partner in GMA's sitcom Kool Ka Lang (2001).

When Mejia transferred to ABS-CBN, Dagul followed him to the new station. Mejia became a regular co-host of Willie Revillame's Masayang Tanghali Bayan, while Dagul made guest appearances.

After the tandem split up, Dagul, became a mainstay of the sitcom Ok Fine Whatever (2003) and Goin' Bulilit where he was the only adult in the children's Sunday gag show. Dagul was the only original cast member of Goin' Bulilit to remain in its entire run until 2019, as the children cast members "graduated" from the show once they became teenagers.

== Personal life ==
In October 2010, Dagul was proclaimed kagawad of Barangay San Jose in Rodriguez, Rizal after receiving the highest number of votes for the position. He campaigned himself as "The Little Man With a Big Heart" and ran on a platform of putting up daycare centers and deploying additional medical personnel in poor areas.

Dagul is married and has four children. Only his youngest daughter, Jkhriez Pastrana, inherited his dwarfism. As of 2022, Dagul works at his local barangay hall as head of its command center and operates a small sari-sari store.

== Filmography ==
=== Television ===
- Kool Ka Lang (1998–2002)
- Ok Fine Whatever (2003)
- Maalaala Mo Kaya: Stuffed Toy (2003)
- Masayang Tanghali Bayan (2003–2004)
- Yes, Yes Show! (2004–2005)
- Goin' Bulilit (2005–2019)
- Magpakailanman: Ang Dakilang Kong Ama (2022)
- Black Rider (2023–2024)
- FPJ's Batang Quiapo (2024–2026)

=== Film ===
- Yes Darling: Walang Matigas Na Pulis 2 (1997)
- Isprikitik, Walastik Kung Pumitik (1999)
- Juan & Ted: Wanted - Chuck (2000)
- Burlesk King Daw, O! (2000)
- D'Uragons: Never Umuurong, Always Sumusulong (2002)
- Cass & Cary: Who Wants to Be a Billionaire? (2002)
- Mr. Suave (2003)
- Sakal, Sakali, Saklolo (2007)
- Corazon: Ang Unang Aswang (2012)

== See also ==
- Weng Weng
