= List of ABS-CBN Studios original drama series =

The following is the list of original Philippine television drama series distributed by ABS-CBN Studios, a television production and distribution company owned by ABS-CBN Corporation. Drama series are sorted in the decade and the year of its release, with the official international title included in parentheses.

== Lists ==
=== 1960s ===
Title	Premiere	Finale
1962
Mga Bayani sa Kalawakan	January 5, 1962	June 7, 1963
1963
Hiwaga sa Bahay na Bato	September 30, 1963	January 25, 1964
Larawan ng Pag-Ibig	1963	February 28, 1964
1966
Prinsipe Amante	1966	

=== 1970s ===
Title	Premiere	Finale
Elisa	1970	September 22, 1972
Malvera	1970	

=== 1980s ===
Title	Premiere	Finale
1986
Angkan	September 15, 1986	1988
Luneta: Discovery Hour	September 15, 1986	November 21, 1986
Hilakbot	September 15, 1986	November 21, 1986
Ina	September 15, 1986	December 12, 1986
1987
Ang Pamilya Ko	April 1987	June 1987
Si Raven at ang Magandang buhay	October 1987	1988
1988
Pag-ibig o Karangalan	1988	1990
Umiikot ang Kapalaran	1988	1988
1989
Agila	February 20, 1989	February 7, 1992
Bubog sa Puso	1989	1989
Sta. Zita at si Mary Rose	1989	1991
Anna Luna	November 27, 1989	September 30, 1994

=== 1990s ===
Title	Premiere	Finale
1991
Isabel, Sugo ng Birhen	1991	January 3, 1992
Sebya, Mahal Kita	1991	August 14, 1992
1992
Valiente	February 10, 1992	January 27, 1995
Mara Clara	August 17, 1992	February 14, 1997
Alab	September 6, 1992	1993
1996
Familia Zaragoza	April 28, 1996	March 9, 1997
Gimik	June 15, 1996	February 6, 1999
1997
Esperanza	February 17, 1997	July 30, 1999
Mula sa Puso	March 10, 1997	April 9, 1999
!Oka Tokat	June 24, 1997	May 7, 2002
1998
Sa Sandaling Kailangan Mo Ako	November 16, 1998	September 6, 1999
1999
Marinella	February 8, 1999	May 11, 2001
G-mik	February 20, 1999	June 15, 2002
Ang Munting Paraiso	March 6, 1999	May 11, 2002
Tabing Ilog	March 14, 1999	October 19, 2003
Bantay	March 22, 1999	April 2, 1999
Saan Ka Man Naroroon	April 12, 1999	March 23, 2001
Labs Ko Si Babe	August 2, 1999	November 10, 2000

=== 2000s ===
Title	Premiere	Finale
2000
Pangako Sa 'Yo (The Promise)	November 13, 2000	September 20, 2002
2001
Sa Dulo ng Walang Hanggan (Till the End of Time)	March 26, 2001	February 28, 2003
Recuerdo de Amor (Memories of Love)	May 14, 2001	January 10, 2003
Sa Puso Ko, Iingatan Ka (Keeping You in My Heart)	June 18, 2001	February 14, 2003
Your Honor	June 22, 2001	July 5, 2002
2002
Kay Tagal Kang Hinintay (The Long Wait)	July 8, 2002	November 14, 2003
Bituin (Star)	September 23, 2002	May 23, 2003
Berks	November 16, 2002	March 20, 2004
2003
Darating ang Umaga (Till Morning Comes)	March 3, 2003	November 14, 2003
Sana'y Wala Nang Wakas (Timeless)	May 19, 2003	July 9, 2004
Basta't Kasama Kita (As Long As I'm With You)	May 26, 2003	September 10, 2004
Buttercup	May 31, 2003	February 7, 2004
It Might Be You	December 8, 2003	December 10, 2004
2004
Marina	February 23, 2004	November 12, 2004
Sarah the Teen Princess	March 1, 2004	October 22, 2004
Mangarap Ka (You Dreamed)	March 22, 2004	October 8, 2004
Hiram (Stolen Moments)	July 12, 2004	May 20, 2005
Maid in Heaven	August 16, 2004	November 19, 2004
Krystala	October 11, 2004	April 22, 2005
Spirits	December 6, 2004	May 6, 2005
2005
'Til Death Do Us Part	January 31, 2005	May 13, 2005
Mga Anghel na Walang Langit (Angels Without a Heaven)	May 9, 2005	February 24, 2006
Ikaw ang Lahat sa Akin (Only You)	May 16, 2005	November 4, 2005
Kampanerang Kuba (Enchanting Fatima)	June 6, 2005	December 16, 2005
Vietnam Rose	September 19, 2005	February 10, 2006
Panday	November 7, 2005	May 26, 2006
2006
Gulong ng Palad (Stand for Love)	January 9, 2006	May 12, 2006
Sa Piling Mo (Here with Me)	February 27, 2006	August 25, 2006
Bituing Walang Ningning	May 15, 2006	October 6, 2006
Calla Lily	May 29, 2006	September 8, 2006
Super Inggo	August 28, 2006	February 9, 2007
Crazy for You	September 11, 2006	November 30, 2006
Maging Sino Ka Man (More than Love)	October 9, 2006	May 25, 2007
2007
Sana Maulit Muli (Chances)	January 8, 2007	April 20, 2007
Maria Flordeluna	February 12, 2007	June 22, 2007
Palimos ng Pag-ibig (Begging for Love)	March 5, 2007	April 20, 2007
Rounin	April 16, 2007	July 26, 2007
Hiram na Mukha	April 23, 2007	June 1, 2007
Walang Kapalit	April 23, 2007	August 31, 2007
May Minamahal (Loving Someone)	June 4, 2007	July 13, 2007
Ysabella	June 25, 2007	January 25, 2008
Natutulog Ba ang Diyos?	July 16, 2007	October 12, 2007
Margarita	July 30, 2007	September 21, 2007
Kokey	August 6, 2007	November 9, 2007
Pangarap na Bituin	September 3, 2007	December 7, 2007
Mars Ravelo's Lastikman	September 24, 2007	January 25, 2008
Prinsesa ng Banyera (Fish Port Princess)	October 8, 2007	May 23, 2008
Super Inggo 1.5: Ang Bagong Bangis	November 3, 2007	December 15, 2007
Princess Sarah	November 12, 2007	December 21, 2007
Maging Sino Ka Man: Ang Pagbabalik (More Than Love 2)	December 10, 2007	March 28, 2008
2008
Patayin sa Sindak si Barbara	January 7, 2008	January 25, 2008
Kung Fu Kids	January 28, 2008	April 25, 2008
Palos	January 28, 2008	April 25, 2008
Lobo (She Wolf, The Last Sentinel)	January 28, 2008	July 11, 2008
Maligno	April 28, 2008	May 23, 2008
Ligaw Na Bulaklak	May 26, 2008	October 24, 2008
My Girl	May 26, 2008	September 5, 2008
Iisa Pa Lamang (My Only One)	July 14, 2008	November 7, 2008
Dyosa	August 11, 2008	January 16, 2009
I Love Betty La Fea	September 8, 2008	April 24, 2009
Kahit Isang Saglit (A Time for Us)	September 15, 2008	December 12, 2008
Pieta	October 27, 2008	May 1, 2009
Eva Fonda	December 1, 2008	February 6, 2009
2009
Tayong Dalawa (The Two of Us)	January 19, 2009	September 25, 2009
May Bukas Pa	February 2, 2009	February 5, 2010 (Note: Original broadcast cut version on ABS-CBN.)
May Bukas Pa	July 2012	December 5, 2013 (Note: Extended and clean feed version on TFC online (some episodes) and continued to TV through Jeepney TV from March 11, 2013.)
Kambal sa Uma	April 20, 2009	October 9, 2009
Only You	April 27, 2009	August 21, 2009
Bud Brothers	May 4, 2009	August 28, 2009
The Wedding	June 29, 2009	September 4, 2009
Katorse	August 24, 2009	January 8, 2010
Dahil May Isang Ikaw (Destined Hearts)	August 24, 2009	January 15, 2010
Ang Lalaking Nagmahal Sa Akin	August 31, 2009	October 16, 2009
Florinda	September 7, 2009	October 2, 2009
Lovers in Paris	September 28, 2009	December 11, 2009
Nagsimula sa Puso (It Started from the Heart)	October 12, 2009	January 22, 2010
Somewhere in My Heart	October 19, 2009	December 4, 2009
My Cheating Heart	December 7, 2009	January 29, 2010

=== 2010s ===
Title	Premiere	Finale
2010
Tanging Yaman (Only Treasure)	January 11, 2010	May 21, 2010
Kung Tayo'y Magkakalayo (If We Were To Be Apart)	January 18, 2010	July 9, 2010
Magkano ang Iyong Dangal?	January 25, 2010	May 14, 2010
Love Is Only in the Movies	February 1, 2010	February 12, 2010
Habang May Buhay	February 1, 2010	May 14, 2010
Agua Bendita	February 8, 2010	September 3, 2010
The Substitute Bride	February 15, 2010	February 26, 2010
Rubi	February 15, 2010	August 13, 2010
You're Mine, Only Mine	March 1, 2010	March 12, 2010
Lumang Piso Para sa Puso	March 15, 2010	March 31, 2010
Love Me Again	April 5, 2010	May 14, 2010
Gimik 2010	April 25, 2010	July 11, 2010
Impostor	May 17, 2010	September 17, 2010
Rosalka	May 17, 2010	October 22, 2010
Momay	May 24, 2010	September 17, 2010
Magkaribal (Rivals)	June 28, 2010	November 5, 2010
Midnight Phantom	July 12, 2010	August 13, 2010
Noah	July 12, 2010	February 4, 2011
Kristine	August 16, 2010	February 11, 2011
1DOL	September 6, 2010	October 22, 2010
Alyna	September 20, 2010	February 11, 2011
Kokey at Ako	September 20, 2010	December 3, 2010
Imortal (Immortal)	October 4, 2010	April 29, 2011
Juanita Banana	October 25, 2010	February 18, 2011
Mara Clara	October 25, 2010	June 3, 2011
Sabel	December 6, 2010	March 11, 2011
2011
Mutya	January 31, 2011	May 6, 2011
Green Rose	February 14, 2011	May 27, 2011
Mana Po	February 21, 2011	April 1, 2011
Minsan Lang Kita Iibigin (One Great Love)	March 7, 2011	August 19, 2011
Mula sa Puso	March 28, 2011	August 12, 2011
Good Vibes	April 3, 2011	August 28, 2011
100 Days to Heaven	May 9, 2011	November 18, 2011
Guns and Roses	June 6, 2011	September 23, 2011
Reputasyon	July 11, 2011	January 20, 2012
Maria la del Barrio	August 15, 2011	March 2, 2012
My Binondo Girl (Jade)	August 22, 2011	January 20, 2012
Growing Up	September 4, 2011	February 12, 2012
Nasaan Ka, Elisa? (Where's Elisa? (Note: unofficial international title and not listed on ABS-CBN International Distribution website))	September 12, 2011	January 13, 2012
Budoy	October 10, 2011	March 9, 2012
Angelito: Batang Ama	November 14, 2011	April 13, 2012
Ikaw ay Pag-Ibig	November 21, 2011	January 27, 2012
2012
Walang Hanggan (My Eternal)	January 16, 2012	October 26, 2012
Lumayo Ka Man Sa Akin	January 23, 2012	May 4, 2012
Mundo Man ay Magunaw	January 30, 2012	July 13, 2012
E-Boy	January 30, 2012	April 13, 2012
Oka2kat	February 4, 2012	May 5, 2012
Wako Wako	March 5, 2012	May 25, 2012
Dahil sa Pag-ibig (Confessions of the Heart)	March 12, 2012	June 29, 2012
Kung Ako'y Iiwan Mo (Without You)	April 16, 2012	November 16, 2012
Princess and I	April 16, 2012	February 1, 2013
Aryana	May 7, 2012	January 25, 2013
Hiyas	May 28, 2012	July 13, 2012
Lorenzo's Time	July 2, 2012	October 5, 2012
Be Careful with My Heart	July 9, 2012	November 28, 2014
Kahit Puso'y Masugatan (Hearts on Fire)	July 9, 2012	February 1, 2013
Pintada	July 16, 2012	November 2, 2012
Angelito: Ang Bagong Yugto	July 16, 2012	December 14, 2012
Ina, Kapatid, Anak (Her Mother's Daughter)	October 8, 2012	June 14, 2013
A Beautiful Affair	October 29, 2012	January 18, 2013
Paraiso	November 5, 2012	April 5, 2013
2013
Kailangan Ko'y Ikaw (All for Love)	January 21, 2013	April 19, 2013
May Isang Pangarap (There's One Dream)	January 21, 2013	May 17, 2013
Kahit Konting Pagtingin (Just One Glance)	January 28, 2013	April 12, 2013
Juan dela Cruz	February 4, 2013	October 25, 2013
Apoy sa Dagat (Raging Love)	February 11, 2013	July 5, 2013
Little Champ	March 18, 2013	May 24, 2013
Dugong Buhay (Raging Blood)	April 8, 2013	September 27, 2013
My Little Juan	May 20, 2013	September 13, 2013
Annaliza	May 27, 2013	March 21, 2014
Huwag Ka Lang Mawawala (Against All Odds)	June 17, 2013	August 23, 2013
Muling Buksan ang Puso (If Only)	July 8, 2013	October 4, 2013
Got to Believe	August 26, 2013	March 7, 2014
Bukas na Lang Kita Mamahalin (Tomorrow Can Wait)	September 2, 2013	November 15, 2013
Galema: Anak ni Zuma (Galema: Daughter of Zuma)	September 30, 2013	March 28, 2014
Maria Mercedes	October 7, 2013	January 24, 2014
Honesto	October 28, 2013	March 14, 2014
2014
The Legal Wife	January 27, 2014	June 13, 2014
Ikaw Lamang (No Greater Love)	March 10, 2014	October 24, 2014
Dyesebel	March 17, 2014	July 18, 2014
Mirabella	March 24, 2014	July 4, 2014
Moon of Desire	March 31, 2014	August 15, 2014
Sana Bukas pa ang Kahapon (Tomorrow Belongs to Me)	June 16, 2014	October 10, 2014
Pure Love	July 7, 2014	November 14, 2014
Hawak Kamay (Instant Dad)	July 21, 2014	November 21, 2014
Two Wives	October 13, 2014	March 13, 2015
Forevermore	October 27, 2014	May 22, 2015
Bagito (The Newbie)	November 17, 2014	March 13, 2015
Dream Dad	November 24, 2014	April 17, 2015
2015
Oh My G!	January 19, 2015	July 24, 2015
FlordeLiza	January 19, 2015	August 28, 2015
Nasaan Ka Nang Kailangan Kita (Waiting for Love)	January 19, 2015	October 16, 2015
Inday Bote	March 16, 2015	May 29, 2015
Bridges of Love	March 16, 2015	August 7, 2015
Nathaniel	April 20, 2015	September 25, 2015
Pangako sa 'Yo (The Promise)	May 25, 2015	February 12, 2016
Pasión de Amor	June 1, 2015	February 26, 2016
Ningning	July 27, 2015	January 15, 2016
On the Wings of Love	August 10, 2015	February 26, 2016
Doble Kara	August 24, 2015	February 10, 2017
All of Me	August 31, 2015	January 29, 2016
FPJ's Ang Probinsyano (Brothers)	September 28, 2015	August 12, 2022
Walang Iwanan	October 19, 2015	December 4, 2015
You're My Home	November 9, 2015	March 23, 2016
And I Love You So	December 7, 2015	March 11, 2016
2016
Be My Lady	January 18, 2016	November 25, 2016
Tubig at Langis (Broken Vows)	February 1, 2016	September 2, 2016
Dolce Amore	February 15, 2016	August 26, 2016
We Will Survive	February 29, 2016	July 15, 2016
The Story of Us	February 29, 2016	June 17, 2016
My Super D	April 18, 2016	July 15, 2016
Born for You	June 20, 2016	September 16, 2016
Till I Met You	August 29, 2016	January 20, 2017
The Greatest Love	September 5, 2016	April 21, 2017
Magpahanggang Wakas (I'll Never Say Goodbye)	September 19, 2016	January 6, 2017
Langit Lupa (Heaven and Earth)	November 28, 2016	April 28, 2017
2017
A Love to Last	January 9, 2017	September 22, 2017
My Dear Heart	January 23, 2017	June 16, 2017
The Better Half	February 13, 2017	September 8, 2017
Wildflower	February 13, 2017	February 9, 2018
Pusong Ligaw (Lost Hearts)	April 24, 2017	January 12, 2018
Ikaw Lang ang Iibigin (Forever My Love)	May 1, 2017	January 26, 2018
La Luna Sangre	June 19, 2017	March 2, 2018
The Promise of Forever	September 11, 2017	November 24, 2017
The Good Son	September 25, 2017	April 13, 2018
Hanggang Saan (A Mother's Guilt)	November 27, 2017	April 27, 2018
2018
Asintado	January 15, 2018	October 5, 2018
Sana Dalawa ang Puso (Two Hearts)	January 29, 2018	September 14, 2018
The Blood Sisters	February 12, 2018	August 17, 2018
Bagani	March 5, 2018	August 17, 2018
Since I Found You	April 16, 2018	August 10, 2018
Araw Gabi	April 30, 2018	October 12, 2018
Halik (Betrayal)	August 13, 2018	April 26, 2019
Ngayon at Kailanman (Now and Forever)	August 20, 2018	January 18, 2019
Playhouse	September 17, 2018	March 22, 2019
Kadenang Ginto (The Heiress)	October 8, 2018	February 7, 2020
Los Bastardos	October 15, 2018	September 27, 2019
2019
The General's Daughter	January 21, 2019	October 4, 2019
Nang Ngumiti ang Langit (Michaela)	March 25, 2019	October 18, 2019
Hiwaga ng Kambat	April 21, 2019	August 25, 2019
Sino ang Maysala? (Mea Culpa)	April 29, 2019	August 9, 2019
The Killer Bride	August 12, 2019	January 17, 2020
Parasite Island	September 8, 2019	December 1, 2019
Pamilya Ko (My Family)	September 9, 2019	March 13, 2020
Sandugo (Fists of Fate)	September 30, 2019	March 20, 2020
Starla	October 7, 2019	January 10, 2020
The Haunted	December 8, 2019	February 9, 2020

=== 2020s ===
Title	Premiere	Finale
2020
Make It with You	January 13, 2020	March 13, 2020
A Soldier's Heart	January 20, 2020	September 18, 2020
Love Thy Woman	February 10, 2020	September 11, 2020
24/7	February 23, 2020	March 15, 2020
Ang sa Iyo ay Akin (The Law of Revenge)	August 17, 2020	March 19, 2021
Walang Hanggang Paalam (Irreplaceable)	September 28, 2020	April 16, 2021
Bagong Umaga (New Beginnings)	October 26, 2020	April 30, 2021
2021
Huwag Kang Mangamba (Mysterious Destiny)	March 22, 2021	November 12, 2021
Init sa Magdamag (When Love Burns)	April 19, 2021	September 10, 2021
He's Into Her	May 30, 2021	August 14, 2022
La Vida Lena	June 28, 2021	February 4, 2022
Marry Me, Marry You	September 13, 2021	January 21, 2022
Viral Scandal	November 15, 2021	May 13, 2022
2022
The Broken Marriage Vow	January 24, 2022	June 24, 2022
2 Good 2 Be True	May 16, 2022	November 11, 2022
Love in 40 Days	May 30, 2022	October 28, 2022
Flower of Evil	June 25, 2022	October 9, 2022
A Family Affair	June 27, 2022	November 4, 2022
Mars Ravelo's Darna	August 15, 2022	February 10, 2023
The Iron Heart	November 14, 2022	October 13, 2023
2023
Dirty Linen	January 23, 2023	August 25, 2023
FPJ's Batang Quiapo (Gangs of Manila)	February 13, 2023	March 13, 2026
Unbreak My Heart	May 29, 2023	November 16, 2023
Nag-aapoy na Damdamin (Flames of Vengeance)	July 25, 2023	January 26, 2024
Pira-Pirasong Paraiso (Broken Paradise)	July 25, 2023	January 27, 2024
Senior High	August 28, 2023	January 19, 2024
Can't Buy Me Love	October 16, 2023	May 10, 2024
2024
Linlang: The Teleserye Version (Deceit)	January 22, 2024	June 14, 2024
High Street	May 13, 2024	August 30, 2024
Pamilya Sagrado (Sagrado)	June 17, 2024	November 15, 2024
Lavender Fields	September 2, 2024	January 17, 2025
2025
Incognito	January 20, 2025	July 18, 2025
Saving Grace: The Untold Story	March 3, 2025	June 20, 2025
Sins of the Father	June 23, 2025	November 21, 2025
It's Okay to Not Be Okay	July 21, 2025	October 17, 2025
What Lies Beneath	October 20, 2025	April 1, 2026
Roja	November 24, 2025	March 13, 2026
2026
The Secrets of Hotel 88	March 2, 2026	June 26, 2026
The Alibi: Ang Buong Katotohanan	March 16, 2026	July 24, 2026
Blood vs Duty	April 6, 2026	July 24, 2026
Coco Martin's Sigabo	June 22, 2026	—N/a
Someone, Someday	July 27, 2026	November 27, 2026
The Loyalty Game: Level Up	October 5, 2026	—N/a

== Unaired ==
- Apat na Maria
- Alta
- Written in Our Stars
- Bagwis
- Bandidas
- Confradia
- Honey My Love So Sweet
- Magica Blanca
- LuzViMinda
- Someone to Watch Over Me

== See also ==
- List of programs broadcast by ABS-CBN
- List of programs broadcast by Kapamilya channel
- List of programs distributed by ABS-CBN Studios
- List of Philippine drama series
