= Martha Cecilia =

Filipino writer

- Born: Maribeth Dela Cruz Hamoy; 13 May 1953; Dapitan, Zamboanga, Philippines
- Died: 8 December 2014 (aged 61); Meycauayan, Bulacan, Philippines
- Occupation: Author
- Writing career
- Period: 1997–2014
- Genre: Romance

Martha Cecilia (13 May 1953 – 8 December 2014) was a Filipino writer of Tagalog romance pocketbook novels. She was the author of best selling novel series Kristine and Sweetheart. Many of her novels were serialized by ABS-CBN under Precious Hearts Romances Presents.

== Personal life ==
Maribeth dela Cruz or popularly known as Martha Cecilia was born on May 13, 1953, in the city of Dapitan in Zamboanga del Norte, Philippines.

She was a commerce graduate from the University of the East, Manila and said to have finished in Conchitina Bernardo’s Karilagan Finishing School in Sta. Mesa.

Martha Cecilia had 4 children, Jose Paolo (also a writer under the penname JP Adrian), Marta Cecilia (her daughter where she got her pen name and also a writer under the penname Tsina Cajayon), Nina Martinne and Juan Miguel.

Martha Cecilia succumbed to cancer on December 8, 2014.

== Career ==
Martha Cecilia's writing career was inspired after her meeting with Tagalog novelist Olga Medina. Her first work 'Akin Ka Noon, Ngayon at Magpakailanman' was published in 1997 by Precious Pages Corp. under its subsidiary Precious Hearts Romances.

She had written more than a hundred novels under different titles for Precious Hearts Romance like 'GEMS', 'My Love, My Hero', 'My Lovely Bride', 'PHR Classics', 'All Time Favorites', 'Sweetheart' and her much acclaimed series 'Kristine'.

== Television ==
Martha Cecilia had written novels which were later adapted to TV series which includes the gold medal awardee Impostor for Best Telenovela Category in International Emmy Awards.

Air Date	Book	Precious Hearts Romances Presents	Cast
December 7, 2009 - January 29, 2010	Sweetheart 8: My Cheating Heart	My Cheating Heart	Cristine Reyes, Jake Cuenca, Bangs Garcia, Tom Rodriguez
May 17, 2010 – September 17, 2010	Impostor	Impostor	Sam Milby, Maja Salvador, Melai Cantiveros
July 12, 2010 - August 13, 2010	Midnight Phantom	Midnight Phantom	Rafael Rosell, Denise Laurel, Ina Raymundo
September 20, 2010 – February 11, 2011	Dominic	Alyna	Shaina Magdayao, Jason Abalos, Sid Lucero
August 16, 2010 – February 11, 2011	Kristine Series	Kristine	Cristine Reyes, Zanjoe Marudo, Rafael Rosell, Denise Laurel
January 23, 2012 - May 4, 2012	Pangako	Lumayo Ka Man Sa Akin	Maja Salvador, Jason Abalos, Patrick Garcia
February 15, 2010 - February 26, 2010	The Substitute Bride	The Substitute Bride	Rafael Rosell, Paw Diaz, Carla Humphries
March 1, 2010 - March 12, 2010	You're Mine, Only Mine	You're Mine, Only Mine	Denise Laurel, Will Devaughn, Rey "PJ" Abellana
April 30, 2018 - October 12, 2018	El Paraiso	Araw Gabi	JM de Guzman, Barbie Imperial, RK Bagatsing

== Bibliography ==
=== Kristine Series ===
- The Devil's Kiss
- Ang Sisiw at Ang Agila
- Dahil Ikaw
- Jewel, Black Diamond
- Villa Kristine
- Amoré (Beloved Stranger)
- Franco Navarro
- Wild Rose
- Magic Moment
- Wild Heart 1 & 2
- Endlessly 1, 2 & 3
- Rose Tattoo 1 & 2
- Romano
- Kapeng Barako at Krema 1 & 2
- Romano 2
- Hasta La Proxima Vez 1, 2 & 3
- Panther Walks 1 & 2
- One Wish 1 & 2
- James Navarro 1 & 2
- My Wild Heiress 1 & 2
- The Blue-Eyed Devil 1 & 2
- Wild Passion 1 & 2
- Wild Enchantment 1 & 2
- Ivan Henrick
- Have You Looked Into My Heart 1 & 2
- Trace Lavigne 1 & 2
- The Warrior: Brad Sta. de Leones 1, 2 & 3
- Alessandro Leon 1, 2 & 3
- Leon Fortalejo: Ang Simula Ng Wakas
- Magic Moment Book 2: I Have Kept You In My Heart
- The Bodyguards: Tennessee
- MONTE FALCO: Island In The Sun (Revised Edition)
- The Bodyguards: Jose Luis Morrison Monte Falco

=== Sweetheart Series ===
- Sweetheart 1
- Sweetheart 2: Lavender Lace
- Sweetheart 3: You Belong To My Heart
- Sweetheart 4: My Knight In Shining Armour
- Sweetheart 5: All My Love
- Sweetheart 6: Mrs. Winters
- Sweetheart 7: Somewhere Between Lovers and Friends
- Sweetheart 8: My Cheating Heart
- Sweetheart 9: Mananatili Kitang Mahal
- Sweetheart 10: How Did I Fall In Love With You?
- Sweetheart 11: My Own True Love
- Sweetheart 12: Charles' Angel
- Sweetheart 13: Someday My Prince
- Sweetheart 14: Sensual
- Sweetheart 15: A Kiss Remembered
- Sweetheart 16: My Wayward Wife
- Sweetheart 17: Someone To Watch Over Me
- Sweetheart 18: My Long-Time Friend, My One-Week Wife
- Sweetheart 19: She Wears My Ring

=== My Love, My Hero ===
- Dominic
- JSS
- Mitch 1 & 2
- Kiel 1 & 2
- Hanz
- Montañez 1 & 2

=== PHR Classics ===
- Midnight Phantom
- Impostor
- Sinner or Saint
- Iniibig Kita... Mahirap Bang Sabihin Iyon?
- Marry Me, Stranger

=== Gems ===
- Pangako
- Minsan... Dito Sa Puso Ko
- Hello Again, My Heart
- Sunset and You (Revised Version of Akin Ka Noon, Ngayon, at Kailanman)
- Mystic
- Arrivederci, Roma
- SAGADA: Nayakap Ko Ang Mga Ulap
- CORON: Iisa Lang Ang Puso Ko
- The Farmer and the Heiress

=== Secrets ===
- Hello Again, Stranger
- Ikaw Ay Ako O Ako Ay Ikaw

=== My Lovely Bride ===
- Regina and Luke
- Mackenzie and James

=== Monte Falco ===
- Monte Falco: Island In The Sun 1
- Monte Falco: Island In The Sun 2

=== All-Time Favorite Collection ===
- Dugtungan Mo Ang Isang Magandang Alaala
- Akin Ka Noon, Ngayon, at Kailanman (Revised as Sunset and You)
- Nang Gabing Maging Akin Ka
- Roses Are Red, Violets Are Blue
- Aagawin Kita Sa Kanya
- With This Ring...
- Only You
- Be My Love, Catherine
- For The Love Of Alyssa
- Kung Kaya Mo Nang Sabihing Mahal Mo Ako
- Mga Latay Ng Pag-ibig
- Ikaw, Ikaw Ang Iniibig Ko
- Apoy Sa Malamig Na Puso
- Be Still, My Heart
- Leia, My Love
- Forbidden Love
- Ganoon Kita Kamahal
- You're Mine, Only Mine
- Beloved Enemy
- First Time I Saw You
- Sexy and Dangerous
- When Fools Rush In
- Mananatili Kang Akin
- Ang Lalaking Hindi Ko Pinangarap
- Love Trap
- I'm Crazy For You
- Almost A Fairy Tale
- El Paraiso
- The Substitute Bride (Revised Edition)

=== PHR Gothic Romance ===
- The Wolf and the Beauty
- It's Just A Fantasy

== Sources ==
- "romancenovels". Archived from the original on 2008-11-01.
- "Precious Hearts Romances marks TV anniversary with Impostor | PEP.ph". www.pep.ph.
- abs-cbn.com
- "Impostor receives gold medal for being nominated at the International Emmy Awards | PEP.ph". www.pep.ph.
- "PHR Presents - Midnight Phantom :: ABS-CBN.com". Archived from the original on 2010-12-06.
- Precious Hearts Romances Presents Midnight Phantom relates story of love, betrayal, and revenge | PEP.ph
