= Araw Gabi =

2018 Philippine television drama series

- Title card
- Also known as: The Secrets of El Paraiso
- Genre: Melodrama; Romance
- Created by: Willy Laconsay
- Based on: El Paraiso by Martha Cecilia
- Written by: Mary Rose Colindres; Jose Ruel L. Garcia; Margarette Heba Labrador; Michael Bryan Transfiguracion
- Directed by: Theodore C. Boborol; Myla Ajero-Gaite; Don M. Cuaresma; Roderick P. Lindayag
- Starring: JM de Guzman; Barbie Imperial
- Opening theme: "Araw-Araw, Gabi-Gabi" by Klarisse de Guzman and Michael Pangilinan / Vina Morales
- Country of origin: Philippines
- Original language: Filipino
- No. of episodes: 119

Production
- Executive producer: Katrina C. Juban
- Production locations: Batangas City, Philippines; Morong, Bataan, Philippines; Manila, Philippines
- Editor: Alexces Megan M. Abarquez
- Running time: 20–30 minutes
- Production company: RSB Unit

Original release
- Network: ABS-CBN
- Release: April 30 – October 12, 2018

Related
- Precious Hearts Romances Presents

Araw Gabi (International title: The Secrets of El Paraiso / transl. Day Night) is a 2018 Philippine television drama series broadcast by ABS-CBN. The series is based on the Filipino pocket book novel El Paraiso by Martha Cecilia, the series is the nineteenth installment of Precious Hearts Romances Presents. Directed by Theodore C. Boborol, Myla Ajero-Gaite, Don M. Cuaresma, Roderick P. Lindayag, it stars JM de Guzman and Barbie Imperial. It aired on the network's Kapamilya Gold line up and worldwide on TFC from April 30 to October 12, 2018.

It is the 18th installment of the Precious Hearts Romances Presents series, six years after Paraiso in 2012. The network decided to reboot the franchise under RSB Unit.

The drama is JM de Guzman's fifth appearance and his first lead role in the Precious Hearts Romances Presents after having played supporting roles in The Substitute Bride, Midnight Phantom, Kristine, and Alyna. The drama is also Barbie Imperial's first lead role; she previously appeared with de Guzman on All of Me in 2015.

== Synopsis ==
Mich, an aspiring lass with a sunny disposition in life, meets Adrian, the ill-tempered CEO of Olvidar Group of Companies. Despite Adrian having an evil reputation, Mich still believes that Adrian is not like what the others think. Subsequently, Mich travels to El Paraiso and learns further not just about Adrian's secrets but also about her true identity and the certain lighthouse.

== Cast and characters ==
=== Protagonist ===
- JM de Guzman as Adrian Olvidar
- Barbie Imperial as Michelle "Mich/Boning" Verano-Olvidar / Anna Vida De Alegre-Olvidar

=== Antagonist ===
- Vina Morales as Celestina "Tita Celestina" De Alegre

=== Lead and main cast ===
- Rita Avila as Odessa Olvidar / Celestina De Alegre
- Ara Mina as Amanda Rodriguez / Harriet De Alegre
- Raymond Bagatsing as Virgilio De Alegre
- RK Bagatsing as Dr. David Garcia/ Dr. David De Alegre
- Jane Oineza as Amber Distrito
- Phoebe Walker as Tanya De Alegre/ Tanya Mamaril
- Victor Silayan as Francisco "Franco" Mamaril
- Ysabel Ortega as Veronica "Nica" Marcelo
- Paulo Angeles as Frederico "Red" De Alegre, Jr./ Frederico "Red" Mamaril

=== Supporting cast ===
- Arlene Muhlach as Fe Marcelo
- Eric Nicolas as Kiko Marcelo
- Joshua Colet as Isaac Rodriguez
- Jai Agpangan as Ice
- Alexa Miro as Jessica
- Ivana Alawi as Rina
- Jose Sarasola as Emil
- Vernon Hanwell as Lui
- Debbie Garcia as Armie
- Karen Toyoshima as Madge
- Mailes Kanapi as Conchita
- Nikka Valencia as April

=== Guest cast ===
- Ping Medina as Gardo Leoncio
- Josef Elizalde as Sid Romero
- Allan Paule as Lucas Rodriguez
- Margo Midwinter as Mia Tolentino
- Mark Rivera as SPO2 Demaisip
- Ian Batherson as Leo
- Ben Isaac as Paul
- Kirst Viray as Kurt
- Riva Quenery as Ariana
- Jay Gonzaga as Kidlat
- Vanessa Alariao as Becky
- Jonic Magno as Atty. De Jesus

=== Special participation ===
- Angelica Rama as young Mich / Anna Vida
- Adrian Cabido as young Adrian
- Myrtle Sarrosa as teenage Celestina
- Ethan Salvador as teenage Virgilio
- Kristine Hammond as teenage Harriet
- Carlo Lacana as teenage Lucas
- Candy Pangilinan as Emmy Reyes-Verano / Lupe Reyes
- Dennis Padilla as Alonzo Verano / Vicente Reyes
- Ana Roces as Harriet De Alegre
- Johnny Revilla as Frederico "Fred" De Alegre, Sr.
- Simon Ibarra as Armando Olvidar

== Reception ==
Kantar Media National TV Ratings (4:40PM PST)
Pilot Episode	Finale Episode	Peak	Average
15.7% April 30, 2018	19.1% October 12, 2018	19.1% October 12, 2018	14.5%

== See also ==
- List of programs broadcast by ABS-CBN
- List of ABS-CBN Studios original drama series
