= JM de Guzman =

Filipino actor and singer (born 1988)

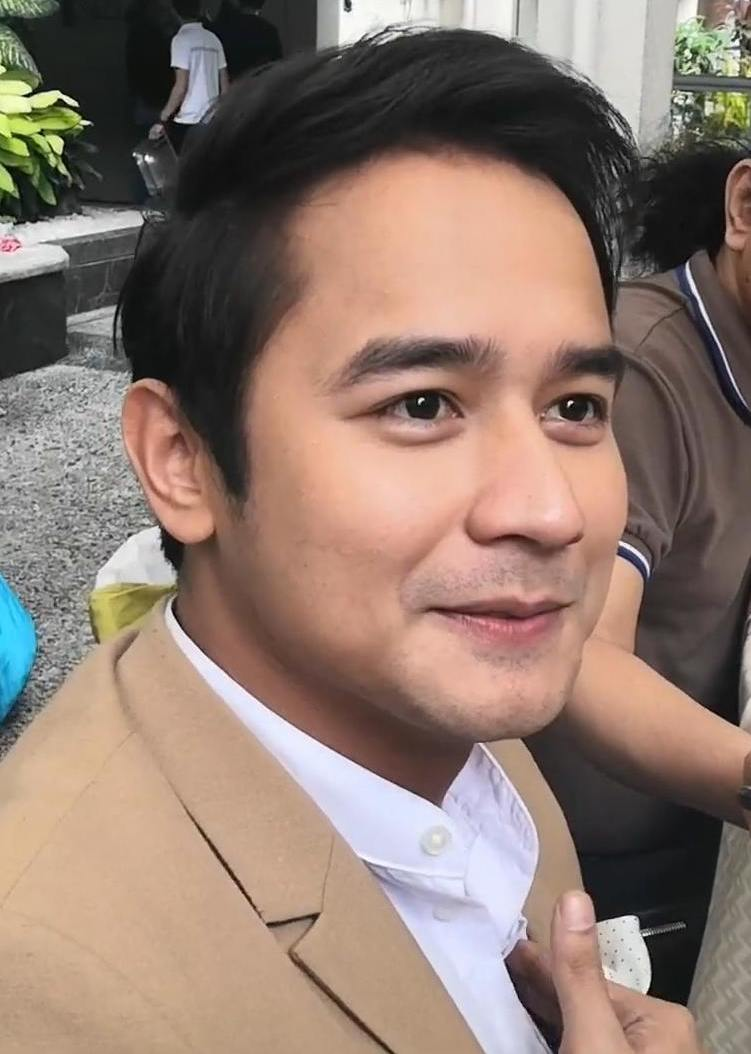
- de Guzman in 2019
- Born: Juan Miguel Gob de Guzman; September 9, 1988 (age 38); Manila, Philippines
- Other name: JM
- Occupations: Actor, singer
- Years active: 2000–present
- Agent: Star Magic (2001–present)
- Partner(s): Jessy Mendiola (2011–2013); Donnalyn Bartolome (2024–present)
- Relatives: Klarisse de Guzman (cousin)
- Musical career
- Genre: Pop
- Label: Ivory Music & Video
- Military career
- Allegiance: Philippines
- Branch: Philippine Air Force; Air Force Reserve Command
- Service years: 2020–present
- Rank: Sergeant

Juan Miguel "JM" Gob de Guzman (born September 9, 1988) is a Filipino actor, mixed martial artist, model and singer. He is currently working as an exclusive talent of Star Magic.

== Early life and career ==
Juan Miguel Gob de Guzman's mother is Han Carteciano Gob while his father is Ronniel De Guzman. JM started his career as a print and TV model. He was a cast in Ang TV 2 (as JM "Butik" de Guzman), where his batchmates include Shaina Magdayao and Denise Laurel. During his elementary and high school years, he studied at Lourdes School of Quezon City.

In 2005, he was accepted at the University of the Philippines in Diliman, where he took up Certificate in Theater Arts, majoring in Performance Studies. He apprenticed as an actor and production staff under the university's college-based theater group, Dulaang UP.

In 2006, he joined the UP Wrestling Club and eventually became its president and a decorated athlete. He won medals in various competitions sanctioned by the Wrestling Association of the Philippines, wherein he represented the UP Wrestling Club or the Quezon City Wrestling Team. In 2007, he won a silver medal for Quezon City during the Philippine Olympic Festival – National Capital Region qualifying round.

He also competed in amateur mixed martial arts (MMA) as representative of S.P.R.A.W.L. – MMA Team. He logged a 1–1 fight record: he lost his match in the 2007 URCC University and won in the 2009 S.P.R.A.W.L and BRAWL amateur MMA event.

He was also elected as the Deputy Grand Triskelion of the Tau Gamma Phi fraternity, UP Diliman chapter.

De Guzman auditioned and was later cast in the 2009 Cinemalaya film Last Supper Number 3. The independent film was where Direk Lauren Dyogi, business unit head of ABS-CBN. Dyogi found him and asked to audition for Midnight Phantom. He passed the audition and starred as the best friend of Rafael Rosell who plays the title role.

He was cast in the new PHR series Alyna and paired with his Midnight Phantom co-actor Charee Pineda who has been claimed having chemistry by the fans.

In 2011 he was chosen to play the lead role as Gabriel Maglayon, originally played by actor Rico Yan, in ABS-CBN's 2011 remake of Mula sa Puso. Upon getting the role, De Guzman has been viewed as one of the most-promising young actors these days.

Now a contract artist of Star Magic, he played the lead role of Angelito in Angelito: Batang Ama, paired with Charee Pineda, which aired from November 2011 to April 2012. With the success of Angelito: Batang Ama, De Guzman was paired up again with Pineda for the follow-up teleserye entitled Angelito: Ang Bagong Yugto that aired from July 2012 to December 2012.

His last appearance on ABS-CBN in the 2015 romantic fantasy series All of Me with Albert Martinez, Yen Santos and Arron Villaflor. De Guzman's Star Magic talent contract expired on November 16, 2015.

After a two-year hiatus, ABS-CBN promoted de Guzman's return starting December 6, 2017, before signing his contract to Star Magic.

In February 2018, he became a member of the acoustic group ASAP Jambayan, replacing Kaye Cal who left the group after prior commitments.

In 2018, he was cast as leading man in PHR series Araw Gabi and paired with former Girltrends member Barbie Imperial who has been claimed having a strong chemistry with him, form a loveteam called "JuanBie" by fans.

On November 11, 2018, he interpreted Sa mga Bituin na Lang Ibubulong for Himig Handog 2018, composed by Kyle Raphael Borbon. However, due to sickness, he was unable to participate on the Grand Finals of Himig Handog 2018, being substituted by Jason Dy during the live finale performance on ASAP.

In 2019 he was cast as Francisco "Chico" Mabunga in the series Pamilya Ko. In 2021, he was cast and portrayed the first antagonist role as Peterson Alvarez in the series Init sa Magdamag.

He joined The Iron Heart in the second season as Brother Joseph Cruz, the religious leader of Yusebeia, one of the main antagonists-turned-protagonist of the series. He also played as another main antagonist role, Alexander Lualhati in the Amazon Prime Video series Linlang.

== Personal life ==
De Guzman is a cousin of fellow singer Klarisse de Guzman, first runner-up of The Voice of the Philippines (season 1).

In late 2013 to 2014, De Guzman underwent rehab due to drug abuse and entered a rehab facility for 17 months. Prior to that, he was in a relationship with actress Jessy Mendiola for 2 years. They broke up some time in 2013 citing De Guzman's drug abuse as the main contributor of the break-up. The premature cancellation of his show Angelito: Ang Bagong Yugto was said to be caused by De Guzman's eventual erratic behavior on set. His supposed portrayal of Pedro Calungsod for the 2013 Metro Manila Film Festival entry film Pedro Calungsod: Batang Martir was also cancelled and was replaced by actor Rocco Nacino to take on the titular role.

In late 2014, after De Guzman's completion of his rehabilitation and a hiatus for over a year, he made a showbiz comeback and rekindled his relationship with Mendiola which lasted for 5 months before breaking up for the second time. His reported problematic attitude on the set of the 2015 Metro Manila Film Festival entry Walang Forever led to his replacement in the movie by actor Jericho Rosales.

In 2015, after a series of disturbing and cryptic messages posted on his Instagram account, De Guzman later apologized and stated via Instagram post that Mendiola was not the reason for their second breakup nor she and station ABS-CBN would be blamed for his recent actions and behavior. He further claimed that he has been recently struggling with anxiety attacks, depression and bipolar disorder.

Barbie Imperial experienced a breakup with her former boyfriend, De Guzman. In May 2024, De Guzman and Donnalyn Bartolome officially confirmed they were “exclusively dating.”

== Filmography ==
=== Television series ===
Year	Title	Role	Notes	Ref.
2003	Magpakailanman: Ricky Reyes Story	Totoy Reyes		
2010	Alyna	Yael		
2010	Kristine	Nathaniel Cervantes		
2010	Midnight Phantom	Mike Castillo		
2010	The Substitute Bride	Jimmy		
2011	MMK: Balot – The Marcelito Pomoy Story	Marcelito Pomoy		
2011	Mula sa Puso	Gabriel Maglayon		
2011	MMK: Pasaporte	Jay		
2011–2012	Angelito: Batang Ama	Angelito Santos		
2012	MMK: Kurtina	Acmad		
2012	Angelito: Ang Bagong Yugto	Angelito Santos		
2014	MMK: Simcard	Joeven		
2014	Hawak Kamay	Brian Agustin		
2014	Ipaglaban Mo: Ibigay Ang Aming Karapatan	Andoy		
2015	MMK: Bota	Paul Manuel		
2015	Ipaglaban Mo: Totoong Mahal Kita	Emman		
2015–2016	All of Me	Edong / young adult Manuel Figueras		
2018	Araw Gabi	Adrian Olvidar		
2019	Ipaglaban Mo: Impostor	Cedric Valdez		
2019	MMK: Black Belt	Ramon "The Bicolano" Gonzales		
2019–2020	Pamilya Ko	Francisco "Chico" Mabunga		
2021	Init sa Magdamag	Peterson Alvarez†		
2021	MMK: Quarantine Pass	Rizaldy Faller		
2022	MMK: Loogbook	Chris		
2022	MMK: Selda	Chris		
2023	The Iron Heart	Joseph Cruz		
2023	Linlang	Alexander C. Lualhati		
2025–2026	What Lies Beneath	Lucas Santiago		
2026	My Bespren Emman	Mateo "Cho" De Jesus		
2026	Sigabo	Victor "Tigre" Zafra		

=== Television shows ===
Year	Title	Role	Notes	Ref.
2001–2002	Ang TV 2	Various roles		
2010	Banana Split	guest star		
2011–present	ASAP	Boys R Boys, ASAP Jambayan member		
2011	I Dare You	Kapamilya Challenger		
2012	Sarah G. Live	Guest Co-Host		
2015	Kapamilya, Deal or No Deal	guest contestant		

=== Film ===
Year	Title	Role	Notes	Ref.
2008	New Arrival	Miko	part of Pelikuletran (Note: Letran Short Film Festival)	
2009	Last Supper No. 3	Andoy Pamatid		
2010	My Amnesia Girl	Eric		
2010	Rekrut	Lando dela Cruz		
2010	Pendong	Juan		
2010	Miss You Like Crazy	JM Recto		
2011	Ang Babae sa Septic Tank	Bingbong		
2011	Pintakasi			
2012	Every Breath U Take	Carwash Boy		
2012	The Strangers	Crispin		
2012	Pridyider	James		
2012	Intoy Siyokoy ng Kalye Marino	Intoy		
2012	My Cactus Heart	Val		
2013	Ang Turkey Man ay Pabo Rin	Dong		
2013	On the Job	Boyet		
2014	She's Dating the Gangster		cameo	
2015	Tandem	Rex		
2015	Invisible	Rodel		
2015	You're My Boss	Gino Andres		
2015	That Thing Called Tadhana	Anthony		
2018	Kung Paano Siya Nawala	Lio		
2019	Last Fool Show	Paolo		
2019	Lucid	Xavi		
2020	U-Turn	Kevin Flores		
2020	Love Lockdown	Allan		
2023	Adik Sa'Yo	Paulo		
2023	What If	Jecs		
2023	Selda Tres			
2024	3 Days And 2 Nights In Poblacion	Javi		
2024	Guilty Pleasure			
2025	Lasting Moments	Aki		

== Discography ==
=== Studio albums ===
Artist	Album	Tracks	Year	Label
JM de Guzman	JM de Guzman	"Carried Away" "Pagdating ng Panahon" (originally by Aiza Seguerra) "Out of My League" (Stephen Speaks) "Bizarre Love Triangle" (New Order) "Collide" (Howie Day) "Kiss Me" (Sixpence None the Richer) "True" (Ryan Cabrera) "Yakap Sa Dilim" (APO Hiking Society) "Give You the World" "Sa May Bintana" (Smokey Mountain) "Nothing Compares 2 U" (The Family / Sinéad O'Connor) "Carried Away (Acoustic Version)"	2011	
JM de Guzman	Tensionado	"Akin Ka Na Lang" (originally by Itchyworms) "Don't Give Up on Us" (David Soul) "Have I Told You Lately" (Van Morrison) "Lost in Space" (Lighthouse Family) "Stupidest" "Tensionado" (Silent Sanctuary) "Terrified" (Katharine McPhee) "Warrior"	2013	Ivory Music and Video

== Awards and nominations ==
Awards and Nomination
Year	Award-giving body	Category	Nominated work	Results
2011	25th PMPC Star Awards for TV	Best Single Performance by an Actor	Maalaala Mo Kaya: Pasaporte	Nominated
2011	37th Metro Manila Film Festival	New Wave Awards for Best Actor	Pintakasi	Won
2012	36th Gawad Urian Awards	Best Actor	Ang Babae sa Septic Tank	Nominated
2012	Golden Screen Awards	Best Performance by an Actor in a Leading Role (Musical or Comedy)	Ang Babae sa Septic Tank	Nominated
2012	25th Awit Awards	Best Performance by a New Male Recording Artist	Carried Away	Nominated
2012	7th Myx Music Awards	Favorite Guest Appearance in a Music Video	Pangarap Lang Kita (by Parokya ni Edgar)	Won
2013	Golden Screen Awards	Best Performance by an Actor in a Leading Role (Drama)	Intoy Syokoy ng Kalye Marino	Nominated
2013	37th Gawad Urian Awards	Best Actor	Intoy Syokoy ng Kalye Marino	Nominated
2015	17th Gawad PASADO Awards	PinakaPASADONG Actor	That Thing Called Tadhana	Won
2015	41st Metro Manila Film Festival	New Wave Awards for Best Actor	Tandem & Francisco Guinto, ARI: My Life with a King	Won
2016	14th Gawad Tanglaw Awards	Best Supporting Actor	Imbisibol	Won
2016	32nd PMPC Star Awards for Movies	Movie Actor of the Year	Tandem	Nominated
2016	34th FAP Luna Awards	Best Supporting Actor	Imbisibol	Nominated
2016	34th FAP Luna Awards	Best Actor	That Thing Called Tadhana	Nominated
2016	40th Gawad Urian Awards	Best Supporting Actor	Imbisibol	Nominated
2016	40th Gawad Urian Awards	Best Actor	That Thing Called Tadhana	Nominated
2018	LionhearTV RAWR Awards	The Great Comeback		Won
2018	32nd PMPC Star Awards for Television	Best Drama Actor	Precious Hearts Romances Presents: Araw Gabi	Nominated
2019	33rd PMPC Star Awards for Television	Best Drama Actor	Precious Hearts Romances Presents: Araw Gabi	Nominated
2019	MOR Pinoy Music Awards	Best Male Artist of the Year	Sa Bituin Nalang Ibubulong	Nominated
2019	MOR Pinoy Music Awards	OPM Revival of the Year	"214"	Nominated
	FAMAS	Best Performance by an Actor in a Leading Role	Kung Paano Siya Nawala	Nominated
2020	Gawad Tanglaw	Best Actor in a TV Series	Pamilya Ko	Won
	Gawad Pasado	Pinakapasadong Aktor ng Teleserye	Pamilya Ko	Won
2021	34th PMPC Star Awards for Television	Best Drama Actor	Pamilya Ko	Won
	TAG Awards Chicago	Best Actor	Init sa Magdamag	Won
	Asian Academy Creative Awards	National Winner Best Actor in a Leading Role	Init sa Magdamag	Won
2022	35th PMPC Star Awards for Television	Best Drama Actor	Init sa Magdamag	Won
