= Impostor (TV series) =

2010 Philippine television series

- Title card
- Genre: Drama; Comedy; Horror; Romance
- Created by: Martha Cecilia
- Based on: Impostor by Martha Cecilia
- Directed by: Jerome C. Pobocan
- Starring: Sam Milby; Maja Salvador; Melai Cantiveros; Jason Francisco; Precious Lara Quigaman
- Opening theme: "Kung Ako na Lang Sana" by Vina Morales
- Country of origin: Philippines
- Original language: Filipino
- No. of episodes: 90

Production
- Executive producer: Mark Anthony Gile
- Running time: 30-45 minutes
- Production company: Dreamscape Entertainment Television

Original release
- Network: ABS-CBN
- Release: May 17 – September 17, 2010

Impostor is a 2010 Philippine television drama romance series broadcast by ABS-CBN. The series is based on the Filipino pocket book novel of the same title created by Martha Cecilia, the series is tenth installment of Precious Hearts Romances Presents. Directed by Jerome C. Pobocan, it stars Sam Milby, Maja Salvador, Melai Cantiveros, Jason Francisco and Precious Lara Quigaman. It aired on the network's Hapontastic line up and worldwide on TFC from May 17 to September 17, 2010, replacing Precious Hearts Romances Presents: Love Me Again and was replaced by Precious Hearts Romances Presents: Alyna.

This is about people who got into an accident and end up changing faces.

This series is currently streaming online on Jeepney TV's YouTube Channel every 3:00 pm and 3:30 pm, replacing Bud Brothers.

== Synopsis ==
The story revolves around a young provincial woman named Devin. Devin believes that she was given an unusual face that no man would ever want. She envies women such as Mariz who is unhappily married to Anthony, who is her crush. Little does Devin know that Popoy, her childhood friend, has feelings for her. One day, both Devin and Mariz are involved in the same car accident. Mariz dies while Devin is able to live. Devin was given a choice to be able to live by a plastic surgeon named Monique Benitez, but in the face of Mariz. Devin agreed and was implanted with Mariz's face.

Devin is now confused about how to live her new life after leaving Popoy and her poor life behind and starting a new life with a new beautiful face with the man of her dreams.

== Cast and characters ==
=== Main cast ===
- Sam Milby as Anthony Florencio
- Maja Salvador as Mariz Benitez-Florencio / Devina "Devin" Ventura
- Melai Cantiveros as Devina "Devin" Ventura / Mariz Florencio
- Jason Francisco as Popoy Calantiao
- Precious Lara Quigaman as Monique Benitez

=== Supporting cast ===
- Jon Avila as Julio Cabrera
- Izzy Canillo as Joshua Florencio
- Long Mejia as Nestor Ventura
- Yayo Aguila as Lira Aguilar-Ventura
- Bobby Andrews as Leo Serrano
- Menggie Cobarrubias as Don Manuel Aguilar
- Racquel Villavicencio as Donya Valeria Florencio
- Kitkat as Anita
- Cacai Bautista as Bettina
- Lollie Mara as Donya Cecilia Aguilar
- Ching Arellano as Tatay Cosme

=== Guest cast ===
- Gerard Pizzaras as Mariz and Monique's father
- Gee-Ann Abrahan as Mariz and Monique's mother
- Jairus Aquino as Young Anthony
- Phebe Kay Arbontante as Young Mariz
- Cherry Lou as Young Valeria Florencio
- Arnold Reyes as Young Alejandro Florencio
- Manuel Chua as Young Valeria Florencio's lover
- Melai Cantiveros (2nd girl) as Liza (appeared at the last episode)

== Awards and nominations ==
Impostor earned a gold medal for the Best Telenovela Category in the International Emmy Awards, along with Argentina's Contra las Cuerdas, Brazil's Destiny River and Portugal's Lacos de Sangue.

Some of the writers, including Tanya Bautista, Ruby Leah Castro, Willy Laconsay, and Rouel Montañez, are all acclaimed in the industry. The project also marked the early years of internationally acclaimed filmmaker Emille Joson, who contributed some of its dialogues.

== See also ==
- List of ABS-CBN Studios original drama series
- Precious Hearts Romances Presents
