= To Have & to Hold (Philippine TV series) =

2021 Philippine television drama series

- Title card
- Genre: Romantic drama
- Created by: Denoy Navarro-Punio
- Written by: Denoy Navarro-Punio; Loi Angel Nova; Borj Danao; Ana Aleta Nadela; Renei Dimla
- Directed by: Don Michael Perez
- Creative director: Aloy Adlawan
- Starring: Carla Abellana; Rocco Nacino; Max Collins
- Opening theme: "More than Before" by Golden Cañedo
- Country of origin: Philippines
- Original language: Tagalog
- No. of episodes: 60 (list of episodes)

Production
- Executive producer: Nieva S. Magpayo
- Cinematography: Rhino Vidanes
- Editors: Mark Anthony Vallederama; Robert Reyes
- Camera setup: Multiple-camera setup
- Running time: 24–34 minutes
- Production company: GMA Entertainment Group

Original release
- Network: GMA Network
- Release: September 27 – December 17, 2021

To Have & to Hold is a 2021 Philippine television drama romance series broadcast by GMA Network. Directed by Don Michael Perez, it stars Carla Abellana, Rocco Nacino and Max Collins. It premiered on September 27, 2021, on the network's Telebabad line up. The series concluded on December 17, 2021, with a total of 60 episodes.

The series is streaming online on YouTube.

== Cast and characters ==
Cast

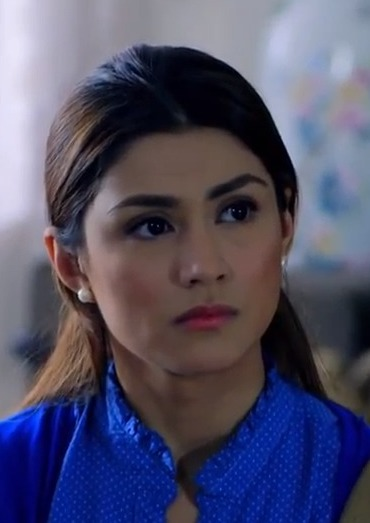
Carla Abellana

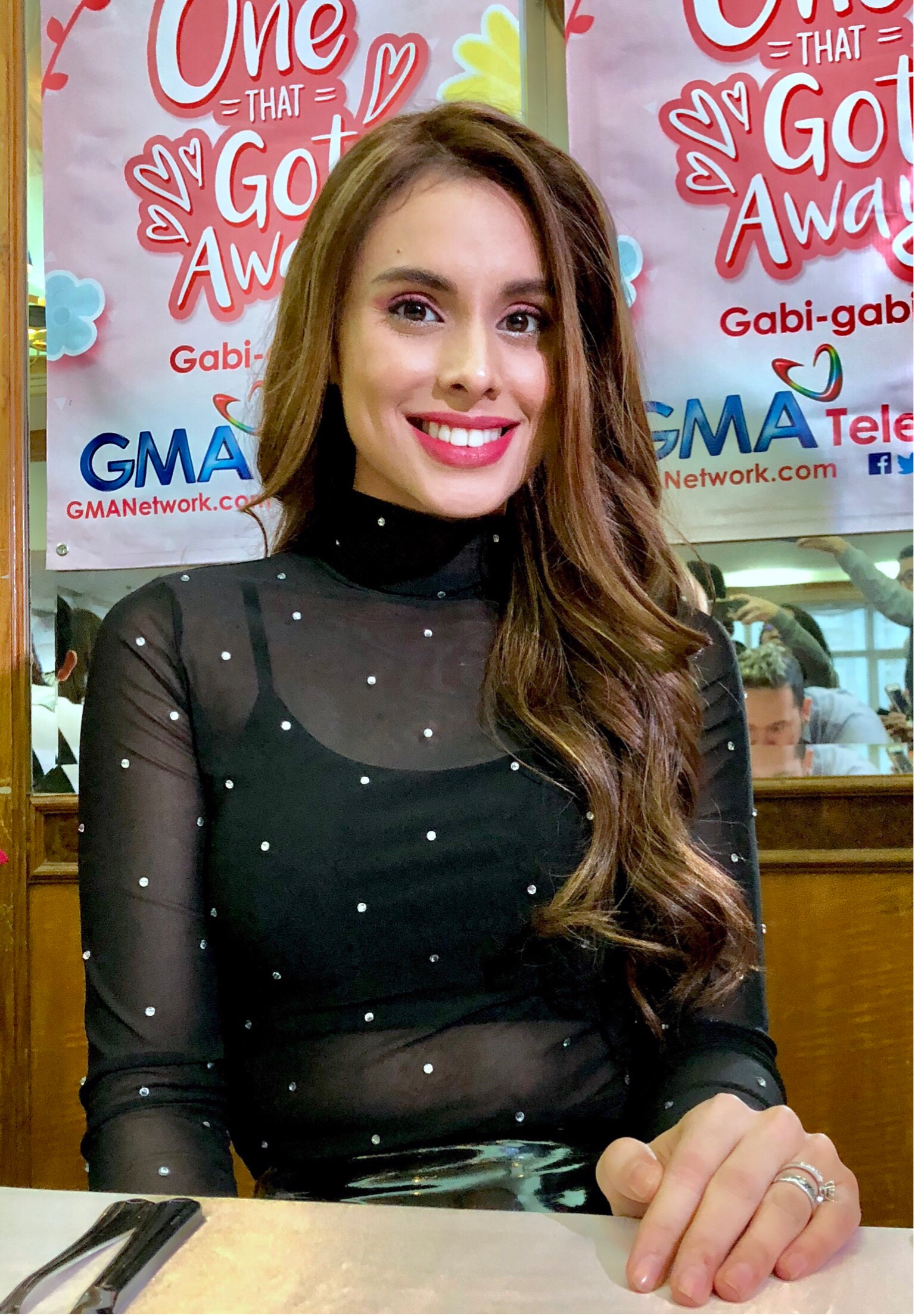
Max Collins

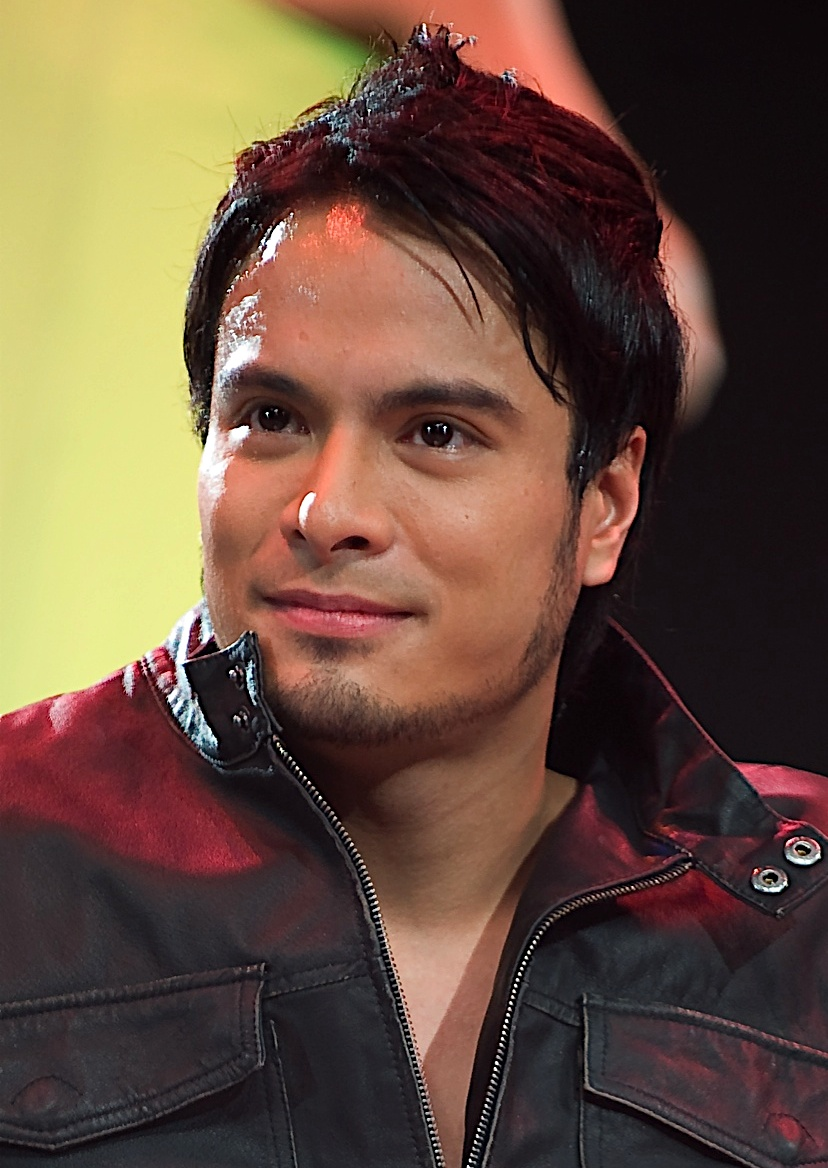
Rafael Rosell

Lead cast

- Carla Abellana as Erica Pineda-Gatchalian
- Rocco Nacino as Gavin Ramirez
- Max Collins as Dominique "Dom" Garcia-Ramirez

Supporting cast

- Roi Vinzon as Giovanni Ramirez
- Ina Feleo as Raquel "Quel" Asuncion
- Valeen Montenegro as Sofia Carlos
- Bing Pimentel as Carmelita "Millet" Ramirez
- Gilleth Sandico as Victoria "Vicky" Pineda
- Luis Hontiveros as Daryl Manabal
- Athenah Madrid as Grace "Gracie" Ramirez-Manabal

Guest cast

- Rafael Rosell as Timothy "Tony" Gatchalian
- Dion Ignacio as Ian Lobangco
- JC Tan as Jeremy Fabregas
- Kevin Sagra as Jessie
- Gerick Manalo as Dino

== Casting ==
Actor Derek Ramsay was initially hired to appear in the series as Gavin Ramirez. In May 2021, Ramsay was replaced by Rocco Nacino.

== Production ==
Principal photography commenced in May 2021. It was halted in August 2021 due to the community quarantine imposed in the National Capital Region in response to the COVID-19 pandemic.

== Ratings ==
According to AGB Nielsen Philippines' Nationwide Urban Television Audience Measurement People in television homes, the pilot episode of To Have & to Hold earned a 9.5% rating.
