= Paw Diaz =

Filipino actress (born 1987)

- Born: Amparo Quintos Posadas; March 16, 1987 (age 39); San Pedro, Laguna, Philippines
- Occupation: Actress
- Years active: 2004–2011, 2022
- Agent: Star Magic (2004–2011)

Amparo Quintos Posadas-Sandoval (born March 16, 1987), better known by her stage name as Paw Diaz is a Filipino former actress. She came to mainstream attention when she joined ABS-CBN's reality artist search, Star Circle Quest, where she emerged as a finalist.

== Career ==
Diaz came to mainstream attention when she joined ABS-CBN's reality artist search, Star Circle Quest, where she emerged as a finalist.

She is known for doing afternoon dramas in supporting or special participation roles and became the lead role as Wilda Abrantes in the 2010 mini-afternoon series of Precious Hearts Romances Romance-Drama fiction author Martha Cecila in The Substitute Bride opposite Rafael Rosell. Her biggest break was playing the 1996 antagonist Soraya Montenegro who was originally portrayed by Character Actress Itatí Cantoral in the Remake Mexican International Television Hit Maria la del Barrio to the lead character with the title name portrayed by Erich Gonzales and originally played by Mexican Queen of Entertainment and Telenovela's Thalia, which aired on the primetime slot in 2011.

She recently staged a brief comeback by landing a role in the Singaporean web series Asian Billionaires.

== Filmography ==
=== Film ===
- Can This Be Love - Ria (2005)
- All About Love
- Eternity - Lilay (2006)
- Paano Kita Iibigin - Maureen (2007)
- In My Life (2009) as Cherry Salvacion
- Pak! Pak! My Dr. Kwak! (2011) as Doctor Diaz

=== Television ===
Year	Title	Role
2004	Star Circle National Teen Quest	Herself/Contestant
2005	My Juan and Only	Sandra
2005	Ang Panday	Dahlia
2005	Maynila	-
2006	Qpids	-
2006	Da Adventures of Pedro Penduko	Cecile
2006	Sound Connections	Host
2006	Star Magic Presents: "The Game of Love"	Kat
2007	Rounin	Solana
2007	Teens	Host
2007	Sineserye Presents: Natutulog Ba ang Diyos?	Karla
2008	My Girl	-
2009	Tayong Dalawa	Michaela
2009	Precious Hearts Romances Presents: Bud Brothers	Madonna Rivera
2010	Magkano ang Iyong Dangal?	Diane
2010	Banana Split	Secondary Cast
2010	Precious Hearts Romances Presents: The Substitute Bride	Wilda Albantes (Lead Role)
2010	Maalaala Mo Kaya: Bus	Tina
2010	Rosalka	Lucy
2011	Your Song Presents: Kim	Nadine Romano
2011	Maria la del Barrio	Soraya Montenegro

=== Men's Magazine Covergirl ===
- FHM Philippines - August 2009
