= List of programs distributed by ABS-CBN Studios =

The following is a list of programs distributed by ABS-CBN Studios, a Philippine television network and production company owned by ABS-CBN Corporation. It is headquartered at ABS-CBN Broadcasting Center, Diliman, Quezon City. All programs are currently syndicated to various television networks and streaming platforms.

== Current original programming ==
Currently original programming as of October 5, 2026

Drama

- Sigabo (2026–present)
- Someone, Someday (2026–present)
- The Loyalty Game (2026–present)

Variety

- It's Showtime (2009–present)
- ASAP XP (1995–present)

Game

- Kapamilya, Deal or No Deal (2006–2016, 2026–present)
- Everybody, Sing! (2021–present)

Talk

- Y Speak 2.0 (2004–2010, 2026–present)

Live-Gap programs

- It's Showtime: Online Ü (2018–present)

News

- TV Patrol (1987–present)
- TV Patrol Weekend (2004–present)
- News Patrol (2005–present)
- The World Tonight (1966–1972, 1986–1999, 2020–present)
- TV Patrol Express (2024–present)

Documentary

- S.O.C.O.: Scene of the Crime Operatives (2005–2020; 2026–present)

Magazine

- Rated Korina (2004–2020, 2021–present)
- Tao Po! (2023–present)

Informative

- My Puhunan: Kaya Mo! (2013–2015, 2015–2020, 2023–present)

== Current online-based programming ==
=== Reality ===
Title	Original premiere date	Network / Platform	Start date	Length
Bida Star (Note: Distributed by Kumu.)	February 28, 2021	TFC	February 28, 2021–present	1 hour
The Gaming House	September 25, 2021	Kapamilya Online Live (Note: Kapamilya Online Live YouTube feed only.)	September 25, 2021–present	30 minutes
The Gaming House	September 25, 2021	iWantTFC	September 25, 2021–present	30 minutes

=== Musical ===
Title	Original premiere date	Network / Platform	Start date	Length
The Music Room	September 7, 2021	YouTube	September 7, 2021–present	

=== Talk ===
Title	Original premiere date	Network / Platform	Start date	Length
SeenZone (Note: Part of For Your Entertainment (FYE).)	April 8, 2021	TFC	June 18, 2021–present	30 minutes

=== Digital program ===
Title	Original premiere date	Network / Platform	Start date	Length
Chikatitas	September 19, 2021	YouTube	September 19, 2021–present	
Feel at Home	May 7, 2021	Kumu	May 7, 2021–present	
Kumunsulta	Match 1, 2021	Kumu	Match 1, 2021–present	
Kumunsulta	Match 1, 2021	Facebook	Match 1, 2021–present	
Kumunsulta	Match 1, 2021	YouTube	Match 1, 2021–present	
Laugh Laban	September 24, 2021	Kumu	September 24, 2021–present	1 hour
Laugh Laban	September 24, 2021	Kapamilya Online Live	September 24, 2021–present	1 hour
Pamilya Talk	January 4, 2021	Kumu	January 4, 2021–present	
Pamilya Talk	January 4, 2021	Facebook	January 4, 2021–present	
Pamilya Talk	January 4, 2021	YouTube	January 4, 2021–present	
Pinoy Vibes	March 7, 2021	Kumu	March 7, 2021–present	
Pinoy Vibes	March 7, 2021	Facebook	March 7, 2021–present	
Pinoy Vibes	March 7, 2021	YouTube	March 7, 2021–present	
The Best Talk	March 20, 2021	Kumu	March 20, 2021–present	
The Best Talk	March 20, 2021	Facebook	March 20, 2021–present	
The Best Talk	March 20, 2021	YouTube	March 20, 2021–present	
Tita Talk	March 4, 2021	Kumu	March 4, 2021–present	
Tita Talk	March 4, 2021	Facebook	March 4, 2021–present	
Tita Talk	March 4, 2021	YouTube	March 4, 2021–present	
Topsilog	January 24, 2021	Facebook	January 24, 2021–present	
Topsilog	January 24, 2021	YouTube	January 24, 2021–present	

=== Religious ===
Title	Original premiere date	Network / Platform	Start date	Length
Kapamilya Journeys of Hope	April 12, 2020	iWantTFC	April 12, 2020–present	30 minutes
Kapamilya Journeys of Hope	April 12, 2020	Jeepney TV	April 12, 2020–present	30 minutes
Kapamilya Journeys of Hope	April 12, 2020	Metro Channel	April 12, 2020–present	30 minutes
Kapamilya Journeys of Hope	April 12, 2020	TFC	April 12, 2020–present	30 minutes
Kapamilya Journeys of Hope	April 12, 2020	Kapamilya Channel	April 1, 2023–present	30 minutes
Kumustahan with Fr. Tito Caluag	February 7, 2021	iWantTFC	February 7, 2021–present	45 minutes
Kumustahan with Fr. Tito Caluag	February 7, 2021	TFC	February 7, 2021–present	45 minutes

== See also ==
- List of programs broadcast by ABS-CBN
- List of ABS-CBN Studios original drama series
