= Sabado Nights =

1995 comedy drama film by Romy V. Suzara

- Directed by: Romy Suzara
- Screenplay by: Frank G. Rivera
- Story by: Chris Millado
- Produced by: Eric M. Cuatico
- Starring: Ina Raymundo; Michelle Parton; Pia Pilapil
- Cinematography: Ricardo Remias
- Edited by: Joyce Bernal
- Music by: Jessie Lasaten
- Production company: Neo Films
- Distributed by: Neo Films
- Release date: December 14, 1995
- Running time: 103 minutes
- Country: Philippines
- Language: Filipino

Sabado Nights is a 1995 Philippine comedy drama film directed by Romy Suzara. The film stars Ina Raymundo, Michelle Parton and Pia Pilapil. It is based on the 1995 television commercial of San Miguel Beer.

== Plot ==
The film revolves around the lives of Rina (Ina), a liberated girl who engages in a relationship of three men at the same time; Mindy (Pia), a photojournalist who is involved with a lesbian but later gives up the affair in order to conceive a baby with just any man; and Shiela (Michelle), a family breadwinner who runs away with a taxi driver.

The girly trio would soon face a problem when they experienced AIDS-like symptoms shortly after their respective sexual encounters. To prove they came clean, they submitted themselves to an AIDS test.

== Cast ==
- Ina Raymundo as Rina
- Michelle Parton as Shiela
- Pia Pilapil as Mindy
- Matthew Mendoza as Marty
- Anthony Cortez as Edgar
- Lander Vera-Perez as Renzo
- Paolo Abrera as Mok Mok
- Jessica Rodriguez as Jessica
- Dexter Doria as Shiela's Mom
- Shintaro Valdez as Jan
- Bobby Andrews as Jerome
- Gino Ilustre as Anton
