= Lumayo Ka Man sa Akin =

2012 Philippine drama television series

- Title card
- Genre: Drama; Romance
- Created by: ABS-CBN Studios
- Based on: Pangako by Martha Cecilia
- Written by: Jaja Amarillo; Michael Bernaldez; Ruby Leah Castro; Clarissa Estuar; Katski Flores; Ruel Montañez; Eduardo Roy, Jr.
- Directed by: Katski M. Flores; Toto Natividad
- Starring: Maja Salvador; Jason Abalos; Patrick Garcia
- Opening theme: "Lumayo Ka Man sa Akin" by Liezel Garcia
- Composers: Rodel Naval, Mariya Takeuchi, Vehnee Saturno
- Country of origin: Philippines
- Original language: Tagalog
- No. of episodes: 73

Production
- Executive producers: Carlo Katigabk; Cory Vidanes; Laurenti Dyogi; Ruel Bayani
- Producer: Katrina Juban
- Cinematography: Michael John David; Patrick Layugan; Jesse Leano; Dan Villegas
- Editors: Gilbrad Guifaya; Jake Maderazo; Michael Marinas; Russel Martinez; Jeffrey Panlilio; Cathryn Jerry Perez; Roman Rodriguez III
- Running time: 33 minutes

Original release
- Network: ABS-CBN
- Release: January 23 – May 4, 2012

Lumayo Ka Man sa Akin (International title: Even If You Go Away from Me) is a 2012 Philippine television drama series broadcast by ABS-CBN. The series is based on the Filipino pocket book novel Pangako created by Martha Cecilia, the series is the fifteenth installment of Precious Hearts Romances Presents. Directed by Katski M. Flores and Toto Natividad, it stars Maja Salvador, Jason Abalos and Patrick Garcia. It aired on the network's Kapamilya Gold line up and worldwide on TFC from January 23 to May 4, 2012, replacing Reputasyon and was replaced by Aryana.

The series was streaming online on YouTube.

== Story ==
Janine del Castillo is one of Cebu's most promising interior designers. She is engaged to Matthew de Vega, a handsome lawyer from a rich family. She seems to have a perfect life, until she finds out that her father has a terminal disease. He finally admits to Janine that she is the product of an illicit affair, and his dying wish is for her to meet her mother.

In Manila, some twenty years ago, Maurice fell in love with a woman named Consuelo, who worked in the home depot he owned. While applying for that job, Consuelo concealed the truth - that she is married and already had a daughter in Quezon - to have a better chance of being hired. Eventually, Consuelo fell for Maurice and this produced a love child, Janine. Consuelo became overcome by guilt so she left Maurice and Janine to return to her family.

After Maurice's death, Janine goes to a rural barrio in Quezon to find her mother. Here she encounters copra farm owner Jake Falcon - a brash, self-confident man oozing with sex appeal. Janine's guarded nature immediately clashes with Jake's macho, devil-may-care attitude. An attraction and unspoken sexual tension develop between them.

Janine meets Consuelo in the transient house that she runs with her husband Anselmo and their daughter Karla. Janine pretends to be a student on a research trip and rents a room from them to be able to stay close to her mother.

Janine finds it difficult to find the right timing to tell Consuelo about her true identity. She ends up staying in Quezon for a longer time than she originally intended. Circumstances keep causing her to bump into Jake, and soon, she realizes that she is developing strong feelings towards him. She feels comfortable to be herself with Jake, something that she never felt with Matthew. Things get complicated with the arrival of Matthew. He wants Janine to leave Quezon with him. But Janine is undecided: she still wants a closure with Consuelo, and she is now secretly in love with Jake. Jake tells Janine that he isn't going to give up on her so easily. This leads to a passionate sexual encounter.

Janine finally decides that she wants to be with Jake, but her happiness is cut short when she finds out that her half-sister Karla is pregnant - and Jake is the father. Janine knows she can never live with herself if she deprives the unborn child of its father, so she urges Jake to do the right thing. Janine decides to leave Quezon, but before she does, she has a talk with Consuelo who had figured out that she is her long-lost daughter. They agree to keep in touch even though they're far away.

Back in Cebu, Janine tells Matthew all that has transpired. She wants to be fair to him, so she breaks the engagement. Eventually, Matthew wins her back. In the meantime, Jake does everything to be a good husband and father to Karla and their baby. A tragedy forces Janine and Matthew to return to Quezon.

Eventually, Jake and Janine's feelings are rekindled, and Matthew notices this. Matthew becomes possessive in his jealousy. Janine wants to remain faithful to him, but being with Matthew not only stifles her but starts crushing her spirit.

Janine realizes that soon, she will have to make a choice. Should she continue honoring her commitment to the man she is supposed to marry, or will she let herself find happiness in a man who loves her selflessly and lets her feel free?

== Cast and characters ==
=== Main cast ===
- Maja Salvador as Janine del Castillo
- Jason Abalos as Jake Falcon
- Patrick Garcia as Matthew de Vega

=== Supporting cast ===
- Ina Feleo as Karla Cordero-Falcon
- Ina Raymundo as Consuelo Cordero
- Toby Alejar as Anselmo Cordero
- Kathleen Hermosa as Angela
- Miko Palanca as Greg
- Jamilla Obispo as Pinpin Dimaano
- John Arcilla as Juanito Falcon
- Bettina Carlos as Ali
- Guji Lorenzana as Neil
- Marlann Flores as Leila
- Joshua Colet as Stefano

=== Extended cast ===
- Raye Baquirin as Edna
- Robin Tolentino as Don
- Jordan Hong as Antonio
- Jef Gaitan as Marla

=== Special participation ===
- Kyline Alcantara as Young Janine
- Julio Pisk as Young Matthew
- Angelina Canapi as Sandra de Vega
- Ariel Rivera as Maurice del Castillo

== Production ==
Lumayo Ka Man Sa Akin is not available in all ABS-CBN Regional Network Group (now ABS-CBN Regional) channels due to local versions of TV Patrol on the same timeslot. Instead a replay of recent broadcasts are shown the next day mostly Tuesdays-Saturdays on its Morning block.

This is also Patrick Garcia's first project with his comeback to the network after 6 years.

== See also ==
- List of programs broadcast by ABS-CBN
- List of ABS-CBN Studios original drama series
- Precious Hearts Romances Presents
