= Denise Laurel =

Filipino actress and singer

- Born: Denise María Sanz Laurel; September 30, 1987 (age 39); Manila, Philippines
- Occupations: Actress, singer
- Years active: 2001–present
- Agent(s): Star Magic (2001; 2006–present); GMA Network (2002–2006; 2024–present)
- Partner: Sol Mercado (2014–2016)
- Children: 1
- Relatives: Jose P. Laurel (great-grandfather); Pacencia Laurel (great-grandmother); Salvador Laurel (grandfather)
- Family: Laurel

Denise María Sanz Laurel (born September 30, 1987) is a Filipino actress and singer. She is of Filipino and Spanish descent. She is a granddaughter of former Philippines vice president Salvador Laurel and great-granddaughter of former president José P. Laurel on her father's side, while on her mother's side, she is the great-granddaughter of Don Francisco "Paco" Sanz, former governor of Romblon and Palawan. She is best known for her roles in various ABS-CBN dramas, such as the Precious Hearts Romances series' Midnight Phantom and Kristine, Dahil sa Pag-ibig, Annaliza and most recently Nasaan Ka Nang Kailangan Kita. She was also the grand winner of the second season of the Philippine edition of Your Face Sounds Familiar. Laurel is a member of Star Magic and is also concurrently a GMA Network artist.

== Personal life ==
Laurel is the granddaughter of former Philippine Vice President Salvador Laurel and Celia Díaz and the great-granddaughter of former President José P. Laurel. She is the youngest daughter of David Laurel and Ruby Sanz. She has a son named Alejandro born in 2011.

Laurel became engaged to professional basketball player Sol Mercado in March 2014. However, on October 20, 2016, Laurel announced through her Instagram account that they had ended their relationship.

== Career ==
Laurel started at 6 in a musical theater for Repertory Philippines. She was discovered by Johnny Manahan at 9 and was later given a break to be part of Ang TV 2. She played Ina Raymundo's daughter in Pangako Sa ‘Yo.

She then made a name in Singapore when she was part of MTV Asia's Rouge, which was shown all over Asia. Among the many who auditioned, she stood out and got the role of a smart lead vocalist named Pat. At the age of 16, her experience in working with other nationalities taught her things that helped her improve her craft. After a season in Rouge, Laurel decided to concentrate on her local showbiz career.

After her return to the Philippines, she was part of the teen-oriented show Click, TAPE Inc.'s Walang Hanggan and Leya, and two telefantasya's Mulawin and Encantadia.

She went back to ABS-CBN, and starred in Abt Ur Luv, and in the fifth season of Komiks, where she played an engkantao. In 2008, ABS-CBN started the Precious Hearts Romances Presents series in which Laurel was prominently featured. Thus far, she had starred in four of the series' adaptations: Bud Brothers, You're Mine, Only Mine, Midnight Phantom and Kristine. She started getting recognition when she did the series, most notably in Midnight Phantom and Kristine opposite her friend Rafael Rosell. Her team-up with Rosell had been a hit with the viewers, thus they were teamed up again in Dahil sa Pag-ibig. After Dahil sa Pag-ibig, Laurel starred in her fifth PHR series entitled Pintada, where she played a teacher with a mysterious past.

In 2013, Laurel played an antagonist role in the last PHR series Paraiso, and later became part of the pre-primetime family drama series Annaliza that was aired until March 2014, portraying Isabel. She starred in the afternoon melodrama series Nasaan Ka Nang Kailangan Kita in 2015. The said series was set to replace Faith in the first quarter of the year on primetime, but it instead was an afternoon program. On the same year after NKNKK, Laurel auditioned for the 2nd season of Your Face Sounds Familiar, where she would go on to be titled as the grand winner.

In 2025, she went back to GMA Network to play a major role as Divina Williams, the ultimate villain in Prinsesa ng City Jail.

== Filmography ==
=== Film ===
| Year | Title | Role |
|---|---|---|
| 2006 | First Day High | Tuesday |
| 2008 | For the First Time | Billie |
| 2008 | Shake, Rattle & Roll X | Emily |
| 2009 | Ang Darling Kong Aswang | Beta |
| 2010 | My Amnesia Girl | Cameo Appearance (as Perfectionist) |
| 2012 | Si Agimat, si Enteng Kabisote at si Ako | Lakasta |
| 2014 | Third Eye | Janet |
| 2016 | Magtanggol | Atty. Susan Del Rosario |
| 2016 | The Unmarried Wife | Louise |
| 2019 | Man and Wife | Mimi |

=== Television ===
| Year | Title | Role |
|---|---|---|
| 2001 | Ang TV 2 | Herself |
| 2001 | Pangako Sa 'Yo | Chammy Guttenberg |
| 2001–2002 | Side Stitch | |
| 2002 | Wansapanataym: Suklay ni Lola Lilay | Jane |
| 2002–2003 | Match TV | Herself |
| 2004 | Rouge | Pat |
| 2004 | Magpakailanman: Tukso ng Tadhana | Eva's Sister |
| 2004 | Leya, ang Pinakamagandang Babae sa Ilalim ng Lupa | Kathleen |
| 2004 | Mulawin | Lawiswis |
| 2004 | Click | Bea |
| 2005 | Encantadia | Marge |
| 2006 | Maging Sino Ka Man | Kalayaan "Kalay" |
| 2006 | Star Magic Presents: Tender, Loving, Care | Dianne |
| 2006 | Star Magic Presents: Abt Ur Luv | Celine Lagrimas |
| 2007 | Maalaala Mo Kaya: Airport | Chippy Impreso |
| 2007 | Komiks Presents: Si Pedro Penduko at ang mga Engkantao | Dianne |
| 2007 | Sineserye Presents: Natutulog Ba Ang Diyos? | Trish Crisostomo |
| 2007 | Prinsesa ng Banyera | Teen Virgie |
| 2007 | Maalaala Mo Kaya: Tren | Liezel Ferrer |
| 2007 | Your Song: Wala Ng Hahanapin Pa | Yanna |
| 2008 | Maalaala Mo Kaya: Botelya | Annette |
| 2008 | Rakista | CC |
| 2009 | Precious Hearts Romances Presents: Bud Brothers | Corazon "Coco" Artiaga |
| 2009 | Midnight DJ | Tina Garena |
| 2009 | Studio 23 | VJ / Herself |
| 2010 | Precious Hearts Romances Presents: You're Mine, Only Mine | Roxanne Bernardo |
| 2010 | Sunsilk Hair Is Your Moment | Marga |
| 2010 | Precious Hearts Romances Presents: Midnight Phantom | Nadja Ann Dela Merced |
| 2010–2011 | Precious Hearts Romances Presents: Kristine | Kristine Emerald Fortalejo |
| 2011 | Maalaala Mo Kaya: Tinapay | Evelyn |
| 2011 | Wansapanataym: Hulog ng Langit | Guardian Angel |
| 2012 | Dahil sa Pag-ibig | Wendy Garcia |
| 2012 | Precious Hearts Romances Presents: Pintada | Lysa Alvarez |
| 2012–2013 | Precious Hearts Romances Presents: Paraiso | Cassandra Romano |
| 2013–2014 | Annaliza | Isabel Garcia Benedicto / Isabel Garcia Querubin |
| 2013–2014 | Maalaala Mo Kaya: Pasa | Blythe |
| 2014 | Ipaglaban Mo: Bumalik ka sa kanyang kabit | Nila |
| 2015 | Nasaan Ka Nang Kailangan Kita | Toni Briones |
| 2015 | Maalaala Mo Kaya: Pictures | Andrea |
| 2015 | Your Face Sounds Familiar 2 | Herself / Grand Winner |
| 2016 | Ipaglaban Mo: Pagnanasa | Louie |
| 2016 | Ipaglaban Mo: Selos | Alice |
| 2017 | The Better Half | Bianca Buenaflor Saison |
| 2018 | La Luna Sangre | Soraya Laurent |
| 2018 | Maalaala Mo Kaya: Hapagkainan | Evy |
| 2018 | Sana Dalawa ang Puso | Primera Ortega |
| 2018 | Playhouse | Emily Grace L. Cortes |
| 2019 | Maalaala Mo Kaya: Mansanas | Maricar |
| 2019 | FPJ's Ang Probinsyano | Police C/Insp. (Major) Alessandra "Alex" T. Romero |
| 2019 | Ipaglaban Mo: Caregiver | Ella |
| 2019–2020 | The Haunted | Monica Mendez |
| 2020 | 24/7 | Dr. Delilah Gomez |
| 2022 | Flower of Evil | Grace Villareal |
| 2024 | It's Showtime | Guest Hurado |
| 2025 | Prinsesa ng City Jail | Divina Cruz-Williams |
| 2025 | Unang Hirit | Host / Herself |
| 2026 | Whispers from Heaven | TBA |

== Discography ==
=== Non-album songs ===
- "I Will Take You Forever" with Kris Lawrence (Christopher Cross and Frances Ruffelle cover)
- "Head Over Heels" (The Go-Go's cover)
- "My Memory of Him" (single for Endless Love: Winter Sonata)
- "If I Ain't Got You" (Alicia Keys cover)
- "Disco Lights" (Ultrabeat cover)
- "Love You Anyway" (original song)
- "Ligaw Na Bullet" (feat. Skusta Clee)

| Preceded by Melai Cantiveros | Your Face Sounds Familiar (Philippine TV series); Winner; 2015 | Succeeded by Awra Briguela |
| Preceded by Melai Cantiveros | Your Face Sounds Familiar (Philippine TV series) Regular Season; Winner; September 2015–December 2015 | Succeeded by Klarisse de Guzman |
