= Midnight Phantom (TV series) =

Television series

- Genre: Drama; Romance
- Created by: ABS-CBN Studios; Martha Cecilia
- Based on: Midnight Phantom by Martha Cecilia
- Directed by: Cathy Garcia-Molina
- Starring: Rafael Rosell; Denise Laurel; Ina Raymundo
- Opening theme: "All I Ask of You" by Raki Vega
- Country of origin: Philippines
- Original language: Filipino
- No. of episodes: 24

Production
- Executive producers: Carlo Katigbak; Cory Vidanes; Laurenti Dyogi
- Production locations: Manila, Philippines; Pangasinan, Philippines
- Running time: 30 minutes

Original release
- Network: ABS-CBN
- Release: July 12 – August 13, 2010

Midnight Phantom is a 2010 Philippine television drama romance series broadcast by ABS-CBN. The series is based on the Filipino pocket book novel of the same title created by Martha Cecilla, the series is eleventh installment of the Precious Hearts Romances Presents. Directed by Cathy Garcia-Molina, it stars Rafael Rosell, Denise Laurel and Ina Raymundo. It aired on the network's Hapontastic line up and worldwide on TFC from July 12 to August 13, 2010, and was replaced by He's Beautiful.

This also marks Ina Raymundo's comeback to the television scene after 8 years. Both Ina and Denise played a mother-daughter duo after being cast on the second book and season of Pangako Sa 'Yo in 2001.

== Summary ==
Brandon is madly in love with Anya, unknowingly that she's already in a relationship with Augusto. However, when Brandon finds about Augusto's abuse towards her, he tries to save her, only for Anya to turn her back and betray him, permanently scarring his face. After that, he vowed to never love again and becomes the "Midnight Phantom", a DJ who airs at Midnight. Years later, Brandon soon meets Nadja and they fall in love. However, he learns that she is the loving stepdaughter of his former lover. Driven by revenge, he decides to get back by hurting the young maiden, but his feelings for her become so real, even Nadja tells Anya about her encounter with Brandon, shocking her stepmother who tries to protect the child she loved and raised from the man whom she left brokenhearted. When will Nadja learn the truth about the woman she looked up to as her mother and the man she fell in love with? And how will Brandon and Anya resolve their misunderstanding to protect the young lass? Will Brandon and Nadja continue their romance or will it end with a disastrous fate because of the past?

== Cast and characters ==
=== Main cast ===
- Rafael Rosell as Brandon / Midnight Phantom - Brandon, an heir to his father's wealth, fell in love with a bar singer- Anya, who was ten years his senior. Young, and madly in love, Brandon fought for this love that scarred him physically, emotionally, mentally- for life as the woman he poured his heart for- loved another man. Ten years later, still scarred and is convinced that women can never be trusted, Brandon conceals his loneliness and heartbreak through the voice of "Midnight Phantom". His sweet words, longing for a woman to love him wholeheartedly, captivated the hearts of the hopeless romantic young women. By chance, Brandon meets the woman who made his heart beat once more, only to find out later that the young lass who made him believe in love again is the stepdaughter of the woman who shattered his heart and his life ten years ago.
- Denise Laurel as Nadja Ann dela Merced - Nadja is the heiress of a wealthy businessman. She had lost her mother first, had a step mother second, and lost her father soon after the marriage. From then on, she was raised by Anya- her step mom, as her own flesh and blood daughter, whom she loved in return. Intelligent and reserved, but crazy-beautiful at the same time, Nadja falls in love with a man she hasn't met- a mysterious DJ whose program airs at midnight. To pursue this atypical attraction, Nadja goes on a quest to discover and get to know her Midnight Phantom. Her Dream Boy returns a mutual interest, and they spend a romantic and chaotic week-long vacation, in a private, secluded island. As their romance steams up, Nadja discovers the truth behind her Dream Boy's true identity and motive- A plot for revenge.
- Ina Raymundo as Anya dela Merced - Young Anya used to be a bar singer who attracted both the widowed bar owner- Augusto, and the young band singer- Brandon. Her beauty and youth brought happiness to her marriage to Augusto and her brief romance with Brandon catapulted the young man's destruction and despair. As Augusto dies, Anya tries her best to be the mother for her late husband's unica hija- Nadja. She was the best step mom one could have- at least until the secrets locked up from her past, resurfaces to haunt her.

=== Supporting cast ===
- Charee Pineda as Karen Castillo - A fellow Midnight Phantom fan, Karen is Nadja's best friend and confidante. As Mike's sister, she becomes Nadja's crucial link to the Midnight Phantom.
- Jommy Teotico as Peter - He is one of the band members and closest friends of Brandon. He now works for Brandon's radio station and only one of the few people who knows the true identity of the Midnight Phantom.
- JM de Guzman as Mike Castillo - He is Brandon's best friend, and Karen's elder brother. He holds the key to Midnight Phantom's true identity, and Brandon's scarred past. He will be the bridge that will make Brandon, Nadja and Anya's path intersect.
- Cris Villanueva as Augusto Dela Merced - He is the bar owner where Anya sings and Brandon plays with his band. He is a widower with a little princess to raise- Nadja. He loved Anya unconditionally---accepting her past and the secrets that she keeps.
- Spanky Manikan as Don Hernando - A successful businessman, a father and a hard-liner. He wants nothing but a stable future for his son but his tough-love has hardened Brandon, causing the frequent clashes between father and son.
- Beverly Salviejo as Yaya Zeny - She had taken care of Nadja, Augusto and Anya along with their family and personal secrets. She had been a second mom to both Anya and Nadja.
- Alwyn Uytingco as Ryan - friend of Brandon who owns a bar aptly named Ryan's Bar.
- Makisig Morales as Gabriel - Anya's son with cerebral palsy

== Re-run ==
As part of the new tagline Throwback sa Umaga (Throwback in the Morning), Midnight Phantom re-aired from September 16, 2014 to October 10, 2014, weekday mornings after Naruto: Shippuden 6.

== See also ==
- Precious Hearts Romances Presents
- List of programs broadcast by ABS-CBN
- List of ABS-CBN Studios original drama series
