= You're Mine, Only Mine =

- Genre: Drama
- Based on: You're Mine, Only Mine by Martha Cecilia
- Directed by: Jerry Lopez Sineneng
- Starring: Denise Laurel; Will Devaughn
- Opening theme: "Way Back Into Love" by Sam Milby and Toni Gonzaga
- Country of origin: Philippines
- Original language: Filipino
- No. of episodes: 10

Production
- Executive producer: Laurenti Dyogi
- Running time: 30 minutes
- Production company: Star Creatives Group

Original release
- Network: ABS-CBN
- Release: March 1 – March 12, 2010

You're Mine, Only Mine is a 2010 Philippine television drama series broadcast by ABS-CBN. The series is based on the Filipino pocket book novel of the same title created by Martha Cecilla, the series is the seventh installment of Precious Hearts Romances Presents. Directed by Jerry Lopez Sinenang, it stars Denise Laurel and Will Devaughn. It aired on the network's Hapontastic line up and worldwide on TFC from March 1 to March 12, 2010, replacing Precious Hearts Romances Presents: The Substitute Bride and was replaced by Precious Hearts Romances Presents: Lumang Piso Para sa Puso.

== Plot ==
The story began when Roxanne (Denise Laurel) found out that her late father used her to pay for his own debt with his boss, Alex (Will Devaughn). Alex forced Roxanne to be his wife. What seemed at first to be an obligation will ultimately lead to true love.

== Cast and characters ==
=== Main cast ===
- Denise Laurel as Roxanne Bernardo – A bright young woman with big dreams. She hopes that her late father's Pineapple farm would soon progress and grow. She wants to help her Auntie the way she helped her and she also provides for the schooling of her sibling. When she realized that her father used her as a payment for his debt she was willing to do her obligations as a wife to Alex.
- Will Devaughn as Alex Moravilla – A hardened businessman. It's already his reputation to be ruthless when it comes to doing business. Roxanne already expected this from him but what she will learn about him will eventually be the cause for her to fall in love with Alex.

=== Supporting cast ===
- Jairus Aquino as Raymond
- Victor Basa as Antonio
- Regine Angeles as Dahlia
- Alwyn Uytingco as Robert
- Rey "PJ" Abellana as Alejandro
- Johnny Revilla as Perry
- Tanya Gomez as Pilar
- Susan Africa as Theresa

== See also ==
- Precious Hearts Romances Presents
