= Alyna =

2010–11 Philippine television drama series

- Title card
- Genre: Drama
- Created by: ABS-CBN Studios; Martha Cecilia
- Based on: My Love My Hero: Dominic by Martha Cecilia
- Written by: Artemio C. Abad; Ruby Leah Castro; Jurey Mirafuentes
- Directed by: FM Reyes; Cathy Garcia-Molina
- Starring: Shaina Magdayao; Jason Abalos; Kaye Abad; Sid Lucero; Francine Prieto
- Opening theme: "Bakit nga ba Mahal Kita?" sung by Laarni Lozada
- Country of origin: Philippines
- Original language: Filipino
- No. of episodes: 105

Production
- Executive producer: Albert B. Almaden
- Running time: 30-45 minutes
- Production company: Star Creatives

Original release
- Network: ABS-CBN
- Release: September 20, 2010 – February 11, 2011

Alyna is a Philippine television drama series broadcast by ABS-CBN. The series is based on the Filipino pocket book novel Dominic created by Martha Cecilia, the series is thirteenth installment of Precious Hearts Romances Presents. Directed by FM Reyes and Cathy Garcia-Molina, it stars Shaina Magdayao, Kaye Abad, Francine Prieto, Jason Abalos, Paul Jake Castillo, Beauty Gonzales, and Sid Lucero. It aired on the network's Hapontastic line up and worldwide on TFC from September 20, 2010, to February 11, 2011, replacing Precious Hearts Romances Presents: Impostor and was replaced by The Price is Right and I Love You So (Autumn's Concerto).

This series is currently available on Jeepney TV's YouTube channel (Not yet done, episodes 1 to 89 are only available).

== Plot ==
The series revolves around the life of the titular character, Alyna Natividad.

Alyna who, after feeling unloved and suffering from familial hardships, falls for the charismatic yet deceitful Rex Del Carmen, only for him to disappear, leaving her pregnant and heartbroken.

While searching for Rex, Alyna encounters Dominic Del Carmen, a serious and enigmatic man with whom she starts to fall in love with.

Her story becomes complicated when Rex unexpectedly returns, leaving her to choose between the man who was her first love and the man who promise to love her forever.

== Cast ==
=== Main cast ===
- Shaina Magdayao as Alyna Natividad - Alyna grew up with no family she could call her own. Following the death of her father and not long after she started living with them, Alyna was almost molested by her mother's live-in partner. Her estranged mother saved her from the abuse, but she left Alyna with multiple emotional scars to remind her that she is unwanted and that her beauty, her greatest gift, will cause her downfall.
- Jason Abalos as Dominic Del Carmen - Dominic del Carmen hails from a wealthy clan. He runs a pottery and other businesses. Strict and righteous with an unwavering sense of right and wrong, he feels an unending need to prove himself to his family and others.
- Kaye Abad as Lilet Cenarosa-Del Carmen - The oldest daughter of the Cenarosa clan. She will do everything to get Dominic's love and is the cause of Rex and Dominic's rift.
- Sid Lucero as Dexter "Rex" Del Carmen - Rex comes from an aristocratic clan in the province but opted for the indulgent life in the city. He is not accustomed to hard work because everything he wants comes to him easily—including women. Only one woman attempted to resist his charms, Alyna.
- Francine Prieto as Aida Natividad / Mira Fuentes - Alyna's mother who leaves her at the beginning of the story and falls for another man after losing comfort in Naldo. Later, Aida changes her name to Mira Fuentes and begins a secret relationship with Paco Alvaro, father of Victor. She becomes the head manager of Dominic's new job before she is shown by Alyna reunites her but rejects her. In the end, she realizes that Aida was a selfish and horrible mother to her after leaving the family. She asks Alyna for forgiveness.

=== Supporting cast ===
- Jao Mapa as Reynaldo "Naldo" Natividad - Alyna's paraplegic father. He is shown to be a devoted and loving husband to Aida and a doting father to Alyna. His death left Alyna in grief.
- Carlos Morales as Digo - Aida's live-in partner and is the reason Aida left her family. Shown to have ill will, he attempted to sexually abuse Alyna. He was eventually killed by Aida trying to defend Alyna.
- Maria Isabel Lopez as Donya Fausta Del Carmen - Rex and Dominic's Aunt. She re-claims her name as the "Queen" of Del Carmen's household even though she is adopted and not the real Del Carmen.
- Bing Davao as Paco Alvaro - who helped Alyna from a car accident and has a son, Victor. He also had a secret affair with Alyna's mother, now known as Mira Fuentes and the head manager of Dominic's new job.
- Edward Mendez as Victor Alvaro - Alyna's new love interest. He has a daughter named Sophia from his previous relationship. He thought that Alyna is the one who broke their family apart, but his hatred slowly changed to deep affection for her.
- Beauty Gonzalez as Liza Abadilla - is one of Alyna's closest friend. An honest and tough Visayan, she constantly finds herself arguing with Patrick.
- Charee Pineda as Jacqueline "Jerry" Cenarosa - Lilet's brash and boyish sister. After meeting Yael, she transforms herself from being a tomboy to a beautiful young lady. She usually finds comfort in Yael whenever she has a problem with her father.
- Dionne Monsanto as Arianna - Patrick's previous girlfriend, who attempts to ruin the Lisa and Patrick's relationships.
- Paul Jake Castillo as Patrick - Dominic and Rex's childhood friend. A veterinarian and a Mama's boy. He usually annoys Liza, but eventually falls in love with her.
- JM de Guzman as Yael - He came from a sorrowful past and took good care of his younger sister promising her to have a brighter future, but she died from epilepsy. He is also the man whom Jerry finds comfort.
- Jose Sarasola as Andrew - He is the Del Carmen's lawyer, who will do everything to protect the families wealth.
- Andrea Brillantes (credited as Blythe Gorostiza) as Sophia - Victor's daughter. She initially believed Alyna as her long lost mother because of the picture frame that she had.
- Gloria Sevilla as Susana - The loving mother of Patrick, who is a Visayan native as well.

=== Special participation ===
- Nick Lizaso as Don Menandro Cenarosa
- Mark Gil as Don Felipe Del Carmen
- Susan Africa as Donya Adela Dela Cruz-Del Carmen

== Critical reception ==
On an interview with Shaina Magdayao on The Buzz on December 19, 2010, she said that the show would be extended until February 11, 2011.

== See also ==
- Precious Hearts Romances Presents
- List of ABS-CBN Studios original drama series
