= Lumang Piso Para sa Puso =

- Genre: Drama
- Created by: ABS-CBN Studios; Vanessa
- Directed by: Laurenti Dyogi
- Starring: Kristine Hermosa; Oyo Sotto
- Opening theme: "Way Back Into Love" by Sam Milby and Toni Gonzaga
- Country of origin: Philippines
- Original language: Filipino
- No. of episodes: 13

Production
- Executive producer: Laurenti Dyogi
- Running time: 30-45 minutes
- Production company: Precious Hearts Romances

Original release
- Network: ABS-CBN
- Release: March 15 – March 31, 2010

Lumang Piso Para sa Puso (transl. Old Peso for the Heart) is a 2010 Philippine television drama series broadcast by ABS-CBN. The series is the eighth installment of Precious Hearts Romances Presents. Directed by Laurenti Dyogi, it stars Kristine Hermosa and Oyo Boy Sotto. It aired on the network's Hapontastic line up and worldwide on TFC from March 15 to March 31, 2010, replacing Precious Hearts Romances Presents: You're Mine, Only Mine and was replaced by Precious Hearts Romances Presents: Love My Again.

== Plot ==
Sandra, who is always strapped for cash, discovers an antique coin among her dead grandmother's things and decides to sell it so that she can have the roof of their beloved house repaired. She sells it to Dave, the owner of the only hobby shop in their town. It is hate at first sight for the two of them, but Sandra brushes it aside, thinking that she would never see him again anyway.

But when Sandra's grandmother starts showing up in her dreams, Sandra realized that she had offended the woman who raised her by selling one of her prized belongings. Sandra tries to buy back the coin from Dave, but he refuses because he needs the coin to complete the collection he started with his own dead father. Sandra's best friend Joan comes up with a wacky idea, to just steal the coin back.

The two women end up breaking into the shop and reclaiming the coin. Unfortunately, Dave figures out that Sandra was behind the break in and finds a way to steal back the coin. His aunt though makes him feel guilty, so he agrees to give the coin back to Sandra – if she agrees to serve as his personal maid for two weeks. As they spend more time with each other, they begin to fall in love... and not even bratty Mayor's daughter Erika or irritating suitor Konsehal Magtulis can get in their way.

== Cast and characters ==
=== Main cast ===
- Kristine Hermosa as Sandra Perez - An orphaned municipal clerk who is always strapped for cash. Sandra, who was raised by her grandmother and speaks like an old woman, has both serious / romantic side and a "kenkoy" side.
- Oyo Boy Sotto as Dave Pangilinan - The charming but childish owner of the hobby shop in their town. He's a happy-go-lucky guy and doesn't want to have too many responsibilities and doesn't like being too involved.

=== Supporting cast ===
- Niña Jose as Erika
- DJ Durano as Councilor Magtulis
- Niña Dolino as Joan
- Angel Jacob as Grace
- Edgar Sandalo as Mayor Gasti
- Mariel Sorino as Lolita
- Paul Salas as Young David
- Dorothy Ann Perez as Young Sandra
- Micah Muñoz as Paul

== See also ==
- Precious Hearts Romances Presents
