= Love Me Again (TV series) =

- Genre: Drama, Romance, Comedy
- Created by: ABS-CBN Studios; Heart Yngrid
- Based on: Love Me Again by Heart Yngrid
- Directed by: Ruel S. Bayani; Jojo A. Saguin
- Starring: Valerie Concepcion; Tom Rodriguez; Johan Santos; Cathy Remperas
- Opening theme: "Way Back Into Love" by Sam Milby and Toni Gonzaga
- Country of origin: Philippines
- Original language: Filipino
- No. of episodes: 29

Production
- Executive producers: Carlo Katigbak; Cory Vidanes; Laurenti Dyogi
- Running time: 30-45 minutes
- Production company: LMD Unit

Original release
- Network: ABS-CBN
- Release: April 5 – May 14, 2010

Love Me Again is a 2010 Philippine television drama romance series broadcast by ABS-CBN. The series is based on the Filipino pocket book novel of the same title created by Heart Yngrids, the series is the ninth installment of Precious Hearts Romances Presents. Directed by Ruel S. Bayani and Jojo A. Saguin, it stars Johan Santos, Cathy Remperas, Valerie Concepcion and Tom Rodriguez. It aired on the network's Hapontastic line up and worldwide on TFC from April 5 to May 14, 2010, replacing Precious Hearts Romances Presents: Lumang Piso Para sa Puso and was replaced by Precious Hearts Romances Presents: Impostor.

== Synopsis ==
When Precy comes home for a two-week vacation, she learns that her brother Donnie is devastated because he was dumped by his girlfriend, Pauleen. Precy learns that Pauleen dumped Donnie for another man.

Being a protective "ate", Precy decides to do something about it. With the help of her friend Cardo, Precy investigates and learns that Pauleen's new boyfriend is Chad.

Chad used to be in love with Precy and Precy sees this as a chance for revenge. Precy will let Pauleen feel what Donnie felt - to be dumped and be broken-hearted. So Precy decides to seduce Chad and steal him from Pauleen.

The problem is, he is no longer the Chad she used to know, the Chad who was so in love with her.

Precy will do anything to make chad want her again, realizing that she's doing this not for her brother anymore, but her own self. Because Precy has already fallen in love with Chad.

== Cast and characters ==
=== Main cast ===
- Valerie Concepcion as Preciosa "Precy" Pilapil: a 26-year-old project manager of a condominium. She is an overprotective sister that sometimes she becomes too controlling. She and her brother became orphans when they were young and Precy stood as his brother's both mother and father. She is quite an old maid and had no boyfriend since birth.
- Tom Rodriguez as Chadilton "Chad" Barrera: a 27-year-old owner of a resto-bar. He is a former suitor of Precy and is willing to do anything for her. But when she dumped him, he became a changed man.
- Johan Santos as Donato "Donnie" Pilapil: a 21-year-old fresh graduate who is preparing to take the board exam. He got brokenhearted when his girlfriend dumped him and ever since then he lost his way and dealt with depression by spending his time with drinking with friends and being immature.
- Cathy Remperas as Pauleen Dimagulangan: a 21-year-old ex-girlfriend of Donnie who is now the girlfriend of Chad. She works as a promo girl for Chad's resto-bar.

=== Supporting cast ===
- Nina Ricci Alagao as Keanna Mondragon
- Bettina Carlos as Almira "Al" Ocampo
- Maria Isabel Lopez as Sonia Barrera
- Ramil Rodriguez as Eugene Barrera
- Minnie Aguilar as Argentina "Tina" Dimagulangan
- Kathleen Lopena-Ortega as Helene Suarez
- Archie Alemania as Cardo
- Toffi Santos as Rod
- Kenny Santos as Mark
- JM Lagumbay as Ted
- Ahron Villena as Peter

=== Guest appearances ===
- Tibo Jumalon as Macario
- Hermes Bautista as Aries
- Kontin Roque as Inggo
- Ching Arellano as Subas

== See also ==
- Precious Hearts Romances Presents
