= The Substitute Bride =

- Genre: Drama
- Created by: ABS-CBN Studios; Martha Cecilia
- Based on: The Substitute Bride by Martha Cecilia
- Directed by: Connie S.A. Macatuno; Nico Hernandez
- Starring: Paw Diaz; Rafael Rosell; Carla Humphries
- Opening theme: "Way Back Into Love" by Sam Milby and Toni Gonzaga
- Country of origin: Philippines
- Original language: Filipino
- No. of episodes: 10

Production
- Executive producer: Mark Anthony Gile
- Running time: 30-45 minutes

Original release
- Network: ABS-CBN
- Release: February 15 – February 26, 2010

The Substitute Bride is a 2010 Philippine television drama romance series broadcast by ABS-CBN. The series is based on the Filipino pocket book novel of the same title created by Martha Cecilla, the series is the sixth installment of Precious Hearts Romances Presents. Directed by Connie S.A. Macatuno and Nico Hernandez, it stars Paw Diaz, Rafael Rosell and Carla Humphries. It aired on the network's Hapontastic line up and worldwide on TFC from February 15 to February 26, 2010, replacing Precious Hearts Romances Presents: Love Is Only in the Movies and was replaced by Precious Hearts Romances Presents: You're Mine, Only Mine.

== Plot ==
This episode begins after Wilda's auntie died, when an unexpected driver leaves her auntie dead on the road. Wilda Abrantes now 23, and living presently in 2010, is an unemployed graduate. She seeks help in the classified ads, so she can find a job. She leads herself into the Guttierez engineering firm, but her cousin, who was a recent secretary, tells her the needs and wants of Mr. Guttierez. Also, no one can fall in love with him, and they never last one day, one week, or one month or even a year, after he tricks them into falling in love with him. So Wilda plans on becoming a secretary to show him what he has got. She immediately gets accepted, as she becomes the 24-year-old Wilda Abrantes, and does not even fall for his charms. However, secretly then as months go by, and now 9 months later, Wilda and Brent start falling in love, after a recent conversation on top of the roof's terrace. They have a lovely coffee date before leaving work. This leads to their romance, but both hide their feelings. A few days later, Candra (Carla Humphries) comes home and is in an arranged marriage with Brent, but Wilda finds out Candra is the daughter of the man who left her auntie 7 years ago on the road dead, after running her over. So, she decides to hide her identity as a secretary, but as Brent fights his feelings back, he then unexpectedly gets left by Candra, and unexpectedly Wilda is called in to be his substitute bride. Brent's mother, who already loves Wilda, agrees, even though Candra left. However, as they live a happily ever after, Candra returns, and her father as she does not like what she sees. One night Brent rescues her, and after everything is at peace, they fall in love and live happily ever after, and now both believe that love does end with one.

== Cast and characters ==
=== Main cast ===
- Paw Diaz as Wilda Albantes
- Rafael Rosell as Brent Guttierez
- Carla Humphries as Candra Dela Rosa

=== Supporting cast ===
- Ricardo Cepeda as Armando Guttierez
- Melissa Mendez as Josie Lopez-Guttierez
- Soliman Cruz as Peping Albantes
- Frances Ignacio as Elena Albantes
- Lorenzo Mara as Hector Dela Rosa
- Cara Eriguel as Rory
- Manuel Chua as Carlo
- JM de Guzman as Jimmy

=== Guest cast ===
- Julia Montes as Young Wilda
- Cheska Ortega as Young Candra
- Nikko Buenviaje as Teen Brent
- Justin Cuyugan as Sam
- Dionne Monsanto as Agnes

== See also ==
- Precious Hearts Romances Presents
