= Kristine (TV series) =

Philippine television series

- Official title card
- Also known as: Martha Cecilia's Kristine
- Genre: Romantic drama
- Created by: Martha Cecilia
- Based on: Kristine Series by Martha Cecilia
- Developed by: ABS-CBN Studios
- Directed by: Rory B. Quintos; Richard I. Arellano; Theodore C. Boborol
- Starring: Cristine Reyes; Denise Laurel; Zanjoe Marudo; Rafael Rosell; Iya Villania; Rayver Cruz
- Theme music composer: George Canseco
- Opening theme: "Ngayon at Kailanman" by Vina Morales
- Country of origin: Philippines
- Original language: Filipino
- No. of seasons: 2
- No. of episodes: 129

Production
- Executive producers: Carlo Katigbak; Cory Vidanes; Laurenti Dyogi
- Producer: Mavic Holgado-Oducayen
- Production locations: Metro Manila, Philippines
- Running time: 30-45 minutes

Original release
- Network: ABS-CBN
- Release: August 16, 2010 – February 11, 2011

Related
- Ina, Kapatid, Anak; Ngayon at Kailanman

Martha Cecilia's Kristine is a Philippine television drama romantic series broadcast by ABS-CBN. The series is based on 54 books of the PHR pocketbook series of the same name created by Martha Cecilia, developed by Rondel P. Lindayag, Roldeo T. Endrinal, and Julie Anne R. Benitez, the series is the twelfth installment of the Precious Hearts Romances Presents. Directed by Rory B. Quintos, Richard I. Arellano, and Theodore C. Boborol, it stars Cristine Reyes, Denise Laurel, Zanjoe Marudo, Rafael Rosell, and Rayver Cruz. It aired on the network's Primetime Bida line up and worldwide on TFC from August 16, 2010 to February 11, 2011, replacing Rubi and was replaced by Green Rose.

The series is about two rival families—the Fortalejos and the de Silvas— two sisters of the Fortalejo family unexpectedly fall in love with a de Silva.

It was also the official offering of the celebration of 60 Years of Pinoy Soap Opera.

== Plot ==
=== Book One: Epilogue ===
Right before the big feud between the Fortalejo and De Silva families, Alicia De Silva was deeply in love with Don Leon Fortalejo. Don Leon, already married to Kristine Esmeralda Lopez-Fortalejo, refused to be with her until one night when Alicia sneaked in his bedroom. That mistake lead to being pregnant and Ernesto De Silva (Alicia's father) calling it "disgracing the family". Since Alicia lied about Romano Fortalejo (Don Leon's favorite child) being the father of her child, the two business partners, Don Leon and Ernesto arranged a marriage for their children. Romano and Ana Marie Soriano, being in love together, escaped to live their own lives while leaving Alicia at the altar on the day of their marriage. This enraged Ernesto to a fight causing his life and Don Leon's left arm. Alfon De Silva, Ernesto oldest son seeking for revenge raped and killed Esmeralda. Due to the pain of losing his wife, Don Leon announced the feud and disowning Romano.

Years later, Romano and Ana bore two children, Kristine Emerald Fortalejo and Kristine Jewel Fortalejo (not knowing of the feud). Romano died leaving a lot of hospital bills. A penny away to being poor, Ana told the whole story about their background telling her children to never take the inheritance left by Esmeralda. Emerald, not listening drove to Villa Kristine to receive the inheritance but accidentally drove to the Hacienda De Silva. There she met Marco De Silva who kidnapped her but later fell deeply in love with each other.

Jewel almost dying of worry for her sister, went to Paso De Blas hoping to find Emerald. There, she met Jamie Reyes in a funny way and pretended to be his wife to be accepted in the Hacienda De Silva as a worker. Many days past of working in the sun and finding Emerald, but Jewel and Jamie fell in love with each other.

After many conflicts with Alfon, Don Cesar Zaragoza, and Don Leon the Fortalejo family was reunited. Marco and Emerald were also broken hearted because a certain deal with Don Leon and Julia De Silva were made. Emerald vowed to be an enemy to Marco. Marco still tries to clear his name and prove that Margarita Fortalejo is a murderer. Although Don Leon wants Lance for Jewel instead of Jamie, his driver, many escapes by Jewel and Jamie were planned to be with each other. But when Don Leon learned that his son, Bernard Fortalejo is alive, he tries hard to find the lovers. Bernard Fortalejo was revealed to be Jamie Reyes a fact that will ruin Jewel and Jamie's lives.

Meanwhile, Alfon De Silva showed up in a bar in Paso De Blas where Margarita was drinking, and made a deal to be partners. Then the rival between the Fortalejo and De Silva stopped when Don Leon Fortalejo re-arranged peace to Paso De Blas. Suddenly, Bernard De Silva Fortalejo "Jaime Reyes" showed up and attempted to kill his father Don Leon for forbidding their love (Jewel and "Jaime"). Don Leon said that "Jaime Reyes" is Bernard De Silva Fortalejo and Don Leon and Alicia De Silva's son making Jewel and him "uncle and niece". After the event when Don Leon went to his car, the car suddenly exploded causing Don Leon's death (caused by Gemma Zaragoza for revenge).

Right after the incident, Margarita Fortalejo-Cervantes is finding a way to claim the riches of her late father Don Leon Fortalejo. The last will and testament of Don Leon giving his properties to Jewel Fortalejo, Emerald Fortalejo, Ana Fortalejo, Bernard Fortalejo, Jose Cervantes, Margarita Cervantes and their son, Nathaniel Cervantes. The last will and testament of Don Leon gave Bernard, Jewel, and Emerald many of his riches, gave Margarita's family little, and since he gave Villa Kristine to Romano and Ana is his wife, Ana owns it. This outraged Margarita to anger when she found out that her father gave her very little, causing Margarita to find a way to get all of her father's riches.

Suddenly Stella Ilarmo (Jewel's biological mother) showed up in Paso De Blas claiming her daughter Jewel Fortalejo, which means that Jewel is not the daughter of Romano and Ana Fortalejo and the sister of Emerald Fortalejo. Margarita paid Alfon De Silva to investigate Ana, then Stella showing up in Villa Kristine made Ana frightened to reveal her deep secret about Jewel's real identity. Stella saw Jewel and Ana introduced Stella as her "friend" which is a lie because Stella is really Ana's sister. Stella applied as Jewel's assistant which made Margarita very curious about the real identity of Stella making Margarita pay Alfon to investigate Stella. Then, Alfon revealed that Jewel is not a true Fortalejo making her and Jaime's love "unforbidden" because Jewel is not a Fortalejo meaning that she is not the niece of Bernard. Upon Margarita knowing that Jewel is not a real Fortalejo and making Jewel and Bernard to love each other (married) again stirred up Margarita on finding a way on making Jewel and Bernard not love each other because she thought that if Jewel marries Jaime making Jewel a Fortalejo. Margarita thought that it would be harder for her to claim his father's riches when Jewel marries Jaime. Emerald Fortalejo and Marco De Silva marries as well as Jewel and Bernard making Jewel a Fortalejo. The story continues on the sons and daughters of Jewel, Jaime, Emerald and Marco up to the last true Fortalejo living namely Leon Fortalejo. Leon Fortalejo will show up at the last book (book 52) of the series as the last Fortalejo living.

As the first book of the television series ends in Book 52 in the Martha Cecilia's Kristine Book Series. As Stella enters the lives of Anna, and Jewel, complications arise as Jewel is with Jaime. Fate has its ways of putting them in harm as well, as Jewel leaves he Mansion after her complications and dealing with family. Hostility arises and she decides to go on with a little trip to Lance's farm. After a few days of spending time with Lance, she decides to occupy a little time at the manor, but leaves abruptly as she decides to go back to the place Jaime and Jewel spent time with each other. Jaime is already there and Jewel and Jaime spend time avoiding each other as they know that they cannot fall for each other. Jewel tries to hold back tears, and pain, as she tries to deliberately hold it back as Lance is in her heart now as she is unaware that she is not a Fortalejo. Jaime and Jewel's encounter makes them so happy but at home issues begin as of her disappearance. Anna and Stella, confront each other of being a mother to Jewel, and as for Stella she does not know that the man she slept with Alfon, is using her to get through his plans, but as she makes a phone call she is not there for Jewel, but indeed for the money. Meanwhile, Margarita, is now ignored by her husband, and son and decides to make a scheme. She collaborates with Alfon, into kidnapping Anna who is Alfon's obsession after the near encounter, while Jewel is Margarita's plan to kill after losing everything especially her inheritance.

=== Book Two: Prequel ===
As Book 1 ends in the television series adaptation of Martha Cecilia's Kristine Book Series, Jewel and Jaime are in each other's arms once again, and Lance tries to convince Jewel who she will pick at almost any point, the one man she truly loves, or the one that is now healing her broken heart. Margarita's schemes makes it hectic and unraveling. What will Jaime and Marco uncover about Stella and Alfon's relationship as they are unaware of Stella? Meanwhile, as secrets unravel, Jewels safety is at risk as she is now in Lance's arms. Fate also brings her to the unaware truth that Stella is her mother as she runs away from her home she instantly forgives but one day she and Jaime are in each other's hands again but Alfon and Stella are over and done with and now Margarita is up to something. After an evening with Lance, Jewel finds her mother Anna and Stella in a bitter argument of a secret. But as it unravels, Jewel finds out she is not the real Fortalejo leaving her to confront her mother, and Stella who is her biological mother in her heartache. She runs back to the village where her romance with Jaime was left and now she finds himself confessing to a group of villagers his love for her as she sees him. She then says yes and agrees to marry him after she finds out the truth, but as she runs back home she tells Anna she's leaving and she and Jaime get married but are now lost in a happily ever after. As they come back to the Fortalejo manor, Stella decides to leave the manor to find a job in Taiwan but things are cut short when Alfon traps Anna and Stella. Stella thinks that she is on Alfon's side that is betrayed and later ends up being held hostage calling Jewel into a trap. When she is followed by Lance as she and Jaime arrive to the scene, Anna is begging and so is Stella for Alfon to let go and let them leave. But the plan is cut short as Anna and Stella both find Jewel arrive. Anna is still taken hostage leaving her and Stella. With the help of Lance, Jaime and Marco to the rescue, Margarita leaves Jewel and Stella being held hostage unaware she is also part of the plot. A fight leashes out leaving Jewel in the building with Stella but she gets shot and saves Jewel but. the building starts to burn. And to Margarita's extent, she thinks that her plan to eliminate and get her revenge result her to be successful but turns out as things go good for her, lives are in a living hell with the death of Jewel. Will the truth be prevailed or is there any evidence or hope that Jewel maybe alive after all? At the end, Margarita traps Jewel and plans to bomb the place she is in. But Bernard, Marco, Scarlet, and Nathaniel are there to save her. Suddenly, Margarita finds out that her son is out there because she was watching the surveillance camera. So she let Jewel out and ran for they had very little time until the bomb would burst. After they were all safe, Margarita realized she forgot her important necklace that was the key to all the gold. So she went back to find it, then the bomb burst and she is killed. At her burial, Jewel explained she was pregnant with another baby, Diana found her true love, Marco and Emerald got married, and Nathaniel and Jasmin took care of Jasmin's sister.

== Cast and characters ==
=== Main cast ===
The Cast of Precious Hearts Romances Presents: Kristine

- Cristine Reyes as Kristine Jewel Fortalejo
- Zanjoe Marudo as Jaime Reyes/Bernard De Silva
- Denise Laurel as Kristine Emerald Fortalejo-De Silva
- Rafael Rosell as Marco De Silva
- Rayver Cruz as Lance Navarro
- Lito Legaspi as Don Leon Fortalejo
- Irma Adlawan as Margarita Fortalejo-Cervantes
- William Lorenzo as Josef Cervantes
- Angel Jacob as Ana Marie Soriano-Fortalejo
- Carla Martinez as Julia De Silva
- Eric Fructuoso as Alfon De Silva

=== Additional cast ===
- Arlene Tolibas as Tekla
- Bayani Casimiro Jr. as Nonong
- Elijah Magundayao as Buboy
- JM de Guzman as Nathaniel Cervantes
- Bangs Garcia as Diana Montero
- Iya Villania as Scarlet Saavedra
- Kristel Moreno as Jasmin Cuevo
- Neri Naig as Rowena Guevarra
- Joross Gamboa as Charlie
- Tibo Jumalon as Tibo
- Sharmaine Suarez as Stella Elarmo
- John Medina as Elmer Saavedra

=== Special participation ===
- Chin-Chin Gutierrez as Kristine Esmeralda Lopez-Fortalejo
- Johnny Revilla as Ernesto De Silva
- Christian Vasquez as Romano Fortalejo
- Wendy Valdez as Alicia De Silva

=== Guest cast ===
- Chinggoy Alonzo as Don Cesar Zaragoza
- Gilette Sandico as Gemma Zaragoza
- Tanya Gomez as Juaning Reyes
- Arnold Reyes as Rufo
- Cai Cortez as Keanna
- Richard Yap as Jandy
- Miles Ocampo as Maya
- Albie Casiño as Dominic Ellarmo
- Josef Elizalde as Nathaniel's Friend
- Princess Manzon as Prostitute
- Cathy Remperas as Prized Girlfriend
- Kyra Custodio as Young Margarita Fortalejo
- Marikit Morales as Daisy
- Mary Roldan as Cora
- Auriette Divina as Demi Ingrid Alejo
- Gee-Ann Abrahan as Ashley
- Joyce So as Ruby
- Bam Romana as GBoy
- Kelly Misa as Mylene
- Manuel Chua as Scarlet's ex-boyfriend
- Jose Sarasola as Diana's new boyfriend (in a final episode)

== Reception ==
=== Ratings ===
According to Kantar Media, the pilot episode of the hit series scored 18.6% ratings nationwide.

=== Music ===
- Ngayon At Kailanman - Vina Morales (Official Theme Song)
- Hanggang May Kailanman - Carol Banawa
- Sakaling Malimutan Ka - Carol Banawa
- Di Ko Kayang Limutin - Liezel Garcia

=== Launch ===
Kristine was launched as one of the ABS-CBN's offerings for the 60th Celebration of Filipino Soap Opera ("Ika-60 taon ng Pinoy Soap Opera") during the ABS-CBN Trade Launch for the first quarter of 2010, entitled "Bagong Simula" (New Beginning).

== Controversial leave ==
Lead star Denise Laurel, who plays Cristine Reyes' sister Emerald, took an indefinite leave during the season due to constraints regarding some scenes concerning her image. The indefinite leave left fans of the popular primetime series wondering if her recurring character would be back in the second and final season.

== See also ==
- Precious Hearts Romances Presents
- List of programs broadcast by ABS-CBN
