= Ina Raymundo =

Filipino actress (born 1975)

- Born: Rina Marie Padilla Raymundo; December 9, 1975 (age 50); Meycauayan, Bulacan, Philippines
- Occupation: Actress
- Years active: 1994–present
- Spouse: Brian Poturnak (m. 2003)
- Children: 5

Rina Marie " Ina" Padilla Raymundo-Poturnak (born December 9, 1975) is a Filipino actress. She is best known for her appearance in the 1995 San Miguel Beer television advertisement "Sabado Nights" (English: Saturday Nights), and its 2017 remake. Raymundo was nominated for the Gawad Urian Award for Best Actress for the film Tuhog (2001) where she portrayed a victim of incestuous rape. She has also released an album and performed on stage plays.

== Career ==
In 1994, Raymundo appeared in her first magazine cover at 18 years old. She then appeared nude on the cover of the March 2000 issue of People Asia. She also appeared on the cover of the November 2015 issue of FHM Philippines at age 39. She appeared again on the cover of FHM Philippines for the March 2017 issue, at age 41.

In 2003, Raymundo married Ukrainian-Canadian businessman Brian Poturnak. The couple have five children together named Erika Rae, Jakob, Mikaela Jade, Anika Sage, and Minka Eve.

Aside from doing a variety of films from sexy to action and comedy, she has delved into drama such as her critically acclaimed performance in Tuhog in 2001. In 2012, she returned to television via the afternoon series Lumayo Ka Man sa Akin, in the 2015 remake of Marimar, and in 2016's The Millionaire's Wife.

Raymundo also starred as Annie Mariano in the ABS-CBN romantic drama series Can't Buy Me Love (2023–2024).

== Filmography ==
=== Film ===
Year	Title	Role	References
1995	Bikini Watch	Dovie	
1995	Sabado Nights	Rina	
1996	Sobra-Sobra, Labis-Labis		
1996	Masamang Damo	Charina Santos	
1996	SPO4 Santiago (Sharpshooter)	Venus	
1996	Lihim	Bianca	
1996	Bridesmaids	Roni Hizon	
1997	The Onyok Velasco Story	May	
1997	Eseng ng Tondo	Elvie	
1998	Berdugo	Claudia	
1999	Abel Villarama: Armado	Christina Martinez	
1999	Markado	Jenny	
1999	Burlesk Queen Ngayon	Angela	
2000	Shame, Bakit Ako Mahihiya?		
2000	Madame X	Donna Fuentez / Victoria Torralba	
2001	Tuhog	Floring	
2001	Kaaway Hanggang Hukay	Barbara Veloso	
2001	Shake, Rattle & Roll 13	Angelie	
2002	Ang Alamat ng Lawin	Camila	
2015	Halik sa Hangin	Teresa	
2016	Vince and Kath and James	Belinda	
2017	The Ghost Bride	Dolores Lim	
2018	Kuya Wes	Erika	
2019	Open	Erika	
2020	Block Z	Angie	
2023	Pieta	Sarah	
2024	X & Y	Ysha	

=== Television ===
Year	Title	Role
1995	T.G.I.S.	Mimi
1995	Maalaala Mo Kaya: Tawas	Sandra
1996	Maalaala Mo Kaya: Gayuma	Celia
1997	Abangan ang Susunod Na Kabanata	Trina Delos Santos
1997	Onli Da Pilipins	
2000	Kiss Muna	Shirley
2000	Pangako Sa 'Yo	Eidelwess Guttenberg
2007	Rounin	Reema / Deinara
2009	All About Eve	Lisa Cortez-Gonzales
2010	Precious Hearts Romances Presents: Midnight Phantom	Anya Dela Merced
2011	Maalaala Mo Kaya: Sulat	Emma
2012	Precious Hearts Romances Presents: Lumayo Ka Man sa Akin	Consuelo Cordero
2013	ASAP	Herself / performer
2014	Be Careful with My Heart	Celeste Madrigal
2015	Nasaan Ka Nang Kailangan Kita	Dolores Buyaao-Macaraig
2015	Eat Bulaga Lenten Special: Sukli ng Pagmamahal	Rebecca
2015	All of Me	Dianna Figueras
2015	Ipaglaban Mo: Nawaglit na Tiwala	Sally
2015	MariMar	Brenda Guillermo
2015	Magpakailanman: Asawa ni Mister, Kabit ni Misis	Stacy
2016	The Millionaire's Wife	Allison Montecillo
2016	Wagas	Melissa Mendez
2016–2017	Trops	Ms. Almalyn Macauba
2016	Karelasyon: Dalawang Mukha	Margaret
2016	Tsuperhero	Bakite
2017	D' Originals	Liza Inocencio
2017–2018	La Luna Sangre	Veruska Arguelles
2018–2019	Ngayon at Kailanman	Adessa Mapendo
2019	Ipaglaban Mo: Lulong	Clara
2019	Maalaala Mo Kaya: Lipstick	Sally
2020	Make It with You	Raquel Villarica
2020	I Am U	Claire
2022	Tadhana: Ina, Anak, Asawa	Lorena
2022	Bolera	Floriza "White Lotus" Andal
2022	2 Good 2 Be True	Olivia Agcaoili
2023–2024	Can't Buy Me Love	Annie Pedrosa-Mariano / Annie Pedrosa-Al Jufalli
2026	The Secrets of Hotel 88	Frida Almazan
2026	Sigabo	Misty Manalo

== Discography ==
=== Studio albums ===
Title	Album details
Touch Me Where It's Hot	Released: 2001; Label: Dyna Music

== Recognitions ==
Year	Award	Category	Result	Won by	Note
2015	FHM Philippines	100 Sexiest Woman	Rank # 65	Jennylyn Mercado	

Preceded by Danielle Castaño, Queenie Rehmann and Cindy Miranda	FHM Cover Girl (November 2015)	Succeeded by Kim Domingo
Preceded by Emmanuelle Vera and Julz Savard	FHM Cover Girl (March 2017 )	Succeeded by Phoebe Walker
