= Rafael Rosell =

Norwegian-Filipino actor and model

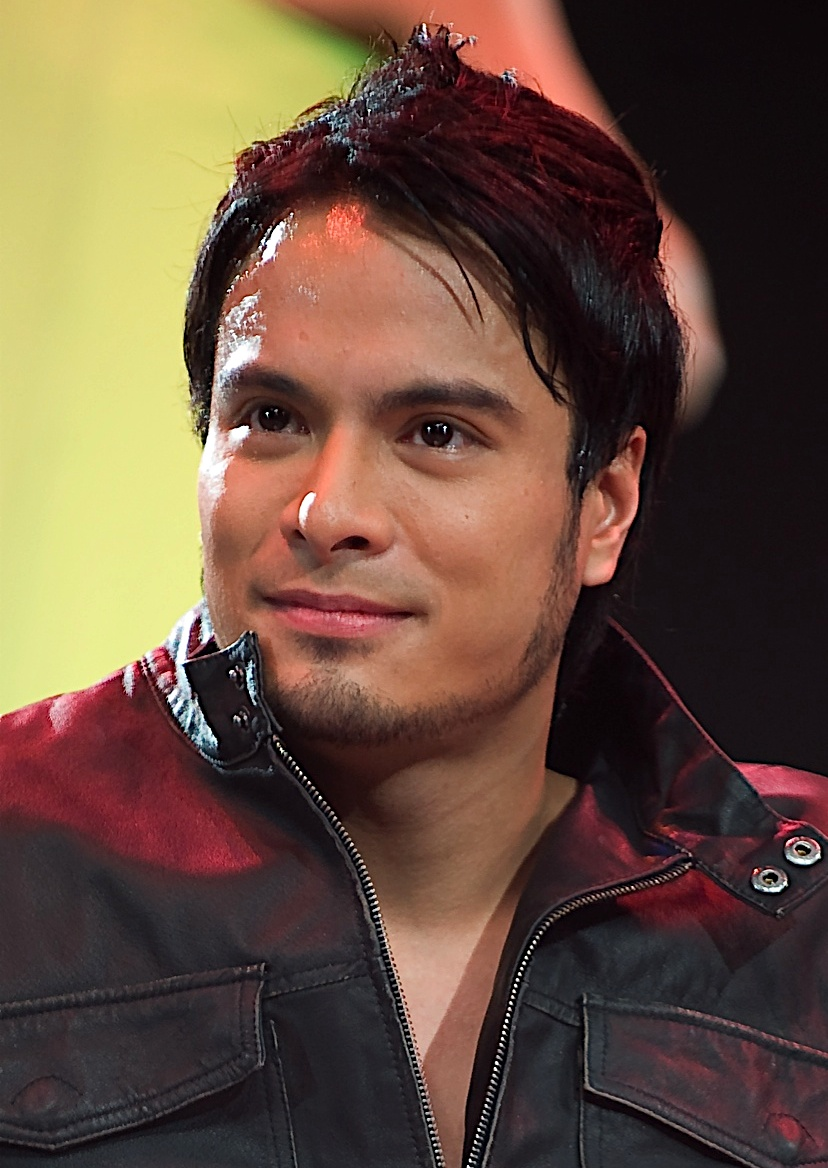
- Rosell at the Star Magic Concert Tour in Ontario, June 2009
- Born: Rafael Rosell IV (Note: Rafael Roselle was born in Norway. Thus, he does not possess his mother's maiden name which is Quimpo.); November 10, 1982 (age 44); Stavanger, Norway
- Other names: Raffy, Paeng
- Occupations: Model; actor
- Years active: 2000–present
- Agents: Star Magic (2000–2012; 2019–2021; 2024); Sparkle (2012–2019; 2021–2025); Luminary Talent Management (2012–present)
- Partner(s): Malaya Lewandowski (2006–2009); Olivia Medina (2013–2016); Valerie G. Chia (2016–present)

Rafael Rosell IV (born November 10, 1982) is a Filipino actor who has been currently a freelance artist since 2019.

== Early life and background ==
Rafael Rosell IV was born in Stavanger, Norway on November 10, 1982, to Filipino parents; his father, Rafael Rosell III, is a geologist from Cebu, and his mother, Amelia Quimpo, is a nurse from Bicol. He was raised in Norway, while his grandfather, Rafael Rosell Jr., and his great-grandfather, Rafael Rosell Sr., were both raised in Cebu. Rosell has two siblings and he is the eldest amongst them.

== Acting career ==
=== 2000–2012; 2019–2021; 2024–present: Career in ABS-CBN ===
During a vacation with his family in 2000, Rosell's mother found out about the auditions at ABS-CBN. He auditioned and got a TV commercial job for Close-Up toothpaste and signed a contract with Star Magic later that year.

In 2002, Rosell was introduced as one of the leading men of Jolina Magdangal, in Star Cinema's Kung Ikaw ay Isang Panaginip. His big break came in 2004 when he was paired with Claudine Barretto on the ABS-CBN fantaserye Marina. In 2006, he was launched as a member of the all-male group Coverboys with Zanjoe Marudo, Jon Avila, Victor Basa, and Jake Cuenca.

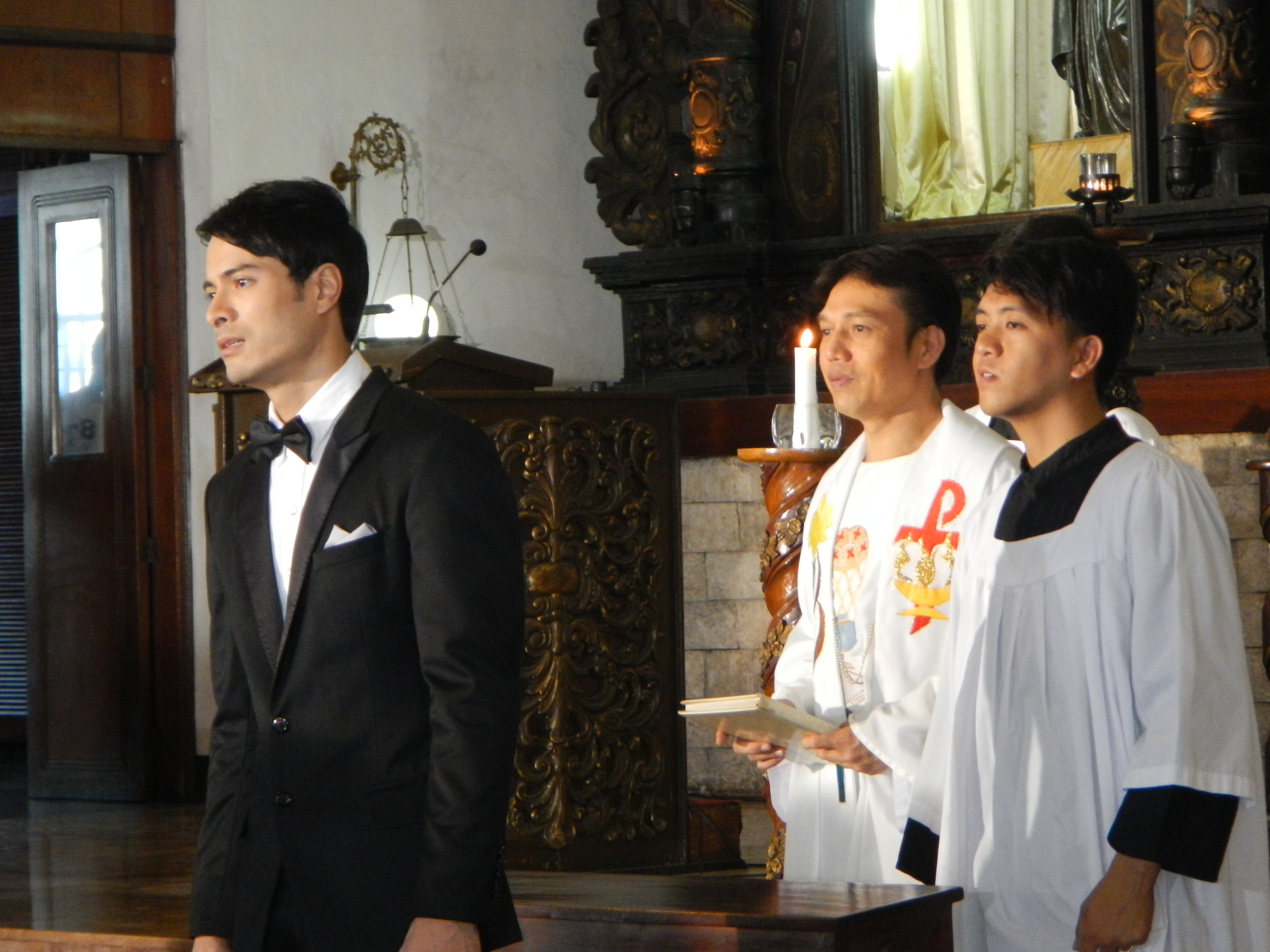
Rossell as Nigel Armada (Temptation of Wife at Santuario de San Pedro Bautista).

In 2007, Rosell won the Best Supporting Actor Award at the 30th Gawad Urian Awards for his work in the indie film Rome & Juliet.

He was a part of projects including Rounin, Prinsesa ng Banyera and Maligno. He starred in Status: Single under Viva Films.

Rosell started getting recognition in 2010 when he played Brandon Brazil in the ABS-CBN afternoon drama Midnight Phantom opposite his close friend Denise Laurel. After the success of Midnight Phantom and his team-up with Laurel, ABS-CBN paired them up again in Kristine. The team-up came to an abrupt end when Laurel took a one-year hiatus due to pregnancy, leaving Rosell to be paired up with Jodi Sta. Maria in 100 Days to Heaven.

In 2012, Rosell was reunited with Laurel in another ABS-CBN drama, Dahil sa Pag-ibig.

Rosell returned to ABS-CBN after seven years with GMA Network. His resurgence in the said network was in an Ipaglaban Mo! episode.

=== 2012–2019; 2021–2024: Career in GMA Network ===
In August 2012 his contract with Star Magic expired, and he moved to GMA Network. He starred in Temptation of Wife with Marian Rivera.

Rosell returned to GMA after 2 years for his comeback teleserye, To Have & to Hold.

== Personal life ==
In 2009, Rosell confirmed that he and girlfriend Malaya Lewandowski had broken up after being together for three years. He has been married to Valerie Chia since 2020.

== Acting credits ==
=== Film ===
Key
†	Denotes films that have not yet been released

Rafael Rosell's film credits with year of release, film titles and roles
Year	Title	Role	Ref.
2002	Kung Ikaw ay Isang Panaginip	Paolo	
2003	Pinay Pie	Artie	
2005	Dreamboy	Cameo appearance	
2005	Bikini Open	Sonny	
2006	Matakot Ka sa Karma	Victor	
2008	When Love Begins	Alger	
2009	Status: Single	Hans	
2009	In My Life	Vince	
2009	Ang Darling Kong Aswang	Joaquin	
2010	Fling		
2010	Working Girls	Rodney Camacho	
2010	Ang Tanging Ina Mo (Last na 'To!)	Troy	
2013	Gaydar	Nick	
2014	Dilim	Quinito Castaneda	
2017	All of You	Gino	
2018	Adam's Apples	Juan Bautista	
2022	Labyu with an Accent	Matt	
2025	Call Me Mother	host of Uniworld pageant	
2026	I Fell, It's Fine	Jun	

=== Television ===
Key
†	Denotes shows that have not yet been aired

Rafael Rosell's television credits with year of release, title(s) and role
Year	Title	Role	Notes	Ref.
2000	Tabing Ilog	Oliver McFuller		
2002	Kay Tagal Kang Hinintay	Tiborce		
2004	Wansapanataym	Brian	Episode: Mic ni Monique	
2004	Marina	Rodge		
2005	Hollywood Dream	Himself		
2005	Ang Panday	Calyptus		
2006–2012, 2025–present	ASAP XP	Himself — Host / Performer	Segment: "Cover Boys"	
2006	Star Magic Presents: Love Chop	Roy		
2006	Komiks	Edwin	Episode: " Inday Bote"	
2006	Komiks Presents: Da Adventures of Pedro Penduko	Tony / Antonio	Episode: "Santelmo"	
2007	Rounin	Creon		
2007–2008	Prinsesa ng Banyera	Charles Perrei		
2008	Your Song Presents: Superstar Ng Buhay Ko	Alex		
2008	Sineserye Presents: Maligno	Lucas Santander		
2008	Kahit Isang Saglit	Young Anthony Mondragon	Special Participation	
2008	I Love Betty La Fea	Jeremy		
2009	Your Song Presents: First Be a Woman	Professor David		
2009	Midnight DJ	Dr. Jared	Episode: Scary Retoke	
2009	Precious Hearts Romances Presents: Bud Brothers	Wayne Alban	Book 2: "My Gulay, Wow Betchay"	
2010	Precious Hearts Romances Presents: Substitute Bride	Brent Guttierez		
2010	Maalaala Mo Kaya	Nico	Episode: "Bag"	
2010	Your Song Presents: Love Me, Love You			
2010	Precious Hearts Romances: Midnight Phantom	Brandon / Midnight Phantom		
2010–2011	Precious Hearts Romances Presents: Kristine	Marco De Silva		
2011	Your Song Presents: Kim	Robert		
2011	100 Days to Heaven	Bartolome "Bart" Ramirez Jr.		
2011	Wansapanataym	Roy Estocapio	Episode: "Ningning Kuting"	
2012	Dahil sa Pag-ibig	Edison Zaguirre		
2012	Aso ni San Roque	Anton	Guest	
2012–2013	Temptation of Wife	Nigel Armada (Adopted Son/Angeline Santos Salcedo Allied and Interest Love)	Adopted Son of Lady Armada	
2013	Vampire ang Daddy Ko	Borgy	Special Participation	
2013	Indio	António		
2013	Party Pilipinas	Himself — Host / Performer		
2013–2015	Sunday All Stars	Himself — Host / Performer		
2013	Maghihintay Pa Rin	Francisco "Kiko" Sebastian		
2013	Genesis	Julio Macalintal		
2013	Wagas	Joey	Episode: "Joey & Malou Love Story"	
2014	The Borrowed Wife	Ricardo "Rico" Santos		
2014	Magpakailanman	Ben	Episode: "Asawa Mo, Hiniram Ko"	
2015	Second Chances	Jerome Padilla		
2015	Magpakailanman	Mark	Episode: "Paano Na Ang Ating Anak"	
2015	Karelasyon	Alvin	Episode: "Martir"	
2015	Dangwa	Leo		
2015	Magpakailanman	Anthony	Episode: "Husband for Sale"	
2015	Karelasyon	Paolo	Episode: "Pamana"	
2015–2016	Because of You	Oliver Dictado		
2016	Magpakailanman	Wendel	Episode: "When Love Becomes Obsession"	
2016	Magpakailanman	Willy	Episode: "Higanti ng Barang"	
2016	Karelasyon	Celio	Episode: "Madam Z"	
2016	Karelasyon	Xavier	Episode: "Nagmumurang Kamatis"	
2016	Wagas	Ramon	Episode: "The Haunted House"	
2016	Sinungaling Mong Puso	Roman Aguirre		
2017	Dear Uge	Marlon	Episode: "Ex Ex Ex"	
2017	Magpakailanman	James Aguilar	Episode: "Hanggang sa Iyong Paggising, Daddy"	
2017	Wagas	Zandro	Episode: "First Love"	
2017	Wagas	Alex	Episode: "My Love from Baler"	
2017–2018	Impostora	Homer Saavedra		
2018	Sherlock Jr.	Gregor Carreon		
2018	Daig Kayo ng Lola Ko	Hans	Episode: "Katy Fairy"	
2018	Dear Uge	David	Episode: "Beki Boyfie"	
2018	Magpakailanman	Benjie	Episode: "Ang Asawang Naging Kabit"	
2018	Cain at Abel	Young Antonio	Special Participation	
2019	Eat Bulaga!	Tourist guide	Lenten Special: "Para Sa Broken Hearted"	
2019	Ipaglaban Mo	Markus Valdez	Episode: "Impostor"	
2019	Maalaala Mo Kaya	Vincent	Episode: "Dyip"	
2019	Parasite Island	Jessie Salvacion		
2020	Bawal Lumabas: The Series	Jon-Jon		
2021	Huwag Kang Mangamba	Diego Romulo		
2021	To Have & to Hold	Tony Gatchalian		
2021	Dear Uge	Tinola Cruz	Episode: "What's My Name"	
2021	Wish Ko Lang!	Axel	Episode: "Babae Sa Cabinet"	
2022	Tadhana	Noah	Episode: "The Stepdaughter: Part 1 & 2"	
2022	Agimat ng Agila	Valerio Mariano	Supporting Cast	
2022	Lolong	Fr. Reyes	Supporting Cast	
2022	Running Man Philippines	Guest	Contestant	
2022–2023	Mano Po Legacy: The Flower Sisters	Julian Gomez		
2023	Wish Ko Lang!	Nicanor	Episode: "Mister, Nakipagrelasyon sa Tenants ng Kanilang Bahay"	
2023–2024	Can't Buy Me Love	Sherwin Yuchengco		
2024	Wish Ko Lang!	Roger	Episode: "Kamkam"	
2024	Widows' War	Paco Palacios-Castillo		
2024	Magpakailanman	George	Episode: "Asawa Noon, Kabit Ngayon"	
2024–2025	Forever Young	Albert Vergara		
2025	Lilet Matias: Attorney-at-Law	Atty. Alex Romantico		
2025	Tadhana	Pipoy	Episode: "Love Thy Neighbor: Part 1 & 3"	
2025	Wish Ko Lang!	Tony	Episode: "Pesteng Garapata"	
2025	Magpakailanman	Jay	Episode: "I Love You Tita"	
2025–2026	The Alibi	Matthew Cabrera		
2026	Magpakailanman	Archie	Episode: "Ang Babae Sa Larawan"	
2026	Blood vs Duty	Victor Reyes		
2026	Sigabo	young Ricardo Jacinto		
2026	Wish Ko Lang!	Gerald	Episode: "Bugbog Sarado" Part 1 & 2	
2026	Someone, Someday	Peter		
2026	Kamao	Marco “Pretty Boy” Velez	Guest appearance	

=== Microdrama ===
Rafael Rosell's television credits with year of release, title(s) and role
Year	Title	Role	Ref.
2026	Twist of Fate	Sam Rodriguez	
2026	The Perfect Wife	Aries Dela Minez	

== Awards and nominations ==
Year	Work	Award	Category	Result	Ref.
2007	Rome & Juliet	Gawad Urian Award	Best Supporting Actor	Won	
2014	Gaydar	Golden Screen TV Awards	Best Performance by an Actor in a Leading Role (Musical or Comedy)	Nominated	
