= Kapag Tumibok ang Puso: Not Once, But Twice =

2006 Filipino comedy drama film

Kapag Tumibok Ang Puso: Not Once, But Twice
- Directed by: Wenn V. Deramas
- Screenplay by: Mel Mendoza-Del Rosario; Arlene Tamayo
- Story by: Mel Mendoza-Del Rosario
- Produced by: Marlon M. Bautista
- Starring: Ramon "Bong" Revilla Jr.; Ai-Ai delas Alas
- Cinematography: Sherman Philip T. So
- Edited by: Renewin Alano
- Music by: Aaron del Rosario; Jessie Lasaten
- Production company: Imus Productions
- Distributed by: GMA Films Distribution
- Release date: June 14, 2006
- Country: Philippines
- Language: Filipino

Kapag Tumibok Ang Puso: Not Once, But Twice is a 2006 Filipino comedy drama film, starring Ramon Bong Revilla Jr., Ai-Ai delas Alas, and Precious Lara Quigaman.

The film marked its first time team up of Ai-Ai delas Alas and Senator Bong Revilla and also served for fellow newcomer and also Bb. Pilipinas International 2005 and Beauty Queen, Commercial Model turned actress Precious Lara Quigaman as her first film project.

== Plot ==
When a freak accident occurs, a recently widowed man named Marco Bong Revilla encounters the most unassuming person he will ever meet than even fall in love with named Love Ai-Ai delas Alas but trials and tribulations begin when their children are involved as the pressures begin with their romance whirling but an unkind past comes back to haunt Love.

== Cast ==
- Ramon "Bong" Revilla Jr. as Marco
- Ai-Ai delas Alas as Love den Laden
- Precious Lara Quigaman as Sara
- Eugene Domingo as Adora
- Inah Revilla as Sabrina
- Deejay Durano as Louie
- Ketchup Eusebio as Brad
- Janelle Jamer as Honey
- Kiray Celis as Precious den Laden
- Aaron Junatas as Marky

Special participation

- Bobby Andrews as Johnny Tor
- Chokoleit

== Soundtrack ==
The film's main theme comes from the same title from the film "Kapag Tumibok Ang Puso" a cover and single by Toni Gonzaga as the film's main soundtrack and also was originally popularized by Donna Cruz in the 90's. Additionally, Janella Salvador later covered this classic Donna Cruz's song from her self-titled album in 2015, released by Star Records (which both Toni Gonzaga and Janella Salvador are on the same recording labels from ABS-CBN).
