= Janella Salvador (album) =

Studio album by Janella Salvador
- Released: December 4, 2015
- Genre: Pop, acoustic
- Length: 26:05
- Label: Star Records

Singles from Janella Salvador
- 1. "Mahal Kita Pero"; 2. "Ganyan Talaga"; 3. "Harana Na Na Na"

Janella Salvador is the self-titled debut album of the Filipina actress and singer Janella Salvador. It was released on December 4, 2015, through Star Music. The album produced Salavador's first top ten hit, "Mahal Kita Pero".

The album has 8 tracks. The limited edition album includes 17 tracks including minus one versions of each song and the limited edition track "Happily Ever After". As of March 2017, the album was certified 2× gold (platinum) by PARI.

== Track listing ==
1. "Harana Na Na Na" - 3:30
2. "Tick Tock Love" - 3:58
3. "Ganyan Talaga" - 4:02
4. "Dear Heart" - 3:50
5. "Teka Muna Pag-ibig..." - 3:42
6. "Kapag Tumibok ang Puso" - 3:00
7. "I Can" - 4:03
8. "Kapag Tumibok ang Puso" featuring Marlo Mortel - 3:24

*Includes minus one versions of each track.

== Singles ==
The first commercial and digital single pre-released was "Mahal Kita Pero" which was originally part of Himig Handog P-Pop Love Songs in 2014. This followed by Ganyan Talaga in July 2015, the same month Star Music announced Salvador as a recording artist and their plans to release an official album for her.

Released simultaneously on December 4, 2015, in the Philippines and through Spotify and iTunes, the album contains nine tracks which include singles "Ganyan Talaga", "Mahal Kita Pero" and her own versions of Sharon Cuneta's "Dear Heart" and Donna Cruz' "I Can" and "Kapag Tumibok ang Puso". Her version of "I Can" became the theme song for her television drama, Oh My G!

== Awards ==
- 8th PMPC Star Awards for Music - Best New Female Recording Artist of the Year (2016)
