= 2014 ASAP Pop Viewers' Choice Awards =

10th ASAP Pop Viewers' Choice Awards
- Date: November 30, 2014
- Location: ASAP Studio at ABS-CBN Studio, Quezon City
- Hosted by: various
- Preshow hosts: Xian Lim, Kim Chiu, Gary Valenciano and Alex Gonzaga (Orange Carpet)

Television/radio coverage
- Network: ABS-CBN
- Runtime: 96 minutes
- Viewership: TBA
- Directed by: Johnny Manahan

The 10th ASAP Pop Viewers' Choice Awards was held on November 30, 2014.

== Voting Process ==
The voting opened during the time that the noontime variety show, ASAP released its official nominees for the year's awards show on October 5, 2014. Fans can vote in four ways: through ASAP's official website; mobile voting; print, and KakaoTalk. Voting was supposed to end on November 24, 2014, but it was extended until the next day on November 25.

== Winners and Nominees ==
Winners are listed first and highlighted in boldface.

Key to the colors used
Type of category
Pop Music Awards category
Pop Music Video Awards
Pop Movie category
Pop Kapamilya TV Show
Pop Astig category
Others

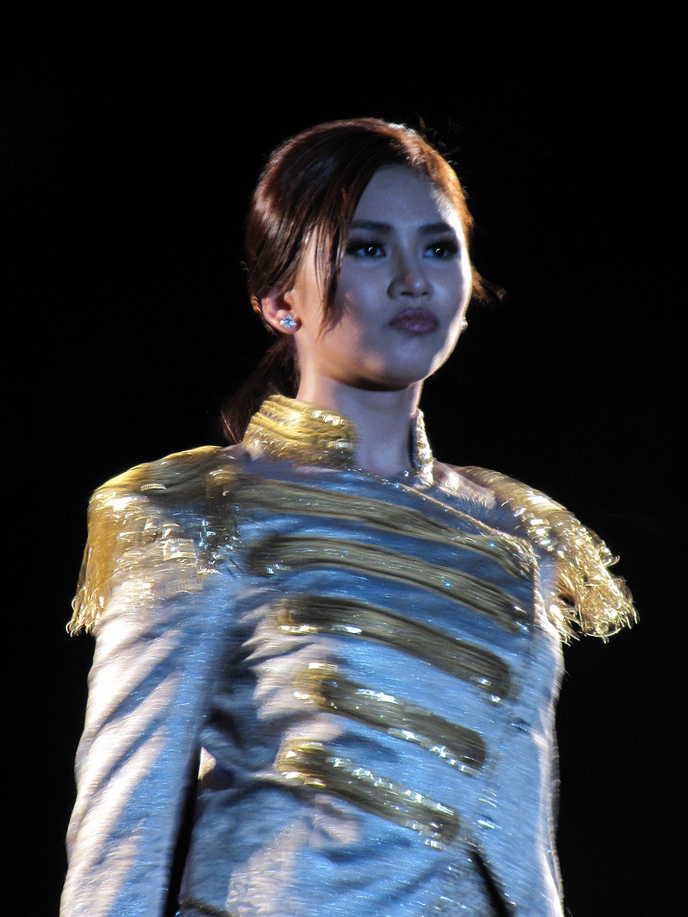
Sarah Geronimo, multiple awardee including Pop Female Artist

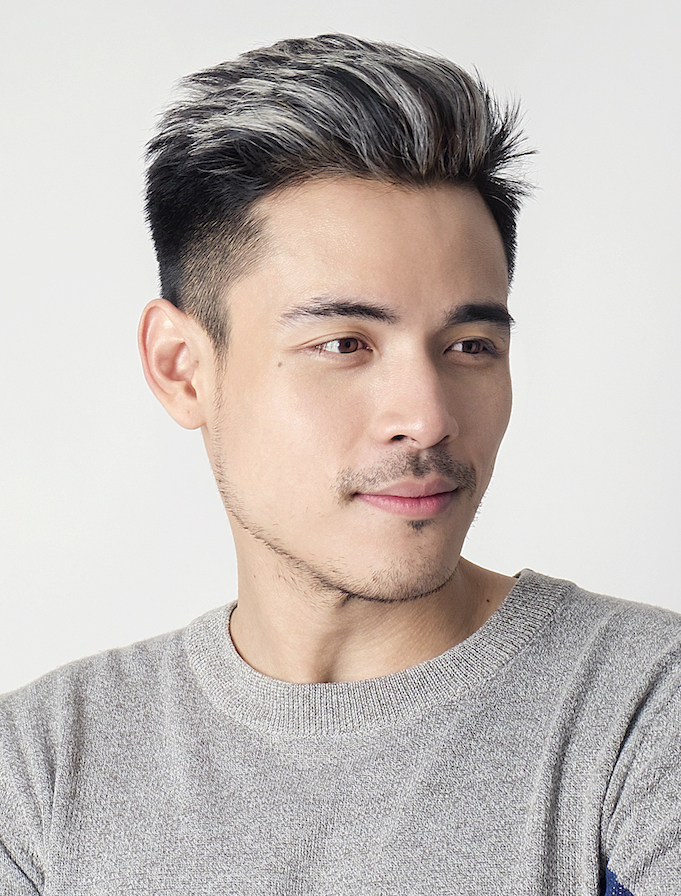
Xian Lim, multiple awardee including Pop Male Artist

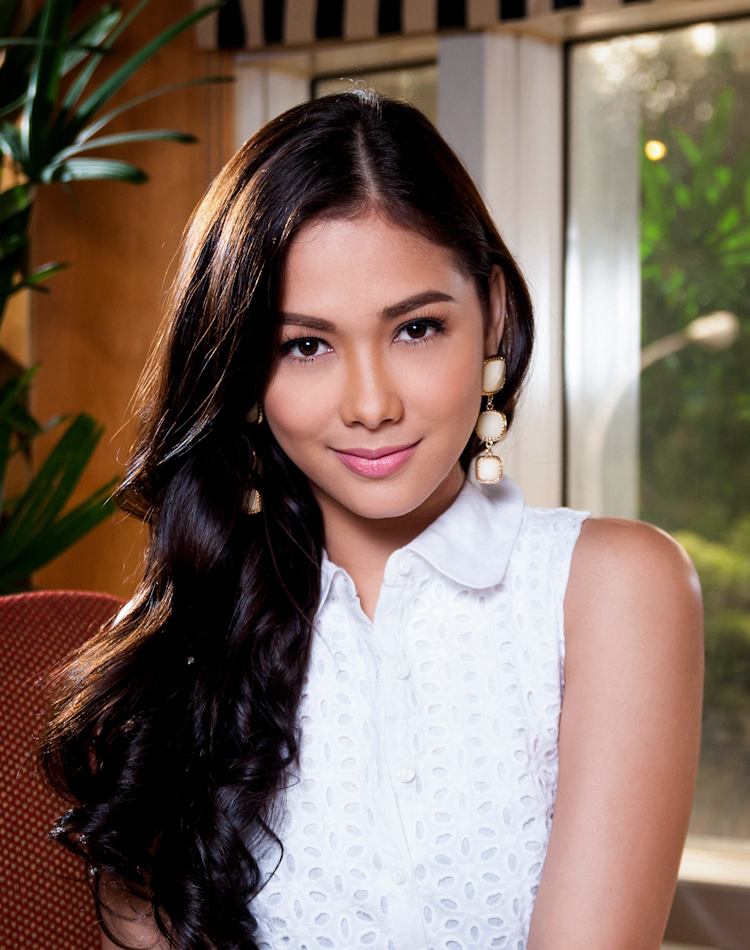
Maja Salvador, Pop Song

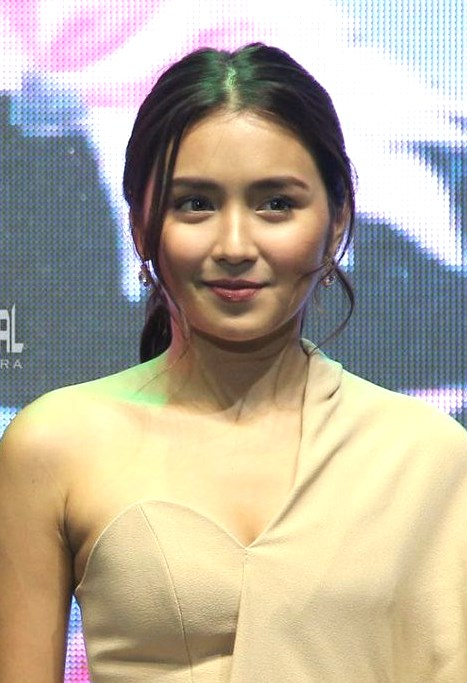
Kathryn Bernardo, multiple awardee including Pop Cover Girl

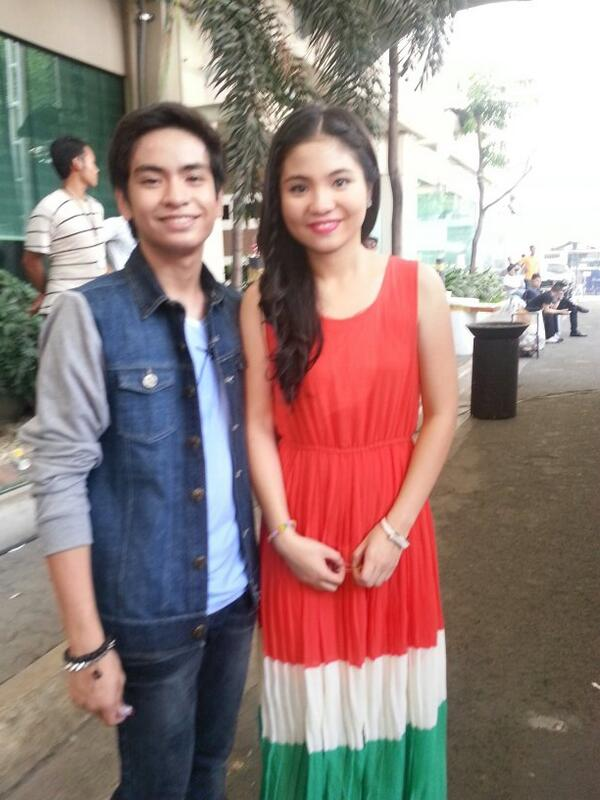
Sharlene San Pedro and Jairus Aquino, Pop Tween Popsies

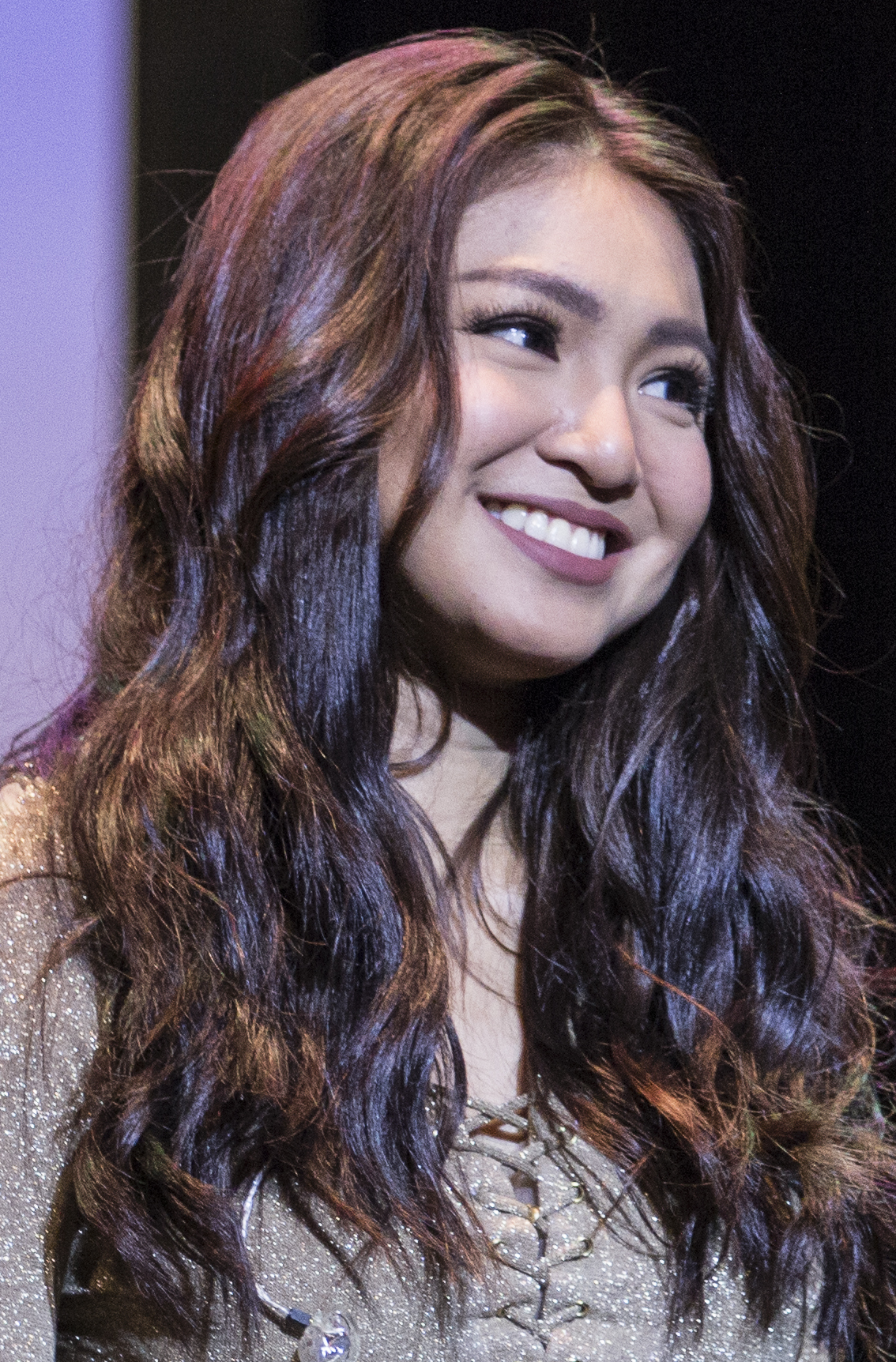
Nadine Lustre, Pop Female Cutie

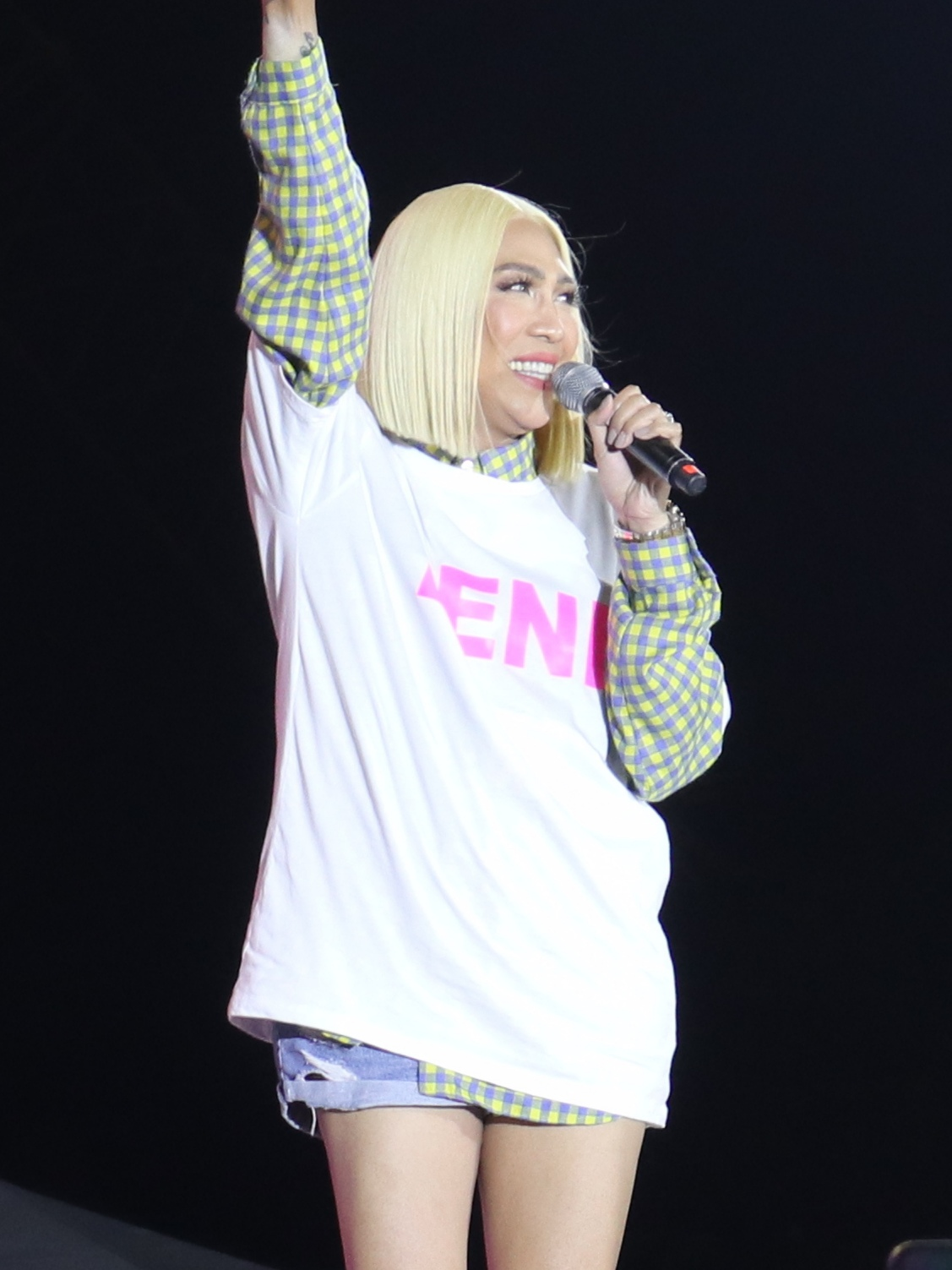
Vice Ganda, Pop InstaVideo

Pop Female Artist	Pop Male Artist
**Sarah Geronimo**; Yeng Constantino; Toni Gonzaga; Maja Salvador	**Xian Lim**; Daniel Padilla; Bamboo Mañalac; Vice Ganda
Pop Song	Pop Album
**"Dahan-Dahan" - Maja Salvador**; "Simpleng Tulad Mo" - Daniel Padilla; "Starting Over Again" - Lani Misalucha; "Pag May Time" - Xian Lim	**I Heart You - Daniel Padilla**; Higher Love - Angeline Quinto; Platinum Edition - Vice Ganda; XL2 - Xian Lim
Pop Soundtrack	Pop Music Video
**Ikaw Lamang**; Be Careful With My Heart (Lullaby Album); Got To Believe; Diary Ng Panget: The Official Soundtrack	**"Maybe This Time" - Sarah Geronimo**; "Simpleng Tulad Mo" - Daniel Padilla; "'Til I Met You" - Angeline Quinto; "Dahan-Dahan" - Maja Salvador
Pop Celebrity Cameo	Pop Movie
**Kris Aquino - "Promise Ain't Enough" (by Richard Yap)**; Kathryn Bernardo - "Simpleng Tulad Mo" (by Daniel Padilla); James Reid - "Para-paraan" (by Nadine Lustre); Marlo Mortel - "Mahal Kita Pero" (by Janella Salvador)	**Bride for Rent**; She's Dating the Gangster; Maybe This Time; Starting Over Again
Pop Screen Kiss	Pop Movie Theme Song
**Kim Chiu and Xian Lim**; Kathryn Bernardo and Daniel Padilla; Nadine Lustre and James Reid; Toni Gonzaga and Piolo Pascual	**"Maybe This Time" (by Sarah Geronimo - Maybe This Time)**; "'Til I Met You" (by Angeline Quinto - She's Dating the Gangster); "Starting Over Again" (by Lani Misalucha - Starting Over Again); "Whoops Kirri" (by Vice Ganda - Girl, Boy, Bakla, Tomboy)
Pop Love Team	Pop Kapamilya TV Show
**Kathryn Bernardo and Daniel Padilla**; Kim Chiu and Xian Lim; Toni Gonzaga and Piolo Pascual; Nadine Lustre and James Reid	**The Voice Kids**; Be Careful With My Heart; The Legal Wife; Got to Believe
Pop Kapamilya TV Character	Pop Kapamilya Theme Song
**Jodi Santamaria (Maya - Be Careful With My Heart)**; Angel Locsin (Monica - The Legal Wife); Anne Curtis (Dyesebel - Dyesebel); Paulo Avelino (Patrick - Sana Bukas pa ang Kahapon)	**"Please Be Careful With My Heart"**; "Sana Bukas pa ang Kahapon"; "Moon Of Desire"; "Annaliza"
Pop Female Fashionista	Pop Male Fashionista
**Kim Chiu**; Anne Curtis; Kathryn Bernardo; Julia Barretto	**Enrique Gil**; Daniel Padilla; Vice Ganda; Vhong Navarro
Pop Cover Girl	Pop Pin-up Boy
**Kathryn Bernardo**; Anne Curtis; Angel Locsin; Kim Chiu	**Xian Lim**; JC De Vera; Enrique Gil; Sam Concepcion
Pop Teen Popsies	Pop Female Cutie
**Sharlene San Pedro and Jairus Aquino**; Alexa Ilacad and Nash Aguas; Janella Salvador and Marlo Mortel; Andrea Brillantes and Zaijian Jaranilla	**Nadine Lustre**; Julia Barretto; Liza Soberano; Janella Salvador
Pop Male Cutie	Pop Fans Club
**Darren Espanto**; James Reid; Daniel Matsunaga; Nash Aguas	**Kimxi (Kim Chiu and Xian Lim)**; Kathniel (Kathryn Bernardo and Daniel Padilla); Popsters (Sarah Geronimo); Jadine (James Reid and Nadine Lustre)
Pop Twittezen	Pop Instagrammer
**Kathryn Bernardo**; Anne Curtis; Vice Ganda; Angel Locsin	**Xian Lim**; Anne Curtis; Vice Ganda; Enchong Dee
Pop Selfie	Pop Instavideo
**Kim Chiu**; Anne Curtis; Kathryn Bernardo; Xian Lim	**Vice Ganda**; Enchong Dee; Team Kramer; Xian Lim
Pop YouTube Sensation	
**Kakaibabe Donnalyn Bartolome**; Team Kramer; Gab Valenciano; Ellen Adarna	

== Multiple awards ==
=== Artist(s) with multiple wins ===
The following artist(s) received two or more wins (excluding the special awards):

Awards	Artist(s)
5	Xian Lim (Note: Including shared nominations.)
4	Kim Chiu
3	Sarah Geronimo
3	Kathryn Bernardo
2	Daniel Padilla

*Films/TV Series of the artists are not included in the counts.

=== Artist(s) with multiple nominations ===
The following artist(s) received more than 2 nominations:

Nominations	Artist(s)
10	Xian Lim
10	Kathryn Bernardo
8	Daniel Padilla
7	Vice Ganda
6	Anne Curtis
5	James Reid
4	Sarah Geronimo
4	Nadine Lustre
3	Toni Gonzaga
3	Maja Salvador
3	Angeline Quinto
3	Angel Locsin

*Films/TV Series of the artists are not included in the counts.

== Presenters and performers ==
The following individuals and groups, listed in order of appearance, presented awards.

- Marvin Agustin and Jolina Magdangal
- Doris Bigornia and Dors Bigornia (Aaliyah Belmoro)
- John Lapus and Jason Gainza
