= Oh My G! =

2015 Philippine television drama series

- Title card
- Genre: Christian drama
- Created by: ABS-CBN Studios; Mel Mendoza-del Rosario
- Developed by: ABS-CBN Studios
- Written by: Maria Nikki Jane Bunquin; Kay Conlu-Brondial; Mary Lhuvirizz Martin; Jerry Gracio; Jaymar Castro; Jaja Amarillo
- Directed by: Veronica B. Velasco; Paco Sta. Maria
- Creative director: Willy Lancosay
- Starring: Janella Salvador; Marlo Mortel; Manolo Pedrosa
- Music by: Carmina Cuya
- Opening theme: "I Can" by Janella Salvador
- Composers: Louie Ocampo; Edith Gallardo
- Country of origin: Philippines
- Original language: Filipino
- No. of episodes: 133

Production
- Executive producers: Carlo Katigbak; Cory Vidanes; Laurenti Dyogi; Ginny Monteagudo-Ocampo
- Producers: Grace Ann Bodegon-Casimsiman; Anna Krynessa Rivera; Ellen Nicolas-Criste
- Editor: Kathryn Jerry Perez
- Running time: 31–35 minutes
- Production company: GMO Entertainment Unit

Original release
- Network: ABS-CBN
- Release: January 19 – July 24, 2015

Oh My G! (stylized as oh my G!) is a 2015 Philippine television drama series broadcast by ABS-CBN. Directed by Veronica B. Velasco, it stars Janella Salvador, Marlo Mortel and Manolo Pedrosa. It aired on the network's Prime Tanghali line up and worldwide on TFC from January 19 to July 24, 2015, replacing Give Love on Christmas and was replaced by Ningning.

The series is streaming online on YouTube.

== Plot ==
Sophie Cepeda (Janella Salvador) is a teenager who struggles after both of her parents died. Sophie blamed God for the loss of her loved ones, until G (Leo Rialp) himself appears to Sophie in different forms to enlighten the latter on the obstacles she is facing.

== Cast and characters ==
=== Main cast ===
- Janella Salvador as Sophie Z. Cepeda
- Marlo Mortel as Gabriel "Gabby" Luna
- Manolo Pedrosa as Harry Evangelista

Actors who played as "G"

- Leo Rialp (main)
- Luke Jickain
- Diego Loyzaga
- Pen Medina
- Junjun Quintana
- Boboy Garrovillo
- Dante Ponce

=== Supporting cast ===
- Sunshine Cruz as Maria Lucilla "Lucy" Zaldivar-Santiago
- Janice de Belen as Rose "Teacher-Ninang" Luna
- Kokoy de Santos as Carlos Miguel "Micoy" Arellano
- Yen Santos as Anne Martina Reyes / Sister Marie Paul Cepeda
- Axel Torres as Cyrus Valdez
- Daisy Reyes as Dolly Mercado-Reyes
- John Arcilla as Joe "Daddy-Ninong" Luna
- Maris Racal as Junalyn Barel
- Brigiding as Rene
- Simon Ibarra as Martin Reyes
- Dominic Ochoa as Santino "Santi" Santiago
- Kazel Kinouchi as Maria Luisa "Miley" Z. Santiago
- Patrick Sugui as Patrick Dizon
- Edgar Allan Guzman as Vaughn Luna
- John Steven de Guzman as JC Luna
- Ganiel Krishnan as Helga Barrios
- Issa Litton as Raki Evangelista
- Kate Alejandrino as Roma de la Cruz
- Julia Buencamino † as Amelia "Aimee" Chua
- Paolo Gumabao as Ferdinand "Ferdie" Javier
- Lianne Valentin as Lianne
- Nonie Buencamino as Emmanuel Diaz
- Aina Solano as Jessica Marasigan
- Tom Doromal as Charles Castañeda

=== Guest cast ===
- Eric Quizon as Paul Sanchez Cepeda
- Maricar Reyes as Tessa Zaldivar-Cepeda
- Zara Julianna Richards as young Sophie
- Juan Miguel Tamayo as young Gabby
- Erin Ocampo as Ceres Reyes
- Anna Luna as Sister Marie Bernard
- Wendy Valdez as fake Anne Reyes
- Lollie Mara as Judge Corazon Castañeda
- Bodjie Pascua as Des Reyes

== Production ==
=== Scheduling ===
Initially part of Primetime Bida evening block, Oh My G! was originally planned to replace Bagito. However, the drama later became part of PrimeTanghali block, making it the official successor for Give Love on Christmas. The series was promoted and premiered back-to-back with FlordeLiza and Nasaan Ka Nang Kailangan Kita as part of Kapamilya's "Thank You Day" on January 19, 2015.

On July 7, 2015, teen actress Julia Buencamino, who played Aimee, died after committing suicide prior after the episode filming.

=== Extension ===
The series was supposed to end on July 17, 2015. Oh My G was really down on its last 3 weeks on June 29, 2015, but ABS-CBN extended it for one more week and ended it on July 24, 2015, it was later replaced by Ningning.

=== Reruns ===
It aired reruns on Jeepney TV from November 25, 2019 to February 21, 2020; August 9, 2021 to January 28, 2022; March 4 to June 7, 2024; and March 23, 2026.

== Reception ==
KANTAR MEDIA NATIONAL TV RATINGS (11:30 AM PST)
PILOT EPISODE	FINALE EPISODE	PEAK	AVERAGE	SOURCE
15.4%	16.2%	20.4%	TBA	

== Trivia ==
The title is inspired by a popular catchphrase of Salvador's character from the drama Be Careful with My Heart.

== See also ==
- List of programs broadcast by ABS-CBN
- List of ABS-CBN Studios original drama series
