= My Fairy Tail Love Story =

- Theatrical release poster
- Directed by: Perci Intalan
- Screenplay by: June Robles Lana; Denoy Navarro-Punio; J.K. De Leon
- Produced by: Lily Y. Monteverde; Roselle Y. Monteverde
- Starring: Janella Salvador; Elmo Magalona; Kiko Estrada
- Cinematography: Mycko David
- Edited by: Maynard Pattaui
- Music by: Arlene Flerida Calvo
- Production companies: Regal Entertainment; The Idea First Company
- Distributed by: Regal Entertainment
- Release date: February 14, 2018
- Running time: 115 minutes
- Country: Philippines
- Language: Filipino

My Fairy Tail Love Story is a 2018 Filipino romantic fantasy film, directed by Perci Intalan, starring Janella Salvador, Elmo Magalona and Kiko Estrada. It is produced by Regal Entertainment. It was released on February 14, 2018, by Regal Entertainment.

== Plot ==
Chantel (Janella Salvador) is a spoiled brat cursed to be a mermaid after she disturbed corals under the sea. With the help of her best friend Noah (Elmo Magalona), they go on a journey to find her Prince Charming who she believes will break the curse she's in.

== Cast ==
=== Main ===
- Janella Salvador as Chantel Quejada
- Elmo Magalona as Noah
- Kiko Estrada as DJ Ethan

=== Supporting ===
- Kiray Celis as Missy
- Dominic Ochoa as Robert Quejada
- Dimples Romana as Natasha Quejada
- Kakai Bautista as Myrna
- Rubi Rubi as Nana Gurang
- Miles Ocampo as Anna

== Release ==
The film released its 1-minute Official Teaser on August 31, 2017. The full trailer of the film was released on January 19, 2018. The film was released on February 14, 2018, under Regal Entertainment.

It is Rated G by the Movie and Television Review and Classification Board (MTRCB).

== Critical response ==
My Fairy Tail Love Story received mixed to positive reviews from critics.

PEP.ph praised the film for presenting a modernized fairy tale that avoids clichés and offers a romantic fantasy with a fresh twist. Janella Salvador's performance was described as “easy to root for,” while Elmo Magalona was noted for being “funny and down‑to‑earth.” The review highlighted some limitations in the romantic chemistry between the leads and considered Kiko Estrada's role as the antagonist miscast. Certain subplots were described as underdeveloped and resolved too conveniently.

PelikulaMania described the film as a “Filipino and millennial” reinterpretation of a mermaid story. The review highlighted the visuals—especially transitions from beach to city to underwater scenes—and praised the chemistry between Salvador and Magalona. It also suggested the film could have benefited from greater focus on Magalona's character.

The Philippine Star noted the film's ambition, praising Salvador's mermaid portrayal and Magalona's more grounded performance. The review characterized the film as a coming‑of‑age romance with a moral about privilege and self‑discovery, but commented that some thematic elements were not fully realized.

Overall, critics considered My Fairy Tail Love Story a light, visually appealing romantic fantasy. Praise focused on the leads’ performances, the film's fresh approach to a mermaid narrative, and its visual presentation, while criticisms highlighted uneven character development and certain narrative conveniences.
