= Mano Po 7: Chinoy =

2016 Philippine drama film

- Theatrical release poster
- Directed by: Ian Loreños
- Screenplay by: Senedy Que
- Produced by: Lily Y. Monteverde
- Starring: Richard Yap; Jean Garcia; Janella Salvador; Enchong Dee; Marlo Mortel; Jake Cuenca; Jessy Mendiola; Kean Cipriano
- Cinematography: Lee Meily
- Edited by: Tara Illenberger
- Music by: Cesar Francis Concio
- Production company: Regal Films
- Distributed by: Regal Entertainment; Regal Multimedia
- Release date: December 14, 2016
- Running time: 123 minutes
- Country: Philippines
- Language: Filipino
- Box office: ₱70 million

Mano Po 7: Chinoy (simplified Chinese: 菲华人; traditional Chinese: 菲華人; pinyin: Fēi huárén; Pe̍h-ōe-jī: Hui-hôa-lâng) is a 2016 Filipino drama film directed by Ian Loreños, and the seventh and final installment of the Mano Po film series. The film starring Richard Yap, Jean Garcia and Enchong Dee. The film was produced by Regal Entertainment. It tells the story of a modern Chinese Filipino family. Beneath the facade of a typical well-off Chinese Filipino family, it also tackles the struggles of family life as well as how they managed to reunite themselves as one. The film was shown in theatres starting December 14, 2016, but was delayed due to insistent public demand that the film was re-run in theatres starting February 8, 2017. The film starred Richard Yap, making him the first male main protagonist in the Mano Po film series. It was also the second Mano Po film that was not directed by Joel Lamangan who directed Mano Po, Mano Po III: My Love, Mano Po 4: Ako Legal Wife, Mano Po 5: Gua Ai Di and Mano Po 6: A Mother's Love.

== Plot ==
Wilson and Debbie's wedding anniversary is interrupted by the antics of their problematic son Wilson "Son" Jr., a drug and alcohol addict. Fed up, Wilson sends his son to a rehabilitation facility, where the latter falls in love with a fellow patient, Jocelyn. After graduating, Son and Jocelyn get engaged but the latter dies of an overdose while searching for Son at a bar.

Meanwhile, Debbie begins an affair at her jewelry shop with a customer named Marco but later calls it off. An incensed Marco comes to the Wong residence and starts a disturbance, leading to Wilson's discovery of the affair and his estrangement with Debbie. Their daughter, Carol, begins music school but is rescued by a classmate from a maniac professor, leading her to shift courses. Wilson also deals with the return of his estranged homosexual brother Jason and caring for their elderly mother Erlinda. Throughout the film, Wilson reflects on his struggles growing up and how he has raised his family.

Shortly after Jocelyn's funeral, Son and Carol separately urge their father to reconcile with Debbie, which he does. Wilson allows Jason to reconnect with their mother and assume her care in her twilight years.

Years later, an elderly Wilson and Debbie reflect on their life together, with Wilson finding himself at peace

== Cast ==
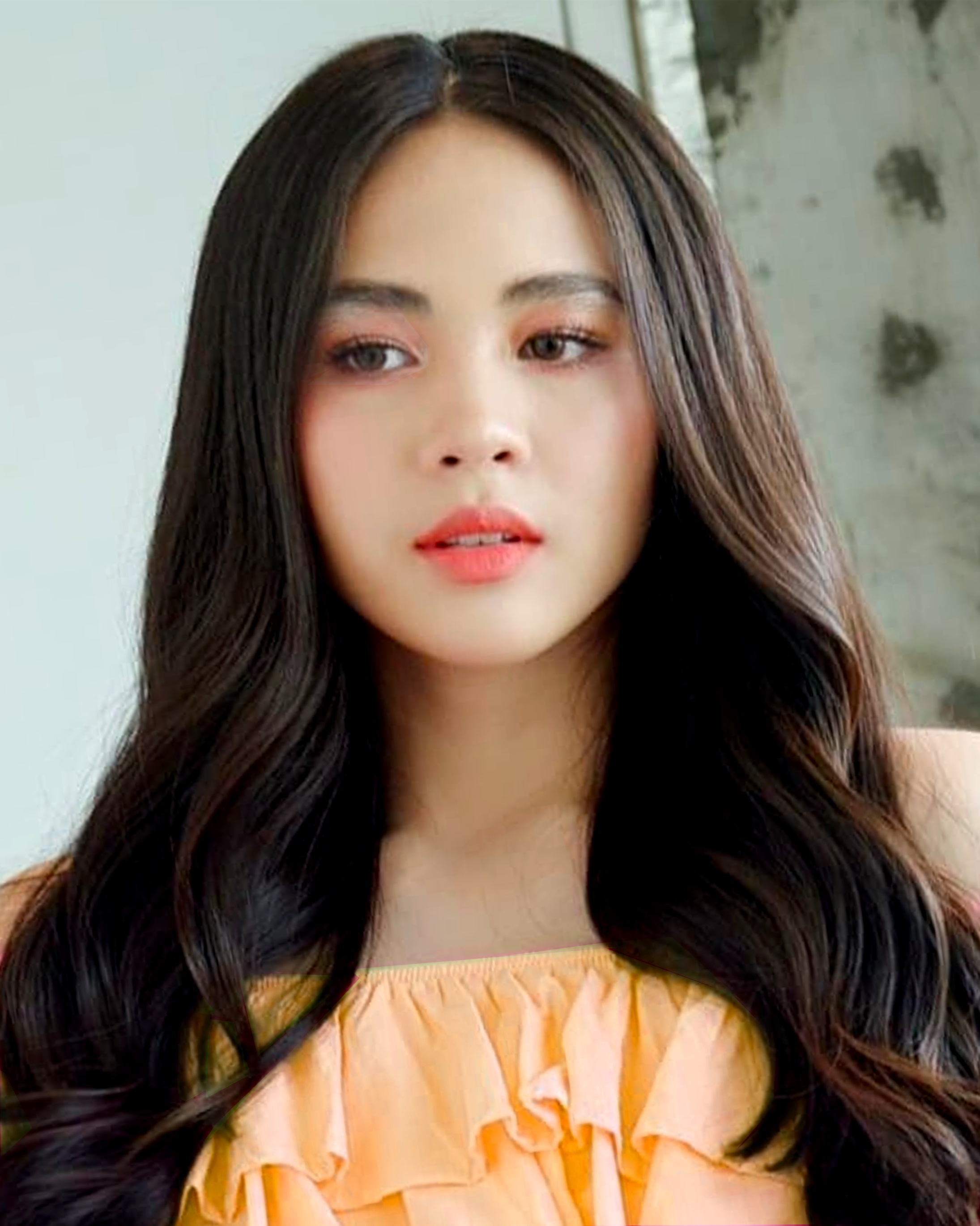
Janella Salvador portrays Caroline "Carol" Wong

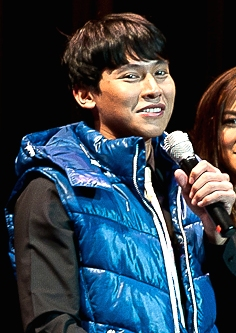
Enchong Dee portrays Wilson "Son" Wong, Jr.

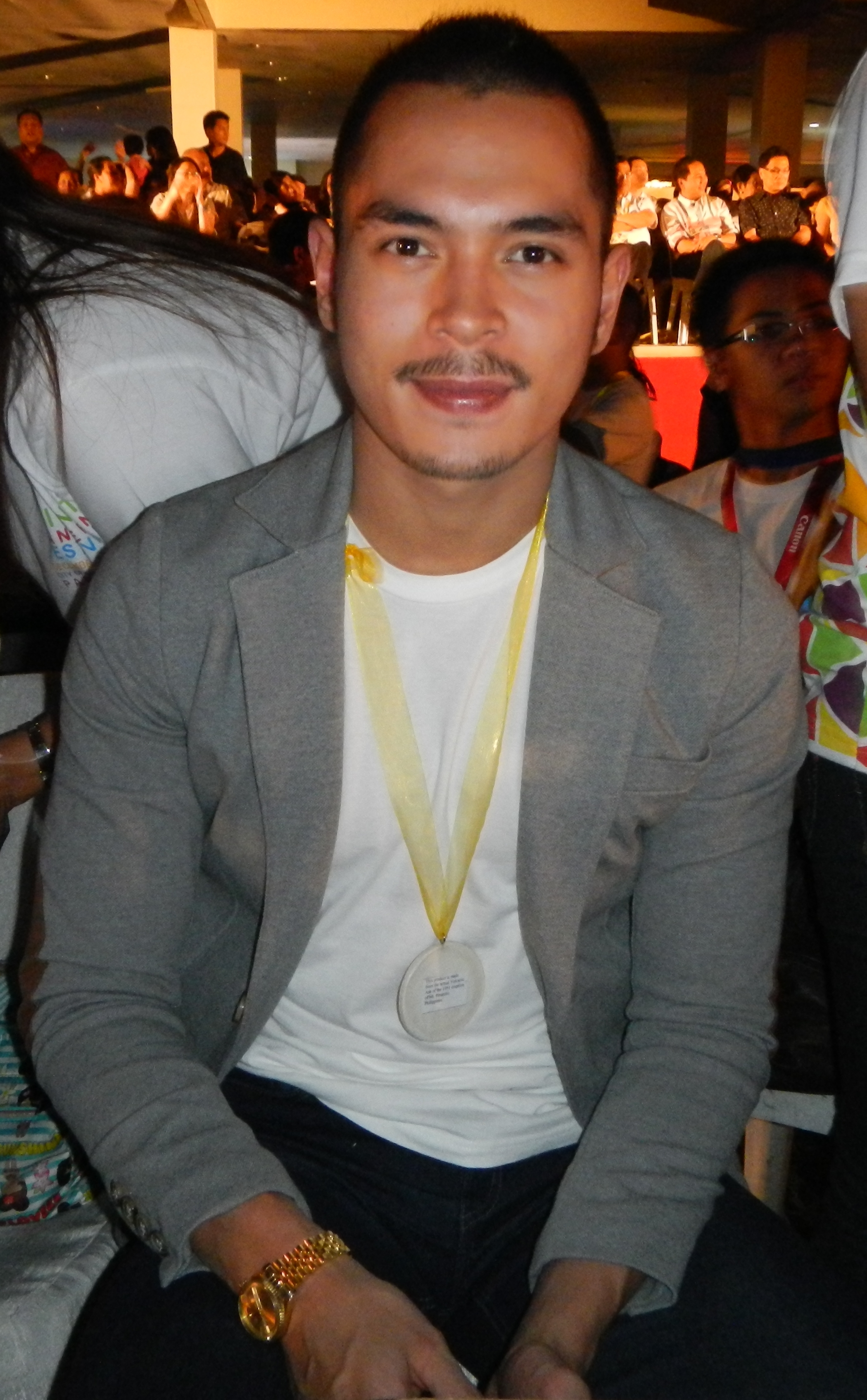
Jake Cuenca portrays Marco (Debbie's customer)

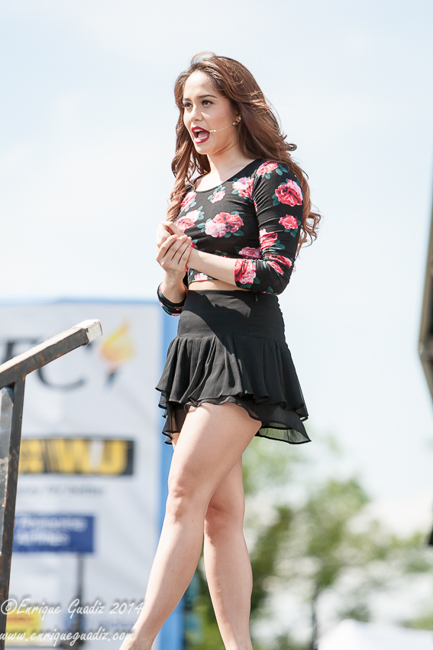
Jessy Mendiola portrays Jocelyn C. Lee (Wilson, Jr.'s love interest)

- Richard Yap as Wilson Wong
- Marlo Mortel as Henry Santos
- Jean Garcia as Deborah "Debbie" Lim-Wong
- Janella Salvador as Caroline "Carol" Wong
- Enchong Dee as Wilson "Son" Wong, Jr.
- Jessy Mendiola as Jocelyn C. Lee
- Jana Agoncillo as Catherine Wong
- Kean Cipriano as Denver Vera
- David Chua as young Manuel U. Wong
- Rebecca Chuanunsu as Erlinda Wong
- Eric Quizon as Jason Wong
- Jake Cuenca as Marco
- Pinky Amador as Jocelyn's mother
- Rosalind Wee as Auntie Rosa

== Box office ==
Together with Star Cinema's The Super Parental Guardians and OctoArts Films, M-Zet Productions & APT Entertainment's Enteng Kabisote 10 and the Abangers, Mano Po 7: Chinoy failed to make it into the Magic 8 of the 2016 Metro Manila Film Festival. It was shown on December 14, 2016, and was shown in almost 200 cinemas nationwide. The movie earned a decent ₱4 million on its opening day. It earned ₱70 million on its entire run.

== See also ==
- Mano Po (Filipino film series)
- Mano Po
- Mano Po 2
- Mano Po III: My Love
- Ako Legal Wife
- Mano Po 5: Gua Ai Di
- Bahay Kubo: A Pinoy Mano Po!
- Mano Po 6: A Mother's Love
