= Haunted Mansion (2015 film) =

Film by Jun Robles Lana

- Theatrical release poster
- Directed by: Jun Robles Lana
- Screenplay by: Jun Robles Lana; Elmer Gatchallian
- Story by: Jun Robles Lana; Renato Custodio; Marlon Miguel
- Produced by: Lily Y. Monteverde; Roselle Y. Monteverde
- Starring: Janella Salvador; Marlo Mortel; Jerome Ponce; Iza Calzado; Janice de Belen
- Cinematography: Carlo Mendoza
- Edited by: Benjamin Tolentino; Ilsa Malsi
- Music by: Francis Concio
- Production company: Regal Entertainment
- Distributed by: Regal Studios
- Release date: December 25, 2015
- Running time: 100 minutes
- Country: Philippines
- Language: Filipino

Haunted Mansion (formerly Retreat House and originally titled Rest House) is a 2015 Filipino supernatural horror film written and directed by Jun Robles Lana, starring Janella Salvador, Marlo Mortel, Jerome Ponce, Iza Calzado and Janice de Belen. It is the first installment in the Haunted film series, and is followed by a second film, Haunted Forest. It was the debut film of Janella Salvador after her successful stint on television. It was an official entry to the 41st Metro Manila Film Festival, and was released on December 25, 2015.

The film follows a group of high school kids who are staying in an old mansion for a retreat activity. Their stay turns into a nightmare when they accidentally cross paths with the mansion's dark past, involving the dead owner and her wicked agendas.

The film received generally positive reviews from film critics praising its cinematography, visual effects, production design and musical score. The film's cast was also praised for their performances.

== Plot ==
After a student retreat, a young boy was startled by the screams of his teacher. He goes inside a mansion, where he sees apparitions of a woman in black and a man burned to death, before stumbling across his teacher's dead body.

Ella, Faye and Adrian (who harbors feelings for Ella) are students of a prestigious school. After class, Ella encounters a ghost in the locker room, before getting insulted by three students, Megan, Jessie and Allison. The next day, Jacob (who also has feelings for Ella) hands her a box of chocolate and is eventually revealed that Megan placed roaches inside. On the day of the retreat, Ella and her classmates were accompanied by their teachers Ms. Gonzales and Ms. Taas with the school chaplain, Father Anthony to a mansion in the province. They were welcomed by the mansion's caretakers, Selya and Anding, who explains the mansion's history; the house was formerly owned by a rich woman, Amara Lobregat with her younger sister Veronica, both who lived and died during the Japanese Occupational Period. Ella dreams about a woman in black committing suicide by hanging herself.

The next night, Ella, Faye and Adrian were chased by a ghostly figure which was later revealed to be another prank pulled by Megan. The next night, Ella faints in fright after seeing Jaime's ghost. Thinking that it's part of Megan's pranks, they were forced to stay another day, while the rest of the class, including Ms. Taas, return home. Ella confessed to Adrian that she has a third eye, an ability she possessed since she was little, which caused the death of her father. Megan, Steve and Jack decided to ghost hunt and leave a phone inside the chapel booth. A storm hits the province, resulting in a power outage while rainwater begins to enter the mansion. While listening to the voice note, Steve hears a weeping woman on the phone and encounters Jaime before getting caught by another violent ghost who severed his tongue.

Trying to call for help, Ms. Gonzales hears the woman's voice note and sees Jaime as well. Freaked out, she suffers an asthma attack; Faye stays, listens to the note and sees Jaime too. The ghost who killed Steve reappears. They hear their screams and when they run to help, they find their corpses with their tongues ripped out. Ella and her friends decided to listen to the voice note as they might discover the truth. The record turns to Veronica confessing that she wasn't really raped by Jaime, and instead, they were lovers. Meanwhile, Amara has hidden desire for Jaime and after discovering that Veronica and Jaime are pregnant, she influences everyone to take Jaime down. Veronica finds out that Amara has been practicing witchcraft and with her power of sorcery, she managed to manipulate the people to kill Jaime. Veronica decided to commit suicide after failing to save Jaime; eventually Amara died too. With this, anyone who heard the note will die and have their tongues taken off by Amara, as she wanted to keep the truth buried within the mansion.

Jaime reappears and points at Amara approaching them. Ella, Jacob and Adrian carry Father Anthony; Megan, Jessie, Allison and Jack flee the mansion; Selya and Anding were killed by Amara who blasted them through a window. Amara follows Ella and her friends, prompting them to leave Father Anthony, who is then killed. Megan, Jessie, Allison and Jack crossed a flooded area wherein Allison, Jessie and Jack get pulled down by a supernatural force. Megan is caught by Amara surfacing up the water and is killed.

Ella, Adrian and Jacob were the only ones left alive. Ella uses her third eye and is drawn into a vision of the afterlife and encounters Jaime and Veronica, with the former instructing her to destroy the necklace that Amara wears inside of her coffin. Ella and her friends head into a private area where Amara's corpse was buried; Amara kills Jacob and Adrian. When Amara confronts Ella in the mansion chapel, Ella pulls out her tongue using a crucifix, and is injured.

Ella was next seen with her mother and siblings in her house, presumably rescued. She suffered from an amnesia, due to the impact of her head injury. Three months later, Ella wakes up to find Amara has returned. The two fight and a wounded Ella places a rosary in Amara's neck, ending her existence eternally. The film ends as an unconscious Ella opens her eyes eerily.

== Cast ==
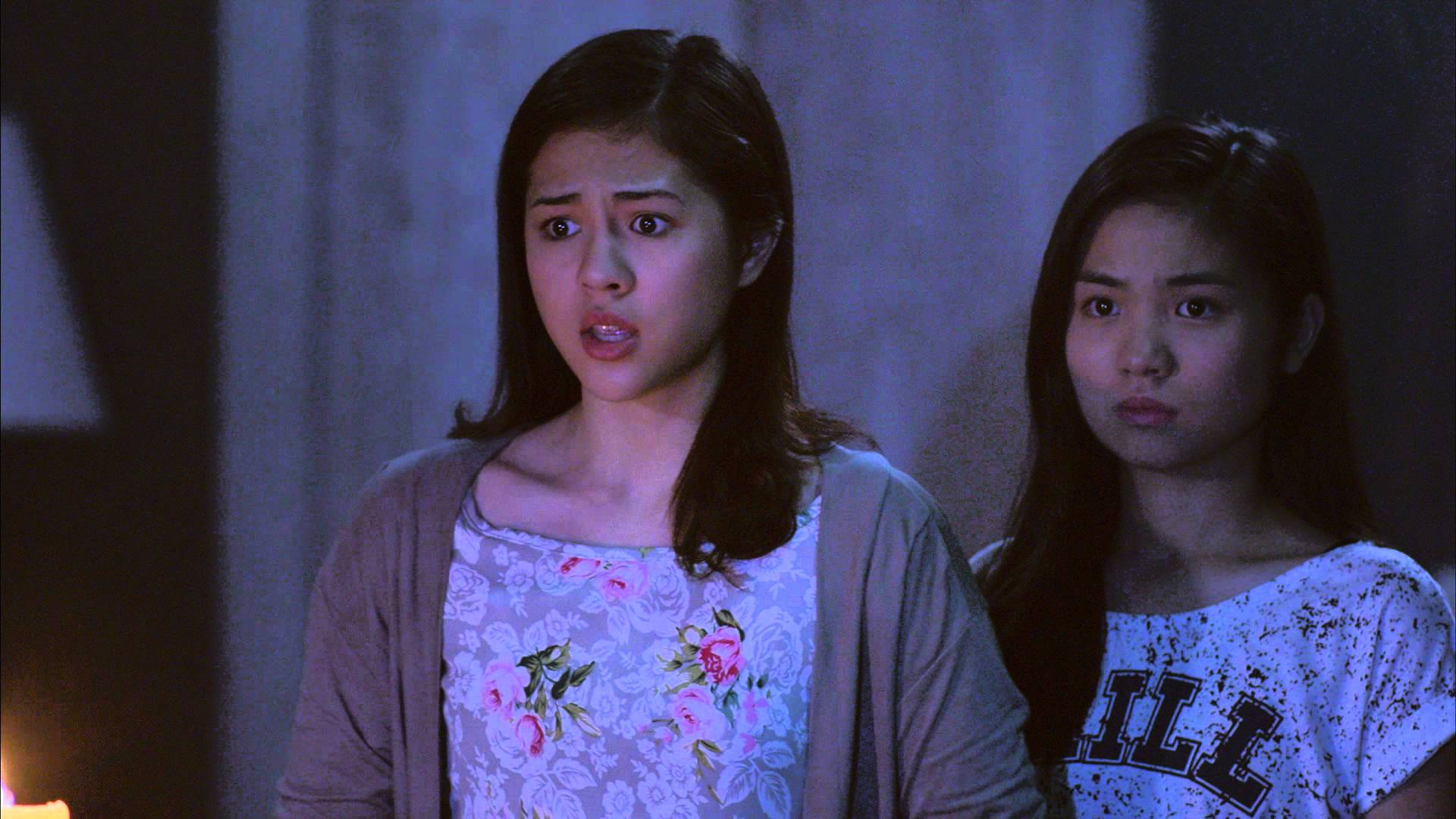
Janella Salvador and Sharlene San Pedro portraying Ella and Faye.

=== Main ===
- Janella Salvador as Ella Jimenez - a girl who can see dead people around her. She is Amara's enemy and the only one who survives the murder.
- Marlo Mortel as Adrian Ular - Ella's best friend who likes her. He dies in the hands of Amara after getting pulled down the ground.
- Jerome Ponce as Jacob Hanilar - one of Ella's friends and also a rival of Adrian. He dies after getting thrown against a tree by Amara.
- Janice de Belen as Miss Gonzales - one of the school teachers in charge of the mansion retreat. She dies after getting her tongue taken off by Amara.
- Iza Calzado as Donya Amara Lobregat - the rich deceased owner of the Lobregat mansion and Veronica's older sister. She is revealed to be a witch and uses her black magic to commit such atrocities.

=== Supporting ===
- Dominic Ochoa as Father Anthony
- Sharlene San Pedro as Faye Zobela
- Ingrid dela Paz as Megan Fabregas
- Devon Seron as Allison Alcantara
- Eliza Pineda as Jessie Mendoza
- Phytos Ramirez as Jack Olivares
- Paolo Gumabao as Steve Balez

=== Guest ===
- LJ Reyes as Veronica Lobregat
- Joem Bascon as Jaime
- Lilet as Elly
- Allan Paule as Manny
- Vangie Labalan as Manang Selya
- Sue Prado as Miss Taas
- Archie Adamos as Mang Anding
- Mara Lopez as Teacher

== Production ==
The script for the film, originally entitled Rest House, took five years to perfect. According to Lily Monteverde, Regal Entertainment decided to enter the film for the 2015 Metro Manila Film Festival instead of another installment of the Shake, Rattle & Roll series. The budget that would have been allotted for a Shake, Rattle & Roll film was allotted for Haunted Mansion instead. All requests of director Jun Lana were granted by Regal and the production design was deemed very expensive by Monteverde. Monteverde said that the film has the biggest budget among the horror entries at the 2015 Metro Manila Film Festival.

=== Filming ===
Principal photography for the film began as early as April 2015. Director Jun Lana, said that the film is not rushed so it may be improved. The film was shot in Cabuyao, Laguna in Marcos Twin Mansion owned by the Marcoses.

The house was made to look older for the film while the venue was made to look brand-new for the flashback scenes set in the 1950s. A hole as big as a swimming pool was dug for a two-minute scene. Additional shooting days were made for the final touch ups.

=== Creepy experiences on the set ===
Paolo Gumabao, who plays the character Steve in the movie, shared during the press conference that he, his stylist, and his personal assistant (PA) were "ghost hunting" on the second floor of the mansion on a break from filming. He and his stylist went into a room, only to have the door close behind them –there was no wind and his PA was at the opposite end of the hallway outside. Actress Ingrid dela Paz said she, Sharlene San Pedro, and Eliza Pineda, all heard a little boy talking on the second floor too. Meanwhile, after the press conference, Janella told reporters that her mother and brother were inside a tent when they heard an old man moaning .

== Release ==
The film was released on December 25, 2015, under Regal Entertainment as an official entry to the Metro Manila Film Festival. The film had a special screening at Greenhills Theatre Mall on December 18.

=== Marketing ===
On October 25, 2015 Regal Films released the first teaser trailer of the film. It was followed by the first official trailer of the film which was released on November 26. Another trailer was released by Regal Films on December 14 to promote the film.

== Reception ==
=== Box office ===
The film opened in more than 40 cinemas and earned ₱10 million in its first day of showing.The film landed on 3rd spot on its opening day.

On December 27, 2015, according to the Metropolitan Manila Development Authority (MMDA) the film is at the 3rd spot from the box office with ₱29 million.

=== Critical reception ===
==== Special screening ====
Haunted Mansion received positive reviews during its special screening at Greenhills Theatre Mall on December 18, 2015.

A review from jobonsol.net that "I had to close my eyes because it is really scary".

==== Official release ====
Haunted Mansion received generally positive reviews from film critics. The film was praised for its cinematography and special effects, Lana's direction was given praises too.The cast was praised for its good performances in the film as well.

A film critic from Ely's Planet gave a rating of 7/10 saying,"DESPITE SOME WEAK points, Haunted Mansion is a breath of fresh air to Metro Manila Film Festival (MMFF) as it takes the audience to various shocking surprises in the course of around two hours."

Starmometer also gave a positive review stating that, "The film succeeds in building up tension and keeping the story from being predictable. The technical aspects are very strong from sounds to cinematography, and from make-up to production design. The lighting and the location itself create a pretty decent horror experience. The main cast, on the other hand, is all right. The standout in the cast, however, is Iza Calzado who established a scary presence in the second half of the film." Starmometer gave a rating 8.5/10.

On top of it, this horror film has outstanding cinematography, an excellent musical scoring and a fairly commendable production design.

- Pablo Tariman from PHILSTAR

Oggs Cruz from Rappler says that in spite of the familiarity of the premise and title, "'Haunted Mansion' is something else." He even added that " Carlo Mendoza’s cinematography is wonderfully precise, lending credibility to the atmosphere that Lana seeks to create. Mendoza knows how to use both light and shadows to evoke a certain sense of unease. The film’s maturely constructed imagery is assisted by a sound design that does not rely on noise and glaring orchestrations to scare. While Lana still employs shock tactics to keep the film’s audience at the edge of their seats, the film is nevertheless deliberate in its pacing. It creeps meaningfully, initially concentrating on the banal concerns of its characters before thrusting its purpose of betraying innocent beliefs with a climax that haphazardly has the lives of all the characters, whether they are good or bad, endangered with explicit savagery."

== Accolades ==
Award	Category	Recipient	Result
41st Metro Manila Film Festival	Best Supporting Actress	Iza Calzado	Nominated
41st Metro Manila Film Festival	Best Production Design	Jerann Ordinario	Nominated
41st Metro Manila Film Festival	Best Visual Effects	Imaginary Friends	Nominated
32nd PMPC Star Awards for Movies	New Movie Actress of the Year	Janella Salvador	Won
32nd PMPC Star Awards for Movies	New Movie Actor of the Year	Marlo Mortel	Won

== See also ==
- List of ghost films
