= Kiray Celis =

Filipino actress and comedian (born 1995)

Kiray
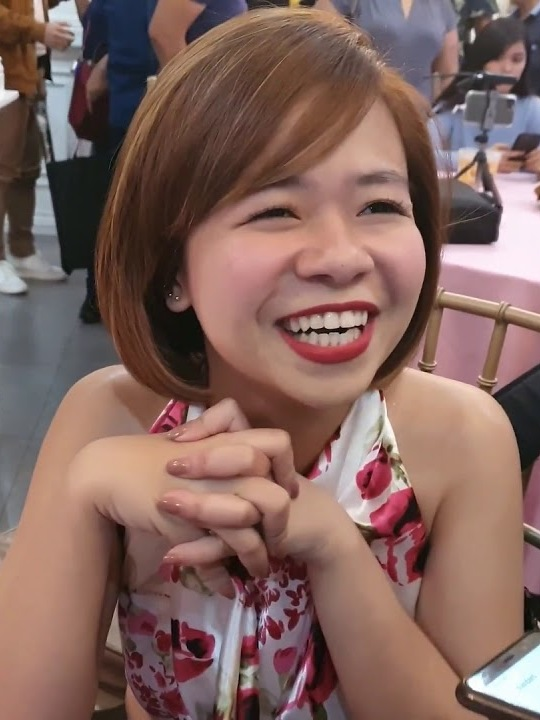
- Celis in 2020
- Born: Johanna Ismael Celis; July 29, 1994 (age 32); Philippines
- Occupations: Actress; businesswoman
- Years active: 1999–present
- Agents: Star Magic (2005–2018); Sparkle (2018–present)
- Spouse: Stephan Estopia (m. 2025)
- Children: 1

Johanna Ismael "Kiray" Celis-Estopia (Tagalog: [kiˈɾaɪ ˈsɛlis]; born July 29, 1994) is a Filipino actress and businesswoman.

== Career ==
=== Acting ===
Celis was first discovered when she joined a contest called Muntíng Miss U of Magandang Tanghali Bayan at the age of 3. Soon after the contest, she joined the noontime show as the youngest cast member. Her first movie appearance was in the movie Pera o Bayong (not da TV) starring the entire MTB cast.

In 2005, Celis was chosen as one of the cast members in the children's gag show Goin' Bulilit that aired every Sunday. She was on the show until she graduated in 2007.

Celis starred in a supporting role as Desiree on the TV series Mara Clara starring Kathryn Bernardo and Julia Montes. She then again starred as Britney in the youth-oriented show Growing Up, again with Bernardo and Montes, being paired with Winston. Her most recent appearance was when she played the role of Whitney Munoz in the comedy youth-oriented show, the Sunday afternoon series Luv U.

After 19 years of staying in ABS-CBN, Celis transferred to GMA Network as she signed a contract with GMA Artist Center (now Sparkle) on December 20, 2018. She joined the cast of the Jennylyn Mercado and Gabby Concepcion-topbilled rom-com series Love You Two.

=== Business ===
In 2018, Celis opened a restaurant called Chicks and Fins.

== Personal life ==
In 2025, Celis married Stephan Estopia, whom she had been in a relationship with since 2021. In April 2026, Celis announced that they were expecting their first child, a son.

In June 2026, Celis sparked concern among fans after sharing that she had been hospitalized during her pregnancy, though she did not disclose the reason for her hospital visit.

In November 2026, Celis gave birth to her son.

== Filmography ==
=== Television ===
Year	Title	Role	Type of role
1999	Magandang Tanghali Bayan	Herself	Contestant; recurring mainstay
2004	Wansapanataym: Esep-Bata		
2005	Goin' Bulilit	Herself	Main cast; various roles
2005	Kampanerang Kuba	Young Magdalena Durano	Guest
2005	Mga Anghel na Walang Langit	Pinky	Guest appearance
2006	Komiks Presents: Si Piolo at si Lorelei	Maya	Main role
2006	Komiks Presents: Bampy		Special appearance
2006	Maalaala Mo Kaya: Salamin	Kiray	Episode role
2007	Kemis: Ke Misis Umaasa	Kiray	
2007	Love Spell Presents: Cindy-rella	Lisa	Supporting role
2009	Maalaala Mo Kaya: Relo	Lorimel	
2010	Kokey @ Ako	Young Bambam	
2010	Maalaala Mo Kaya: Gitara	Choir Member	
2010–2011	Mara Clara	Desiree Francisco	Main role
2011–2018	ASAP	Herself	Co-host and performer
2011	Precious Hearts Romances Presents: Mana Po	Young Brandi de la Paz	Main role
2011	100 Days to Heaven	Young Girlie	Lead role
2011	Wansapanataym Presents: Flores de Mayumi	Mayumi	
2011	Wansapanataym Presents: Buhawi Jack	Mayumi	
2011–2012	Growing Up	Britney Gunay	Lead role
2012	Regal Shocker Presents: Teatro	Ella	
2012	Toda Max	Jeng Jeng	
2012	Maalaala Mo Kaya: Upuan	Pintak	
2012–2016	Luv U	Whitney Muñoz	Lead role
2013	Wansapanataym Presents: Petrang Paminta	Marikit	Co-lead role
2013	Maalaala Mo Kaya: Tsubibo	Brenda	Main role
2014	Maalaala Mo Kaya: Notebook	Reshee	Lead role
2015	Maalaala Mo Kaya: Class Card	Joy	
2015	Ipaglaban Mo!: Pinekeng Anyo	Minnie's best friend	
2015–2016	#ParangNormal Activity	Lani	Supporting cast (season 1); Main cast (season 2)
2015–2017	FPJ's Ang Probinsyano	Mitch	
2017	Wansapanataym Presents: Annika PINTAsera	Froggie	Voice role
2018	Sana Dalawa ang Puso	Anya	
2019	Maynila: Lend Me Your Love	Mayumi	Lead role
2019	Eat Bulaga!	Herself	Segment: BOOM!
2019	Wish Ko Lang: Kuya, 'Wag Po	Joan	
2019	Dear Uge	Cora/Kira	Episode: "Ganda Ka?"
2019	Love You Two	Darling Innocencio	Supporting cast
2019	Pepito Manaloto	Gwen	Episode: "Pepito DragoNia"
2021	Owe My Love	Everlyn "Evs" Morales-Guipit	Supporting Cast
2021	Stories from the Heart	Meanne Rivera	Episode: "Love on Air"
2022	Return to Paradise	Raichu	Supporting cast
2024	My Guardian Alien	Marites	Supporting cast

=== Film ===
Year	Title	Role
2000	Pera o Bayong (Not da TV!)	Kiray
2006	Kapag Tumibok Ang Puso: Not Once, But Twice	Precious
2007	Apat Dapat, Dapat Apat: Friends 4 Lyf and Death	Lily Katakutan
2008	Supahpapalicious	Young Nymfa/Inday
2009	BFF: Best Friends Forever	Mean Girl
2011	The Howl & The Fussyket	Alexi Lumibao
2011	First Kiss	Jek-jek
2012	The Mommy Returns	Amethyst "Amy" P. Martirez
2012	Born to Love You	Sampaguita Liwanag
2012	Kimmy Dora and the Temple of Kiyeme	Young Charito Go Dong-hae
2012	I Do Bidoo Bidoo: Heto nAPO Sila!	Jazzy Polotan
2012	Si Agimat, si Enteng Kabisote at si Ako	Kiray
2013	Bangungot	
2013	Girl, Boy, Bakla, Tomboy	Snow White
2014	Echoserang Frog	
2014	Da Possessed	Kiki
2014	Somebody to Love	Chloe
2014	Shake, Rattle & Roll XV	Lovely
2015	Crazy Beautiful You	Kim
2015	Stars Versus Me	
2016	Love is Blind	Fe
2016	I Love You to Death	Gwendalyn
2016	The Super Parental Guardians	Liza de Lima
2018	My Fairy Tail Love Story	Missy
2018	Bakwit Boys	Tanya
2018	Wander Bra	Amazona
2018	Class of 2018	Venus
2019	Kiko and Lala	Miracle
2020	D'Ninang	Lorena

== Awards ==
Year	Award-giving body	Category	Work	Result
2008	GMMSF Box-Office Entertainment Awards	Most Popular Female Child Performer	—N/a	Won
