= Kumusta =

South Korean-Philippine reality show

- Genre: Reality; Cooking show
- Directed by: Park Nae-ryong
- Starring: Ji Chang-wook; Jodi Sta. Maria; Janella Salvador; Francine Diaz; Arci Muñoz; JP Anglo; Kim Yumol
- Countries of origin: South Korea; Philippines
- Original languages: English; Filipino; Korean
- No. of episodes: 10

Production
- Producer: Crystal Jacinto
- Production location: Gangnam District
- Production companies: E&S Partners

Original release
- Network: TV5
- Release: 24 May – 28 June 2026

Kumusta (also stylized as Kumusta?; transl. How are you?) is a reality television and cooking show. The series is produced by a South Korean production team and broadcast on TV5. The program follows South Korean actor Ji Chang-wook and several Filipino celebrities as they manage a pop-up restaurant in South Korea.

The show premiered on May 24, 2026, and is available for streaming on Viu in Philippines, Hong Kong, Singapore and other selected regions. It concluded on June 28, 2026, with 10 episodes.

== Premise ==
The title of the show is derived from the Tagalog greeting "kumusta", which translates to "how are you?". The show centers on a cultural exchange between the Philippines and South Korea through culinary arts. The cast members temporarily operated a Filipino restaurant named "Kumusta Café" located in the Gangnam District of Seoul. During the production, the cast worked daily shifts ranging from 12 to 16 hours over a period of seven days. The menu featured traditional Filipino dishes such as inasal, kare-kare, sisig, and roasted pig known as lechon.

== Cast ==
The restaurant was managed by a combined cast of South Korean and Filipino personalities.

- Ji Chang-wook
- Jodi Sta. Maria
- Janella Salvador
- Francine Diaz
- Arci Muñoz
- Chef JP Anglo
- Chef Kim Yumol

=== Guest cast ===
- Kim Min-seok
- Kim Myung-soo
- Seo In-guk

== Production ==
South Korean director Park Nae-ryong directs the program. Crystal Jacinto serves as a producer for the show. Filming took place in Seoul in late 2025. As part of the filming process, the cast purchased local Korean meat from a wet market. The cast also prepared a special meal for South Korean chef and restaurateur Choi Hyun-seok. During one of the filming days, cast member Janella Salvador performed a musical cover of the song "With a Smile" by the Philippine band Eraserheads. Ji Chang-wook participated actively in the kitchen, specifically assisting with the preparation and roasting of the lechon. Following the completion of filming, Ji gifted Sta. Maria a pair of Gentle Monster sunglasses.
