= Be Careful with My Heart =

2012–14 Philippine television drama series

- Title card from July 9, 2012 to March 25, 2014
- Genre: Romantic comedy; Family; Slice of Life
- Created by: ABS-CBN Studios; Mel Mendoza-del Rosario
- Developed by: ABS-CBN Studios
- Written by: Denise O'Hara; Nika Layson; Jimuel dela Cruz; Dexter Hemedez; Alpha Kristine Fortun
- Directed by: Jeffrey R. Jeturian; Mervyn B. Brondial; Theodore Boborol
- Starring: Jodi Sta. Maria; Richard Yap; Mutya Orquia; Janella Salvador; Jerome Ponce
- Music by: Carmina Cuya
- Opening theme: "Please Be Careful With My Heart" by Jodi Sta. Maria and Richard Yap
- Composer: Jose Mari Chan
- Country of origin: Philippines
- Original languages: Filipino; English
- No. of episodes: 618

Production
- Executive producers: Carlo Katigbak; Cory Vidanes; Laurenti Dyogi; Ginny Monteagudo-Ocampo
- Producers: Ellen Nicolas Criste; Grace Ann Bodegon-Casimsiman; Narciso Y. Gulmatico, Jr.; Keila Marie Celso; Ruchel Covacha; Edyl Macy Delos Santos
- Production locations: Metro Manila, Philippines; Rizal, Philippines; Laguna, Philippines
- Cinematography: Neil Daza
- Editors: Joy Buenaventura; Ray-Ann Endaya; Shyra Marie Joaquin; Billy Joe Karganilla; Joseph Nathaniel Lopez; Maydelle Marcial; Ding Mora; Geomar Triño
- Running time: 45 minutes
- Production company: GMO Entertainment Unit

Original release
- Network: ABS-CBN
- Release: July 9, 2012 – November 28, 2014

Related
- Sana Dalawa ang Puso

Be Careful with My Heart is a Philippine television drama romance series broadcast by ABS-CBN. Directed by Jeffrey R. Jeturian, Mervyn B. Brondial and Theodore Boborol, it stars Jodi Sta. Maria and Richard Yap. It aired on the network's Prime Tanghali line up and worldwide on TFC from July 9, 2012, to November 28, 2014, and was replaced by Give Love on Christmas.

Be Careful with My Heart is the longest-running morning drama series and one of ABS-CBN's most successful programs due to its immense popularity and critical acclaim, spawning albums, concerts, and worldwide tours. The series has been aired in regions of Africa, around Asia, the Middle East, and South America. It is the fourth Philippine television series to be shot in high definition format after Rounin, Minsan Lang Kita Iibigin, and Budoy. The series has received several accolades, including best drama and ensemble honors from the Anak TV Seal Awards, Golden Dove Awards, Catholic Mass Media Awards, Gawad Tanglaw Awards, and PMPC Star Awards for Television.

== Synopsis ==
Maya dela Rosa (Jodi Sta. Maria), her older sister Cristina, and Cristina's son Cho are introduced as tour guides in their hometown of San Nicolas, with their mother running a souvenir shop. They often make less than what their living expenses and household repairs require. Cristina hopes to work at sea, while Maya dreams of becoming a flight attendant. One rainy night after trying to fix the roof, Cristina breaks her leg and cannot complete her schooling to become a seafarer. With a large medical bill, Maya decides to work overseas for two years to help her family. Upon arrival in Manila, she discovers that the woman who offered her a job abroad swindles her. Maya is stuck in Manila with no money or place to go. Relentless, she allows no one to stop her, not even the handsome, wealthy widower Richard Lim (Richard Yap), who reminds her of her shortcomings.

Ironically, Richard is her last hope because of his influence in the airline industry. He offers Maya a temporary job as his youngest daughter's (who has selective mutism) nanny in exchange for his help. Maya agrees to become his maid and nanny. Upon entering the Lim home, she gets involved in the private lives of Richard and his three problematic children: Luke (Jerome Ponce), Nikki (Janella Salvador) and Abby (Mutya Orquia).

Maya realizes that since Richard's wife died, the family's joy died with her, hence their problems. Maya is tasked bringing Richard closer to his children and eventually rebuilding the family. However, in repairing their broken hearts, Maya encounters bigger challenges that test her determination and, more importantly, her heart. While doing her job, she falls in love with the children and their father.

== Cast and characters ==
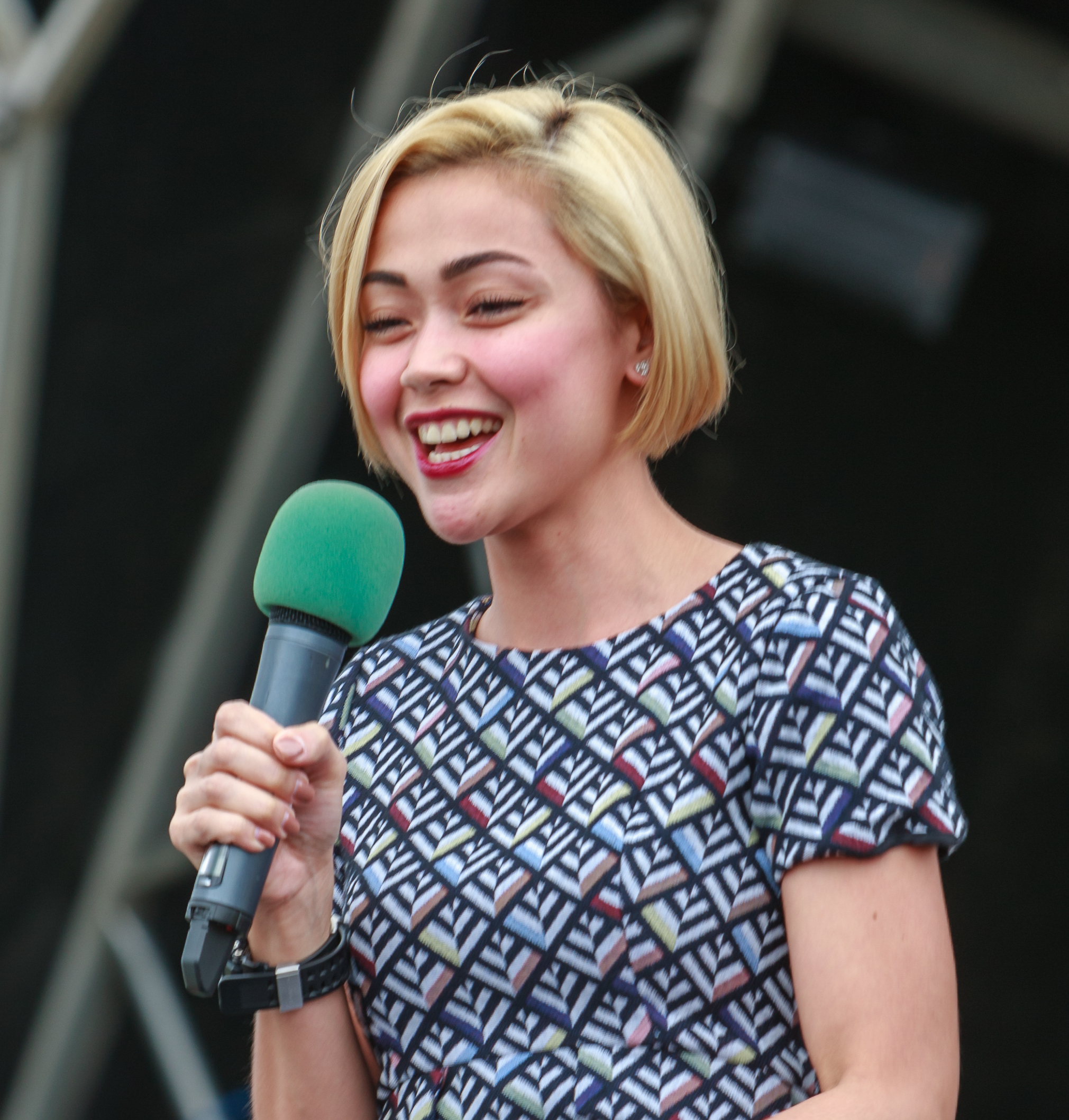
Jodi Sta. Maria portrays Maya dela Paz dela Rosa-Lim.

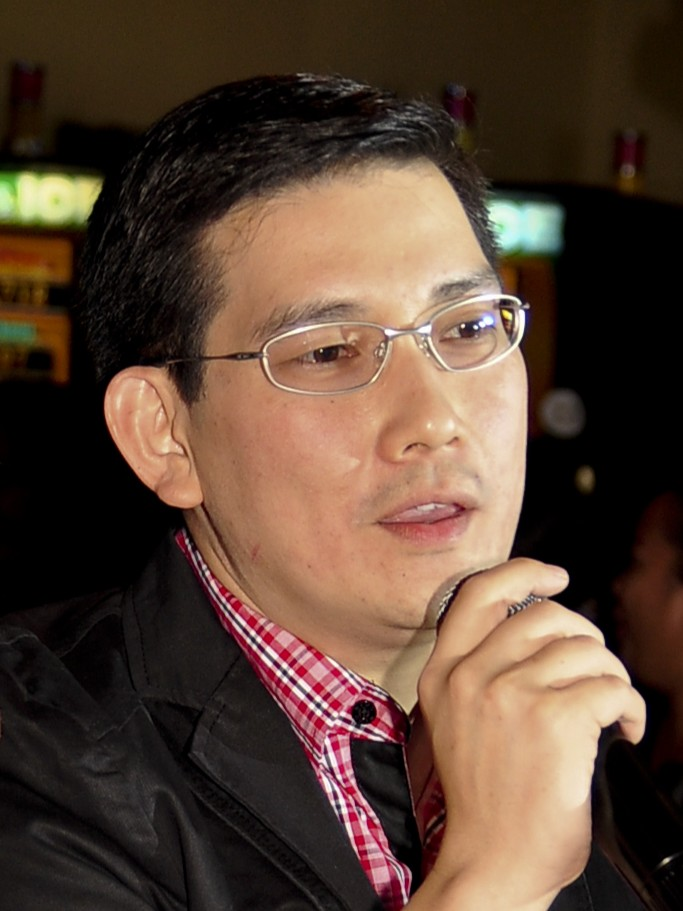
Richard Yap portrays Richard "Sir Chief" Lim.

=== Main cast ===
- Jodi Sta. Maria as Maya dela Paz dela Rosa-Lim – At 25, Maya is a simple, idealistic provincial girl who dreams of becoming a flight attendant but in a twist of events ends up becoming a nanny for a wealthy family in Manila. She took the job in exchange of an educational scholarship from her boss, Richard Lim. She is very family-oriented and will do everything to make her family's life in the province comfortable. She has an innocent charm, yet confident, and has a very positive attitude in life. Later in the series, she marries Richard and together they had twins Luke and Nikki, Abby, Sky and Sunshine.
- Richard Yap as Richard "Sir Chief" Lim – He is the owner and president of the famous Lim Aviation Services, an aircraft maintenance repair and overhaul business. Known for being a cold, harsh and strict boss, he has one son and two daughters namely: Luke, Nikki and Abby. A widower of five years since losing his wife Alexandra in a plane crash, he hires Maya to take care of his youngest daughter after she rescues Abby from an incident at the airport. Maya endearingly calls him "Ser Chief." He later becomes a father again to the twins Luke and Nikki, Abby, Sky and Sunshine. upon marrying Maya.
- Mutya Orquia as Abigail Ruth "Abby" Lim – The youngest of the three, Abby had difficulty expressing herself when her mother died. Richard has spoiled Abby and she has become overly sensitive when she hears fights and arguments in the family. Richard ultimately decided to have her home schooled because they are afraid of Abby's condition. The Lim family hired many nannies in the past and no one lasted even a week because of Abby's difficult ways. But when Maya saves her from an accident at the airport, Abby finds an instant ally in the simple girl from Mindoro.
- Janella Salvador as Nikki Grace "Nik-Nik" Lim – She is the middle child and the spitting-image of her mother. After the death of her mom, Nikki tries to overcompensate for her loss and tries to take charge of her siblings. She always yearns for her father's attention and at first, she has taken a dislike for Maya, Abby's noisy, new nanny. Eventually, she warms up to Maya. She often speaks in Taglish. Later in the series, she develops a crush on her brother's best friend, Nicolo.
- Jerome Ponce as Luke Andrew Lim – When his mom died, Luke became the silent and rebellious eldest child. Aloof as he may seem, he cares for the welfare of his sisters but he tries to hide it if he can.
- Elisha Delos Santos as Sunshine D. Lim – The baby daughter of the Lim and Dela Rosa family, and the twin sister of Sky.
- Jeo Aquines as Sky D. Lim – The baby son of the Lim and Dela Rosa family, and the twin brother of Sunshine.

=== Supporting cast ===
- Aiza Seguerra as Cristina Rose "Kute" dela Rosa – Maya's sister, Teresita and Arturo's daughter and Cho's mother; called Kute – derived from "Kuya" and "Ate". Together with Jeff, they own the Little Pards Chibugan.
- Sylvia Sanchez as Teresita dela Paz-dela Rosa – Maya and Kute's mother, Mamang's daughter, Arturo's wife and Cho's grandmother.
- Lito Pimentel as Arturo dela Rosa – Maya and Kute's father, Teresita's husband, Mamang's son-in-law and Cho's grandfather.
- Gloria Sevilla† as Felicidad "Manang Fe" Marcelo-Alejo – Richard's nanny when he was young and the head maid of the household. Later married to Mang Anastacio.
- Divina Valencia as Conchita "Mamang" dela Paz – Kute and Maya's loving grandmother, Teresita's mother, Arturo's mother-in-law and Cho's great-grandmother.
- Rosario "Tart" Carlos as Dorina "Doris" Malasig – Sabel's close friend and a maid; later Abby's nanny in the Lim family.
- Viveika Ravanes as Isabel "Sabel" Fortuna-Lumaque – Doris' close friend and a cook/maid in the Lim family. Later married Gerry the Security Guard.
- Joan Marie Bugcat as Yaya Lea – A newly added nanny/maid for the Lim Family.
- Karen Aiza Alimagno as Magda Dominguez – Kute's childhood best friend.
- JM Ibañez as Pocholo "Cho" dela Rosa – Jeff and Kute's son.
- Micah Muñoz as Jose Mari "Joma" Adriano – The driver of the Lim family.
- Nathan Lopez as Emmanuel "Emman" Castro – Maya's friend/roommate.
- Marlo Mortel as Nicolo Angelo "Mallows/Nic-Nic" Cortez – Luke's best friend and Nikki's love interest. Nikki calls him "Mallows". Aira calls him "Nic-Nic".
- Paul Jake Castillo as Simon Gabriel Corpuz – Maya's childhood friend, who used to court her.
- Shy Carlos as Maria Rosario Jonina "Joni" Quijano – Luke's co-intern at Lim Aviation Services; later became his girlfriend.
- Jeremiah "Bagito" Roxas as Ron-Ron – Bullied Cho at first; later became friends.
- Vandolph Quizon as Ramon Marcelino "Lino" – Jeff's cousin, who also works in the karinderia.
- Kelly Gwayne dela Cruz as Aira Denise Mendoza – Nicolo's best friend.
- Claire Ruiz as Josephine "Joey" Acosta – Luke's friend/ex-girlfriend. Also the former President of West Teatro in Northwest Hills.
- Mai-Mai Adriano as Megan – Nikki's classmate/friend.
- Abigail Francisco Macapagal as Stacy Gutierrez – Nikki's classmate/friend.
- Arvic Tan as Louie – Luke and Nicolo's friend.
- McCoy de Leon as Iñigo Cabanatan – Trouble-maker during high school; later became Luke and Nicolo's friend.
- AJ Muhlach as Amiel Sebastian – Senior transferee in Nikki's school; later belongs to Luke's tropa.

=== Recurring cast ===
- Noel Trinidad as Don Roberto Lim – Richard's father and grandfather to the Lim children.
- Marissa Delgado as Doña Esmeralda Lim – Richard's mother and grandmother to the Lim children.
- Carlos "Rusty" Salazar† as Mang Anastacio Alejo – Manang Fe's love interest; later became her husband.
- Tom Rodriguez as Jeffrey "Jeff" D. Macavinta – Kute's friend and Cho's father; he later left the series (following his transfer to GMA for his role on the then-upcoming drama, My Husband's Lover.)
- Maricar Reyes as Rafaella "Rafi" Alcantara – Richard's best friend.
- Assunta De Rossi as Katrina "Ina" Ruiz – Maya's boss who has a crush on Richard.
- Kalila Aguilos as Liza – Richard's former secretary.
- Johan Santos as Wilson de Juan – Maya's classmate.
- Diamond Shen as Jonah – Maya's classmate.
- Robert Ortega as Fred – Richard's assistant that moved and work to another company.
- Ya Chang as Engineer Yamaguchi – Richard's employee.
- Jerico Redrico as Lloyd
- Pinky Amador as Zenaida Belmonte – Maya's teacher.
- Cris Villanueva as Atty. Ryan Molina – Richard's friend and attorney.
- Terence Baylon as Elmer – Driver of a neighboring house near the Lim household. Sabel and Doris have a crush on him.
- Mark Luz as Engineer Gutierrez
- Hazel Faith dela Cruz as Edz Viray – A flight attendant and Maya's friend.
- Chris Bugoy as Brian Emmanuel "Bugoy"
- Bryce Viray as Lance
- Carla Guevarra as Ms. Pacheco - Maya's instructor of Time Airways.
- Amparo Sistereales as Jennifer Calandra - Maya's instructor of Time Airways.
- Sier Edward Atienza Lao, Jade Gultiano, Pol Aron Casas, Erwin Strydom and Prince Ivan Nacachi as Tropa ni Iñigo – Iñigo's bad influenced friends.
- Bart Guingona as Charles - one of the Board of Directors of LAS.
- Joel Molina as Gerry Lumaque - a security guard who married Sabel.

=== Guest cast ===
- Nick Lizaso as Don Julio Demornay
- Sunshine Garcia as Stephanie
- Joyce So as Anna Martinez
- Dionne Monsanto as Teacher Emy – Abby's home-school teacher.
- Jed Montero as Teacher May Anne
- Joy Viado† as Senyang
- Melai Cantiveros as Yaya Gemma
- Karen Leslie Dematera as Gina
- Princess Manzon as Karisa
- Agatha Tapan as Yaya Melinda
- Bianca Saldua as Monica – Maya's friend.
- Cai Cortez as Luisa
- Meg Imperial as Sarah
- Andre Tiangco as Airline Purser
- Jomari Umpa as Pao
- Yanna Asistio as Angge
- Elisse Joson as Cheska
- John Arcilla as Wedding Priest
- Jose Mari Chan as Wedding Singer
- Jenine Desiderio as Wedding Singer
- Bodjie Pascua as Ramon Francisco
- Lollie Mara as Norma Melendez
- Irma Adlawan as Victoria Reyes
- Leo Rialp as Antonio Garcia
- Kazel Kinouchi as Georgina Barrel
- Ketchup Eusebio as Dr. Tim Gonzaga
- Aleck Bovick as Lucinda Quijano – Joni's mother.
- Jon Lucas as Michael
- Jopay Paguia as Thea Lindsay Angeles – Kute's friend.
- Pamu Pamorada as Clarita
- Liza Diño as Mercy Selgado
- Jenny Miller as Betsy
- Katya Santos as Camille
- Art Acuña as Interviewer
- Mark Jayson Bañez as Boris – Pizza Delivery Boy and Doris' love interest.
- Luis Manzano as Capt. James Ventura Jr. – A pilot who works for Time Airways. He is also the son of the CEO of Time Airways.
- Ina Raymundo as Celeste Madrigal – LAS Former COO and Ralph Madrigal's Wife
- Regine Tolentino as Corrine Celeste – Maya and Richard's wedding planner.
- Edward Mendez as Charlie Ramirez – Rafi's boyfriend.
- Kathryn Bernardo as young Fe
- Daniel Padilla as young Anastacio
- Mike Austria as Board of director
- Ping Medina as young Arturo dela Rosa
- Beauty Gonzalez as young Teresita dela Rosa
- Zeny Zabala as Mila
- Dante Ponce as Don Fernando

== Episodes ==
Year	Episode numbers	Episodes	First aired	Last aired	Peak	Average
2012	1–124	124	July 9, 2012	December 31, 2012	27.4% (Episode 78)	22.74%
2013	125–382	258	January 1, 2013	December 31, 2013	31.3% (Episode 143)	22.91%
2014	383–618	236	January 1, 2014	November 28, 2014	21.1% (Episode 420)	16.06%
Series Average						20.57%

== Production ==
=== Development ===
Before the show premiered, major Philippine TV dramas were traditionally saved for the evening. To test whether a non-primetime drama could build an audience, ABS-CBN introduced the show as an experimental morning series. Promotional teasers and trailers began airing across the network in late June 2012. At a press conference in July 2012, the show's creators explained that although the series features the classic rich-meets-poor storyline, they chose to give it a lighthearted tone.

=== Casting ===
For the lead roles, Jodi Sta. Maria revealed in interviews that she was not the initial choice for the role of Maya Dela Rosa, marking a transition from her typical heavy dramatic roles to romantic comedy. Similarly, the creative team considered several actors for Sir Chief before offering Richard Yap his first leading role. Working against tight deadlines, the team saw a natural fit in Yap following his breakthrough performance as Papa Chen in My Binondo Girl. The pairing proved highly successful, generating unexpected on-screen chemistry and audience acclaim. Meanwhile, the actors portraying the Lim siblings were cast through open auditions.

=== Filming ===
Pila, Laguna, served as the fictional town of San Nicolas, while Antipolo, Rizal, was used for the Lim family mansion. In late 2012, production took place in Baguio City for a vacation sequence.

Conceptualization for the wedding sequence began in January 2013, with business unit head Ginny Ocampo consulting a professional wedding planner and a Catholic priest to maintain authenticity. Church scouting commenced in April 2013; while the production team initially selected the Paoay Church in Ilocos Norte, logistical constraints led them to choose the Taal Basilica in Batangas instead, with reception scenes filmed at Villa Escudero in Quezon province. Director Jeffrey Jeturian filmed the wedding ceremony continuously and without cuts using a multi-camera setup of at least seven cameras. In mid-November 2013, the cast and crew traveled to Japan to shoot the honeymoon sequence.

Additional filming took place in Vigan, Ilocos Sur, for the series finale.

== Release ==
=== Broadcast ===
Title card from June 25, 2014 to November 28, 2014

Be Careful With My Heart aired on ABS-CBN's daytime programming block and globally via TFC from July 9, 2012 to November 28, 2014. Although initially intended for a single 13-week season, overwhelming viewer popularity and high ratings led to multiple extensions. The series ran for 618 episodes over two years, making it one of the longest-running daytime dramas in Philippine television history. Mirroring the online coverage for Walang Hanggan and Princess and I, ABS-CBN leveraged the show's success by releasing exclusive behind-the-scenes features and interviews on its website.

After a two-year run, TV Patrol announced on September 25, 2014, that the series would conclude on November 28, 2014. The finale was branded "Global Kapit-Bisig Day" by ABS-CBN to mark its simultaneous broadcast across the Philippines and globally on the TFC website, which was immediately followed by a live farewell special. The last episode was extended to one hour from 11:15 AM to 12:15 PM, temporarily preempting The Singing Bee and reruns of Princess Sarah.

==== International broadcasts ====
- Kenya — NTV
- Malaysia — Media Prima (TV3)
- Nigeria — Televista TV (DStv Channel 194 and GOtv Channel 15) and ONTV Nigeria (UHF 41)
- Tanzania — StarTV Africa
- Uganda — Bukedde TV
- Vietnam — TodayTV VTC7

=== Reruns ===
Due to insistent public demand, Be Careful With My Heart Sabado Rewind premiered on September 15, 2012 at 10:30 AM, as the first Philippine weekday TV show to air a weekly replay. It aired every Saturday before It's Showtime until November 16, 2013, when it was replaced by live NBA broadcasts.

Be Careful with My Heart has enjoyed multiple reruns on the cable channel Jeepney TV since its original ABS-CBN run ended. These aired on October 17, 2016, December 22, 2017, and August 20, 2018. The 2018 rerun was temporarily halted on February 1, 2019, due to election-related restrictions involving a cast member running in the midterm elections. Broadcasts resumed on May 19, 2019, with Sunday airings at 5:00 PM and weekday episodes at 6:00 PM beginning May 20, 2019.

Be Careful with My Heart re-aired for its 10th anniversary celebration on Kapamilya Channel's Kapamilya Mornings programming block, Kapamilya Online Live and A2Z on July 18, 2022, on at 9:00 AM replacing Flower Crew: Dating Agency. On August 8, the rerun's timeslot was changed to 10:00 AM (same timeslot on its former Saturday Recap block) in exchange with Magandang Buhay until October 20, 2023.

=== Streaming ===
Be Careful With My Heart is available for streaming on iWantTFC. ABS-CBN also made full episodes and playlists available on its official YouTube channel. Years after its original broadcast, the show regularly trends and ranks among iWantTFC's top 10 most-watched programs.

In May 2020, six years after the series ended, ABS-CBN hosted a half-hour virtual cast reunion on iWant. The special served as a prelude to a live stream of the show's 2013 "Fairytale Wedding" episode across YouTube and Facebook.

=== Other media ===
The series received an extensive home media release from ABS-CBN, spanning over 50 DVD volumes. Each set included Tagalog audio, English subtitles, and exclusive bonus content, such as The Making of Be Careful With My Heart. Special standalone releases were produced, including the Be Careful With My Heart Fairy Tale Wedding DVD.

In partnership with ABS-CBN Publishing, Inc., several tie-in souvenir magazines were also released. These included The Fairytale, which featured exclusive photos and behind-the-scenes articles detailing Maya and Ser Chief's wedding, as well as Maya's Baby Book, published to commemorate the arrival of the Lim family's twins. Capitalizing on the show's immense popularity, ABS-CBN produced a wide variety of merchandise, including apparel, character-themed items, signature colognes, and autographed teddy bears.

== Soundtrack ==
The Be Careful With My Heart original soundtrack features popular romantic tracks performed by the show's lead stars and notable OPM artists, along with minus-one versions for sing-along use. The primary soundtrack released in 2012 includes the drama's main theme song with the same title performed by lead stars Jodi Sta. Maria and Richard Yap, as well as an alternate version by Juris and Sam Milby, it is later utilized as the official and main theme song for the 2026 beauty pageant-themed satirical comedy and surivival thriller film, Red Crown (produced by GMA Pictures). The album earned Gold certification from the Philippine Association of the Record Industry. In 2013, Richard and Maya (The Wedding Soundtrack) was released to mark the wedding storyline of the lead characters. This was followed in 2014 by Be Careful with My Heart (The Lullaby Album), which featured tracks such as "Brahms Lullaby" to complement the show's later family-oriented themes. A special promotional single, "Kapit Bisig," performed by the show's ensemble cast, was also released in 2014 in celebration of the series and its grand finale.

Be Careful With My Heart: The Album

Soundtrack album by Various Artists
- Released: 2012
- Genre: OPM pop
- Length: 33:34
- Label: Star Music
- Producer: ABS-CBN Film Productions, Inc.

Be Careful With My Heart: The Album
No.	Title	Artist	Length
1.	"Please Be Careful With My Heart (Regine Velasquez and Jose Mari Chan cover)"	Jodi Sta. Maria and Richard Yap	3:40
2.	"When You Say Nothing At All (Ronan Keating cover)"	Jodi Sta. Maria and Richard Yap	3:41
3.	"Kaba (Tootsie Guevara cover)"	Jodi Sta. Maria	4:00
4.	"Torete (Moonstar88 cover)"	Jodi Sta. Maria	3:26
5.	"When You Say Nothing At All (Ronan Keating cover)"	Richard Yap	3:42
6.	"The Way You Look Tonight (Fred Astaire cover)"	Richard Yap	3:52
7.	"Sorry Na, Pwede Ba? (Rico J. Puno cover)"	Richard Yap	2:47
8.	"I'll Be There For You (Martin Nievera cover)"	Aiza Seguerra	4:17
9.	"Please Be Careful With My Heart (Regine Velasquez and Jose Mari Chan cover)"	Juris and Sam Milby	4:09

Richard and Maya (The Wedding Soundtrack)

Soundtrack album by Various Artists
- Released: 2013
- Genre: OPM pop
- Length: 27:36
- Label: Star Music
- Producer: ABS-CBN Film Productions, Inc.

Richard and Maya (The Wedding Soundtrack)
No.	Title	Artist	Length
1.	"When I Met You (Apo Hiking Society cover)"	Juris	4:20
2.	"When I Fall in Love (Nat King Cole cover)"	Yeng Constantino	4:17
3.	"Paano"	Bugoy Drilon	4:33
4.	"I Finally Found Someone (Barbra Streisand and Bryan Adams cover)"	Radh and Thor	3:37
5.	"Kahit Maputi Na Ang Buhok Ko (Rey Valera cover)"	Nyoy Volante	3:17
6.	"Chinito (Yeng Constantino cover)"	Jodi Sta. Maria	4:00
7.	"Please Be Careful With My Heart (Regine Velasquez and Jose Mari Chan cover)"	Jodi Sta. Maria and Richard Yap	3:32

Be Careful With My Heart (The Lullaby Album)

Soundtrack album by Various Artists
- Released: 2014
- Genre: OPM pop
- Length: 14:23
- Label: Star Music
- Producer: ABS-CBN Film Productions, Inc.

Be Careful With My Heart (The Lullaby Album)
No.	Title	Artist	Length
1.	"Angel of God"	Mutya Orquia	1:12
2.	"Laging Ikaw"	Jodi Sta. Maria	3:42
3.	"Brahms Lullaby - English Version"	Jodi Sta. Maria	1:50
4.	"Now I Lay Me Down to Sleep"	Jodi Sta. Maria and Richard Yap	1:46
5.	"Brahms Lullaby - Tagalog Version"	Jodi Sta. Maria	1:50
6.	"Someone's Waiting for You (Shelby Flint cover)"	Aiza Seguerra	4:03
7.	"Please Be Careful With My Heart (Regine Velasquez and Jose Mari Chan cover)"

Singles
Year	Album
2014	Kapit Bisig: Released: 2014; Label: Star Music; Artist: All Star Cast, Aiza Seguerra, Janella Salvador, Jodi Sta. Maria, Richard Yap

== Reception ==
=== Critical response ===
The series received praise for its performances, screenplay, and lighthearted approach to family life. Critics noted its departure from traditional teleseryes, which are typically defined by heavy melodrama. Media commentators noted that the show changed the landscape of morning television in the Philippines, shifting audience viewing habits by proving a late-morning drama could achieve primetime-level success.

The Philippine Daily Inquirer wrote that the "scripting feels truer and less shamelessly melodramatic," a sentiment echoed by Kenya Buzz, which called the show's refreshingly non-formulaic approach a welcome change. Louie Jon A. Sanchez of The Philippine Star commended the series for offering "a treat of wholesome kilig and a story that returns to a theme long eschewed from—that of Filipino family life tackled in lightness." He noted that "this love that took time to blossom created the wholesome kilig effect that is quite missed, apparently, in current soap operas," arguing that this lighthearted, comic style should be explored further in Philippine television. PEP and The Summit Express praised its well-drawn plot, casting, and promotion of a positive outlook. Both outlets noted that the series left a mark on local pop culture through its catchphrase "Kapit-Bisig!," which came to symbolize unity and family resilience.

=== Viewership ===
Be Careful with My Heart premiered on July 9, 2012, in the pre-noontime slot. According to data from Kantar Media, the series debuted with a nationwide television rating of 15.2%, defeating its rival program, GMA Network's Chef Boy Logro: Kusina Master which got 8.8%. On January 25, 2013, the series achieved its peak nationwide rating of 31.3%, marking an all-time highest rating on daytime Philippine television by any non-sports or non-live show. The series concluded its run in November 2014, recording a final nationwide rating of 19.6%. Internationally, the series gained popularity across Southeast Asia, particularly in Malaysia and Vietnam. In Malaysia, the broadcast averaged 1.6 million viewers everyday on Media Prima, which was considerably high for foreign content.

Kantar Media National TV Ratings (10:45AM / 11:15AM / 11:45AM PST)
Pilot Episode	Finale Episode	Peak	Average
15.2% July 9, 2012 (10:45AM PST)	19.6% November 18, 2014 (11:45AM PST)	31.3% January 25, 2013 (11:45AM PST)	20.57%

=== Awards and nominations ===
As one of ABS-CBN's most successful and groundbreaking daytime series, it earned many awards from major local award-giving bodies—such as the Anak TV Seal Awards, Box Office Entertainment Awards, Catholic Mass Media Awards, Gawad Tanglaw Awards, Golden Dove Awards, and PMPC Star Awards for Television, winning categories like Best Drama Series and acting accolades for its lead stars Jodi Sta. Maria and Richard Yap. It was also recognized internationally, winning honors at events like the Vietnam Green Star Awards.

Award	Year	Category	Recipient(s)	Result	Ref(s).
Anak TV Seal Awards	2012	Favorite Anak TV Makabata Star	Jodi Sta. Maria	Won	
Anak TV Seal Awards	2012	Favorite Anak TV Makabata Star	Richard Yap	Won	
Anak TV Seal Awards	2012	Most Well-Liked TV Program	Be Careful with My Heart	Won	
Anak TV Seal Awards	2013	Favorite Anak TV Makabata Star	Jodi Sta. Maria	Won	
Anak TV Seal Awards	2013	Favorite Anak TV Makabata Star	Richard Yap	Won	
Anak TV Seal Awards	2013	Most Well-Liked TV Program	Be Careful with My Heart	Won	
Anak TV Seal Awards	2014	Favorite Anak TV Makabata Star	Jodi Sta. Maria	Won	
Anak TV Seal Awards	2014	Favorite Anak TV Makabata Star	Richard Yap	Won	
Anak TV Seal Awards	2014	Most Well-Liked TV Program	Be Careful With My Heart	Won	
ASAP Pop Viewers' Choice Awards	2012	Pop Kapamilya TV Character	Jodi Sta. Maria	Nominated	
ASAP Pop Viewers' Choice Awards	2012	Pop Kapamilya Theme Song	Please Be Careful With My Heart	Nominated	
ASAP Pop Viewers' Choice Awards	2012	Pop Kapamilya TV Show	Be Careful with My Heart	Nominated	
ASAP Pop Viewers' Choice Awards	2012	Pop Soundtrack	Be Careful With My Heart (Lullaby Album)	Nominated	
ASAP Pop Viewers' Choice Awards	2013	Pop Kapamilya TV Character	Jodi Sta. Maria and Richard Yap	Nominated	
ASAP Pop Viewers' Choice Awards	2013	Pop Kapamilya Theme Song	Please Be Careful With My Heart	Nominated	
ASAP Pop Viewers' Choice Awards	2013	Pop Kapamilya TV Show	Be Careful with My Heart	Nominated	
ASAP Pop Viewers' Choice Awards	2013	Pop Soundtrack	Be Careful With My Heart	Nominated	
ASAP Pop Viewers' Choice Awards	2013	Pop Breakthrough Star	Jerome Ponce	Nominated	
ASAP Pop Viewers' Choice Awards	2013	Pop Breakthrough Star	Janella Salvador	Won	
ASAP Pop Viewers' Choice Awards	2014	Pop Kapamilya TV Character	Jodi Sta. Maria	Won	
ASAP Pop Viewers' Choice Awards	2014	Pop Kapamilya Theme Song	Please Be Careful With My Heart	Won	
ASAP Pop Viewers' Choice Awards	2014	Pop Kapamilya TV Show	Be Careful with My Heart	Nominated	
ASAP Pop Viewers' Choice Awards	2014	Pop Soundtrack	Be Careful With My Heart (Lullaby Album)	Nominated	
ASAP Pop Viewers' Choice Awards	2014	Pop Female Cutie	Janella Salvador	Nominated	
ASAP Pop Viewers' Choice Awards	2014	Pop Teen Popsies	Janella Salvador and Marlo Mortel	Nominated	
Catholic Mass Media Awards	2014	Best Drama Series	Be Careful with My Heart	Won	
Gawad Tanglaw Awards	2013	Best TV Series	Be Careful with My Heart	Won	
Gawad Tanglaw Awards	2013	Best Ensemble Performance	Be Careful with My Heart Cast	Won	
GMMSF Box Office Entertainment Awards	2013	Most Popular Loveteam on Television	Jodi Sta. Maria and Richard Yap	Won	
GMMSF Box Office Entertainment Awards	2014	Most Popular Loveteam on Television	Jodi Sta. Maria and Richard Yap	Won	
GMMSF Box Office Entertainment Awards	2014	Most Popular Female Child Performer	Mutya Orquia	Won	
GMMSF Box Office Entertainment Awards	2014	Most Promising Female Star	Janella Salvador	Won	
GMMSF Box Office Entertainment Awards	2014	Most Promising Loveteam for Television	Janella Salvador and Jerome Ponce	Won	
Golden Dove Awards	2014	Best TV Drama Program	Be Careful with My Heart	Won	
Golden Screen TV Awards	2014	Outstanding Original Drama Series	Be Careful with My Heart	Nominated	
Golden Screen TV Awards	2014	Outstanding Performance by an Actress in a Drama Series	Jodi Sta. Maria	Nominated	
Golden Screen TV Awards	2014	Outstanding Breakthrough Performance by an Actor	Jerome Ponce	Nominated	
Golden Screen TV Awards	2014	Outstanding Breakthrough Performance by an Actress	Janella Salvador	Nominated	
New York Festivals – International Television and Film Awards	2013	Best Telenovela	Be Careful with My Heart	Finalist	
Paragala Central Luzon Media Awards	2014	Best Television Actor	Richard Yap	Won	
Paragala Central Luzon Media Awards	2014	Best Television Actress	Jodi Sta. Maria	Won	
PMPC Star Awards for Television	2013	Best Daytime Drama Series	Be Careful with My Heart	Won	
PMPC Star Awards for Television	2013	Best Drama Actor	Richard Yap	Won	
PMPC Star Awards for Television	2013	Best Drama Actress	Jodi Sta. Maria	Won	
PMPC Star Awards for Television	2013	Best Drama Supporting Actress	Sylvia Sanchez	Nominated	
PMPC Star Awards for Television	2013	Best New Male TV Personality	Jerome Ponce	Nominated	
PMPC Star Awards for Television	2013	Best New Female TV Personality	Janella Salvador	Won	
PMPC Star Awards for Television	2014	Best Daytime Drama Series	Be Careful with My Heart	Won	
USTV Student's Choice Awards	2013	Best Local Daily Soap Opera	Be Careful with My Heart	Won	
USTV Student's Choice Awards	2013	Best Ensemble Performance	Be Careful with My Heart Cast	Won	
Vietnam Green Star Awards	2014	Favorite Foreign Drama Series	Be Careful with My Heart	Won	
Vietnam Green Star Awards	2014	Favorite Foreign Actor	Richard Yap	Won	
Vietnam Green Star Awards	2014	Favorite Foreign Actress	Jodi Sta. Maria	Won	
Yahoo! OMG! Awards	2013	Actress of the Year	Jodi Sta. Maria	Nominated	
Yahoo! OMG! Awards	2013	Breakthrough Actor	Richard Yap	Nominated	
Yahoo! OMG! Awards	2013	Celebrity of the Year	Jodi Sta. Maria and Richard Yap	Nominated	
Yahoo! OMG! Awards	2013	Best Teleserye of the Year	Be Careful with My Heart	Nominated	
Yahoo! OMG! Awards	2013	Love Team of the Year	Jodi Sta. Maria and Richard Yap	Nominated	

== Tours and concerts ==
Be Careful With My Heart World Tour

Date	City	Country	Venue	Ref.
March 28, 2013	Abu Dhabi	United Arab Emirates	Du Forum	
March 29, 2013	Dubai	United Arab Emirates	The Indian High School, Dubai	
May 10, 2013	Los Angeles	United States	Shrine Auditorium	
May 17, 2013	Edmonton	Canada	Edmonton Convention Centre	
May 19, 2013	Toronto	Canada	Coca-Cola Coliseum	
July 28, 2013 (two shows)	—N/a	Singapore	Kallang Theatre	

I Heart You 2: The 'Be Careful With My Heart' Anniversary Thanksgiving

Date	City	Country	Venue	Ref.
July 25, 2014	Quezon City	Philippines	Araneta Coliseum	

== Spin-offs ==
=== Cancelled Film ===
On June 18, 2013, Metropolitan Manila Development Authority (MMDA) announced the 8 entries competing for the 2013 Metro Manila Film Festival (MMFF), which includes the Be Careful With My Heart movie. Jodi Sta. Maria and Richard Yap will reprise their roles for the movie, which will premiere on December 25, 2013. The film is said to be the continuation of where the chapter of the series will end shortly before MMFF, by early December 2013. In several recent interviews and appearances, Yap and Sta. Maria also mentioned that the only time their show will not air on television is during the time that the MMFF movie is being shown in cinemas. The show would however be back on air after the movie to continue the story.

In September 2013, the Be Careful With My Heart movie entry was pulled out from the Metro Manila Film Festival due to schedule conflicts of Yap and Sta. Maria. The head of the MMFF wrote a letter to the producer of the show to bring back the movie and even gave them an extension for the submission of the film. But the production team declined and instead continued the series.

== See also ==
- List of programs broadcast by ABS-CBN
- List of ABS-CBN Studios original drama series
