= Janella Salvador =

Filipino actress (born 1998)

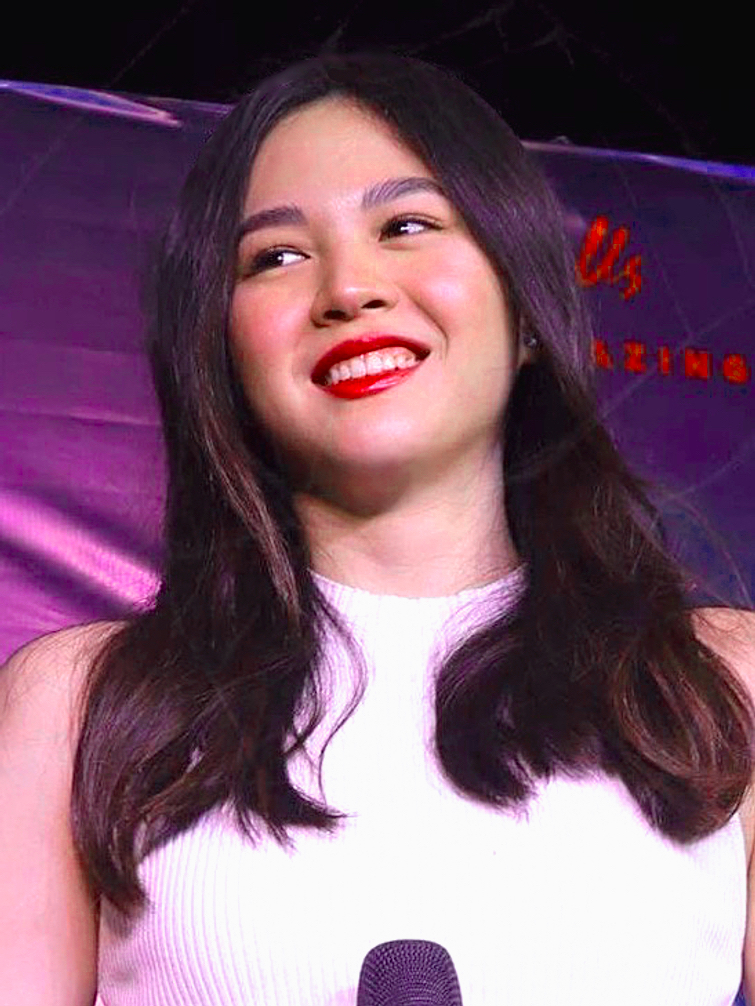
- Salvador in November 2019
- Born: Janella Maxine Desiderio Salvador; March 30, 1998 (age 28); Cebu, Philippines
- Occupations: Actress; singer
- Years active: 2012–present
- Agent: Star Magic (2013–present)
- Children: 1
- Musical career
- Genres: Pop; OPM
- Instruments: Vocals; piano; cello; guitar
- Label: Star Music

Signature
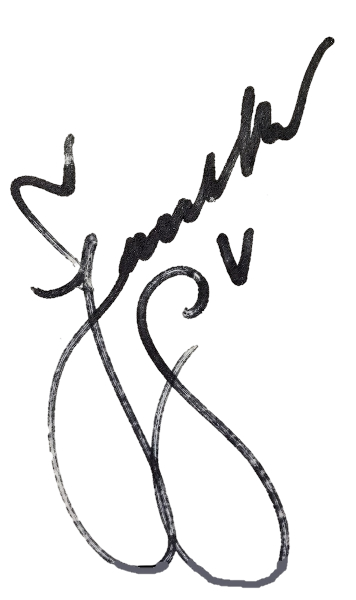

Janella Maxine Desiderio Salvador (Tagalog: [dʒaˈnɛlɐ]; born March 30, 1998) is a Filipino actress and singer. Debuting in the morning drama series Be Careful with My Heart (2012–2014), she followed with lead roles in Oh My G! (2015), Born for You (2016), So Connected (2018), The Killer Bride (2019–2020), Darna (2022–2023) as Mars Ravelo supervillain Valentina, and Under Parallel Skies (2024). Her awards include three PMPC Star Awards, a FAMAS Award and Princess of Philippine Television.

== Early life ==
Janella Maxine Desiderio Salvador was born on March 30, 1998 in Cebu and raised in San Juan in Metro Manila.

Her parents are West End musical actress Jenine Desiderio and Juan Miguel "JM" Salvador, Awit Award recipient songwriter and former lead singer of Rage Band.

She has a half-brother and two step siblings.

== Career ==
=== 2008–2014: Early years, debut ===
Salvador has expressed interest in performing arts at a young age.

Between 2008 and 2009, she represented the Philippines in a world trade fair in Seoul, Korea. She appeared on stage in venues such as Meralco Theater, her first lead role being the school musical Paul! Paul! After guesting on Eat Bulaga's Sa Pula Sa Puti (then-airing on GMA Network), management directors Manny Valera and Star Magic's Johnny Manahan signed her a contract as their talent.

Her official acting debut came in 2012 through the hit daytime drama, Be Careful With My Heart, which aired until 2014. Salvador's character, middle daughter Nikki Grace Lim, was widely known for her Taglish catchphrases. Winning newcomer awards, she would become one of the youngest faces of Garnier skin care. In 2013, she was officially launched as part of Star Magic Circle 2013. Salvador signed film contracts with Regal Entertainment and Star Cinema, both in 2014.

=== 2015–present: Lead roles and music ===
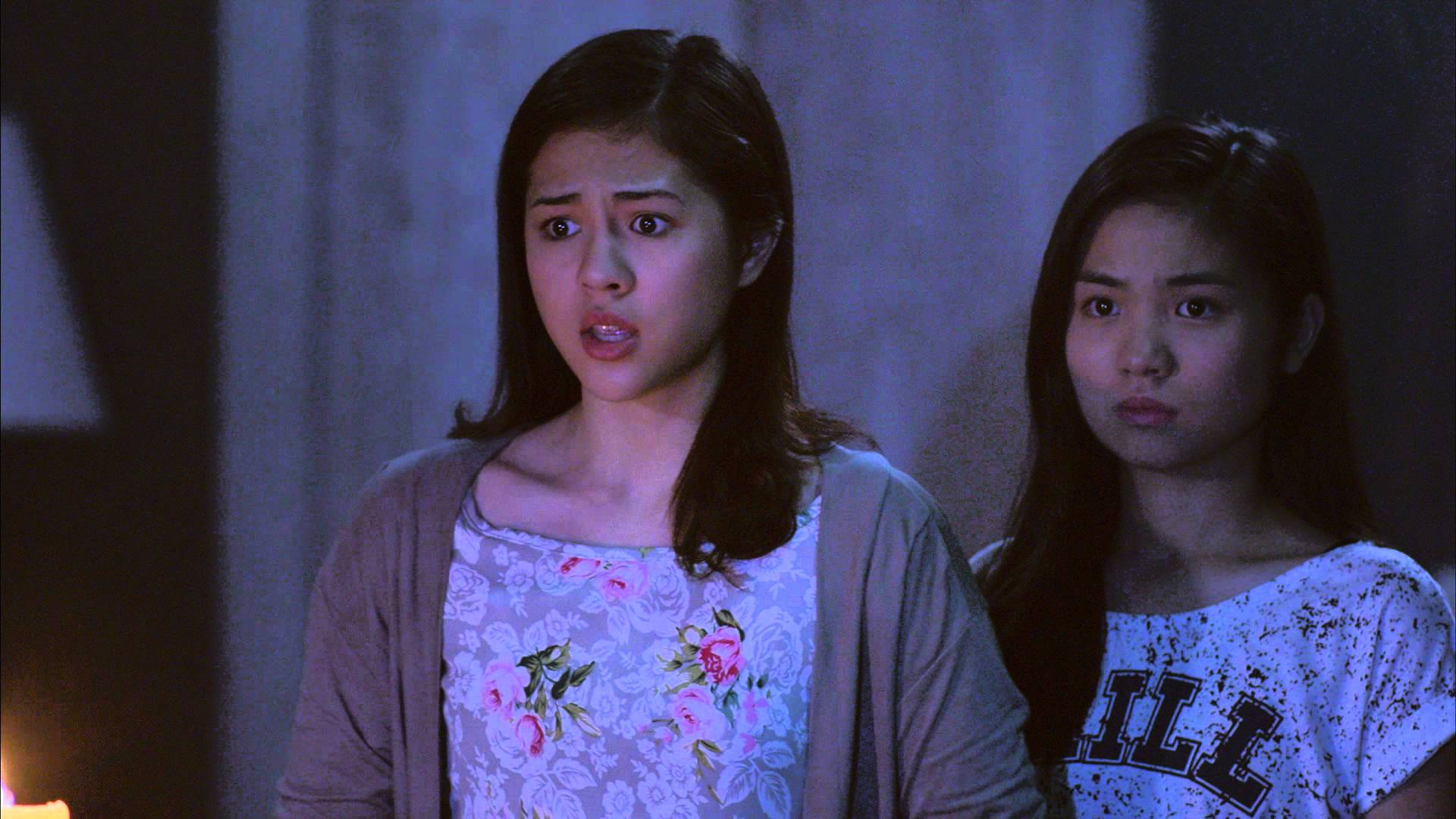
Salvador (left) with co-star Sharlene San Pedro in 2015 for Haunted Mansion

ABS-CBN in 2015 cast Salvador in her first leading role in Oh My G! as an orphan who blames God for the trials in her life. On July 1, Salvador released her debut album, which eventually became certified platinum by PARI. After being selected to interpret the theme song "Happily Ever After" for Hong Kong Disneyland's 10th anniversary, she made her film debut in director Jun Lana's Haunted Mansion. The film was a top grosser at the 41st Metro Manila Film Festival and won Salvador the New Actress of the Year.

In 2016, she had her second major lead TV role through the music-based drama Born for You with Elmo Magalona. Salvador portrays an aspiring musician who studies and works in Tokyo. In the soundtrack, she released her first Japanese language songs. Salvador was announced to work with Disney a third time following her Disney in Concert, Kia Theatre performance with a Philippine exclusive version of Moana's "How Far I'll Go".

"Wow Na Feelings"

2017 came her first solo concert Super Janella. The same year, Salvador would appear in Topel Lee's ensemble film Bloody Crayons. It was announced Salvador would be cast in crime drama The Good Son (formerly Kung Kailangan Mo Ako) but following major script changes, announced she would step down from the role. She then accepted to join Himig Handog a third time through the Karlo Zabala penned song "Wow Na Feelings" which won 4th Best Song and TFC's Global Choice Award. By 2018, she headlined two films. Following a portrayal as a singing mermaid in fantasy film My Fairy Tail Love Story, she would garner praise as a love-struck waitress in director Jason Paul Laxamana's rom-com So Connected.

In 2019, Salvador returned to the small screen after three years through gothic thriller The Killer Bride. Her role as Emma, a mortuary cosmetologist who becomes possessed by the town's spirit won her Princess of Philippine Television at the national Box Office Entertainment Awards. By year end, Salvador starred opposite veteran actress Maricel Soriano in film The Heiress, which was based on the Philippine barang folklore. In 2020 she appeared in Tren, the second highest rating episode of Maalaala Mo Kaya for the year. She played Aira, a university student who reconciles with her past lover.

On November 19, 2021, she was confirmed as supervillain Valentina / Regina Vanguardia in Mars Ravelo's Darna, to be directed by Chito S. Roño. After months of stunt training, the series premiered in August 2022 and concluded February 2023. Her supporting role in Derick Cabrido's 2023 film Mallari gained her a Metro Manila Film Festival Award for Best Supporting Actress nomination.

In July 2023, she also concluded principal photography in Hong Kong for the international romance film Under Parallel Skies. She stars opposite Thai actor Win Metawin, with direction by Kita Kita director Sigrid Andrea Bernardo. It had its world premiere at the 17th Asian Film Awards, its nationwide theatrical release in the Philippines on April 17, Singapore on May, 1 and Thailand on May 9, 2024, as well as limited screening in Laos, Cambodia, UAE and Vietnam. Salvador had her third exclusive contract with ABS-CBN on February 23, 2024, marking 12 years with the network. For Pride Month 2024, Salvador released a music video for her song Hey You that features a sapphic romantic storyline. Extended screenings for Under Parallel Skies lasted until October 2024 in Japan. In 2025, she appeared in her first two indie films, Fleeting, and queer film Open Endings for Cinemalaya 2025; the latter performance winning her a shared Cinemalaya Award for Best Group Ensemble.

From October 2025 to April 2026, she top-billed the mystery series What Lies Beneath with an all-star cast, showing on both Netflix Philippines and Kapamilya. The series reached number 1 in the country on Netflix upon debut, and stayed in the top 10 for several months. Since mid 2026, she stars alongside Jodi Sta. Maria, Francine Diaz, Arci Muñoz, Ji Chang-wook, and Michelin star-recognized Filipino chef JP Anglo in the Philippine-Korean international variety show Kumusta. Airing simultaneously live on TV5 and online through Viu (Asia, Middle East, Africa) and Viki (America, Europe, etc), the program aims to introduce Filipino cuisine abroad as the cast open a restaurant in Gangnam.

=== Upcoming projects ===
She is confirmed as a main actor for the Philippine adaptation for The Good Doctor.

== Personal life ==
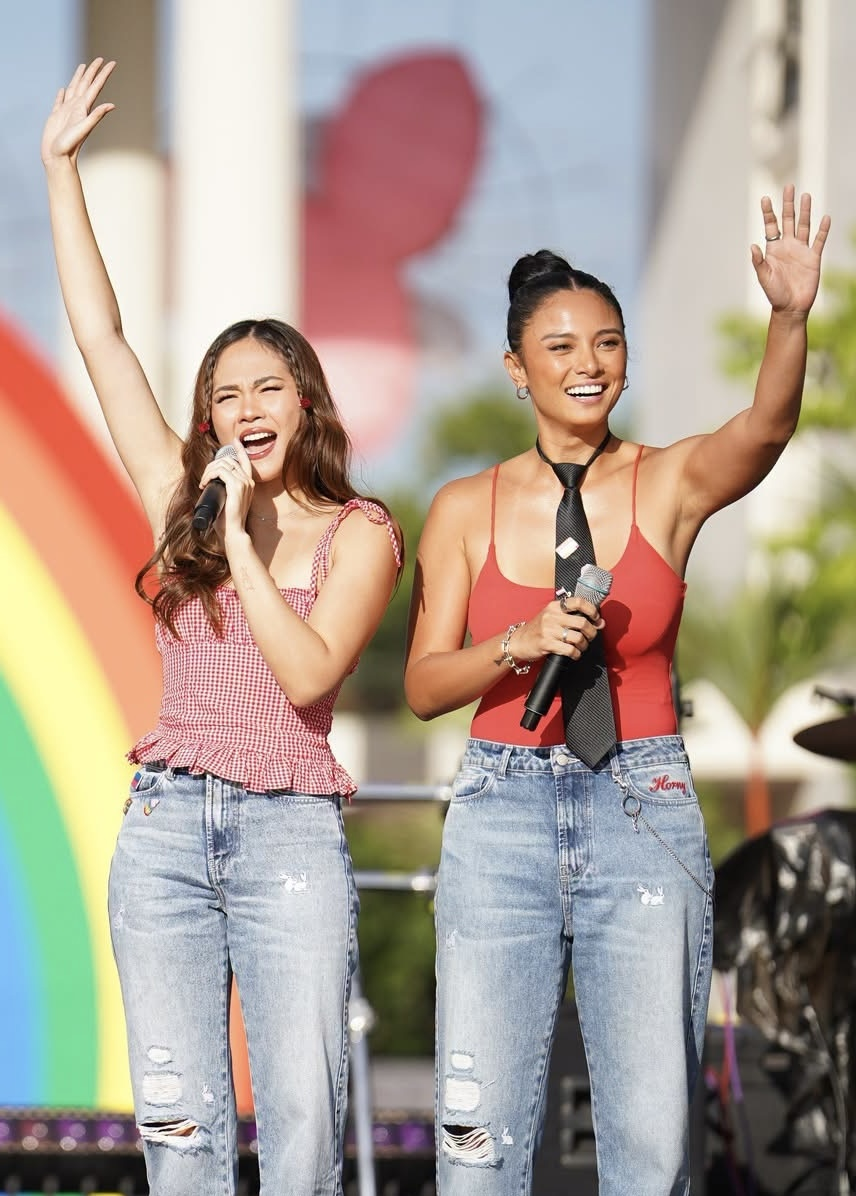
Salvador (left) and Klea Pineda at a pride parade at the University of the Philippines Diliman, Quezon City, in June 2026

She was previously in a relationship with Filipino-British actor Markus Paterson.

On October 20, 2020, she gave birth to their son Jude in Bath, Somerset, England.

As of 2026, Salvador is in a romantic relationship with fellow actress Klea Pineda.

== Discography ==
=== Album ===
Title	Album details	Certifications
Janella Salvador	Full release: December 4, 2015; Label: Star Music; Formats: Digital download, streaming; Track listing: 1. "Harana Na Na Na"; 2. "Tick Tock Love"; 3. "Ganyan Talaga"; 4. "Dear Heart"; 5. "Teka Muna Pag-ibig"; 6. "Kapag Tumibok ang Puso"; 7. "I Can"; 8. "Mahal Kita Pero"; 9. "Kapag Tumibok ang Puso" (with Marlo Mortel); *Includes minus one versions of each track.	PARI: Platinum

=== Singles ===
Title	Year	Album
"Mahal Kita Pero"	2014	Himig Handog P-Pop Love Songs 2014
"Ganyan Talaga"	2015	Janella Salvador
"Kapag Tumibok Ang Puso"	2015	Janella Salvador
"Harana Na Na Na"	2015	Janella Salvador
"Mananatili" (with Marlo Mortel)	2016	Himig Handog P-Pop Love Songs 2016
"Alam Mo Ba" (with Elmo Magalona)	2016	Elmo
"Wow Na Feelings"	2017	Himig Handog P-Pop Love Songs 2017
"Hey It's Me"	2017	Hey It's Me, Jamie
"Atin Cu Pung Sing Sing"	2018	Awit at Laro
"Take It Easy"	2019	Non-album singles
"Nung Tayo Pa"	2019	Himig Handog P-Pop Love Songs 2019
"Blanko"	2020	Non-album singles
"headtone"	2024	Non-album singles
"Hey You"	2024	Non-album singles

=== Original soundtrack ===
Title	Year	Album
"Pumapag-Ibig"	2016	The Achy Breaky Hearts OST
"Born for You" (with Elmo Magalona)	2016	Born for You OST
"How Far I'll Go - (Philippines version)"	2016	Moana OST
"Be My Fairytale"	2018	My Fairy Tail Love Story OST

== Filmography ==
Key
†	Denotes productions that have not yet been released

=== Film ===
Year	Title	Role	Ref.
2015	Haunted Mansion	Ella Santos	
2016	Mano Po 7: Chinoy	Caroline Wong	
2017	Bloody Crayons	Eunice Nicolas	
2018	My Fairy Tail Love Story	Chantel Quejada	
2018	So Connected	Trisha Biscocho	
2019	The Heiress	Guia	
2023	Mallari	Agnes Salvador	
2024	Under Parallel Skies	Iris/Thea	
2025	Fleeting	Gem	
2025	Open Endings	Charlie	

=== Television ===
Year	Title	Role	Ref.
2012–2014	Be Careful with My Heart	Nikki Grace Lim	
2014	Goin' Bulilit	Herself	
2014	Maalaala Mo Kaya: Card	Felynit Gallego	
2014	Maalaala Mo Kaya: Selfie	Michelle Ann Rose Bonzo	
2014	Home Sweetie Home	Teen Darla Sanchez	
2014–present	ASAP	Host / Performer	
2015	Oh My G!	Sophie Z. Cepeda	
2015	Wansapanataym: Fat Patty	Patricia Dionisio	
2015	Maalaala Mo Kaya: Pink Dress	Amabelle Marquez	
2015	Wansapanataym: Christmas Witch	Irene	
2016	FPJ's Ang Probinsyano	Denise Paulino	
2016	Born for You	Samantha "Sam" Reyes / Sam Kazuko	
2016	Wansapanataym: Holly & Mau	Holly Arellano	
2017–2018	Wansapanataym: Jasmin's Flower Powers	Rose "Jasmin" Miraflores	
2018	Maalaala Mo Kaya: Mangga	Daisy	
2018	Maalaala Mo Kaya: Cards	Rosela	
2019	Maalaala Mo Kaya: White Ribbon	Moira Dela Torre	
2019	Touch Screen	Amanda Muñoz	
2019–2020	The Killer Bride	Emma Bonaobra / Vida Dela Cuesta	
2020	Maalaala Mo Kaya: Tren	Aira Dimapilis	
2020	U-turn	Drew	
2021	Click, Like, Share: Barter	Janice	
2022–2023	Mars Ravelo's Darna	Valentina / Regina Vanguardia	
2025	What Lies Beneath	Alicia Marie "Alice" Quintana-Miller	
2026	Kumusta	Herself	
2026	The Good Doctor †	Lead role	

=== Music video ===
Year	Title	Artist	Ref.
2015	"Chinito Problems"	Enchong Dee	
2017	"Unli"	BoybandPH	
2024	"Huling Ngiti"	Marlo Mortel	

=== Stage musical ===
Year	Title	Location	Ref.
2008	Jollitown Christmas	N/A	
2009	Paul! Paul!	Meralco Theater	

== Awards and nominations ==
Award ceremony	Year	Category	Nominee / Work	Result	Ref.
Alta Media Icon Awards	2015	Best Female Recording Artist	Janella Salvador	Won	
ASAP Pop Viewers' Choice Awards	2013	Pop Breakthrough Star	Be Careful with My Heart	Won	
ASAP Pop Viewers' Choice Awards	2014	Pop Female Cutie	Be Careful with My Heart	Nominated	
ASAP Pop Viewers' Choice Awards	2014	Pop Teen Popsies	Janella Salvador (with Marlo Mortel) Be Careful with My Heart	Nominated	
Candy Readers' Choice Awards	2013	Female Rising Star	Be Careful with My Heart	Won	
Cinemalaya Independent Film Festival	2025	Best Ensemble Performance (shared with Jasmine Curtis-Smith, Klea Pineda, and Leanne Mamonong)	Open Endings	Won	
Dramaland Awards	2022	Best Supporting Actress	Darna	Won	
FAMAS Award	2013	German Moreno Youth Achievement Award	Janella Salvador	Won	
Gawad PASADO Awards	2015	PinakaPASADOng Dangal ng Kabataan	Janella Salvador	Won	
Guillermo Mendoza Memorial Scholarship Foundation (GMMSF) Box Office Entertainment Awards	2014	Most Promising Female Star	Be Careful with My Heart	Won	
Guillermo Mendoza Memorial Scholarship Foundation (GMMSF) Box Office Entertainment Awards	2014	Most Promising Loveteam for Television	Janella Salvador (with Jerome Ponce) Be Careful with My Heart	Won	
Guillermo Mendoza Memorial Scholarship Foundation (GMMSF) Box Office Entertainment Awards	2020	Princess of Philippine Television	The Killer Bride	Won	
Golden Screen TV Awards	2014	Outstanding Breakthrough Performance by an Actress	Be Careful with My Heart	Nominated	
Guild of Educators, Mentors, and Students Award	2019	Best Actress in a Leading Role	The Killer Bride	Nominated	
Himig Handog P-Pop Love Songs	2014	3rd Best Song	"Mahal Kita Pero"	Won	
Himig Handog P-Pop Love Songs	2014	Best Music Video	"Mahal Kita Pero"	Won	
Himig Handog P-Pop Love Songs	2017	4th Best Song	"Wow Na Feelings"	Won	
Himig Handog P-Pop Love Songs	2017	TFC's Global Choice Award	"Wow Na Feelings"	Won	
Himig Handog P-Pop Love Songs	2019	4th Best Song	"Nung Tayo Pa"	Won	
Jeepney TV Fan Favorite Awards	2022	Lead Actress		Nominated	
Lionheart TV Awards	2022	Favorite Kontrabida	Darna	Won	
Metro Manila Film Festival	2023	Best Supporting Actress	Mallari	Nominated	
MOR Pinoy Music Awards	2015	Best New Artist	Janella Salvador	Nominated	
Myx Music Awards	2015	Best Appearance in a Music Video	"Chinito Problems"	Nominated	
Myx Music Awards	2019	Remake of the Year	"Be My Fairytale"	Nominated	
Myx Music Awards	2019	Media Soundtrack of the Year	"Be My Fairytale"	Nominated	
Myx Music Awards	2019	MYX Celebrity VJ of the Year	Janella Salvador (with Elmo Magalona)	Nominated	
Nickelodeon Kids' Choice Awards	2017	Favorite Pinoy Star	Janella Salvador	Nominated	
PMPC Star Awards for Music	2016	Best New Female Recording Artist of the Year	Janella Salvador	Won	
PMPC Star Awards for Movies	2016	New Movie Actress of the Year	Haunted Mansion	Won	
PMPC Star Awards for Television	2013	Best New Female TV Personality	Be Careful with My Heart	Won	
Push Awards	2022	Favorite Onscreen Performance	Darna	Nominated	
Southeast Asian Achievement Award	2022	Best Supporting Actress	Darna	Won	
TAG Awards Chicago	2022	Best Supporting Actress	Darna	Won	
Top 10 of Asia	2024	Southeast Asian Best Actress (Top 10)	Janella Salvador	Won	
Wish 107.5 Music Awards	2016	Best WISHclusive Performance by a Young Artist	“Mahal Kita Pero”	Nominated	
Wish 107.5 Music Awards	2016	WISH Original Song of the Year	“Mahal Kita Pero”	Won	
Wish 107.5 Music Awards	2016	WISH Young Artist of the Year		Nominated	
Yahoo! Celebrity Awards	2014	Female Emerging Star	Be Careful with My Heart	Nominated	
