= Marlo Mortel =

Filipino actor and singer (born 1993)

- Born: Jhann Marlowe Galman Pamintuan; January 4, 1993 (age 33); Muntinlupa, Metro Manila, Philippines
- Education: San Beda College Alabang
- Occupations: Singer; Songwriter; Musician; Actor; Host; Producer
- Years active: 2009–present
- Agents: Sparkle (2009–2012); Star Magic (2012–2025); Viva Artists Agency (2026–present)
- Musical career
- Genres: Pop; R&B; Reggae
- Instruments: Vocals; guitar; piano
- Labels: Star Music; PolyEast

Jhann Marlowe Galman Pamintuan (born January 4, 1993), known professionally as Marlo Mortel, is a Filipino actor, TV host, musician, entrepreneur, and singer-songwriter. Who is best known for his role as Nicolo Angelo Cortez in the morning television drama, Be Careful with My Heart and Gabriel Luna in OMG. In the novel I Love You Since 1892, he was originally introduced as Juanito Alfonso, a noble and kind-hearted love interest for protagonist Carmela. He is currently under Viva Communications' talent management Viva Artists Agency.

== Early life ==
Mortel is the only child of Merlie Pamintuan and Rommel Pamintuan. He said that he was a sickly child who had a sensitive stomach and asthma. According to him, he nearly died due to his severe asthma when he was five years old.

Mortel has said he is academically advanced, stating that he learned to read, write, and tell time at the age of three. He earned a Bachelor of Science in Business Administration in Marketing Management at San Beda College in Alabang, Muntinlupa.

== Career ==
=== Beginnings (2009–2014) ===
Mortel entered show business in 2009 as a contestant for the 5th season of GMA Network's talent show StarStruck. At the time, he used the screen name Marlowe Pamintuan. He became one of the regular teen performers at German Moreno's Walang Tulugan with the Master Showman, using the name John Miguel Pamintuan. In 2010, he was cast in the teen-oriented drama Reel Love Presents: Tween Hearts. There, he played the role of Uno, the best friend of Barbie Forteza's character (Bambi), who becomes romantically involved with Leslie (Lexi Fernandez). He later recorded "Wake Me Up" by Wham!, one of the songs in the soundtrack album of Tween Hearts' movie adaptation, Tween Academy: Class of 2012, released in 2011.

Mortel got his career breakthrough after he auditioned for The X Factor Philippines in 2012. Shortly after, he was cast as Nicolo Angelo Cortez in the daytime series Be Careful with My Heart. Since then, a "loveteam" has been formed between Mortel and co-star Janella Salvador. On February 22, 2014, Mortel and Janella starred in Maalaala Mo Kaya's episode "Card".

On March 24, 28, and September 26, he competed in The Singing Bee. He was the champion of the week in March 24 with 40,000 and champion of the day with 60,000, then he became the defending champion on September 26 with 400,000. But, due to prior commitments with as the filming of Be Careful with My Heart, and for the upcoming show called Oh My G!, Mortel, withdrew from the show on October 3, 2014, he also mentioned on Instagram. Because of what happened, Inah de Belen took the place. He was the defending champion for two weeks and six days.

=== Rising stardom (2015–present) ===
After his success in Be Careful with My Heart, Marlo was cast as "Gabriel Luna", the male lead of Janella Salvador's character in Oh My G!.

In a live interview on Aquino & Abunda Tonight in January 2015, Mortel revealed that he was not supposed to have as much lines in the defunct daytime series Be Careful with My Heart, but was given a bigger role due to the feedback to his tandem with Janella Salvador. He also said that he only intended to enter showbiz as a singer, and not as an actor, noting he does not consider himself good-looking compared to his contemporaries.

In March 2015, ASAP launched Marlo's newest boy group called Harana together with his co-members, Joseph Marco, Bryan Santos and Michael Pangilinan with their carrier single, "Number One".

In January 2016, Mortel and co-star Janella Salvador were chosen as interpreters of "Mananatili," one of the top 15 finalists in the 2016 Himig Handog P-Pop Love Songs, composed by Francis Louis Salazar.

In 2019, he became one of the contestants in TNT All Star Grand Resbak in Tawag ng Tanghalan sa "It's Showtime" but was eliminated.

In 2020, he released his fourth composition written during enhanced community quarantine "Racing Waters" which he wrote to raise awareness of psychological and mental abuse. Later on the same year, he also released his written new single with Evelyn Cormier of American Idol Top 14 entitled "Bones". The music video was recorded separately in Manila, Philippines and New Hampshire, United States. He also joined the cast for Metro Manila Film Festival 2020 film entry "Suarez: The Healing Priest" where he played the role of news reporter.

In April 2021, Marlo released his debut single “Mahina” under Polyeast Records as well as "Bituin" On his virtual press conference, He said that he wrote the single for his friend who is currently living in Vietnam.

== Personal life ==
Aside from being a TV host, actor, and musician, he also has a business called "Ornstal," meaning Oriental Stones and Crystals, which sells bracelets and necklaces made of semi-precious stones and crystals.

In August 2018, his mother, Merlie Pamintuan, died due to complications of stage 4 breast cancer which was originally diagnosed as stage 2 in 2014.

In July 2020, he revealed on his Instagram account that he had had a mental breakdown. In an interview with Philippine Entertainment Portal in 2021, he announced that he is planning to return to school to major in psychology.

== Discography ==
=== Music video appearances ===
2014

- Mahal Kita Pero Janella Salvador

2015

- Shine Pilipinas! Liza Soberano ft. Enrique Gil
- I Can Janella Salvador

2016

- Mananatili" Music Video with Janella Salvador

=== Compilation albums ===
Year	Track	Album	Artist	Details	Certification	Ref.
2011	"Wake Me Up Before You Go-Go"	Tween Academy Album	Himself	Composed by: George Michael; Licensed by: Warner Chapell Music	—N/a	
2015	"M.O.O" (My One and Only)	OPM Fresh	Himself	Date Released: February 2, 2015; Words & Music by: Marlo Mortel; Arranged by: Janno Queyquep; Music Label: Star Music	TBA	
2016	"Mananatili"	Himig Handog P-Pop Love Songs 2016	Himself with Janella Salvador	Date Released: March 2016; Words & Music by: Francis Louis Salazar; Arranged by: Kiko Salazar and Thyro Alfaro; Music Label: Star Music	—N/a	

== Filmography ==
=== Films ===
Year	Title	Role	Ref.
2011	Tween Academy: Class of 2012	Prom bully	
2015	Haunted Mansion	Adrian	
2016	Isang Araw: Ikatlong Yugto	Emmanuel	
2016	Mano Po 7: Tsinoy	Henry	
2017	Fallback	Frankie	
2018	Petmalu	Peter John Ledesma	
2018	One Great Love	Bryan	
2019	Santigwar	Aldrin	
2019	Damaso	Fernando Damaso	
2020	Suarez: The Healing Priest	Robert	
2021	Ayuda Babes	Jun	
2025	Lola Barang		

=== Television ===
Year	Title	Role	Source
2009	StarStruck: V The Worldwide Invasion		
2009–2012	Walang Tulugan with the Master Showman	Teen stars (Performer/Co-host)	
2010–2012	Reel Love Presents Tween Hearts	Uno Morales	
2012	The X Factor Philippines		
2012–2014	Be Careful with My Heart	Nicolo Angelo "Mallows/Nic-Nic" Cortez	
2014	Maalaala Mo Kaya: Card	Celo Magallanes	
2014	Maalaala Mo Kaya: Bonnet	Paolo Buenafe	
2014	The Singing Bee	Game show, Champion of the week and Champion of the day of March, 2-week and a-6-day defending champion of September–October	
2014	Home Sweetie Home	Young Romeo Valentino	
2015	Oh My G!	Gabriel "Gabby" Luna	
2015	Wansapanataym: Fat Patty	Richard	
2015–2016	Kris TV	Himself	
2015–2025; 2026–present	ASAP	Co-host & performer, Harana	
2015–2020	Umagang Kay Ganda	Segment Host	
2016	We Love OPM	Member of "Power Chords" with Marion Aunor and Kaye Cal	
2017	Maalaala Mo Kaya: Pride and Joy	Young Raul	
2017	Maalaala Mo Kaya: Diploma	Young Memerto	
2017	Maalaala Mo Kaya: Gitara	Joel	
2017–2018	Hanggang Saan	Unyo	
2018	FPJ's Ang Probinsyano	Noel Marasigan	
2019	Ipaglaban Mo: Reputasyon	Vincent	
2021	Mars	Guest	
2022	Maalaala Mo Kaya: Altar	Angelo Villadarez	
2023	FPJ's Batang Quiapo	Young Armando "Mando" Mendoza	
2023	Nag-aapoy na Damdamin	Young Javier Buencamino	
2025	Rainbow Rumble	Contestant	
2025–2026	Totoy Bato	Coby Sandoval	
2025–2026	What Lies Beneath	Angelo Melendez	

== Accolades ==
Year	Award-giving Body	Category	Nominated work	Result	Ref.
2016	32nd PMPC Star Awards for Movies	New Movie Actor of the Year	Haunted Mansion	Won	
2016	Kabantugan Awards	Best Male TV Personality	Himself	Won	
2019	41st Catholic Mass Media Awards	Best Music Video	"I Pray"	Won	
2019	41st Catholic Mass Media Awards	Best Inspirational Song Recognition	"I Pray"	Won	
2020	11th PMPC Star Awards for Music	Male Pop Artist of the Year	Himself	Won	
2021	36th PMPC Star Awards for Movies	Indie Movie Theme Song of the Year	"Mayroon Bang Pagbabago" (Damaso)	Nominated	
