= Broken Vows =

Broken Vow(s) may refer to:

- Broken Vow
- Broken Vow (TV series)
- Broken Vows (painting), an 1856 painting by Philip Hermogenes Calderon
- Broken Vows (1987 film), American television film
- Broken Vows (2016 film), American film
- "Broken Vows", a shortened name for the song "I'm Thinking Tonight of My Blue Eyes"
- Spill Zone: The Broken Vow, a 2019 graphic novel by Scott Westerfeld
- "The Broken Vow", an episode of We Will Survive
- "The Broken Vow", a poem by Amanda M. Edmond
- "The Broken Vow", a track on Jane Doe (album)
- "The Broken Vow", a track on Thousands of Miles Between Us

== See also ==
- The Broken Marriage Vow
