= GMO Entertainment Unit =

Former production unit of ABS-CBN

- Type: Television production of ABS-CBN
- Industry: Television production
- Founded: January 30, 2012; 14 years ago August 19, 2024; 2 years ago (relaunched)
- Defunct: March 22, 2019; 7 years ago
- Headquarters: Quezon City, Philippines
- Key people: Ginny Monteagudo-Ocampo
- Products: Television programs
- Owner: ABS-CBN
- Parent: Star Creatives Television

GMO Entertainment Unit (Ginny Monteagudo-Ocampo's business unit) was one of the 4 drama units of ABS-CBN. A subsidiary of Star Creatives, This unit is best known for its long-running daytime teleserye Be Careful with My Heart.

In early 2019, the unit was dissolved, with Monteagudo-Ocampo shifting her focus to iWant, where she is the content head.

This unit was replaced by RCD Narratives.

== List of dramas produced by GMO Entertainment Unit ==
All these dramas were aired on ABS-CBN.

Shows	First Episode Date	Final Episode Date	No. Of Episodes	Ref.
Mundo Man ay Magunaw	January 30, 2012	July 13, 2012	113	
Reputasyon	July 11, 2011	January 20, 2012	140	
Be Careful with My Heart	July 9, 2012	November 28, 2014	618	
Kahit Puso'y Masugatan	July 9, 2012	February 1, 2013	150	
Dugong Buhay	April 8, 2013	September 27, 2013	123	
Galema: Anak ni Zuma	September 30, 2013	March 28, 2014	130	
Pure Love	July 7, 2014	November 14, 2014	93	
Dream Dad	November 24, 2014	April 17, 2015	103	
Oh My G!	January 19, 2015	July 24, 2015	132	
FlordeLiza	January 19, 2015	August 28, 2015	158	
Nasaan Ka Nang Kailangan Kita	January 19, 2015	October 16, 2015	192	
Ningning	July 27, 2015	January 15, 2016	125	
We Will Survive	February 29, 2016	July 15, 2016	97	
The Greatest Love	September 5, 2016	April 21, 2017	163	
The Better Half	February 13, 2017	September 8, 2017	147	
Hanggang Saan	November 27, 2017	April 27, 2018	108	
Playhouse	September 17, 2018	March 22, 2019	135	
