= Playhouse (Philippine TV series) =

2018–19 Philippine television romantic comedy drama series

- Title card
- Genre: Family; Romantic comedy
- Created by: Mel Mendoza-Del Rosario
- Developed by: ABS-CBN Studios
- Written by: Jimuel Dela Cruz; Kay Conlu-Brondial; Alpha Fortun; Jaymar Castro; Cyrus Dan Cañares; Jaja Amarillo
- Directed by: Jeffrey R. Jeturian; Paco Sta. Maria
- Starring: Zanjoe Marudo; Angelica Panganiban
- Country of origin: Philippines
- Original language: Filipino
- No. of episodes: 135

Production
- Executive producers: Carlo Katigbak; Cory Vidanes; Laurenti Dyogi; Ginny Monteagudo-Ocampo
- Producers: Aimee Fabian Sumalde; Mark Anthony D. Gile
- Production locations: Metro Manila; Japan
- Editors: Joy Buenaventura; Mai Marcial; Mayette Tugano; Marlow Malvar; Arjay Felizarta
- Running time: 28–32 minutes
- Production company: GMO Unit

Original release
- Network: ABS-CBN
- Release: September 17, 2018 – March 22, 2019

Related
- ZEKElingMagingSHIELA: The Zeke and Shiela's Almost Love Story

Playhouse (sometimes stylized as PlayHouse, PlayHOUSE or playHouSE) is a Philippine television drama romantic comedy series broadcast by ABS-CBN. Directed by Jeffrey R. Jeturian and Paco Sta. Maria, it stars Zanjoe Marudo and Angelica Panganiban. It aired on the network's PrimeTanghali line-up from and worldwide on TFC from September 17, 2018 to March 22, 2019, replacing Sana Dalawa ang Puso and was replaced by Nang Ngumiti ang Langit.

== Premise ==
Young married couple Patty and Marlon are on the brink of calling it quits when an unexpected need to parent a godchild forces them to be together again. In their parenthood journey, they will find themselves giving love a second chance and transforming their house into a home.

== Cast and characters ==
=== Main cast ===
- Zanjoe Marudo as Marlon Ilaban
- Angelica Panganiban as Patricia "Patty" Calumpang-Ilaban
- Justin James Quilantang as Robin John Cortes

=== Supporting cast ===
- Carlo Aquino as Dr. Harold Miguel
- Isabelle Daza as Leah Samonte
- Alex Medina as Manuelito "Manny" Bradford Hawkins
- Smokey Manaloto as Noli Calumpang
- Nadia Montenegro as Belen Calumpang
- Dexter Doria as Rebecca "Lola Becca" Ilaban
- Malou de Guzman as Yaya Lena Santos
- Kean Cipriano as Renato "Ato" Payuan
- Maxene Magalona as Natalia Cortes-Smith
- Jomari Angeles as Lorenzo "Renz" Calumpang
- Ingrid dela Paz as Sandra Calumpang
- Kisses Delavin as Shiela Ubaldo
- Donny Pangilinan as Ezekiel "Zeke" Domingo
- Ariella Arida as Irene Flores
- AC Bonifacio as Cindy Baluyot
- Ian Galliguez as Mitchie de Vera
- Kazel Kinouchi as Olivia "Liv" Asuncion
- Antonette Garcia as Chedeng
- Nor Domingo as Atty. Ramon Sacay
- Nick Lizaso as Marcial Reyes
- Lovely Rivero as Cielo Reyes-Domingo
- Ivan Padilla as Peter Smith
- Ana De Leon as Nicole

=== Guest cast ===
- Denise Laurel as Emily Grace L. Cortes
- Patrick Garcia as Brad V. Cortes
- Yñigo Delen as young Marlon
- Louise Abuel as Teen Marlon
- Ces Quesada as Josie Salazar
- Yayo Aguila as Catherine "Cathy" Calumpang
- Michael Flores as Roger Cuevas
- Richard Quan as Eli Domingo
- Anna Marin as Rowena Yamamoto
- Jong Cuenco as Dr. Greg Miguel
- Arlene Muhlach as Barbara "Barang" Cuevas
- Vanessa Alariao as Nurse Marge

== Broadcast ==
Playhouse premiered on September 17, 2018.

This is the final drama series produced by GMO Unit, prior to the latter's dissolution.

=== Reruns ===
The show began airing re-runs on Jeepney TV from March 30 to June 26, 2020 (replacing the re-runs of The Blood Sisters); April 5 to July 2, 2021 (replacing the re-runs of Since I Found You); February 20 to May 26, 2023 (replacing the re-runs of The Better Half); and January 31 to May 24, 2026 (replacing the re-runs of Ysabella).

== Reception ==
Kantar Media National TV Ratings (11:30AM PST)
Pilot Episode	Finale Episode	Peak	Average
13.6% September 17, 2018	17.0% March 22, 2019	20.5% December 17, 2018	TBA

== Spin-off ==
A spin-off miniseries called ZEKElingMagingSHIELA: The Zeke and Shiela's Almost Love Story was released iWant on February 15, 2019 as an iWant original series. It only consists of 3 episodes.

== See also ==
- List of programs broadcast by ABS-CBN
- List of ABS-CBN Studios original drama series
- List of programs broadcast by Jeepney TV
