= List of We Will Survive episodes =

We Will Survive is a 2016 Philippine comedy-drama television series directed by Jeffrey Jeturian and Mervyn Brondial, starring Pokwang and Melai Cantiveros. The series premiered on ABS-CBN and worldwide on The Filipino Channel on February 29, 2016, replacing Pasión de Amor. Starting April 18, 2016, it was demoted to ABS-CBN's Kapamilya Gold afternoon block to give way for My Super D. It airs on Weekdays at 5:00-5:45pm after Tubig at Langis.

== Series overview ==
Season	Episodes	Originally released	
Season	Episodes	First released	Last released
1	77	February 29, 2016	June 17, 2016
2	20	June 20, 2016	July 15, 2016

== Episode list ==
=== Chapter 1 ===
Episode No.	Title	Hashtag	Date Aired
1	From The Start	#WWSFromTheStart	February 29, 2016
2	The Trials	#WWSTheTrials	March 1, 2016
3	Albay Bye	#WWSAlbayBye	March 2, 2016
4	In The City	#WWSInTheCity	March 3, 2016
5	The Freshstart	#WWSTheFreshstart	March 4, 2016
6	Together Again	#WWSTogetherAgain	March 7, 2016
7	The Test	#WWSTheTest	March 8, 2016
8	The Promotion	#WWSThePromotion	March 9, 2016
9	The Closure	#WWSTheClosure	March 10, 2016
10	Count On Me	#WWSCountOnMe	March 11, 2016
11	Salon Wars	#WWSSalonWars	March 14, 2016
12	Second Chances	#WWSSecondChances	March 15, 2016
13	Fighting Spirit	#WWSFightingSpirit	March 16, 2016
14	Preggy Probs	#WWSPreggyProbs	March 17, 2016
15	Source of Joy	#WWSSourceofJoy	March 18, 2016
16	A Pleasant Surprise	#WWSAPleasantSurprise	March 21, 2016
17	The Kickstart	#WWSTheKickstart	March 22, 2016
18	Role Playing	#WWSRolePlaying	March 23, 2016
19	Ready Set Love	#WWSReadySetLove	March 28, 2016
20	Hit And Miss	#WWSHitAndMiss	March 29, 2016
21	Picture Perfect	#WWSPicturePerfect	March 30, 2016
22	Girl Or Boy	#WWSGirlOrBoy	March 31, 2016
23	Celebrate Life	#WWSCelebrateLife	April 1, 2016
24	It's A Date	#WWSItsADate	April 4, 2016
25	Special Delivery	#WWSSpecialDelivery	April 5, 2016
26	Welcome Baby Jude	#WWSWelcomeBabyJude	April 6, 2016
27	Touch of Love	#WWSTouchofLove	April 7, 2016
28	The Comeback	#WWSTheComeback	April 8, 2016
29	One Happy Family	#WWSOneHappyFamily	April 11, 2016
30	The Chase	#WWSTheChase	April 12, 2016
31	The Crossover	#WWSTheCrossover	April 13, 2016
32	The Leaving Curve	#WWSTheLeavingCurve	April 14, 2016
33	Tough Choices	#WWSToughChoices	April 15, 2016
34	The Big Leap	#WWSTheBigLeap	April 18, 2016
35	Cause Of Fear	#WWSCause Of Fear	April 19, 2016
36	The Unexpected	#WWSTheUnexpected	April 20, 2016
37	Back Again	#WWSBackAgain	April 21, 2016
38	Stolen Moments	#WWSStolenMoments	April 22, 2016
39	Quick Escape	#WWSQuickEscape	April 25, 2016
40	Identity Revealed	#WWSIdentityRevealed	April 26, 2016
41	Taking Chances	#WWSTakingChances	April 27, 2016
42	Answered Prayers	#WWSAnsweredPrayers	April 28, 2016
43	The Turnover	#WWSTheTurnover	April 29, 2016
44	Safe And Sound	#WWSSafeAndSound	May 2, 2016
45	The Reunion	#WWSTheReunion	May 3, 2016
46	The Consequence	#WWSTheConsequence	May 4, 2016
47	Adjustments	#WWSAdjustments	May 5, 2016
48	Moving Forward	#WWSMovingForward	May 6, 2016
49	The Broken Vow	#WWSTheBrokenVow	May 10, 2016
50	Flame Up	#WWSFlameUp	May 11, 2016
51	Filing The Gap	#WWSFilingTheGap	May 12, 2016
52	The Disconnection	#WWSTheDisconnection	May 13, 2016
53	The Legal Battle	#WWSTheLegalBattle	May 16, 2016
54	Way Back Home	#WWSWayBackHome	May 17, 2016
55	Shared Moments	#WWSSharedMoments	May 18, 2016
56	Ignite The Love	#WWSIgniteTheLove	May 19, 2016
57	Present Role	#WWSPresentRole	May 20, 2016
58	True Feelings	#WWSTrueFeelings	May 23, 2016
59	Closer Together	#WWSCloserTogether	May 24, 2016
60	Superheroes	#WWSSuperheroes	May 25, 2016
61	The Family Affair	#WWSTheFamilyAffair	May 26, 2016
62	Joyful Moments	#WWSJoyfulMoments	May 27, 2016
63	One True Love	#WWSOneTrueLove	May 30, 2016
64	As One Family	#WWSAsOneFamily	May 31, 2016
65	Seek And Find	#WWSSeekAndFind	June 1, 2016
66	Ceasefire	#WWSCeasefire	June 2, 2016
67	Grow In Love	#WWSGrowInLove	June 3, 2016
68	Exclusively Dating	#WWSExclusivelyDating	June 6, 2016
69	Labor of Love	#WWSLaborofLove	June 7, 2016
70	I Love You	#WWSILoveYou	June 8, 2016
71	Mixed Emotions	#WWSMixedEmotions	June 9, 2016
72	One Last Wish	#WWSOneLastWish	June 10, 2016
73	Extended Family	#WWSExtendedFamily	June 13, 2016
74	Second Proposal	#WWSSecondProposal	June 14, 2016
75	Promise Of Forever	#WWSPromiseOfForever	June 15, 2016
76	On Bended Knees	#WWSOnBendedKnees	June 16, 2016
77	Dream Come True	#WWSDreamComeTrue	June 17, 2016

=== Chapter 2 ===
Episode No.	Title	Hashtag	Date Aired
78	Beyond Distance	#WWSBeyondDistance	June 20, 2016
79	Road To Forever	#WWSRoadToForever	June 21, 2016
80	Bundle Of Joy	#WWSBundleOfJoy	June 22, 2016
81	The Wedding Day	#WWSTheWeddingDay	June 23, 2016
82	The Promise of Love	#WWSThePromiseOfLove	June 24, 2016
83	The Ever After	#WWSTheEverAfter	June 27, 2016
84	One Big Fight	#WWSOneBigFight	June 28, 2016
85	Spark Of Hope	#WWSSparkOfHope	June 29, 2016
86	Keep The Faith	#WWSKeepTheFaith	June 30, 2016
87	Strength In Love	#WWSStrengthInLove	July 1, 2016
88	Stand By You	#WWSStandByYou	July 4, 2016
89	Time For Us	#WWSTimeForUs	July 5, 2016
90	Destinys Game	#WWSDestinysGame	July 6, 2016
91	The Vow	#WWSTheVow	July 7, 2016
92	The Sacrifice	#WWSTheSacrifice	July 8, 2016
93	The Biggest Challenge	#WWSTheBiggestChallenge	July 11, 2016
94	The Biggest Fear	#WWSTheBiggestFear	July 12, 2016
95	The Gift Of Life	#WWSTheGiftOfLife	July 13, 2016
96	The Miracle	#WWSTheMiracle	July 14, 2016
97	The Ultimate Friendship Goal	#WWSTheUltimateFriendshipGoal	July 15, 2016
