= Nasaan Ka Nang Kailangan Kita =

2015 Philippine television revenge drama series

- Title card
- Also known as: Ricky Lee's Nasaan Ka Nang Kailangan Kita; Waiting for Love
- Genre: Romance; Family drama; Melodrama; Revenge
- Created by: ABS-CBN Studios; Mel Mendoza-del Rosario
- Based on: Nasaan Ka Nang Kailangan Kita by Mel Chionglo
- Developed by: ABS-CBN Studios
- Written by: Ruby Leah Castro; Jillmer S. Dy; Jaja Amarillo; Allan Ibañez; Carlo Katigbak; Mary Lhuvirizz Martin; Priscilla Hidalgo; Dexter Hemedez
- Directed by: Jeffrey Jeturian; Mervyn B. Brondial; Cathy O. Camarillo
- Starring: Vina Morales; Denise Laurel; Jane Oineza; Loisa Andalio; Jerome Ponce; Joshua Garcia; Christian Vasquez
- Opening theme: "Tunay na Mahal" by Juris
- Composers: Freddie Saturno; Jonathan Manalo
- Country of origin: Philippines
- Original language: Filipino
- No. of episodes: 192

Production
- Executive producers: Carlo Katigbak; Cory Vidanes; Laurenti Dyogi; Ginny Monteagudo-Ocampo
- Producers: Mark Anthony D. Gile; Marielle de Guzman-Navarro
- Production locations: Itogon, Benguet, Philippines; Subic, Zambales, Philippines; Manila, Philippines; Canada; Taipei, Taiwan
- Cinematography: Neil Daza
- Editor: Joy Buenaventura
- Running time: 30–35 minutes
- Production company: GMO Entertainment Unit

Original release
- Network: ABS-CBN
- Release: January 19 – October 16, 2015

Related
- Nasaan Ka Nang Kailangan Kita (1986 film)

Nasaan Ka Nang Kailangan Kita (International title: Waiting for Love / transl. where were you when i needed you) is a 2015 Philippine television drama revenge series broadcast by ABS-CBN. The series is based on the 1986 Philippine film of the same title. Directed by Jeffrey Jeturian, Mervyn B. Brondial and Cathy O. Camarillo, it stars Vina Morales, Denise Laurel, Jane Oineza, Loisa Andalio, Jerome Ponce, Joshua Garcia and Christian Vasquez. It aired on the network's Kapamilya Gold line up and worldwide on TFC from January 19 to October 16, 2015 replacing Kapamilya Blockbusters and was replaced by Walang Iwanan.

The series was streaming online on YouTube.

== Synopsis ==
In the town of Itogon, Benguet lived a happy family with Dolores, Paciano, and their daughter Cecilia. One day, Paciano decides to work in Manila. He goes back and forth every day to his job, which complicates Dolores and Cecilia. One day, Cecilia awakens and Paciano disappeared. She waits for her father but has never returned.

Cecilia's dream of going to Manila will become true. She and her mother moved to Manila so Cecilia can go to college in order to find her father. Her hopes and dreams shatter when she discovers that her father has another family and that she doesn't have enough money for college. Cecilia and Dolores survived in Manila by selling food in front of a university, where Cecilia meets Leandro, who starts off as her tutor but they eventually fall in love with each other. At their school dance, Cecilia and Leandro go to a dark library and Cecilia gets pregnant. She agrees to marry Leandro for the sake of their child. After the two got married, Dolores later dies from cancer while holding her newborn granddaughter Corrine in her arms.

Many years passed, Cecilia does everything she can for her family; her husband Leandro, and her children Corrine and Bea. Their life is about to change when Leandro meets his new assistant at work, Toni, who eventually falls in love with him. She seduces Leandro in her car and eventually, she gets pregnant, resulting in Leandro losing his job. Cecilia learns about what Leandro had done from Toni's father Florencio, owner of Briones and Company. Cecilia tells Leandro to stay away and live with Toni, and her daughters become heartbroken seeing their father leaving them. Since that very moment, Corrine and Bea vow to patch the broken pieces of their family together.

A few years pass, Corrine attends UDM (Universidad de Monteagudo) for college and meets Ryan, Toni's younger brother. They eventually fall in love and will have a child of their own. However, when Cecilia reconciles with her childhood friend Carlo, the complication with her husband gets more intense. But Leandro still fights for his wife and will not give up on their marriage. Because of Leandro's unconditional love for Cecilia, he and Carlo eventually face each other and the friendship didn't seem to be working.

While dating Ryan, Corrine's childhood friend Joel is still in love with her and is seen as overprotective of her. When Bea admits to being in love with Joel at a dance, Joel is a bit taken aback and Bea flees the dance and eventually to a new student's arms. This complicates Joel and Bea's friendship after Bea stops hanging out with him and leans more toward a new boy in her life than Joel. Joel realizes over time that he is no longer in love with Corrine and loves Bea now, who promises to fight for him. Bea eventually chooses Joel and they begin their relationship.

In the end, when Carlo searches for himself and his life, he goes back to his wife and decides to live with her and his children. Toni and Andrew move to Australia to start brand new. Meanwhile, Corrine labored her baby with Ryan. Although premature, they still loved the baby and accept him. Corrine and Cecilia finally reconcile and the latter welcome the baby to the family. Cecilia and Leandro finally fixed their marriage and reconciled as well. When everything is peaceful and her family is reunited, Cecilia returns to her old hometown where she finally found her long-lost father Paciano, and the family lived happily all together.

== Cast and characters ==
=== Main cast ===
- Vina Morales as Cecilia B. Macaraeg-Natividad
- Denise Laurel as Toni Briones
- Jane Oineza as Corrine M. Natividad-Briones
- Loisa Andalio as Beatriz "Bea" M. Natividad
- Joshua Garcia as Joel Galvez
- Jerome Ponce as Ryan Briones
- Christian Vasquez as Leandro Natividad

=== Supporting cast ===
- Aleck Bovick as Chynna "Ching" Galvez
- Christopher Roxas as Nicanor "Kanor" Galvez
- Santino Espiñoza as Andrew B. Natividad
- Maila Gumila as Norma Briones
- Sue Prado as Kristel
- Emmanuelle Vera as Chloe
- Eslove Briones as Omeng

=== Guest cast ===
- Johnny Revilla as Florencio Briones
- Wendy Valdez as Imelda
- Jon Lucas as Allan
- Kazel Kinouchi as Phoebe
- Lorenzo Mara as Atty. dela Rosa
- Nina Ricci Alagao as Ms. Quinn
- Chienna Filomeno as Steph
- Christian Bables as Dwayne
- Pauline Palomique as Tess
- Via Carillo as Lianne
- Jose Sarasola as Mike
- Marx Topacio as UDM Basketball Coach
- Manolo Pedrosa as Alex
- Levi Ignacio as Pancho Macaraeg

=== Special participation ===
- Richard Yap as Carlo "Caloy" Asuncion
- Dominic Ochoa as young Pancho
- Ina Raymundo as Dolores Buyaao-Macaraeg
- Dexie Daulat as young Cecilia
- Sue Ramirez as teen Cecilia
- Arron Villaflor as teen Leandro
- McCoy de Leon as teen Caloy
- Beauty Gonzalez as teen Ching
- Arran Sese as teen Kanor
- Hannah Valenzuela as young Corrine
- Juvy Lyn Bison as young Bea
- Kim Llono as young Joel
- Lance Lucido as young Caloy

== Official soundtrack ==
Nasaan Ka Nang Kailangan Kita (Songs from the Heart)

Soundtrack album by Various
- Released: October 1, 2015
- Recorded: 2015
- Genres: OPM, Pop, Soundtrack
- Length: 46:00
- Language: Filipino
- Label: Star Music

Nasaan Ka Nang Kailangan Kita (Songs from the Heart)
No.	Title	Performer(s)	Length
1.	"Tunay Na Mahal"	Juris	4:09
2.	"Mahal Ko O Mahal Ako"	Kyla	4:10
3.	"Hindi Ko Kaya"	Vina Morales and Denise Laurel	4:57
4.	"Pag-Ibig"	Jane Oineza and Loisa Andalio	5:17
5.	"Walang Iba"	Jane Oineza, Jerome Ponce, Loisa Andalio and Joshua Garcia	4:28
6.	"Tunay Na Mahal (Instrumental Version)"	Juris	4:09
7.	"Mahal Ko O Mahal Ako (Instrumental Version)"	Kyla	4:10
8.	"Hindi Ko Kaya (Instrumental Version)"	Vina Morales and Denise Laurel	4:57
9.	"Pag-Ibig (Instrumental Version)"	Jane Oineza and Loisa Andalio	5:17
10.	"Walang Iba"	Jane Oineza, Jerome Ponce, Loisa Andalio and Joshua Garcia	4:26
Total length:			46:00

== Production ==
=== Casting ===
It was originally announced to be Oineza's first starring role in a teleserye after her big stint from the recent season of Pinoy Big Brother. In the trade launch trailer, Marco Gumabao was initially part of the cast, but was later moved to Forevermore. He was later replaced by Be Careful with My Heart star Jerome Ponce for the final casting.

=== Scheduling ===
Nasaan Ka Nang Kailangan Kita, initially planned to be part of the Primetime Bida evening block, was originally planned to replace the Korean drama Faith. However, the timeslot was later announced as part of Kapamilya Gold afternoon block. The drama was promoted and premiered back-to-back with Oh My G! and FlordeLiza as part of Kapamilya's "Thank You Day" on January 19, 2015.

== Broadcast ==
Nasaan Ka Nang Kailangan Kita premiered on January 19, 2015.

=== Re-runs ===
The show began airing re-runs on Jeepney TV from September 7, 2019 to February 15, 2020; May 24, 2021 to February 11, 2022; and March 31, 2024 to February 15, 2026.

== Ratings ==
Kantar Media National TV ratings
PILOT EPISODE	FINALE EPISODE	PEAK	AVERAGE	SOURCE
8.9% (3:25pm)	17.0% (4:15pm)	18.5% (4:15pm)	N/A	

== Awards and nominations ==
Year	Award / Recognition	Category	Nominee	Result	Ref.
2015	29th PMPC Star Awards for Television	Best Daytime Drama Series	Nasaan Ka Nang Kailangan Kita	Nominated	
2015	29th PMPC Star Awards for Television	Best New Male TV Personality	Joshua Garcia	Nominated	
2015	29th PMPC Star Awards for Television	Best New Female TV Personality	Loisa Andalio	Nominated	

== See also ==
- List of programs broadcast by ABS-CBN
- List of ABS-CBN Studios original drama series
- List of programs broadcast by Jeepney TV
