= Hanggang Saan =

2017–18 Philippine television drama series

- Title card
- Also known as: A Mother's Guilt
- Genre: Family drama; Romance; Crime; Suspense; Thriller
- Created by: Mel Mendoza-Del Rosario
- Written by: Ruby Leah Castro-Villanueva; Jaja Amarillo; Cyrus Dan Cañares; Jaymar Castro; Riccilyn Santos
- Directed by: Mervyn B. Brondial; Jeffrey R. Jeturian; Topel Lee; Paco A. Sta. Maria
- Creative director: Johnny Delos Santos
- Starring: Sylvia Sanchez; Arjo Atayde; Sue Ramirez; Maris Racal; Yves Flores; Teresa Loyzaga; Ariel Rivera
- Opening theme: "Sa Ngalan ng Pag-ibig" by Jessa Zaragoza
- Composer: Jonathan Manalo
- Country of origin: Philippines
- Original language: Filipino
- No. of seasons: 2
- No. of episodes: 108 (list of episodes)

Production
- Executive producers: Carlo Katigbak; Cory Vidanes; Laurenti Dyogi; Ginny Monteagudo-Ocampo
- Producers: Macy Delos Santos; Marielle de Guzman-Navarro; Mark Anthony D. Gile
- Production locations: Manila, Philippines
- Editor: Joy Buenaventura
- Running time: 30–35 minutes
- Production company: GMO Unit

Original release
- Network: ABS-CBN
- Release: November 27, 2017 – April 27, 2018

Hanggang Saan (International title: A Mother's Guilt / transl. Up to What Point) is a Philippine television drama series broadcast by ABS-CBN. Directed by Mervyn B. Brondial, Jeffrey R. Jeturian, Topel Lee and Paco A. Sta. Maria, it stars Sylvia Sanchez, Arjo Atayde, Sue Ramirez, Maris Racal, Yves Flores, Teresa Loyzaga and Ariel Rivera. It aired on the network's Kapamilya Gold line up and worldwide on TFC from November 27, 2017 to April 27, 2018.

The series is streaming online on YouTube.

== Plot ==
This fictional television series follows the lives of two women whose contrasting lives cross paths one desperate day when wrong choices and a tragic incident change their lives forever. Sonya Alipio (Sylvia Sanchez) is a low-income single mother of two boys, Paco and Domeng, who works hard for her family, deposits a portion of her hard-earned money every month into a financial educational plan sold by an established company called Educare to ensure her sons have the funds for their college or university.

When Sonya is unable to cash out her investments in Educare to pay for her son's heart surgery, she confronts Educare's president Edward Lamoste (Eric Quizon). The confrontation turns ugly when Edward begs her to kill him instead so his wife and child benefit from his life insurance. As both struggle with the gun, Edward is shot. Frightened and ignorant about due process, Mang Asyong (Sonya's friend who witnesses the altercation) urges her to run away while he disposes of the gun. Back at the hospital, her son's operation is successful. Edward is rushed to the same hospital and declared dead on arrival.

Jean Lamoste is Edward's widow and mother of a young daughter, Ana, who is the same age as Paco. The two women meet at the hospital chapel and a bond is forged as two strangers comfort each other. Jean vows to seek her husband's murderer, while Sonya is torn between reporting the truth to the authorities. Her friend Asyong advises her not to abandon her young sons by going to jail. She decides to follow his advice when someone else, a disgruntled policy holder, is accused and jailed for the murder.

Twelve years later, the two women's lives cross paths once again when their children become acquainted. Her son Paco (Arjo Atayde) is a lawyer, bar exam top-notcher and Ana (Sue Ramirez) is a New York-trained chef planning to open a restaurant in Manila. They fall in love, a relationship that is welcomed at first, then opposed because of the conflict arising from subsequent events between the Alipio and Montecillos. As relations become adversarial between both families, Ana and Paco decide to end their relationship. Paco moves on and falls in love with his colleague Atty. Georgette San Diego.

Through the years, while Sonya thinks her past is behind her, Jean marries her husband's partner Jacob Montecillo (Ariel Rivera) and focuses her time on a new advocacy: reaching out to Educare's policy holders as redemption for Educare's failure. Jean recognizes Sonya as the same woman in the hospital the night Edward died and learns later that she was an Educare policy holder.

When new developments in Edward's murder investigation surfaces, a heavy conscience drives Sonya to give herself up and she is charged and imprisoned. Paco is the lead counsel defending her, assisted by his law school classmate and girlfriend, Atty. Georgette San Diego (Maxine Medina), and together they set out to prove Sonya's innocence. After analyzing the forensic evidence presented to them at Discovery, both lawyers question the verifiability of Sonya's statements. They find two crucial evidence missing, Edward's gun and the ballistic report establishing the real assassin's gun as the weapon that killed him.

Unknown by all, Edward's real killer is an assassin hired by Jacob Montecillo, Edward's childhood best friend and business partner. Jacob has long coveted Edward's life, his wife, money and his father's admiration, so he steals Educare's funds, has Edward killed and marries his widow. Sonya's unexpected visit that night creates a perfect cover and helps him get away with murder. He later has his right-hand man Roman retrieve and dispose all evidence linking him to Edward's murder and Educare's bankruptcy.

At the summation in Sonya's trial, the Judge hands Sonya a guilty verdict for homicide, but not first-degree murder. Instead of a life sentence, she receives a 15-year sentence, granting her bail to allow her legal team to prepare for her appeal. Sonya accepts this as retribution for the 12 years she robbed Gabriel for a crime she knew he did not commit. Nevertheless, her family and legal team pursue the unknown shooter angle, leading them to Jacob's direct connection with Educare's bankruptcy and Edward Lamoste's murder.

Meanwhile, characters related to Jacob Montecillo suffer misfortunes as Jacob begins to get rid of all evidence and contacts linking him to Educare's illegal transactions. Julia, the bank manager directly involved with Jacob and Educare is found dead from an apparent suicide, but authorities are considering foul play, leading to an NBI deep dive of Julia's dealings with Educare. Katrina, Jean's former assistant possessing evidence of Jacob's illegal money transfers to the fictitious Editha Fuentabella account, is kidnapped and eventually killed. Jacob kills his right-hand man, Roman when he turns himself over to Paco as a material witness against Jacob. Yaya Letty (Ces Quesada), Ana and Jean's long-time retainer, approaches Paco with her insights about Jacob Montecillo, admitting she witnessed Jacob suspiciously throw something over the bridge when she followed him one evening. This draws Ana and Paco to collaborate with Georgette, and the three find credible evidence proving Jacob's involvement. Ana who suspects Jacob's direct hand in her father's death urges her mother to leave him. Angered by Ana's allegations, Jacob arranges to have her killed along with the Alipios, all narrowly losing their lives to several assassination attempts. Jean later discovers Jacob's murder list. Furious at his duplicity, she enlists an unlikely ally to help bring down Jacob: Sonya. To protect their children from Jacob's wrath, the two mothers decide to secretly work together. Jean pretends to remain by Jacob's side as she gathers evidence of Jacob's illegal activities and leaks it to social media and Atty. Vega's legal team.

Elsewhere, Forensic investigation unearths Edward's missing gun and a bullet lodged in the breastplate of the Virgin Mary statue, and the crime lab verifies it as the bullet fired from his gun, clearing Sonya of the crime. Sadly, tragedy hits Atty. Vega's camp when Atty. Georgette is killed by Jacob's assassins as she fights to protect the integrity of the evidence and Paco is devastated. Nonetheless, Atty. Vega's camp bring Jacob to trial as the mastermind of Edward's murder, the attempted murder of Paco and Domeng, and the embezzlement of Educare.

The beleaguered Jacob attempts to leave the country twice and Jean alerts Sonya's legal team both times. A departure hold was handed the first time, with Jacob landing in jail. Although charged with a non bailable offense, his influence extends to a judge who grants him bail. On their second attempt, Jacob and Jean try to leave on a yacht at the Freeport Area of Bataan that would take them to the southernmost part of Mindanao, the backdoor exit from the Philippines. Jean alerts Sonya again. Despite the NBI's full participation, Jacob manages to avoid capture and Jean is shot in the crossfire. Jacob becomes the subject of a nationwide manhunt but is subsequently captured when he visits Jean's gravesite.

=== Finale ===
At Jacob's trial, Atty. Vega's team presents solid evidence and witness testimonies of Jacob's crimes, including a testimony from Don Miguel Montecillo, Jacob's father, who confirms his wife overheard Jacob discuss Edward's murder over the phone. Jacob retaliates with a series of bombings targeting Sonya's family, Atty. Vega and Ana Lamoste which results to Don Miguel's death.

The court finds Jacob guilty on all counts, with a life sentence for Edward Lamoste's murder. Despite the guilty verdicts, the Alipios and the Lamostes are uneasy, more so after Jean visits Jacob in prison. Realizing that Jean's death was a trap to lure him in, Jacob's grief over his father's death turns to rage and he warns Jean that he would kill the Alipios as revenge for everything that went wrong in his life. Not willing to take any chances, Jean and Sonya prepare to leave and start new lives, the Lamostes to Seattle and the Alipios to Cebu. Jacob executes his revenge, blackmailing his politician uncle to allow him to escape prison, use his private properties to lure and kill the Alipios. He kidnaps Jean and Sonya, using them as baits for their children to rescue them. Ana and the local enforcement team figures out Jacob's hiding place for her mother, successfully rescues Jean, but the uncle divulges another bombshell: Jacob used two separate hiding locations so he could keep Jean away from any crossfire as he guns down the Alipios. The NBI works with the Alipio brothers to rescue Sonya, but Jacob manages to capture Paco and Domeng and proceeds to terrorize them in front of their mother. Shots are fired when they try to escape, critically wounding Sonya and Paco but Paco manages to kill Jacob.

“Evil will not always win. Good will always triumph though we often wondered why we had to suffer for Jacob’s crimes. But in the end, Jacob did pay with his life and Justice was served.” Domeng points this out during an interview for a national TV documentary on Jacob Montecillo and the Edward Lamoste murder. Joining him at the interview were his mother and brother Paco who had both survived the shooting.

Five years later after the incident, Domeng is a successful architect who designs and constructs their new home while Paco is Senior Partner of the Law Firm of Vega Alipio & Associates. The Alipios and Lamostes are healed of the trauma Jacob wrought on their lives. Ana returns from Seattle, looks for and finds Paco who is on vacation with his mom and brother at Baler. They get together and resume their relationship.

== Cast and characters ==
=== Main cast ===
- Sylvia Sanchez as Sonya Magat-Alipio
- Arjo Atayde as Atty. Francisco "Paco" Alipio
- Yves Flores as Ar. Dominic "Domeng" Garibay-Alipio
- Sue Ramirez as Anna Michelle Lamoste
- Ariel Rivera as Jacob Montecillo
- Teresa Loyzaga as Jean Saavedra-Lamoste/Montecillo

=== Supporting cast ===
- Maris Racal as Vanessa "Nessa" Gonzales
- Nanding Josef as Asyong
- Ces Quesada as Letty
- Maxine Medina as Atty. Georgette Sandiego
- Rommel Padilla as John Joseph "Jojo" Lagrimas
- Karl Medina as Dindo
- Anna Luna as Rizalina "Lina" Bonifacio
- Maila Gumila as Atty. Lorna Vega
- Junjun Quintana as Roman Mataya
- Jenny Miller as Katrina
- Sue Prado as Marjorie
- Claire Ruiz as Atty. Joanne Dimalanta
- Sharmaine Suarez as Mabel Gonzales
- Marlo Mortel as Unyo
- Mercedes Cabral as Carolina Dela Guerra
- Viveika Ravanes as Cora
- Arnold Reyes as Gabriel Dela Guerra
- Fred Lo as Brian Climaco
- Rolando Inocencio as Atty. Balmaceda
- Marco Gumabao as Archie
- Mari Kaimo as Judge Ignacio Tortuga
- Rubi Rubi as Pinky
- Christopher Tan as Rico
- Tanya Gomez as Mayora
- Nikko Natividad as Samboy

=== Special participation ===
- Eric Quizon as Edward Lamoste
- Carmi Martin as Margaret Cruz
- Yñigo Delen as young Dominic "Domeng" Alipio
- Luke Alford as young Francisco "Paco" Alipio
- Allyson McBride as young Anna Michelle Lamoste
- Levi Ignacio as Lester Lee
- Alicia Alonzo as Doña Miranda Montoya-Montecillo
- Robert Arevalo† as Don Miguel Montecillo

== Accolades ==
Year	Award	Category	Recipients	Result	Ref.
2018	32nd PMPC Star Awards for Television				
2018	32nd PMPC Star Awards for Television	Best Drama Actor	Arjo Atayde	Nominated	
2018	32nd PMPC Star Awards for Television	Best Drama Actress	Sylvia Sanchez	Nominated	
2018	32nd PMPC Star Awards for Television	Best Daytime Drama Series	Hanggang Saan	Nominated	
2018	32nd PMPC Star Awards for Television	Best Drama Supporting Actor	Arnold Reyes and Ariel Rivera	Nominated	
2018	32nd PMPC Star Awards for Television	Best New Female TV Personality	Maxine Medina	Nominated	

== Broadcast ==
The series originally aired on ABS-CBN from November 27, 2017 to April 27, 2018.

=== Re-runs ===
The show aired re-runs on Jeepney TV from February 1 to April 16, 2021 (replacing the re-runs of The Killer Bride); June 20 to September 2, 2022 (replacing the re-runs of Sana Bukas pa ang Kahapon); March 9, 2024 to February 15, 2025 (replacing the re-runs of The Good Son); and May 18 to July 31, 2026 (replacing the re-runs of Kambal sa Uma).

== International adaptation ==
- A Turkish adaptation titled Bir Annenin Günahı ("A Mother's Guilt") aired on Kanal D every Saturday 8:00 p.m., from November 21, 2020, to December 19, 2020. It had five episodes with a running time of 130 minutes each. Originally slated to air on FOX Turkey in March 2020, the drama was produced by Limon Yapim and starred Özge Özberk as Suna and Mert Yazıcıoğlu as her son Yusuf. This was the first Turkish adaptation of a Philippine soap opera.

== See also ==
- List of programs broadcast by ABS-CBN
- List of ABS-CBN Studios original drama series
