= List of Hanggang Saan episodes =

Hanggang Saan (International title: A Mother's Guilt / transl. Up to What Point) is a 2017 Philippine family drama television series starring real life mother and son Sylvia Sanchez & Arjo Atayde, together with Sue Ramirez, Maris Racal and Yves Flores. The show was aired on ABS-CBN's Kapamilya Gold afternoon block and worldwide on The Filipino Channel from November 27, 2017 to April 27, 2018, replacing The Promise of Forever.

The story introduces Sonya (Sanchez), a brave mother who will do everything to give her sons a good life. They will also meet mother and daughter Jean (Loyzaga) and Anna (Ramirez), who will become their closest friends and change their lives. Sonya gets herself in a perilous situation where she kills an innocent man in order to prolong the life of her son, Paco (Atayde). How far would a mother go to love and protect the life of her child?

== Series overview ==
Season	Episodes	Originally released	
Season	Episodes	First released	Last released
1	85	November 27, 2017	March 23, 2018
2	23	March 26, 2018	April 27, 2018

== Episodes ==
=== Book 1 ===
No. overall	No. in season	Title	Original release date	Kantar Media Ratings (Nationwide)	AGB Nielsen Ratings (NUTAM People)
1	1	"Ang Simula"	November 27, 2017	12.9%	3.7%
Sonya, a loving mother, is prepared to do everything for the sake of her children. When her son, Paco, is diagnosed with a fatal heart disease requiring immediate surgery, Sonya decides to retrieve the money she invested in Educare. Her efforts, however, prove to be futile because the company declares bankruptcy. Sonya confronts Edward Lamoste, Educare's President, who tells her he has nothing left to give except his watch. He asks her to kill him so his wife and child can benefit from his life insurance. A struggle ensues and Edward is shot.
2	2	"Lalaban"	November 28, 2017	11.2%	3.3%
Sonya gets involved in Edward's assisted suicide to pay for Paco's hospitalization. Despite being overwhelmed with guilt, Sonya rushes to Paco's side as soon as the deed is done. With things looking bleak for Paco, Sonya promises to pay for her crimes in exchange for her son's survival. By some miracle, Paco survives and Sonya breathes a sigh of relief. However, her guilt immediately resurfaces as she crosses paths with Edward's family.
3	3	"Ang Pangarap"	November 29, 2017	11.7%	TBA
Twelve years after Edward's death, Sonya manages to live a normal life alongside her children. Jean later comes across some information about Sonya that leads to another meeting between them. Meanwhile, after graduating from law school, Paco hopes to fulfill his dreams to become a successful lawyer.
4	4	"Maglihim"	November 30, 2017	12.1%	3.9%
After discovering Sonya's history as an EduCare policy holder, Jean decides that she must meet her again. She finds a way to lure Sonya to her home with the intention of confronting the latter about her secret. Later, both Jean and Sonya are shaken by an update regarding Edward's murder case. Plagued by her conscience, Sonya seeks help from an old friend. Meanwhile, Paco returns Anna's passport and gets the opportunity to spend more time with her.
5	5	"Paglalapitin"	December 1, 2017	12.7%	3.8%
Jacob advises Jean not to approach Gabriel for her own safety. However, a heated confrontation prompts Jean to confront her deceased husband's killer. After asking Sonya to come with her, Jean is surprised to meet a familiar face in prison. Meanwhile, Anna asks Paco to take her to the cemetery before they head for Baler. Soon after, Asyong becomes surprised upon learning that the children of Edward and Sonya are acquainted.
6	6	"Uusigin"	December 4, 2017	10.6%	3.3%
A confrontation erupts between Jean and Gabriel in jail. Jean then shares with Sonya her reaction about Gabriel's baseless accusation. Roman, on the other hand, advises Jacob to eliminate a person that could spill their involvement in Edward's downfall.
7	7	"Makikilala"	December 5, 2017	11.3%	3.3%
As Anna and her friends enjoy the sands and waves, her relationship with Paco grows ever closer. Soon, Paco is able to save Anna from possible humiliation. The following day, Anna makes Paco experience the sights and sounds of Baler. Meanwhile, Jean goes the extra mile, hoping to make amends with Sonya. Unbeknownst to her, Jacob gives Katrina a task that might expose the former policy holder's darkest secret.
8	8	"Konektado"	December 6, 2017	11.7%	3.4%
While swimming, Paco talks about a mark from his past. Anna, on the other hand, reveals a terrible tragedy that coincides with the day of Paco's heart attack. Meanwhile, Paco's chivalrous personality gets a thumbs up from someone dearest to Anna. Katrina's discovery about Sonya has made Jacob confirm his hunches about the former policy holder.
9	9	"Pagtatagpuin"	December 7, 2017	11.2%	3.2%
Upon receiving news about the car accident involving their respective children, Sonya and Jean rush to the hospital separately. There, Jean is surprised to find out that their lives are more intertwined than expected. Unfortunately for Sonya, this only causes more concern for her already troubled conscience. Unbeknownst to Jean, Katrina finds a way to snoop on her and Sonya's connection. Meanwhile, Domeng gains an opportunity to help Sonya.
10	10	"Ipipilit"	December 8, 2017	11%	3.3%
Paco learns that Atty. Vega's law office is looking for legal assistants. Immediately, he reaches out to the lawyer and, the following day, learns how feisty she can be. Soon, he is given a task that could lead to the discovery of his mother's desperately-kept secret. His new job, however, does not sit well with Sonya, who then rushes to an old friend to pacify her plaguing conscience. Meanwhile, Jacob sends a daunting threat to a clueless Paco.
11	11	"Ang Unang Halik"	December 11, 2017	10.5%	3.6%
Terrified by the ghost of her past, Sonya becomes worried upon learning about Paco's deepening friendship with Edward's daughter, Anna. After receiving a possible lead about the threats she is receiving, Atty. Vega gives Paco a daunting task. Later, Paco accompanies Anna to Escolta. There, Anna's mood turns gloomy upon seeing something that reminds her of her late father. Paco then brings Anna somewhere and finds a way to ease her pain.
12	12	"Ipagtatapat"	December 12, 2017	10.4%	3.2%
Feeling guilty, Paco confesses his feelings for Anna. However, Paco fears that admitting to Anna his connection to Atty. Vega, the lawyer of Gabriel, might hamper their budding romance. Later, Paco's shocking discovery about Edward's murder may have opened another lead in the investigation. Meanwhile, Jean's birthday begins with a sweet surprise from Jacob. Sonya, on the other hand, sees her attendance to the party as a way to make it up to Jean.
13	13	"Ang Kaarawan"	December 13, 2017	11.4%	3.5%
Jean gets a warm reception from Jacob's parents on her birthday. The case isn't the same for Jacob, unfortunately, as he receives criticism from his own father. Aside from Jean, Paco also has a reason to celebrate as he and Anna finally talk. However, they are both mindful that she has to soon return to New York. Katrina, meanwhile, carries out a wicked plan that would put the Alipios in a bad light.
14	14	"Ang Akusasyon"	December 14, 2017	10.9%	3.6%
In the middle of Jean's birthday celebration, Anna looks back on how her mother stood strong for her in the midst of losing their patriarch, Edward. Later, Don Miguel suspects that he's a victim of a theft. Katrina's plan, then, comes to fruition as the Alipios are placed under scrutiny. Confident of their innocence, Paco dares the Montecillos to justify their claims. Soon after, Jacob contends his assumptions about Sonya to Jean, only to get slapped by a bold realization in return.
15	15	"Mamanipulahin"	December 15, 2017	12.5%	3.8%
The Alipios are taken into custody by the security officers following the alleged theft incident. Despite Jacob's efforts to implicate the young Alipio, Sonya and Paco remain in denial of the accusations pitting Domeng. Aware that his brother being jailed without due process is unfair, Paco makes use of his legislative knowledge to defend Domeng. He then demands the Montecillos to prove their claims, while Anna assures Paco of her confidence to the Alipios. Later, Domeng realizes what his greatest fear is while in the middle of the turmoil.
16	16	"Ang Pagtanggap"	December 18, 2017	12.6%	3.3%
Eager to hide his involvement in EduCare's anomaly, Jacob commands Roman to keep a close watch on Atty. Vega's actions. Determined to make amends with the Alipios, Jean and Anna pay them a visit. Later on, Sonya finally makes a big decision for Domeng's sake. Meanwhile, Paco attempts to divulge vital information to Anna about Edward's case. Elsewhere, Jean inadvertently obtains an important file in Sonya's house.
17	17	"Maghihinala"	December 19, 2017	10.5%	3.2%
Katrina eagerly looks to redeem herself to Jacob by continuing her investigation on Sonya. Upon learning her personal task, Roman advises Katrina to turn her focus instead on the next moves of Gabriel's camp. She goes to Atty. Vega's law firm and arrives at a startling discovery. Soon, Jacob learns about this, intensifying his rage against the Alipios. Meanwhile, Sonya's openness to the possibility of getting imprisoned alarms a close friend.
18	18	"Patutunayan"	December 20, 2017	10.5%	2.9%
Anna loses her trust in Paco after confirming the latter's ties with Gabriel's lawyer, Atty. Vega. Anna then hits a new low after hearing Paco's statement regarding Edward's murder case. Soon after, Anna finds solace in Jean, who wonders if Sonya has knowledge concerning Paco's secret job. Sonya reminds her son of the repercussions should he continue to contend Gabriel's innocence. Sensing that the truth behind Edward's murder may be discovered soon, Sonya hopes to be forgiven for the crime she committed.
19	19	"Maniniwala"	December 21, 2017	11.3%	2.9%
After learning about Paco's findings concerning Edward's murder, Anna seeks to know if Gabriel was rightly convicted. Soon after, she meets Paco, who stands by his principles and vows to seek justice for her father in the name of love. She then informs her family about Paco's discovery. However, her question regarding moments prior to Edward's death alarms her stepfather. On the other hand, Jacob is adamant that no one will get in their way of sabotaging Gabriel's final verdict.
20	20	"Mauunahan"	December 22, 2017	10.3%	3.7%
Seeing the young Alipio as a hindrance to his heinous plan, Jacob sends a daunting threat to Paco. Afterward, he discovers a loophole in the murder case that could dictate Gabriel's final verdict. As such, he tasks Roman to cover the same as the final hearing draws near. Meanwhile, unfazed by Jacob's stern warning, Paco tries to gather information about Edward's murder case. Unfortunately, his unethical romance with Anna coupled by an adversity concerning a substantial piece of evidence creates unwanted hunches among members of Atty. Vega's camp.
21	21	"Magmamahal"	December 25, 2017	8.7%	3.0%
Eager to uncover the truth about Edward's case, Rizalina meets with Paco. She then shares with Paco her hunch about Edward's real murderer. Later, Paco gets renewed hope upon getting a vital lead in Edward's case. Anna, on the other hand, musters up the courage to bid Paco goodbye before she leaves for New York. Meanwhile, Jacob and Roman continue their pursuit of Edward's missing wrist watch.
22	22	"Komplikado"	December 26, 2017	10.9%	3.7%
On her last day in the country, Anna bids farewell to her loved ones, including Paco. She later discovers something that may link to her father's death. Paco, on the other hand, relays Rizalina's findings concerning Edward's murder case to Atty. Vega. As such, the feisty lawyer believes that the new information will help prove her client's innocence. Unfortunately for Gabriel's camp, Jacob tries to mislead their search for a substantial piece of evidence by dirty means.
23	23	"Aamin"	December 27, 2017	11.4%	4.0%
After receiving a scholarship by surprise, Domeng makes good use of his unused tuition fee by helping a good friend. Meanwhile, Anna's discovery, which she feels has something to do with her father's death, prompts her to stay in the country for good. Paco, on the other hand, finally meets the person who has Edward's missing watch, Mr. Lee. Though failing to gather enough information, the watch salesman still ends up to be of some use to Atty. Vega. The development of the case reaches Sonya, who fears that her son will found out the truth from someone else.
24	24	"Madidiskubre"	December 28, 2017	11.3%	3.7%
Delighted that she has decided to stay in the country for good, Paco asks Anna to continue their romance. He also learns of a discovery she made, which made her commit to being involved in the investigation. Soon after, Anna tries to get more information from her family about their past. Sonya, meanwhile, continues to share her blessings to others after rushing to Asyong's aid. Regardless of the success she is currently having, her dark past comes back and haunts her.
25	25	"Pagtatakpan"	December 29, 2017	11%	3.3%
Seeing it first-hand, Dindo affirms to Roman that another person, particularly a woman, was at the crime scene during Edward's murder. Soon after, he is tasked to look for that possible witness just before the final hearing commences. Unfortunately for Roman, he receives a vicious threat following the confirmation. He, then, goes after an enemy behind prison walls, in hopes of redeeming himself. Meanwhile, Anna finally says "yes" to Paco.
26	26	"Hahabulin"	January 1, 2018	10.7%	3.3%
Dindo sets to find the woman he saw during Edward's murder. He later confirms the woman's identity to Roman, which catches the latter by surprise. Determined to uncover the truth behind her father's murder, Anna asks Paco's help to get information about a woman who might have a connection to Edward. Paco, however, finds it hard to help her due to his affiliation with Atty. Vega. Meanwhile, Sonya helps Unyo and Asyong with their new plight.
27	27	"Ang Pangamba"	January 2, 2018	13%	3.7%
Seeing Carolina suffer because of her husband's fate, Paco encourages the former by telling her that Gabriel's case still has hope. Unknown to him, however, Gabriel's life is caught into a web of schemes behind bars. Meanwhile, Sonya helps Asyong and Unyo find a home after they lost theirs due to demolition. However, despite Sonya's good deed, a newfound danger looms over her life and her family's. Later, Paco introduces Anna to his family.
28	28	"Ang Sakripisyo"	January 3, 2018	11.5%	3.8%
Jacob finally discovers the identity of the woman he is searching for. Suspicious of Sonya's real intentions for befriending his family, Jacob resorts to eliminate her to cut the loose ends on Edward's case. Meanwhile, Gabriel deduces that he is in grave danger. Continuing her own investigation, Anna is led to a speculation that Jacob is involved with Edward's demise. Elsewhere, Domeng musters the guts to admit his feelings for Nessa.
29	29	"Haharapin"	January 4, 2018	11.4%	3.7%
Sonya and Domeng attend to Asyong and Unyo as the two move into their home. Meanwhile, thinking that the Lamostes have plotted against Gabriel's life, Carolina confronts and assaults Jean. Enraged for meddling with his plans, Jacob then beats Roman. He also rebukes the latter for putting Jean's life in danger. Later, Roman sends a package to Sonya.
30	30	"Binabagabag"	January 5, 2017	11.4%	3.1%
Determined to prove Jacob's involvement in Edward's demise, Anna continues her investigation. However, Anna's persistence leads to a confrontation with her mother and stepfather. Jacob, meanwhile, becomes worried by the development of Anna's investigation. He moves to cover his tracks, resolving to hide the truth by any means possible. Elsewhere, Sonya becomes troubled after receiving a package from an unknown sender. Seeing Sonya's worry, Asyong comes to a decision.
31	31	"Ang Patibong"	January 8, 2018	11%	3.5%
Jean and Anna feel nervous now that the Supreme Court will soon hand down its verdict on Edward's murder case. Paco comforts Anna and reminds her that the result should not affect their relationship. Just before the ceremony starts, Paco receives news of a family emergency. Meanwhile, Sonya comes face-to-face with Roman's henchwoman concerning her involvement in Edward's murder. Unwillingly, Sonya falls into a serious trap.
32	32	"Susuko"	January 9, 2018	12%	3.9%
Sonya admits her crime to her children after falling prey to Roman's trap. Completely clueless, Paco and Domeng are devastated with their mother's sudden confession. Meanwhile, the court releases its decision on Gabriel's case. While still confounded over the court's verdict, Jean learns of Sonya's confession. Enraged, she then vows to make Sonya pay for her crime.
33	33	"Ang Paghusga"	January 10, 2018	13.1%	3.8%
Sonya voluntarily surrenders to the police after the video of her confession is widely shared. However, Domeng disagrees and tries to stop Sonya from being taken by the authorities. In desperation, Paco makes an unusual request to Atty. Vega. Meanwhile, Jean becomes devastated after learning of Sonya's betrayal. She then vows to make Sonya pay for the sufferings she caused her family.
34	34	"Ang Katatagan"	January 11, 2018	11.8%	3.6%
Jean confronts and assaults Sonya upon seeing her at the precinct. Betrayed, she then vows to make Sonya suffer for what she did to Edward. Sonya, on the other hand, begs Jean for forgiveness as she asks the latter to spare her sons from her wrath. Meanwhile, questions arise as Paco looks into Sonya's confession. With Jojo's aid, he then sets out to investigate the place where Sonya's viral video was taken.
35	35	"Papasanin"	January 12, 2018	14.8%	4.7%
Paco and Jojo investigate the property where Sonya's confession was filmed. Meanwhile, Sonya gives her account of Edward's death. During her testimony, Sonya claims that Edward pressured her to kill him. Back at the Montecillos’, Jean finds out that Anna is gone, along with her luggage and passport. Jacob, on the other hand, concocts a plan to finally tie up all loose ends.
36	36	"Ang Imbestigasyon"	January 15, 2018	13.5%	3.7%
Domeng resents Paco for letting their mother Sonya go to jail. Unknown to him, Sonya's imprisonment has also caused Paco great distress. Paco gets into a heated argument with Carolina and Gabriel, who blame him for their family's plight. Meanwhile, Jean confronts Sonya about her claim that Edward was trying to commit suicide. Later, Atty. Vega enlists someone's help with Sonya's case.
37	37	"Ipagtatanggol"	January 16, 2018	16.2%	4.7%
Domeng and Paco face the repercussions of Sonya's crime. Domeng releases his frustrations in school as he copes with Sonya's imprisonment. Paco, on the other hand, neglects his preparations for the bar exam as he deals with his problem with Domeng, his relationship with Anna, and their family business. Back in jail, Sonya deals with the rude treatment of her inmates. She then clings to hope as she aspires to be with Paco and Domeng once more.
38	38	"Gigipitin"	January 17, 2018	12.5%	4.3%
The Montecillos unleash their wrath on Sonya's family. Amid her anger, Jean learns of Anna's whereabouts from Tere. Meanwhile, Domeng faces another problem in school because of Jean's foundation. Paco, on the other hand, worries about the family business as he deals with his failing relationship with Anna. In jail, Sonya asks Asyong to help her with her case.
39	39	"Palaban"	January 18, 2018	12.4%	3.9%
Jacob and Roman scheme to drive Sonya into desperation. Not long after, an inmate attempts on Sonya's life in the middle of the night. To make matter's worse, Sonya soon finds threats involving her children, Domeng and Paco. Determined to shield them from harm, Sonya then swears to take action should something bad happens to them. Later, Jacob feigns remorse as he tries to get on Gabriel and Carolina's good graces.
40	40	"Paliwanag"	January 19, 2018	12.9%	4.0%
Paco does his best to save his and Anna's failing relationship. In the midst of Paco's desperate attempts, a special person from his past returns. Anna, on the other hand, finally makes up her mind regarding her relationship with Paco. After some time, Anna returns home. Fearing for her children's safety, Sonya looks for a way to contact Paco.
41	41	"Kumpyansa"	January 22, 2018	13.3%	3.8%
Hoping that Anna and Jean will finally leave their past behind, Jacob introduces Editha Fuentebella's daughter to them. Letty, however, informs Anna of her suspicions after seeing Jacob with the woman. Meanwhile, Paco and Georgette discuss their defense argument for Sonya's case. Paco's brother Domeng and his friends give him a boost for the bar exam. In prison, Sonya prays for Paco as he takes his exam.
42	42	"Komprontasyon"	January 23, 2018	11.4%	3.8%
The Alipios and the Montecillos prepare for Sonya's pre-trial. Before his mother's arraignment, Paco briefs Sonya with the case filed against her. Later, he celebrates his birthday in jail with Sonya and their neighbors. Meanwhile, Jacob, with Roman's help, hatches another scheme to keep Sonya from winning her case. Soon, he and Roman set out to destroy any remaining evidence that might lead to the discovery of their crimes.
43	43	"Tuloy Ang Laban"	January 24, 2018	13.3%	4.5%
During the arraignment, Jean is outraged with Sonya's not guilty plea. Knowing that Jean and her family would do everything to attain justice for Edward's death, Sonya becomes worried with her children's safety. Meanwhile, Anna visits Sonya in jail to blame the latter for her troubles. Paco, on the other hand, agrees to go out with Georgette in a nearby café. Unknown to him, however, Georgette soon comes across Anna in the same restaurant.
44	44	"Depensa"	January 25, 2018	11.9%	3.9%
Domeng sets out to learn more about the people behind Sonya's viral video. Upon seeing the sketch of the woman who forced Sonya to confess her crime, Domeng enlists Unyo and Nessa's help in his search. Meanwhile, Sonya informs Paco of Anna's visit. Guilt-ridden, she then apologizes to him for tearing his and Anna's relationship apart. Elsewhere, Jacob tasks Roman to retrieve the gun used by Sonya.
45	45	"Proteksyon"	January 26, 2018	12.4%	4.2%
Paco continues to cling to the hope that he and Anna can mend their relationship. Anna, on the other hand, becomes torn between her love for Paco and his family's involvement in her father's death. Unknown to both, Georgette still harbors feelings for Paco. Back in the prison, Sonya reveals the location of the gun to Atty. Vega, making sure to withhold Asyong's name from her testimony. Atty. Vega, however, finds a contradiction and presses Sonya to reveal the truth.
46	46	"Pagpipilian"	January 29, 2018	13.2%	3.8%
Jean urges Anna to get over Paco. Anna then resolves to face Paco and end things between them once and for all. However, Paco adamantly refuses to give up on their relationship. Trying to comfort Paco, Georgette fails to hide her feelings for him. Meanwhile, Domeng finds the woman who is behind the video of Sonya's confession.
47	47	"Sabotahe"	January 30, 2018	11.6%	3.2%
Despite being distracted by the pain caused by Anna, Paco resolves to acquit Sonya from the murder charges filed by the Montecillos. He then continues his investigation and manages to get another angle on Edward's death. Later, he and Atty. Vega's camp attempt to retrieve Edward's gun. During the retrieval, however, Paco starts to speculate that someone might be sabotaging Sonya's case. Meanwhile, Jacob assures Roman that Sonya will be convicted for killing Edward.
48	48	"Kumbinsido"	January 31, 2018	13.1%	3.4%
Anna agrees to meet with Paco after he asked her to see him. During their meetup, Paco hands Anna several documents that show new angles on Edward's death. However, Jean arrives to interrupt them. Back in the Montecillos’, Anna becomes more confused as she learns of the possibility that Sonya was not Edward's murderer. To clarify the uncertainties that surround her father's murder, Anna decides to meet with Paco again.
49	49	"Panghihimasok"	February 1, 2018	13.6%	3.8%
Jean is rushed to the hospital after she was hit by an incoming vehicle. Enraged by the tragedy, Jacob puts the blame on Anna and Paco. Meanwhile, Anna gets severely affected by her mother’s accident. She soon reaches out to Paco to find solace. However, she comes across Georgette on her way to see her former flame.
50	50	"Desisyon"	February 2, 2018	13.4%	4.0%
Jacob disposes of a critical piece of evidence that may prove Sonya’s innocence. Triumphant, he decides to celebrate his victory against Sonya. Back at the hospital, Jean asks Anna to accompany her to the United States. Torn between Jean’s welfare and her love for Paco, Anna makes a painful decision. Georgette, meanwhile, tries to get over her feelings for Paco.
51	51	"Tagumpay"	February 5, 2018	11.5%	4.0%
Still reeling from his broken heart, Paco decides to divert his attention by dredging up valuable information regarding Sonya's case. He then gets completely baffled upon noticing Georgette's cold treatment. Paco attempts to clear the air between him and Georgette and is suddenly taken aback by the latter’s shocking confessions. Meanwhile, Jacob's world turns upside down as he wakes up in an unlikely place. A person from Anna's past makes a surprising comeback.
52	52	"Topnotcher"	February 6, 2018	12.9%	4.4%
Six months after his painful breakup with Anna, Paco anxiously awaits his bar exam results. Despite his doubts, Paco manages to achieve his dream to become a licensed attorney. Anna, on the other hand, immediately reconnects with her new boyfriend, Archie, upon her return to the Philippines. However, she is unable to avoid hearing about Paco's achievement. Meanwhile, Asyong receives a court summon ordering him to testify in Sonya's case.
53	53	"Paglilitis"	February 7, 2018	13.6%	3.9%
While awaiting her trial, Sonya comes across a rumor about EduCare's downfall. Paco, meanwhile, prepares to defend his mother in court. The day of Sonya's trial soon arrives. Jean insists on attending despite her family's objections. Paco, on the other hand, vows that he will find a way to free his mother. He begins by cross-examining the only person who could have possibly witnessed the crime, a close family friend, Asyong.
54	54	"Bintang"	February 8, 2018	13.4%	3.7%
Asyong's unexpected confession sends Atty. Vega's camp into chaos. Frustrated, Atty. Vega gets into a heated confrontation with Sonya for hiding the truth. Jean, meanwhile, is content that Sonya has lost another avenue of escape. Meanwhile, back at the Montecillos, Letty discovers Katrina's compromising video recording on her cell of the night she took home a drunk Jacob to her bed. Chaos ensue when Letty tries to expose Jacob and Katrina, but Katrina manages to delete. Without proof, Jacob fires Letty. At the prison compound, Sonya resolves to figure out what Julie knows about EduCare's downfall.
55	55	"Pagpalag"	February 9, 2018	12.1%	3.7%
Following Letty's termination, Jean arrives at a decision of her own and fires Katrina. Afterward, Jacob threatens Katrina to stay away but she is quite displeased with Jacob's threatening and condescending attitude towards her. Angry, she threatens Jacob that she would expose all his illegal dealings related to the Edith Fientabela account and Educare's downfall. Jacob is disturbed. Later following the court hearing, Paco is desperate to get Sonya out of jail. He is surprised to see Letty who makes an appointment to meet with him to reveal her insights of Jacob.
56	56	"Mastermind"	February 12, 2018	13.6%	4.4%
Paco's suspicions intensify upon learning of Letty's shocking revelations regarding Jacob. Fearing for Anna's safety, Paco then tries to warn his old flame about trusting her stepfather. Anna, on the other hand, fends off Paco's allegations against Jacob. Later, a familiar person from Anna's past resurfaces. Finally, Domeng makes his true feelings for Nessa clear to her.
57	57	"Bistado"	February 13, 2018	14.9%	4.5%
The seemingly impossible task of establishing a defense for Sonya takes its toll on Paco. Unable to endure seeing Paco in low spirits, Georgette makes an effort to cheer him up. Meanwhile, Julie reaches the end of her rope after falling victim to a mean-spirited prank. She contacts Jacob and forces his hand, unaware that Sonya is keeping an eye on her actions. Seeing her chance, Sonya wastes no time in seizing it.
58	58	"Markado"	February 14, 2018	12.5%	4.0%
Certain that the voice she heard over the phone belongs to Jacob, Sonya asks Jojo for his help. Sonya later confronts Julie, refusing to leave her be until the latter agrees to speak with her. They arrange to meet in a secluded spot after everyone is asleep. Meanwhile, Jacob decides that it is finally time to tie up all loose ends. He eliminates his first target and sets his eyes on his next prey: Katrina.
59	59	"Magpanganib"	February 15, 2018	13.5%	3.9%
Leaving his henchwoman to deal with Katrina, Jacob pays Letty a visit. Upon realizing that Letty is living with the Alipios, Jacob sees this as another chance to drive a wedge between Jean and the maid. Unknown to him, Anna is making headway in uncovering the truth. Meanwhile, Sonya finds a suspicious notebook among Julie's belongings. She also starts to question the true cause of Julie's death.
60	60	"Kumpirmado"	February 16, 2018	12.9%	4.5%
Anna's purpose for visiting Letty becomes pointless after she catches herself in an awkward encounter with Paco and Georgette. Nevertheless, she still manages to inform her former boyfriend about Editha Fuentebella's fake daughter, Lisa. This prompts the young Alipio to continue looking into Jacob's alleged involvement in the murder. Paco and Georgette, meanwhile, rekindle their old flame. Elsewhere, Katrina wakes up her abductor's senses about their precarious situation under Jacob.
61	61	"Palaisipan"	February 19, 2018	13.8%	3.7%
Paco and Anna arrive at an agreement to keep their investigation on Jacob a secret. Unbeknownst to the two, Jacob is determined to eliminate the people who have knowledge about his atrocities. Meanwhile, Sonya finally reveals to Paco and Atty. Vega what she just learned the night before Julie's tragic end. Thinking that Sonya's latest discovery is not substantial evidence, the lady lawyer assigns her most-trusted confidants to verify the former's claims. Soon, the comeback of a person from the past poses a threat to Sonya's ongoing trial.
62	62	"Alinlangan"	February 20, 2018	12.2%	3.3%
Gabriel's testimony pulls Sonya's credibility into question. Fortunately, Atty. Vega remains one step ahead and has another plan up her sleeve. After a thorough investigation on Judge Tortuga's family-oriented life, Atty. Vega allows the caring mother Sonya to take the witness stand. Elsewhere, Roman approaches Katrina as an ally against Jacob. Meanwhile, Anna becomes desperate to secure evidence of Jacob's involvement in EduCare's downfall and Edward's death.
63	63	"isINAkdal"	February 21, 2018	12.4%	3.4%
Atty. Vega realizes that she needs to deviate from her usual plan of attack to win Sonya's case. After finding Judge Tortuga's soft spot, Atty. Vega allows Sonya to take the witness stand. In turn, Sonya recounts the series of events leading to her encounter with Edward on the night of his death. With Paco as her examiner, Sonya manages to narrate her story as a caring mother forced into a desperate situation to save her dying son. However, Sonya soon faces Atty. Balmaceda's cross-examination.
64	64	"Sentensiya"	February 22, 2018	12.8%	4.6%
After her emotional testimony and revelation, Sonya is left with no choice but to await the judge's verdict. On the day of Sonya's sentencing, Judge Tortuga gives both sides a chance to present a final argument. Atty. Vega and Atty. Balmaceda close their respective case by appealing to the sympathies of the court. Meanwhile, Anna uncovers a vital piece of evidence against Jacob. After sharing her discovery with Paco, Anna immediately takes action against her treacherous stepfather.
65	65	"Paglaya"	February 23, 2018	13.3%	4.4%
Sonya does not show signs of worry despite being verdicted of homicide. In contrast, a clueless Domeng fears for his mother as she remains imprisoned. Thankfully, Paco's legal expertise proved to be substantial as they are able to file petition for bail. Unbeknownst to him, however, Jacob resorts to dirty tactics to counter Paco. Regardless, Judge Tortuga's righteousness prevails. Now that Sonya's chances of freedom are stronger, her family and friends pull out all the stops to fulfill her much-deserved liberty.
66	66	"Sakripisyo"	February 26, 2018	15.2%	4.9%
As Sonya finally returns home, her family and friends throw a simple celebration for her temporary release from prison. During the party, Paco receives a surprise phone call from an anonymous person. Taking matters into his own hands, Paco decides to meet up with the mysterious informant in private. Unknown to him, Domeng has been watching his every move. Soon, a series of gruesome events befall on the Alipios.
67	67	"Sawing Palad"	February 27, 2018	15.3%	5.0%
Domeng gets shot as he tries to save his brother from Roman's killer. Panicked, Paco's heart condition flares up and he collapses. With both her sons at death's doorstep, Sonya breaks down. The Alipios’ loved ones immediately rush to the hospital to offer their support. Anna, caught between her lingering feelings for Paco and current relationship with Archie, is forced to make a choice. Meanwhile, Jacob sets his eyes on his next target.
68	68	"Determinado"	February 28, 2018	14.4%	4.2%
Domeng gets shot as he tries to save his brother from Roman's killer. Panicked, Paco's heart condition flares up and he collapses. With both her sons at death's doorstep, Sonya breaks down. The Alipios’ loved ones immediately rush to the hospital to offer their support. Anna, caught between her lingering feelings for Paco and current relationship with Archie, is forced to make a choice. Meanwhile, Jacob sets his eyes on his next target.
69	69	"Natuklasan"	March 1, 2018	16.4%	5.3%
Right after his confrontation with Sonya, Jacob finds himself on the receiving end of another assault as Anna condemns him as Edward's real killer. Forced to pick a side, Jean chooses to stick with the man who has supported her through thick and thin. However, Jean soon remembers the many suspicious happenings surrounding Jacob. Hopeful that Jacob is the good man she believes him to be, Jean tries to uncover his secrets. What she finds, however, shocks her to the core.
70	70	"Sanib Pwersa"	March 2, 2018	15.2%	4.9%
Jean meets up with Sonya after arriving at a haunting discovery. There, Jean reveals everything she found out about her wicked husband, including his plan to run away from his crimes. Having condemned Sonya before for allegedly killing Edward, Jean unexpectedly asks her a huge favor. News of Jacob's scheduled departure soon reaches Atty. Vega, who, along with her team, is working doubly-hard to get him convicted. However, a sudden change of his plan to escape forces the entire camp to race against time before it's too late.
71	71	"Walang Takas"	March 5, 2018	14.9%	4.4%
Jean pulls out all the stops to prevent Jacob from leaving the country. Her effort eventually pays off as her wicked husband goes behind bars. Amid her husband's plight, Jean continues to put on a false front by deceiving him that they are still on the same page. Meanwhile, Paco obtains crucial information from a credible witness that could lead to Jacob's lifetime imprisonment. Later, Paco and Sonya learn about Anna's noble act.
72	72	"Sabwatan"	March 6, 2018	14.2%	4.5%
As the Alipios rejoice over Jacob's imprisonment, the latter laments on Atty. Balmaceda's incapacity not to keep him behind bars. Nevertheless, the lawyer proves otherwise by resorting to dirty means to fulfill his client's demand. The move apparently sends Sonya and Jean in utmost disbelief, who are well aware that Jacob has no power to file petition for bail. Meanwhile, Nessa's suspicions pave the way to save Domeng from danger. Elsewhere, Jean gets the chance to finally get reunited with her dear Anna.
73	73	"Ambush"	March 7, 2018	13.7%	4.5%
Jacob and Insp. Asuncion plot another scheme to finally kill Domeng. As Domeng is about to be transferred to another hospital, Dindo shockingly takes over the ambulance service without anyone's knowledge. Unfortunately for the gunman, Rizalina stays alert thus, halting his assassination attempt. While all these are taking place, Sonya grows fearful after failing to get updates regarding her son's transport. Meanwhile, Atty. Vega's camp finally discovers the identity of the fake nurse who tried to kill Domeng.
74	74	"Pagbangon"	March 8, 2018	13.8%	4.6%
Jacob and Dindo clash anew after the latter failed to kill Domeng for the second time. True to Mr. Montecillo's fears, Domeng finally regains consciousness and immediately reveals the one behind the murder attempts on him and Paco. This sends his older brother fuming for revenge. While Domeng remains traumatized over what happened, Atty. Vega and Sonya prevent Paco from giving in to his rage. Elsewhere, Jean finds a way to keep an eye on her dear Anna despite their separation.
75	75	"Ebidensya"	March 9, 2018	13.1%	4.9%
In her earnest desire to save the Alipios from impending danger, Jean offers a refuge for Sonya and her sons. Though hesitant at first, Sonya deems it necessary to ensure Domeng's safety while he is still recovering. Meanwhile, Atty. Vega begins searching for evidence that might change the track of the investigation. This move then turns Jacob completely worried. Elsewhere, Anna comes full circle as she realizes that her deep-seated feelings for Paco is still lingering in her heart.
76	76	"Inosente"	March 12, 2018	15.3%	4.8%
Paco chances upon a piece of evidence that confirms Sonya's innocence. Atty. Vega then exhorts her allies to devise a plan to deliver the acquired pieces of evidence to the crime lab safely. Armed with renewed hope, Sonya resolves to ensure Domeng's safety by transferring her to Jean's house. Later, Anna catches sight of a heartbreaking scene between Paco and Georgette. This prompts Georgette to ask a tough favor from Paco's ex-girlfriend.
77	77	"Buwis-Buhay"	March 13, 2018	15.6%	4.3%
Jacob plots another wicked scheme, this time to stop Atty. Vega from transporting the evidence against him to the crime laboratory. The following day, Atty. Vega's camp departs, but not until pulling off a masterful plan that catches Jacob's gunmen off guard. Nevertheless, Dindo and SPO3 Asuncion remain adamant to get the dirty job done. However, their harmful attempts to nab the evidence are countered by a couple of tactical moves. Despite having outsmarted Jacob yet again, the trickery of Atty. Vega's camp soon comes at an ally's expense.
78	78	"Dalamhati"	March 14, 2018	15.2%	4.0%
Atty. Vega's camp finally lays Georgette unto rest. As such, the feisty lawyer commends her fallen ally for an outstanding job in the investigation. Furthermore, Anna expresses gratitude to the late attorney for her help in seeking justice for Edward. Soon, things take a turn for the better when they receive great news about Sonya. Meanwhile, Domeng is finally showing signs of improvement in his post-traumatic condition.
79	79	"Abswelto"	March 15, 2018	14.7%	4.2%
The court finds Sonya not guilty of murdering Edward Lamoste. Now that his mother is acquitted, Paco shifts his focus to attaining justice for his bereaved girlfriend, Georgette.
80	80	"Nanlaban"	March 16, 2018	13.9%	4.6%
While the Alipios celebrate the ruling, Jacob confronts them for another stern warning. The joke is on him, however, as his role in EduCare's downfall gets uncovered in public. This pushes him to go after the one who, he believes, is behind the exposé.
81	81	"Pagpapanggap"	March 19, 2018	14.2%	TBA
Paco falls into police hands upon accidentally ending Dindo's life. With Paco's back against the wall, a trusted ally comes to his aid. Jean, on the other hand, goes to great lengths to earn Jacob's trust. Later, her efforts pay off when Jacob lays some of his cards on the table. Meanwhile, a witness offers to testify against Jacob.
82	82	"Pagkukunwari"	March 20, 2018	13.8%	TBA
Jean remains committed to play mind games with Jacob despite his confession on the embezzlements within EduCare. However, she reaches her boiling point upon learning about his hideous plan against Anna. Anna, on the other hand, learns that someone has been protecting her without her knowledge. Meanwhile, Domeng insists on testifying against Jacob. Unfortunately, his post-traumatic condition hinders his request.
83	83	"Pagdududa"	March 21, 2018	N/A	TBA
Staying true to his word, Jacob sets up a ploy in order to test Jean's loyalty to him. However, Mrs. Montecillo decides to play along thus, suppressing his skepticism of her. Despite this, Jacob remains adamant to make his wife pay the moment she betrays him. Meanwhile, Letty arrives at a shocking revelation about Jean. This leaves Sonya with no other choice but to spill everything to Letty.
84	84	"Planado"	March 22, 2018	N/A	TBA
Just for the sake of toppling Jacob, Sonya finally agrees to join forces with his former henchwomen, Katrina and Marjorie. As such, Jean immediately relays to the two to carry out her plan of spying on her husband's actions. However, they only have limited time to get the dirty job done. Domeng, meanwhile, recounts the moments leading to Jacob's attempt to murder him before the fiscal. Unbeknownst to him, a looming danger awaits him and his family once again.
85	85	"Salisi"	March 23, 2018	14.2%	4.6%
Perplexed by his latest discovery, Jacob rushes to his house as he believes that someone has managed to sneak in. Jean, on the other hand, finds a way to distract her husband from searching. Because of this, Katrina, Letty, and Marjorie get some time to leave the Montecillo's home. Meanwhile, through the help of Jojo and Rizalina, the Alipios surpass another challenge caused by SPO3 Asuncion and his men. Elsewhere, Anna becomes emotional upon learning that Paco is longing for Georgette.

=== Book 2 ===
No. overall	No. in season	Title	Original release date	Kantar Media Ratings (Nationwide)	AGB Nielsen Ratings (NUTAM People)
86	1	"Panganib"	March 26, 2018	13.0%	4.8%
Jacob scolds SPO3 Asuncion for his failed mission. The wicked police then comes up with a brilliant idea to locate Domeng. Rizalina, on the other hand, presses Suarez to admit the identity of the mastermind behind the abduction attempt on Domeng. Later, Jojo and Rizalina's suspicion intensifies upon seeing the facial expression of SPO3 Asuncion's henchman. Meanwhile, Jean continues to manipulate Jacob.
87	2	"Strategy"	March 27, 2018	13.3%	5.2%
Jacob resolves to abscond from his cases once again, putting Jean in an even more difficult situation. Unfortunately for him, Katrina and Marjorie learn about his wicked plan. Soon, they inform Sonya about it, who fears that Jean might not be able to free herself from her husband's hands. Adding to Sonya's worries, Insp. Asuncion vehemently forbids Jojo and Rizalina from helping her cause. Meanwhile, Atty. Vega's camp receives new information regarding Jacob's embezzlement case.
88	3	"Pagtakas"	March 28, 2018	13.6%	TBA
Atty. Vega starts off with a plan of her own to stop Jacob from running away from his crimes. The entire camp, however, remains puzzled as to who tipped them regarding his plan to escape. Eventually, a series of developments points to Jacob as the mastermind behind the information the feisty lawyer received. The entire camp then concludes that their enemy is using his wicked ways to their disadvantage. Jojo and Rizalina, meanwhile, storm to Batangas to prevent Jacob from escaping. Upon arriving at the port, the police officers are stunned with what they find.
89	4	"Dakilang Ina"	April 2, 2018	14.4%	TBA
After learning where she and Jacob are heading to, Jean tries to contact Sonya to inform her of their destination. Jacob, however, finds a way to cut off his and Jean's communication with everyone. Meanwhile, Anna and Paco get help from Atty. Vega in pursuing Jacob. Anna later breathes a sigh of relief as she and Paco accidentally locate Jean and Jacob. Soon, Paco and Anna are shocked upon discovering something about their mothers.
90	5	"Pag-asa Sakripisyo"	April 3, 2018	15.4%	TBA
The police enact an entrapment operation against Jacob before the latter could flee the country with Jean. Worried about her mother, Anna waits with bated breath as the police prepare to attack. Despite Atty. Vega's careful planning, Jacob notices something off as he and Jean arrive at the port. Upon confirming his suspicion, Jacob engages in a shootout with the authorities. In the heat of the commotion, an innocent life is put in jeopardy.
91	6	"Peligro"	April 4, 2018	15.3%	TBA
Jacob successfully evades the authorities and finds shelter in an old, blind man’s house. Knowing that he has nowhere to go, Jacob seeks help from his uncle, who then informs him of his parents' departure. Meanwhile, Anna and Letty are relieved to find improvement in Jean’s condition. Back in the Alipios’, the family's peaceful night is ruined by a new threat. Elsewhere, Katrina's and Marjorie's lives are put in grave danger.
92	7	"Pamamaalam"	April 5, 2018	14.3%	TBA
Despite being a wanted man, Jacob continues to affect the lives of his enemies. He then wastes no time in finding a way to get rid of Katrina and Marjorie. Amid this, Jacob becomes deeply concerned with Jean especially after learning that she is in a critical condition.
93	8	"Paghahanap"	April 6, 2018	13.1%	TBA
Meanwhile, Sonya grows worried after seeing the extent of Jacob's wickedness. Despite Jacob's underhanded actions, Paco and Atty. Vega remains firm in their quest to take him down in a legal manner.
94	9	"Pursigido"	April 9, 2018	15.2%	TBA
Anna and the Alipios are filled with delight as they bond with someone close to their hearts. They then feel a sense of relief after confirming that Jacob has been arrested. Now that their search for justice is slowly coming to an end, Paco continues to work hard in order to bring Jacob to justice. His investigation soon leads him to a credible witness against the defendant. Elsewhere, Atty. Balmaceda fails to convince Jacob to heed his advice, leading him to sever his ties with his client.
95	10	"Walang Pagsisisi"	April 10, 2018	14.8%	TBA
Sonya ’s camp succeeds in persuading Gabriel to testify against Jacob. However, Jacob denies Gabriel's allegations during the trial. To ensure Jacob's incarceration, Letty resolves to take the witness stand. Meanwhile, Anna confronts Jacob for all his atrocities against her family. Elsewhere, Atty. Vega remains confident of their victory over Jacob.
96	11	"Husgado"	April 11, 2018	13.2%	TBA
Anna's camp presents various witnesses against Jacob during his trial. The witnesses give accounts of Jacob's crimes to further incriminate him. Jacob, on the other hand, prepares a few tricks up his sleeves. To acquit himself, Jacob narrates his relationship with Edward before the latter's unexpected death. Upon hearing Jacob's defense, Jean suddenly finds herself confused about her husband's death.
97	12	"Detalyado"	April 12, 2018	13.3%	TBA
Jacob consistently insists his innocence in Edward's death. To prove his claims, Jacob uses Edward's suicidal tendencies as a counter argument. Seeing the possibility that Jacob may win the case, Paco analyzes the details of Jean and Jacob's conversation during the night of Edward's death.
98	13	"Testigo"	April 13, 2018	13.5%	TBA
He then unearths some vital information, which proves ultimately useful during the trial. Back in jail, Miguel implores Jacob to admit his crimes for the sake of his sick mother.
99	14	"Rebelasyon"	April 16, 2018	13.0%	4.6%
To make up for his shortcomings to Edward and his family, Miguel testifies against his son Jacob in court. He later unveils evidence which ultimately leads the culprit behind Edward's murder. Soon, Miguel is caught off guard by a shocking discovery. Meanwhile, Jacob is disappointed with the progress of his case and vows to get back at Anna's camp. Elsewhere, a foreboding feeling washes over Paco and Anna.
100	15	"Kabayaran"	April 17, 2018	13.7%	4.2%
Paco and his colleagues investigate the mysterious man that infiltrated their firm's building. Thinking that the man is after Miguel, they immediately find ways to protect their newest witness. Meanwhile, Jacob orchestrates another set of attacks against Anna's camp. As Anna and the Alipios find themselves in grave danger, Jacob secretly delights over their misery. However, his strong desire to get rid of his enemies eventually costs him something he did not expect.
101	16	"Hatol"	April 18, 2018	12.5%	4.5%
Jacob learns of Miguel's unfortunate death. Luckily, he is able to visit his father's wake, unaware that Anna and Jean are also there. Soon, the court hands down its verdict on Jacob. After the verdict, Jacob makes an emotional plea to Paco, much to everyone's surprise. Elsewhere, Jean comes to a realization.
102	17	"Warning"	April 19, 2018	12.4%	4.8%
Jacob finally learns that Jean is still alive. Feeling betrayed, he vows to enact vengeance against her and the Alipios. Heeding Jacob's threat, Jean and Sonya resolve to move far away to keep their children safe. Meanwhile, Paco vacates his position at Atty. Vega's law firm. He then meets with Anna for an important talk.
103	18	"Takas"	April 20, 2018	12.5%	4.8%
Sonya's and Jean's families each prepare for their move-outs. The Alipios spend their remaining days in Manila with their friends and loved ones. Jean and Anna, on the other hand, host an intimate dinner before they move to the US. However, the celebration is halted when Anna suddenly fails to contact Jean. Elsewhere, Jacob gets ganged up on in prison.
104	19	"Pagdukot"	April 23, 2018	11.2%	4.4%
Anna and the Alipios set out to look for Jean, suspecting that Jacob is behind her disappearance. While Anna and Paco investigate Jean's last known location, Sonya and Atty. Vega confront Jacob in prison. Jacob, however, adamantly denies being involved in Jean's disappearance. Soon, Sonya realizes Jacob's true intentions. She immediately warns Paco but finds herself and Atty. Vega in danger.
105	20	"Magkapatid"	April 24, 2018	12.8%	5.0%
Sonya finds out that Jacob holds her captive. To inflict more pain on Sonya, Jacob reveals his vile plans against Paco and Domeng. Upon learning of Sonya's plight, Paco and Domeng take it upon themselves to rescue their mother. Wasting no time, the two brothers set out to face Jacob. Elsewhere, Anna, Jojo, and Rizalina speculate David's involvement in Sonya's and Jean's abductions.
106	21	"Pinagpilian"	April 25, 2018	12.9%	4.7%
In their eagerness to save their mother, Paco and Domeng face Jacob on their own. The two brothers soon find themselves in an insurmountable ordeal as they fall into Jacob's trap. With the Alipios finally ending up at his mercy, Jacob lays out his ultimate test for Sonya. Meanwhile, the police corner David. Anna then urges David to reveal where Jacob is hiding Sonya and Jean.
107	22	"Huling Laro"	April 26, 2018	13.6%	5.0%
Jojo and the NBI race against time to save the Alipios. Meanwhile, Sonya, Paco, and Domeng finally get the chance to flee from Jacob. However, Jacob bars their escape and leaves Paco to make a decision that will shatter his family either way. With his family's safety on the line, how far will Paco go to save them? Elsewhere, Anna rescues Jean.
108	23	"Ang Hangganan"	April 27, 2018	14.8%	5.3%
The tragic face-off between Jacob and the Alipios finally comes to an end. Right before his very eyes, Domeng witnesses how Sonya and Paco struggle for their lives. He then stands up and shares all the pain and hardships his family went through to the public. Five years after, Domeng graduates and lands a decent job. Meanwhile, Anna and Jean occupy themselves with their respective causes.
