= List of Reputasyon episodes =

Reputasyon (lit. Reputation) is a Philippine romance drama previously aired by ABS-CBN. It stars Cristine Reyes together with Rayver Cruz and Jason Abalos. It also stars the daytime television comeback of Aiko Melendez and Jaclyn Jose. It originally aired on the 2:00 – 2:45 p.m. timeslot, until September 19, 2011 when it was moved to the 5:00 – 5:45 p.m. timeslot as requested by the televiewers. The show was aired from July 11, 2011 to January 20, 2012.

== List of episodes ==
No. overall	Title	Original Air Date	Kantar Media Rating (Nationwide)
1	"Episode 1"	2010/01/10	10.1%
2	"Episode 2"	2010/01/11	10.6%
3	"Episode 3"	2010/01/12	9.2%
4	"Episode 4"	2010/01/13	9.6%
5	"Episode 5"	2010/01/14	10.4%
6	"Episode 6"	2010/01/15	10.7%
7	"Episode 7"	2010/01/16	10.2%
8	"Episode 8"	2010/01/17	12.7%
9	"Episode 9"	2010/01/18	10.8%
10	"Episode 10"	2010/01/19	10.9%
11	"Episode 11"	2010/01/20	10.9%
12	"Episode 12"	2010/01/21	13.1%
13	"Episode 13"	2010/01/22	12.9%
14	"Episode 14"	2010/01/23	12.9%
15	"Episode 15"	2010/01/24	9.3%
16	"Episode 16"	2010/01/25	12.6%
17	"Episode 17"	2010/01/26	12.1%
18	"Episode 18"	2010/01/27	11.5%
19	"Episode 19"	2010/01/28	11.9%
20	"Episode 20"	2010/01/29	12.0%
21	"Episode 21"	2010/01/30	11.6%
22	"Episode 22"	2010/01/31	11.2%
23	"Episode 23"	2010/02/01	12.5%
24	"Episode 24"	2010/02/02	12.1%
25	"Episode 25"	2010/02/03	13.1%
26	"Episode 26"	2010/02/04	11.0%
27	"Episode 27"	2010/02/05	TBA
28	"Episode 28"	2010/02/06	11.6%
29	"Episode 29"	2010/02/07	11.9%
30	"Episode 30"	2010/02/08	TBA
31	"Episode 31"	2010/02/09	12.0%
32	"Episode 32"	2010/02/10	10.3%
33	"Episode 33"	2010/02/11	10.2%
34	"Episode 34"	2010/02/12	11.0%
35	"Episode 35"	2010/02/13	10.5%
36	"Episode 36"	2010/02/14	12.4%
37	"Episode 37"	2010/02/15	11.6%
38	"Episode 38"	2010/02/16	11.5%
39	"Episode 39"	2010/02/17	11.8%
40	"Episode 40"	2010/02/18	10.9%
41	"Episode 41"	2010/02/19	11.8%
42	"Episode 42"	2010/02/20	11.8%
43	"Episode 43"	2010/02/21	12.7%
44	"Episode 44"	2010/02/22	12.3%
45	"Episode 45"	2010/02/23	TBA
46	"Episode 46"	2010/02/24	TBA
47	"Episode 47"	2010/02/25	12.3%
48	"Episode 48"	2010/02/26	10%
49	"Episode 49"	2010/02/27	10.5%
50	"Episode 50"	2010/02/28	12.1%
51	"Episode 51"	2010/03/01	14.7%
52	"Episode 52"	2010/03/02	15.1%
53	"Episode 53"	2010/03/03	14.4%
54	"Episode 54"	2010/03/04	13.6%
55	"Episode 55"	2010/03/05	13.0%
56	"Episode 56"	2010/03/06	16.4%
57	"Episode 57"	2010/03/07	14.0%
58	"Episode 58"	2010/03/08	12.9%
59	"Episode 59"	2010/03/09	12.3%
60	"Episode 60"	2010/03/10	14.0%
61	"Episode 61"	2019/03/11	16.6%
62	"Episode 62"	2010/03/12	TBA
63	"Episode 63"	2010/03/13	TBA
64	"Episode 64"	2010/03/14	TBA
65	"Episode 65"	2010/03/15	15.2%
66	"Episode 66"	2010/03/16	13.1%
67	"Episode 67"	2010/03/17	15.7%
68	"Episode 68"	2010/03/18	14.9%
69	"Episode 69"	2010/03/19	14.0%
70	"Episode 70"	2010/03/20	12.4%
71	"Episode 71"	2010/03/21	12.3%
72	"Episode 72"	2010/03/22	12.7%
73	"Episode 73"	2010/03/23	11.2%
74	"Episode 74"	2010/03/24	12.6%
75	"Episode 75"	2010/03/25	12.7%
76	"Episode 76"	2010/03/26	13.1%
77	"Episode 77"	2010/03/27	12.1%
78	"Episode 78"	2010/03/28	10.6%
79	"Episode 79"	2010/03/29	12.8%
80	"Episode 80"	2010/03/30	12.0%
81	"Episode 81"	2010/03/31	13.3%
82	"Episode 82"	2010/04/01	11.3%
83	"Episode 83"	2010/04/02	14.5%
84	"Episode 84"	2010/04/03	14.5%
85	"Episode 85"	2010/04/04	TBA
86	"Episode 86"	2010/04/05	TBA
87	"Episode 87"	2010/04/06	TBA
88	"Episode 88"	2010/04/07	12.3%
89	"Episode 89"	2010/04/08	13.0%
90	"Episode 90"	2010/04/09	13.5%
91	"Episode 91"	2010/04/10	14.4%
92	"Episode 92"	2010/04/11	14.4%
93	"Episode 93"	2010/04/12	13.4%
94	"Episode 94"	2010/04/13	13.4%
95	"Episode 95"	2010/04/14	13.3%
96	"Episode 96"	2010/04/15	13.5%
97	"Episode 97"	2010/04/16	13.9%
98	"Episode 98"	2010/04/17	11.7%
99	"Episode 99"	2010/04/18	TBA
100	"Episode 100"	2010/04/19	12.9%
101	"Episode 101"	2010/04/20	TBA
102	"Episode 102"	2010/04/21	12.4%
103	"Episode 103"	2010/04/22	12.1%
104	"Episode 104"	2010/04/23	14.9%
105	"Episode 105"	2010/04/24	13.1%
106	"Episode 106"	2010/04/25	14.5%
107	"Episode 107"	2010/04/26	TBA
108	"Episode 108"	2010/04/27	TBA
109	"Episode 109"	2010/04/28	TBA
110	"Episode 110"	2010/04/29	TBA
111	"Episode 111"	2010/04/30	13.8%
112	"Episode 112"	2010/05/01	14.3%
113	"Episode 113"	2010/05/02	15.5%
114	"Episode 114"	2010/05/03	TBA
115	"Episode 115"	2010/05/04	15.0%
116	"Episode 116"	2010/05/05	TBA
117	"Episode 117"	2010/05/06	TBA
118	"Episode 118"	2010/05/07	TBA
119	"Episode 119"	2010/05/08	TBA
120	"Episode 120"	2010/05/09	TBA
121	"Episode 121"	2010/05/10	13.5%
122	"Episode 122"	2010/05/11	12.8%
123	"Episode 123"	2010/05/12	11.1%
124	"Episode 124"	2010/05/13	11.4%
125	"Episode 125"	2010/05/14	9.7%
126	"Episode 126"	2010/05/15	10.4%
127	"Episode 127"	2010/05/16	12.0%
128	"Episode 128"	2010/05/17	12.2%
129	"Episode 129"	2010/05/18	10.5%
130	"Episode 130"	2010/05/19	11.9%
131	"Episode 131"	2010/05/20	13.9%
132	"Episode 132"	2010/05/21	13.1%
133	"Episode 133"	2010/05/22	13.8%
134	"Episode 134"	2010/05/23	12.0%
135	"Episode 135"	2010/05/24	13.1%
136	"Episode 136"	2010/05/25	11.1%
137	"Episode 137"	2010/05/26	TBA
138	"Episode 138"	2010/05/27	TBA
139	"Episode 139"	2010/05/28	TBA
140	"Episode 140"	2010/05/29	11.7%
