= We Will Survive =

2016 Philippine television drama series

- Title card
- Genre: Comedy drama
- Created by: ABS-CBN Studios; Mel Mendoza-del Rosario
- Developed by: ABS-CBN Studios; Monteagudo-Ocampo
- Written by: Mary Rose Colindres; Nikki Bunquin; Jimuel de la Cruz; Jaymar Castro; Jaja Amarillo; Zoilo Barrel; Mary Lhuvirizz Martin
- Directed by: Jeffrey R. Jeturian; Mervyn B. Brondial
- Starring: Pokwang; Melai Cantiveros
- Opening theme: "I Will Survive" by Jona
- Composers: Freddie Perren; Dino Fekaris
- Country of origin: Philippines
- Original language: Filipino
- No. of episodes: 97 (list of episodes)

Production
- Executive producers: Carlo Katigbak; Cory Vidanes; Laurenti Dyogi; Ginny Monteagudo-Ocampo
- Producers: Aimee Fabian-Sumalde; Mel Mendoza-del Rosario
- Production locations: Legazpi, Albay, Philippines; Metro Manila, Philippines
- Editor: Dennis A. Salgado
- Running time: 30-45 minutes
- Production company: GMO Unit

Original release
- Network: ABS-CBN
- Release: February 29 – July 15, 2016

We Will Survive is a 2016 Philippine television drama comedy series broadcast by ABS-CBN. Directed by Jeffrey R. Jeturian and Mervyn B. Brondial, it stars Pokwang and Melai Cantiveros. It aired on the network's Primetime Bida line up and worldwide on TFC from February 29 to July 15, 2016, replacing Pasión de Amor. Starting April 18, 2016, it was demoted to ABS-CBN's Kapamilya Gold afternoon block to give way for My Super D.

== Premise ==
Two probinsiyanas and childhood friends, Wilma; a sure-footed family woman and Maricel; a risk-taking dreamer, both experienced heartaches that sealed their friendship—but after these heartaches, they both had a resolve that they will survive.

Wilma decides to go to Manila to forget her heartache, and find growth in terms of her career—for herself, and her family. Maricel on the other hand, decides to stay in Albay to focus on her dream and become a Hotel General Manager. With Wilma's temporary absence in Maricel's life, Maricel meets a man who will help her recover from her heartache and she immediately falls in love with this man.

Both Wilma and Maricel are seemingly recovering from their past heartaches, until one day, their lives are both shaken by one ultimate test of their friendship.

Will Wilma and Maricel survive?

== Cast and characters ==
=== Main cast ===
- Pokwang as Wilmalyn "Wilma" Bonanza-San Juan
- Melai Cantiveros as Maria Cecilia "Maricel" Rubio-Rustia

=== Supporting cast ===
- Carlo Aquino as Pocholo Rustia
- Jeric Raval as Edwin San Juan
- John Steven de Guzman as Jude Rubio
- Bea Saw as Ana Fe Adlao
- Regine Angeles as Sheila
- Maris Racal as Jenny Bonanza-Ataiza
- McCoy de Leon as Ralph Ataiza
- Vangie Labalan as Maria Judith "Judy" Rubio
- Bing Davao as Nestor Bonanza
- Ahron Villena as Rodel Bernardo

=== Recurring cast ===
- Joshua Zamora as Edwin Villalobos
- Alchris Galura as Arnold Bonanza
- Genevieve Reyes as Sarah Bonanza
- Franco Rodriguez as Jesus "Jess" Espiritu
- Jana Agoncillo as Anya San Juan
- Marissa Delgado as Luz San Juan

=== Guest cast ===
- Desiree del Valle as Jessica
- Jose Sarasola as Toffer
- Kristel Fulgar as Cyrille
- Kate Alejandrino as Michelle
- Alyssa Kangleon as Jamie
- Via Antonio as Gail
- Levi Ignacio as Roy
- Epifania "Direk Panying" Limon as Mags
- Jong Cuenco as Mr. Rustia
- Jhade Soberano as June

== Ratings ==
KANTAR MEDIA NATIONAL TV RATINGS
| PILOT EPISODE | FINALE EPISODE | PEAK | SOURCE |
|---|---|---|---|
| 16.7% (5:45pm) | 14.5% (5:00pm) | 16.5% (5:45pm) | |

== Timeslot ==
We Will Survive originally aired at 5:45 PM as part of the network's Primetime Bida evening block.

On April 18, 2016, the drama was later moved to Kapamilya Gold afternoon block in a new timeslot at 5:00 PM (timeslot may vary in some areas nationwide).

== Reruns ==
The show began airing re-runs on Jeepney TV from March 20 to August 4, 2023; January 13 to May 23, 2025 and June 29 to September 4, 2026.

== See also ==
- List of programs broadcast by ABS-CBN
- List of ABS-CBN Studios original drama series
- List of programs broadcast by Jeepney TV
