= Mundo Man Ay Magunaw =

2012 Filipino romantic drama television series

- Title card
- Genre: Family drama; Romance
- Created by: ABS-CBN Studios; Mel Mendoza-Del Rosario
- Based on: Mundo Man ay Magunaw by Salvador Royales
- Written by: Denise O'Hara; Nikki Bunquin; Jaymar Castro; Alpha Fortun
- Directed by: Jeffrey R. Jeturian; Rechie A. del Carmen
- Starring: Eula Valdez; Empress Schuck; Nikki Gil; Ejay Falcon; Sylvia Sanchez; Emilio Garcia; Allan Paule; Pinky Amador; Alex Castro; Dianne Medina; Tessie Tomas
- Opening theme: "Hulog ng Langit" by Aiza Seguerra / Angeline Quinto
- Composer: Vehnee Saturno
- Country of origin: Philippines
- Original language: Filipino
- No. of episodes: 115

Production
- Executive producers: Carlo Katigbak; Cory Vidanes; Laurenti Dyogi; Ginny Monteagudo-Ocampo
- Producers: Narciso Y. Gulmatico, Jr.; Grace Ann Bodegon-Casimsiman; Ellen Nicolas-Criste; Mel Mendoza-Del Rosario
- Production location: Metro Manila
- Cinematography: Hermann Clavarall; Neil Daza; Jafet Tutane
- Editors: Shyra Marie Joaquin; Billy Joe Karganilla; Maydelle Marcial; Ding Mora
- Running time: 28–30 minutes Weekdays at 14:45 (PST)
- Production company: GMO Entertainment Unit

Original release
- Network: ABS-CBN
- Release: January 30 – July 13, 2012

Related
- Mundo Man ay Magunaw (1990 film)

Mundo Man ay Magunaw (International title: Even If the World Ends) is a 2012 Philippine television drama romantic series broadcast by ABS-CBN. The series is based on the 1990 Philippine film of the same title. Directed by Jeffrey R. Jeturian and Rechie A. del Carmen, it stars Eula Valdez, Empress Schuck, Ejay Falcon, Nikki Gil, Sylvia Sanchez, Emilio Garcia, Allan Paule, Pinky Amador, Alex Castro, Dianne Medina and Tessie Tomas. It aired on the network's Kapamilya Gold line up and worldwide on TFC from January 30 to July 13, 2012, replacing Heartstrings and was replaced by Angelito: Ang Bagong Yugto.

The series was streaming online on YouTube.

== Production ==
After the success of the afternoon dramas Natutulog Ba ang Diyos? and Magkano ang Iyong Dangal?, ABS-CBN decided the next "sineserye" would be Mundo Man ay Magunaw. It served as Eula Valdez's comeback to portraying dramatic roles. She recently played the main antagonist Selina Pereira-Matias†, an iconic role first played by Filipina actress, Princess Punzalan. Eula's hit role in the remake Mula sa Puso got her praise because she last played villainous protagonist in 2000's Pangako Sa 'Yo as the iconic Amor Powers. Valdez's second protagonist in her comeback primetime drama series Darating ang Umaga as Almira "Mira" Banal-Cordero alongside Vina Morales. Her last protagonist role was in the remake of Maria Flordeluna, where she played Jo Esperitu, immortalized by Laurice Guillen in the original Flor de Luna. ABS-CBN wanted her to play Olivia La Pena, a role which was played by popular veteran actress Susan Roces. She accepted the role in a conference in October 2011, and filming began in December 2011.

The next roles were given to Empress who would play Sheryl San Juan (originally portrayed by Sheryl Cruz) and Jennifer "Jenny" La Pena would go to Nikki Gil, (originally portrayed by character actress Jennifer Sevilla). Ejay Falcon was cast as Nico (originally portrayed by Romnick Sarmenta), who then would work again with Empress after they starred in Guns and Roses. Freelance actress Sylvia Sanchez left GMA Network to go back to her home network to play Lani San Juan (originally portrayed by Nida Blanca). In this latest version, Lani is a villain. The role of Donya Alicia La Peña is played by comedian and veteran actress Tessie Tomas (originally immortalized by Alicia Vergel). The role of Dante, Olivia's love interest, was given to Emilio Garcia (originally immortalized by Dante Rivero).

=== Synopsis ===
Mundo Man ay Magunaw is an afternoon drama that tells the story of three women whose lives intertwine in the twist of fate. After 20 years of imprisonment, Olivia La Pena is ready to start a new life again and rebuild the family she never had. The story also follows the lives of her estranged daughters Sheryl and Jennifer who will learn that to understand the other they must learn how to love one another at all costs to save each other.

=== Plot ===
20 years ago, Olivia San Juan (Jodi Sta. Maria/Eula Valdez) fell in love with her longtime suitor Carlos La Pena (Christopher Roxas). They marry. At the same time she is in the middle of a relationship with Dante (James Blanco/Emilio Garcia) who then marries Lailani "Lani" (Katya Santos/Sylvia Sanchez), Olivia's sister. Olivia grows in burden after killing her husband to save her younger daughter who then is taken by Carlos' mother Alicia La Pena (Tessie Tomas) who then grows hatred for her own daughter-in-law without her knowledge of the real reasons on Carlos' death and Olivia's intentions. Olivia has another baby girl named Bianca (also known as Sheryl, which is a real La Peña) but the girl was given away to Lani, without Olivia's knowledge. Alicia has taken her daughter Jenny to the States after Olivia's mother's death and, finding out her younger daughter Bianca is assumed dead, the latter is set on a not so unkind reunion.

After 20 years, Olivia is out of prison and is set to live a new life. Her daughter Jennifer (Nikki Gil) has grown into an intelligent, beautiful, young woman who is taught to become successful in life with the help of her overbearing grandmother Donya Alicia whose shadow she lives under. Jennifer grows hatred for her biological mother Olivia who tries her best to reconnect with her. In her thought that this idea is just a way to ruin the relationship between her grandmother and to ruin her family and start troubles in order to gain her trust, Jennifer crosses paths with Sheryl San Juan (Empress Schuck) a poor lass who tries to bind her family back together in search of hopes that she will one day find her father again after leaving her family to work abroad. Sheryl gains faith with her childhood friend Niko (Ejay Falcon) who then courts her and becomes her boyfriend. On the other hand, Jennifer struggles with an upcoming marriage with Mike Sarmiento (Alex Castro) to save the family business from falling apart while in a private relationship with Jenny's cousin Ramona (Dianne Medina).

In Olivia's search for a better life, she accepts employment with a lonely bar and restaurant owner Emilio (Allan Paule) who tries to regain her ability to love again. The story further focuses on the difficult relationships that tear the families apart when Dante comes back into Olivia and Lani's lives after he's released from a crime and freak accident that has scarred him for life. The story ladders on the relationship Olivia must face between her daughter Jennifer and her true identity and the conflicting relationship between her and Lani over Dante's love for her and her obsessive sister. The ladder is caught up with Donya Alicia's never-ending quest to destroy Olivia's life. The plot worsens when the family's relationships start to tear apart with the revenge, greed, and the corruption consuming the lives of Alicia and Lani; Olivia trying to find peace with her daughter Jennifer; and Sheryl trying to save her love life for Nico and her friendship with Jennifer and trying to make peace between her parents.

In the end, will the obstacles and clues lead to reveal the truth of their true identities? Will the family one day be together against all odds?

== Cast and characters ==
=== Main cast ===
Lead cast

- Eula Valdez as Olivia "Olive" San Juan-La Peña: The real mother of Sheryl and Jenny and a main protagonist. She was in prison because she accidentally killed her husband Carlos La Pena. After a series of events, she is out of imprisonment after 20 years and tries to rebuild a new life and a family she has never had. She will face the trials of her mother-in-law and the changes between her daughter Jenny and will find a new love in Emilio. Will she be ready to face the next few challenges and changes in her life?
- Empress Schuck as Bianca La Peña/Sheryl San Juan: The younger half-sister of Jennifer and the legitimate daughter of Olivia and Carlos (she's Donya Alicia's biological granddaughter), she will live under the lies and the pains of her life will intertwine with Olivia and Jennifer who are her real family. She will do anything to save the ones she loves and even the ones she has grown to learn and love the most she has been a dutiful daughter to Lani and dreams of keeping her life intact but with her discovering her true identity will she also get the chance to love and be loved?
- Nikki Gil as Jennifer "Jen" La Peña: The real and eldest illegitimate daughter of Carlos, but the real daughter of Dante to Olivia who will live under a lie and will try her best to keep her mother out of her life. She tries to be a perfectionist and tries at all odds to save her family business. She tries to find her true identity and to keep her trust for her grandmother. She finds herself loveless and assumes a newfound happiness with Sheryl and Niko who will regain her spirit and learn meaningful lessons. Will she learn how to follow her heart even if it hurts the ones around her or live in burden with the choices given to her under the shadow of her grandmother?

Supporting cast

- Tessie Tomas as Donya Alicia La Peña: She is the main antagonist and Olivia's mother-in-law. She took care of Jenny (actually, she's not her biological granddaughter) as a way to get rid of the pain in her heart after the death of her only son Carlos. Her anger for Olivia intensifies as she tries her best to get rid of Olivia. She has always influenced her granddaughter and those around her but tries to save her company from bankruptcy. She tries to solve her problems with prayer but has no idea how to solve her personal problems, especially emotionally and financially. Also, she's the biological grandmother of Sheryl (the real La Peña) and was finally reconciled to Jenny. She was pushed and killed by Lani into the bed and hit her head during their confrontation at night.
- Ejay Falcon as Dominiko "Niko" Poblador: Sheryl's childhood friend and suitor. He will be the main object of affection to Sheryl and Jenny; his love will be tested with trust.
- Sylvia Sanchez as Leilani "Lani" San Juan: Olivia's sister and the one bound to save her relationship with Dante and Sheryl. She uses alcohol to keep the pain of her past from battling her emotions; she will try her hardest to have the family she has never had even if it takes getting rid of Olivia; she will learn from a support group to help her with her struggles. She's the adoptive mother/biological aunt of Sheryl and also the non-biological mother of Jenny until the end of the episode, Lani was sentenced to prison after she pushed Donya Alicia into the bed and killed (even Olivia is the second murder case, the first is killing Carlos by stabbing with the scissor) and she gets hostage with her daughter.
- Emilio Garcia as Dante Santos: The real man behind all Olivia and Lani's troubles and the biological father of Jennifer.
- Allan Paule as Emilio: Olivia's boss and Olivia's love interest who will teach Olivia to love and trust again and save her from harm. In a full trailer, he is supposed to be played by Dante Santos.
- Alex Castro as Michael "Mike" Sarmiento: In a planned marriage with Jenny and Ramona's lover.
- Jayson Gainza as Fortunato "Atoy" Poblador: Father of Niko and family friend of the San Juans.
- Pinky Amador as Matilda La Peña: The mother of Ramona and the main conflict between Alicia and the La Pena family.
- Dianne Medina as Ramona La Peña: The daughter of Matilda and Jennifer's cousin (actually, Sheryl's cousin) who is in a relationship with Mike which leads to abuse.

=== Recurring cast ===
- Franco Daza as Edward Fuentebella
- Jong Cuenco as Paul Sarmiento
- Gilleth Sandico as Nenita Sarmiento
- Shey Bustamante as Beatrice Miranda
- Hiyasmin Neri as Diana Valera
- Princess Manzon as Alex
- April Sun as Casey
- Rosario "Tart" Carlos as Christy
- Joma Labayen as Joma

=== Special participation ===
- Jodi Sta. Maria as Young Olivia
- James Blanco as Young Dante
- Katya Santos as Young Lani
- John Manalo as Young Niko
- Brenna Peñaflor as Young Sheryl
- Kimberly Fulgar as Young Jenny
- Christopher Roxas as Carlos La Peña
- Tanya Gomez as Monalisa San Juan
- Levi Ignacio as Police Inspector

== Theme song ==
- "Hulog ng Langit" - Donna Cruz (released 1999) (covered by Aiza Seguerra and Angeline Quinto for the teleserye, then a duet version in 2010 by Frencheska Farr and Geoff Taylor for GMA Network's Langit sa Piling Mo)

== Reruns ==
The show began first airing rerun on Jeepney TV from May 19 to August 8, 2025 replacing the rerun of Bukas na Lang Kita Mamahalin and was replaced by the rerun of Reputasyon.

== See also ==
- List of programs broadcast by ABS-CBN
- List of ABS-CBN Studios original drama series
- List of programs broadcast by Jeepney TV
