= Old Burying Ground (Brookline, Massachusetts) =

Historic cemetery in Norfolk County, Massachusetts

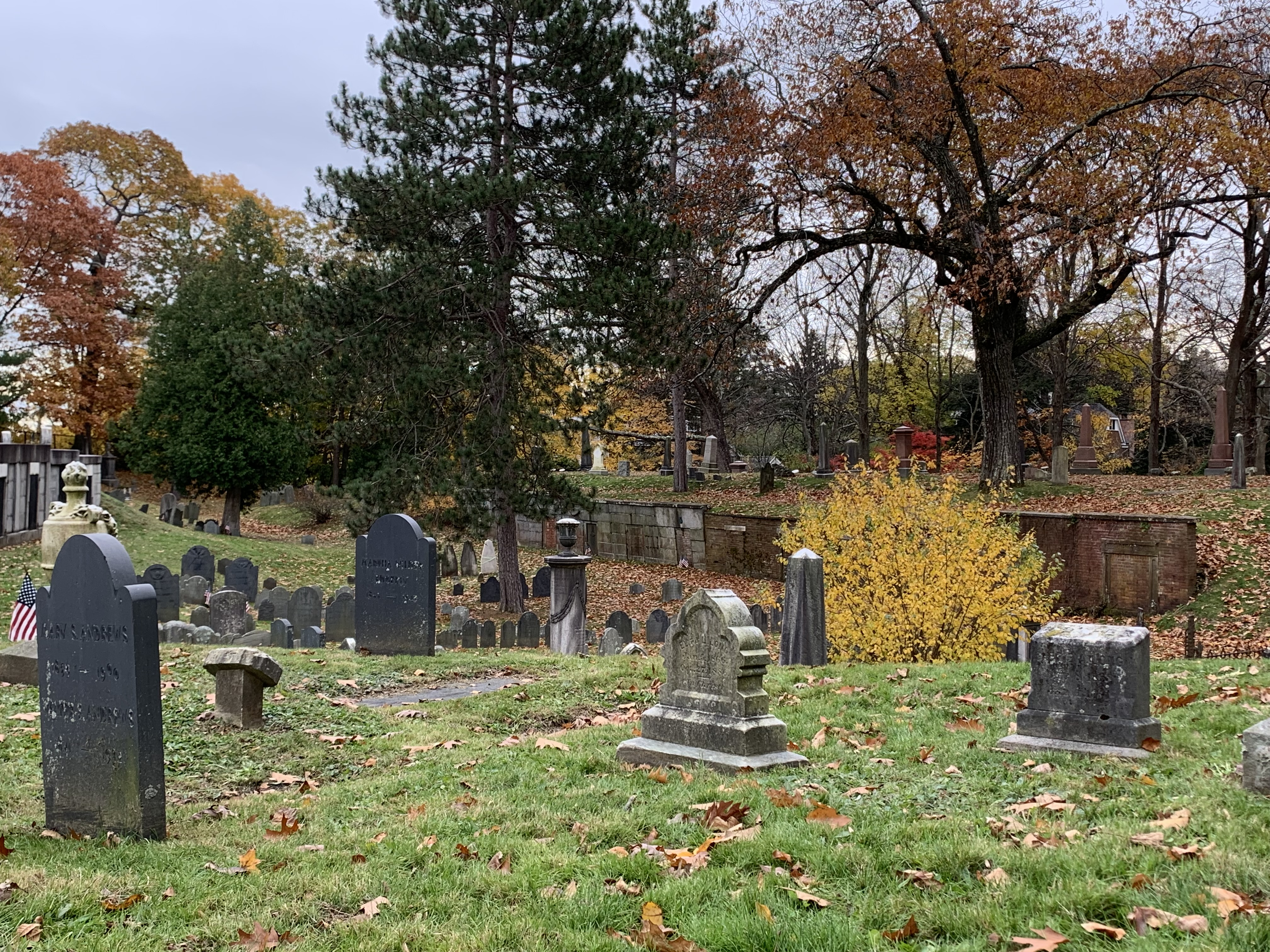
- Interactive map of Old Burying Ground

Details
- Established: 1717
- Location: Brookline, Massachusetts
- Coordinates: 42°19′38″N 71°07′40″W
- Size: 1.54 acres (0.62 ha)
- No. of interments: >1,300
- Website: Official website
- Find a Grave: Old Burying Ground
- The Political Graveyard: Old Burying Ground

The Old Burying Ground, also known as Walnut Street Cemetery, was the first cemetery established in Brookline, Massachusetts, in 1717. It was the town's only cemetery for 140 years until the establishment of the Holyhood Cemetery in 1857, and the Walnut Hills Cemetery in 1875. The cemetery is part of the Brookline Town Green Historic District.

The cemetery remains open to visitors but is no longer active, with the last burial occurring in 1995.

== Notable interments ==
- Francis C. Barlow (1834–1896), Civil War general
- Zabdiel Boylston (1679–1766), physician and surgeon
- Amanda M. Edmond (1824–1862), poet
- Barnas Sears (1802–1880), President of Brown University
