= Brookline Town Green Historic District =

Historic district in Massachusetts, United States

- U.S. National Register of Historic Places
- U.S. Historic district
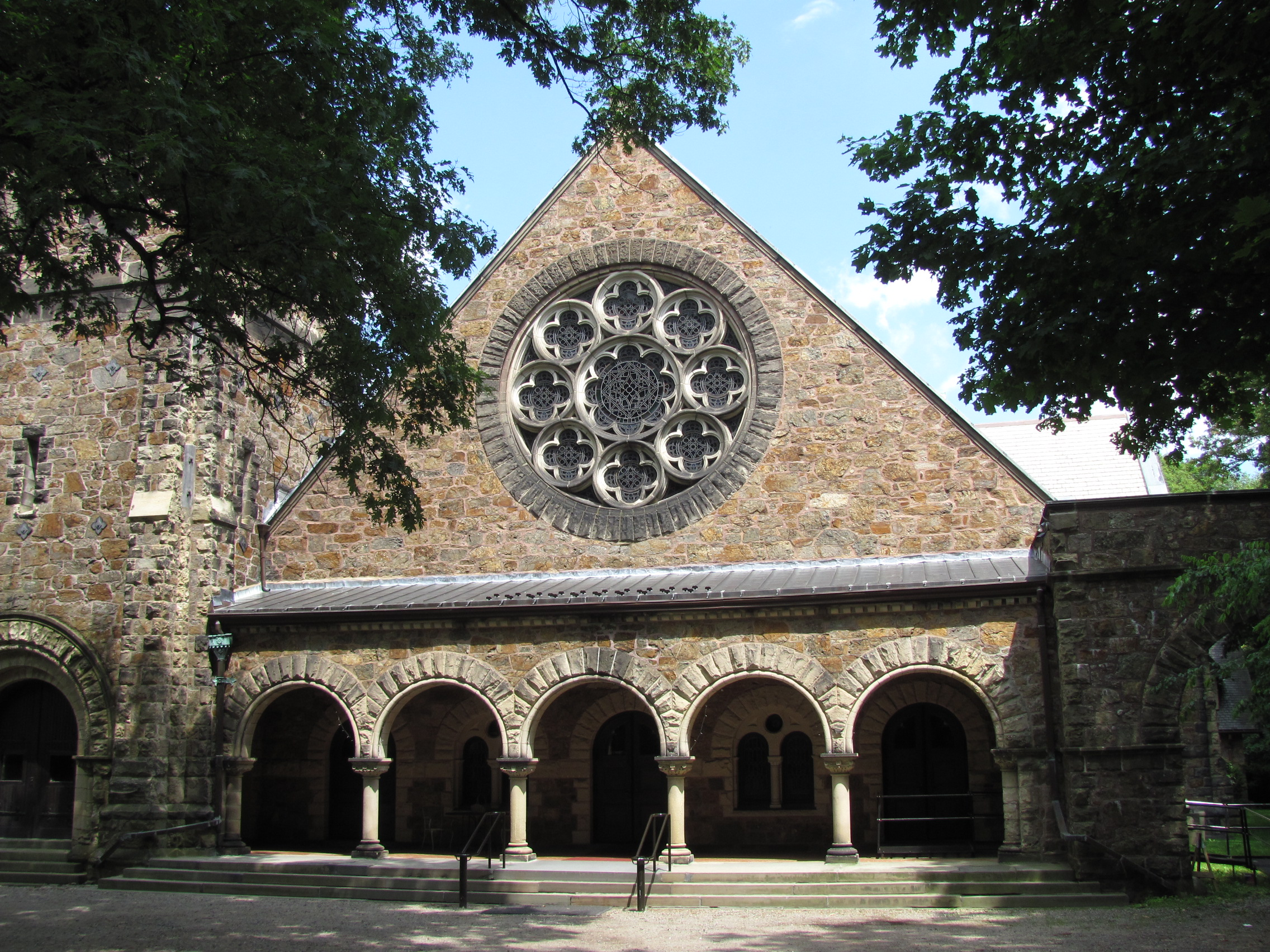
- First Parish in Brookline

- Location within Massachusetts Location within the United States
- Location: Chestnut Pl., Fairmont, Dudley, Boyston, Walnut and Warren Sts., Hedge, Codman, and Kennard Rds., Brookline, Massachusetts
- Coordinates: 42°19′36″N 71°7′53″W
- Built: 1717
- Architect: Gridley James Fox Bryant, et al
- Architectural style: Colonial Revival, Greek Revival, Italianate
- NRHP reference No.: 80000650
- Added to NRHP: June 22, 1980

The Brookline Town Green Historic District encompasses the historic colonial heart of the town of Brookline, Massachusetts. Centered on a stretch of Walnut Street between Warren and Chestnut Streets, this area is where the town's first colonial meeting house and cemetery were laid out, and was its center of civic life until the early 19th century. The district was listed on the National Register of Historic Places in 1980.

== Description and history ==
The area that is now the town of Brookline was known as Muddy River in the 17th century, after a crossing point of the eponymous river. The town was incorporated in 1705, and the site for its first meeting house and cemetery were chosen near what was at the time its geographic center. Brookline is unusual in Massachusetts in that its first town hall still survives: it is a stone structure built in 1825, now serving as the parish hall of the First Parish Church on Walnut Street. The town's Old Burying Ground, located at Walnut and Chestnut Streets, was also laid out at that time. When the Worcester Turnpike (now Massachusetts Route 9) opened in the early 19th century, the town's civic focus moved to Brookline Village. Later in the 19th century, the surrounding farmland was subdivided and fashionable residences were built.

The historic district is bounded on the east by Kennard Street, Chestnut Place, and a portion of Chestnut Street, and on the south by Codman Place, part of Walnut Street, Welch Road, and Warren Street. The western boundary is part of Lee Street between Warren and Dudley Streets, and the northern border skirts the southern edge of Reservoir Park and then runs along Massachusetts Route 9. Notable residential properties include the Frederick Law Olmsted National Historic Site. The district abuts the Green Hill Historic District to the south and east.

== See also ==
- National Register of Historic Places listings in Brookline, Massachusetts
