= Reputasyon =

- Title card
- Genre: Crime; Drama; Romance; Thriller; Suspense; Political thriller
- Developed by: ABS-CBN Studios; Ginny Monteagudo Ocampo
- Written by: Dang Bagas; Sonny Calvento; Arden Rod Condez; Ma. Nikki Jane Bunquin
- Directed by: Mervyn B. Brondial; Jeffrey R. Jeturian; Rechie A. Del Carmen
- Starring: Cristine Reyes; Jason Abalos; Rayver Cruz; Jill Yulo; Aiko Melendez
- Theme music composer: Jess Q. Lasaten
- Opening theme: "Ngayon" by Angeline Quinto
- Composer: George Canseco
- Country of origin: Philippines
- Original language: Filipino
- No. of seasons: 2
- No. of episodes: 140 (list of episodes)

Production
- Executive producers: Carlo Katigbak; Cory Vidanes; Laurenti Dyogi; Ginny Monteagudo-Ocampo
- Producer: Grace Ann Bodegon-Casimsiman
- Editor: Dennis Salgado
- Running time: 30-45 minutes
- Production company: GMO Drama Unit

Original release
- Network: ABS-CBN
- Release: July 11, 2011 – January 20, 2012

Reputasyon (transl. "reputation") is a Philippine television drama action series broadcast by ABS-CBN. Directed by Mervyn B. Brondial, Jeffrey R. Jeturian and Rechie A. Del Carmen, it stars Cristine Reyes, Rayver Cruz, Jason Abalos, Aiko Melendez and Jaclyn Jose. It aired on the network's Kapamilya Gold line up and worldwide on TFC from July 11, 2011 to January 20, 2012, and was replaced by Precious Hearts Romances Presents: Lumayo Ka Man sa Akin.

== Premise ==
Can one false accusation ruin a person's whole life? The story of Reputasyon begins with the idyllic life of Agnes de los Santos, whose family is respected by everyone in the small town of San Lucas. She dreams of becoming a teacher just like her mom and raising a family of her own with the man she loves. But her world shatters when her unexpected visit to their beloved governor's home turns into a huge scandal in their town. How can she prove that she's not there for a midnight tryst? Will anyone believe her innocence? What happens once she discovers that she's merely used to cover up a much greater crime?

== Cast and characters ==
=== Main cast ===
- Cristine Reyes as Agnes delos Santos - An obedient daughter to her parents, Agnes values the pride and integrity of her family in their town. She doesn't ask for much out of life except to finish her studies and be a teacher one day. But her life will head a turn for the worse when she's falsely accused as their town governor's mistress.
- Rayver Cruz as Henry Aragon - A man with a mysterious past, Henry will cross paths with Agnes at a most inopportune time. Although they would dislike each other at first, Henry is the only person who'll stand by Agnes when she's forced to leave her hometown out of shame.
- Jason Abalos as Boyet Mangubat - Boyet's childhood crush towards Agnes has turned into real love when they grew up. But he respects her decision to finish her studies first before entering a serious relationship.
- Aiko Melendez as Catherine Espeleta-Villamayor / Connie Aragon - Bernard's widowed wife and Henry's older sister. She accuses Agnes for having affair with her husband.

=== Supporting cast ===
- Jaclyn Jose as Luisa Alcantara-delos Santos
- Lito Pimentel as Jose delos Santos
- Jill Yulo as Niña delos Santos
- Laurice Guillen as Concordia Villamayor
- John James Uy as Randy Villamayor
- Andrei Garcia as Jun-Jun delos Santos
- Deborah Sun as Mindy Alcantara
- Bing Davao as Daniel Villamayor

=== Extended cast ===
- RR Enriquez as Monica
- Cherry Lou as Tina Dominguez
- Gino Paul Guzman as Miguel Jacinto
- Nico Antonio as Jaycee
- Zeppi Borromeo as Boy George
- Mara Lopez as Shiela
- Alex Castro as Manuel
- Shey Bustamante as Tricia
- Gem Ramos as Lily
- Arran Sese as Felix
- Savannah Lamsen as Camille
- Daphne Cortez as Myra
- Noel Colet as Boss Soriano
- Simon Ibarra as Itoy
- Erika Padilla as Precious
- Carlos Morales as Antonio Marasigan
- Arnold Reyes as Atty. Victor Sta. Maria
- Che Ramos as Lani Sta. Maria
- Elaine Quemuel as Mercy Rivera
- Manuel Chua as Marco Olivar
- Sunshine Garcia as Mica Gutierrez
- Paolo Serrano as Julius

=== Special participation ===
- Celso Ad. Castillo as Samuel Aragon
- Emilio Garcia as Gov. Bernard Villamayor
- Jane Oineza as Young Catherine Villamayor
- Kristel Moreno as Catherine (young adult)
- Kevin Viard as potential investor
- CJ Navato as Teen Henry
- Calvin Joseph Cajo Gomez as Young Henry

== Reception ==
KANTAR MEDIA NATIONAL TV RATINGS (2:45PM PST / 5:00PM PST)
PILOT EPISODE	FINALE EPISODE	PEAK	AVERAGE	SOURCE
10.1%	11.7%	16.6%	12.8%	

== Broadcast ==
Reputasyon is not available in selected ABS-CBN Regional channels due to local version of TV Patrol on the same time slot. Instead they replay or taped broadcast the following day after the yesterdays episode, either morning or afternoon time slot pre-empty Anime or Korean programs.

=== Reruns ===
Reputasyon began first airing rerun on Jeepney TV from August 11 to November 14, 2025 replacing the rerun of Mundo Man ay Magunaw and was replaced by the rerun of Rosalka.

== See also ==
- List of programs broadcast by ABS-CBN
- List of ABS-CBN Studios original drama series
