= Amanda M. Edmond =

American writer

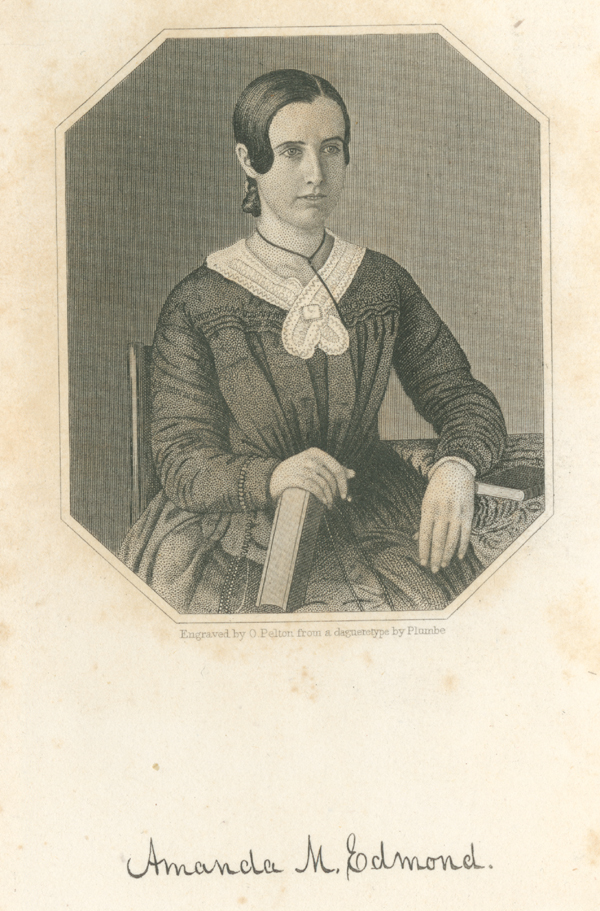
Portrait of Amanda Edmond from the frontispiece of The Broken Vow and Other Poems

Amanda Maria Corey Edmond (October 24, 1824 – May 30, 1862) was an American poet and children's writer of the Romantic era.

== Life and career ==
Born Amanda Maria Corey in Brookline, Massachusetts, Edmond was the daughter of Elijah Corey, Jr. and Mary Richards. Her family was of old New England stock; she was a lifelong Baptist, an outlook which informed much of her writing. In May 1844 she married Boston merchant James Edmond, with whom she had six children, two sons and four daughters. Two of their daughters, Amy and Jenny, died in childhood. For much of her life the family lived in Brookline, though they were for a time resident in Philadelphia. Edmond died of consumption, and was interred in Brookline's Walnut Street Cemetery. Her husband died in 1881.

Edmond began writing poetry in her youth, and produced a large body of work between the ages of fourteen and twenty; some of these pieces were published posthumously, to be shared with acquaintances. In 1845 appeared The Broken Vow and Other Poems, a copy of which was sent to hymnwriter James Montgomery; his response compared her work with that of Felicia Hemans and Joanna Baillie. Another copy was sent to Lydia Sigourney, who also responded with praise. Edgar Allan Poe reviewed the book for the Broadway Journal. Much of her poetry was of religious bent, but she wrote on other topics as well, including the abolition of slavery. A number of her books would go on to see use as Sunday school texts. Most of her poetry was published under her initials, "A.M.E."

== Works ==
Taken from:

- The Broken Vow and Other Poems (1844)
- Willie Grant; or, The Little Pharisee (1844)
- The Vase of Flowers: A Gift for the Young (1846)
- Ralph Mobrey: or, The Child of Many Prayers (1847)
- Early Days: pieces in prose and verse for the young (1848)
- Forget Me Not: A Gift for Sabbath School Children (1854)
- Memoir of Mrs. Sarah D. Comstock: missionary to Arracan (1854)
- Religious and Other Poems (1872)
