= The Better Half (2017 TV series) =

2017 Philippine television drama series

- Title card
- Genre: Melodrama; Romance; Psycho-thriller
- Created by: Mel Mendoza-Del Rosario
- Developed by: ABS-CBN Studios; Ginny Monteagudo-Ocampo
- Written by: Jimuel Dela Cruz; Jaymar Castro; Kay Conlu-Brondial; Zoilo Barrel; Mary Rose Colindres
- Directed by: Jeffrey R. Jeturian; Topel Lee
- Starring: Shaina Magdayao; Carlo Aquino; JC de Vera; Denise Laurel
- Opening theme: "Hanggang" by Erik Santos and Morissette
- Country of origin: Philippines
- Original language: Filipino
- No. of episodes: 147

Production
- Executive producers: Carlo Katigbak; Cory Vidanes; Laurenti Dyogi; Ginny Monteagudo-Ocampo
- Producers: Grace Ann Bodegon-Casimsiman; Sharleen Roanne Tan
- Cinematography: Neil Daza
- Editors: Joy Buenaventura; Pamela Kim Katigbak; Ron Ilagan; Levi Ligon
- Running time: 36–38 minutes
- Production company: GMO Unit

Original release
- Network: ABS-CBN
- Release: February 13 – September 8, 2017

The Better Half is a 2017 Philippine television drama series broadcast by ABS-CBN. Directed by Jeffrey R. Jeturian and Topel Lee, it stars Shaina Magdayao, Carlo Aquino, JC de Vera and Denise Laurel. It aired on the network's Kapamilya Gold line up and worldwide on TFC from February 13 to September 8, 2017.

== Synopsis ==
Camille (Shaina Magdayao) is happily married to Marco (Carlo Aquino). Meanwhile, Bianca (Denise Laurel), Marco's childhood friend, is secretly in love with him. She begs Marco to marry her but Marco's heart is only for Camille.

After Marco's and Camille's wedding, Marco flies to Dubai as an overseas worker. Unfortunately, the plane crashes with no survivors. Bianca, obsessed with Marco, does not stop searching for him and finds him stranded in an island. Marco suffers amnesia but remembers Bianca from his childhood. Bianca decides to use his amnesia and builds an intricate lie to him about his life: she tells him she is his wife and they live together as man and wife. Meanwhile, Camille is distraught over her husband's death and eventually meets Rafael (JC de Vera), they fall in love and get married. Camille runs a school and the couple try to have a baby.

Months after, Bianca's greatest fear comes true as Marco begins to slowly recover his memories of another woman, but is unable to put figure it out. Bianca uses information she gathers about Camille and manipulates Marco into believing his recovering memories are of her. However, Marco continues to pursue his unanswered questions about his memories.

Bianca discovers she is pregnant and ultimately, Marco chooses to go with Bianca to the United States. They soon get married, and Bianca gives birth to a baby girl they name Julia. They are a happy family and soon set up a furniture business. But Bianca's father suffers a heart attack and Bianca is required to return home to run her father's failing business, so Bianca and Marco return to Manila with their dad alighted Julia, who is enrolled in the school run by Camille. Bianca discovers that her father signed a partnership agreement with Rafael's company.

Marco and Camille's world collide, but Marco does not recognize Camille. When his memory returns, Camille petitions for an annulment of their first marriage. Camille loves Rafael and has moved on from Marco. Bianca's obsession and paranoia gets worse and life becomes dangerous for Camille, Rafael and her loved ones. In Bianca's psychotic state, she kills most of Camille's loved ones, including Rafael, and Camille almost perishes but is saved by Marco.

== Cast and characters ==
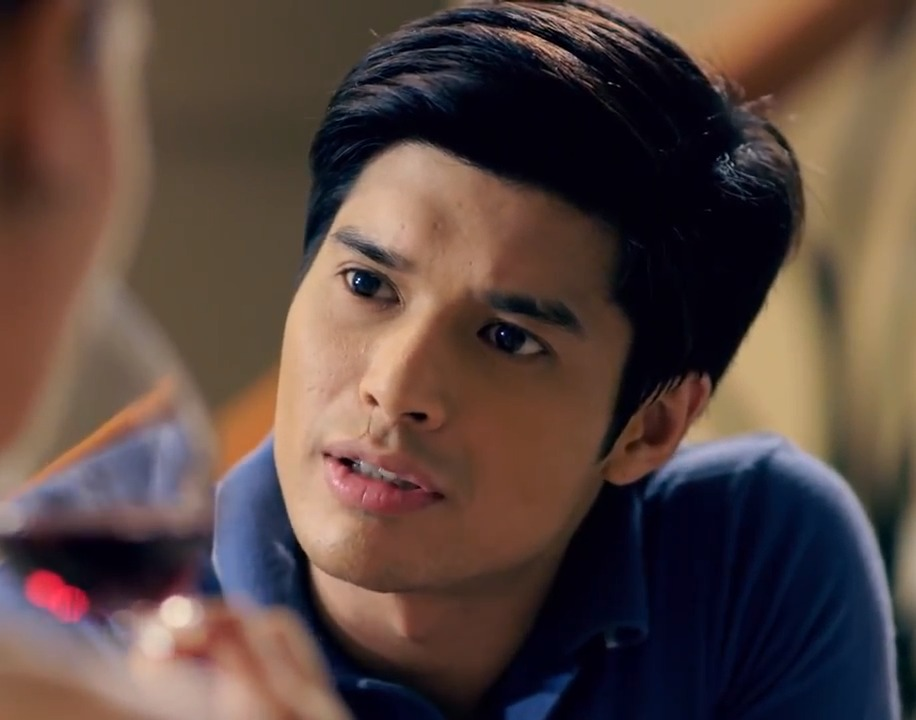
JC de Vera portrays Rafael Cabrera.

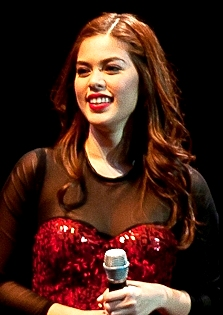
Shaina Magdayao portrays Camille Villalobos Saison/Camille Villalobos Cabrera

=== Main cast ===
- Shaina Magdayao as Camille Villalobos Saison/Camille Villalobos Cabrera- A sweet, loving, kindhearted wife, but tough fighter person. The main protagonist. First wife of Marco, but she thought he died in a plane crash. Years later, she moved on, met and fell in love with Rafael Cabrera, the love of her life. They married, and it was only years later that they learned that Marco was still alive, with a family of his own. This complicated their marriage status, so Camille filed for an annulment.
- Carlo Aquino as Marco Saison- The former husband of Camille and object of obsession by Bianca. He was rescued from a plane crash by Bianca and kept in an island, as Bianca fabricated a story that they were in love. She told him he suffered from amnesia after a car accident, Marco grew up with Bianca and was her protector. After his accident, his memory of Camille was wiped out, and he only remembered Bianca. It was easy for him to believe Bianca's lies that they had a deep girlfriend/boyfriend relationship.
- JC de Vera as Rafael Cabrera- The loving husband of Camille. He rescued Camille from a deep depression after she thought Marco died. He is the scion of Luis Cabrera Group of Companies, one of the country's top property development firm. He marries Camille and they are very happy together. However, when Marco emerged, the uncertainty of the legal status of their marriage caused a big rift in their relationship, particularly with Rafael's mother, who initially pushed for an annulment of Rafael and Camille's marriage. Despite the many obstacles they faced, Camille and Rafael's love triumphed. Unfortunately he is killed by Bianca.
- Denise Laurel as Bianca Buenaflor Saison- She is the main female antagonist and serial killer of the series. She will do anything for Marco. She had a tragic past when she was repeatedly raped by her uncle and her stepmother did not stop it. She suffered many mental disorders like Bipolar disorder, Schizophrenia, and others. She killed her stepmother and planned to kill any protagonist of the series, she killed the antagonistic Mayora played by Carmi Martin because she knew that Bianca brainwashed Marco. In the end, she was killed, but not before killing the main protagonist of the series (Rafael) and others.

=== Supporting cast ===
- Nadia Montenegro as Susan Villalobos - Camille's loving mother.
- Maila Gumila as Clarita Alejo-Buenaflor - Revealed to be the third antagonist who witnessed her brother raping Bianca however she did not do anything but later she is killed by Bianca, by shooting her at the cemetery.
- Joyce Ann Burton as Helen Leviste-Cabrera- Rafael's overprotective mother and antagonistic toward Camille.
- Rommel Padilla as Edgar Villalobos- Camille's loving father.
- Bart Guingona as Alfredo Buenaflor - The secondary antagonist of the series. Bianca's father who dislike Marco in his daughter's life. So he planned to kill him instead, he is the one who helped Bianca in her evil plans against her enemies. He is accidentally killed by Rafael due to his escape to the police.
- Mari Kaimo as Luisito Cabrera - Rafael's father.
- Carmi Martin as Mayor Dyna "Mayora" Soriano - One of the two main antagonist of the series until up to her death the other one is Bianca Buenaflor. She is one of the arch-enemies of the main villain (Bianca). She is the evil mayor of the city. And the one who killed Rafael's sister. She knows everything Bianca did to Marco, like how she brainwashed Marco and killed Sheryl Canlas. She is killed by Bianca by poisoning her.

== Reception ==
Kantar Media National TV Ratings (3:30PM / 4:15PM PST)
Pilot Episode	Finale Episode	Peak	Average
16.8% February 13, 2017	18.3% September 8, 2017	18.3% September 8, 2017	15.4%

== Production ==
The Better Half was announced in October 2016, with Shaina Magdayao in the lead role, and JC de Vera, Carlo Aquino, and Denise Laurel rounding out the main cast. According to ABS-CBN Business Unit head Ginny Monteagudo-Ocampo, the series is similar to psychological thriller films such as Fatal Attraction (1987), Gone Girl (2014), or Single White Female (1992).

=== Timeslot change ===
After The Greatest Love ended, the management decided to move The Better Half to 4:15 PM giving way for Pusong Ligaw to take the 3:30 PM timeslot. It was originally supposed to be aired on the 6:00 pm time slot.

== Re-runs ==
It aired re-runs on Jeepney TV from July 8, 2017 to January 20, 2018; August 11, 2019 to January 26, 2020; November 7, 2022 to February 17, 2023; June 29 to December 14, 2025 and September 28, 2026 to April 16, 2027.

It also aired re-runs on PIE Channel as part of its non-block exclusive slot from January 16 to August 11, 2023.

== See also ==
- List of programs broadcast by ABS-CBN
- List of drama series of ABS-CBN
- List of programs broadcast by Jeepney TV
