= Jeffrey Jeturian =

Filipino director

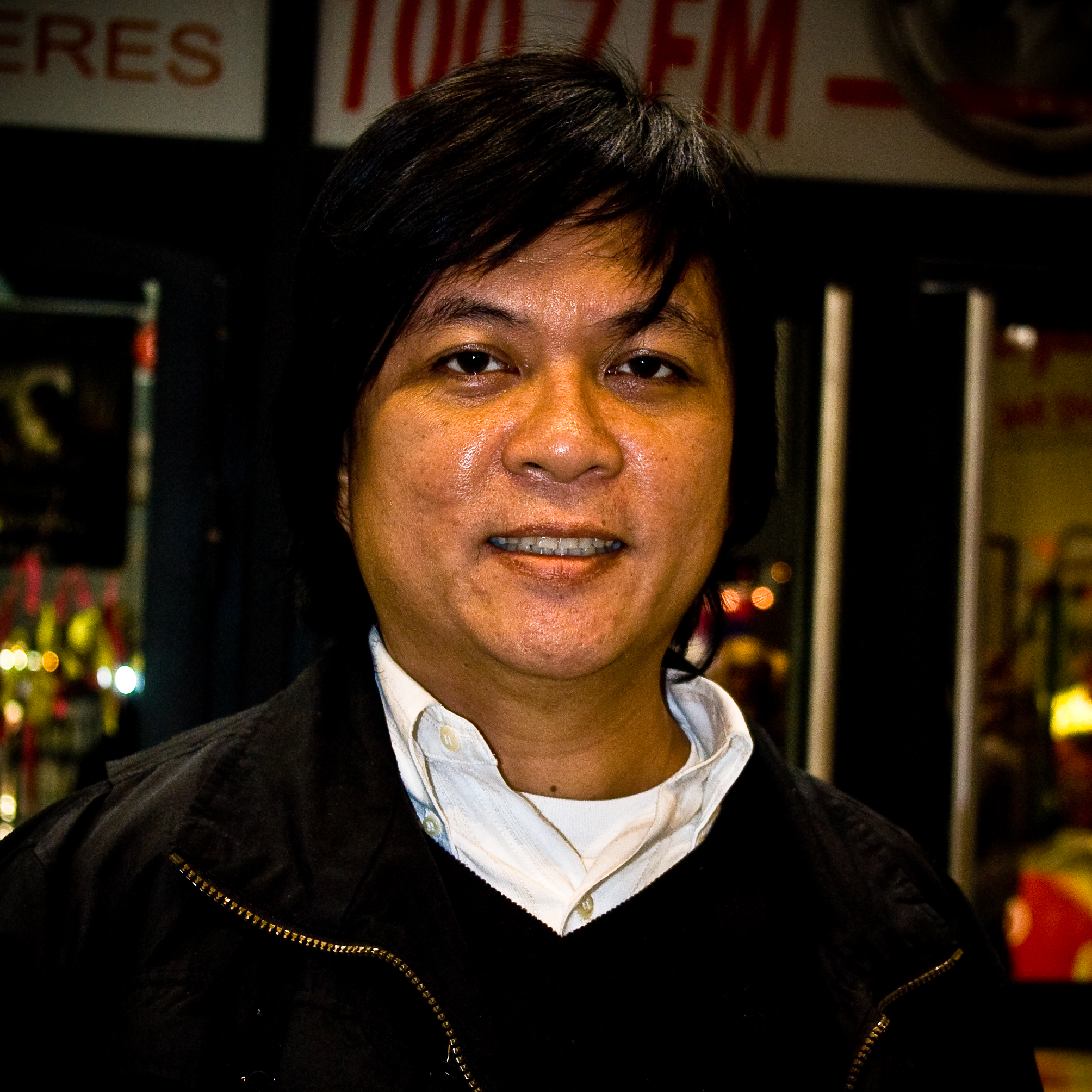
- Born: November 4, 1959 (age 66); Manila, Philippines
- Occupation: Director
- Years active: 1989–present

Jeffrey Jeturian (born November 4, 1959) is a Filipino director and production designer for both television and film. Jeturian won the Gawad Urian Best Director Award in 2007 for the film Kubrador. He studied Broadcasting Communication at the University of the Philippines Diliman.

== Filmography ==
=== Film ===
Release date	Title	Film studio	Remarks
2015	Lakambini	Erasto Films	Co-directed by Ellen Ongkeko-Marfil
2013-07-27	Ekstra	Cinemalaya and Quantum Films	
2011-07-15	Bisperas	Cinemalaya	Best Film (Director's Showcase) at the 7th CIFF
2006	Kubrador	MLR Films	Gawad Urian Best Director
2004-11-24	Minsan Pa	MLR Films	
2003-10-19	Limangpung Taong Ligawan: The Pinoy TV Story	ABS-CBN	
2004-01-01	Bridal Shower	Seiko Films	
2001-02-21	Tuhog (Larger Than Life)	Available Light Production and Regal Films	
1999-06-02	Pila-Balde	Good Harvest Productions	NETPAC Special Mention at the 1st Cinemanila International Film Festival
1998-12-02	Sana... Pag-ibig Na	Good Harvest Productions	

=== Television ===
==== As director ====
Year	Title	Network
2022	What We Could Be	GMA Network
2020	Oh My Dad!	TV5
2020	Love Thy Woman	ABS-CBN
2018	Playhouse	ABS-CBN
2017	Hanggang Saan	ABS-CBN
2017	The Better Half	ABS-CBN
2016	We Will Survive	ABS-CBN
2015	Ningning	ABS-CBN
2015	Nasaan Ka Nang Kailangan Kita	ABS-CBN
2014	Dream Dad	ABS-CBN
2012	Be Careful With My Heart	ABS-CBN
2012	Mundo Man ay Magunaw	ABS-CBN
2011	Reputasyon	ABS-CBN
2010	Juanita Banana	ABS-CBN
2010	M3: Malay Mo Ma-develop	ABS-CBN
2010	Rosalka	ABS-CBN
2009	The Wedding	ABS-CBN
2001	Biglang Sibol, Bayang Impasibol	GMA Network
1999	Kirara, Ano ang Kulay ng Pag-ibig?	GMA Network
1999	Rio Del Mar	GMA Network

==== As production designer ====
Year	Title	Network
1988	Nang Magtampo ang Bukas	Viva Television
