= List of The Greatest Love episodes =

The Greatest Love is a Philippine family melodrama television series directed by Dado C. Lumibao and Mervyn Brondial, starring Sylvia Sanchez, Nonie Buencamino, Dimples Romana, Andi Eigenmann, Arron Villaflor, Matt Evans, and Joshua Garcia. The series premiered on ABS-CBN's Kapamilya Gold afternoon block and worldwide on The Filipino Channel on September 5, 2016, to April 21, 2017, replacing Tubig at Langis. It had a total of 163 episodes and was succeeded by The Better Half from an early timeslot.

== Series overview ==
Season	Episodes	First aired	Last aired	Monthly Average
Season	Episodes	First aired	Last aired	Nationwide
Season 1	90	September 5, 2016	January 6, 2017	14.49%
Season 2	73	January 9, 2017	April 21, 2017	

== List of episodes ==
Color key
- - Peak
- - Lowest Rating

=== Season 1 ===
#	No. in season	Title	Original Air Date	Twitter Hashtag	Kantar Media Rating (Nationwide)	Source
1	1	"Pagsisimula" (Begins)	September 5, 2016	#TheGreatestLoveBegins	15.7%	
At the height of a typhoon, Gloria's father, Mang Zosimo, collapses in pain from his rheumatism. Gloria has to take a boat ride to town to buy her father's medicine. However, there are no boats running on the return due to the strong winds and heavy rain. Peter waits for Gloria to accompany her back. Unable to return safely, they take shelter in a cave overnight. Gloria and Peter fall in love.
2	2	"Hindi Nabunyag" (Untold)	September 6, 2016	#TheGreatestLoveUntold	14.9%	
Peter and Gloria become lovers. Peter decides to work abroad so he can support Gloria whom he asks to marry him. They embark on a long-distance relationship.
3	3	"Sorpresa" (Surprises)	September 7, 2016	#TheGreatestLoveSurprises	15.7%	
Gloria reminisces about her past. Peter didn't come back for Gloria. Gloria goes back to reality when Z, Gloria's grandson, showed up to surprise her a day after her birthday. Z brought Gloria back to her house, and she is surprised when Andrei, Lizelle and Gloria's friends surprised her, but Amanda and Paeng didn't make it on time because Paeng got into an accident when he lost control of his motor and Amanda was busy at work. They went back to the house when the doctor discharged Paeng and they happily celebrated Gloria's birthday as one big happy family.
4	4	"Ang Pag-alok ng Kasal" (The Proposal)	September 8, 2016	#TGLTheProposal	15.1%	
Peter returned for Gloria exactly on her wedding day with Andres. But Andres said to remember their child and do not return to Peter. The incident was something Gloria can never forget. Meanwhile, Gerald, Lizelle's boyfriend, finally proposed to her. But, the ring was too loose for Lizelle's finger, causing her to lose the ring.
5	5	"Mga Sikreto" (Secrets)	September 9, 2016	#TGLSecrets	14.6%	
Paeng and Lizelle argue about honesty. In Lizelle's case, it is because she kept that she lost the ring a secret. In Paeng's case, it's about the debts he got without asking help from his family. Before Lizelle gets married, she wants to tell the truth about herself to Gerald that she is an illegitimate child and that she is not an "Alegre".
6	6	"Natuklasan" (Discover)	September 12, 2016	#TGLDiscover	14.4%	
Gloria plans to buy one hectare of land for a house that she will build for her 60th birthday. On the other hand, Lizelle told Gerald the truth, the truth about her father, that she is an illegitimate child. She confronted Gloria on who is her real father, Gloria only gave the name, and the name of Lizelle's father was Peter.
7	7	"Kumbinsihin" (Convince)	September 13, 2016	#TGLConvince	15.4%	
Lizelle forgives Gloria about lying in who her real father is. But this doesn't stop her from searching. Lizelle asks Lydia, Gloria's best friend since they were teens, about Gloria's past relationships because it is possible that one of them might be her father. The information that Lydia provided was only the surname of Peter, so Lizelle discovered that her father's name is Peter Alcantara.
8	8	"Mga Desisyon" (Decisions)	September 14, 2016	#TGLDecisions	15.9%	
The search continues - now that Lizelle discovered her father's name, Lizelle goes to Bagong Ilog to search for Peter. She asked some of the people there, unfortunately, she discovered that Peter isn't there for a long time. Meanwhile, Gloria's plan to buy one hectare of land will not push through because someone bought it first.
9	9	"Pagkatao" (Identity)	September 15, 2016	#TGLIdentity	13.9%	
As Gloria helps Amanda to get her promotion by participating in a commercial about a mother's love, Gloria remembered a secret that almost broke her family when her husband Andres died. She remembered that Amanda almost left her when she discovered Gloria had an affair with Peter in the middle of her marriage with Andres. And there - Lizelle was the result of Gloria and Peter's illicit love.
10	10	"Suliranin Ng Pamilya" (Family Affair)	September 16, 2016	#TGLFamilyAffair	13.1%	
All the members of the Alegre family is all facing a problem.: 1. For Lizelle - It is still about her real father. Lizelle can't find him because she lack information.; 2. For Paeng - Still about the debts he got without paying for it. He borrowed money from Gloria and said that the money was for his motorcycle because it has many broken parts.; 3. For Amanda - She is still struggling to get the promotion because her officemate is ruining her presentation by finding negatives in it.; 4. For Andrei - He is still finding a way on how will he tell the truth to Gloria that he has a boyfriend.; 5. For Gloria - She is getting more forgetful. And secrets from the past unveil causing her children to leave her one by one.
11	11	"Sumpong" (Breakdown)	September 19, 2016	#TGLBreakdown	13.1%	
Paeng told the truth to Gloria that he need P150,000 because he lost in the casino and Gloria has no choice but to get the money from her savings in building the house in Bagong Ilog. Afterwards, Gloria started showing signs of Alzheimer's disease by forgetting many things. She also fainted because of hypertension and cannot shoot the commercial due to sickness, so Alvin decided to shoot the commercial in Gloria's house even if it is not in favor with Amanda.
12	12	"Minanang Bahay" (Ancestral House)	September 20, 2016	#TGLAncestralHouse	10.3%	
As Gloria shoots the commercial in the ancestral house, an unexpected visitor suddenly appeared, Stella Alegre, Andres' cousin and almost made a scene by saying Gloria has no right in the ancestral house since she had an affair with Peter when she and Andres were still married, she also said that Gloria is unfaithful and a liar, but Amanda immediately stopped her. Meanwhile, when the commercial was released, Peter saw it and remembered his happy moments with Gloria when they were still together.
13	13	"Araw ng Usapan" (Appointment)	September 21, 2016	#TGLAppointment	13.0%	
Peter set an appointment with Gloria about the lot. Meanwhile, Gloria's commercial shoot turned out successfully despite her condition. So after the successful shoot of the commercial, they celebrated as one big happy family, but without Paeng because he is busy practicing in his house.
14	14	"Pagtugis" (Pursuit)	September 22, 2016	#TGLPursuit	12.4%	
Peter and Gloria almost saw each other in the appointment Peter set, but didn't work because Peter can't face Gloria and the guards were there to stop Gloria from entering Peter's office. Gloria was really willing to go not knowing that Peter was the one she was going to meet because Peter hid in the name "Mr A".
15	15	"Senyales" (Signs)	September 23, 2016	#TGLSigns	—N/a	—N/a
Lizelle met Gerald's parents, it turned out well but Gerald lied, saying that: 1. Gloria owns a buy and sell business.; 2. Paeng is a band manager.; 3. Andrei works as a cosmetic consultant.; He lied to his parents which angers Lizelle the most, because he is acting like he is not proud of Lizelle's family. Paeng, on the other hand, was removed by his bandmates because they were also affected by the people who Paeng borrowed money to, the one who took Paeng's place in the band was his ex-girlfriend, Sheila. Gloria also starts being forgetful by mistaking Sandro to Peter.
16	16	"Pahintulot" (Permission)	September 26, 2016	#TGLPermission	13.8%	
The dinner of the Alegres and the Samontes didn't turn out well. The lies that Gerald told his parents were out. That Andrei is a make up artist not a cosmetic consultant. Gloria owns a junkshop not buy and sell business. Causing Gerald and Lizelle to argue.
17	17	"Pag-aaway" (Clash)	September 27, 2016	#TGLClash	14.0%	
Amanda got mad at Lizelle when she told Gerald's parents that she is an illegitimate child because this is a dramatic scene for Z. Gloria bursts out in madness because all her children are fighting. Because of this, she remembered her past about Andres, that Andres likes her but she likes Peter. So Andres took the chance where Mang Zosimo and Peter is not around to rape Gloria. That incident of her life resulted to Amanda.
18	18	"Maitim na Nakaraan" (Dark Past)	September 28, 2016	#TGLDarkPast	14.6%	
Gloria's family is broken. This part of her life makes her remember something in her past. She almost had Amanda aborted when she was in her womb because it angers her remembering what Andres did to her. Andres raped her because he got rejected by Gloria, also knowing that Gloria loves Peter, not him. That resulted to Amanda. She also almost had Amanda aborted when she was still a fetus because she thinks that Amanda can ruin her life. But her conscience prevailed and stopped the girl who would be the one to abort Amanda.
19	19	"Pumanig" (Taking Sides)	September 29, 2016	#TGLTakingSides	16.6%	
Amanda's anger to Gloria is really at its fullest. She didn't like his son Z to talk to Gloria. Paeng and Lizelle are also mad at Gloria. Because of Lizelle's anger, she left Gloria's house. Only Andrei is not mad at Gloria. How will Gloria fix her broken family now that all of her memories are slowly being erased?
20	20	"Pag-Alala" (Recall)	September 30, 2016	#TGLRecall	13.4%	
Gerald angrily went to Gloria's house finding Lizelle, he said he needs to talk to her. But because of the dinner that did not turn out well, he left Gloria's house and went to Andrei. When Gerald left the house, Gloria went back to her room to rest and suddenly fainted. She was brought to the hospital by Lydia. In the hospital, she cannot remember all of the happenings about the dinner. So she is scheduled to have a test if she is infected with some sort of disease.
21	21	"Mapanganib na Sona" (Danger Zone)	October 3, 2016	#TGLDangerZone	13.9%	
Gloria knew the truth from her doctor if she has a good health, but she needs to go to a neurologist because of her memory lapses. She will have to face a bigger problem of her life now because she is becoming more forgetful and her children still can't forgive her.
22	22	"Pag-Amin" (Admit)	October 4, 2016	#TGLAdmit	13.1%	
Because of Gloria's unexpected and strange memory loss, she decided to see a neurologist. Gerald then follows Lizelle to fix their problem but instead of fixing the problem, it became worst. Because Gerald lost his patience with Lizelle so he released harsh words to Lizelle which made her angry and cancelled the wedding.
23	23	"Sangang Daan" (Crossroads)	October 5, 2016	#TGLCrossroads	14.7%	
Due to Lizelle's heartbreak, she decided to find herself by walking alone in the road, and she was almost bumped by a car until Peter saved her. They met each other on the road but didn't know that they were related to each other. Lizelle realized that the man who saved her was Peter. But they separated roads when she realized it.
24	24	"Atake" (Attack)	October 6, 2016	#TGLAttack	12.2%	
Melissa, Gerald's mother, used social media to ruin Amanda and Gloria's name. Because of this, the company that Amanda works on can lose builders home. Gloria, on the other hand, went to a neurologist to test if she has something in her brain. Everything in Gloria's brain is ok. But, the doctor tried to test Gloria by saying words that Gloria should repeat after a while, it turns out that she can't remember the 3 words which is Simbahan, Mesa and Cellphone. She can only remember one word.
25	25	"Harapan" (Confront)	October 7, 2016	#TGLConfront	12.0%	
Since Gloria is in Manila, Z invited her to their house because Amanda will be back in midnight. So, Z and Gloria bonds, but to their surprise, Amanda came back from work early because of Mrs Samonte's false accusations. And she saw Gloria in her house with Z. Resulting to another family problem.
26	26	"Pagmamalasakit" (Concern)	October 10, 2016	#TGLConcern	14.7%	
Amanda bursts out. Making Z's communication and relationship to his MommyLa affected. Amanda said that Z can't text or call her. Aside from that, Amanda has another problem about Mrs. Samonte. They tried to fill the comment section of Gloria's commercial and deleted all of Melissa's comments. Now, this will anger Amanda more if she caught Z and Gloria together again niw that she has two problem, business problem and family problem.
27	27	"Sakit ng Pagiging Makakalimutin" (Alzheimer's)	October 11, 2016	#TGLAlzheimers	14.9%	
Gloria discovered that she is infected with Alzheimer's disease and the doctor told her to tell it to her children, but she chose not to. Meanwhile, Lizelle set an appointment with Peter to tell him the truth, but Peter was not convinced even if it is the truth.
28	28	"Awayan" (Brawl)	October 12, 2016	#TGLBrawl	15.3%	
Lizelle told Andrei that he set an appointment with Peter, so Lizelle and Andrei fought. Moments after, Amanda caught Z with Gloria at Ken's coffee shop. Even if Z consulted his father if he can go out with Gloria, Amanda still got mad at Gloria and Z because she can't forgive Gloria on Mrs. Samonte's comments and they could also lose builder's home because of this. Greta is revealed to be Mrs. Samonte's accomplice to bring Amanda down in the company. But Amanda didn't know all along that Greta was the one who was using Mrs. Samonte to bring her down.
29	29	"Ipinagbabawal" (Forbidden)	October 13, 2016	#TGLForbidden	15.5%	
Gloria's decision is final. She chose not to tell her children about her disease to avoid more problems. Meanwhile, Z consulted Chad about Gloria's walk if he can come with her, but before Chad answers, Amanda immediately said that no. Amanda is thinking Gloria as a bad influence to her child because Z learned many things from Gloria. One of them is that Z is learning to answer back to Amanda.
30	30	"Panawagan" (Appeal)	October 14, 2016	#TGLAppeal	14.0%	
Gloria begged Mrs Samonte to delete all the hate comments on the commercial to clean Amanda's name. Mrs Samonte deleted it, but several people saw the comments before it was deleted, so they believed in it and also hated the commercial.
31	31	"Kawalan ng Tiwala" (Disbelief)	October 17, 2016	#TGLDisbelief	14.8%	
Gloria finally meets Mr. A and discovers that he and Peter are one and the same person. As they met, Gloria explained all the difficulties on how she raised her family when Andres suddenly disappeared.
32	32	"Nasirang Pangako" (Broken Vow)	October 18, 2016	#TGLBrokenVow	13.7%	
Gloria once again looked back on her love story with Peter. Gloria all along thought that Andres abandoned them. Because of that, it resulted to Lizelle. Meanwhile, Mang Zosimo was diagnosed of liver cancer, causing Gloria to sell her things, including her camera which is a part of her dream, to be a photographer. To her surprise, she discovered that Peter used all his savings just to help her. But, Mang Zosimo later died.
33	33	"Mga Mahirap na Desisyon" (Tough Choices)	October 19, 2016	#TGLToughChoices	—N/a	—N/a
Gloria told Peter the truth about Lizelle's true self, that he is Lizelle's biological father, not Andres. In a flashback, it was shown that Lizelle was made because she thought that Andres abandoned them. Peter also offered to go away with Gloria, but before that, someone reported it to Andres causing him to go home.
34	34	"Walang Maalala" (Blackout)	October 20, 2016	#TGLBlackout	—N/a	—N/a
Gloria discovered that Lizelle went to Peter to tell him the truth. So Gloria calls Lizelle to confront her. Meanwhile, as Gloria and Peter's confrontation ends, Gloria decided to go home. But, in her way home, she doesn't know where she lives. This is the first attack of her Alzheimer's disease. Gloria went missing after that incident.
35	35	"Pagsagip" (Rescue)	October 21, 2016	#TGLRescue	13.5%	
As the search for Gloria goes on, she saw her commercial on television. Because of that, Gloria finally remembered where she lives.
36	36	"Paghahanap kay Gloria" (Finding Gloria)	October 24, 2016	#TGLFindingGloria	12.8%	
Gloria spent a night in Leklek and Oca's house while waiting for morning to go home. While Andrei and Lizelle are still bothered in finding their mother.
37	37	"Pauwi" (Home Bound)	October 25, 2016	#TGLHomeBound	14.1%	
Gloria went back to San Ildefonso where she lives.
38	38	"Importansya" (Importance)	October 26, 2016	#TGLImportance	13.5%	
Peter found out that his daughter, Lizelle, is one of his employees in his company.
39	39	"Pagtanggap" (Acceptance)	October 27, 2016	#TGLAcceptance	15.4%	
Peter (Nonie Buencamino) rejects Lizelle (Andi Eigenmann) again, because he don't believe that she is his daughter. He also stated that he only sees Gloria unfaithfulness because of Lizelle.
40	40	"Talunin" (Conquer)	October 28, 2016	#TGLConquer	14.6%	
Gloria finally decides to face her disease. The doctors revealed that her disease became more serious. She may not remember how to use a phone and how to walk. She also thought of a way so she can't forget her children by writing their names of their pictures.
41	41	"Makilala" (Recognize)	October 31, 2016	#TGLRecognize	12.4%	
Lydia came back from Australia. With that, she found out about Gloria's Alzheimer's disease. But, Gloria still holds her decision to hide this from her children. She also found out who is Mr A. Gloria, also won an award, the "Ulirang Ina" award.
42	42	"Paghahanda" (Preparation)	November 1, 2016	#TGLPreparation	12.7%	
Lizelle resigned on Nuevo Rio after Mr A. said bad things about Gloria because he still think that Gloria and Lizelle are lying for his money. Meanwhile, Lizelle's family still don't know that her boss is Peter.
43	43	"Pagkilala" (Tribute)	November 2, 2016	#TGLTribute	15.3%	
Peter finds out the truth behind Lizelle's parentage.
44	44	"Ulirang Ina" (The Greatest Mother)	November 3, 2016	#TGLUlirangIna	17.3%	
Upon accepting her "Ulirang Ina" award, Gloria gives a heartwarming speech that touches everyone, including Amanda. Peter arrives at the awards night and watches Gloria from the crowd, intent on speaking to Lizelle about the paternity test results.
45	45	"Mawasak" (Shattered)	November 4, 2016	#TGLShattered	15.6%	
Peter, Lizelle, and Gloria's unexpected reunion backstage at the Ulirang Ina award is interrupted when Gloria's other children find out.
46	46	"Ulirang Bes" (The Greatest Bes)	November 7, 2016	#TGLUlirangBes	14.8%	
Lydia tells Gloria's three oldest children that Peter is Gloria's first love.
47	47	"Ibalik" (Return)	November 8, 2016	#TGLReturn	13.3%	
Gloria decided to return her award to the Women's club because she stated that she needs to fix her family first and to prove that she really deserves that award.
48	48	"Hati" (Division)	November 9, 2016	#TGLDivision	13.0%	
Following the incident on the night of the Ulirang Ina award, Gloria's children decide to keep their distance from her.
49	49	"Pagbagsak" (Downfall)	November 10, 2016	#TGLDownfall	12.7%	
After Amanda picks up Paeng from the Alegre house, they both meet with Andrei and convince him to form a pact to stick with each other, convinced that Gloria has chosen Lizelle and Peter over them.
50	50	"Ibalik" (Restore)	November 11, 2016	#TGLRestore	13.5%	
Gloria tries to make peace with her children, starting with Andrei. She visits Ken's coffee shop and vows to tell Andrei everything but when the moment comes, she forgets what she wants to tell him.
51	51	"Bihira" (Uncertain)	November 14, 2016	#TGLUncertain	—N/a	—N/a
Unable to pay rent, Paeng is kicked out of his house and he decides to move back to the Alegre family house with Gloria. On his first day back, he notices signs of Gloria's forgetfulness. Peter requests to meet with Gloria in person to discuss an important matter.
52	52	"Pag-Amin" (Confess)	November 15, 2016	#TGLConfess	—N/a	—N/a
Gloria meets with Lizelle and Peter in Manila. Peter requests to have Lizelle's surname be legally changed from Alegre to Alcantara. Gloria reveals her condition to Peter and begs him not to tell anyone.
53	53	"Ibalik ang Dati" (Rekindle)	November 16, 2016	#TGLRekindle	14.8%	
Peter researches Alzheimer's disease after Gloria tells him her secret. Lizelle's birthday is coming up but she is reluctant to invite her siblings fearing that they will just turn her down. Amanda has a hard time looking for a new job as the events surrounding the Builders Home campaign haunt her in her interviews. Meanwhile, Y and Z get closer.
54	54	"Simpatya" (Sympathy)	November 17, 2016	#TGLSympathy	16.5%	
It's Lizelle's birthday and Peter holds a big party at his house in her honor. Lizelle's coworkers at Nuevo Rio, her old friends at the junk shop, Tita Lydia, Tito Jomar, and her mom Gloria attend. During the party, Gloria and Peter reminisce about Bagong Ilog. Peter contacts a neurologist looking for a second opinion regarding Gloria's prognosis.
55	55	"Matigas ang Ulo" (Stubborn)	November 18, 2016	#TGLStubborn	—N/a	—N/a
Y and Z decide to stop by Lizelle's birthday party, which Amanda finds out about after she sees a picture posted on Facebook. Peter asks Gloria to let him care for her but she refuses. Something blossoms between Lizelle and Sandro during the party. Ken encourages Andrei to try and make peace with Lizelle. Back in San Ildefonso, Paeng snoops around the house looking for loose cash to steal and accidentally finds Gloria's medical papers.
56	56	"Mabawi" (Regain)	November 21, 2016	#TGLRegain	14.2%	
Paeng discovered Gloria's Alzheimer's disease because he was trying to find things to sell for money. He is the first one of Gloria's children to know about this aside from Peter and Lydia.
57	57	"Kanlungan" (Refuge)	November 22, 2016	#TGLRefuge	—N/a	—N/a
Gloria and Peter went to a care facility for people with Alzheimer's disease. Meanwhile, Paeng was temporarily the boss of the junkshop while Gloria went to the doctor for a checkup.
58	58	"Silakbo" (Outburst)	November 23, 2016	#TGLOutburst	13.7%	
Paeng saw Gloria and Peter together and he can't hold his anger and immediately dashed to Gloria to confront her.
59	59	"Alarma" (Wake Up Call)	November 24, 2016	#TGLWakeUpCall	16.0%	
Paeng is worried on Gloria's disease because she is forgetting basic things like eating, especially when she thought that the calculator was her cellphone.
60	60	"Paglahok" (Involvement)	November 25, 2016	#TGLInvolvement	15.6%	
Sandro caught Paeng getting money from the junkshop's earnings. He took advantage of Gloria's Alzheimer's to secretly get money from the junkshop.
61	61	"Pagbisita" (The Visit)	November 28, 2016	#TGLTheVisit	12.9%	
Lizelle went to San Ildefonso to visit Gloria. But, tension rises as Paeng saw her.
62	62	"Pananabik" (Longing)	November 29, 2016	#TGLLonging	12.8%	
Gloria is still longing for her children. Meanwhile, Amanda accepts a sideline business from Alvin because she had no choice. Paeng, was caught by Sandro gambling.
63	63	"Kinalaman" (Involve)	November 30, 2016	#TGLInvolve	14.1%	
Sandro told Lizelle and Gloria the truth about what he discovered about Paeng.
64	64	"Hinala" (Suspicion)	December 1, 2016	#TGLSuspicion	—N/a	—N/a
Gloria tries to prove Lizelle and Sandro's accusations against Paeng, so she counted all the junkshop's earnings, and she discovered that the earnings are lacking P80,000, which made her suspicion against Paeng grow stronger. She also discovered that the earrings that Peter gave her are missing. Unknown to her is that Paeng sold it (sangla) in exchange of money for his gambling.
65	65	"Isyu sa Pagtitiwala" (Trust Issues)	December 2, 2016	#TGLTrustIssues	12.8%	
Tension rose on Paeng and Gloria as the issue of the junkshop's missing earnings opened. Meanwhile, Amanda and Chad are having a problem because Alvin built an agency wherein she and Amanda are partners which made Chad jealous.
66	66	"Pagbibigayan" (Compromise)	December 5, 2016	#TGLCompromise	13.8%	
Amanda and Chad fought once again. While Lizelle visited the junkshop when she discovered that Sandro left because of Paeng's attitude and accusations.
67	67	"Linlangin" (Deceive)	December 6, 2016	#TGLDeceive	13.0%	
Paeng confronted Sandro and Lizelle, which made Gloria angry. Because of this, Gloria mistaken Paeng as Andres due to her Alzheimer's disease.
68	68	"Pagbabalik sa Dati" (Relapse)	December 7, 2016	#TGLRelapse	14.3%	
Peter took Gloria to a ballroom for her to enjoy and forget all the problems with her family. While dancing, Jomar, Peter's right-hand man, offered Gloria to dance. Because of this, Gloria mistaken Jomar as Andres.
69	69	"Pagsisiwalat" (Disclosure)	December 8, 2016	#TGLDisclosure	15.0%	
As Sandro leaves the junkshop because of Paeng's attitude, Peter offered him a new job, as Lizelle's assistant. But he said no. After saying no, he confessed his love for Lizelle. He didn't accept the job because they can't act as friends anymore.
70	70	"Ang Kliente" (The Client)	December 9, 2016	#TGLTheClient	13.7%	
Amanda got shocked when she found out that Lizelle is her potential client.
71	71	"Mag-Aliw" (Console)	December 12, 2016	#TGLConsole	14.0%	
Amanda can't accept the possibility that her sister Lizelle might be her boss
72	72	"Tanggap" (Accept)	December 13, 2016	#TGLAccept	14.6%	
Lizelle gave Amanda two days to think about accepting the Vista Del Rio account.
73	73	"Hindi Naunawaan" (Misinterpret)	December 14, 2016	#TGLMisinterpret	15.5%	
Amanda decided to accept the Vista Del Rio account, but she cleared things up to Lizelle that they should be professional despite their family matters. Meanwhile, Andrei finally forgave Gloria and Peter after Peter saved him from a traffic war.
74	74	"Ang Proyekto" (The Project)	December 15, 2016	#TGLTheProject	14.2%	
Gloria's children will again have a connection as they join forces in a project. Meanwhile, Gloria begged love from Amanda. But, Amanda's anger prevailed and still can't forgive Gloria.
75	75	"Ang Imbitasyon" (The Invitation)	December 16, 2016	#TGLTheInvitation	15.3%	
Lizelle decided to set a meeting with her siblings about the project that they are going to make. But, tension rose on the middle of the meeting, not only because of work, but also because of their personal matters.
76	76	"Ang Awayan" (The Catfight)	December 19, 2016	#TGLTheCatfight	13.9%	
Tension rose on Amanda and Lizelle again. Just because Amanda didn't respond on time on their commercial presentation.
77	77	"Awayan ng Magkakapatid" (Sibling Rivalry)	December 20, 2016	#TGLSiblingRivalry	13.2%	
The Alegre siblings fought once again because Andrei told Amanda about Lizelle's help on the Vista Del Rio project.
78	78	"Kulang" (Incomplete)	December 21, 2016	#TGLIncomplete	—N/a	—N/a
Andrei told Lizelle that Paeng and Amanda doesn't like to celebrate Christmas with Gloria in San IIdefonso. Meanwhile, Peter discovered that Gloria's Alzheimer's disease worsen.
79	79	"Nawawala" (Missing)	December 22, 2016	#TGLMissing	13.8%	
80	80	"Pag-uwi" (Homecoming)	December 23, 2016	#TGLHomecoming	14.9%	
81	81	"Espiritu ng Pasko" (Christmas Spirit)	December 26, 2016	#TGLChristmasSpirit	11.9%	
82	82	"Kumpleto" (Complete)	December 27, 2016	#TGLComplete	12.1%	
83	83	"Poot" (Hatred)	December 28, 2016	#TGLHatred	11.9%	
84	84	"Ang Pangako" (The Promise)	December 29, 2016	#TGLThePromise	11.8%	
85	85	"Ang Malaking Kalampag" (The Big Bang)	December 30, 2016	#TGLTheBigBang	12.0%	
86	86	"Pagtutol" (Oppose)	January 2, 2017	#TGLOppose	13.5%	
87	87	"Ang Pagsang-ayon" (The Approval)	January 3, 2017	#TGLTheApproval	13.8%	
88	88	"Palagay" (Assumption)	January 4, 2017	#TGLAssumption	13.3%	
89	89	"Gera ng Magkadugo" (The Blood War)	January 5, 2017	#TGLTheBloodWar	17.0%	
Amanda, Andrei, Paeng, and Lizelle get into an intense argument in the Alegre house.
90	90	"Pagbuo" (The Build Up)	January 6, 2017	#TGLTheBuildUp	16.3%	

=== Season 2 ===
#	No. in season	Title	Original Air Date	Twitter Hashtag	Kantar Media Rating (Nationwide)	Source
91	1	"Mensahe" (Text Message)	January 9, 2017	#TGLTextMessage	15.6%	
Gloria tells her children via text message that she is dying. Meanwhile, Z learns of Gloria's illness as he watches the latter's recent self-recorded video diary.
92	2	"Sorpresa sa Kaarawan" (Birthday Surprises)	January 10, 2017	#TGLBirthdaySurprises	18.2%	
Andrei, Paeng, and Lizelle are relieved to see that Gloria is not really dying and they eat in celebration of Gloria's birthday. Amanda arrives in late and gets mad because she felt that Gloria had tricked her. An argument between the Alegre siblings ensues again and in the process, the effects of Gloria's illness begin to take hold.
93	3	"Ang Malalim na Salpok" (The Deep Impact)	January 11, 2017	#TGLTheDeepImpact	20.4%	
Gloria's children suddenly become emotional as they finally find out about their mother's illness.
94	4	"Pagpalit ng Puso" (Change of Heart)	January 12, 2017	#TGLChangeOfHeart	18.4%	
Gloria regains her memories again. Her children apologize to her and they celebrate her birthday for the rest of the night.
95	5	"Ang Sakit ng Pamilya" (The Family Disease)	January 13, 2017	#TGLTheFamilyDisease	18.0%	
96	6	"Ang Walang Hinihinging Kapalit na Pagmamahal" (The Unconditional Love)	January 16, 2017	#TGLTheUnconditionalLove	16.1%	
97	7	"Mga Anino Galing sa Nakaraan" (Shadows From The Past)	January 17, 2017	#TGLShadowsFromThePast	15.3%	
98	8	"Pagkuha ng Pagkakataon" (Taking Chances)	January 18, 2017	#TGLTakingChances	15.2%	
99	9	"Ang Loob at Labas" (The Inside Out)	January 19, 2017	#TGLTheInsideOut	15.2%	
100	10	"Laban sa Lahat" (Against All Odds)	January 20, 2017	#TGLAgainstAllOdds	15.3%	
101	11	"Ang Hindi Maitatangging Katotohanan" (The Undeniable Truth)	January 23, 2017	#TGLTheUndeniableTruth	—N/a	—N/a
102	12	"Masasamang Intensyon" (Cruel Intentions)	January 24, 2017	#TGLCruelIntentions	15.5%	
103	13	"Sulat Para Kay Gloria" (Letters to Gloria)	January 25, 2017	#TGLLettersToGloria	—N/a	—N/a
104	14	"Nagkakamaling Pagkakakilanlan" (Mistaken Identity)	January 26, 2017	#TGLMistakenIdentity	—N/a	—N/a
105	15	"Ang Hindi Nasabing Kinakatakutan" (The Untold Fear)	January 27, 2017	#TGLTheUntoldFear	14.7%	
Peter learns that Gloria didn't really love Andres and that she married him for a reason. Gloria cannot manage to tell the truth to Peter due to emotional breakdown so Peter tries to find out more in other ways.
106	16	"Sa Ilalim ng Ibabaw" (Beneath the Surface)	January 30, 2017	#TGLBeneathTheSurface	15.1%	
107	17	"Pantay na Responsibilidad" (Equal Responsibility)	January 31, 2017	#TGLEqualResponsibility	—N/a	—N/a
108	18	"Ang Legal na Tagapag-Alaga" (The Legal Guardian)	February 1, 2017	#TGLTheLegalGuardian	—N/a	—N/a
109	19	"Katuparan" (Fulfillment)	February 2, 2017	#TGLFulfillment	—N/a	—N/a
110	20	"Walang Hanggang Pagmamahal" (Infinite Love)	February 3, 2017	#TGLInfiniteLove	14.6%	
111	21	"Nawawalang Piraso" (Missing Pieces)	February 6, 2017	#TGLMissingPieces	—N/a	—N/a
112	22	"Sagupaan ng Interes" (Conflict of Interest)	February 7, 2017	#TGLConflictofInterest	—N/a	—N/a
113	23	"Gasolina at Sunog" (Fuel and Fire)	February 8, 2017	#TGLFuelAndFire	—N/a	—N/a
114	24	"Alaalang Nasusunog" (Memories Burning)	February 9, 2017	#TGLMemoriesBurning	17.2%	
The Alegre house catches fire and a disoriented Gloria recalls through the flames her bitter past with Andres.
115	25	"Ang Masakit na Katotohanan" (The Painful Truth)	February 10, 2017	#TGLThePainfulTruth	19.0%	
Peter finally learns that Andres raped Gloria.
116	26	"Ang Pagkabigla" (The Aftershock)	February 13, 2017	#TGLTheAftershock	—N/a	—N/a
Gloria passes out after hallucinating about Andres. Peter and Lydia rush her to the hospital with Gloria's children & loved ones catching up to them.
117	27	"Pagtigil ng Sunog" (Ceasefire)	February 14, 2017	#TGLCeasefire	—N/a	—N/a
118	28	"Balisa" (Restlessness)	February 15, 2017	#TGLRestlessness	15.1%	
119	29	"Pagkanulo" (Betrayal)	February 16, 2017	#TGLBetrayal	—N/a	—N/a
120	30	"Sinulid ng Pag-Asa" (String of Hope)	February 17, 2017	#TGLStringOfHope	14.8%	
121	31	"Kinabahang Sumpong" (Nervous Breakdown)	February 20, 2017	#TGLNervousBreakdown	14.2%	
122	32	"Pagbalik sa Bahay" (Way Back Home)	February 21, 2017	#TGLWayBackHome	15.1%	
123	33	"Memoryang Nabuksan" (Memory Unlocked)	February 22, 2017	#TGLMemoryUnlocked	14.7%	
124	34	"Maayos na Itinagong Sikreto" (Well-Kept Secrets)	February 23, 2017	#TGLWellKeptSecrets	—N/a	—N/a
125	35	"Bakas ng Pagkakasala" (Traces of Guilt)	February 24, 2017	#TGLTracesOfGuilt	14.9%	
126	36	"Paggising na Sandali" (Awakening Moment)	February 27, 2017	#TGLAwakeningMoment	15.4%	
127	37	"Ang Desisyon" (The Decision)	February 28, 2017	#TGLTheDecision	15.0%	
Amanda and Paeng finally give their blessing to Peter to marry Gloria.
128	38	"Ang Pag-Kumpirma" (The Confirmation)	March 1, 2017	#TGLTheConfirmation	15.5%	
129	39	"Nakuhang mga Sandali" (Captured Moments)	March 2, 2017	#TGLCapturedMoments	14.8%	
130	40	"Pag-Konekta ng mga Puso" (Connecting Hearts)	March 3, 2017	#TGLConnectingHearts	12.6%	
131	41	"Mga Paalam at Mga Kamusta" (Goodbyes and Hellos)	March 6, 2017	#TGLGoodbyesAndHellos	14.5%	
132	42	"Paglala ng Kondisyon" (Worsening Condition)	March 7, 2017	#TGLWorseningCondition	14.1%	
133	43	"Ang Tunay na Pagmamahal" (The Pure Love)	March 8, 2017	#TGLThePureLove	13.6%	
134	44	"Wag mo Akong Kalimutan" (Forget Me Not)	March 9, 2017	#TGLForgetMeNot	14.1%	
135	45	"Ang Puno ng Pamilya" (The Family Tree)	March 10, 2017	#TGLTheFamilyTree	14.1%	
Gloria's family build a family tree to help her remember them. In the process, an unexpected revelation about Amanda nearly reveals.
136	46	"Hanapin ang Katotohanan" (Seek for Truth)	March 13, 2017	#TGLSeekForTruth	14.6%	
137	47	"Ang Di Katanggap-tanggap na Katotohanan" (The Unpleasant Truth)	March 14, 2017	#TGLTheUnpleasantTruth	13.0%	
Amanda finds out that Gloria almost had her aborted when she was still in the latter's womb.
138	48	"Ang Nawawalang Koneksyon" (The Missing Link)	March 15, 2017	#TGLTheMissingLink	13.8%	
139	49	"Totoong Intesyon" (Real Intentions)	March 16, 2017	#TGLRealIntensions	13.7%	
The Alegre and Alcantara family are preparing for their family outing in Bagong Ilog. But Amanda had something else in mind.
140	50	"Pag-Uwi" (Coming Home)	March 17, 2017	#TGLComingHome	13.6%	
141	51	"Pagbalik sa Nakaraan" (Tracking The Past)	March 20, 2017	#TGLTrackingThePast	13.9%	
142	52	"Pinakadakilang Sakripisyo" (Greatest Sacrifice)	March 21, 2017	#TGLGreatestSacrifice	15.5%	
143	53	"Masakit ang Katotohanan" (Truth Hurts)	March 22, 2017	#TGLTruthHurts	14.4%	
Amanda finally learns that her very own father Andres raped Gloria, leaving her deeply distraught and remorseful. Lizelle, Andrei, and Paeng confirm the whole story through Lydia and Peter.
144	54	"Paghahanap kay Amanda" (Finding Amanda)	March 23, 2017	#TGLFindingAmanda	—N/a	—N/a
Amanda has gone missing. Gloria, Lizelle, Andrei, Paeng, and Z try their best to find out where she could have gone.
145	55	"Pag-Asa at Takot" (Hopes and Fears)	March 24, 2017	#TGLHopesAndFears	13.8%	
146	56	"Ang Araw ng Kasal" (The Wedding Day)	March 27, 2017	#TGLTheWeddingDay	16.8%	
The wedding day of Gloria and Peter has arrived. Will Amanda catch up to the occasion?
147	57	"Ang Walang Patid na Sumpa" (The Unbroken Vows)	March 28, 2017	#TGLTheUnbrokenVows	15.7%	
Gloria and Peter celebrate their wedding reception. Amanda leads her siblings in formally welcoming Peter into their family.
148	58	"Walang Katapusang Kaligayahan" (Endless Joy)	March 29, 2017	#TGLEndlessJoy	13.9%	
Gloria and Peter go to Baguio for their honeymoon. At the same time, Amanda apologizes to her siblings for everything she has done to them and they decide to start over as one whole family.
149	59	"Perpektong Araw" (The Perfect Day)	March 30, 2017	#TGLThePerfectDay	14.9%	
150	60	"Simula ng Katapusan" (Beginning of The End)	March 31, 2017	#TGLBeginningOfTheEnd	14.1%	
151	61	"Laban ng Pamilya" (Family Battle)	April 3, 2017	#TGLFamilyBattle	14.7%	
A few moments after fainting in Baguio, Gloria is revealed to be having expressive aphasia.
152	62	"Daan sa Paggaling" (Road to Recovery)	April 4, 2017	#TGLRoadToRecovery	14.1%	—N/a
153	63	"Pag-Asenso" (Moving Forward)	April 5, 2017	#TGLMovingForward	13.7%	—N/a
154	64	"Karera Laban sa Oras" (Race Against Time)	April 6, 2017	#TGLRaceAgainstTime	—N/a	—N/a
155	65	"Pag-Asa" (Daily Dose Of Hope)	April 7, 2017	#TGLDailyDoseOfHope	12.3%	—N/a
156	66	"Paglalakbay sa Pag-alala" (Journey To Remember)	April 10, 2017	#TGLJourneyToRemember	12.7%	—N/a
157	67	"Lipad ng Ala-ala" (Flight of Memory)	April 11, 2017	#TGLFlightOfMemory	12.2%	—N/a
158	68	"Ang Hubad na Katotohanan" (The Naked Truth)	April 12, 2017	#TGLTheNakedTruth	12.1%	—N/a
159	69	"Isang Matamis na Araw" (One Sweet Day)	April 17, 2017	#TGLOneSweetDay	13.0%	—N/a
160	70	"Mahal Kita, Paalam" (I Love You, Goodbye)	April 18, 2017	#TGLILoveYouGoodbye	15.1%	—N/a
Peter has died while sleeping with Gloria.
161	71	"Ang Pinakadakilang Laban" (The Greatest Battle)	April 19, 2017	#TGLTheGreatestBattle	13.6%	—N/a
Gloria begins to suffer a severe stroke; she will die soon. Amanda, Andrei, Paeng, and Lizelle pray for their mother.
162	72	"Sumalangit Nawa, Gloria" (Rest In Peace, Gloria)	April 20, 2017	#TGLRestInPeaceGloria	—N/a	—N/a
Gloria dies peacefully from a fatal stroke and her children, with heavy hearts, thank her for everything she has done for them.
163	73	"Ang Di Malilimutang Pagtatapos" (The Unforgettable Finale)	April 21, 2017	#TGLTheUnforgettableFinale	17.3%	—N/a
Gloria is laid to rest, where she is reunited with Peter in the afterlife. Years later, Gloria's family & loved ones open the Happy Mornings Home Care facility for dementia patients.
