= My Guardian Abby =

Philippine television drama series

- Genre: Drama
- Starring: Nadine Samonte
- Opening theme: "Ako sa Iyo" by Jaya
- Country of origin: Philippines
- Original language: Tagalog
- No. of episodes: 24

Production
- Camera setup: Multiple-camera setup
- Running time: 60 minutes
- Production companies: GMA Entertainment TV; Telefe

Original release
- Network: QTV
- Release: November 15, 2005 – April 25, 2006

My Guardian Abby is a Philippine television drama series broadcast by QTV. Starring Nadine Samonte in the title role, it premiered on November 15, 2005. The series concluded on April 25, 2006, with a total of 24 episodes.

== Cast and characters ==
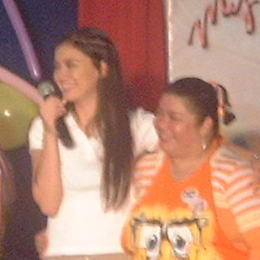
Nadine Samonte (left) portrays Pink Angel Abby.

Lead cast

- Nadine Samonte as Pink Angel Abby

Supporting cast

- Pauleen Luna as Blue Angel Elisha
- Danilo Barrios
- Benjie Paras
- Maureen Larrazabal as Lucy
- Jonalyn Viray as Guardian J
- Sheena Halili as Devi
- Margaret Nales Wilson as Badsy
