= Ria Atayde =

Filipino actress (born 1992)

- Born: Maria Sophia Campo Atayde; March 23, 1992 (age 34); Mandaluyong, Metro Manila, Philippines
- Education: Saint Pedro Poveda College; De La Salle University, (Communication Arts)
- Occupations: Actress; singer
- Years active: 2015–present
- Agent(s): Star Magic (2015–present); APT Entertainment (2020–2021); TV5 Network (2021–present); Advanced Media Broadcasting System (2024–present)
- Spouse: Zanjoe Marudo (m. 2024)
- Children: 1
- Parent(s): Art Atayde; Sylvia Sanchez
- Relatives: Arjo Atayde (brother); Coleen Garcia (cousin); Maine Mendoza (sister-in-law)

Maria "Ria" Sophia Campo Atayde-Marudo (born March 23, 1992) is a Filipino actress. She is the daughter of veteran actress Sylvia Sanchez and businessman Art Atayde. Her career began with the drama series Ningning and variety show It's Showtime.

== Early life ==
Atayde was born and raised in the Philippines. She is the daughter of Sylvia Sanchez, a veteran actress, and Half Spanish Art Atayde, a businessman. She has three siblings: Arjo, Gela, and Xavi. She is an alumna of Saint Pedro Poveda College and De La Salle University, where she took up Communication Arts for bachelors and graduated from in June 2014.

== Career ==
Her career began in 2015 when she starred in ABS-CBN's Ningning (2015–16). The series aired on the Prime Tanghali noontime show slot. Atayde played a minor role in this series as Teacher Hope, Ningning's teacher. She starred opposite of Jana Cassandra Agoncillo, Beauty Gonzalez and her mother, Sylvia Sanchez. The series aired its final episode on January 15, 2016, and concluded with a total of 125 episodes.

After her successful portrayal in Ningning, Atayde joined It's Showtime and became part of the cast during its Lenten Special week. Atayde was in the series during an episode entitled "The Wedding" and played the role of "Sheila". Shortly after, she was cast in the long running drama anthology series Maalaala Mo Kaya (2016) for the episode entitled "Puno ng Mangga". She received the award for Best Female New TV Personality for this role. Atayde then starred in an episode of Ipaglaban Mo! (2016). She then went to Wansapanataym (2016) to star in the miniseries Holly and Mau, after playing several roles of heavy drama.

After a short break, Atayde was cast in the popular fantasy television series My Dear Heart (2017), opposite Nayomi "Heart" Ramos, Coney Reyes, Zanjoe Marudo and Bela Padilla. The series received a great response and garnered 31.0% on its 2nd episode nationwide according to Kantar Media ratings. Portraying the role of Gia Divinagracia, this is Atayde's most recent dramatic return to teleseryes. The series premiered on January 23, 2017 on ABS-CBN's Primetime Bida evening block.

In 2020, she became one of the hosts of Chika, Besh! along with fellow actresses, Pauleen Luna and comedienne Pokwang, aired on TV5 through a blocktime agreement, but is still under contract with Star Magic.

== Filmography ==
=== Film ===
Year	Title	Role
2017	Can We Still Be Friends?	Cindy
2018	The Girl in the Orange Dress	Kakai
2018	The Hows of Us	Awee
2021	Love or Money	Agnes

=== Television / Digital ===
Year	Title	Role
2015–2016	Ningning	Teacher Hope Cruz
2016	Showtime Lenten Special - The Wedding	Sheila
2016	Maalaala Mo Kaya: Puno ng Mangga	Fe
2016	Ipaglaban Mo: Kapansanan	Diwata Wendy
2016	Wansapanataym: Holly and Mau	Eliza (Black sorceress)
2017	My Dear Heart	Dra. Gia Divinagracia Lana
2017	Ipaglaban Mo: Mental	Aicelle
2017	Maalaala Mo Kaya: Damit - The Hershey Hilado Story	Hershey Hilado
2017	Wansapanatym: Amazing Ving	Reyna Maxima
2018	Ipaglaban Mo: Disgrasyada	Gladys
2018	Showtime Lenten Special - Destination: Home	Ann
2018	Wansapanataym: Ofishially Yours	Merlina
2018–2019	Halik	Pinky "Baste" Sebastian
2019	High	Gabby
2019	Wansapanataym: Mr. Cutepido	Maxene
2019	Ipaglaban Mo: Gayuma	Lily
2019	Parasite Island	Janelle
2019	Manilennials	Missy
2020	Paano Kita Mapasasalamatan?	Atty. Glenda Litong
2020	Chika, Besh!	Herself / Host
2020	Fill in the Bank	Herself / Contestant
2021	Maalaala Mo Kaya: Blouse	Janice Justol
2021–2022	Viral Scandal	Lara Dizon
2022	Misis Piggy	Lani
2023	Cattleya Killer	Micah Tapales
2023–2024	Nag-aapoy na Damdamin	Melinda Avecilla-Buencamino
2024	Sellblock	
2024	Spy × Family	Millie Myers (voice)

== Awards ==
- 2016 PMPC Star Awards for TV's "Best Female New TV Personality" for MMK episode: Puno ng Mangga.
- 2016 PMPC Star Awards for TV's "Female Star of the Night (Music)"

== Personal life ==
Atayde and actor Zanjoe Marudo officially confirmed their engagement on February 20, 2024, in a joint Instagram post. On March 23, the couple were married in a civil ceremony in Quezon City officiated by Mayor Joy Belmonte. After 7 months, their child was born on September 23.

== Footnotes ==
- Mother is Sylvia Sanchez
- Younger Sister of Arjo Atayde
- Brief history
- Cousin of Coleen Garcia
