= Ningning (TV series) =

2015–16 Philippine television drama series

- Title card
- Genre: Comedy drama; Family; Slice of life
- Created by: Mel Mendoza-del Rosario
- Developed by: Ginny Monteagudo-Ocampo
- Written by: Mary Rose Colindres; Jimuel de la Cruz; Cyrus Dan Cañares; Jerry Gracio; Zoilo Barrel
- Directed by: Jeffrey R. Jeturian; Paco Sta. Maria
- Creative director: Nicolo Guzman III
- Starring: Jana Agoncillo; John Steven de Guzman; Beauty Gonzalez; Ketchup Eusebio; Sylvia Sanchez
- Opening theme: "Tupad Na Ang Pangarap" by Camille Santos
- Composer: Trina Belamide
- Country of origin: Philippines
- Original language: Filipino
- No. of episodes: 125

Production
- Executive producers: Carlo Katigbak; Cory Vidanes; Laurenti Dyogi; Ginny Monteagudo-Ocampo
- Producers: Aimee Fabian-Sumalde; Sharlene Roanne Tan; Mark Anthony Gile; Mel Mendoza-Del Rosario
- Production locations: San Vicente, Palawan; Manila
- Editor: Dennis Salgado
- Running time: 30-45 minutes Weekdays at 11:30 (PST)
- Production company: GMO Entertainment Unit

Original release
- Network: ABS-CBN
- Release: July 27, 2015 – January 15, 2016

Ningning (lit. 'Sparkle') is a Philippine television drama series broadcast by ABS-CBN. Directed by Jeffrey Jeturian, it stars Jana Agoncillo, John Steven de Guzman, Beauty Gonzalez, Ketchup Eusebio and Sylvia Sanchez. It aired on the network's Prime Tanghali line up and worldwide on TFC from July 27, 2015 to January 15, 2016, replacing Oh My G! and was replaced by Be My Lady.

== Plot ==
The series shows life through the eyes of a little girl named Ningning. Born in a secluded island called Isla Baybay, Ningning grew up living a simple life with her father Dondon, her mother Lovely, and her grandmother Mamay. As a fisherman, Dondon barely earns enough to make ends meet but the constant support and love of his family makes him feel like the richest man in the world. Through their love for each other, everyday in Ningning's life seems happy and content. As fate would have it, a strong typhoon ravished the island and destroyed the boat by which Dondon makes his living. This forced the family to leave for the city to find a better life. Although faced with many challenges in their life in the city, Ningning and her family showed that though hope, perseverance, love of family and friends, all things are achievable. Through the eyes of Ningning the world takes on an innocent perception full of beautiful relationships, second chances, forgiveness, and love.

== Cast and characters ==
=== Main cast ===
- Jana Agoncillo as Maningning "Ningning" Angeles
- Josh de Guzman as Macario "Macmac" Bautista
- Beauty Gonzalez as Lovely Sylvestre-Angeles
- Ketchup Eusebio as Adonis "Dondon" Angeles
- Sylvia Sanchez as Pacita "Mamay" Angeles

=== Supporting cast ===
- Vandolph Quizon as Joseph "Otep" Cruz
- Tanya Garcia as Alicia "Isha" Demetion-Bautista
- Nyoy Volante as Johnny Bautista
- Rommel Padilla as Crisanto "Mang Cris" Garcia
- Ria Atayde as Teacher Hope Cruz
- Mercedes Cabral as Evaporada "Eva" Herrera-Cruz
- Pooh as Jewel "J-Lo" Buenaflor
- Maris Racal as Niña Buenaflor
- Freddie Webb as Francisco "Lolo Kiko" Cruz
- Marco Gumabao as Pido Cruz
- Epifania "Direk Panying" Limon as Indang
- Vangie Labalan as Aling Candy

=== Guest cast ===
- Nonie Buencamino as Iking Sylvestre
- Aiko Climaco as Cristina Morales
- Karl Medina as Peter "Mamang Lobo" Peñalosa
- Yñigo Delen as Carlo
- Anita Linda as Lola Adelina

== Re-runs ==
It aired re-runs on Jeepney TV from May 29 to August 29, 2017; June 1 to October 12, 2019; November 14, 2022 to May 12, 2023; April 15 to July 26, 2024; and from July 21 to October 17, 2025 on both Jeepney TV and ALLTV.

== See also ==
- List of programs broadcast by ABS-CBN
- List of ABS-CBN Studios original drama series
