= Pure Love (2014 TV series) =

2014 Philippine television drama series

- Genre: Drama; Romance; Fantasy
- Created by: ABS-CBN Studios
- Based on: 49 Days by So Hyun-kyung
- Written by: Mary Rose Colindres; Ruby Leah Castro; Kay Conlu-Brondial
- Directed by: Veronica B. Velasco; Mikey del Rosario; Paco Sta. Maria
- Starring: Alex Gonzaga; Yen Santos; Joseph Marco; Matt Evans; Arjo Atayde; Arron Villaflor; Yam Concepcion; Anna Luna
- Opening theme: "Gisingin ang Puso" by Aiza Seguerra
- Country of origin: Philippines
- Original languages: Filipino; English
- No. of episodes: 93

Production
- Executive producers: Ginny Monteagudo-Ocampo; Sharlene Roanne Tan
- Producer: Mark Anthony Gile
- Production locations: Manila, Philippines
- Editors: Dennis Salgado; Kathryn Jerry Perez
- Running time: 28–31 minutes
- Production company: GMO Unit

Original release
- Network: ABS-CBN
- Release: July 7 – November 14, 2014

Related
- All of Me (2015)

Pure Love is a 2014 Philippine television drama series broadcast by ABS-CBN. The series is based on the 2011 South Korean television drama series 49 Days. Directed by Veronica B. Velasco, Mikey del Rosario and Paco Sta. Maria, it stars Alex Gonzaga, Yen Santos, Joseph Marco, Matt Evans, Arjo Atayde, Arron Villaflor, Yam Concepcion and Anna Luna. It aired on the network's Primetime Bida line up and worldwide on TFC from July 7 to November 14, 2014 replacing Mirabella and was replaced by Bagito.

== Cast and characters ==
Main cast

- Alex Gonzaga as Diane Santos
- Yen Santos as Ysabel Espiritu
- Joseph Marco as Dave Martinez, Jr.
- Matt Evans as Jake Espiritu / Scheduler
- Arjo Atayde as Raymond dela Cruz
- Arron Villaflor as Ronald Trinidad
- Yam Concepcion as Kayla Santos
- Anna Luna as Jackie Cortez

Supporting cast

- Sunshine Cruz as Lorraine Santos
- John Arcilla as Peter Santos
- Dante Ponce as Jun Bautista
- Ana Capri as Juliet
- Bart Guingona as Danny
- Shey Bustamante as Cathy
- Sue Prado as Sally
- Ricardo Cepeda as Mr. Chua
- Jason Francisco as Frank
- Sylvia Sanchez as Ramona Esguerra
- Tetchie Agbayani as Senyora

Guest cast

- Minco Fabregas as Atty. Samson
- Helga Krapf as Diane's classmate
- Michael Flores as Arnulfo Navarro
- Jacob Benedicto as Diane's classmate
- Hiyasmin Neri as Felicity
- Dionne Monsanto as Chelly
- Jed Montero as Cher
- Maila Gumila as Evangeline Martinez
- Art Acuña as Dave Martinez, Sr.
- Nonie Buencamino as Jake's Scheduler
- Miko Raval as Steve
- Gilleth Sandico as spiritualist
- Menggie Cobarrubias as Dr. James Young

== Soundtrack ==
- "Gisingin ang Puso" by Aiza Seguerra
- "Magkabilang Mundo" by Maki Ricafort
- "Sundo" by Johnoy Danao

== Re-runs ==
The show aired re-runs on Jeepney TV from February 13 to April 24, 2017 (replacing the re-runs of Good Doctor); February 11 to April 12, 2019 (replacing the re-runs of Apoy sa Dagat); and January 18 to May 21, 2021 (replacing the re-runs of Forevermore).

== Reception ==
Kantar Media National TV Ratings (5:45 p.m. PST)
Pilot episode	Finale episode	Peak	Average	Source
19.5%	29.2%	29.2%	22.0%	
