= Chika, Besh! =

2020–21 Philippine defunct morning talk show

- Also known as: Chika, BESH! Basta Everyday Super Happy! Rise and Shine (original working title)
- Genre: Talk show Morning show
- Created by: Archangel Media
- Developed by: Cignal Entertainment
- Written by: Clarence Jovito; Michelle Ann Ngu; Francis Cyril Ramos
- Directed by: Jeannie Gualberto
- Presented by: Ria Atayde; Pauleen Luna-Sotto; Pokwang
- Country of origin: Philippines
- Original language: Filipino
- No. of episodes: 101

Production
- Executive producers: Robert P. Galang; Sienna G. Olaso; Isabel A. Santillan
- Producers: Michael B. Tuviera; Jojo C. Oconer; Jacqui L. Cara; Perci M. Intalan; Vitto P. Lazatin; Guido R. Zaballero
- Production locations: TV5 Media Center, Mandaluyong, Metro Manila, Philippines
- Camera setup: Multiple-camera setup
- Running time: 60 minutes (with commercials)
- Production companies: Archangel Media; Cignal Entertainment

Original release
- Network: TV5; Colours
- Release: August 17, 2020 – January 8, 2021

Chika, Besh! (stylized as Chika, BESH! Basta Everyday Super Happy!) is a Philippine morning talk show broadcast by TV5, presented by Ria Atayde, Pauleen Luna, and Pokwang which premiered on August 17, 2020. The show aired through Mondays to Fridays as part of the network's morning programming block at 7:30 AM. It is line produced by Archangel Media, alongside game shows Fill in the Bank and Bawal Na Game Show. The Cignal subscription channel Colours airs an encore presentation of the show as part of its daily lineup following the premiere network telecast at 11:00 am.

== Final hosts ==
- Ria Atayde
- Pauleen Luna-Sotto
- Pokwang

== Final segments ==
- Besh Tips - Tried-and-tested tips and tricks introduced by the main hosts.
- Laps Trip with Christian Antolin - A cooking segment featuring local and international delicacies.
- Patikim Patakam - A cooking segment with the main hosts.
- Share Ko Lang with Richo Bautista - The popular social media personality presents viral videos of the day.
- Tatak Pinoy with Malaya Macaraeg - A remote segment where local businesses get to have their popular products put under the spotlight.
- Virtual Gala with Kimpoy Feliciano (New Zealand), Bangs Garcia (United Kingdom), Shine Kuk (South Korea), and Taki Saito (Japan) - Celebrity correspondents keep the viewers updated on the happenings in their various countries abroad.
- Words of Wisdom - Heartfelt messages of the hosts that are sure to inspire the viewing public.

== Production ==
The show ended prematurely on January 8, 2021, due to the failure of contract renewal and Ria Atayde transferring back to her home network, ABS-CBN.

== See also ==
- List of TV5 (Philippine TV network) original programming
- Kapatid Channel
- Magandang Buhay
