= Sellblock =

- Genre: Crime drama
- Directed by: Pedring Lopez
- Starring: Jericho Rosales; Empoy Marquez; Ronnie Lazaro; Mon Confiado; Sylvia Sanchez; Ria Atayde; Jaclyn Jose
- Country of origin: Philippines
- Original language: Tagalog

Production
- Camera setup: Single-camera
- Production company: BlackOps Studios Asia

Sellblock is an upcoming Philippine crime drama television series, produced by BlackOps Studios Asia and directed by Pedring Lopez. It stars Jericho Rosales, Empoy Marquez, Ronnie Lazaro, Mon Confiado, Sylvia Sanchez, Ria Atayde, and Jaclyn Jose.

The first season will consist of 8 episodes and will have a second and third season coming soon.

== Cast ==
- Jericho Rosales as Cenon Santiago
- Empoy Marquez
- Ronnie Lazaro
- Mon Confiado
- Sylvia Sanchez
- Ria Atayde
- Jaclyn Jose

== Production ==
In February 2022, it was announced that the prison-crime series Sellblock was in pre-production and was set to be produced by BlackOps Studios Asia, Psyops8, and ABS-CBN, with Pedring Lopez on board to direct and produce the series. In March 2022, Jericho Rosales was cast to lead the series, along with others including Tirso Cruz III, Cherry Pie Picache, Ronnie Lazaro, Rosanna Roces, Mon Confiado, and RK Bagatsing. In March 2023, producer Scott M. Rosenfelt came on board to produce the eight episodes of the first season, while Blue Fox Entertainment was announced to be handling the sales and distribution. More cast members were revealed which included Empoy Marquez, Ronnie Lazaro, Mon Confiado, Sylvia Sanchez, and Ria Atayde.

ABS-CBN was previously set to produce, but they left the series.

=== Filming ===
The principal photography on the series began in May 2023 as its lead, Rosales, revealed about his character, Cenon Santiago. Filming ended in April 2024.

== Distribution ==
Blue Fox Entertainment is handling the worldwide sales of the series, and it would run on MIPTV.
