= The Greatest Love (Philippine TV series) =

2016–17 Philippine television drama series

- Title card
- Genre: Romance; Melodrama; Family
- Developed by: Ginny Monteagudo-Ocampo
- Written by: Ruby Leah Castro-Villanueva; Jerry Gracio; Jaja Amarillo; Alpha Fortun; Carlo Katigbak
- Directed by: Jeffrey R. Jeturian; Mervyn B. Brondial; Dado C. Lumibao; Paco A. Sta. Maria
- Creative director: Ricky Lee
- Starring: Sylvia Sanchez; Nonie Buencamino; Andi Eigenmann; Dimples Romana; Arron Villaflor; Matt Evans; Joshua Garcia
- Opening theme: "The Greatest Love of All" by Sharon Cuneta
- Composers: Michael Masser; Linda Creed
- Country of origin: Philippines
- Original languages: Filipino; English
- No. of episodes: 163 (list of episodes)

Production
- Executive producers: Carlo Katigbak; Cory Vidanes; Laurenti Dyogi; Ginny Monteagudo-Ocampo
- Producers: Mark Anthony D. Gile; Marielle De Guzman-Navarro; Edyl Macy Delos Santos
- Production locations: Manila, Philippines; Cabarroguis, Quirino; San Miguel, Bulacan
- Cinematography: Neil Daza; Rain Yamson
- Editor: Joy Buenaventura
- Running time: 30-45 minutes
- Production company: GMO Entertainment Unit

Original release
- Network: ABS-CBN
- Release: September 5, 2016 – April 21, 2017

The Greatest Love is a Philippine television drama melodrama series broadcast by ABS-CBN. Directed by Dado C. Lumibao, Jeffrey R. Jeturian, Mervyn B. Brondial and Paco A. Sta. Maria, it stars Sylvia Sanchez, Nonie Buencamino, Andi Eigenmann, Dimples Romana, Arron Villaflor, Matt Evans, Joshua Garcia, and Ruby Ruiz. It aired on the network's Kapamilya Gold line up and worldwide on TFC from September 5, 2016, to April 21, 2017.

The program marks the reunion of Ellen Adarna and Ejay Falcon who were among the lead stars of Pasión de Amor, a Filipino version of Pasión de Gavilanes, aired on ABS-CBN.

== Series overview ==
=== Premise ===
The Greatest Love begins with aspiring photographer Gloria (Ellen Adarna) and her love story with a boatman named Peter (Ejay Falcon). Despite the fact that they love each other, Gloria is forced under duress by her father to marry Andres Alegre (Junjun Quintana), the town mayor's nephew who raped her.

Through the years, Gloria (Sylvia Sanchez) is a loving and selfless mother to Amanda (Dimples Romana), Andrei (Matt Evans), Paeng (Arron Villaflor), and Lizelle (Andi Eigenmann). To her children's perception, their father is a hard working OFW who visits from time to time. They live in the Alegre ancestral family home. Andres does not remit funds regularly so Gloria compensates by collecting, buying and selling junk. When their father comes to visit, they are a picture of a happy family.

At the root of their family's problems are her children's misconceptions that their mother was unfaithful to their father, the late Andres. Gloria refuses to sully their memory of their father, so she never admits to them that she was raped by Andres.

The breaking point is when they discover that Lizelle is an illegitimate child, the result of Peter and Gloria's illicit love affair, when Andres abandons them.

This long-kept secret shatters their happy family, and Gloria's children leave her one by one. As Gloria struggles to keep her family together, she starts to show symptoms of dementia and begins to lose pieces of her memory. She initially brushes off the symptoms until she is finally diagnosed with Alzheimer's disease.

As her illness progresses, Gloria attempts to bring back the love her family once had for each other; however, it becomes more difficult as she races against time while trying to gather her memories before they are completely wiped out. Peter (Nonie Buencamino) returns to Gloria's life and together they try to mend her children's relationship with her and each other.

== Cast and characters ==
=== Main cast ===
Cast	Character	Character Information
Sylvia Sanchez	Gloria A. Guerrero-Alegre / Gloria A. Guerrero-Alcantara†	A selfless mother to her four children, always prioritizing them and their feelings before her own. She is joyful and always has a positive outlook on life with her motto There is money in the trash. She runs a profitable junk shop, and helps lead a Zumba-Chi class in her free time. Her dream is to have a plot of land for a vacation house in her home province of Bagong Ilog. Gloria is diagnosed with Alzheimer's disease, and the symptoms of her illness cause her trouble throughout the series. She passes away after a second but severe stroke. Gloria's family open the Happy Mornings Home Care Facility in her honor.
Nonie Buencamino	Pedro "Peter" Alcantara†	Vice chairman of Nuevo Rio Constructions, named after his home province of Bagong Ilog. He is Gloria's one true love and Lizelle's biological father. After losing connection with Gloria years ago, he becomes a successful businessman. Peter then returns to her life; at first he is angry because he thought Gloria betrayed and manipulated him, but after confirming he is Lizelle's father he is determined to make up for all the lost time they missed. He wants to marry Gloria, but the Alegre siblings object because they believe he is the cause of their broken family. Undeterred, Peter waits until the Alegre siblings finally accept him. They marry towards the end of the series. He dies in his sleep due to a brain tumor, and Gloria later reunites with him in heaven.
Andi Eigenmann	Lizelle G. Alegre / Lizelle G. Alcantara-Sobrevista	Gloria's youngest child who helps her mother at their family junk shop. Lizelle has a degree in accounting, and is the fruit of Gloria and Peter's illicit love. She had seen Peter before in her childhood, and believed he is her biological father. Lizelle meets Peter again after the latter saves her from getting hit by a car. In order to further strengthen his bond with his daughter, Peter has Lizelle's last name changed to his, and provides everything possible for her to live comfortably while she works at his company. After taking over as OIC at Nuevo Rio, Lizelle becomes the financial officer for Happy Mornings.
Dimples Romana	Amanda G. Alegre-Cruz	Gloria's first child. She is a successful marketing executive, a good wife to her husband Chad, and a responsible mother to her son Z. Amanda is mad at Gloria when she learned of her mother's past liaison with Peter, and thus despises Lizelle for being their illegitimate child. When she finds out that Gloria has Alzheimer's disease, and the truth about her parents’ relationship, she gradually tries to repair her relationship with her mother and siblings. Years after Gloria's passing, Amanda becomes the manager of her family's new business: the Happy Mornings Home Care Facility for dementia patients.
Arron Villaflor	Rafael "Paeng" G. Alegre	The third of Gloria's four children. An aspiring indie rock singer, inheriting his love for music from his father, Andres. Paeng was the first of the siblings to find out about Gloria's illness, albeit unintentionally. Despite his guilt and worry for his mother, however, he uses the sickness to his advantage and steals money from her to sustain his gambling and alcohol addiction. Like Amanda, he is bitter towards Lizelle and blames her for ruining their family. Paeng eventually goes back to college, and later is the music therapist for Happy Mornings.
Matt Evans	Andres "Andrei" G. Alegre Jr.	A makeup artist and Gloria's second child. He is the only one out of the Alegre siblings who defends Lizelle despite not having the same father. Andrei is the peacemaker of the Alegre siblings and does what he can to prevent conflict in the family, but his patience eventually reaches its limit. Gloria knew that Andrei was gay during his childhood, and assured that she has always loved him for who he was ever since. Andrei is head of the wellness program at Happy Mornings.
Joshua Garcia	Zosimo "Z" A. Cruz	A senior in high school, Amanda and Chad's son, and Gloria's grandson. He learns of Gloria's disease, her love story with Peter, and how she was raped by his grandfather Andres. Z helps his Mommyla (mommy + lola) retain her memories by taking photos and filming videos of her daily life, which also documented the deteriorating effects of her illness. Years after Gloria dies of a severe stroke, he becomes a neurologist supporting Happy Mornings.
Ruby Ruiz	Lydia Balane-Thompson	Gloria's best friend since their young adult years. She is a mother figure to Gloria's children, especially to Paeng as his godmother. Lydia helps Gloria navigate with her sickness, as well as with her family's problems. She is the only one who knows Gloria's darkest secret of being raped by Andres, and that Amanda was almost aborted. After Gloria reveals the whole truth to Amanda and Lizelle, Lydia also does so to Andrei and Paeng.

=== Supporting cast ===
Cast	Character	Character Information
Tetchie Agbayani	Ma. Estella "Stella" Alegre-Policarpio	Andres’ cousin, and Amanda, Andrei, and Paeng's aunt. Did not accept Lizelle because she knew that she is not Andres’ biological daughter. She will do everything to destroy Gloria's name and reputation. Stella pretends to ask forgiveness from Gloria in order to pursue her evil plans.
Luis Alandy	Richard "Chad" Cruz	An English teacher, Amanda's husband, and Z's father. Chad particularly despises Alvin for jeopardizing his wife's career. Prior to Z's high school graduation, he traveled to work in Beijing to augment for his family's needs, especially Z's college tuition.
Bobby Andrews	Alvin Sales	Amanda's friend and co-worker at Idea Shop who harbors feelings for her. After their company loses out on their sponsorship with Builder's Home which resulted in Amanda getting terminated and Alvin resigning, they start their own marketing agency.
Mercedes Cabral	Greta Ramirez	Amanda's co-worker at Idea Shop who attempted to take credit for a campaign project from Amanda, and is keen on creating conflict with her, going as far as conspiring with someone to commit online defamation. She later reconciles with Amanda and goes to work at Amanda and Alvin's new agency.
Guji Lorenzana	Gerald Samonte	Lizelle's ex-fiancé who supported her search for her biological father. Gerald is embarrassed to show his mother how the Alegre family behaves, knowing his mother is judgmental. After he learns the truth about Lizelle's real father, he belittles her and the marriage is broken off.
Alex Medina	Alexander "Sandro" Sobrevista	A worker at the Alegre Junk Shop who has a crush on Lizelle. Sandro and the rest of the team at the junk shop support Gloria on her endeavors to bring her family back together. He later marries Lizelle and they have a daughter named Sunny.
Kira Balinger	Waywaya "Y" Soledad	The one who taught Z not to easily trust people upon meeting them for the first time. She helps Z with his project for his grandmother Gloria. Y eventually lands a job at Ken's coffee shop in order to support herself and her mother. Later on becomes a close friend and girlfriend to Z. Years after Gloria's death, she becomes the head nurse at Happy Mornings.
Micah Muñoz	Ken	Andrei's boyfriend. Runs the coffee shop that Y and Z work at part time.
Ynez Veneracion	Isabel	One of Gloria's best friends.
Elaine Quemuel	Azon	Gloria's friend and a Zumba-Chi dancer.
Edith Tagle	Melba Dela Torre	The Alegre household's helper who supports Gloria throughout the obstacles of her illness. She is eventually licensed as Gloria's certified personal caregiver until the former's passing, and becomes the head caregiver of Happy Mornings.
Kokoy de Santos	Luis	Z's schoolmate and friend.
Akira Morishita	Eric	Z's schoolmate and friend.
Nor Domingo	Jomar	Peter's right-hand man and friend.
Martha Comia	Bangs	One of Gloria's workers at the junk shop.
Acey Aguilar	Tigs	One of Gloria's workers at the junk shop.
Kych Minemoto	Pogs	One of Gloria's workers at the junk shop.

=== Special participation ===
Cast	Character	Character Information
Ellen Adarna	young Gloria	Zosimo's daughter, Peter's sweetheart and girlfriend. She has a passion for photography and business, and helps her father run his photo studio. Gloria and Peter planned to get married, but she was ultimately forced into an unhappy marriage with Andres who raped & impregnated her while Peter was in Saudi Arabia.
Ejay Falcon	young Peter	A boatman and Gloria's boyfriend. He works overseas to save for his future with Gloria. They planned to get married but Gloria got impregnated by Andres. He is heartbroken when he returns from Saudi Arabia on Gloria and Andres' wedding day, unaware of the truth behind the rushed wedding. One night, he and Gloria admit that they still have feelings for each other, resulting in Lizelle.
Tonton Gutierrez	Zosimo Guerrero†	A photographer & Gloria's father whom Z is named after. He advises Peter to prove how much he loves Gloria, and eventually accepts him after realizing he is the source of his daughter's happiness. He falls ill to liver cirrhosis during the time Gloria met with Peter again.
Rommel Padilla	Andres P. Alegre†	Gloria's late first husband, father of Amanda, Paeng, and Andrei, and Lizelle's step-father. Stopped Gloria from telling the children about Lizelle's actual father. He was killed when he saved Lizelle from an accident. The Alegre siblings later on blame Lizelle for his death after finding out she has a different father.
Junjun Quintana	young Andres	The nephew of the mayor of Bagong Ilog. Andres pursued Gloria, knowing that she was in love with Peter. Andres was first attracted to Gloria because of her beauty, but then fell for her even more for her character. Gloria kept rejecting him so he decided to rape her, resulting in Amanda. He later bore two more children, Andrei and Paeng. When Andres found out that Gloria has an illegitimate child with Peter, he became outraged but chose to love and raise Lizelle as his own in order to keep Gloria from leaving him.
Regine Angeles	Belle	A woman in Bagong Ilog who had a crush on Peter.
Kate Alejandrino	Joy	An architect that Gloria consulted for the house that she wants to build.
Aleck Bovick	Thelma Alcantara	Peter's mother. Did not agree with Peter and Gloria's love for each other, but later accepted them because it is what makes Peter happy.
Richard Quan	Eulalio Dalipe	Andres' uncle and mayor of Bagong Ilog who officiated the civil wedding of Gloria and his nephew.
Claire Ruiz	Sheila	An assistant music therapist & Paeng's ex-girlfriend.
Maila Gumila	Melissa Samonte	Gerald's mother who does not approve of Lizelle because she is an illegitimate child. She tries to destroy the Alegre name on social media.
Jong Cuenco	Mr. Samonte	Gerald's father.

- Jana Agoncillo as Leklek
- Marnie Lapuz as Adela Sunico
- Allan Paule as Samuel
- Kamille Filoteo as Liza Alcantara
- Lance Lucido as Buboy
- Mara Lopez as young Stella
- Anna Luna as young Lydia
- Anne Feo as Manuella Alonzo-Guerrero
- Ashley Sarmiento as Gloria, age 10
- Francine Diaz as adolescent Gloria
- Jane Oineza as young adult Amanda
- Teejay Marquez as young adult Andrei
- John Manalo as young adult Paeng
- Hannah Lopez Vito as young Lizelle
- Michelle Vito as teen Amanda
- Nathaniel Britt as teen Andrei
- Luke Alford as teen Paeng
- Juvylyn Bison as young Amanda
- Angeluo Alayon as young Andrei
- Raikko Mateo as young Paeng

== Reception ==
Kantar Media National TV Ratings (4:15PM PST)
Pilot Episode	Finale Episode	Peak	Average
15.7% September 5, 2016	17.3% April 21, 2017	20.4% January 11, 2017	TBD

== Production ==
=== Timeslot and premiere ===
The Greatest Love was reported to replace the soon-to-be concluded My Super D on July 18, 2016, but was postponed (and moved to later date) because of Pinoy Big Brother: Mga Kwento ng Dream Team ni Kuya. The network released several teasers of the show and announced a premiere date which is on September 5, 2016. A full-length trailer was released on August 27, 2016.

== Re-runs ==
The show aired re-runs on Jeepney TV from October 1, 2018 to January 25, 2019; October 19, 2019 to March 21, 2020; September 21, 2020 to January 29, 2021; July 17, 2023 to February 23, 2024; and July 28, 2025 to November 14, 2025 (also aired on ALLTV).

== See also ==
- List of programs broadcast by ABS-CBN
- List of ABS-CBN Studios original drama series
- List of programs broadcast by Jeepney TV
