= Iglot (TV series) =

2011 Philippine television drama series

- Title card
- Genre: Fantasy drama
- Written by: Tina Samson Velasco; Des Garbes Severino; Luningning Interio Ribay
- Directed by: Gil Tejada Jr.
- Starring: Milkach Wynne Nacion
- Opening theme: "Smile" by Regine Velasquez
- Country of origin: Philippines
- Original language: Tagalog
- No. of episodes: 55

Production
- Executive producer: Me-Ann P. Regala
- Production locations: Arayat, Pampanga
- Camera setup: Multiple-camera setup
- Running time: 18–33 minutes
- Production company: GMA Entertainment TV

Original release
- Network: GMA Network
- Release: August 29 – November 11, 2011

Related
- Mulawin

Iglot is a 2011 Philippine television drama fantasy series broadcast by GMA Network. The series is a spin-off of the Philippine television series Mulawin. Directed by Gil Tejada Jr., it stars Milkcah Wynne Nacion. It premiered on August 29, 2011 on the network's Telebabad line up. The series concluded on November 11, 2011, with a total of 55 episodes.

The series is streaming online on YouTube.

== Cast and characters ==
Cast

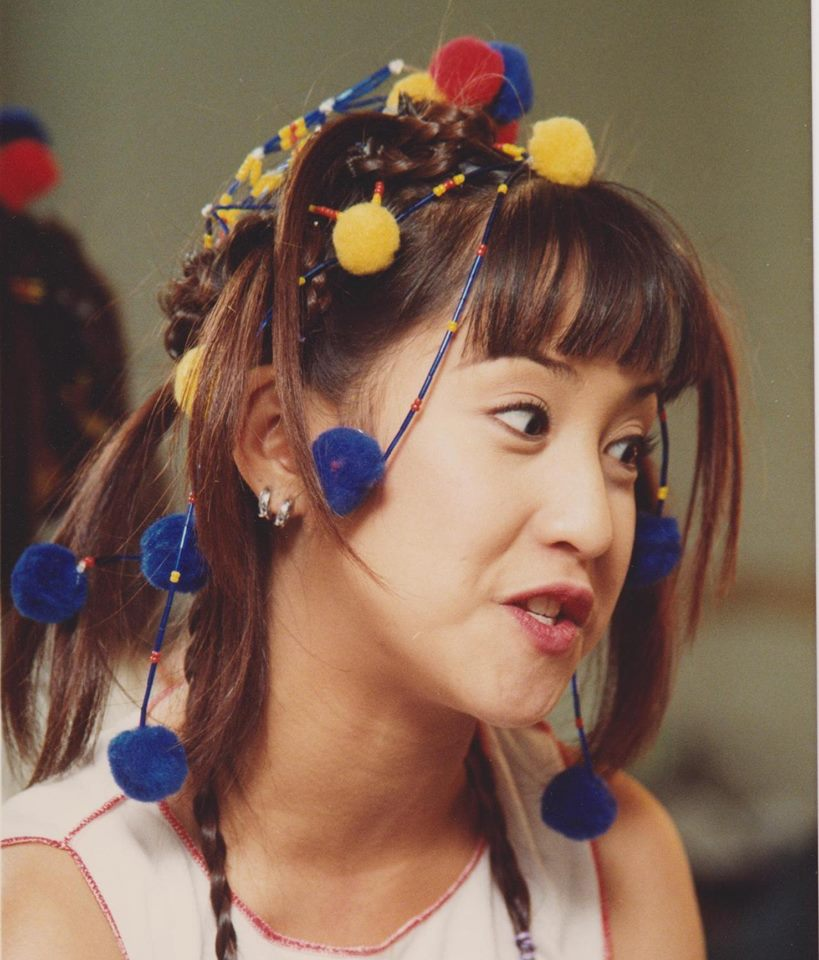
Jolina Magdangal

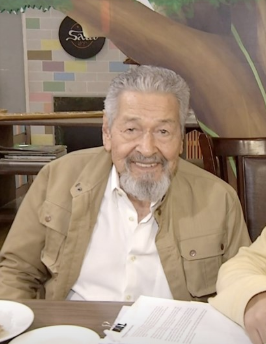
Eddie Garcia

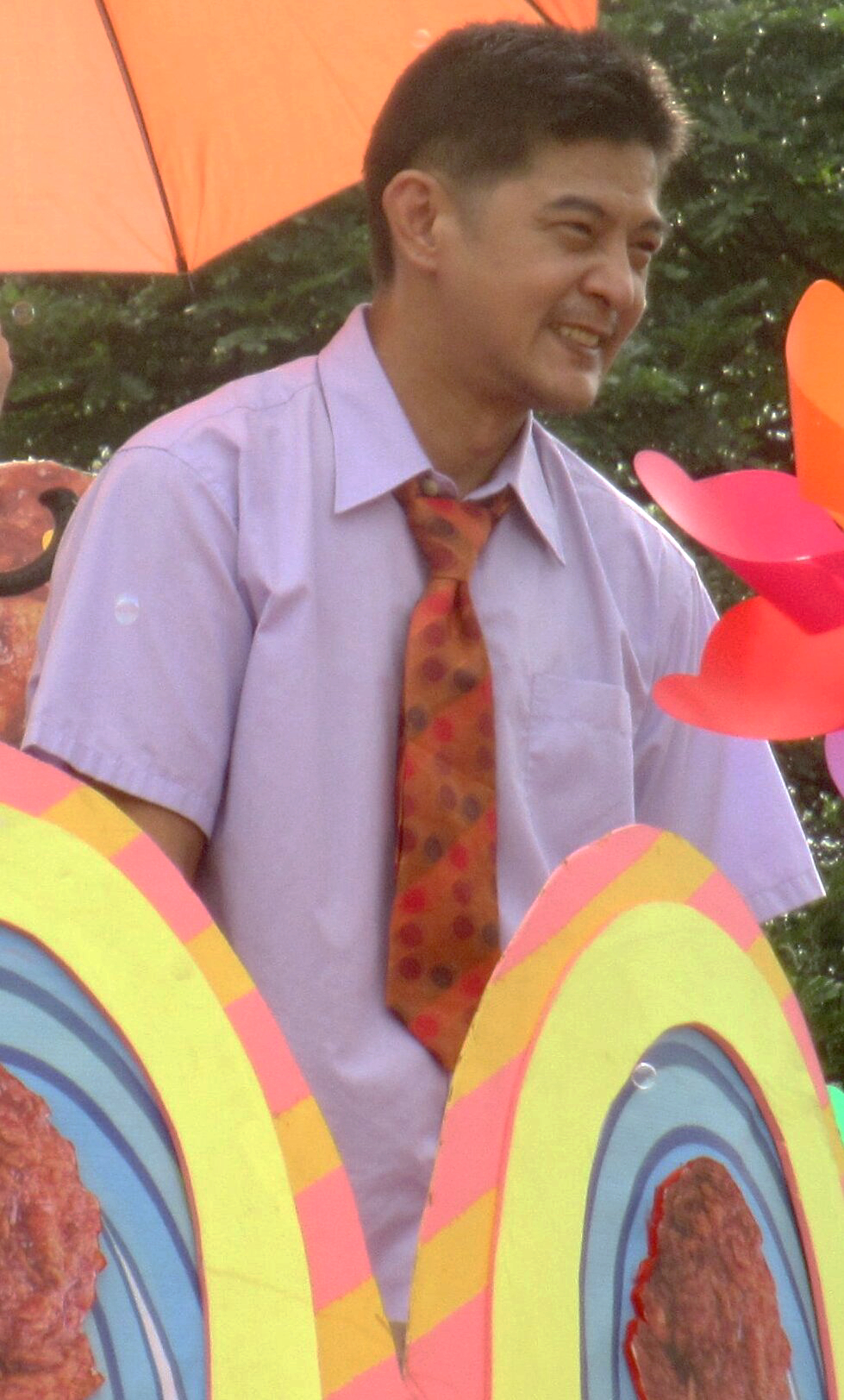
Romnick Sarmenta

Lead cast

- Milkcah Wynne Nacion as Luningning "Ning" / Isabella D. Marco

Supporting cast

- Claudine Barretto as Mariella Dacera-Rivera
- Marvin Agustin as Anton Marco
- Jolina Magdangal as Ramona Sebastian / Ramona Salvador-Marco
- Luis Alandy as Juancho Rivera
- Pauleen Luna as Vesta Santana
- Patrick Garcia as Aldo
- Noel Urbano as the voice / puppeteer of "Iglot"
- Eddie Garcia as Celso Samar
- Lexi Fernandez as Danielle
- Hiro Peralta as Luis Bustamante
- Celia Rodriguez as Idang Salvador
- Jaime Fabregas as Petrovsky
- Mel Martinez as Rica
- Perla Bautista as Ester
- Sylvia Sanchez as Betty
- Romnick Sarmenta as Ruben
- Nicky Castro as Bal
- Veyda Inoval as Jona

Guest cast

- Bianca King as Aviona
- Richard Quan as Gardo
- Sheree Bautista as Gardo's wife
- Louise delos Reyes as Hannah Dacera
- Shermaine Santiago as younger Idang
- Angeli Nicole Sanoy
- Jao Mapa as a mall officer
- Alvin Aragon as Nomer
- Zyrael Jestre as Chubby Palaboy
- Veyda Inoval

== Production ==
Principal photography commenced on July 25, 2011, in Arayat, Pampanga.

== Ratings ==
According to AGB Nielsen Philippines' Mega Manila People/Individual television ratings, the pilot episode of Iglot earned a 12.6% rating. The final episode scored a 25.6% rating in Mega Manila household television ratings.
