= Pauleen Luna =

Filipino actress (born 1988)

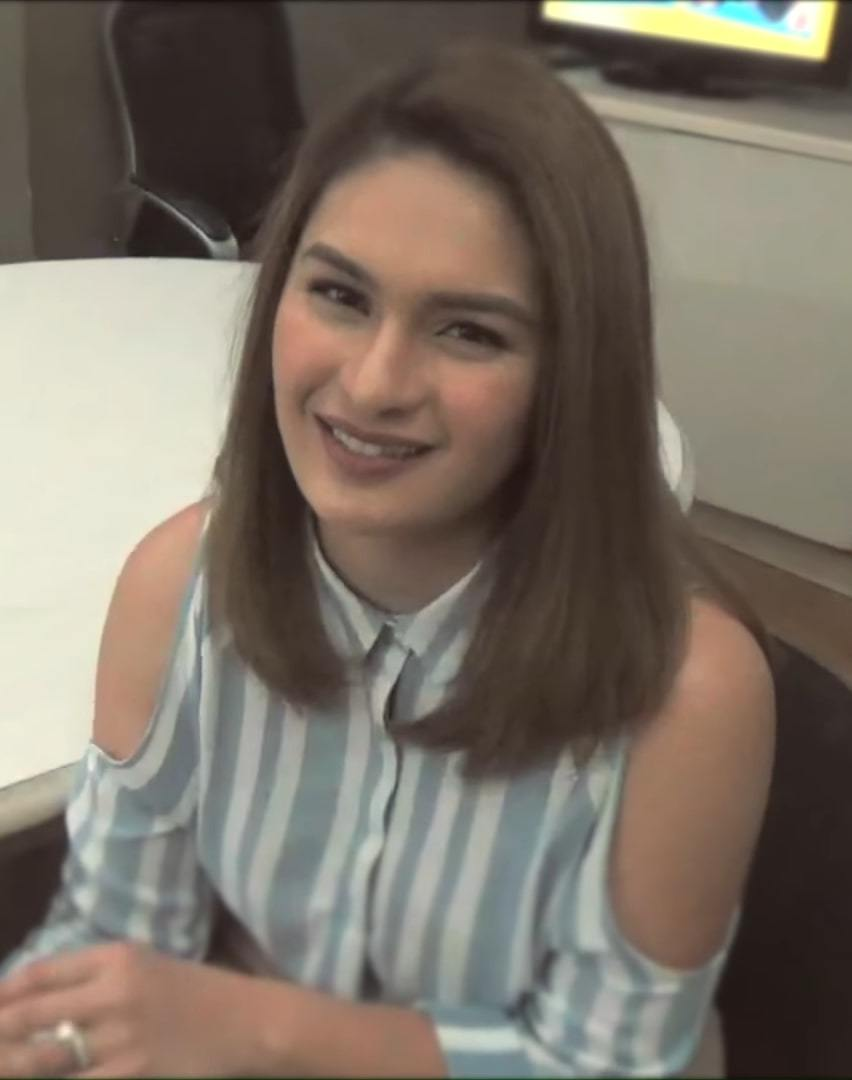
- Luna in 2017
- Born: Marie Pauleen Javier Luna; November 10, 1988 (age 37); Las Piñas, Metro Manila, Philippines
- Other name: Poleng
- Occupations: Actress; television host
- Years active: 1995–present
- Agents: Star Magic; APT Entertainment
- Spouse: Vic Sotto (m. 2016)
- Children: 2
- Relatives: Sotto family; Randy Santiago (uncle); Raymart Santiago (uncle); Rowell Santiago (uncle)

Marie Pauleen Javier Luna-Sotto (born November 10, 1988) is a Filipino actress and television host. She is married to Vic Sotto and has been a regular host of the long-running Philippine noontime variety show Eat Bulaga! since 2005, where she portrays the childlike character Baby Poleng.

== Career ==
Luna joined the Little Miss Philippines segment of Eat Bulaga! in 1995 but did not advance to the grand finals, as she was eliminated during the daily rounds. In 2002, she began her career as a teen actress after joining ABS-CBN's Star Magic. Following her introduction in the youth-oriented series Berks, she secured a major role in the primetime series Marina alongside Claudine Barretto in 2004. In 2005, she also appeared in the sitcom Bora and the reality love-team search Qpids.

After her elimination from Qpids, which aired on a Sunday, Luna transferred to GMA Network the following day and became one of the co-hosts of Eat Bulaga!. While hosting Eat Bulaga!, she was given prominent roles within the network, including a supporting role in the afternoon series Now and Forever: Agos (2005–2006) and a part in the primetime series Etheria: Ang Ikalimang Kaharian ng Encantadia (2005–2006). She also appeared in the QTV weekly series My Guardian Abby (2005–2006) with Nadine Samonte. Luna portrays Honey Toledo-Ferrer in the Philippine afternoon television series Trudis Liit (2010).

In 2020, Luna transferred to TV5 and co-hosted Chika, Besh! alongside Pokwang and Ria Atayde until the program concluded in 2021.

== Personal life ==
Luna is a niece of actors Rowell Santiago, Randy Santiago and Raymart Santiago. But she chose to have her own identity in the industry, opting not to use her connection to them.

By December 2011, Luna had begun dating her Eat Bulaga! co-host Vic Sotto after co-starring in Enteng ng Ina Mo, which he only confirmed in 2013. In September 2015, Sotto confirmed his engagement to Luna. The couple married on January 30, 2016, at Saint James the Great Parish Church, in Ayala Alabang, Muntinlupa. On May 6, 2017, Sotto announced on Eat Bulaga! that he and Luna were expecting their first child together. On November 6, Vic Sotto announced on Eat Bulaga! that Pauleen had given birth to a girl, Talitha “Tali” Maria Luna. On January 23, 2024, Thia " Mochi" Marceline was born.

== Filmography ==
=== Film ===
Year	Title	Role
2003	My First Romance	Sharri
2004	Volta	Penny Magtoto
2006	Blue Moon	Azon
2006	White Lady	Pearl Legazpi
2006	Zsazsa Zaturnnah Ze Moveeh	Aruba
2007	My Kuya's Wedding	Heidi
2007	Shake, Rattle and Roll 9	Florence
2008	Iskul Bukol 20 Years After (Ungasis and Escaleras Adventure)	Patty
2010	Sigwa	Sita
2010	Si Agimat at si Enteng Kabisote	Faye Kabisote
2011	Enteng Ng Ina Mo	Faye Kabisote / waitress
2012	Si Agimat, si Enteng Kabisote at si Ako	Faye Kabisote
2013	Gaydar	Tina
2015	My Bebe Love	Cameo Role
2016	Enteng Kabisote 10 and the Abangers	Faye
2018	Jack Em Popoy: The Puliscredibles	Herself

=== Television ===
Year	Title	Role
2002–2004	Berks	Kate
2003–2004	Basta't Kasama Kita	Karina
2004	Marina	Isabel
2005	Bora: The Sons of Beach	Paulette
2005	Qpids	Herself
2005–present	Eat Bulaga!	Co-host
2005–2006	Now and Forever: Agos	Clarissa / Cristina
2005–2006	My Guardian Abby	Blue Angel Elisha
2005–2006	Etheria: Ang Ikalimang Kaharian ng Encantadia	Odessa
2006	Encantadia: Pag-ibig Hanggang Wakas	Odessa
2006	Hongkong Flight 143	Trina
2006	Pinakamamahal	Nanette Casayuran
2007	Mobile Sheriff Jiban	Hiroko Katagiri (voice)
2007–2008	Zaido: Pulis Pangkalawakan	Lyvia
2008	Ako si Kim Samsoon	Cherry Fuentebella
2008–2009	Luna Mystika	Adita
2009	Adik Sa'Yo	Camille Sickat
2009–2010	Ikaw Sana	Sofia Reyes / Sofia Montemayor-Olivarez / Antonia Sanchez
2010	Sine Novela: Trudis Liit	Honey Toledo-Ferrer
2011	Dwarfina	Gwendina
2011	Magic Palayok	Gloomera
2011	Iglot	Vesta Santana
2012	My Daddy Dearest	Winnie / Annie / Minnie / Ada / Dalilang / Various Pixie Characters
2012–2013	Magdalena: Anghel sa Putikan	Carol Fuentebella
2013	Unforgettable	Constance "Connie" De Ocampo†
2013	Magpakailanman: Kasalanan Ba ang Umibig	Myrna Rivas
2013	Genesis	Young Sandra Sebastian-Trinidad
2014	The Borrowed Wife	Tessa Pelaez-Santos
2014	My Destiny	Janine
2015	Eat Bulaga Lenten Special: Pangako ng Pag-ibig	Rose
2015	The Rich Man's Daughter	Pearl Sy-Tanchingco
2015	Dangwa	Jenny
2016–2017	Hay, Bahay!	Poleng Poryo
2016	Magpakailanman: Silang Mga Umibig At Nasaktan	Ruby Mhel Julian Morales
2020–2021	Chika, Besh!	Herself (host)
2020	Daddy's Gurl	Amanda
2023–2024	E.A.T...	Co-host

=== Concert ===
Year	Concert title	Role	Location
2015	Tamang Panahon: Concert	young Lola Nidora	Philippine Arena

== Awards and recognitions ==
Year	Award	Category	Nominated work	Result	Ref.
2004	PMPC Star Awards for Television	Best New Female TV Personality	Marina	Won	
2006	FHM Philippines	100 Sexiest Women	None	Rank # 9	
2007	FHM Philippines	100 Sexiest Women	None	Rank # 13	
2007	PMPC Star Awards for Television	Best Single Performance By An Actress	Magpakailanman	Won	
2008	FHM Philippines	100 Sexiest Women	None	Rank # 26	
2009	FHM Philippines	100 Sexiest Women	None	Rank # 10	
2009	PEP Forum Awards	Highly Recommended on Most Promising StarNone	None	Won	
2010	FHM Philippines	100 Sexiest Women	None	Rank # 28	
2011	FHM Philippines	100 Sexiest Women	None	Rank # 40	
2012	FHM Philippines	100 Sexiest Women	None	Rank # 50	
2014	Dabarkads Awards	Best Actress	Anyo Ng Pag-Ibig	Nominated	
