= All of Me (TV series) =

2015–16 Philippine television drama series

- Title card
- Genre: Drama; Romance; Fantasy
- Created by: Willy Laconsay
- Developed by: Raymund G. Dizon
- Written by: Willy Laconsay; Melchor F. Escarcha
- Directed by: Dondon S. Santos
- Creative director: Johnny delos Santos
- Starring: Albert Martinez; JM de Guzman; Yen Santos; Arron Villaflor
- Narrated by: Albert Martinez as Dr. Manuel Figueras
- Opening theme: "All of Me" by JM de Guzman
- Composers: John Legend; Toby Gad
- Country of origin: Philippines
- Original language: Tagalog
- No. of episodes: 110

Production
- Executive producers: Narciso Y. Gulmatico, Jr.
- Producer: Maru R. Benitez
- Editors: Dennis A. Salgado; Shyra Mae C. Joaquin
- Running time: 30-45 minutes

Original release
- Network: ABS-CBN
- Release: August 31, 2015 – January 29, 2016

Related
- Pure Love (2014)

All of Me is a Philippine television drama fantasy series broadcast by ABS-CBN. Directed by Dondon S. Santos, it stars Albert Martinez, JM de Guzman, Yen Santos and Arron Villaflor. It aired on the network's Kapamilya Gold line up and worldwide on TFC from August 31, 2015 to January 29, 2016.

== Synopsis ==
Follow the story of Manuel Figueras (Albert Martinez), a devoted doctor, who decides to leave his flourishing career behind by living in an island after his wife, Dianna (Ina Raymundo) dies. While at the island, he meets Lena Dimaculangan (Yen Santos), a young woman who boldly challenges him to embrace life again, and despite their age gap, they find themselves in love. During their honeymoon in the island, a hired killer tries to kill Manuel, but he escapes death when he stumbles upon a magic portal that transforms him back to his younger self (JM de Guzman). Now, a younger Manuel who discovers that time has advanced faces another big challenge in his life – to seek revenge and win back Lena who is now happily married to his former protégé, Dr. Henry Nieves (Arron Villaflor), or forget her entirely and start a brand new chapter of his life.

== Cast and characters ==
=== Main cast ===
- Albert Martinez as Dr. Manuel Figueras
- JM de Guzman as Edong / teen Manuel Figueras
- Yen Santos as Lena Dimaculangan-Figueras/Nieves
- Arron Villaflor as Dr. Henry Nieves

=== Supporting cast ===
- Dentrix Ponce as Ivan Figueras / young Manuel Figueras
- Sue Ramirez as Kristel Sebastian
- Yam Concepcion as Bianca Rellosa-Nieves
- Neri Naig-Miranda as Princess Dimaculangan
- Ana Capri as Bebeng Dimaculangan
- Akira Morishita as Ringgo Dimaculangan
- Barbie Imperial as Apple de Asis
- Jordan Herrera as Ricardo "Carding" Sebastian
- Josef Elizalde as Lawrence Lablo
- Micah Muñoz as Nonoy

=== Guest cast ===
- Rayver Cruz as Marlon Santos
- John Manalo as Carlo Manalo
- Devon Seron as Rachel Manalo
- Susan Africa as Maria "Lola Aya" Sebastian
- Nafa Hilario as Liza
- Jan Michael Patricio Andres as Waldo
- Perla Bautista as Estrella
- Lorenzo Mara as Dr. Raul Zaragoza
- Lui Villaluz as Martin de Asis
- Bing Davao as Anselmo Dimaculangan
- Marco Alcaraz as Daniel
- Paolo Serrano as Marvin
- Junjun Quintana as Dennis Gonzaga

=== Special participation ===
- MJ Lastimosa as Tagapagbantay / Diwata Mizuchi / Salvacion
- Angel Aquino as Rosita Figueras
- Ina Raymundo as Dianna Figueras
- Jaime Fabregas as Dr. Vicente Avila
- Bugoy Cariño as young Henry Nieves
- Patrick Garcia as young Vicente Avila
- Precious Lara Quigaman as Vicente's mother

== Ratings ==
KANTAR MEDIA NATIONAL TV RATINGS (3:30PM PST)
PILOT EPISODE	FINALE EPISODE	PEAK	AVERAGE	SOURCE
39.4%	45.2%	37.4%	TBA	

== Re-runs ==
The show aired re-runs on Jeepney TV from May 1 to July 26, 2017; December 9, 2019 to March 20, 2020; March 29 to June 11, 2021; and December 30, 2024 to March 14, 2025 (also aired on ALLTV).

== International broadcast ==
Country	Network	Title
United States	KIKU	All of Me

== See also ==
- List of programs broadcast by ABS-CBN
- List of ABS-CBN Studios original drama series
