= Arron Villaflor =

Filipino rapper and actor (born 1990)

Member of the Tarlac Provincial Board from the 2nd district
- Incumbent
- Assumed office June 30, 2025 Serving with Harmes Sembrano, Dennis Go and Topey delos Reyes

Personal details
- Born: Arron Lumba Villaflor; July 5, 1990 (age 36) Tarlac, Tarlac, Philippines
- Party: PFP (2024–present)
- Height: 5 ft 8 in (173 cm)
- Occupation: Rapper, actor, dancer, model, host and prayer leader
- Years active: 2005–present
- Agents: Star Magic (2005–2022) Cornerstone Entertainment TV5 Network (2021–present); Viva Artists Agency (2022–present)

Arron Lumba Villaflor (born July 5, 1990) is a Filipino actor, rapper, dancer, prayer leader and politician. He started his career in Philippines' showbiz industry in the second season of Star Circle Quest where he finished as the runner-up. He is currently managed by Cornerstone Entertainment and Viva Artist Agency.

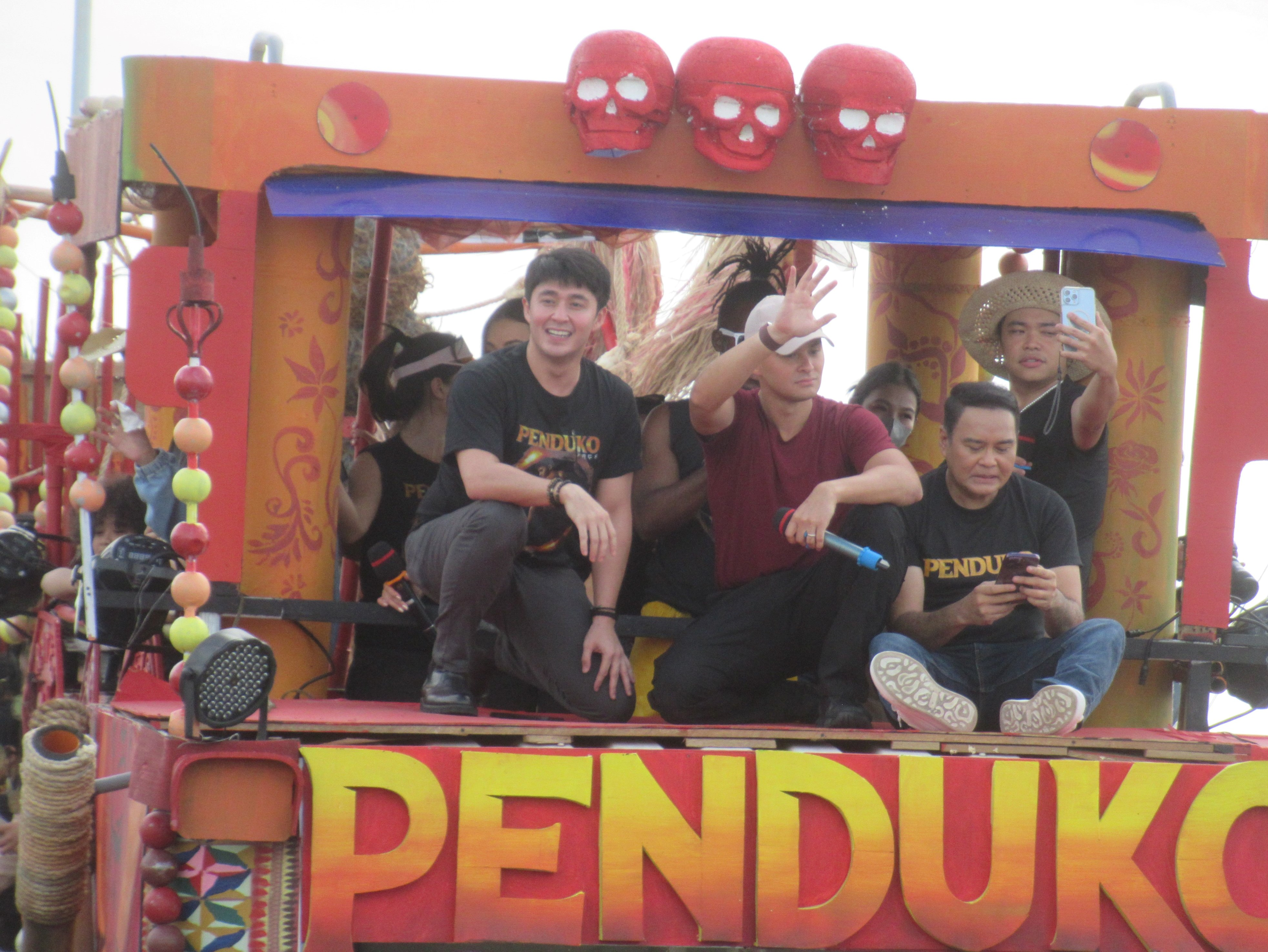
Villaflor in Penduko

== Early life and background ==
Born and raised in Tarlac, where he spent his foundational years. Enrolled at the Ateneo de Manila University, where he balanced his life as a working actor and an active student. He majored in Operations Management. Continued his higher education into adulthood. He pursued his Master's Degree at Lyceum-Northwestern University.

== Acting career ==
After his breakthrough on Star Circle Quest, Villaflor joined the ABS-CBN talent arm Star Magic. He quickly became a familiar face on Philippine television, landing notable roles in fantasy series like Pedro Penduko at ang mga Engkantao and the highly successful superhero drama Juan dela Cruz (2013). He continued to build a strong TV presence, appearing in shows like All of Me (2015) and Ang Probinsyano (2019–2020).

Villaflor expanded his horizons by taking on more mature roles in the streaming and independent cinema sectors. His recent works include films like Celestina: Burlesk Dancer (2024), Selda Tres (2025), and the films Pater Noster and Tenement. Managed by Cornerstone Entertainment and Viva Artists Agency, he has successfully balanced his show business commitments alongside ventures into local public service in Tarlac.

== Political career ==
In October 2024, Villaflor filed his candidacy for board member of the second district of Tarlac under the Partido Federal ng Pilipinas in the 2025 Philippine general election.

== Personal life ==
He is occasionally associated with his past showbiz relationships most notably his highly publicized romance with actress Jane de Leon though he has stated they broke off on good terms as their careers grew.

He remains in a committed, long-term relationship with non-showbiz partner Camille Buenaventura. The two have been publicly together since they made their relationship official in 2020.

In March 2026, Villaflor formally released statements condemning the "weaponization of private content" after unauthorized intimate videos circulated online. He referred the matter to authorities, citing digital abuse and violations of privacy, while clarifying that previous clips that surfaced were merely old scenes from past films.

== Acting credits ==
=== Film ===
Key
†	Denotes films that have not yet been released

Arron Villaflor's film credits with year of release, film titles and roles
Year	Title	Role	Ref.
2005	Can This Be Love	Louie	
2006	You Are the One	Ryan	
2007	Katas ng Saudi	Guest actor	
2008	Caregiver	Guest role	
2010	Mamarazzi	Glen Santos-Gonzales	
2013	Call Center Girl	Perry Manlapat	
2015	Heneral Luna	Joven Hernando	
2017	Spirit of the Glass 2: The Haunted	Budoy	
2018	Goyo: Ang Batang Heneral	Joven Hernando	
2019	Clarita	Father Benedicto	
2023	Nightbird	Dennis	
2023	Beloved	Joel	
2023	Star Dancer	Prince	
2023	Hilom	Sam	
2023	Wild Flowers	Kevin	
2023	Tuhog	Michael	
2023	Penduko	Saki	
2024	Celestina: Burlesk Dancer	Leandro	
2025	In Thy Name	Captain Sabban	
2025	Selda Tres	—N/a	
2025	Quezon	Joven Hernando	
2026	Tenement	—N/a	
2026	Pater Noster	Peter Mesias	

=== Television ===
Key
†	Denotes shows that have not yet been aired

Arron Villaflor's television credits with year of release, title(s) and role
Year	Title	Role	Ref.
2004–2005	Star Circle National Teen Quest	Himself / Contestant (1st runner-up)	
2006	U Can Dance	Himself / Contestant (winner)	
2006	Your Song Presents: Akin Ka Na Lang	Totoy	
2007	Sana Maulit Muli	Kevin Roque	
2007	Pedro Penduko at ang mga Engkantao	Edward	
2007–2022; 2025–present	ASAP XP	Himself – Host / Performer	
2008	Love Spell Presents: Game	Totoy	
2008	Komiks Presents: Mars Ravelo's Tiny Tony	Bryan De Jesus / Red Cloud	
2009	Your Song Presents: Boystown	Raul	
2009	Agimat: Ang Mga Alamat ni Ramon Revilla: Tiagong Akyat	Jigo Manuson	
2009	Dahil May Isang Ikaw	Marco Aragon	
2010	Midnight DJ: JS Prom Nightmare	Raffy	
2010	Maalaala Mo Kaya: Dancing Shoes	Ariel	
2010	Maynila	Kristoff	
2010	Shout Out!	Himself	
2011	Agimat: Ang Mga Alamat ni Ramon Revilla: Bianong Bulag	Edwin	
2011	Maynila	Jake	
2011	Mara Clara	Cameo Appearance	
2011	Good Vibes	Franco Mendoza	
2011	Maalaala Mo Kaya: Tulay	Nikko	
2011	Maria la del Barrio	Vladimir Dela Vega	
2012	Maynila: Reckless Heart	Jed	
2013	Maalaala Mo Kaya: Puntod	Raul	
2013	Precious Hearts Romances Presents: Paraiso	Sonny Alipio	
2013	Juan dela Cruz	Mikael "Kael" Reyes	
2013	Maalaala Mo Kaya: Wedding Booth	Marq	
2014	Ipaglaban Mo: Sa Aking Pagbangon	Popoy	
2014	Pure Love	Ronald Trinidad	
2015	Kapamilya, Deal or No Deal	Briefcase No. 10	
2015	Wansapanataym: Yamishita's Treasures	Arkin	
2015	All of Me	Dr. Henry Nieves	
2016	Ipaglaban Mo: Sabik	Romeo	
2016	Umagang Kay Ganda	Guest Host	
2016	Magandang Buhay	Guest	
2016	The Greatest Love	Rafael "Paeng" Alegre	
2018	Asintado	Ramoncito "Chito" Salazar	
2019	Ipaglaban Mo: Barang	Athan Bautista	
2019	FPJ's Ang Probinsyano	Police S/Insp. (Captain) Amir Marquez	
2021–2022	Niña Niño	Bert	
2023	Secret Campus	Joaquin	

=== Theater ===
- 2002: First Name - Judah
- 2008: Ibong Adarna - Don Juan

== Accolades ==
Year	Award giving body	Category	Nominated work	Results
2013	27th PMPC Star Awards for TV	Best Drama Supporting Actor	Juan dela Cruz	Won
2014	Golden Screen TV Awards	Outstanding Supporting Actor in a Drama Series	Juan dela Cruz	Nominated
2016	18th Gawad PASADO Awards	Best Supporting Actor	Heneral Luna	Nominated
2016	30th PMPC Star Awards for Television	Best Drama Supporting Actor (tied with Arjo Atayde)	All of Me	Won
2017	31st PMPC Star Awards for Television	Best Drama Supporting Actor	The Greatest Love	Nominated
