= Sylvia Sanchez =

Filipino actress (born 1971)

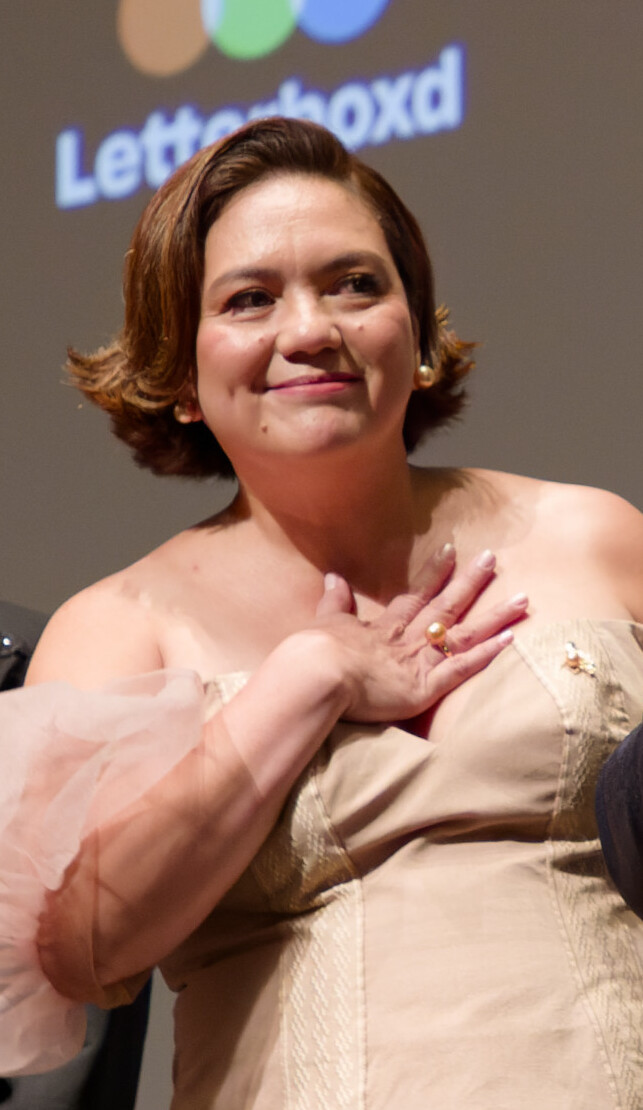
- Sanchez in 2024
- Born: Jossette Campo; May 19, 1971 (age 55); Nasipit, Agusan del Norte, Philippines
- Occupations: Actress, comedian, producer
- Years active: 1988–present
- Agents: Cornelia Lee (1988–2017); Powerhouse Arte, Inc. (2017–present); ALV Talent Management (2019–present)
- Spouse: Art Atayde (m. 2004)
- Children: 4 (including Arjo and Ria)
- Relatives: Maine Mendoza (daughter-in-law); Zanjoe Marudo (son-in-law)

Jossette Campo-Atayde (born May 19, 1971), known professionally as Sylvia Sanchez, is a Filipino actress and comedian. Among her accolades include three PMPC Star Awards for Television, one FAMAS Award, one Golden Screen TV Award, one Metro Manila Film Festival award, and one PMPC Star Award for Movies.

== Personal life ==
Jossette Campo was born and raised in Nasipit, Agusan del Norte. Her father, Robert Ocampo, a retired seafarer, abandoned their family when she was 10. At this early age, she realized she would need to be the breadwinner. She worked so that she could send her siblings to school.

She has four children with husband Arturo N. Atayde, whom she met in 1989, including Arjo and Ria. She also has another daughter from a previous relationship. On March 27, 2004, they got married at the Our Lady of Lourdes Parish Church in Tagaytay.

On March 31, 2020, Sanchez announced that she and her husband Art Atayde had tested positive for the COVID-19 disease, making them one of the first public figures to do so during the COVID-19 pandemic in the Philippines.

== Career ==
Sanchez first started as a sexy actress before transcending into one of the country's best known actresses. In 1997-1999 she starred in the critically acclaimed primetime soap opera Esperanza as the main anti-heroine. In the 2000s, majority of her work were supporting roles but in 2012–2013, after doing roles for both GMA and ABS-CBN, she would do another antagonist role in Mundo Man ay Magunaw opposite Eula Valdez.

In 2016, she took the role in The Greatest Love as a mother struggling with Alzheimer's, a portrayal that gave her more recognition worldwide. From 2017 to 2018, she starred in Hanggang Saan opposite her son Arjo Atayde.

== Filmography ==
=== Film ===
| Year | Title | Role |
|---|---|---|
| 1988 | Nympa sa Putikan | |
| 1988 | Kahit ako'y tupang itim, may langit din | |
| 1989 | Hot Summer | |
| 1989 | M&M, the Incredible Twins | |
| 1989 | Student Body | |
| 1990 | Twist Ako si ikaw, ikaw si ako | Girls Club |
| 1990 | Nimfa | |
| 1990 | Tora tora, bang bang bang | |
| 1990 | Starzan 3 | |
| 1990 | Angel Cremenal | |
| 1990 | Shake, Rattle & Roll II | Melanie |
| 1991 | Mahal ko ang Mister mo | |
| 1991 | Dinampot ka lang sa putik | |
| 1991 | Cheeta-eh: Ganda lalake? | Shiela |
| 1991 | Darna | |
| 1991 | Buburahin kita sa Mundo! | |
| 1992 | Takbo... Talon... Tili!!! | Lucresia/Ms. Lopez |
| 1992 | Lumaban ka, itay | Jacky Santiago |
| 1992 | Alyas Joker: Sigue-Sigue 22 Commando | |
| 1992 | Stella Magtangol | |
| 1993 | Dagul | |
| 1993 | Isang Linggong Pag-ibig | |
| 1993 | Abel Morado: Ikaw ang may sala | |
| 1993 | Paniwalaan Mo | |
| 1994 | Marami ka pang kakaining bigas | |
| 1995 | Minsan pa: Kahit konting pagtingin Part 2 | The bride |
| 1995 | Demolisyon: Dayuhan sa sariling bayan | |
| 1995 | Di mapigil ang init | |
| 1995 | Ikaw lang ang mamahalin: Camiguin | |
| 1996 | Hindi lahat ng Ahas ay nasa Gubat | |
| 1996 | Tolentino | |
| 1996 | Seth Corteza | |
| 1996 | Isla (The Young Version) | |
| 1996 | Kristo | Adulteress |
| 1997 | Kahit hindi turuan ang puso | |
| 1997 | Kulayan natin ang bukas | |
| 1997 | Enteng en Mokong: Kaming mga Mababaw ang Kaligayahan | Girlie |
| 1997 | Hanggang Kailan Kita Mamahalin | Dianne |
| 1998 | Gangland | Gigi |
| 1999 | Esperanza: The Movie | Celia Estrera |
| 2000 | Akin Ang Labang Ito | |
| 2000 | Pag Oras Mo, Oras Mo Na | |
| 2001 | Angels | Miriam |
| 2002 | Forevermore | Teresa |
| 2005 | Dreamboy | Jaime's mother |
| 2008 | Sikil | Aling Norma |
| 2010 | Miss You like Crazy | Sol Samonte |
| 2011 | Wedding Tayo, Wedding Hindi | Yolly Bautista |
| 2011 | Bulong | Lili |
| 2014 | The Trial | Sampi Jimenez |
| 2017 | Nay | Luisa |
| 2018 | Mama's Girl | Mina Eduque |
| 2019 | Alone/Together | Hilda M. Lazaro |
| 2019 | OFW: The Movie | Ofelia |
| 2025 | I'mPerfect | Norma |
| 2026 | Ria | Olga |

=== Television ===
| Year | Title | Role(s) |
|---|---|---|
| 1989–1995 | Anna Luna | |
| 1994 | Maalaala Mo Kaya: Bakya | |
| 1994 | Maalaala Mo Kaya: Sa Kandugan mo Inay | Lily |
| 1995 | Maalaala Mo Kaya: Abo | Igme's wife |
| 1996 | Maalaala Mo Kaya: Trapo | |
| 1996 | Maalaala Mo Kaya: Basketball | |
| 1997–1999 | Esperanza | Celia Estrera |
| 1998 | Maalaala Mo Kaya: Voice Tape | |
| 1999 | Maalaala Mo Kaya: Sinehan | |
| 2000 | Maalaala Mo Kaya: Parol | |
| 2001 | Wansapanataym: Si Louie, Si Luisa | Valentina |
| 2001 | Maalaala Mo Kaya: Baras | |
| 2001–2002 | Recuerdo de Amor | Beatriz Auble |
| 2002 | Maalaala Mo Kaya: Mikropono | |
| 2002 | Tabing Ilog | Mameng |
| 2002–2003 | Bituin | Eva |
| 2003–2004 | Basta't Kasama Kita | Strawberry Gonzales |
| 2003 | Maalaala Mo Kaya: Liham | |
| 2003 | Maalaala Mo Kaya: Plake | |
| 2003 | Maalaala Mo Kaya: Aparado | |
| 2004 | Maalaala Mo Kaya: Jacket | |
| 2004 | Maalaala Mo Kaya: Plaka | |
| 2004 | Maalaala Mo Kaya: Popcorn | |
| 2005 | Maalaala Mo Kaya: Trolley | Inang |
| 2005 | Maalaala Mo Kaya: Paru-paro | |
| 2005–2006 | Mga Anghel na Walang Langit | Marian Lopez |
| 2006 | Maalaala Mo Kaya: Palaisdaan | Inda |
| 2006 | Crazy for You | Gigi |
| 2007 | Mga Kuwento ni Lola Basyang: Si Pedrong Walang Takot | |
| 2007 | Maalaala Mo Kaya: Ilog | Cering |
| 2008 | E.S.P. | |
| 2008 | Maalaala Mo Kaya: Gayuma | Aida's mother |
| 2008–2009 | Eva Fonda | Edeng De Jesus |
| 2009 | Your Song: Underage | Berta |
| 2010 | Maalaala Mo Kaya: Saranggola | Raul's mother |
| 2010 | Tween Hearts | Irene Fortez |
| 2010 | Langit sa Piling Mo | Mely Rosales |
| 2010–2011 | Koreana | Sandra Rosales |
| 2011 | Iglot | Betty |
| 2011 | Maalaala Mo Kaya: Manok | Poying/Julie |
| 2012 | Mundo Man ay Magunaw | Leilani "Lani" San Juan |
| 2012 | Maalaala Mo Kaya: Cellphone | Jinella |
| 2012–2014 | Be Careful with My Heart | Teresita Dela Paz-Dela Rosa |
| 2013 | Apoy sa Dagat | Tessie/Calixta Caballero |
| 2013 | Toda Max | Nena |
| 2014 | Pure Love | Ramona Esguerra |
| 2015 | Pangako Sa 'Yo | Krystal Toleda |
| 2015–2016 | Ningning | Pacing "Mamay" Angeles |
| 2015–2016 | Kapamilya Deal or No Deal | Briefcase Number 5 |
| 2016 | Maalaala Mo Kaya: Alkansya | Liza |
| 2016 | My Super D | Evelyn "Belen" Bermudez-Aguilar |
| 2016 | Maalaala Mo Kaya: Korona | Jule |
| 2016–2017 | The Greatest Love | Gloria Guerrero-Alegre / Gloria Guerrero-Alcantara |
| 2017 | Ipaglaban Mo!: Testigo | Teresa De Guzman |
| 2017 | La Luna Sangre | Dolores "Dory" Lumakad |
| 2017–2018 | Hanggang Saan | Sonya Magat-Alipio |
| 2019–2020 | Pamilya Ko | Luzviminda "Luz" Ramirez-Mabunga |
| 2020 | Maalaala Mo Kaya: Stethoscope | Celestina Bactol |
| 2020 | Maalaala Mo Kaya: Bracelet | Celestina Bactol |
| 2021 | Huwag Kang Mangamba | Virginia "Barang" Angeles |
| 2022 | Misis Piggy | Marivic |
| 2023–2024 | Senior High | Lydia "Amam" Geronimo |
| TBA | Sellblock | |

== Awards and nominations ==
| Year | Award giving body/Critics | Category | Work | Result | Source |
|---|---|---|---|---|---|
| 1992 | 18th Metro Manila Film Festival | Best Supporting Actress | Takbo... Talon... Tili!!!: "Ang Lalaki sa Salamin" | Won | |
| 1997 | 11th PMPC Star Awards for Television | Best Single Performance by an Actress | Calvento Files | Won | |
| 2012 | 26th PMPC Star Awards for Television | Best Single Performance by an Actress | Maalaala Mo Kaya: "Aswang" | Won | |
| 2013 | Golden Screen TV Awards | Outstanding Performance by an Actress in a Single Drama/Telemovie Program | Untold Strories: "Kahit ako'y mangmang" | Won | |
| 2013 | 29th PMPC Star Awards for Movies | Darling of the Press | | Nominated | |
| 2013 | 27th PMPC Star Awards for Television | Best Drama Supporting Actress | Be Careful With My Heart | Nominated | |
| 2015 | 31st PMPC Star Awards for Movies | Movie Supporting Actress of the Year | The Trial | Won | |
| 2015 | 63rd FAMAS Awards | Best Supporting Actress | The Trial | Won | |
| 2016 | 30th PMPC Star Awards for Television | Best Drama Supporting Actress | Ningning | Nominated | |
| 2017 | 15th Gawad Tanglaw Awards | Best Performance by an Actress in a series | The Greatest Love | Won | |
| 2017 | 20th Gawad Pasado Awards | Pinakapasadong Aktres sa Teleserye | Hanggang Saan | Won | |
| 2017 | 25th KBP Golden Dove Awards | Best TV Actress in a Drama Program | The Greatest Love | Won | |
| 2017 | 31st PMPC Star Awards for Television | Best Drama Actress | The Greatest Love | Won | |
| 2017 | Cinema One Originals Film Festival | Best Actress | Nay | Nominated | |
| 2018 | 32nd PMPC Star Awards for Television | Best Drama Actress | Hanggang Saan | Nominated | |
| 2019 | 2019 Sinag Maynila Film Festival | Best Actress | Jesusa | Won | |
| 2019 | Subic Bay International Film Festival | Best Actress | Jesusa | Won | |
| 2019 | 35th PMPC Star Awards for Movies | Darling of the Press | | Nominated | |
| 2025 | 51st Metro Manila Film Festival | Best Supporting Actress | I'mperfect | Nominated | |
