= List of Juan dela Cruz characters =

Juan dela Cruz features numerous characters. As a fantasy series, Juan dela Cruz also features non-human characters widely based from creatures from Philippine folklore such as the aswang and the engkanto. The visual design of the characters were created by Noel Flores. This Article also features characters from the series My Little Juan

== Main characters ==
Concept art of Juan dela Cruz

Juan dela Cruz
Portrayed by: Arjo Atayde, Izzy Canillo (young)

Juan dela Cruz is the primary protagonist of the series. He is a simple, good-spirited but misunderstood man. He was an orphan, never seeing his father and her mother who died after his birth. During his childhood, Juan was raised by Father Cito, the parish priest of San Juan Bautista. He was either loathed or misunderstood by the townspeople due to his mischievousness and temper. He was also labeled as the son of the devil due to his exhibiting superhuman abilities even though he uses these powers for good. After Father Cito's death, the parish priest's sister, Belen took custody over Juan and moved to Quiapo, Manila. Clueless about the identity of his father, he is the son of the Haring Aswang (King Aswangs) and the Anak ng Dilim (Son of Darkness), who is destined to lead the aswangs and take over humanity.

Rosario Galang-dela Cruz / Rosario Guerrero
Portrayed by: Erich Gonzales, Alyanna Angeles (young)

Rosario is the love interest of Juan dela Cruz. She is a flower vendor who manages the family's flowershop in Dangwa. Juan helped her when they were young. Her main struggles is to prove to her parents and to Juan that she can be independent. She discovers she is adopted as a baby, and was later revealed that she is the biological daughter of the leader of the Kapatiran.

== Humans ==
Belen "Loley" Gozales
Portrayed by: Gina Pareño

Belen is the younger sister of Father Cito and the current guardian of Juan dela Cruz after the latter's childhood guardian died. She was a fortune teller in Quaipo, a contrast to her brother's occupation as a priest. Belen is a loving and caring guardian to Juan and his friends Asiong and Pikoy, who often worries about their safety.

Asiong
Portrayed by: Neil Coleta, Lance Lucido (young)

Juan's trusted best friend and sidekick. Juan rescued him when they were kids from a group of boy-thugs and since then helped in Juan's adventures and misadventures.

Pikoy
Portrayed by: Louise Abuel

A young boy Juan rescued from a crime syndicate. Mature and street-smart. He is instrumental to Juan's finding of the Bakal na Krus.

Cora Galang
Portrayed by: Lotlot de Leon

Rosario's mother. She acts as her daughter's confidant who gives her advice and comfort.

Ben Galang
Portrayed by: William Lorenzo

Rosario's father. A typical family man who is protective of his daughter. Ben doesn't want to see Rosario going out with Juan because of his bad reputation.

=== Kapatiran ===
The Kapatiran (Brotherhood) is a group whose cause is to protect the people from the Aswangs. According to Flores, real life revolutionaries, the Katipunan, served as an inspiration for the group's visual symbols. The Kapatiran's symbol has rays on the emblem that radiates from a cross instead of a sun.

Jose "Pepe" Guerrero
Portrayed by: Joel Torre

Mang Pepe was the leader of the Kapatiran. He vowed to kill the Haring Aswang after the latter killed his wife. He is the real father of Rosario, he entrusted his daughter to Ben and Cora. He was kidnap by the Haring Aswang and he turned him into an Aswang. He was killed by Juan using the Spear of Valor.

Julian "Lolo Juls" dela Cruz
Portrayed by: Eddie Garcia, Jomari Yllana (young)

Julian is father of Amelia and the biological grandfather of Juan, who wasn't aware of his grandson's existence until recently.

Agustin Magdiwang
Portrayed by: John Medina

The most prominent member of the Kapatiran and Pepe's right-hand man. He acts as a spy and informant. He doubts Juan's capability to be the next Tagabantay.He was killed by the Haring Aswang after he attacks the kapatiran's lair.

== Aswang ==
The Aswangs are the primary enemy of the Kapatiran and the Tagabantay. The Aswangs are beastly creatures which feast on human flesh. According to Flores, the aswangs' color was made violet to symbolize deception. The aswangs use deception in order to blend into human society to achieve their goal to dominate humanity. The aswangs may appear as normal beings but can transform into their true form.

The Lahing Alipio, the uppermost members of the aswang caste system, have inscriptions on their faces. These inscriptions are status symbols shows the achievements of an aswang like killing a member of the Kapatiran

Samuel Alejandro
Portrayed by: Albert Martinez

Samuel Alejandro was the Haring Aswang (King Aswang), the leader of the aswangs. He was married to Laura and father to Kael. He was responsible for the assimilation of the aswang into human society. Besides from being leader of his race, he was also a rich businessman. Samuel is a man of duty and usually has a calm but cold personality. Samuel, in a bid to get the Bakal ng Krus, befriended the Tagabantay Amelia but he fell in love for her. Their relationship resulted in Juan dela Cruz's existence. Upon realizing that Juan was his real son, he tried to gain the trust of Juan so that his son's destiny of being the Anak ng Dilim shall be fulfilled. However this gave rise to genuine fatherly feelings for his son. He was killed by Peru-ha.

Laura Alejandro
Portrayed by: Zsa Zsa Padilla

Laura was the Reynang Aswang (Queen Aswang), the wife of Samuel and the mother of Kael. She has ill feelings towards the Tagabantay. She was also a loving mother to her son. After Kael's death she becomes a manananggal and was killed by Juan.

Mikael "Kael" Guzman Reyes
Portrayed by: Arron Villaflor

Mikael Reyes, also known by his nickname as Kael, is the son of Samuel and Laura. Kael was a policeman and the love rival of Juan dela Cruz over Rosario Galang. He is also Juan's half-brother. After failing to win the heart of Rosario, Kael grew jealous on Juan. Upon perceiving that Juan "robbed him of his father's approval and his destiny as the Anak ng Dilim", his jealously grew into hatred. Kael is insecure and seeks to win the approval and love of his father, which he did not felt since childhood. He was killed by Juan after a fierce battle.

Queenie
Portrayed by: MC

Queenie was Laura's gay fashion stylist. An Aswang with a laughing sickness. He can't help but turn into an Aswang after a fit of uncontrollable laughter. He was killed by the Haring Aswang.

Emil
Portrayed by: James Blanco, Polo Gander (young)

Laura's stubborn younger brother; uncle to Kael. Emil doesn't believe in Samuel's leadership because he sees him as weak. He is the first one to discover that Juan is keeping the Bakal na Krus and thus, the Tagabantay. He was killed by Juan.

Tonton
Portrayed by: Zaijian Jaranilla

A young Aswang captured by Juan and the Kapatiran. Juan lets him go because he can't kill a child. He told Juan he doesn't want to eat human flesh anymore. He was later killed by an Aswang and his death causes Juan to unleash the Bow of knowledge.

Omar
Portrayed by: Jason Abalos

An Aswang warrior who was sent to kill the Tagabantay, but failed. He was killed by Juan.

Abdul
Portrayed by: Ron Morales

An Aswang warrior who later became Peru-ha's guard. He was killed by Asiong.

Digo
Portrayed by: Ivan Carapiet
A skilled Aswang and Samuel's right-hand man. He later became Peru-ha's guard along with Abdul. He was killed by Julian.

Anak ng Dilim
Portrayed by: Coco Martin

Juan's Alter-ego and the strongest Aswang according to the prophecy. The Anak ng Dilim controls Juan when he was angry. Later Peru-ha successfully traps Juan and the Anak ng Dilim appears in his body. Juan later overpowers him. But Peru-ha was able to get him out of Juan and he later kidnaps Rosario and threatens to kill her if Juan didn't give up the Bakal na Krus. After a fierce battle with the Tagabantay, Juan permanently destroyed him.

== Engkanto and Diwata ==
The Engkanto race is an ally of the Kapatiran and the Tagabantay. A Diwata, as frequently used in the series, refers to a female engkanto. In real-life Philippine folklore, the engkanto and diwata although similar are two different beings.

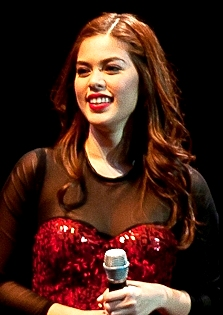
Shaina Magdayao as Prinsesa Mirathea "Mira"

Prinsesa Mirathea "Mira"
Portrayed by: Shaina Magdayao, Belinda Mariano (young)

Mirathea is the princess of the Engkanto Kingdom. Under the name Mira, she was sent to the human world by her mother Nerea to aid the Tagabantay. She harbours romantic feelings towards Juan dela Cruz although she does not pursue Juan or give hints of her feelings for the Tagabantay out of respect to the relationship of Juan and Rosario.

Reyna Nerea
Portrayed by: Precious Lara Quigaman

Nerea is the mother of Mira and the ruling monarch of the Engkanto Kingdom after her husband Mana-on died.

Bagno
Portrayed by: Martin del Rosario

Bagno is the leader of the troops in the Engkanto Kingdom. He has romantic interest towards Mira although the latter considers him only as a friend.

Liway
Portrayed by: Marlann Flores

Liway is Mira's friend, who was also sent to the human world to aid the Tagabantay. She has romantic interest towards Asiong.

Tatlong Maria
Portrayed by: Maricar Reyes

Serves as an oracle for the engkantos. they tell the prophecy and what's about to happen.

Peru-ha / Saragnayan
Portrayed by: Diana Zubiri

Peru-ha is the main antagonist of the series. She is an evil diwata and the stepsister of Mana-on. After Mana-on was favored and ascended to the Engkanto throne by their father Kan-laon, she staged a coup to take what she believes was rightfully hers; the throne. She failed and was imprisoned in a cave in Homonhon island. She made contact with a human tribe led by Datu Alipio. Peru-ha turned Datu Alipio and his men into the first aswangs. Peru-ha is worshipped by the Aswangs and was known to them as the Goddess Saragnayan. She was permanently destroyed by Juan.

Haring Mana-on
Portrayed by: Tonton Gutierrez

Mira's Father, Nerea's husband and the former king of the engkanto kingdom. She is also Peru-ha's brother.

Dalik
Portrayed by: Ronnie Lazaro

Bagno's Father and one of the loyal knights of the engkanto kingdom. But turns bad when Peru-ha hypnotized him.

Santana
Portrayed by: Vice Ganda

The queen of the Tikabalang who kidnaps Mira. She starts first as an antagonist but later befriended Juan and the others.

Agor
Portrayed by: John Regala

Agor is Peru-ha's right-hand man and also her love interest, who initiates and accomplishes the plans of his then-imprisoned master. Agor is a cunning, cold and manipulative character. He was nearly killed by Juan but he chose to kill himself.

== My Little Juan Characters ==
Father Cito
Portrayed by: Jaime Fabregas

He is a kind-hearted priest who raised Juan after Amelia's death. He was aware of Juan's origins and decided to nourish him and lead him to the right path. He loves Juan dearly and taught him many life lessons. He befriends Alvin and Ruth and trained to fight the aswang to protect Juan. He was killed by Poldo after Poldo steals the Bakal ng Krus. Before he died, he told Juan to retrieve the Bakal ng Krus because of its connection to his future life.

Amelia
Portrayed by: Mylene Dizon

She is Juan's mother and a tagabantay who falls in love with Samuel, a haring aswang. She finds refuge at Father Cito's Church before she dies from giving birth to her son, Juan.

Donya Tomasa
Portrayed by: Tetchie Agbayani

An arrogant woman and one of the richest person in San Juan Bautista. She is selfish and she hates Juan because he always ruin her plans. She have a dark past that causes her to be cruel. She later repented for her sins and leaves town after learning that her assistant, Margie is an aswang.

Alvin
Portrayed by: Smokey Manaloto

A member of the kapatiran who finds out about Juan being the next tagabantay. He and his wife, Ruth, befriend Father Cito and battled the aswang to avenge their child. He was killed when he save Ruth from the aswang.

Ruth
Portrayed by: Desiree Del Valle

A member of Kapatiran and Alvin's wife. She befriends father Cito and battled the aswang. After Alvin's death she wants to have revenge on Margie. After a fierce battle she told father Cito that her mission is over, take care Juan and that she will be with her family once again. She and Margie fell to their deaths. She failed to tell Pepe about the tagabantay.

Margie
Portrayed by: Wendy Valdez

Donya Tomasa's Assistant later revealed to be an Aswang. The main antagonist of My Little Juan. She is Poldo's lover. She plans to attack Alvin and Ruth but fails. She decided to take her revenge on Donya Tomasa but she already left. She later find out that Juan is the next tagabantay and planned to tell it to the haring aswang but she is stopped by Ruth. She fell to her death.

Audrey
Portrayed by: Arlene Tolibas

A gossiper who hated Juan and called him a son of deviland blamed Juan for everything. She and her husband Steve have a strained relationship. She later apologize to Juan and thanks him for saving her son Lester.

Steve
Portrayed by: Gerhard Acao

Audrey's husband who is kind and hardworking. Unlike her wife and son he didn't hate Juan.

Lester
Portrayed by: Nicky Castro

Audrey's son who also hates Juan and bullies him at school. He later have a change of heart and befriends Juan after saving him from a cliff.

Poldo
Portrayed by: Jhong Hilario

Margie's lover and a thief who stole the tools of the church including the bakal na krus and killed Father Cito. Juan searches him until he grows up and avenge Father Cito and retrieved the bakal na krus.
