= Sigabo =

Philippine action comedy television series

- Promotional poster
- Genre: Action comedy; Romantic comedy
- Created by: Coco Martin
- Developed by: Coco Martin
- Written by: Genesis Rodriguez; Noreen B. Capili; Lino Balmes; Jayson Mondragon; Bridgette Ann Rebuca; Andrian Legaspi; Jim Flores; Enrique S. Villasis
- Directed by: Malu L. Sevilla; Darnel Joy R. Villaflor; Richard V. Somes; Coco Martin
- Creative director: Coco Martin
- Starring: Coco Martin; Julia Montes
- Music by: Francis Concio
- Opening theme: "Sigabo" by Yeng Constantino
- Country of origin: Philippines
- Original language: Filipino
- No. of seasons: 1
- No. of episodes: 110

Production
- Executive producers: Carlo L. Katigbak; Cory V. Vidanes; Laurenti M. Dyogi
- Producers: Coco Martin; Julia Montes
- Production location: Tondo, Manila
- Editors: Renewin Alano; Peter Ashley Austria; Marian Haboc; Alfred Punzalan; Bernie Diasanta; Gerald Garcia; Edward Eugene Vagay; John Ryann Bonifacio
- Running time: 24–56 minutes
- Production companies: Dreamscape Entertainment; CCM Film Productions

Original release
- Network: Kapamilya Channel (Note: The series also airs on its primary networks All TV (through its ABS-CBN licensing) and Kapamilya Channel as well as other affiliate channels and online platforms via Kapamilya Online Live through Facebook and YouTube. It is also available on-demand via iWant and internationally via The Filipino Channel.)
- Release: June 22, 2026 – present

Coco Martin's Sigabo (transl. Coco Martin's Outburst) (simply known as Sigabo) is a Philippine television drama action comedy series produced by CCM Film Productions and Dreamscape Entertainment. Directed by Malu L. Sevilla, Darnel Joy R. Villaflor, Richard V. Somes and Coco Martin, it stars Martin and Julia Montes in the lead roles. The series premiered on All TV and Kapamilya Channel's Primetime Bida evening block on June 22, 2026.

The series reunites Martin and Montes on primetime television for the first time in four years, following the conclusion of their most recent collaboration in FPJ's Ang Probinsyano. Prior to the series, the two actors previously collaborated in Walang Hanggan, Ikaw Lamang, A Moment in Time, and the Wansapanataym episode "Yamashita's Treasures".

== Premise ==
After serving eight years in prison, a spunky man named Gabo is granted parole. But his long-awaited freedom comes at a price—he is forced into a covert government program that recruits convicts for dangerous, high-stakes missions.

== Cast and characters ==
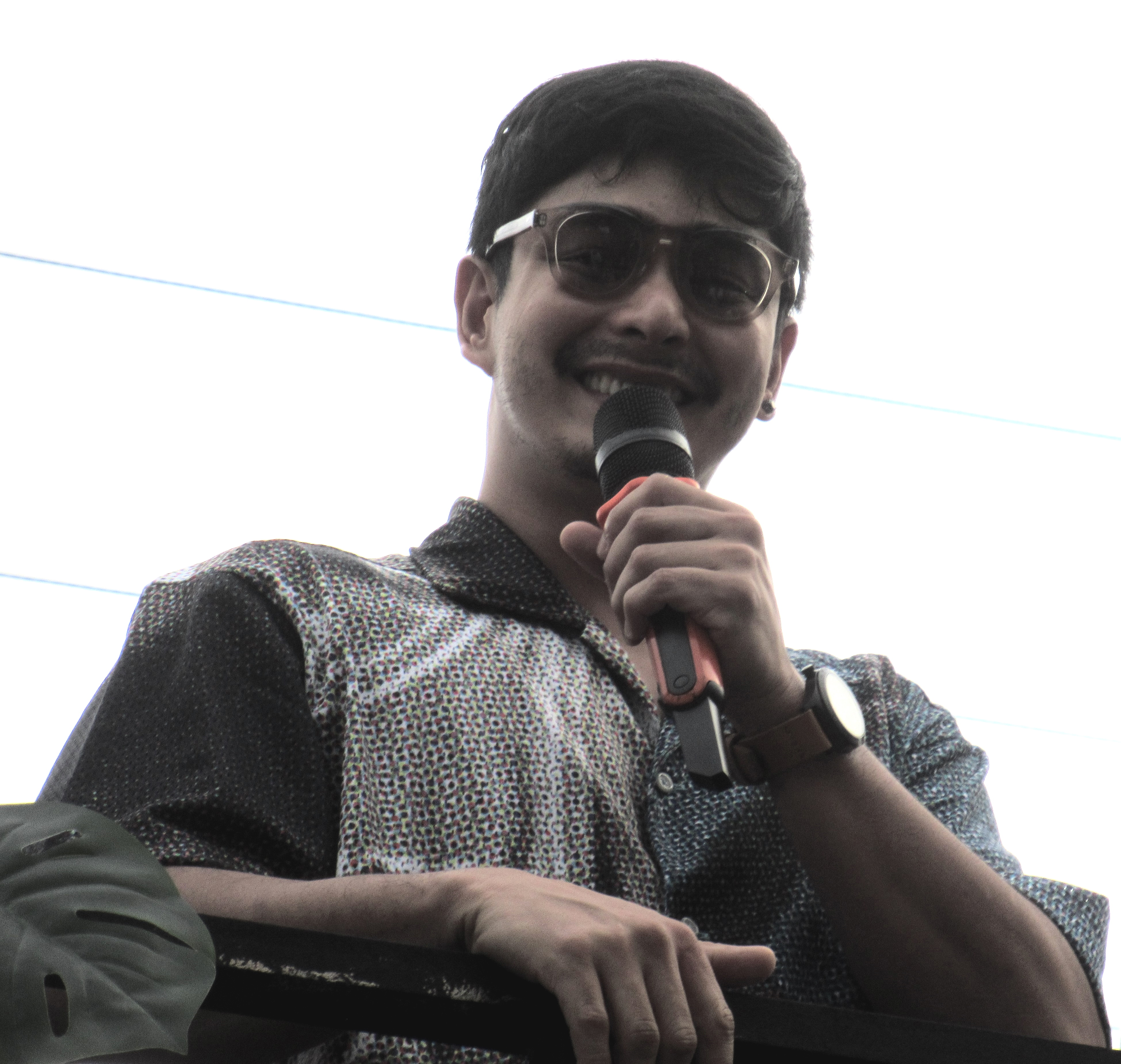
Coco Martin

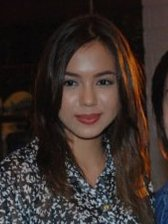
Julia Montes

=== Present ===
Main cast

- Coco Martin as Gabriel "Gabo" Pascual-Magtibay
  - Gian Luca Geroue as young Gabo
- Julia Montes as Former NCIA Agent Samantha "Sam" Jacinto / Gloria Magtibay
  - Kate Samly Bersosa as young Sam

Supporting cast

- Edu Manzano as Former PMGEN Ricardo Jacinto (Note: The character's rank is based on R.A. No. 11200, the current law prescribing police ranks in the Philippines)
  - Rafael Rosell as young Ricardo
- Joey Marquez as Rudy Magtibay
  - Zanjoe Marudo as young Rudy
- Carmi Martin as Isobel Jacinto
- Chanda Romero as Deborah Zafra
- Irma Adlawan as Betchay Cabagsik
  - Jennica Garcia as young Betchay
- Janice de Belen as National Defense Sec. Carlotta Vergara
- Malou Crisologo as Rose "Madam Rosa" Castro
- Jhong Hilario as Django
  - Jacob Cawagdan as young Django
- JM de Guzman as Victor "Tigre" Zafra
- JC de Vera as NCIA Agent Sebastian "Seb" Tuazon
- Arci Muñoz as PLT Maxine "Max" Jacinto
- Sue Ramirez as Tekla
- Ron Martin as Lucas Zafra
- Efren Reyes as Former PLTCOL Mariano Zafra
  - Joem Bascon as young Mariano
- Rez Cortez as Paquito
- Joko Diaz as PCPT Melchor Umali
- Jess Lapid Jr. as JSSupt. Daniel Macaraig
- Dindo Arroyo as Omeng
- Levi Ignacio as Tomas
- Val Iglesias as Romy
- Joonee Gamboa as Lorenzo (Note: He is identified as Lorenzo during a video call with Sec. Carlotta Vergara) / Papang / Pops / Tatang
- Soliman Cruz as NCIA Director Fernando Delgado
- Art Acuña as PLTCOL Romulo Domingo
- Jojit Lorenzo as Lawin
- Paolo Rodriguez as Uwak
- Julio Diaz as Dante Aguilar
- Ces Quesada as Mameng Magtibay-Aguilar
  - Nikki Valdez as young Mameng
- Richard Quan as Arturo Lucero
- Aleck Bovick as Ibyang
- Katherine Luna as NCIA Agent Pia Catacutan
- Ihman Esturco as Manny
- Lito Camo as Elton
- Rey Campanilla as Reporter Salvador Manalo
- Pinky Tobiano as Pinky
- Deborah Sun as Rosanna
- Myrna Castillo as Joyce
- Sarsi Emmanuelle as Priscilla
- Myra Manibog as Diana
- Coca Nicolas as Aya
- Jerald Napoles as Tolits
- Nikko Natividad as Binoy
- Bryan "Smugglaz" Lao as Bong
- Lordivino "Bassilyo" Ignacio as Ipe
- Sugar "Mammoth" Estroso as Daboy
- Mark Lapid as NCIA Agent Tony Castor
- Marc Solis as PEMS Estrella
- John Medina as NCIA Agent James Borromeo
- Eric "Eruption" Tai as NCIA Agent Bullet Seqioa
- Ryan Martin as NCIA Agent Robert Reyes
- Neil Coleta as Oli
- Nico Antonio as NCIA Agent Ernesto Rallos
- Via Antonio as NCIA Agent Karen Limbaga
- Nonong Ballinan as Toto
- Tess Antonio as Twinkle
- Lauren Novero as PMSg Renato Santos
- Chet Pastrana as Arnel Policarpio
- Ian Ignacio as Lao
- Janice Hung as Magie Lee
- Robby Dizon as Norris
- Joseph Cabral as Stallone
- Diana Opilac as Diday
- Ahl Opilac as Kulas
- Ahldrin Opilac as Estong
- Daryl "Skusta Clee" Ruiz as Quintin "Quin" Valentino
- Archie "Flow G" dela Cruz as Crisanto "Santo" Santos
- Miguel "Uncle Dags" Pelea as Heaven "Bones" Asuncion-Pabustan
- Angelica "Pastillas Girl" Yap as Angel
- Maika Rivera as Shanty
- Jenn Rosa as Roxy
- Apple Dy as Cherry
- Long Mejia as Boyet
- Slick V
- Cozy Wrld
- Dan "Gat Putch" Diaz
- Charles "Louie Grammz" Lim
- Jeffrey Tam as Chavo
- Epy Quizon as Armando "Ninong" Cruz

Guest cast

- Salvador "Badong" Domasian Jr. as Badong
- Andres "Kuya Bata" Balano Jr. as Mang Babot

=== Former ===
Supporting cast

- Cristine Reyes as Belinda Pascual
- Alex Castro as Ricardo "RJ" Jacinto Jr.
- Jaze Capili as Potchoy
- Princess "Kulot" Caponpon as Kulot
- Abatar Dacdac Jr. as Bokbok
- Rhed Mago as Palits
- Ryrie Sophia as Hopia
- John Nathaniel Ontua as Bilog
- Ricardo Cepeda as Raul Montero
- Ina Raymundo as Misty Manalo
- Kim Tobiano as Trixie
- Yen Durano as Paula
- Arah Alonzo as Bridgette Santos
- Mike Magat as Lando
- Gina Pareño as Anita "Lola Gets" Garcia
- Raquel Pareño as Gina Garcia
- Inka Magnaye as Alex's voice
- John "Papa Jackson" Gemperle as Papa Love

Guest cast

- Minnie Aguilar as Madam L
- Janice Jurado as Mama Grace
- John "Sweet" Lapus as Mama Franny
- Pepay Aguilar as Amel
- Tonton Soriano as Mikey
- Albert Nicolas as Tonyo
- Daniel Maglanque as Brando
- Chloe Webber as Trisha
- Alireza Libre as Organ Trafficking Syndicate Leader
- Wilmar Peñaflorida as Organ Trafficking Syndicate's henchman
- Mike Castillo as Mr. Edison Chan
- Eula Marie Guileno as Geraldine
- Darelle Tiu as Mercy
- Lizel Marquez as Linda
- Sophie Reyes as Jeep Passenger
- Zabel Lamberth as Jeep Passenger
- Jethro Ramirez as Raul's henchman
- Paolo Serrano as Raul's henchman
- Giovanni Baldisseri as Fuego
- Rani Caldoza as Atty. Tantoco
- Efrain Isip Duran as Lolo Jose

== Episodes ==
=== Story Arc 1: Acquittal and Heritage (2026–present) ===
==== Chapter 1 ====
The story follows Gabo as he begins a new chapter in his life after being acquitted. However, his freedom brings him into conflict with past enemies and unresolved rivalries. As he seeks revenge against those who betrayed him, Gabo gradually discovers long-hidden truths about his family and heritage that change his understanding of his past and identity.

No. overall	No. in season	Title	TV title	Original release date	AGB Nielsen Ratings (NUTAM People)	Timeslot rank
1	1	"Si Gabo ang Pagbabalik" (transl. The Return of Gabo)	"Ang Pagbabalik"	June 22, 2026	8.2%	#2
2	2	"Ginintuang Lupa" (transl. Golden Land)	"Ginintuang Lupa"	June 23, 2026	N/A	TBA
3	3	"Pagtutuos" (transl. Reckoning)	"Paghaharap"	June 24, 2026	N/A	TBA
4	4	"Bagong Trabaho" (transl. New Job)	"Trabaho"	June 25, 2026	N/A	TBA
5	5	"Demolition"	"Demolition"	June 26, 2026	N/A	TBA
6	6	"Diskarte" (transl. Strategy)	"Banta"	June 29, 2026	N/A	TBA
7	7	"Mensahero" (transl. Messenger)	"Pagmamatyag"	June 30, 2026	N/A	TBA
8	8	"Anino" (transl. Shadow)	"Anino"	July 1, 2026	N/A	TBA
9	9	"Unang Misyon" (transl. First Mission)	"Unang Misyon"	July 2, 2026	N/A	TBA
10	10	"Secret Agent"	"Malaking Kaso"	July 3, 2026	N/A	TBA
11	11	"Para kay Rudy" (transl. For Rudy)	"Para kay Rudy"	July 6, 2026	8.1%	#2
12	12	"Stakeout"	"Susundan"	July 7, 2026	8.4%	#2
13	13	"Pagtatagpo" (transl. Encounter)	"Mapanagot"	July 8, 2026	9.1%	#2
14	14	"Pumuslit" (transl. Sneaked Out)	"Target Locked"	July 9, 2026	9.2%	#2
15	15	"Aresto" (transl. Arrest)	"Gabo vs. Tigre"	July 10, 2026	7.3%	#2
16	16	"Takas at Huli" (transl. Escape and Capture)	"Nahuli si Tigre"	July 13, 2026	8.1%	#2
17	17	"Fall Out"	"Pakiusap"	July 14, 2026	7.9%	#2
18	18	"Areglo" (transl. Deal)	"Pera o Prinsipyo"	July 15, 2026	7.7%	#2
19	19	"Nawawalang Motorsiklo" (transl. Missing Motorcycle)	"Tubusin"	July 16, 2026	7.6%	#2
20	20	"Impounding"	"Bawiin ang Motor"	July 17, 2026	N/A	TBA
21	21	"Utos" (transl. Command)	"Kritikal"	July 20, 2026	N/A	TBA
22	22	"Pangalawang Misyon" (transl. Second Mission)	"Para sa Ama"	July 21, 2026	N/A	TBA
23	23	"Sugod" (transl. Attack)	"Pangalawang Misyon"	July 22, 2026	N/A	TBA
24	24	"Tukso ng Ginto" (transl. Temptation of Gold)	"Unahan kay Mr. Chan"	July 23, 2026	N/A	TBA
25	25	"Handa Na" (transl. Ready Now)	"Pasado sa Anino"	July 24, 2026	N/A	TBA
26	26	"Yesterday's Gold"	"Pag-amin"	July 27, 2026	N/A	TBA
27	27	"The Greatest Treasure"	"Nakaraan ni Rudy"	July 28, 2026	N/A	TBA
28	28	"Pagbabayarin" (transl. Pay)	"Natukso sa Ginto"	July 29, 2026	N/A	TBA
29	29	"The Hand That Saves"	"Bayani si Gabo"	July 30, 2026	N/A	TBA
30	30	"The Price of Power"	"Aya ng Tropa"	July 31, 2026	7.1%	#2
31	31	"Fueling Revenge"	"Isumbong kay Gabo"	August 3, 2026	7.7%	#2
32	32	"Shattered Alibis"	"Sa Iisang Lugar"	August 4, 2026	7.7%	#2
33	33	"Growing Jealousy"	"Selos"	August 5, 2026	7.7%	#2
34	34	"The Home She Built"	"Para sa Pamilya"	August 6, 2026	8.1%	#2
35	35	"A Father's Shame"	"Dukot"	August 7, 2026	N/A	TBA
36	36	"The Cost of Trust"	"Pagsagip ni Gabo"	August 10, 2026	N/A	TBA
37	37	"For Nanay" (transl. For Mother)	"Bangungot ng Nakaraan"	August 11, 2026	N/A	TBA
38	38	"The Heroes' Burdens"	"Hindi Pababayaan"	August 12, 2026	N/A	TBA
39	39	"Compassion in Action"	"Lumapit sa Anino"	August 13, 2026	N/A	TBA
40	40	"Silenced"	"Kasunduan"	August 14, 2026	N/A	TBA
41	41	"Becoming the Weapon"	"Pagsasanay"	August 17, 2026	N/A	TBA
42	42	"Ambush"	"Panganib"	August 18, 2026	N/A	TBA
43	43	"The Long Run"	"Tambangan"	August 19, 2026	N/A	TBA
44	44	"Answered Prayer"	"Hulog ng Langit"	August 20, 2026	N/A	TBA
45	45	"Dangerous Crosscurrents"	"Yakap"	August 21, 2026	N/A	TBA
46	46	"Finding Sam"	"Protektado"	August 24, 2026	N/A	TBA
47	47	"Secrets on the Roof"	"Pagpapanggap"	August 25, 2026	N/A	TBA
48	48	"Play Pretend"	"Gloria ni Gabo"	August 26, 2026	N/A	TBA
49	49	"The Disguise"	"Mag-Asawa"	August 27, 2026	N/A	TBA
50	50	"Woman Behind the Anger"	"Bubog"	August 28, 2026	N/A	TBA
51	51	"Through the Neighborhood Eyes"	"Tagu-Taguan"	August 31, 2026	N/A	TBA
52	52	"Growing Attraction"	"Tunay na Intensyon"	September 1, 2026	N/A	TBA
53	53	"Digging Dipper"	"Alamin ang Pagkatao"	September 2, 2026	N/A	TBA
54	54	"Still Searching"	"Paghahanda"	September 3, 2026	N/A	TBA
55	55	"Slowly Settling In"	"Lion"	September 4, 2026	N/A	TBA
56	56	"Caught by Surprise"	"Buking"	September 7, 2026	N/A	TBA
57	57	"The Girl in Yellow"	"Kaarawan"	September 8, 2026	N/A	TBA
58	58	"Blood for Gold"	"Nabighani"	September 9, 2026	N/A	TBA
59	59	"Uninvited Guest"	"Hindi Imbitado"	September 10, 2026	N/A	TBA
60	60	"Breaking Points"	"Pagaalala"	September 11, 2026	N/A	TBA
61	61	"Django's Gambit"	"Kailangan"	September 14, 2026	N/A	TBA
62	62	"False Grave"	"Desisyon"	September 15, 2026	N/A	TBA
63	63	"One Wall Apart"	"Areglo"	September 16, 2026	N/A	TBA
64	64	"Protect the Land"	"Panloloko"	September 17, 2026	N/A	TBA
65	65	"Called to Action"	"Ginintuang Puso"	September 18, 2026	N/A	TBA
66	66	"The Jacket River"	"Ebidensya"	September 21, 2026	N/A	TBA
67	67	"Mourning the Living"	"LOVEbada"	September 22, 2026	N/A	TBA
68	68	"Hidden Motives"	"Impormasyon"	September 23, 2026	N/A	TBA
69	69	"The Long–Haired Decoy"	"Hinala"	September 24, 2026	N/A	TBA
70	70	"Deception"	"Job Interview"	September 25, 2026	N/A	TBA
71	71	"Closer than Intended"	"Mangarap"	September 28, 2026	N/A	TBA
72	72	"Signed Away"	"Utos ni Gloria"	September 29, 2026	N/A	TBA
73	73	"Preparation Begins"	"Maghanda"	September 30, 2026	N/A	TBA
74	74	"While They Mourn"	"Gupit"	October 1, 2026	N/A	TBA
75	75	"Lines of Justice"	"Resbak"	October 2, 2026	N/A	TBA
76	76	"One Community"	"Malasakit"	October 5, 2026	N/A	TBA
77	77	"A Promise to Protect"	"Swerte sa Isa't Isa"	October 6, 2026	N/A	TBA
78	78	"The Price of Goodbye"	"Preparasyon"	October 7, 2026	N/A	TBA
79	79	"Sleep Talking"	"Bagong Bihis"	October 8, 2026	N/A	TBA
80	80	"Take the Lead"	"Hamon"	October 9, 2026	N/A	TBA
81	81	"The Making of an Agent"	"Karapat-Dapat"	October 12, 2026	N/A	TBA
82	82	"The Fist of Anino" (transl. The Fist of Shadow)	"Ang Hinirang"	October 13, 2026	N/A	TBA
83	83	"The Hunting Hunters"	"Taxi Driver"	October 14, 2026	N/A	TBA
84	84	"Hunting the Hunters"	"Target"	October 15, 2026	N/A	TBA
85	85	"Temptation"	"Tukso"	October 16, 2026	N/A	TBA
86	86	"Caught in the Act"	"Mapang-Akit"	October 19, 2026	N/A	TBA
87	87	"A Wife's Jealousy"	"Bisita"	October 20, 2026	N/A	TBA
88	88	"A Dream Exploited"	"Tampuhan"	October 21, 2026	N/A	TBA
89	89	"Cold Shoulders"	"Panunuyo"	October 22, 2026	N/A	TBA
90	90	"Between Love and Duty"	"Papa Love"	October 23, 2026	N/A	TBA
91	91	"Behind the Glamour"	"Illegal Bidding"	October 26, 2026	TBD	TBA
92	92	"Auction of Innocence"	"Iligtas ang mga Babae"	October 27, 2026	TBD	TBA
93	93	"Paying the Price"	"Madugong Engkwentro"	October 28, 2026	TBD	TBA
94	94	"The Shadow that Saves"	"Konsensya"	October 29, 2026	TBD	TBA
95	95	"Choices"	"Mission Accomplished"	October 30, 2026	TBD	TBA
96	96	"Viewers and Listeners"	"Love Advice"	November 2, 2026	TBD	TBA
97	97	"Harana" (transl. Serenade)	"Harana"	November 3, 2026	TBD	TBA
98	98	"First Date"	"Panalangin"	November 4, 2026	TBD	TBA
99	99	"Guarded Heart"	"First Date"	November 5, 2026	TBD	TBA
100	100	"The Acquittal"	"Salisi"	November 6, 2026	TBD	TBA
101	101	"The Scammer"	"Budol"	November 9, 2026	TBD	TBA
102	102	"Man's Bestfriend"	"Panagutin"	November 10, 2026	TBD	TBA
103	103	"The Next Target"	"Bagong Hamon"	November 11, 2026	TBD	TBA
104	104	"Si Gabo at ang Pamilya Jacinto" (transl. Gabo and the Jacinto Family)	"Gabo at Pamilya Jacinto"	November 12, 2026	TBD	TBA
105	105	"An Unwelcome Guest"	"Skullz"	November 13, 2026	TBD	TBA
106	106	"Caught in the Crossfire"	"Mundo ng Skullz"	November 16, 2026	TBD	TBA
107	107	"Ride to Redemption"	"Imbitasyon"	November 17, 2026	TBD	TBA
108	108	"Harm's Way"	"Nagaalala"	November 18, 2026	TBD	TBA
109	109	"Vengeance Comes Home"	"Bumawi"	November 19, 2026	TBD	TBA
110	110	"Hope Amidst Threat"	"Iingatan"	November 20, 2026	TBD	TBA
111	111	TBA	TBA	November 23, 2026	TBD	TBA

== Production ==
=== Development ===
Announced by Coco Martin on February 20, 2026, The series was scheduled to premiere on March 16, 2026, replacing FPJ's Batang Quiapo after its conclusion on March 13, with him and long-time partner, Julia Montes taking the lead roles. Described by Martin as a mix of comedy, drama, romance, and action, the series will feature rotating story arcs and weekly guest appearances. Montes also underwent training in firearms handling, fight scenes and motorcycle riding along with the cast.

=== Casting ===
On May 21, 2026, actor Jerald Napoles said that comedians in the series were allowed to improvise scenes during filming, provided the ad-libs remained consistent with the characters and story. Additional cast are JC de Vera, JM de Guzman, Arci Muñoz, Sue Ramirez, Jhong Hilario, Edu Manzano, Carmi Martin, Chanda Romero, Irma Adlawan and Joey Marquez were joined the series.

=== Filming ===
Principal photography began in early 2026 in Tondo, Manila, but was temporarily halted after Martin granted his production team a break following the extensive filming schedule of FPJ's Batang Quiapo, before production resumed in May 2026.

=== Marketing ===
On June 4, 2026, CCM Film Productions released the official TV series poster of the series. The poster shows lead stars Martin and Montes side-by-side with both of their guns drawn. It was conceptualized by Martin and photographed by Jun De Leon.

== Release ==
The series was originally set to premiere on March 16, 2026. However, it was moved to June 22, 2026, on All TV and Kapamilya Channel as well as other affiliate blocktime channels and online platforms.

== Soundtrack ==
The teaser of the official theme song of the series was also released on social media that was written by Martin and performed by Yeng Constantino.

== Reception ==
=== Ratings ===
According to AGB Nielsen Philippines' Nationwide Urban Television Audience Measurement People in television homes, the pilot episode of Sigabo earned an 8.2% rating.

=== Online viewership ===
Sigabo was a success upon its debut. The pilot week has generated over 33 million digital views across all online platforms and peaked with 404,124 live concurrent viewers on YouTube. On November 17, 2026, the series reached an all-time high of 484,604 live concurrent viewers on YouTube.

== Notes ==
1. Story Arc 1 is indicated as Season 1 on iWant.
