= John Medina (actor) =

Filipino actor (born 1985)

- Born: John Medina; September 5, 1985 (age 41); Quezon City, Philippines
- Other names: John Medina, James Ocampo, Billy Guzman, and Franco de Gallo
- Occupation: Actor
- Years active: 1997–present
- Notable work: Midnight DJ; FPJ's Ang Probinsyano; Sigabo
- Height: 1.70 m (5 ft 7 in)
- Website: John Medina on Instagram

John Medina (born September 5, 1985) is a Filipino actor best known for playing James Ocampo in the 2012 hit primetime teleserye Walang Hanggan, Agustin Magdiwang in Juan dela Cruz, and Billy Guzman in FPJ's Ang Probinsyano on ABS-CBN.

In 2026, he is currently starring in the action-comedy primetime series Coco Martin's Sigabo portrayed role James Borromeo.

== Early life and background ==
Medina's parents separated when he was young. He was primarily raised by his grandmother in Novaliches, Quezon City. He grew up in an environment that valued creative expression, which reportedly encouraged his interest in acting from a young age. He attended both elementary and high school in the Philippines.

== Career ==
Medina started his career as commercial model and bit player. During this period, he met Coco Martin. The two would be reunited in Tayong Dalawa on ABS-CBN and since then would be part of various series starred by Martin for the network. He first played body double to Martin in Minsan Lang Kita Iibigin before landing his biggest role up to that point, that of James Ocampo the henchman of Emily and Daniel in Walang Hanggan. The role came as Medina's big break, with his character's name becoming a top trending topic on Twitter on March 13, 2012 as Medina's James Ocampo defeated Joem Bascon's Tomas Alcantara in a poker game.

Medina would star in further projects with Martin including Juan dela Cruz and Ikaw Lamang before becoming one of the "CIDG Boys" in the longest running action series Ang Probinsyano.

Medina is also handled by the same manager, Biboy Arboleda, as Coco Martin. Medina is active in most Dreamscape Entertainment projects headed by Deo Endrinal.

== Other ventures ==
=== Business ===
Medina stepped into the culinary world by partnering with his mother to revamp her food business, turning it into his primary business venture. Located in Quezon City (specifically along Tomas Morato), PenPen became highly recognized as a celebrity hotspot. Under influence, the establishment shifted its menu to specialize in casual Filipino cuisine crafted with a modern culinary twist. It famously offered localized gimmicks like "Pasta-All-You-Can" weekends and an in-house Movie Club.

=== Public Service and Advocacy Tours ===
Medina is highly active in grassroots public outreach campaigns. Traveling under the #LingkodLapid banner alongside other prominent actors and public figures such as Mark Lapid and Ryan Martin, he participates in regional outreach and tourism promotions throughout the Philippines. These tours have brought him face-to-face with communities across Siargao, Palawan, Cebu, and Zamboanga.

== Personal life ==
Contrary to popular belief, he is not related to fellow actors Pen Medina, Ping Medina and Alex Medina.

== Filmography ==
=== Film ===
Year	Title	Role	Ref.
1997	Too Much Sleep	Bouncer	
2003	Silang Mga Rampadora	—N/a	
2006	Lagot Ka Sa Kuya Ko	Bobby	
2006	TxT	Carinderia Patron 1	
2016	Definitely Divorcing	Raul	
2017	Ang Panday	SPO2 Dela Cruz	
2019	3pol Trobol: Huli Ka Balbon!	Louie	
2022	Labyu with an Accent	Rommel	
2025	Isang Komedya sa Langit	Padre Pascual	

=== Television ===
Year	Title	Role	Ref.
2003	Magpakailanman: Walang Hanggang Pag-Asa: The Nicanor Arañas Story	Paulo	
2004	Magpakailanman: Ikaw at Ako, Walang Iwanan: The Mike 'Pekto' Nacua Story	Jeff	
2004	Ikaw sa Puso Ko	—N/a	
2004	Magpakailanman: Minsan May Isang Anak: The Francine Prieto Story	Michael	
2005	Magpakailanman: Dahil Iginuhit ng Tadhana: The Ruby Rodriguez Story	Herbert Bautista	
2005	Saang Sulok ng Langit	Justin	
2005	Magpakailanman: Till Death Do Us Part: The Katya Santos Story	BJ	
2009	Tayong Dalawa	Franco Walton	
2010	Midnight DJ: Killer Kulambo	Arthur	
2010	Maynila	Boks Big Brother	
2010	Martha Cecilia's Presents: Kristine	Elmer Saavedra	
2011	Minsan Lang Kita Iibigin	1st Lt. Zulueta	
2011	Wansapanataym: Cocoy Shokoy	Coach	
2011	My Binondo Girl	Gieneth	
2012	Walang Hanggan	James Ocampo	
2012	Maalaala Mo Kaya: Flower Shop	Jack	
2013	Juan Dela Cruz	Agustin Magdiwang	
2013	My Little Juan	teen Agustin	
2014	Wansapanataym: Si Lulu At Si Lily Liit	Ricky	
2014	Ikaw Lamang	Juancho	
2014	Ipaglaban Mo: Pagkilala Ng Ama	Fr. Romy	
2014–2015	Two Wives	Albert's Friend	
2015–2022	FPJ's Ang Probinsyano	PCpt. Avel "Billy" M. Guzman	
2017	Wansapanataym: Amazing Ving	Police officer	
2017	Wansapanataym: Jasmin's Flower Powers	Oscar Miraflores	
2018	Ipaglaban Mo: Ate	Erwin	
2018	Maalaala Mo Kaya: Kalabaw	Antonio	
2018	Ipaglaban Mo: Dangal	Junior	
2022–present	ASAP XP	Himself / co-host / Performer	
2024	High Street	Simon Arevalo	
2024–2025	FPJ's Batang Quiapo	Franco de Gallo	
2026	Sigabo	James Borromeo	
