= Labyu with an Accent =

- Theatrical release poster
- Directed by: Malu Sevilla; Rodel Nacianceno (Note: Same person as Coco Martin. Directorial role credited under his name, Rodel P. Nacianceno.)
- Screenplay by: Patrick Valencia; Rodel Nacianceno
- Story by: Rodel Nacianceno
- Produced by: John Leo Datuin Garcia; Carmi G. Raymundo
- Starring: Coco Martin; Jodi Sta. Maria
- Cinematography: Hermann Claravall
- Edited by: Aries Pascual
- Music by: Jessie Lasaten
- Production companies: CCM Creatives; ABS-CBN Films
- Distributed by: Star Cinema
- Release date: December 25, 2022
- Country: Philippines
- Language: Filipino
- Box office: ₱19 million

Labyu with an Accent (transl. "Love You with an Accent") is a 2022 Philippine romantic comedy drama film starring Coco Martin and Jodi Sta. Maria. It was released theatrically on December 25, 2022, as an entry to the 2022 Metro Manila Film Festival.

== Premise ==
Gabo is a man in the Philippines who works multiple jobs, and Trisha is a successful Fil-Am career woman in the U.S. She splits with her boyfriend after catching him cheating on her. Tricia meets Gabo while visiting the Philippines and at the strip club where he works.

== Cast ==
Main cast

- Coco Martin as Gabriel "Gabo" Madlangbayan
- Jodi Sta. Maria as Trisha

Supporting cast

- John Estrada as Larry Madlangbayan
- Michael de Mesa as Walter
- Jaclyn Jose as Linda
- Nova Villa as Lola Tare
- Joross Gamboa as Dave
- Rochelle Pangilinan as Daisy Santos
- G. Toengi as Vivian
- Rafael Rosell as Matt
- Donita Rose as Tess
- Carlo Muñoz as Rolly
- Dale Edward Chung as Dale Chung
- Cheena Crab as Fe
- Nikki Valdez as Pearl
- Zeus Collins as Joko
- Neil Coleta as Buboy
- Jojit Lorenzo as Boy
- Manuel Chua as Jordan
- Nash Aguas as Dino
- JJ Quilantang as Gabo's Nephew
- Iyannah Reyes as Gabo's Niece
- Madam Inutz as UJE Cilent
- Jhai Ho as UJE Cilent
- Marc Solis as Butch
- Jay Gonzaga as Sandro
- John Medina as Rommel
- Bassilyo as Noy
- Smugglaz as Jun Jun

== Production ==
Labyu with an Accent is a film made under ABS-CBN Film Productions, the production outfit of Star Cinema. It is directed by Coco Martin and written by Patrick Valencia. Martin who is also a starring actor of the film, has his directorial role credited under his legal name, Rodel P. Nacianceno rather than his stage name. Martin also consulted fellow director Malu Sevilla for the film.

The film was announced in July 2022 as one of the first four entries submitted as a script for the 2022 Metro Manila Film Festival. The plot for the film was pitched to ABS-CBN by Martin himself who also proposed that Jodi Sta. Maria made his co-starring leading lady. Martin based the story on both his and Sta. Maria's personal experience working abroad. Martin himself worked as an Overseas Filipino Worker in Canada. He created the concept when he was still working with the television series Ang Probinsyano which ended its run in August 2022. This is the second time that Martin drew from his experience as an OFW, as prior to bagging the lead in Ang Probinsyano, Martin was supposed to do a film and a teleserye based around the concept which were both eventually released as Padre de Familia and On the Wings of Love, respectively.

Principal photography sometime after Ang Probinsyano ended airing. Filming took place mostly in Los Angeles in the United States although some scenes were filmed in the Philippines. Martin preferred to work with minimal rehearsals and script guidance for the filming of Labyu with an Accent, believing overreliance on the script "takes away the magic".

Martin presents the film as a gift to followers of his and Sta. Maria's television series Ang Probinsyano and The Broken Marriage Vow.

== Release ==
Labyu with an Accent was released on cinemas in the Philippines on December 25, 2022, as one of the eight official entries of the 2022 Metro Manila Film Festival.

Ticket sales for the Metro Manila Film Festival saw a significant increase, according to the Cinema Exhibitors Association of the Philippines. During the festival, the film ranked 4th in box office sales.
