= 3pol Trobol: Huli Ka Balbon! =

Philippine action-comedy-romance film

- Theatrical release poster
- Directed by: Rodel Nacianceno
- Screenplay by: Rodel Nacianceno; Noreen Capili
- Story by: Rodel Nacianceno
- Produced by: Eileen Angela T. Garcia; Rodel Nacianceno
- Starring: Coco Martin; Ai-Ai delas Alas; Jennylyn Mercado
- Cinematography: Moises Zee
- Edited by: Renewin Alano
- Music by: Jessie Lasaten
- Production company: CCM Film Productions
- Distributed by: Quantum Films
- Release date: December 25, 2019
- Running time: 108 minutes
- Country: Philippines
- Language: Filipino
- Box office: ₱87 million (January 7, 2020)

3pol Trobol: Huli Ka Balbon! (transl. Triple Trouble: Got You Balbon!) is a 2019 Philippine action-comedy-romance film directed by and starring Coco Martin under his real name Rodel Nacianceno, alongside Jennylyn Mercado and Ai-Ai delas Alas.

== Plot ==
Secretary Ernesto Guillermo (Rowell Santiago), the Executive Director of National Defense Agency was murdered and his aide de camp, Apollo "Pol" Balbon (Coco Martin), is blamed for his death by Senator Simon Esguerra (Edu Manzano) and General Damian Calupitan (Tirso Cruz III). Balbon attempts to contact the executive director's daughter Trina (Jennylyn Mercado) to learn about her father's unfinished mission prior to his death. He dresses in drag, as Pauleen Olivia Margaret or Paloma, to take gain her trust. Balbon and Trina escape to Balate, Batangas, where they stay at a home where Pol's other relatives and friends live. While working at the stable own by Yorme (Isko Moreno) who was the former mayor of Balate, Trina was almost raped by the workers and Balbon saves her and they inform him that they are hiding from Senator Simon Esguerra and General Calupitan. Trina later calls Yaya Mi (Mitch Valdes) to get the Ledger on her room, where her father hid it. After finding the Ledger, she goes to Balate, not knowing one of the Senator Esguerra's men are following her and Andrew Esguerra (Sam Milby) Trina's childhood friend informs his father where Pol and Trina is and he and his wife ordered him to get the Ledger and also kill Balbon and Trina. Meanwhile, Yaya Mi finds Balbon and Trina and hands them the Ledger and one of Balbon's relative that Yorme could help them to hand the Ledger to the President. They go to Yorme's house and shows him the Ledger that Senator Esguerra and General Calupitan are responsible for Secretary Guillermo's death and they have to give it to the President and Trina informs that she and Balbon are being man-hunted by Senator Esguerra and General Calupitan and they already taken control of the police. Luckily Yorme reveals himself as an old friend to the President and he will be the one to hand the Ledger to him. Shortly after Yorme left to Manila with the Ledger in tow, Andrew and his men arrive at Balbon's house and captures Trina and one of the Balbon's relatives dashes to Yorme's stable and informs Balbon that Trina has been caught by Andrew's men and he hops on a horse and chases them where it ends at the river which all of Andrew's men are wiped out. Andrew manages to gain the upper hand and almost killed Trina. However, before he could do so, Balbon throws a bamboo spear at Andrew killing him and saving Trina. Meanwhile, Senator Esguerra and General Calupitan are finally arrested by the President, while the fate of Senator Esguerra's wife is unknown, either, she was also arrested for her indirect involvement. With Senator Esguerra and General Calupitan behind bars and Andrew dead, Pol Balbon and Trina are finally married.

== Cast and characters ==
Lead Cast

- Coco Martin as Apollo "Pol" C. Balbon / Paulene Olivia Margaret "Paloma" Guillermo
  - Onyok Pineda as young Pol
- Jennylyn Mercado as Trina Guillermo-Balbon

Supporting Cast

- Ai-Ai delas Alas as Mary Balbon
- Rowell Santiago as Sec. Ernesto Guillermo
- Edu Manzano as Sen. Simon Esguerra
- Sam Milby as Andrew Esguerra
- Tirso Cruz III as Gen. Damian Calupitan
- John Prats as Rudolph "Junior" B. Calvo Jr.
- Joey Marquez as Joseph Pahak
- Mark Lapid as Noel Pahak
- PJ Endrinal as Leonardo Pahak
- Lou Veloso as Ka Tinio Pahak
- Marissa Delgado as Lola Nida Pahak
- Jhong Hilario as Rigor
- Ping Medina as Joaquin
- Mitch Valdes as Minerva "Yaya Mi" Dimasupil
- Liza Lorena as Lola Risa Balbon
- Super Tekla as Boy Balbon / Girlie
- Boobsie Wonderland as Baby Balbon-Calvo
- Jojit Lorenzo as Rudolph "Dong" Calvo
- Carmi Martin as Cristy Esguerra
- Sancho delas Alas as Melchor
- Joven Olvido as Gaspar
- Nonong Ballinan as Baltazar
- Donna Cariaga as Gloria

Special Participation

- Isko Moreno as Yorme
- Pepe Herrera as Tolits
- Long Mejia as Bisoy
- Bianca Manalo as Luningning Calvo
- Marc Solis as Huey
- Lester Llansang as Dewey
- John Medina as Louie
- Lordivino "Bassilyo" Ignacio as Raphael
- Bryan "Smugglaz" Lao as Michelangelo
  - James "Paquito" Sagarino as young Michelangelo
- Anghel "Happy" Marcial as Donatello
- Soliman Cruz as General Garcia
- Kim Molina as Vilma
- Whitney Tyson as Sharon
- Bernard Palanca as Eric
- Ali Khatibi as Jomari
- Paolo Paraiso as Mark
- Ivana Alawi as Stacey
- Al Vaughn Chier Tuliao as Hansel
- Iyannah Joyce Sumalpong as Gretel
- Maynard Lapid as Gen. Eugenio
- Mari Kaimo as The President

Most of the cast members are Martin's colleagues in the action television series Ang Probinsyano.

== Production ==
3pol Trobol: Huli Ka Balbon! was directed by Coco Martin under his own production outfit CCM Productions. Also as one of the co-stars and a producer of the film, Martin's role as director is credited under his real name Rodel Nacianceno. Noreen Capili was the screenwriter3pol Trobol was produced as an "action-comedy-romance film".

== Release ==
3pol Trobol premiered in cinemas across the Philippines on December 25, 2019, as one of the eight official entries to the 2019 Metro Manila Film Festival.

== Reception ==
=== Critical reception ===
Jocelyn Valle of PEP.ph remarked that 3pol Trobol "became a more acceptable film to watch" compared to Martin's previous entry, but noted its formulaic production and premise derived from FPJ's Ang Probinsyano. Both Oggs Cruz of Rappler and Neil Charm of BusinessWorld each gave the film a more critical review, however: Oggs Cruz found Martin's portrayal of the Paloma alter ego, wherein Martin's character uses the Paloma persona to discreetly watch a woman change her clothes or "steal a kiss", "distasteful", and Jennylyn Mercado's character being depicted as a stereotypical damsel in distress "outdated". Neil Charm was also similarly perturbed at the film; while he praised it as an improvement over Martin's previous films, he found the subplot of Pol and his cohorts' perversion, along with scenes of attempted rape "disturbing", hoping "one day Mr. Nacianceno moves on from dirty jokes and using sexual harassment as a trope in his action films." Charm also lamented what he saw as early campaigning on part of Isko Moreno.
