= Neil Coleta =

Filipino actor

- Born: Mark Neilson Mañosca Coleta; August 4, 1991 (age 35); Manila, Philippines
- Education: Adamson University
- Occupations: Actor, TV host
- Years active: 2008–present
- Agent(s): TV5 Network (2008–2009, 2014) Star Magic (2010–2021, 2022–present) GMA Network (2021–2023)
- Political party: Independent (since 2024)
- Children: 1

Mark Neilson Mañosca Coleta (born August 4, 1991), popularly known as Neil Coleta, is a Filipino actor and TV host. He appeared in the TV series Growing Up and 100 Days to Heaven.

== Personal life ==
Coleta graduated from Adamson University. In 2013, his car was hit by another vehicle along Commonwealth Avenue in Quezon City while he was on his way home.

Coleta has a daughter with partner ChinKee Brice.

== Career ==
Coleta started his career in showbiz industry in the Philippines in 2008 and later culminated in 2011. He debuted as a part of the cast of the TV5 show Lipgloss as Caloy Borongan. In 2011, he was later known for doing a television advertisement for Nestea which became publicly recalled by its audience.

Since then, he had done several television projects with ABS-CBN.

In 2012, Coleta starred the film I Do Bidoo Bidoo: Heto nAPO Sila! having a gay role. His work for the film garnered several reviews that made him winning the "New Movie Actor of the Year Award" from the 29th PMPC Star Awards for Movies in 2013. He was also nominated as "Movie Supporting Actor of the Year".

In October 2024, he filed his candidacy for councilor in Dasmariñas, Cavite in the 2025 elections as an independent. He lost, placing 14th with 86,146 votes.

== Filmography ==
=== Film ===
Year	Title	Role	Ref.
2010	Miss You Like Crazy	Mikoy Samonte	
2011	Tumbok	Student	
2012	I Do Bidoo Bidoo: Heto nAPO Sila!	Brent	
2013	My Little Bossings	Dino	
2015	Crazy Beautiful You	Darwin	
2015	The Prenup	Boom Billones	
2018	Kahit Ayaw Mo Na	Tupe	
2021	Princess DayaReese	Denden Termulo	
2022	Labyu with an Accent	Buboy	
2023	Rewind	Wally	

=== Television ===
Year	Title	Role	Ref.
2008	Lipgloss	Caloy Borongan	
2010	Rosalka	Randy	
2011	100 Days to Heaven	Jopet Lim	
2011–2012	Growing Up	Tikoy Navarro	
2012	Toda Max	Carding	
2012	Maalaala Mo Kaya: Bahay	Bong	
2012	Maalaala Mo Kaya: Kandila	Sonny	
2012–2013	Aryana	Andoy Capuyao	
2013	My Little Juan	Asiong	
2013	Juan Dela Cruz	Asiong	
2013	Maalaala Mo Kaya: Family Picture	Rainier	
2014	Mars Ravelo's Dyesebel	Alvin	
2014	Wattpad Presents		
2014	Ikaw Lamang	young Roger	
2015	Ipaglaban Mo	Gary	
2015	Maalaala Mo Kaya: Korona	Ramon	
2015	Kapamilya, Deal or No Deal	Briefcase Number 9	
2015–2016	And I Love You So	Butch	
2015–2021	FPJ's Ang Probinsyano	Miguel Clemente	
2016	Born For You	Petrick	
2017	My Dear Heart	Kevin	
2017	La Luna Sangre	Umang	
2017–2018	Wansapanataym: Jasmin's Flower Powers	Rey	
2018	The Blood Sisters	Ondoy	
2018	Maalaala Mo Kaya: Ukelele	Andrew	
2018	Wansapanataym: Ikaw Ang Ghosto Ko	Casper	
2019	Ipaglaban Mo: Lulong	Gio	
2019	The Killer Bride	Intoy Ilagan	
2019	Starla	young Domeng	
2021	Maalaala Mo Kaya: Tungkod	Radi	
2021	Imbestigador	Ricky Boy Colarte	
2022	Widows' Web	Julius Collado	
2022	Mars Ravelo's Darna	Vincent Eugenio / Clone Man	
2023	Imbestigador: Finale	Romeo	
2024–2026	FPJ's Batang Quiapo	Obet	
2026	Sigabo	Oli	
