= Daybreak (2008 film) =

- Directed by: Adolfo B. Alix, Jr.
- Written by: Charliebebs S. Gohetia
- Produced by: Noel Ferrer
- Starring: Coco Martin; Paolo Rivero
- Cinematography: Albert Banzon
- Edited by: Charliebebs S. Gohetia
- Music by: Nani Naguit
- Production company: Bicycle Pictures
- Distributed by: GMA Films (Philippines)
- Release date: February 20, 2008
- Running time: 75 minutes
- Country: Philippines
- Language: Filipino
- Box office: ₱151,026.33

Daybreak (Filipino: Bukang-liwayway, English: dawn or twilight) is a 2008 Philippine gay indie film written by Charliebebs Gohetia and directed by the Manila-based Filipino director Adolfo Borinaga Alix Jr. who also directed other indie films such as Donsol, Kadin and GMA Films' movie Batanes: Sa Dulo Ng Walang Hanggan. The movie features only two characters, Coco Martin (as JP) and Paolo Rivero (as William) who are both Filipino actors. The film is homosexual in terms of theme but was rated R-18 uncut, regardless of its nudity features by the Movie and Television Review and Classification Board (MTRCB) in the Philippines as most of the members of the board were impressed by the cinematography and intelligence of the film. Daybreak had its exclusive screenings on February 13 and 14, 2008 at the Cine Adarna of the University of the Philippines Film Institute. The movie was officially released and aired in major Philippine cinemas from February 20 to March 11, 2008. Daybreak is produced by Bicycle Productions.

== Introduction ==
The whole movie occurs entirely in one place; a big white vacation house in Tagaytay, Cavite and only with two male characters. In a single narrative time, intending by way of voyeurism, the film allows viewers to discover what happens when two men spend one night contemplating whether to break up or continue their relationship.

According to the Philippine Entertainment Portal, Daybreak is not a typical gay love story because of the complicated situation it conveys and the extremely difficult roles played by Coco Martin d Paolo Rivero.

== Synopsis ==
A married man is having an affair with another man. After some time apart, the two men spend a night together in a family vacation home in Tagaytay, Cavite. Together in such close quarters, the two are left with nothing to do but to confront the realities of their relationship.

The movie opens with William (Paolo Rivero), a doctor, driving up to Tagaytay to meet his secret lover JP (Coco Martin), a handsome young fellow in his mid-twenties. While driving, William had been engaged in a cell phone conversation with his wife, who was asking when he will return home. William made up an alibi saying that he has an unexpected appointment in Tagaytay and will probably be back in Manila the next day.

On the other hand, JP was waiting in a public viewing park of the Taal Volcano to join William in his Tagaytay escapade. JP is a local boatman and tour guide in Taal, Batangas and William's secret lover for a year now. Although it was not specifically reiterated in the movie, listening to their dialogue, one will learn that the two men obviously met during one of William and his wife's visits to Taal Volcano. If William has a wife, JP has a girlfriend.

The two did not see each other for two months partly because William is very busy being a Makati physician and partly because he is a family man. JP, on the other hand, had spent two months secretly waiting for William while keeping himself busy with his boating job and his girlfriend. Deep inside, the two lovers missed each other.

When they reach the rest house, William cooks pasta and they eat and drink wine together. It is to be, however, the last night that the two lovers will be together as William is scheduled to leave for Australia. William wants to call it quits but doesn't know how to break the news to JP, who is already emotionally attached to him although they really didn't have an agreement that they are indeed a couple.

The tension starts when William tells JP that he's leaving the country. Several scenes and dialogue lead up to the climax as JP is reluctant to accept the fact that it was the end of their relationship. The two men had spent the night talking about their past including happy and unforgettable memories while browsing their pictures.

They spend a night together where they and have another affair. However, when the night is over, William remains firm to his decision and leaves for Australia after ending his relationship with JP.

The movie ends as William is driving back to Manila again, and JP, alone in the nocturnal Tagaytay rest house, is numb to the truth that their relationship is doomed in just one night.
