= Ronwaldo Martin =

Filipino film and television actor

- Born: Ronwaldo Pacheco Nacianceno; July 14, 1997 (age 29); Manila, Philippines
- Other name: Ron Martin
- Occupation: Actor
- Years active: 2014–present
- Agent: ABS-CBN Studios (2017–2019; 2022–present)
- Relatives: Coco Martin (brother); Ryan Martin (brother)

Ronwaldo Pacheco Nacianceno (born July 14, 1997), known professionally as Ronwaldo Martin, is a Filipino film and television actor. He is the brother of Coco Martin.

== Early life and education ==
Martin is the son of Ramon S. Nacianceno and Maria Teresa C. Nacianceno. Growing up, he and his siblings, including older brother Ryan Martin, were raised in a family that would later become a significant presence in the Philippine entertainment industry. Martin Despite these challenges, he completed his studies at the National College of Business and Arts (NCBA) in Fairview, Quezon City, earning a degree in Hotel and Restaurant Management.

== Career ==
He won the Best Actor trophy at the Harlem International Film Festival for his portrayal in Pamilya Ordinaryo.

He has also appeared in the TV drama Batang Quiapo, which stars and is directed by his elder brother Coco Martin.

== Filmography ==
=== Films ===
Year	Title	Role
2014	Kasal	Bong
2014	Tumbang Preso	
2014	Social Virus	Matthie
2015	Ari: My Life with a King	Jaypee
2015	Caretaker	Short
2016	Laut	
2016	Tuos	Dapu-An
2016	Pamilya Ordinaryo	Aries
2016	Kabisera	Arnold
2017	Bhoy Intsik	
2017	Baklad	Tutoy
2017	Sorry for the Inconvenience	
2017	Ang Panday	Flavio's friend
2018	1957	Lucio
2018	Tres	Roy Pelaez
2018	Jack Em Popoy: The Puliscredibles	Rico
2019	Kaputol	Conard
2022	Apag	Nognog
2025	Lola Barang	—N/a

=== Television ===
Year	Title	Role
2017–2019	FPJ’s Ang Probinsyano	Roldan / Gagamba
2023	It's Showtime	Himself / Guest performer
2023–2026	FPJ’s Batang Quiapo	Santino Guerrero-Dimaguiba
2024–present	ASAP XP	Himself / Co-host / Performer
2026	Sigabo	Lucas Zafra credited as Ron Martin

=== Music video ===
Year	Title	Notes
2023	ABS-CBN Christmas Special ID 2023: Pasko ang Pinakamagandang Kwento	Director

== Awards and nominations ==
Year	Category	Movie	Organization	Result	Ref.
2017	Best Actor	Pamilya Ordinaryo	Harlem International Film Festival	Won	
2017	Best Actor	Pamilya Ordinaryo	Gawad Urian	Nominated	
2017	Best Actor	Pamilya Ordinaryo	Star Awards	Nominated	
2017	Best Actor	Pamilya Ordinaryo	Entertainment Editors' Choice Awards	Nominated	
2019	Best Actor	1957	Subic Bay International Film Festival	Won	
