= Izzy Canillo =

Filipino actor

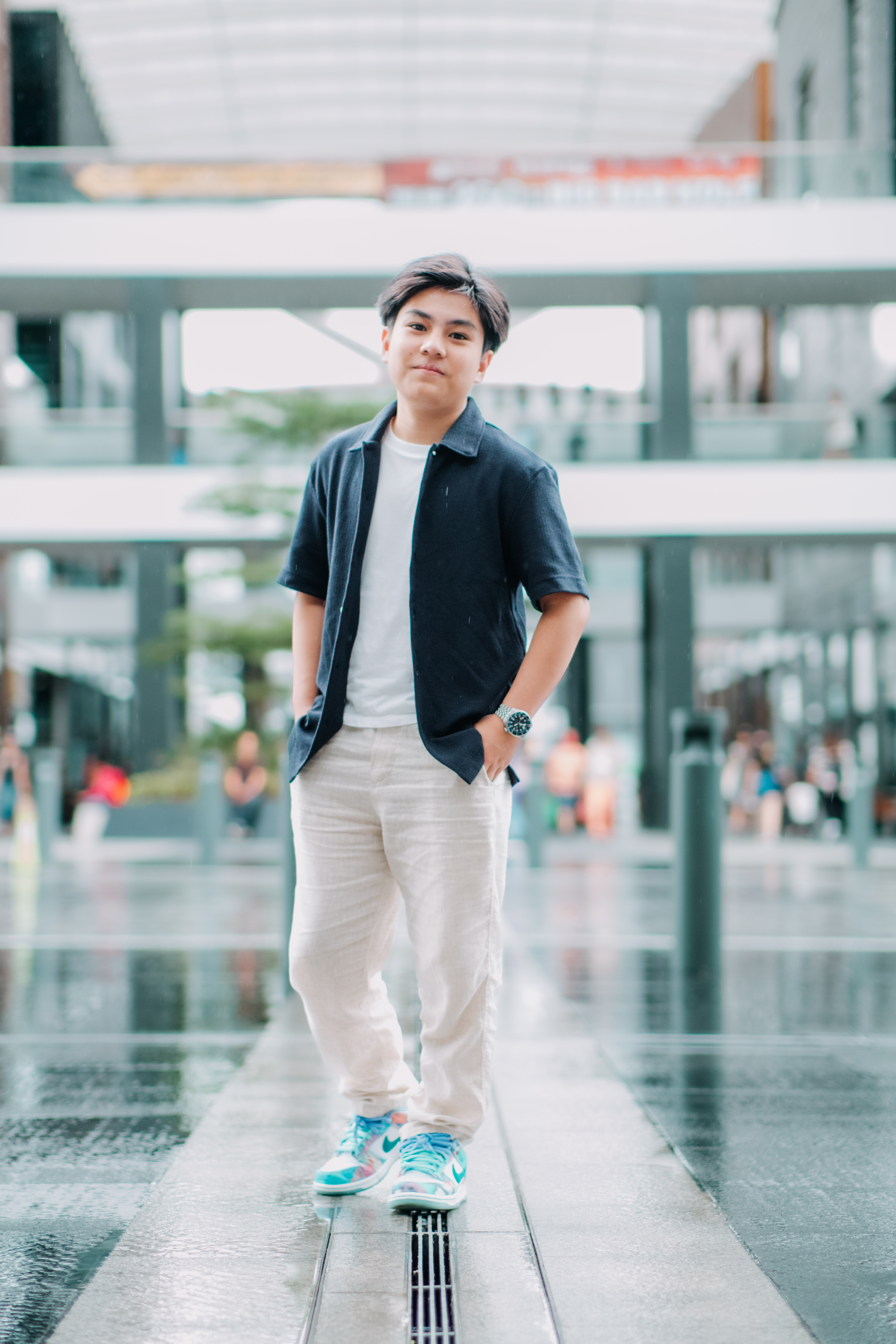
- Born: John Izzy Maurillo Canillo; March 3, 2004 (age 22); Quezon City, Philippines
- Education: Angelicum College
- Occupation: Actor
- Years active: 2009–present
- Agents: Star Magic (2009–2021); Freelancer (2021–present)

John Izzy Maurillo Canillo (born March 3, 2004) is a Filipino actor. He was discovered by Star Circle Quest in 2009, winning first runner up. He was nominated for the PMPC Best Children's Show Host Award in 2010.

As part of ABS-CBN's 60th anniversary celebration, he was offered a role in the fantasy-drama My Little Juan, and the follow-up to the television series, Juan dela Cruz. He also performs in mall shows.

== Filmography ==
=== Television series ===
| Year | Title | Role |
|---|---|---|
| 2010 | Maalaala Mo Kaya "Tsinelas" | Loy |
| 2010 | Maalaala Mo Kaya "Bimpo" | John |
| 2010 | Maalaala Mo Kaya "Litrato" | Cliff |
| 2010 | Kung Tayo'y Magkakalayo | young Ringgo |
| 2010 | The Wedding | young Warren |
| 2010 | Impostor | Joshua Florencio |
| 2010 | Mara Clara | young Karlo |
| 2011 | Mutya | young Aries |
| 2011 | Wansapanataym "Bully-Lit" | young Boyong |
| 2011 | Mula sa Puso | young Warren |
| 2011 | Maalaala Mo Kaya "Tulay" | five-year-old Nikko Mataro |
| 2011 | Guns and Roses | child Marcus Aguilar |
| 2011 | My Binondo Girl | young Onyx |
| 2011 | Ikaw ay Pag-Ibig | Jackstone |
| 2012 | Maalaala Mo Kaya "Singsing" | young Bimboy |
| 2012 | Wansapanataym "Plastik Pantastik" | Duwende |
| 2012 | Princess and I | MacMac |
| 2013 | Juan dela Cruz | young Juan dela Cruz |
| 2013 | My Little Juan | Juan dela Cruz |
| 2013 | Wansapanataym "Moomoo Knows Best" | Kwatzy |
| 2014 | Maalaala Mo Kaya "Tutong" | Boy |
| 2014 | Dyesebel | Mako |
| 2014 | Ipaglaban Mo "Hindi Ko Sinasadya, Yaya" | RJ |
| 2014 | Maalaala Mo Kaya "Saklay" | young Johnny |
| 2015 | Bridges of Love | young Manuel "JR" Nakpil Jr. |
| 2015 | Inday Bote | Anthony "Tonyo" Catacutan |
| 2015 | FPJ's Ang Probinsyano | young Cardo/Ador de Leon |
| 2015 | Wansapanataym "Percy Maninisi" | Joseph |
| 2016 | Maalaala Mo Kaya "Family Picture" | Rasul |
| 2017 | Wildflower | young Arnaldo Torillo |
| 2017 | My Dear Heart | Goyong |
| 2018 | Maalaala Mo Kaya "Youth Citizen" | young Bill Felisan |
| 2019 | Nang Ngumiti ang Langit | young Michael Villaluna |
| 2021 | Ang sa Iyo ay Akin | young Avel |
| 2021 | Walang Hanggang Paalam | young Anton |
| 2021 | Huwag Kang Mangamba | young Miguel |
| 2021 | Maalaala Mo Kaya "Sobre" | young Jose Delos Santos |
| 2021 | The World Between Us | young Luisito "Louie" Asuncion |
| 2021 | Marry Me, Marry You | young Andrei Legaspi |
| 2021 | Niña Niño | Ethan |

=== Television shows ===
| Year | Title | Role |
|---|---|---|
| 2009 | Star Circle Quest | Himself/Contestant/1st Runner-Up |
| 2010 | Kulilits | Host |
| 2011 | Happy Yipee Yehey! | Himself/Guest Performer |
| 2011–2013 | Toda Max | Ron-Ron Batumbakal |
| 2011–2017 | Goin' Bulilit | Himself |
| 2013 | Minute To Win It | Himself/Contestant |
| 2026 | Rainbow Rumble | Himself/Contestant |

=== Feature films ===
| Year | Title | Role |
|---|---|---|
| 2012 | Born to Love You | young Rex |
| 2012 | The Healing | Bughaw |
| 2024 | My Future You | Troy |

== Awards and nominations ==
| Year | Award giving body | Category | Nominated work | Result |
|---|---|---|---|---|
| 2013 | 27th PMPC Star Awards for TV | Best Child Performer | My Little Juan | Nominated |
