= Ikaw Lamang =

2014 Philippine television drama series

- Title card
- Also known as: No Greater Love
- Genre: Period drama; Romance; Epic; Melodrama
- Created by: ABS-CBN Studios: Rondel P. Lindayag; Reggie Amigo
- Developed by: ABS-CBN Studios: Roldeo T. Endrinal; Julie Anne R. Benitez
- Written by: Danica Mae S. Domingo; David Franche Diuco; Hazel Karyl Madanguit; Jose A. Dizon Jr.
- Directed by: Malu L. Sevilla; Avel E. Sunpongco; Manny Q. Palo
- Creative director: Johnny delos Santos
- Starring: Coco Martin; Kim Chiu; Julia Montes; Jake Cuenca; KC Concepcion
- Music by: Idonnah Lopez-Villarico; Rommel Villarico
- Opening theme: "Ikaw Lamang" by Gary Valenciano and Angeline Quinto
- Composers: Ogie Alcasid; Dodjie Simon
- Country of origin: Philippines
- Original language: Filipino
- No. of seasons: 2
- No. of episodes: 162

Production
- Executive producers: Carlo Katigbak; Cory Vidanes; Laurenti Dyogi; Roldeo Endrinal
- Producers: Eileen Angela T. Garcia; Hazel Bolisay Parfan; Maya Aralar; Dagang Vilbar; Ethel M. Espiritu
- Production location: Philippines
- Cinematography: George Tutanes; Eli Balce
- Editor: Froilan Francia
- Running time: 30-45 minutes
- Production companies: Dreamscape Entertainment Television; CCM Creatives

Original release
- Network: ABS-CBN
- Release: March 10 – October 24, 2014

Ikaw Lamang (International title: No Greater Love / transl. only you) is a 2014 Philippine television drama series broadcast by ABS-CBN. Directed by Malu L. Sevilla, Avel E. Sunpongco and Manny Q. Palo, it stars Kim Chiu and Coco Martin, Julia Montes, Jake Cuenca and KC Concepcion. It aired on the network's Primetime Bida line up and worldwide on TFC from March 10 to October 24, 2014, replacing Got to Believe and was replaced by Forevermore.

The entire first season followed the lives of Samuel (Coco Martin), Isabel (Kim Chiu), Mona (Julia Montes) and Franco (Jake Cuenca) encompassing the period between 1964-1984. It ran from March 10 to August 15, 2014 with a total of 112 episodes.

In the second season, the story revolved around Gabriel (Coco Martin), Andrea (Kim Chiu), and Natalia (KC Concepcion) and is set in the year 2005, with brief flashbacks from the 1990s. It aired from August 18 to October 24, 2014 with 50 episodes.

== Plot ==
=== 1950s ===
Eduardo Hidalgo (Tirso Cruz III), a wealthy landowner based in Salvacion, Negros Island, has a relationship with one of the workers in his plantation, Elena Severino (Cherry Pie Picache). However, when Maximo Salazar (Ronaldo Valdez), the butler in the hacienda of the Hidalgos, learns that Elena is pregnant, he manipulates a robbery in which Elena is unjustly implicated, causing her to be imprisoned only to be released on the condition that she leaves Salvacion. Eduardo marries Maximo's daughter Miranda (Cherie Gil), unaware that Elena is pregnant with her son with him. Elena and Miranda give birth to their respective children named Samuel and Franco, with the latter not being Eduardo's biological son but that of a beauty contest judge. Luis (William Lorenzo) assumes the role of a father to Samuel but dies later on. With a heavy heart, however, Elena and her family are forced to return to Salvacion in the years that follow.

=== 1960s ===
In the era of the sugar industry boom in the small town of Salvacion, two children from opposite sides of society will meet: the young Samuel Severino (Zaijian Jaranilla) and Isabel Miravelez (Alyanna Angeles). Samuel is the son of sugarcane plantation worker Elena, while Isabel is the daughter of wealthy couple Gonzalo (John Estrada) and Rebecca Miravelez (Angel Aquino). Through Isabel, Samuel meets Franco Hidalgo (Louise Abuel), the son of wealthy landowners Miranda and Eduardo. A natural-born farmer, Samuel teaches Franco how to plant sugar cane and in return, Franco teaches Samuel how to read.

One night, a wild fire strikes the sugar cane field. Amidst the tragedy, Samuel is able to save Isabel. However, with the influence of his grandfather Maximo, Franco claims he was the one who saved Isabel. Relentless in their pursuit to know the truth as to who was behind the fire, Gonzalo and his right-hand man Pacquito (Ronnie Lazaro) was able to pinpoint a farmer as the culprit. To prove that the farmer was innocent, Samuel reveals that he was there when the fire happened and told everyone that he was the one who saved Isabel. This ignites a rivalry between Samuel and Franco.

=== 1970s ===
After studying in London, Isabel (Kim Chiu) and Franco (Jake Cuenca) return to Salvacion. Meanwhile, Mona Roque (Julia Montes), the loyal friend and secret admirer of Samuel (Coco Martin), also returns to Salvacion from Manila where she studied. Samuel, on the other hand, continues his fight for the injustices against the workers. In the midst of this social turmoil, love develops between Samuel and Isabel, to the consternation of Franco and Mona.

A planned elopement and wedding between Samuel and Isabel is foiled by Gonzalo and Maximo, in favor of Franco. Samuel is abducted, electrocuted and buried alive, but a priest saves him. Isabel ends up marrying Franco. Mona seduces a drunk, heartbroken Samuel; their one night stand eventually results in their marriage and the birth of their son named Gabriel, while Isabel and Franco are blessed with a daughter named Natalia Isabel.

Things get worse when Eduardo reveals that he is the biological father of Samuel. In addition, Rebecca divulges Franco's real identity. Maximo accidentally kills Miranda during a gunfight between him and Gonzalo, and is subsequently imprisoned as a result.

Franco suffers an accident but despite recovering, he pretends to be crippled in order to gain the sympathy of others, especially Isabel. Isabel becomes pregnant with Franco's second child but Franco believes that this child is Samuel's. Franco is able to make Mona and the townspeople believe in a lie, causing a jealous Mona to flee Salvacion with Gabriel despite not having the permission of her family. Samuel catches up with them and joins them along with Lupe and Calixto to Manila. While in Manila, Samuel and Mona enter university while fulfilling their duties as Gabriel's parents at the same time.

Franco decides to run as Mayor of Salvacion, while Eduardo seeks another term as governor. They both emerge victorious.

=== 1980s ===
The plantation workers hold massive protests against Franco, who was then the corrupt mayor of their town. Samuel is implicated in their so-called rebellion and is arrested and tortured, only to be released as Eduardo leads a hunger strike. Eduardo, who had remarried to Elena, supports their son's gubernatorial bid against Franco, who is backed by Maximo. During the election, Mona is killed in an ambush ordered by Maximo, who also helps Franco cheat his way to victory. Gonzalo anonymously divulges Maximo's dishonest acts, but is caught, captured, and beaten by the latter and his men.

Gonzalo manages to escape Maximo's men, and files cases against the old man. Maximo is captured and detained following a police operation. He had aimed his gun at Samuel but Eduardo was hit by the bullets and dies later that night. Maximo attempts to escape jail by bribing the police chief and faking his death, but his attempt becomes unsuccessful as Gonzalo and Pacquito intercept his hearse. Gonzalo opens Maximo's coffin and buries Maximo alive along with his gold bars and venomous snakes even as the latter pleads for his life and offers to pay him.

Before the protests and elections, Maximo is released as a result of a presidential pardon, and vows to bring down his rivals. He orders the burning of the Miravelez mansion. As a result, Isabel prematurely gives birth to Andrea. However, Franco believes the child is Isabel's illegitimate child with Samuel. Franco abuses Isabel and uses his children to keep her from leaving.

To save Isabel from Franco's battering, Samuel plans to flee to Manila with Natalia and Andrea.

Franco learns of the plan and manages to get Natalia from Isabel. On the night of their elopement, Franco plants a bomb on the ship where Samuel, Isabel, and their families and friends are taking going to Manila. The bomb explodes. Samuel, Isabel, Gabriel, and Andrea find themselves losing their beloved ones and separated by fate. Gonzalo told Gabriel that he is the only one will end Franco's evilness for which he kept before looking for his father.

In the aftermath of the explosion, a dying Elena gives Andrea to Roger (Neil Coleta) and Esther Sanggalang (Marlann Flores) who then raise her; not knowing the real identity of the little girl, they name her Jacqueline after their deceased daughter. Elena, her parents Damian and Trinidad Severino, Gonzalo and Rebecca all perished in the ship explosion, and Gabriel is left to the care of Mona's sister Lupe Roque (Meryll Soriano) and her friend (and future husband) Calixto de la Cruz (Lester Llansang). Days later, an old lady finds Isabel and takes care of her, while Samuel confronts Franco and is unjustly imprisoned for 20 years.

=== 1990s ===
Lupe (Rio Locsin) and Calixto (Nonie Buencamino) moved to Manila along with Gabriel (Yogo Singh) and their newborn daughter Darlene, after learning that Franco had engaged in land grabbing of Samuel's properties. Gabriel grows to become a quarrelsome boy, planting the seeds of his revenge against Franco.

=== 2000s ===
Franco (Christopher de Leon) walks away with impunity, having been elected as senator and interested in the presidency. Gabriel (Coco Martin) begins his revenge against him by sabotaging Natalia's (KC Concepcion) wedding to James (Bryan Santos) as he produces photos showing the latter flirting with another woman.

A kind-hearted jail warden named Roman (Dennis Padilla) helps Samuel (Joel Torre) escape from jail. Samuel eventually locates Calixto, Lupe, and Gabriel. In order to begin life anew and help Gabriel exact revenge against Franco, Samuel and Calixto briefly return to Salvacion to dig and sell the gold bars that were buried with Maximo when he was buried alive by Gonzalo and Pacquito before the ship explosion.

Isabel (Amy Austria-Ventura), introducing herself as Dolores, helps Esther (Arlene Muhlach) after the latter collapses in a public market. She becomes friends with Esther and Roger (Smokey Manaloto), and later meets Jacq (Kim Chiu), whom she is able to recognize as her daughter Andrea.

Gabriel enters into a relationship with Natalia, only to destroy it later on in favor of Jacq – whose real identity Gabriel is not yet aware of – as part of his revenge against Franco. While courting Natalia, Gabriel follows her to Salvacion, accompanied by Jacq. Natalia informs her father's chief of staff and mistress Tessa (Mylene Dizon) about somebody who looks like her mother. The paths of Franco and Jacq then cross as a DNA test confirms a father-daughter relationship between them.

Franco holds a party introducing Andrea as his daughter. Isabel sneaks into the party and Franco sees her, only for the former to make the latter believe that she has amnesia. Franco lets his wife and children live in the same home, but locks up Isabel and Andrea to prevent them from escaping again. Natalia got into a fight with Isabel and Andrea. Later on, Franco came and stopped it by slapping Natalia. Isabel then tells Andrea the whole truth about herself and Franco. Unluckily, Tessa recorded their discussion in which they plan to escape with Natalia. Franco forces Isabel to renew their vows, but Isabel continues her act of fake amnesia, telling him that they should not go too fast into renewing the vows because it is a decision for two people. During this occasion, Samuel and Gabriel successfully rescue Andrea and Isabel, but the following day, Natalia can only helplessly watch as Franco ruthlessly murders Samuel.

Charges of murder, falsification of documents, and domestic violence are filed against Franco, but despite a legislative inquiry and the issuance of a warrant of arrest against him by the NBI, he refuses to surrender, holding Andrea hostage. Remembering what Gonzalo said to him before his death, Franco and Gabriel go on a duel in a ship, but Franco falls off the ship to his death after getting pierced by the ship's anchor. In the end, Andrea marries Gabriel and it is implied that Gabriel has regained the land in Salvacion that Franco took away from his family.

== Cast and characters ==
=== Book 1 ===
==== Lead cast ====
- Coco Martin as Samuel S. Hidalgo
- Kim Chiu as Isabel Miravelez-Hidalgo
- Jake Cuenca as Franco S. Hidalgo
- Julia Montes as Monalisa "Mona" Roque-Hidalgo

==== Main cast ====
- Cherie Gil as Señora Miranda Salazar-Hidalgo
- Cherry Pie Picache as Señora Elena Severino-Hidalgo
- Angel Aquino as Señora Rebecca Miravelez
- John Estrada as Don Gonzalo Miravelez
- Ronaldo Valdez as Don Maximo Salazar
- Tirso Cruz III as Gov. Eduardo Hidalgo

==== Supporting cast ====
- Daria Ramirez as Trinidad Severino
- Ronnie Lazaro as Pacquito Roque
- Spanky Manikan as Damian Severino
- Meryll Soriano as Guadalupe "Lupe" Roque
- Lester Llansang as Calixto Dela Cruz
- Simon Ibarra as Romeo Dela Cruz
- Tiya Pusit as Soledad
- Vangie Labalan as Conchita
- John Medina as Juancho

==== Guest cast ====
- William Lorenzo as Luis San Gabriel
- Marita Zobel as Victoria Miravelez
- Melai Cantiveros as Monica Miravelez

==== Special participation ====
- Xyriel Manabat as young Mona
- Louise Abuel as young Franco
- Alyanna Angeles as young Isabel
- Zaijian Jaranilla as young Samuel
- Ella Cruz as young Lupe
- JB Agustin as young Calixto
- Jana Agoncillo as young Natalia
- Zach Briz as young Gabriel
- Gabrielle Patrish Nagayama as young Andrea

=== Book 2 ===
==== Lead cast ====
- Coco Martin as Gabriel R. Hidalgo
- Kim Chiu as Andrea Rebecca M. Hidalgo / Jacqueline "Jacq" Sanggalang
- KC Concepcion as Natalia Isabel M. Hidalgo

==== Main cast ====
- Amy Austria Ventura as Isabel Miravelez-Hidalgo / Dolores Mondigo
- Joel Torre as Samuel S. Hidalgo
- Christopher de Leon as Sen. Franco S. Hidalgo
- Rio Locsin as Guadalupe "Lupe" Roque-Dela Cruz
- Mylene Dizon as Tessa Villanueva
- Nonie Buencamino as Calixto Dela Cruz
- Smokey Manaloto as Roger Sanggalang
- Jojit Lorenzo as Mark Villanueva
- Arlene Muhlach as Esther Sanggalang

==== Supporting cast ====
- Dennis Padilla as Roman Evangelista
- Bryan Santos as James Lorenzo
- Mikylla Ramirez as Darlene R. Dela Cruz

==== Guest cast ====
- Yogo Singh as young Gabriel
- Marlann Flores as young Esther
- Neil Coleta as young Roger
- Ruby Ruiz as Marciana
- Vangie Labalan as Conchita

== Reception ==
=== Ratings ===
Kantar Media National TV Ratings (8:45PM PST)
Pilot Episode	Finale Episode	Peak	Average
27.4% March 10, 2014	34.1% October 24, 2014	34.1% October 24, 2014	TBD

=== Awards and nominations ===
Year	Award-giving body	Category	Recipient	Result	Ref
2014	28th PMPC Star Awards for TV	Best Primetime Drama Series	Ikaw Lamang	Won	
2014	28th PMPC Star Awards for TV	Best Drama Actor	Coco Martin	Won	
2014	28th PMPC Star Awards for TV	Best Drama Actress	Kim Chiu	Won	
2014	28th PMPC Star Awards for TV	Best Drama Supporting Actor	Jake Cuenca	Nominated	
2014	28th PMPC Star Awards for TV	Best Drama Supporting Actor	John Estrada	Won	
2014	28th PMPC Star Awards for TV	Best Drama Supporting Actor	Joel Torre	Nominated	
2014	28th PMPC Star Awards for TV	Best Drama Supporting Actor	Ronaldo Valdez	Nominated	
2014	28th PMPC Star Awards for TV	Best Drama Supporting Actor	Tirso Cruz III	Nominated	
2014	28th PMPC Star Awards for TV	Best Drama Supporting Actor	Christopher de Leon	Nominated	
2014	28th PMPC Star Awards for TV	Best Drama Supporting Actress	KC Concepcion	Won	
2014	28th PMPC Star Awards for TV	Best Drama Supporting Actress	Julia Montes	Nominated	
2014	28th PMPC Star Awards for TV	Best Drama Supporting Actress	Angel Aquino	Nominated	
2014	28th PMPC Star Awards for TV	Best Drama Supporting Actress	Cherry Pie Picache	Nominated	
2014	28th PMPC Star Awards for TV	Best Drama Supporting Actress	Amy Austria-Ventura	Nominated	
2015	13th Gawad Tanglaw Awards	Best TV Series	Ikaw Lamang	Won	
2015	13th Gawad Tanglaw Awards	Best Performance by an Actor (TV Series)	Coco Martin	Won	
2015	13th Gawad Tanglaw Awards	Best Performance by an Actress (TV Series)	Julia Montes	Won	

== Soundtrack ==
Ikaw Lamang: The Official Soundtrack

Soundtrack album by Various Artists
- Released: 2014
- Genre: Manila Sound, Standard
- Length: 28:51
- Label: Star Music

No.	Title	Writer(s)	Artist(s)	Length
1.	"Ikaw Lamang" (Teleserye Version)	Ogie Alcasid	Gary Valenciano	4:37
2.	"Somewhere" (Classic Version)	Leonard Bernstein and Stephen Sondheim	Angeline Quinto	4:03
3.	"Pers Lab"	Ramon Torralba and Dennis Garcia	Marion Aunor	2:45
4.	"Sa Aking Pag-Iisa"	Snaffu Rigor	Juris	3:06
5.	"Panaginip"	Lorrie Illustre and Dennis Garcia	Erik Santos	3:32
6.	"Pangako"	Danny Subido	Jovit Baldivino	3:03
7.	"Somewhere" (Standard Version)	Leonard Bernstein and Stephen Sondheim	KZ Tandingan	3:10
8.	"Ikaw Lamang" (Teleserye Version - Minus One)	Ogie Alcasid		4:35
Total length:				28:51

== Reruns ==
The show began airing re-runs on Jeepney TV from April 30 to July 20, 2018; October 30, 2021 to October 8, 2022 and December 28, 2024 to May 25, 2025.

== See also ==
- List of programs broadcast by ABS-CBN
- List of ABS-CBN Studios original drama series
- List of programs broadcast by Jeepney TV
