= Coco Martin =

Filipino actor and filmmaker (born 1981)

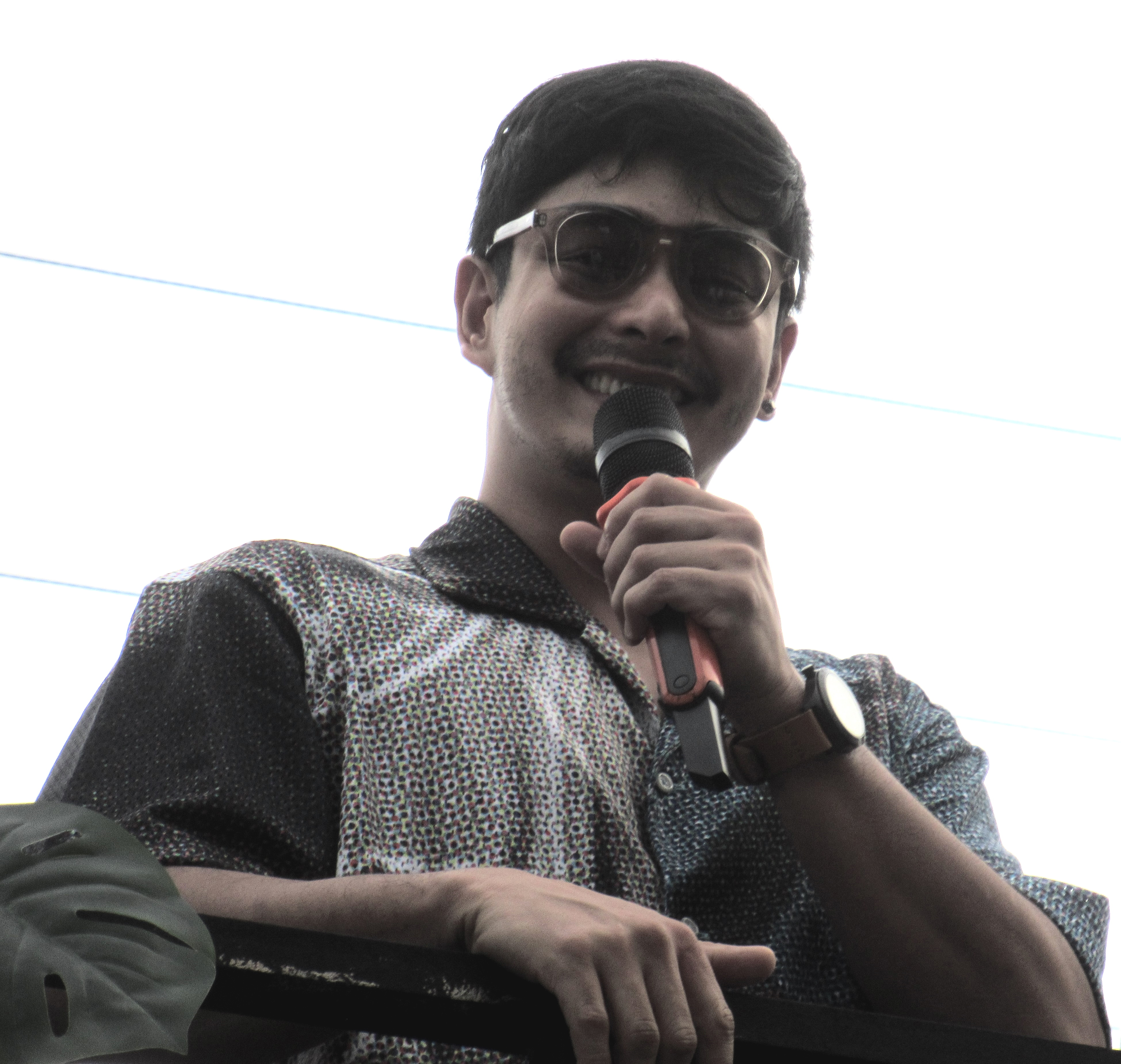
- Martin in 2022
- Born: Rodel Pacheco Nacianceno; November 1, 1981 (age 45); Santa Cruz, Manila, Philippines
- Other name: Rodel Nacianceno (Note: Martin is credited as "Rodel Nacianceno" for his directorial and production credits in his films, but is still credited as "Coco Martin" for his acting credits.)
- Education: National College of Business and Arts (BS)
- Occupations: Actor; director; producer; screenwriter
- Years active: 1998–present
- Agent(s): ABS-CBN Corporation (1999–2002, 2008–present) (Note: Under Star Magic from 1999 to 2002 and 2008 to 2016, ABS-CBN Studios since 2008, and Dreamscape Entertainment since 2009. Later has a partnership with ZOE Broadcasting Network (A2Z) (2020–present; blocktime agreement), and Advanced Media Broadcasting System (All TV) (2024–present; content partnership that evolved to brand licensing on December 17, 2025, and later added the ABS-CBN branding by having its 2013 logo together with the All TV logo on March 16, 2026) following the shutdown of its free-to-air TV network, allowing ABS-CBN-produced media featuring Martin to air on both networks.); GMA Network (2004–2008); ABC/TV5 (2006–2007; 2021–present) (Note: Collaboration of ABS-CBN with TV5 since January 24, 2021 allowing ABS-CBN-produced media featuring him to air on the latter.)
- Notable work: Walang Hanggan (as Daniel); Juan dela Cruz; FPJ’s Ang Probinsyano (as Cardo/Ador); FPJ’s Batang Quiapo (as Tanggol/Ramon)
- Partner: Julia Montes
- Family: Ronwaldo Martin (brother); Ryan Martin (brother)

Rodel Pacheco Nacianceno (born November 1, 1981), known professionally as Coco Martin, is a Filipino actor, director, producer, screenwriter and filmmaker. Known for his performances in action and romantic drama, he is one of the most awarded Filipino actors of the 21st century. His accolades include an ASEAN International Film Festival and Award, two FAMAS Awards, two Gawad Urian Awards, ten PMPC Star Awards for Television and eight Box Office Entertainment Awards. Martin's films have grossed ₱2.3 billion worldwide, making him one of the highest-grossing box office stars of all time. Tatler Asia named him one of the most influential Filipino personalities in Asia.

Martin began acting in the early 2000s and initially played minor and guest roles in several films. He made his breakthrough with leading roles in widely acclaimed indie films Daybreak (2008), Serbis (2008), Kinatay (2009) and Jay (2008). For his portrayal of Edward Navarro for the latter, he won three Best Supporting Actor awards at the Gawad Urian, Golden Screen and Gawad Genio Awards, respectively. Breaking into the mainstream, he gained further recognition for his roles in television shows such as Tayong Dalawa (2009), Kung Tayo'y Magkakalayo (2010), Minsan Lang Kita Iibigin (2011), Walang Hanggan (2012), Juan dela Cruz (2013), and Ikaw Lamang (2014), before reaching superstardom status by starring in FPJ's Ang Probinsyano (2015) – the second longest-running drama series on Philippine television (Note: FPJ's Ang Probinsyano ran for nearly 7 years from 2015 to 2022, only behind the original television adaptation of Gulong ng Palad (1977), which ran until 1985, a total of 8 years.) – FPJ's Batang Quiapo (2023) and Sigabo (2026).

Often described as the "Ultimate Superstar", he was named Actor of the Decade (2000–2009) at the 34th Gawad Urian Awards. He was also recognized as one of the most influential celebrities of the decade (2010–2019) at the 10th EdukCircle Awards. Among his most successful films at the box-office include The Super Parental Guardians (2016), Beauty and the Bestie (2015), Jack Em Popoy: The Puliscredibles (2018), Ang Panday (2017), Feng Shui 2 (2014), You're My Boss (2015) and Maybe This Time (2014). In 2017, Martin established his own production company CCM Film Productions. His other notable films include Noy (2010) which was selected as the Philippine entry at the 83rd Academy Awards, Sa 'Yo Lamang (2010), Sta. Niña (2012) and Padre de Familia (2016) with Nora Aunor.

== Early life ==
Rodel Pacheco Nacianceno, later known professionally as Coco Martin, was born on November 1, 1981. in Santa Cruz, Manila, to Maria Teresa (née Pacheco) and Ramon Nacianceno. Martin was young when his parents separated causing his grandmother, Matilde, to care for him. He was raised in Novaliches, Quezon City, and later said he spent most of his time on the streets to make ends meet. During these years, he often went to the Quiapo Church in Manila with his grandmother to seek guidance from the Black Nazarene.

Despite poor living conditions, Martin attended elementary and high school at Capitol Institute in Novaliches. Martin earned a degree in hotel and restaurant management from the National College of Business and Arts in Fairview, Quezon City. To sustain his studies, Martin worked as a waiter at Max's Restaurant Fairview branch in 2001, and he also worked as a flier distributor, barista, merchandiser, and driver.

After finishing college, Martin flew to Alberta, Canada, where he worked as a janitor at a bingo parlor. A widowed Filipino-Canadian woman promised to help him secure legal employment if he worked as her housekeeper, but the arrangement was unsuccessful. Martin eventually went back to janitorial work, and after nine months, returned to the Philippines.

== Career ==
=== 2001–2004: Early work and career beginnings ===
Martin started his career in one of the ABS-CBN's talent agencies, Star Magic, as part of the Star Circle Batch 9 in 2001 alongside Angel Locsin, Rafael Rosell, Janus Del Prado, Heart Evangelista, Princess Schuck, and Alwyn Uytingco. He made his acting debut under his real name, Rodel Nacianceno, with a cameo appearance in the 2001 film Luv Text starring Judy Ann Santos. Later that year, he got a minor role in the 2001 film Lakas at Pag-ibig under the name Rodel Salvador. After minor roles in films, Martin began appearing in TV advertisements and print ads. He got his big break in 2004, when the TV personality German Moreno included him as a star on his reality show Walang Tulugan with the Master Showman. He was later scouted for a role in an independent film.

=== 2005–2008: Indie films and career breakthrough ===
At the behest of the manager Ed Instrella, Nacianceno adopted the stage name Coco Martin, combining the names of singers Coco Lee and Ricky Martin. Martin's breakthrough came with the lead role in the 2005 indie film, Masahista (The Masseur), directed by Brillante Mendoza in his directorial debut under Gee Films Productions International and Centerstage Productions. The film, which explored the life of a young man providing massages to gay men, received critical acclaim. It won Best Movie and earned Martin his first Best Actor Award at the 2006 Young Critics Circle. Additionally, 'Masahista' was honored with the prestigious Golden Leopard Award at the 58th Locarno International Film Festival in Switzerland.

In 2006, Martin starred in another Brillante Mendoza-directed indie film, Summer Heat (released locally as Kaleldo). The film garnered multiple nominations at the FAMAS Awards and Gawad Urian Awards, winning the critic's prize for the Network for the Promotion of Asian Cinema (NETPAC) at the 2007 Jeonju International Film Festival in South Korea.

Throughout 2007, Martin continued his involvement in indie films, starring in Siquijor: Mystic Island, a film directed by Mark Philip Espina. He also had a cameo role in Seiko Films' indie production, Foster Child. Notably, Martin top-billed 'Tirador,' another indie film directed by Brillante Mendoza, which delved into the political undertones of Filipino life in poverty.

In the same year, Martin appeared in various indie films such as Pi7ong Tagpo and Nars under Carl & Carl Productions and CCM Creatives. He also acted in his first Cinema One Originals entry, Tambolista, directed by Adolfo Alix, Jr. The film received critical acclaim and premiered at the Rotterdam Film Festival in 2008, with additional screenings at international festivals in Germany and Spain.

In 2007, Martin took on a supporting role in the mainstream film Batanes: Sa Dulo ng Walang Hanggan under GMA Films alongside Iza Calzado and Taiwanese actor Ken Chu of F4, marking his first appearance in a mainstream film. He also ventured into TV series with Daisy Siete: Isla Chikita under GMA Network, his inaugural television project.

Returning to indie films in 2008, Martin starred in Condo under Breaking The Box Productions, portraying an idealistic security guard named Benjamin Castro Jr. The film offered viewers a unique perspective on the life of a security guard and his interactions on the job.

In 2008, Martin starred again in another critically acclaimed indie film Daybreak, a Philippine gay film written by Charliebebs Gohetia and directed by Adolfo Alix Jr. Martin portrayed the role of a boatman who becomes sexually and romantically involved with another man played by Paolo Rivero. In the same year, Martin once again top-billed alongside Jaclyn Jose and Gina Pareno in an award-winning film, Serbis directed by Mendoza. The film competed for the Palme d'Or in the main competition at the 2008 Cannes Film Festival and became the first Filipino film to compete in Cannes since Lino Brocka's Bayan Ko: Kapit sa Patalim in 1984. The film won numerous awards at the 2008 Gawad Urian Awards and at the 3rd Asian Film Awards. Martin returned to the Cinemalaya film festival in 2008 with the film Jay alongside Baron Geisler. The film was directed by Francis Pasion and tackles how media is able to create its own version of the truth. It challenges the audience to be critical and discerning of whatever they see on television or film. This film gave Martin his three Best Supporting Actor Awards at the 2009 Gawad Urian Awards, 2009 ENPRESS Golden Screen Awards, and 2009 Gawad Genio Awards. His contributions to the Philippines independent filmmakers led the media to dub him the "Prince of Philippine Independent Films."

=== 2009–2014: Television projects and rise to fame ===
Martin having typecast for "bold" or erotic roles in indie films like Masahista was an initial obstacle for him to land a role in ABS-CBN's television series. ABS-CBN offered him roles such as a character in a love triangle with Shaina Magdayao and Rayver Cruz roles as well as a gay friend to Judy Ann Santos's character. In both instances the offer for the roles were withdrawn after the production staff learned Martin's history as a "sexy star".

With Jaclyn Jose's encouragement and an endorsement with director Andoy Ranay, Martin managed to land the role in ABS-CBN's Ligaw na Bulaklak. Martin played the role of the main antagonist in the series which premiered in late 2008. Despite Ranay's sudden withdrawal from the production staff, Martin received praised from one of the series' directors who he credits for his television break.

In 2009, he starred in the drama series Tayong Dalawa with Kim Chiu, Gerald Anderson, and Jake Cuenca where he won Best Drama Actor at the 2009 Star Awards for Television. After Tayong Dalawa, he starred in a remake of a 1990 film titled Nagsimula sa Puso, alongside Maja Salvador, Jason Abalos and Nikki Gil. Because of these projects, Martin was offered contract with Star Magic, ABS-CBN's biggest talent agency.

In 2010, he became part of the cast of ABS-CBN's primetime drama Kung Tayo'y Magkakalayo, and had his first leading role in the action series Tonyong Bayawak. The action series is the third installment of ABS-CBN weekly mini-series Agimat: Ang Mga Alamat ni Ramon Revilla (Amulet: The Legendary Chronicles of Ramon Revilla). He also starred in his first mainstream film under Star Cinema, Sa 'yo Lamang, and in the primetime series 1DOL with Sarah Geronimo and Sam Milby.

Despite his success in television, Martin starred in another award-winning, critically acclaimed indie film, Kinatay directed by Brillante Mendoza in 2009. The film premiered at the 62nd Cannes Film Festival, where it won the Best Director Award, the first Filipino film to do so. The film gave Martin his Best Actor Award at the 7th Golden Screen Award and Presidential Jury Award for Excellence in Acting at the 2009 Gawad Tanglaw Awards. He was also nominated for Best Actor at the 2009 FAMAS Award. The following year, Martin got his first top billing in an indie film,

Noy, produced by Star Cinema and directed by Dondon Santos. The film was selected as the Filipino entry for the Best Foreign Language Film at the 83rd Academy Awards, but did not make the shortlist. It was a story about a journalist commissioned to come up with a documentary following the campaign of the character's namesake, Benigno Aquino III, who later became 15th president of the Philippines. In 2011, he led the acclaimed television series Minsan Lang Kita Iibigin, wherein he received the Dekada Award in the Gawad Urian ceremony. He was nominated for multiple awards for his portrayal as Alexander and Javier del Tierro in the series, and won Best Actor in the 20th KBP Golden Dove Awards and Best Drama Actor at the 25th Star Awards for TV.

In 2012, Martin starred in another ensemble series titled Walang Hanggan, an adaptation of the 1991 film Hihintayin Kita sa Langit. He was paired with Julia Montes, as his first official love interest. Because of the success of the series, Coco Martin was dubbed the "Prince of Philippine TV Series". He also starred in his second mainstream film entitled Born to Love You, opposite singer Angeline Quinto. Later, he was cast in a romantic-comedy film directed by John D. Lazatin, Mae Czarina Cruz-Alviar, Frasco Santos Mortiz and Dado C. Lumibao titled, 24/7 in Love. In the same year, a script for a film called Juan dela Cruz was submitted to the 2012 Metro Manila Film Festival but failed to make the final list of entries. The entry, directed by Richard Somes, was one of the 7 rejected scripts. Because of this, Cinemedia Films Production Incorporated and ABS-CBN Dreamscape Entertainment unit head Deo Endrinal decided to retool the cancelled film as a television series, which was aired in 2013 with Erich Gonzales. The series had positive reviews and Martin became a household name. The series earned him another Best Actor Award at the 27th Star Awards for Television and at the 12th Gawad Tanglaw Awards.

In 2012, Martin starred in a film by Emmanuel Quindo Palo titled Sta. Niña along with Alessandra de Rossi, Anita Linda and Irma Adlawan. The film was an official entry for the New Breed Full Length Feature Category at the 8th Cinemalaya Independent Film Festival. The film also won "The Golden Crow Pheasant Award for Best Feature Film" aka Suvarna Chakoram at the 17th International Film Festival of Kerala in India.

Having worked with Director Palo in Sta. Nina, Martin was chosen to star in a 2013 film A Moment in Time together with Julia Montes as his leading lady. The film was shot in Amsterdam and Paris, and was produced by Dreamscape Cinema and Star Cinema. His performance earned him, a nomination for Best Drama Actor at the 2014 FAMAS Awards.

In 2014, Martin starred in Maybe This Time, a film with singer-actress Sarah Geronimo produced by Star Cinema and VIVA Films. In the same year, Martin starred with Kris Aquino in his first ever Metro Manila Film Festival film. The film was a sequel to a 2004 film of the same title also starring Aquino. The film became the second-highest-grossing film at the 2014 Metro Manila Film Festival behind The Amazing Praybeyt Benjamin and holds the title of having the highest opening gross of any Filipino horror film. It earned a total of ₱235.0 million at the box office. In the same year, Martin also starred in the period drama television series entitled Ikaw Lamang with Julia Montes, Kim Chiu and Jake Cuenca. The series earned Martin "Best Performance by an Actor in a TV Series" at the 13th Gawad Tanglaw Awards and "Best Drama Actor" at the 28th PMPC Star Awards for Television.

=== 2015–2022: Ang Probinsyano and critical success ===
In 2015, he starred in an episode of the fantasy anthology television series Wansapanataym entitled "Yamishita's Treasures" alongside his leading lady Julia Montes. He also appeared in an episode of Maalaala Mo Kaya co-starring Angel Locsin and Ejay Falcon that was dedicated to the memory of Special Action Force members killed in the Mamasapano clash.

In September 2015 with an ensemble cast, Martin starred in his most successful television series to date, the TV adaptation of Fernando Poe Jr.'s film FPJ's Ang Probinsyano. To portray the role, he had to train in martial arts such as Kickboxing, Arnis, and MMA. The program was originally set as a year-long series, but due to its continuous success and consistent top rating, it was extended indefinitely and finally ended on August 12, 2022. The longest-running television series lasted from September 28, 2015, to August 12, 2022, with a total of 1,696 episodes. Martin was given a certificate of appreciation for his portrayal of a highly dedicated CIDG Police officer. The citation was given during the 63rd Criminal Investigation and Detection Group (CIDG) Founding Anniversary. On 14 September 2016, Surigao congressman Robert Ace Barbers filed House Resolution No. 358 at the 17th Congress of the Philippines which commended the show for its efforts to promote crime awareness and prevention among viewers and endorsed Martin as "Celebrity Advocate for a Drug-Free Philippines." However, in 2018, the Philippine National Police (PNP) withdrew its support for "Ang Probinsyano" following its negative portrayal of the PNP in the television series. PNP spokesman Chief Superintendent Bong Durana said that an internal memorandum, signed by Director General Eduardo Garado, chief of the PNP Community Relations, was issued ordering all units, offices and personnel to refrain from assisting the producers of the series. In response to this, ABS-CBN has drafted a Memorandum of Understanding and has submitted it to the PNP for its comment, leading to a meeting with Martin, ABS-CBN Management, Department of Interior and Local Government (DILG) Secretary Eduardo Año along with PNP Chief Oscar Albayalde to resolve the issues. Due to the success of Ang Probinsyano, Martin was dubbed as the "King of Philippine Television" by various press and given numerous awards including the "Fernando Poe, Jr. Memorial award" at the 63rd FAMAS. In the same year, Martin starred in the film You're My Boss with Toni Gonzaga and in his second MMFF entry, Beauty and the Bestie with Vice Ganda, the third highest-grossing Filipino film of all time.

In 2016, he starred with superstar Nora Aunor in an indie film titled Padre de Familia directed by Adolf Alix Jr. The film was based on Martin's experiences working overseas. It premiered at selected cinemas in Europe and the Middle East via The Filipino Channel. In the same year, he starred in his third Metro Manila Film Festival entry, The Super Parental Guardians, along with Vice Ganda and Awra Briguela under Star Cinema. It was the second-highest grossing Filipino film of all time.

In 2017, Martin launched his own production company, CCM Productions, and had his first directorial and producer debut in the film Ang Panday, a 2017 Metro Manila Film Festival entry. The role was first popularized by late actor Fernando Poe Jr., hence, making it the second time Martin portrayed one of his roles. In 2018, he produced another film Jack Em Popoy: The Puliscredibles, a 2018 Metro Manila Film Festival entry and starred alongside GMA Network artists Maine Mendoza and Vic Sotto. In 2019, he produced, wrote, directed and starred in the 2019 Metro Manila Film Festival entry 3pol Trobol: Huli Ka Balbon! with Jennylyn Mercado and Ai-Ai delas Alas.

In 2021, Martin starred in a romantic comedy film Love or Money with Angelica Panganiban under CCM Productions and Star Cinema. The movie was filmed on various locations in Dubai, United Arab Emirates.

=== 2022–present: Batang Quiapo and other projects ===
In July 2022, Metropolitan Manila Development Authority announced the 4 initial entries for 2022 Metro Manila Film Festival, and Martin's film Labyu with an Accent together with Jodi Sta. Maria was included. Martin is set to appear again in the Brillante Mendoza film Apag alongside Lito Lapid, Gladys Reyes, Gina Pareño, Joseph Marco, Shaina Magdayao and Mercedes Cabral, an official entry for the 2023 Metro Manila Summer Film Festival. The role was initially pitched to Aljur Abrenica. He will also lead an indie horror film directed by Mendoza titled, Pola, together with Julia Montes. The film was shot in Pola, Oriental Mindoro, hence the title and is set to be released early 2023.

In February 2023, Martin together with actress Lovi Poe and an ensemble cast returns in the TV adaptation of the 1986 film Batang Quiapo. It was created by Pablo S. Gomez and starred Fernando Poe, Jr. Martin will also serve as the series' co-director, co-writer, and co-producer under his film production company.

During a TV Patrol interview on February 21, 2026, Martin announced that Batang Quiapo will conclude on March 13, 2026, and he and his longtime partner, Julia Montes, will star in a role for an upcoming action-comedy drama series, Sigabo, which is set to air on June 22, 2026.

== Personal life ==
Martin in May 2023 announced that he has been in a romantic relationship with Julia Montes. It was not explicitly disclosed on when the two started their romantic relationship. Martin at the time remarked that he has been "together" with Montes for 12 years. They first worked together in the 2008 televisions series Ligaw na Bulaklak. It was in 2011, that two were linked together which at the time Martin vehemently denied "wooing" Montes at Showbiz News Ngayon but admitted prior professional relations.

He is the older brother of actor Ronwaldo Martin.

In March 2025, Martin's ex-girlfriend, former actress Katherine Luna, apologized to him for the trouble caused after he was mistakenly labeled the biological father of one of her children. He also offered to help her with her eye surgery.

== Filmography ==
=== As actor ===
==== Television ====
Year	Title	Role	Notes	Source
2002	Click	Guest role		
2004–2008	Walang Tulugan with the Master Showman	Himself/host		
2006–2007	Teka Mona!	Himself		
2007	Mga Kwento ni Lola Basyang	Bulag 6	Episode: "Ang Walong Bulag"	
2007	Daisy Siete	David	Season 15: Isla Chikita	
2008	Maalaala Mo Kaya	James	Episode: "Bibliya"	
2008	Ligaw na Bulaklak	Ronel / Chris Alegro		
2008	Komiks: Tiny Tony	Joaquin Peralta		
2008	Maalaala Mo Kaya	Billy	Episode: "Boarding House"	
2009–present	ASAP	Himself		
2009	Tayong Dalawa	Ramon Dionisio Lecumberri		
2009	Komiks: Nasaan Ka Maruja	James		
2009–2010	Nagsimula sa Puso	Carlo Pangdanganan		
2010	Kung Tayo'y Magkakalayo	Ringo Quijano Crisanto		
2010	Agimat: Ang Mga Alamat ni Ramon Revilla Presents: Tonyong Bayawak	Antonio "Tonyo" dela Cruz / Tonyong Bayawak		
2010	1DOL	Fernando "Lando" Lagdameo†		
2010	Maalaala Mo Kaya	Jerome Ortega	Episode: "Silbato"	
2011	Minsan Lang Kita Iibigin	2nd Lt. Alexander "Xander" Sebastiano Del Tierro		
2011	Minsan Lang Kita Iibigin	Javier Del Tierro		
2011	100 Days to Heaven	Young Tagabantay		
2011–2012	Growing Up	Asiong		
2012	Walang Hanggan	Daniel Cruz / Daniel C. Guidotti / Daniel Guidotti Montenegro†		
2012	Maalaala Mo Kaya	Ramon	Episode: "Kamao"	
2013	Kahit Konting Pagtingin	Bus passenger	Cameo	
2013	Juan Dela Cruz	Juan Dela Cruz	Lead role	
2013	Juan Dela Cruz	Anak ng Dilim (Son of Darkness)†		
2013	My Little Juan	Adult Juan dela Cruz		
2013	Wansapanataym	Police Officer Carlos "Caloy/Caloykoy" de Guzman	Episode: "Simbang Gabi"	
2014	Ikaw Lamang	Samuel Severino Hidalgo	Main role	
2014	Ikaw Lamang – Book 2	Gabriel R. Hidalgo / Gabriel L. Mondigo	Main role	
2015	Wansapanataym	Yamishita "Yami"	Episode: "Yamishita's Treasures"	
2015	Maalaala Mo Kaya	PS/Insp. Garry Erana†	Episode: "Plano"	
2015	Maalaala Mo Kaya	PS/Insp. Garry Erana†	Episode: "Watawat"	
2015–2022	FPJ's Ang Probinsyano	P/Maj. Ricardo "Cardo" Dalisay	Main role	
2015–2022	FPJ's Ang Probinsyano	PS/Insp. Dominador "Ador" B. De Leon†	Main role	
2023–2026	FPJ's Batang Quiapo	Young Ramon Montenegro	Main role	
2023–2026	FPJ's Batang Quiapo	Hesus Nazareno "Tanggol" Guerrero-Dimaguiba / Mayor Hesus Nazareno "Tanggol" Guerrero-Montenegro	Main role	
2026–present	Sigabo	Gabriel "Gabo" Pascual-Magtibay	Main role	

==== Film ====
Year	Title	Role	Notes	Source
2001	Luv Text	Ivan's friend	as Rodel Nacianceno	
2001	Lakas at Pag-ibig	Lito	as Rodel Salvador	
2002	Ang Agimat: Anting-Anting ni Lolo	Armon		
2005	Masahista	Iliac		
2006	Summer Heat	Iliac		
2007	Siquijor: Mystic Island	Miguel Sarmiento		
2007	Foster Child	Pedicab driver	Uncredited	
2007	Ataul: For Rent	Danny		
2007	Tirador	Caloy		
2007	Pi7ong Tagpo	Sonny	Segment: "Star City"	
2007	Nars	Noel		
2007	Tambolista	Billy		
2007	Batanes	Jason		
2008	Condo	Benjie Castro	Main role	
2008	Daybreak	JP		
2008	Service	Alan		
2008	Jay	Edward Navarro		
2008	Tiltil	Manuel		
2008	Next Attraction			
2009	Kinatay	Pepeng		
2009	Soliloquy (Biyaheng Lupa)	Obet Labrador		
2010	Noy	Noy	Also story writer^{A}	
2010	Sa 'yo Lamang	Coby		
2012	Captive	Abusama		
2012	Born to Love You	Rex Manrique	Also writer and producer^{A}	
2012	Sta. Niña	Pol	Also producer^{A}	
2012	24/7 in Love	Dante	Special participation	
2013	A Moment in Time	Patrick Javier	Main role Also co-writer^{A}	
2014	Maybe This Time	Antonio "Tonio" Bugayong	Main role	
2014	Feng Shui 2	Lester Anonuevo	Main role Official 41st Metro Manila Film Festival entry	
2015	You're My Boss	Pong Dalupan		
2015	Beauty and the Bestie	Emman Castillo	Main role Official 42nd Metro Manila Film Festival entry	
2016	Padre de Familia	Noel Santiago	Also producer^{A}	
2016	The Super Parental Guardians	Neil "Paco" Nabati	Also co-story writer^{A}	
2017	Carlo J. Caparas' Ang Panday	Flavio Batungbakal III/Panday	Also director, co-screenplay writer, story writer, and producer^{A} Lead role in a protagonist Official 43rd Metro Manila Film Festival entry	
2018	Jack Em Popoy: The Puliscredibles	PS/Insp. Jacinto "Jack" Halimuyac	Also writer and producer^{A} Official 44th Metro Manila Film Festival entry	
2019	3pol Trobol: Huli Ka Balbon!	Apollo "Pol" C. Balbon	Also director and story writer^{A} Official 45th Metro Manila Film Festival entry	
2021	Love or Money	Leon Antonio	Main role	
2022	Labyu with an Accent	Gabriel "Gabo" Madlangbayan	Also co-screenplay and story writer^{A} Main role Official 48th Metro Manila Film Festival entry	
2022	Apag	Rafael Tuazon	Present in Summer Metro Manila Film Festival	
2024	Pula	Daniel Faraon		
2024	And the Breadwinner Is...	R.N. Elias	Guest appearance Official 50th Metro Manila Film Festival entry	
2026	On the Job: Maghari	Mario Maghari/Tatang		
2027	May Pagasa: The Battles of Andres Bonifacio	Andrés Bonifacio	Main role in a protagonist	
TBA	Untitled Brillante Mendoza film			

=== As director ===
==== Television ====
Year	Title	Notes
2015–2022	FPJ's Ang Probinsyano	Credited as Rodel Nacianceno
2023–2026	FPJ's Batang Quiapo	Credited as Coco Martin
2024	Pamilya Sagrado	Credited as Coco Martin (Special guest director, action scenes only)
2026	Sigabo	Credited as Coco Martin

==== Film ====
Year	Title	Notes
2010	Noy	Directed with Dondon Santos; credited as Rodel Nacianceno
2017	Carlo J. Caparas' Ang Panday	Credited as Rodel Nacianceno
2019	3pol Trobol: Huli Ka Balbon!	Credited as Rodel Nacianceno
2022	Labyu with an Accent	Credited as Rodel Nacianceno

=== As writer ===
==== Film ====
Year	Title	Notes
2010	Noy	Story writer; credited as Rodel Nacianceno
2012	Born to Love You	Story writer; credited as Rodel Nacianceno
2013	A Moment in Time	Story writer; credited as Rodel Nacianceno
2016	The Super Parental Guardians	Story writer; credited as Rodel Nacianceno
2017	Carlo J. Caparas' Ang Panday	Credited as Rodel Nacianceno
2018	Jack Em Popoy: The Puliscredibles	Credited as Rodel Nacianceno
2019	3pol Trobol: Huli Ka Balbon!	Credited as Rodel Nacianceno
2022	Labyu with an Accent	Credited as Rodel Nacianceno

== Other ventures ==
=== Production company ===
In 2017, Martin established his own film production company 'CCM Film Productions'. As of today, the company has produced three films since 2017: Ang Panday, Jack Em Popoy: The Puliscredibles, and 3pol Trobol: Huli Ka Balbon!, all of which are starred by Martin.

==== Feature films ====
Year	Title
2017	Carlo J. Caparas' Ang Panday
2018	Jack Em Popoy: The Puliscredibles
2019	3pol Trobol: Huli Ka Balbon!

==== Television ====
Year	Title
2023–2026	Batang Quiapo
2026	Sigabo

== Awards and nominations ==
Year	Film Award/Critics	Award/Category	Result
2006	Young Critics Circle	Best Performance by Male or Female, Adult or Child, Individual or Ensemble in Leading or Supporting Role for Masahista	Won
2008	Golden Screen Award	Best Performance by an Actor in a Lead Role (Drama) for Tambolista	Nominated
2008	Gawad Urian Award	Best Supporting Actor for Tambolista	Nominated
2009	Gawad PASADO	Pinakapasadong Katuwang na Aktor for Jay and Serbis	Nominated
2009	ENPRESS Golden Screen Awards	Best Performance by an Actor in a Supporting Role (Drama, Musical or Comedy) for Jay	Won
2009	Gawad Genio Awards	Best Film Supporting Actor for Jay	Won
2009	Gawad Urian Award	Best Actor for Daybreak	Nominated
2009	Gawad Urian Award	Best Supporting Actor for Jay	Won
2009	ASAP Pop Viewer's Choice Awards	Pop TV Character of the Year (Ramon) for Tayong Dalawa	Won
2009	PMPC Star Awards for TV	Best Drama Actor for Tayong Dalawa	Won
2010	Gawad Tanglaw Awards	Best Ensemble Performance in a Television Drama for Tayong Dalawa	Nominated
2010	Gawad Tanglaw Awards	Presidential Jury Award for Excellence in Acting for Tayong Dalawa	Won
2010	Gawad Genio Awards	Best Film Actor Kinatay	Nominated
2010	Young Critics Circle	Best Performance by Male or Female, Adult or Child, Individual or Ensemble in Leading or Supporting Role for Soliloquy	Nominated
2010	Golden Screen Award	Best Performance by an Actor in a Leading Role (Drama) for Kinatay	Won
2010	41st Guillermo Mendoza Awards	Promising Male Box Office Star for Movies & TV	Won
2010	Gawad Urian Awards	Best Actor for Kinatay	Nominated
2010	ASAP Pop Viewer's Choice Awards	Pop Pin Up Boy	Nominated
2010	Anak TV Seal Awards	Most Admired Male TV Personality	Nominated
2010	FAMAS Award	Best Actor for Kinatay	Nominated
2010	Star Awards for TV	Best Drama Actor for Kung Tayo'y Magkakalayo	Nominated
2010	19th KBP Golden Dove Awards	Best Drama Actor for Kung Tayo'y Magkakalayo	Won
2011	42nd Guillermo Mendoza Awards	Prince of Philippine Movies & TV for Sa'yo Lamang	Won
2011	Gawad Tanglaw Awards	Best Actor for Noy	Nominated
2011	Gawad Urian Awards	Actor of the Decade (Dekada Award)	Won
2011	Gawad Urian Awards	Best Actor for Noy	Nominated
2011	Golden Screen Awards	Best Performance by an Actor in a Supporting Role (Drama, Musical or Comedy) for Sa'yo Lamang	Nominated
2011	Golden Screen Awards	Best Performance by an Actor in a Leading Role (Drama) for Noy	Nominated
2011	FAP Awards	Best Actor for Noy	Nominated
2011	Star Awards for Movies	Movie Supporting Actor of the Year for Sa'yo Lamang	Nominated
2011	Star Awards for Movies	Movie Actor of the Year for Noy	Won
2011	Yahoo! OMG Awards	Breakthrough Actor of the Year	Won
2011	ASAP Pop Viewer's Choice Awards	Pop Kapamilya TV Character (Alexander and Javier) for Minsan Lang Kita Iibigin	Won
2011	20th KBP Golden Dove Awards	Best Actor for Minsan Lang Kita Iibigin	Won
2011	Golden Screen TV Awards	Outstanding Performance by an Actor in a Single Drama/Telemovie Program for Maalaala Mo Kaya: Silbato	Won
2011	Golden Screen TV Awards	Outstanding Performance by an Actor in a Drama Series for Minsan Lang Kita Iibigin	Won
2011	Star Awards for TV	Best Single Performance by an Actor for Maalaala Mo Kaya: Silbato	Won
2011	Star Awards for TV	Best Drama Actor for Minsan Lang Kita Iibigin	Won
2011	Star Awards for TV	Male Star of the Night	Won
2011	Anak TV Seal Awards	Most Admired Male TV Personality	Won
2011	FAMAS Award	Best Actor for Noy	Nominated
2011	FAMAS Award	Best Director for Noy	Nominated
2011	Gawad Genio Awards	Best Film Actor for Noy	Won
2012	8th USTv Student's Choice Awards	Best Actor in a Daily Local Soap Opera for Minsan Lang Kita Iibigin	Won
2012	Gawad TANGLAW Awards	Best Performance by an Actor in a Drama Series for Minsan Lang Kita Iibigin	Won
2012	Gawad TANGLAW Awards	Pinakakapuri-puring Artista ng Dekada	Won
2012	2nd EdukCircle Awards	Best Television Drama Actor	Won
2012	Northwest Samar State University Students' Choice Awards for Radio and Television	Best Actor in a Primetime Teleserye for Minsan Lang Kita Iibigin	Won
2012	Yahoo! OMG Awards	Actor of the Year	Won
2012	ASAP Pop Viewer's Choice Awards	Pop Kapamilya TV Character (Daniel Guidotti) for Walang Hanggan	Nominated
2012	PMPC Star Awards for Television	Best Drama Actor for Walang Hanggan	Nominated
2012	15th Asian Television Awards	Best Actor in a Lead-Drama Role for MMK: Kamao	Nominated
2012	43rd Guillermo Mendoza Awards	Prince of Philippine Television – Minsan Lang Kita Iibigin	Won
2013	Familia Sauza-Berenguer de Marquina 93rd Las Familias Unidas FitzGerald Awards	Youth Role Model of the Year	Won
2013	61st FAMAS Awards	Best Actor for Sta. Niña	Nominated
2013	31st FAP Awards	Best Actor for Sta. Niña	Nominated
2013	10th ENPRESS Golden Screen TV Awards	Outstanding Performance by an Actor for Walang Hanggan	Nominated
2013	10th ENPRESS Golden Screen TV Awards	Outstanding Performance by an Actor in a Single Drama/Telemovie Program for MMK: Kamao	Nominated
2013	29th PMPC Star Awards for Movies	Movie Actor of the Year for Sta. Nina	Nominated
2013	1st ASEAN International Film Festival and Awards	Best Actor for Sta. Nina	Nominated
2013	10th Gawad Urian Awards	Best Actor for Sta. Nina	Nominated
2013	44th Box Office Entertainment Awards (GMMSFI)	Prince and Princess of Philippine Television (shared with Julia Montes)	Won
2013	44th Box Office Entertainment Awards (GMMSFI)	Most Popular Primetime TV Drama Series for Walang Hanggan (shared with cast)	Won
2013	Yahoo! OMG Awards	Actor of the Year	Won
2013	3rd EdukCircle Awards	Most Influential Celebrity Endorser of Year	Won
2013	27th PMPC Star Awards For TV	Best Drama Actor of the Year	Won
2013	27th PMPC Star Awards For TV	Male Star Of The Night	Won
2013	27th PMPC Star Awards For TV	Best Primetime Drama Series for "Juan Dela Cruz" (shared with the cast)	Won
2013	Anak TV Seal Awards	Youth Role Model of the Year	Won
2014	12th Gawad Tanglaw Awards	Best Performance by an Actor in a TV Series for "Juan Dela Cruz"	Won
2014	Yahoo! OMG Awards	Actor of the Year	Won
2014	62nd FAMAS Awards	Best Actor for A Moment in Time	Nominated
2014	4th EdukCircle Awards	Best Television Drama Actor	Won
2014	28th PMPC Star Awards For TV	Best Drama Actor	Won
2014	28th PMPC Star Awards For TV	Best Primetime Drama Series for "Ikaw Lamang" (shared with the cast)	Won
2014	40th Metro Manila Film Festival	Best Festival Actor for Feng Shui 2	Nominated
2015	13th Gawad Tanglaw Awards	Best Performance by an Actor (TV Series) for Ikaw Lamang	Won
2015	5th EdukCircle Awards	Best Television Drama Actor	Won
2015	2nd Paragala: Central Luzon Media Awards	Best Television Actor for Ikaw Lamang	Won
2015	1st Platinum Media Media Stallion Awards	Best Film Actor	Won
2015	6th ENPRESS Golden Screen TV Awards	Best Actor in a Drama Program for Ikaw Lamang	Nominated
2015	Alta Media Icon Awards 2015	Best Actor for film Feng Shui 2	Won
2015	Alta Media Icon Awards 2015	Best Actor for TV Ikaw Lamang	Won
2015	63rd FAMAS Awards	Fernando Poe, Jr. Memorial award	Won
2016	6th EdukCircle Awards	Best Television Drama Actor – HALL OF FAME Award	Won
2016	6th EdukCircle Awards	Most Influential Film Actors of the Year for Beauty and the Bestie	Won
2016	6th EdukCircle Awards	Box Office Tandem of the Year (with Vice Ganda) for Beauty and the Bestie	Won
2016	64th FAMAS Awards	Best Actor for You're My Boss	Nominated
2016	63rd CIDG Founding Anniversary	Certificate of Appreciation	Won
2016	14th Gawad Tanglaw Awards	Best Performance by an Actor in a (TV Series) for FPJ's Ang Probinsyano	Won
2016	18th Anak TV Awards	Top Male Anak TV Makabata Star for 2015	Won
2016	3rd UmalohokJUAN Communication & Media Awards	Best TV Actor for FPJ's Ang Probinsyano	Won
2016	7th NSCART Awards	Best Actor	Won
2016	4th Kagitingan Awards for TV of Bataan Peninsula State University	PINAKAMAGITING NA PERSONALIDAD SA DULANG SERYE for FPJ's Ang Probinsyano	Won
2016	47th Box Office Entertainment Awards (GMMSFI)	Phenomenal Star of 2015 for Beauty and the Bestie	Won
2016	24th KBP Golden Dove Awards	Best TV Actor in a Drama Program for FPJ's Ang Probinsyano	Won
2016	Golden Laurel Lycean Choice Media Awards	Best TV Actor for FPJ's Ang Probinsyano	Won
2016	Alta Media Icon Awards 2016	Best Drama Actor for TV for FPJ's Ang Probinsyano	Won
2016	LPU-Laguna Kung-gihan Awards 2016	SAFETY AWARENESS TV PERSONALITY	Won
2016	30th PMPC Star Awards for TV	Best Drama Actor for FPJ's Ang Probinsyano	Won
2016	Anak TV Awards	Makabata HALL OF FAME Award	Won
2016	2nd Illumine GIC Innovation Awards For Television	Most Innovative TV Actor for 2016	Won
2016	7th TV Series Craze Awards 2016	Leading Man of the Year	Won
2017	15th Gawad Tanglaw Awards	Best Performance by an Actor (TV Series) for FPJ's Ang Probinsyano	Won
2017	3rd Aral Parangal Awards	Best Drama Actor	Won
2017	Guild of Educators, Mentors, and Students	Natatanging Hiyas ng Sining sa Telebisyon	Won
2017	48th Box Office Entertainment Awards	Phenomenal Star of Philippine Cinema for The Super Parental Guardians	Won
2017	48th Box Office Entertainment Awards	Breakthrough Performance by an Actor in A Single Program for FPJ's Ang Probinsyano	Won
2017	Gawad Bedista Awards	Actor of the Year for TV	Won
2017	Golden Laurel LPU Batangas Media Awards	Best Television Actor	Won
2017	TASCO 1st CSR Impact Awards	Citizen-Character Model of The Year	Won
2017	PARAGALA: Central Luzon Media Awards	Best Television Actor	Won
2017	UmalohokJUAN 2017	Television Actor of the Year	Won
2017	8th Northwest Samar State University Students' Choice Awards for Radio and Television (NSCART)	Best Actor in a Primetime Teleserye	Won
2017	Gawad Pasado 2017	Pinakapasadong Simbolo ng Kagandahang Asal	Won
2017	Gawad Pasado 2017	Pinakapasadong Aktor sa Teleserye	Won
2017	Kagitingan Awards for Television 2017	Pinakamagiting na Dulang Personalidad sa Seryeng Drama	Won
2017	25th KBP Golden Dove Awards	Best Actor in a Drama Program for FPJ's Ang Probinsyano	Won
2017	Alta Media Icon Awards 2017	Best Drama Actor for FPJ's Ang Probinsyano	Won
2017	EdukCircle Awards 2017	Most Influential Film Actor of the Year for The Super Parental Guardians	Won
2017	EdukCircle Awards 2017	Most Influential Male Endorser of the Year	Won
2017	2017 COMGUILD Academe's Choice Award	Male Endorser of the Year	Won
2017	PMPC Star Awards for TV 2017	Best Drama Actor	Nominated
2017	Push Awards 2017	Push Male TV Performance of the Year	Won
2017	3rd Lion HearTV RAWR Awards	Actor of the Year	Won
2017	3rd Lion HearTV RAWR Awards	Royal Lion Awardee	Won
2017	PEP List Awards	Male TV Star of the Year	Won
2017	PEP List Awards	Teleserye Actor of the Year for FPJ's Ang Probinsyano	Won
2017	43rd Metro Manila Film Festival	Best Actor for Ang Panday	Nominated
2017	MMFF 2017 Gabi ng Parangal	Special Jury Prize	Won
2018	1ST NCST Dangal Ng Bayan Media Excellence Awards	Model Actor for Criminology	Won
2018	3rd GIC Innovation Awards for Television	Most Innovative TV Actor	Won
2018	Dangal ng Bayan Awards 2018	Awardee for FPJ's Ang Probinsyano	Won
2018	Batarisan Awards 2018	Best Drama Actor for TV	Won
2018	5th PARAGALA: Central Luzon Media Awards	Best Television Actor for FPJ's Ang Probinsyano	Won
2018	Platinum Stallion Media Awards 2018	Best TV Actor	Won
2018	49th Box Office Entertainment Awards	Most Popular Film Director for Ang Panday	Won
2018	66th FAMAS Awards	Fernando Poe Jr. Memorial Award Recipient	Won
2018	8th EdukCircle Awards	Most Influential Film Actor of the Year for Ang Panday	Won
2018	8th EdukCircle Awards	Most Influential Male Endorser of the Year	Won
2018	4th ALTA Media Icon Awards	Best Actor for TV	Won
2019	50th Box Office Entertainment Awards	Box Office King for Jack Em Popoy: The Puliscredibles	Won
2019	6th PARAGALA: Central Luzon Media Awards	Best Television Actor for FPJ's Ang Probinsyano	Won
2019	6th PARAGALA: Central Luzon Media Awards	Hall of Fame Awardee	Won
2019	Young Educators' Convergence of SoCCKSarGen, Inc.	Best TV Actor	Won
2019	35th PMPC Star Awards for Movies	Movie Loveteam of the Year (shared with Maine Mendoza) for Jack Em Popoy: The Puliscredibles	Nominated
2019	Sine Sandaan	One of Philippine Cinema Icons	Won
2019	5th Aral Parangal Awards	Best TV Actor	Won
2019	9th EdukCircle Awards	Most Influential Film Actor of the Year	Won
2019	9th EdukCircle Awards	Most Influential Male Celebrity Endorser of the Year	Won
2019	The Platinum Stallion Media Awards 2019	Best TV Male Personality	Won
2020	3rd Gawad Lasallianeta Awards	Most Outstanding Male TV Lead Dramatic Actor	Won
2020	51st Box Office Entertainment Awards	TV Actor of the Year	Won
2020	Northwest Samar State University Student's Choice Awards	Best Actor in a Primetime Teleserye	Won
2020	10th EdukCircle Awards	Most Influential Celebrity of the Decade	Won
2021	34th Star Awards for Television	Best Drama Actor for FPJ's Ang Probinsyano	Nominated
2021	69th FAMAS Awards	Best Actor for Love or Money	Nominated
2022	VP Choice Awards	TV Actor of the Year for FPJ's Ang Probinsyano	Won
2022	Golden Laurel LPU Batangas Media Awards 2022	Best Drama Actor	Nominated
