= My Little Juan =

- Genre: Comedy drama; Coming-of-age; Urban fantasy
- Created by: ABS-CBN Studios; Rondel P. Lindayag
- Written by: Philip King
- Directed by: Darnel Joy R. Villaflor; Francis E. Pasion
- Creative director: Daniel Lim
- Starring: Izzy Canillo; Jaime Fabregas
- Country of origin: Philippines
- Original languages: Filipino; English
- No. of episodes: 85

Production
- Executive producers: Roldeo T. Endrinal; Rosselle Beegee Soldao
- Production locations: Pakil, Laguna; Quezon City; Quiapo, Manila
- Running time: 30 minutes Monday to Friday at 15:00 (PST)
- Production company: Dreamscape Entertainment

Original release
- Network: ABS-CBN
- Release: May 20 – September 13, 2013

Related
- Juan dela Cruz

My Little Juan is a 2013 Philippine television drama series broadcast by ABS-CBN. The series takes place between the events of Juan dela Cruz. Directed by Darnel Joy R. Villaflor and Francis E. Pasion, it stars Jaime Fabregas and Izzy Canillo. It aired on the network's Kapamilya Gold line up and worldwide on TFC from May 20 to September 13, 2013, replacing May Isang Pangarap and was replaced by Kapamilya Blockbusters. The series deals with the themes of faith-in-oneself, identity, and love, along with issues of bullying and morality. Elements from the mythology of the Aswang has been incorporated all throughout the series, like it can take a human form and it can turn other people into an Aswang, along with the series' own mythology.

== Plot ==
The series follows a young Juan dela Cruz (Izzy Canillo) as he, with the help of Father Cito (Jaime Fabregas), prepares for his future role as the "Tagabantay" (The Guardian), while struggling to balance his goodness with the evil brewing inside him inherited from his father, an "Aswang", a humanoid creature similarly related to the Vampire, whose objective is to take over the society of men and claim it as their own. Being the Tagabantay is a role that has been passed down through generations of people who are the only ones who can wield the "Bakal na Krus" (Iron Cross). It is the duty of the Tagabantay to protect the people against the dreaded Aswang.

== Cast and characters ==
=== Main cast ===
- Izzy Canillo as Juan dela Cruz
- Jaime Fabregas as Fr. Ramoncito "Cito" Gonzales

=== Supporting cast ===
- Tetchie Agbayani as Doña Tomasa Calibaquib / Evelyn Bunag

- Doña Tomasa was a stereotypical corrupt woman. She made many schemes to acquire more riches, even it means swindling the townspeople of San Juan Bautista. She valued material wealth highly. When flashfloods entered her residence, she was quick to order her helpers to saver her antique vases and paintings from the floods. Tomasa has a dark past was bullied during her childhood and this caused her hunger for approval. This caused her to seek for a town award, believing it would satisfy her need for approval. She even bribed the judges just to get the award.

- Smokey Manaloto as Alvin Balmaceda

- Alvin is a steady presence for his wife, Ruth. However, beneath his calm exterior is a man consumed by the "what ifs" of his daughter's death.

- Desiree del Valle as Ruth Balmaceda

- She is the Wife of Alvin, They share a "battle-hardened" love. They are partners in every sense—grieving together and fighting together.

- Wendy Valdez as Margie Dela Fuente

- Margie is the personal assistant to Donya Tomasa. She presents herself as a professional, loyal, and reliable employee, which allows her to move freely within the elite circles and religious settings of the town. Beneath her polished exterior, Margie is actually an Aswang. She serves as a mole, using her position to gather information and facilitate the dark agenda of her kind.

- Beverly Salviejo as Teacher

- Juan's Teacher, She always observes Juan's actions and movements inside the school.

- Arlene Tolibas as Audrey

- She is self-righteous, stern, and often acts as the "enforcer" for Donya Tomasa’s whims. She is one of the townspeople who is most vocal about her dislike for Juan, viewing him as a "son of the devil" and a menace to their peaceful community.

- Evelyn Santos as Beverley

- Often seen as the most talkative of the group. She is quick to spread rumors about Juan’s latest "misdeeds" and is deeply loyal to Donya Tomasa’s social hierarchy.

- Evelyn Sarza as Cassandra

- Another member of the parish group. Like Beverly, she represents the narrow-mindedness of the townspeople who refuse to see the good in Juan.

- Brenda Porcadilla as Daphnie

- Completes the trio/quartet of ladies. She is usually present during the church-related events where the group plots to get Juan in trouble or tries to impress the parish priest.

- Mel Kimura as Teacher Daisy

- Juan's Teacher, Who Assigned Buboy to become his Special Tutor for the Exam.

- Gerhard Acao as Steve

- Audrey's Husband and Lester's Father, he is the Toda/Tricycle Driver, Sometimes he with Juan.

- Nicky Castro as Lester
- Juan's Classmate and Audrey and Steve's Son, like his Mother, Lester hates Juan too.

=== Guest cast ===
- Johan Santos as Aswang
- Nico Antonio as Aswang
- Josh Morales as Aswang
- Yogo Singh as Clarence
- Matet de Leon as Irma
- Joross Gamboa as Jorge
- Gio Alvarez as Alberto
- Jose Sarasola as Aswang
- Nanding Josef as Mang Peping
- Charee Pineda as Atty. Esther Sandoval
- Christopher Roxas as Teroy
- Mike Lloren as Boyet
- Kyle Banzon as Estong
- Gerald Pesigan as Eloy
- Paolo Serrano as Jordan
- Jhiz Deocareza as Buboy
- Yayo Aguila as Bechay
- Niña Dolino as Marissa
- Jhong Hilario as Poldo
- Alex Medina as Jethro Sanchez
- Cara Eriguel as Danica
- Perla Bautista as Sunshine Domingo
- Chinggoy Alonzo as Manolo Domingo
- Pokwang as Sarah de Guzman
- Allan Paule as Mark de Guzman
- Tony Mabesa as Fr. Sarmiento
- Leo Rialp as Manuel "Manny" de Dios
- Boom Labrusca as Bobby
- Zeppi Borromeo as George
- Marvin Yap as Camping Teacher
- Quintin Alianza as Quintin

=== Special participation ===
- Mylene Dizon as Amelia dela Cruz
- Albert Martinez as Samuel Alejandro
- Martin Nievera as himself
- Gina Pareño as Belen Gonzales
- Zsa Zsa Padilla as Laura Reyes-Alejandro
- Erich Gonzales as Rosario Galang
- Coco Martin as adult Juan dela Cruz

== See also ==
- List of programs broadcast by ABS-CBN
- List of ABS-CBN Studios original drama series
- Juan dela Cruz
