= List of Batang Quiapo guest stars =

This is a list of the guest cast of characters in the 2023 Filipino primetime television series FPJ's Batang Quiapo under ABS-CBN Entertainment.

== List of guest casts ==
=== Final ===
- Rey Campanilla as Congressman Leo Mojica
- Jun Nayra as Councilor Emilio Umali
- Tess Antonio as Vice Mayor Evelyn Dumlao
- Nor Domingo as Councilor Tonyo Mercado
- Chet Pastrana as Councilor Francis Baylon
- Happy Marcial as Happy
- Ghercie Soriano as Ghercie
- Geline Garcia as Geline
- Salvador "Badong" Domasian Jr. as Joel
- Simon Ibarra as Commissioner Ignacio Medina
- Nanding Josef as Rev. Fr. Ruben

=== Former ===
- Emil Sandoval as Kokoy
- Rani Caldoza as Mr. Valentin
- Jun Hidalgo as Omar
- Rey Langit as Reporter Ruben
- Robbie Packing as Ato
- JR De Rama as Estong
- Jeolanie Sacdalan as Berto
- Angela Balagtas as Kiara
- Kevin de Vela as Efren
- Shanaia Gomez as Selene
- Christine Bermas as Aileen
- Rafael "Nonoy" Froilan as Kanor
- Edna Vida Froilan as Erlinda
- Via Veloso as Cynthia
- Lowell Conales as Raul
- Giovanni Baldisseri as Felix Jacobe
- Alireza Libre as Atty. Legaspi
- Dino Imperial as JP
- Jimboy Martin as Karlo
- Sophie Reyes as Jill
- Karla Marie Preizer as Sarah
- Drey Brown as Tony
- Leo Bruno as Fria
- Alexa Macanan as Ema
- Katrina Paula as Tinay
- Amanda Zamora as Charlene Cheng
- Ava Mendez as Eva
- John Lapid as John
- Syra Mulleno as Café Manager
- Jasper Visaya as Café Customer
- Kenjhons Serrano as Victor
- Jong Cuenco as Former Congressman Amado Sevilla
- Peso Ratschild as Baldo
- Eddie "Nognog" Vale as Nognog
- Jaime "Pango" Cuales as Pango
- Roberto "Bantay" Antonino as Bantay / Kulas
- Alma Concepcion as Queeny Fortun-Zaballa
- Leandro Baldemor as Jimmy Zaballa
- Boss "Barakojuan" John as Bobet "Buboy" Border
- Bullet "Boss Bullet" Manliclic as Baste "Bagyo" Fuego
- Michael Rivero as Abner
- Joel "Pambansang Kolokoy" Mondina as Cocoy
- Zeppi Borromeo as Fidel
- Darwin "Haprice" Tolentino as Teron
- Rey Solo as Solo
- Raul "Higante" Dillo as Raul
- Rey Bejar as Bejar
- Alex Cunanan as Augustus's henchman
- Xander Madrid as Augustus's henchman
- Ricky Alma Jose as Augustus's henchman
- Kit Thompson as Alvin Daniega
- Gerald Gabonado as Bong's cellmate
- Anton Catral as Bong's cellmate
- Gino Ilustre as Don Ismael
- Lotlot Bustamante as Ibyang
- Johnny Revilla as Mr. Salazar
- Giemel Magramo as Gabriel "Gagamba" Gamboa
- Francis Mata as Mr. Tolentino
- Lauren Novero as Renan
- Mika Bernabe as Bianca
- Wilmar "Scarface" Peñaflorida as Augustus's henchman
- John Ching as Augustus's henchman
- Numerhus Maranan as Rod
- Ivan Carapiet as Diego
- Paolo Serrano as Paquito
- Nico Antonio as Simon
- Romy Romulo as Homer
- Jess Evardone as Gaspar
- Bart Guingona as Jail Chief Supt./BGEN Oscar Duran
- Erlinda Villalobos as Betchay Zaballa
- Pedro "Zaito" Canon Jr. as Zanjo
- Romarico "Crazymix" Superable as Jude "Botchok" Andulan
- Christian Carlo "Pistolero" Cañares as Kaloy
- Victor Silayan as PLT Luis Jacobe
- Jorel Ramirez as PLT Mario Samonte
- Ogunleye Olamide Ethan as Mogapi
- Whitney Tyson as Wilma
- Joe Vargas as Kingston
- Anne Feo as Lilian
- Jonic Magno as Nestor
- Alexis Tolentino as Alex
- Larry Estroso as Larry
- Michael Angelo Soberano as Mike
- Kiko Matos as Erik
- Raqs Regalado as Ruby
- KC Montero as Mr. Geronimo
- Bong Regala as Mr. Villegas
- Daniel "Tugue Zombie" Oke as Gold Buyer
- Will Devaughn as Gold Buyer
- Joseph Cabral as Tanggol's cellmate
- Robby Dizon as Tanggol's cellmate
- Vonz Lopez as Olga's henchman
- Sunshine Guimary as Atty. Romina Falcon
- Andrew Ramsay as Bobby
- Shernan Gaite as Chito
- Paolo Gumabao as Lawrence Oliverio
- Zeus Collins as Tisoy
- Thamara Alexandria as Phoebe
- Carlon Matobato as Tomas
- Angelica Lao as Angelica
- Romeo "Dagul" Pastrana as Pido
- Jkhriez Pastrana as Pipay
- Jona De Flore as Jona
- Rod Navarro Jr. as Dindo
- Mark Dionisio as Ramil
- Rolando Inocencio as Sebyo
- Mae Paner as Conchita
- Uldario "Negi" Molina Jr. as Aloha
- Maika Rivera as Atty. Vera Saldivar
- Junjun Quintana as Dr. Manuel Dagohoy
- Melissa Mendez as Marisol Pamintuan
- Roshon Barman as Vince
- Albert Bryan as Queenzy
- Johannes Rissler as Egay "Pierre" Angeles
- Lloyd Samartino as Isidro "Henry" Angeles
- Cristina Gonzales as Leonarda "Margaret" Angeles
- Dayal Chowdhary as Isaac
- Bombi Plata as Maning
- Dexie Diaz as Annika
- Franki Russell as Allyry
- Pokski Ramirez as Opok
- Marlon Tourette as Marlon
- Jonas Dichoso as Jonas Jay "Jojo" Pamatpat
- Antonio "Mastafeat" Cajuban Jr. as Pito
- Muriel Anne "Sisa" Jamito as Sonia
- Lordivino "Bassilyo" Ignacio as Teban
- Marco "Kial" Alkadama as Theodoro "Toryo" Paanum
- Raymond Buensuceso "Flict-G" Rivera as Rocky
- Bryan "Smugglaz" Lao as Kidlat
- Pontri Bernardo as PBGEN Avelino Rivas
- Richard Somes as Donato
- Andres "Kuya Bata" Balano Jr. as Andoy
- Hyubs Azarcon as Onyok Bersamin
- Jeri Montano as Eddy Villanueva
- Maynard Lapid as Paul
- Sue Prado as Gina Camacho
- Myra Manibog as Myra
- Sarsi Emmanuelle as Sarsi
- Coca Nicolas as Coca
- Ernie Garcia as Ernesto Dimapilis
- Myrna Castillo as Myrna Dimapilis
- Sandy Aloba as Sandy
- Lei Ang as Sheila
- Malou Canzana as Former Councilor Shiela Querubin
- Bong Russo as Former Councilor Mario Tansyco
- Bobby Henson as Nanding

== See also ==
- List of Batang Quiapo episodes
