= List of Batang Quiapo episodes =

FPJ's Batang Quiapo is a Philippine action drama series broadcast by Kapamilya Channel. It premiered on the network's Primetime Bida evening block (Note: The series also airs on was aired on its primary network Kapamilya Channel as well as other affiliate blocktime channels and platforms and Saturday marathon on Cine Mo!. It is also available for streaming on-demand via Kapamilya Online Live with advanced episodes on iWant, and internationally via TFC.) and worldwide via The Filipino Channel from February 13, 2023 to March 13, 2026, replacing Mars Ravelo's Darna.

== Series overview ==
Story arc	Episodes	Originally released	
Story arc	Episodes	First released	Last released
1	263	February 13, 2023	February 16, 2024
2	268	February 19, 2024	February 28, 2025
3	268	March 3, 2025	March 13, 2026

== Episodes ==
=== Story Arc 1: Identity and Heritage (2023–2024) ===
==== Chapter 1 ====
The story revolves around the Dimaguiba family's whereabouts in Quiapo from Ramon's involvement with the maternal Dimaguiba which bore Tanggol into the world of slums. 20 years later, a determined Ramon seeks to reclaim the heir of the Montenegro family.

No. overall	No. in chapter	Title	TV title	Original release date	AGB Nielsen Ratings (NUTAM People)	Timeslot rank
1	1	"Ang Pag-usbong ng Batang Quiapo" (transl. The Rise of Quiapo Kid)	"Batang Quiapo Day"	February 13, 2023	12.5%	#2
2	2	"Sino Nga Ba si Tanggol?" (transl. Who Is Tanggol?)	"Tanggol"	February 14, 2023	12.2%	#1
3	3	"Buhay Quiapo" (transl. Life in Quiapo)	"Buhay Quiapo"	February 15, 2023	13.8%	#1
4	4	"Takas ni Ramon" (transl. Ramon's Escape)	"Date"	February 16, 2023	13.2%	#1
5	5	"Mga Banta ng Sigwa" (transl. Threats of Sigwa)	"Kastigo"	February 17, 2023	13.4%	#1
6	6	"Ang Pagbawi ni Tanggol" (transl. Tanggol's Recovery)	"Nakaraan"	February 20, 2023	12.0%	#2
7	7	"Mga Anak ng Quiapo" (transl. The Sons of Quiapo)	"Supremo"	February 21, 2023	11.6%	#2
8	8	"Engkwentro" (transl. Encounter)	"Peligro"	February 22, 2023	12.5%	#1
9	9	"Mga Sugat Noon, Mga Sugat Ngayon" (transl. Wounds Then, Wounds Now)	"Ligtas"	February 23, 2023	12.2%	#2
10	10	"Ang Pinakamalalim na Sugat" (transl. The Deepest Wound)	"Sugat"	February 24, 2023	12.2%	#2
11	11	"Ang Hinagpis ni Tanggol" (transl. Tanggol's Sorrow)	"Kaguluhan"	February 27, 2023	12.9%	#1
12	12	"Malalalim na Tunggalian" (transl. Deep Rivalry)	"Habol"	February 28, 2023	12.1%	#1
13	13	"Pagkamatay at Pagkabuhay" (transl. Death and Resurrection)	"Katapusan"	March 1, 2023	13.3%	#1
14	14	"Tagumpay ni Rigor" (transl. Rigor's Success)	"Katarungan"	March 2, 2023	12.0%	#1
15	15	"Mga Nagbabadyang Sakuna" (transl. Impending Disasters)	"Plano"	March 3, 2023	11.5%	#2
16	16	"Maling Akala" (transl. Wrong Suspicion)	"Pagtanggap"	March 6, 2023	11.8%	#2
17	17	"Ang Ginibang Puwesto" (transl. Dismantled Position)	"Banta"	March 7, 2023	12.0%	#1
18	18	"Ang Muling Pagbangon" (transl. Resurgence)	"Kaanib"	March 8, 2023	12.5%	#1
19	19	"Inapi ng Salapi" (transl. Oppressed by Money)	"Kupit"	March 9, 2023	12.3%	#1
20	20	"Bulag ang Katarungan" (transl. Justice is Blind)	"Bilanggo"	March 10, 2023	11.6%	#1
21	21	"Piyansa" (transl. Bail)	"Transaksyon"	March 13, 2023	12.2%	#1
22	22	"Nakaw" (transl. Steal)	"Akyat Bahay"	March 14, 2023	N/A	TBA
23	23	"Huramentado" (transl. Sworn)	"Tuluyan"	March 15, 2023	12.7%	#1
24	24	"Sugod-bahay" (transl. House Invasion)	"Eskandalo"	March 16, 2023	12.2%	#1
25	25	"Utang" (transl. Debt)	"Utang"	March 17, 2023	12.6%	#1
26	26	"Higanti" (transl. Revenge)	"Nilooban"	March 20, 2023	12.2%	#1
27	27	"Kasinungalingan at Kalayaan" (transl. Lies and Freedom)	"Negosasyon"	March 21, 2023	12.0%	#1
28	28	"Laya" (transl. Free)	"Paghahanda"	March 22, 2023	11.6%	#1
29	29	"Mga Panibagong Paghahanda" (transl. New Preparations)	"Pera"	March 23, 2023	11.7%	#2
30	30	"Magulang at Kakampi" (transl. Parent and Ally)	"Bisita"	March 24, 2023	12.2%	#1
31	31	"Imbitasyon" (transl. Invitation)	"Balak"	March 27, 2023	12.7%	#1
32	32	"Salubong" (transl. Welcome)	"Salubong"	March 28, 2023	11.1%	#2
33	33	"Masamang Balak" (transl. Bad Plan)	"Buhos"	March 29, 2023	12.9%	#1
34	34	"Inis at Galit" (transl. Annoyance and Anger)	"Tuloy"	March 30, 2023	11.3%	#1
35	35	"Ganti ni Mokang" (transl. Mokang's Revenge)	"Dispensa"	March 31, 2023	12.7%	#1
36	36	"Pananamantala" (transl. Exploitation)	"Pagsugod	April 3, 2023	12.1%	#1
37	37	"Agresibo" (transl. Aggressive)	"Handa"	April 4, 2023	12.3%	#1
38	38	"Bagong Porma" (transl. New Form)	"Pagtatapatan"	April 5, 2023	11.5%	#1
39	39	"Simula ng Kasiyahan" (transl. Beginning of Fun)	"Debut"	April 10, 2023	11.4%	#1
40	40	"Sayaw" (transl. Dance)	"Selebrasyon"	April 11, 2023	13.0%	#1
41	41	"Tinik o Rosas" (transl. Thorn or Rose)	"Last Dance"	April 12, 2023	14.0%	#1
42	42	"Kontra" (transl. Against)	"Tapatan"	April 13, 2023	13.5%	#1
43	43	"Unang Halik" (transl. First Kiss)	"Panaginip"	April 14, 2023	N/A	TBA
44	44	"Singilan" (transl. Charge)	"Suspendido"	April 17, 2023	N/A	TBA
45	45	"Maiinit na Salubong" (transl. Warm Welcome)	"Kaugnayan"	April 18, 2023	N/A	TBA
46	46	"Pagsamo ni Mokang" (transl. Mokang's Plea)	"Sitwasyon"	April 19, 2023	N/A	TBA
47	47	"Gulo sa Eskuwelahan" (transl. Trouble at School)	"Patibong"	April 20, 2023	N/A	TBA
48	48	"Hijack"	"Nakita"	April 21, 2023	N/A	TBA
49	49	"Inuman" (transl. Drink)	"Panliligaw"	April 24, 2023	N/A	TBA
50	50	"Lakas ni Amanda" (transl. Amanda's Strength)	"Linisin"	April 25, 2023	N/A	TBA
51	51	"Pag-uwi" (transl. Going Home)	"Mapusok"	April 26, 2023	N/A	TBA
52	52	"Gabi ng Tukso" (transl. Night of Temptation)	"Inom"	April 27, 2023	N/A	TBA
53	53	"Mga Kasinungalingan" (transl. Lies)	"TangKang"	April 28, 2023	N/A	TBA
54	54	"Oportunidad" (transl. Opportunities)	"Magulang"	May 1, 2023	N/A	TBA
55	55	"Dagdag-Palugit" (transl. Extension)	"Interes"	May 2, 2023	N/A	TBA
56	56	"Expel"	"Mag-aral"	May 3, 2023	N/A	TBA
57	57	"Bagong Negosyo" (transl. New Business)	"Scholarship"	May 4, 2023	N/A	TBA
58	58	"Wanted"	"Pagbabago"	May 5, 2023	11.5%	#1

==== Chapter 2 ====
Tanggol's fight with JP makes him a fugitive from the cops and gets Mokang expelled. With nowhere else to go, he seeks Berting's help to change his life.

No. overall	No. in chapter	Title	TV title	Original release date	AGB Nielsen Ratings (NUTAM People)	Timeslot rank
59	1	"Lalaban nang Patas" (transl. Fighting Fairly)	"Bagong Simula"	May 8, 2023	10.6%	#2
60	2	"Bagong Buhay nila Tanggol" (transl. Their new life with Tanggol)	"Trabaho"	May 9, 2023	11.2%	#2
61	3	"Kasal at Laglagan" (transl. Marriage and Divorce)	"Pagsisikap"	May 10, 2023	10.7%	#2
62	4	"Simula ng Digmaan" (transl. The Beginning of the War)	"Bulilyaso"	May 11, 2023	10.9%	#2
63	5	"Raid"	"Habulan"	May 12, 2023	11.4%	#2
64	6	"Pagtatagpo ng Mag-ama" (transl. The Father and Son's Reunion)	"Namarkahan"	May 15, 2023	10.7%	#2
65	7	"Ang Nawawalang Anak" (transl. The Lost Son)	"Strange Day"	May 16, 2023	N/A	TBA
66	8	"Espiya" (transl. Spy)	"Kikilos"	May 17, 2023	N/A	TBA
67	9	"Bundol" (transl. Mound)	"Hanapin"	May 18, 2023	N/A	TBA
68	10	"Gulpi" (transl. Beaten Up)	"Nadaanan"	May 19, 2023	N/A	TBA
69	11	"Pagbawi at Trahedya" (transl. Recovery and Tragedy)	"Malapit"	May 22, 2023	12.6%	#1
70	12	"Pagbabalik sa Nakaraan" (transl. A Return to the Past)	"Balikan"	May 23, 2023	12.8%	#1
71	13	"Para-paraan" (transl. Method)	"Salba"	May 24, 2023	10.9%	#2
72	14	"Plano sa Pagsuko" (transl. Plan to Surrender)	"Isuko"	May 25, 2023	12.0%	#2
73	15	"Sugod" (transl. Rush)	"Unahan"	May 26, 2023	12.1%	#2
74	16	"Sagupaan sa Quiapo" (transl. Clash in Quiapo)	"Tutukan"	May 29, 2023	13.4%	#2
75	17	"Pag-aalala at Panaginip" (transl. Worries and Dreams)	"Greg"	May 30, 2023	14.0%	#1
76	18	"Kambal ng Malas" (transl. Twin in Misfortune)	"Kriminal"	May 31, 2023	13.3%	#1
77	19	"Ganti ni Olga" (transl. Olga's Revenge)	"Ganti"	June 1, 2023	12.7%	#1
78	20	"Pagpalayas" (transl. Eviction)	"Paraan"	June 2, 2023	12.6%	#1
79	21	"Desperasyon" (transl. Desperation)	"Gipit"	June 5, 2023	12.6%	#2
80	22	"Unang Gabi" (transl. First Night)	"Bantayan"	June 6, 2023	12.7%	#1
81	23	"Resbak ni Edwin" (transl. Edwin's Revenge)	"Panloloob"	June 7, 2023	12.3%	#2
82	24	"Selos at Pangamba" (transl. Jealousy and Fear)	"Bantay"	June 8, 2023	13.2%	#1
83	25	"Pera o Puso" (transl. Money or Heart)	"Selos"	June 9, 2023	12.5%	#2
84	26	"Tambang" (transl. Ambush)	"Harangin"	June 12, 2023	12.4%	#2
85	27	"Simula ng Tapatan" (transl. The Beginning of the Showdown)	"Planado"	June 13, 2023	12.8%	#1
86	28	"Trabaho" (transl. Work)	"Bagong Trabaho"	June 14, 2023	12.2%	#2
87	29	"Ang Palitan" (transl. Change)	"Naipit"	June 15, 2023	13.6%	#1
88	30	"Harap-harapan" (transl. Face to Face)	"Hawak sa Leeg"	June 16, 2023	12.5%	#2
89	31	"Tanan" (transl. Everyone)	"Guho"	June 19, 2023	12.5%	#2
90	32	"Pagpapanggap at Pagmamahal" (transl. Pretense and Love).	"Masama"	June 20, 2023	12.9%	#1
91	33	"Desperado" (transl. Desperate)	"Magulang"	June 21, 2023	12.7%	#1
92	34	"Kalaban sa Bahay" (transl. An Enemy in the House)	"Maniningil"	June 22, 2023	13.5%	#1
93	35	"Dukot" (transl. Abduct)	"Kapatid"	June 23, 2023	12.0%	#2
94	36	"Showdown"	"Tiktik"	June 26, 2023	13.6%	#1
95	37	"Masamang Balak" (transl. Evil Plans)	"Official Report"	June 27, 2023	12.4%	#2
96	38	"Bagabag" (transl. Apprehended)	"Hostess"	June 28, 2023	14.0%	#1
97	39	"Kabayaran at Paniningil" (transl. Payback and Retribution)	"Bagong Buhay"	June 29, 2023	13.8%	#1
98	40	"Sistemador" (transl. The Schemer)	"Gusot"	June 30, 2023	11.8%	#2
99	41	"Dalaw" (transl. Visit)	"Dalaw"	July 3, 2023	12.0%	#2
100	42	"Wanted"	"Swerte"	July 4, 2023	11.7%	#2
101	43	"Anomalya" (transl. Anomaly)	"Pinagpalit"	July 5, 2023	13.5%	#1
102	44	"Upang ang Tagapagligtas" (transl. To the Savior)	"Para kay Tatay"	July 6, 2023	12.9%	#1
103	45	"Harana"	"Harana"	July 7, 2023	12.3%	#1
104	46	"Pag-Asa" (transl. Hope)	"Pag-asa"	July 10, 2023	13.0%	#1
105	47	"Akusasyon" (transl. Accusation)	"Madilim"	July 11, 2023	11.7%	#2
106	48	"Bisita" (transl. Visitor)	"Request"	July 12, 2023	11.6%	#2
107	49	"Ang Balita tungkol sa Espiya" (transl. News about the Spy)	"Utakan"	July 13, 2023	12.6%	#2
108	50	"May Bagong Salita pa rin" (transl. There's Still a New Word)	"Daan"	July 14, 2023	12.5%	#2
109	51	"Buy-Bust"	"Lambat"	July 17, 2023	12.4%	#2
110	52	"Upang ang Nawawalang Droga" (transl. To the Missing Drug)	"Abangan at Subaybayan"	July 18, 2023	13.5%	#1
111	53	"Mas may Buntot" (transl. With a Longer Tail)	"Susundan"	July 19, 2023	13.6%	#1
112	54	"Regalo" (transl. Gift)	"Surpresa"	July 20, 2023	12.1%	#3
113	55	"Sa Pagtatapat" (transl. In Confession)	"Dignidad"	July 21, 2023	13.1%	#1
114	56	"Anak" (transl. Child)	"Sino Ka Ba?"	July 24, 2023	13.0%	#1
115	57	"Ang Kapit sa Patalim" (transl. Living in a Dangerous Situation)	"Walang Kapalit"	July 25, 2023	13.2%	#1
116	58	"Paninigurado" (transl. Assurance)	"DNA"	July 26, 2023	13.6%	#2
117	59	"Kupit" (transl. Filch)	"Straight"	July 27, 2023	14.0%	#1
118	60	"Resulta" (transl. Result)	"Resulta"	July 28, 2023	13.8%	#1
119	61	"Upang ang Pekeng Tanggol" (transl. To the Fake Tanggol's Defense)	"Desisyon"	July 31, 2023	13.4%	#2
120	62	"Delivery Boy"	"Pasya"	August 1, 2023	13.5%	#1
121	63	"Sa Dobleng Duda" (transl. In Double Doubt)	"Deliver"	August 2, 2023	14.5%	#1
122	64	"Ang Limpak-limpak na Salapi" (transl. The Piles of Money)	"Solusyon"	August 3, 2023	14.0%	#1
123	65	"Saklolo" (transl. Rescue)	"Yabang"	August 4, 2023	13.3%	#2
124	66	"Date"	"Prinsesa"	August 7, 2023	14.9%	#1
125	67	"Pagtago" (transl. Hiding)	"Nakaw"	August 8, 2023	13.9%	#1
126	68	"Takas" (transl. Escape)	"Habulan"	August 9, 2023	13.2%	#1
127	69	"Puri" (transl. Praise)	"Pambayad"	August 10, 2023	13.8%	#1
128	70	"Walang Laban" (transl. No Fight)	"Patakasin"	August 11, 2023	13.3%	#1
129	71	"Agaw Buhay" (transl. On the Brink of Dying)	"Ibang Trato"	August 14, 2023	14.5%	#1
130	72	"Operasyon" (transl. Operation)	"Pinsala"	August 15, 2023	14.0%	#1
131	73	"Ang Malayo sa Panganib" (transl. Far from Danger)	"Salamat sa Diyos"	August 16, 2023	14.2%	#1
132	74	"Engaged"	"Mug Shots"	August 17, 2023	14.0%	#1
133	75	"Kulong" (transl. Jail)	"Kalaboso"	August 18, 2023	14.1%	#1
134	76	"Dalaw" (transl. Visit)	"Magpaalam"	August 21, 2023	13.6%	#2
135	77	"Kompromiso" (transl. Compromise)	"Makilala"	August 22, 2023	14.2%	#1
136	78	"Ang Bangkay sa Ilog" (transl. The Corpse at the River)	"Siguro"	August 23, 2023	14.0%	#1
137	79	"Pagtakas" (transl. Escape)	"Suko"	August 24, 2023	13.9%	#1
138	80	"Pamilya at Katahimikan" (transl. Family and Peace)	"Big Time"	August 25, 2023	11.2%	#1
139	81	"Mga Bagong Salta" (transl. Newcomers)	"Pinapasok"	August 28, 2023	13.0%	#1
140	82	"Takot" (transl. Fear)	"Suko"	August 29, 2023	11.5%	#1
141	83	"Yakap" (transl. Hug)	"Mayakap"	August 30, 2023	13.8%	#1
142	84	"Hatol" (transl. Verdict)	"Hukom"	August 31, 2023	12.1%	#2
143	85	"Preso" (transl. Convict)	"Hatol"	September 1, 2023	13.3%	#2
144	86	"Welcome"	"Bilangguan"	September 4, 2023	13.5%	#2
145	87	"Mga Bulaklak sa Kasal" (transl. Wedding Flowers)	"Delikado"	September 5, 2023	13.2%	#2
146	88	"Dalamhati at Pagdiriwang" (transl. Grief and Celebration)	"Tatakas"	September 6, 2023	12.8%	#2
147	89	"Alaala" (transl. Memory)	"Ipagkait"	September 7, 2023	13.4%	#1
148	90	"Pasabog" (transl. Explosive)	"Pagpapahirap"	September 8, 2023	12.3%	#2

==== Chapter 3 ====
With his attempt of a new life failed, Tanggol and his friends are sent to a correctional facility led by Chief Warden Espinas. Eventually, Espinas makes her way to help Tanggol rise for the next mayoral cell of the prison hall by secretly working as her hitman.

No. overall	No. in chapter	Title	TV title	Original release date	AGB Nielsen Ratings (NUTAM People)	Timeslot rank
149	1	"Aftermath"	"Impyerno"	September 11, 2023	15.9%	#1
150	2	"Pagligpit" (transl. Termination)	"Bubbles"	September 12, 2023	16.8%	#1
151	3	"Mga Usisero, at Usisera" (transl. Curious Onlookers)	"Patakaran"	September 13, 2023	15.7%	#1
152	4	"Banta ni Bong" (transl. Bong's Threat)	"Ginagalawan"	September 14, 2023	16.0%	#1
153	5	"Pamalit" (transl. Replacement)	"Pamamalakad"	September 15, 2023	16.0%	#1
154	6	"Bagong Katiwala" (transl. New Trustee)	"Trustee"	September 18, 2023	16.4%	#1
155	7	"Trabaho" (transl. Work)	"Kamao"	September 19, 2023	16.4%	#1
156	8	"Nakalimutan" (transl. Forgotten)	"Abandona"	September 20, 2023	15.0%	#1
157	9	"Pagkukulang" (transl. Shortcoming)	"Pinili"	September 21, 2023	15.7%	#1
158	10	"Bisto" (transl. Caught)	"Bisto"	September 22, 2023	15.7%	#1
159	11	"Sunog" (transl. Fire)	"Sunog"	September 25, 2023	15.7%	#1
160	12	"Pagtataguan" (transl. Hiding Place)	"Niluluto"	September 26, 2023	15.6%	#1
161	13	"Bisita at Hinala" (transl. Visitor and Suspicion)	"Nakasilip"	September 27, 2023	16.2%	#1
162	14	"Tawag" (transl. Call)	"Pasaway"	September 28, 2023	17.0%	#1
163	15	"Bagansya" (transl. Vagrancy)	"Kandado"	September 29, 2023	16.4%	#1
164	16	"Resbak" (transl. Revenge)	"Buksan"	October 2, 2023	16.5%	#1
165	17	"Puwang" (transl. Space)	"Order"	October 3, 2023	15.9%	#1
166	18	"Kaibigan" (transl. Friend)	"Kaibigan"	October 4, 2023	15.8%	#1
167	19	"Bagong Misyon, Dating Gawi" (transl. New Mission, Old Ways)	"Patawag"	October 5, 2023	16.8%	#1
168	20	"Lipat-bahay" (transl. Moving to a New House)	"Kinarma"	October 6, 2023	14.5%	#1
169	21	"Lihim" (transl. Secret)	"Duda"	October 9, 2023	15.7%	#1
170	22	"Regalo"	"Puhunan"	October 10, 2023	16.5%	#1
171	23	"Balita at Banta" (transl. News and Threat)	"Kinakahan"	October 11, 2023	15.5%	#1
172	24	"Bagong Buhay o Kaibigan?" (transl. New Life or Friend?)	"Ipakita"	October 12, 2023	14.6%	#1
173	25	"Gulong ng Palad" (transl. Wheel of Fate)	"Umpisa"	October 13, 2023	16.9%	#1
174	26	"Bagong Bihis" (transl. New Look)	"Labas"	October 16, 2023	15.6%	#1
175	27	"Bantay Sarado" (transl. Closely Guarded)	"Pautang"	October 17, 2023	15.6%	#1
176	28	"Trabaho Lang" (transl. Just Work)	"Di Pwede"	October 18, 2023	16.1%	#1
177	29	"Bawal ang Duwag" (transl. Weakling Not Allowed)	"Di Pa Tapos"	October 19, 2023	15.7%	#1
178	30	"Pagsubok" (transl. Challenge)	"Unang Trabaho"	October 20, 2023	15.5%	#1
179	31	"Nagdadalawang Isip" (transl. Hesitate)	"Pambato"	October 23, 2023	16.0%	#1
180	32	"First Round"	"1 Round"	October 24, 2023	16.1%	#1
181	33	"Pabuya" (transl. Reward)	"Maangmaangan"	October 25, 2023	15.1%	#1
182	34	"Paalala" (transl. Reminder)	"Paalala"	October 26, 2023	15.5%	#1
183	35	"Masamang Intensyon" (transl. Bad Intention)	"Kolateral"	October 27, 2023	15.0%	#1
184	36	"Balato" (transl. Give Away)	"Tinginan"	October 30, 2023	15.8%	#1
185	37	"Bisperas" (transl. Eve)	"Konsensya"	October 31, 2023	13.0%	#1
186	38	"Nagbabadyang Banta" (transl. Impending Threat)	"Bawi"	November 1, 2023	13.8%	#1
187	39	"Bagong Trabaho" (transl. New Work)	"Sunod-Sunod"	November 2, 2023	14.6%	#1
188	40	"Patikim" (transl. Sample)	"Isama"	November 3, 2023	15.5%	#1
189	41	"Bangungot at Panaginip" (transl. Nightmares and Dreams)	"Pangako"	November 6, 2023	15.5%	#1
190	42	"Pista ng Quiapo" (transl. Feast of Quiapo)	"Bisperas"	November 7, 2023	16.2%	#1
191	43	"Pagtakas" (transl. Escape)	"Espesyal"	November 8, 2023	14.8%	#1
192	44	"Hadlang" (transl. Obstruction)	"Sugat"	November 9, 2023	15.1%	#1
193	45	"Paramdam ng Konsensya" (transl. Hint of Conscience)	"Kasado"	November 10, 2023	14.1%	#1
194	46	"Tunay na Negosyo" (transl. Real Business)	"Target"	November 13, 2023	15.9%	#1
195	47	"Paghahanda sa Tagapagmana" (transl. Preparing the Heir)	"Buntot"	November 14, 2023	15.9%	#1
196	48	"Panalo" (transl. Victorious)	"Nazarene Cup"	November 15, 2023	14.7%	#1
197	49	"Simula ng Palabas" (transl. Beginning of the Show)	"Successor"	November 16, 2023	15.4%	#1
198	50	"Tapatan" (transl. Honesty)	"Magpakilala"	November 17, 2023	14.6%	#1
199	51	"Eskapo" (transl. Break Free)	"Eskapo"	November 20, 2023	16.0%	#1
200	52	"Panapal" (transl. Poultice)	"Di Mahalata"	November 21, 2023	16.5%	#1
201	53	"Bunga" (transl. Consequent)	"Son"	November 22, 2023	15.0%	#1
202	54	"Iskandalo" (transl. Scandal)	"Mag-syota"	November 23, 2023	15.9%	#1
203	55	"Saklolo" (transl. Rescue)	"Ligtas"	November 24, 2023	14.5%	#1
204	56	"Tunay na Kulay" (transl. True Color)	"Dimaculangan"	November 27, 2023	15.3%	#1
205	57	"Ang Katotohanan" (transl. The Truth)	"Layas"	November 28, 2023	16.0%	#1
206	58	"Pangingikil" (transl. Extortion)	"Amo"	November 29, 2023	13.6%	#2
207	59	"Buhay mag-asawa" (transl. Married Life)	"Tira-tira"	November 30, 2023	15.7%	#1
208	60	"Pangunguila" (transl. Bereavement)	"Pupunuan"	December 1, 2023	14.5%	#1
209	61	"Intriga" (transl. Intrigue)	"Kapalit"	December 4, 2023	14.8%	#1
210	62	"Lihim at Pagliligtas" (transl. Secret and Rescue)	"Kulong"	December 5, 2023	15.8%	#1
211	63	"Muling Pagkikita" (transl. Reunion)	"Suspect"	December 6, 2023	13.1%	#1
212	64	"Tensyon" (transl. Tension)	"Gitna"	December 7, 2023	14.5%	#1
213	65	"Banta ng Panganib" (transl. Threat of Danger)	"Tagpo"	December 8, 2023	12.8%	#1
214	66	"Paglisan at Pagbabali" (transl. Departure and Return)	"Tinamaan"	December 11, 2023	14.5%	#1
215	67	"Panalangin" (transl. Prayer)	"Takas"	December 12, 2023	13.8%	#1
216	68	"Bisitang Lihim" (transl. Secret Visitor)	"Silip"	December 13, 2023	14.0%	#1
217	69	"Malikmata" (transl. Illusion)	"Malikmata"	December 14, 2023	14.0%	#1
218	70	"Tulong" (transl. Help)	"Tulong"	December 15, 2023	12.4%	#1
219	71	"Panganib ng Pag-ibig" (transl. Danger of Love)	"Yolly"	December 18, 2023	15.0%	#1
220	72	"Pagtatagpo sa Mansyon" (transl. Meeting at the Mansion)	"Pinto"	December 19, 2023	14.3%	#1
221	73	"Tugon sa Panalangin" (transl. Answer to Prayer)	"Bukas"	December 20, 2023	13.5%	#1
222	74	"Pag-ibig" (transl. Passion)	"Monique"	December 21, 2023	15.0%	#1
223	75	"Biktima ng Sagupaan" (transl. Victim of the Clash)	"Nalagas"	December 22, 2023	12.5%	#1
224	76	"Pabor" (transl. Privilege)	"Kwarto"	December 25, 2023	10.4%	#1
225	77	"Desisyon" (transl. Judgement)	"Di Nagseselos"	December 26, 2023	13.9%	#1
226	78	"Lamat" (transl. Rift)	"Basag"	December 27, 2023	12.7%	#1
227	79	"Apo" (transl. Grandson)	"Ikaw Lang"	December 28, 2023	13.8%	#1
228	80	"Walang Hanggang Panganib" (transl. Eternal Danger)	"Pangungulila"	December 29, 2023	13.0%	#1
229	81	"Kampihan" (transl. Side)	"Kalas"	January 1, 2024	12.7%	#1
230	82	"Habulan Tungo sa Katotohanan" (transl. Pursuit of Truth)	"Walang Iwanan"	January 2, 2024	13.7%	#1
231	83	"Huling Estasyon" (transl. Last Station)	"Habulan"	January 3, 2024	13.2%	#1
232	84	"Mokang" (transl. Monique)	"Mokang"	January 4, 2024	13.9%	#1
233	85	"Paalam" (transl. Farewell)	"Sampaguita"	January 5, 2024	13.7%	#1
234	86	"Balik Kulungan" (transl. Back to Jail)	"Di Pinabayaan"	January 8, 2024	15.0%	#1
235	87	"Luha" (transl. Tears)	"Bantay Sarado"	January 9, 2024	15.5%	#1
236	88	"Dulot ng Trahedya" (transl. Caused by Tragedy)	"Lumalambot"	January 10, 2024	14.9%	#1
237	89	"Utos" (transl. Command)	"Bumalik"	January 11, 2024	15.4%	#1
238	90	"Walang Imik" (transl. Speechless)	"Dalamhati"	January 12, 2024	12.9%	#1
239	91	"Pagsisisi" (transl. Repentance)	"Nadurog"	January 15, 2024	14.7%	#1
240	92	"Kutob at Katotohanan" (transl. Foreboding and Truth)	"Kalungkutan"	January 16, 2024	13.8%	#1
241	93	"Pagluluksa" (transl. Mourning)	"Pinagdadaanan"	January 17, 2024	13.0%	#1
242	94	"Ina sa Ina" (transl. Mother to Mother)	"Di Makakalabas"	January 18, 2024	14.8%	#1
243	95	"Pagkawala ng Pag-asa" (transl. Loss of Hope)	"Pinapalabas"	January 19, 2024	12.8%	#1
244	96	"Karamay" (transl. Sympathy)	"Maibsan"	January 22, 2024	14.0%	#1
245	97	"Namumuong Poot" (transl. Brewing Hatred)	"Laban Yolly"	January 23, 2024	13.5%	#1
246	98	"Mabuting Kaibigan" (transl. Good Friend)	"Nagmahal"	January 24, 2024	12.2%	#2
247	99	"Imbestigasyon" (transl. Investigation)	"Pakiusap"	January 25, 2024	14.0%	#1
248	100	"Higanti" (transl. Revenge)	"Laya"	January 26, 2024	12.8%	#1
249	101	"Dalaw ng Nakaraan" (transl. Visit of the Past)	"Imbestigasyon"	January 29, 2024	12.8%	#2
250	102	"Samantha"	"Olga"	January 30, 2024	14.8%	#1
251	103	"Transaksyon" (transl. Transaction)	"Resbak"	January 31, 2024	12.9%	#2
252	104	"Resbakan" (transl. Retaliation)	"Engkwentro"	February 1, 2024	14.2%	#2
253	105	"Lusot" (transl. Slip Through)	"Tiwala"	February 2, 2024	14.0%	#1
254	106	"Pugante" (transl. Fugitive)	"Edwin"	February 5, 2024	13.8%	#2
255	107	"Senyora Bettina" (transl. Señora Bettina)	"Bettina"	February 6, 2024	14.0%	#1
256	108	"Laban ni Santino" (transl. Santino's Fight)	"Magsimula Muli"	February 7, 2024	11.8%	#2
257	109	"Huli" (transl. Caught)	"Napatunayan"	February 8, 2024	14.7%	#1
258	110	"Sumbong" (transl. Complaint)	"Di Titigil"	February 9, 2024	12.9%	#1
259	111	"Bulag-Bulagan" (transl. Blindsided)	"Reklamo"	February 12, 2024	13.7%	#1
260	112	"Baril at Balisong" (transl. Guns and Weapons)	"Takot"	February 13, 2024	14.2%	#1
261	113	"Alalay at Saklolo" (transl. Support and Help)	"Kanti"	February 14, 2024	12.5%	#1
262	114	"Pagkukunwari" (transl. Hypocrisy)	"Doble Ingat"	February 15, 2024	14.2%	#1
263	115	"Sorpresa" (transl. Surprise)	"Huwad"	February 16, 2024	14.6%	#1

=== Story Arc 2: Acquittal and Revenge (2024–2025) ===
==== Chapter 4 ====
Tanggol starts anew once more following his application for decent work. As he gets to learn more about Mokang's death, a new crime family is introduced.

No. overall	No. in chapter	Title	TV title	Original release date	AGB Nielsen Ratings (NUTAM People)	Timeslot rank
264	1	"Unang Pagpatay" (transl. First Kill)	"Panaginip"	February 19, 2024	15.9%	#1
265	2	"Prison Week"	"Prison Week"	February 20, 2024	16.0%	#1
266	3	"Marcelo"	"Naglayas"	February 21, 2024	16.0%	#1
267	4	"Riot"	"Rambol"	February 22, 2024	15.0%	#1
268	5	"Tamang Hinala" (transl. Right Suspicion)	"Riot"	February 23, 2024	16.1%	#1
269	6	"Bagong Hari" (transl. The New King)	"Mabuhay si Tanggol"	February 26, 2024	15.5%	#1
270	7	"Poot ng Paghihiganti" (transl. Hatred of Revenge)	"Kabahan"	February 27, 2024	14.7%	#1
271	8	"Takas" (transl. Fugitive)	"Tatakas Na"	February 28, 2024	16.0%	#1
272	9	"Inuman" (transl. Drinking Session)	"Labas"	February 29, 2024	15.6%	#1
273	10	"Bagong Kaibigan" (transl. New Friend)	"Pugante"	March 1, 2024	14.5%	#1
274	11	"Plano" (transl. Plan)	"Paghandaan"	March 4, 2024	16.9%	#1
275	12	"Recruit"	"Marcelo Macaraig"	March 5, 2024	15.0%	#1
276	13	"Karamay" (transl. Sympathy)	"Di Makakalaya"	March 6, 2024	15.5%	#1
277	14	"Katapatan" (transl. Probity)	"Maaasahan"	March 7, 2024	15.5%	#1
278	15	"Umasa" (transl. Hope)	"Umasa"	March 8, 2024	14.7%	#1
279	16	"Sikreto" (transl. Secret)	"Kaibiganin"	March 11, 2024	14.1%	#1
280	17	"Impluwensya" (transl. Influence)	"Paasahin"	March 12, 2024	14.1%	#1
281	18	"Manipula" (transl. Manipulate)	"Iipitin"	March 13, 2024	14.4%	#1
282	19	"Sombrero" (transl. Cap)	"Mamimiss Kita"	March 14, 2024	13.7%	#1
283	20	"Magandang Balita" (transl. Good News)	"Pagkakataon"	March 15, 2024	13.2%	#2
284	21	"Motibo" (transl. Motive)	"Di Papayag"	March 18, 2024	16.0%	#1
285	22	"Pagtatapat" (transl. Confession)	"Ipanalo"	March 19, 2024	14.0%	#1
286	23	"Hatol" (transl. Judgment)	"Hinatulan"	March 20, 2024	16.0%	#1
287	24	"Utang" (transl. Debt)	"Di Pinalad"	March 21, 2024	16.0%	#1
288	25	"Naguguluhang Damdamin" (transl. Confused Feelings)	"Nakikiusap"	March 22, 2024	14.7%	#1
289	26	"Direksyon" (transl. Direction)	"Makakabuo"	March 25, 2024	14.7%	#1
290	27	"Pangako at Pasasalamat" (transl. Promise and Gratitude)	"Wag Mag-alala"	March 26, 2024	13.1%	#1
291	28	"Tropa" (transl. Friend)	"Lakas ng Loob"	March 27, 2024	13.5%	#1
292	29	"Paglaya" (transl. Liberation)	"Release Order"	April 1, 2024	14.9%	#1
293	30	"Pagbabalik sa Quiapo" (transl. Return to Quiapo)	"Malaya"	April 2, 2024	14.8%	#1
294	31	"Pinalayas" (transl. Kicked Out)	"Nakalaya si Tanggol"	April 3, 2024	15.2%	#1
295	32	"Kapalaran ni Tanggol" (transl. Tanggol's Fate)	"Iwas Gulo"	April 4, 2024	16.0%	#1
296	33	"Simula ng Bagong Buhay" (transl. Beginning of a New Life)	"Sumasagip"	April 5, 2024	13.9%	#1
297	34	"Renta" (transl. Rent)	"Utang na Loob"	April 8, 2024	14.7%	#1
298	35	"Tondo at Binondo" (transl. Tondo and Binondo)	"Hanap Trabaho"	April 9, 2024	13.9%	#1
299	36	"Pagpoprotekta" (transl. Protection)	"Umpisa"	April 10, 2024	14.5%	#1
300	37	"Promosyon" (transl. Promotion)	"Ex-Convict"	April 11, 2024	15.2%	#1
301	38	"Huwag Umasa" (transl. Do Not Expect)	"Wag Umasa"	April 12, 2024	14.2%	#1
302	39	"Tropa Lang" (transl. Just Friends)	"Tropa Tayo"	April 15, 2024	14.7%	#1
303	40	"Beng"	"Lumalapit"	April 16, 2024	15.0%	#1
304	41	"Pagbibisita" (transl. Visit)	"Tulong ni Primo"	April 17, 2024	15.0%	#1
305	42	"Manghuhula" (transl. Fortune Teller)	"Siya Yun"	April 18, 2024	14.8%	#1
306	43	"Ukay-Ukay" (transl. Thrift Shop)	"Mahulog"	April 19, 2024	14.0%	#1
307	44	"Utang na Loob" (transl. Indebtedness)	"Wag Demonyohin"	April 22, 2024	15.6%	#1
308	45	"Paghaharap" (transl. Confrontation)	"Dina Nahiya"	April 23, 2024	15.1%	#1
309	46	"Mga Tagapagmana" (transl. Heirs)	"Di Kilala"	April 24, 2024	15.0%	#1
310	47	"Dayo ng Bilyaran" (transl. Stranger at the Billiards)	"Pinapaboran"	April 25, 2024	14.1%	#1
311	48	"Bilyar" (transl. Billiards)	"Bilyar"	April 26, 2024	14.8%	#1
312	49	"Pusta" (transl. Bet)	"Pusta"	April 29, 2024	15.0%	#1
313	50	"Pagkatalo" (transl. Defeat)	"Kolateral"	April 30, 2024	14.5%	#1
314	51	"Hukay" (transl. Grave)	"Hirap"	May 1, 2024	13.2%	#1
315	52	"Singsing" (transl. Ring)	"Kotong"	May 2, 2024	15.0%	#1
316	53	"Bisita" (transl. Visitor)	"Kilalanin"	May 3, 2024	14.0%	#1
317	54	"Sundo" (transl. Fetch)	"Pag-iingat"	May 6, 2024	14.5%	#1
318	55	"Pagdalaw" (transl. Visit)	"Dinalaw"	May 7, 2024	14.5%	#1
319	56	"Date"	"Frida"	May 8, 2024	15.1%	#1
320	57	"Bawi" (transl. Recover)	"Nakikinig"	May 9, 2024	14.0%	#1
321	58	"Isa Laban sa Dalawa" (transl. One Against Two)	"Babawi"	May 10, 2024	14.0%	#1
322	59	"Take Home"	"Ipupusta"	May 13, 2024	15.0%	#1
323	60	"Rematch"	"Sargo"	May 14, 2024	15.8%	#1
324	61	"Pagbabalik" (transl. Return)	"Para kay Tanggol"	May 15, 2024	14.0%	#1
325	62	"Cook Off"	"Nagseselos"	May 16, 2024	15.0%	#1
326	63	"Libre" (transl. Treated)	"Ina"	May 17, 2024	13.6%	#1
327	64	"Pagsasalo" (transl. Sharing)	"Wag Magpakita"	May 20, 2024	14.6%	#1
328	65	"Luha Para sa Ina" (transl. Tears for Mother)	"Di Bibitaw"	May 21, 2024	14.3%	#1
329	66	"Sugod ng Anak" (transl. The Child Rushes)	"Mamamatay Tao"	May 22, 2024	13.3%	#1
330	67	"Ospital" (transl. Hospital)	"Sinungaling"	May 23, 2024	12.9%	#1
331	68	"Kakampi" (transl. Ally)	"Laging Nandito"	May 24, 2024	13.4%	#1
332	69	"Biniling Mundo" (transl. Bought World)	"Bibilhin"	May 27, 2024	14.2%	#1
333	70	"Kondisyon" (transl. Condition)	"Apektado"	May 28, 2024	12.9%	#1
334	71	"Bagong Amo" (transl. New Boss)	"May-Ari"	May 29, 2024	12.9%	#1
335	72	"Nararamdaman" (transl. Felt)	"Nararamdaman"	May 30, 2024	14.5%	#1
336	73	"Alberto"	"Sagutan"	May 31, 2024	13.0%	#1

==== Chapter 5 ====
Tanggol's promise to a new life is once more broken with Bubbles' demise. Following the downfall of the Caballero family, Tanggol receives an opportunity to work with the secret businesswoman Divina Juanillo.

No. overall	No. in chapter	Title	TV title	Original release date	AGB Nielsen Ratings (NUTAM People)	Timeslot rank
337	1	"Pag-aalala" (transl. Concern)	"Suyo"	June 3, 2024	13.6%	#1
338	2	"Pinaplano" (transl. Planning)	"Pagmamatyag"	June 4, 2024	14.0%	#1
339	3	"Patibong" (transl. Snare)	"Alberto"	June 5, 2024	14.0%	#1
340	4	"Tatlong Grupo" (transl. Three Groups)	"Nangibabaw"	June 6, 2024	13.4%	#2
341	5	"Tapatan" (transl. Face Off)	"Harapan"	June 7, 2024	13.0%	#1
342	6	"Pagkatapos ng Laban" (transl. After the Battle)	"Katanungan"	June 10, 2024	15.0%	#1
343	7	"Pagdadalawang-isip" (transl. Second Thoughts)	"Nanalamin"	June 11, 2024	15.0%	#1
344	8	"Tunay na Kalaban" (transl. Real Enemy)	"Di Masisi"	June 12, 2024	13.5%	#1
345	9	"Inspirasyon" (transl. Inspiration)	"Notoryus"	June 13, 2024	15.5%	#1
346	10	"Kakampi" (transl. Ally)	"Mahalaga"	June 14, 2024	14.6%	#1
347	11	"Kaarawan" (transl. Birthday)	"Celebrate"	June 17, 2024	14.3%	#1
348	12	"Dasal sa Kaarawan" (transl. Birthday Prayer)	"Happy Birthday"	June 18, 2024	13.7%	#1
349	13	"Boksingero ng Quiapo" (transl. Quiapo Boxer)	"Sparring"	June 19, 2024	14.1%	#1
350	14	"Resbak ng Kuya" (transl. Brother's Support)	"Kuya"	June 20, 2024	16.5%	#1
351	15	"Dukot" (transl. Abducted)	"Rosaryo"	June 21, 2024	14.4%	#1
352	16	"Pagbabalik sa Quiapo" (transl. Return to Quiapo)	"Nasan si Bubbles?"	June 24, 2024	14.2%	#1
353	17	"Paghahanap" (transl. Search)	"Salisi"	June 25, 2024	15.0%	#1
354	18	"Baril at Balisong" (transl. Guns and Weapons)	"Sugod"	June 26, 2024	16.0%	#1
355	19	"Tago" (transl. Hide)	"Gaganti"	June 27, 2024	16.1%	#1
356	20	"Pagsisisi" (transl. Repentance)	"Hahanapin si Pablo"	June 28, 2024	14.4%	#1
357	21	"Durog" (transl. Crushed)	"Durog"	July 1, 2024	14.4%	#1
358	22	"Abang" (transl. Spy)	"Atraso"	July 2, 2024	16.5%	#1
359	23	"Martilyo" (transl. Hammer)	"Martilyo"	July 3, 2024	17.1%	#1
360	24	"Sagasa" (transl. Run Over)	"Sagasa"	July 4, 2024	16.0%	#1
361	25	"Promosyon" (transl. Promotion)	"Lakas"	July 5, 2024	16.2%	#1
362	26	"Pangungumbinsi" (transl. Persuasion)	"Panabla"	July 8, 2024	15.0%	#1
363	27	"Palaisipan" (transl. Riddle)	"Kutsilyo"	July 9, 2024	16.2%	#1
364	28	"Makatarungan" (transl. Fair)	"Panimula"	July 10, 2024	16.2%	#1
365	29	"Pagtapat" (transl. Confession)	"Maghihintay"	July 11, 2024	16.2%	#1
366	30	"Trabaho" (transl. Job)	"Ragasa"	July 12, 2024	16.0%	#1
367	31	"Hanap Trabaho" (transl. Job Hunting)	"Samantala"	July 15, 2024	16.0%	#1
368	32	"Madonna"	"Subukan"	July 16, 2024	15.9%	#1
369	33	"Burol" (transl. Wake)	"Nakapasa"	July 17, 2024	16.6%	#1
370	34	"Unang Paghaharap" (transl. First Meeting)	"Alas"	July 18, 2024	16.0%	#1
371	35	"Tutukan" (transl. Gunpoint)	"Tinutukan"	July 19, 2024	15.4%	#1
372	36	"Sumbong" (transl. Report)	"Armado"	July 22, 2024	15.9%	#1
373	37	"Pagdududa" (transl. Doubt)	"Nagkakaputukan"	July 23, 2024	17.3%	#1
374	38	"Takas" (transl. Escape)	"Bartolina"	July 24, 2024	15.3%	#1
375	39	"Malaya" (transl. Free)	"Magtiwala Kay Tanggol"	July 25, 2024	15.5%	#1
376	40	"Tulay" (transl. Bridge)	"Gibain"	July 26, 2024	14.7%	#2
377	41	"Himlayan" (transl. Cemetery)	"Ganti ni Mayor"	July 29, 2024	16.8%	#1
378	42	"Paalam" (transl. Farewell)	"Samantha"	July 30, 2024	16.8%	#1
379	43	"Burol" (transl. Wake)	"Paalam, Bubbles"	July 31, 2024	17.3%	#1
380	44	"Paghihiwalay" (transl. Separation)	"Hiwalay"	August 1, 2024	15.9%	#1
381	45	"Pagbawi" (transl. Retraction)	"Selyado"	August 2, 2024	15.7%	#1
382	46	"Pinapili" (transl. Choose)	"Salpukan"	August 5, 2024	16.4%	#1
383	47	"Pain" (transl. Lure)	"Buo"	August 6, 2024	16.5%	#1
384	48	"Paghaharap" (transl. Face Off)	"Babalikan"	August 7, 2024	16.7%	#1
385	49	"Mga Magulang ni Tanggol" (transl. Tanggol's Parents)	"Palitan"	August 8, 2024	17.9%	#1
386	50	"Pait ng Nakaraan" (transl. Bitterness of the Past)	"Ramon, Marites"	August 9, 2024	16.0%	#1
387	51	"Star of Venus"	"Star of Venus"	August 12, 2024	18.0%	#1
388	52	"Uwian" (transl. Going Home)	"Masamang Dugo"	August 13, 2024	16.9%	#1
389	53	"Binayaran" (transl. Paid)	"Suspetsa"	August 14, 2024	16.7%	#1
390	54	"Pagpaplano" (transl. Planning)	"Nasaan"	August 15, 2024	16.7%	#1
391	55	"Sugal" (transl. Gambling)	"Yayaman Na Tayo!"	August 16, 2024	16.8%	#1
392	56	"Pusoy" (transl. Poker)	"Pusoy"	August 19, 2024	18.2%	#1
393	57	"Pusta" (transl. Bet)	"Lucky 9"	August 20, 2024	17.4%	#1
394	58	"Tutol" (transl. Oppose)	"Imbitasyon"	August 21, 2024	18.0%	#1
395	59	"Bagong Negosyo" (transl. New Business)	"Boss"	August 22, 2024	17.7%	#1
396	60	"Camille"	"Camille"	August 23, 2024	15.9%	#1
397	61	"Lusob ni Lucio" (transl. Lucio's Raid)	"Ganti ni Lucio"	August 26, 2024	17.4%	#1
398	62	"Hideout"	"Puga"	August 27, 2024	16.4%	#1
399	63	"Pagyaman" (transl. Wealth)	"Simula"	August 28, 2024	16.5%	#1
400	64	"Bagong Bihis" (transl. New Clothes)	"Bagong Bahay"	August 29, 2024	17.0%	#1
401	65	"Hinala" (transl. Suspicion)	"Bagong Tanggol"	August 30, 2024	16.2%	#1
402	66	"Isla ni Divina" (transl. Divina's Island)	"Day Off"	September 2, 2024	17.9%	#1
403	67	"Ginto" (transl. Gold)	"Kilatisin"	September 3, 2024	16.3%	#1
404	68	"Ambisyon" (transl. Ambition)	"Malawak"	September 4, 2024	16.4%	#1
405	69	"Kumbinsi" (transl. Convinced)	"Alok"	September 5, 2024	16.7%	#1
406	70	"Ward"	"Kumusta Na"	September 6, 2024	15.8%	#1
407	71	"Bumabawi" (transl. Recovering)	"Bumabawi"	September 9, 2024	15.9%	#1
408	72	"Silaw ng Kayamanan" (transl. Glimmer of Wealth)	"Binubulag"	September 10, 2024	15.5%	#1
409	73	"Tutukan" (transl. Gunpoint)	"Mamili"	September 11, 2024	15.9%	#1
410	74	"Porsyento" (transl. Percent)	"Porsyento"	September 12, 2024	15.3%	#1
411	75	"Bintang" (transl. Accused)	"Kalakal"	September 13, 2024	16.0%	#1
412	76	"Kwadra" (transl. Quadrant)	"Binabantayan"	September 16, 2024	15.9%	#1
413	77	"Makatarungan" (transl. Fair)	"Buyer"	September 17, 2024	16.1%	#1
414	78	"Pagiiwan" (transl. Leaving Behind)	"Hindi Laging Tama"	September 18, 2024	14.6%	#1
415	79	"Palitan" (transl. Exchange)	"Di Na Kilala"	September 19, 2024	15.4%	#1
416	80	"Alanganin" (transl. Ambiguous)	"Set Up"	September 20, 2024	15.9%	#1
417	81	"May Pag-asa" (transl. There is Hope)	"Dagdag Yaman"	September 23, 2024	15.5%	#1
418	82	"Sorpresa" (transl. Surprise)	"Pinapatawag"	September 24, 2024	15.7%	#1
419	83	"Sugatang Don" (transl. Wounded Don)	"Lupa"	September 25, 2024	15.9%	#1
420	84	"Makasalanang Ginto" (transl. Sinful Gold)	"Totoong Ginto"	September 26, 2024	15.8%	#1
421	85	"Tunay na Ginto" (transl. Real Gold)	"Benta"	September 27, 2024	14.8%	#1
422	86	"Retrato" (transl. Portrait)	"Facundeng"	September 30, 2024	15.7%	#1
423	87	"Pinagtatakpan" (transl. Covered Up)	"Mukha"	October 1, 2024	14.6%	#1
424	88	"Ganti ng Caballero" (transl. Caballero's Revenge)	"Bayaran"	October 2, 2024	14.8%	#1
425	89	"Takas" (transl. Escape)	"Facundo"	October 3, 2024	15.7%	#1
426	90	"Ubusan ng Lahi" (transl. Run Out of Race)	"Caballero"	October 4, 2024	16.2%	#1
427	91	"Paglipol" (transl. Annihilation)	"Marcelo"	October 7, 2024	17.0%	#1
428	92	"Ang Tagapagmana" (transl. The Heir)	"Naiwan"	October 8, 2024	18.0%	#1
429	93	"Kamao Laban sa Kamao" (transl. Fist Against Fist)	"Mandirigma"	October 9, 2024	16.5%	#1
430	94	"Pag-Amin" (transl. Confession)	"Madonna"	October 10, 2024	15.9%	#1
431	95	"Boarder"	"Border"	October 11, 2024	12.8%	#1
432	96	"Pinalayas" (transl. Kicked Out)	"Alis"	October 14, 2024	15.2%	#1
433	97	"Lumipat" (transl. Move Over)	"Sinong Traydor"	October 15, 2024	15.5%	#1
434	98	"Kalas" (transl. Separated)	"Nabuwag"	October 16, 2024	13.8%	#1
435	99	"Mana" (transl. Inheritance)	"Buenas"	October 17, 2024	15.2%	#1
436	100	"Kapatawaran" (transl. Forgiveness)	"Pasugalan"	October 18, 2024	14.6%	#1
437	101	"Malas o Swerte" (transl. Unlucky or Fortunate)	"Sana Mapatawad"	October 21, 2024	16.0%	#1
438	102	"Paninisi" (transl. Blame)	"Panalo"	October 22, 2024	15.6%	#1
439	103	"Pag-angat at Pagwawaldas" (transl. Lifting and Dispersal)	"Kalabitin Mo"	October 23, 2024	15.0%	#1
440	104	"Selebrasyon" (transl. Celebration)	"Balik Quiapo"	October 24, 2024	15.2%	#1
441	105	"Pinunong Tanggol" (transl. Boss Tanggol)	"Bagong Boss"	October 25, 2024	15.1%	#1
442	106	"Pagbabalik sa Quiapo" (transl. Return to Quiapo)	"Bihira"	October 28, 2024	15.1%	#1
443	107	"Reunion"	"Ayuda"	October 29, 2024	15.7%	#1
444	108	"On the Job"	"Wag Maduwag"	October 30, 2024	14.3%	#1
445	109	"Takwil" (transl. Interpretation)	"Ikaw Ba"	October 31, 2024	15.3%	#1
446	110	"Carnappers"	"Dapat dina Bumalik"	November 1, 2024	12.2%	#1
447	111	"Tisay"	"Mapapalaban"	November 4, 2024	15.4%	#1
448	112	"Naisahan" (transl. Outsmarted)	"Pagpapalaki"	November 5, 2024	16.2%	#1
449	113	"Waldas" (transl. Wasting)	"Naisahan"	November 6, 2024	14.4%	#1
450	114	"Hostage"	"Papainan"	November 7, 2024	15.6%	#1
451	115	"Pagtakwil" (transl. Rejection)	"Hindi Papayag"	November 8, 2024	13.6%	#1
452	116	"Huramentado" (transl. Sworn)	"Pagwawala"	November 11, 2024	15.2%	#1
453	117	"Malalim na Sugat" (transl. Deep Wounds)	"Aabangan"	November 12, 2024	16.0%	#1
454	118	"Pinainan" (transl. Placed)	"Kumagat"	November 13, 2024	14.7%	#1
455	119	"Salubong" (transl. Welcome)	"Nakawala"	November 14, 2024	15.6%	#1
456	120	"Inosente" (transl. Innocent)	"Di Nasalba"	November 15, 2024	15.0%	#1
457	121	"Bitag sa Bitag" (transl. Trap to Trap)	"Isang Kondisyon"	November 18, 2024	16.2%	#1
458	122	"Sugod" (transl. Rush)	"Jackpot"	November 19, 2024	16.0%	#1
459	123	"Karamay" (transl. Sympathy)	"Huli Na"	November 20, 2024	15.1%	#1
460	124	"Isang Patibong" (transl. A Trap)	"Isang Bala, Isang Buhay"	November 21, 2024	13.6%	#1
461	125	"Matinding Habulan" (transl. Intense Chase)	"Matinding Habulan"	November 22, 2024	14.2%	#1
462	126	"Resbak" (transl. Revenge)	"Garahe"	November 25, 2024	16.0%	#1
463	127	"Sagip" (transl. Rescue)	"Itinadhana"	November 26, 2024	15.2%	#1
464	128	"Halik" (transl. Kiss)	"Puwang"	November 27, 2024	15.2%	#1
465	129	"Naiwang Kayamanan" (transl. Abandoned Treasures)	"Bilang"	November 28, 2024	15.1%	#1
466	130	"Noy"	"Takbo"	November 29, 2024	14.7%	#1
467	131	"Unang Biktima" (transl. First Victim)	"Maleta"	December 2, 2024	N/A	TBA
468	132	"Frenny"	"Noy"	December 3, 2024	N/A	TBA
469	133	"Checkpoint"	"Checkpoint"	December 4, 2024	N/A	TBA
470	134	"Katok" (transl. Knock)	"Hindi Iiwan"	December 5, 2024	N/A	TBA
471	135	"Lena"	"Lena"	December 6, 2024	14.2%	#1
472	136	"Lason" (transl. Poison)	"Lason"	December 9, 2024	15.8%	#1
473	137	"Panalo" (transl. Winning)	"Taya"	December 10, 2024	16.0%	#1
474	138	"Protektor" (transl. Protector)	"Pagkakamay"	December 11, 2024	14.0%	#1
475	139	"Negosasyon" (transl. Negotiation)	"Proteksyon"	December 12, 2024	N/A	TBA
476	140	"Alyansa" (transl. Alliance)	"Nagkasubuan"	December 13, 2024	13.0%	#1
477	141	"Masamang Balita" (transl. Bad News)	"Buhay ang Kapalit"	December 16, 2024	N/A	TBA
478	142	"Galit at Luksa" (transl. Anger and Grief)	"Ipon"	December 17, 2024	N/A	TBA
479	143	"Padre de Pamilya" (transl. Family Father)	"Padre de Pamilya"	December 18, 2024	N/A	TBA
480	144	"Hinanaing ni Santino" (transl. Santino's Complained)	"Kailangan"	December 19, 2024	N/A	TBA
481	145	"Pamilya" (transl. Family)	"Huling Moro-Moro"	December 20, 2024	N/A	TBA
482	146	"Hawak sa Leeg" (transl. Holding the Neck)	"Tinuldukan"	December 23, 2024	14.8%	#1
483	147	"Granada" (transl. Grenade)	"Tutuluyan"	December 24, 2024	12.0%	#1
484	148	"Sugod" (transl. Attack)	"Iparating kay Tanggol"	December 25, 2024	N/A	TBA
485	149	"Pagtatakwil" (transl. Rejection)	"Abot ng Tulong"	December 26, 2024	N/A	TBA
486	150	"Walang Ganting Pag-ibig" (transl. No Vengeance Love)	"Di mo Nakikita"	December 27, 2024	N/A	TBA
487	151	"Natitirang Labi" (transl. Remaining Corspe)	"Ipinagtabuyan"	December 30, 2024	N/A	TBA
488	152	"Katapusan ng Alyansa" (transl. End of the Alliance)	"Di Sapat"	December 31, 2024	N/A	TBA
489	153	"Poot ng Isang Ina" (transl. A Mother's Hatred)	"Tungkulin ng Ina"	January 1, 2025	12.0%	#1
490	154	"Tagong Paghihiganti" (transl. Secret Revenge)	"Iniwan"	January 2, 2025	N/A	TBA
491	155	"Huling Hantungan" (transl. Final Destination)	"Prosesyon"	January 3, 2025	N/A	TBA
492	156	"Tunay na Olga" (transl. Olga's True Color)	"Ikaw si Olga"	January 6, 2025	N/A	TBA
493	157	"Pain kay Tanggol" (transl. Captive for Tanggol)	"Nanay"	January 7, 2025	N/A	TBA
494	158	"Anak Ko 'Yan" (transl. That's My Son)	"Anak Ko 'Yan"	January 8, 2025	N/A	TBA
495	159	"Transaksyon" (transl. Transaction)	"Niloko"	January 9, 2025	N/A	TBA
496	160	"Ambush"	"Nararapat"	January 10, 2025	N/A	TBA
497	161	"Galit ni Tanggol" (transl. Tanggol's Anger)	"Ngitngit"	January 13, 2025	15.5%	#1
498	162	"Drive-by"	"Ratrat"	January 14, 2025	16.0%	#1
499	163	"Away Tropa" (transl. Clashed with the Friends)	"Walang Kakampi"	January 15, 2025	14.7%	#1
500	164	"Bisita" (transl. Visitor)	"Di Iiwan"	January 16, 2025	15.0%	#1
501	165	"Bumisita" (transl. Visited)	"Parating si Tanggol"	January 17, 2025	14.0%	#1
502	166	"Nagwala" (transl. Raged)	"Di Papaawat"	January 20, 2025	15.9%	#1
503	167	"Dakip" (transl. Catch Up)	"Inaabangan"	January 21, 2025	16.5%	#1
504	168	"Tapatan" (transl. Face Off)	"Paghaharap"	January 22, 2025	16.2%	#1
505	169	"Tunay na Ama" (transl. Real Father)	"Galit ng Puso"	January 23, 2025	16.6%	#1
506	170	"Kalimutan ang Pamilya" (transl. Forget the Family)	"Totoong Pagkatao"	January 24, 2025	16.5%	#1
507	171	"Dinisiplina" (transl. Disciplined)	"Koneksyon"	January 27, 2025	16.0%	#1
508	172	"Bagong Kalaban" (transl. New Enemy)	"Bagong Kalaban"	January 28, 2025	16.8%	#1
509	173	"Binubuong Pamilya" (transl. Family Formation)	"Bagong Transaksyon"	January 29, 2025	15.1%	#1
510	174	"Kapit sa Patalim" (transl. Hold on to the Knife)	"Impormasyon"	January 30, 2025	16.0%	#1
511	175	"Target"	"Paunahan"	January 31, 2025	15.0%	#1
512	176	"Serbisyo" (transl. Service)	"Maabutan"	February 3, 2025	15.8%	#1
513	177	"Wating"	"Wating"	February 4, 2025	15.7%	#1
514	178	"Kahon" (transl. Box)	"Kahon"	February 5, 2025	15.3%	#1
515	179	"Apat na Grupo" (transl. Four Groups)	"Bitag"	February 6, 2025	16.0%	#1
516	180	"Amanda"	"Ikaw o Ako"	February 7, 2025	14.9%	#1
517	181	"Primo at Amanda" (transl. Primo and Amanda)	"Primo"	February 10, 2025	17.5%	#1
518	182	"Harapan" (transl. Face to Face)	"Harapin"	February 11, 2025	16.5%	#1
519	183	"Bistado" (transl. Exposed)	"Hindi si Tanggol"	February 12, 2025	15.6%	#1
520	184	"Nasirang Pagpapanggap" (transl. Broken Pretense)	"Muhi"	February 13, 2025	16.4%	#1
521	185	"Tataya" (transl. Bet)	"Kapahamakan"	February 14, 2025	16.1%	#1
522	186	"Titulo" (transl. Ownership)	"Kapangalan"	February 17, 2025	N/A	TBA
523	187	"Tunay at Huwad" (transl. Real and Pretend)	"Titulo"	February 18, 2025	N/A	TBA
524	188	"Kalaguyo" (transl. Philanderer)	"Matinong Anak"	February 19, 2025	N/A	TBA
525	189	"Paniningil" (transl. Payback)	"Pekeng Tanggol"	February 20, 2025	N/A	TBA
526	190	"Mag-Ama" (transl. Father and Son)	"Mag-Ama"	February 21, 2025	N/A	TBA
527	191	"Arestado" (transl. Arrested)	"Hindi na Magkakalayo"	February 24, 2025	N/A	TBA
528	192	"Ginamot" (transl. Treated)	"Iniligtas"	February 25, 2025	N/A	TBA
529	193	"Anak" (transl. Son)	"Anak"	February 26, 2025	N/A	TBA
530	194	"Kasangga" (transl. Companion)	"Sabayan"	February 27, 2025	N/A	TBA
531	195	"Magulong Puso" (transl. Tangled Heart)	"Tunay na Anak"	February 28, 2025	N/A	TBA

=== Story Arc 3: Political Hegemony and Supremacy (2025–2026) ===
==== Chapter 6 ====
After being revealed his true identity, Tanggol decides to move in the Montenegro mansion and claim his right to the criminal empire. The Guerreros are the ruling political family in this new narrative, and delves into the clan’s oppressive grip on power, reflecting the nation’s ongoing struggle with political dynasties linked to social injustice and poverty.

No. overall	No. in chapter	Title	TV title	Original release date	AGB Nielsen Ratings (NUTAM People)	Timeslot rank
532	1	"Pagtitimbang" (transl. Weighing)	"Hindi Ipagpapalit"	March 3, 2025	N/A	TBA
533	2	"Walang Iwanan" (transl. No One Left Behind)	"Mayor"	March 4, 2025	17.6%	#1
534	3	"Mayor"	"Gitgitan"	March 5, 2025	N/A	TBA
535	4	"Gitgitan" (transl. Car Chase)	"Nanumbalik"	March 6, 2025	N/A	TBA
536	5	"Yakap" (transl. Hug)	"Pagdating"	March 7, 2025	15.8%	#1
537	6	"Laglag Wallet" (transl. Dropped Wallet)	"Lukso ng Dugo"	March 10, 2025	17.5%	#1
538	7	"Paalam" (transl. Farewell)	"Kuyog"	March 11, 2025	N/A	TBA
539	8	"Tinatanggap" (transl. Accepted)	"Salamat Anak"	March 12, 2025	N/A	TBA
540	9	"Imbitasyon" (transl. Invitation)	"Tinanggap"	March 13, 2025	N/A	TBA
541	10	"Sakripisyo ni Fatima" (transl. The Sacrifice of Fatima)	"Ipapakilala"	March 14, 2025	15.7%	#1
542	11	"Tapatan" (transl. Face Off)	"Lihis"	March 17, 2025	15.8%	#1
543	12	"Pagpapakilala" (transl. Introduction)	"Ipinapakilala"	March 18, 2025	16.0%	#1
544	13	"Pangako" (transl. Promise)	"Pamilya Montenegro"	March 19, 2025	14.8%	#1
545	14	"Ang Dalawang Angkan" (transl. The Two Clans)	"Miguelito"	March 20, 2025	15.9%	#1
546	15	"Ang Pambato ng Guerrero" (transl. The Pride of Guerrero)	"Ambisyon"	March 21, 2025	15.0%	#1
547	16	"Pamana" (transl. Heritage)	"Papa"	March 24, 2025	15.7%	#1
548	17	"Responsibilidad" (transl. Responsibility)	"Makikilala"	March 25, 2025	15.0%	#1
549	18	"Simbahan" (transl. Church)	"Pera at Kapangyarihan"	March 26, 2025	13.8%	#1
550	19	"Kaalyado" (transl. Ally)	"Presyuhan"	March 27, 2025	15.7%	#1
551	20	"Negosasyon" (transl. Negotiation)	"Diskarte"	March 28, 2025	13.4%	#1
552	21	"Mayora" (transl. Mayor)	"Para sa Pamilya"	March 31, 2025	15.8%	#1
553	22	"Bangungot ni Tindeng" (transl. Tindeng's Nightmare)	"Bangungot"	April 1, 2025	14.3%	#1
554	23	"Ang Pagkulong kay Marites" (transl. The Imprisonment of Marites)	"Pilak"	April 2, 2025	15.4%	#1
555	24	"Tunay na Halaga" (transl. True Value)	"Pustahan"	April 3, 2025	15.4%	#1
556	25	"Karera" (transl. Race)	"Karerista"	April 4, 2025	16.0%	#1
557	26	"Negosasyon" (transl. Negotiation)	"Ungusan"	April 7, 2025	N/A	TBA
558	27	"Plan C"	"Plan C"	April 8, 2025	N/A	TBA
559	28	"Tagumpay" (transl. Victory)	"Serbisyo"	April 9, 2025	N/A	TBA
560	29	"Dinakip" (transl. Captured)	"Galawan"	April 10, 2025	N/A	TBA
561	30	"Pasasalamat" (transl. Thanksgiving)	"Pinalayas"	April 11, 2025	N/A	TBA
562	31	"Galit" (transl. Anger)	"Masahol"	April 14, 2025	N/A	TBA
563	32	"Ang Akusado" (transl. The Accused)	"Parusa"	April 15, 2025	N/A	TBA
564	33	"Paayuda" (transl. Assistance)	"Tumulong"	April 16, 2025	N/A	TBA
565	34	"Ang Pera ni Tanggol" (transl. Tanggol's Money)	"Ipinapaabot"	April 21, 2025	N/A	TBA
566	35	"Bukas Kotse" (transl. Car Break-In)	"Sukol"	April 22, 2025	N/A	TBA
567	36	"Pagtakas" (transl. Escape)	"Patakbuhin"	April 23, 2025	N/A	TBA
568	37	"Bisita ng mga Benito" (transl. Visitor of the Benito)	"Walang Malay"	April 24, 2025	N/A	TBA
569	38	"Kidnap"	"Kidnapin"	April 25, 2025	N/A	TBA
570	39	"Galit ni Tindeng" (transl. Tindeng's Anger)	"Ipapatubos"	April 28, 2025	N/A	TBA
571	40	"Ransom"	"30 Milyon"	April 29, 2025	N/A	TBA
572	41	"Preso ng Benito" (transl. Prisoner of Benito)	"Magbantay"	April 30, 2025	N/A	TBA
573	42	"Mga Bagong Tahanan" (transl. New Homes)	"Binalaan"	May 1, 2025	N/A	TBA
574	43	"Ransom"	"Kaba"	May 2, 2025	N/A	TBA
575	44	"Tracker"	"Tracker"	May 5, 2025	N/A	TBA
576	45	"Survey"	"Tubusin"	May 6, 2025	N/A	TBA
577	46	"Family Reunion"	"Tinupad"	May 7, 2025	N/A	TBA
578	47	"Panganib kay Marites" (transl. Danger to Marites)	"Busilak"	May 8, 2025	N/A	TBA
579	48	"Ang Pagbabagong Buhay" (transl. The Change of Life)	"Gulo"	May 9, 2025	N/A	TBA
580	49	"Mga Pananabotahe" (transl. Acts of Sabotage)	"Babanggain"	May 12, 2025	N/A	TBA
581	50	"Kwon"	"Deal"	May 13, 2025	N/A	TBA
582	51	"Transaksyon sa Pier" (transl. Transaction at the Pier)	"Kargamento"	May 14, 2025	N/A	TBA
583	52	"Pagtatapos ng Alyansa" (transl. End of the Alliance)	"Ubusang Lahi"	May 15, 2025	N/A	TBA
584	53	"Salakay sa Pier" (transl. Attack at the Pier)	"Intersection"	May 16, 2025	N/A	TBA
585	54	"Pagbawi kay Marites" (transl. Taking back from Marites)	"Nawala"	May 19, 2025	N/A	TBA
586	55	"Pagpapaalis" (transl. Eviction)	"Putulin"	May 20, 2025	13.8%	#1
587	56	"Lipat-bakod" (transl. To Switch Sides)	"Katapatan"	May 21, 2025	N/A	TBA
588	57	"Ang Bise" (transl. The Vice)	"Pumapayag Ba"	May 22, 2025	N/A	TBA
589	58	"Ang Katahimikan ni Fatima" (transl. Fatima's Silence)	"Magdesisyon"	May 23, 2025	N/A	TBA
590	59	"Pulitika at Pamilya" (transl. Politics and Family)	"Pansariling Interes"	May 26, 2025	N/A	TBA
591	60	"Ang Manliligaw ni Fatima" (transl. Fatima's Suitor)	"Vice Mayor"	May 27, 2025	N/A	TBA
592	61	"Konsehales" (transl. Council Members)	"Mga Kakampi"	May 28, 2025	N/A	TBA
593	62	"Ang Congressman" (transl. The Congressman)	"Kakandidato"	May 29, 2025	N/A	TBA
594	63	"Totoong Kulay ng mga Guerrero" (transl. True Colors of the Guerrero)	"Pinapatawag"	May 30, 2025	N/A	TBA
595	64	"Pagtatagpo" (transl. Encounter)	"Konsehales"	June 2, 2025	N/A	TBA
596	65	"Ang Nakaraan ni Matilde" (transl. Matilde's Past)	"Nasusunog"	June 3, 2025	N/A	TBA
597	66	"Sumaklolo" (transl. To Rescue)	"Saklolo"	June 4, 2025	N/A	TBA
598	67	"Mayor"	"Tanggol for Mayor"	June 5, 2025	N/A	TBA
599	68	"Rigodon"	"Walang Puwang"	June 6, 2025	N/A	TBA
600	69	"Mga Tatakbong Mayor" (transl. Candidates for Mayor)	"Kinilala"	June 9, 2025	N/A	TBA
601	70	"Desisyon" (transl. Decision)	"Final Decision"	June 10, 2025	N/A	TBA
602	71	"Bagong Simula" (transl. New Beginning)	"Basbas"	June 11, 2025	N/A	TBA
603	72	"Sorpresa ni Olivia" (transl. Olivia's Surprise)	"Kandidatura"	June 12, 2025	N/A	TBA
604	73	"Talumpati" (transl. Speech)	"Bagsak"	June 13, 2025	N/A	TBA
605	74	"Kulong na Kandidato" (transl. Imprisoned Candidate)	"Ililigpit"	June 16, 2025	12.9%	#2
606	75	"Paniningil" (transl. Payback)	"Utos"	June 17, 2025	13.3%	#1
607	76	"Angkan Laban sa Angkan" (transl. Clan Against Clan)	"Kapatid"	June 18, 2025	13.3%	#1
608	77	"Kuya" (transl. Older Brother)	"Di Makakauwi"	June 19, 2025	14.0%	#1
609	78	"Motorcade"	"Kampanya"	June 20, 2025	13.2%	#1
610	79	"Magkapatid" (transl. Siblings)	"Magkadugo"	June 23, 2025	13.9%	#1
611	80	"Kapatawaran" (transl. Forgiveness)	"David"	June 24, 2025	14.0%	#1
612	81	"Dalamhati" (transl. Mourning)	"Hindi Nailigtas"	June 25, 2025	14.4%	#1
613	82	"Kabaong" (transl. Coffin)	"Pagluluksa"	June 26, 2025	14.5%	#1
614	83	"Burol" (transl. Wake)	"Burol"	June 27, 2025	13.2%	#1
615	84	"Mga Sikreto ng Guerrero" (transl. The Secrets of the Guerreros)	"Baho at Lihim"	June 30, 2025	14.2%	#1
616	85	"Kapatawaran" (transl. Forgiveness)	"Nakita Ko"	July 1, 2025	14.3%	#1
617	86	"Pamilyang Benito" (transl. The Benito Family)	"Benito"	July 2, 2025	14.0%	#1
618	87	"Para kay David" (transl. For David)	"Magtago"	July 3, 2025	14.2%	#1
619	88	"Tagalabas" (transl. Outsider)	"Tagalabas"	July 4, 2025	13.3%	#1
620	89	"Prusisyon kay David" (transl. Procession for David)	"Ibigay"	July 7, 2025	13.5%	#1
621	90	"Libing ni David" (transl. David's Burial)	"Libing"	July 8, 2025	13.7%	#1
622	91	"Ang Katotohanan" (transl. The Truth)	"Ang Magpapatunay"	July 9, 2025	12.8%	#1
623	92	"Mga Alas" (transl. The Aces)	"Gumanti"	July 10, 2025	13.0%	#1
624	93	"Miting de Avance"	"Bilang na Araw"	July 11, 2025	12.7%	#1
625	94	"Sagutan" (transl. Response)	"Banggain"	July 14, 2025	13.8%	#1
626	95	"Pagsiwalat ng Katotohanan" (transl. Revealing the Truth)	"Isiwalat"	July 15, 2025	14.3%	#1
627	96	"Pagsabog" (transl. Explosion)	"Bomba"	July 16, 2025	13.0%	#1
628	97	"Pagbagsak at Pagkakanulo" (transl. Downfall and Betrayal)	"Pagsisisi"	July 17, 2025	13.7%	#1
629	98	"Ang Katotohanan ni Tindeng" (transl. Tindeng's Truth)	"Tindeng"	July 18, 2025	13.0%	#1
630	99	"Dugo ng mga Guerrero" (transl. Blood of the Guerreros)	"Ari-Arian"	July 21, 2025	14.5%	#1
631	100	"Binhi ng Kalaban" (transl. Seed of the Enemy)	"Magbabayad"	July 22, 2025	14.3%	#1
632	101	"Magkakahiwalay na Guerrero" (transl. Separated Guerreros)	"Katauhan"	July 23, 2025	13.4%	#1
633	102	"Ang Laban ni Tanggol" (transl. The Battle of Tanggol)	"Panagutin"	July 24, 2025	14.2%	#1
634	103	"Galit ng Ina" (transl. A Mother's Anger)	"Dugong Guerrero"	July 25, 2025	11.3%	#2
635	104	"Palayasin si Marites" (transl. Evict Marites)	"Pipigilan"	July 28, 2025	11.7%	#2
636	105	"Titulo at Sementeryo" (transl. Title and Cemetery)	"Totoong Ama"	July 29, 2025	12.7%	#2
637	106	"Ang Pamana ni Gustavo" (transl. Gustavo's Inheritance)	"Kadugo Ninyo"	July 30, 2025	13.2%	#2
638	107	"Proteksyon ni Gustavo" (transl. Gustavo's Protection)	"Walang Gagalaw"	July 31, 2025	12.7%	#2
639	108	"Sasalubungin" (transl. Welcoming)	"Sasalubungin"	August 1, 2025	12.2%	#2
640	109	"Laban ni Santino" (transl. Santino's Fight)	"Iputok Mo"	August 4, 2025	12.6%	#1
641	110	"Ransom"	"Susi"	August 5, 2025	12.5%	#1
642	111	"Ang Utos ni Pilar" (transl. Pilar's Command)	"Kinuha"	August 6, 2025	13.1%	#1
643	112	"Ang Pagsasagip" (transl. The Rescue)	"Gagapangin"	August 7, 2025	13.2%	#1
644	113	"Ang Laban ng Mag-Ama" (transl. The Battle of Father and Son)	"Wag ang Anak ko"	August 8, 2025	11.6%	#2
645	114	"Ang Pagsagip kay Tindeng" (transl. The Rescue of Tindeng)	"Montenegro Ka"	August 11, 2025	12.7%	#1
646	115	"Kapatawaran at Suporta" (transl. Forgiveness and Support)	"Naniniwala"	August 12, 2025	12.2%	#2
647	116	"Nanay" (transl. Mother)	"Nay"	August 13, 2025	12.0%	#1
648	117	"Ang Ipinagmamalaki ni Marites" (transl. What Marites Prides On)	"Ibang Plano"	August 14, 2025	12.3%	#2
649	118	"Suwail" (transl. Disobedient)	"Makakabangga"	August 15, 2025	11.7%	#2
650	119	"Prayer Rally"	"Rally"	August 18, 2025	12.0%	#2
651	120	"Salpukan sa Prayer Rally" (transl. Clash at the Prayer Rally)	"Prayer Rally"	August 19, 2025	12.8%	#2
652	121	"Eleksyon" (transl. Election)	"Eleksyon"	August 20, 2025	12.0%	#2
653	122	"Gulo at Mga Sikreto" (transl. Chaos and Secrets)	"Mga Sikreto ng mga Guerrero"	August 21, 2025	13.2%	#1
654	123	"Tangka Bago Ang Bilangan" (transl. Attempt Before the Vote Count)	"Laging Handa"	August 22, 2025	12.7%	#1
655	124	"Patibong ni Angkong" (transl. Angkong's Trap)	"Damage Control"	August 25, 2025	12.1%	#2
656	125	"Pagsabog sa Tulay" (transl. Explosion on the Bridge)	"Salubungan"	August 26, 2025	12.8%	#1
657	126	"Galit ng Montenegro" (transl. Montenegro's Wrath)	"Resulta ng Eleksyon"	August 27, 2025	12.5%	#1
658	127	"Unang Bilang ng Boto" (transl. First Count of Votes)	"Nangunguna si Tanggol"	August 28, 2025	12.0%	#2
659	128	"Dayaan ng Boto" (transl. Vote Manipulation)	"Gapangin"	August 29, 2025	11.5%	#2
660	129	"Bilangan" (transl. Counting)	"Watingin"	September 1, 2025	12.7%	#1
661	130	"Harapan ng Mag-Ama" (transl. Father and Son's Confrontation)	"Itakwil"	September 2, 2025	12.0%	#2
662	131	"Ang Transaksyon ni Ramon" (transl. Ramon's Transaction)	"Nawating"	September 3, 2025	12.4%	#1
663	132	"Harapan ng Mag-Ama" (transl. Father and Son's Confrontation)	"Nag-Iisahan"	September 4, 2025	11.8%	#2
664	133	"Bunyag" (transl. Expose)	"Maskara"	September 5, 2025	11.2%	#2
665	134	"Lapastangan" (transl. Disrespectful)	"Taksil"	September 8, 2025	12.2%	#2
666	135	"Labanan ng Prinsipyo" (transl. Battle of Principle)	"Prinsipyo"	September 9, 2025	11.0%	#2
667	136	"Ang Nanalo" (transl. The Winner)	"Bagong Mayor"	September 10, 2025	11.8%	#2
668	137	"Paghahanda sa Matinding Salakay" (transl. Preparation for a Severe Attack)	"Maghanda"	September 11, 2025	11.9%	#2
669	138	"Pwersang Montenegro" (transl. Montenegro's Power)	"Pwersang Montenegro"	September 12, 2025	11.8%	#2
670	139	"Ang Bagong Salta" (transl. The Newcomer)	"Handa Na"	September 15, 2025	11.8%	#2
671	140	"Lulutuin" (transl. To Cook)	"Tutugisin"	September 16, 2025	12.7%	#2
672	141	"Salakay sa Montenegro" (transl. Attack on Montenegro)	"Digmaan"	September 17, 2025	12.3%	#2
673	142	"Tagumpay ni Rigor" (transl. Rigor's Victory)	"Paniningil"	September 18, 2025	12.6%	#1
674	143	"Pagbagsak ng mga Montenegro" (transl. The Fall of the Montenegros)	"Pagbagsak"	September 19, 2025	11.6%	#1
675	144	"Presscon"	"Di Susuko"	September 22, 2025	12.2%	#2
676	145	"Ang Liyab ng Pagkatalo" (transl. The Flame of Defeat)	"Ililigtas ko si Papa"	September 23, 2025	12.0%	#2
677	146	"Ang Pagsaklolo kay Ramon" (transl. The Rescue of Ramon)	"Babawiin"	September 24, 2025	11.6%	#2
678	147	"Ang Pagpuslit sa Ospital" (transl. The Sneaking Into the Hospital)	"Nakabantay"	September 25, 2025	13.0%	#2
679	148	"Isang Salita" (transl. One Word)	"Isang Salita"	September 26, 2025	12.3%	#2
680	149	"Oweng"	"Oweng"	September 29, 2025	11.8%	#2
681	150	"Ugat ng Korapsyon" (transl. Root of Corruption)	"Korapsyon"	September 30, 2025	11.7%	#2
682	151	"Panalo at Pagkabigo" (transl. Victory and Defeat)	"Mga Proyekto"	October 1, 2025	11.2%	#2
683	152	"Ang Pamamaalam" (transl. The Farewell)	"Paghihiwalay"	October 2, 2025	10.6%	#2
684	153	"Ang Pagtatraydor" (transl. The Betrayal)	"Palit Ulo"	October 3, 2025	10.2%	#2

==== Chapter 7 ====
After Tanggol’s contested defeat in the Manila mayoral elections, the Guerrero family strengthens its hold over the city. Now labeled as a high-profile fugitive, Tanggol rises as a symbol of resistance against corruption and injustice within the local government. Resolute in clearing his name, protecting his loved ones, and proving his innocence, he undertakes a series of dangerous missions that bring him into conflict with former allies and powerful enemies, as shifting alliances and rivalries redefine Manila’s political and criminal power structure.

No. overall	No. in chapter	Title	TV title	Original release date	AGB Nielsen Ratings (NUTAM People)	Timeslot rank
685	1	"Ang Panunumpa ng Bagong Mayor" (transl. The Oath of the New Mayor)	"Mayorya"	October 6, 2025	12.0%	#2
686	2	"Biktima ng Kahirapan" (transl. Victim of Poverty)	"Fatima"	October 7, 2025	11.8%	#2
687	3	"Bagong Kanlungan" (transl. New Shelter)	"Desperado"	October 8, 2025	11.2%	#2
688	4	"Ikot ng Kapalaran" (transl. Wheel of Fate)	"Ikot ng Kapalaran"	October 9, 2025	11.8%	#2
689	5	"Bagong Lugar, Bagong Mukha" (transl. New Place, New Face)	"Iisa-isahin"	October 10, 2025	10.1%	#2
690	6	"Rambulan sa Beerhouse" (transl. Brawl at the Beerhouse)	"Paghaharap ni Tanggol at Ponggay"	October 13, 2025	11.1%	#2
691	7	"Bagong Biktima" (transl. New Victim)	"Panganib"	October 14, 2025	12.3%	#2
692	8	"Paghahangad ng Kalayaan at Katotohanan" (transl. Pursuit of Freedom and Truth)	"Kailangan Buhayin"	October 15, 2025	10.6%	#2
693	9	"Pagbalik sa San Dimas" (transl. Return to San Dimas)	"Sandata"	October 16, 2025	11.7%	#2
694	10	"Lihim na Pagpupulong" (transl. Secret Meeting)	"Mata ng Taong Bayan"	October 17, 2025	10.4%	#2
695	11	"Paghabol sa Kidlat" (transl. Chasing Kidlat)	"Magsalita"	October 20, 2025	11.9%	#1
696	12	"Ang Desisyon ni Tanggol" (transl. Tanggol's Decision)	"Ani"	October 21, 2025	11.3%	#2
697	13	"Sariling Misyon" (transl. Own Mission)	"Hirap at Ginhawa"	October 22, 2025	11.6%	#2
698	14	"Rurok" (transl. Peak)	"Nandito na si Tanggol"	October 23, 2025	11.1%	#2
699	15	"Pangalawang Buhay ni Ramon" (transl. Ramon's Second Life)	"Pakiusap sa Diyos"	October 24, 2025	10.9%	#2
700	16	"Mag-Amang Montenegro" (transl. Montenegro Father and Son)	"Mag-Amang Montenegro"	October 27, 2025	11.7%	#2
701	17	"Layang Mag-Ama" (transl. Freed Father and Son)	"Babalikan Tayo"	October 28, 2025	10.7%	#2
702	18	"Bagong Biktima" (transl. New Victim)	"Pagbawi"	October 29, 2025	9.7%	#2
703	19	"Ang Paniningil" (transl. The Revenge)	"Mondragon Hotel"	October 30, 2025	11.5%	#2
704	20	"Kalayaan o Kabaliktaran" (transl. Freedom or the Opposite)	"Mystery Man"	October 31, 2025	10.8%	#2
705	21	"Pagtutuos" (transl. Reckoning)	"Ready to Rumble"	November 3, 2025	11.2%	#2
706	22	"Mukha ng Korapsyon" (transl. Face of Corruption)	"Sumusunod"	November 4, 2025	11.4%	#1
707	23	"Angkas" (transl. Ride)	"Anghel"	November 5, 2025	10.7%	#2
708	24	"Ang Anghel sa Shipyard" (transl. The Angel in the Shipyard)	"Sakay"	November 6, 2025	11.4%	#1
709	25	"Jacket"	"Intensyon"	November 7, 2025	10.4%	#2
710	26	"Payola"	"Pagkakakilala"	November 10, 2025	10.6%	#2
711	27	"Muling Pagkakakulong" (transl. Reincarceration)	"Tes"	November 11, 2025	10.9%	#2
712	28	"Para Kay Don Julio" (transl. For Don Julio)	"Sagip"	November 12, 2025	10.8%	#1
713	29	"Ang Pagtatambang" (transl. The Ambush)	"Harang"	November 13, 2025	11.2%	#2
714	30	"Expired"	"Takas Na"	November 14, 2025	10.5%	#2
715	31	"Alinlangan" (transl. Hesitation)	"Sisihan"	November 17, 2025	11.2%	#2
716	32	"Moralidad o Batas" (transl. Morality or Law)	"Isang Adhikain"	November 18, 2025	11.0%	#2
717	33	"Ang Misyon ni Ponggay" (transl. Ponggay's Mission)	"Pailalim"	November 19, 2025	10.6%	#2
718	34	"Nagdadalawang-isip" (transl. Second Thoughts)	"Paumanhin"	November 20, 2025	11.2%	#2
719	35	"Ang Kasunduan" (transl. The Agreement)	"Kasunduan"	November 21, 2025	11.2%	#1
720	36	"Ang Bangungot ni Ramon" (transl. Ramon’s Nightmare)	"Lulusob ng San Dimas"	November 24, 2025	10.7%	#2
721	37	"Undercover Pulis" (transl. Undercover Cop)	"Magpapakita"	November 25, 2025	11.5%	#2
722	38	"Patibong ni Rigor" (transl. Rigor’s Trap)	"Lulusob na Tayo"	November 26, 2025	10.8%	#2
723	39	"Tugisin" (transl. Hunted)	"Tugisin"	November 27, 2025	10.7%	#2
724	40	"Nasagip" (transl. Rescued)	"Ano ang Tama?"	November 28, 2025	11.5%	#1
725	41	"Suhol" (transl. Bribe)	"Makinig"	December 1, 2025	10.4%	#2
726	42	"Pulpol na Hepe" (transl. The Inept Chief)	"Makikita Mo"	December 2, 2025	11.3%	#2
727	43	"Ginulpi" (transl. Beaten Up)	"Tulungan"	December 3, 2025	11.8%	#1
728	44	"Lalaki sa Basurahan" (transl. Man in the Trash)	"Nasagip"	December 4, 2025	10.4%	#2
729	45	"Pagtitiwala at Pagdududa" (transl. Trust and Doubt)	"Pagkatiwalaan"	December 5, 2025	10.9%	#2
730	46	"Estrangherong Gising" (transl. Awakened Stranger)	"Huwag Matakot"	December 8, 2025	10.8%	#2
731	47	"Balat Tupa" (transl. Wolf in Sheep’s Clothing)	"Bernard Aguirre"	December 9, 2025	11.1%	#2
732	48	"Walang Preno" (transl. No Brakes)	"Preno"	December 10, 2025	11.4%	#1
733	49	"Bintang" (transl. Accusation)	"Kumapit Kayo"	December 11, 2025	10.8%	#1
734	50	"Marcing at Nita" (transl. Marcing and Nita)	"Mga Dimaculangan"	December 12, 2025	10.2%	#1
735	51	"Alfredo"	"Alfredo"	December 15, 2025	10.5%	#1
736	52	"Alas ni Mauro" (transl. Mauro’s Ace)	"Ebidensya"	December 16, 2025	10.8%	#1
737	53	"Mauro"	"Tondo Gang" (Note: The TV title for this day's episode is also known as "Tondo Boys", while most videos regarding the episode use the "Tondo Gang" tag.)	December 17, 2025	10.5%	#1
738	54	"Pagdadalamhati at Paghihiganti" (transl. Grief and Revenge)	"Natitirang Alas"	December 18, 2025	10.9%	#1
739	55	"Ang Pag-amin ni Lucio" (transl. Lucio’s Confession)	"Lucio Libiran"	December 19, 2025	10.0%	#1
740	56	"Pagsunod at Pagsugod" (transl. Following and Assault)	"Nakapasok na Sila"	December 22, 2025	10.3%	#1
741	57	"Pasabog" (transl. Explosion)	"Pasabog"	December 23, 2025	10.2%	#1
742	58	"Don Julio"	"Don Julio Montenegro"	December 24, 2025	9.6%	#1
743	59	"Peligro" (transl. Danger)	"Idol"	December 25, 2025	9.0%	#1
744	60	"Bagong Kakampi" (transl. New Ally)	"Safe"	December 26, 2025	10.6%	#1
745	61	"Expose"	"Safehouse"	December 29, 2025	9.9%	#1
746	62	"Pag-aabang" (transl. Waiting)	"Bawiin ang Lahat"	December 30, 2025	10.2%	#1
747	63	"Gustavo"	"Gustavo Guerrero"	December 31, 2025	8.2%	#1
748	64	"Galit ng Kapatid" (transl. Sibling’s Anger)	"Uubusin ko Kayo"	January 1, 2026	9.5%	#1
749	65	"Hinagpis ng Guerrero" (transl. Guerreros' Anguish)	"Hindi Kadugo"	January 2, 2026	5.6%	#2
750	66	"Iisa-Isahin" (transl. One by One)	"Simpatya"	January 5, 2026	6.4%	#2
751	67	"Gabi ng Panganib" (transl. Night of Danger)	"Kamatayan"	January 6, 2026	5.8%	#2
752	68	"Hesus Laban kay Kamatayan" (transl. Hesus Against Death)	"Anak ni Divina"	January 7, 2026	5.8%	#2
753	69	"Suspetsa" (transl. Suspicion)	"Walang Tiwala"	January 8, 2026	6.6%	#2
754	70	"Ang Bahay ni Divina" (transl. Divina’s House)	"Simulan ang Laban"	January 9, 2026	6.8%	#2
755	71	"Montenegro Mondragon Guerrero"	"Ako na ang Bahala"	January 12, 2026	6.9%	#2
756	72	"Mga Mondragon" (transl. The Mondragons)	"Mondragon"	January 13, 2026	7.4%	#2
757	73	"Anak ni Divina" (transl. Divina’s Son)	"Bernard"	January 14, 2026	6.0%	#2
758	74	"Midnight Monster"	"Torture"	January 15, 2026	6.9%	#2
759	75	"Rockyboy"	"Rockyboy"	January 16, 2026	6.4%	#2
760	76	"Sukol" (transl. Cornered)	"Protektahan si Tanggol"	January 19, 2026	8.9%	#2
761	77	"Victorino"	"Victorino"	January 20, 2026	9.5%	#1
762	78	"Dating Kakampi" (transl. Former Ally)	"Pinagtaksilan"	January 21, 2026	9.2%	#1
763	79	"Pagbagsak ng mga Guerrero" (transl. The Fall of the Guerreros)	"Loyalty Check"	January 22, 2026	9.7%	#2
764	80	"Pakiusap ng Isang Ina" (transl. A Mother’s Plea)	"Hindi Kalaban"	January 23, 2026	8.1%	#2
765	81	"Dahas at Suhol" (transl. Violence and Bribery)	"Dahas"	January 26, 2026	9.6%	#2
766	82	"Patawad o Patibong" (transl. Forgiveness or a Trap)	"Totoong Nanalo"	January 27, 2026	9.9%	#1
767	83	"Ang Magkapatid" (transl. The Siblings)	"Magkapatid"	January 28, 2026	8.6%	#2
768	84	"Pagmamahalang Magkapatid" (transl. Sibling Love)	"Santino"	January 29, 2026	9.0%	#2
769	85	"Santino"	"Tol"	January 30, 2026	8.7%	#2
770	86	"Pagluluksa" (transl. Mourning)	"Patawarin mo Ako"	February 2, 2026	8.8%	#2
771	87	"Tuloy ang Laban" (transl. The Fight Continues)	"Sino ang Magbabayad?"	February 3, 2026	9.1%	#1
772	88	"Hudas ng Quiapo" (transl. The Judas of Quiapo)	"Kabayaran"	February 4, 2026	9.3%	#2
773	89	"Maling Pinagkatiwalaan" (transl. Wrongly Trusted)	"Di Dapat Nagtiwala"	February 5, 2026	8.6%	#1
774	90	"Ben"	"Depensa"	February 6, 2026	8.7%	#1
775	91	"Kasalanan ng Ama" (transl. The Father's Fault)	"Pinatay ang Anak"	February 9, 2026	8.9%	#1
776	92	"Mag-ingat" (transl. Be Careful)	"Barikada"	February 10, 2026	9.1%	#2
777	93	"Sugod sa Burol" (transl. A Charge in the Burial)	"Ilabas si Tanggol"	February 11, 2026	9.3%	#2
778	94	"Panggugulo sa Burol" (transl. Chaos in the Burial)	"Tapos na ang Takot"	February 12, 2026	9.7%	#2
779	95	"Paghihiganti ni Rigor" (transl. Rigor's Revenge)	"Hinagpis ni Rigor"	February 13, 2026	8.6%	#2
780	96	"Kasinungalingan ng Kaibigan" (transl. A Friend's Lie)	"Mapalad na Kaibigan"	February 16, 2026	8.5%	#2
781	97	"Nakawan sa Binondo" (transl. Theft in Binondo)	"Bayad"	February 17, 2026	9.0%	#2
782	98	"Desisyon ng NEC" (transl. The NEC's Decision)	"Desisyon ng NEC"	February 18, 2026	8.4%	#2
783	99	"Kasiyahan" (transl. Happiness)	"Dahil sa mga Kaibigan Ko"	February 19, 2026	8.8%	#2
784	100	"Bitag ni Rigor" (transl. Rigor's Trap)	"Magkasala"	February 20, 2026	8.5%	#2
785	101	"Ang Pagtataksil" (transl. The Betrayal)	"Magkakapatid Hanggang Dulo"	February 23, 2026	9.6%	#2
786	102	"Hudas" (transl. Judas)	"Tropa"	February 24, 2026	9.2%	#2
787	103	"Tropa" (transl. Friend)	"Dolfo, Tanos, Bulldog"	February 25, 2026	9.7%	#2
788	104	"Ang Pagtataksil" (transl. The Betrayal)	"Bakit Enteng"	February 26, 2026	9.0%	#2
789	105	"Enteng"	"Enteng"	February 27, 2026	9.7%	#2
790	106	"Nasaan si Tanggol?" (transl. Where is Tanggol?)	"Nasaan si Tanggol?"	March 2, 2026	9.7%	#2
791	107	"Nazareno" (transl. Nazarene)	"Hihintayin Kita"	March 3, 2026	9.5%	#2
792	108	"Ang Pagbabalik ni Tanggol" (transl. Tanggol's Return)	"Tumindig Ka"	March 4, 2026	9.7%	#2
793	109	"Ang Rebolusyon" (transl. The Revolution)	"Silakbo ng Damdamin"	March 5, 2026	9.4%	#2
794	110	"Sugod sa City Hall" (transl. A Charge in the City Hall)	"Ramon Montenegro"	March 6, 2026	8.9%	#1
795	111	"Bagong Maynila" (transl. A New Manila)	"Mayor Tanggol"	March 9, 2026	9.8%	#1
796	112	"Bagong Simula" (transl. New Beginning)	"Magkakasubukan Na"	March 10, 2026	9.3%	#2
797	113	"Manila Warzone"	"Manila War Zone"	March 11, 2026	9.5%	#1
798	114	"Ang Huling Pagtutuos" (transl. The Final Reckoning)	"Madugong Laban"	March 12, 2026	9.2%	#2
799	115	"Ang Pagtatapos" (transl. The Ending)	"Ang Huling Laban"	March 13, 2026	10.2%	#1

== Notes ==
1. Story Arcs 1 and 2 is indicated as Season 1 and 2 on iWant.
2. Story Arcs 2 and 3 is indicated as Season 3 on iWant.
3. The following terms have been considered synonymous due to them being used interchangeably in translation for the Filipino word "yugto" by the sources provided above: Season, chapter, and "books".

== See also ==
- List of Batang Quiapo guest stars
