= Bassilyo =

Filipino rapper and actor

- Born: Lordivino Ignacio; December 11, 1977 (age 48); Marikina, Metro Manila, Philippines
- Genres: Pinoy hip hop
- Occupations: Rapper and actor
- Instrument: Vocals
- Years active: 1995–present
- Label: MCA Music
- Member of: Crazy as Pinoy

Lordivino Ignacio (born December 11, 1977), known professionally as Bassilyo, is a Filipino rapper, actor, singer and songwriter. The name Bassilyo is based on the character Basilio, from the novel Noli Me Tangere.

== Career ==
Bassilyo is a member of the Marikina-based hip-hop group Crazy as Pinoy, along with Crispin (Jeffrey Pilien) and Sisa (Muriel Anne Jamito). Their stage names are based on characters from José Rizal's 1887 novel Noli Me Tángere. In 2002, the trio, then known as Triangulo, won Rappublic of the Philippines, a contest for aspiring rappers on the variety show Eat Bulaga!. During their time at Eat Bulaga!, they were mentored by Francis Magalona.

Starting in 2012, Bassilyo competed in battle rap at the FlipTop Battle League, which he credits for his comeback. He then released his single "Lord, Patawad" (lit. 'Lord, Forgive Me') in 2013, which narrates past transgressions. According to Bassilyo, "about 90 percent [of the song] is based on [his] life". Bassilyo later admitted in an interview that he spent time in prison for undisclosed reasons, as well as having been addicted to gambling, both of which served as inspiration for the song.

Bassilyo appeared in the ABS-CBN game show Kapamilya Deal or No Deal in 2026 as part of the lucky stars. He was selected as a contestant on an episode airing May 2, winning ₱500,000 in the end. His episode re-ran on August 9.

== Discography ==
=== Studio albums ===
Discography
Year	Album	Label
2013	Klassik	UMG Philippines (then MCA Music)

=== Singles ===
Singles
Year	Song	Album
2013	"Lord Patawad"	Klassik
2014	"Walang Kwentang Kanta"	Klassik

== Appearances ==
=== Music videos ===
- "Ilusyon" (Abra feat. Arci Muñoz, 2013)
- "Nakakamiss" (Smugglaz, Curse One, Dello, 2014)

=== Television ===
Year	Program	Role
2013	Ihaw Na	Himself/Guest
2013	Wowowillie	Himself/Guest
2014	Umagang Kay Ganda	Himself/Guest
2014	Eat Bulaga!	Himself/Guest
2016–22	FPJ's Ang Probinsyano	Pat. Dante "Bulate" Villafuerte
2023	Magandang Buhay	Himself/Guest
2023–26	FPJ's Batang Quiapo	Teban
2025	Rainbow Rumble	Himself/Contestant
2026–present	Kapamilya, Deal or No Deal (season 6)	Himself/Contestant
2026–present	Sigabo	Ipe

== Awards and nominations ==
Award	Year	Work	Category	Result
Awit Awards	2017	"Taxi Driver"	Best Novelty Recording	Won
PMPC Star Awards for Music	2014	"Lord, Patawad"	Song of the Year	Nominated
PMPC Star Awards for Music	2014	Bassilyo	New Male Recording Artist of the Year	Nominated
PMPC Star Awards for Music	2014	Bassilyo	Rap Artist of the Year	Nominated
PMPC Star Awards for Music	2014	Klasik	Rap Album of the Year	Nominated
