= Batang Quiapo (TV series) =

Philippine television drama series

- Finale promotional poster with the "Ang Huling Laban ni Tanggol" tag
- Also known as: Gangs of Manila
- Genre: Crime drama; Action; Comedy
- Created by: Coco Martin
- Based on: Batang Quiapo by Pablo Santiago
- Developed by: Coco Martin
- Written by: Enrique S. Villasis; Lino Balmes; Miguel Legaspi; Airic Diestro; Cus Velasco
- Directed by: Malu L. Sevilla; Darnel Joy R. Villaflor; Richard V. Somes; Coco Martin; Kevin de Vela
- Creative director: Coco Martin
- Starring: Coco Martin
- Music by: Francis Concio
- Opening theme: "Batang Quiapo (Matira Matibay)" by Smugglaz, Bassilyo, Flict-G, Kial, MastaFeat, Jonas and Pistolero of FlipTop Battle League; (Note: Credits as per the show's closing credits) (2023–2024): "Batang Quiapo Dos (also known as Matira Matibay 2)" by Sisa, Smugglaz, Bassilyo, Flict-G, Kial, MastaFeat, Jonas and Pistolero of Crazy as Pinoy & FlipTop Battle League; (2024–2025): "Batang Quiapo 3 (also known as Matira Matibay 3)" by Sisa, Smugglaz, Bassilyo, Flict-G, Kial, MastaFeat and Jonas of Crazy as Pinoy & FlipTop Battle League; (2025): "Tagapag-Tanggol" 4 (also known as Matira Matibay 4)" by Bassilyo, Smugglaz, Flict-G, Sisa, Kial, MastaFeat and Jonas of Crazy as Pinoy & FlipTop Battle League; (2025): "Di Pa Tapos ang Laban" 5 (also known as Matira Matibay 5)" by Bassilyo, Smugglaz, Flict-G, Sisa, Kial, MastaFeat and Jonas of Crazy as Pinoy & FlipTop Battle League; (2025–2026)
- Country of origin: Philippines
- Original language: Filipino
- No. of seasons: 7
- No. of episodes: 799 (list of episodes)

Production
- Executive producers: Carlo Katigbak; Cory Vidanes; Laurenti Dyogi; Roldeo Endrinal (2023–2024)
- Producers: Coco Martin; Julia Montes; Eileen Angela T. Garcia; Lea A. Calmerin
- Production locations: Metro Manila; Pampanga
- Editors: Aries Pascual; Renewin Alano; Bernie Diasanta; Gerald Garcia; Edward Eugene Vagay; Hanie Uy; Ryan Bonifacio
- Running time: 22–35 minutes
- Production companies: CCM Film Productions; Dreamscape Entertainment; FPJ Productions; Regal Entertainment (Note: copyright holder only.)

Original release
- Network: Kapamilya Channel (Note: This series also airs on A2Z, Cine Mo!, TV5 (until January 1, 2026), and All TV (since January 2, 2026).)
- Release: February 13, 2023 – March 13, 2026

FPJ's Batang Quiapo (transl. FPJ's Quiapo kid / international title: Gangs of Manila) is a Philippine television drama action series airing on Kapamilya Channel. Based on the 1986 film of the same title, the series is directed by Malu L. Sevilla, Darnel Joy R. Villaflor, Richard V. Somes, Coco Martin and Kevin de Vela, it stars Martin in the title role. It premiered on February 13, 2023, on the network's Primetime Bida line up. The series concluded on March 13, 2026, with a total of 7 seasons and 799 episodes.

== Premise ==
A young man named Tanggol rises to be one of the biggest outlaws in the neighborhood while he navigates his way in life to survive in Quiapo, Manila. Hoping to earn the affection of his parents, his feat draws him closer to the truth about his identity.

== Cast and characters ==
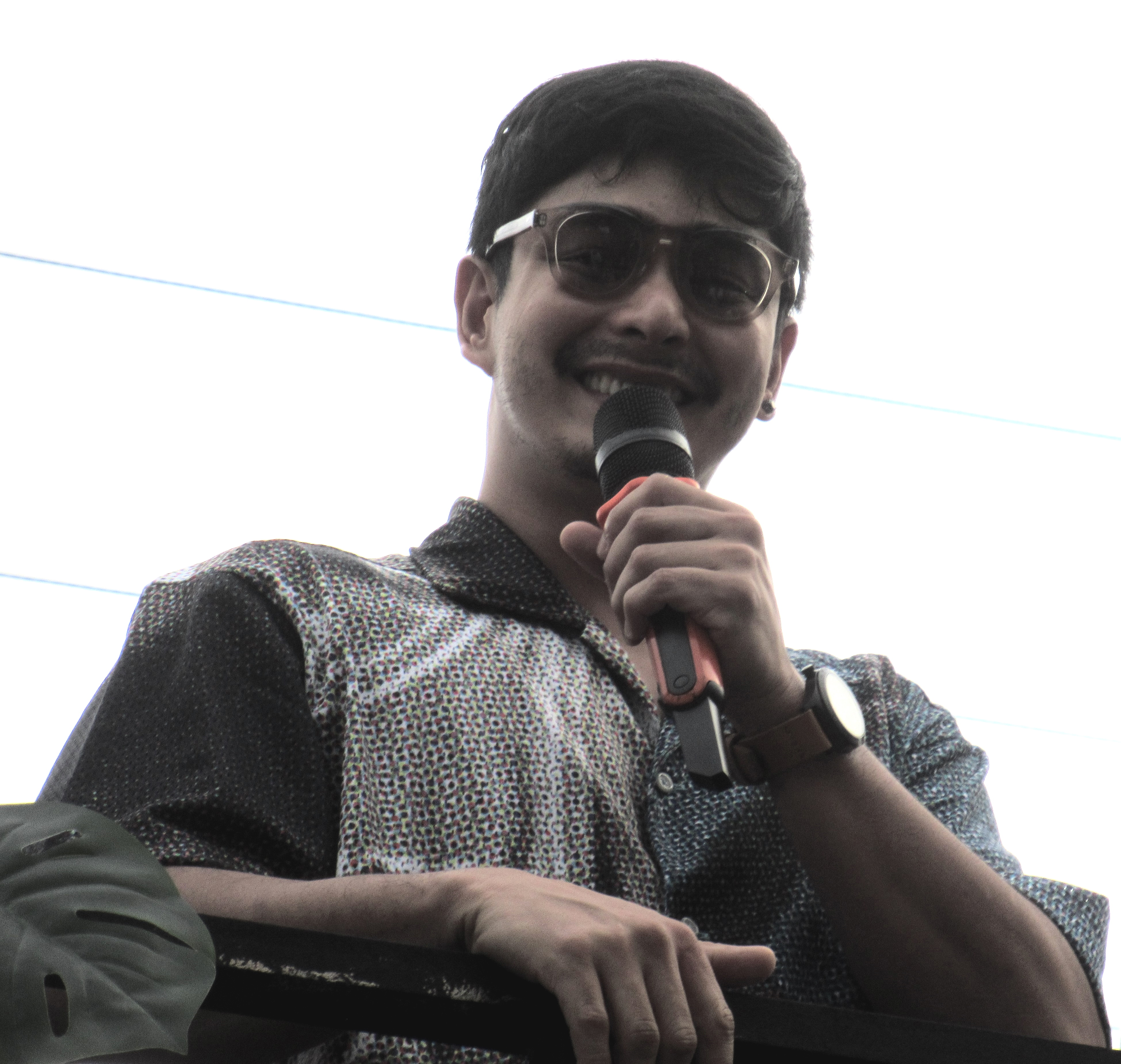
Coco Martin portrays Hesus Nazareno "Tanggol" Guerrero-Montenegro.

=== Final ===
Main cast

- Coco Martin as Mayor Hesus Nazareno "Tanggol" Guerrero-Montenegro (Note: formerly Hesus Nazareno "Tanggol" Dimaguiba)
  - Lawrence Dela Cruz as young Tanggol
- Christopher de Leon as Ramon Montenegro / Alberto E. Frias (Note: Ramon used an alias to win Mokang's heart and marry her, in order to hide his true identity as a drug lord.)
  - Coco Martin as young Ramon
- John Estrada as PCPT Rigor Dimaguiba (Note: The character's rank is based on R.A. No. 11200, the current law prescribing police ranks in the Philippines)
  - Ejay Falcon as young Rigor
- Cherry Pie Picache as Ma. Teresa "Marites" Asuncion/Guerrero-Dimaguiba
  - Miles Ocampo as young Marites
- Maris Racal as Pat. Paula "Ponggay" Garcia
- Jake Cuenca as Former Mayor Miguelito Guerrero
- Angel Aquino as Former Congresswoman Jackie Guerrero
- Albert Martinez as Former Vice Mayor Roberto Guerrero
- Charo Santos as Matilde "Tindeng" Asuncion
  - Precious Lara Quigaman as young Tindeng
    - Elisse Joson as younger Tindeng

Recurring cast

- Perla Bautista as Lola Florie
- Allan Paule as PLT Armando "Mando" Mendoza
  - Marlo Mortel as young Mando
- Joel Lamangan as Rodolfo "Roda" D. Alcantara
- Jojit Lorenzo as Renato "Enteng" Dimapilis
- Mark Anthony "Big Mak" Andaya as Alvin "Tanos" Garcia
- Sugar Ray "Mammoth" Estroso as Gabriel "Bulldog" Santiago
- Ryan Martin as Rodolfo "Dolfo" Agustin
- Via Antonio as Pat. Chona Vasquez
- Atong Redillas as Reporter Abet Capulong
- Loi "Mama Loi" Villarama as Loisa
- Francis Valle "Dyosa Pockoh" Suayan as Jessa
- Jegs Chinel as Patty
- Brenda Hernandez Lualhati as Lengleng
- Criza Taa as Dimples Sanchez
- Nicole Luna as Kitkat

=== Former ===
Main cast

- Lovi Poe as Monica "Mokang / Monique" Dimaculangan-Frias
  - Juharra Asayo as young Mokang
- Jaclyn Jose as Jail Chief Supt./BGEN Dolores Espinas
- Lorna Tolentino as Amanda Salonga
  - Lara Fortuna as young Amanda
- Lito Lapid as Supremo "Primo" Medina
  - Jomari Angeles as young Primo
- Celia Rodriguez as Doña Pilar Guerrero
  - Louise delos Reyes as young Pilar
- Michael de Mesa as Rafael "Paeng" Benito
- Andrea Brillantes as Fatima Benito
- Dante Rivero as Former Mayor Gustavo "Don Gustavo" Guerrero
  - Jhong Hilario as young Gustavo
- Roi Vinzon as Brando Mondragon
- Rosanna Roces as Divina Juanillo-Mondragon
- Baron Geisler as Rockyboy Mondragon / Bernard Aguirre (Note: Rockyboy used the alias to hide his true identity after recognizing Tanggol as the man who brutally beat him at the Mondragon Hotel, allowing him to get close, gain trust, and secretly plot revenge without exposing his murderous intent, masking it instead with apparent gratitude and generosity.)
- Aljur Abrenica as PLT Hector Victorino

Recurring cast

- Sarah Edwards as Fatima
- Rez Cortez as Abdul
- Aaron "Yorme" Sunga as Tolits
- Erin Espiritu as Tala
- Norvin Dela Peña as Norman
- Lovely Jimenez-Dela Peña as Joy
- RK Bagatsing as Greg Montenegro
- Elyson "Ghost Wrecker" Caranza as Kagawad / Tanod
- Eric Fructuoso as Banjo
- Janice Jurado as Janet
- Marina Benipayo as Catherine Cheng
- Odette Khan as Aurora Cheng
- Ynez Veneracion as Marita
- Dinky Doo Jr. as Boston
- Toni Fowler as Chicky
- Deborah Sun as Yolly
- Dindo Arroyo as Severino E. Sabado
- Val Iglesias as Romulo "Mulong" Cordero
- Robert Seña as Jail Warden Col. Gerardo Balatucan
- Vandolph Quizon as Ronaldo "Bong" Pulido
- Donna Cariaga as Becky
- Neil Coleta as Obet
- Yce Navarro as Ruben
- Elijah Canlas as Pablo Caballero
- Niño Muhlach as Baste
- Ivana Alawi as Samantha Montenegro-Macaraig / Samantha "Bubbles" F. Zaballa
  - Mona Alawi as young Bubbles
- Soliman Cruz as Celso "Mayor" Zaballa
  - Jim Pebanco as young Celso
- Jean Saburit as Lourdes
- Lito Camo as Goodah
- Nikko Natividad as Guillermo "Emong" Z. Aglipay
- Kim Rodriguez as Jelly
- Deo "Diwata" Balbuena as Frida
- Yukii Takahashi as Camille Castillo
- Levi Ignacio as Gregorio "Gary" Ramos
- Dan Alvaro as Dante "Dan" Martinez
- Joel Saracho as Apo Manuel
- Jerald Napoles as Ato
- Kim Molina as Ima
- John Rendez as Juancho Caballero
- Lao Rodriguez as Jail Lt. Antonio Macasantos
- Malou Crisologo as Pacing
- Gil "Ate Gay" Morales as Elsa
- Tessie Tomas as Doña Bettina Caballero
- Ara Davao as Katherine Caballero-Montenegro
- Jaime Fabregas as Don Facundo Caballero
- Nonie Buencamino as Marcelo Macaraig
  - Alex Medina as young Marcelo
- Luisito Espinosa as Roberto
- Renz Fernandez as Bullet
- Anjo Yllana as Michael
- Maverick Relova as Derek
- Barbie Imperial as Tisay
- William Martinez as Regie
- Raquel Villavicencio as Cecilia
- Lou Veloso as Ricardo "Noy" Panganiban Jr.
  - Karl Medina as young Noy
    - Yogo Singh as younger Noy
- Mercedes Cabral as PCpl. Lena Cortez
- Irma Adlawan as Olga Montenegro / Beng (Note: Olga's alias when she befriends Marites and her family to support them in the hardships of life, while at the same time taking revenge on Tanggol for murdering her son Greg.)
  - Ryza Cenon as young Olga
- Jeffrey Tam as Leroy "Roy" Tiu-Lee
- Ricardo Cepeda as Richardson Wu
- King Gutierrez as PLTCOL Manuel A. Suarez
- Joonee Gamboa as Harrison Co Cheng / Angkong
- Benzon Dalina as Turko
- Julio Diaz as PMGEN Augustus Pacheco
  - Dominic Roco as young Augustus
- Gio Alvarez as Kaloy Benito
- Angeli Khang as Veronica Kwon
- Leo Martinez as Arthur Kwon
- Long Mejia as Peng
- Chris Ulo as Reporter
- McCoy de Leon as David Guerrero-Dimaguiba / Fake Hesus Nazareno "Tanggol" Guerrero-Montenegro (Note: Olga blackmailed David into stealing Tanggol's identity, who eventually accepts due to his hatred towards his older half-brother. He introduced himself to Ramon as his biological son, and works with the Montenegros' drug cartel.)
- Joey Marquez as PMSg Edilberto "Berting" Oliva
- James Caraan as Larry "Badong" Lora
- Jon Achaval as Jaime Ferrer
- Gerard Pizarras as Joaquin Navarro
- Archie Adamos as Diosdado Ilagan
- Cholo Barretto as Enrico Gomez
- Diana Opilac as Nati Dumlao
- Ahl Opilac as Totoy Dumlao
- Ahldrin John Opilac as Lito Dumlao
- Shamaine Buencamino as Gracia Benito
- Albie Casiño as Iñigo Montenegro/Guerrero-Torres
- Efren Reyes Jr. as PLTCOL Salvador Romero
- Vangie Labalan as Carmen Pangan
- Ping Medina as Edwin Dimaculangan
- Raymond Ronquillo as Raul Ramos
- Kim Domingo as Madonna
- Ihman Esturco as Lorenzo Ejada
- Chanda Romero as Former Vice Mayor Olivia Montenegro/Guerrero-Torres
- Renz Joshua "Baby Giant" Baña as Rowell "Oweng" Bulawan
- Nonong Ballinan as Nognog Dumlao
- Vince Rillon as Mark "Maki" Benito
- Susan Africa as Nonita "Nita" Dimaculangan
- Pen Medina as Marciano "Marsing" Dimaculangan
- Juan Rodrigo as Alfredo Pangan
  - Joseph Marco as young Alfredo
- Aleck Bovick as Linda Sanchez
- Richard Quan as Pat. Mauro Garcia
- Art Acuña as Enrique Espineli
- Tommy Abuel as Don Julio Montenegro
  - Raul Montesa as young Don Julio
    - Arnold Reyes as younger Don Julio
- John Medina as Franco de Gallo
- Ronnie Lazaro as Lucio Libiran / Angkong Lucio
  - Viggo Franco as young Lucio
- Gillian Vicencio as Erika Guerrero
- Jay Gonzaga as Emil Alfaro
- Paolo Paraiso as Jason Medea
- Ronwaldo Martin as Santino Guerrero-Dimaguiba
- Mark Lapid as Benjamin "Ben" Camacho

== Episodes ==
| Story arc | Episodes | Originally released | |
| Story arc | Episodes | First released | Last released |
|---|---|---|---|
| 1 | 263 | February 13, 2023 | February 16, 2024 |
| 2 | 268 | February 19, 2024 | February 28, 2025 |
| 3 | 268 | March 3, 2025 | March 13, 2026 |

== Production ==
=== Development ===
After the success of the television adaptation of Ang Probinsyano, an adaptation of the 1986 film Batang Quiapo was named by various news outlets as the project most likely to be made next by actor-director Coco Martin. Rumors of the possible TV adaptation of Batang Quiapo began when the film's theme, Doon Lang, was performed by Martin in a "duet" with Fernando Poe Jr. as the clip of the scene from the film was being played; said scene originally featured Poe and Maricel Soriano singing in a duet. Martin had expressed interest in adapting more of FPJ's works for film and/or television, as he adapted another Poe classic Carlo J. Caparas' Ang Panday which was an entry into the 2017 Metro Manila Film Festival.

However, the adaptation became uncertain due to Ang Probinsyano's continued extension until its finale on August 12, 2022.

=== Casting ===
On December 5, 2022, Martin was confirmed to star, direct, write, and to co-produce (the first in his showbiz career) in the Batang Quiapo remake alongside Poe's daughter, Lovi Poe and Charo Santos.

McCoy de Leon's role as David was originally meant to only appear in the pilot episode of the show (Note: Sources have conflicting info until when he was supposed to appear, but as stated by Coco Martin himself, and was quoted directly from the latter source, he was only meant to appear in the pilot.) but was extended numerous times due to the team being impressed with his performance.

On January 4, 2024, Lovi Poe left the show due to her marriage with her fiancée in England.

On January 23, 2024, Deborah Sun left the show after being injured in an accident on set.

On March 2, 2024, Jaclyn Jose died, leaving her role as Jail Chief Supt./BGEN Dolores Espinas. Bart Guingona replaced Jose as the new Jail Chief Supt./BGEN Oscar Duran.

On February 10, 2025, Lito Lapid left the show as he ran for a senatorial position in the 2025 midterm elections.

=== Filming ===
Principal photography commenced on January 9, 2023, the same day of the celebration of the Feast of the Black Nazarene.

The Binondo–Intramuros Bridge and Candaba Viaduct of North Luzon Expressway (NLEX) served as one of the prominent locations featured multiple times in the show.

== Release ==
=== Broadcast ===
The series, along with other primetime programs were pre-empted on A2Z from November 8, 2023, to February 9, 2024, and took effect every Wednesday and Friday to give way to the 2023–24 PBA season. It continued to air on Cine Mo! (as Saturday Marathon), Kapamilya Channel and TV5.

On January 2, 2026, the last 50 episodes of the series (749–799) and other remaining newly released ABS-CBN programs on TV5 were transferred to AMBS' All TV. This occurred two years after a licensing agreement between AMBS and ABS-CBN was signed in April 2024 marking the latter's return to channels 2 and 16 in Mega Manila and regional channels previously held by ABS-CBN until 2020, and TV5 Network's decision to cease broadcasting new programs produced by ABS-CBN on TV5 due to financial disputes involving blocktime fees which was subsequently settled.

On February 20, 2026, lead actor and producer Coco Martin announced that the series would conclude on March 13, 2026.

=== International ===
On March 1, 2025, Batang Quiapo started airing internationally in 40 countries in Africa through StarTimes under the title, "Gangs of Manila".

=== Streaming ===
A re-cut limited series covering the first story arc was exclusively released on iWant from March 16, 2026, to March 20, 2026. Episodes were subsequently released on YouTube.

==== Re-runs ====
Individual TV episodes are also available for streaming on YouTube.

== Soundtrack ==
The series' opening theme song, "Batang Quiapo" (alternatively titled as "Matira Matibay" (Only the Strong Survive), is sung by various Filipino rap artists—Smugglaz, Bassilyo, CrazyMix, Flict-G, Kial, MastaFeat, Jonas, and Pistolero—and a cover of Rico J. Puno's "Kapalaran" (Fate) is sung by Gary Valenciano. "Pangako" (Promise) was originally sung by Moira Dela Torre.

== Controversies ==
=== Muslim stereotype controversy ===
A day after its debut, the show's creators apologized to the Muslim community due to a scene where Martin's character Tanggol sought the help of his Muslim friend Abdul–portrayed by Rez Cortez–as he was being pursued by the police. Tanggol took refuge in the company of armed Muslim men whom the police were hesitant to take action due to fear of retribution. A number of Muslim Filipinos took offense and criticised the portrayal as reinforcing negative stereotypes against them, with some calling for a boycott of the series. Movie and Television Review and Classification Board later released a statement on the controversy and asked for cultural sensitivity from production houses. Senator Robin Padilla–a prominent Filipino Muslim–also issued a statement regarding the episode, assuring people that Martin did not have any "ill intentions" and appealed to fellow Filipino Muslims for understanding and forgiveness.

=== Rendon Labador's criticism over disruption to Quiapo vendors ===
In March 2023, the show faced criticism from social media personality Rendon Labador over the alleged disruption of small businesses during the series' on-location filming in Quiapo, Manila. Labador alleged that the production disrupted local vendors’ business activities and negatively affected their sales, urging Martin and the production team to reconsider filming in the area or arrange an alternative that would minimize the impact on their livelihoods.

Labador subsequently reiterated his criticism on social media, arguing that the filming activities interfered with the livelihoods of local merchants. His comments generated mixed reactions online, with some supporting his concerns about small businesses and others questioning his criticism of the series.

In May 2023, Martin addressed the allegations, explaining that filming locations could attract visitors and become tourist attractions. He also said that the people in Quiapo were happy with the production's presence. Co-star Charo Santos-Concio similarly stated that the production respected the community and its residents. The cast's comments provided a contrasting perspective on the dispute over the series' filming activities and their alleged effects on local livelihoods.

=== Prison storyline changes and Lovi Poe's departure ===
In September 2023, the show featured a prison storyline in which Tanggol, became involved in the criminal activities taking place inside the fictional correctional facility. Under the influence of prison officials and criminal figures, he eventually accepted a mission to work as a hitman. The storyline expanded the series' portrayal of corruption, violence, and abuse of authority within the prison system.

The prison scenes attracted attention beyond the show's audience. In October 2023, the Bureau of Corrections (BuCor) raised concerns about the series' depiction of prison facilities and personnel. BuCor Deputy Director General for Administration Al I. Perreras sent a letter to ABS-CBN and the show's producers, expressing concern that the programme could mislead viewers about the agency and negatively affect the reputation of its employees and penitentiaries. Although the series used a fictional institutional name, BuCor argued that the depiction could be associated with the New Bilibid Prison.

Another widely discussed development involved the departure of Lovi Poe, who portrayed Mokang, Tanggol's childhood friend and romantic interest. In August 2023, Poe temporarily left the production to travel to Europe after becoming engaged to British film producer Monty Blencowe. Before her trip, she filmed scenes in advance so that Mokang could continue appearing in episodes during her absence. At that point, entertainment reports questioned whether she would return and how the production would handle her character's relationship with Tanggol.

Poe subsequently returned to filming before her character's storyline concluded. On January 4, 2024, Mokang sacrificed her life to protect Tanggol from a gunshot fired by Olga, portrayed by Irma Adlawan, during a confrontation involving Ramon, portrayed by Christopher de Leon. Her death marked the end of Poe's participation in the series. In her farewell message, Poe described leaving the programme as a difficult decision and expressed gratitude to the cast, crew, and production team.

The character's death prompted reactions on social media, as some viewers expressed disappointment with the sudden departure and questioned differences between the promotional trailer and the storyline shown in the series. These responses reflected concerns about the character's development and the series' creative direction, distinct from the separate concerns raised by BuCor regarding its portrayal of prisons.

=== Portrayal of violence against women ===
The show faced criticism from viewers for its repeated depictions of sexual assault and violence against female characters. Discussions on social media focused on the storylines involving Marites – portrayed by Cherry Pie Picache, Bubbles – portrayed by Ivana Alawi, Camille – portrayed by Yukii Takahashi, and Katherine – portrayed by Ara Davao, with some viewers expressing concern that sexual violence had become a recurring element in the show's treatment of women. Critics questioned the frequency of these storylines and the consequences faced by the perpetrators within the narrative.

=== Premature campaigning controversy ===
The show received criticism over a scene involving premature campaigning. Election lawyer Romulo Macalintal called on the Commission on Elections (COMELEC) to educate the show's producer, scriptwriter, and actors regarding election rules and the depiction of campaigning in the series. The criticism arose amid discussions about public understanding of the electoral process.

=== Rod Navarro Jr.'s allegations against the production ===
In February 2026, Batang Quiapo became the subject of controversy after actor Rod Navarro Jr., who appeared in the series in 2024, publicly alleged that Martin and members of the production team had mistreated him during filming. Navarro alleged that he had been subjected to verbal abuse and threats on the set.

The allegations prompted responses from entertainment personality Ogie Diaz and other individuals associated with the production, who defended Martin and disputed Navarro's account. Diaz stated that Martin had offered Navarro acting opportunities and financial assistance for a proposed business venture. Martin declined to directly address the controversy when questioned by reporters later that month.

== Reception ==
=== Ratings ===
According to Kantar Media, the pilot episode of the series debuted to a rating of 21.4%, and rose to 22.6% on February 15 (compared to its timeslot rival Maria Clara at Ibarra with 19.1% and 19.6%, respectively). Additionally, the series received an average national TV ratings of 25.2% from October 9 to 13, covering urban and rural homes (ahead its timeslot rival Maging Sino Ka Man).

Batang Quiapo ruled its timeslot for five consecutive months. Despite limited reach on free-to-air, AGB Nielsen Philippines reported that the pilot week of the series gave a positive feedback on the viewers with 12.5% pilot episode rating on February 13, 2023, placing it in the 3rd spot of the rating board and 13.8% rating on February 15, placing on the 2nd spot of the rating board (compared to Maria Clara at Ibarra's 12.5%). As per AGB Nielsen, the series registered its highest rating of 16.9% on October 13, 2023, placing at the top spot of the rating board.

The finale episode scored a 10.2% rating.

=== Online viewership ===
Batang Quiapo was a success upon its debut. The pilot week has generated over 44 million digital views across all online platforms and peaked with 341,509 live concurrent viewers on YouTube. The official tag also became the No. 1 trending topic on Twitter (now X) nationwide. On February 21, 2025, the series reached an all-time high of 1,004,554 live concurrent viewers on YouTube.

=== Parodies ===
A sketch in the children's comedy show Goin' Bulilit parodied the teleserye as "Baby Quiapo", where actor Renz Joshua "Baby Giant" Baña– "Sanggol Dimagiba-giba", a parody of show's protagonist Tanggol Dimaguiba.

A music parody of the first theme song of the show was released by Bhebheboyz titled "Batang Baho" (Smelly Kid).

== Accolades ==
Accolades received by FPJ's Batang Quiapo
| Award | Year | Category | Nominee(s) | Result | Ref. |
|---|---|---|---|---|---|
| Box Office Entertainment Awards | 2024 | Popular TV Program-Primetime Drama | Batang Quiapo | Won | |
| Platinum Stallion Media Awards | 2024 | Socially Relevant TV Series | Batang Quiapo | Won | |
| PMPC Star Awards for Television | 2025 | Best Primetime Drama Series | Batang Quiapo | Nominated | |
| PMPC Star Awards for Television | 2025 | Best Drama Actor | Coco Martin | Won | |
| PMPC Star Awards for Television | 2025 | Best Drama Supporting Actress | Cherry Pie Picache | Won | |
| PMPC Star Awards for Television | 2025 | Best Drama Supporting Actor | Christopher de Leon | Nominated | |
| PMPC Star Awards for Television | 2025 | Best Drama Supporting Actor | Joel Lamangan | Nominated | |
| PMPC Star Awards for Television | 2025 | Best Primetime Drama Series | Batang Quiapo | Won | |
| PMPC Star Awards for Television | 2025 | Best Drama Actor | Coco Martin | Nominated | |
| PMPC Star Awards for Television | 2025 | Best Drama Supporting Actor | Christopher de Leon | Nominated | |
| PMPC Star Awards for Television | 2025 | Best Drama Supporting Actor | Joel Lamangan | Nominated | |
| PMPC Star Awards for Television | 2025 | Best Drama Supporting Actor | John Estrada | Nominated | |
| PMPC Star Awards for Television | 2025 | Best Drama Supporting Actor | Elijah Canlas | Nominated | |
| PMPC Star Awards for Television | 2025 | Best Drama Supporting Actress | Cherry Pie Picache | Nominated | |
| PMPC Star Awards for Television | 2025 | Best New Female TV Personality | Ara Davao | Nominated | |

== See also ==
- Batang Quiapo
