= Crazy as Pinoy =

Filipino hip hop group

- Also known as: Traingulo
- Origin: Marikina, Philippines
- Genre: Hip hop
- Years active: 1990s–present
- Label: MCA Music, Inc.

Crazy as Pinoy is a Filipino hip hop group from Marikina, Philippines. Crazy as Pinoy was formed in the 1990s, and achieved mainstream success after the group became one of the finalists of Eat Bulaga!'s rap battle segment, Rappublic of the Philippines. The lineup consisted of the members and their alter egos loosely based on José Rizal's novel, Noli Me Tángere. Crazy as Pinoy released their self-titled album in 2014, spawning songs such as "Tayo Pa Kaya" and their Awit Award-winning song, "Di Sinasadya". The group was also part of the two volumes of Rappublic of the Philippines with the songs "Crazy Dance", "Huwad" and "Panaginip". They have cited influences from the late Francis Magalona who also acted as the group's mentor.

== Discography ==
- Crazy as Pinoy (2006)
