= Julia Montes filmography =

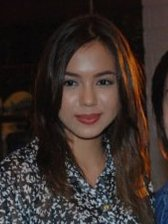
Montes in 2012

Julia Montes is a Filipino actress of German descent who made her acting debut on television in 2001 in the drama series Sana ay Ikaw na Nga. The following years she made her first appearance in the soap opera in Sana'y Wala Nang Wakas (2003), Hiram (2004) and went on to appear in the television kids gag show Goin' Bulilit as a series regular until her departure in 2008. She also made several guest appearances on television in the 2000s such as Ligaw na Bulaklak (2008), I Love Betty La Fea (2008), Nasaan Ka Maruja? (2009), Katorse (2010), and The Substitute Bride (2010). Among Montes' releases of 2007 were the dramas Paano Kita Iibigin and Bahay Kubo: A Pinoy Mano Po! with supporting roles. In 2008, she made a brief appearance as Anna in Chito S. Roño's drama Caregiver. A year later, she had a cameo appearance in the supernatural horror T2 and another supporting role in the horror film, Dalaw (2010).

Portraying different roles in the drama anthology series Maalaala Mo Kaya, Montes starred in ABS-CBN's reintroduction of the 1990s series Gimik 2010—before her breakthrough role as Clara del Valle in Emil Cruz, Jr.'s Mara Clara (2010–11). Her performance garnered critical acclaim and established herself as a leading actress in television. In 2011, she made her film debut with a leading role alongside Kathryn Bernardo in Way Back Home. Also in 2011, she played teenager Samantha "Tammy" Magtoto in Growing Up and started to appear in the anthology fantasy Wansapanataym. Montes played as Katerina Alcantara in the romantic drama Walang Hanggan (2012), in which she starred alongside Coco Martin. She garnered the Princess of Philippine Television Award from the GMMSF Box-Office Entertainment Awards for her role. That same year, she portrayed the character of Ligaya Bustamante in the romantic-comedy The Reunion, her highest-grossing release, and appeared as an aswang in the horror adventure The Strangers. The following year, she re-teamed with Coco Martin on the romantic drama A Moment in Time for which she received her first FAMAS Awards for Best Actress nomination.

In 2013 after a successful appearance in another Maalaala Mo Kaya episode, Montes starred opposite Enrique Gil and Enchong Dee as the long-lost daughter Sarah Beltran in the melodrama Muling Buksan Ang Puso. She played as a childhood friend and wife to Samuel Hidlago in the period drama Ikaw Lamang (2014) for which she earned her first Gawad Tanglaw Award for Best Actress and PMPC Star Award-nominated role. In 2015, Montes starred in the romantic horror Halik sa Hangin as the delusioned teenager Mia Generoso. She was praised for her performance and it earned her first Young Critics Circle Award for Best Performance nomination. She also appeared in Wansapanataym's "Yamishita's Treasures" alongside Coco Martin and in another Maalaala Mo Kaya episode. She then went on to play dual roles in Doble Kara (2015–17) as identical twin sisters Kara Dela Rosa and Sara Suarez, and appeared in the family drama Padre de Familia. Montes was awarded for another Gawad Tanglaw Award for Best Actress and the PMPC Star Award for Best Drama Actress nomination for the former.

== Film ==
Key
†	Denotes films that have not yet been released

Year	Title	Role	Ref(s)
2007	Paano Kita Iibigin	Lance's young sister	
2007	Bahay Kubo: A Pinoy Mano Po!	Young Lily	
2008	Caregiver	Gemma	
2009	T2	Rita's daughter (Cameo)	
2009	Dalaw	Mara	
2011	Way Back Home	Jessica "Jessie" Lorraine S. Santiago	
2012	The Reunion	Ligaya Bustamante	
2012	The Strangers	Pat	
2013	A Moment in Time	Jillian Linden	
2015	Halik sa Hangin	Mia Generoso	
2016	Padre de Familia	Pia Santiago	
2023	Topakk	Weng Diwata	
2023	Five Breakups and a Romance	Justine Ramos	
2024	Pula	Magda Faraon	
TBA	Doctors to the Barrio †	Ellen Peralta	

== Television ==
Key
†	Denotes shows that have not yet been aired

Julia Montes's television credits with year of release, title(s) and role
Year	Title	Role	Notes	Ref(s)
2001	Sana ay Ikaw na Nga	Danica		
2004	Hiram	Young Stephanie Borromeo		
2005	Goin' Bulilit	Various roles		
2008	Ligaw na Bulaklak	Young Jennifer		
2008	Maalaala Mo Kaya	Abby	Episode: "Card"	
2008	Maalaala Mo Kaya	Ricardo's sister	Episode: "Leather Shoes"	
2008	I Love Betty La Fea	Young Daniella Valencia		
2009	Maalaala Mo Kaya	Young Babette	Episode: "Diary"	
2009	Maalaala Mo Kaya	Jerome's sister	Episode: "Lubid"	
2009	Komiks Presents: Nasaan Ka Maruja?	Maura		
2009	New Pangarap Kong Jackpot	Janet		
2010	Katorse	Nellie		
2010	Precious Hearts Romances Presents	Young Wilda Abrantes	Episode: "The Substitute Bride"	
2010	Your Song Presents: Gimik 2010	Mara		
2010	Mara Clara	Clara del Valle / Clara David		
2010	Shoutout!	Herself		
2011	Wansapanataym	Star	Episode: "Unli-Gift Box"	
2011	Growing Up	Samantha "Tammy" Magtoto		
2012	Walang Hanggan	Katerina Alcantara-Guidotti†		
2013	Maalaala Mo Kaya	Diana	Episode: "Krus"	
2013	Muling Buksan ang Puso	Sarah Beltran-Dela Vega / Sarah B. Salazar-Dela Vega / Sarah B. Dela Vega		
2014	Wansapanataym	Marian Jacinto	Episode: "The Christmas Visitor"	
2014	Wansapanataym	Trina	Episode: "Three-In-One"	
2014	Ikaw Lamang	Monalisa "Mona" Roque-Hidalgo		
2015	Wansapanataym	Tanya	Episode: "Yamashita's Treasures"	
2015	Doble Kara	Kara S. Dela Rosa-Acosta / Sara H. Suarez / Sara Dela Rosa-Ligaya		
2015	Maalaala Mo Kaya	Rosa	Episode: "Picture"	
2017	Wansapanataym	Annika de Cuadra	Episode: "Annika Pintasera"	
2018	Asintado	Juliana Ramirez / Juliana "Ana" Dimasalang-Del Mundo / Stella Dela Torre-Guerrero		
2020	24/7	Mia Agbayani		
2021–2022	FPJ's Ang Probinsyano	Maria Isabel Guillermo Hidalgo / Mara Silang / Mara Guillermo Hidalgo		
2023-2026	FPJ's Batang Quiapo	—N/a	Producer only	
2024–2025	Saving Grace	Anna Grace Sarmiento		
2026- present	Sigabo	Samantha "Sam" Jacinto/ Gloria Magtibay	Main role; also producer	

== See also ==
- List of awards and nominations received by Julia Montes
