= List of awards and nominations received by Julia Montes =

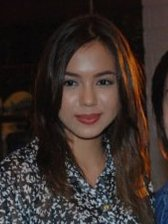
Montes in 2012

Julia Montes is a Filipino actress and model who has received various accolades for her work in film and television which span 20 years. Among them include a FAMAS Award, two Gawad Tanglaw, a PMPC Star Awards for Movies and a Box Office Entertainment Award, including nominations from PMPC Star Awards for Television and Young Critics Circle. She began her career as a child actress and became a mainstay cast in the sketch comedy series Goin' Bulilit in 2005. Her breakthrough came when she portrayed Clara in the remake Mara Clara (2010). The following year, she made her film debut in the family drama Way Back Home with co-star Kathryn Bernardo.

In 2012, Montes was named the "Princess of Philippine Television" at the Box Office Entertainment Awards for the romantic drama Walang Hanggan. She earned her first FAMAS Award for Best Actress nomination in 2014 for her role in the romantic drama A Moment in Time. In 2015, she won the Gawad Tanglaw for Best Performance by an Actress for her role in the period drama Ikaw Lamang. The same year, she received her first Young Critics Circle nomination for her role in the romantic horror Halik sa Hangin. In 2016, she won her second Gawad Tanglaw for her portrayal in the melodrama Doble Kara, including a nomination for a PMPC Star Awards for Television.

== Awards and nominations ==
Awards and nominations received by Julia Montes
Award (Note: Awards, festivals, honors and other miscellaneous organizations are listed in alphabetical order.)	Year (Note: Indicates the year of ceremony. Each year is linked to the article about the awards held that year, wherever possible.)	Nominated work	Category	Result	Ref.
Anak TV Seal Awards	2016	Julia Montes	Makabata Stars	Won	
Anak TV Seal Awards	2017	Julia Montes	Makabata Stars	Won	
ASAP Pop Viewers Choice Awards	2011	Mara Clara	Pop Teleserye Character	Nominated	
ASAP Pop Viewers Choice Awards	2011	Growing Up	Tween Popsies (Note: (with Diego Loyzaga))	Nominated	
Box Office Entertainment Awards	2013	Walang Hanggan	Princess of Philippine Television	Won	
Candy Style Awards	2012	Julia Montes	Most Stylish BFF (Note: with Kathryn Bernardo)	Won	
EdukCircle Awards	2017	Doble Kara	Best Actress in a TV series	Nominated	
FMTM Awards	2012	Walang Hanggan	Hottest Trending Female Star	1st	
FMTM Awards	2012	Walang Hanggan	Most Favorite Actress	1st	
FMTM Awards	2012	Walang Hanggan	Most Favorite Loveteam (Note: with Coco Martin)	2nd	
FMTM Awards	2012	Walang Hanggan	Most Improved Actress	1st	
FAMAS Awards	2011	Julia Montes	German Moreno Youth Achievement Award	Won	
FAMAS Awards	2014	A Moment in Time	Best Actress	Nominated	
FAMAS Awards	2025	Topakk	Best Actress	Nominated	
Gawad Lasallianeta Awards	2023	Five Breakups and a Romance	Most Outstanding Film Actress	Nominated	
Gawad Tanglaw Awards	2015	Ikaw Lamang	Best Performance by an Actress (Note: (tied with Angel Locsin))	Won	
Gawad Tanglaw Awards	2016	Doble Kara	Best Performance by an Actress	Won	
Golden Screen TV Awards	2012	Mara Clara	Outstanding Breakthrough Performance by an Actress	Won	
Kakulay Teen Choice Awards	2012	Walang Hanggan	Primetime Queen of the Year	Won	
Kakulay Teen Choice Awards	2013	Julia Montes	Hottest Film Star	Won	
KBP Golden Dove Awards	2026	Saving Grace	Best Actress	Won	
Metro Manila Film Festival	2024	Topakk	Best Actress	Nominated	
PEPsters Choice Awards	2013	Julia Montes	Female Teen Star of the Year	Nominated	
PEPsters Choice Awards	2014	Julia Montes	Female Teen Star of the Year	Nominated	
PMPC Star Awards for Movies	2024	Five Breakups and a Romance	Movie Loveteam of the Year (Note: with Alden Richards)	Won	
PMPC Star Awards for Movies	2024	Five Breakups and a Romance	Movie Ensemble Acting of the Year	Nominated	
PMPC Star Awards for Movies	2025	Topakk	Movie Ensemble Acting of the Year	Nominated	
PMPC Star Awards for Television	2014	Ikaw Lamang	Best Drama Supporting Actress	Nominated	
PMPC Star Awards for Television	2016	Doble Kara	Best Drama Actress	Nominated	
PMPC Star Awards for Television	2018	Asintado	Best Drama Actress	Nominated	
PUSH Awards	2015	Julia Montes	Most Loved Female Celebrity	Nominated	
The EDDYs	2024	Five Breakups and a Romance	Box Office Heroes	Won	
The EDDYs	2024	Five Breakups and a Romance	Best Actress	Won	
TV Series Craze Awards	2013	Muling Buksan Ang Puso	Hottest Love Team of the Year (Note: (with Enrique Gil))	Won	
TV Series Craze Awards	2016	Julia Montes	Leading Lady of the Year	Won	
Us Girls Awards	2011	Julia Montes	Face Girl of the Year	Won	
VP Choice Awards	2024	Five Breakups and a Romance	Movie Actress of the Year	Nominated	
Yahoo!'s OMG! Awards	2011	Julia Montes	Awesome Young Actress	Nominated	
Young Critics Circle	2016	Halik sa Hangin	Best Performance	Nominated	

== Other accolades ==
=== Listicles ===
Key
‡	Indicates an accolade Julia Montes was the only winner

Publisher	Year	Category	Placement	Ref.
FHM Philippines	2012	Philippines Sexiest Women	68th	
FHM Philippines	2013	Philippines Sexiest Women	57th	
FHM Philippines	2014	Philippines Sexiest Women	73rd	
FHM Philippines	2015	Philippines Sexiest Women	70th	
FHM Philippines	2016	Philippines Sexiest Women	56th	
FHM Philippines	2017	Philippines Sexiest Women	51st	
PEP Magazine	2012	Most Liked Philippine Actress	8th	
Star Magic	2012	Sweetheart of the Night	Won	
Star Magic	2013	Best Dressed	Shortlisted	
Star Magic	2014	Female Star of the Night	Won	
Yes! Magazine	2011	100 Most Beautiful Star Newbie Category	Placed	
Yes! Magazine	2012	100 Most Beautiful Stars Breakthrough Category	Placed	
Yes! Magazine	2012	Top 20 Most Influential Celebrity Netizen	4th	
Yes! Magazine	2013	100 Most Beautiful Stars	Placed	
Yes! Magazine	2014	100 Most Beautiful Stars Primetime Big Hitters Category	Placed	
Yes! Magazine	2015	100 Most Beautiful Stars	Placed	
Yes! Magazine	2016	100 Most Beautiful Stars	Placed	
Yes! Magazine	2017	100 Most Beautiful Stars	Placed	
