= List of 24/7 episodes =

24/7 is a Philippine action drama television series starring Julia Montes, Arjo Atayde, Melissa Ricks, Joem Bascon, Joross Gamboa, Denise Laurel and JC Santos. The series premiered on ABS-CBN's Yes Weekend! Sunday block and worldwide via The Filipino Channel on February 23, 2020, replacing The Haunted.

== Series overview ==
Season	Episodes	Originally released	
Season	Episodes	First released	Last released
1	4	February 23, 2020	March 15, 2020

== Episodes ==
=== Season 1 ===
No. overall	No. in season	Title	Original release date	Prod. code	Kantar Media Ratings (nationwide)	AGB Nielsen (NUTAM People)
1	1	"Season Premiere"	February 23, 2020	247 - 1001	27.0%	12.4%
2	2	"Tadhana"	March 1, 2020	247 - 1002	27.1%	12.1%
3	3	"Outbreak"	March 8, 2020	247 - 1003	24.1%	10.8%
4	4	"Virus"	March 15, 2020	247 - 1004	27.7%	14.2%
