= A Moment in Time (film) =

2013 film

- Theatrical release poster
- Directed by: Emmanuel Quindo Palo
- Screenplay by: Rondel Lindayag
- Story by: Rondel Lindayag; Rodel Nacianceno; Mari Lamasan
- Produced by: Roldeo T. Endrinal
- Starring: Coco Martin; Julia Montes
- Cinematography: Mo Zee; Jay Abello
- Edited by: Tara Illenberger
- Music by: Jessie Lasaten
- Production companies: Star Cinema; Dreamscape Cinema
- Distributed by: Star Cinema
- Release date: February 13, 2013
- Country: Philippines
- Languages: Filipino; English; Dutch
- Box office: ₱64 million

A Moment in Time is a 2013 Filipino romantic drama film directed by Emmanuel Quindo Palo and starring Coco Martin and Julia Montes. The film was shot in Amsterdam and other cities such as Paris. The film was produced by Dreamscape Cinema and Star Cinema and released February 13, 2013.

This marks Coco Martin and Julia Montes' first film together after their TV series Walang Hanggan.

== Plot ==
Patrick (Coco Martin) is a part-time waiter and self-employed artist. He meets Jillian (Julia Montes) on a subway and the two fall in love. Patrick later discovers Jillian's past and has a hard time accepting her truth. He starts to make her suffer by pretending that he really loves her. What will happen when Jillian moves? And what will happen when Patrick comes back to apologize?

== Cast ==
- Julia Montes as Jillian Linden
- Coco Martin as Patrick Javier
- Cherie Gil as Karen Linden
- Gabby Concepcion as Steve Linden
- Zsa Zsa Padilla as Miriam Javier
- Ella Cruz as Mai-mai Javier
- Joseph Marco as Morie
- Manuel Chua as Bodjie
- Joj Agpangan as Chummy
- Jai Agpangan as Yummy
- Ivan Dorschner as Brix
- Erin Ocampo as Bianca
- PJ Endrinal as Christian
- Malou Crisologo as Mayordoma
- Jong Cuenco as Orchestra Conductor

== Production ==
=== Location ===
The film was shot while their TV series Walang Hanggan is still airing. It was shot in Amsterdam and other cities like Paris. Some scenes were taken in Manila.

=== Music ===
Erik Santos recorded a cover of "You Are My Song" originally sung by Martin Nievera and Regine Velasquez-Alcasid, was used as the film's theme song.

== Reception ==
=== Rating ===
The film was graded "B" by the Cinema Evaluation Board and received a "GP" rating from the MTRCB.

=== Box office ===
On its opening week, the film opened at number two at the Philippine box office, grossing over ₱34.8 million behind the Hollywood action flick A Good Day to Die Hard which opened the same week and grossed over ₱45.3 million. The film was a box office success, grossing ₱64,543,391.00 in its four weeks run in the theaters.

=== Television premiere ===
The film had its television premiere on December 15, 2013 in the cable channel Cinema One.

=== Accolades ===
Association	Category	Recipient(s) and nominee(s)	Result	Ref.
62nd FAMAS Awards	Best Actor	Coco Martin	Nominated	
62nd FAMAS Awards	Best Actress	Julia Montes	Nominated	
62nd FAMAS Awards	Best Supporting Actress	Cherie Gil	Nominated	
