= Julia Montes =

Filipino actress (born 1995)

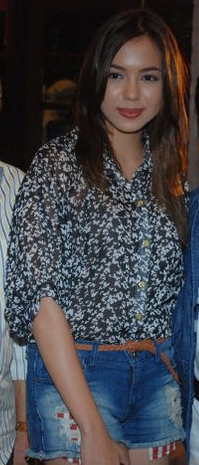
- Montes in 2012
- Born: Mara Hautea Schnittka; March 19, 1995 (age 31); Pandacan, Manila, Philippines
- Other names: Mara Schnittka; Mara Montes
- Education: Center for Culinary Arts, Manila
- Occupations: Actress; producer
- Years active: 2001–present
- Agents: Star Magic (2003–2016) Cornerstone Entertainment; (2016–present)
- Partner: Coco Martin (2011–present)
- Awards: Full list

Mara Hautea Schnittka (/ˈmɑːrə haʊˈteɪə ˈʃnɪtkə/ MAR-ə how-TAY-ə SHNIT-kə; born March 19, 1995), known professionally as Julia Montes (Tagalog: [ˈdʒulja mɔnˈtɛs]), is a Filipino actress. Known for playing strong female characters and romantic leads in a range of genres across film and television, she has received various accolades, including a FAMAS Award, two Gawad Tanglaw Awards, a PMPC Star Awards for Movies and a Box Office Entertainment Award. Yes! magazine named her one of the most influential celebrities in Philippine entertainment.

Montes made her screen debut on GMA Network's Sana ay Ikaw na Nga (2001) as a child actress and appeared in several television commercials. After her transfer in ABS-CBN, she initially played young versions of characters in several television series such as Hiram (2004), Ligaw Na Bulaklak (2008), I Love Betty La Fea (2008) and eventually became part of the gag show, Goin' Bulilit (2005–08). She spent the next few years playing supporting roles in various anthology shows and finally gained widespread recognition as Clara del Valle in the remake of Mara Clara (2010–11). It was followed by the teen drama series, Growing Up (2011).

Montes rose to stardom after being paired with Coco Martin in the series Walang Hanggan (2012), as Katerina Alcantara, for which she was hailed as the "Princess of Philippine Television" at the 44th GMMSF Box-Office Entertainment Awards. She has since established herself as one of her generation's most successful actresses in Philippine television, starring in a few more top-rating soap operas, most notable being Ikaw Lamang (2014) for which she won a Gawad Tanglaw Award for Best Actress, Doble Kara (2015–17) for which she won her second Gawad Tanglaw Award for Best Actress, Asintado (2018) and 24/7 (2020).

In films, she made her debut in the family drama Way Back Home (2011). It was followed by the romantic drama A Moment in Time (2013), as Jillian Linden, for which she was nominated for the FAMAS Award for Best Actress, and the romantic horror Halik sa Hangin (2015), as Mia Generoso, for which she earned a nomination for the Young Critics Circle Award for Best Performance. Other notable appearances include the romantic comedy The Reunion (2012), the horror adventure The Strangers (2012), the independent drama Padre de Familia (2016) and romantic-drama Five Breakups and a Romance (2023).

== Early life and background ==
Mara Hautea Schnittka was born on March 19, 1995, in Pandacan, Manila, Philippines, to a Filipino mother, Gemma Hautea, and German father, Martin Schnittka. Schnittka left them when Montes was still a baby, and only her deaf mother raised her with the help of her grandmother, Flory Hautea. She has two younger brothers, Patrick and Paolo. She describes education as one of the tools to have a good life and she hopes to continuously work not just for herself but for her family as well. Montes has other relatives in Germany. In 2011, she finished high school with good grades at the Blessed Hope Christian School.

At the age of 5, Montes began pursuing advertising opportunities. She recalls the struggles she and her grandmother went through: commuting to castings, hurrying from school to shoots and missing a lot of family time in the process until she was cast in a milk brand, chocolate snack and fast food chain endorsements. However, she said she never competed with anyone and was just in the entertainment industry out of needs. Describing her ambitions as a child, Montes has said, "Since I was a child, I only had three dreams: to become a soldier, a chef and a flight attendant."

== Career ==
=== 2001–2010: Career beginnings ===
Montes started her acting career by appearing in commercials. She later appeared in minor roles when she was cast in a number of GMA shows such as Sana ay Ikaw na Nga in 2001 as the daughter of actors Robin Da Rosa and Angelu de Leon, and in some episodes of the now defunct drama anthology Magpakailanman. Montes went on to play guest roles on ABS-CBN's television shows such as Hiram (2004) and Maalaala Mo Kaya before landing a permanent spot in the kiddie gag show Goin' Bulilit in 2005.

She also appeared in other television series in 2008 including Ligaw na Bulaklak and I Love Betty La Fea. These parts led her to being cast as a series regular in Goin' Bulilit in which she played various roles in different comedic situations until her departure that year. Also that year, Montes, as Abby, starred in a Maalaala Mo Kaya episode titled "Card", a story of a girl who is longing for the love of her parents while under the care of a nursemaid. The following year, she appeared in Katorse with a guest role in the series' finale episode playing a shy girl Nellie. She was then cast as the teenage Mara, a character with her same name, in the youth-oriented show Gimik 2010.

=== 2010–2013: Breakthrough ===
In 2010, Montes' breakthrough role came when she portrayed the role of Clara del Valle / Clara David in the remake of Emil Cruz, Jr.'s longest-running classic soap opera Mara Clara originally by Gladys Reyes in 1992-97, a drama about teenage sibling rivalry, alongside her co-star and off-screen best friend Kathryn Bernardo. Montes changed her screen name from "Mara Montes" to "Julia Montes" to avoid confusion and complications, since the titular character Mara will be played by Bernardo. The finale episode of the series earned a 43.4% national ratings based on Kantar Media, making it the highest-rating teleserye episode to date aired on ABS-CBN that year. Montes' portrayal as the main antiheroine of the series received generally positive reviews and landed her lead roles in films and television series in her future projects.

In 2011, Montes made her film debut in the family drama Way Back Home, which opened in August 2011 to positive reviews, as Jessica "Jessie" Lorraine S. Santiago, alongside Mara Clara co-star Kathryn Bernardo. Montes garnered largely positive reviews by critics, with Abby Mendoza of Philippine Entertainment Portal writing, "One should applaud Julia Montes for deviating from the classic snotty, mean girl character who makes life miserable for the downtrodden Mara. It is Julia's strength to gain the sympathy of the audience while playing the angsty girl who harbors much pain. She has the ability to make her audience understand the pain her character is going through, and more importantly make them see where it is coming from. Julia was astounding." That same year, she worked with Bernado for the third time in the youth-oriented show entitled Growing Up, in which she portrayed the role of Samantha "Tammy" Magtoto, the daughter of an OFW who entrusted his care to Mikaella Dimalanta (played by Bernardo).

In 2012, greater success came to Montes when she starred with Coco Martin in the romantic drama series Walang Hanggan. The critically acclaimed series is loosely based on the 1991 film Hihintayin Kita sa Langit, a film based on the Emily Brontë classic novel, Wuthering Heights. Walang Hanggan features the undying love that revolves around characters from three different generations – the love triangle among Virginia, Margaret, and Joseph; the ill-fated lovers Marco and Emily; and young sweethearts Daniel and Katerina. The series includes Martin as Daniel Guidotti, Richard Gomez as Marco Montenegro, Dawn Zulueta as Emily Guidotti, Susan Roces as Virginia "Henya" Cruz, Helen Gamboa as Doña Margaret Montenegro, and Montes, as Katerina Alcantara. This also marks the first on-screen team-up of Martin and Montes, and the reunion project of eternal loveteam Richard Gomez and Dawn Zulueta. Writing for Philippine Entertainment Portal, Mark Angelo Ching considered Montes' decision to jump to a mature role after playing a teenager in Mara Clara seemingly to be a "gamble" at first, but all doubts are dispelled once she is seen holding her own against Martin, and believed that her "natural naïveté" works against the mature outlook of the actor's character.

The series and Montes' performance both earned widespread acclaim from critics as it maintained the top spot and dominated the viewers' ratings for most of its run, being the only Philippine drama of 2012 to exceed the 40% margin in ratings. The finale episode of the show garnered a 45.4% viewership rating nationwide. Walang Hanggan emerged as the most watched show during the second half of 2012, ruling the list with a whopping national TV rating of 38.4% based on Kantar Media. Due to the series' phenomenal success, Walang Hanggan was aired internationally in foreign countries along with Ina, Kapatid, Anak and Be Careful With My Heart. The series earned Montes the title of "Phenomenal Primetime Princess;" eventually she was named as the "Princess of Philippine Television" during the 44th Box Office Entertainment Awards (GMMSFI). Martin, on the other hand, acquired the title "Prince of Philippine Television". For their rapport in Walang Hanggan, Montes and Martin also placed 2nd as the most popular loveteams at the 4th FMTM Awards.

Montes then starred in other two 2012 films, as Ligaya in The Reunion, and as Pat in The Strangers. With nationwide revenues of over ₱68.1 million for the former, the film remains her highest-grossing release. In 2013, Montes starred in the romantic drama A Moment in Time alongside Martin, as a follow-up success of their preeminent team-up in Walang Hanggan. The film grossed over ₱64,543,391 nationwide, and Montes received her first nomination for the FAMAS Award for Best Actress. Jennifer Dugena of Philippine Entertainment Portal praised her performance, writing: "Julia plays the part with exquisitely combined innocence and maturity. She is perfect as a young woman coming-of-age to the truths and facts of life. Her vulnerability and strength shines through as she submits herself to the emotional machinations inflicted by Martin's character Patrick. Her emotions are solid, intense and very affecting. Her acting chops slices away any doubts about her ability to portray young or adult characters. Talent-wise, she is clearly way ahead of her contemporaries."

Later in 2013, she appeared in a Maalaala Mo Kaya episode titled "Krus", a story about a girl named Diana who was sold to a prostitution den by her own foster mother at a young age of 15. The episode drew a nationwide audience share of 34.2%, making it the No. 1 most watched program on March 9, according to data from Kantar Media. That same year, Montes co-starred with Enchong Dee and Enrique Gil in another television series Muling Buksan ang Puso which centers on the themes of forgiveness and second chances. Montes portrayed the role of Sarah Beltran, a role which she said in an interview was "tailor-fit" for her real age. The series ranked 10th in Top 15 programs from January to December 2013.

=== 2014–2018: Continued success ===
Montes' profile continued to grow in 2014 when she appeared as Mona Roque-Hidalgo, the lifelong loyal friend and secret admirer of Samuel, in the period drama series Ikaw Lamang where she reunited with Martin as Samuel Hidalgo / Gabriel Hidalgo. It also starred Kim Chiu as Isabelle Miravelez-Hidalgo / Andrea Hidalgo and Jake Cuenca as Franco Hidalgo. She received a nomination for Best Drama Supporting Actress in the series at the PMPC Star Awards for TV 2014. In January 2015 at the 13th Gawad Tanglaw (Gawad Tagapuring mga Akademisyan ng Aninong Gumagalaw) for television, Montes, tied with veteran actress Angel Locsin, won a Best Actress award for her role in Ikaw Lamang. During the same year, Montes completed work on Adolfo Alix Jr.'s family drama Padre de Familia, which was released on February 20, 2016, with Martin and Nora Aunor. Filming took place in Malaysia.

After her character's departure from Ikaw Lamang, Montes starred in the romantic horror Halik sa Hangin with Gerald Anderson and JC de Vera. The film, under the direction of Emmanuel Quindo Palo, marked Montes' third collaboration with Palo and was theatrically released on January 28, 2015. Montes continued to draw praises and recognition from film critics for her role as Mia Generoso in Halik sa Hangin. In a review from Philippine Entertainment Portal, author Jocelyn Valle stated that "Julia, the actress, shows great commitment and earnestness in playing the character of Mia. She makes the viewer feel Mia's emotional stages of entering into the territory of romantic love — apprehension, excitement, caution, bliss — until reality bites. She shines the brightest in the pivotal scene where Mia is suspected to becoming a mental case, and Mia has to convince everybody that she's telling the truth." Montes' performance earned her a Young Critics Circle nomination for Best Performance.

Later in 2015, Dreamscape publicity head Eric John Salut confirmed on February 12, 2015, via Twitter that Montes will be reunited once again with Walang Hanggan leading man Coco Martin in an upcoming TV project. Martin and Montes reunited in a new chapter of Wansapanataym's summer special called "Yamishita's Treasures", marking the second collaboration of the two as a loveteam in television since their hit TV series Walang Hanggan. After watching the premiere of Halik sa Hangin, Martin stated in an interview that he personally requested for Montes as his leading lady for his new project because he was proud and impressed particularly by the young actress' outstanding performance in Halik sa Hangin. Montes starred as Tanya, a princess in a world of fairies, who meets Yami and helps him retrieve a treasure in her world. Wansapanataym's "Yamishita's Treasures" ran for 12 weeks, from March 22 to June 14, 2015. Later that same year, Montes appeared in an Maalaala Mo Kaya episode titled "Picture", a story about a young woman named Rosa who fell in love with a man who, unknown to her, is already married. The episode registered a national TV rating of 37.2%, making it one of the most watched episodes of Maalaala Mo Kaya that year.

After accomplishing several film and television projects involving Halik sa Hangin, Wansapanataym, and in an episode of Maalaala Mo Kaya, Montes headlined Doble Kara in 2015 (co-starring Carmina Villarroel, Mylene Dizon, Ariel Rivera, Allen Dizon and Sam Milby). The series revolves around the lives and story of twins Kara and Sara, who got separated during their childhood due to Kara's urgent need of cure for leukemia. Montes assumed the roles of identical twin sisters Kara and Sara, who share the same appearance but exhibit completely different personas. Doble Kara is produced by Dreamscape Entertainment Television, and premiered on August 24, 2015. Montes received a Best Actress Award for two consecutive years at the 2016 ceremony of the 14th Gawad Tanglaw Awards, as well as a PMPC Star Award nomination in the Best Dramatic Actress category for her role. In February 2016, Star Style magazine noted in a 2016 feature that Montes seemed dedicated to developing herself as a serious actress rather than a film star. Montes starred alongside JC Santos in Wansapanataym's "Annika Pintasera" on April 2, 2017, where she played as Annika de Cuadra, a rich girl who does not value the people around her. The series scored an average national TV rating of 31.7% and landed on 4th spot for the Top 10 programs in May 2017.

In 2018, Montes stars in the political drama Asintado alongside Lorna Tolentino, Paulo Avelino, Shaina Magdayao, Agot Isidro, Cherry Pie Picache, and Aljur Abrenica. She plays Ana Dimasalang, a paramedic who became Gael Ojeda's personal nurse after saving him from an accident and fell in love with him; she becomes involved in an assassination plot arranged by the del Mundos and Ojedas upon witnessing their plan.

=== 2019–present: Hiatus and comeback ===
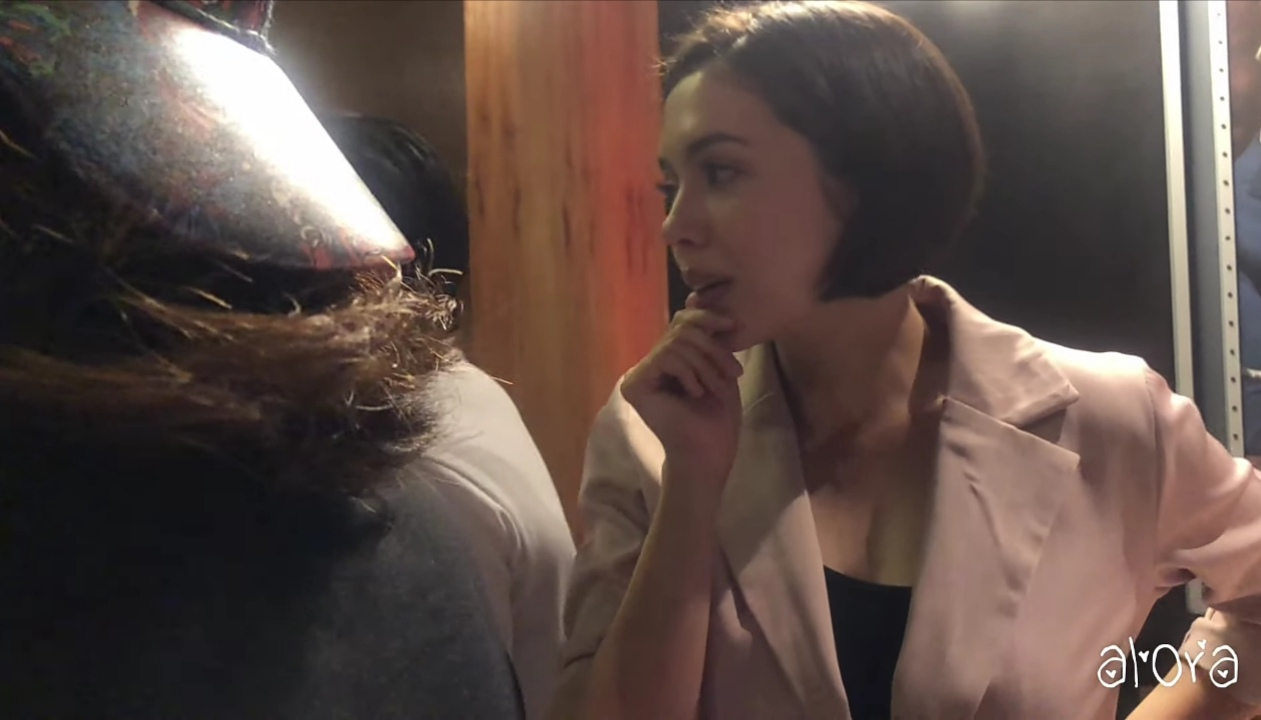
Montes at the viewing party of the series 24/7 in 2020

Following the conclusion of Asintado, Montes took a break from the showbusiness and spent time with her father, Martin Schnittka, in Germany. She made her television comeback in the weekly action-drama series 24/7 in February 2020. According to Kantar Media, the pilot episode of the series received over 27% TV ratings, becoming the most watched weekend show. After four episodes, the series was discontinued following the global shutdown due to COVID-19 pandemic. In September 2020, she enrolled in an online class at the Southville International School and Colleges. The following year, she joined the casts of the long-running series Ang Probinsyano as Mara. In September 2022, Cornerstone Entertainment announced that Montes will be starring with Arjo Atayde and Sid Lucero in the action-thriller movie Topakk. The film was first screened at the 78th Cannes Film Festival in France and premiered on the 76th Locarno Film Festival in Switzerland.

In October 2023, Montes starred with Alden Richards in the romantic drama film Five Breakups and a Romance. Her portrayal was met with praises from the critics, with Villanueva of Manila Standard noting that both leads gave "compelling performances" which helped elevate the film. The film has earned ₱30 million at the local box-office during its first week.

== Personal life ==
In June 2015, Montes completed a culinary course at the Center for Culinary Arts, Manila along with her fellow actress Yam Concepcion. She is a practicing Catholic.

In December 2017, Montes was reunited with her birth father, Martin Schnittka, at Bellini's, Cubao, Quezon City. She revealed via Instagram about her encounter with her father and expressed gratitude towards her German cousin Michelle Lloyd and CocoJul Bukayo fans for paving the way to meet him.

Montes has been in a romantic relationship with Coco Martin since 2011. The couple kept their relationship private until Martin publicly confirmed it in May 2023 stating they have been together for twelve years. At the time, Montes would have been sixteen years old while Martin was thirty.

== Reception and acting style ==
Montes has been described in the media as one of the most talented actresses of her generation, and frequently referred to as "Royal Princess of Drama", and "Daytime Drama Queen". She is noted for playing in a range of material from horror to drama and has played roles in both high-profile, mainstream productions, and low-budget independent films. Directors Emmanuel Palo and Trina Dayrit, who directed her in different Dreamscape Entertainment releases such as Walang Hanggan, A Moment in Time, Ikaw Lamang, and Doble Kara, have praised her versatility and maturity. Actor Sam Milby described Montes as "one of the most important actresses of this time", praising her prowess in playing mature roles at a young age.

Montes says that she finds it fitting for people to give her mature roles since she "acts and looks a lot more mature" than her age and most girls of her age. The journalist Irish Christianne Dizon of The Philippine Star has identified this as her "trademark" in many of her best projects, adding, "In this age where rabid love team fans compete for the No. 1 trending spot on Twitter nightly, Julia is taking the road less traveled, choosing herself as partner-in-crime instead of a good-looking boy." Her Doble Kara co-star John Lapus has praised her effortless acting that makes her performance classic. She started her acting studies in Star Magic. ABS-CBN vice president Johnny Manahan has favorably compared her craft to that of Claudine Barretto and considers her "incandescent on screen and as an actress who is passionate about her craft". In 2012, The Philippine Star called her acting "beyond her age". In a 2016 interview with Star Style, Montes elaborated:

I like that I have the chance to be in someone else's shoes. Once I portray someone else's life, I get to understand who that person is. It gives me a much bigger and better perspective on everyone's lives around me.

As a role model to young people, she is particularly known for her grounded and family-oriented personality. Early in her career, Montes established a reputation for being her family's breadwinner, amidst the absence of her biological father. She managed to buy her own house at age 17 and was able to put up a salon for her grandmother, who had to sacrifice her salon business to pull their efforts together to support Montes at the start of her career. In 2016 and 2017, Montes was awarded for the Makabata Stars on the Anak TV Awards. ABS-CBN's Push.com says she is humble about her profession, saying she is "just a person with a job" to make ends meet, attracts little gossip or tabloid attention, and casual in her appearance. In 2015, she was included in Candy Magazine's listing of the "7 Amazing Women Who Should Be Your Life Pegs" features.

Several media publications have noted Montes' attractiveness. She appeared in Yes! magazine's annual listing of the "100 Most Beautiful Stars", topping the list with Kathryn Bernardo in 2013. From 2012 to 2016, she was included in FHM's 100 sexiest women, and won Star Magic Ball's "Sweetheart of the Night", and "Female Star of the Night" awards in 2012 and 2015, respectively.

== Acting credits and accolades ==
Montes has received one FAMAS Award for Best Actress nomination, two PMPC Star Award nominations, and one Young Critics Circle Award for Best Performance nomination. From these, she has won a FAMAS Award for the German Moreno Youth Achievement. In addition, Montes won two Gawad Tanglaw Awards for Best Actress for her performances in Ikaw Lamang (2014) and Doble Kara (2015–17). She also won a Princess of Philippine Television Award for Walang Hanggan (2012). Her other accolades include four FMTM Awards for Walang Hanggan and a TV Series Craze Award for Doble Kara.

== See also ==
- List of Filipino actresses
- Cinema of the Philippines
- Television in the Philippines
