= Center for Culinary Arts, Manila =

Private school in Quezon City, Philippines

Center for Culinary Arts Manila
- Type: Private
- Established: August 26, 1996 (29 years and 294 days)
- Religious affiliation: None (Nonsectarian)
- President: Susana P. Guerrero
- Location: Quezon City, Metro Manila, Philippines; 14°38′07″N 121°04′26″E
- Website: Official website

The Center for Culinary Arts, Manila (CCA) is an institution that provides culinary education in the Philippines. It was formally established in 1996 and is currently located in Katipunan Avenue, Quezon City, Philippines. It has satellite campuses in Farmers Market, Cubao; a Restaurant School at SM Mall of Asia called Oceana; and at Eastwood Mall called CCA Kitchen. It offers diploma and certificate programs accredited by the Accrediting Commission of the American Culinary Federation. The school also offers basic courses for beginners and professionals as well as international degree succession and certification.

== History ==
CCA, Manila, first opened as the Cravings Bakeshop on October 16, 1988, which laid the foundation for the Cravings Group of Companies.

Dr. John Knapp, project coordinator of the Northern Alberta Institute of Technology in Canada, and the University of the Philippines-College of Home Economics spearheaded the operations. It took three years to assess the needs of the industry, formulate an effective curriculum, form a team of chef instructors, and construct the culinary school. CCA was established on August 26, 1996, followed by the launch of the country's first formal culinary education program, the Diploma in Culinary Arts and Technology Management (DCAM), in 1997.

== Education ==
=== Academic programs ===
The CCA offers both diploma and certificate programs in either Culinary Arts or Baking and Pastry Arts. Apart from lectures and spending at least 5 hours daily in the kitchen laboratories, students undergo hotel work for their apprenticeship to acquire mastery of techniques.

The school also offers an International Degree Succession program, which is available through their partner schools should one decide to enhance their one- or two-year program and earn a degree. These schools are William Angliss Institute in Australia, Johnson and Wales University in the US, Les Roches in Switzerland, Thames Valley University in the UK, and the Northern Alberta Institute in Canada.

Graduates of two-year program in Culinary Arts & Technology Management and one-year program in Baking and Pastry Arts who are active members of American Culinary Federation Foundation are eligible for ACF certification.

=== Continuing education programs ===
The CCA offers continuing education courses for basic, intermediate, and advanced professionals. It also features a creative recreational course for profit. A kitchen discovery class for hobbyists and enthusiasts is also offered.

== Course offerings ==
=== Academic programs ===
- Bachelor of Science in Culinary Management
- Diploma in Culinary Arts and Technology Management
- Diploma in Culinary Agriculture
- Certificate in Baking and Pastry Arts Program

=== Continuing education programs ===
- Fast Track Pro Chef Program
- Fundamentals in Culinary Arts Course
- Fundamentals in Baking and Pastry Arts Course
- Global Cuisines (Advanced Culinary Arts)
- Advanced Baking and Pastry Arts Course
- Team Bonding Workshop
- Kitchen Discovery Class
- Culinary Arts in Special Diets
- ServSafe (Review & Certification)
- Catering Management
- Young Chefs Boot Camp
- Urbane Classes (Lifestyle Courses)

== Satellite schools ==
Center for Culinary Arts, Manila
(Katipunan Main Campus)
287 Katipunan Avenue, Loyola Heights, Quezon City, Philippines
CCA at Farmers Market
2/F beside the Administration Office Farmers Market, Araneta Center, Cubao, Quezon City, Philippines
CCA Kitchen
3rd Level, Eastwood Mall, Eastwood City, E. Rodriguez, Jr. Ave. Bagumbayan, Quezon City, Philippines
CCA OCEANA
Building A, San Miguel by the Bay, SM Mall of Asia, Pasay, Philippines
CCA Podium. Culinary School. Market Cafe.
5th Level, SM Podium, ADB Avenue, Ortigas Center Pasig, Philippines
