= The Reunion (2012 film) =

- Directed by: Frasco Santos Mortiz
- Screenplay by: Ays de Guzman; John Paul Bedia; Alex Calleja
- Story by: Enrico Santos; Jon Santos
- Produced by: Charo Santos-Concio; Malou N. Santos
- Starring: Enrique Gil; Xian Lim; Enchong Dee; Kean Cipriano; Bangs Garcia; Julia Montes; Megan Young; Jessy Mendiola; Matt Evans; Cristine Reyes
- Cinematography: David Abaya
- Edited by: Marya Ignacio
- Music by: Michael Abadam; Cesar Francis S. Concio
- Production company: Star Cinema
- Release date: August 15, 2012
- Running time: 103 minutes
- Country: Philippines
- Languages: Filipino; English
- Box office: ₱68.1 million

The Reunion (stylized as THE RƎUNION) is a 2012 Filipino teen romantic comedy film directed by Frasco Mortiz and stars Enchong Dee, Xian Lim, Enrique Gil, Kean Cipriano together with Julia Montes, Jessy Mendiola, Megan Young, Bangs Garcia, and Cristine Reyes. The film was released nationwide on August 15, 2012, by Star Cinema.

== Plot ==
The Reunion follows the lives of four long-time friends—Lloyd, Joem, Pat, and Bogs—who have maintained a close, sibling-like bond since their high school years. Following their graduation from college, the men navigate various personal and professional challenges in adulthood, eventually realizing that their lives lack fulfillment and direction. In an attempt to address their individual struggles and achieve their long-term aspirations, they determine that they must confront unresolved issues from their shared past. This process of reflection begins following their attendance at a high school reunion, an event that serves as the catalyst for significant shifts in their personal relationships and life trajectories.

== Cast ==
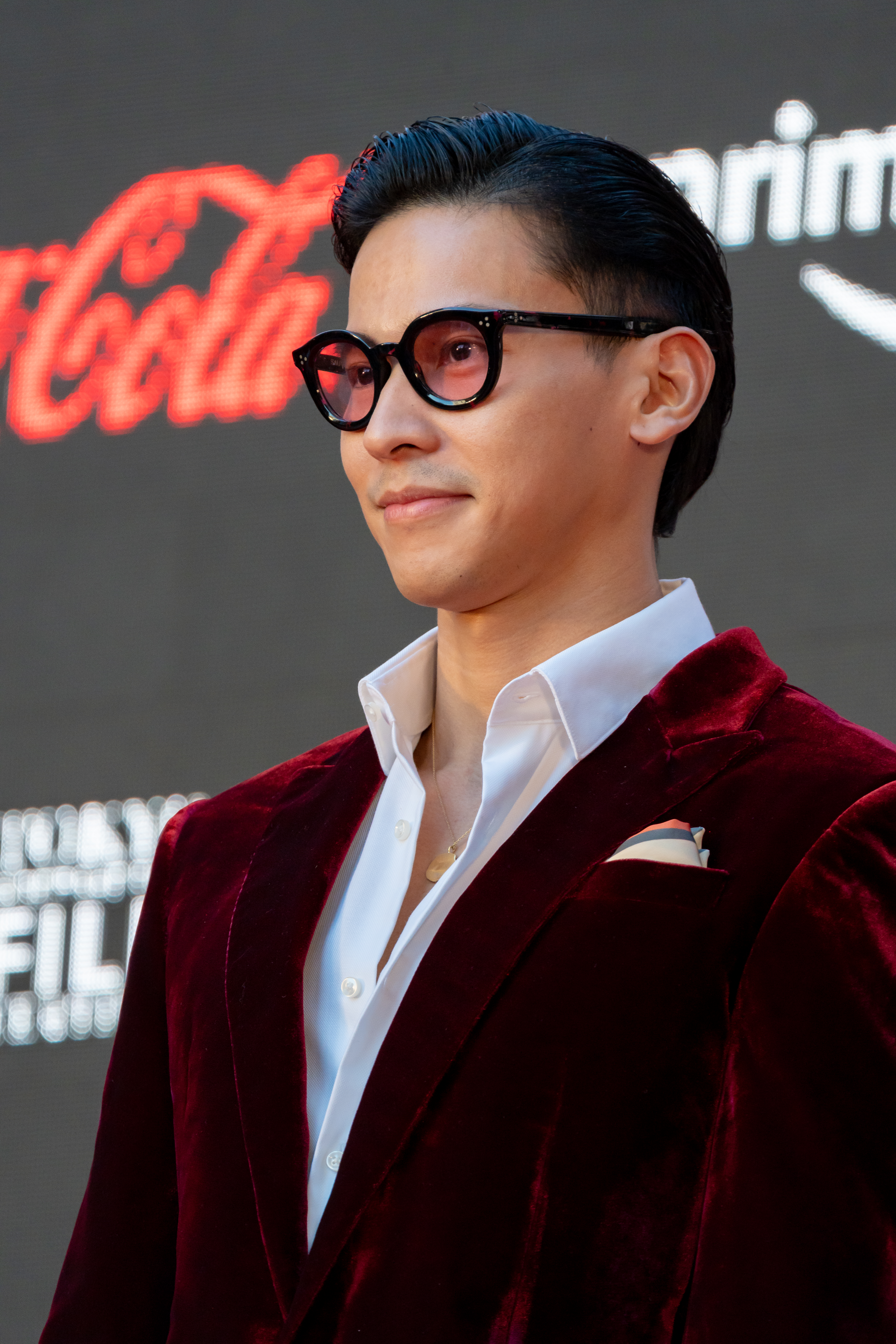
Enchong Dee portrays Lloyd Alvarado

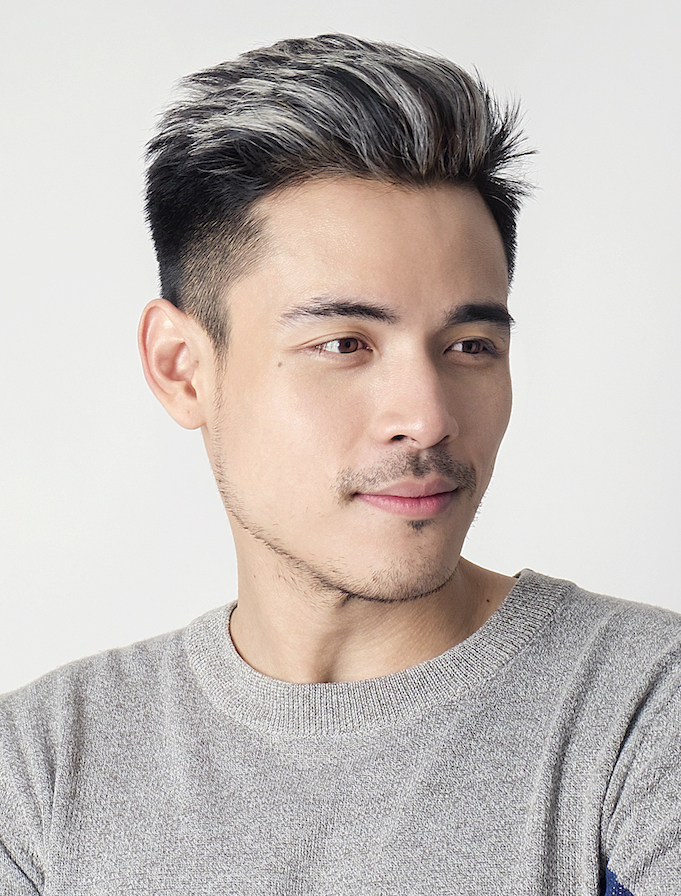
Xian Lim portrays Joaquin "Joax" Zabala

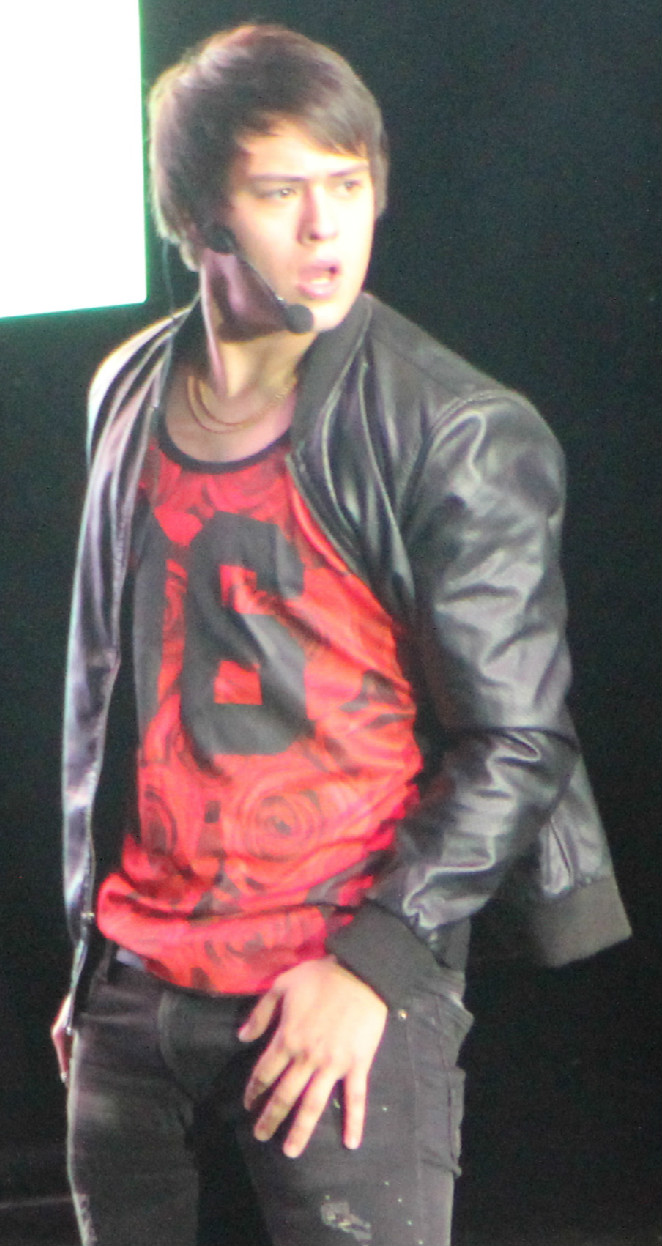
Enrique Gil portrays Boggs Alvarez

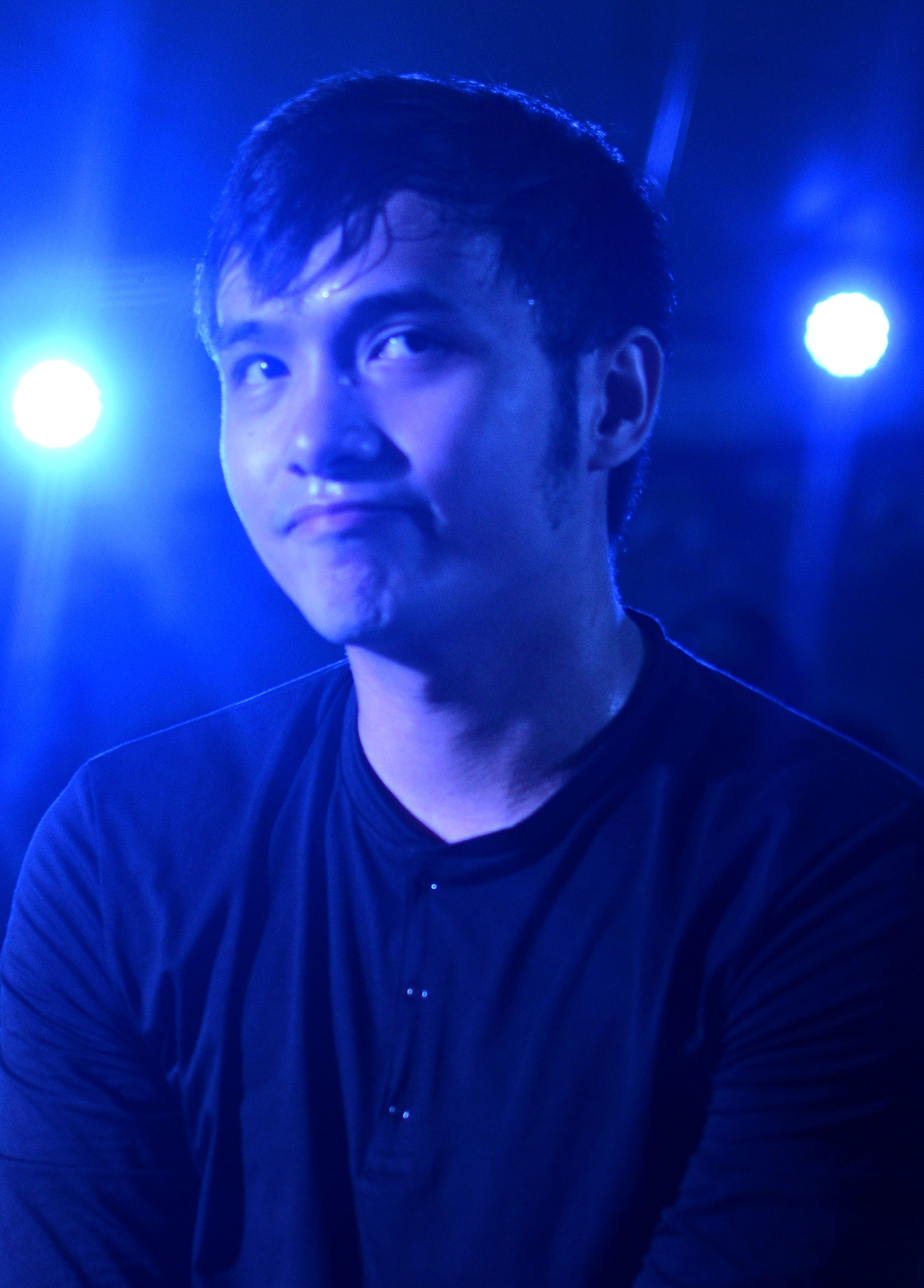
Kean Cipriano portrays Patrick "Pat" dela Torre

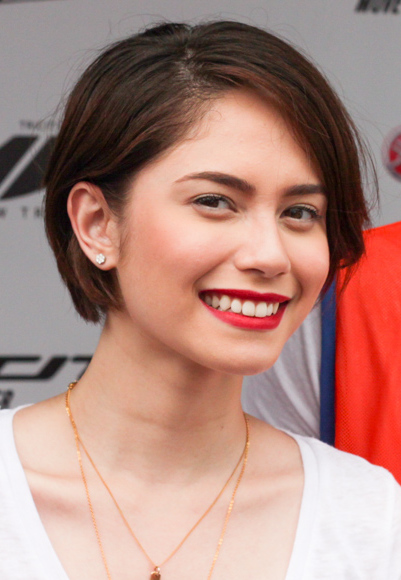
Jessy Mendiola portrays Allison "Ali" Marasigan

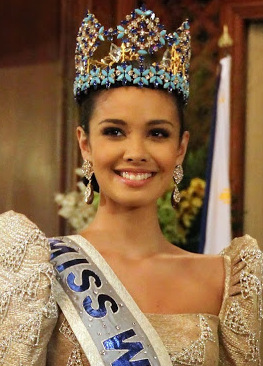
Megan Young portrays Antonia "Toyang" Castro

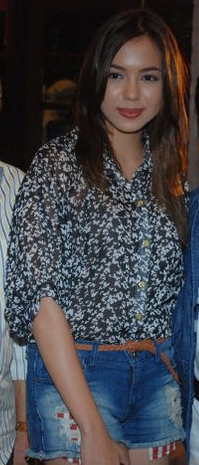
Julia Montes portrays Ligaya Bustamante

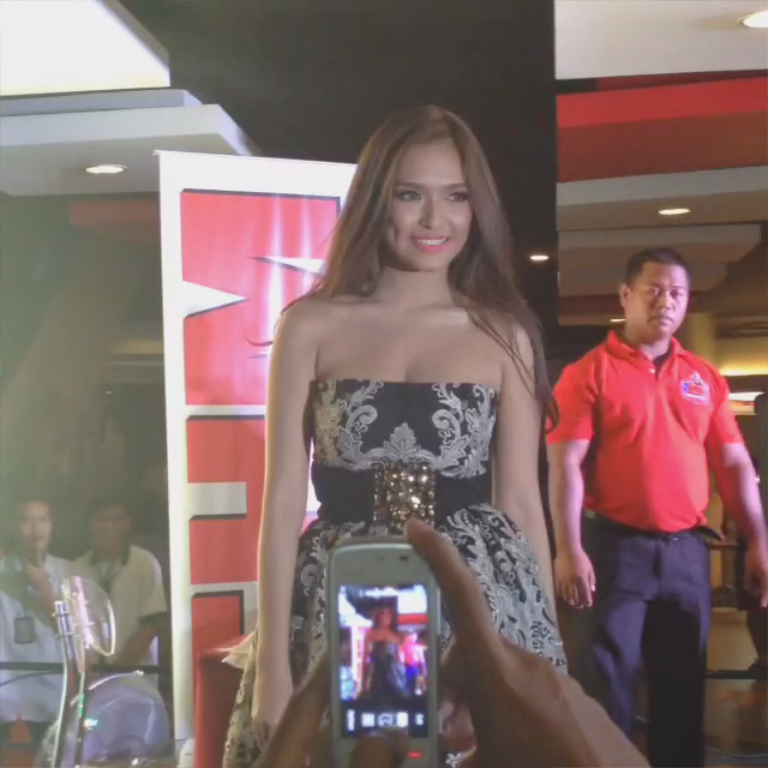
Bangs Garcia portrays Shirley Suarez

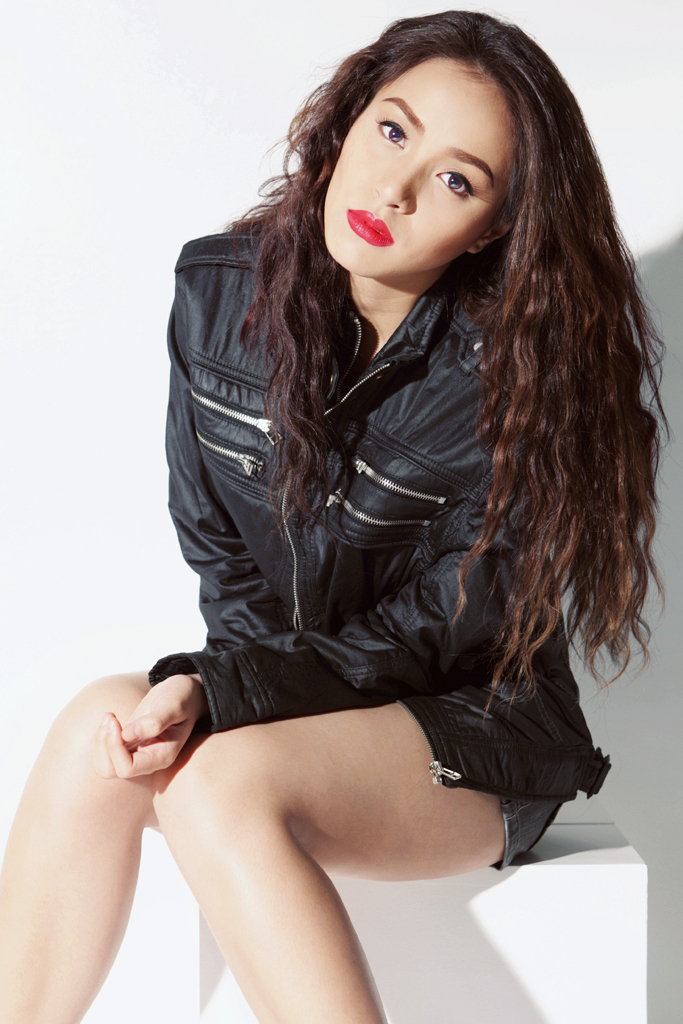
Cristine Reyes portrays Ara Reyes

=== Main cast ===
- Enchong Dee as Lloyd Alvarado - The hopeless romantic of the group and now a graphic artist. He thought that all of his friends' karma comes from when they cheated on their respective first love when they were in high school. His first love is Ara (Cristine Reyes), who is now engaged and he plans to find her in hopes of winning her back. But along his journey, he finally realized that he loves his best friend, Ali (Jessy Mendiola).
- Xian Lim as Joaquin "Joax" Zabala - He is a valet at a hotel. He has high aspirations in life. He found Toyang (Megan Young), who is now a nurse, and learns that Toyang got pregnant and he is the father. Now he is enjoying the company of his son until he goes to Canada with Toyang and her fiance.
- Enrique Gil as Boggs Alvarez - The playboy of the group. He is working as a real-estate agent. But of all of the girls he met, he is still in love with Ligaya (Julia Montes) and will do anything to find her and win her heart again. A year later, he and Ligaya got married.
- Kean Cipriano as Patrick "Pat" dela Torre - He wants to be in a band and to be famous someday. He found out that Shirley (Bangs Garcia), his first love who is conservative when they were in high school, is now a bikini model and he feels guilty about it. But their love is rekindled one more time.
- Jessy Mendiola as Allison "Ali" Marasigan - Lloyd's best friend who secretly has a crush on him. She wants the best for her best friend and encouraged him to apply in Singapore. Lloyd realized later on that he loves Ali and follows her at the airport before she leaves for a job in Singapore.
- Megan Young as Antonia "Toyang" Castro - She is Joax' ex-girlfriend. She is a nurse and had a son, Miggy and Joax is the father. She didn't tell him about Miggy because when he lied about her not being pregnant, Joax was so happy. She is now going to Canada with his son and fiance. But she allowed Joax to be with Miggy for quite some time.
- Julia Montes as Ligaya Bustamante - She and Boggs met when Boggs hit her with a ball in the head. Their love story began here but when she found out that all of Boggs' friends including him is in Julie's car, she got jealous and they broke up. Boggs found her in Laguna in her family's cafe but found out that she got in an accident when she attempted to climb the Hill of Tears alone, resulting in her left leg being amputated. Boggs loves her so much that he didn't mind it and told her that she is the perfect girl for him.
- Bangs Garcia as Shirley Suarez - She is the conservative girlfriend of Pat. She is left heartbroken because of what her boyfriend did. She became a model and Pat feels guilty because he thought that that was all his fault. Shirley forgives him and they got back together.
- Cristine Reyes as Ara Reyes - He is Lloyd's first love, she forgave and forget what Lloyd did to her when they were still together. She is now engaged, and Lloyd tried to find her in hopes of winning her back again.
- Matt Evans as Jay Lopez - He is Ali's gay best friend and knows that Ali likes Lloyd. He is a great friend for Ali and always wants the best for her.

=== Supporting cast ===
- Tom Rodriguez as Aljoven - he is the enemy of the group. He is now a rich businessman and owns many gasoline stations.
- Joseph Marco as Jeric - friend of Aljoven and enemy of Lloyd's friends, now a lieutenant in the police force.
- Bryan Santos as Von - also a friend of Aljoven and enemy of Lloyd's friends, now an airport police at NAIA.
- Ivan Dorschner as Paul Michael - friend of Aljoven and enemy of Lloyd's group. His occupation is unknown. Jay also finds him cute.
- Alodia Gosiengfiao as Julie - She is the reason why the boys' respective girlfriends broke-up with them.
- Slater Young as Bryan - Ningning's fiance
- Renz Fernandez as Rico - He is a friend and classmate of Pat's.
- Karen Dematera as Ningning - She has a crush on Boggs but is now engaged to Bryan. She appears to be a great dancer during high school in POP.
- Bodie Cruz as Coco- Jay's Violent, Lazy, and Jobless Brother who always beats him when he gets drunk
- Louise Abuel as Miggy Castro - Joax and Toyang's son. He is going to move to Canada to live with his mother and his mother's fiance.
- Ricardo Cepeda as Anton Zabala - Joax's father who doesn't treat him as his son.
- Bing Pimentel as Melba Zabala - Joax's mother.
- Nova Villa as Mamang - Lloyd's grandmother
- Ariel Ureta as Papang - Lloyd's grandfather
- Ahron Villena as Aldrin Alvarez - Bogg's demanding brother.
- Yayo Aguila as Carmen Alvarez - Bogg's loving mother.
- Ramon Christopher as Danilo Alvarez - Bogg's father.
- Lito Pimentel as Temyo dela Torre - Pat's sarcastic father.
- Devon Seron as Paola dela Torre - Pat's loving and caring sister
- Irma Adlawan as Irma dela Torre - Pat's mother who believes that her son will be famous
- Ronnie Lazaro as Mang Ben Suarez - Shirley's father
- Alexa Ilacad as Marie Suarez - Shirley's younger sister
- Gina Pareño as Aling Nena - she owns a store that Lloyd, Boggs, Joax, and Pat hang when they were in high school. He bailed the boys out of jail.
- Janus Del Prado as Huweyingnon (Wellington) - he got in a car accident because of Joax and he is the reason Joax found Toyang when they brought him to the hospital.
- Bodjie Pascua as POP Principal/Priest
- Hyubs Azarcon as Drunken Man
- 6Cyclemind as themselves

== Reception ==
The film was a moderate box-office success, grossing P68.1 million upon its theatrical run.

== Trivia ==
- The main protagonists resemble Eraserheads members
- The movie soundtrack are songs by the Eraserheads
- Some of the characters' names are from Eraserheads' songs like Toyang (Toyang), Shirley, Ligaya (Ligaya), Ali (Alapaap), Julie (Julie Tearjerky), Aling Nena (Tindahan ni Aling Nena), Ning Ning (Paro Parung Ningning), and Jay (Hey Jay).
- The school was named as Padre Orlando Prudenciano University or Pop U! which was taken from the E heads unofficial album or a sample demo.
- Joax, Lloyd, Jay and Ali checked into a hotel called Andalusian Hotel (taken from the Eraserheads song "Andalusian Dog").
- The scene where Miggy (Louise Abuel) and Joax (Xian Lim) play the piano was inspired by the Eraserheads album Sticker Happy.

== International Screening ==
- August 24 – September 13 (Guam)
