= Five Breakups and a Romance =

2023 Philippine romantic drama film by Irene Emma Villamor

- Theatrical release poster
- Directed by: Irene Emma Villamor
- Written by: Irene Emma Villamor
- Produced by: Jose Mari Abacan; Alden Richards
- Starring: Alden Richards; Julia Montes
- Cinematography: Tey Clamor
- Edited by: Renard Torres
- Music by: Len Calvo
- Production companies: GMA Pictures; Cornerstone Studios; Myriad Entertainment
- Distributed by: GMA Pictures
- Release date: October 18, 2023
- Running time: 102 minutes
- Country: Philippines
- Language: Filipino
- Box office: ₱100 million

Five Breakups and a Romance is a 2023 Philippine romantic drama film written and directed by Irene Emma Villamor. The film stars Alden Richards and Julia Montes. This marks Richards' production debut through Myriad Entertainment, as well as Montes' first film since the 2016 film Padre de Familia.

== Plot ==
In 2015, Lance Sandoval, a medical student visiting friends in Singapore, meets and begins a relationship with Justine Ramos, a fashion designer who has moved there to pursue a rising career. When Lance returns home to the Philippines to resume medical school, Justine agrees to keep in touch, staying in Singapore to climb the ladder as a fashion brand manager. They find long-distance relationships to be unsatisfactory.

After nearly a year, Justine moves to the Philippines to reunite with Lance, exchanging her high-paying Singaporean job for one as a consultant to a fast-fashion brand in the Philippines. The couple struggles in their relationship and in their individual lives – Lance with medical school, and Justine with her new job. This leads to tension between them, and they get into a heated argument. They break up but still feel connected to each other.

In 2018, at the renewal of vows of Justine's parents, they reunite and fall in love again. Later, they move into Lance's condo together. Lance is now a general surgeon. When the COVID-19 pandemic begins in 2020, he is on the pandemic's frontline. An infidelity ensues, causing another break-up.

Later, Justine has rebuilt her life in Manila, establishing her own fashion brand, as Lance continues to practice medicine. They reunite again in 2023 when her father gets hospitalized. They briefly catch up on one another's lives before finally saying goodbye.

== Cast ==
Main cast

- Alden Richards as Lance Sandoval
- Julia Montes as Justine Ramos

Supporting cast

- Roxie Smith as Pia
- Lotlot de Leon as Milet
- Jackie Lou Blanco as Maggie
- Gil Cuerva as Matt
- Analyn Barro as Sophie
- Michael Sager as Calvin Sandoval
- Ian Pangilinan
- Soliman Cruz as Roger

== Production ==
Five Breakups and a Romance was first announced on April 18, 2023. According to The Philippine Star on April 23, 2023, the cast and the production of the film had finished their filming, editing and dubbing after a 13 day shoot. The film was shot mainly in Singapore and Manila's Bonifacio Global City.

Filming

The cast filmed the movie in Singapore in March 2023, and completed the rest of the scenes in Manila in April.

== Promotion ==
A scene drop from the film was released early in September 2023. The official teaser of the film was released on September 16, 2023. It was followed by the release of a two-part in-depth discussion with Montes and Richards titled Five Breakups and a Romance: The Actors.

== Release ==
Five Breakups and a Romance was released in the Philippines on October 18, 2023, initially in 210 cinemas and was expanded to 231 cinemas on its second day and eventually to 242 cinemas. A day before its general release, a premiere night of the film was held at SM Megamall.

The film was released in selected cinemas in California on November 24, 2023, and in 42 cinemas in the Middle East on November 30, 2023. It was shown at Palace Dendy Brighton Cinema 4 in Melbourne, Australia, on November 25 and 26, and at the Hoyts Blacktown Xtremescreen Cinema in Sydney on December 2 and 3.

== Reception ==
=== Box office ===
Five Breakups and a Romance earned ₱30 million ($US 538,000) in its opening week at the box-office. As of December 12, 2023, the film had grossed ₱100 million ($US 1.79 million) at the Philippine box-office.

=== Critical response ===
Writing for The Philippine Star, Jerald Uy gave the film a positive review commending how it navigates through the audience's shared nostalgia, writing, "The story structure is a smart way to tap into the viewers’ recent memories of love and loss." Uy also praised Richards' and Montes' performances and Villamor's script, saying: "Her beautiful script seamlessly complements the breathtaking shots of the movie." Fred Hawson of ABS-CBN News also reviewed the film positively, rating it 8 out of 10 stars and stating: "both [stars] imbued their characters with passion so palpable that you feel the exuberance of their thrill, pain of their regret and weight of their emotions." Angelica Villanueva in her review for Manila Standard also gave a positive review, stating that Richards and Montes' performances elevated the film and delivered a "compelling performance", further adding: "Their on-screen chemistry is undeniable, from the delivery of intense lines to the passionate exchanges in a particular scene. They bring a magnetic charm to the film, making it an unforgettable experience."

In the Daily Tribune, however, Stephanie Mayo wrote that he enjoyed Richards' performance but gave the film an unfavorable review on the whole: "Overall, Five Breakups is a paper-thin, hackneyed love story masked by gorgeous visuals. A visual spectacle without drama or romance ... nothing in this drama resonates." For ClickTheCity.com, Wanggo Gallaga found a lack of chemistry between the leading characters and rated the film 2 stars out of 5, writing, "[T]he film favors telling over showing. ... We need to see it when Richards and Montes go through these raw, emotional moments".

== Accolades ==
Award	Year	Category	Nominee	Result	Ref
Box Office Entertainment Awards	2024	Box Office King	Alden Richards	Won	
Gawad Lasallianeta Awards	2023	Most Outstanding Filipino Film	Five Breakups and a Romance	Nominated	
Gawad Lasallianeta Awards	2023	Most Outstanding Film Actress	Julia Montes	Nominated	
Gawad Lasallianeta Awards	2023	Most Outstanding Film Actor	Alden Richards	Won	
Luna Awards	2024	Best Screenplay	Irene Villamor	Nominated	
Luna Awards	2024	Best Cinematographer	Tey Clamor	Nominated	
Luna Awards	2024	Best Musical Scorer	Len Calvo	Nominated	
PMPC Star Awards for Movies	2024	Movie of the Year	Five Breakups and a Romance	Nominated	
PMPC Star Awards for Movies	2024	Movie Director of the Year	Irene Emma Villamor	Nominated	
PMPC Star Awards for Movies	2024	Movie Actor of the Year	Alden Richards (Note: tied with Dingdong Dantes)	Won	
PMPC Star Awards for Movies	2024	Movie Ensemble Acting of the Year	—N/a	Nominated	
PMPC Star Awards for Movies	2024	Movie Musical Scorer of the Year	Len Calvo	Nominated	
PMPC Star Awards for Movies	2024	Movie Production Designer of the Year	Ferdi Abuel	Nominated	
PMPC Star Awards for Movies	2024	Movie Loveteam of the Year	Alden Richards and Julia Montes	Won	
The EDDYS	2024	Box Office Heroes	Julia Montes	Won	
The EDDYS	2024	Box Office Heroes	Alden Richards	Won	
The EDDYS	2024	Best Actor	Alden Richards	Nominated	
The EDDYS	2024	Best Actress	Julia Montes	Won	
The EDDYS	2024	Best Production Design	Ferdie Abuel	Nominated	
VP Choice Awards	2024	Movie Actress of the Year	Julia Montes	Nominated	
VP Choice Awards	2024	Movie Actor of the Year	Alden Richards	Won	
