= 24/7 (Philippine TV series) =

2020 Philippine television drama series

- Title card
- Genre: Action; Drama; Crime; Thriller; Mystery; Science fiction; Suspense
- Written by: David Franche Diuco
- Directed by: Manny Q. Palo; Darnel Joy Villaflor; FM Reyes
- Starring: Julia Montes
- Opening theme: "Hanggang sa Huli" by Moira Dela Torre
- Country of origin: Philippines
- Original language: Filipino
- No. of episodes: 4 (list of episodes)

Production
- Executive producer: Roldeo T. Endrinal
- Production location: Quezon City
- Editor: Rommel Malimban
- Running time: 60-75 minutes
- Production companies: Dreamscape Entertainment; Cinemedia

Original release
- Network: ABS-CBN (2020)
- Release: February 23 – March 15, 2020

24/7 is a Philippine action thriller television series broadcast by ABS-CBN. Directed by Manny Q. Palo, Darnel Joy Villaflor and FM Reyes, starring Julia Montes. It aired on the network's Yes Weekend line up and worldwide on TFC from February 23 to March 15, 2020..

== Plot ==
Mia (Julia Montes) is a night shift security guard in the hospital & pharmaceutical facilities run by the Jacinto family of doctors, and a single mother raising her son Xavier. One epidemic, a hybrid of dengue and malaria are spreading, where casualties are high and vaccines to cure it are not given by the company, for a certain reason. She tries desperately to beg her boss a dose, but declined. She stole a case full, but costed her life when Franco killed her in a market. The medicine works, but she died nonetheless. Her son was cured, and he becomes a poster boy for his mother's deed. Xavier is a scientist and inventor in 2045, creating a holographic stick.

The time would rewound back to 2020 where Mia saw news clips about her death in the mysterious stick. She decides to change the fate, by doing the same thing, but this time, she was more careful. She now tries to find clues about the epidemic, and tries to save as many victims as she could.

== Cast and characters ==
Main cast

- Julia Montes as Mia Narvaez-Agbayani
- Edu Manzano as Claudio S. Jacinto
- Arjo Atayde as Dr. Cedric Jacinto
- JC Santos as Dr. Angelo "Jelo" Pecson
- Pen Medina as Dado Narvaez
- Denise Laurel as Dr. Delilah Gomez
- Joem Bascon as Detective Hector Perez
- Joross Gamboa as Emerson G. Agbayani
- Melissa Ricks as Belinda "Bella" Samonte-Perez

Supporting cast

- Prinz Skie Bautista as Xavier Agbayani
- Eric Fructuoso as Gregorio "Rigor" Baltazar
- Meryll Soriano as Cristina Capili
- Anna Luna as Charlotte Aurelio
- Pepe Herrera as Mario Borja
- Benj Manalo as Santino "Otep" Viray
- Patrick Sugui as Kyle Pecson
- Paeng Sudayan as Luigi Borja
- Alora Sasam as Cynthia Viray

Special Participation

- Amy Austria as Lourdes Jacinto
- Alex Medina as young Dado
- Meg Imperial as Mia’s mother
- McCoy de Leon as Gerard Capili
- Matt Evans as Sebastian "Bogs" Galvez
- Tony Labrusca as Dr. Xavier Agbayani
- Jameson Blake as young Claudio
- Luke Alford as young Cedric
- Myel de Leon as young Mia

== Broadcast ==
The series aired on ABS-CBN's Yes Weekend! Sunday block and worldwide via The Filipino Channel.

From March 15, 2020, production of new episodes were temporarily suspended by the enhanced community quarantine in Luzon put in place because of the COVID-19 pandemic in the Philippines, the show was put on hiatus and temporarily replaced by reruns of Wansapanataym in its timeslot until the closure of ABS-CBN's free-to-air network (Channel 2) on May 5, 2020 due to the cease and desist order issued by the National Telecommunications Commission on account of its franchise expiration.

The show was later cancelled on May 6, 2020 due to the cease and desist order issued by the National Telecommunications Commission on account of its franchise expiration

== Reception ==
Kantar Media National TV Ratings (7:00PM PST)
Pilot Episode	Finale Episode	Peak	Average
27.0% February 23, 2020	27.7% March 15, 2020	27.7% March 15, 2020	27.0%

== See also ==
- List of Kapamilya Channel original programming
- List of programs broadcast by ABS-CBN
- List of ABS-CBN Studios original drama series
