= Halik sa Hangin =

- Theatrical release poster
- Directed by: Emmanuel "Manny" Q. Palo
- Written by: Enrico C. Santos; Patrick John R. Valencia
- Produced by: Charo Santos-Concio; Malou N. Santos
- Starring: Gerald Anderson; Julia Montes; JC de Vera
- Cinematography: Moises Zee
- Edited by: Beng Bandong
- Music by: Francis S. Concio
- Production companies: ABS-CBN Film Productions; Cinemedia
- Distributed by: Star Cinema
- Release date: January 28, 2015
- Running time: 110 minutes
- Country: Philippines
- Language: Filipino
- Box office: ₱28 million

Halik sa Hangin (lit. 'Kiss in the Wind') is a 2015 Filipino romantic horror and psychological thriller film, directed by Emmanuel Q. Palo and written by Enrico Santos. It stars Gerald Anderson, Julia Montes, and JC de Vera. This was Edu Manzano's first film appearance after his special participation role in the 2003 hit comedy film Ang Tanging Ina. The film was released on January 28, 2015, in the Philippines.

The film deals with a young woman who is brought to Baguio by her new stepfather. While she struggles with her new family and surroundings, she finds herself torn between two young men who bring passion into her life.

== Plot ==
Mia struggles to adjust to a new life in Baguio with her mother Teresa, her stepfather John, and her half-brother Sam, and harbors a lingering resentment over the death of her biological father Rene. Despite John's misgivings, Mia secretly brings home a guitar from an abandoned house. Shortly afterwards, she attends a party at the Diplomat Hotel and meets Gio, a mysterious young man consistently dressed in the same outfit. Mia and Gio fall in love with each other, with Gio teaching her how to play the guitar in a park with a young girl named Pauline and Mia subsequently waking up with roses all over her bed. Gio also helps Mia overcome her traumas from witnessing her father's death and defends her from a group of bullies led by Wilmer. However, Gio strongly resists having his picture uploaded by Mia on social media.

When Wilmer commits dies in bizarre circumstances following his encounter with Gio, Mia's family and friends question her over her involvement, noting that Wilmer committed suicide using Mia's cutter. When Mia explains that she was with Gio the entire time, she is told that she never seen with another person the entire time she was with Gio and was seen talking to herself, with all other evidence of their relationship proven to be illusory. A desperate Mia convinces her group to accompany her to the park where she meets with Gio, only to stumble upon a cemetery containing Pauline's grave. As Mia's sanity is questioned, she reconciles with Teresa when she clarifies the circumstances that led to her separation from Rene.

Mia later encounters Gio and chastises him for being untruthful to her. Gio then dares her to meet his family. That night, Mia arrives at Gio's house to meet with his family, only to be met coolly by them. Gio and his family then reveal themselves as ghosts, prompting Mia to flee in terror. The next day, Mia confronts Gio at the cemetery for haunting her, but Gio demands that she join him in the afterlife and threatens to kill those closest to her, starting with her best friend Alvin. Mia and Alvin then meet Quinn, a nun who was Gio's previous girlfriend, who tells them that Gio had a turbulent family background that led him to commit suicide, and that Quinn's failure to join him in a suicide pact is what pushes Gio to haunt the living.

As Mia and Alvin try to protect her family from Gio's wrath, John tries to destroy the guitar, which turns out to have belonged to Gio, but has his hand burned by an angry Gio, who manifests himself as a poltergeist. When Gio threatens Sam, Mia reluctantly agrees to join Gio into the afterlife and goes with him to the Diplomat Hotel. Fr. Abellera, Mia's spiritual advisor, deduces that the only way for the hauntings to be stopped is for Gio's ashes to be blessed and goes to Gio's house with Sam. Meanwhile, Alvin follows Mia to the Diplomat Hotel while Mia reasons with Gio. Alvin tries to exorcise Gio, but the latter partially possesses Alvin and leads him to self-harm while Fr. Abellera and Sam are tormented by the ghosts of Gio's family. In tears, Mia agrees to die on condition that her loved ones will not be harmed, and jumps off a ledge. However, Sam manages to bless Gio's ashes in time, and Gio catches Mia before she falls further. Gio tells Mia he loves her before they share one final kiss as he departs to the afterlife, finally at peace.

Some time later, a garage sale is being held for Gio's old things. A woman picks up Gio's guitar and starts to play it, only for a string to break and blood to appear on her face.

== Cast ==
- Gerald Anderson as Gio Magno M. Brauner
- Julia Montes as Mia Generoso
- JC de Vera as Alvin Paredes
- Edu Manzano as John
- Ina Raymundo as Teresa
- Jett Pangan as Rene
- Jasmine Curtis Smith as Quinn Zobrado
- Boboy Garovillo as Fr. Abellera
- Yayo Aguila as Inang
- Miles Ocampo as Camille
- Miguel Vergara as Sam
- Jonicka Cyleen Movido as Pauline
- Minnie Aguilar as Yaya Jeng
- Markki Stroem as Edsel
- Devon Seron as Debbie
- Maris Racal as Tetay
- Fifth Solomon as Louie
- Fourth Solomon as Lester
- Alex Diaz as Wilmer
- Marnie Lapus as Dra. Sibeles
- Joe Gruta as Mang Bert
- Mimi Orara as Sister Carmi

== Production ==
=== Filming ===
It is set and filmed in Baguio. According to director Emmanuel Quindo Palo in picking Baguio as the movie's setting, he describes Baguio as overpopulated but no one can ever question the city's picturesque landscape which serves as an eye-candy for those watching the film. Several scenes from the film were also shot in a 1930s abandoned American house and at the supposedly haunted Diplomat Hotel, both located in Baguio.

== Reception ==
=== Critical response ===
The Filipino Scribe gave the film a rate of 3.5 out of 5.0 praising Manzano and Raymundo for their performances, saying, “Edu Manzano and Ina Raymundo only had limited exposure in the movie, but they portrayed their respective roles as a loving mom and a strict but perpetually-concerned stepfather rather convincingly.”

Jocelyn Valle of PEP.ph commended Montes' performance, stating, "Julia, the actress, shows great commitment and earnestness in playing the character of Mia. She makes the viewer feel Mia’s emotional stages of entering into the territory of romantic love — apprehension, excitement, caution, bliss — until reality bites. She shines the brightest in the pivotal scene where Mia is suspected to becoming a mental case, and Mia has to convince everybody that she’s telling the truth."

=== Accolades ===
Association	Category	Recipient(s) and nominee(s)	Result	Ref.
Young Critics Circle	Best Performance	Julia Montes	Nominated	
Young Critics Circle	Best Achievement in Cinematography and Visual Design	Moises Zee and Manny Morfe	Nominated	
Young Critics Circle	Best Achievement in Editing	Beng Bandong	Nominated	
Young Critics Circle	Best Achievement in Sound and Aural Orchestration	Addiss Tabong and Francis Concio	Nominated	

== See also ==
- List of ghost films
