= Padre de Familia (film) =

- Theatrical release poster
- Directed by: Adolfo Alix Jr.
- Screenplay by: Nikki Bunquin; Jerry Gracio
- Story by: Ralston Jover; Adolfo Alix Jr.
- Produced by: Rodel Nacianceno
- Starring: Nora Aunor; Coco Martin
- Cinematography: Albert Banzon
- Edited by: Renewin Alano; Benjamin Tolentino
- Music by: Von de Guzman
- Production company: CCM Creatives
- Distributed by: Star Cinema
- Release date: February 20, 2016
- Running time: 96 minutes
- Country: Philippines
- Languages: Filipino; English

Padre de Familia is a 2016 independent family drama film, starring Nora Aunor and Coco Martin. The film was premiered at selected cinemas in Europe and the Middle East.

== Plot ==
The film starts with Noel (Coco Martin) leaving for Malaysia as an OFW, he lands a job as a taxi driver and meets a woman named Pia (Julia Montes), who was crying as she rode the cab. Meanwhile, in the Philippines, Noel's mother, Aida (Nora Aunor) is receiving his remittances and gifts so she could take care of his siblings (Miles Ocampo and Manuel Chua), and the extended family like his hot-headed aunt Ramona (Rosanna Roces) and his grandmother (Anita Linda).

Pia rides Noel's cab for the second time and he discovers that she is from the Philippines like him. The two start dating after seeing each other more from then. He tells her about his father who also worked as an OFW but never returned, pushing him to work abroad as the new breadwinner of the family. Later on, she tells Noel that she has a partner and a child back home, which Noel didn't seem to mind.

Aida receives a letter which she appeared not to expect getting. After receiving it, she starts shopping for new clothes and grooming herself. She also meets Job (Joem Bascon), a much younger guy who works at the market and falls in love with him. The conflict began when Aida decided to take Job to be her partner, and took the young man to live with the entire family – much to the dismay of Ramona.

The plot thickens when Pia decides to leave Noel and go back to the Philippines after her work contract in Malaysia ended. Noel also went home one day and gets furious upon finding out that his mother is cheating on his father with a younger man. The content of the letter Aida received was revealed when she responded to her son's anger. They find out that Ben (Joel Torre) is alive, so Noel went to where his father was and took him home. He also searched for Pia and found out that her husband Raymond (Baron Geisler) is abusive, so he makes an effort to take her away from him. However, the husband finds out and beats him up.

Later on, Ramona learns that Aida has not been paying the bills to get their house back after it had been mortgaged. This results to a feud that gives the grandmother a heart attack, eventually killing her. Ben tells the family that the money Noel has been giving to Aida went to his medication and new family, and that she was not spending it for Job. Noel and his mother sort things out right before Raymond set their house on fire.

The story ends with Noel and his family, finally together with Pia and her child in a new house, with Noel getting ready to go back to Malaysia once again to work and support them financially.

== Cast ==
- Nora Aunor as Aida Santiago
- Coco Martin as Noel Santiago
- Julia Montes as Pia
- Joel Torre as Ben Santiago
- Rosanna Roces as Ramona Santiago
- Joem Bascon as Job
- Baron Geisler as Raymond
- Anita Linda as Lola Eva
- Miles Ocampo as Tana Santiago
- Manuel Chua as Caloy Santiago
- Jess Mendoza as Tana's boyfriend
- Paolo Diangson as Noel's son
- Janvier Daily as Matador
- Sunshine Teodoro as Saleswoman
- Armand Reyes as Ben's neighbor
- Malou Crisologo as Debt collector

== Production ==
=== Casting ===
The film was first announced in January 2014 and production began that same month.

The film was based on a concept by Coco Martin who drew from his experiences as an OFW in Canada. Nora Aunor was the first and original choice to play the lead actress alongside Martin. She initially had to beg off the project due to being busy with other projects.

With the film's release then uncertain, the concept was turned into a teleserye which necessitated a change in the female lead to co-star with Martin. Judy Ann Santos was approached to be Martin's leading lady. Santos, however, turned down the offer due to unexpected pregnancy. Sarah Geronimo was also approached for the role of leading lady but also had to turn down the offer due to scheduling conflicts. Martin also ended up being busy with his teleserye, Ang Probinsyano.

The proposed teleserye, On the Wings of Love starring James Reid and Nadine Lustre, aired on ABS-CBN and wrapped up around the same time that Padre de Familia was released in theaters.

Martin would again draw inspiration from his experience as an OFW for his 2022 Metro Manila Film Festival entry, Labyu with an Accent, co-starring Jodi Sta. Maria.

=== Release ===
The film was released in the Middle East and Europe through TFC@theMovies.
