= Way Back Home (2011 film) =

- Theatrical film poster
- Directed by: Jerry Lopez Sineneng
- Screenplay by: Anna Karenina L. Ramos; Vanessa R. Valdez
- Story by: Dang Bagas; Anna Karenina L. Ramos; Vanessa R. Valdez
- Produced by: Charo Santos-Concio; Malou N. Santos
- Starring: Kathryn Bernardo; Julia Montes
- Cinematography: Julius Palomo Villanueva
- Edited by: Marya Ignacio
- Music by: Jessie Lasaten
- Production company: Star Cinema
- Distributed by: Star Cinema
- Release date: August 17, 2011; (Philippines)
- Running time: 120 minutes
- Country: Philippines
- Language: Filipino
- Box office: ₱25.78 million

Way Back Home is a 2011 Filipino family drama film directed by Jerry Lopez Sineneng from a story and screenplay written by Anna Karenina L. Ramos and Vanessa R. Valdez, with Dang Bagas as the co-writer. The film follows the story of two sisters, Ana Bartolome (Kathryn Bernardo) and Jessica Santiago (Julia Montes), who have been separated for twelve years and grew up in two totally different worlds.

Produced and distributed by Star Cinema, the film was theatrically premiered on August 17, 2011.

== Plot ==
For 12 years, Jessica Santiago (Julia Montes) has been dealing with the pain and guilt of losing her sister Joanna. Despite her efforts to please her mother Amy (Agot Isidro), Jessica knows that the emptiness in her mother's heart can only be filled by Joanna's return. Unbeknownst to the Santiagos, Joanna has lived to become Ana Bartolome (Kathryn Bernardo), the daughter of simple fisher folk (Lotlot De Leon). When Ana is finally found, she tries to reconnect with her family, especially with Jessica. But Ana's return worsens Jessica's feelings of abandonment. Jessica feels less loved by Amy while Ana feels like she has to win Jessica's approval. After growing tensions between the two sisters result in a competition that endangers the life of one, the family is forced to confront the possibility of being torn apart again.

== Production ==
After the success of the television series, Mara Clara (which ended on June 3 2 months later), ABS-CBN decided to launch the lead cast of the series to film, Bernardo and Montes. In February 2011, the cast was announced that the two main characters will be portrayed by Bernardo and Montes and supposedly together with AJ Perez and Albie Casiño. However, on April 17, 2011, Perez died due to a vehicular accident.

The film company then replaced Perez with Sam Concepcion. In June 2011, Casino was originally tied to the film. However, in July, he was pulled out and was replaced by Enrique Gil. According to Star Cinema, the change in the lineup is prompted by their desire to experiment with different combinations for Bernardo and Montes. Casino had initially worked with Bernardo and Montes in Mara Clara.

== Cast and characters ==
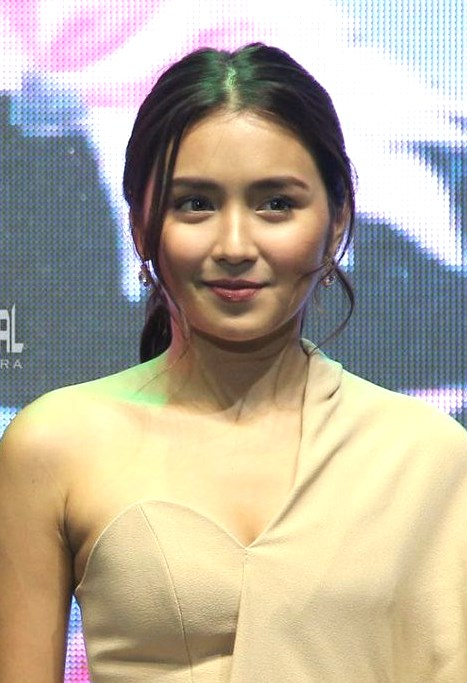
Kathryn Bernardo portrays Ana Bartolome / Joanna Liezl Santiago.

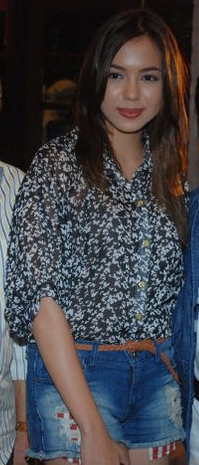
Julia Montes portrays Jessica Lorraine "Jessie" Santiago.

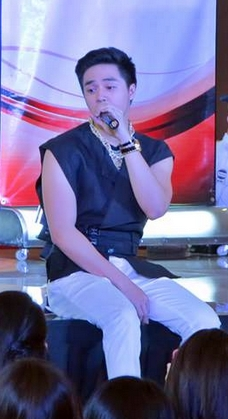
Sam Concepcion portrays Andrew Joseph “AJ” Delgado.

- Kathryn Bernardo as Ana Bartolome / Joanna Liezl Santiago
- Julia Montes as Jessica Lorraine "Jessie" Santiago

=== Supporting cast ===
- Enrique Gil as Michael Estacio
- Sam Concepcion as Andrew Joseph “AJ” Delgado
- Agot Isidro as Amelia "Amy" Santiago
- Tonton Gutierrez as Ariel Santiago
- Lotlot De Leon as Lerma Bartolome
- Clarence Delgado as Buboy Bartolome
- Bella Flores as Lola Nita
- Ahron Villena as Jeffrey Santiago
- Jairus Aquino as Junior Bartolome
- Josh Ivan Morales as Uncle Dado
- Gilleth Sandico as Aunt Tida
- Mickey Ferriols as Bettina
- Kyle Danielle Ocampo as Young Jessica Santiago
- Veyda Inoval as Pochay
- Veronica Louise Bernardo as Young Joanna Santiago
- Cecil Paz as Yaya Minda
- Earl Christian Periquet as Young Jeffrey Santiago
- Ray An Dulay as Berto
- Kristel Fulgar as Froggy/ Luisa Mariquit
- Katrina "Hopia" Legaspi as Yvette

== Reception ==
=== Launch ===
The official poster and promotional photos were released through Star Cinema's official Multiply site. The official cinematic trailer was released on the July 30 episode of the noontime variety show, Happy Yipee Yehey. It was first reported that the soundtrack of the film, "You're My Home" will be covered by Maria Aragon, but later on showed in the film's music video that Angeline Quinto will sing the theme song, which was originally sung by Odette Quesada.

=== Critical response ===
Jonry Mendoza, writing for Philippine Entertainment Portal, quoted the film as a "typical Filipino film" in depictions of a family and gives praise to its direction, cinematography, acting performances, and storytelling, which "brings out one of the best dramatic scenes and emphatic dialogues primarily because relationships within the family can relate to." He also gave a commendation to the story's tension, which would also make it relatable to audiences alike.

=== Box office ===
The film opened at first place with an P18 million within its first week surpassing The Smurfs and Blended in Philippine cinemas, according to Box Office Mojo. On its second week, the film grossed an estimated P4 million, having a total gross receipt of P25.7 million. The film was shown in theaters for only two weeks because of the new Star Cinema film Wedding Tayo, Wedding Hindi.
