= Growing Up (2011 Philippine TV series) =

Philippine television drama series

- Title card
- Genre: Teen drama
- Created by: ABS-CBN Studios
- Written by: Sigfreid Sanchez; Raymond Diamzon; Emille Joson
- Directed by: Lino S. Cayetano
- Starring: Kathryn Bernardo; Julia Montes; Daniel Padilla; Carlos Diego Loyzaga
- Opening theme: "Growing Up" by Yeng Constantino
- Country of origin: Philippines
- Original language: Filipino
- No. of episodes: 24

Production
- Executive producer: Marissa V. Kalaw
- Production locations: Subic; Manila
- Editor: Jeffrey Panillio
- Camera setup: Multi-camera
- Running time: 60 minutes
- Production company: Dreamscape Entertainment Television

Original release
- Network: ABS-CBN
- Release: September 4, 2011 – February 12, 2012

Growing Up is a Philippine television drama series broadcast by ABS-CBN. The series is a revival of a 1997 series of the same name that ran on GMA Network from June 2, 1997 to February 12, 1999. Directed by Lino Cayetano, it stars Kathryn Bernardo, Julia Montes, Diego Loyzaga, and Daniel Padilla. It premiered on September 4, 2011 on the network's Yes Weekend line up. The show concluded on February 12, 2012, with a total of 24 episodes.

The series is streaming online on YouTube.

== Premise ==
Childhood best friends Ella and Tammy rally their group of friends to enter local community contests and win prize money for their beloved teacher, Ms. Lisa Ortega, who is battling a serious illness. As they compete to save her life, the teenagers face their own personal challenges and heartbreaks. Through the highs and lows, this tight-knit barkada learns what it truly means to grow up, transforming their dreams, friendships, and perspective on love.

== Cast and characters ==
Cast

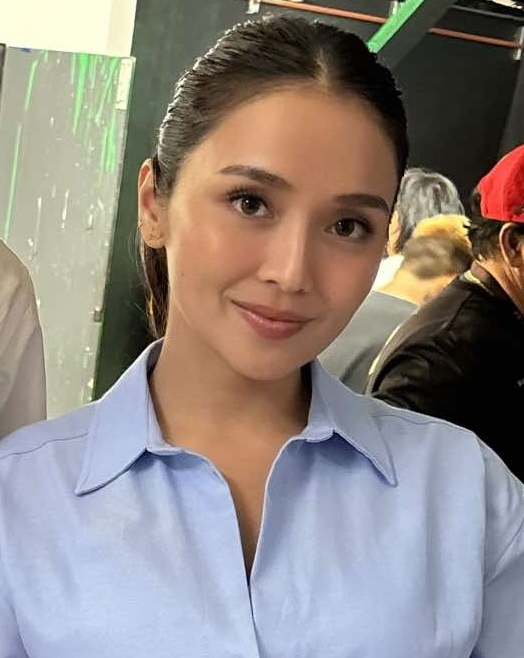
Kathryn Bernardo

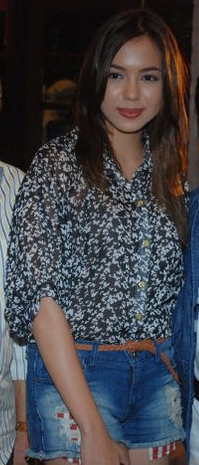
Julia Montes

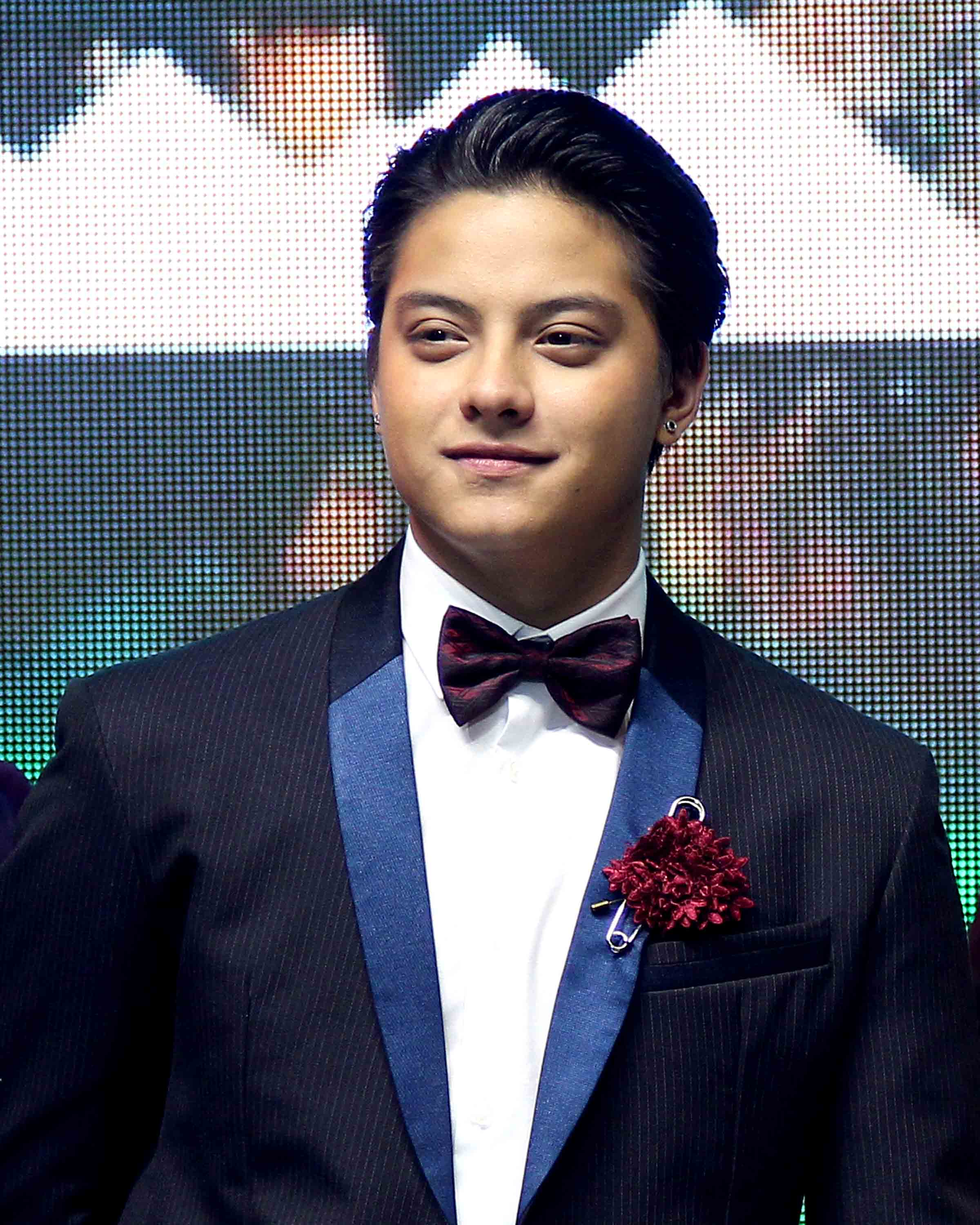
Daniel Padilla

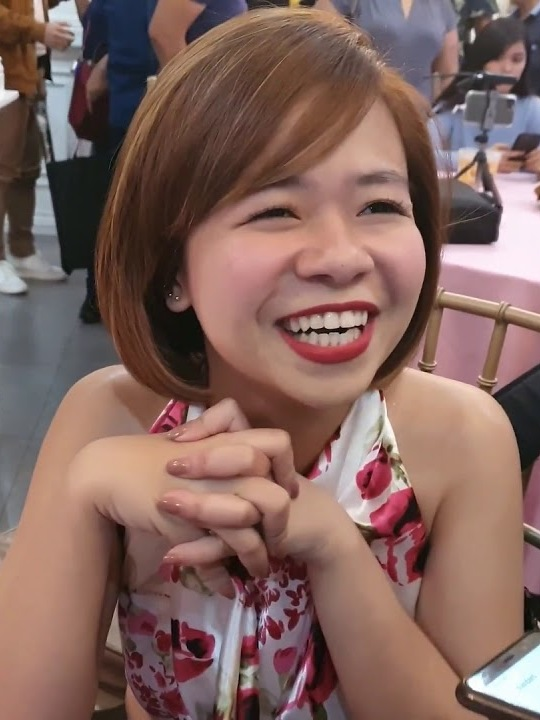
Kiray Celis

Lead cast

- Kathryn Bernardo as Mikaella "Ella" Dimalanta
- Julia Montes as Samantha "Tammy" Magtoto
- Daniel Padilla as Peter Romnick "Patrick" Rivero
- Diego Loyzaga as Ejay Edison "Jason" Rivero

Supporting cast

- Yen Santos as Cassandra "Cassie" Montenegro
- Neil Coleta as Christian Mico "Tikoy" Navarro
- Kiray Celis as Brigette Honey "Britney" Gunay
- EJ Jallorina as William Kingston "Winston" del Rosario
- Maricar Reyes as Lisa Ortega
- Ron Morales as James Reyes
- Angel Jacob as Isabelle Dimalanta
- Jeffrey Santos as Henry
- Jenny Miller as Stella
- Gerald Madrid as John
- Tess Antonio as Mrs. Gunay
- Roden Araneta as Mr. Gunay
- Jong Cuenco as Mr. del Rosario
- Piero Vergara as Richard
- Tippy Dos Santos as Michelle
- Jovit Baldivino as Brando

Special participation

- Coco Martin as Asiong

== Ratings ==
According to Kantar Media/TNS National Household Ratings, the pilot episode of Growing Up earned a 12.3% rating. The final episode based on the overnight ratings of AGB Nielsen Philippines, received a 3.8% rating.
