= Walang Hanggan (2012 TV series) =

2012 Philippine television drama series

- Title card
- Also known as: My Eternal
- Genre: Melodrama; Romance
- Created by: ABS-CBN Studios: Rondel P. Lindayag; Reggie Amigo
- Based on: Hihintayin Kita sa Langit by Carlos Siguion-Reyna; Wuthering Heights by Emily Brontë
- Developed by: ABS-CBN Studios; Roldeo T. Endrinal; Julie Anne R. Benitez
- Written by: Reggie Amigo; Noreen Capili; Mariami Tanangco-Domingo; Mark Anthony Bunda
- Directed by: Jerry Lopez Sineneng; Trina N. Dayrit; Jojo A. Saguin
- Starring: Coco Martin; Julia Montes; Dawn Zulueta; Richard Gomez
- Music by: Carmina Cuya
- Opening theme: "Hanggang sa Dulo ng Walang Hanggan" by Gary Valenciano
- Composer: George Canseco†
- Country of origin: Philippines
- Original language: Filipino
- No. of seasons: 2
- No. of episodes: 203

Production
- Executive producers: Carlo Katigbak; Cory Vidanes; Laurenti Dyogi; Roldeo T. Endrinal†; Rodel Luis Nacianceno
- Production locations: Philippines; Milan, Italy; San Francisco, California, United States
- Cinematography: Ronnie Nadura; Bobby Pintor
- Editors: Renewin Alano; Froilan Francia
- Running time: 45 minutes
- Production companies: Dreamscape Entertainment; CCM Creatives

Original release
- Network: ABS-CBN
- Release: January 16 – October 26, 2012

Walang Hanggan (International title: My Eternal) is a 2012 Philippine television drama romantic series broadcast by ABS-CBN. The series is based on the 1991 Philippine film Hihintayin Kita sa Langit, itself a loose adaptation of English novelist-poet Emily Brontë's 1847 novel Wuthering Heights. Directed by Jerry Lopez Sineneng, Trina N. Dayrit and Jojo A. Saguin, it stars Coco Martin, Julia Montes, Dawn Zulueta and Richard Gomez. It aired on the network's Primetime Bida line up and worldwide on TFC from January 16 to October 26, 2012, replacing Nasaan Ka, Elisa? and was replaced by A Beautiful Affair. The series is streaming online on YouTube.

It became the first primetime series of ABS-CBN to win in its timeslot and lead all Philippine television programs in the national ratings throughout its entire run, airing its finale episode on October 26, 2012 and attaining its highest rating of 45.4% nationwide.

The series was the highest-rated program on the network's primetime block for the period of October 26, 2012 until Juan dela Cruz, also starred by Coco Martin, on February 21, 2013.

== Plot summary ==
Cruz sisters Henya and Margaret live together with Joseph Montenegro in the fictional province of Olivarez. Henya sacrificed everything to give Margaret a better life. Around two decades later, Joseph and Margaret's son Marco Montenegro, the future heir of the Montenegro's wine business, develops feelings for Emily Cardenas, the daughter of an old worker in their hacienda. Marco gives Emily the Infinity Ring, representing "eternity," as a symbol of their love for each other. However, Margaret's schemes to ruin Emily's relationship with Marco prompts him to marry rich banker Jane Bonifacio, much to the detriment of Emily, who throws the ring away and vows revenge against the Montenegros. One night, Margaret and Henya had a heated misunderstanding about Joseph's love for Henya. Henya decides to leave the mansion so Margaret can live in peace.

Years after Joseph's death, laborer William Alcantara settles in Olivarez with his children Katerina, Onat, and Tomas. When Onat died from a deadly flu and the Montenegros migrate to the United States, William adopts a street boy named Daniel into the hacienda Alcantara, where Henya assumes her role as Daniel's adoptive grandmother. Daniel and Katerina become best friends and they gradually develop a very close relationship over the next several years. Tomas remains very resentful towards Daniel and has an addiction to gambling. Margaret, Marco, and Jane return home with their children Nathan and Johanna, who both become interested in Katerina and Daniel respectively. Unknown to everyone else, Emily returns to the country along with her assistant Miguel Ramos, as they begin investigating the Montenegros. After William dies of a severe heart attack, Tomas takes over the hacienda Alcantara with help from Margaret, and he succeeds in destroying Daniel's life. Nathan attends Katerina's college graduation despite not being a student. Meanwhile, Daniel and Henya confront Tomas, who accuses the former of financial theft. In his foolish and crooked anger, Tomas punishes Daniel by dragging him on horseback. Katerina is eventually forced to live with the Montenegros, where Nathan marries Katerina in the process. Daniel is fatally stabbed by Tomas and plunges down into the waterfalls, but is found alive by Emily and Miguel. Upon recovering, Daniel is heartbroken seeing Katerina and Nathan together and he agrees to live with Emily in Milan, Italy in order to become stronger. Emily tells Daniel about her life in Milan and she has flashbacks of working multiple jobs until she married a rich old man named Marcelo Guidotti.

Two years later, Emily and Daniel returns to the Philippines after learning that Nathan and Katerina are going to be married. However, Daniel fails to arrive in time to stop the wedding. The Guidottis eventually open their wine business to plan their own counter-strike against the Montenegros. Johanna learns the truth from Emily that she is adopted. Daniel and Katerina eventually realize that they still have feelings for each other, but Nathan is secretly watching over them. Henya tries to convince Marco and Emily that Daniel is their biological son. DNA testing confirmed positive results; however, due to his growing obsession of Emily, Miguel manipulates the results and secretly allies himself with Margaret. After the truth is eventually revealed, Daniel agrees to live in the Montenegro mansion to spend more time with Marco as his father, and Emily is reluctant to accept it. Margaret orders Miguel to separate Marco and Emily, but takes a nasty turn when Jane is seemingly killed in a plane bombing by Miguel's accomplice David Conde. With Margaret's reluctant help, Miguel manages to steal billions of money from the Guidotti Imports and the Bonifacio Bank to put the families into bankruptcy. Later on, Daniel and Miguel eventually confront each other, but Miguel flees with the money he stole and hides from the authorities. Daniel decides to leave the Montenegro mansion to take care of Emily and Henya.

One year after losing Guidotti Imports, Emily and Daniel work on their own jobs as Tomas and Nathan try to make their lives miserable. Jane's cousin Jean Bonifacio appears and takes over the Bonifacio Bank that figured in the collapse of Guidotti Imports. Under a cover identity named Black Lily, Jean secretly sends flowers and also meddles in Emily and Marco's relationship as the lovers are engaged. Jean has flashbacks that reveals she is actually Jane, who miraculously survived the plane crash and underwent plastic surgery. Tomas becomes the new president of Guidotti Imports by using the money from Miguel, who is driven by his obsession with Emily and continues to threaten Margaret. Katerina continues to suffer a miserable life with Nathan as his insanity gets too far. Daniel and Katerina attempt to elope together, but Katerina gets abducted by Tomas, and as Johanna discovers the hiding place and tells a depressed Nathan about the location, Nathan confronts and rapes Katerina. She becomes pregnant and runs away to hide in a far-off location, prompting Daniel to persevere in finding her. Whilst hiding from Nathan, Daniel and Katerina eventually reunite in the province of Albay and they discover that Katerina's mother Luisa is alive. Marco and Emily make a surprise wedding night, but Jean stops them by unmasking her true identity as Jane. After she grants Marco's request for an annulment, Jane gets kidnapped by Miguel, and as Margaret attempts to rescue her, she failed as Miguel shoots Jane to death. Emily manages to lure Miguel into her trap so the authorities can arrest him. Daniel gets into a heated fistfight with Nathan, who stabs himself to frame up Daniel. To save Katerina and Henya's life from Nathan, Daniel surrenders himself to the police for frustrated murder, and reunites with Miguel in jail. Nathan still threatens Katerina, while Daniel is fatally stabbed by a prison mate hired by Miguel, sending him into a coma.

After recovering at a hospital and was released from prison, Daniel vows to stop Nathan from taking Katerina away from him. A reformed Margaret admits that Katerina and Nathan's marriage is null and void because the wedding priest's license had already expired at the time of the wedding. Daniel finds Nathan and Katerina at the airport, and Johanna tells them the truth about Nathan's fake marriage. Margaret reconciles with Henya before surrendering herself to the police for all her crimes and her alliance with Miguel. Emily and Marco finally get married in the United States, while Miguel fakes his death at the Jones Bridge by getting multiple shots from a sniper by David (under the orders of Tomas) and plunges down into the river. Margaret is finally forgiven by Emily, Marco and Daniel. Nathan tries hard to redeem himself for the better (so he can make Katerina love him again), but Tomas manipulates the whole situation by telling Nathan that Katerina and Daniel are going to be married. More confrontations ensued, Daniel admits that Nathan is the father of Katerina's child, and Katerina explains to everyone how she was raped by Nathan. Marco, Emily and Johanna talks about putting Nathan to a mental hospital, but Nathan overhears them and panics, and as he desperately kidnaps Katerina, Daniel chases after them. An all-out fistfight between Daniel and Nathan results in Katerina suffering a miscarriage. Marco and Emily commit Nathan to a psychiatric hospital, while a mourning Katerina angrily blames Tomas and Nathan for the death of her unborn child. Weeks later, everyone is preparing for Daniel and Katerina's wedding, and Emily learns that the Infinity Ring that Katerina holds for Daniel is the same ring that she had with Marco in the past. Tomas gets banned after a bomb threat in the Montenegro mansion, but Margaret is given a special permit to attend the wedding. Daniel and Katerina are finally married with a grand wedding in Intramuros. At the wedding reception, Margaret announces new positions for the Montenegro Corporation, including Emily as chief operating officer and Daniel as new president of the company. Daniel and Katerina spend their honeymoon at San Francisco. Afterwards, the couple returns home with a brand new wine that will be used in the company's relaunch. Tomas' business becomes bankrupt and Miguel wants his money back, while Daniel comes up with a plan bring down Tomas. In the masquerade ball at Emily's birthday, Daniel gives her mother a surprise gift with the merge of Montenegro Corporation and Guidotti Imports and the return of Infinity Wine to the company, and Tomas gets very enraged at the Montenegros and Katerina. However, everyone realizes that Miguel is still alive.

Daniel eventually face off in a final showdown with Miguel and Tomas, who kidnaps Katerina and Emily respectively. However, Miguel fatally shoots Katerina and Daniel and the couple end up in the hospital, but Marco arrives to rescue Emily and kills Miguel in self-defense. Margaret is freed from jail after Miguel's death. Katerina eventually dies at the hospital, and as Daniel mourns at her grave for so many days, Tomas blames him for his sister's death and kills him, much to the anguish and sadness of Emily and Henya. In the epilogue, the Montenegros now live together in the hacienda Alcantara, where Henya and Margaret are thinking about Daniel and Katerina being reunited in the afterlife. Emily and Marco have another son, named Daniel. Nathan is released from the psychiatric hospital and returns home with his family. Tomas is sentenced to life imprisonment and is visited by Luisa and Johanna. Several years later, new neighbors visit the hacienda Alcantara during a Christmas gathering where the young Daniel meets the couple's daughter named Catherine. The story ends with Daniel and Katerina living happily ever after in Heaven.

== Cast and characters ==
=== Main cast ===
- Coco Martin as Daniel C. Guidotti† (Note: Daniel originally carried the name Daniel Cruz as he was raised by his paternal grandaunt Virginia Cruz.) (Note: Daniel was given the name Daniel Cardenas Guidotti after Emily took him in, have him pose as his son and trained him for his eventual return. At the time Emily petitioned the court for Daniel's reappearance as her son that had gone missing for years and for the concomitant change of his name, Emily was unaware that Daniel is her actual son.) (Note: Daniel is actually Daniel Cardenas Montenegro, however, even after finding out about his true parentage, he still continued using the surname Guidotti. It is also of note that while Marco acknowledged Daniel as his son, the acknowledgment merely gives the acknowledged child the right to use the surname of the putative father under Art. 176 of the Family Code of the Philippines as amended. The usage thereof is only permissive and not mandatory upon the acknowledged child.)
- Julia Montes as Katerina Alcantara-Guidotti† (Note: Katerina was married twice over the course of the series; first to Nathan and then to Daniel. However, her marriage with Nathan was later revealed to be invalid. Katerina’s tombstone is written as Katerina Alcantara-Guidotti at the end of the series.)
- Dawn Zulueta as Emilia "Emily" Cardenas-Guidotti/Montenegro (Note: While Emily and Marco eventually tied the knot at the end of the series, it was not shown that she carried the surname Montenegro in her representations, hence she remains billed under the Guidotti surname.)
- Richard Gomez as Marco Montenegro

=== Supporting cast ===
- Susan Roces as Virginia "Henya" Cruz
- Helen Gamboa as Margaret Cruz-Montenegro
- Paulo Avelino as Nathaniel "Nathan" Montenegro
- Melissa Ricks as Johanna Montenegro / Patricia Bonifacio (Note: The Johanna that Nathan grew up with as his sister is actually Patricia Bonifacio, the illegitimate child of John Bonifacio, whom Marco and Jane took as their own to save Nathan from the trauma caused by the death of his sister Joanne.)
- Joem Bascon as Tomas Alcantara
- Rita Avila / Eula Valdez as Jane Bonifacio-Montenegro / Jean "Black Lily" Bonifacio (Note: After the assassination attempt on her life, Jane Bonifacio underwent plastic surgery and returned under the guise of Jean "Black Lily" Bonifacio.)
- Nonie Buencamino as Miguel Ramos

=== Extended cast ===
- Shamaine Buencamino as Luisa Alcantara
- Ogie Diaz as Kenneth
- Arlene Muhlach as Perla
- John Medina as James Ocampo
- Josh Ivan Morales as David Conde
- Eda Nolan as Lorraine Delgado

=== Guest cast ===
- Richard Yap as Henry de Dios
- Nanding Josef as Ernesto
- Menggie Cobarrubias as John Bonifacio
- Olive Isidro as Edith Bonifacio
- Froilan Sales as Hugo Rivera
- Lui Manansala as Laarni Peralta
- Arvin Gison as Jonathan "Onat" Alcantara
- Fred Payawan as Luis Villareal
- Dino Imperial as Jack
- Ivan Dorschner as Katerina's debut party guest (18 Rose)
- Patrick Sugui as Katerina's debut party guest (18 Rose)
- DM Sevilla as Katerina's debut party guest (18 Rose)
- Maichel Fideles as Katerina's debut party guest
- Marion Gopez as Katerina's debut party guest
- Piero Vergara as Katerina's debut party guest
- Shey Bustamante as Katerina's debut party guest
- Tricia Santos as Katerina's debut party guest and schoolmate
- Manuel Chua as Tomas' friend
- RJ Calipus as Tomas' friend
- Marion dela Cruz as Tomas' friend
- Jef-Henson Dee as Padrino
- Andre Tiangco as Atty. Ronald Meneses
- Apollo Abraham as Benjamin Mercado
- Marnie Lapus as Ms. Mercado
- Alvin Fortuna as NBI agent
- Giovanni Baldisseri as Bida Resureccion
- Pontri Bernardo as Mr. Lim
- Gilleth Sandico as Restaurant manager
- Wendy Valdez as Nathan's prostitute / fake Katerina
- William Lorenzo as Homer Reyes
- Ricardo Cepeda as Atty. Norman
- Dante Rivero as Teban
- Archie Adamos as Domeng
- Tom Olivar as Jail Chief Warden
- PJ Endrinal as Joaquin
- Valerie Concepcion as Wedding planner
- Gary Valenciano as himself (singer for wedding of Daniel and Katerina)
- Bryan Termulo as himself (singer for wedding of Daniel and Katerina)
- Gerard Salonga and the ABS-CBN Philharmonic Orchestra as themselves
- Ateneo Chamber Singers as themselves
- Mon Confiado as Brando
- Maan Pintado as Tina
- Mike Austria as Fidel Gonzales

=== Special participation ===
- Eddie Gutierrez as Joseph Montenegro
- Joel Torre as William Alcantara
- Spanky Manikan as Herman Cardenas
- Yogo Singh as young Daniel
- Dexie Daulat as young Katerina
- Andrei Garcia as young Tomas
- John Vincent Servilla as young Nathan
- Yasmine Andrea Aguinaldo as Joanne Montenegro
- EJ Jallorina as young Kenneth
- Sheryl Cruz as young Henya
- Ciara Sotto as young Margaret
- Melissa Mendez as Hilda Cruz (Henya and Margaret's mother)
- Mark Gil as Mr. Cruz (Henya and Margaret's father)

== Official soundtrack ==
The drama's main theme song "Hanggang Sa Dulo Ng Walang Hanggan", composed by songwriter George Canseco, is performed by Filipino singer Gary Valenciano. The song was originally covered by Richard Reynoso as a theme song for the 1991 film Hihintayin Kita Sa Langit, starring Richard Gomez and Dawn Zulueta. The song was also covered by Zsa-Zsa Padilla and Ayegee Paredes for the 2001 teleserye Sa Dulo ng Walang Hanggan, starring Claudine Barretto, Carlos Agassi, Luis Alandy, Mylene Dizon, and Ms. Gloria Romero

A second album titled Walang Hanggan: The Official Soundtrack Volume 2 was released with new songs including "Pangako" by Martin Nievera, "Sana Maulit Muli" by Ice Seguerra, and "Kahit Isang Saglit" by Juris. Another cover of the drama's theme song is sung by Nina.

Walang Hanggan (Original Motion Picture Soundtrack)

Soundtrack album by various artists
- Released: January 15, 2012
- Recorded: 2012
- Genres: OPM, Pop, Soundtrack
- Length: 49:35
- Language: Filipino
- Label: Star Music
- Producer: ABS-CBN Film Productions, Inc.

OST Volume 1
No.	Title	Performer(s)	Length
1.	"Hanggang Sa Dulo Ng Walang Hanggan"	Gary Valenciano	4:04
2.	"Huwag Ka Lang Mawawala"	Bugoy Drilon and Liezel Garcia	4:13
3.	"Hanggang"	Angeline Quinto	4:04
4.	"Dadalhin"	Bryan Termulo	4:47
5.	"Kailangan Kita"	Jovit Baldivino	3:50
6.	"Ikaw Lang Ang Mamahalin"	Jed Madela	3:48
7.	"Hanggang Sa Dulo Ng Walang Hanggan" (Minus One)	Gary Valenciano	4:04
8.	"Huwag Ka Lang Mawawala" (Minus One)	Bugoy Drilon and Liezel Garcia	4:15
9.	"Hanggang" (Minus One)	Angeline Quinto	4:05
10.	"Dadalhin" (Minus One)	Bryan Termulo	4:49
11.	"Kailangan Kita" (Minus One)	Jovit Baldivino	3:48
12.	"Ikaw Lang Ang Mamahalin" (Minus One)	Jed Madela	3:48
Total length:			49:35

Walang Hanggan, Vol. 2 (Original Motion Picture Soundtrack)

Soundtrack album by various artists
- Released: June 18, 2012
- Recorded: 2012
- Genres: OPM, Pop, Soundtrack
- Length: 53:34
- Language: Filipino
- Label: Star Music
- Producers: ABS-CBN Film Productions, Inc.

OST Volume 2
No.	Title	Performer(s)	Length
1.	"Pangako"	Martin Nievera	4:41
2.	"Sana Maulit Muli"	Aiza Seguerra	5:50
3.	"Iisa Pa Lamang"	Erik Santos	4:02
4.	"Kahit Isang Saglit"	Juris	4:46
5.	"Gaano Kadalas Ang Minsan"	Christian Bautista	4:09
6.	"Hanggang Sa Dulo Ng Walang Hanggan"	Nina	3:20
7.	"Pangako" (Minus One)	Martin Nievera	4:41
8.	"Sana Maulit Muli" (Minus One)	Aiza Seguerra	5:50
9.	"Iisa Pa Lamang" (Minus One)	Erik Santos	4:02
10.	"Kahit Isang Saglit" (Minus One)	Juris	4:46
11.	"Gaano Kadalas Ang Minsan" (Minus One)	Christian Bautista	4:07
12.	"Hanggang Sa Dulo Ng Walang Hanggan" (Minus One)	Nina	3:18
Total length:			53:34

Insert songs also include "Natutulog Ba Ang Diyos?" by Gary Valenciano (from the 2008 album Rebirth) and "Kastilyong Buhangin" by Regine Velasquez (from the 1991 album Tagala Talaga). For the final ten episodes, unreleased songs include the orchestral versions of "Dadalhin" by Bryan Termulo and "Hanggang Sa Dulo Ng Walang Hanggan" by Gary Valenciano, both arranged by the ABS-CBN Philharmonic Orchestra and the Ateneo Chamber Singers.

== Production ==
=== Marketing ===
The first full-length trailer was released on December 17, 2011, via the drama-anthology Maalaala Mo Kaya.

From January 9 to 13, 2012, the cast members of the series appeared via the morning talk show Kris TV where they promoted the series. First to make an appearance were Richard Gomez and Dawn Zulueta, followed by the artists of the Walang Hanggan: The Official Soundtrack album. On January 11, Julia Montes, Melissa Ricks, Joem Bascon and Paulo Avelino promoted their latest drama. This was followed by a guest appearance of Helen Gamboa and Susan Roces on January 12. By January 13, Coco Martin, the series' lead actor who coincidentally is the talk show's most requested guest, gave a special appearance.

Gomez once again promoted the series by guesting in the noontime variety show Happy Yipee Yehey! on January 14, the same day of the series' advanced special screening held at SM Megamall, the screening was attended by many acclaimed artists and critics namely Gomez' wife Lucy Torres with Kris Aquino, Vice Ganda and Liz Uy. Also present in the said screening was My Binondo Girl's Richard Yap, Zulueta's husband Cong. Anton Lagdameo, and Garrie Concepcion.

A thanksgiving concert entitled "Walang Hanggang Pasasalamat" was staged on October 21, 2012, at the Araneta Coliseum. The said concert was also broadcast live on the same date on ABS-CBN's Sunday Best. The concert coincided with the show's final week on the air.

=== Merchandising ===
ABS-CBN took advantage of the drama's popularity to partner with local jeweler Karat World to produce an "infinity ring," a special ring shaped like intertwined infinity loops. The rings are available in 14-karat solid yellow gold, 14-karat solid white gold, and silver 925. Each ring also has an "infinity marking" and a 585-stamping "to signify its gold purity." They also released infinity necklaces and earrings.

=== Reruns ===
Reruns of Walang Hanggan are broadcast through Jeepney TV. On March 18, 2020, Dreamscape Entertainment announced that Walang Hanggan will have a rerun beginning March 23, 2020, on ABS-CBN's Kapamilya Gold afternoon block, weekdays at 2:30pm. It was a part of ABS-CBN's temporary programming changes due to the enhanced community quarantine done to lower the spread of the COVID-19 pandemic in the Philippines, which made the network suspend the taping of its series.

However, this rerun abruptly ended after the National Telecommunications Commission issued a cease and desist order against ABS-CBN due to expired broadcast franchise.

== Reception ==
=== Ratings ===
The series' premiere night drew with a 32.1% rating in its timeslot. The drama become the most talked-about topic online. According to a release from Kantar Media-TNS data, Walang Hanggan is the only Filipino drama of 2012 to have surpassed the 40% margin, registering a 41% ratings share on May 23, followed by 41.4% on June 15, and 44.7% on June 29. The series finale episode on October 26, 2012 drew a 45.4% nationwide audience share, becoming the country's second highest-rated final episode of all time since Philippine television switched to a nationwide TV ratings system in 2009.

Kantar Media National TV Ratings (8:15 PM PST)
Pilot Episode	Finale Episode	Peak	Average
32.1% January 16, 2012	45.4% October 26, 2012	45.4% October 26, 2012	38.4%

=== Awards and nominations ===
Year	Association	Category	Recipient(s) and nominee(s)	Result
2012	26th PMPC Star Awards for Television	Best Drama Actress	Helen Gamboa	Won
2013	44th GMMSF Box-Office Entertainment Awards	Prince of Philippine Television	Coco Martin	Won
2013	44th GMMSF Box-Office Entertainment Awards	Princess of Philippine Television	Julia Montes	Won
2013	44th GMMSF Box-Office Entertainment Awards	All Time Favorite Love Team on Movies and TV	Richard Gomez and Dawn Zulueta	Won
2013	44th GMMSF Box-Office Entertainment Awards	Most Popular Primetime TV Drama Series	Walang Hanggan	Won
2013	Golden Screen TV Awards	Outstanding Original Drama Series	Walang Hanggan	Won
2013	Golden Screen TV Awards	Outstanding Supporting Actor in a Drama Series	Paulo Avelino	Won
2013	Golden Screen TV Awards	Outstanding Supporting Actress in a Drama Series	Helen Gamboa	Won

== See also ==
- List of programs broadcast by ABS-CBN
- List of ABS-CBN Studios original drama series
- List of Wuthering Heights adaptations
- Hihintayin Kita sa Langit
- The Promise
