= 2010 in Philippine music =

The following is a list of notable events that are related to Philippine music in 2010.

== Events ==
=== January ===
- January 30 - The Pinoy Hiphoppaz Organization was launched.

=== February ===
- February 11 - David Benoit performed at PICC.
- February 14 - Raymond Lauchengco and sister Menchu Lauchengco-Yulo performed at Rockwell Tent.
- February 28 - Callalily held grand fans day.

=== July ===
- July 8 - Usher performed at SM Mall of Asia Concert Grounds.

== Debuts ==
=== Soloist ===
- Aljur Abrenica (GMA/Sony)
- Joanna Ampil (Sony)
- Sherwin Baguion (Star Music/Sony)
- Jovit Baldivino (Star Music/Sony)
- Juris Fernandez (Star Music)
- Markki Stroem (Star Music/Sony)

=== Bands/groups ===
- 100 Percent
- Eevee (Sony)
- Eurasia (Viva)
- Ezra Band (Star Music/Sony)
- General Luna (Warner)
- Kiss Jane (Sony)
- VoizBoys (Quantum Music/Star Music)
- XLR8 (Viva/P-Pop)
- The Zion Band

== Reunion/comebacks ==
- Rachel Alejandro
- Brownman Revival
- Ely Buendia
- Gabby Concepcion
- KC Concepcion
- Amber Davis
- Bugoy Drilon
- Nikki Gil
- Toni Gonzaga
- Letter Day Story
- Martin Nievera
- Imelda Papin
- Aiza Seguerra
- Jay R
- Viktoria

== Disbandment ==
- Apo Hiking Society
- Bloomfields

== Albums released ==
Date released	Title	Artist(s)	Label(s)	Source
January 10	Unforgettable	Gabby Concepcion	Warner Music Philippines	
February 10	Now Playing	Juris Fernandez	Star Music	
February 21	Try Love	Joanna Ampil	Sony Music	
March	XLR8	XLR8	Viva Records	
March 9	Eto Pa!	Brownman Revival	Sony Music	
April	Aljur Abrenica	Aljur Abrenica	GMA Records/Sony Music	
May	In Love and War	Francis Magalona and Ely Buendia	Sony Music	
June	Paramdam	Eevee	Sony Music	
June	Sama-Sama	Letter Day Story	Sony Music	
July	Faithfully	Jovit Baldivino	Star Music/Sony Music	
July	Pinoy You Got It!	Sherwin Baguion, The Ezra Band and Markki Stroem	Star Music/Sony Music	
July 16	All Me	Toni Gonzaga	Star Music	
September	Christine	Cristine Reyes	Viva Records	
November 30	Private Affair	Kyla	PolyEast Records	
December 8	Inside My Heart	Frencheska Farr	GMA Records	
