= Renee dela Rosa =

Filipino singer-songwriter (1959–2021)

- Also known as: Alon
- Born: September 24, 1959
- Died: September 15, 2021 (aged 61) Quezon City, Philippines
- Genres: Pop (OPM)
- Instrument: Vocals
- Formerly of: Alon (band)

Renee "Alon" dela Rosa was a Filipino singer-songwriter who is best known for his rendition of the song "Pusong Bato".

== Early life ==
Born September 24, 1959, Renee dela Rosa discovered his passion for singing when he was nine years old. He and his uncle would often join amateur singing competitions. Dela Rosa would later learn to compose his own songs.

== Background ==
Renee dela Rosa wrote the song "Pusong Bato" in 2002. Singer Aimee Torres released a performance of the song in album a year later, saying that the rights for the song were bought by her father Manuel S. Torres within the same year. Both Torres and dela Rosa re-released the song in 2012. Pilipinas Got Talent winner Jovit Baldivino also released a performance of the song which was included as part of the Juan dela Cruz soundtrack.

He was part of the Alon band.

== Death ==
Dela Rosa died on September 15, 2021, nine days before his 62nd birthday, at the Bernardino General Hospital in Quezon City amidst the COVID-19 pandemic. While dela Rosa himself tested negative for COVID-19, the lack of available hospital willing to admit him aggravated his situation.

== Personal life ==
Dela Rosa was a devotee of the Black Nazarene and attributed the resurgence of his song "Pusong Bato" in the 2010s, to a prayer he made to the image in 2011.

Dela Rosa was married to Racquel Hernandez, who was his second wife. His relationship with his first wife ended after he learned that she has cheated him. His breakup with his first wife, also inspired him to compose "Pusong Bato".
