= Pusong Bato =

2003 song by singer Aimee Torres

Single by Aimee Torres

from the album The Original Pusong Bato
- Released: November 5, 2013
- Recorded: July 15, 2003
- Genre: OPM
- Length: 3:31
- Label: Star Music
- Songwriter: Renee dela Rosa

"Pusong Bato"

Single by Alon

from the album Pusong Bato
- Released: 2012
- Recorded: 2012
- Genre: OPM
- Length: 3:26
- Label: Alpha Music Philippines
- Songwriter: Renee dela Rosa

"Pusong Bato"

Single by Jovit Baldivino

from the album Juan dela Cruz Official Soundtrack
- Released: February 4, 2013
- Genre: OPM
- Length: 3:31
- Label: Star Music
- Songwriter: Renee dela Rosa
- Producer: Star Records

Jovit Baldivino singles chronology
"Ika'y Mahal Pa Rin" (2012)	"Pusong Bato" (2013)	"Sana'y Magbalik" (2013)

"Pusong Bato" (lit. 'Heart of Stone') is a single originally released by Filipino singer Aimee Torres, in 2003. After becoming a viral hit, the record was re-released by Star Records in 2013 on the album The Original Pusong Bato, as well as on the official soundtrack to the Filipino television series Juan dela Cruz.

== Background ==
"Pusong Bato" was originally composed by Renee dela Rosa in 2002. Dela Rosa's break-up with his first wife, inspired him to write the song. According to Aimee Torres, her father bought rights to the song in 2003, before releasing a performance of the song as part of her album in the same year.

After it became known, the song's composer, Renee de la Rosa, along with his band, Alon, released their own version of the song in 2012. It was included on the band's album Pusong Bato.

== Performances ==
The single resurfaced when Angelito Paudan uploaded Lexter Jimenez's version of the single on YouTube (it was recorded while Lexter was singing on videoke), and it became popular. The video showed Nigerian Maritime students at the University of Cebu singing the song. According to their professors, the students were taught the song so that they could build a rapport with the locals. Not long after, several versions of the song in different local languages, such as Cebuano, Ilocano, and Kapampangan were circulating on YouTube. The Kulaog Band, along with their two music video parodies, the beki (gay) and reggae versions, were also featured in a magazine show, Kapuso Mo, Jessica Soho.

Several artists have also performed the song, including international Filipino singer Jake Zyrus during his guest appearance on Kris TV, actor Jericho Rosales on It's Showtime, and Jed Madela.

== In other media ==
In 2013, Pilipinas Got Talent's Season 1 winner Jovit Baldivino recorded the song, which was then used as a sub-theme song for the ABS-CBN series, Juan dela Cruz.
