= Juan dela Cruz (TV series) =

- Title card
- Genre: Action; Drama; Fantasy; Horror; Comedy
- Created by: ABS-CBN Studios; Julie Anne R. Benitez; Ethel M. Espiritu; Dindo Perez; Shugo Praico; Lino Cayetano
- Developed by: ABS-CBN Studios; Rondel P. Lindayag; Lino S. Cayetano
- Written by: Dindo Perez; Shugo Praico
- Directed by: Malu L. Sevilla; Avel E. Sunpongco; Jojo A. Saguin; Darnel Joy R. Villaflor; Francis E. Pasion
- Creative director: Ariel Camacho
- Starring: Coco Martin
- Opening theme: "Maging Sino Ka Man" by Martin Nievera
- Ending theme: "Sa Isang Sulyap Mo" by George Tagle
- Country of origin: Philippines
- Original language: Tagalog
- No. of episodes: 188 (list of episodes)

Production
- Executive producers: Roldeo T. Endrinal; Eileen Angela T. Garcia; Myra Afable-Chavez
- Producer: Jimmy Dasal
- Production locations: Quiapo, Manila; Ermita, Manila; Quezon City; Pakil, Laguna
- Editor: Renewin Alano
- Running time: 30-45 minutes
- Production companies: Dreamscape Entertainment Television; CCM Creatives

Original release
- Network: ABS-CBN
- Release: February 4 – October 25, 2013

Related
- My Little Juan

Juan dela Cruz is a 2013 Philippine television drama series broadcast by ABS-CBN. Directed by Malu L. Sevilla, Avel E. Sunpongco, Francis E. Pasion, Jojo A. Saguin, and Darnel Joy R. Villaflor, it stars Coco Martin in the title role. It aired on the network's Primetime Bida line up and worldwide on TFC from February 4 to October 25, 2013, replacing Princess and I and was replaced by Honesto.

It starred Coco Martin as Juan dela Cruz, a half-tagabantay and half-aswang who was trained to become the next Tagabantay and serves as a hero to protect the people from aswangs. It was the fifth television drama in the Philippines made by ABS-CBN Studios to be filmed in high definition.

== Plot ==
The Tagabantay (Guardian) is a hero coming from an ancient lineage of defenders using the Bakal na Krus (Iron Cross) to protect the humans from the Aswang, who are strange creatures that appear as ordinary people to hide their real identities; they spread evil, kill, and eat people. The Bakal na Krus transforms into five weapons, namely: Espada ng Katapangan (Sword of Bravery), Pana ng Karunungan (Bow of Wisdom), Latigo ng Katarungan (Whip of Justice), Sibat ng Kagitingan (Spear of Valor), and the Kalasag ng Anking Galing (Shield of Aptitude).

The Aswangs and Tagabantay are mortal enemies. The story begins when Samuel Alejandro (Albert Martinez), the Haring Aswang (King Aswang), plans to make Amelia (Mylene Dizon), a Tagabantay, fall for him so he could kill her and finally provide triumph for his race. However, he falls in love with her as well, betraying his entire race. Upon knowing his secret, Amelia and Samuel try to kill each other but Samuel chooses to escape instead of killing her—even if that’s what he should do as an Aswang.

=== Bakal na Krus and The Kapatiran ===
At 20, he successfully reclaims the Bakal na Krus from the thief, but was still unaware of its use and why it must belong to him. Eventually, Juan turns into a vigilant who seeks to help people in need. Soon, Juan later joins the Kapatiran (Brotherhood), a group composed of people with personal vendettas who seek to destroy the Aswangs. They have been spending years finding and seeking help from the Tagabantay they know, Julian (Eddie Garcia), who is Amelia’s father and Juan’s grandfather. Julian was actually imprisoned for killing Aswangs which the police thought were people.

One day, Juan accidentally manages to transform the Cross into a sword, making the Kapatiran convinced that he is the present-day Tagabantay for transforming the Cross into weapons only runs in their blood. The group, led by its leader Mang Pepe (Joel Torre), guides and helps train Juan into becoming the next Tagabantay. He also teaches Juan everything that he should know about the war’s history, his duty as a hero, and most importantly, the Haring Aswang—their biggest enemy. Things did not become easy, for Juan constantly shows his mischievous, immature, and unruly behaviour.

=== Rosario ===
While performing his duties as a protector, he falls in love with a 21-year old beautiful woman named Rosario (Erich Gonzales), the same girl he met when he was young. With Rosario, friendship and courtship are very difficult for Juan as he always ends up lying and keeping secrets from her to protect her from his enemies. She is actually the daughter of Kapatiran leader Mang Pepe, whose wife was killed by Juan’s father, Samuel.

=== The Anak ng Dilim ===
After a few weeks, Julian, Juan’s grandfather, escapes from prison to warn Amelia about the new prophecy—the Anak ng Dilim (Son of Darkness) who is set to be the most powerful Aswang to rule the people and the planet and destroy the Tagabantay. Upon returning, Julian finds out that Amelia has died but has a son. He then seeks for his grandson and finds Juan. He introduces himself to him as “Brother Jules”, and secretly watches over Juan in his responsibility as a Tagabantay.

Eventually, Samuel and Juan meet without knowing their real connection. Knowing that Juan is the vigilant who has excellent skills in warfare, Samuel aims to gain Juan’s trust and to make him join the Aswangs, as he believes that Juan’s skills could be useful to their war with the Kapatiran and Tagabantay. Sooner, Samuel learns to treat Juan as his own son. Similarly, Juan becomes closer to him and treats Samuel as his own father, as he has been longing to find his real father for several years.

Samuel has started his own family shortly after leaving Amelia. He lives with Laura (Zsa Zsa Padilla), the Reynang Aswang (Aswang Queen) and their son, Kael (Arron Villaflor) who also happens to be Juan’s rival with Rosario. Moreover, Samuel has been preparing Kael for 20 years, as the prophecy states that the Anak ng Dilim is the Haring Aswang’s son: the Aswang Prince. It is revealed that, the Anak ng Dilim’s great power will emerge when he turns 21.

Finally knowing about the prophecy, the Kapatiran, together with Julian’s guidance, soon start preparing Juan for a huge battle with the Haring Aswang and Anak ng Dilim. When Juan turns 21, everything changed.

The plot twists as it turns out that the prophesied Anak ng Dilim is not Kael, but is actually the eldest son of the Haring Aswang—Juan.

=== Juan's fate ===
Juan Dela Cruz is a half-Tagabantay and a half-Aswang. He inherited the Bakal na Krus from his mother to protect the humans from the Aswangs and spread peace, justice, and to fulfil his biggest mission—to kill the Haring Aswang and the prophesied Anak ng Dilim. However, since Juan is the eldest son of the Aswang King, he himself is the prophesied Anak ng Dilim, the most powerful Aswang which is set to rule over the entire planet, create the Tatlong Araw ng Kadiliman (Three Days of Darkness), and destroy his mortal enemy: the Tagabantay—which also happens to be him.

When the truth about Juan’s identity is revealed, difficult choices were made.

All of them are not victims of love; they are victims of fate.

== Cast and characters ==
Protagonist

- Coco Martin as Juan Dela Cruz / Anak ng Dilim

Main cast

- Erich Gonzales as Rosario Galang-Dela Cruz / Rosario Guerrero
- Albert Martinez as Samuel Alejandro
- Joel Torre as Jose "Pepe" Guerrero
- Arron Villaflor as PS/Insp. Mikael "Kael" Reyes
- Zsa Zsa Padilla as Laura Reyes-Alejandro

Supporting cast

- Gina Pareño as Belen Gonzales
- Neil Coleta as Asiong Baltazar
- Lotlot de Leon as Cora Galang
- Louise Abuel as Pikoy Baltazar
- John Medina as Agustin Magdiwang
- Shaina Magdayao as Prinsesa Mira
- Diana Zubiri as Peru-ha / Saragnayan
- Eddie Garcia as Julian "Lolo Juls" Dela Cruz
- William Lorenzo as Ben Galang

Recurring cast

- Lilia Cuntapay as Babaylang Lurkea
- Precious Lara Quigaman as Reyna Nerea
- Martin del Rosario as Bagno
- Marlann Flores as Liway
- Maricar Reyes as Tatlong Maria
- John Regala as Agor
- Tien Dung as Rabuyo
- MC Calaquian as Queenie

Guest cast

- Jhong Hilario as Poldo
- James Blanco as Emil
- Gretchen Barretto as Helen
- Bugoy Cariño as Kyle
- Epy Quizon as Franco
- Richard Quan as James
- Ivan Carapiet as Digo
- Ella Cruz as Rebecca
- Jane Oineza as Shermaine
- Jason Abalos as Omar
- Jovit Baldivino as himself
- Chokoleit as Lorelei
- Lassy Marquez as Ariel
- Zaijan Jaranilla as Tonton
- Vangie Labalan as Pacing
- Jong Cuenco as Warden Galvan
- Vice Ganda as Santana
- Susan Africa as Debbie
- Joshen Bernardo as Gabby
- Lito Pimentel as Victor
- Xyriel Manabat as Tata
- Ron Morales as Abdul
- Kean Cipriano as Peter
- David Chua as Bruce
- Slater Young as Tony

Special participation

- Mylene Dizon as Amelia dela Cruz
- Jaime Fabregas as Fr. Ramoncito "Cito" Gonzales
- Izzy Canillo as young Juan
- Alyanna Angeles as young Rosario
- Polo Gander as young Emil
- Lance Lucido as young Asiong
- Jomari Yllana as young Julian
- Kristel Fulgar as young Amelia
- Belle Mariano as young Mira
- Tonton Gutierrez as Haring Mana-on
- Ronnie Lazaro as Dalik

== Production ==
The show was originally a film concept intended to be directed by Richard Somes for the 2012 Metro Manila Film Festival. It was to be topbilled by Coco Martin, Jake Cuenca, Albert Martinez and Maja Salvador. In August 2012, Cinemedia Films Production Incorporated and ABS-CBN Unit Head, Deo Endrinal confirmed that it would be serialised into a television drama to be directed by Malu Sevilla. Earlier reports claimed that Angel Locsin would be Martin's leading lady, after her two-year hiatus in television, but was later replaced by Erich Gonzales.

It is under the production of Dreamscape Entertainment TV managed by Roldeo T. Endrinal and Julie Anne R. Benitez whose projects include the top-rating dramas Ina, Kapatid, Anak and Kailangan Ko'y Ikaw. The drama series is broadcast in full high definition and is dubbed to be the "most expensive and biggest drama" to date. A TV special titled "Juan dela Cruz: Ang Simula (The Beginning)" was aired on February 1, 2013, featuring exclusive behind-the-scenes footage and cast interviews of the highly anticipated drama, hosted by Kim Atienza.

Scenes from the series were shot in Pakil, Laguna.

== Music ==
=== Soundtrack ===
Juan dela Cruz: The Official Soundtrack

Soundtrack album by Various Artists
- Released: 2013
- Genre: R&B, P-pop, hip hop
- Label: Star Music
- Producer: ABS-CBN Film Productions, Inc.

No.	Title	Artist	Length
1.	"Maging Sino Ka Man"	Martin Nievera	3:11
2.	"Maging Sino Ka Man (Duet Version)"	Martin Nievera and Zsa Zsa Padilla	3:25
3.	"Sa Isang Sulyap Mo"	Bryan Termulo	4:06
4.	"Alab ng Puso"	Abra	4:09
5.	"Pusong Bato"	Jovit Baldivino	3:53

Juan dela Cruz: The Official Soundtrack Volume 2

Soundtrack album by Various Artists
- Released: July 28, 2013
- Genre: R&B, P-pop, pop rock
- Label: Star Music
- Producer: ABS-CBN Film Productions, Inc.

No.	Title	Artist	Length
1.	"Maghintay Ka Lamang"	Roel Manlangit	3:55
2.	"Sana'y Kapiling Ka"	Angeline Quinto	3:44
3.	"Kaibigan Lang Pala"	Liezel Garcia	3:56
4.	"Buko"	Jireh Lim	5:15
5.	"Ibong Ligaw"	Juana Cosme	4:12

=== Other music ===
Jesse Lasaten and Von Guzman composed the show's background music using choir, duduk, bullroarer, Yamaha GX-1, and other instruments such as the balalaika for the Kapatiran theme in the drama with a full orchestra. The music was made by the Hollywood Studio Symphony.

Jesse Lasaten, after doing work on the epic historical war film El Presidente, composed the background music of Juan Dela Cruz. He used some instruments such as the bullroarer, didgeridoo, Moog synthesizer, and ocarina to make the show's score.

== Reception ==
=== Ratings ===
After 3 weeks of airing, Juan dela Cruz quickly rose to becoming one of the most successful action fantasy-drama of all time registering 42.6% viewership ratings nationwide according to the February 21 data released by Kantar Media.

Kantar Media National TV Ratings (7:45PM PST)
Pilot Episode	Finale Episode	Peak	Average
36.5% February 4, 2013	38.3% October 25, 2013	42.6% February 21, 2013	34.8%

=== Awards ===
Year	Award-Giving Body	Category	Recipient	Result	Source
2013	27th Star Awards for Television	Best Primetime Drama Series	Juan dela Cruz	Won	
2013	27th Star Awards for Television	Best Drama Actor (Primetime)	Coco Martin	Won	
2013	27th Star Awards for Television	Best Drama Supporting Actor (Primetime)	Aaron Villaflor	Won	
2014	45th GMMSF Box-Office Entertainment Awards	Top Rating Primetime Drama	Juan dela Cruz	Won	
2014	12th Gawad Tanglaw Award	Best Performance by an Actor (TV Series)	Coco Martin	Won	

== My Little Juan ==
After the primetime success of Juan dela Cruz, the show was later given a follow-up series called My Little Juan, which tells more about Juan's childhood before he was known as the new Tagabantay. The series premiered on May 20, 2013 and ended on September 13, 2013.

== See also ==
- List of programs broadcast by ABS-CBN
- List of ABS-CBN Studios original drama series
- My Little Juan
