= Faithfully (Jovit Baldivino album) =

Studio album by Jovit Baldivino
- Released: July 2010
- Recorded: 2010
- Genre: Pop
- Label: Star Music/Sony Music

Jovit Baldivino chronology
Faithfully (2010)	I'd Do Anything For Love (2010)

Singles from Faithfully
- 1. "Too Much Love Will Kill You" Released: July 2010; 2. "Faithfully" Released: August 2010; 3. "Paano" Released: September 2010

Faithfully is the debut album of Jovit Baldivino, the first grand champion of Pilipinas Got Talent. The album was released in July 2010 under Star Music in cooperation with Sony Music Philippines. The album debuted at number one with approximate sales of 10,000 units, becoming one of the best sales week for an album in the Philippines for 2010. It stayed at number one for seven consecutive weeks, selling in excess of 4,000 copies each week, bringing his total of 60,000 copies and received a triple platinum recognition for this album.

The 12-track album consists of six songs and non-vocal "minus one" versions of them, including the songs he performed on the said contest: "Faithfully" by Journey (audition) and "Too Much Love Will Kill You" by Queen (finals).

== Track listing ==
1. "Faithfully"
2. "Too Much Love Will Kill You"
3. "I'll Be the One" (pop version)
4. "Always"
5. "Paano"
6. "I'll Be the One" (alternate version)
7. "Faithfully" (minus one)
8. "Too Much Love Will Kill You" (minus one)
9. "I'll Be the One" (pop version) (minus one)
10. "Always" (minus one)
11. "Paano" (minus one)
12. "I'll Be the One" (alternate version) (minus one)

== Singles ==
"Too Much Love Will Kill You" was the first single released off the album. In June 2010, the song was Baldivino's winning song on Pilipinas Got Talent.

"Faithfully" was released as the second single. This was the song sung by Baldivino during his audition on Pilipinas Got Talent.

"Paano" is a song originally recorded by Kris Lawrence from his 2006 self-titled album under Star Records, written by Christian Martinez. It was released as the third single from Faithfully in September 2010.

The album tracks "I'll Be the One" and "Always" gained airplay in the Philippines.
