= List of Juan dela Cruz episodes =

This is a List of Juan dela Cruz episodes.

== Series overview ==
Month	Episodes	Peak	Average Rating	Rank
February 2013	19	42.6% (Episode 14)	37.9%	#2
March 2013	19	37.7% (Episode 26)	35.7%	#1
April 2013	22	35.8% (Episode 45)	33.4%	#1
May 2013	23	35.7% (Episode 67)	33.3%	#1
June 2013	20	38.1% (Episode 93)	34.0%	#3
July 2013	23	36.5% (Episode 125)	34.9%	#2
August 2013	22	38.1% (Episode 137)	35.9%	#1
September 2013	21	34.9% (Episode 154)	33.2%	#2
October 2013	19	38.3% (Finale Episode)	34.5%	#1

== Episodes ==
=== February 2013 ===
Episode No.	Rating	Original Air Date	Timeslot Rank	Whole Day Rank	Source
1	36.5%	February 4, 2013	#1	#1	
Long ago, humans waged war against the creatures of darkness, the aswang. With the help of the legendary Cross of Steel and King Mangaraw's bravery, they were able to defeat the aswang and force them into hiding. Hundreds of years into the present, the Cross of Steel is now in the hands of Amelia, its latest guardian. Fearing for the safety of the Cross of Steel and her unborn child, she goes into hiding to protect the only weapon that could save all of mankind and its future wielder.
2	36.5%	February 5, 2013	#1	#2	
Juan begins to notice the Bakal Na Krus (Cross of Steel) and asks Father Cito why the cross is so special. Father Cito visits Amelia's grave to tell her how Juan is doing. When Father Cito returns, he finds out that Juan has been playing with the holy host. He reprimands Juan and disciplines him. Father Cito continues to instill good moral values in Juan. Later, Juan asks Father Cito about his father. Elsewhere, Samuel is threatened by an angry and raving businessman.
3	37.1%	February 6, 2013	#1	#1	
While brooding in the woods and hiding from Father Cito, Juan befriends a young runaway named Rosario. Meanwhile, Father Cito's sister, Belen, visits his parish to tell him about a foreboding omen. Father Cito remains dismissive but he soon finds out that Belen is right to worry.
4	38.1%	February 7, 2013	#1	#1	
Juan's faith and courage are tested when a burglary results to the untimely death of Father Cito. With the death of his guardian, Juan embarks on a new journey with Belen and eventually meets a new friend, Asiong, who helps him on his mission to find the stolen Cross of Steel.
5	38.2%	February 8, 2013	#1	#1	
Belen advises Juan to stay away from trouble while waiting for the right time to obtain the Cross of Steel. However, trouble follows Juan while growing up and he uses his extraordinary strength to defend himself. Later, the police summons Juan along with other suspects on a murder case. With no concrete evidence, Juan is quickly released. When news of serial aswang (vampire-like shape shifter) killings spread, the authorities request Juan to use his connections to arrest the assailant. Envy strikes Juan after watching Mikael Reyes, a police officer who acknowledged his father upon receiving an award for his bravery. Later that day, Juan gets a lead on the Cross of Steel through a drawing made by Pikoy, one of the street children in Quiapo.
6	35.9%	February 11, 2013	#1	#2	
Juan runs after Poldo after dealing with his thugs. He grabs Poldo by the collar as he forces him to reveal where he is keeping the Cross of Steel. Poldo tricks him and throws him over the bridge but Juan manages to keep himself from plummeting to the river below. He then chases Poldo to his hideout where he finds the Cross of Steel. While Juan deals with Poldo, Asiong and Pikoy lead a group of street children out of Poldo's hideout. Meanwhile, Samuel consults a seer to ask about the prophecy about his son. The seer tells Samuel that his son, the child of darkness, will fulfill the prophecy as foretold. Shortly after his encounter with Juan, Poldo is found dead and disemboweled. Reports claim that his horrible death was the work of an aswang.
7	36.3%	February 12, 2013	#1	#1	
Samuel meets with some aswang officials to discuss their "food" rationing scheme. The officials tell him that some aswangs have started to hunt humans because they are tired of feeding on cold flesh. Samuel warns Kael that he must move swiftly and catch the rogue aswang. Juan tries to start a conversation with Rosario but she fends him off for being too cocky. He tries to talk to Rosario again but his attempt was interrupted by an irate customer. Juan and Rosario are taken to the police station after an altercation with the rampaging customer. They are taken to the police station after an altercation with the rampaging customer. However, Juan is pleased to know later on that Rosario was an old friend.
8	36.1%	February 13, 2013	#1	#2	
Kael is stunned when he finds out that the rogue aswang he has been looking for is his uncle Emil. To clean up after Emil's mess, Kael orders his men to round up possible suspects to use as scapegoats for the grisly murders. Following Kael's directive, the police invite Juan to the police station for questioning. There, he encounters Kael for the first time.
9	—	February 14, 2013	—	—	
A few days before his birthday, Juan suddenly starts to experience strange changes with himself and bizarre delusions concerning the Cross of Steel. On the other hand, Pepe and the Kapatiran remain puzzled by the prolonged absence of the Tagabantay. Meanwhile, one of Emil's kind relates to him how a man recognized him in his aswang form.
10	37.5%	February 15, 2013	#1	#2	
Confusion strikes Juan as he sees strange-looking people on the streets. Elsewhere, Samuel and his family lead the aswangs in celebrating their success in penetrating the mortal world as part of their ultimate plan to take over the human race. Later on, the feast continues as the aswangs devour human flesh. Believing that the Tagabantay is no longer alive, Samuel remains confident that his son, the child of darkness, will soon lead the aswangs in taking over the human race. Meanwhile, Juan encounters Emil and his group on his way to his date with Rosario. He recognizes the group in their aswang form and a fistfight follows where Juan exhibits extraordinary strength. Pepe and Agustin of the Kapatiran arrive in time to help Juan and marvel at his remarkable strength. Pepe and Agustin mull over their encounter with Juan and become determined to know his true identity.
11	39.4%	February 18, 2013	#1	#2	
After failing to show up at their date, Juan tries to woo Rosario by delivering a bunch of flowers for her. En route, Juan spots Pepe and Agustin and makes a run for it. Pepe and Agustin knock Juan unconscious and take him to their hideout. After he slips out of unconsciousness, they start to question Juan and convince him to join them in their fight against the aswangs. After listening to what they have to say, Juan frees himself from his bonds and knocks out Pepe and his men. As he makes his way out of Pepe's hideout, he spots Emil and a number of other aswangs. Asiong later reveals to Belen that Juan has been seeing aswangs. Belen confronts Juan about Asiong's revelation and promises to help him.
12	40.5%	February 19, 2013	#1	#1	
Samuel rebukes Kael after he kills two members of the Kapatiran. Laura asks Samuel to be more patient with Kael and promises him that he will help prepare Kael for his role. Meanwhile, Juan finally talks to Rosario and apologizes for always causing her trouble. From a distance, Pepe sees Rosario and finds her utterly familiar. The following day, Rosario and Juan go out for a walk. Just when Juan is about to tell something important to Rosario, he sees Emil and his aswang cronies and makes a run for it. After fleeing from Emil, Rosario finally tells Juan she is ready for courtship. Later that evening, Emil enters Juan's room and sees the Cross of Steel. Juan arrives just in time to see Emil holding the cross. Emil and his men change into their aswang forms after Juan corners them.
13	39.8%	February 20, 2013	#1	#1	
Emil's death raises plenty of questions not only for Samuel and Laura but for Juan as well. Laura ponders on Emil's revelations and is forced to consider the possibility that Samuel may have had a child with Amelia. Meanwhile, Juan becomes aware that the aswangs have a special interest in the Cross of Steel. He consults the only person who knows more about the aswang and possibly the cross-Pepe.
14	42.6%	February 21, 2013	#1	#1	
Pepe's suspicions about Juan's identity and role in the battle against the aswangs are confirmed when the Cross of Steel transforms into the Sword of Courage in Juan's hand. Meanwhile, Laura seeks Samuel's permission to leave and spend time alone. Juan, on the other hand, decides to go to the province and seek answers to his questions about his identity.
15	41.7%	February 22, 2013	#1	#1	
While Laura tries to track the whereabouts of the last known Tagabantay, Juan finally agrees to take on the role of the guardian of the Cross of Steel. However, Juan refuses to join the Kapatiran and follow their way of life. Moreover, Juan deliberately avoids Rosario to keep her away from trouble. Meanwhile, Samuel warns Kael to be wary of his moves after a Kapatiran member is caught spying on him.
16	37.6%	February 25, 2013	#1	#1	
Juan's relationship with Rosario starts to suffer as Juan prepares himself for his role as the Cross of Steel's guardian. As his love life takes the back seat, Juan begins training himself with the various weapons that the Cross of Steel can transform into.
17	37.9%	February 26, 2013	#1	#1	
Juan is getting more and more frustrated in his training with Pepe as he still cannot conjure the Sword of Courage from the cross. To make matters worse, his relationship with Rosario continues to take an ugly turn.
18	36.1%	February 27, 2013	#1	#1	
After helping Helen and her son Kyle out of a tight spot, Juan offers them temporary shelter in Belen's house. However, Juan and Belen soon discover that Helen is not as innocent as they thought.
19	37.3%	February 28, 2013	#1	#2	
Juan sets out as a masked vigilante and rescues Samuel from Franco and his gang. After seeing Juan's display of bravado and fighting skills, Samuel becomes curious and orders Kael to look for him.
the second-most-watched program in February 2013 with 37.9% average rating.

=== March 2013 ===
Episode No.	Rating	Original Air Date	Timeslot Rank	Whole Day Rank	Source
20	36.2%	March 1, 2013	#1	#1	
Juan continues to masquerade as a masked vigilante as he uses his exceptional ability to prevent crimes. As reports on the unlikely hero begin to spread, Samuel announces his eagerness to meet the man behind the mask. Belen, on the other hand, refuses to support Juan's endeavor as she fears that it might put Juan's life in jeopardy.
21	36.0%	March 4, 2013	#1	#1	
Pepe says Juan's undertakings as a vigilante is the reason for his lack of concentration in training. Juan disagrees and sees his vigilantism as a way to help people. Meanwhile, Kael's rudeness turns Rosario's admiration for him into anger. After Samuel helps him escape from jail, Franco promises to help him nab the masked vigilante—dead or alive. Meanwhile, Juan serenades Rosario to try and patch things up with her.
22	36.1%	March 5, 2013	#1	#1	
Faced with the thought of leaving his loved ones behind, Juan suddenly fears for his life during one of his crime-fighting missions. Samuel orders Kael to leak Franco's whereabouts to the public in an effort to lure the masked vigilante. Meanwhile, an old prisoner leads an escape from a Malaysian prison.
23	36.6%	March 6, 2013	#1	#1	
Kael's efforts to unmask the mysterious vigilante are futile as Juan escapes him and to catch Franco, but our hero gets into a tight spot during his fight with Franco. Juan faces his fears and finally unleashes the Sword of Courage. In Malaysia, the fugitive Julian prepares to return to the Philippines to carry out a special mission.
24	36.9%	March 7, 2013	#1	#1	
Using the Sword of Courage, Juan finally seizes the thieves he failed to catch at the convenience store. Rosario is rushed to the hospital after Kael accidentally runs over her foot. After taking Rosario home, Kael crosses paths with Juan, who warns him not to mess with Rosario again. Meanwhile, Julian returns to the Philippines and arrives at the church in San Juan.
25	36.6%	March 8, 2013	#1	#1	
Samuel's personal search for the vigilante brings him face-to-face with Juan. Juan, on the other hand, continues his training despite his misgivings about keeping his identity a secret from Rosario. Meanwhile, Julian finally finds Amelia's son and secretly watches over him.
26	37.7%	March 11, 2013	#1	#1	
Juan finds a new friend in Julian, who introduces himself as the missionary Bro. Jules. Meanwhile, with Laura's consent, Queenie unleashes his aswang self on their fraudulent private investigator.
27	37.5%	March 12, 2013	#1	#1	
Juan and Asiong devise a plan to save two stepsisters from an aswang. Sharmaine tells Juan and Asiong about a deal she made with an aswang to save her stepsister Rebecca from its clutches. Asiong disguises himself as Sharmaine's first of four girl offerings to the aswang. Juan stays hidden and lets the aswang lead him and Sharmaine to its hideout. Juan saves Asiong and Rebecca from the aswang using the Sword of Courage. Meanwhile, Laura sets Kael up on a date so he can forget his feelings for a human girl.
28	34.4%	March 13, 2013	#1	#1	
Kael and Rosario start anew as friends, stirring Juan's jealousy. Laura organizes a charity event in Quiapo, where she meets Juan and deems him a valuable asset in her search for the Guardian.
29	36.4%	March 14, 2013	#1	#1	
Bro. Jules promises to help Juan win Rosario's affection. After helping Rosario out at the flower shop, Kael expresses his desire to woo her. Rosario tells him that they are better off as friends. Bro. Jules advises Rosario to pray for a sign in finding the right man for her. Later, he commands Juan to give Rosario a cat. Just when Juan is about to give his present to Rosario, Kael arrives at Rosario's doorstep with a cat in hand, as well. While Rosario agrees to go out with Kael, a group of policemen suddenly seizes Juan.
30	36.1%	March 15, 2013	#1	#1	
Believing that Juan succeeded in winning Rosario's heart by giving her a cat, Julian is surprised when Rosario tells him that it was Kael who managed to give her the sign she prayed for. Kael triumphs at the news and sees Juan to spite him. However, Samuel interferes in favor of Juan, after Asiong tells him of his friend's plight. Kael questions his father's motive for protecting a human like Juan. However, Samuel insists that Kael should learn from his enemy. Laura also tells Kael not to lay a hand on Juan, but only until she makes good use of him. Juan takes the cross necklace Belen suggested as a gift to Samuel and goes to his office, unwary of the aswangs thriving in the building. Laura unknowingly loses her protective bracelet, and vulnerably walks around the office. Just as when she remembers her missing talisman and looks for it, Juan sees her aswang trail and follows suit.
31	33.6%	March 18, 2013	#1	#1	
Juan visits Samuel and Laura's office and gives Samuel a small present as a token of friendship. Yearning for his father's acceptance, Kael starts to regret his decision to ask Rosario on a date even after Rosario gets her parents' permission. Segment C: Rosario slams the door on Juan after he tries to convince her to cancel her date with Kael. Juan's persistence pays off when Cora asks him to be Rosario's chaperon.
32	33.2%	March 19, 2013	#1	#1	
During his dinner date with Rosario, Kael loses his patience with Juan after he taunts Kael for being late. Fed up with the two rivals, Rosario storms out of the restaurant. Juan and Kael set aside their differences and join forces to rescue Rosario from a group of gangsters while keeping their powers hidden. Soon after, Kael is left wounded after he takes a bullet for Rosario. Juan and Rosario pray for Kael's safety as he undergoes surgery.
33	33.6%	March 20, 2013	#1	#1	
Rosario's near fatal encounter with a sinister gang pushes Juan to confess his love for her. Meanwhile, news about Kael's courageous efforts to save a human girl bothers Samuel and Laura. While Juan and Kael settle for a friendly rivalry over Rosario, Laura encounters the object of Kael's affection for the first time.
34	35.6%	March 21, 2013	#1	#1	
Kael impresses Rosario with a romantic date on a yacht, while Juan counters by cooking for Rosario and her family at home. Julian, who is yet to figure out Juan's real identity, deems it best to keep mum about his mission to defeat the aswangs. Meanwhile, Samuel tells Laura of his reason behind gaining Juan's trust.
35	34.6%	March 22, 2013	#1	#1	
Indebted to Kael for saving Rosario's life, Juan agrees to be a police informer despite Pepe's words of caution. Meanwhile, after hearing Juan mentioned Rosario's name, Pepe becomes determined to confirm if Rosario is his daughter.
36	33.9%	March 25, 2013	#1	#2	
Kael tests Juan's commitment as a police informer when he asks the Guardian to help him look for the Kapatiran. Suspicious of Kael, Pepe tasks Juan to work as a double agent and find out Kael's true reason behind the investigation. However, Juan and Kael still continue their friendly competition for Rosario, unaware that an aswang ally has been watching Kael.
37	34.1%	March 26, 2013	#1	#2	
Kael faces the consequence of his mission as the Child of Darkness when Laura orders him to end his budding romance with the human Rosario. Juan, on the other hand, threatens to leave the Kapatiran if Pepe interferes with his love life again. Meanwhile, Julian encounters an aswang and tries to squeeze out information about the Child of Darkness.
38	32.9%	March 27, 2013	#1	#2	
Most watched program in March 2013 with 35.7% average rating.

=== April 2013 ===
Episode No.	Rating	Original Air Date	Timeslot Rank	Whole Day Rank	Source
39	32.6%	April 1, 2013	#1	#2	
In order to please Samuel and Laura, Kael tells Laura that he will no longer court Rosario though he actually intends to pursue his feelings for her. Together with Juan and the rest of the Kapatiran members, Pepe sets up a plot to find out if the aswangs have infiltrated the police force and if Kael works for the aswangs.
40	32.6%	April 2, 2013	#1	#2	
Belen warns Juan about trusting Laura after failing to read Laura's fortune during her visit to their home. Meanwhile, Samuel receives reports about a rebellious and bloodthirsty group of aswangs and appoints Kael to negotiate with them. The same news reaches Juan and the Kapatiran and thus they get ready for another battle with the aswangs.
41	33.3%	April 3, 2013	#1	#2	
Juan, Pepe, and Agustin fight and kill the bloodthirsty aswangs, and this leads to the restoration of peace in the small community. News of the slaughter quickly spreads throughout the cities, which makes Samuel think that the Tagabantay of the Cross of Steel exists and that Amelia might still be alive.
42	33.9%	April 4, 2013	#1	#1	
Convinced that the Cross of Steel is in the hands of Amelia's child, Samuel agrees to summon his nephew Omar to help search for the Tagabantay. This, in turn, upsets Kael, who blames Juan for his father's loss of trust in him. Seeing that Juan is becoming too proud of his accomplishments as Tagabantay, Bro. Jules believes that it may be the right time for him to guide his grandson Juan on his mission.
43	33.8%	April 5, 2013	#1	#1	
The possibility that Amelia is still alive continues to haunt Laura and motivates her to find the Tagabantay. After being summoned, Omar finally arrives to grant Samuel's request of finding the Tagabantay using his impressive tracking skills. Meanwhile, despite Pepe's and Agustin's admonishments about his aggressiveness and complacency in completing their mission to annihilate the aswangs, Juan refuses to change his attitude as he insists that he just wants to live a normal life. Kael, on the other hand, refuses to end his courtship of Rosario in spite of her rejection.
44	34.2%	April 8, 2013	#1	#1	
Juan meets Mrs. Sanchez, the lady who claims to have been attacked by an aswang and left her with scratches on her arm. With Pepe' wide knowledge on aswangs, Juan interprets the scratches on the lady's arm as a message challenging the Tagabantay to a fight. Eager to take on the challenge, Juan defies Pepe and meets his challenger on his own.
45	35.8%	April 9, 2013	#1	#1	
Even with his rigorous training, Juan's fighting skills are no match for Omar's speed and agility. Juan loses the fight, but Bro. Jules arrives in the nick of time to wound Omar with the Sword of Courage. To answer Juan's questions about how he was able to summon the Cross of Steel, Bro. Jules relates to Juan that he is his grandfather and a former Tagabantay. Meanwhile, Omar identifies the Tagabantay as an old man. Only one person comes to Samuel's mind: his father's murderer.
46	32.5%	April 10, 2013	#1	#1	
Juan's longing for a family is finally fulfilled as Bro. Jules introduces himself as Juan's grandfather and promises to train him to be a better Tagabantay. Juan finally realizes how his arrogance had led him to his unfortunate state. While Samuel is determined to avenge his father's death by finding the older Tagabantay, Laura becomes intent on finding the younger Tagabantay to keep him from being discovered as Samuel's son.
47	34.1%	April 11, 2013	#1	#2	
While recovering at the hospital, no amount of encouragement from Julian could make Juan stop himself from thinking that he is a failure as the Tagabantay. Meanwhile, Rosario finds out about Juan's condition and seeks Kael's help to find Juan's attackers. However, Rosario's concern for Juan's welfare only fuels Kael's jealousy. Consumed with anger toward Juan, Kael plots to exact revenge on his rival.
48	35.5%	April 12, 2013	#1	#2	
Juan has not yet recovered from his previous defeat when he falls victim to Kael's henchmen's torture causing him to have a fractured kneecap. While his loved ones pray fervently for his recovery, Juan strives to put on a brace face amid his deep despair.
49	34.6%	April 15, 2013	#1	#1	
Asiong suspects that Kael is behind Juan's torture, but Juan remains trusting towards his friend. With Juan's present condition, Pepe, Agustin, and Juan all agree to let Julian be the Tagabantay for the meantime. However, Julian declines the offer and remains faithful that Juan can still fulfill his duties. Hoping to defeat the Tagabantay before long, Samuel brings out the Anito ng Karagnaya (Idol of Karagnaya) that would enable Kael to defeat the Tagabantay.
50	32.8%	April 16, 2013	#1	#1	
No amount of encouragement would make Juan change his mind about renouncing his duties as the Tagabantay. Juan's indulgence in helplessness worsens as he listens to Rosario screaming for help during their interrupted phone call. Seeing his grandson on the brink of giving up, Julian advises Juan to summon his will power in order to recover fast and help the people especially his loved ones from danger. Meanwhile, Laura inches closer to finding the Tagabantay upon learning that Belen is from San Juan Bautista.
51	31.3%	April 17, 2013	#1	#2	
Upon confirming that Juan is the vigilante, Samuel intends to turn Juan into an aswang as his skills is useful to their cause. Hence, Samuel expresses his desire to finance Juan's surgery and orders Kael to find Juan's attackers. However, Julian believes that Samuel's intentions are too good to be true and warns Juan not to be so trustful of him. Juan, on the other hand, finally decides to accept his duty as the Tagabantay once more.
52	33.5%	April 18, 2013	#1	#1	
All goes according to Samuel's plan as Juan accepts his offer to finance his surgery and therapy, and to be the representative of Laura's foundation. However, the attention being given to Juan infuriates Kael and further fuels his anger toward Juan. On the other hand, Juan finally goes home and immediately begins his training with Julian and the Kapatiran upon reprising his role as the Tagabantay.
53	30.8%	April 19, 2013	#1	#1	
As Samuel convinces Juan to work for him as a vigilante, Juan is led closer to the Idol of Saragnaya. Unaware of the idol's oracle, Juan touches the idol and inadvertently brings out its powers. Following his contact with the Idol of Saragnaya, Juan witnesses an inexplicable occurrence when he finds himself grappling to fight against a group of armed thugs.
54	32.4%	April 22, 2013	#1	#1	
Juan's speedy recovery can only be explained as a miracle which leads Julian to finally believe that Juan is the greatest Tagabantay who will defeat the Son of Darkness. Meanwhile, Kael holds on to the prophecy that he is the Son of Darkness as he finally earns Samuel's favor and the aswangs' reverence. However, Kael believes that his true victory lies in winning Rosario and getting rid of Juan.
55	33.7%	April 23, 2013	#1	#1	
While Juan grows stronger every day, Kael's skills have not yet improved. Despite nearly losing a sparring match against Samuel, Kael manages to convince his father that he is the Son of Darkness. Meanwhile, Mira and Juan finally meet, but Mira's mission to seek help from Juan is far from over as Juan is still in the process of learning to use the Cross of Steel fully. Elsewhere, Julian and Omar come face to face once more.
56	33.6%	April 24, 2013	#1	#1	
Juan and Julian fight side by side to defeat Omar and take him to the Kapatiran for questioning. However, Juan is soon forced to slay Omar after the latter attacks Pepe. After Juan and the Kapatiran get hold of Omar's mobile phone, Juan and Samuel try to outwit each other by using Omar's and the king of aswangs' mobile phones to trace each other's location, but neither one of them succeeds. In spite of her relief to learn that Samuel has yet to come in contact with the Tagabantay, Laura becomes anxious once more as her husband intends to keep his phone to lure the Tagabantay to him. Juan, on the other hand, decides to annoy the king of aswangs in hopes of making him come out of hiding.
57	34.3%	April 25, 2013	#1	#1	
As Laura is burdened that Kael has not yet gained added strength from the Idol of Saragnaya, Queenie takes her to his uncle, Romulo, who is an herb doctor for aswangs. Romulo presents Laura with incense that would reinforce Kael's sense of courage and determination. Meanwhile, the death of policemen puts the aswang food delivery business of Samuel at risk and puts Kael in charge of changing the delivery routes. However, Juan is one step ahead of Kael as he stations himself and Asiong in one of the possible routes.
58	32.3%	April 26, 2013	#1	#1	
59	32.9%	April 29, 2013	#1	#1	
60	34.2%	April 30, 2013	#1	#1	
Given the satisfactory effects of the incense on Kael, Laura is eased with one burden. Meanwhile, after successfully hampering the aswangs' food distribution, Juan and the Kapatiran also achieve finding where the aswangs store their supply of human entrails: an abandoned ice plantation. While the Kapatiran are insisting on making a surprise attack, Juan suggests that it is best to investigate first. Juan begins his probe on the area, but Samuel quietly watches through the live feeds from the security cameras installed in the plantation.
Most watched program in April 2013 with 33.4% average rating.

=== May 2013 ===
Episode No.	Rating	Original Air Date	Timeslot Rank	Whole Day Rank	Source
61	33.6%	May 1, 2013	#1	#1	
Following Julian's hunch, Agustin disables the security cameras inside the ice plant, preventing Samuel from identifying and catching the Tagabantay. However, the failure to get hold of the aswangs' stock of human entrails ignites an altercation between Pepe and Julian. In the enchanted kingdom, Princess Mirathea remains faithful that the Tagabantay will save their kingdom from doom.
62	34.9%	May 2, 2013	#1	#1	
Kael and Samuel refuse to give in to Laura's request to stop their communication with the Tagabantay. Father and son insist that the only way to defeat their nemesis is to lure him in to their trap. Meanwhile, Juan decides to focus on his duty as the Tagabantay after being rejected by Rosario. He does so by following Pepe and Agustin enter a funeral parlor. There, Juan immediately senses that something is amiss as the staff displays suspicious behavior.
63	33.5%	May 3, 2013	#1	#1	
Juan, Asiong, Pepe, and Agustin slay the aswangs inside the funeral parlor and confirm that the establishment is the aswangs' supplier of human entrails. Juan also realizes that the amulets worn by the aswangs keep him from seeing their true form. Samuel's fury about the death of the aswangs changes into intrigue when the Tagabantay states that his mission in life is to protect the people and his loved ones during their phone conversation.
64	34.6%	May 6, 2013	#1	#1	
After confirming for himself that Juan is the Tagabantay, Samuel mulls over the possibility that Juan is his son to Amelia-a truth that Laura fears to surface. On the other hand, oblivious to Samuel's discovery, Juan grows more comfortable with Samuel despite Julian's warning. Meanwhile, Rosario tells Cora how she has known about her identity since her younger years.
65	35.6%	May 7, 2013	#1	#1	
After secretly following Juan to Amelia's grave, Samuel confirms that Juan is his own flesh and blood-the real Son of Darkness. Before his father's tomb, Samuel vows to put things right for the aswang clan. Meanwhile, Julian encourages Juan to fulfill his dreams once his mission as the Tagabantay is over.
66	—	May 8, 2013	—	—	
Samuel vows to make his clan believe that Kael is the Son of Darkness, while secretly trying to make Juan accept his identity as an aswang. Meanwhile, Juan, Asiong, and Julian set out to probe the aswangs' underhand activities in a hospital.
67	35.7%	May 9, 2013	#1	#1	
Samuel's defensive scheme initially impedes Juan's investigation on the aswangs' underhand activities at a hospital. Unaware of Mira and Liway following him, Juan returns to the place with Asiong to investigate further. Meanwhile, Kael vows to win Rosario's heart again.
68	35.4%	May 10, 2013	#1	#1	
Assuring to keep the identity of the Tagabantay from getting exposed, Samuel kills the aswang informant before Kael and Laura learn about his discovery. However, Kael insists to go on with his search for the Tagabantay deeming that it is part of his mission as the Son of Darkness. With Mira's encouragement, Juan considers patching up with Rosario by telling her about his fated mission.
69	31.8%	May 13, 2013	#1	#1	
Rosario finally learns the truth about Juan. Despite their past differences, Rosario reconciles with and gives Juan the answer he has been longing for. While Samuel orders his council to keep their fellow aswangs from preying on the living, Kael receives news that sends him into a fit of rage.
70	33.5%	May 14, 2013	#1	#1	
The sight of Juan and Rosario together provokes Kael to start a fight with Juan. Later, Kael admits to Samuel that he had masterminded Juan's torture. With Rosario's desire to take part in his mission, Juan agrees to recruit and introduce her to the Kapatiran, much to Pepe's objection. Meanwhile, Laura takes advantage of Pikoy's innocence to find out the identity of the Tagabantay.
71	—	May 15, 2013	—	—	
While Samuel learns through the Anito ng Saragnayan that the Son of Darkness is gaining strength, Juan experiences a strange change in his vision. Meanwhile, the Tatlong Maria reveals a prophecy that unsettles Queen Nerea and her kingdom.
72	32.6%	May 16, 2013	#1	#1	
As Samuel continues to remain keen in winning Juan's favor, Laura's desire to eliminate the Tagabantay once and for all intensifies. Meanwhile, Belen and Julian delight over Juan's relationship with Rosario. Ben and Pepe, on the other hand, feel otherwise about their daughter's relationship with Juan.
73	33.4%	May 17, 2013	#1	#1	
Ben argues with Rosario about Juan's inability to provide her a decent future. Upon hearing how Rosario fights for him, Juan vows to strive harder and to become worthy of Ben's trust someday. After asking Samuel to stop wasting his time on Juan, Kael tells his father that their fellow aswangs are starving for human flesh. Pepe urges Rosario to stay away from the Kapatiran, while Cora barely remembers seeing Pepe before.
74	32.5%	May 20, 2013	#1	#1	
Juan finds hope in fulfilling his dream to become an engineer when Samuel offers to finance his studies. However, news of the aswangs' alarming attacks in the community requires Juan to focus on his mission as the Tagabantay. Meanwhile, Princess Mira relates to Liway the history behind Princess Peruja's vengeful ploy against their kingdom.
75	33.1%	May 21, 2013	—	—	
As the vicious attacks of the aswangs spread like wildfire in the community, Samuel orders Kael to convince their starving kins to refrain from attacking human beings. Samuel and Kael also devise a plan to prevent the possible alliance between the government and the Kapatiran against the aswangs. Meanwhile, Mira continues to unfold their kingdom's history to Liway-revealing a predestined connection between their kind and the aswang race.
76	31.5%	May 22, 2013	—	—	
Realizing the weight of his mission as Tagabantay, Juan decides to set aside his personal dream and turns down Samuel's offer to finance his studies. While Laura's aswang henchmen prepare for their plot to kill Juan, Kael and his men carry out their mission with the city mayor. Meanwhile, Mira vows to fulfill her promise to her father.
77	33.4%	May 23, 2013	—	—	
After successfully slaying a group of aswangs and escaping the attack to kill him, Juan suddenly goes missing. Meanwhile, signs of Peruja's intensifying power and impending return begin to manifest in the kingdom of Queen Nerea.
78	34.6%	May 24, 2013	—	—	
Ensuring Juan's safety, Samuel plans to confine his own son until he finds out the person who wants to kill Juan. Soon, Samuel corners Queenie and his underlings and finds out Laura's ploy against the Tagabantay. Meanwhile, Pepe fears to disclose the truth to Rosario as his mission against the aswangs remains futile. Amid the appalling situation in their kingdom, Mira tells Queen Nerea that the Tagabantay is missing.
79	31.9%	May 27, 2013	#1	#1	
Trying to find out Samuel's activities concerning Juan, Kael secretly follows his father to an abandoned place. Meanwhile, Samuel comes up with a plan that will impede his fellow aswangs from attacking humans. As the emergence of his special hearing ability causes discomfort and further confusion about his mission, a detained Juan longs for Father Cito's guidance.
80	33.7%	May 28, 2013	#1	#1	
Through the help of an unknown being, Juan escapes from confinement but is yet to figure out the motive behind his captivity. Meanwhile, Laura confronts Samuel for betraying the whole aswang clan just to protect his son to Amelia. Upon learning that Juan is the real Son of Darkness, Kael swears to kill his half-brother, much to Samuel's disapproval. Later, Samuel learns that the Anito ng Saragnayan has an important message for the Son of Darkness.
81	33.2%	May 29, 2013	#1	#1	
Concealing her dislike toward Juan, Laura makes Samuel believe that she will support his plan. Upon Juan's insistence on letting Rosario into the Kapatiran, Pepe finally reveals to him the truth about Rosario. Meanwhile, Queen Nerea orders Bagno to cross the mortal world to see if Princess Peruja remains in confinement.
82	31.9%	May 30, 2013	#1	#1	
After returning from his investigation of the mortal plane, Bagno informs Queen Nerea and Princess Mira about the cracks in the sealing stone that has kept Peruja confined. Meanwhile, Rosario is thrown into a whirlwind of emotions after she finds out the truth about her real parents from Juan.
83	34.3%	May 31, 2013	#1	#1	
As part of their vengeful plan to gain Samuel's trust, Laura and Kael encourage their fellow aswangs to set aside their hunt for the Tagabantay and focus instead on developing an island that will cultivate human preys. Meanwhile, Pepe's disapproval of Juan's relationship with Rosario further motivates Juan to gain the trust of Rosario's two fathers. Meanwhile, Mira finally gets the chance to divulge her mission to the Tagabantay.
Most watched program in May 2013 with 33.3% average rating.

=== June 2013 ===
Episode No.	Rating	Original Air Date	Timeslot Rank	Whole Day Rank	Source
84	36.2%	June 3, 2013	#1	#1	
Upon stumbling into the realm of fairies, Juan finally learns Mira's real identity and agrees to help her protect her kind from the aswangs. In hopes of acquiring new knowledge to unleash another weapon the Cross of Steel possesses, Juan masters the skill of using the bow and arrow. Meanwhile, Samuel advises Laura and Kael to turn Juan into an ally. Unknown to Samuel, the mother and son lay down a plan of their own.
85	35.1%	June 4, 2013	#1	#1	
Arriving from Princess Mirathea's kingdom, Juan tries to unleash the Bow of Wisdom from the Cross of Steel. Meanwhile, Samuel and his aswang legions begin their plans of abducting street children for their evil cause.
86	33.1%	June 5, 2013	#1	#1	
As Samuel stubbornly desires to introduce himself as Juan's father, Laura tells Kael that there is a better way to make Juan suffer. Asiong volunteers to go to Sta. Barbara to search for Juan's father, while Juan, bothered by his ongoing search for his father, finds it hard to master his skills in archery.
87	35.9%	June 6, 2013	#1	#2	
Just when Juan promises Belen that he will protect his loved ones amid his mission as the Tagabantay, Laura and Kael mastermind an evil attack against Belen. After finding a vague lead about his father's whereabouts, Juan leads the Kapatiran in saving a group of children from the aswangs. Later, news of Belen's condition stirs up Juan's vengeful desires against the aswangs.
88	35.6%	June 7, 2013	#1	#1	
As Belen regains consciousness, Juan tearfully apologizes for his absence at the time she was attacked by the aswangs. Hearing Samuel's advice, the young hero wonders what life could have been had he not become the Tagabantay. Hoping to gain back Samuel's trust, Laura and Kael express their remorse for plotting Belen's attack. Meanwhile, the king of the aswangs receives urgent news from Baylan.
89	35.1%	June 10, 2013	#1	#1	
Finding a hard time to balance his priorities, Juan yearns for advice from the late Father Cito and from Samuel, hurting Julian's feelings. After Bro. Jules hinders him from bonding with Juan, Samuel becomes curious about the old man's real identity. Meanwhile, Rosario insists on training with her biological father Pepe in her desire to battle the aswangs.
90	34.9%	June 11, 2013	#1	#1	
Despite being wounded in a battle between the Kapatiran and an aswang, Rosario ignores the advice of her parents and continues to involve herself in the ongoing fight against aswangs. She finds the perfect time to prove herself capable of combating the infamous creatures when she sees a strange man abduct a young child. Meanwhile, Juan undergoes training with Mira in his goal to unleash the Bow of Wisdom from the Cross of Steel.
91	35.3%	June 12, 2013	#1	#1	
Juan and the Kapatiran seize a young aswang named Tonton, but Juan, who upholds the values taught by Father Cito, settles to keep the young creature alive despite Pepe and Julian's objection. Rosario tries to make Ben and Cora understand her desire to save innocent children. Meanwhile, Samuel visits Belen in his attempt to know more about Bro. Jules.
92	33.9%	June 13, 2013	#1	#2	
Juan's genuine kindness leads Tonton to have a change of heart as he promises never to eat human flesh again. Just when Juan resolves to protect the young aswang even against the Kapatiran, Tonton gets in trouble that leads to the appearance of Juan's long-awaited weapon. After seeking information about Bro. Jules from a parish priest, Samuel grows more suspicious about the old man's real identity.
93	38.1%	June 14, 2013	#1	#2	
With the help of Juan and the Bow of Wisdom, Tonton sacrifices his life to save the children from Kael's aswang minions. Juan soon explains to the members of the Kapatiran about the possibility of an aswang to become harmless toward man. Meanwhile, Samuel consults the Saragnayan regarding the future of their race.
94	32.4%	June 17, 2013	#1	#1	
Juan gets one step closer to the truth after gathering information leading him to Samuel. Upon learning how the king of aswangs killed her mother, Rosario begs Pepe to continue training her for battle against the aswangs. Meanwhile, Laura assures Kael that despite Samuel's continuous efforts to protect Juan, things are going as she has planned.
95	32.5%	June 18, 2013	#1	#1	
After the revelation of the DNA test, Juan is finally convinced that Samuel is indeed his biological father. Kael and Laura become emotional as they eavesdrop on the conversation. While Samuel welcomes Juan's family into his own, Julian remains incredibly suspicious of the businessman.
96	31.0%	June 19, 2013	#1	#1	
Julian, who still distrusts Samuel, advises Juan not to easily disclose his mission as Tagabantay to his father. As part of her plan to gain Samuel's trust, Laura reluctantly agrees to live with Juan and his family in their mansion. Elsewhere, Princess Mirathea finds Queen Nerea and the rest of the fairies suffering from an outbreak of an unknown disease.
97	32.6%	June 20, 2013	#1	#1	
Kael's becomes angry again as Samuel deliberately denies him a chance to join Samuel and Laura over dinner with Juan and his family. Juan, who greatly appreciates Laura's kindness and generosity, is taken aback when Samuel asks him to live in his mansion. Meanwhile, following Rosario's tactic, Pepe and Agustin manage to enter the factory of canned goods allegedly owned by the aswangs.
98	32.5%	June 21, 2013	#1	#1	
Kael's hatred toward Juan intensifies as he feels taken for granted by his own father because of Juan. In a private talk with Samuel, Juan confesses that Julian is his son's maternal grandfather, reveals his mission as a Tagabantay, and shows the Cross of Steel to Samuel. Meanwhile, Rosario saves Pepe and Agustin from further scrutiny of officials inside the alleged aswang-infested factory.
99	31.9%	June 24, 2013	#1	#1	
Hatred fills Samuel as he learns that Julian is Juan's maternal grandfather, and the Tagabantay who killed his aswang father. Meanwhile, Kael makes his own move to finally defeat Juan from his life.
100	33.2%	June 25, 2013	#1	#1	
Juan saves some more people trapped inside their burning homes as a fire continues to ravage throughout their neighborhood. Being the target of this latest attack by the aswangs, he swears to find the Aswang King and end the war once and for all. With their ulterior motives in mind, Kael and Laura suggest to Samuel to admit to their fellow aswangs that the Tagabantay is, in fact, his son. Arriving at Samuel's mansion to stay for the meantime, Belen tells Juan of her strange and threatening vibes regarding the place.
101	32.3%	June 26, 2013	#1	#1	
While Samuel gladly accommodates Juan and his family in his mansion, Kael gets upset with his fellow aswangs for doubting his competence as the Son of Darkness. In order to get enough power to protect their kingdom from further impairment, Bagno asks Princess Mirathea to marry him. His sudden proposal, however, puts the princess of the fairies in a tight spot.
102	32.9%	June 27, 2013	#1	#1	
Upon confirming that the factory is manufacturing canned goods made from human flesh, Juan and the Kapatiran plan a surprise attack against the aswangs. Samuel senses Juan's undertaking and orders Kael to immediately vacate the factory. Angered by Samuel's request to never hurt Juan, Kael transforms into his aswang form and gears up for his first-ever encounter with the Tagabantay.
103	35.1%	June 28, 2013	#1	#1	
Kael retreats to safety after a scary fight against Juan. With Juan's refusal to leave his mission as Tagabantay, Laura finds a most suitable time to advise Samuel to introduce Juan as his son before the whole aswang race. Unknown to Samuel, the aswang council begins to have doubts about their king. Meanwhile, a mysterious warrior sets a treacherous plan in motion.
the third-most-watched program in June 2013 with 34.0% average rating.

=== July 2013 ===
Episode No.	Rating	Original Air Date	Timeslot Rank	Whole Day Rank	Source
104	32.6%	July 1, 2013	#1	#1	
Despite his grandfather's fears, Juan decides to give in to his father's desire to hold a party for him. Laura secretly celebrates the decision as it paves the way for her and the aswang council's plan of eliminating the Tagabantay to begin. Meanwhile, Princess Mira succeeds in finding an antidote for the plague brought about by the insects to the kingdom.
105	36.0%	July 2, 2013	#1	#1	
As Samuel finally introduces Juan as his long-lost son, Laura's plan is set in motion, but it does not go as she had anticipated. Meanwhile, Queen Nerea entrusts the kingdom's protection in the hands of its four powerful guardians, unaware that one of them is the mysterious warrior who is following Peruja's orders.
106	33.9%	July 3, 2013	#1	#1	
The failed assassination attempt pushes Juan to intensify his hunt for the Aswang King, especially as his loved ones' lives are further put at risk. On the other hand, Samuel faces his kin, who are at a state of unrest because of Juan's identity.
107	33.4%	July 4, 2013	#1	#1	
Juan, Asiong, and Julian's intensified investigation leads them to discover that Samuel is one of the owners of the aswang factory. Samuel manages to get off the hook, all thanks to Juan's complete trust in him, but he sows suspicion in Julian. Elsewhere, Pepe and Agustin secretly follow the prison's warden to a meeting with someone, whose identity later surprises Rosario. Meanwhile, Pikoy also makes a startling discovery as he peeks inside the Alejandro's refrigerator.
108	35.0%	July 5, 2013	#1	#1	
After learning from Laura about Kael's meeting with Juan, Samuel intervenes and faces Juan in his aswang form instead, giving the Aswang King the chance to tell Juan about his other identity. Meanwhile, the fairies are set to face another onslaught as Princess Peruja orders Agor to open the path bridging the world of the fairies to the world of the half-man, half-horse creatures called tikbalangs.
109	32.2%	July 8, 2013	#1	#1	
Pikoy tries to convince Loley that the Alejandro family's cook is an aswang, but, to his surprise, the evidence proves otherwise. While Juan tries to learn the basics of whip handling, Samuel is pressed for time to win his son over to the dark side. Meanwhile, the tikbalangs kidnap Princess Mirathea, hurting Rosario in the process.
110	33.7%	July 9, 2013	#1	#1	
As Rosario's recovery rests on Princess Mirathea's healing ability, Juan offers his assistance to Queen Nerea in rescuing the princess. Just then, Santana arrives and demands the queen to follow his conditions in exchange for the princess' freedom.
111	35.3%	July 10, 2013	#1	#1	
After a failed first attempt, Juan finally finds Santana's lair in the tikbalang's realm. Santana's pleas for mercy remind Juan of his grandfather's advice against seeking vengeance and pacify his anger. The realization enables Juan to finally summon the Whip of Justice and save Princess Mirathea from an angry tikbalang. While Pikoy draws a step closer to proving his suspicions about Laura's helper, Bagno's attempt to ask Agor about Santana's father leads the head of the soldiers to find the tikbalang.
112	34.0%	July 11, 2013	#1	#1	
Knowing that Juan's love for Rosario is pure and steadfast, Princess Mirathea heals her friend and forgoes her own feelings for Juan. Juan and Rosario become inseparable as he helps her recuperate, and they reaffirm their love for each other in a pretend wedding. Meanwhile, Kael submits to his father's wish for him to go into hiding and decides to pay Rosario a visit before he leaves. However, Kael finds Rosario with Pepe and overhears a surprising revelation.
113	35.7%	July 12, 2013	#1	#1	
After being captured by Kael, Pepe suffers under the hands of his enemy, but he refuses to give in even as he faces the Aswang King. Pepe's firm hostility drives the Aswang King to make Pepe suffer even more by turning him into one of his mortal enemies. Pikoy's relentless eagerness to prove that her cook is an aswang pushes Laura to the edge. Meanwhile, Bagno reveals the possibility that Agor is the fairy who opened the tunnel that bridges the worlds of fairies and tikbalangs.
114	33.7%	July 15, 2013	#1	#1	
Belen finally decides to leave the mansion and, much to Samuel's dismay, Juan goes with his family. Juan and Rosario also take delight in the survival of Pepe at the hands of the aswangs, unaware of the horrible transformation their enemies did unto him.
115	35.0%	July 16, 2013	#1	#1	
Despite Pepe's struggle to hide his dark secret for the sake of Rosario, Juan and the others begin to notice the strange behavior of the Kapatiran leader. Soon, Pepe tells Juan that in order to summon the Spear of Valor, he must be able to sacrifice the most important thing in his life for his duty. Meanwhile, Agor carries out the initial stages of Peruja's plan, starting with Bagno's downfall.
116	35.9%	July 17, 2013	#1	#1	
Juan and Julian's curiosity about Pepe's recent behavior is finally satisfied when Agustin voices out his suspicion that the Kapatiran leader may already be one of the enemies. Refusing to believe Agustin's claim, Rosario soon receives more heartbreaking news. Meanwhile, Laura progresses with her plans against Samuel and Juan by extending her influence to the powerful members of their kin. In the fairy world, Agor continues to poison the fairies' minds into believing that Bagno is a traitor.
117	35.9%	July 18, 2013	#1	#1	
In an attempt to force Juan to hear his pleas and kill him, Pepe puts the life of a Kapatiran member at risk. Pepe's plan works, and it also paves the way for Juan to summon the Spear of Valor. However, Juan's act of heroism also earns him Rosario's resentment. Meanwhile, Laura sets her plan to dethrone Samuel in motion.
118	36.2%	July 19, 2013	#1	#1	
Losing Pepe makes Juan and the Kapatiran members more eager to continue their fight against the aswangs. However, Pepe's demise also compels Rosario to reject Juan's plea for forgiveness and cause him to feel deep remorse in the process. Meanwhile, Agor's persistent incrimination of Bagno drives Princess Mirathea to decide to seek Juan's help.
119	34.8%	July 22, 2013	#1	#1	
Seeing Juan's situation makes Mira to decide against seeking his help. Back at the fairy world, Agor succeeds in convincing the fairy council of Bagno's association with Peruja. Armed with a stronger motivation, Juan trains harder to end the lives of the aswangs once and for all. Meanwhile, Samuel and Laura each see Juan's plight as an opportunity to fulfill their respective goals.
120	35.5%	July 23, 2013	#1	#1	
While Agor succeeds in eliminating the fairies of their head soldier, Laura rejoices as the initial stages of her plan succeeds in making Samuel realize his kin's growing disapproval of his son. However, Laura's plan also enables Juan and the Kapatiran members, now led by Julian, to gain the people's support and cooperation in fighting the aswangs. Much to Juan's concern, Rosario also joins the Kapatiran.
121	35.8%	July 24, 2013	#1	#1	
Much to Samuel's dismay, Juan has no intention of giving up his mission as the Tagabantay, especially with the public's growing consciousness of the Kapatiran's cause.Meanwhile, Agor succeeds in gaining his freedom and proposes to tell the Tagabantay about his real identity. However, Peruja assures her follower that this revelation is about to take place, for she has made Kael more powerful, and because of this, a confrontation between Kael and his brother is about to happen.
122	35.7%	July 25, 2013	#1	#1	
Juan and the Kapatiran members continue to investigate on the case of the missing children, only to be interrupted by Pikoy, who is obstinate in his desire to take part in Juan's missions. Samuel criticizes Kael for striking a deal with Saragnayan that could lead to a deadly encounter between his sons. As Juan draws a step closer to finding the Son of Darkness, Princess Mirathea decides help him and bring Agor along in hopes of learning his true intentions.
123	35.8%	July 26, 2013	#1	#1	
Mira, Liway, Agor, and a few other fairy soldiers cross over to the mortal world just in time to help Juan and the Kapatiran members fight Kael and his troop of aswangs. Pikoy's appearance gives Kael an opportunity to flee, but not before he transforms back into his human form right in front of his enemies. While Juan and the Kapatiran members assume that Kael is the Son of Darkness, Kael informs his parents about Juan's new allies. Initially refusing to follow his father's orders, Kael is soon forced to go into hiding, but he promises to beat Juan when he returns.
124	33.0%	July 29, 2013	#1	#1	
The fairies' presence prompts Samuel to investigate on their reason for helping the Tagabantay, and he soon discovers the double role Saragnayan plays in the lives of the fairies and aswangs. Meanwhile, Pikoy's desire to protect his friends from suspicious strangers leads him into the heart of the aswangs' operations.
125	36.5%	July 30, 2013	#1	#1	
The revelation about Saragnayan distracts Samuel badly, making Laura believe that her plans are working and that he is already losing morale. Juan and the Kapatiran members continue to search for Pikoy, while the young boy discovers in horror the creatures behind the comfort that welcomed him and the other children on an otherwise paradise-like island.
126	36.2%	July 31, 2013	#1	#1	
Samuel becomes determined to form a new path for his kind and sees its promise in the island. However, Juan and the Kapatiran join forces with the authorities in looking for the missing children and alerting the public about the aswangs' activities. Meanwhile, Agor progresses in his personal mission as he slowly gains Juan's sympathy.
the second-most-watched program in July 2013 with 34.9% average rating.

=== August 2013 ===
Episode No.	Rating	Original Air Date	Timeslot Rank	Whole Day Rank	Source
127	35.9%	August 1, 2013	#1	#1	
Samuel becomes determined to form a new path for his kind and sees its promise in the island. However, Juan and the Kapatiran join forces with the authorities in looking for the missing children and alerting the public about the aswangs' activities. Meanwhile, Agor progresses in his personal mission as he slowly gains Juan's sympathy.
128	35.6%	August 2, 2013	#1	#1	
Hoping to keep Juan from discovering the location of the aswangs' island, Samuel orders to have Pikoy taken far away from the place. Meanwhile, Pikoy's attempt to reveal the identities of their captors to the other children eventually reveals his presence in the island to Kael. Despite Agor's success in earning the Tagabantay's friendship, Mira's doubts about Agor persists.
129	35.3%	August 5, 2013	#1	#1	
Rosario's tough words helps Juan regain his fire to fight against the aswang after Kael's threat to kill Pikoy on the island leaves Juan demoralized. Meanwhile, Agor finally earns Princess Mirathea and Queen Nerea's trust after intentionally putting himself in danger to save the princess. Samuel, on the other hand, loses the faith of his own kind because of his relation to the Tagabantay.
130	37.3%	August 6, 2013	#1	#1	
Considering Julian's doubts about their informant's intentions, Juan and the Kapatiran members cautiously proceed to the pier to gain access to a ship allegedly used in the aswangs' operations. In the heat of the battle, the Tagabantay accidentally unleashes a brand new weapon. Meanwhile, Mira talks Rosario into accepting the truth that she still has feelings for Juan despite her hatred for him. Pikoy and his fellow abductees start plotting their escape plan.
131	36.3%	August 7, 2013	#1	#1	
Juan and his allies make their way towards the island where Pikoy and the other children are held captive. Kael and his armed minions prepare a fitting welcome for the oncoming intruders. At the same time, Pikoy and his fellow abductees execute their plan of escape.
132	37.8%	August 8, 2013	#1	#1	
Juan and his allies successfully retrieve Pikoy and his friends from their aswang abductors. Hoping to save the rest of the abductees and destroy the aswangs' fortress, Juan and his allies prepare to go up against the remaining enemies, including Kael. Arriving on the island, Samuel orders Kael to retreat, but to no avail. Meanwhile, Agor pays Peruja a visit to update her about his success in gaining the trust of the Son of Darkness and his comrades.
133	36.9%	August 9, 2013	#1	#1	
Invading the aswang's fortress, Juan's allies save the remaining abducted children. Juan faces off with Kael in another fierce battle where he receives the most shocking revelation of his life.
134	36.4%	August 12, 2013	#1	#1	
Despite his and the Kapatiran's success in rescuing the children from the aswangs' island, Juan returns to Manila burdened by Kael's revelation. With Father Cito's words in mind, Juan travels back to San Juan Bautista in hopes of finding the truth behind his real identity.
135	37.1%	August 13, 2013	#1	#1	
Revisiting his roots in San Juan Bautista, Juan receives a bit of enlightenment about who he really is. To make matters worse for Juan, Samuel follows him and tells him about his identity as the Son of Darkness.
136	37.4%	August 14, 2013	#1	#1	
Still on a self-imposed exile, Juan becomes eager to resolve the dilemma brought about by his discovery of his real identity. Kael and Laura lead the aswang council in plotting out a coup against Samuel. In an attempt to learn the identities of the Aswang King and the Son of Darkness, Julian, the rest of the Kapatiran members, and their allies are shaken by what they discover.
137	38.1%	August 15, 2013	#1	#1	
Almost losing the Cross of Steel to his grandfather, Juan begs Julian to let him keep it in order for him to prove that his Tagabantay lineage is stronger than the aswang blood flowing in his veins. Supporting Juan, Princess Mirathea attempts to convince Queen Nerea and the members of the Kapatiran to give him a chance. Reporting to Princess Peruja, Agor plans to take advantage of Princess Mirathea's affection for the Tagabantay.
138	36.3%	August 16, 2013	#1	#1	
Juan makes his way to Antipolo in hopes of finishing his mission as the Tagabantay and finally slay the Aswang King. At the aswang conference, he stands witness as Kael and his conspirators stage a coup against Samuel. As the Aswang King slowly loses his strength after being attacked by his subjects, Juan steps in and tries to help his father escape. The Kapatiran members also join in the fray and eliminate as many aswangs as they can.
139	35.7%	August 19, 2013	#1	#1	
Juan spares Samuel and brings him to safety. This causes the Kapatiran, including Rosario, to declare Juan as their enemy. While Rosario completely loses her faith in Juan, Mira still believes that he has a good reason for saving the Aswang King. Meanwhile, Kael takes over the aswang clan. His first order: Kill Juan and Samuel and begin the onslaught against the human race.
140	31.6%	August 20, 2013	#1	#1	
After instructing his subjects to kill the ousted Aswang King, Kael orders a surprise attack on the humans in Manila. The outnumbered members of the Kapatiran attempt to contain the threat posed by the vile aswangs. Soon, the Kapatiran members receive a message from none other than Kael, who threatens to continue attacking the humans if they do not surrender.
141	31.9%	August 21, 2013	#1	#1	
Kael and his army of aswangs lure the Kapatiran in an abandoned building. Equipped with firearms, they make their attack. Juan and the ousted Aswang King, Samuel, suddenly appear to assist the Kapatiran in the fierce battle that ensues.
142	36.0%	August 22, 2013	#1	#1	
Dreaming about Juan battling a dark fairy named Saragnayan, Belen immediately tells Juan about this premonition. Through Agor's help, Juan learns about Saragnayan's real identity as well as his role as the Son of Darkness. Meanwhile, Samuel begins his streak of vengeance against the aswangs who betrayed him, for he plans to reclaim the title of Aswang King from Kael.
143	34.5%	August 23, 2013	#1	#1	
Days after grabbing power from the Aswang King, Kael receives negative feedback about his leadership from his subjects because of his impulsive decisions and actions. Hoping to learn the whereabouts of Saragnayan's magical stone, Juan tries to win Samuel's trust by offering to help reclaim the throne from the usurper Kael.
144	37.7%	August 26, 2013	#1	#1	
Kael pushes through with his coronation as the new Aswang King until a most unwelcome visitor makes his entrance: Samuel. Juan secretly helps Samuel regain power with only Asiong, Mira and Agor on his side. As Kael and Samuel go head to head, the Tres Marias makes an ominous prediction concerning Juan, the Son of Darkness.
145	35.6%	August 27, 2013	#1	#1	
Eliminating all those who oppose him, Samuel reclaims his throne as Aswang King. Hoping to win his father's trust and later get hold of Saragnayan's stone, Juan decides to resort to drastic measures and abandon his duty as the Tagabantay. Juan rushes to carry out his plan when he learns that an imminent eruption of four volcanoes would somehow be connected to the evil princess Peruja.
146	36.2%	August 28, 2013	#1	#1	
Much to everyone's surprise, Juan finally abandons his duty as the Tagabantay and leaves behind the Cross of Steel. Samuel soon brings Juan to his home and introduces his son to the ideal world of Aswangs he means to preserve. For his part, Juan secretly continues with his mission to fully gain his father's trust and get hold of Saragnayan's stone.
147	34.2%	August 29, 2013	#1	#1	
Juan goes on a mission to find the Saragnayan stone before the subsequent eruptions of the four dormant volcanoes occur. Wanting to preserve peace within the aswang world, Samuel hides the sacred totem before the Son of Darkness lays hands on it and unleashes the evil princess Peruja from her magical bonds.
148	34.9%	August 30, 2013	#1	#1	
Juan realizes the gravity of his countless past aswang killings as Tagabantay as he continues his stay in Villa Grande. With news of Juan's notoriety as an aswang reaching the headlines, Samuel encourages his son to choose side between men or aswangs. Meanwhile, Asiong confides with Rosario and Julian about Juan's secret mission. Sneaking out of the aswang village, Juan finds himself followed by three aswang children, and soon cornered by the authorities.
the most-watched program in August 2013 with 35.9% average rating.

=== September 2013 ===
Episode No.	Rating	Original Air Date	Timeslot Rank	Whole Day Rank	Source
149	34.2%	September 2, 2013	#1	#1	
Juan earns the trust of the aswangs after his encounter with the authorities to save the aswang boys while marking his villainy to the humans. Secretly supporting Juan, Julian feigns antagonism toward his grandson by allying the Kapatiran with the government in an all-out battle against the creatures. As Samuel prepares his clan for the imminent fight, he urges Juan to make a decision and to choose the side of the aswangs.
150	33.4%	September 3, 2013	#1	#1	
Juan's indecision to either be the Tagbantay or be the Son of Darkness ends when Juan rescues the child-thieves from aswangs. While the remorseful child-thieves give Juan the only item they managed to steal from the aswangs' hideout, Samuel discovers that the attache case containing the real Saragnayan stone is missing. Meanwhile, as the ominous volcanic activities intensify, the leaders of the aswangs, the fairies, and the Kapatiran find ways to prevent Peruja's release. Agor, however, approaches Juan to secure Peruja's freedom.
151	33.1%	September 4, 2013	#1	#1	
Agor brings Juan to Peruja's cave and instructs him to pin the Saragnayan stone onto the cave's sacred boulder. Oblivious of Agor's motives, Juan obeys Agor. When the volcanic activities subside, the fairies and the Kapatiran thank Juan for saving the fairy world and mankind. Unknown to everyone, Peruja's spirit is not bound in the cave anymore, but has now found a temporary, mortal body to hide in.
152	33.4%	September 5, 2013	#1	#1	
153	33.0%	September 6, 2013	#1	#1	
Samuel gathers the aswangs in a mountain to prepare them for their battle against the humans, most especially the Tagabantay. Juan, on the other hand, finds a hard time focusing on his Tagabantay duties when he learns that the police saw him transform into an aswang. Meanwhile, Peruja's spirit leaves Agor's body to possess the most influential entity in the fairy kingdom. The next day, Princess Mirathea finds herself on the verge of losing her childhood friend Bagno when Queen Nerea suddenly sentences him to death.
154	34.9%	September 9, 2013	#1	#1	
Peruja begins her reign of terror by opening the passageways across realms, allowing various creatures of the night to roam freely in the human world. Fortunately, Princess Mirathea follows her instinct and allows Bagno to escape before her estranged mother executes him. Bagno crosses paths with Juan, who is perplexed by the sudden presence of the violent creatures, and convinces the latter of Agor's betrayal. Samuel also sets to pursue Peruja after learning of her possible involvement in the turmoil.
155	31.4%	September 10, 2013	#1	#1	
Juan and Princess Mirathea finally uncover Peruja and Agor's conspiracy. Fearing for Nerea's life, however, Juan and Mirathea decide to feign ignorance until they rescue the real fairy queen. Thanks to his bionic ears, Juan finds the place where Peruja and Agor are hiding Nerea's spirit. Peruja uses the opportunity to fully reawaken the Son of Darkness within Juan.
156	32.9%	September 11, 2013	#1	#1	
Though reduced to hiding in a cave with Agor, Peruja remains confident of her impending reign believing that Juan will someday succumb to his Son of Darkness nature. True enough, Juan fails in restraining his aswang nature again, this time right in front of the Kapatiran. While Agor vows to get the Son of Darkness as ally for Peruja, Kael promises Samuel that he will kill the Tagabantay himself. Meanwhile, more and more nightly creatures infiltrate and cause terror in the human world.
157	34.2%	September 12, 2013	#1	#1	
Seeing the monsters' relentless terrorizing of the human world, Princess Mirathea, Bagno, and the Kapatiran join forces in closing the passageways across realms. Unbeknownst to Juan's allies, Agustin has another mission for the Kapatiran. Samuel, on the other hand, finds a way to use the monsters' invasion to the aswangs' advantage. Meanwhile, Peruja steals the Crown of Five Jewels and decides on which monster kingdom to conquer first.
158	34.5%	September 13, 2013	#1	#1	
Juan, Princess Mirathea, and the Kapatiran set off on their quest to finding and closing the passageways across realms. The task, however, proves to be a dangerous one as Asiong is spit at by a nuno, whereas Mirathea is hypnotized with a tiyanak's human-like cries. To make things worse, Pikoy now becomes delirious. Meanwhile, Peruja and Agor steal from the nuno kingdom one of the gems needed to activate the Crown of Five Jewels.
159	33.1%	September 16, 2013	#1	#1	
Juan succeeds in closing the portals of the nuno and the tiyanaks, lessening their destructive impact on the humans. As Juan and the Kapatiran focus their energy on defeating the nightly creatures, Samuel and Kael use the opportunity to learn from their enemies and strike when they least expect it.
160	32.2%	September 17, 2013	#1	#1	
Juan regains the public's trust as he finally closes the last of the nightly creatures' portals. Kael, however, cuts Juan's celebration short when he uses Rosario's family as bait to lure the Tagabantay into his hands. Meanwhile, Peruja draws closer to activating the Crown of Five Jewels as she now has three gems for it. Knowing that only the Son of Darkness can help her find the crown's last two gems, Peruja's longing for her right-hand man intensifies.
161	34.2%	September 18, 2013	#1	#1	
Juan relinquishes the Cross of Steel to Kael in exchange for Ben and Cora's lives, but when Kael breaches the deal, Juan gets so angry that he transforms into a full-fledged aswang. Just as Juan is about to kill his own brother, Julian tames Juan by saying that they need Kael alive. When Samuel and Laura learn that Kael's plan backfired, Laura begs Samuel to let her rescue their son from the Kapatiran. Though reluctant at first, Samuel realizes that he can actually use Kael's captivity to the aswangs' advantage. Elsewhere, Agor tells Peruja that a war is about to break out, and Peruja considers this the best time for the Son of Darkness to finally get the best of Juan.
162	34.8%	September 19, 2013	#1	#1	
Juan and the Kapatiran discover too late that the exchange deal Laura offered them is actually an ambush in disguise. Before Kael escapes with Laura, he seizes Rosario and stabs her back. While Juan loses Ben and Cora's trust on him completely, Kael expends what little respect Samuel has for him. Determined to make the other pay, Juan and Kael set off on a mutual mission to kill each other.
163	30.8%	September 20, 2013	#1	#1	
Juan overpowers Kael. While Juan loses his only brother, he gets a second chance to be with his beloved Rosario as the latter regains consciousness. Unfortunately for Juan, Rosario now considers granting Ben and Cora's pleas for her to migrate with them to America. Meanwhile, Laura vows to avenge Kael to Samuel and Juan. Unbeknownst to Laura, Peruja sees Laura's misery as the key to making the Aswang Queen connive with her.
164	33.5%	September 23, 2013	#1	#1	
Juan faces the inevitable as Agustin ousts Julian from the Kapatiran and declares an all-out war against the Son of Darkness. While Juan ensures the safety of his family from his former allies, Peruja adds further fear to the human world by turning Laura into a manananggal. Satisfied with the distraction she has created, Peruja attempts to take the fourth gem from the tikbalangs, who have sought the protection of the fairies.
165	32.8%	September 24, 2013	#1	#1	
Laura intensifies Samuel's hatred toward the Son of Darkness when she blames Juan for the death of aswang soldiers she killed herself. Juan, on the other hand, gets forced to forego hiding in the province to save the city from the manananggal. In the fairy world, Queen Nerea comes up with a trick to keep Peruja from finding Rabuyo and the fourth gem.
166	32.8%	September 25, 2013	#1	#1	
Juan, Julian, and Asiong hunt down the manananggal in the city, but the Kapatiran intercepts their search and demands Juan to surrender to them. As fate would have it, the manananggal happens to be at the area nearby. While Juan escapes the Kapatiran, he falls into the hands of the manananggal. Juan uses the Sword of Courage to pry himself loose of the winged monster's grasp. Meanwhile, Peruja discovers Queen Nerea's trickery in hiding Rabuyo and the fourth gem, and it does not take long for Peruja to comprehend that the tikbalang must be seeking refuge in the human world.
167	—	September 26, 2013	—	—	
When Samuel discovers the wound on her right arm, Laura admits having an encounter with the Tagabantay but leaves out the truth about her being the manananggal. To appease Samuel's fury, Laura tells him the location of the Kapatiran's hideout. Meanwhile, Juan and Asiong return to the province upon learning from Belen that Peruja has found Rabuyo. Rabuyo, on the other hand, entrusts to Pikoy the fourth gem and gives him strands of tikbalang hair before setting off to face Peruja alone.
168	32.9%	September 27, 2013	#1	#1	
Though caught off guard, the Kapatiran members boldly face the aswangs' attack, but their guns and blades prove useless against the aswangs' preconditioned bodies. Preoccupied with his mission to save Pikoy, Rabuyo, and the fourth gem from Peruja, Juan discovers too late that his former allies are being ambushed by their mortal enemies. Juan makes his way to the Kapatiran's hideout only to find Julian as amongst the casualties Samuel left behind.
169	32.2%	September 30, 2013	#1	#1	
Juan breathes a sigh of relief when Julian regains consciousness, and he vows to get back at the aswangs for causing too many casualties in the Kapatiran. Meanwhile, Juan's refusal to accept his fate as the Son of Darkness leads Samuel to a decision against his own son. While Juan sets off to catch the manananggal, Samuel grows more suspicious about Laura's secret activities.
the second-most-watched program in September 2013 with 33.2% average rating.

=== October 2013 ===
Episode No.	Rating	Original Air Date	Timeslot Rank	Whole Day Rank	Source
170	32.9%	October 1, 2013	#1	#1	
Samuel finally discovers that Laura made a pact with Peruja, therefore giving the Aswang Queen new powers. Juan tries to learn the manananggal's whereabouts by attaching a tracking device on her. In the fairy world, Queen Nerea secures the diamond inside her realm and consents Mirathea to retrieve the diamond from the world of men.
171	33.5%	October 2, 2013	#1	#1	
Peruja uses a newly transformed Laura to make the Aswang King and the Tagabantay fight each other. Samuel also stirs his minions to move against the evil princess and those who betrayed their race.
172	37.0%	October 3, 2013	#1	#1	
Upon meeting again, Juan and Samuel engage in a fierce combat. However, the same blood in their veins prevails and the father and son choose not to kill each other. Unwilling to see her plans go astray, Peruja intervenes and claims the life of the Aswang King.
173	34.0%	October 4, 2013	#1	#1	
The aswangs bring their deceased king to his final resting place as they burn him in a pyre. Afterward, Laura swears revenge on Peruja and Juan by starting to kill mortals indiscriminately. On the other hand, Juan vows to destroy Laura and the aswang race, while Peruja plans to bring the Son of Darkness to her side as her general and rule over the aswangs.
174	35.1%	October 7, 2013	#1	#1	
Juan battles the manananggal. This time, however, the Queen of Aswangs falls short in fighting against the Tagabantay. While Peruja takes advantage of Laura's death to rule the remaining aswangs, Juan becomes bothered as his aswang self starts to get the best of him.
175	34.5%	October 8, 2013	#1	#1	
Peruja bestows new powers to the aswangs as she gives them the freedom to eat human flesh once more. With her army, the evil princess enters the kingdom of the fairies, aiming to claim the diamond from Queen Nerea. As he fights his way through the fray, Juan struggles to stop the Son of Darkness inside him from taking over his senses.
176	34.6%	October 9, 2013	#1	#1	
Despite Juan's efforts to stop his evil hand, Peruja successfully wills it to hand over the gem of the Tikbalangs to her. Using the crown of the Tikbalang King, Peruja determines the location of the gem of the babaylans. The Tagabantay gets hold of the same information from three technologically advanced men who call themselves Tres Kantos.
177	32.9%	October 10, 2013	#1	#1	
Despite the Tagabantay's efforts, Peruja successfully gets hold of the babaylan's gem and finally completes her crown. An influx of mythical creatures follows, wreaking havoc upon the mortal world.
178	32.8%	October 11, 2013	#1	#1	
The Tatlong Maria foretells ill news to Queen Nerea and Princess Mirathea about the looming defeat of the Tagabantay. After battling numerous creatures, Juan finds Peruja's hideaway to face off with the more powerful evil princess.
179	34.0%	October 14, 2013	#1	#1	
Devoting his loyalty to Peruja, the Son of Darkness leads the aswangs in attacking the kingdom of fairies. Soon, the Tagabantay regains control over his body and begs Princess Mirathea to kill him before the Son of Darkness succeeds in his evil plans. Meanwhile, oblivious to Juan's helpless condition in the hands of his alter ego, Julian and the Kapatiran hope that the Tagabantay will return and save the humans from doom.
180	35.2%	October 15, 2013	#1	#1	
Following the invasion at Queen Nerea's kingdom by Peruja, Princess Mirathea and a group of her fellow displaced fairies return to the human world to hunt down the Son of Darkness. Meanwhile, Juan struggles to bring back his old self as Julian, Asiong, and Rosario confront the Son of Darkness dominating his body.
181	33.4%	October 16, 2013	#1	#1	
Juan continues his internal struggle against his evil persona as he fights back to gain control of his consciousness. While the Son of Darkness ravages throughout the mortal world, Peruja prepares for the imminent rebirth of her body. Juan's family and friends do their best to convince their fellow Filipinos to cling on to their faith in the Tagabantay amidst the chaos.
182	35.8%	October 17, 2013	#1	#1	
Successful in overcoming the Son of Darkness, Juan proceeds to inspire hope and solidarity to his countrymen once more as they all face Peruja's reign of terror. The Tagabantay attempts to reclaim the Cross of Steel from Agor while the fearsome rebirth of Peruja's physical self draws near.
183	35.7%	October 18, 2013	#1	#1	
Juan finishes his intense battle with Agor and reclaims the Cross of Steel. Upon his return, Juan stirs his fellow humans into continuing the fight for their survival. At the same time, Peruja emerges in her new body and commands her army of aswangs and mythical creatures to put an end to the war against men.
184	35.8%	October 21, 2013	#1	#1	
Facing a ferocious battle against Peruja and her allies, Juan manages to unleash from the Cross of Steel the white light that vanquishes the evil creatures and restores the serenity in the mortal world. Deeming that his fight against the evil princess is over, Juan wastes no time in asking for Rosario's hand in marriage.
185	33.3%	October 22, 2013	#1	#1	
With all their enemies vanquished during the last battle, Juan and Rosario savor the bliss of their engagement and plan ahead for their future life together. Juan returns the Cross of Steel to its original place, believing his mission as hero is over. Following a couple of mysterious killings, together with Belen's dire dreams and the people's clamor, Juan decides to reassume his role as the Tagabantay.
186	31.8%	October 23, 2013	#1	#1	
As he decides to continue his wedding with Rosario, Juan tracks down the mysterious assailant and shockingly discovers its identity. Reborn from what remained of Peruja's powers, the Son of Darkness reveals himself as the perpetrator behind numerous attacks and pursues a mission of vengeance against the Tagabantay.
187	34.7%	October 24, 2013	#1	#1	
Arriving home, Juan soon realizes that The Son of Darkness posed as him. He recognizes too late that Rosario is the target of his evil counterpart, as she is taken captive by Peruja's orders. Publicly announcing that he kidnapped Rosario, the Son of Darkness challenges the Tagabantay to meet him in battle at a bridge.
188	38.3%	October 25, 2013	#1	#1	
A battle of epic proportions continues as the Tagabantay fights the Son of Darkness for the sake of Rosario's life. Juan encounters a setback after his evil counterpart knocks him unconscious and throws him off the bridge. He luckily wakes up in time to save Rosario before she falls to harm on the concrete. The Tagabantay soon defeats and destroys both Peruja and the Son of Darkness by piercing them with the Sword of Courage. After rushing Rosario to the hospital, Juan watches as life ebbs away from his beloved, only to be surprised when she wakes up as if in a dream. Eventually, Juan and Rosario blissfully exchange their marriage vows to each other, in front of God, their family, friends, and well-wishers.
the most-watched program in October 2013 with 34.5% average rating.
