= Jovit Baldivino =

Filipino singer and actor (1993–2022)

- Baldivino in 2015
- Born: Jovit Lasin Baldivino; October 16, 1993; Rosario, Batangas, Philippines
- Died: December 9, 2022 (aged 29); Batangas City, Batangas, Philippines
- Children: 2
- Musical career
- Genres: OPM; Rock; Pop
- Occupations: Singer; actor
- Instruments: Vocals; guitar
- Years active: 2010–2022
- Label: Star Music (2010–2022)

Jovit Lasin Baldivino (October 16, 1993 – December 9, 2022) was a Filipino singer and actor. He was the first winner of the reality talent competition show Pilipinas Got Talent in 2010.

== Early life and education ==
Jovit Lasin Baldivino was born on October 16, 1993, to Hilario and Cristeta Baldivino. He came from a poor family living in Batangas. He had four siblings, one of whom died in March 2020. He used to sell siomai at a market after school to sustain his studies and help his family.

Baldivino pursued a degree in criminology at the Batangas State University. He wanted to be a lawyer just like his godfather.

== Career ==
Baldivino would sing as a guest at birthday parties. In 2010, he joined the first season of the multi-talent game show Pilipinas Got Talent as a singer, with the intention to use prize money to help deliver his family out of poverty. At that time, he was a high school student, both of his parents were jobless, and his father was recovering from tuberculosis. He won the grand final of the talent competition by performing a cover of "Too Much Love Will Kill You" by Queen. He was later named the "Promising Recording/Performer Artist of the Year" at the 2011 Box Office Entertainment Awards.

After his success at Pilipinas Got Talent, he went on to release his own albums. Among the songs he revived were "Pusong Bato" and "Ika'y Mahal Pa Rin". "Ika'y Mahal Pa Rin" was originally sung by band Rockstar 2 and composed by Vehnee Saturno, which was the theme song of ABS-CBN's television series Angelito: Batang Ama (including its sequel Angelito: Ang Bagong Yugto), while "Pusong Bato" was originally composed and performed by Renee dela Rosa and his band Alon, which was included as part of the soundtrack for fellow ABS-CBN television series Juan dela Cruz. Other songs he covered include "Faithfully" by Journey and "Always" by Bon Jovi.

His final television appearance would be as a contestant for Team Fourda Win on the November 28, 2022, episode of GMA's Family Feud.

== Personal life ==
Baldivino fathered a daughter with his girlfriend Laurice Khaye Bermillo. After separating from Bermillo, Baldivino entered into a relationship with Shara Chavez which lasted from September 2015 to February 2017. They had a daughter from whom Baldivino became estranged after the couple broke up. Prior to his death, he was engaged to Camille Ann Miguel.

== Illness and death ==
On December 3, 2022, Baldivino was rushed to the Jesus of Nazareth Hospital in Batangas City after he experienced difficulty of breathing after performing a song during a Christmas party. He subsequently suffered a mild hemorrhagic stroke, and fell into a coma after an operation. He never regained consciousness and eventually died due to a brain aneurysm on December 9, 2022. He was buried beside the grave of his younger brother Justine on December 14 at the Paradise View Memorial Garden in Padre Garcia, Batangas. He was 29 years old.

== Discography ==
=== Studio albums ===
List of Jovit Baldivino's studio albums
| Album | Year | Record label | Certification | Ref. |
|---|---|---|---|---|
| Faithfully | 2010 | Star Music | PARI: Triple platinum | |
| I'd Do Anything for Love | 2011 | Star Music | PARI: Platinum | |
| OPM Greatest Hits Volume One | 2012 | Star Music | PARI: Triple platinum | |
| Jukebox | 2015 | Star Music | | |

=== Compilation albums ===
| Album | Year | Record label | Ref. |
|---|---|---|---|
| Himig Handog: P-Pop Love Songs | 2013 | Star Music | |
| Himig Handog: P-Pop Love Songs | 2014 | Star Music | |

== Filmography ==
=== Television ===
List of performances and appearances by Jovit Baldivino on television
| Year | Title | Role | Ref. |
|---|---|---|---|
| 2010 | Pilipinas Got Talent (season 1) | Himself (contestant) | |
| 2010–2022 | ASAP | Himself | |
| 2010 | 1DOL | Himself | |
| 2011 | Growing Up | Brando | |
| 2013 | Juan dela Cruz | Himself | |
| 2016 | We Love OPM | Himself (member of Tres Kantos) | |
| 2022 | Family Feud | Himself (player) | |

== Awards ==
| Year | Award-Giving Body | Category | Result | Ref. |
|---|---|---|---|---|
| 2011 | GMMSF Box-Office Entertainment Awards | Promising Singer/Performer | Won | |

Awards and achievements
| Preceded by New | Pilipinas Got Talent; 2010 (season 1) | Succeeded by Marcelito Pomoy |
