= List of Be Careful with My Heart episodes =

Be Careful with My Heart is a Philippine television drama romance series broadcast by ABS-CBN. Directed by Jeffrey R. Jeturian, Mervyn B. Brondial and Theodore Boborol, it stars Jodi Sta. Maria and Richard Yap. It aired on the network's Prime Tanghali line up and worldwide on TFC from July 9, 2012 to November 28, 2014. During the course of the series, 618 episodes of Be Careful with My Heart aired over two years.

The series narrative follows Maya dela Rosa and Richard “Sir Chief” Lim, played by Jodi Sta. Maria and Richard Yap, respectively, as they embark on a journey of love, healing, and family. Maya, a hardworking young woman who dreams of becoming a flight attendant, unexpectedly becomes the nanny of Richard’s youngest daughter and gradually brings warmth and optimism into the lives of the Lim family.

== Series overview ==
Year	Episode numbers	Episodes	First aired	Last aired	Peak	Average
2012	1–124	124	July 9, 2012	December 31, 2012	27.4% (Episode 78)	22.74%
2013	125–382	258	January 1, 2013	December 31, 2013	31.3% (Episode 143)	22.91%
2014	383–618	236	January 1, 2014	November 28, 2014	21.1% (Episode 420)	16.06%
Series Average						20.57%

== Episodes ==
=== 2012 ===
Blue denotes the lowest rating, while red denotes the highest. The numbers in parentheses denote the program's ranking among daytime shows based on Total Philippines (urban and rural) household viewership.

No.	Title	Original release date	Kantar Media-TNS Nationwide Ratings
1	"Episode 1"	July 9, 2012	15.2% (1st)
Maya believes that her parents' love story will end happily. Together with her unmarried sister, Kute, Maya struggles to make ends meet. When an accident takes away Kute's only hope for a better future, Maya tries her luck to work abroad.
2	"Episode 2"	July 10, 2012	14.9% (1st)
Upon arriving in Manila, Maya discovers that her recruitment agent is a fraud. Too ashamed to disappoint her family, Maya decides to stay in Manila and try her luck. Soon, serendipitous events take Maya closer to her dream of becoming a stewardess.
3	"Episode 3"	July 11, 2012	16.5% (1st)
Maya fails to land on her dream job but finds another opportunity when she saves Richard's daughter from peril.
4	"Episode 4"	July 12, 2012	17.5% (1st)
Maya starts her first day as Abby's nanny.
5	"Episode 5"	July 13, 2012	17.2% (1st)
Maya discovers how emotionally distant Richard is to Nikki and Paul. However, no matter how pure and innocent Maya's intentions are to make the Lim children happy, she gets into more trouble.
6	"Episode 6"	July 16, 2012	17.9% (1st)
Richard grants Abby's request to see a show. Maya learns the reason behind Abby's mutism.
7	"Episode 7"	July 17, 2012	19.3% (1st)
Maya cheers up Abby in unconventional ways. However, her efforts annoy Richard.
8	"Episode 8"	July 18, 2012	20.7% (1st)
After he broke his promise, Richard takes Abby to a theme park. On their way, he also invites Nikki and Luke. Meanwhile, Maya unintentionally reveals a secret to Cho.
9	"Episode 9"	July 19, 2012	21.7% (1st)
Teresita and Mamang question Kute after learning about Maya's job from Cho. Kute tries to evade their questioning in order to hide the truth.
10	"Episode 10"	July 20, 2012	23.4% (1st)
Maya video chats with her family and pretends that she works in Dubai. However, Richard sees her outside the computer shop which raises his suspicion.
11	"Episode 11"	July 23, 2012	20.2% (1st)
With Richard's relentless prying, Maya feels that her trustworthiness is in question. Her unwillingness to return to her province with Richard's family, however, pushes Richard to keep a close eye on her.
12	"Episode 12"	July 24, 2012	21.1% (1st)
Despite conflict between Luke and Richard, Luke makes a touching gesture to keep Nikki out of trouble. Meanwhile, Maya and Fred team up to help Richard grant Abby's unlikely request.
13	"Episode 13"	July 25, 2012	21.9% (1st)
Despite Maya's efforts not to cause further trouble and get fired, a fight between Abby and Nikki lands her in another mishap.
14	"Episode 14"	July 26, 2012	20.9% (1st)
To her relief, Maya retains her job. After a talk with his son's school principal, Richard reaches out to Luke but the latter keeps himself away. Meanwhile, Richard's private investigator meets Mamang, Teresita, and Kute.
15	"Episode 15"	July 27, 2012	22.5% (1st)
Maya's special dish helps ease the tension between Richard and Luke. Unknown to Maya, her family decides to close their souvenir shop and soon give up their house to pay their debts.
16	"Episode 16"	July 30, 2012	21.7% (1st)
Maya discovers that Richard hired an investigator to check on her background. Despite the investigator's positive feedback, Richard remains suspicious of her. Offended, Maya steps out of the Lim residence.
17	"Episode 17"	July 31, 2012	22.4% (1st)
Maya decides to return to the Lims. Despite his refusal to apologize to her, Richard employs her back and grants her scholarship. However, Maya inadvertently learns some bad news back home.
18	"Episode 18"	August 1, 2012	21.9% (1st)
After learning about their real situation, Maya asks her family not to give up their house. Much to her surprise, Richard becomes her family's saving grace.
19	"Episode 19"	August 2, 2012	23% (1st)
Through Maya's encouragement, Abby confesses to Richard for an offense she has done. Meanwhile, Emy's delinquency almost puts Abby in danger. Maya steps up to defend herself against Emy's accusations.
20	"Episode 20"	August 3, 2012	22.9% (1st)
Richard reprimands Emy for her delinquency during her classes with Abby. On the other hand, Richard encourages Nikki and Luke to invite their friends over to the house. To Maya's delight, Richard also grants Abby's request to play at the park.
21	"Episode 21"	August 6, 2012	23.4% (1st)
Maya takes Abby to the park. A worried Richard contacts Maya and gets angry when she refuses to answer him. After finding out that she got wounded and bullied by other kids, Richard forbids Abby to play there again.
22	"Episode 22"	August 9, 2012	20.1% (1st)
Richard surprises Abby, Nikki, and Luke with a toy plane. Abby finally gets to play at the park and beats the other children in a game of flying planes. Meanwhile, Richard forces Maya to delay her enrollment to accompany him and Abby.
23	"Episode 23"	August 10, 2012	20.9% (1st)
Richard reprimands Emy for endangering Abby. He later lets Abby play at the park with Maya's supervision, but when Maya rejects Richard's calls, he forbids Abby from playing outside again.
24	"Episode 24"	August 13, 2012	20.9% (1st)
Delayed by the rain and her injury, Maya fails to make it to her last day of enrollment. To her surprise, however, Richard makes a special arrangement with her school to allow her to enroll. Not only that, Richard also enrolls Abby in a play school.
25	"Episode 25"	August 14, 2012	23.2% (1st)
In preparation for school, Doris gives Maya a new haircut. Amid her excitement, Maya makes a blunder that causes her to be awkward to Richard. Mamang and Teresita send a package to an address that they mistook as the address of Maya's employer.
26	"Episode 26"	August 15, 2012	23.4% (1st)
Noticing how most of her classmates are relatively well-off, Maya proudly informs them about her job as a nanny. On the other hand, Abby finds a hard time coping at school on her first day.
27	"Episode 27"	August 16, 2012	23% (1st)
Maya comes up with a plan to help encourage Abby to attend play school. Richard employs a new private teacher for Abby. Meanwhile, Kute learns of a news that bothers her.
28	"Episode 28"	August 17, 2012	22.9% (1st)
With Richard's help, Maya performs well in her Mandarin Chinese class. To Richard's relief, Abby finally makes new friends at her school. On the other hand, he notices that Maya has also made friends with a male classmate.
29	"Episode 29"	August 20, 2012	25.7% (1st)
Richard warns Maya about Wilson. A sleeping Abby utters her first word after a long time. Because of the bad weather condition, the Lim children spend time together at home.
30	"Episode 30"	August 21, 2012	26.4% (1st)
While Richard impresses everyone with his guitar skills, Luke confides to Fe his sentiments towards his father. Kute turns down Maya's advice to tell Cho about his father. Later, a package arrives that greatly surprises Kute.
31	"Episode 31"	August 22, 2012	21.7% (1st)
Maya helps Kute fabricate a story so that the latter can return the package Jeff has sent and keep the truth from their family. To everyone's horror, burglars break into the Lims' house and steal several valuable belongings.
32	"Episode 32"	August 23, 2012	21.7% (1st)
In hopes of enlightening his children about the weight of the situation, Richard tells Luke, Nikki, and Abby about a same incident a relative has suffered in the past. Meanwhile, Kute senses Maya's special feelings for Richard.
33	"Episode 33"	August 24, 2012	23.7% (1st)
The entire Lim household turns sentimental as they stay in the house for the last time to collect personal items. Maya joins the Lims as they spend some private family time inside their home.
34	"Episode 34"	August 27, 2012	25.4% (1st)
Richard commends Luke for the warmth he showed his sisters and asks him to look after Nikki. Much to Kute's dismay, her friend Bitoy tells Jeff that Cho is Maya's son. Maya grows fonder of Richard.
35	"Episode 35"	August 28, 2012	20.4% (1st)
Maya denies her fellow servants' claim that she has a crush on Richard. Wilson confesses to Maya that he has a crush on her. Luke and Richard get into a tense argument when the latter forbids the former to go out with his friends.
36	"Episode 36"	August 29, 2012	22.9% (1st)
After attending a group study without Richard's permission, Luke gets held up by snatchers. Much to Luke's relief, Richard does not scold him, but tenderly expresses his worry instead.
37	"Episode 37"	August 30, 2012	21.6% (1st)
Richard reaches out and successfully reconciles with Luke. Realizing her undeniable feelings for Richard, Maya makes conscious efforts to avoid him. Kute is surprised when a man arrives outside their souvenir shop.
38	"Episode 38"	August 31, 2012	22.3% (1st)
Kute finally meets Jeff and confesses the truth to Mamang and Teresita. In a friendly chat with Jeff, Kute refuses to bring up their past. Meanwhile, Maya still gets awkwardly close to Richard despite her efforts to avoid him.
39	"Episode 39"	September 3, 2012	21.4% (1st)
Kute covers up the truth from Jeff. Doris takes a leave after learning of her grandmother's death. Amid Maya's keen efforts to avoid Richard, a series of events still draw her awkwardly close to Richard.
40	"Episode 40"	September 4, 2012	21.5% (1st)
The Lims move into their new home. With Fe spared from work, Maya is once again laden with household chores. Much to her surprise, Maya hears something special for the first time.
41	"Episode 41"	September 5, 2012	22.1% (1st)
Work finally takes its toll on Maya's health as she suddenly collapses from so much weakness and falls straight into Richard's arms. Meanwhile, Kute finally reveals the truth to Jeff.
42	"Episode 42"	September 6, 2012	21.4% (1st)
Maya is secretly delighted by Richard’s random acts of kindness towards her. Meanwhile, Cho’s desire to meet his father convinces Kute to follow Mamang and Teresita’s suggestion to reveal the truth to him in Jeff’s presence
43	"Episode 43"	September 7, 2012	22.7% (1st)
Kute and Jeff finally reveal the truth to their son Cho. Meanwhile, Richard asks Maya about her mother's knowledge on the truth about her job. Soon, Sabel returns to the Lim mansion.
44	"Episode 44"	September 10, 2012	20.9% (1st)
Convinced that Maya has fully recovered, Richard permits her to go to school again. Kute learns that Jeff shouldered the finances for her physical rehabilitation. Meanwhile, Richard gives Maya a special task.
45	"Episode 45"	September 11, 2012	23.2% (1st)
Kute ponders on the possibility of looking for a job in Manila. Maya and the Lim children discover an interesting old photograph of Richard. While everyone celebrates Luke and Maya's impressive performance in school, an unconscious Abby shows sign of hope for her condition.
46	"Episode 46"	September 12, 2012	24.4% (1st)
Much to Maya's embarrassment, Abby refuses to talk in front of everyone. Richard consults a child psychiatrist and reveals to her an earlier incident where he himself witnessed Abby talk. Maya realizes her crucial role in helping bring back Abby's ability to speak. Meanwhile, Kute finally gets a job through Simon's help.
47	"Episode 47"	September 13, 2012	24.1% (1st)
Richard and Maya decide to stay in Abby's room in hopes of witnessing Abby speak again. After several nights of waiting, both are delighted upon hearing Abby talk to Richard in her sleep. Back in the province, Kute tells Mamang, Teresita, and Cho about her work application in Manila.
48	"Episode 48"	September 14, 2012	24.3% (1st)
Abby’s speaking progress delights everyone at the Lim mansion especially Richard. Upon learning the good news, Nikki and Luke decide to stay in their sister’s room as well to witness her speak. Meanwhile, Maya learns about Kute’s job application in Manila.
49	"Episode 49"	September 17, 2012	22.5% (1st)
After hours of waiting, Luke and Nikki fail to hear Abby talk. Abby pleases Richard and Maya when she insists to go to the toilet alone for the first time. Much to Maya's joy, Richard offers to let Kute stay with them while Kute is in Manila.
50	"Episode 50"	September 18, 2012	22.9% (1st)
On their first night together after a long time, a thrilled Kute and Maya catch up on each other's lives. Richard gets into an awkward first encounter with Kute. Kute learns of some disheartening news.
51	"Episode 51"	September 19, 2012	23.1% (1st)
After Kute's failure to get a job, Maya persists in encouraging her dispirited sister to look for another one. The sisters get together with Doris, Sabel, and Joma for some fun and music. However, Richard wakes up in the middle of the night and finds Abby listening to Maya and her friends' singalong.
52	"Episode 52"	September 20, 2012	24% (1st)
Nikki's indifference toward Kute fades upon learning about Kute's effort in repairing her school project. After Richard arranges a job referral for Kute, Maya and her sister rejoice over Kute's successful job application.
53	"Episode 53"	September 21, 2012	23.3% (1st)
Richard asks Maya about the possibility of leaving Abby soon after overhearing Maya's conversation with Kute. After Maya assures Richard that she will not leave Abby, she also makes a promise to Abby and gives her a friendship bracelet. Meanwhile, Kute returns home and tells her family about her employment.
54	"Episode 54"	September 24, 2012	22.9% (1st)
Richard learns that a friend is arriving soon. In hopes of appeasing Cho's sadness, Kute dedicates her last days in town being solely with her son. Meanwhile, Richard decides to give Abby a surprise treat.
55	"Episode 55"	September 25, 2012	24.5% (1st)
As she has promised, Kute spends the day alone with Cho. Abby and Maya enjoy their first time at the zoo. While Richard is pleased at how Maya strives to be a good role model for Abby, Maya is touched by Richard's small gestures of concern. Meanwhile, Fe, Doris, and Sabel prepare the Lim mansion for Rafi's arrival.
56	"Episode 56"	September 26, 2012	23.1% (1st)
Maya manages to arrive in time to bid Kute goodbye after Richard gives her extra money to pay for a taxi ride. The arrival of Joma’s substitute sparks rivalry between Doris and Sabel. Abby rejoices with the delivery of her new pet bird. Rafi finally arrives at the Lim mansion.
57	"Episode 57"	September 27, 2012	22% (1st)
While Rafi's arrival surprises and delights everyone at the Lim mansion, Abby shows hesitation as she no longer remembers Richard's old friend. Observing the family's joy in Rafi's presence, Maya feels jealous of their beautiful guest.
58	"Episode 58"	September 28, 2012	24% (1st)
While Rafi and Richard deliberately stay up all night to catch up on each other’s lives, Maya fails to sleep because of Rafi’s coffee. Maya persuades Abby to be friendlier to her dad’s friend.
59	"Episode 59"	October 1, 2012	21.5% (1st)
As Rafi stays at the Lim mansion, Maya gets jealous of the special attention Richard devotes to their special guest. This makes Maya long for Richard that even the slightest attention she gets from him brings her so much joy.
60	"Episode 60"	October 2, 2012	23.9% (1st)
Relief fills Maya after learning that Rafi has a boyfriend. When Rafi remains reluctant to reconcile with her boyfriend, Richard tries to talk sense to her and also teases her by singing. Maya eavesdrop on their conversation and mimics Richard's singing. Richard and Maya convince Abby to have a party on her upcoming birthday.
61	"Episode 61"	October 3, 2012	25.3% (1st)
Nikki is overcome with panic upon learning that she has to replace the lead actress for their upcoming play. The whole family express their support for Nikki, especially Richard who stays up late just to help her rehearse. At the end of her successful performance, Nikki thanks everyone, including Maya.
62	"Episode 62"	October 4, 2012	22.9% (1st)
Simon sees Maya in Kute's office and follows her back to the subdivision. Unable to enter the private neighborhood, Simon contacts Maya who feels it necessary to tell him the truth. Soon, Richard learns about Maya's dilemma and sees her with Simon. Richard questions Maya about him and learns that he is Maya's suitor.
63	"Episode 63"	October 5, 2012	23% (1st)
Maya fears that Richard is upset ever since she talked about Simon. Despite telling her that he is not, Richard's recent mood still says otherwise. Meanwhile, Maya makes Rafi realize what she really feels for her boyfriend.
64	"Episode 64"	October 8, 2012	22% (1st)
Simon's presence through his incessant phone calls apparently makes Richard upset, and it unsettles Maya. It was only until Richard overhears Maya speak good things about him that his mood becomes lighter. Meanwhile, Rafi thoughtfully observes Richard and Maya's interaction from the background.
65	"Episode 65"	October 9, 2012	21.5% (1st)
Maya discovers that the bouquet of flowers from Richard is already wilting. Fe suggests a method to preserve the flowers while sharing her own tragic love story. Maya uses Fe's story as a warning to Rafi, who finally gets convinced to call her boyfriend back.
66	"Episode 66"	October 10, 2012	22.6% (1st)
Surprised to learn that Cho has a crush at his age, Kute confides to Maya her fears as a mother. Meanwhile, just when Rafi decides to follow her estranged boyfriend abroad, Charlie arrives at the Lims to reconcile with her once and for all.
67	"Episode 67"	October 11, 2012	22.1% (1st)
Charlie and Rafi’s reconciliation eventually leads to a heartwarming marriage proposal. Delighted at the couple’s engagement, Maya suggests that the Lim household organize a farewell party for Rafi and Charlie. Meanwhile, homesickness gets the best of Kute compelling her to quit her job and return home.
68	"Episode 68"	October 12, 2012	23.9% (1st)
While the household prepares for Rafi and Charlie's party, the Lim children come up with their respective ideas for a farewell gift. During the party, Rafi suggests singing in pairs, but Richard's refusal to sing leaves Maya alone to perform. To everyone's surprise, Richard sings along with her.
69	"Episode 69"	October 15, 2012	21.7% (1st)
At the end of the farewell party, Rafi and Maya establish a stronger bond between them. Rafi gives Maya a dress, which, later on, Richard firmly disapproves of as Maya's wear for her date with Simon. Meanwhile, Kute arrives safely.
70	"Episode 70"	October 16, 2012	18% (1st)
During their date, Simon makes efforts to impress Maya, but unknowingly makes her think of Richard instead. They talk about her situation, and Maya assures him that she is happy. Simon drives Maya home, where Richard, having learned more about Simon and his positive relationship with Maya's family, waits for her arrival.
71	"Episode 71"	October 17, 2012	23% (1st)
Maya learns that Richard's recent coldness towards her is due to his concern about her welfare. This makes her giddy with joy, especially when he offers to send her and Kute to the bus terminal. Meanwhile, Nikki admits that Luke is already losing out to Joey's online suitor, Florante Florante. Unknown to her, Luke's confidence comes from the fact that he is Florante Florante himself.
72	"Episode 72"	October 18, 2012	22.8% (1st)
Just when Luke intends to reveal his online identity to Joey, another suitor jumps in and claims his spot. In Nikki's efforts to support Luke, she accidentally reveals his feelings instead. Meanwhile, Maya receives an online friend request from Richard.
73	"Episode 73"	October 19, 2012	23.4% (1st)
Nikki reveals Luke’s secret feelings to Joey, sparking tension between them. Concerned about its impact on Abby, Richard steps in to mend the rift between his children and discusses it with Maya.
74	"Episode 74"	October 22, 2012	23.1% (1st)
Luke and Nikki's enmity continues to escalate, prompting Richard to teach them a lesson by banning them from the house until they settle their conflict. Soon, a funny incident brings the siblings to a reconciliation, and Richard celebrates with an outdoor party. The family camps out for the night, and while everyone is asleep, Abby calls out to her father.
75	"Episode 75"	October 23, 2012	24.9% (1st)
With Luke and Nikki's conflict settled, everyone focuses on the preparations for Abby's birthday party. However, one of Abby's cockatoos, Maimai, is missing. Their search yields nothing and Abby is devastated. Amid the situation, Maya, in her reverie, accidentally blurts out a confession of love to Richard.
76	"Episode 76"	October 24, 2012	22.4% (1st)
Abby sets the remaining cockatoo free in hopes that it will return with its lost partner. The family thinks of ways to distract Abby, but to no avail. Richard wants Abby to face the reality that her pets will never return, and Maya explains it.
77	"Episode 77"	October 25, 2012	25.3% (1st)
In high spirits, Abby suddenly wants to resume her already-cancelled birthday party. Everyone panics until Maya's positivity puts their minds into focus. With two days left before Abby's birthday, the household comes up with an emergency plan.
78	"Episode 78"	October 26, 2012	27.4% (1st)
Abby's birthday party preparations are almost complete, and everyone is excited. Despite the busy atmosphere, Maya experiences the softer side of Richard as he shows concern. Jeff arrives in town and tells Kute about his decision to stay for good.
79	"Episode 79"	October 29, 2012	24.5% (1st)
Everybody finishes the preparations in time for Abby's party. The guests, especially the kids, enjoy the parlor games where Abby shines above all. Maya also meets Richard's parents, who notice the drastic change in his family's disposition in life.
80	"Episode 80"	October 30, 2012	25.1% (1st)
Abby's party finally comes to an enjoyable close. Richard's parents leave, but Doña Esmeralda makes sure to schedule a bonding time with Maya upon hearing so many positive feedbacks about her.
81	"Episode 81"	October 31, 2012	26% (1st)
The whole family is overwhelmed to hear Abby speak. Soon enough, each one looks forward to hearing her talk again. Richard offers Maya a bonus, knowing that this positive turn of events could never have been possible without her.
82	"Episode 82"	November 1, 2012	21.8% (1st)
Abby's psychiatrist informs the Lims that Abby might have begun talking again long before they discovered it. Maya joins the Lims in visiting and giving heartfelt messages to the departed Alexandra.
83	"Episode 83"	November 2, 2012	25.7% (1st)
Nervous for her big day, Maya loses focus during her mock interview with Richard. But that does not mean she is giving up even when the panelists are not impressed by her credentials.
84	"Episode 84"	November 5, 2012	23.4% (1st)
After passing the interview for an internship, an ecstatic Maya relays the good news to her family and friends. As Abby narrates a children's story, Luke records her voice on his phone and lets Maya and the other helpers hear Abby's voice.
85	"Episode 85"	November 6, 2012	24.5% (1st)
Abby's doctor gives Richard and Maya some guidelines that can help the child fully recover. Maya accidentally drops her phone while Abby begs her to play. Meanwhile, Nikki pushes with her plan to expose Iñigo's sham.
86	"Episode 86"	November 7, 2012	25.2% (1st)
Swiftly on her way to recovery, Abby begins to open up and talk with other people outside her home. Meanwhile, Luke slowly finds a way to get close with Joey.
87	"Episode 87"	November 8, 2012	23.9% (1st)
Abby plans to present her scrapbook in class, but Richard fears she might get shy once she stands in front of her teacher and classmates. To personally support Abby, Richard leaves an important meeting while Maya skips her class to cheer for Abby.
88	"Episode 88"	November 9, 2012	25.1% (1st)
Richard tells Maya his appreciation of her effort to support Abby, but he still scolds her for skipping her classes. They soon talk about his plans for Abby's future, prompting Maya to reminisce about her father.
89	"Episode 89"	November 12, 2012	25.9% (1st)
Maya becomes homesick when Simon brings her Teresita's suman and kare-kare. Seeing how sad Maya is, Richard advises her to visit her family once and for all.
90	"Episode 90"	November 13, 2012	26.8% (1st)
Maya leaves for San Nicolas to visit her family. Meanwhile, Luke gets into a fight with Iñigo after he reveals to Joey that he is Florante.
91	"Episode 91"	November 14, 2012	26.8% (1st)
Maya finally arrives in San Nicolas. Still unable to muster the strength to face her family, she proceeds to observe them from a safe distance, until Kute catches her. Niccolo takes shelter at Luke's house after having a fight with his father.
92	"Episode 92"	November 15, 2012	26.2% (1st)
Richard and the rest of the household terribly miss Maya and they try their best to cope with her temporary absence. Meanwhile, Luke is still trying to win Joey's forgiveness for withholding the truth about his online identity from her.
93	"Episode 93"	November 16, 2012	25.5% (1st)
Upon her return to the Lim mansion, Maya shares about her visit to her family's home to Richard.
94	"Episode 94"	November 19, 2012	25.1% (1st)
Richard takes the entire Lim household on a trip to Baguio. While Nikki accepts Luke's challenge to go zip-lining with him, Maya is smitten when Richard shows a gesture of concern.
95	"Episode 95"	November 20, 2012	25.8% (1st)
In Baguio, Richard's children cook up a surprise for him. At the market, Maya is alarmed when Richard attracts an admirer. Richard surprises Maya when he tells her his intention of dating again and the qualities he likes in a woman.
96	"Episode 96"	November 21, 2012	26% (1st)
Maya mistakes Richard's question about her ideal man as a confession of his feelings for her. The Lim children and the rest of the household surprise Richard with a sumptuous feast.
97	"Episode 97"	November 22, 2012	25.5% (1st)
Maya discusses her upcoming internship with Richard. Richard then leaves for Pampanga to meet up with his clients and investigate Fred's alleged transfer to a rival company.
98	"Episode 98"	November 23, 2012	26.1% (1st)
Richard unintentionally leaves his phone at a restaurant where he met with his clients. Maya calls Richard and is surprised to hear an unfamiliar voice on the other line. Niccolo and Nikki employ their own methods to help Luke and Joey reconcile.
99	"Episode 99"	November 26, 2012	24.6% (1st)
Richard's business trip is cut short as he still fails to settle things with Fred. He goes home to find more disappointment this time from Maya. Meanwhile, things begin to work well for Luke as he tries to win back Joey's trust.
100	"Episode 100"	November 27, 2012	24.5% (1st)
Richard chooses not to press charges against Fred anymore. After she receives her recommendation letter from Richard, Maya becomes very curious of its contents.
101	"Episode 101"	November 28, 2012	23.7% (1st)
Richard gives Luke his permission to bring Joey on a date. He also allows Maya to go out with Simon, and tells her that he approves of the young man for her. Likewise, Richard agrees to have dinner with Josephine.
102	"Episode 102"	November 29, 2012	25.6% (1st)
While Maya feels extremely happy after she officially passes as an intern for Time Airways, Richard enjoys his dinner meeting with Josephine. Meanwhile, Luke confesses his feelings for Joey as he serenades her in school.
103	"Episode 103"	November 30, 2012	25.2% (1st)
After Maya informs Richard about her internship schedule, she politely refuses his offer to buy her uniforms. She then becomes bothered with Richard's remarks about his date with Josephine.
104	"Episode 104"	December 3, 2012	23.6% (1st)
Maya decides to focus on preparing for her internship rather than worry herself with Richard's dinner date. While having dinner with G, Richard's mind is pre-occupied with his children's concerns and Maya's internship.
105	"Episode 105"	December 4, 2012	20.7% (1st)
Everything is set for Maya's first day as an intern at Time Airways. Maya confidently and excitedly walks in the Time Airways office as Richard wishes her good luck. Maya's day ends with an exchange of thoughtful text messages with Richard.
106	"Episode 106"	December 5, 2012	22.5% (1st)
Maya finds more inspiration to achieve her dream after meeting Katrina Ruiz, a former flight attendant and a respected Passenger Service Agent Manager at Time Airways.
107	"Episode 107"	December 6, 2012	23.1% (1st)
To show her gratitude, Maya thinks of giving Richard a gift. Joey agrees to go on a group movie date with Luke. Meanwhile, Kute surprises Cho by naming their eatery after him.
108	"Episode 108"	December 7, 2012	22.3% (1st)
Maya manages to pacify a disgruntled client, but her female co-interns lie to their supervisor and take credit for her hard work. Meanwhile, Richard accepts Jie's invitation to attend a gallery opening.
109	"Episode 109"	December 10, 2012	20.4% (1st)
The credit-grabbing incident of her female co-interns is the least of Maya's concerns, as Maya is more interested in showing her gratitude to Richard by giving him a gift.
110	"Episode 110"	December 11, 2012	23.1% (1st)
During their group movie date, Luke and Joey get along well while Niccolo and Nikki continue to annoy each other. Later that night, Maya hurriedly tells Richard that Manang Fe is experiencing difficulty breathing.
111	"Episode 111"	December 12, 2012	21.6% (1st)
Manang Fe's asthma attack compels Richard and Maya to stay in the hospital and monitor her health. As they spend the night there, Maya witnesses how much Richard cares for Manang Fe, thus further fueling her admiration for her boss.
112	"Episode 112"	December 13, 2012	22.5% (1st)
Maya, Richard, and the rest of the household work hand-in-hand for Manang Fe's speedy recovery. However, Maya's efforts to take care of Manang Fe cause her to miss an important training day at her internship.
113	"Episode 113"	December 14, 2012	21.5% (1st)
Taking Richard's earnest concern negatively, Fe becomes convinced that he is planning to replace her. Maya, Doris, and Sabel try to mediate between their slight misunderstanding.
114	"Episode 114"	December 17, 2012	23.6% (1st)
Maya recalls Dandansoy, Manang Fe's favorite song, with the help of Teresita. The Lim children serenade Manang Fe, and much to everyone's surprise, Richard joins his children in cheering up Manang Fe.
115	"Episode 115"	December 18, 2012	22.5% (1st)
Richard unexpectedly meets Ina after driving Maya to the Time Airways office. In San Nicolas, the soft opening of Kute and Jeff's eatery proves to be a success.
116	"Episode 116"	December 19, 2012	21.5% (1st)
Not making it to the airport training and not being able to go home for the holidays make Maya lonely, which Richard immediately notices. However, a slight touch from Richard and the success of her family's eatery turn Maya's sadness in to happiness.
117	"Episode 117"	December 20, 2012	26.3% (1st)
After committing to helping Abby finish making her costume and doing extra work for her internship on the same day, Maya later becomes exhausted and dozes off before she could accomplish her extra work.
118	"Episode 118"	December 21, 2012	22.6% (1st)
Maya rejoices after Ina informs her that she will be one of Time Airways’ representatives for the summit. Richard tells Maya to attend the summit with him. Later, both Richard and Abby want to surprise Maya with a gift.
119	"Episode 119"	December 24, 2012	20.5% (1st)
Feeling bad for not being able to join Richard and Abby in their Christmas shopping, Maya decides to go with Simon instead. Despite their fun shopping day, however, Maya still finds herself filled with sadness as she longs for her family.
120	"Episode 120"	December 25, 2012	16.9% (1st)
Noticing Maya’s aloofness towards him, Richard decides to talk to her before the Simbang Gabi mass. With Richard’s charms, Maya’s defenses crumble once again. Kute is faced with a dilemma as Jeff’s parents express their desire to meet her and Cho.
121	"Episode 121"	December 26, 2012	19.5% (1st)
Maya is overwhelmed with happiness as she finally hears Abby sing in her school play. However, things take a turn when Ina asks her if Richard is dating anyone.
122	"Episode 122"	December 27, 2012	22.1% (1st)
Maya’s gifts for her family finally reach them through Simon and Jeff’s help. Maya is later overjoyed upon receiving Richard and Abby’s surprise gifts. While Maya is sneaking a kiss on her phone’s photo of Richard, Richard suddenly walks in.
123	"Episode 123"	December 28, 2012	24.1% (1st)
An abashed Maya begins to worry about her relationship with Richard now that he possibly knows she has a crush on him.
124	"Episode 124"	December 31, 2012	18.4% (1st)
In an attempt to convince Richard that she does not have a crush on him, Maya follows Sabel's plan and takes pictures of Luke and Joma to show that she has photos of other guys on her phone. Richard asks Liza and Rafi about Maya's peculiar behavior.

=== 2013 ===
Blue denotes the lowest rating, while red denotes the highest. The numbers in parentheses denote the program's ranking among daytime shows based on Total Philippines (urban and rural) household viewership.

No.	Title	Original release date	Kantar Media-TNS Nationwide Ratings
125	"Episode 125"	January 1, 2013	18.7% (1st)
Piqued by curiosity, Richard asks Rafi on her knowledge of Maya’s admiration for him. Not long after, Richard gets the answer from Maya herself after she unknowingly admits her crush on him. Teresita and Mamang persuade Kute to agree to Jeff’s wish.
126	"Episode 126"	January 2, 2013	20.9% (1st)
Her accidental admission of admiration for Richard leaves Maya deeply worried, prompting her to avoid his company on the way to the summit.
127	"Episode 127"	January 3, 2013	24.6% (1st)
Still perturbed with Richard’s discovery of her infatuation for him, Maya deliberately avoids him at the summit. There, she also meets the Time Airways’ vice president for flight operations, James Ventura. Nikki finds out Niccolo’s pretension to her.
128	"Episode 128"	January 4, 2013	24.7% (1st)
As James’ presence and Maya’s deliberate efforts to avoid Richard get at him, Richard brings Maya to tears with his admonishment. Meanwhile, Joey commends Luke for inviting Iñigo to their Christmas party.
129	"Episode 129"	January 7, 2013	25.4% (1st)
Believing that James insulted Maya and is taking advantage of her, Richard scolds her for being naïve and for apparently flirting with the man. Deeply hurt, Maya walks away and goes home by herself.
130	"Episode 130"	January 8, 2013	24.3% (1st)
Maya remains downhearted by Richard’s admonishment. Nevertheless, Ina’s news about her free cabin crew training in Time Airways temporarily spares Maya from dejection. Richard asks Ina about James’ real intention toward Maya. Meanwhile, Nikki, Luke, and their friends finally learn each other’s gift givers.
131	"Episode 131"	January 9, 2013	23.4% (1st)
Following Fe’s advice, Richard allows Maya to go home for Christmas. On the day of her departure, Maya and Richard refuse to bid each other goodbye. Meanwhile, Teresita continues to worry about her daughters, Maya and Kute.
132	"Episode 132"	January 10, 2013	25.1% (1st)
While Maya comes home to San Nicolas, Jeff, Kute, and Cho arrive at the venue of Jeff’s family reunion. Meanwhile, Richard can’t help but remember Maya in the mere mention of her name as the Lim children also express missing Maya’s presence.
133	"Episode 133"	January 11, 2013	24.6% (1st)
Maya is finally spared from her most kept secret as she admits the truth about her employment to Teresita and Mamang. Meanwhile, Richard and Maya continue to resist each other despite their apparent longing for each other.
134	"Episode 134"	January 14, 2013	26.5% (1st)
Maya describes Richard and the people she works with in the Lim household to Teresita and Mamang. Guided by her maternal instincts, Teresita asks if something is troubling Maya, but Maya shrugs off her inquiries. Meanwhile, Kute feels pressured as she and Pocholo meet her son's paternal grandparents for the first time.
135	"Episode 135"	January 15, 2013	26.7% (1st)
Richard and Maya’s misunderstanding affects Richard's behavior around the household, leaving the Lim siblings baffled by their father's mood swings. In San Nicolas, Maya reveals to Teresita her admiration for Richard and their misunderstanding.
136	"Episode 136"	January 16, 2013	28% (1st)
After Maya quits her job as Abby’s nanny, Richard decides to go after Maya in Mindoro and agrees to take his children with him. His secretary Liza manages to book the family’s flight with Time Airways.
137	"Episode 137"	January 17, 2013	27% (1st)
Richard and his children proceed to their trip to Mindoro, and learn that James will be the pilot for their flight. Kute and Cho are surprised to see Maya when they return to San Nicolas with Jeff. Kute becomes angry at Maya for not saying the truth.
138	"Episode 138"	January 18, 2013	30.3% (1st)
Richard and his children arrive in San Nicolas, but lose their way while driving to Maya's house. Maya becomes restless upon learning of the Lim family's arrival. James goes to Maya's house after the cancellation of his flight back to Manila.
139	"Episode 139"	January 21, 2013	28.4% (1st)
After his flight was cancelled, James makes a surprise visit at Maya's house and spends the rest of the day with Maya and her family. Meanwhile, Richard and his children continue to find their way to Maya's hometown.
140	"Episode 140"	January 22, 2013	29.1% (1st)
After finding Maya, Richard and his children finally meet her family. Maya manages to find her way out of Richard's attempt to talk to her at once. However, she fails to talk him out of setting their meeting the following day.
141	"Episode 141"	January 23, 2013	30.5% (1st)
On the day that her family meets Richard and his children, Maya continues to shrug off Richard’s attempts to talk to her. Even so, Richard insists on settling things with Maya, but sparks resentment towards him even more.
142	"Episode 142"	January 24, 2013	30.3% (1st)
Richard accepts Teresita’s invitation for him and his children to celebrate New Year's Eve with Teresita's family. However, Maya resents the idea of spending more time with Richard, despite Kute’s efforts to mediate between them.
143	"Episode 143"	January 25, 2013	31.3% (1st)
As Richard's and Maya's families celebrate the onset of the new year together, he grabs the opportunity to apologize to her. Despite their reconciliation, Maya still plans to resign so she can focus on her training to become a flight attendant.
144	"Episode 144"	January 28, 2013	28.8% (1st)
Upon arriving from San Nicolas, Richard announces Maya's decision to resign to everyone in the Lim household and asks them to keep it a secret from Abby. Richard tells himself that he may never find another person like Maya.
145	"Episode 145"	January 29, 2013	28% (1st)
On her way back to Manila, Maya decides to drop by the Time Airways office after receiving a call from Ina. Maya is not aware that she failed to inform Richard about her side trip, unintentionally making everyone at Lim household worry about her.
146	"Episode 146"	January 30, 2013	25% (1st)
Maya has finally returned to the Lim mansion but immediately faces reprimand from Richard. Meanwhile, Richard consults Abby's doctor about the implications of Maya's resignation to his daughter.
147	"Episode 147"	January 31, 2013	27% (1st)
Maya and Richard have everything planned on the day that Maya reveals her resignation to Abby. However, Abby prematurely learns about it as circumstance gets out of hand. Nevertheless, Maya succeeds in mollifying her most cherished child.
148	"Episode 148"	February 1, 2013	28.5% (1st)
As he begins his search for Abby's new nanny, Richard asks Maya to join him in screening the applicants for her replacement. While Luke expresses his excitement over his upcoming date with Joey, Nikki delights in Niccolo's text messages for her.
149	"Episode 149"	February 4, 2013	28.6% (1st)
Keeping in mind Maya's incomparable ability to take care of Abby, Richard finds it hard to search for a suitable replacement for Maya. Despite going through an arduous application process to be a flight attendant, Maya makes sure to help Richard.
150	"Episode 150"	February 5, 2013	28.1% (1st)
Maya's qualification as a flight attendant of Time Airways earns her a congratulatory hug from Richard. Meanwhile, Luke and Niccolo invite Joey and Nikki respectively to their upcoming school promenade.
151	"Episode 151"	February 6, 2013	28.4% (1st)
Richard goes on with the screening for a new nanny and tells Maya of his plan to bring the shortlisted applicants to his house. On her first day of training, Maya fails to see Richard who left for work earlier than usual.
152	"Episode 152"	February 7, 2013	28.9% (1st)
Deeming that Maya got enlisted in the training school merely through a recommendation, Zenaida dares Maya to prove that she is more than just a pretty face. Upon learning about Maya's predicament, Richard consoles her and commends her attractiveness.
153	"Episode 153"	February 8, 2013	29% (1st)
Maya endures the downside of her recommendation as Zenaida continues to underestimate her competence to become a flight attendant. Seeing Maya in despair, Richard unhesitatingly offers his help and reminds her of being a part of his family.
154	"Episode 154"	February 11, 2013	27.4% (1st)
Richard tours Maya at the Lim Aviation hangar to help her become familiar with aircraft. As luck would have it, one of the planes being maintained is the CRJ-200, the same plane that she needs to study for Ms. Belmonte's class.
155	"Episode 155"	February 12, 2013	24.3% (1st)
Maya continues to excel in her training at Lim Aviation, gradually impressing Zenaida. Richard, on the other hand, gives Maya the option to stay at his house, but Maya sticks to her decision to leave soon.
156	"Episode 156"	February 13, 2013	27.2% (1st)
Maya gets a high score in her exam and delightfully thanks Richard for his huge help in her training. Fe urges Richard to choose among the three remaining nanny applicants as soon as possible.
157	"Episode 157"	February 14, 2013	27.2% (1st)
Gemma, the first of the three remaining nanny applicants, sets foot at the Lim residence to experience the actual work as Abby's nanny. Her presence, however, prompts Maya to consider moving into Eman's place as soon as possible.
158	"Episode 158"	February 15, 2013	28.7% (1st)
The Lim household agrees to celebrate Valentine's Day with a simple dinner at home. Meanwhile, Luke, who feels excited to go on a date with Joey, suddenly learns that Joey's mother desires to go to the prom as well.
159	"Episode 159"	February 18, 2013	27.4% (1st)
On their way to pick up their pre-ordered food, Richard and Maya experience the hassle of going out on Valentine's Day. While the Lim household prepares dinner at home, Richard and Maya find themselves stuck in a couple-kissing event.
160	"Episode 160"	February 19, 2013	28% (1st)
Before Valentine's Day ends, Jeff and Cho surprise Kute with a song number and a delightful dinner at home, while Maya and Richard take pleasure in their friendly dinner date at the Lim residence. Gemma's carelessness nearly puts Abby in danger.
161	"Episode 161"	February 20, 2013	28.7% (1st)
The search for Abby's new nanny continues with the arrival of the soft-spoken Melinda. After her survival swimming test under Ms. Carmela Pacheco, Maya goes to Abby's school to check if Melinda is doing her job well, and bumps into Richard.
162	"Episode 162"	February 21, 2013	28.7% (1st)
Just when Maya and the rest of the Lim household find Melinda suitable to become Abby's new nanny, a surprising news forces Melinda to surrender her application. Meanwhile, Luke learns that Nikki agrees to go with Iñigo to the prom.
163	"Episode 163"	February 22, 2013	29.3% (1st)
Realizing Richard has her best interests at heart, Nikki agrees to meet Iñigo before going to prom with him. Meanwhile, Luisa, the nanny recommended by Richard's mother, begins her first day at the Lim residence.
164	"Episode 164"	February 25, 2013	27.5% (1st)
Richard finally gives Nikki the green light to attend the prom with Iñigo. Despite being uncertain of hiring Luisa as Abby's nanny, Richard finds it best to let Maya go for her to focus on her training as a flight attendant.
165	"Episode 165"	February 26, 2013	27.8% (1st)
While sadness surrounds the entire Lim residence with Maya's nearing departure, Maya spends her last day thanking Richard and his family for everything they have done for her. Richard and the Lim household prepare a surprise farewell party for her.
166	"Episode 166"	February 27, 2013	27.9% (1st)
The whole Lim family surprises Maya with a send-off party, capping it off with a skit about Maya's journey. Despite the joyous atmosphere, Abby feels uneasy after Luisa requires her to allot more time for studying.
167	"Episode 167"	February 28, 2013	26.7% (1st)
While Maya's send-off party is in full swing, Richard learns that Luisa forced Abby to study her lessons to compensate for her low grades in class. Soon after, a heated argument ensues between Richard and Luisa, prompting the latter to quit her job.
168	"Episode 168"	March 1, 2013	24.9% (1st)
Abby wraps up the send-off party by singing "When You Say Nothing At All," which brought Maya in tears while recalling her treasured memories at the Lim residence. The next day, Maya emotionally bids goodbye to the Lim household.
169	"Episode 169"	March 4, 2013	24.5% (1st)
Doris does all she can to make up for Maya's absence and fulfill her responsibilities as Abby's new nanny. As Maya and Eman worry about where to get Maya's dress for the prom, Nikki and Richard think about providing a dress for her.
170	"Episode 170"	March 5, 2013	25.1% (1st)
Thinking that she has found the perfect dress for the prom, Nikki learns that she has bought the same gown as her classmate. Despite his eagerness to help Nikki, Richard begins to feel irrelevant in his daughter's life after she refuses his help.
171	"Episode 171"	March 6, 2013	26.2% (1st)
When Joey fails to fulfill her promise due to a prior commitment, Nikki is compelled to go back to the boutique on her own and pick out a new prom dress. However, Nikki has difficulty making a selection, and she decides to call Maya for help.
172	"Episode 172"	March 7, 2013	24.5% (1st)
Knowing that Maya will refuse to accept the dress that Nikki requested to buy for her, Richard follows Rafi's advice to have it sent to Maya. In spite of Maya's reluctance, Richard manages to make her accept his gift. Oblivious to Iñigo and his friends' plan of revenge against Luke, Nikki and Luke ready themselves for the prom.
173	"Episode 173"	March 8, 2013	27.4% (1st)
The night of Luke and Nikki's prom has finally come. After seeing Maya all primped up, Richard becomes mesmerized by her beauty and compliments her. While Luke enjoys the company of Joey during the cotillion, Iñigo leaves Nikki's side after Niccolo gives him a cutting remark. Volunteering to go after Iñigo, Maya soon discovers his and his friends' plan of revenge against Luke.
174	"Episode 174"	March 11, 2013	27.9% (1st)
Nikki loses her prom date after Iñigo reveals his friends' plan to get back at Luke. Richard tries to comfort his daughter, while Luke and his friends wait to see who will become prom king and queen. Meanwhile, Maya learns more about Richard's past.
175	"Episode 175"	March 12, 2013	26.4% (1st)
Richard and Maya get to spend time together while waiting for Luke and Nikki. As the prom night comes to an end, Luke is left overjoyed after Joey has finally accepted his love. Nikki and Niccolo, on the other hand, become better friends as he helps her keep her mind off IñIgo. Later that night, Maya becomes surprised by Richard's kiss on her cheek.
176	"Episode 176"	March 13, 2013	25.6% (1st)
Deeply fazed by Richard's kiss, Maya calls up Kute to tell her about it. However, Maya fails to word her thoughts and ends up going to bed, restless over the memory of his kiss. Richard, on the other hand, becomes inexplicably joyful.
177	"Episode 177"	March 14, 2013	25.3% (1st)
On the day of her visit to Abby, Maya deliberately finds ways to avoid Richard despite his attempts to see her. Meanwhile, Mamang cancels her birthday celebration to give way to the mayor's council meeting.
178	"Episode 178"	March 15, 2013	24.8% (1st)
Despite Richard's efforts to reach her, Maya continues to avoid him. The Dela Rosa family successfully surprises Mamang for her birthday. After the prom incident, Nikki and Iñigo meet again at school. Luke volunteers to support Joey in revealing their relationship to her mother.
179	"Episode 179"	March 18, 2013	25.5% (1st)
Luke must face Joey's mother Grace and come clean about his relationship with Joey. Though nervous, Luke shows his intentions are pure and promises to keep Grace and Richard's trust. Still overwhelmed by Richard's kiss and efforts to talk with her, Maya has a hard time concentrating on her lessons.
180	"Episode 180"	March 19, 2013	24.8% (1st)
Still greatly perturbed by Richard's recent acts, a sleepless Maya attends her wine class without having eaten anything since the previous night. Maya's failure to spit out wine samples soon makes her tipsy. Coincidentally, Richard arrives just as Maya is being escorted out, and he volunteers to take her home.
181	"Episode 181"	March 20, 2013	26.6% (1st)
While Richard takes the drunken Maya to her place, Maya accidentally confesses to being confused by his kiss. Richard later finds himself having trouble sleeping. Maya, on the other hand, wakes up the next day failing to remember her recent conversation with him. To make things up to the jealous Niccolo, Luke asks his best friend to review lessons with him at his home, where Nikki takes the chance to serve them with her homemade cookies.
182	"Episode 182"	March 21, 2013	25.9% (1st)
Waking up with a fever, Richard heeds Fe's advice and stays at home. He later begins to feel impatient as he waits for Maya to reply to his messages and calls. Following Ryan's advice, Richard becomes unusually nonchalant towards Maya just when she finally decides to respond to him, leaving her baffled by his reaction.
183	"Episode 183"	March 22, 2013	25% (1st)
As much as he wants to go out with Maya, Richard is forced to stay at home as his fever rises up again. Though Richard tries to keep Maya from learning about his current state, Maya eventually learns about his illness from Abby. Meanwhile, Kute talks to Jeff about their son's feelings towards seeing him around other women.
184	"Episode 184"	March 25, 2013	25.2% (1st)
After learning about Richard's fever, Maya drops by the Lim residence to check on him. She gets the chance to ask Richard about the kiss he gave her, and Richard's response leaves Maya in awe.
185	"Episode 185"	March 26, 2013	25.9% (1st)
Out of their utmost concern for Richard, Luke and Nikki hurriedly take a cab home while Maya immediately proceeds to the mansion after her class when they learn about Richard's trip to the hospital. Initially angered by his children's hasty decision, a grateful Richard delights over everyone's care for him.
186	"Episode 186"	March 27, 2013	23.9% (1st)
After Richard gives in to his children's request to spend more time with them, Maya gets to bond with the Lim family over a card game that she has suggested. Later that night, Richard and Maya find more time to spend with each other after she yields to his request to keep him company. Meanwhile, Kute and Teresita worry about their lack of sufficient funds to pay for their family's fare to Manila.
187	"Episode 187"	April 1, 2013	24% (1st)
After Richard asks Maya not to tell Fe that he has broken the bowl, Fe learns about it the following day and immediately asks Doris, Sabel, and even Richard about it. Just when Fe thought she would never learn who the culprit is, Maya calls in and is compelled to tell the truth. Touched by Maya's gesture of treating his wound the night before, Richard surprises Maya by sending her the ingredients for her favorite dish.
188	"Episode 188"	April 2, 2013	25.1% (1st)
Richard completely recovers from his illness, much to his children's delight. Meanwhile, Maya receives a pleasant surprise from Simon, who gives her the rice delicacies from Teresita. Maya later drops by the Lim mansion to share the rice delicacies with the family. After dinner, while Richard and Maya help Abby think of a suitable graduation gift for her classmates, Abby stumbles upon her old slam book. Meanwhile, Niccolo ends up straining his relationship with his best friend after he tries to intercede between Luke and Nikki.
189	"Episode 189"	April 3, 2013	25.5% (1st)
Richard pores over Maya's entry in Abby's old slam book and learns some fascinating details about Maya including her favorite color and her first kiss. After noticing Maya's struggle to hold her training materials together, Richard takes interest in a book strap and inquires with an employee if there are any available in blue or yellow, Maya's favorite colors. Later, Richard receives good news from Abby.
190	"Episode 190"	April 4, 2013	24.1% (1st)
Touched by Richard's thoughtfulness for buying her a book strap, Maya calls him up to thank him and request that he cease sending her gifts. However, Maya is taken by surprise when she finds Richard and Simon waiting for her after class. Meanwhile, Luke finally gives in to Nikki's prodding to reconcile with Niccolo.
191	"Episode 191"	April 5, 2013	23.1% (1st)
After catching up on Maya's life, Simon decides to leave ahead of Richard and Maya. Worried that Simon might have felt out of place, Maya apologizes to Simon but ends up getting teased for her unusual closeness to Richard. As Richard takes Maya home, he tells her of his unwillingness to have her avoid him again and, in turn, she tells him of the comfort she feels with their current situation. The following day, Maya becomes surprised to receive a bouquet of flowers from Richard.
192	"Episode 192"	April 8, 2013	24.4% (1st)
Maya is left speechless when Richard calls shortly after she has received the bouquet of flowers to ask her out on a date. Trying to hide her excitement from Eman, Maya phones Kute and informs her of Richard's invitation. While Kute gives the nervous Maya advice and reminds her to be prepared for the possible outcome of her date with Sir Chief, Ryan encourages the reluctant Richard to push his luck with Maya right away. Meanwhile, delighted after passing PSU's entrance exam, Luke's spirit wanes when he learns that Joey has failed in it.
193	"Episode 193"	April 9, 2013	27.6% (1st)
Richard's plan to take Maya on a cruise ship date gets spoiled after they arrive late for the trip. In her rush to catch the cruise, Maya inadvertently loses the other pair of her shoe, amusing Sir Chief when he sees her with only one shoe on. Shortly after, Richard is pushed to scare off a bystander who is looking at Maya in a suspicious way while they are both preoccupied with looking for her missing shoe.
194	"Episode 194"	April 10, 2013	26.3% (1st)
With their date failing to turn out according to plan, Maya begins to worry about Richard's thoughts over the whole thing. Richard manages to appease a troubled Maya by asking a musician at the bay to play a song for her. However, Richard later catches her off guard when he suddenly poses the question regarding her readiness to have a boyfriend. Meanwhile, Kute learns about Jeff's plan to court someone without taking Cho by surprise.
195	"Episode 195"	April 11, 2013	24.1% (1st)
Richard attempts to kiss Maya good night, but gets interrupted when Eman suddenly appears from nowhere. Still elated over her date with Richard, Maya makes a phone call to Kute and ends up hearing Teresita on the other line. Though surprised, Maya immediately comes up with an excuse for calling. The following day at the training center, Maya earns curious stares from the other trainees as Richard picks her up for lunch.
196	"Episode 196"	April 12, 2013	25.1% (1st)
Richard runs into his former colleagues as he takes Maya out for lunch. Seeing how the sophisticated ladies drool over Richard, Maya cannot help but feel restless. Later, Maya's excitement to tell Kute about her date with Sir Chief dies down when Kute mentioned about Richard's children. Troubled by how the kids might feel once they learn that she and Richard are dating, Maya politely turns down Abby's invitation for her to join the Lims' family dinner.
197	"Episode 197"	April 15, 2013	23.8% (1st)
While they accompany Abby to the mall to buy graduation gifts for her classmates, Richard finds himself amused by Maya's way of showing her concern for Abby. Although bothered by how Richard's children might feel once they learn that they are seeing each other, Maya gives in to Abby's request to go home with her and Richard to help her wrap her gifts for her classmates. Meanwhile, Nikki and Niccolo team up to brighten Luke's mood as Joey continues to ignore his texts and calls.
198	"Episode 198"	April 16, 2013	23.4% (1st)
Realizing that their growing friendship might affect her relationship with the Lim children, Maya chooses to avoid Richard. Bothered, Richard admits to Manang Fe that he and Maya have been dating. Manang Fe gives Richard her advice regarding Maya's concern on the children's take regarding their romantic involvement. The following day, Abby excitedly wakes everyone up at the Lim household, including Maya, to prepare for her graduation.
199	"Episode 199"	April 17, 2013	25.1% (1st)
It is Abby's graduation day and the Lims watch with bated breath as Abby turns still just when she is just about to deliver her speech. Upon seeing Maya's gesture of encouragement, Abby gains the confidence to speak and her heartwarming speech earns standing ovation from the crowd. Later, Richard gets the chance to talk to Maya and appease her worries on what the children might think of their growing relationship.
200	"Episode 200"	April 18, 2013	26.6% (1st)
Fe and the rest of the helpers join the Lim family in celebrating Abby's graduation. While everyone is in a festive mood, Luke receives a call from Joey, who tells him that she wants to break up with him. Distraught by Joey's sudden decision, Luke's mood changes as he returns to the celebration, and this stirs up his family's curiosity and concern.
201	"Episode 201"	April 19, 2013	25.9% (1st)
Maya comes close to fulfilling her dream as she prepares for her first observation flight in Time Airways. Before she boards the plane, Richard surprises her with a gift. Meanwhile, hoping for a second chance, Luke reaches out to Joey through a heartfelt e-mail.
202	"Episode 202"	April 22, 2013	26% (1st)
On board Time Airways for her initial observation flight, Maya's natural wit enables her to pacify two kids involved in a petty fight. As soon as she returns to Manila, Maya shares her flight experience to Richard who gladly picks her up at the airport. Meanwhile, Luke's unusual silence continues, prompting Nikki to ask Niccolo to talk to him.
203	"Episode 203"	April 23, 2013	24.4% (1st)
Luke tries to reach out to Joey in school, but she remains indifferent to his efforts. Agitated, Luke takes out his frustration on his previous rival Iñigo, much to Nikki and Niccolo's surprise. Richard rushes home after learning about the incident, but fails to convince Luke to talk about what triggered the fight and the reason for Joey's breakup with him.
204	"Episode 204"	April 24, 2013	24% (1st)
Just as Richard's unwavering support for her makes Maya's friendship with him flourish, Maya chances upon a former acquaintance and admirer as she arrives at the airport for her next training flight. Meanwhile, as the family looks forward to his graduation, Luke continues to feel troubled by Joey's indifference after their breakup.
205	"Episode 205"	April 25, 2013	24% (1st)
Oblivious that his absence has given Capt. James Ventura the chance to take Maya home and share a meal with her, Richard becomes alarmed as soon as he learns about Maya's encounter with her previous admirer, who would also be piloting on her next training flight. Meanwhile, Luke remains melancholic during and after his graduation despite his family's, friends', and even Joey's efforts to console him.
206	"Episode 206"	April 26, 2013	23% (1st)
As their conflicting schedules prevent them from spending quality time together, Richard struggles on how to finally confess his feelings to Maya—who is now working with his rival, Capt. James Ventura. Maya, on the other hand, is prompted to steer clear of Capt. Ventura as she weighs her feelings for Richard. Meanwhile, Richard gets upset after learning that Luke, who is deeply affected by his breakup with Joey, has gotten allergies due to drinking alcohol.
207	"Episode 207"	April 29, 2013	26.6% (1st)
After Maya sent him multiple text messages, Richard finally calls her up and apologizes to her for constantly needing her help with his children. Maya, in turn, appeases Richard's worries and expresses her happiness for having him in her life. After bidding each other good night, Richard and Maya are both surprised when they spontaneously expressed their feelings for each other. Meanwhile, Kute catches Jeff on a date, and quickly explains that she is not spying on him.
208	"Episode 208"	April 30, 2013	25.2% (1st)
After expressing their love for each other over the phone, Maya quickly feels mixed emotions and seeks advice from Kute while Richard recounts his recent conversation with Maya to Rafi, who persuades him to express his love for Maya in person. The following day, as Maya evaluates her feelings for Richard, she is presented with a series of situations, which makes her learn about the difficulties of balancing a career and a relationship. Meanwhile, Richard gives Luke a heartfelt advice on relationships as he brings his son to his alma mater PUS, the place where he also met his beloved wife Alex.
209	"Episode 209"	May 1, 2013	25.8% (1st)
Richard finally gains the courage to personally confess his real feelings for Maya as he takes her on a surprise picnic date inside the private grounds of his alma mater. While Maya shares her fear of losing what she has gained, Richard expresses his willingness to wait until she is ready to commit in a relationship. Meanwhile, Nikki and Abby are surprised to find Luke in high spirits and back to his usual self after his heart-to-heart talk with Richard.
210	"Episode 210"	May 2, 2013	27% (1st)
After telling Maya about the instances that made him realize that he has feelings for her, Richard spontaneously holds her hands as he assures her that they would return to her mother's most romantic place if she promises never to fight with him again. In the province, just when Maya's family is ready to leave for their flight to Manila, an unexpected problem at their eatery arises and compels Kute to stay behind. Meanwhile, Luke shows more progress in recovering from the breakup as he turns his attention to his studies.
211	"Episode 211"	May 3, 2013	25.8% (1st)
As Maya's family arrives in Manila in time for Maya's graduation, Kute misses the flight and struggles to rebook her flight without the promo fare. Teresita begins to notice Richard and Maya's unusual closeness as the family finally reunites, while Abby and Richard prepare special plans for Maya's graduation. Meanwhile, after Luke's talk with his father, Nikki notices her brother's restored high spirits.
212	"Episode 212"	May 6, 2013	25.8% (1st)
As Teresita worries that Kute may not make it to Maya's graduation, Jeff assures her that Kute will arrive and that she has purchased a ferry ticket to Manila. Meanwhile, Maya spends the day with her family at Luneta Park. When Richard arrives to bring snacks for them, Teresita becomes more suspicious about the real score between him and Maya.
213	"Episode 213"	May 7, 2013	25.2% (1st)
The Lims warmly welcome Maya and her family to their residence. As Richard shows his guests around the house, Teresita continues to notice his closeness to her daughter and becomes uneasy with it.
214	"Episode 214"	May 8, 2013	23.9% (1st)
As Richard and Maya take her family to the amusement park, Richard finally grabs the opportunity to talk to Teresita and confess to her the real score between him and her daughter.
215	"Episode 215"	May 9, 2013	25% (1st)
Maya learns Richard has told Teresita about their courtship. That night, Teresita talks to Maya, who admits her fears are holding her back. Teresita reassures her of Richard’s sincerity and the genuineness of his love.
216	"Episode 216"	May 10, 2013	26.7% (1st)
Everyone is ready for Maya's graduation, except Kute who is still on her way to Manila. Maya worries that her sister will not make it on time, so Richard personally fetches Kute from the bus station. However, the two are slowed down by heavy traffic, forcing them to ride the public train instead.
217	"Episode 217"	May 13, 2013	19.5% (1st)
Still with no Kute in sight, Maya is about to lose heart as the program proceeds to the presentation of graduates. However, Kute manages to arrive in time to pin the flight attendant's wing on Maya's lapel and to tell the whole family how Richard's efforts saved the day. Maya later thanks Richard for his help, but surprises him with an unexpected response.
218	"Episode 2018"	May 14, 2013	24.9% (1st)
Everyone surprises Maya with a small feast to celebrate her graduation. During the get-together, Kute notices the apparent sparkle in Maya's and Richard's eyes and asks her sister about it. Back in San Nicolas, Jeff meets a beautiful customer named Sarah.
219	"Episode 219"	May 15, 2013	22.3% (1st)
Maya's graduation celebration soon comes to an end. Richard leaves with a promise to Kute that he will not let Maya forego her dreams because of him. However, Richard is unsure if Maya's earlier affirmation of love meant that they are officially together. On the other hand, Maya thrills Kute with some good news.
220	"Episode 220"	May 16, 2013	24.8% (1st)
When the Lims visit Alex's grave on Mother's Day, Richard finds the chance to talk to his late wife about his newfound love. After bidding her family farewell, Maya comes across James, who surprises her with a special graduation gift.
221	"Episode 221"	May 17, 2013	25.3% (1st)
The news of her first flight to San Nicolas excites Maya, but Richard's sudden elusiveness toward her stifles her happiness.
222	"Episode 222"	May 20, 2013	26.1% (1st)
Maya's first flight as an official stewardess heaps up with surprises as she chances upon her friend Don Julio aboard the plane and receives an overwhelming welcome from her family and neighbors at the airport. To top it all off, Richard goes to great lengths for his own surprise for Maya.
223	"Episode 223"	May 21, 2013	24.9% (1st)
At her mother's favorite place, Maya finally settles her misunderstanding with Richard and affirms her love for him. Meanwhile, Nikki becomes increasingly annoyed at Niccolo and Aira.
224	"Episode 224"	May 22, 2013	26.9% (1st)
Finally officially together, Richard asks Maya to stop calling him "Sir Chief." Maya agrees and calls him "babe" instead. Meanwhile, Luke scolds Nikki for speaking badly of Niccolo's friends.
225	"Episode 225"	May 23, 2013	26% (1st)
Maya and Richard decide to keep their relationship a secret from his children until all of them are ready for the news. Nevertheless, Richard happily shares the tidings to Fe and Rafi.
226	"Episode 226"	May 24, 2013	27.1% (1st)
Richard and Maya's secret relationship becomes at risk of being exposed when Nikki calls Richard and overhears Maya at the other end of the line.
227	"Episode 227"	May 27, 2013	22.1% (1st)
As Richard spends a day with his kids, he gets an idea about how they would feel if Maya had a suitor. Meanwhile, he and Maya plan how they will celebrate their first week as a couple, and Maya consults Rafi about an ingenious idea.
228	"Episode 228"	May 28, 2013	26.2% (1st)
Maya painstakingly prepares for her first week celebration dinner with Richard—only to receive an unexpected reaction from him. Meanwhile, Nikki learns that Niccolo intends to court his best friend.
229	"Episode 229"	May 29, 2013	23.8% (1st)
Maya's efforts to prepare a first week celebration dinner for Richard becomes unappreciated as he forgets about the event. Soon, Richard realizes his mistake while Maya begins to understand the compromises she has to make in a relationship.
230	"Episode 230"	May 30, 2013	25% (1st)
After opening up their feelings to each other and accepting their differences, Richard and Maya finally settle their misunderstanding. Soon, Richard breaks some news to his children. Meanwhile, Kute contemplates on her next step in hopes of providing a better future for Cho.
231	"Episode 231"	May 31, 2013	25.2% (1st)
Kute finally decides to return working as a seawoman to ensure Cho's future. Meanwhile, Maya receives her first paycheck and happily shares it to her family. Everyone also excitedly prepares for the upcoming beach vacation.
232	"Episode 232"	June 3, 2013	25.8% (1st)
While the Lims relish their time at the beach, a curious Nikki catches Maya unprepared when she suddenly asks the latter about Richard's new girlfriend. Meanwhile, with Jeff's help, Kute finally tells Cho of her plans to return to work on board a ship.
233	"Episode 233"	June 4, 2013	26.3% (1st)
Maya receives a surprise birthday treat from the Lims. However, she constantly finds herself in awkward situations as the Lim children continue to mention about Richard's mysterious girlfriend. Seeing Cho and Kute struggle with the thought of living away from each other, Jeff reaches a decision that surprises Kute. Meanwhile, Luke blames Nikki for instigating a conflict between Niccolo and Aira.
234	"Episode 234"	June 5, 2013	25.7% (1st)
The sight of Maya and Richard together gives Nikki a notion that Maya is her father's new girlfriend. On the other hand, Richard plans to reveal the big news to his children once they return to Manila. Meanwhile, Kute argues with Jeff as the latter resolves to leave for Dubai without consulting her first.
235	"Episode 235"	June 6, 2013	26.4% (1st)
Richard resolves to delay telling his children about his relationship with Maya after noticing Nikki's unusual silence. This comes as a relief for Maya as she remains anxious about how Richard's children will accept her as their father's girlfriend. Meanwhile, Teresita finally decides to talk to Jeff about how to best solve their family's problem without compromising Cho's welfare.
236	"Episode 236"	June 7, 2013	26.2% (1st)
Richard leaves home for an official business. To ease his worry on his kids, Maya volunteers to check up on them while he is gone. Maya's presence in their home becomes unpleasant for Nikki who still suspects that Maya is their father's girlfriend.
237	"Episode 237"	June 10, 2013	24.3% (1st)
Just when Nikki is convinced that there is nothing going on between her father and Maya, Luke insists that her suspicions might be true. Meanwhile, Kute formally turns down her job offer in the shipping agency.
238	"Episode 238"	June 11, 2013	23.5% (1st)
Nikki gets upset when Aira mentions that she is close to accepting Niccolo as her boyfriend. Upon arriving home, Nikki straightforwardly asks a question that leaves Maya dumfounded. With Maya's urging, Kute finally patches things up with Jeff.
239	"Episode 239"	June 12, 2013	22.9% (1st)
As the Lim children's sudden questioning puts Maya in a tight spot, Richard resolves to return home to explain everything to his children. Meanwhile, Fe and the house helpers think of ways to make the Lim children remember their good times with Maya.
240	"Episode 240"	June 13, 2013	19.6% (1st)
Richard's revelation of his relationship with Maya elicits diverse reactions from his children. Meanwhile, Kute suddenly turns apathetic during Jeff's farewell party in San Nicolas.
241	"Episode 241"	June 14, 2013	23.9% (1st)
Richard relates to Maya about his children's reaction to their relationship and invites her for dinner with them at the mansion. Maya agrees, but feels nervous about facing Luke and Nikki. Tension arises as Richard arrives home with Maya.
242	"Episode 242"	June 17, 2013	24.2% (1st)
Luke and Nikki's apparent lack of enthusiasm makes Maya feel extremely uncomfortable during their dinner. With that, Maya ends up with a decision to prevent further conflict between Richard and his children.
243	"Episode 243"	June 18, 2013	22.8% (1st)
Heeding Maya's wish, Richard tries his best to keep a healthy relationship with his kids. However, Luke and Nikki's aloofness grows deeper upon seeing Richard buy a ladies' bag during their bonding time.
244	"Episode 244"	June 19, 2013	27% (1st)
As the first day of school draws near, Abby gets excited especially that Maya will be there for her. Maya, on the other hand, hesitates to join the Lim family in dropping Abby off at school.
245	"Episode 245"	June 20, 2013	23.4% (1st)
After learning how Aira's father belittled Niccolo when he presented himself as a suitor, Luke comes to a realization. He then invites Maya to join them in fetching Abby and to have ice cream with them. Luke takes the opportunity to speak with Maya.
246	"Episode 246"	June 21, 2013	28.7% (1st)
While everyone feels happy about Maya and Luke's reconciliation, Nikki continues to feel uncomfortable toward Maya and Richard's relationship. Nikki calls up Rafi to confide her predicament.
247	"Episode 247"	June 24, 2013	23% (1st)
Having no one to turn to in the family, Nikki calls her grandmother to disclose her sentiments about Richard's relationship with Maya. Surprised with his mother's sudden questioning about his girlfriend, an upset Richard asks Nikki to talk to him.
248	"Episode 248"	June 25, 2013	25.2% (1st)
Nikki goes missing after being reprimanded by Richard, causing Maya to find herself at fault. Knowing his children all too well, Richard finds Nikki at the cemetery, in his departed wife's mausoleum.
249	"Episode 249"	June 26, 2013	23.2% (1st)
The Lim children plan an early Father's Day celebration at the mall. Although reluctant, Nikki invites Maya to join them through Fe. At the mall, Luke finds ways on making Nikki get close with Maya.
250	"Episode 250"	June 28, 2013	24.2% (1st)
The Lim family's early Father's Day celebration comes to an end, but before going home, the Lim children give their final surprise for Richard--to spend the rest of the night on a date with Maya.
251	"Episode 251"	July 1, 2013	24.1% (1st)
Richard and Maya affirm their relationship to their friends and co-workers.
252	"Episode 252"	July 2, 2013	24.7% (1st)
As their paths cross once again, Nikki finds herself embroiled in a tiff with Aria because she disapproves of the girl for Niccolo.
253	"Episode 253"	July 3, 2013	23.4% (1st)
Richard and Maya go on their first out-of-town trip as a couple.
254	"Episode 254"	July 4, 2013	22.5% (1st)
After making a few mistakes on the way to the launch of Lim Aviation’s hangar, Maya considers backing out of the event.
255	"Episode 255"	July 5, 2013	24.6% (1st)
Maya obliviously becomes the belle of the ball at the launch of Lim Aviation’s hangar.
256	"Episode 256"	July 8, 2013	22.8% (1st)
At the Lim Aviation hangar launch, Richard meets with his business colleagues and officially introduces Maya as his girlfriend.
257	"Episode 257"	July 9, 2013	21.9% (1st)
Talking with Aira on the phone, Niccolo becomes irritated to learn that she dislikes Nikki because she thinks that Nikki has a secret crush on him.
258	"Episode 258"	July 10, 2013	22.3% (1st)
Richard and Maya's picture from the launch of Lim Aviation’s hangar hits the newspaper headlines, eliciting much joy and pride in their relatives and friends.
259	"Episode 259"	July 11, 2013	22.1% (1st)
As Maya and Richard celebrate their first month as a couple, Maya finds herself scrambling for ideas on what to do and where to go.
260	"Episode 260"	July 12, 2013	22% (1st)
Nikki becomes sad after all her girl friends fail to come for the planned slumber party at her house.
261	"Episode 261"	July 15, 2013	23.1% (1st)
Pushing through with her slumber party with Maya and Eman, Nikki admits she has feelings for someone she has known for a long time.
262	"Episode 262"	July 16, 2013	23% (1st)
Nikki makes Eman and Maya promise to keep her secret from everyone, even her dad.
263	"Episode 263"	July 17, 2013	20.9% (1st)
Maya, Nikki, and the others continue playing in the rain while Richard records everything on his camcorder.
264	"Episode 264"	July 18, 2013	23.9% (1st)
Esmeralda and Roberto finally arrive at the Lim mansion to know more about Richard's new girlfriend.
265	"Episode 265"	July 19, 2013	23% (1st)
News of Esmeralda’s decision to postpone their plan to have dinner worries Maya, whose anxiety soon turns into delight when she learns of Roberto’s opinion of her.
266	"Episode 266"	July 22, 2013	23.5% (1st)
After Abby gets a high fever, Esmeralda reprimands Richard for letting his children play in the rain.
267	"Episode 267"	July 23, 2013	23% (1st)
Agreeing to meet Richard’s mother by herself, a nervous Maya eventually opens up to Esmeralda about her life.
268	"Episode 268"	July 24, 2013	22.2% (1st)
Esmeralda interrupts Maya from talking about her life further, wishing to continue their conversation some other time.
269	"Episode 269"	July 25, 2013	23% (1st)
Maya drops by Richard's house but feels uneasy about Esmeralda's stern looks.
270	"Episode 270"	July 26, 2013	22% (1st)
Always critical of Maya, Esmeralda is advised by Fe and Richard to keep an open mind and give her son's girlfriend a chance.
271	"Episode 271"	July 29, 2013	19.8% (1st)
Concerned for his son's family, Roberto advises Richard against marrying Maya.
272	"Episode 272"	July 30, 2013	23.5% (1st)
The misunderstanding between father and son becomes noticeable at home when Roberto and Richard apparently argue about business matters at the dining table.
273	"Episode 273"	July 31, 2013	23.3% (1st)
After Richard confides to her, Esmeralda tells Maya about the real reason behind his quarrel with Roberto, thinking that Maya is already well-aware of it.
274	"Episode 274"	August 1, 2013	22.4% (1st)
Richard apologizes to Maya for hiding the truth about his disagreement with his father.
275	"Episode 275"	August 2, 2013	23.2% (1st)
In her attempt to break the ice between her and Roberto, Maya cooks a special dish for her boyfriend's father.
276	"Episode 276"	August 5, 2013	21.5% (1st)
Maya prepares a special dish for Roberto as she continues to try to win his approval.
277	"Episode 277"	August 6, 2013	22.2% (1st)
Luke and Joey finally talk things over and agree to stay friends.
278	"Episode 278"	August 7, 2013	22.3% (1st)
Roberto follows Esmeralda's advice and tries to make it up to Richard by inviting the whole family out to lunch.
279	"Episode 279"	August 8, 2013	22.1% (1st)
Roberto upsets Richard after the former refuses to apologize for excluding Maya in his reservation at the Royal Eats.
280	"Episode 280"	August 9, 2013	22.8% (1st)
Still unable to make peace with his son, Roberto decides to leave Richard's mansion.
281	"Episode 281"	August 12, 2013	23.1% (1st)
Richard's disagreement with Roberto is starting to affect his relationship with Maya.
282	"Episode 282"	August 13, 2013	21.9% (1st)
Maya and Richard continue to give each other the cold shoulder after last night's disagreement.
283	"Episode 283"	August 14, 2013	21.4% (1st)
Unable to put up with Roberto, Esmeralda leaves him and transfers hotel rooms to have some time for herself.
284	"Episode 284"	August 15, 2013	22.7% (1st)
A day before Richard's birthday, Esmeralda decides to return to the hotel room she shares with Roberto.
285	"Episode 285"	August 16, 2013	21.9% (1st)
Thanks to Maya and Esmeralda's persistence, Richard's birthday party at the orphanage finally takes place.
286	"Episode 286"	August 19, 2013	24.1% (1st)
As Richard's birthday party continues, Richard and Roberto remain determined to patch things up with their respective partners.
287	"Episode 287"	August 20, 2013	19.6% (1st)
Richard and Roberto serenade Maya and Esmeralda.
288	"Episode 288"	August 21, 2013	22.6% (1st)
Richard prepares to ask Maya the biggest question of her life, and only Roberto and Raffy know about it.
289	"Episode 289"	August 22, 2013	21.4% (1st)
Richard tells Teresita and his children about his plans to propose to Maya.
290	"Episode 290"	August 23, 2013	21.9% (1st)
Maya finally gets the chance to formally introduce Teresita and Conching to Richard's parents when they all get together for a special dinner.
291	"Episode 291"	August 26, 2013	24.9% (1st)
Not wanting Conchita and Esmeralda’s hostility toward each other to get in the way of Richard and Maya’s engagement, Roberto and Teresita tell them Richard’s plan of proposing to Maya.
292	"Episode 292"	August 27, 2013	21.4% (1st)
As suspicion and intrigue get the better of Maya, she decides to spy on Richard during one of his supposed meetings.
293	"Episode 293"	August 28, 2013	22% (1st)
As Eman's revelation starts to dawn on Maya, she begins to wonder if is she is ready to get married.
294	"Episode 294"	August 29, 2013	23.8% (1st)
Everyone is filled with expectations as Maya and Richard head out to a fancy restaurant for a special dinner date.
295	"Episode 295"	August 30, 2013	22.1% (1st)
Richard decides to make his proposal a family affair, especially now that his proposal is out in the open.
296	"Episode 296"	September 2, 2013	21.1% (1st)
Seeing Nikki and Nicolo's undeniable chemistry in their music video, Luke becomes worried and confronts them if they have feelings for each other.
297	"Episode 297"	September 3, 2013	21.8% (1st)
Richard finally asks Maya's hand in marriage.
298	"Episode 298"	September 4, 2013	22.6% (1st)
Maya and Richard's families get busy as they prepare for Richard's "pamamanhikan."
299	"Episode 299"	September 5, 2013	21.9% (1st)
The Lim family arrives in San Nicolas for Richard's "pamamanhikan."
300	"Episode 300"	September 6, 2013	23% (1st)
The Lim family starts to feel at home in San Nicolas as Maya and her family give them a tour of the town and describe how life is like in their little community.
301	"Episode 301"	September 9, 2013	21.5% (1st)
The entire neighborhood is buzzing with activity as the day of Richard's "pamamanhikan" finally arrives.
302	"Episode 302"	September 10, 2013	19.9% (1st)
Everyone celebrates as Maya and Richard formally announce their engagement.
303	"Episode 303"	September 11, 2013	22.7% (1st)
Celebration turns into tragedy when the Dela Rosas wake up the following morning to discover Conchita has quietly passed away in her sleep.
304	"Episode 304"	September 12, 2013	22% (1st)
As mourners arrive to pay their last respects to Conchita, the Dela Rosas find themselves dealing with all sorts of superstitions about the dead.
305	"Episode 305"	September 13, 2013	24.1% (1st)
Even after laying Conchita to rest, Teresita is still struggling to cope with the pain of loss.
306	"Episode 306"	September 16, 2013	21.4% (1st)
Richard hires a private investigator to look for Arturo Dela Rosa, Maya's estranged biological father.
307	"Episode 307"	September 17, 2013	19.6% (1st)
Nikki is exhilarated when Nicolo calls her and promises to treat her out to celebrate the success of their music video.
308	"Episode 308"	September 18, 2013	20.7% (1st)
All of Maya's hard work finally pays off when Time Airways gives her a new contract and offers her a regular position.
309	"Episode 309"	September 19, 2013	20.4% (1st)
To celebrate Maya's regularization at Time Airways, Richard plans a short weekend trip to Ilocos.
310	"Episode 310"	September 20, 2013	21% (1st)
Nikki is overjoyed when Richard finally agrees to let her join West Teatro's camping activity.
311	"Episode 311"	September 23, 2013	20.5% (1st)
Nicolo's little slip of the tongue creates a problem for Nikki as she now starts to feel awkward around Amiel.
312	"Episode 312"	September 24, 2013	19.9% (1st)
Before things could get even more awkward, Nikki finally tells Amiel that she does not have a crush on him and the whole issue was just something she perpetuated to satisfy Luke's curiosity.
313	"Episode 313"	September 25, 2013	19.9% (1st)
Just as planned, Luke and Nicolo tag along with Nikki on her camping trip with West Teatro.
314	"Episode 314"	September 26, 2013	19.6% (1st)
Richard feels increasingly worried for Nikki after she fails to return his call and to tell him what happened.
315	"Episode 315"	September 27, 2013	20.9% (1st)
Friends of Maya get excited when they hear that she and Richard are finally going to meet a wedding planner.
316	"Episode 316"	September 30, 2013	18.7% (1st)
On the first day of meeting with the wedding planner, Maya is taken aback upon learning of Richard's desire to move the wedding on a sooner date.
317	"Episode 317"	October 1, 2013	19.5% (1st)
Due to Maya's health condition and the heavy traffic which Nikki and Luke encountered, Richard ends up attending the wedding with Abby.
318	"Episode 318"	October 2, 2013	19% (1st)
Upon getting enough information about Arturo Dela Rosa, Richard decides to fly to Cebu to locate him personally.
319	"Episode 319"	October 3, 2013	20.3% (1st)
Richard wastes no time on his purpose for flying all the way to Cebu to find Arturo.
320	"Episode 320"	October 4, 2013	21% (1st)
Richard asks Arturo to attend Maya’s upcoming wedding and says how much Maya misses him.
321	"Episode 321"	October 7, 2013	20.7% (1st)
Teresita immediately flies to Manila to check on Maya. A day after her arrival, however, Maya is transferred to the intensive care unit due to her deteriorating health condition. Despite her promise to Luke, Nikki loses the guts to turn down Amiel.
322	"Episode 322"	October 8, 2013	19.3% (1st)
Maya remains at the ICU while she continues to suffer from dengue. Despite her responsibilities at the Chibugan and Cho's school activities, Kute decides to leave for Manila to personally check on her sick sister.
323	"Episode 323"	October 9, 2013	19.8% (1st)
After spending several days in the intensive care unit, Maya is finally advised to transfer to her private room upon getting positive results from her test.
324	"Episode 324"	October 10, 2013	21% (1st)
Arturo gets the chance to speak with Teresita as they accidentally meet at the chapel of the hospital.
325	"Episode 325"	October 11, 2013	18.4% (1st)
Maya continues to recover from her near-fatal condition and goes home eventually. Despite Maya’s recuperation, Richard and Teresita remain perturbed as they try to keep Maya from knowing about Arturo’s visit.
326	"Episode 326"	October 14, 2013	19.4% (1st)
Despite her apprehensions, Teresita allows Maya to meet with her father. Kute, on the other hand, loses control her temper upon learning of Arturo's return as she remains haunted by his inexplicable disappearance 15 years ago.
327	"Episode 327"	October 15, 2013	21.8% (1st)
After 15 long years, Maya finally resolves her unanswered questions about Arturo's sudden disappearance.
328	"Episode 328"	October 16, 2013	18.4% (1st)
After being confined for several days, Maya reports to work despite Richard's insistence that she stay home until she is fully recovered. Meanwhile, Kute continues to convince Teresita to disregard the idea of crossing paths again with Arturo.
329	"Episode 329"	October 17, 2013	18.7% (1st)
Kute remains troubled about Teresita's ceaseless interest on Maya's meeting with Arturo.
330	"Episode 330"	October 18, 2013	19.2% (1st)
While the others are busy keeping themselves in shape for Maya and Richard's wedding, the couple signs up for a marriage counseling seminar and selects wedding rings.
331	"Episode 331"	October 21, 2013	18.5% (1st)
The Dela Rosas arrive in Manila for the trial fitting of their wedding attire.
332	"Episode 332"	October 22, 2013	19% (1st)
Despite her trust to Richard, Maya becomes bothered by the fickleness of people in marriage after attending the second day of the seminar.
333	"Episode 333"	October 23, 2013	18.4% (1st)
Maya becomes paranoid about Richard's activities and new acquaintances as she remains bothered about what Monica and Xander went through.
334	"Episode 334"	October 24, 2013	19.6% (1st)
Still troubled by her knowledge of Xander's infidelity, Maya fails to control her emotions as she fears losing Richard. Meanwhile, Esmeralda and Roberto try to top each other's plans for Richard's bachelor party and Maya's bridal shower.
335	"Episode 335"	October 25, 2013	18.6% (1st)
Maya's fear of losing Richard banishes with his reaffirmation of love.
336	"Episode 336"	October 28, 2013	18.6% (1st)
Despite her effort to evade the issue, Maya is left with no other choice but to turn to her mother to know more about intimacy and lovemaking.
337	"Episode 337"	October 29, 2013	19.8% (1st)
Luke and Raffi arrive together from Singapore, leaving their family more excited for Richard and Maya's wedding.
338	"Episode 338"	October 30, 2013	19.3% (1st)
Due to Richard's restrictions, his stag party turns out to be a lifeless gathering of all his male family members and friends.
339	"Episode 339"	October 31, 2013	16.9% (1st)
After 15 years, Teresita's anger towards Arturo begins to fade upon learning through Richard that he never lost the eagerness to check on them once in a while despite their situation.
340	"Episode 340"	November 1, 2013	17.5% (1st)
Due to a conflict in her work schedule, Maya fails to go to San Nicolas in time for All Souls Day.
341	"Episode 341"	November 4, 2013	19.1% (1st)
Teresita secretly meets with Arturo with hopes of finding solutions to her unanswered questions.
342	"Episode 342"	November 5, 2013	20.1% (1st)
Richard and Maya gather the principal sponsors of their wedding.
343	"Episode 343"	November 6, 2013	18.3% (1st)
Realizing that Maya is still bothered by Teresita's text message, Richard arranges special surprises for Maya to distract her from her thoughts.
344	"Episode 344"	November 7, 2013	15.7% (1st)
Teresita finds the courage to admit to her daughters that she met with Arturo.
345	"Episode 345"	November 8, 2013	13.3% (1st)
Arturo reaches out to Kute in hopes of gaining her forgiveness.
346	"Episode 346"	November 11, 2013	16.2% (1st)
Out of her love for Maya and Teresita, Kute begins picking up the pieces as she returns home to put an end to their disagreements.
347	"Episode 347"	November 12, 2013	17.5% (1st)
As part of the tradition, the Lims and the Dela Rosas prohibit Richard and Maya from seeing each other on the day before their wedding. Richard and Maya, on the other hand, grab the chance to spend quality time with their families.
348	"Episode 348"	November 13, 2013	20.5% (1st)
Maya and Richard spend quality time with their families before the big day comes. As the wedding draws near, Maya and Richard could hardly believe the happiness that they have for each other.
349	"Episode 349"	November 14, 2013	20.5% (1st)
The big day finally comes and everyone gets busy as they begin preparing for the wedding. Amid the excitement, Fe, Esmeralda, and Teresita become emotional as they look back at Richard's and Maya's childhood.
350	"Episode 350"	November 15, 2013	27.2% (1st)
On this special day, Richard and Maya finally tie the knot.
351	"Episode 351"	November 18, 2013	20.9% (1st)
It is an emotional ceremony as Richard and Maya tie the knot in front of their families and closest friends.
352	"Episode 352"	November 19, 2013	20.9% (1st)
To her delight, Liza and Joma, her long-time crush, catch the bouquet and garter in the respective ceremonies.
353	"Episode 353"	November 20, 2013	19% (1st)
Jose Mari Chan and Janine Desiderio serenade the couple at the reception with their theme song.
354	"Episode 354"	November 21, 2013	19.9% (1st)
Maya and Richard spend their first night together as husband and wife at Maya's house. Not used to being married, Maya becomes jumpy as she shares the bed with Richard for the first time.
355	"Episode 355"	November 22, 2013	19.6% (1st)
Teresita becomes emotional as she watches Maya pack up her things and move in with Richard in their home. Before departing San Nicolas, Maya issues some last minute reminders to her family and asks them to always keep in touch.
356	"Episode 356"	November 25, 2013	18.7% (1st)
Richard and Maya arrive in Japan for their honeymoon. However, the couple misses their reservation at a restaurant as Maya spends more than an hour in the bathroom, thinking that they will only be staying in their room.
357	"Episode 357"	November 26, 2013	19.1% (1st)
Luke finally puts the puzzle together and deduces that Mallows is actually Nicolo. To his dismay, Luke learns that Nikki has a crush on his best friend and has been keeping this secret from him.
358	"Episode 358"	November 27, 2013	17.7% (1st)
After Luke discovers their mutual feelings for each other, Nikki and Nicolo worry about how to put things back to normal and regain Luke's trust.
359	"Episode 359"	November 28, 2013	18.2% (1st)
With their friendship on the rocks, Nicolo musters his courage to try and talk to Luke and smoothen things out. Despite his effort, Luke remains unyielding to Nicolo.
360	"Episode 360"	November 29, 2013	18.9% (1st)
Just when Richard thinks he has Maya all to himself, Abby and Nikki steal away their new stepmother for some quality girl time. With so much attention to his new wife, Richard jests about feeling out of place and unwanted.
361	"Episode 361"	December 2, 2013	19.1% (1st)
Maya raises speculations among the Lim household when she sets up a compulsory special dinner for them.
362	"Episode 362"	December 3, 2013	19.5% (1st)
Much to everyone's dismay, Maya's big announcement turns out to be far from what everybody expected. Nevertheless, the Lim siblings realize that they have to give Richard and Maya more time alone if they want to have a new baby in their family.
363	"Episode 363"	December 4, 2013	18% (1st)
Contrary to her initial plan, Maya decides to join her team's training for regional and international service. She later learns about Teresita's illness and resolves to go home immediately to San Nicolas.
364	"Episode 364"	December 5, 2013	18.8% (1st)
Teresita and Cho's capability to live by themselves is tested when their gas stove suddenly flares up. As Teresita and Cho fail to extinguish the flames, Arturo comes to their rescue. Soon, the neighbors are intrigued by Arturo's sudden return. Meanwhile, at a grocery shop, Maya secretly shops for feminine napkins while Ricky waits at a cashier line. When Maya finds her way back to Richard, she sees him carrying a baby.
365	"Episode 365"	December 6, 2013	15.9% (1st)
Believing that Richard wants to have a baby soon, Maya finds ludicrous ways to hasten her conception. At San Nicolas, Arturo's efforts on reaching out to his estranged wife pays off when Teresita gradually warms up to him.
366	"Episode 366"	December 9, 2013	18.4% (1st)
Maya and Richard set an intimate night for the two of them in the hopes of having a baby. Unfortunately, Abby's negligence on her schoolwork gets in their way. Meanwhile, Kute returns to San Nicolas only to find Arturo at their doorstep. Noticing the changes Arturo's short visit has brought upon Teresita, Kute expresses to Maya her dismay.
367	"Episode 367"	December 10, 2013	18.6% (1st)
Wanting to make up for lost time, Richard leaves his office early to spend an intimate evening with his wife. To his dismay, Richard comes home only to discover that Maya went to her ob-gynecologist again without informing him. To make matters worse, Luke and Nikki eat out with Nicolo without seeking their father's permission. Upset, Richard allows Abby to play with her iPad, unaware that Maya has forbidden Abby from using it.
368	"Episode 368"	December 11, 2013	18.5% (1st)
When Maya finally musters the courage to explain her sudden decision to consult her ob-gyne, Richard reminds her that he is not in a hurry for them to have a baby. Although relieved with Richard's forgiveness and understanding, Maya cannot help but to continue her research on pregnancy. Meanwhile, Amiel uses a social media site to learn from Abby some valuable information about Nikki and the latter's crush.
369	"Episode 369"	December 12, 2013	18.1% (1st)
Richard learns from Rafi that Abby has set up a Facebook account. When Richard confronts Abby about it, Abby admits her envy towards the attention Nikki gets through social media sites. To Maya's horror, Abby's confession incites a domino effect as Nikki's and Luke's secrets on courtship and studies get revealed one after the other. At San Nicolas, Arturo tries to reach out to Kute.
370	"Episode 370"	December 13, 2013	17.7% (1st)
Richard forbids Luke, Nikki, and Abby from using their gadgets, the Internet, and the television. While Maya tries to defend the children, Luke, Nikki and Abby point fingers at each other for the punishment they received.
371	"Episode 371"	December 16, 2013	16.5% (1st)
Luke, Nikki, and Abby remain indifferent toward each other after Richard gave them punishment for overusing the internet and neglecting their studies. Soon, the siblings' silent war takes a toll on Richard and Maya as they, too, argue on how to mediate between their children. At San Nicolas, Kute complains to Teresita about how her estranged father persistently tries to make amends with her, unaware that Arturo has already asked Teresita's help in reaching out to her.
372	"Episode 372"	December 17, 2013	17.8% (1st)
While a bullying incident at school leads Nikki and Abby to draw strength from each other and finally reconcile, Maya and Richard remain cold toward each other. At San Nicolas, Arturo tells Kute that he is not expecting her to welcome him back into their family, but that he only asks for their forgiveness. To Arturo's relief, Kute begins to warm up to him.
373	"Episode 373"	December 18, 2013	17.6% (1st)
Nikki and Abby join forces in reconciling with Luke. When Maya learns of the Lim siblings' reconciliation, she asks them to help her in making amends with Richard as well. That night, while Maya and the kids patiently wait for Richard to come home, Richard passes up the opportunity to leave work early. At San Nicolas, Kute admits to Simon her reasons for remaining cold toward Arturo.
374	"Episode 374"	December 19, 2013	16.2% (1st)
Maya and the Lim children serenade Richard as their peace offering. Touched by their gesture, Richard thanks them but still strictly addresses his issues with the children. Likewise, Maya admits to Richard her realization that she still has a lot to learn about motherhood. At San Nicolas, Arturo brims with excitement when Teresita invites him over for Christmas.
375	"Episode 375"	December 20, 2013	17.2% (1st)
After many years, Arturo gets to spend Christmas with his estranged family again. In his earnest desire to make a good impression on everyone especially Kute, Arturo begins knocking things around Teresita's house. Meanwhile, Richard surprises Maya with a special Christmas gift.
376	"Episode 376"	December 23, 2013	16.2% (1st)
The Christmas celebrations continue as everyone gives gifts to each other. After giving Maya her own car, Richard also surprises Luke, Nikki, and Abby with bicycles. At San Nicolas, Kute overhears Teresita advising Arturo to nurture the trust Kute is gradually rebuilding on him.
377	"Episode 377"	December 24, 2013	13.4% (1st)
Richard worries that Maya regrets spending Christmas with him instead of her family at San Nicolas, but Maya assures him that she treasures her first Christmas with her new family. The next day, Maya passes up breakfast and later feels dizzy. At San Nicolas, Kute finally explains to Arturo her reservations on him.
378	"Episode 378"	December 25, 2013	11.1% (1st)
Maya starts with her driving lessons. At San Nicolas, Kute tells Arturo about their plans to spend New Year's Eve in Manila, hoping that Arturo will see it as his cue to return to Cebu. To Kute's dismay and to Teresita's delight, Arturo offers to oversee the operations of Chibugan while they are out of town.
379	"Episode 379"	December 26, 2013	13.8% (1st)
Richard and Maya resume the latter's driving lessons in their subdivision. Unfortunately, an incident on the road makes Maya doubt her capability to learn how to drive. When they get home later in the evening, Maya gets dizzy again. At San Nicolas, Teresita and Kute teach Arturo cooking techniques and the business aspects of Chibugan. Later, Kute cannot help but let her guard down when Arturo serves her favorite Christmas snack.
380	"Episode 380"	December 27, 2013	17% (1st)
Teresita, Kute, Cho, and Esmeralda arrive at the Lims' to spend New Year's Eve with Maya's new family. Hope on Maya's pregnancy sparks anew when Maya's dizziness become too frequent that it aggravates into nausea. Despite Maya's objections, Richard decides to have Maya checked by a doctor.
381	"Episode 381"	December 30, 2013	15.7% (1st)
Seeing everyone abuzz over Maya's possible pregnancy, Richard and Maya disprove their assumptions by insisting that Maya is just suffering from pre-menstrual syndrome. Meanwhile, Kute calls Lino to check on Chibugan. Maya is pleased when Kute asks about Arturo as well.
382	"Episode 382"	December 31, 2013	12.2% (1st)
Maya, Esmeralda, Teresita, Nikki, and Abby get their hair cut in time for the New Year celebration. To everyone's delight, Richard is smitten with his wife's new look.

=== 2014 ===
Blue denotes the lowest rating, while red denotes the highest. The numbers in parentheses denote the program's ranking among daytime shows based on Total Philippines (urban and rural) household viewership.

No.	Title	Original release date	Kantar Media-TNS Nationwide Ratings
383	"Episode 383"	January 1, 2014	12.9% (1st)
Everyone hopes for 2014 to be a year of bright beginnings. While Arturo wishes to be forgiven by his estranged family, Teresita, Kute, Cho, and the rest of the Lims wish Maya and Richard to have a baby.
384	"Episode 384"	January 2, 2014	17.1% (1st)
Teresita finds herself in the hot seat when her daughters start to grill her about a possibility of getting back with Arturo. Although unsure about a likely reunion with Arturo, Teresita is certain that she wants her daughters to reconcile with their father first. Meanwhile, Esmeralda's curiosity gets piqued when Maya, despite getting herself full with their New Year's Eve menu, suddenly craves for another snack.
385	"Episode 385"	January 3, 2014	16.7% (1st)
While Teresita gives Maya tips on getting pregnant, Arturo readies the house in time for Teresita, Kute, and Cho's return. Before her immediate family leaves, Maya instructs her sister to find a lot at San Nicolas that she can buy for them. The following day, Maya resumes her driving lessons. Unfortunately, fear gets the best of Maya. At San Nicolas, Kute finds herself smiling while reading the note Arturo left for Lino, Bugoy, and Chona.
386	"Episode 386"	January 6, 2014	17.2% (1st)
After admitting to Richard that she is having a hard time with her driving lessons, Maya suggests to give her new car to Luke instead. She feels nauseous once again, prompting Richard to bring her to a doctor. At the hospital, she undergoes a check-up, and the couple soon receive the most surprising news in their marital life.
387	"Episode 387"	January 7, 2014	19.5% (1st)
After confirming Maya's pregnancy result from an ob-gyn. Maya and Richard prepare for the formal announcement to their family, But before the couple could reveal the good news, Fe and Richard's children accidentally discover the result of Maya's recent check-up when they found the doctor's note inside the trashbag.
388	"Episode 388"	January 8, 2014	17% (1st)
After Richard's children learn of Maya's pregnancy, the couple's friends and other relatives also welcome the news with joy and excitement. Meanwhile, Arturo decides to delay his flight to Cebu and proceed to extend his stay in San Nicolas. Cristina Rose slowly softens her heart for her long-lost father as she agrees to let him visit their house and eatery regularly.
389	"Episode 389"	January 9, 2014	18.1% (1st)
Because of her pregnancy, Maya slowly experiences a change in preferences of food and scents, making her family willingly do the proper adjustments. Richard and Maya soon share news of her pregnancy with their respective colleagues at work. Meanwhile, Arturo and Cristina Rose are slowly renewing ties with one another after she lets him help them work at Chibugan.
390	"Episode 390"	January 10, 2014	18.5% (1st)
Determined to find out the food Maya prefers now that she is pregnant, Richard orders a wide variety of food for her. Nikki, on the other hand, sets out a plan for her youngest sibling's room, tagging along her other siblings and their household helpers. Meanwhile, Cristina Rose shows a friendly gesture to Arturo when her father stayed up late to finish his work in Chibugan.
391	"Episode 391"	January 13, 2014	19.3% (1st)
To satisfy her cravings, Maya wakes up in the middle of the night to cook stir-fried noodles. Richard finds her in the kitchen and volunteers to cook it for her. Maya then goes on to eat heartily despite the dish's bad taste. Meanwhile, Arturo is filled with gladness after spending the night at his old home with Kute's consent.
392	"Episode 392"	January 14, 2014	19.4% (1st)
To appease Maya's cravings for his stir-fried noodles, Richard teaches Sabel how to cook the dish his way which later fails to satiate Maya's tastebuds. While Luke advises Niccolo to refrain from visiting their house, Kute reminds Teresita to take caution about her feelings for Arturo.
393	"Episode 393"	January 15, 2014	18% (1st)
Sabel gives her best effort to copy Richard's style in cooking stir-fried noodles so that Maya can avoid skipping meals. Coming home from an out-of-town trip, Richard deprives himself of ample sleep to cook for his wife in the wee hours of the morning.
394	"Episode 394"	January 16, 2014	18.6% (1st)
Through research and people's personal accounts, Maya learns more on the myth about pregnant women shifting their "paglilihi" to their husbands. Despite learning about an alarming news regarding his business in Cebu, Arturo chooses to stay indefinitely in San Nicolas with his family. Meanwhile, Nikki's attempt to lose weight takes its toll on her health.
395	"Episode 395"	January 17, 2014	18.2% (1st)
After attempting to pass her "paglilihi" to Richard, Maya slowly believes in the said old wives' tale as she notices some changes in his behavior. Meanwhile, Nikki is rushed to the hospital after complaining of stomach pains.
396	"Episode 396"	January 20, 2014	17.3% (1st)
While Niccolo attempts to find the hospital where Nikki is confined, Maya convinces Richard to let her visit her stepdaughter. Meanwhile, Teresita happily observes how Kute and Arturo are slowly patching things up.
397	"Episode 397"	January 21, 2014	17.8% (1st)
After reprimanding Niccolo for visiting Nikki at the hospital, Maya suddenly makes him a subject of her "paglilihi." She then helps the young man escape before Richard sees him. Meanwhile, Arturo thanks Kute for allowing him to be part of their family again.
398	"Episode 398"	January 22, 2014	16.1% (1st)
Richard invites Niccolo over lunch at his house to talk about the latter's feelings for his daughter, Nikki. On a separate occasion, Richard consults an ob-gyn regarding Maya's "paglilihi." Meanwhile, Arturo prepares to go back to Cebu to fix few problems, including the recent burglary in his house.
399	"Episode 399"	January 23, 2014	18.3% (1st)
Richard and Abby catch a glimpse of Maya's baby as they accompany her to the ob-gyn for a regular check-up. Maya, on the other hand, believes that she has successfully passed her "paglilihi" to Richard. While Esmeralda arrives at the Lim's house for a short visit, Kute learns that Arturo has returned to Cebu.
400	"Episode 400"	January 24, 2014	17.7% (1st)
As Cho's science wizard competition draws near, Kute and Teresita begin to worry if Arturo can make it back from Cebu in time to watch the contest. Meanwhile, Maya is starting to take strong measures after becoming convinced that Richard has indeed contracted her "paglilihi."
401	"Episode 401"	January 27, 2014	19.2% (1st)
Despite all odds, Arturo arrives in the nick of time to watch Cho during the San Nicolas science wizard competition. Soon, Cho and his team make it to the final round. Meanwhile, Niccolo delays going to class to pass by Nikki's school and see her for the last time.
402	"Episode 402"	January 28, 2014	18.1% (1st)
Following a close fight against the students from a rival school, Cho and his team emerge as the winners of the science wizard competition. Arturo soon tries to reach out and apologize to Kute regarding his sudden departure to Cebu. Meanwhile, Richard continues to make Maya believe that he is going through "paglilihi."
403	"Episode 403"	January 29, 2014	18.6% (1st)
Nikki and the rest of the family continue redecorating Abby's room in time to surprise Richard and Maya. Paying a visit at Richard's office, Maya finds out that Richard is only faking his "paglilihi," resulting to their disagreement. Meanwhile, Arturo continues his attempt to win back Kute's trust.
404	"Episode 404"	January 30, 2014	19.4% (1st)
Still upset with Richard's put-on act of contracting "paglilihi," Maya continues to give him the cold shoulder. They soon discover the nursery inside Abby's room which was supposed to be the family's surprise for them. Meanwhile, Arturo suffers a minor injury during an intense basketball game with Kute and Cho.
405	"Episode 405"	January 31, 2014	16.9% (1st)
With Kute's consent, Arturo spends the night at her house while trying to recover from his injured leg. Meanwhile, Maya and Richard offer his kids the chance to give the future baby a name, showing how grateful they are for the remodeling of Abby's room into a nursery.
406	"Episode 406"	February 3, 2014	19.9% (1st)
Despite Arturo's attempts to keep it a secret, Teresita and Kute learn about his leg's worsening condition from his friend. To keep Maya from involving herself, Richard orders Lisa to help Nikki in her birthday preparations. Meanwhile, Abby wins in Richard and Maya's raffle of giving the name to the future baby.
407	"Episode 407"	February 4, 2014	18.6% (1st)
Richard forbids Maya to participate in organizing Nikki's birthday party to avoid aggravating her recent morning sickness and abdominal pains. Maya, however, finds a way to get what she wants, only to regret it in the end. Meanwhile, Kute becomes increasingly concerned about Arturo's condition which is eventually noticed by Teresita.
408	"Episode 408"	February 5, 2014	19.1% (1st)
Maya fails to control herself from shopping supplies for the baby despite agreeing to Richard to do it together next month. Nikki, on the other hand, decides to ask her friends for gifts for the baby as her birthday gift. Meanwhile, Kute becomes increasingly annoyed to take Arturo's idea for a gift for the baby, having to endure her mother's delight for lending him her old crutch earlier.
409	"Episode 409"	February 6, 2014	17.6% (1st)
Sleep gets the better of Kute and Cho while they try to repair the babywalker, until Arturo continues and finishes the work for them in time. Meanwhile, the Lims don their best costumes for Nikki's birthday party, where Niccolo and Amiel catch everyone's attention for choosing the same character to wear.
410	"Episode 410"	February 7, 2014	19.7% (1st)
As Nikki's birthday party ends on a happy note, Richard realizes that his family is getting bigger and announces his desire to buy a new house to accommodate everyone. However, everyone's excitement is cut short the next morning when Maya is rushed to the hospital because of an alarming experience.
411	"Episode 411"	February 10, 2014	19.9% (1st)
While Maya remains confined at the hospital, her family starts to worry about her condition, prompting Teresita to leave for Manila to visit her daughter. At the hospital, Dra. Galero discovers something with Maya's ultrasound.
412	"Episode 412"	February 11, 2014	18.8% (1st)
Richard and Maya announce that they are having twins, much to everyone's happiness and excitement. While everyone celebrates at the good news, Kute notices that Arturo suddenly becomes melancholic.
413	"Episode 413"	February 12, 2014	18.8% (1st)
Maya soon gets discharged from the hospital. Teresita decides to stay in the mansion to take care of her, leaving Kute struggling to figure out the reason behind Arturo's low spirit. Meanwhile, Richard takes Maya out on a date and surprises her with a huge patch of land for their future home.
414	"Episode 414"	February 13, 2014	18% (1st)
Kute finally gets to invite Arturo over a drink and indirectly learns the reason behind his recent melancholia. Meanwhile, Maya discovers the huge amount that their family spends and asks Richard's permission to handle the budget herself.
415	"Episode 415"	February 14, 2014	18.7% (1st)
Richard goes home late to learn that Maya has done so much for the day: planning a more economical household budget, coaching Abby on her declamation piece, and helping Nikki practice volleyball. Meanwhile, Kute holds herself back from asking more about Arturo's life while he was away.
416	"Episode 416"	February 17, 2014	19.8% (1st)
After settling his issues back in Cebu, Arturo goes back to San Nicolas and hands over precious and meaningful gifts to Kute. He then asks her to open her heart for him once again. Restless while spending her rest day at home, Maya busies herself with household chores and helps the kids with their activities in school.
417	"Episode 417"	February 18, 2014	18.6% (1st)
Apart from making the children eat vegetables, Maya's activities become too worrisome for Teresita, prompting her to ask Richard's permission for Maya to visit San Nicolas. While Richard ponders on the request, Maya becomes excited about the idea when Kute invites her over to San Nicolas.
418	"Episode 418"	February 19, 2014	18.5% (1st)
News of Maya's visit to San Nicolas already spreads among both sides of the family, faster than Maya's plans to ask Richard's permission. Already aware of this, Richard then surprises Maya with a dinner date that ends with a special gift.
419	"Episode 419"	February 20, 2014	20.3% (1st)
Maya's sure visit to San Nicolas makes everyone happy and excited. However, Teresita's and Arturo's anticipation for the reunion becomes apparent which fascinates Maya and Kute.
420	"Episode 420"	February 21, 2014	21.1% (1st)
Maya arrives in San Nicolas and is welcomed by her excited neighbors and Arturo, who tops off the welcome party with a superstitious practice upon arriving home. While Maya is pleased to witness the reconciliation of her parents, Kute becomes annoyed at Arturo's apparent advances to Teresita.
421	"Episode 421"	February 24, 2014	19.2% (1st)
While spending vacation at San Nicolas, Richard observes that Arturo is still uncomfortable with him and asks his father-in-law to accompany him to the market as a friendly gesture. Meanwhile, Nikki turns down again Amiel's invitation to go on a date.
422	"Episode 422"	February 25, 2014	20.7% (1st)
While Richard slowly overcomes Arturo's discomfort towards him, Maya enjoys the company of her mother and sister during their visit to Conchita. Meanwhile, Abby becomes friends with the boy she fought with at the park, while Nikki's friends set her up on a date with Amiel.
423	"Episode 423"	February 26, 2014	18.2% (1st)
Amiel's surprise date fails to impress Nikki, but despite this, Amiel makes a move on her by holding her hand. Incidentally, Luke and Niccolo witness the act from afar. Meanwhile, Richard learns that he has to leave San Nicolas for an urgent matter at work.
424	"Episode 424"	February 27, 2014	17.4% (1st)
Lino and Bugoy's suspicion that the old woman might be a creature of the night becomes known to the family, prompting Arturo to visit the old woman's house and clarify the rumor once and for all. Meanwhile, Nikki's heartbreak-induced depression heightens when Abby receives a surprising and unexpected present.
425	"Episode 425"	February 28, 2014	17.8% (1st)
Arturo and Lino finally clarify the rumor about the old woman when they personally visit her and learn about her sad story. Meanwhile, Richard learns about his daughters' situation and braces himself for a talk with the girls.
426	"Episode 426"	March 3, 2014	18.3% (1st)
While Richard misses Maya in the city, Maya gets the chance to relive her childhood memories with her family as they return to their old picnic spot.
427	"Episode 427"	March 4, 2014	17.5% (1st)
Maya receives a wonderful surprise from Richard as the latter fulfills his promise to be by her side when she wakes up. She soon opens up to Kute about their project to build a bigger branch of Chibugan and tells her sister that it is the right time for them to turn this dream into reality. Meanwhile, Abby gets the idea that her classmate Michael might be her secret admirer.
428	"Episode 428"	March 5, 2014	18.8% (1st)
Starting off with their plan to build a bigger branch of Chibugan, Maya and Kute begin to look for the perfect site where they will put up their business. As they try their best to hide their plan from their family, the sisters are unaware that Richard and Arturo have been making the same move for their own business plans as well.
429	"Episode 429"	March 6, 2014	17.3% (1st)
Determined to pursue their project, Maya and Kute finally settle to buy the lot from Ramon. However, the siblings are soon disheartened after learning that someone has already bought the property that they want, not knowing that Richard and Arturo are the ones behind this incident. Meanwhile, Abby continues to be bothered by her secret admirer, while Nicolo gets the chance to visit Nikki at her house with Luke and Aira's help.
430	"Episode 430"	March 7, 2014	18.5% (1st)
After learning of Maya and Kute's failed attempt to buy a lot, Richard and Arturo are guilt-stricken as they find out that the land they have bought was the same property that the ladies wanted to acquire. Soon, the four compromise as they come to an agreement to use the land as a site in building all their business plans. Meanwhile, Luke takes it upon himself to seek his father's and his grandparents' permission to allow Nicolo to visit Nikki at their house.
431	"Episode 431"	March 10, 2014	18.7% (1st)
The time has come for Abby to discover the identity of her secret admirer when the latter pays her a surprise visit at home. Nikki also receives her own surprise as Nicolo shows up to apologize to her.
432	"Episode 432"	March 11, 2014	19.3% (1st)
Taking Nikki's advice, Abby finally musters the courage to face her suitor and tell him that she is not ready for courtship yet. Nikki also relents to Nicolo and finally agrees to talk to him and hear his explanation as to why he was with Georgina.
433	"Episode 433"	March 12, 2014	18.5% (1st)
Love and cooperation enfold the dela Rosa household as they prepare for and celebrate the town feast. Richard willingly helps in cooking the dishes and even joins Arturo's team to defend Maya and Kute's championship in the annual parlor games.
434	"Episode 434"	March 13, 2014	18.8% (1st)
Though hesitant, Richard joins Simon and Arturo in defending the dela Rosas' championship title in the Pistang Palaro. Meanwhile, the play ends well for Nikki as it earns warm applause from the audience.
435	"Episode 435"	March 14, 2014	18.5% (1st)
While the Lims triumph in the success of Nikki's play, the Dela Rosas, along with Maya and Richard, likewise celebrate their championship in the Pistang Palaro. Soon, the Lims welcome Maya and Richard back in the mansion.
436	"Episode 436"	March 17, 2014	19.2% (1st)
Richard finally gets the opportunity to scrutinize Abby's suitor Lance and learns about the boy's real intentions toward his daughter. Meanwhile, Kute and Arturo mobilize their business plans by submitting their desired blueprint to the contractor.
437	"Episode 437"	March 18, 2014	18.9% (1st)
While Nikki and Cho rejoice after learning that they have topped their respective classes, Abby undergoes a hard time accepting the fact that she did not make it to make it to her class' top 10.
438	"Episode 438"	March 19, 2014	17.5% (1st)
In hopes of returning the favor to Teresita for giving him the chance to be part of his children's life again, Arturo seeks Kute's permission to take her mother out on a date.
439	"Episode 439"	March 20, 2014	17.8% (1st)
During Maya's first ultrasound session with her new gynecologist, the Lim couple expresses different opinions on whether or not the doctor should reveal the genders of the twins.
440	"Episode 440"	March 21, 2014	20.9% (1st)
Arturo and Teresita get to spend some time alone in their much-awaited date.
441	"Episode 441"	March 24, 2014	20.4% (1st)
Richard wins a bet against his wife when Maya accidentally finds out the gender of their babies. The Lim couple arrives at a comedy bar where Maya will sing in front of the other customers as a consequence for losing the bet.
442	"Episode 442"	March 25, 2014	20.2% (1st)
The Lim siblings come up with their own strategies to raise funds for the surprise parties they are planning to throw for Richard and the twins. The dela Rosas also get busy preparing for the grand opening of their new restobar in San Nicolas.
443	"Episode 443"	March 26, 2014	20.8% (1st)
Via Skype, the Lim family joins the dela Rosas as they formally launch Little Pards and Kambal’s Chibugan and Karaoke in San Nicolas.
444	"Episode 444"	March 27, 2014	19.6% (1st)
While Maya deems that her surprise birthday party for Richard is going as smoothly as planned, Richard and his children are busy doing last-minute preparations for their surprise event.
445	"Episode 445"	March 28, 2014	19.1% (1st)
Maya receives another surprise during her baby shower when Kute suddenly shows up to give her a present that reminds them of their humble beginnings.
446	"Episode 446"	March 31, 2014	19% (1st)
After poking fun at Maya for wearing Kute's maternity dress, Richard offers to bring the Dela Rosa sisters to the mall despite his busy schedule at work.
447	"Episode 447"	April 1, 2014	18.8% (1st)
After refusing to take her maternity leave despite her condition, Maya learns that Richard has forgotten about taking her and Kute to the mall. Meanwhile, Teresita learns that Arturo has received gifts from his supposed admirers.
448	"Episode 448"	April 2, 2014	18.8% (1st)
Maya and Kute enjoy a good stroll at the mall despite the former's difficulty in moving around. Kute worries for Maya's welfare and asks Richard to convince her to take the maternity leave.
449	"Episode 449"	April 3, 2014	17% (1st)
Arturo tries to appease Teresita's anxieties about his admirers, finally admitting his intentions to win her back if not for Kute's disapproval.
450	"Episode 450"	April 4, 2014	18.9% (1st)
Feeling sad about Richard's lack of time for her because of his hectic schedule, Maya decides to go to work as well despite his earlier pleas to take her maternity leave.
451	"Episode 451"	April 7, 2014	17.5% (1st)
Trying to ease Richard's fatigue at Lim Aviation, Maya pays her husband a surprise visit at his office and reveals that she already filed a maternity leave at work.
452	"Episode 452"	April 8, 2014	17.3% (1st)
Arturo becomes thoroughly upset as Teresita incessantly asks him to have their marriage annulled. Meanwhile, Richard and Maya bring the family to the site of their new house.
453	"Episode 453"	April 9, 2014	18.4% (1st)
Arturo soon becomes unable to handle his problem with Teresita and gives in to alcohol. The incident calls Kute and Maya's attention, compelling them to talk some sense into their parents. Richard plans to have an out-of-town trip for their families.
454	"Episode 454"	April 10, 2014	18.4% (1st)
Maya comes up with an idea to turn the out-of-town trip into a venue for her parents' reconciliation and begins to execute her plans by first convincing both hesitant parties to come along.
455	"Episode 455"	April 11, 2014	17.7% (1st)
Expecting that Georgina will do her part of their bargain, Niccolo finally convinces Aira to attend the sorority's acquaintance party. However, Niccolo's and Aira's attendance greatly affects Nikki and Luke respectively.
456	"Episode 456"	April 14, 2014	19.6% (1st)
As the whole family arrive at Cebu for their vacation, Teresita is surprised to see Arturo. She soon learns that Kute and Maya are behind the set-up and awkwardly proceeds to talk with Arturo briefly about their issues.
457	"Episode 457"	April 15, 2014	18.4% (1st)
Despite the slow progress of her plans, Maya continues to find opportunities for her parents to talk and settle their problem. Finally, Arturo and Teresita get their chance to talk at the "most romantic place" in San Nicolas.
458	"Episode 458"	April 16, 2014	17.6% (1st)
While looking for Maya and Richard in the mango farm, Arturo and Teresita bump into Fernando, a mango farm owner whose eyes are locked on Teresita.
459	"Episode 459"	April 21, 2014	17.4% (1st)
With help from Maya, Richard, Cho, and Abby, Arturo finally gets the chance he needs to win back Teresita and to change her mind regarding their annulment.
460	"Episode 460"	April 22, 2014	18% (1st)
Luke and Nikki learn that Niccolo and Aira opted out of the sorority party to have fun on their own instead.
461	"Episode 461"	April 23, 2014	18.2% (1st)
With Maya's approaching due date, Richard and Maya finalize the preparations for her delivery. Much to her delight, Maya learns that she can have a normal delivery and, together with Richard, meets her new pediatrician Dr. Tim Gonzaga.
462	"Episode 462"	April 24, 2014	16.5% (1st)
To ensure Maya's safe delivery, the family holds a dry run of their roles at the onset of her contractions. While everyone does their respective functions smoothly, Maya herself becomes the major delay of their exercise.
463	"Episode 463"	April 25, 2014	16.3% (1st)
While Lino and Bugoy’s failed operations at the Chibugan delays Arturo’s trip to Manila in time for Maya’s nearing delivery, Simon accepts Teresita’s request to temporarily replace the man in managing the business.
464	"Episode 464"	April 28, 2014	16.3% (1st)
Feeling guilty for choosing to go out with their friends than to look out for Maya, Nikki and Luke opt to bring their friends over to their house, where they play charades with the rest of the Lims.
465	"Episode 465"	April 29, 2014	20% (1st)
The time has come for Maya’s water bag to break, but while the Lim household works hand in hand to ensure Maya’s safe arrival in the hospital, Richard falls asleep in his office and learns of his wife’s condition soon after.
466	"Episode 466"	April 30, 2014	19% (1st)
As Maya’s water bag broke earlier than expected, Dra. Buenaflor tells Richard that his wife should undergo cesarean section procedure to ensure the safety of the twins.
467	"Episode 467"	May 1, 2014	19.4% (1st)
The wait is officially over for the Lims and the Dela Rosas as Maya finally gives birth to a healthy baby boy and a beautiful baby girl.
468	"Episode 468"	May 2, 2014	19.3% (1st)
News of the twins’ birth quickly reaches Kute, Cho, and the rest of the family. While Maya insists that the babies look more of a Dela Rosa than a Lim, Richard believes otherwise.
469	"Episode 469"	May 5, 2014	17.7% (1st)
With help from her mother and husband, Maya slowly begins to learn breastfeeding. Meanwhile, Abby decides to give her parents back the privilege of naming the twins.
470	"Episode 470"	May 6, 2014	17.2% (1st)
Richard and Maya finally decide on what to name the newest additions to their family.
471	"Episode 471"	May 7, 2014	16.2% (1st)
Dr. Buenaflor informs Maya that she and the twins are ready for discharge. Meanwhile, Kute’s plan to surprise her sister goes awry because of Cho’s handful of schoolwork and Arturo’s extended stay in Manila.
472	"Episode 472"	May 8, 2014	17% (1st)
Maya and the twins finally arrive home from the hospital. While everyone is brimming with excitement, Roberto continues to brood over the fact that Richard and Maya did not name the babies after him, Esmeralda, Arturo, and Teresita.
473	"Episode 473"	May 9, 2014	16.2% (1st)
Contrary to Nikki, who is brave enough to admit her mistake and ask him for forgiveness, Nicolo chickens out in telling her about Georgina’s kiss. Meanwhile, Maya and Richard hatch a plan to surprise Teresita, Esmeralda, and Fe.
474	"Episode 474"	May 12, 2014	15.3% (1st)
Richard and Maya arrange a date for Teresita and Arturo, Esmeralda and Roberto, and Fe and Joma, wanting to thank the women for all the help they have given Maya.
475	"Episode 475"	May 13, 2014	16.4% (1st)
While he and Teresita are out on a date with Roberto and Esmeralda, and Fe and Joma, Arturo finally musters up the courage to ask his wife for another chance at love.
476	"Episode 476"	May 14, 2014	16.9% (1st)
Just as Nicolo is about to tell Luke and Nikki the truth about Georgina’s kiss, Georgina shows up and reveals the whole thing, getting him into a greater deal of trouble.
477	"Episode 477"	May 15, 2014	13.6% (1st)
With help from Richard, Fe, and the rest of the family, Maya begins to get the hang of taking care of Sky and Sunshine. Meanwhile, Fernando and Nicolo exert all their efforts to earn Teresita’s affection and Nikki’s forgiveness.
478	"Episode 478"	May 16, 2014	16.7% (1st)
Though she is a success at taking care of the babies, Maya becomes less triumphant in managing her own emotions. Meanwhile, Amiel clears Nicolo’s name to Nikki by telling her everything he knows about Georgina's kiss.
479	"Episode 479"	May 19, 2014	14.5% (1st)
Maya consults Dr. Buenaflor about her raging emotions and learns that she is experiencing a case of the baby blues. Though she manages to get past it, another worry awaits her and Richard as they find blood in Sunshine’s diaper.
480	"Episode 480"	May 20, 2014	15.5% (1st)
Maya goes with Richard to the party Lim Aviation is throwing for its newest members. She meets the beautiful Celeste Madrigal and the rest of Richard’s newest associates.
481	"Episode 481"	May 21, 2014	15.1% (1st)
Arturo musters up the courage to tell Fernando that he is still in love with Teresita and to ask for Kute’s permission to woo the woman. Meanwhile, Nicolo, Luke, and Amiel finally reconcile.
482	"Episode 482"	May 22, 2014	15.7% (1st)
Abby assumes her family is planning to surprise her on her birthday after overhearing Richard and Maya’s conversation about a party.
483	"Episode 483"	May 23, 2014	16.2% (1st)
Arturo finally finds out how Teresita feels about him after he declares his undying love for her. Meanwhile, Richard finds the perfect gifts for Sky, Sunshine, and Maya.
484	"Episode 484"	May 26, 2014	16.4% (1st)
Teresita and Arturo check the inventory in Little Pard’s Chibugan and find some of their supplies gone. While the two doubt the possibility of theft, Kute suspects otherwise.
485	"Episode 485"	May 27, 2014	15.8% (1st)
The Lims’ closest friends and colleagues join the family in celebrating Sky and Sunshine’s first month. However, while everyone is having a great time, Abby continues to feel sad, thinking her parents and siblings completely forgot her birthday.
486	"Episode 486"	May 28, 2014	17.8% (1st)
Kute finally finds out that Lino is the one who has been stealing food from Little Pard’s Chibugan and that he has been crashing in the stock room for quite some time.
487	"Episode 487"	May 29, 2014	15.9% (1st)
Abby is in for a huge surprise as Richard, Maya, Luke, Nikki, and the rest of their family prepare a fun treasure hunt and a unique party for her birthday.
488	"Episode 488"	May 30, 2014	14.1% (1st)
After speaking with Richard and Maya, Abby finally realizes that she should not be jealous of Sky and Sunshine for their parents love them all just the same. She also begins to see herself as the two’s older sister, not their competitor.
489	"Episode 489"	June 2, 2014	15.2% (1st)
Maya is hurled into panic after failing to stop the twins from crying. Together with Fe, Maya takes the twins to the doctor to see if there is something wrong.
490	"Episode 490"	June 3, 2014	15.5% (1st)
Thinking that she is losing time for her other kids, Maya makes an effort to keep track of the Lim siblings' recent affairs by personally talking to Luke and Nikki.
491	"Episode 491"	June 4, 2014	15.1% (1st)
As the Lim couple finally decides to have the twins' baptism as soon as possible, Maya deems it the right time to find a nanny for her twins. Together with Abby, Maya meticulously screens the nanny applicants that arrived at the mansion.
492	"Episode 492"	June 5, 2014	15.1% (1st)
The Lim couple finds the perfect nanny for Sky and Sunshine in Lea. As she starts with her new job, Lea unintentionally exposes Sabel and Doris' secret to Richard and Maya. Meanwhile, Luke finally decides to confess his true feeling for Aira.
493	"Episode 493"	June 6, 2014	16% (1st)
Luke musters all his courage to tell Aira how he truly feels for her. However, Aira turns him down and explains that she only sees him as a friend.
494	"Episode 494"	June 9, 2014	17.1% (1st)
The dela Rosas warmly welcome Maya, Richard, and the twins back to San Nicolas. However, the happy reunion takes an unexpected turn when Cho unwittingly reveals the incident that took place during the videoke contest.
495	"Episode 495"	June 10, 2014	14.7% (1st)
Richard unintentionally offends Arturo when he proposes to close down the videoke house. Guilt-stricken, Richard expresses his worries about Arturo to Maya and Teresita.
496	"Episode 496"	June 11, 2014	16.4% (1st)
Arturo finally settles his conflict with Richard after realizing that closing the videoke house is the right thing to do.
497	"Episode 497"	June 12, 2014	15.9% (1st)
Teresita comes upon Arturo's plan to put up his mango farm as collateral to provide capital for their new business. When Teresita offers her help, Arturo is forced to turn down her offer out of pride and shame.
498	"Episode 498"	June 13, 2014	16% (1st)
The Lim siblings realize that they have been spending more time with their stepmother rather than their own father. In hopes of making it up to Richard, Luke, Nikki, and Abby spend the rest of the day with their father and the twins.
499	"Episode 499"	June 16, 2014	15.5% (1st)
The long wait is over for the Lims and the dela Rosas as Maya, Richard, and their loved ones gather at the church to witness the baptism of Sky and Sunshine.
500	"Episode 500"	June 17, 2014	14.3% (1st)
The dela Rosas, the Lims, and the other guests celebrate Sky and Sunshine's baptism by sharing a bountiful meal during the reception. Maya and Richard also express their gratitude to everyone who witnessed their twins' newest milestone.
501	"Episode 501"	June 18, 2014	13.8% (1st)
Luke invites his friends over to the Lim mansion before their semestral break ends. Nikki fails to conceal her sadness upon seeing that Nicolo did not come with her brother's friends.
502	"Episode 502"	June 19, 2014	15.4% (1st)
As she finally settles her conflict with Doris, Sabel shares to her best friend the development of her blossoming romance with Gerry. Meanwhile, Nicolo continues to avoid Nikki in spite of his desire to see the young lady.
503	"Episode 503"	June 20, 2014	14.6% (1st)
After realizing his wrong decision of ending his friendship with Nikki, Nicolo seeks Luke's help to fix the damage he has done. While Richard receives an alarming news about his new house, Maya starts to prepare herself to go back to work.
504	"Episode 504"	June 23, 2014	15.5% (1st)
Maya decides to let go of her job to become a full-time mother to her children.
505	"Episode 505"	June 24, 2014	14.9% (1st)
Upon hearing Luke, Nikki, and Abby’s suggestions for the celebration of Richard and Maya’s upcoming first wedding anniversary, Richard decides that the family will spend the special day on a cruise.
506	"Episode 506"	June 25, 2014	14.7% (1st)
Richard and Maya share an intimate moment as they celebrate their first wedding anniversary over a romantic dinner. With their new house and the twins growing up wonderfully, Maya and Richard continue to be blessed with a great life.
507	"Episode 507"	June 26, 2014	16.2% (1st)
The Lim household gets busy as Nikki and Abby prepare for their first day of school, while Luke readies himself for his on-the-job training interview.
508	"Episode 508"	June 27, 2014	16.6% (1st)
Richard receives a good news as he learns that Lim Aviation got four nominations from the Philippine Aviation Society Awards. As Nikki gets unsolicited attention due to her outfit, Luke impresses the panel during his interview.
509	"Episode 509"	June 30, 2014	14.1% (1st)
Seeing her friend's career flourish, Maya feels a longing for her old job as a flight attendant. Meanwhile, Nikki struggles to get settled in school after the embarrassing incident at the orientation.
510	"Episode 510"	July 1, 2014	15.4% (1st)
As Richard's aspirations for Lim Aviation come to fruition, he encourages Maya to go and pursue her dream job once again.
511	"Episode 511"	July 2, 2014	15% (1st)
As Maya prepares for her job interview, Richard stays home to help watch over the twins. Meanwhile, Abby becomes insecure about her height as her classmates continue to tease her.
512	"Episode 512"	July 3, 2014	15.3% (1st)
Maya finally gets her dream job back, but a series of problems at home makes her regret her decision to work once again.
513	"Episode 513"	July 4, 2014	15.9% (1st)
Luke could hardly get over about his annoying co-intern as he incessantly tells his friends about her and later on commends Amiel for having the courage to live independently.
514	"Episode 514"	July 7, 2014	16.1% (1st)
Luke asks for his parents' permission to find his own place and move out of the house for a taste of independence. While Richard readily agrees to it, Maya feels anxious about the idea.
515	"Episode 515"	July 8, 2014	15.5% (1st)
As Maya's first day back at work approaches, she and Richard look back at the changes and adjustments that their family are gradually going through, with the children growing up and making decisions for themselves.
516	"Episode 516"	July 9, 2014	13.7% (1st)
Richard takes over the household with Fe's close supervision as Maya heads to Time Airways for her first day back as a flight attendant. There she works with Des, who starts to subtly show Maya her competitive nature.
517	"Episode 517"	July 10, 2014	14.5% (1st)
Sulking over the T-PUS officers' rejection of her application, Nikki is determined to prove herself deserving of a slot at the organization. Meanwhile, Teresita suddenly behaves irritably toward Arturo and Kute for unclear reasons.
518	"Episode 518"	July 11, 2014	15% (1st)
Consumed by her extreme yearning for the twins, Maya begins to doubt her decision of returning to work. But with Richard's encouragement, Maya manages to overcome the longing and later on earns the drive to report on her second day at work.
519	"Episode 519"	July 14, 2014	14.7% (1st)
Maya's busy schedule keeps her from spending some quality time with the twins, making her regret going back to work. In school, Nikki demands to talk to the T-PUS president and convince him to reconsider his rejection of her application.
520	"Episode 520"	July 15, 2014	11.5% (1st)
After discovering Luke's relation to the CEO of Lim Aviation Services, Joni worries about losing her dream job to Luke. Meanwhile, Maya tries to balance her work and spending time with the twins.
521	"Episode 521"	July 16, 2014	8.5% (1st)
In her haste to get home before the twins' bedtime, Maya decides to leave with the company service, forgetting that Richard is outside the airport waiting to pick her up.
522	"Episode 522"	July 17, 2014	10.2% (1st)
In her determination to balance motherhood and professional career, Maya inadvertently takes Richard for granted, and realizes her mistake a little late. Meanwhile, Kute begins to worry over Teresita who continues to show suspicious symptoms.
523	"Episode 523"	July 18, 2014	9.8% (1st)
After their little misunderstanding, Maya tries to make up for her lost time with Richard. Richard, on the other hand, accidentally loses his wedding ring after giving the twins a bath.
524	"Episode 524"	July 21, 2014	12.4% (1st)
Despite the incident during her immersion, Nikki wants to return to the tenement to finish her project. However, Richard forbids her and scolds her for being irresponsible.
525	"Episode 525"	July 22, 2014	13.2% (1st)
Richard loses hope in finding his wedding ring and decides to have a new one made without Maya's knowledge. However, Maya later discovers the new ring and shows Richard the original one.
526	"Episode 526"	July 23, 2014	12.9% (1st)
Maya tries to make it up to Richard after their misunderstanding, but Richard decides to feign indifference. Meanwhile, Nikki finally meets the T-PUS president, Michael, who gives her another chance to finish her immersion.
527	"Episode 527"	July 24, 2014	12.8% (1st)
Maya and Richard finally reconcile and things go back to normal in the Lim household.
528	"Episode 528"	July 25, 2014	15.6% (1st)
Teresita and Arturo plan a makeover for the Dampa as the producers of a popular travel show want to feature their restaurant in one of their episodes.
529	"Episode 529"	July 28, 2014	13.9% (1st)
Richard forbids Sky and Sunshine to play as they recover from their colds, causing the twins to sulk and ignore both Richard and Maya. Nikki also notices her father's stern mood when she comes home from school.
530	"Episode 530"	July 29, 2014	15.1% (1st)
Kute meets a new classmate named Lindsay, who missed the enrollment deadline after breaking up with her boyfriend. At LAS, Joni learns more about Luke's family as Richard brings Sky and Sunshine to work.
531	"Episode 531"	July 30, 2014	12.8% (1st)
Nikki goes to the café to meet with Tisay for her interview, accompanied by Luke and Nicolo. However, Luke's friends invite him to play basketball while Georgina whisks Nicolo away to a movie date.
532	"Episode 532"	July 31, 2014	13.8% (1st)
Richard's stubborn way of dealing with Nikki's mistake leads to an unpleasant argument between him and Maya. While Richard's mood at work worsens, Maya goes about her job at the airport with a smile.
533	"Episode 533"	August 1, 2014	13.8% (1st)
Richard and Maya remain aloof toward each other after their misunderstanding, neither one making the first move to reconcile. Esmeralda and Roberto soon learn of the tense situation at their son's house, but they agree not to meddle with the issue.
534	"Episode 534"	August 4, 2014	13.1% (1st)
After speaking with their loved ones, Richard and Maya plan to discuss their problems together.
535	"Episode 535"	August 5, 2014	14.6% (1st)
Richard and Maya’s conflict aggravates as the latter phones Teresita instead of Richard while watching the television feature about San Nicolas Dampa.
536	"Episode 536"	August 6, 2014	15.8% (1st)
Aside from worrying about Richard and Maya’s worsening conflict, the Dela Rosas and Lims are troubled about Maya’s safety after hearing the news about the flights that are affected by the bad weather in Visayas.
537	"Episode 537"	August 7, 2014	14.3% (1st)
Maya learns from Kute that Richard is not in their house, but is later surprised upon seeing her husband arrive at the hotel where she is staying.
538	"Episode 538"	August 8, 2014	14.9% (1st)
Richard allows Nikki to join Teatro PUS after hearing her explanation, making his daughter very happy. Maya then lends Richard’s tablet to their helpers after learning that Anastacio accepted Fe’s contact request in Facebook.
539	"Episode 539"	August 11, 2014	14.6% (1st)
Maya learns from her superior that she is one of the candidates for promotion and tells it to her husband. Maya ponders on accepting the promotion, but later overhears Des questioning the administration's decision to offer Maya a promotion.
540	"Episode 540"	August 12, 2014	14% (1st)
Maya contemplates on accepting the promotion, especially after learning that Des is spreading rumors about her. While trying to defend Luke from their gossiping colleagues, Joni accidentally reveals that Luke’s father is the owner of Lim Aviation.
541	"Episode 541"	August 13, 2014	15.7% (1st)
Joni apologizes to Luke for accidentally revealing his secret to their co-trainees and tells him that she was only trying to defend him from their colleagues’ malicious gossiping.
542	"Episode 542"	August 14, 2014	14.7% (1st)
Richard asks Maya if she would like to go on a vacation before she gets too busy in her work, but learns that Maya’s first regional flight is already scheduled tomorrow.
543	"Episode 543"	August 15, 2014	14.2% (1st)
Nikki attends Teatrong PUS’ meeting after Michael persuades her to return to their group so they could work together on the acting workshop for the children in the tenement.
544	"Episode 544"	August 18, 2014	15.1% (1st)
Luke drives Joni home despite his father’s order, but later faces a problem as waist-high flood blocks their way. With nowhere else to go, Luke brings Joni to his place and discovers that the latter has fever.
545	"Episode 545"	August 19, 2014	16.1% (1st)
Richard and Maya go to Luke’s condominium unit to check on their son, but later catch Joni sleeping on Luke’s bed. Luke and Joni explain the situation to the couple, but while Maya keeps an open mind, Richard remains angry for his son’s disobedience.
546	"Episode 546"	August 20, 2014	15.3% (1st)
Richard overhears as two trainees gossip about Luke and Joni, accusing Joni of brown-nosing to secure her place in Lim Aviation. Richard tells his wife about the rumor, but Maya discourages him from believing the gossiping interns.
547	"Episode 547"	August 21, 2014	16.2% (1st)
Richard refuses to let Abby join Teatrong PUS’ workshop in the tenement, but later suggests that they hold the event in their house so Abby could participate. While everyone is excited with Joni’s arrival in their house, Richard keeps an eye on her.
548	"Episode 548"	August 22, 2014	15.6% (1st)
After the successful workshop at their residence, Nikki and Luke attend the soft opening of their friend’s café where the latter reveals to their friends that he likes Joni.
549	"Episode 549"	August 25, 2014	17% (1st)
Cris and Lindsay bump into each other outside the church and talk about the latter’s realizations about her failed relationship with Dondon. One of their friends sees them together and spreads rumors to their classmates.
550	"Episode 550"	August 26, 2014	15.8% (1st)
Richard faces some problems in Lim Aviation as one of his trusted employees, Liza, resigns from office and as he learns about their workers’ disapproval of Celeste’s overtime restrictions memorandum.
551	"Episode 551"	August 27, 2014	15.8% (1st)
Troubled by what he learned from Luke, Richard speaks with one of his subordinates and learns that most of the employees in Lim Aviation are displeased with how Celeste runs the company.
552	"Episode 552"	August 28, 2014	14.9% (1st)
Richard learns from Celeste that Luke and Joni are inseparable during their onsite visit in the Clark hangar, but refuses to entertain the idea that his son is courting Joni.
553	"Episode 553"	August 29, 2014	14.8% (1st)
Editha asks Arturo and Teresita for help in finding a property in San Nicolas, but continues to scrutinize the couple’s lifestyle. Meanwhile, Nicolo informs his friends about his emergency trip to Singapore, but avoids Nikki’s company.
554	"Episode 554"	September 1, 2014	13% (1st)
Nikki surprises Nicolo with a thoughtful gesture before his flight to Singapore. Meanwhile, the other helpers discover Joma's meddling with Anastacio and Fe's Facebook messages.
555	"Episode 555"	September 2, 2014	13.5% (1st)
Maya advises Richard to get to know Joni first before passing judgment on the young intern. Fe shockingly discovers that Joma entangles her into a romantic commitment with Anastacio using her Facebook account.
556	"Episode 556"	September 3, 2014	13.2% (1st)
Due to their conflicting work schedules, Ricky and Maya fail to spend quality time together. Nikki encourages Luke to court Joni if he really likes her. Meanwhile, Fe gives Joma the cold shoulder despite his efforts at asking for her forgiveness.
557	"Episode 557"	September 4, 2014	13.6% (1st)
Despite their conflicting schedules, Ricky and Maya start making an effort to see each other while at home. Fe finally softens her heart to Joma. Meanwhile, Abby chances upon a stray kitten and brings it back home.
558	"Episode 558"	September 5, 2014	13.5% (1st)
Maya gives Richard a special surprise in their bedroom. However, their intimate time together comes to an abrupt halt when Abby calls them to ask if she can keep a stray kitten she recently took home.
559	"Episode 559"	September 8, 2014	12.8% (1st)
With Fe exuding a rather gloomy disposition lately, Maya suggests to Joma that he convince Fe to reactivate her Facebook account so she can reconnect with Anastacio again. Luke asks permission from Richard if he can bring Joni on a date.
560	"Episode 560"	September 9, 2014	12.6% (1st)
Richard prepares a surprise for Maya, and they resume their special intimate date which was interrupted days before.
561	"Episode 561"	September 10, 2014	12.7% (1st)
Richard and Maya fail to resume their intimate night yet again, as they discover that Luke contracted intestinal flu following his date with Joni at a park. Richard then summons Joni into his office the next morning.
562	"Episode 562"	September 11, 2014	12% (1st)
While still recovering from his illness, Luke tries to reach out to Joni and he soon gets a notion that she is avoiding him. He confirms it when he learns that Richard summoned her recently.
563	"Episode 563"	September 12, 2014	11.7% (1st)
Richard and Maya develop a brief misunderstanding over the phone due to a conflict with their plans for the day. Coming back to the office following his sickness, Luke confronts Joni on her coldness toward him.
564	"Episode 564"	September 15, 2014	12.9% (1st)
Fe reminisces her special friendship with Anastacio in the past. She looks back on how she let a possible great love slip away. Nikki chances upon a secret letter Nicolo wrote for her, explaining his true feelings for her.
565	"Episode 565"	September 16, 2014	14.4% (1st)
After arguing with Maya and getting good advice from Fe, Richard decides to support Luke with the latter's wish to court Joni. Luke soon goes to the tenement to see Joni. Nikki still feels bothered with Nicolo's revelation in his letter.
566	"Episode 566"	September 17, 2014	14.5% (1st)
Anastacio is thrilled to bits when Fe gives him consent to visit her. However, Fe almost believes that meeting Anastacio is not meant for her when she forgot the password of her Facebook account that serves as their only means of communication.
567	"Episode 567"	September 18, 2014	14.2% (1st)
Joni finally meets Luke's family over lunch. The initial awkwardness on the dining table eventually turns into meaningful conversations and hearty jests. Luke later asks Joni if he may court her.
568	"Episode 568"	September 19, 2014	14.3% (1st)
Maya expresses her misgivings about Celeste after learning her indecision over investing for the training institute and her inconsiderate suspension of an employee of Lim Aviation.
569	"Episode 569"	September 22, 2014	13.3% (1st)
Nikki becomes confused with her own feelings after hearing straight from Nicolo that he still loves her after all this time.
570	"Episode 570"	September 23, 2014	13.9% (1st)
Maya realizes that she feels a tinge of jealousy toward Celeste, after Richard goes home drunk from a party she initiated. Meanwhile, an emotional moment ensues in the Lim mansion as Fe and Anastacio finally meet face-to-face after several decades.
571	"Episode 571"	September 24, 2014	13.1% (1st)
After having dinner with the Lims, Anastacio and Fe discuss the time she left without saying goodbye, his years of endless search for her, and their joy of seeing each other again.
572	"Episode 572"	September 25, 2014	14.4% (1st)
Sky and Sunshine's second birthday party commences, with the Lims and their family's friends all coming to celebrate. Teresita and Esmeralda discuss how Richard and Maya's family has turned out to be such a happy and loving one.
573	"Episode 573"	September 26, 2014	13.7% (1st)
In the morning after Sky and Sunshine's party, Fe and Anastacio both become bedridden with flu, which Maya explains as a possible case of "twin souls" being apart from each other.
574	"Episode 574"	September 29, 2014	13% (1st)
Fearing to let go of his longtime guardian, Richard expresses his apprehensions on Fe’s rekindled romance with Anastacio. However, Fe’s apparent sadness leads Richard to retract everything he said and even allows Anastacio to pay Fe another visit.
575	"Episode 575"	September 30, 2014	13.9% (1st)
Fe finally admits her feelings for Anastacio, leading the old man to pop the question that takes Fe by surprise. On the last day of his internship, Luke carries out a surprise dinner for Joni with the help of Nikki and Nicolo.
576	"Episode 576"	October 1, 2014	14.4% (1st)
Soon after her work is done, Maya hurriedly prepares for the gratitude ball of Pilipinas Aviation Society (PAS), and her excitement escalates upon finding Richard’s luxurious gifts for her.
577	"Episode 577"	October 2, 2014	13.4% (1st)
After learning about Anastacio’s wedding proposal to Fe, Richard takes it upon himself to assure Fe of his support to anything that will make her happy. With that, Fe finally divulges her decision to marry Anastacio, much to the delight of the Lims.
578	"Episode 578"	October 3, 2014	14.7% (1st)
Following Nikki and Abby’s successful stage play, the Lims throw a surprise bridal shower for Fe. Fe later reminds Richard and Maya to maintain peace and happiness in their home.
579	"Episode 579"	October 6, 2014	16% (1st)
The Lims arrive at a beach resort in Zambales to attend Fe and Anastacio’s most awaited wedding. While everyone is busy preparing for the said event, Maya and Richard present the soon-to-be-married couple with a new house.
580	"Episode 580"	October 7, 2014	14.7% (1st)
With their loved ones as witnesses, Fe and Anastacio tie the knot to seal their promise of everlasting love.
581	"Episode 581"	October 8, 2014	14.8% (1st)
Following their blissful wedding ceremony, Fe and Anastacio start a married life together in their new house. While the Lims are yet to get used to Fe’s absence in their house, Richard faces trouble at work as news of a cargo plane crash reaches him.
582	"Episode 582"	October 9, 2014	14.4% (1st)
As Nikki chooses to bond with her siblings than to hang out with her friends, Nicolo decides to visit Nikki at home, where he tries to get close with Abby, Sky, and Sunshine. However, a sudden mishap spoils Nicolo’s courting strategy.
583	"Episode 583"	October 10, 2014	15.1% (1st)
Problem arises at Lim Aviation Services as its rival company, JJ Aviation, releases a malicious statement regarding the cargo plane crash. While Richard tries to shrug off his apprehensions, Maya remains supportive amid her husband’s ordeal.
584	"Episode 584"	October 13, 2014	13.7% (1st)
Richard faces serious trouble in his company as the Asia Cargo Corporation (ACC) releases an official statement that reveals mechanical failure as the possible cause of their plane crash.
585	"Episode 585"	October 14, 2014	13.3% (1st)
Richard continues to seal his lips about his predicament at work, but Maya soon meets with Celeste and finds out about the statement of Asia Cargo Corporation (ACC) against Lim Aviation Services (LAS).
586	"Episode 586"	October 15, 2014	12.7% (1st)
Richard’s problems at work continue to pile up as the major clients of Lim Aviation Services (LAS) cut their ties with the company, which later prompts the board members to put the blame on Richard.
587	"Episode 587"	October 16, 2014	14.2% (1st)
The ongoing confusion at Lim Aviation Services (LAS) takes a turn for the worse for Richard as the board members cast enough votes to oust him as the CEO.
588	"Episode 588"	October 17, 2014	13.7% (1st)
Heeding Kute’s advice, Maya shrugs off her sadness and resolves to spread love and optimism to the Lims amid Richard’s ordeal at work.
589	"Episode 589"	October 20, 2014	16.3% (1st)
Knowing that the majority of the board members do not trust him anymore in handling Lim Aviation Services (LAS), Richard finds it best to file a resignation, much to the surprise of his family and his colleagues.
590	"Episode 590"	October 21, 2014	14.4% (1st)
Soon after cutting his ties with Lim Aviation Services (LAS), Richard learns that the remaining shareholders deny that the main reason for the company’s reorganization is its conflict with Asia Cargo Corporation (ACC).
591	"Episode 591"	October 22, 2014	15.7% (1st)
With Maya’s encouragement, Richard goes on with his plans to put up an aviation school. Insufficient funds prove to be a major setback in Richard’s new business venture, until the CEO of JJ Aviation surprises Richard with a tempting job offer.
592	"Episode 592"	October 23, 2014	15% (1st)
In need of enough funds for his aviation school, Richard agrees to Maya’s suggestion of moving into a smaller house.
593	"Episode 593"	October 24, 2014	14.9% (1st)
Despite their initial sadness at the thought of moving into a smaller house, Abby, Nikki, and Luke soon learn to accept the change in their lives when Maya assures that they can always create happy memories regardless of where they live.
594	"Episode 594"	October 27, 2014	14.8% (1st)
Richard apologizes to his parents for losing the company they founded, but Roberto stresses that he is even prouder of his son for living with integrity. Teresita, Kute, and Cho arrive in Manila to help the Lims in moving into their new house.
595	"Episode 595"	October 28, 2014	14.8% (1st)
After wrapping up their garage sale at the bazaar, Maya, Richard, and their children shed bittersweet tears upon recalling the unforgettable memories they shared in the mansion.
596	"Episode 596"	October 29, 2014	16.3% (1st)
The Lims gladly settle in to their new house, and while Teresita tells Kute her worries on how Richard and the kids will adjust to their new way of living, Richard asks Maya to help him create happy memories in their new home.
597	"Episode 597"	October 30, 2014	13.9% (1st)
Richard kicks off his day on a bad note as he overheard his new neighbors talking behind his back. After having a heated conversation with Julian of JJ Aviation, Richard’s disgust becomes more evident during his meeting with the staff of LAI.
598	"Episode 598"	October 31, 2014	14.7% (1st)
After landing a household job near the Lim residence, Lea makes the most of her last day as Sky and Sunshine’s babysitter. Meanwhile, Richard becomes surprised as his former assistant applies for a job in Lim Aviation Institute (LAI).
599	"Episode 599"	November 3, 2014	14.9% (1st)
As the launch of Lim Aviation Institute (LAI) draws near, Richard finalizes his plans and marketing strategies for the school. Meanwhile, the Lim siblings take the initiative to help their parents with the house expenses.
600	"Episode 600"	November 4, 2014	14.8% (1st)
The Lims start a new endeavor as Richard launches his aviation school, the Lim Aviation Institute (LAI). Despite the successful event, Richard remains sad after noticing that the high school representatives he invited did not show up.
601	"Episode 601"	November 5, 2014	13.7% (1st)
Richard visits a school to invite senior high school students to enroll at Lim Aviation Institute (LAI). However, Richard notices that the students are more interested with the issue concerning Lim Aviation Services (LAS) than his new school.
602	"Episode 602"	November 6, 2014	14.2% (1st)
After realizing that Luke is struggling to balance his time between her, his studies, and his family's new business, Joni comes up with a drastic decision to break up with him, thinking that it would help him regain his focus.
603	"Episode 603"	November 7, 2014	15.2% (1st)
While Luke is having a hard time accepting Joni's decision of ending their relationship, Richard draws strength from his family to get through his ordeal. Richard finds out that Luke and Nikki have been working at Circle Café behind his back.
604	"Episode 604"	November 10, 2014	13.7% (1st)
Richard becomes frustrated with himself upon discovering that Nikki and Luke are doing part-time jobs to help him out. As Richard undergoes a tough time, Maya never leaves her husband's side, coming up with her own ways to lift up his spirit.
605	"Episode 605"	November 11, 2014	14.8% (1st)
While Richard sets off to Malaysia to try his luck in convincing foreign students to enroll at Lim Aviation Institute (LAI), Celeste faces problems due to the incompetence of her newly hired engineers at Lim Aviation Services (LAS).
606	"Episode 606"	November 12, 2014	14.3% (1st)
Richard inadvertently offends Maya when he explains why he is less than happy even if Lim Aviation Institute (LAI) is starting to gain new applicants.
607	"Episode 607"	November 13, 2014	14.2% (1st)
After spending their third wedding anniversary in San Nicolas with the dela Rosas, Richard and Maya make their way to the airport to get back to Manila.
608	"Episode 608"	November 14, 2014	15% (1st)
From posting a crazy note at a restaurant to drinking tuba (coconut wine) in the wee hours of the night, Richard and Maya make sure that they enjoy their time together as much as they could before going back to their real world in Manila.
609	"Episode 609"	November 17, 2014	14.2% (1st)
Bad news welcomes Richard back to the Lim Aviation Institute (LAI) as he discovers that two of their potential enrollees have pulled out their applications.
610	"Episode 610"	November 18, 2014	14.5% (1st)
Richard discovers that Roberto and Esmeralda have bought three Cessna 172 airplanes for Lim Aviation Institute. Soon, Richard is reunited with Engr. Yamaguchi and the other senior engineers of Lim Aviation Services when they decide to apply at LAI.
611	"Episode 611"	November 19, 2014	15.8% (1st)
With the Christmas season fast approaching, the Lims work hand in hand in putting up their Christmas tree. They also light up the house with their festive Christmas decorations. Luke and Joni decide to give their relationship another chance.
612	"Episode 612"	November 20, 2014	14.6% (1st)
Roberto, Esmeralda, and the dela Rosas arrive at the Lim residence to spend the Christmas season with Richard, Maya, and the kids. Richard, Maya, and their entire family have a wonderful time celebrating the Christmas Eve.
613	"Episode 613"	November 21, 2014	16.3% (1st)
The Lims and the dela Rosas cap off their Yuletide celebration with a fun family pictorial. Soon enough, Richard marks another milestone as Lim Aviation Institute (LAI) holds its first graduation ceremony.
614	"Episode 614"	November 24, 2014	13% (1st)
After clearing his name in the cargo plane crash, Richard faces the media as he agrees to do an interview with the Philippine Daily News with Celeste. Celeste reveals her decision to step down as the CEO of Lim Aviation Services (LAS).
615	"Episode 615"	November 25, 2014	14.4% (1st)
Despite his hesitance, Richard hears out the pleas of the Lim Aviation Services (LAS) employees as he decides to return as the company's CEO. While Richard takes a shot at saving LAS, Maya starts her new job as Time Airways' new line administrator.
616	"Episode 616"	November 26, 2014	15.7% (1st)
Richard becomes extremely happy to go back to Lim Aviation Services (LAS), knowing that he made the right decision to return to his first home.
617	"Episode 617"	November 27, 2014	16.3% (1st)
Richard takes Maya to the beautiful city of Vigan to celebrate his wife's birthday. Nostalgia overwhelms Richard and Maya as the trip reminds the couple of their fondest memories together—from the first moment they met to their fairy tale wedding.
618	"Episode 618"	November 28, 2014	19.6% (1st)
Before heading back home, Maya and Richard spend their vacation in a nostalgic mood as they talk about the fondest moments they shared as a couple. Richard goes out of his way to give his wife an unforgettable birthday celebration.
