= Regine Velasquez on screen and stage =

Filipino actress filmography

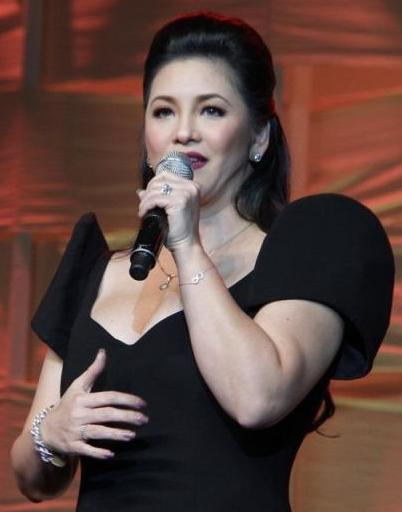
Velasquez at the Jollibee Family Values Awards in September 2015

Filipino entertainer Regine Velasquez has appeared in motion pictures and television programs. She made her screen debut with a minor role in the 1988 comedy film The Untouchable Family. She went on to appear in supporting roles in the comedies Pik Pak Boom (1988) and Elvis and James 2 (1990). Velasquez made her stage debut in 1992 with the Musical Theatre Philippines production of Romualdo Ramos and Tony Velasquez's Kenkoy Loves Rosing. Her breakthrough came when she played the title role in the film Wanted Perfect Mother (1996). The same year, she starred in the musical comedy Do Re Mi alongside Donna Cruz and Mikee Cojuangco. Among Velasquez's next releases were the fantasy comedy Honey Nasa Langit Na Ba Ako? (1998) and Joyce Bernal's romantic comedy Dahil May Isang Ikaw (1999) opposite Aga Muhlach. Her first leading television role was in a 2000 episode of the IBC-13 anthology series Habang May Buhay.

Velasquez's profile continued to grow in the 2000s as she took on starring roles in two lucrative romantic comedy films. She featured as a prominent singer desperate for a normal life in Kailangan Ko'y Ikaw (2000), and she re-teamed with Bernal and Muhlach in Pangako Ikaw Lang (2001)—Velasquez's biggest commercial success to date, for which she received the Box Office Entertainment Award for Box Office Queen. In 2002, she appeared in an episode of ABS-CBN's drama series, Maalaala Mo Kaya, playing an intellectually disabled woman who develops a romantic relationship with a younger man—a role that earned her the Star Award for Best Actress. That year, she also portrayed a mundane and undesirable mail sorter in the drama Ikaw Lamang Hanggang Ngayon, which garnered her a Young Critics Circle nomination for Best Actress. In 2003, Velasquez starred with Christopher de Leon in the romantic comedy Pangarap Ko ang Ibigin Ka and played Darna in the superhero film Captain Barbell.

In 2004, Velasquez made her first prime time television appearance in the drama series Forever in My Heart. Two years later, she starred as a con woman in the romantic comedy Till I Met You with Robin Padilla. Her performance in the 2007 film Paano Kita Iibigin earned her nominations for Best Actress at the FAMAS and Luna Award. In 2008, she lent her voice to the eponymous character in the animated film Urduja, and returned to television in the comedy series Ako si Kim Samsoon. She went on to play a facially disfigured aspiring singer in the musical series Diva (2010), and appeared opposite Dingdong Dantes in the comedy series I Heart You, Pare! (2011). In 2013, she won the Golden Screen Award for Best Actress for her performance as an identity document forger in the comedy Of All the Things. Three years later, she starred in the satirical comedy Mrs. Recto and the comedy series Poor Señorita.

Velasquez expanded her career into reality television talent shows, serving as a presenter on Star for a Night (2002), Pinoy Pop Superstar (2004), and The Clash (2018), and as a judge on StarStruck (2015) and Idol Philippines (2019). In addition, she had episode arc guest roles in the fantasy series Darna (2009) and Mulawin vs. Ravena (2017).

== Film ==
Regine Velasquez's film credits
Year (Note: Refers to the film's earliest release)	Title	Role	Notes	Ref(s)
1988	The Untouchable Family	Sheila		
1988	Pik Pak Boom	Irma		
1990	Elvis and James 2	—		
1996	Wanted: Perfect Mother	Sam		
1996	Do Re Mi	Reggie		
1998	Honey Nasa Langit Na Ba Ako?	Marian		
1999	Dahil May Isang Ikaw	Anya		
2000	Kailangan Ko'y Ikaw	Francine Natra		
2001	Pangako... Ikaw Lang	Cristina		
2002	Ikaw Lamang Hanggang Ngayon	Katherine		
2003	Pangarap Ko ang Ibigin Ka	Alex Guzman		
2003	Captain Barbell	Cielo / Darna		
2004	Masikip sa Dibdib: The Boobita Rose Story	Herself	Cameo	
2006	Till I Met You	Luisa		
2007	Paano Kita Iibigin	Martee		
2008	Urduja	Urduja (voice)	Animated film	
2009	Kimmy Dora: Kambal sa Kiyeme	—	Cameo	
2009	Oh, My Girl! A Laugh Story...	—	Cameo	
2009	Yaya & Angelina: The Spoiled Brat Movie	Old Yaya	Cameo	
2012	Of All the Things	Bernadette		
2016	Mrs. Recto	Clara		
2019	Unforgettable	Janet	Cameo	
2019	Yours Truly, Shirley	Shirley		
2019	The Mall, the Merrier!	Herself	Cameo	

== Television ==
Regine Velasquez's television credits
Year	Title	Role	Notes	Ref(s)
1986–present	Eat Bulaga!	Herself	Recurring guest performer	
1998	S.O.P.	Herself	Host	
2000	Habang May Buhay	—	Episode: "Sa Puso Ko'y Ikaw"	
2001	Larawan: A Special Drama Engagement	—		
2001	Maalaala Mo Kaya	Abby	Episode: "Lobo"	
2002	Star for a Night	Herself	Host	
2003	Search for a Star	Herself	Host	
2004	Forever in My Heart	Angeline Sagrado		
2004	Pinoy Pop Superstar	Herself	Host	
2007	Celebrity Duets	Herself	Host	
2008	Maalaala Mo Kaya	Cathy	Episode: "Dalandan (Great Love)"	
2008	The Best of Me	Herself	Television special	
2008	Songbird	Herself	Host	
2008	Ako si Kim Samsoon	Kim Samsoon Buot		
2009	Totoy Bato	Anna Molina		
2009	Are You the Next Big Star?	Herself	Host	
2009	Roots to Riches	Herself	Television special	
2009	SRO Cinemaserye	Herself	Episode: "The Eva Castillo Story"	
2009	Darna	Elektra	Season 2	
2009	After the Rain	Herself	Television special	
2010	Diva	Sampaguita Fernandez		
2010	Party Pilipinas	Herself	Host	
2011	I Heart You, Pare!	Antonia Estrella		
2012	H.O.T. TV	Herself	Host	
2012	Sarap Diva	Herself	Host	
2013	Sunday All Stars	Herself	Host	
2013	Awit ng Pasko	Herself	Television special	
2014	Bet ng Bayan	Herself	Host	
2014	Himig ng Pasko	—	Television special	
2016	Poor Señorita	Rita Villon		
2017	Full House Tonight	Herself	Host	
2017	Mulawin vs. Ravena	Sandawa		
2018	The Clash	Herself	Host	
2018–present	ASAP	Herself	Host	
2019	Idol Philippines	Herself	Judge	
2020	My Single Lady	Mama Reg		
2022–2026	Magandang Buhay	Herself	Host	
2022	Idol Philippines	Herself	Judge	
2022	Drag Race Philippines	Herself	Guest judge	
2025–present	It's Showtime	Herself - Tawag ng Tanghalan Hurado		
2025	Idol Kids Philippines	Herself Judge		

== Stage ==
Regine Velasquez's theatre credits
Year(s)	Production	Theater	Role(s)	Notes	Ref.
1992	Kenkoy Loves Rosing	Music Museum	Rosing	A production of Musical Theatre Philippines (Musicat) by Celeste Legaspi and Girlie Rodis, based on the Philippine comics series by writer Romualdo Ramos and illustrator Tony Velasquez	
1995	Noli Me Tángere	Cultural Center of the Philippines	María Clara	From playwright and musical director Ryan Cayabyab	

== Music videos ==
=== As a performer ===
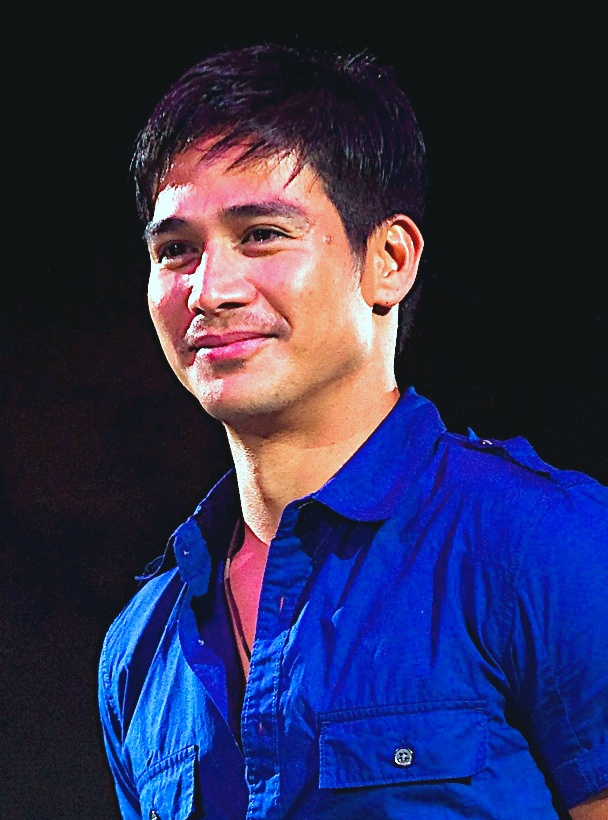
Piolo Pascual appears in the music video for "Paano Kita Iibigin".

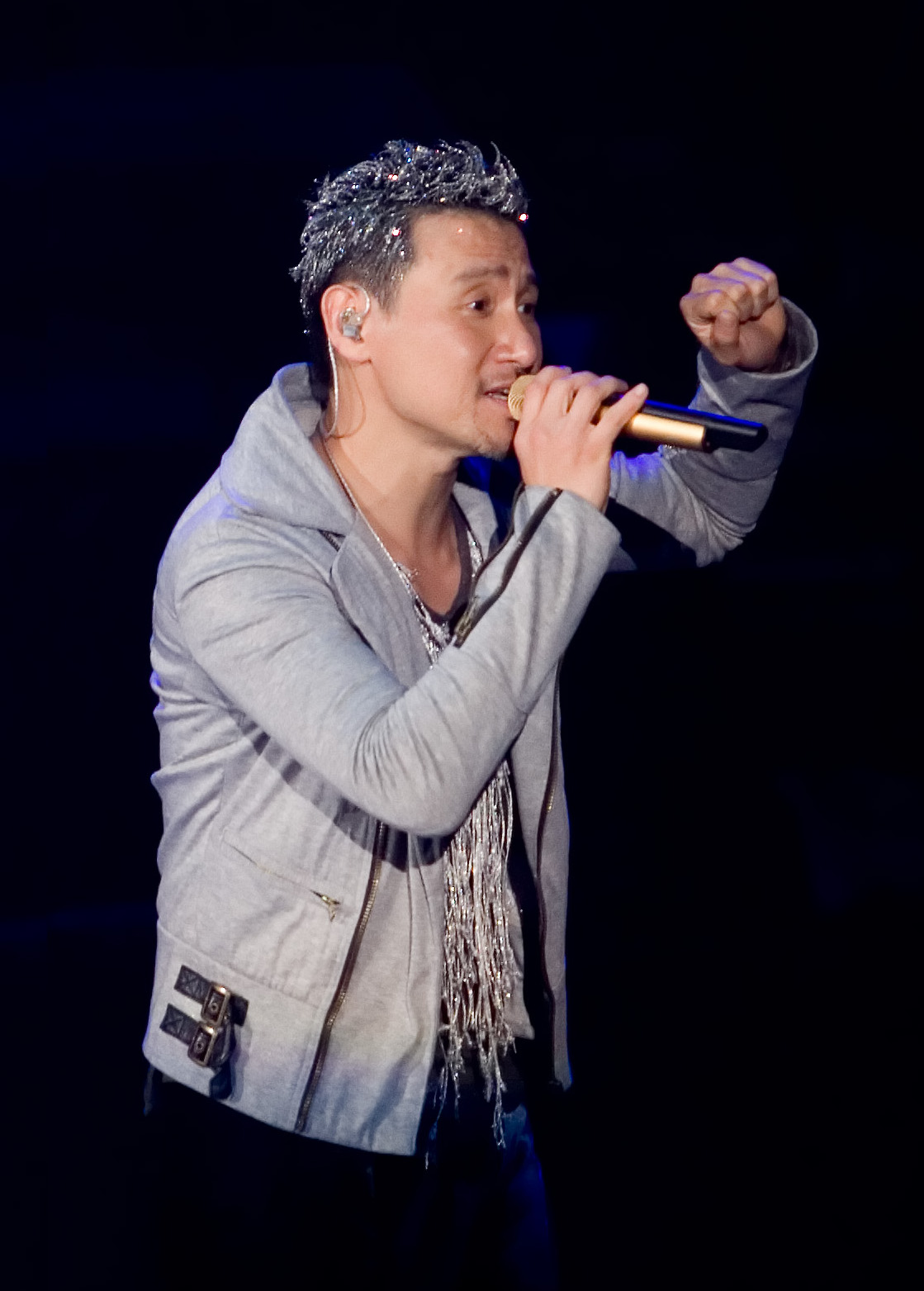
Jacky Cheung features in the music video of "In Love with You".

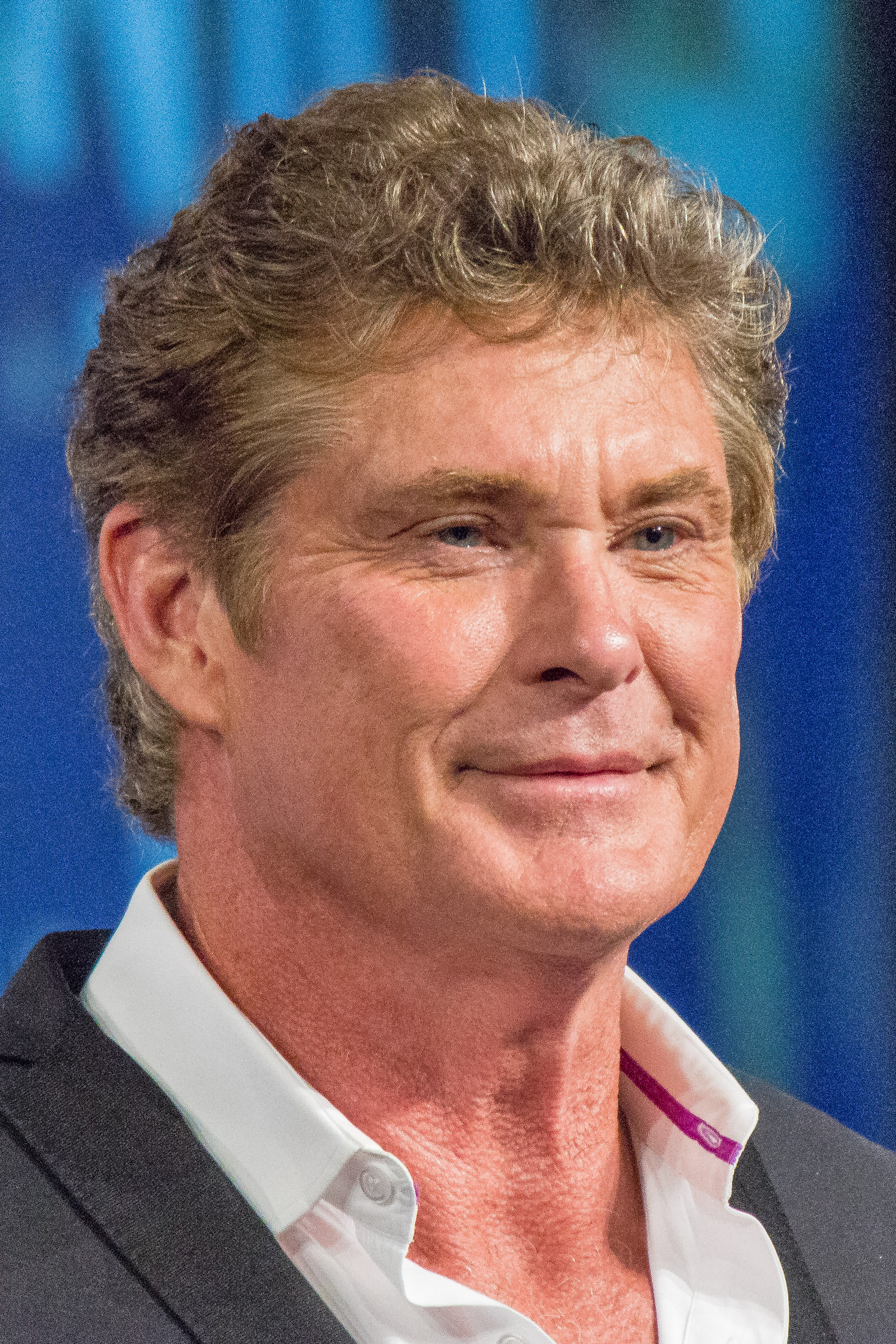
With David Hasselhoff, she released "More Than Words Can Say" for the soundtrack of his film Legacy.

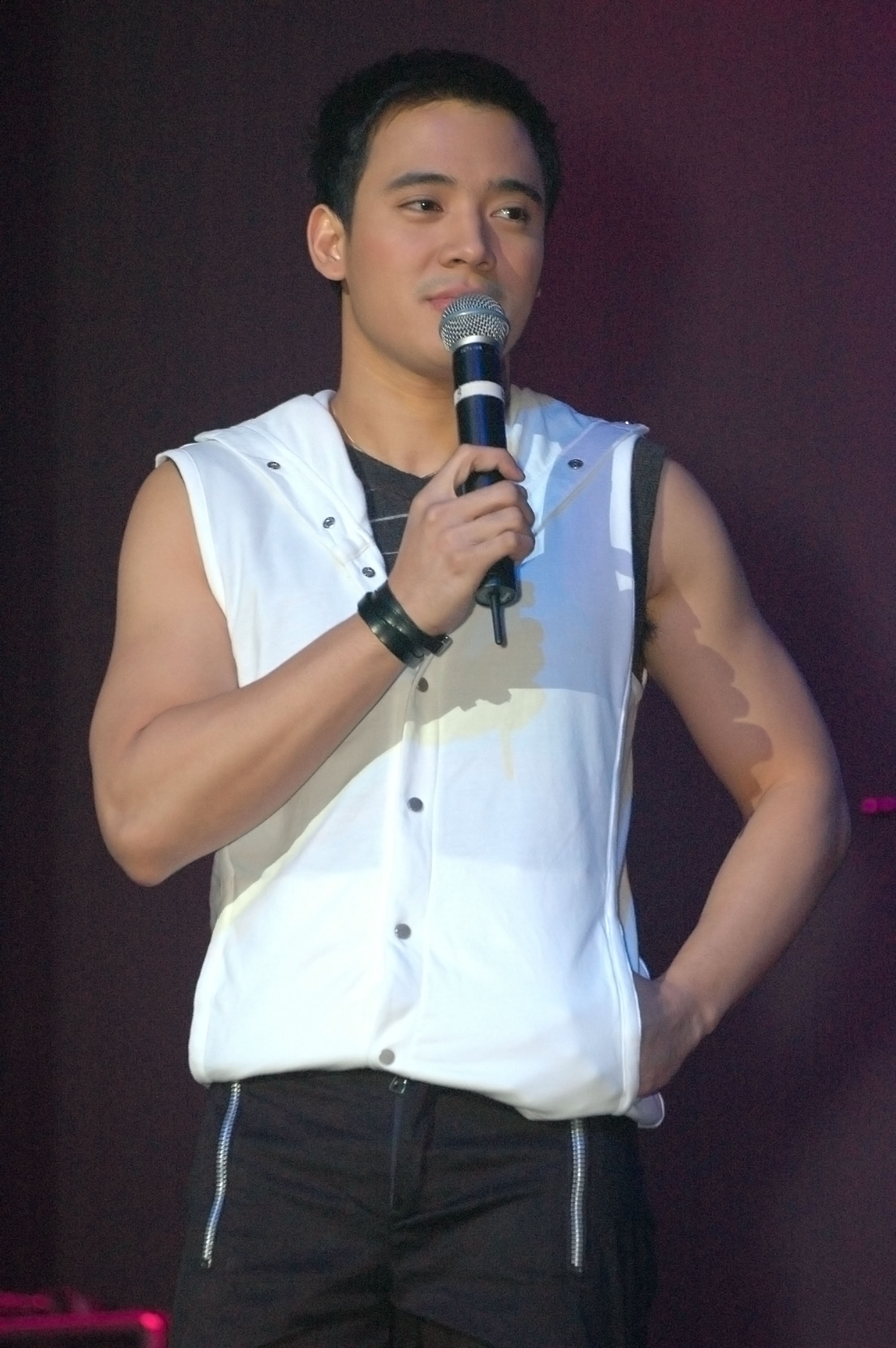
Erik Santos collaborated with Velasquez on "Bakit Ba Iniibig Ka".

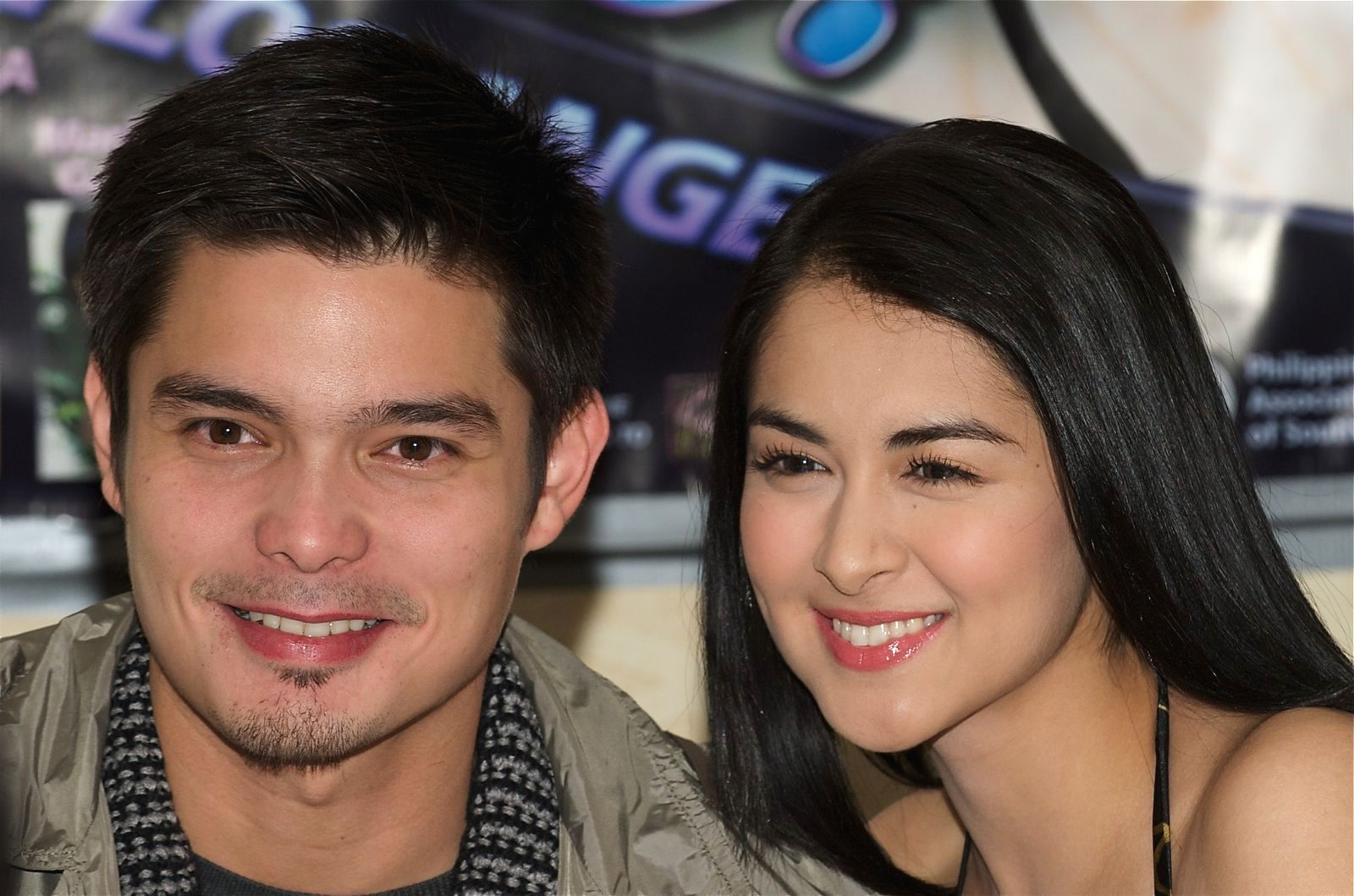
Marian Rivera (pictured, right) and Dingdong Dantes both make an appearance in "You Don't Know".

Regine Velasquez's music video credits as a main performer
Title	Year	Other performer(s)	Album	Ref.
"Please Be Careful with My Heart"	1989	Jose Mari Chan	Constant Change	
"In Love with You"	1994	Jacky Cheung	Listen Without Prejudice	
"I Would Die for You"	1994	None	Listen Without Prejudice	
"Follow the Sun"	1994	None	Listen Without Prejudice	
"My Love Emotion"	1995	None	My Love Emotion	
"You've Made Me Stronger"	1995	None	My Love Emotion	
"Fly"	1996	None	Retro	
"I Can't Help It"	1996	Remus Choy	Retro	
"More Than Words Can Say"	1997	David Hasselhoff	Unsolo (Note: Velasquez and Hasselhoff recorded "More Than Words Can Say" for his film Legacy in 1998; it was included in Velasquez's compilation album Unsolo in 2000.)	
"How Could You Leave"	1998	None	Drawn	
"On the Wings of Love"	1999	None	R2K	
"For the Love of You"	1999	Gabby Eigenmann; KC Montero	R2K	
"Fallin'"	1999	None	R2K	
"Lost Without Your Love"	1999	None	R2K	
"One Love"	1999	None	R2K	
"In Your Eyes"	1999	None	R2K	
"Mac Arthur Park"	1999	KC Montero	R2K	
"Music of Goodbye"	1999	None	R2K	
"Written in the Sand"	1999	None	None (Note: The single and music video for "Written in the Sand" premiered during the international broadcast of the BBC television special 2000 Today.)	
"Kailangan Ko'y Ikaw"	2000	None	Kailangan Ko'y Ikaw	
"Pangako"	2001	None	Pangako Ikaw Lang	
"Evergreen"	2001	Janno Gibbs	Divas & I	
"To Reach You"	2001	None	Reigne	
"Hanggang Ngayon"	2002	Ogie Alcasid	A Better Man	
"Sa Aking Pag-iisa"	2002	None	Reigne	
"Pangarap Ko ang Ibigin Ka"	2003	None	Pangarap Ko ang Ibigin Ka	
"Tell Me"	2003	Ariel Rivera	In My Life	
"Sa Piling Mo"	2003	None	Captain Barbell	
"Pangarap Ko'y Ikaw"	2004	None	Covers Volume 1	
"Forevermore"	2004	None	Covers Volume 1	
"Say That You Love Me"	2004	None	Covers Volume 1	
"Minsan Lang Kitang Iibigin"	2004	None	Covers Volume 1	
"Hold Me in Your Arms"	2006	None	Covers Volume 2	
"Bakit Ba Iniibig Ka"	2006	Erik Santos	Loving You Now	
"Till I Met You"	2006	None	Till I Met You	
"Don't Go"	2006	None	Till I Met You	
"Paano Kita Iibigin"	2007	Piolo Pascual	Paano Kita Iibigin	
"Tell Me That You Love Me"	2008	None	Low Key	
"And I Love You So"	2008	None	Low Key	
"You Don't Know"	2010	None	Fantasy	
"Takipsilim"	2010	Gloc-9	Liham at Lihim	
"Makita Kang Muli"	2015	Ebe Dancel	Bawat Daan	
"Tadhana"	2017	None	R3.0	
"Hugot"	2017	None	R3.0	
"I Am Beautiful"	2019	None	None (Note: Velasquez released "I Am Beautiful" as a promotional video for the 2019 campaign of Australian cosmetics brand BYS.)	
"Istorya"	2020	None	None (Note: "Istorya" was digitally released as a non-album single in 2019.)	
"Ipinagpanata Kita"	2021	Davey Langit	None (Note: "Ipinagpanata Kita" was digitally released as a non-album single in 2021.)	
"ILY"	2022	Ogie Alcasid	None (Note: "ILY" was digitally released as a non-album single in 2022.)	
"Bitaw"	2023	Poppert Bernadas	None (Note: "Bitaw" was digitally released as a non-album single in 2023.)	

=== Guest appearances ===
Regine Velasquez's music video credits as a guest performer
Title	Year	Performer(s)	Album	Ref.
"Sana"	2001	Ogie Alcasid	A Better Man	
"Close to Where You Are"	2005	Jona Viray	On My Own	
"Mahal Mo Rin Ako"	2006	Gabby Eigenmann	Sa Di Kalayuan	

== Video albums ==
Regine Velasquez's music video album credits
Title	Album details	Notes
R2K: The Millennium Special	Released: January 2000; Label: Viva; Formats: VHS	Contains the television special featuring live performances of singles from Velasquez's studio album R2K, including unreleased music videos of "Mac Arthur Park" and "Music of Goodbye"
R2K: The Concert	Released: June 2000; Label: Viva; Formats: VHS	Limited release of the concert television special in support of Velasquez's studio album R2K
Regine Live sa Antipolo	Released: January 2001; Label: Viva; Formats: VHS, VCD, DVD	Features live performances filmed at the Ynares Center in Antipolo, Rizal, on December 30, 2000
Two for the Knight	Released: March 2002; Label: Viva; Format: VHS, VCD, DVD	Contains the concert television special featuring live performances by Velasquez and Brian McKnight in February 2002

== Commercials ==
Regine Velasquez's commercial and endorsement credits
Year	Company or product	Promoting	Description	Ref.
1991	Unilever	Soap: Lux	Velasquez appears in a series of commercials for Lux's campaign alongside other celebrities, including Sharon Cuneta and Pops Fernandez.	
1994	Wendy's	Fast food restaurant chain	Velasquez promotes the fast food restaurant chain and is also featured in a series of commercials as part of the company's 1994-96 campaign.	
2001	Digitel	Telecommunications service	Promoted Digitel's fixed line telephone and mobile phone services	
2003	Nestlé Philippines	Ice cream	In the ad, Velasquez is featured in two contrasting scenes to promote the company's "Back2Back" ice cream varieties.	
2004	Splash Corporation	Hand and body lotion: SkinWhite	The commercial features Velasquez singing "Shine" against a LED screen. Filipino actor Marian Rivera is featured in the music video.	
2005	Department of Tourism and Smart Communications	Travel campaign	Velasquez shot a series of commercials and is featured in a montage of major travel destinations in the Philippines as part of the executive department's tourism initiative from 2005 to 2007.	
2006	Magic Sing	Karaoke microphone	The commercial was made in conjunction with the Philippine Department of Tourism and Magic Sing's tourism campaign using the karaoke platform.	
2007	Belo Medical Group	Cosmetics: Belo Essentials	Promoting Belo Medical Group's skin whitening products, Velasquez also stars alongside Lucy Torres-Gomez and Zsa Zsa Padilla.	
2009	Bench	Fragrance: Reigne / Songbird	In partnership with the clothing brand, Velasquez is featured in a series of promotional shoots for her fragrances, "Reigne" and "Songbird".	
2010	Benigno Aquino III presidential campaign	Campaign song	The recording and music video was used as the campaign song during the 2010 presidential campaign of Benigno Aquino III.	
2010	Nestlé Philippines	Powdered milk drink: Bear Brand	The commercial shows Velasquez narrating her career beginnings through a montage of photos. At the conclusion, she is seen with a glass of milk at hand, surrounded by school kids inspiring them to reach for their dreams.	
2011	Nestlé Philippines	Nestlé Philippines theme	The commercial was used to promote the company's centennial celebrations. Velasquez appears singing "Pag-ibig" as clips of previous Nestlé commercials are flashed in the background.	
2012	Sun Life Financial	Life insurance	Also featuring Velasquez's husband Ogie Alcasid and their son Nathaniel James, the ad shows the couple overjoyed with their newborn and contemplating his future.	
2012	Procter & Gamble	Disposable diapers: Pampers	Velasquez alongside Alcasid and their son are featured in a series of commercials promoting Pampers Dry Disposable Diapers.	
2015	Nestlé Philippines	Milk formula: Nestokid	Velasquez and her son, Nathaniel James, are featured promoting the brand's toddler milk formula.	
2016	PLDT Inc.	Tablet internet phone and smartwatch	Velasquez and her son, Nathaniel James, are seen unwraping a smartwatch and trying out its different features.	
2018	Jollibee	Fast food restaurant chain	Velasquez and her son, Nathaniel James, are featured promoting the fast food restaurant chain's signature product Jolly Spaghetti.	
2019	ADP Pharma	Multivitamin: Propan TLC	Velasquez and her son, Nathaniel James, are featured promoting the multivitamin syrup that helps boost and maintain appetite and increase immunity.	
2019	BYS	Cosmetics: Reigne	Velasquez released a line of make-up called "Reigne" and is featured in the promotional music video as the beauty brand's ambassador.	
2020	Procter & Gamble	Detergent: Ariel	Velasquez is featured in a series of commercials promoting the detergent's effectiveness in comparison to other detergents against stains and malodor.	
2021	Century Pacific Food	Canned food: Argentina Meats	Velasquez alongside Alcasid are featured promoting the food company's canned ground pork mix.	
2021	Procter & Gamble	Cough medicine: Vicks	Velasquez is featured promoting the brand's cold medicine and multivitamin capsules.	

== See also ==
- List of awards and nominations received by Regine Velasquez
