= Roots to Riches =

2009 TV special by Regine Velasquez

- Title card
- Directed by: Louie Ignacio
- Starring: Regine Velasquez
- Country of origin: Philippines
- Original language: Tagalog

Production
- Executive producers: Wilma V. Galvante; Mae Zambrano
- Producer: Darling de Jesus
- Running time: 120 minutes
- Production company: Aria Productions

Original release
- Network: GMA
- Release: May 24, 2009

Roots to Riches is an autobiographical documentary concert special by Filipino singer Regine Velasquez. It originally aired on May 24, 2009, in the Philippines on GMA Network. The special follows Velasquez's early childhood beginnings as an aspiring singer competing on talent shows to the influential entertainer she is today, while providing an insight into her journey with stardom and detailing various aspects of her professional and personal life. It is interspersed with a series of flashback re-enactments portraying significant events in her life and career. The program includes a compilation of interviews with key people that have been instrumental to the trajectory of her success over the course of several years.

A celebration of Velasquez's 39th birthday, the two-hour special is spliced with musical performances filmed at the Centro Escolar University in Velasquez's hometown of Malolos, Bulacan. It was directed by Louie Ignacio and produced by Aria Productions. Raul Mitra served as the music director, with guests appearances from Pilita Corrales, Jose Mari Chan, Dingdong Dantes, Pops Fernandez, and Dennis Trillo and a special appearance by her former competition rival Eva Castillo.

== Background ==
Regine Velasquez started singing at age six, and had unorthodox voice training with her father, where she was immersed neck-deep in the sea and would go through vocal runs. She credits this method for strengthening her core and stomach muscles, and developing her lung capacity. When Velasquez was nine, her family moved to Bulacan, where she started competing in talent shows. In 1984, aged fourteen, she auditioned for the reality television series Ang Bagong Kampeon and won. Her career began with a record deal with OctoArts International and the release of her single "Love Me Again" in 1986. After an appearance in the variety show The Penthouse Live!, she caught the attention of Ronnie Henares, a producer and talent manager who signed her to a management deal.

In May 2009, GMA Network announced a television special for the singer entitled Roots to Riches. It was the second birthday showcase on GMA by Velasquez, after The Best of Me in 2008. A blend of documentary and musical production, the title of the special is borrowed from the phrase rags-to-riches, a parallel of Velasquez's life and career trajectory. It depicted the singer's childhood beginnings as an amateur singer competing in various talent shows in her hometown of Bulacan through a series of biographical flashback re-enactments, camera footage, and a compilation of interviews. In it, key people that have been significant in her career were interviewed, including individuals that have supported her during the early years of competing in talent shows. "[It was] research[ed] ... I mean, everyone knows my story. But not this ... [a lot] of untold stories", Velasquez said about the special.

Roots to Riches featured performances from a concert filmed at the Centro Escolar University in Malolos, Bulacan, which aired on May 24, 2009. Guest musicians included Pilita Corrales, Jose Mari Chan, Dingdong Dantes, Pops Fernandez, and Dennis Trillo. Velasquez's former talent show rival Eva Castillo also made a special appearance. GMA partnered with Aria Productions to produce the program, with Mae Zambrano serving as executive producer. Louie Ignacio directed it, while Darling de Jesus was the supervising producer. Rommel Gacho served as the line producer, and Archie Riola was in charge of floor production. Bang Arespacochaga was associate producer and Wilma V. Galvante was in charge of the executive production. Raul Mitra was the musical director.

== Synopsis ==
The special begins with Velasquez narrating her early life and the inspiration behind her drive to compete in talents shows. It follows a series of flashback dramatizations of a young Velasquez as she leaves school on foot making her way to a street vendor selling memorabilia of singer-actress Sharon Cuneta, whom she idolizes. Unable to afford the item, she leaves despondent. It also featured interviews detailing her career beginnings from her former manager Ronnie Henares, sister and current manager Cacai, and her father Gerry. The documentary includes scenes of the singer revisiting her hometown of Bulacan to reunite with individuals that supported her when she was still competing. Among them are Susan Galvez, her grade school teacher who designed and sewed her dresses, and Ernesto Cuazon, a motorized tricycle owner who would drive Velasquez and her father between towns. In another scene, a reunion between Velasquez and her former talent show rival Eva Castillo takes place.

Velasquez performed eleven songs to an audience at the Centro Escolar University, including her Ang Bagong Kampeon piece "In Your Eyes", and her debut single "Love Me Again". She also performed several duet numbers with musicians she considered significant to her career journey, including Pops Fernandez who recommended she appear as a guest in The Penthouse Live!, where she was discovered by Henares, and Jose Mari Chan with whom Velasquez recorded her first collaboration "Please Be Careful with My Heart". Castillo made a special appearance and performed a medley of OPM songs with Velasquez.

== Set list ==
The set list is adapted from the special itself.

1. "Follow Your Road"
2. "Bakit Ako Mahihiya"
3. "Saan Ako Nagkamali" / "Ako ang Nasawi, Ako ang Nagwagi" (with Eva Castillo)
4. "In Your Eyes"
5. "Single Ladies (Put a Ring on It)" (with Pilita Corrales)
6. "Love Me Again"
7. "If I Were a Boy" (with Pops Fernandez)
8. "And I Am Telling You I'm Not Going"
9. "Please Be Careful with My Heart" (with Jose Mari Chan)
10. "Narito Ako"
11. "Lucky" (with Dingdong Dantes and Dennis Trillo)

== Personnel ==
Credits are adapted from the special itself.

Band members

- Regine Velasquez – lead vocals
- Raul Mitra – music director
- Rome Pacana – bass guitar
- Cesar Aguas – guitar
- Noel Mendez – guitar
- Sonny Matias – keyboard
- Ferdinand Faustino – drums
- Ulysses Avante – percussion
- Sylvia Macaraeg – backing vocals
- Rene Martinez – backing vocals
- Babsie Molina – backing vocals

Production

- Wilma V. Galvante – executive in charge of production
- Mae Zambrano – executive producer
- Darling de Jesus – supervising producer
- Bang Arespacochaga – associate producer
- Archie Riola – floor producer
- Rommel Gacho – line producer
- Louie Ignacio – stage and television director

== See also ==
- Regine Velasquez on screen and stage
