= After the Rain (TV special) =

2009 TV special by Regine Velasquez

- Title card
- Directed by: Louie Ignacio
- Starring: Regine Velasquez
- Country of origin: Philippines
- Original language: Tagalog

Production
- Executive producers: Wilma V. Galvante; Joseph Paolo Luciano
- Producers: Darling de Jesus; Paul Chia; MeAnn Regala
- Running time: 120 minutes

Original release
- Network: GMA
- Release: December 13, 2009

After the Rain: A Hopeful Christmas is a Christmas benefit concert television special by Filipino recording artist Regine Velasquez. It originally aired on December 13, 2009, in the Philippines on GMA Network. The charity event was organized by the GMA Kapuso Foundation to raise money, relief, and awareness in response to the loss of life and human suffering that resulted from Typhoon Ketsana (Ondoy). It was directed by Louie Ignacio and executive-produced by Wilma V. Galvante and Joseph Paolo Luciano. The special was performed to a live audience of more than 800 typhoon victims, who were also among the aid recipients.

The program was interspersed with various interviews that showcased stories of grief, heroism, and overcoming adversities following the natural disaster. These were accompanied by tribute numbers, which included popular holiday standards. After the Rain featured performances by guest musicians, including Pops Fernandez, Kuh Ledesma, Jaya, Kyla, Jay R, and La Diva. Various celebrities also appeared and made commentaries in the special.

== Background ==
In September 2009, Typhoon Ketsana (Ondoy) became the most devastating tropical cyclone to hit Manila. During the 2009 Pacific typhoon season, a state of calamity was declared by then-President Gloria Macapagal Arroyo, encompassing most of Luzon. Ondoy caused widespread flash flooding and power interruptions in the nearby cities and provinces. It resulted in 464 fatalities and caused infrastructure and agriculture damage estimated at ₱11 billion. Approximately 244 evacuation centers sheltered 70,124 people who had become displaced.

Initial plans for a Christmas benefit concert television special were announced by GMA Network on November 10, 2009, two months in the aftermath of Ondoy. Entitled After the Rain: A Hopeful Christmas, the two-hour musical documentary featured Regine Velasquez and aired on December 13, 2009; it was described as an "homage to the Filipino spirit that has remained resilient despite the seemingly unending odds". It featured performances to a live audience of more than 800 typhoon victims, who were treated to a dinner party before the event and later received aid packages. After the Rain was spliced with a series of interviews that showcased grief, heroism, and overcoming adversities after the typhoon struck. The singer collaborated with various musicians and special guests for the special. During a press conference for the program, Velasquez commented:

The purpose of this concert is to uplift their spirit a little bit. It's very important. Because right now, some people may think, the typhoon is already over, [it's been] how many months ... they still [need help] ... I think one of the reasons why GMA did this is, we wanted them to feel a little bit happy, and make them forget whatever problems they are going through.

GMA and its social program and outreach division, the GMA Kapuso Foundation, organized the production. Joseph Paolo Luciano served as executive producer, while Louie Ignacio directed it. Darling de Jesus was the supervising producer, with Paul Chia and MeAnn Regala as associate producers. Juel Balbon was in charge of floor production and Grace Toralde as head editor. Bang Arespacochaga was the program manager and Wilma V. Galvante was in charge of the executive production. Raul Mitra was chosen as the musical director. Guest performers included Pops Fernandez, Kuh Ledesma, Jaya, Kyla, Jay R, and La Diva. Various actors and other celebrities made commentaries, such as Dingdong Dantes, Richard Gutierrez, Marian Rivera, Mel Tiangco, and Mike Enriquez.

== Synopsis ==
The special featured three stories documented through a series of video presentations and interviews. The first, showcased a couple who carried on with their wedding plans amidst heavy rainfall and significant flooding. In the second feature, it focused on a father who lost his wife and kids as a result of drowning. The final story centers around the rescue of residents from an orphanage, the House of Refuge, which suffered heavy flooding due to levee breach.

Velasquez performed eleven production numbers, which included a collection of classic Christmas songs. She opened the program with a medley of "O Come, O Come, Emmanuel" and "Silent Night" backed by the University of the Philippines Concert Chorus. The featured stories were spliced with accompanying musical numbers where Velasquez was joined by guest performers. These numbers included Mariah Carey's "All I Want for Christmas Is You", which was mashed with the Wonder Girls's "Nobody", the show tune "Home" from the 1974 Broadway musical The Wiz, and Twila Paris's "The Warrior Is a Child". She also sang the Filipino holiday standards "Tuloy Na Tuloy Pa Rin Ang Pasko" and "Kumukutikutitap". "Natutulog Ba Ang Diyos?" was performed with Eva Castillo and Kyla, while Tyler Collins's "Thanks to You" was a duet number with Jay R. Velasquez and La Diva did a rendition of Barry Manilow's "I Made It Through the Rain". The show closed with a performance of the gospel song "Light of a Million Mornings".

== Set list ==
Set list adapted from the special itself.

1. "O Come, O Come, Emmanuel" / "Silent Night"
2. "All I Want for Christmas Is You" / "Nobody"
3. "Home"
4. "The Warrior Is a Child"
5. "Tuloy Na Tuloy Pa Rin Ang Pasko"
6. "Kumukutikutitap"
7. "Natutulog Ba Ang Diyos?"
8. "Thanks to You"
9. "I Made It Through the Rain"
10. "Light of a Million Mornings"

== Personnel ==
Credits adapted from the special itself.

Band members

- Regine Velasquez – lead vocals
- Raul Mitra – music director
- Wilson Matias – keyboards
- Michael Alba – bass guitar
- Cesar Aguas – guitar
- Romeo Pacana – guitar
- Dix Lucero – drums
- Miriam Marquez – background vocalist
- Anthony Cailao – background vocalist
- Mary Rose Borlaza – background vocalist
- University of the Philippines Concert Chorus

Production

- Wilma V. Galvante – executive in charge of production
- Joseph Paolo Luciano – executive producer
- Darling de Jesus – supervising producer
- MeAnn Regala – associate producer
- Paul Chia – associate producer
- Bang Arespacochaga – program manager
- Juel Balbon – floor producer
- Rannel David – line producer
- Louie Ignacio – television director
- Grace Toralde – editor

Guest appearances

- Ogie Alcasid
- Eva Castillo
- Dingdong Dantes
- Kris Angelica Dela Cruz
- Mike Enriquez
- Frencheska Farr
- Pops Fernandez
- Mae Flores
- Richard Gutierrez
- Jay R
- Jaya
- Kiddiewockees
- Kyla
- La Diva
- Maureen Larrazabal
- Kuh Ledesma
- Moymoy Palaboy
- Yassi Pressman
- Rufa Mae Quinto
- Marian Rivera
- Julie Anne San Jose
- Jude Matthew Sevilla
- Mel Tiangco
- Michael V.
- Shane Velasco

== See also ==
- Regine Velasquez on screen and stage
