= After the Rain =

After the Rain may refer to:

== Film and television ==
- After the Rain (film), a 1999 Japanese-French film directed by Takashi Koizumi
- After the Rain (TV series), a 2000–2002 Iranian series
- After the Rain (TV special), a 2009 Philippine Christmas special by Regine Velasquez
- "After the Rain" (Amphibia), a 2021 TV episode
- "After the Rain" (Bridgerton), a 2020 TV episode

== Literature ==
- After the Rain (manga), a 2014–2018 manga series by Jun Mayuzuki
- After the Rain, a 1958 novel by John Bowen
- After the Rain (play), a 1966 play by Bowen based on his novel
- After the Rain, a 1987 children's novel by Norma Fox Mazer

== Music ==
- After the Rain (ballet), a 2005 ballet by Christopher Wheeldon to music by Arvo Pärt
- After the Rain (duo), a Japanese male musical group

=== Albums ===
- After the Rain (Aaron & Amanda Crabb album) or the title song, 2007
- After the Rain (Bellefire album), 2001
- After the Rain (Irma Thomas album), 2006
- After the Rain (John McLaughlin album), 1994
- After the Rain (Muddy Waters album), 1969
- After the Rain (Nelson album) or the title song (see below), 1990
- After the Rain (Side Effect album), 1980
- After the Rain (Terje Rypdal album) or the title song, 1976
- After the Rain, by Benjamin Francis Leftwich, 2016
- After the Rain, by Michael Jones, 1988
- After the Rain, by Michel Legrand, 1983
- After the Rain, by the Underachievers, 2018
- After the Rain, an EP by Baby Tate, 2020

=== Songs ===
- "After the Rain" (Ai song), 2004
- "After the Rain" (The Angels song), 1978
- "After the Rain" (Nelson song), 1990
- "After the Rain" (Nickelback song), 2017
- "After the Rain", by Blue Rodeo from Casino, 1990
- "After the Rain", by Bruce Cockburn from Dancing in the Dragon's Jaws, 1979
- "After the Rain", by the Comsat Angels from Fiction, 1982
- "After the Rain", by John Coltrane from Impressions, 1963
- "After the Rain", by Mya from Moodring, 2003
- "After the Rain", by Titiyo, 1989
