= R2K: The TV Special =

2000 TV special by Regine Velasquez

- Title card
- Directed by: Louie Ignacio
- Starring: Regine Velasquez
- Country of origin: Philippines
- Original language: Filipino

Production
- Executive producer: Vic del Rosario
- Producers: Rene Salta; Edie Esguerra; Bambi Diploma; Jerome Marasigan
- Running time: 120 minutes

Original release
- Network: Viva TV
- Release: January 2, 2000

R2K: The TV Special is a concert television special by Filipino recording artist Regine Velasquez. Concurrent to the release of the singer's tenth studio album R2K, it originally aired on January 2, 2000, in the Philippines on Viva TV. It featured live performances of songs from the cover album, and included a behind-the-scenes footage detailing the process of filming the music videos issued in the bonus Video CD (VCD) of the record. The two-hour special is spliced with a compilation of interviews from celebrities, musicians, and crew members involved with the production of the album and music videos.

Principal photography took place at the Nayong Pilipino Cultural Park in Pasay City. In it, Velasquez premiered the unreleased music videos for the tracks "MacArthur Park" and "Music of Goodbye". She also performed a stripped down and acoustic rendition of "The Lord's Prayer". Guest stars included Ogie Alcasid, Janno Gibbs, Dingdong Dantes, Julio Diaz, KC Montero, and Antoinette Taus. It was executive produced by Vic del Rosario and directed by Louie Ignacio. The show was released to the public as a VHS titled R2K: The Millennium Special.

== Background ==
Regine Velasquez released her tenth studio album R2K on November 27, 1999, under Viva Records. It contains remakes of pop music from the 1970s and 1980s, and was issued with a bonus Video CD (VCD) of five music videos for its tracks, including Jeffrey Osborne's "On the Wings of Love", the Carpenters's "One Love", Bread's "Lost Without Your Love", George Benson's "In Your Eyes", and the Isley Brothers's "For the Love of You". The singer became the first Filipino artist to release an album with an accompanying VCD and a 48-page magazine. As part of the album's promotion, Velasquez performed in small venues, which included a three-day event at the Music Museum called Regine 2000.

To coincide with the release of the album, Viva organized a concert television special that was filmed at Nayong Pilipino Cultural Park in Pasay. The show was originally broadcast via the record label's channel Viva TV to help promote the album. (Note: R2K: The TV Special was aired on the Sunday night programming block, Sinemaks, of Viva TV (formerly IBC-13) on January 2, 2000.) The special included behind-the-scenes footage that detailed the production and filming of the singer's music videos and photo shoots. It showed rehearsals and preparations for the special. In it, Velasquez revealed how she conceptualized the album and the process behind the selection of songs that were included in the final cut. The program was interspersed with interviews, including with Janno Gibbs, who provided background vocals to the track "One Love", as well as Dingdong Dantes and Antoinette Taus, both of whom appeared in the single's music video. It also previewed behind-the-scenes material on the set of the accompanying music video for "Music of Goodbye", with a special appearance by actor Julio Diaz.

The special was produced by Viva, with Vic del Rosario serving as executive producer. Louie Ignacio directed it, and was also the line producer. Perry Lansigan was in charge of the executive production and Jun Gonzalez was the director of photography. Rene Salta led a team of supervising producers, while Michael Revilla was the head editor. Viva released a recording of the show in VHS, entitled R2K: The Millennium Special, that year.

== Synopsis ==
The special opened with Velasquez welcoming her viewers to the first Sunday night of the new millennium. She briefly talked about conceptualizing her album R2K or sometimes called Regine 2000, with the title borrowed from the numeronym Y2K. At that point, it transitioned to the music video premiere of the track "MacArthur Park". In the video, she is joined by KC Montero who incorporated a rap routine. Velasquez's live performances were filmed at the Vigan House of the Nayong Pilipino Cultural Park. It featured a number of musicians and back-up vocalists set up in the second storey of the house laid out with numerous floor lights and rustic decor. She performed six songs, which was introduced as R2K Unplugged.

Velasquez made her entrance wearing a black gown barefoot and joined her band. The show began with the song "Music & Me", a 1973 Motown hit by Michael Jackson. Next on the set list was the Richard Kerr-penned "I'll Never Love This Way Again", from Dionne Warwick's 1979 release, which the singer sang while seated by the window. As Velasquez introduced the following song, ABBA's "Dancing Queen", she said "there's only one title I dream of being called", beginning the performance shortly after. She then began Neil Diamond's 1980 soundtrack theme "Hello Again". The final song was a ballad arrangement of Aerosmith's 1998 single "I Don't Wanna Miss a Thing". After the number concluded, Velasquez bids the viewers goodbye and ended the show singing the last verses of "On the Wings of Love", before exiting. A special performance of "The Lord's Prayer" was recorded in the theme park's lake to close the special.

== Set list ==
Set list adapted from the special itself.

1. "Music & Me"
2. "I'll Never Love This Way Again"
3. "Dancing Queen"
4. "Hello Again"
5. "I Don't Wanna Miss a Thing"
6. "On the Wings of Love"

Encore

7. "The Lord's Prayer"

== Personnel ==
Credits adapted from the special itself.

Band members

- Regine Velasquez – lead vocals
- Rey Cristobal – musical director, keyboards
- Raul Mitra – keyboards
- Noel Mendez – guitars
- Sonny Azurin – bass
- Jun Regalado – drums
- Maxie Goloy – background vocalist
- Elise Cortez – background vocalist
- Anna Inocencio – background vocalist

Production

- Perry Lansigan – executive in charge of production
- Vic del Rosario – executive producer
- Rene Salta – supervising producer
- Edie Esguerra – supervising producer
- Bambi Diploma – supervising producer
- Jerome Marasigan – supervising producer
- Patty Mayoralgo – associate producer
- Hazel Abonita – associate producer
- GB Sampedro – associate producer
- Michael Revilla – supervising editor
- Jun Gonzalez – cinematographer
- Louie Ignacio – television director, line producer

Guest appearances

- Ogie Alcasid
- Ariel Atendido
- Gabby Eigenmann
- Janno Gibbs
- Dingdong Dantes
- Julio Diaz
- KC Montero
- Jet Rai
- Antoinette Taus

== See also ==
- R2K: The Concert
- Regine Velasquez on screen and stage
