= Songbird (TV program) =

2008 musical show by Regine Velasquez

- Title card
- Genre: Musical show
- Directed by: Louie Ignacio
- Presented by: Regine Velasquez
- Opening theme: "Songbird"
- Country of origin: Philippines
- Original language: Tagalog
- No. of episodes: 13

Production
- Executive producers: Wilma V. Galvante; Perry Lansigan
- Production locations: Metro Manila, Philippines
- Camera setup: Multiple-camera setup
- Running time: 45 minutes
- Production company: GMA Entertainment TV

Original release
- Network: GMA Network
- Release: May 15 – August 9, 2008

Songbird is a late-night musical show presented by singer Regine Velasquez in the Philippines. Directed by Louie Ignacio, it premiered on GMA Network on May 15, 2008. The series concluded on August 9, 2008, with a total of 13 episodes. Each episode has a musical theme at its core which ranges from artist tributes to songs taken from various genres and styles of music. The program featured solo performances rendered by Velasquez, in front of a live audience, as well as select duets with guest performers. The production numbers were based on the episode's concept of the week. Many of the songs covered on the show were often selected from the catalog of contemporary musical acts.

The pilot episode featured songs of American singer Barbra Streisand, and subsequent episodes showcased tributes to artists such as Michael Jackson, Barry Manilow, and the Beatles. The music of Filipino singers such as Gary Valenciano, Zsa Zsa Padilla, and Basil Valdez have also been featured, with each of them appearing as guests. Soundtracks of films and television series have been a recurring theme, performed in three episodes. The stage design was set up with a large LED screen backdrop and a grand staircase. During the show's run, it first aired on Thursday nights, before moving to Saturday nights on its third episode until its conclusion.

== Background ==
In April 2008, The Philippine Star reported that after the broadcast of her television concert special The Best of Me on April 27, Regine Velasquez will then headline a musical show which would commence production the following month. Titled Songbird, the program was conceived as a weekly late-night "musical extravaganza" which would feature performances from Velasquez and various special guests. The show's name is borrowed from her honorific nickname "Asia's Songbird". She stated that when the prospect of doing a "straight musical" show was presented to her, she wanted the focal point of the program to be musically "thematic" as opposed to having elements of a variety show.

In a typical episode, the show features the music of a contemporary artist, the work of a songwriter, or a particular genre and style of music. Velasquez described the concept: "Every week, there's a different theme, we feature different artists, songwriters, genre; we even do movie themes. So every week is different. We also have different guests for each week depending on what theme". The episodes run for about 45 minutes with at least seven to eight cover songs performed, including medley productions that are 5 minutes long. Different guest performers are invited each week and sing duets with Velasquez. She further added that she aimed to maintain a balance between signature songs and obscure lesser-known material when preparing for each show's set list.

Velasquez recorded a cover of Barbra Streisand's 1978 single "Songbird" for the show's opening theme. The stage design featured a large LED screen as a backdrop and a grand staircase connected to the main stage. Perry Lansigan served as the executive producer. Louie Ignacio directed it, while Darling de Jesus was the supervising producer. Jaime Mejia served as the lighting director, and Paul Chia and Archie Riola were in charge of floor production. Bang Arespacochaga was the senior program manager and Wilma V. Galvante was in charge of the executive production. Raul Mitra was the show's musical director.

== Episodes ==
No.	Title	Guest(s)	Original release date (Note: The first two episodes aired on Thursday nights. For its third episode, the show moved to Saturday nights and remained there until its finale.)	AGB Nielsen ratings
1	"The Music of Barbra Streisand"	Dennis Trillo, Gian Magdangal	May 15, 2008	11.9%
Performed songs: "The Way We Were", "Guilty", "What Kind of Fool", "Somewhere", "No Matter What Happens", "Evergreen"
2	"The Music of Michael Jackson"	Michael V.	May 22, 2008	13.1%
Performed song(s): "Ben", "Someone in the Dark", "One Day in Your Life", "Rock with You", "Beat It", "I Just Can't Stop Loving You", "Black or White", "She's Out of My Life"
3	"The Music of Madonna"	Jolina Magdangal, Rochelle Pangilinan, Jopay	May 31, 2008	16.1%
Performed song(s): "Music", "Crazy for You", "Live to Tell", "Papa Don't Preach", "Like a Virgin", "Take a Bow", "La Isla Bonita"
4	"Filipino Oldies"	Dingdong Dantes	June 7, 2008	—
Performed song(s): "Don't Know What to Do", "I Will Always Stay This Way in Love with You", "Tell Me", "Harana", "Ang Daigdig Ko'y Ikaw", "Wherever You Are", "Ikaw ang Lahat sa Akin"
5	"Movie Theme Songs"	Richard Gomez	June 14, 2008	10.6%
Performed song(s): "Ain't No Mountain High Enough", "Only Hope", "My Heart Will Go On", "(I've Had) The Time of My Life", "When You Say Nothing at All", "Way Back in to Love", "I Will Always Love You", "Run to You", "I Have Nothing"
6	"The Music of Barry Manilow"	La Diva	June 21, 2008	8.6%
Performed song(s): "Can't Smile Without You", "Ready to Take a Chance Again", "Could It Be Magic", "If I Should Love Again", "This One's for You", "Somewhere Down the Road"
7	"The Music of Basil Valdez and Zsa Zsa Padilla"	Basil Valdez, Zsa Zsa Padilla	June 28, 2008	11.3%
Performed song(s): "Hiram", "Point of No Return", "Kailangan Mo, Kailangan Ko", "Gaano Kadalas ang Minsan", "Paraisong Parisukat", "Ngayon"
8	"Teleserye Themes Songs"	Kyla, Jay R, Mark Anthony Fernandez, Wendell Ramos	July 5, 2008	13.8%
Performed song(s): "Marimar", "Go the Distance", "Sinasamba Kita", "Pag-ibig Ko'y Pansinin", "Mahawi Man ang Ulap", "Maybe It's You"
9	"Original Pilipino Music"	Kuh Ledesma, Ogie Alcasid, Jinky Vidal	July 12, 2008	10.1%
Performed song(s): "Nais Ko", "Kung Sakali", "Ikaw Lang ang Mamahalin", "Kailangan Kita", "Sa Kanya", "Bato sa Buhangin"
10	"Filipino Jukebox"	Eva Eugenio, Claire dela Fuente, Dulce	July 19, 2008	20.2%
Performed song(s): "Saan Ako Nagkamali", "Tukso", "Isang Linggong Pag-ibig", "Ako ang Nagwagi", "Sayang", "Bakit Ako Mahihiya"
11	"The Music of the Beatles"	Janno Gibbs	July 26, 2008	8.1%
Performed song(s): "Blackbird", "Eleanor Rigby", "Yesterday", "If I Fell", "In My Life", "Help!", "All My Loving"
12	"Telefantasya Theme Songs"	Kitchie Nadal, Julie Anne San Jose	August 2, 2008	—
Performed song(s): "Majika", "Siya Na Nga Kaya", "Ang Aking Mundo", "Di Na Nag-iisa", "Mahiwagang Puso"
13	"The Music of Gary Valenciano"	Gary Valenciano, Jaya	August 9, 2008	8.4%
Performed song(s): "Sana Maulit Muli", "In Another Lifetime", "Muli", "Di Na Natuto", "Only Hope", "Shout for Joy"

== Broadcast ==
Songbird debuted on GMA Network on May 15, 2008, as a replacement for the drama series E.S.P. for its 11:00 pm Thursday late-night slot. After airing two episodes, the show moved to Saturday nights on May 31, and remained there until its final episode on August 9. By the end of its run, Songbird had aired a total of 13 episodes.

== Personnel ==
Credits are adapted from the television show itself.

Band members

- Regine Velasquez – lead vocals and presenter
- Raul Mitra – music director
- Bobby Rasco – bass guitar
- Noel Mendez – guitar
- Bond Samson – keyboard
- Michael Alba – drums
- Marisse Borlaza – backing vocals
- Tanya Marquez – backing vocals
- Anthony Cailao – backing vocals

Production

- Wilma V. Galvante – executive in charge of production
- Perry Lansigan – executive producer
- Darling de Jesus – supervising producer
- Lui Cadag – associate producer
- Bang Arespacochaga – senior program manager
- Paul Chia – floor producer
- Archie Riola – floor producer
- Jaime Mejia – lighting director
- Agnes Caballa – head writer
- Louie Ignacio – stage and television director
- Noel Ubico – assistant director
