= The Best of Me (TV special) =

2008 TV special by Regine Velasquez

- Title card
- Directed by: Louie Ignacio
- Starring: Regine Velasquez
- Country of origin: Philippines
- Original language: Tagalog

Production
- Executive producers: Wilma V. Galvante; Perry Lansigan
- Producers: Paul Chia; Cathy Soriano; Edlyn Abuel
- Editor: Edward Alegre
- Running time: 120 minutes
- Production company: Aria Productions

Original release
- Network: GMA Network
- Release: April 27, 2008

The Best of Me is a concert television special by Filipino singer Regine Velasquez. It originally aired on April 27, 2008, in the Philippines on GMA Network. A celebration of Velasquez's 38th birthday, the program consisted of solo performances and select duets. Filmed at Velasquez's Ayala Hillside Estates residence in Quezon City, the two-hour special was directed by Louie Ignacio, while Raul Mitra served as the music director. The program featured guest stars Ogie Alcasid, Jay R, and Kyla, and a special performance with the singer's parents.

The stage was set up on the infinity pool, with musicians, background vocalists and a string section. Velasquez performed a selection of cover songs from rock bands, such as the Eagles and U2, as well as music from Colbie Caillat, David Foster, Josh Groban, and Kenny Loggins. In it, she also premiered the soundtrack of the animated film Urduja (2008), for which she voiced the eponymous title character.

== Background ==
In April 2008, a two-hour television special entitled The Best of Me was conceived to celebrate Filipino recording artist Regine Velasquez's 38th birthday. The singer stated that when the idea of a birthday special was presented to her, she wanted the show to be a complete 180 from her usual repertoire. Also, she did not want it to be the typical concert showcase. The special was described in a press release as "a totally different facet of Asia's Songbird", which would feature songs the singer has been "itching to perform onstage but never really got a chance because it is not what the audience expects". According to The Philippine Star, Velasquez will perform an Italian song titled "Per te" and the Academy Award-winning indie folk song "Falling Slowly". A promotional tie-in with the special was the premiere performance of the movie theme "Babae", from the animated film Urduja (2008), for which the eponymous title character was voiced by Velasquez.

Principal photography took place at Velasquez's Ayala Hillside Estates residence in Quezon City, which was completed in November 2007. During an interview with the Philippine Entertainment Portal, she shared that her production team had challenges finding a concert venue, so she took inspiration from Barbra Streisand's benefit concert special One Voice, which was filmed at Streisand's Malibu home. When asked about the concept and design for the show, Velasquez revealed that she suggested having the stage set up by the infinity pool for the performances. She added that the special was filmed to coincide at twilight.

A lot of people have been asking me to feature the house. I didn't agree with the idea then because I wanted to keep a little bit of privacy but when I learned it's hard to book the show in the hotel, I thought it would be best to do it in the house.

GMA Network partnered with Velasquez to premiere the program. It was produced by Aria Productions, with Perry Lansigan serving as executive producer. Louie Ignacio directed it, while Darling de Jesus was the supervising producer. Rannel David served as the line producer, and Archie Riola was in charge of floor production. Juel Balbon was co-executive producer and Wilma V. Galvante was in charge of the executive production. Raul Mitra was chosen as the music director. Guest performers included Ogie Alcasid, Jay R, and Kyla. The Best of Me was aired on April 27, 2008, in the Philippines on GMA.

== Synopsis ==
The show began with Velasquez, perched at the balcony of her three storey residence wearing a silk dress and jeans, singing the first few verses of David Foster's "The Best of Me". She then headed down the stairs towards the plexiglass stage set up on the infinity pool. At the stage, she begins performing Kenny Loggins's "Conviction of the Heart", accompanied by musicians, background vocalists. and a string section. She followed this with a rendition of Colbie Caillat's "Bubbly", before transitioning to a medley of songs popularized by singer-songwriter Clair Marlo.

The next segment saw Velasquez changing outfits into a red gown, and beginning a performance of the Eagles's "Hotel California". She later moved into the edge of the pool to perform Josh Groban's Italian single "Per te". At this point, she briefly spoke about the animated film Urduja (2008) before she began singing its theme "Babae". Jay R and Kyla then joined her for a performance of Loggins's "This Is It". After the number, she sang her 1990 single "Hindi Na, Ayoko Na" and was then joined by her parents for a surprise number of Al Martino's "You'll Never Know (Just How Much I Love You)", which marked her first live performance with them.

The third segment started with Velasquez introducing each member of her band and vocalists, and continued with Loggins's "Footloose". Shortly after, Ogie Alcasid made his way to the stage for a duet number of "Falling Slowly". For the final act, Velasquez donned a green dress and began with the Motown hit "Got to Be There". She then goes straight into a full performance of the opening song, "The Best of Me", with brief a fireworks display. Velasquez closed the special with a performance of U2's "Pride (In the Name of Love)", as she dove into the pool after the number ended.

== Set list ==
Set list adapted from the special itself.

1. "Conviction of the Heart"
2. "Bubbly"
3. "'Til They Take My Heart Away" / "Without Me" / "I Believe (When I Fall in Love It Will Be Forever)" / "Do You Love Me?"
4. "Hotel California"
5. "Per te"
6. "Babae"
7. "This Is It" (with Jay R and Kyla)
8. "Hindi Na, Ayoko Na"
9. "You'll Never Know (Just How Much I Love You)"
10. "Footloose"
11. "Falling Slowly" (with Ogie Alcasid)
12. "Got to Be There"
13. "The Best of Me"
14. "Pride (In the Name of Love)"

== Personnel ==
Credits adapted from the special itself.

Band members

- Regine Velasquez – lead vocals
- Raul Mitra – music director
- Romeo Pacana – bass guitar
- Cesar Aguas – guitar
- Noel Mendez – guitar
- Sonny Matias – keyboard
- Ferdinand Faustino – drums
- Ulysses Avante – percussion
- Eugen Gallo – backing vocals
- Marrise Abrilla – backing vocals
- Tanya Marquez – backing vocals
- Babsie Molina – backing vocals
- Sylvia Macaraeg – backing vocals
- Rene Martinez – backing vocals
- Antonio Bautista – string section
- Regine Imperial – string section
- Antonio Baustisa – string section
- Rogelio Santos – string section
- Ruben Bautista – string section
- Sulpicio Garcia – string section
- Niño Llorin – string section
- Cecilia Noble – string section
- Marlo Reyes – string section

Production

- Wilma V. Galvante – executive in charge of production
- Perry Lansigan – executive producer
- Juel Balbon – co-executive producer
- Darling de Jesus – supervising producer
- Edlyn Abuel – associate producer
- Paul Chia – associate producer
- Cathy Soriano – associate producer
- Archie Riola – floor producer
- Rannel David – line producer
- Louie Ignacio – television director
- Edward Alegre – editor

== See also ==
- Regine Velasquez on screen and stage
