= Buhawi Jack =

Philippine fantasy drama television series

- Genre: Fantasy drama Action; Adventure
- Based on: Buhawi Jack by Rod Santiago
- Developed by: Liwayway Komiks
- Directed by: Dondon Santos
- Starring: Gerald Anderson; Jewel Mische; Bugoy Cariño; Rap Fernandez
- Opening theme: "Walang Wakas" by Sponge Cola
- Country of origin: Philippines
- Original language: Filipino
- No. of episodes: 10

Production
- Executive producer: Brenda Lee E. Estocapio
- Production locations: Metro Manila; Pampanga
- Running time: 60 minutes
- Production company: Dreamscape Entertainment Television

Original release
- Network: ABS-CBN
- Release: January 22 – March 26, 2011

Wansapanataym Presents: Buhawi Jack (lit. Tornado Jack) is a Philippine fantasy drama television series based on the comic strip of the same name by Rod Santiago, and was aired on ABS-CBN. It is part of the fantasy anthology series Wansapanataym, and the series' first fantaserye.

== Cast and characters ==
=== Main cast ===
- Gerald Anderson as Buhawi Jack/Jack Isidro
- Jewel Mische as Vera Miranda
- Bugoy Cariño as Dino Isidro
- Rap Fernandez as Rex Vergara

=== Supporting cast ===
- Phillip Salvador as Jaime Isidro
- Joel Torre as Manuel Miranda
- Yayo Aguila as Josie Isidro
- Tetchie Agbayani as Mildred Vergara/Ferenze Escaño
- Ricardo Cepeda as Roger Vergara
- Julio Diaz as Mang Impe
- Andre Tiangco as Arturo

== See also ==
- List of programs aired by ABS-CBN
- Wansapanataym
