= Julio Diaz (actor) =

Filipino actor

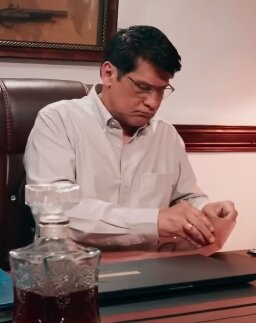
- Diaz in FPJ’s Batang Quiapo
- Born: Mariano Calongje de Leon; November 18, 1959 (age 66); Manila, Philippines
- Other names: Mariano de Leon Regaliza; Julio Diaz
- Occupation: Actor
- Years active: 1984–present

Mariano Calongje de Leon (Born on November 18, 1959), better known by his stage name Julio Diaz, is a Filipino film and television actor in the Philippines. Diaz is of Filipino Mexican background. He received the Best Actor Gawad Urian Award nomination for his performance in Takaw Tukso (1986).

== Career ==
Julio Diaz's stage name was inspired by the main character of the 1975 film Manila in the Claws of Light, Julio Madiaga (played by Bembol Roco).

Diaz did movies such as Sinner or Saint (1984) with Claudia Zobel, Paano Tatakasan ang Bukas? (1988) with Dina Bonnevie, Kailan Ka Magiging Akin (1991) with Janice de Belen, Aliwan Paradise (1992), Bayani (1992), Sakay (1993) with Tetchie Agbayani, The Flor Contemplacion Story (1995) with Nora Aunor, Segurista (1996) with Michelle Aldana, Sana Pag-ibig Na (1998) with Angel Aquino, Hubad Sa Ilalim Ng Buwan (2000) with Klaudia Koronel, Balahibong Pusa (2001) with Rica Peralejo, and Lapu-Lapu (2002) with Lito Lapid.

He also appeared in films like Batanes (2007) with Iza Calzado, Serbis (2008) with Gina Pareño, Kinatay (2009) with Coco Martin, Biyaheng Lupa (2009) with Jacklyn Jose, and 24K (2009).

== Awards and nominations ==
Year	Award	Category	Film	Result
1987	Gawad Urian Award	Best Actor	Takaw Tukso	Nominated
1993	Gawad Urian Award	Best Actor	Bayani	Nominated
1993	FAMAS Award	Best Actor	Bayani	Nominated
1994	FAMAS Award	Best Actor	Sakay	Nominated
2009	Gawad Urian Award	Best Supporting Actor	Service	Nominated
2010	YCC Award	Best Male Performance	Soliloquy	Nominated
2011	Gawad Urian Award	Best Supporting Actor	Blood Ties	Nominated

== Filmography ==
=== Film ===
Year	Title	Role	Notes
1984	Sinner or Saint		
1984	Sariwa		
1985	Sex Object		
1986	Flesh Avenue		
1987	Kamagong	Emilio Salgado	
1987	Anak ng Lupa	Jim	
1987	Hubad Na Pangarap		
1988	Kapag Napagod ang Puso		
1988	Paano Tatakasan ang Bukas?		
1988	I Love You 3x a Day	Raymond	
1989	3 Mukha ng Pag-ibig	Abel	"Ang Silid" segment
1989	Eagle Squad	Jun Domingo	
1989	Kung Kasalanan Man	Alvaro	
1990	Kasalanan Bang Sambahin Ka?	Alex Katigbak	
1990	Kolehiyala		
1990	Walang Awa Kung Pumatay		
1990	Lumaban Ka Sagot Kita sa Diyos!		
1991	Kailan Ka Magiging Akin	Ben	
1992	Bayani		
1993	Sakay	Macario Sakay	
1994	Trudis Liit		
1995	The Flor Contemplacion Story	Efren Contemplacion	
1996	Dyesebel	Tino	
1996	Gayuma		
1996	Dead Sure	Eddie	
1997	Tirad Pass: The Last Stand of Gen. Gregorio del Pilar		
1997	Kamandag Ko ang Papatay sa Iyo		
1998	Wangbu	Lt. Rapacio	
1998	Mapusok		
1998	Sana Pag-ibig Na		
1999	Misteryosa		
1999	Pamasak Butas		
1999	Gatilyo		
1999	Hubad sa Ilalim ng Buwan		
2000	Masarap Habang Mainit		
2000	Pedrong Palad		
2001	Ika-Pitong Gloria		
2001	Virgin Wife		
2002	Kaulayaw		
2002	Lapu-Lapu	Radeen	
2003	Bangkero		
2004	Anak Ka ng Tatay Mo		
2005	Lovestruck		
2007	Tirador	Diego	
2007	Batanes: Sa Dulo Ng Walang Hanggan	Fred	
2008	Ang Lihim ni Kurdapya		
2008	Service	Lando	
2009	Tulak		
2009	Kinatay	Vic/Kap	
2009	Kamoteng Kahoy		
2009	24K		
2009	Soliloquy		
2009	Nandito Ako Nagmamahal Sa'Yo	Eddie Lozano	
2010	Blood Ties		
2010	Vox Populi		
2010	Halik sa Tubig		
2012	Ang Misis ni Meyor		
2012	Pikit-mata		
2013	I Luv U, Pare Ko		
2014	Maratabat: Pride and Honor	Governor Salvador Abubakar	
2015	Trap	Larry	
2015	Bambanti	Daniel	
2016	Ma' Rosa	Nestor Reyes	
2016	Tiniente Gimo		
2017	Ang Panday	Primo	
2023	Apag		
2024	Mamay: A Journey to Greatness		

=== Television series ===
Year	Title	Role	Notes	Source
1988	Hello, Uncle Sam?			
1993	Ipaglaban Mo!	Atty. Ruben Felix	Episode: "Dangal ng Propesyon"	
1996–1997	Familia Zaragoza	Lorenzo Lagrimas		
1996–1998	Calvento Files	Various	3 episodes	
2000	R2K: The TV Special	Himself	Television special	
2011	Buhawi Jack	Mang Impe		
2015–2018	FPJ's Ang Probinsyano	Julian Valerio	Extended cast / anti-hero	
2017	Stories for the Soul	Henry	Episode: "Santa Makasalanan"	
2018	Ipaglaban Mo	Mario	Episode: "Disgrasyada"	
2018	Asintado	Melchor Gonzales / Manuel de Dios	Supporting cast / anti-hero	
2023–2025	FPJ's Batang Quiapo	Major General Augustus V. Pacheco†	Main cast / Antagonist	
2026	Sigabo	Dante Aguilar		

=== Television shows ===
- 2015 Juan Tamad
- 2015 Dangwa
- 2015 Nathaniel
- 2015 Sabado Badoo
- 2015 Pasion De Amor
- 2015 Inday Bote
- 2015 Karelasyon
- 2015 Marimar
- 2015 Pare Ko'y
- 2015 Kailan Ba Tama ang Mali?
- 2014 Wattpad Presents
- 2014 Magpakailanman
- 2014 Carmela
- 2014 The Half Sisters
- 2014 Illustrado
- 2014 Innamorata
- 2013 Wagas
- 2013 Katipunan
- 2013 Bingit
- 2013 It's Showtime: Holy Week Drama Specials
- 2012-2013 Pahiram ng Sandali
- 2012 Toda Max
- 2011-2012 Munting Heredera
- 2011-2012 Real Confessions
- 2012 Maalaala Mo Kaya - Sumpak
- 2011 Maalaala Mo Kaya - Itak
- 2011 Spooky Nights Presents
- 2011 Buhawi Jack
- 2011 Babaeng Hampaslupa
- 2010 Wansapanataym
- 2010 Ang Yaman ni Lola
- 2010 Gumapang Ka sa Lusak
- 2010 Pilyang Kerubin
- 2010 Agimat: Mga Alamat ni Ramon Revilla Presents: Elias Paniki
- 2010 Maalaala Mo Kaya - Pera
- 2009 Precious Hearts Romance
- 2009 Agimat: Mga Alamat ni Ramon Revilla Presents: Tianong Akyat
- 2009 Maalaala Mo Kaya - Sulo
- 2009 Dapat Ka Bang Mahalin?
- 2008 Camera Cafe on GMA
- 2008 Magpakailanman
- 2008 Komiks Presents: Kapitan Boom
- 2006 Your Song
- 2006 Baywalk TV Series
- 2005 Noel
- 2004 Forever in My Heart
- 2004 Walang Bakas (documentary)
- 2003 Home Along da Airport
- 2002 Pangako ng Lupa (TV movie)
- 2001 Idol Ko si Kap
- 2001 Eto Na ang Susunod Na Kabanata
- 2000 Super Klenk
- 2000 Maynila
- 2000 CBN Asia Holy Week Drama Special
- 1999-2001 Rio Del Mar
- 1999 Mikee Forever
- 1999 Di Ba't Ikaw
- 1998 MTB Lenten Drama Specials
- 1998 Katapat: Mayor Fred Lim
- 1998 Paraiso
- 1997-1998 Ikaw Na Sana
- 1997 FLAMES
- 1997 The Calvento Files
- 1996 Mga Liham ni Alberto (TV movie)
- 1996 1896 (ABC5)
- 1995 Spotlight Drama Special
- 1995 Mikee
- 1995 GMA Telesine Specials
- 1995 Bayani - Andrés Bonifacio
- 1994 Toynk!: Hulog ng Langit
- 1994 Noli Me Tángere (ABC5)
- 1993 Home Along Da Riles
- 1993 Rated Pang Bayan: Pugad Baboy Sa TV
- 1993 Bisperas ng Kasaysayan
- 1993 Davao: Ang Gintong Pag-Asa
- 1992 Kapag May Katriwan: Ipaglaban Mo!
- 1991 Cebu
- 1990 The Maricel Drama Special
- 1990 Boracay
- 1989 Stowaway
- 1989 Estudyante Blues TV Series
- 1988 Eat Bulaga Holy Week Drama Specials
- 1987 Salot: "Sindak"
- 1987 Goin Bananas
- 1985 Champoy
- 1985 Lovingly Yours
- 1985 Regal Shockers
- 1984 Batibot
