= Diva (TV series) =

2010 Philippine television drama series

- Title card
- Genre: Comedy drama; Musical
- Developed by: Don Michael Perez
- Directed by: Dominic Zapata
- Starring: Regine Velasquez
- Theme music composer: Ogie Alcasid
- Opening theme: "Diva" by the cast of Diva
- Ending theme: "Walang Iba" by Regine Velasquez
- Country of origin: Philippines
- Original language: Tagalog
- No. of episodes: 107

Production
- Executive producer: Camille Gomba-Montaño
- Camera setup: Multiple-camera setup
- Running time: 30–45 minutes
- Production company: GMA Entertainment TV

Original release
- Network: GMA Network
- Release: March 1 – July 30, 2010

Diva is a 2010 Philippine television drama comedy musical series broadcast by GMA Network. Directed by Dominic Zapata, it stars Regine Velasquez in the title role. It premiered on March 1, 2010, on the network's Telebabad line up. The series concluded on July 30, 2010, with a total of 107 episodes.

== Cast and characters ==
Cast

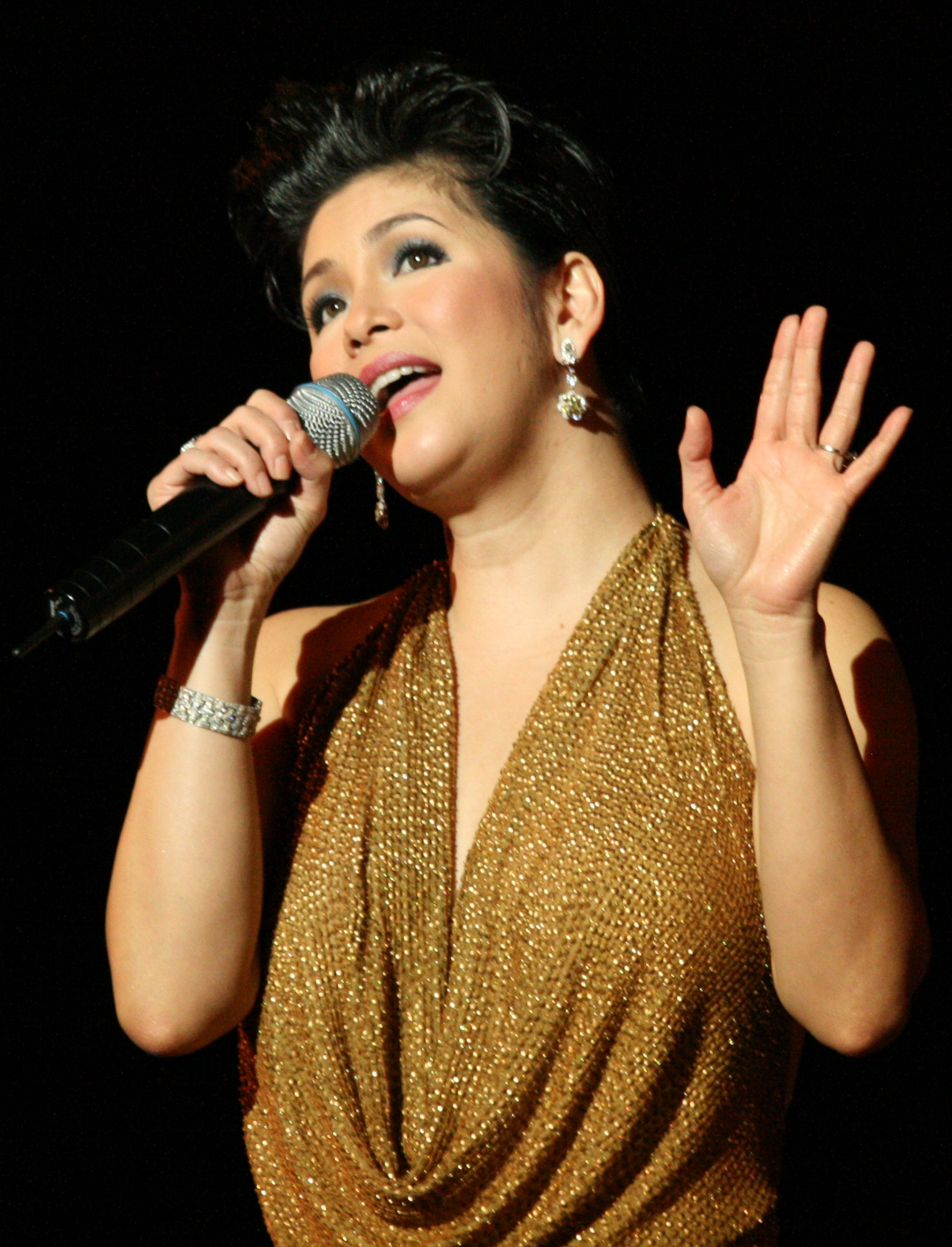
Regine Velasquez

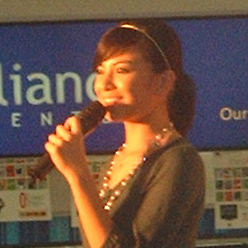
Glaiza de Castro

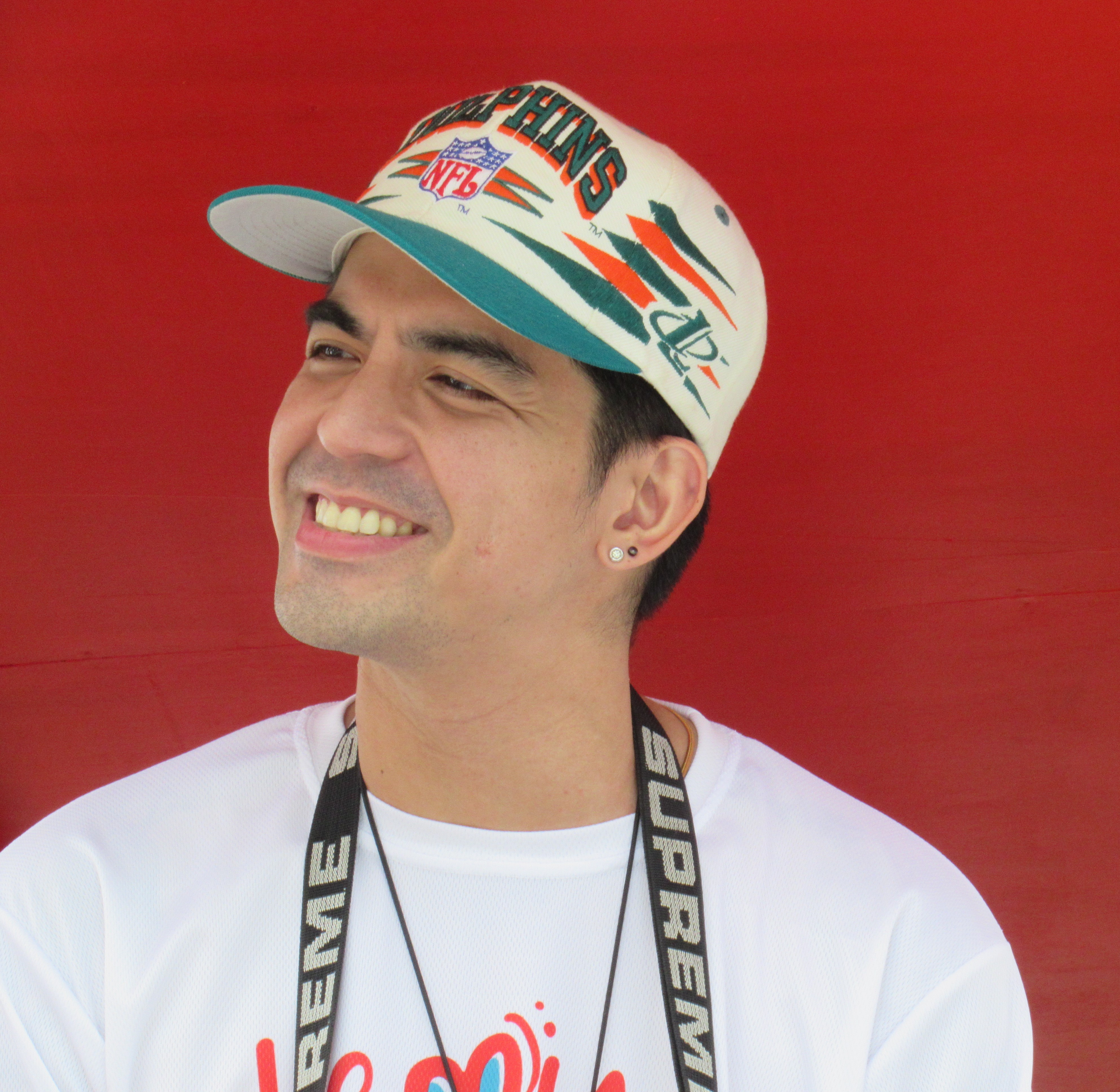
Mark Herras

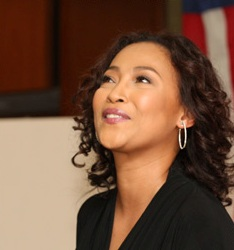
Jaya

Lead cast

- Regine Velasquez as Sampaguita "Sam" Fernandez / Melody

Supporting cast

- Rufa Mae Quinto as Lady Garcia Mendoza
- Mark Anthony Fernandez as Gary / Ate Kuh
- TJ Trinidad as Martin Valencia
- Glaiza de Castro as Tiffany Mendoza
- Mark Herras as Joey Pepe Smith Fernandez
- Jaya as Barang / Barbra
- Randy Santiago as George del Rosario
- Ynna Asistio as Vanessa
- Boboy Garovillo as Elvis Fernandez
- Gloria Diaz as Paula Abdul-Ah Fernandez

Recurring cast

- Enzo Pineda as Luke
- Gretchen Espina as Debbie Romasanta
- Michelle O'Bombshell as Elton
- Chariz Solomon as Did
- Caridad Sanchez as Aretha Abdul-Ah
- Yassi Pressman as Olivia
- Nadia Montenegro as Madonna
- Vangie Labalan as Glo
- Odette Khan as Eva
- Mang Enriquez as Barry Manilow
- Diego Llorico as Cams
- Carmen Soriano as Martin's mom
- Chinggoy Alonzo as Martin's dad
- Masculados
- Rochelle Pangilinan as Kelly Salvador / fake Sampaguita "Sam" Fernandez
- Sheena Halili as Lilet
- Mitch Valdez as Mother Superior
- Radha as Maria
- Pinky Amador as Leonora
- Eva Castillo as Theresa
- Scarlett as Bertha
- Tony Mabesa as a priest
- Elizabeth Ramsey as Turner
- Sef Cadayona as Marlon Legaspi
- Arci Muñoz as Natalie
- Dion Ignacio as Jay Z
- Alvin Aragon as Randy
- Sweet Ramos as younger Sampaguita
- Nikki Bagaporo as teenage Sampaguita and Stevie
- Sandy Talag as Charice
- JM Reyes as Mandy
- Renz Valerio as Lee
- Jason Abergido as Aaron
- Peejay as Andrew
- Vicki Belo as herself
- Bearwin Meily as Rey Toke
- Mike Hanopol
- Victor Wood
- Dexter Doria as Lady and Tiffany's mom
- Djanin Cruz as Marie
- German Moreno as Vernes
- Rachelle Ann Go as Demi
- Carlo Aquino as Joe
- Beverly Salviejo as Beth
- Ogie Alcasid as himself
- Dingdong Dantes as himself
- Vaness del Moral as teenage Eva
- Frencheska Farr as a host
- Gian Magdangal as a host
- Raymond Gutierrez as a talk show host

== Production ==
Principal photography commenced on February 15, 2010.

== Ratings ==
According to AGB Nielsen Philippines' Mega Manila household television ratings, the pilot episode of Diva earned a 24.6% rating. The final episode scored a 14.4% rating in Mega Manila People/Individual television ratings.
