= After the Rain (novel) =

1987 book by Norma Fox Mazer

- Author: Norma Fox Mazer
- Language: English
- Genre: Young adult literature
- Publisher: William Morrow and Company
- Publication date: 1987
- Publication place: United States

After the Rain is a 1987 young adult novel by Norma Fox Mazer about 15-year-old Rachel Cooper and her relationship with her dying grandfather. The book earned a Newbery Honor in 1988.
