= Full House Tonight =

2017 Philippine television variety show

- Title card
- Genre: Variety show
- Directed by: Louie Ignacio
- Presented by: Regine Velasquez
- Country of origin: Philippines
- Original language: Tagalog
- No. of episodes: 14

Production
- Executive producer: Paul Lester Chia
- Production locations: Studio 7, GMA Network Studios Annex, Quezon City, Philippines
- Camera setup: Multiple-camera setup
- Running time: 45 minutes
- Production company: GMA Entertainment TV

Original release
- Network: GMA Network
- Release: February 18 – May 27, 2017

Full House Tonight is a 2017 Philippine television variety show broadcast by GMA Network. Directed by Louie Ignacio, it is hosted by Regine Velasquez. It premiered on February 18, 2017 on the network's Sabado Star Power sa Gabi line up replacing Kapuso Movie Night. The show concluded on May 27, 2017, with a total of 14 episodes.

== Cast ==
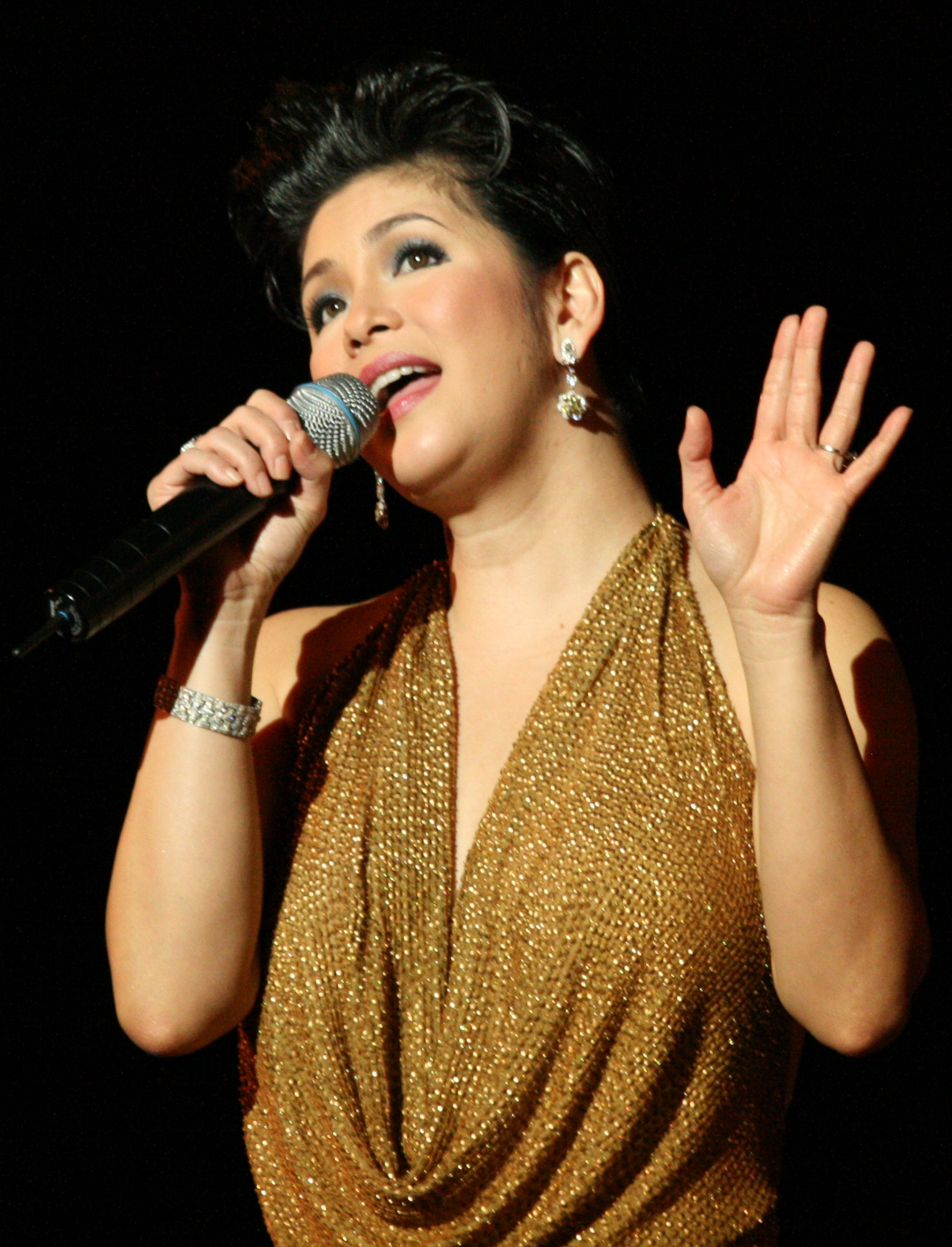
Regine Velasquez serves as the host.

- Regine Velasquez
- Solenn Heussaff
- Miguel Tanfelix
- Bianca Umali
- Joross Gamboa
- Kim Idol
- Nar Cabico
- Tammy Brown
- Terry Gian
- Boobay
- Philip Lazaro
- To the Top
- One Up

== Ratings ==
According to AGB Nielsen Philippines' Nationwide Urban Television Audience Measurement, the pilot episode of Full House Tonight earned an 11.8% rating. The final episode scored a 6.7% rating in Nationwide Urban Television Audience Measurement People in television homes.

== Accolades ==
Accolades received by Full House Tonight
Year	Award	Category	Recipient	Result	Ref.
2017	31st PMPC Star Awards for Television	Best Variety Show	Full House Tonight	Nominated	
2017	31st PMPC Star Awards for Television	Best Female TV Host	Regine Velasquez	Nominated	
