= R2K =

Studio album by Regine Velasquez
- Released: November 24, 1999
- Recorded: March–November 1999
- Studio: Bravo Recording Studios (Quezon City, Philippines); Jam Creations (Pasay, Philippines)
- Genre: Pop
- Length: 67:09
- Language: English
- Label: Viva
- Producer: Vic del Rosario Jr. (executive); Regine Velasquez (executive); Rene Salta (supervising); Patty Mayoralgo (associate)

Regine Velasquez chronology
Drawn (1998)	R2K (1999)	Unsolo (2000)

Singles from R2K
- 1. "On the Wings of Love" Released: September 1999; 2. "Fallin'" Released: October 1999; 3. "Lost Without Your Love" Released: November 18, 1999; 4. "For the Love of You" Released: November 26, 1999; 5. "In Your Eyes" Released: December 13, 1999; 6. "One Love" Released: December 26, 1999; 7. "I Don't Wanna Miss a Thing" Released: January 5, 2000; 8. "I'll Never Love This Way Again" Released: February 3, 2000

Professional ratings
Review scores
Source	Rating
AllMusic	3/5 stars
Artist Direct	3/5 stars

R2K is the tenth studio album by Filipino singer-actress Regine Velasquez, released in the Philippines on November 24, 1999, by Viva Records on CD and cassette formats and later on streaming and digital download. The album is Velasquez's second from Viva Records after Drawn. It consists of various covers of hits from the 1980's such as Jeffrey Osborne's "On the Wings of Love" to the 1990's such as Aerosmith's "I Don't Wanna Miss a Thing". The album was produced by Velasquez and sold more than 40,000 copies in its second week of release, earning a platinum certification, and was certified four times platinum a year later. R2K has since been certified twelve times platinum, becoming the highest-selling album by a female artist in the Philippines.

== Background ==
R2K is Velasquez' third all-covers album after Tagala Talaga and Retro. She also featured actor Gabby Eigenmann and MTV Pilipinas VJ KC Montero to do a rap adlib for her song "For the Love of You". It also marked the first time a Philippine artist released an album with a VCD. The VCD contains six music videos done by Velasquez with director Louie Ignacio including "One Love" which features actors Antoinette Taus and Dingdong Dantes. It is also the first time in the Philippines that a limited edition 48-page colored magazine was released together with the album.

== Release and promotion ==
As part of the album's promotion, Velasquez performed in small venue tours which included a three-date event at the Music Museum called Regine 2000. In January, it was reported that an arena concert was planned in support of the album. Shortly after, it was announced that Velasquez would perform two shows on April 7–8, 2000 at the Araneta Coliseum, officially named R2K: The Concert. Velasquez and her team selected Ogie Alcasid, Gabby Eigenmann, Janno Gibbs, Jaya, and KC Montero as special guests. The concerts received generally positive reviews from music critics, who praised Velasquez's performances, as well as the stage production. She garnered a Best Female Major Concert Act win at the Aliw Awards for the show.

== Track listing ==
"On the Wings of Love" (1999)
A 30-second sample of the Jeffrey Osborne love ballad which is the record's opening track.

"I Don't Wanna Miss a Thing" (1999)
This clip features the final chorus of the Aerosmith rock ballad backed by a fresh arrangement highlighting Velasquez's vocal acrobatics.

Credits are adapted from the liner notes of R2K.

R2K – Standard edition
No.	Title	Writer(s)	Original artist(s)	Length
1.	"On the Wings of Love"	Jeffrey Osborne; Peter Schless	Jeffrey Osborne	4:10
2.	"One Love"	John Bettis; Richard Carpenter	The Carpenters	3:59
3.	"Dancing Queen"	Björn Ulvaeus; Benny Andersson; Stig Anderson	ABBA	3:41
4.	"The Long and Winding Road"	John Lennon; Paul McCartney	The Beatles	3:53
5.	"If Ever You're in My Arms Again"	Cynthia Weil; Michael Masser; Tom Snow	Peabo Bryson	4:26
6.	"Mac Arthur Park"	Jimmy Webb	Richard Harris / Donna Summer	5:03
7.	"Lost Without Your Love"	David Gates	Bread	3:25
8.	"Music of Goodbye" (music from the movie Out of Africa)	Alan and Marilyn Bergman	Melissa Manchester & Al Jarreau	4:19
9.	"Fallin'" (music from the musical They're Playing Our Song)	Carole Bayer Sager (lyrics); Marvin Hamlisch (music)	Teri DeSario	3:13
10.	"I'll Never Love This Way Again"	Richard Kerr; Will Jennings	Dionne Warwick	4:33
11.	"Holiday"	Klaus Meine; Rudolf Schenker	Scorpions	4:23
12.	"Music & Me"	Jerry Marcellino; Mel Larson; Don Fenceton; Mike Cannon	Michael Jackson	3:32
13.	"In Your Eyes"	Daniel Grafton Hill; Michael Masser	George Benson	3:29
14.	"For the Love of You" (featuring KC Montero & Gabby Eigenmann)	Ronald Isley; O'Kelly Isley, Jr.; Rudolph Isley; Chris Jasper	The Isley Brothers	5:34
15.	"Hello Again" (music from the movie The Jazz Singer)	Neil Diamond; Alan Lindgren	Neil Diamond	3:31
16.	"I Don't Wanna Miss a Thing"	Diane Warren	Aerosmith	4:39
Total length:				67:09

R2K – Bonus Track edition
No.	Title	Writer(s)	Original artist(s)	Length
17.	"Love Songs Medley" ("I'll Always Love You" / "Love Is All That Matters" / "Longer" / "More Than You'll Ever Know")	Eric Kaz & Snow ("I'll Always Love You"); Eric Carmen ("Love Is All That Matters"); Dan Fogelberg ("Longer"); Michael Ruff ("More Than You'll Ever Know")	Michael Johnson ("I'll Always Love You"); Carmen ("Love Is All That Matters"); Fogelberg ("Longer"); Ruff ("More Than You'll Ever Know")	6:14
Total length:				73:23

R2K – Limited CD+VCD edition (The Music Videos)
No.	Title	Length
1.	"For the Love of You" (music video featuring KC Montero & Gabby Eigenmann)
2.	"In Your Eyes" (music video)
3.	"Fallin'" (music video)
4.	"One Love" (music video)
5.	"Lost Without Your Love" (music video)
6.	"On the Wings of Love" (music video)

Notes

- "Love Songs Medley" is not included on the cassette, digital and streaming formats of the album and only available on certain CD pressings.

== Sales and certifications ==
Region	Certification	Certified units/sales
Philippines (PARI)	12× Platinum	480,000^{*}
^{*} Sales figures based on certification alone.

== Release history ==
Region	Release date	Label	Edition	Catalogue
Philippines	November 24, 1999	Viva	Standard (CD+VCD)	VCD-99-052
Philippines	November 24, 1999	Viva	Standard (Cassette)	VC-99-058

== See also ==
- Regine Velasquez discography
- List of best-selling albums in the Philippines
