= Paano Kita Iibigin =

- Theatrical movie poster
- Directed by: Joyce Bernal
- Screenplay by: John Paul Abellera; Vanessa Valdez; Mel Mendoza-del Rosario
- Story by: Tammy Bejerano; John Paul Abellera
- Produced by: Vicente G. del Rosario III; Vic del Rosario Jr.; Veronique Del Rosario-Corpus; Malou N. Santos; Charo Santos-Concio
- Starring: Regine Velasquez; Piolo Pascual
- Cinematography: Charlie Peralta
- Edited by: Marya Ignacio
- Music by: Raul Mitra
- Production company: Viva Films
- Distributed by: ABS-CBN Film Productions (Note: Co-produced and co-distributed under the joint label, Star Cinema/ABS-CBN Film Productions)
- Release date: May 30, 2007
- Running time: 115 Minutes
- Country: Philippines
- Language: Tagalog
- Box office: ₱79,834,341.00

Paano Kita Iibigin (transl. How can I love you) is a 2007 Filipino romance film starring Regine Velasquez and Piolo Pascual, directed by Bb. Joyce Bernal. It is their on-screen pairing following "Ang Iibigin Ko'y Ikaw" episode of IBC's defunct weekly drama series Habang May Buhay in 2000 and the "Lobo" episode of ABS-CBN's now-defunct weekly anthology drama series Maalaala Mo Kaya in 2001.

Pascual is the main host of ABS-CBN's ASAP which airs opposite GMA's SOP, hosted by Velasquez. Paano Kita Iibigin marked the first time that Pascual worked with Viva Films and the first time that Velasquez worked with Star Cinema. He also remained in Walang Kapalit alongside Claudine Barretto which premiered on April 23 a month later.

Paano Kita Iibigin is the third co-production between Star Cinema and Viva Films after 2006's Wag Kang Lilingon and this year's Ang Cute ng Ina Mo!. This is the third full-length film of Pascual with director Bernal after 2003's Till There Was You and 2006's Don't Give Up on Us. This is the fourth full-length film of Velasquez with director Joyce Bernal after working together in 1999's Dahil May Isang Ikaw, 2000's Kailangan Ko'y Ikaw and 2001's Pangako...Ikaw Lang.

This Philippine-made romantic drama opened on May 30, 2007, in the Philippines. It was rated B by the Cinema Evaluation Board. The movie made P78,128,341. When the DVD was released, it sold 15,000 DVD after two days of sale and became the first Filipino DVD release to be awarded with a Gold Certification in just three days of release. The soundtrack went Gold award after three weeks. The soundtrack reached Double Platinum status with more than 60,000 sales based on Regine's record sales in YES! Magazine's list of the 20 stars who ruled the decade.

The film was digitally restored and remastered in high definition by the ABS-CBN Film Restoration Project and Central Digital Lab and this is the first to test it out on the Viva Films co-production. The restored version was released on April 27, 2021, through KTX.ph with a pre-show, hosted by Leo P. Katigbak (head of ABS-CBN Film Archives) with the attendance of the cast members Regine Velasquez, Piolo Pascual, Eugene Domingo, and staff members including writer John Paul Abellera.

== Synopsis ==
Terminated from her job and evicted from her apartment, Martina "Martee" Diamzon (Regine Velasquez) brings herself and her asthmatic son, Liam, to Zambales for a vacation. In a dilapidated resort owned by Lance Monteagundo (Piolo Pascual) and fronted by a motley crew of a resort staff led by Liwayway (Eugene Domingo), she finds work as a manager after Liam accidentally damages Lance's motorcycle. At first, Martee finds it hard to adjust to Lance's abrasive personality and the provincial lifestyle, but she takes the opportunity to escape from her problems back home.

Whenever they work together, Lance and Martee always clash. As they spend more time with each other, they discover other facets of each other's personalities. Martee changes Lance's outlook in life, and he starts to fall for her. At the same time, Martee learns to laugh and enjoy life again.

While Martee seems to be ready to step out of her comfort zone, Lance is not yet ready to give up his "ultimate" plan. When Martee learns of Lance's involvement in a collision that killed his girlfriend and friends, she begins to understand where he's coming from.

However, Lance has an untimely meeting with his dead girlfriend's family. Lance reverts to his old lifestyle. At this point, Martee thinks she can handle this because she truly loves him. When Lance's volatility starts to hurt her son, Martee realizes that this is too much for her. This time, she must choose between love and family. And she must decide if she should follow her heart even when it has already been broken before.

== Cast ==
=== Main cast ===
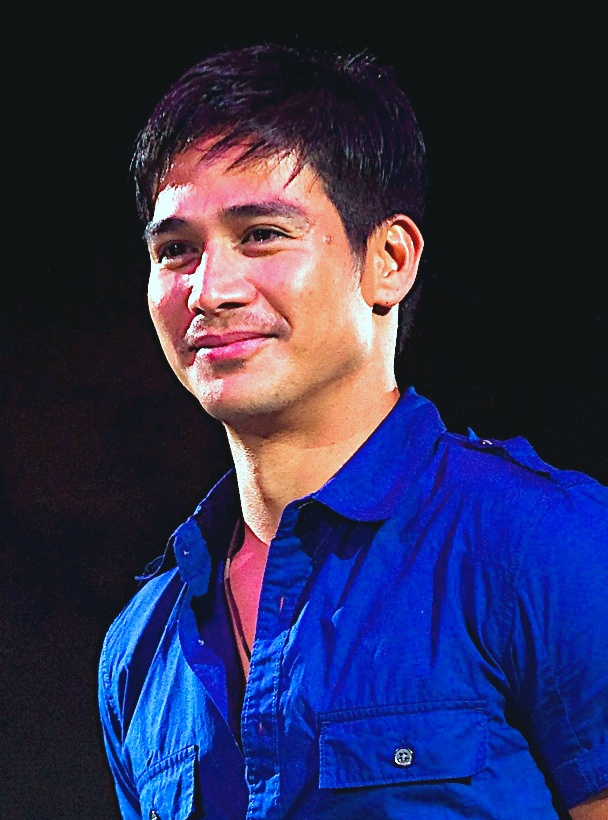
Piolo Pascual portrays Lance.

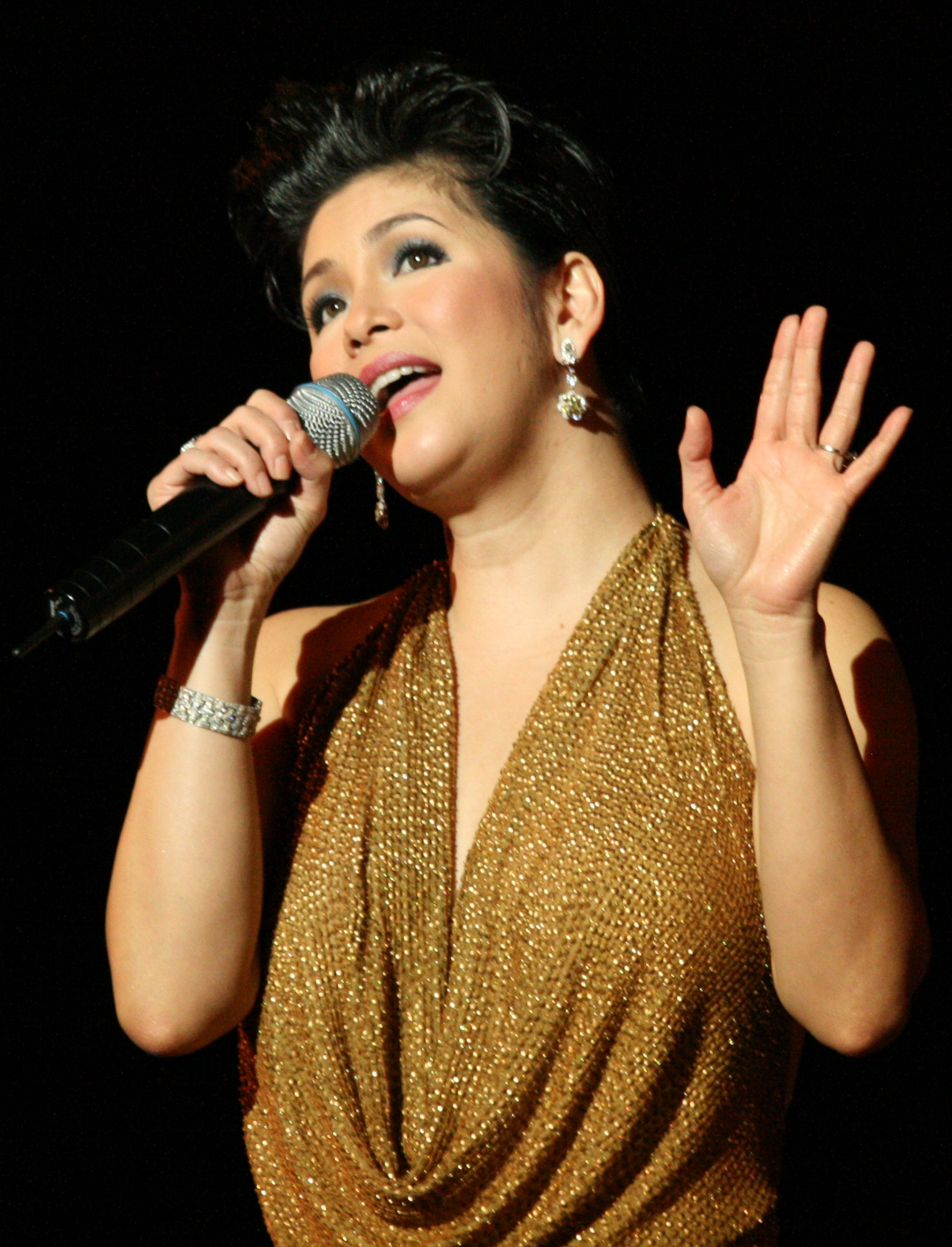
Regine Velasquez portrays Martee

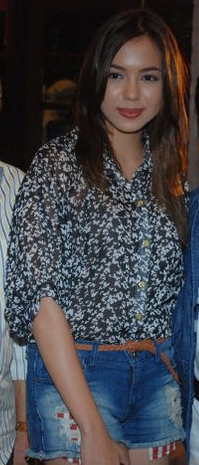
Julia Montes portrays, Lance's young Sister

- Piolo Pascual as Lance Monteagundo
- Regine Velasquez as Martina "Martee" Diamzon

=== Supporting cast ===
- Eugene Domingo as Liwayway
- Quintin Alianza as Liam
- Iya Villania as Tessa
- Erich Gonzales as Guada
- Hyubs Azarcon as George
- Rhap Salazar as Lorenzo
- Gian Terry as Tomas
- Paw Diaz as Maureen
- Robin Da Roza as Allan
- Beth Tamayo as Lisa
- Leo Rialp as Simon
- Menggie Cobarrubias as Leon
- Mark Bautista as Raffy
- Roence Santos as Belinda
- Denise Joaquin as Rosy
- Rico Barrera as Roy
- Tessie Villarama as Gilda
- Polly Cadsawan as Zoilo
- C.J. Javarata as Dianne
- Maris Dimayuga as Angel
- Jordan Zuniga as Francis
- Maynard Lapid as Jojo

=== Extended cast ===
- JC Cuadrado as Chicoy
- Jett Pangan as Mon
- Jigo Garcia as Dr. Roxas
- Julia Montes as Lance's young sister
- Tess Gonzales as Janet
- Andy Garcia as Manyakis na Call Center Agent
- Krisheela Gonzales as Nina
- Nico Deyro as Nico
- Marco Morales as Sean

=== Cameo appearances ===
- Iñigo Pascual as Young Lance
- PJ Valerio as Young Allan
- R.J. Yap as Racer's Girlfriend
- Eileen Buencamino as Racer's Girlfriend
- Ann Ruffols as Racer's Girlfriend
- Celine Hizon as Sexy Girl
- Giovan Bernardino as Car Racer
- Alex Perez as Car Racer
- Jimy Mendoza as Asst. Mechanic
- Buds Cabading as Asst. Mechanic
- Erwin Dematera as Toy Plane Operator
- April Rose Alsaca as Nurse
- Edwin Magat as Driver
- Erwin Jacutan as Guada's suitor friend
- Ariel Lugue as Guada's suitor friend
- Mercy Academia as Old Couple
- Carlos Academia as Old Couple
- Jake Yabut as Young Couple
- Kristel Anne Cleopas as Young Couple
- Jomar Dayrit as Judge
- Kisha Carullo as Judge's Secretary
- Hirochi Ushida as Japanese Buyer
- Kim Miura as Japanese Buyer
- Erik Perez as Japanese Buyer
- Roger Round as American Buyer

== Soundtrack ==
The 12-track OST album contained mostly original songs performed by the lead stars of the movie, Regine Velasquez and Piolo Pascual. The songs were solos and duets, a complete collaboration between the two singer-actors. The album was produced by the lead actress herself who is an accomplished record producer. Velasquez also provided back-up vocals on most tracks.

The album contains original songs penned by Ogie Alcasid, Mon Faustino among others.

1. Paano Kita Iibigin (4:42) - Piolo Pascual & Regine Velasquez
2. Lalala (3:10) - Piolo Pascual
3. Paano Kita Iibigin (4:24) - Regine Velasquez
4. My World With You (3:38) - Piolo Pascual & Regine Velasquez
5. Manhid (4:22) - Regine Velasquez
6. With You (4:21) - Piolo Pascual
7. Muling Magmamahal (4:58) - Piolo Pascual & Regine Velasquez
8. Tahan (3:04) - Regine Velasquez
9. Angel Eyes (4:06) - Piolo Pascual
10. Pare Ko (5:29) - Regine Velasquez
11. Paano Kita Iibigin (4:42) - Piolo Pascual
12. Sana Nga (3:51) - Piolo Pascual & Regine Velasquez

== Awards and recognitions ==
- 56th Filipino Academy of Movie Arts and Sciences Awards (FAMAS Awards) nominations
  ACTOR - Piolo Pascual
  ACTRESS - Regine Velasquez
  ART DIRECTION - Chris Ecker de Guzman
  CHILD ACTOR - Quintin Alianza
  CINEMATOGRAPHY - Charlie Peralta
  EDITING - Marya Ignacio
  MUSICAL SCORE - Raul Mitra
  PICTURE
  SCREENPLAY - John Paul Abellera, Vanessa Valdez and Mel Mendoza-del Rosario
  STORY - John Paul Abellera and Tammy Bejerano-Dinopol
  SUPPORTING ACTOR - Robin da Roza
  SUPPORTING ACTRESS - Eugene Domingo
- 24th PMPC Star Awards for Movies
  Movie Musical Scorer of the Year - Raul Mitra
  Movie Original Theme Song of the Year - Paano Kita Iibigin (Piolo Pascual and Regine Velasquez)
- Nomination for Luna Awards, Best Actress and Best Actor for Regine Velasquez and Piolo Pascual this 2008.
