= Ako si Kim Samsoon =

2008 Philippine television drama series

- Title card
- Also known as: My Name is Kim Samsoon
- Genre: Drama; Romantic comedy
- Based on: My Lovely Sam Soon (2005) by Kim Do Woo
- Developed by: Denoy Navarro-Punio
- Directed by: Dominic Zapata; Khryss Adalia; Louie Ignacio
- Starring: Regine Velasquez
- Theme music composer: Bobby Velasco; Agatha Obar
- Opening theme: "Maybe It's You" by Regine Velasquez
- Country of origin: Philippines
- Original language: Tagalog
- No. of episodes: 75

Production
- Executive producer: Edlyn Tallada Abuel
- Production locations: Metro Manila, Philippines; Tagaytay, Philippines
- Camera setup: Multiple-camera setup
- Running time: 30–45 minutes
- Production company: GMA Entertainment TV

Original release
- Network: GMA Network
- Release: June 30 – October 10, 2008

Ako si Kim Samsoon (transl. I am Kim Samsoon / international title: My Name is Kim Samsoon) is a 2008 Philippine television drama romantic comedy series broadcast by GMA Network. The series is based on a 2005 South Korean television series My Lovely Sam Soon. Directed by Dominic Zapata, Khryss Adalia and Louie Ignacio, it stars Regine Velasquez in the title role. It premiered on June 30, 2008, on the network's Telebabad line up. The series concluded on October 10, 2008, with a total of 75 episodes.

== Cast and characters ==
Cast

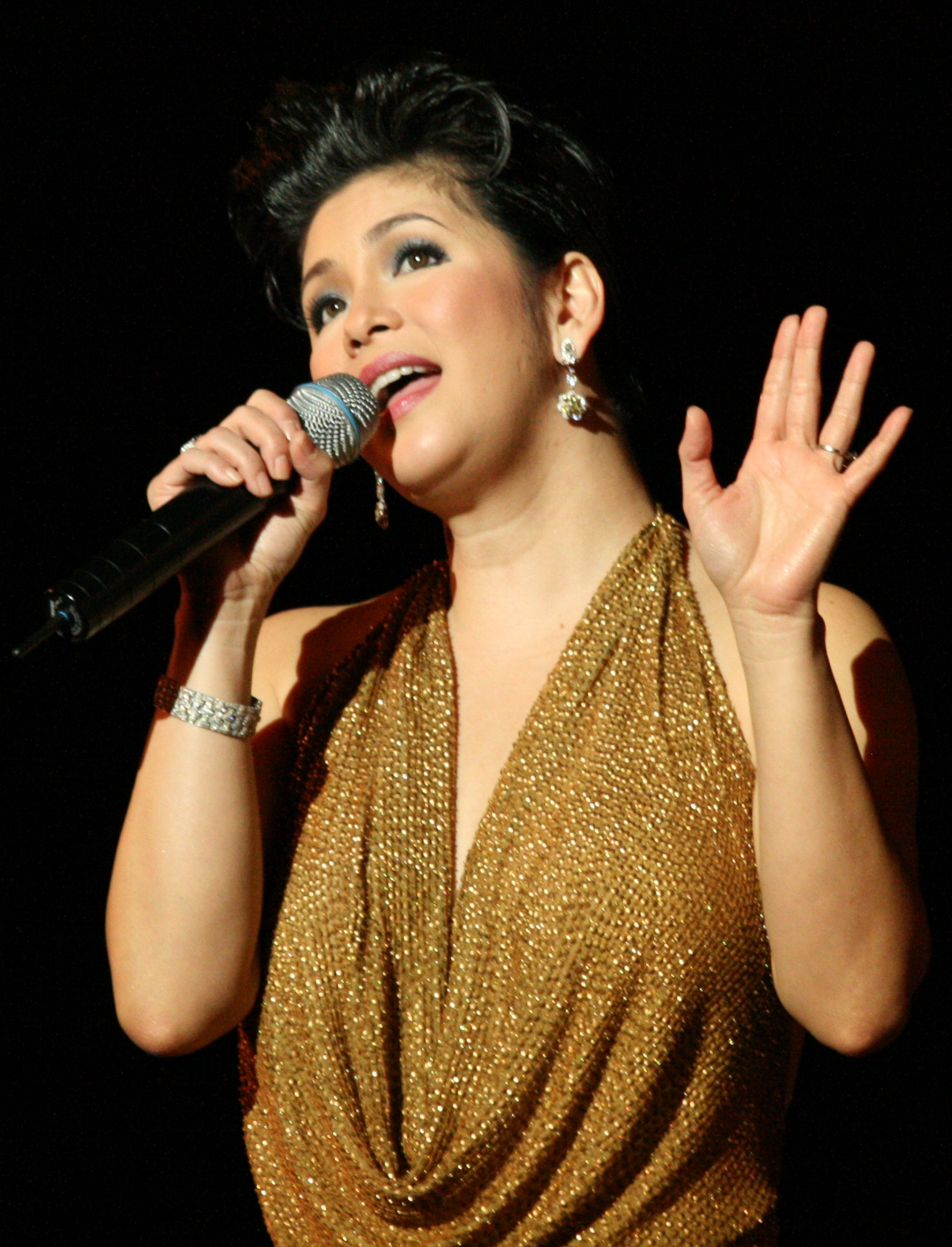
Regine Velasquez

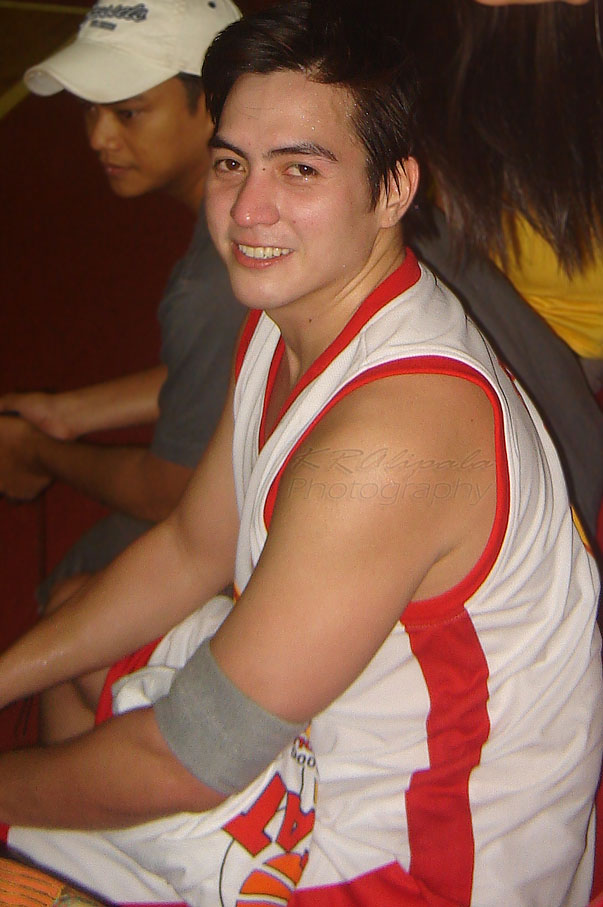
Wendell Ramos

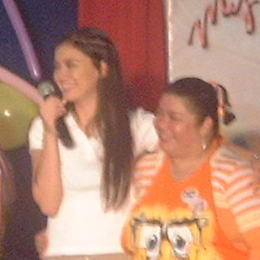
Nadine Samonte (left)

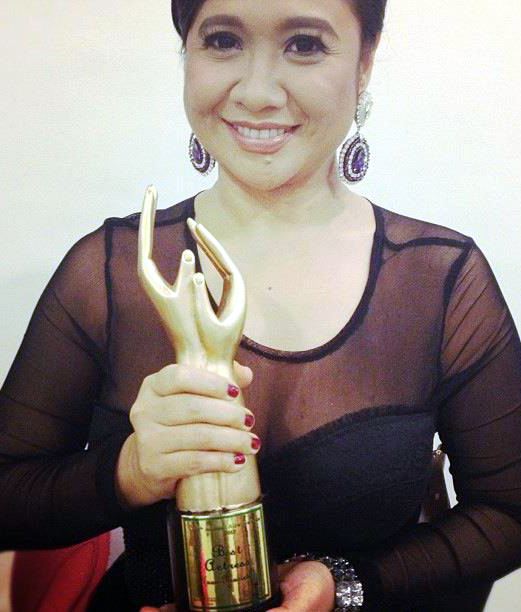
Eugene Domingo

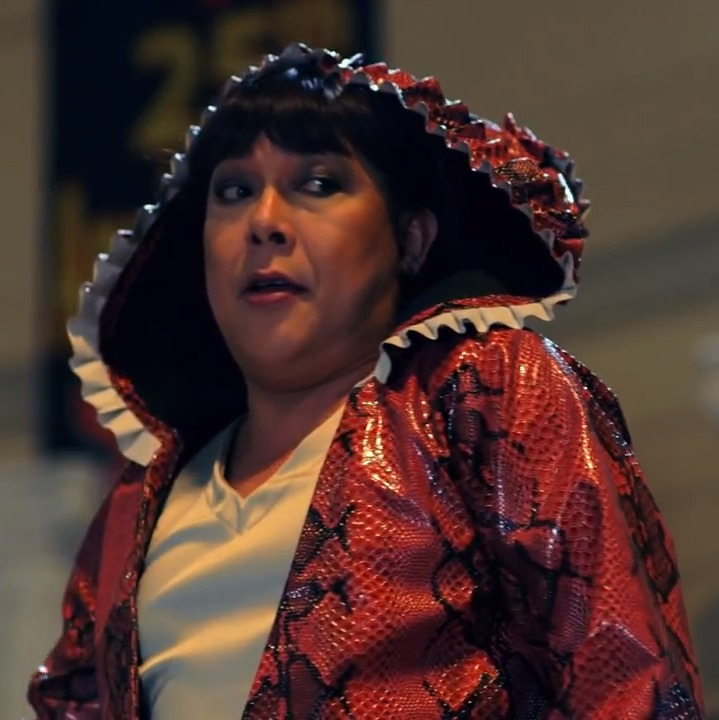
John Lapus

Lead cast

- Regine Velasquez as Kim Samsoon Buot

Supporting cast

- Mark Anthony Fernandez as Cyrus Ruiz
- Wendell Ramos as Harvey De Guzman
- Nadine Samonte as Hannah Villanueva
- Tessie Tomas as Sonia Buot
- Carmi Martin as Roció Ruiz
- Eugene Domingo as Dina
- John Lapus as Marcus
- Sheena Halili as Cynthia
- Marky Lopez as James
- Cheska Eugenio as Amber Ruiz
- Martin Escudero as Kokoy
- Arci Muñoz as Dess
- Pauleen Luna as Cherry Fuentebella
- Dido dela Paz as Samuel Buot
- Maureen Larrazabal as Mau Timbol
- Jennica Garcia as Eliza Buot
- Vangie Labalan as Brenda Timbol
- Marcus Madrigal as Dodong
- Kevin Santos as Aaron
- Stef Prescott as Ivy
- Princess Violago as Gigi
- Jade Lopez as Vicky

Guest cast

- Gene Padilla as Mau's husband
- Toby Alejar as Enrico
- Cheska Garcia as Nicole
- Chinggoy Alonzo as Mr. Sandoval
- Tiya Pusit as a doctor
- Mely Tagasa as a judge
- Madam Auring as Rocha
- Lydia de Vega as Kim Samsoon's trainer

== Development ==
My Lovely Sam Soon is a 2005 South Korean television series broadcast by MBC TV. In 2006, it was broadcast in the Philippines through GMA Network.

== Ratings ==
According to AGB Nielsen Philippines' Mega Manila household television ratings, the pilot episode of Ako si Kim Samsoon earned a 33.8% rating. The final episode scored a 38.2% rating.
