= Kailangan Ko'y Ikaw =

- Directed by: Bb. Joyce Bernal
- Written by: Mel Mendoza-del Rosario
- Produced by: Vincent G. del Rosario III; Veronique del Rosario-Corpus
- Starring: Robin Padilla; Regine Velasquez
- Cinematography: Charley S. Peralta
- Edited by: Bb. Joyce Bernal
- Music by: Raul Mitra
- Production company: Viva Films
- Release date: October 11, 2000
- Running time: 127 minutes
- Country: Philippines
- Language: Filipino

Kailangan Ko'y Ikaw is a 2000 Filipino romantic comedy film edited and directed by Joyce Bernal and written by Mel Mendoza-del Rosario. Produced by Viva Films and RCP Productions, it stars Regine Velasquez as a popular singer and Robin Padilla as a car mechanic who falls in love with her.

It is the first project that Padilla and Velasquez worked together on, as well as the first time Padilla did a romantic comedy film since his action films from Viva Films.

== Plot ==
Francine Natra is a popular singer enjoying the peak of her career, but due to stardom and her hectic schedules she suffers from a simple life on her own. Meanwhile, Guillermo "Gimo" Talumpati lives his ordinary life as an auto mechanic taking care of his family and especially his sister Ging-Ging, who has Down syndrome. Their fates cross when a promo contest called "Date With A Star" makes Gimo the winner to take the popular Francine on a special date. But the prize date gets cut short when Francine's suitor Alex appears while Gimo was star struck to her.

Feeling cheated, Gimo schemes his way to abduct the singer to be able to get to know her and carry out the prize date. Realizing what Francine was missing, living life's simple pleasures, she becomes closer to him. Being the honest person that he is, Gimo also falls in love with her. Until his sister had to go for a medical operation that needed an amount of money that their relationship went public. As a consequence Gimo cannot handle Francine's showbiz world. With her popularity and his pride, their relationship breaks off after an argument. Disappointed, Francine leaves and clarifies the issue about Gimo. Days later, Francine kidnaps Gimo and asks him to marry her. He quickly realizes he has made the biggest mistake of his life by letting her go. They marry, the film concluding with a shot of Francine giving birth to their first child.

== Cast ==
- Regine Velasquez as Francine Natra
- Robin Padilla as Guillermo "Gimo" Talumpati
- John Lapus as Sweet
- Mitch Valdes as Maggie
- Ray Ventura as Tatay
- Roldan Aquino as Tomas
- Butz Aquino as Francine's father
- Marita Zobel as Francine's mother
- Alvin Anson as Alex
- Rufa Mae Quinto as Lovely
- Joy Viado as Di
- Katya Santos as Bel
- Shermaine Santiago as Mayumi
- Metring David as Gimo's grandmother
- Rey Pumaloy as TV host
- Robert "Long" Mejia as a barangay slacker
- Inday Garutay as Liwayway Laway
- Anton Diva as Virgin Velasquez

== Reception ==
=== Critical reception ===
Robin's performance was praised by most critics; also the film itself received fair reviews. Film critic, Noel Vera, suggested, "the movie is actually very good." Also praising the direction of Bernal stating "that Bernal is directing; an accomplished editor, knows how to pace the film, to keep it moving along." Pilipino Star Ngayon's Salve V. Asis stated that this film’s premise was already done before yet the director translates the conflict and providing it with a good twist to be able to come up with something very original.

=== Commercial reception ===
Kailangan Ko'y Ikaw was released in the Philippines on October 11, 2000. The movie was a certified box office hit during its run. It became one of the local films to have such a long line for the midnight screening during the 2000s.

=== TV spin-off ===
In 2013, ABS-CBN announced that they are planning to produce a new series of the same name but have yet to disclose if the story will by similar to that of the film. Robin Padilla, however, will star in the series with actresses Kris Aquino and Anne Curtis.

== Music ==
A soundtrack was released by Viva Records. The album was consists of Regine Velasquez recordings just entirely for the film. Including the song "Kailangan Ko'y Ikaw", composed by Ogie Alcasid which released as the carrier single and as the movie main theme song. He did it because Velasquez asked him to compose an original OPM song for the film’s love theme. The soundtrack also featured songs by artists including Ely Buendia and Gabby Eigenmann and two hit singles from Regine Velasquez: "Kailangan Ko'y Ikaw" and cover of "Tuwing Umuulan". The film score was written by Raul Mitra.

== See also ==
- Regine Velasquez filmography
