= Eva Castillo =

Filipino musician (1969–2022)

- Born: Minerva Castillo; December 29, 1969; Tondo, Manila, Philippines
- Origin: amateur singing contests
- Died: March 22, 2022 (aged 52) Manila, Philippines
- Occupation: Singer
- Years active: 2009–2017

Minerva “Eva” Castillo (December 29, 1969 – March 22, 2022) was a Filipino singer.

== Biography ==
=== Early life ===
Minerva Castillo started singing at the age of nine. She endured a childhood of emotional and financial poverty.

In her teenage years, Castillo competed in various amateur singing contests with Regine Velasquez. Castillo won over 300 trophies in these amateur singing contests.

A singing contest in the 1980s known as Ang Bagong Kampeon stopped their competition.

=== Rediscovery ===
At the Regine: Roots to Riches, GMA-7's special offering for Velasquez's birthday, Castillo was rediscovered. She recorded the theme song of the show Sine Novela: Kung Aagawin Mo Ang Lahat Sa Akin. Allan K. hired Eva to perform in his club, Klownz, on Quezon Avenue every Thursday night. Castillo's life story was featured in SRO Cinemaserye, where Glaiza de Castro and Manilyn Reynes portrayed the adolescent and adult Castillo respectively. She also appeared on SOP Rules.

== Filmography ==
=== Television ===
Year	Title	Role	Network	Notes
2009	Mel & Joey	Herself	GMA Network	Guest
2009	SOP	Herself	GMA Network	Guest Performer
2009	Roots to Riches	Herself	GMA Network	Special Guest
2010	Diva	Sister Theresa	GMA Network	Guest
2017	Tawag ng Tanghalan (season 1)	Herself	ABS-CBN	Contestant

== Recordings ==
Title/Song	Album	Year
Kung Aagawin Mo Ang Lahat Sa Akin		2009
