= Urduja (film) =

- Theatrical release poster
- Directed by: Reggie Entienza
- Screenplay by: Reggie Entienza
- Story by: Reggie Entienza; Michael Tuivera
- Produced by: Antonio P. Tuviera
- Starring: Regine Velasquez-Alcasid; Cesar Montano; Eddie Garcia; Johnny Delgado; Jay Manalo; Ruby Rodriguez; Epy Quizon; Michael V. Allan K.
- Edited by: Manet Dayrit
- Music by: Mon Faustino; Noel Zarate
- Production companies: APT Entertainment; Seventoon; Imaginary Friends
- Distributed by: APT Entertainment
- Release date: June 18, 2008
- Running time: 100 minutes
- Country: Philippines
- Language: Filipino
- Box office: ₱31 million

Urduja is a 2008 Philippine animated historical fantasy film based on the legend of the warrior princess Urduja of Pangasinan. It was the first of two locally produced (in the Philippines) animated films set for release in 2008. The other, Dayo, was released as an entry for the 2008 Metro Manila Film Festival.

The film was created by an all-Filipino group of animators and made using the traditional (hand-drawn) animation process. It also features an all-Filipino cast of voice actors. Urduja was released on June 18, 2008, and earned ₱20 million during its premiere, surpassing the milestone of Adarna's grossing release but still unsuccessful in getting the audience interest which resulted in loss of profit.

== Cast ==
- Regine Velasquez as Princess Urduja, the titular character and Lakanpati's daughter. Singer Regine Velasquez was handpicked by Antonio Tuviera to play the title role.
- Cesar Montano as Limhang, the Chinese pirate who landed on the Tawalisi shore and Princess Urduja's love interest.
- Eddie Garcia as Lakanpati, Chief of the Tawilisi tribe and Princess Urduja's father.
- Jay Manalo as Simakwel, Princess Urduja's fiancé.
- Johnny Delgado as Wang, Limhang's nemesis.
- Ruby Rodriguez as Mayumi, Princess Urduja's best friend.
- Epy Quizon as Daisuke, Limhang's Japanese samurai best friend and right-hand man. Mayumi has a crush on him.
- Michael V. as Kukut, Limhang's pet mouse.
- Allan K. as Tarsir, Princess Urduja's pet tarsier.
- BJ Forbes as Botyok, the boy Simakwel takes as hostage from the Badjao tribe.

== Production ==
Produced using a mixture of digital and traditional animation techniques, the film took eleven years of conceptualization or pre-production and was done roughly for two years of animation development by approximately 400-500 Filipino animators and three different animation studios situated within Luzon and Visayan areas, produced more than 120,000 drawings that ran in 1,922 scenes equivalent to 8,771 feet of film.

== Release ==
The film earned ₱20 million during its premiere and gained a box office hit of roughly ₱31 million over unstated production cost, surpassing the milestone of Adarna's grossing release but still unsuccessful in getting the audience interest which resulted in loss of profit.
