= Raul Mitra =

- Occupations: Composer, songwriter, lyricist, arranger, record producer
- Years active: 1999–present
- Spouse: Cacai Velasquez-Mitra
- Musical career
- Genres: OPM, pop, R&B, classical, gospel, adult-contemporary
- Instruments: Piano, keyboards, synthesizers

Raul Mitra is a Filipino composer, arranger, songwriter, musical director, pianist, and keyboardist. He is the son of former House Speaker Ramon V. Mitra.

== Personal life ==
As a child born out of wedlock to politician Ramon Mitra Jr., Raul Mitra filed a lawsuit in July 2000 against his father's former domestic partner Tess Bustos with the assistance of lawyers Harry Roque and Joel Butuyan to argue for a share of his father's estate.

Mitra is married to singer Cacai Velasquez-Mitra, who is a sister to singer and actress Regine Velasquez, Mitra's frequent professional collaborator.

== Film scores ==
- R2K: The TV Special (television film, 2000)
- Kailangan Ko'y Ikaw (2000)
- Arayyy (2000)
- Buhay Kamao (2001)
- Pangako... Ikaw Lang (2001)
- Cool Dudes 24/7 (2001)
- Pagdating ng Panahon (2001)
- Till There Was You (2003)
- Pangarap Ko ang Ibigin Ka (2003)
- Kung Ako na Lang Sana (2003)
- Milan (2004)
- All My Life (2004)
- Don't Give Up On Us (2006)
- You Are the One (2006)
- You Got Me! (2007)
- Paano Kita Iibigin (2007)
- I've Fallen for You (2007)
- Love Me Again (Land Down Under) (2008)
- Roots to Riches (television film, 2009)
- Paano Na Kaya (2010)
- No Other Woman (2011)
- One More Try (2012)
- Four Sisters and a Wedding (2013)
- Kasal (2018)

== Awards ==
Year	Award	Category	Work	Result
2014	FAMAS Award	Best Musical Score	Four Sisters and a Wedding	Nominated
2013	FAMAS Award	Best Musical Score	One More Try	Nominated
2012	FAMAS Award	Best Musical Score	No Other Woman	Nominated
2008	FAMAS Award	Best Musical Score	Paano Kita IIbigin	Nominated
2007	FAMAS Award	Best Musical Score	Don't Give Up On Us	Nominated
2002	FAMAS Award	Best Musical Score	Pangako... Ikaw Lang	Nominated
2013	Luna Award	Best Music	One More Try	Nominated
2012	Luna Award	Best Musical Score	No Other Woman	Won
2014	Star Awards for Movies	Movie Musical Scorer of the Year	Four Sisters and a Wedding	Nominated
2013	Star Awards for Movies	Movie Musical Scorer of the Year	One More Try	Nominated
2012	Star Awards for Movies	Movie Musical Scorer of the Year	No Other Woman	Nominated
2008	Star Awards for Movies	Movie Musical Scorer of the Year	Paano Kita IIbigin	Won
2007	Star Awards for Movies	Movie Musical Scorer of the Year	You Are the One	Nominated
2007	Star Awards for Movies	Movie Musical Scorer of the Year	Don't Give Up On Us	Nominated
