= Wilma V. Galvante =

Filipino television producer

- Born: Wilma Valle Galvante; Manila, Philippines
- Education: Pamantasan ng Lungsod ng Maynila
- Occupations: Former Head of Entertainment Division, TV5; Former Senior Vice President for Entertainment TV, GMA Network; TV producer

Wilma Valle Galvante is the former head of TV5's entertainment division and the former Senior Vice President for entertainment at GMA Network. She is also a producer of numerous TV shows.

As the head of GMA Network's entertainment, she worked on dramas, light-hearted shows, and hired writers. She revived the love team, popularized in the 1970s, resurrected local comic titles, and introduced fantasy series in prime time, such as Mulawin. The network brought the rights to a number of local comic titles, such as Darna and Captain Barbell. By late 2003, GMA's primetime programs outperformed those of its competing network.

In September 2015, Galvante left the post to form Content Cows Company Inc. which produced TV5 programs including Happy Truck ng Bayan and Wattpad Presents.

Since 2021, Galvante has been a content consultant for Net 25, the flagship television station of the Eagle Broadcasting Corporation.

On top of her career as a TV/Media personality, Galvante has been appointed by the Office of the Mayor and the City Council of Manila to sit as a member of the Board of Regents of the Pamantasan ng Lungsod ng Maynila. In 2024, Galvante was also appointed by the Office of the President of the Philippines to be a board member of the Movie and Television Review and Classification Board (MTRCB).

== Early life and career ==
After graduating from the Pamantasan ng Lungsod ng Maynila, Galvante was employed as a production assistant at Radio Philippines Network.

She became a line producer in the 1970s and 1980s, on films such as Lino Brocka and Lupita Kashiwahara. She created the amateur singing contest Ang Bagong Kampeon (The New Champion).

Galvante was hired as Senior Vice President for entertainment at GMA Network in 1993. She has produced several dramas, including the Filipino adaptation of MariMar, Codename: Asero, and The Good Daughter.
