= Louie Ignacio =

Filipino director and painter

- Born: Luisito Lagdameo Ignacio; April 2, 1968 (age 57); Laguna, Philippines
- Occupations: Television director, Film director, Music video director, painter
- Employer: GMA Network

Luisito Lagdameo Ignacio (born April 2, 1968), professionally known as Louie Ignacio is a Filipino television director, film director, music video director, and painter. He studied AB Mass Communication in Centro Escolar University.

Ignacio also directs indie films including 2014 film Asintado which earned nominations in the International Filmmaker Festival of World Cinema and Gold Remi in the family/children's category on the 48th WorldFest Houston (Texas) International Film Festival, and Child Haus which won Best Child Film at the Dhaka International Film Festival in Bangladesh.

Ignacio is also a painter and displays exhibits of his works.

He is best known for directing GMA Network's defunct variety shows like SOP and Party Pilipinas, where he later resigned weeks after the latter's premiere. Ignacio is currently serving as the director of GMA programs such as TiktoClock, and The Clash.

== Filmography ==
=== Music video director ===
- Sharon Cuneta - Starlight
- Sarah Geronimo - Broken Vow (feat. Mark Bautista)
- Sarah Geronimo - Sa Iyo
- Jaya - Honesty
- Ogie Alcasid - Kung Mawawala ka
- Janno Gibbs & Jaya - Ikaw Lamang
- Janno Gibbs & Regine Velasquez - Evergreen
- Janno Gibbs & Pops Fernandez - I Say A Little Prayer
- Janno Gibbs & Pilita Corrales - Kapantay Ay Langit
- Nyoy Volante & Mannos - Nasaan
- Jolina Magdangal - Bahala Na
- La Diva - Kasiping Ka
- Jed Madela - Only Selfless Love (fea. Karylle)
- Ogie Alcasid - Huwag Ka Lang Mawawala
- Ogie Alcasid - Tanging Pag-Ibig
- Jonalyn "Jona" Viray - Close To Where You Are
- Lani Misalucha - Tila
- Jolina Magdangal - Let Me Be The One
- Rene Martinez - The Power to Unite (Read the Bible)
- Martin Nievera - Goodbye (feat. Pops Fernandez)
- Martin Nievera - Hanggang Kailan
- Martin Nievera - Only Selfless Love II
- Martin Nievera - Never Say Goodbye
- Ariel Rivera - Tell Me (feat. Regine Velasquez)
- Regine Velasquez - Hold Me In Your Arms
- Regine Velasquez - On the Wings of Love
- Regine Velasquez - For The Love Of You
- Regine Velasquez - One Love
- Regine Velasquez - Lost Without Your Love
- Regine Velasquez - In Your Eyes
- Regine Velasquez - Shine
- Regine Velasquez - My Miracle
- Regine Velasquez - Pangarap Ko Ang Ibigin Ka
- Regine Velasquez - Don't Go
- Regine Velasquez - To Reach You
- Regine Velasquez - Sa Aking Pag-Iisa
- Gary Valenciano - Everybody Get Down
- David Pomeranz - On This Day
- Pops Fernandez - You Take My Breath Away
- Regine Velasquez - Pangarap Ko'y Ikaw
- Voyz Avenue (now TAKEOFF) - Ulap
- Various Artists - Only Selfless Love
- Various Artists - Kapuso Anumang Kulay Ng Buhay (GMA Network's 2007 Station ID; co-directed by Paul Ticzon)
- Various Artists - Isang Kinabukasan
- Aryana & Buko Pie - Ako Ang Nauna (Bumati Ng Merry Christmas)
- Julie Anne San Jose - Right Where You Belong
- Gabby Eigenmann - Mahal Mo Rin Ako
- Alden Richards - Wish I May
- Rita Daniela - Hahanap Hanapin Ka
- Jessica Villarubin - Beautiful
- Rita Daniela - Umulan Man O Umaraw
- Jeric Gonzales - Hihintayin Kita (co-directed by Nathan Jacob Jesuitas)

=== TV Director ===
==== Shows ====
Year	Title	Network	Notes
2022–present	TiktoClock	GMA Network	Also the composer of its theme song performed by the program hosts Kim Atienza, Pokwang, and Rabiya Mateo with The Clash alumni Garrett Bolden (1st season finalist) and Jennie Gabriel (3rd season runner up).
2020–21	Centerstage	GMA Network	The show was postponed due to COVID-19 pandemic. It resumed on 2021 with a virtual set.
2020; 2021; 2022	All-Out Sundays	GMA Network	Shopee specials director (2020–22; uncredited) / Temporary show director (September 5–26, 2021)
2018–20; 2021–24	Sarap, 'Di Ba?	GMA Network	Studio director. When the COVID-19 pandemic started, Zoren Legaspi temporarily replaced him where the cast shoots in work-from-home format. Ignacio returns directing the show when the cast returned on studio.
2018–present	The Clash	GMA Network	6 seasons
2017	All-Star Videoke	GMA Network	
2017	Full House Tonight	GMA Network	
2016	Yan Ang Morning!	GMA Network	
2015–19	Sunday PinaSaya	GMA Network	Co-directed by Noel Cabacungan
2014	Marian	GMA Network	1st season only. He later left the show to direct for Miss World Philippines 2014 and replaced by Mark Reyes
2014–15	Basta Every Day Happy	GMA Network	
2013	Para sa 'Yo ang Laban Na Ito	GMA Network	
2012	Nay-1-1	GMA Network	
2011–12	Manny Many Prizes	GMA Network	
2011	Star Box	GMA Network	
2010	Love ni Mister, Love ni Misis	GMA Network	
2010	Party Pilipinas	GMA Network	The original director when it premiered on March 28 until he resigned on April 25, 2010. Before Rico Gutierrez and Mark Reyes were hired became the official replacements, The show's headwriter Rommel Gacho temporarily directed the show after Ignacio's resignation.
2009–15	Tropang Potchi	GMA Network	
?	Power to Unite	GMA Network	
2009	Are You The Next Big Star?	GMA Network	
2008	Songbird	GMA Network	
2008	Pinoy Idol	GMA Network	
2007–09	Celebrity Duets: Philippine Edition	GMA Network	
2004–2011	Mel and Joey	GMA Network	
2001–10	SiS	GMA Network	
1997–2010	SOP	GMA Network	
1996–97	GMA Supershow	GMA Network	
1995–2015	Startalk	GMA Network	

==== Drama ====
Year	Title	Network	Notes
2013	With A Smile	GMA Network	
2008	Ako si Kim Samsoon	GMA Network	Co-director, mainly directed by Dominic Zapata and co-directed by Khryss Adalia
2007	Boys Nxt Door	GMA Network	Mainly directed by Jun Lana
2007	My Only Love	GMA Network	
2006	I Luv NY	GMA Network	
2001–02	Ikaw Lang ang Mamahalin	GMA Network	Co-directed by Khryss Adalia and Soxie Topacio
2000	Munting Anghel	GMA Network	
2000	Umulan Man o Umaraw	GMA Network	

==== TV Specials ====
Year	Title	Network	Notes
2022	NCAA Season 98: Achieve Greatness Every Day: Opening Ceremony	GMA Network	
2022	NCAA Season 97: Stronger Together. Buo Ang Puso: Opening Ceremony	GMA Network	
2021	Paskong Pangarap: The 2021 GMA Christmas Special	GMA Network	featuring The Clash
2021	NCAA Season 96: Rise Up Stronger: Opening Ceremony	GMA Network	
2021	Lazada Super Party	GMA Network	
2020	The Clash Christmas Special: Pasko Para Sa Lahat	GMA Network	
2018	The Clash of 2018: Ang Concert Para Sa Lahat	GMA Network	
2014	Miss World Philippines 2014	GMA Network	
2013	One More Try: My Husband's Lover The Concert	GMA Network	My Husband's Lover concert special
2013	50 Years With The Master Showman	GMA Network	German Moreno's 50th anniversary tribute special
2012	Charice: One for the Heart	GMA Network	
2011	Miss World Philippines 2011	GMA Network	
2011	Charice: Home for Valentine's	GMA Network	
2010	GMA at 60: The Heart Of Television	GMA Network	GMA Network's 60th anniversary special
2009	Dantes Peak	GMA Network	Dingdong Dantes' 29th birthday special

=== Movie Director ===
Year	Title	Source
2024	Slay Zone	
2023	Litrato	
2023	AbeNida	
2023	Papa Mascot	
2023	An Affair to Forget	
2022	The Influencer	
2022	Broken Blooms	
2021	Huling Ulan sa Tag-Araw	
2018	School Service	
2018	Ngiti Ni Nazareno	
2018	Almost A Love Story	
2016	Area	
2016	Laut	
2015	Child Haus	
2014	Asintado	
2005	Lovestruck	
2004	Annie B.	
2003	Pangarap Ko Ang Ibigin Ka	

=== Television ===
- Starstruck (2004–2007) - Judge/Council (seasons 2–4)
- Eat Bulaga! (2023) - Judge for EB Fam Dancing Duo Double Double
