= Jewel Mische =

Filipino actress

- Born: Jewel Fatima Avejade Mische; 29 June 1990 (age 36); Manila, Philippines
- Occupations: Actress, model
- Years active: 2006–2016
- Agents: GMA Artist Center (2006–2010); Star Magic (2010–2014)
- Spouse: Alister Kurzer (m. 2015)
- Children: 3

Jewel Fatima Avejade Mische-Kurzer (born 29 June 1990) is a Filipino former model and actress.

== Biography ==
Although born in Manila Mische grew up in Bocaue, Bulacan. Her father is of Jordanian descent while her mother is Filipina. She and her siblings were legally adopted, which made them Mische. She studied at the University of the Philippines, Yokota Aviation (Flight School), and Cathedral of Praise Music and Bible College.

== Career ==
=== Starstruck ===
Mische won and was named as the Ultimate Sweetheart on GMA Network's talent reality search StarStruck. She gathered hundreds of thousands of votes, received Millions both in cash and exclusive management contract with GMA Network, Belgian waffle franchises, Calayan endorsement, and scholarships to Informatics. She also received a modeling contract with the Dutch Mill Yogurt Drink, followed by other major contracts.

=== After StarStruck ===
After winning StarStruck she started in various television guesting and shows. Named as one of the most beautiful stars in the Philippines (YES magazine, Showbiz Central, and Starmometer (3rd most beautiful Filipina in 2008), she has been featured in different magazines and modeled for several companies including the clothing line Hip Culture. She became part of the noontime variety show, SOP.

In 2007, she got her first acting job and lead role as Luming/Mina in an episode of the Sunday afternoon series Magic Kamison. She was then nominated at the 21st Star Awards for Television for Best New Female Personality for that series. After the said series, she got to play Madel in Mga Mata ni Anghelita, which was her first primetime series. Then she became a part of the cast in Mark Herras' Fantastic Man as Agent Vicky where she replaced the character of Valerie Concepcion which is Agent Belle, due to her transfer to another network.

She landed her first major role in a primetime series called Kamandag, where she played Jenny, which also starred Richard Gutierrez and Maxene Magalona. She is one of the celebrity endorsers of Brit London.

Mische became a Regal Films contract star.

Mother Lily Monteverde of Regal Entertainment signed her up to an eight-picture contract that started her being cast in an episode of the horror trilogy Shake, Rattle & Roll 9, entitled, Engkanto where she got to work, for the first time, with the artists of the rival network. She had a special participation in LaLola and as a host for TV series like the Filipino adaptation of America's Funniest Home Videos, Bitoy's Funniest Videos, among other programs.

=== Move to ABS-CBN ===
At the end of 2010, Mische moved to ABS-CBN after she ended her contract under GMA-7 and signed a two-year contract under ABS-CBN and manage by Star Magic. She is one of the Starstruck winners to move to the Kapamilya network, together with Starstruck Avengers Cristine Reyes, Tyron Perez and Nadine Samonte (season 1), Megan Young (season 2), (became Ms. World 2013), Johan Santos and Arci Muñoz (season 3), Paulo Avelino and Prince Stefan (season 4), and Piero Vergara (season 5).

Her first project as a Kapamilya was to be part of Maalaala Mo Kaya, entitled "Ice Cream". She landed her first primetime series in 100 Days to Heaven as Jessica Cruz. And she was chosen to be part of the Filipino adaptation of Mexican telenovela, Maria la del Barrio as Sabrina. Her most recent role was as a lead in Precious Hearts Romances Presents: Paraiso.

In 2015 she got married in Michigan.

== Filmography ==
=== Film ===
Year	Title	Role	Notes	Source
2007	Shake, Rattle and Roll 9	Tonee	Segment: "Engkanto"	

=== Television ===
Year	Title	Role	Notes
2006–2007	StarStruck: The Next Level	Herself/StarStruck Ultimate Sweetheart	Winner
2007	Startalk: Struck Attack	Herself/Co-host	Host
2007	SOP	Herself/Performer	Host
2007	Magic Kamison: Black Jewel in the Palace	Luming/Mina	
2007	Fantastic Man	Agent Vicky	Main Cast
2007	Mga Mata ni Anghelita	Madel	Main role
2007–2008	Carlo J. Caparas' Kamandag	Jenny	Main role
2008	LaLola	Ada Romina (Special Guest Role)	
2009	Dear Friend: Magkaribal	Cindy	Co-lead Cast
2010	Pilyang Kerubin	Rosalie Dela Cruz	Main role
2010–2013	ASAP	Herself	Herself
2011	Maalaala Mo Kaya: Ice Cream	Lory	
2011	Wansapanataym Presents: Rod Santiago's: Buhawi Jack	Vera Miranda	
2011	100 Days to Heaven	Jessica Cruz	Supporting role
2011–2012	Maria la del Barrio	Sabrina Villabrile	Co-lead role
2012	Wansapanataym: Amanda's Da Man	Adelle	
2012–2013	Precious Hearts Romances Presents: Paraiso	Megan Villareal	Lead role
2013	Maalaala Mo Kaya: Notebook	Anna	
2013	I Dare You Season 2	Herself/Celebrity Kakampi	
2014	The Buzz	Herself/Guest	
2016	Tonight with Boy Abunda	Herself/Guest	With Alex Kuzer

Awards and achievements
Preceded by Jackie Rice	StarStruck; 2006 (season 4)	Succeeded by Sarah Lahbati
