= Jesi Corcuera =

Fillipino actor

- Born: Jessica Corcuera
- Occupations: Actor; Vlogger
- Years active: 2006–present
- Agent: Sparkle GMA Artist Center (2006–2011)
- Children: 1

YouTube information
- Channel: Jesi Corcuera (corcuerajesi)
- Genre: vlogging
- Subscribers: 278,000
- Views: 18.7 million
- Last updated: February 2, 2026

Jesi Corcuera is a Filipino actor and vlogger who became the Averger of StarStruck: The Next Level. Corcuera was also a Ex Housemate of the Pinoy Big Brother: Lucky 7.

== Career ==
Corcuera began his career after appearing on the GMA Network reality talent show StarStruck in 2006. After being eliminated from the show, had won the Special Awards as The Best Taktak Award. he signed a contract with GMA and played various supporting roles for the network including in Boys Nxt Door, a youth-oriented situation comedy, in which Corcuera played Milo. This series premiered in 2007 and ran for 28 episodes. In 2008, he had roles in an afternoon series, Gaano Kadalas ang Minsan, and in 2010, he appeared in a supporting role in a series, Bantatay. after GMA For 5 years(2006-2011).

On November 5, 2016, Corcuera was introduced as a regular housemate of the seventh regular season of Pinoy Big Brother: Lucky 7, and was dubbed "Transman of the House ng Cavite". He evicted on December 9, 2016.

On March 9, 2017, Corcuera posted his first vlog, titled "RANDOM LAKAD with Thuy, Aura and Kuya Ome!"

== Personal life ==
In 2012, Jesi stepped away from showbusiness to focus on his gender transition and self-discovery. In 2013, he came out as a trans man.

On October 5, 2024, Corcuera announced on his Instagram account that he was expecting a child. He gave birth to a girl, Calia Elle, on December 11, 2024.

== Filmography ==
Year	Title	Role	Notes
2006–2007	StarStruck: The Next Level	Herself/Himself	
2007–2008	Boys Nxt Door	Milo	
2008	Gaano Kadalas ang Minsan	Raquel "Rocky" Perdigon	
2010–2011	Bantatay	Frankie	
2012	Nympho		
2016	Pinoy Big Brother: Lucky 7	Himself / Ex Housemate	
2019	Maalaala Mo Kaya	Billy	Episode: "Sinturon"
2022	Family Feud Philippines	Himself/Transman Pilipinas	
2024	Fast Talk with Boy Abunda	Himself	
2024	TiktoClock	Himself	
2024	Family Feud Philippines	Himself/Team Ninja	
