= StarStruck season 4 =

Season of a Philippine television reality show

StarStruck
- Season 4
- Title card 2006
- No. of episodes: 90

Release
- Original network: GMA Network
- Original release: December 4, 2006 – March 25, 2007

Season chronology
- ← Previous; Season 3 Next → Season 5

The fourth season of StarStruck, also known as StarStruck: The Next Level, is a Philippine television reality talent competition show, was broadcast on GMA Network. Hosted by Dingdong Dantes, Jolina Magdangal and Raymond Gutierrez, it premiered on December 4, 2006. The council was composed of Louie Ignacio, Lorna Tolentino and Douglas Quijano. The season ended with 91 episodes on March 25, 2007, having Jewel Mische, Aljur Abrenica, Kris Bernal and Mart Escudero as the Ultimate Survivors.

The series is streaming online on YouTube.

== Overview ==
The fourth season of StarStruck was formally announced the return of their reality-based talent show on September 3, 2006. GMA Network's variety program, SOP, where the hosts invited the age limit is set from 15 to 21 years old to audition for the upcoming season. Much of the auditions were held at the GMA Network's headquarters and at SM Supermalls throughout the Philippines.

The pilot episode was aired on December 4, 2006. The new improve edition of the popular show. The StarStruck is shown only weekdays having Fridays as elimination night, this season Mondays to Fridays will be tests and Sundays would be the elimination night. The show held its the Final Judgment on March 25, 2007, at the Marikina Sports Center in Marikina.

== Selection process ==
In the fourth year of the reality-talent search, Out of numerous who auditioned nationwide, only Top 100 was chosen for the first cut. From Top 100, it was trimmed down to Top 80, then from Top 80 to Top 40, These Top 40 dreamers (twenty males and twenty females) will undergo their first artista test, until only final twenty finalists will be left. Unlike the previous batches which launched the final fourteen finalists, these batches were trimmed down to twenty, dubbed as the final twenty finalists. The final twenty underwent various workshops and trainings in order to develop their personalities, talents, and charisma.

The Final 20 were reduced to the Circle 16, until they formed the Final 14 finalists. But, the twist is that every week, two hopefuls from the final fourteen may have to say goodbye and this time only six remain. Those who were eliminated were dubbed as StarStruck Avengers.

This time instead of the Final 4, this season made it the Final 6 will vie for the coveted for the new ultimate titles, the Ultimate Loveteam, the Ultimate Hunk and the Ultimate Sweetheart, both of them will received P1,000,000 pesos each plus and an exclusive management contract from GMA Network. Belgian Waffle franchises worth P250,000 pesos each and P50,00 pesos gift certificates to Manny Calayan, and scholarships to Informatics.

The First Prince and First Princess, both of them will received P250,000 pesos each plus and an exclusive management contract from the network. The StarStruck Avengers (the losing contestants) also received an exclusive contract from the network.

It also featured new ultimate titles in StarStruck History, the Ultimate Loveteam, the Ultimate Hunk and the Ultimate Sweetheart.

== Hopefuls ==
Then the number was narrowed down to Top 80 dreamers, Last Sunday night December 10, 2006. The TOP 80 hopefuls became TOP 40, TOP 20 females and TOP 20 males. These Top 40 hopefuls are now closer in their quest to become the final twenty finalists. In this season, hopefuls has a One on One session interview in the council was formed with Louie Ignacio, Lorna Tolentino and Douglas Quijano.

These Top 40 contestants will take their first talent test this week, and ten will be eliminated on Sunday, December 17, 2006. Ten additional contestants will be eliminated the following week on Sunday, December 24, 2006, leaving 20 finalists. For this season, 20 finalists will compete in various challenges, from which 14 finalists will advance.

When the Final 20 was chosen, they are assigned to different challenges every week that will hone their acting, singing, and dancing abilities. Every Sunday, two is meant to leave the competition until there were just eight others who are left. From danger eight, there will be two of them who will be eliminated and after the elimination the two; the final six will be revealed.

The Final 6 will be battling with each other on the Final Judgment. People will choose who they want to win the competition by online voting and text voting. 50% of the result will come from the online and text votes and the remaining 50% is from the council.

=== Avengers Strike's Back Twists ===
This season, the twist is that the avengers (losing contestants) of the fourth season will be the competitors of the survivors in the one week challenges.

The avengers competing with the remaining survivors are Lui Perez, Chariz Solomon, Jean de Castro, Chad Burden, Lizzy Pecson, Renee Lascuña, Hazel Uy, Dex Quindoza, Jan Manual and Rich Asuncion. Except, Kiko Junio and Dave Valentino did not attend on the first day of the avengers challenge, two were eliminated since there were ten avengers and only eight survivors. Those that were eliminated were Jean de Castro and Renee Lascuña.

At the end of the Survivors Versus Avengers week, four out of the eight avengers were eliminated and the other four were chosen to compete in the Danger 8 challenge week. The four that were eliminated: Lui Perez, Chariz Solomon, Chad Burden and Hazel Uy. The four that were chosen for the next weeks challenge were Lizzy Pecson, Dex Quindoza, Jan Manual and Rich Asuncion.

=== Danger Eight Twists ===
The end of the Survivors Versus Avengers week, four avengers out of the eight were chosen to continue competing in the show to have the right to join the remaining survivors. From the eight survivors, Mart Escudero and Jesi Corcuera were eliminated and were asked to join the avengers group to compete for the two Survivor Spots available that will complete the danger eight.

The avengers group consists of Lizzy Pecson, Dex Quindoza, Jan Manual, Rich Asuncion, Mart Escudero and Jesi Corcuera. Voting for the remaining survivors was temporarily closed and was opened for the six competing avengers. At the end of the week, Rich Asuncion and Mart Escudero were chosen for the two remaining survivor spots and thus completed the danger eight.

The Danger 8 are now consists of Jewel Mische, Kris Bernal, Rich Asuncion, Stef Prescott, Aljur Abrenica, Mart Escudero, Paulo Avelino and Prince Stefan.

Color key:

Male contestant
Female contestant
Semi-finalist
Finalist
Runner-up
Winner

Place	Contestant	Age	Hometown	Exit	Result
1	Jewel Mische	16	Bocaue, Bulacan	March 25, 2007	Ultimate Sweetheart
2	Aljur Abrenica	16	Angeles, Pampanga	March 25, 2007	Ultimate Hunk
3	Kris Bernal	17	Quezon City	March 25, 2007	Ultimate Loveteam
4	Mart Escudero	16	General Mariano Alvarez, Cavite	March 25, 2007	Ultimate Loveteam
5	Rich Asuncion	17	Tagbilaran, Bohol	March 25, 2007	First Princess
6	Prince Stefan	17	Iloilo City	March 25, 2007	First Prince
7	Stef Prescott	16	San Fernando, La Union	March 11, 2007	Avenger
8	Paulo Avelino	18	Baguio, Benguet	March 11, 2007	Avenger
9	Jesi Corcuera	16	Pasay	February 18, 2007	Avenger
10	Jan Manual	20	San Pedro, Laguna	February 4, 2007	Avenger
11	Dex Quindoza	17	Metro Manila	January 21, 2007	Avenger
12	Hazel Uy	19	Cebu City	January 21, 2007	Avenger
13	Renee Lascuña	17	Davao City	January 14, 2007	Avenger
14	Dave Valentino	20	Metro Manila	January 14, 2007	Avenger
15	Chad Burden	20	Cebu City	January 7, 2007	Avenger
16	Lizzy Pecson	19	San Fernando, Pampanga	January 7, 2007	Avenger
17	Jean de Castro	17	Mandaluyong	December 31, 2006	Avenger
18	Kiko Junio	16	San Fernando, Pampanga	December 31, 2006	Avenger
19	Lui Perez	21	South Cotabato	December 31, 2006	Avenger
20	Chariz Solomon	17	Pasay	December 31, 2006	Avenger
21	Jake Baste	19	Marikina	December 24, 2006	Top 30
22	Rox Beldua	19	Davao City	December 24, 2006	Top 30
23	Nica Escandor	16	Muntinlupa	December 24, 2006	Top 30
24	Kyle Esguerra	19	Metro Manila	December 24, 2006	Top 30
25	Jem Estrada	21	Marikina	December 24, 2006	Top 30
26	Ruji Fortuna	20	Laguna	December 24, 2006	Top 30
27	Ava Jugueta	17	Quezon Province	December 24, 2006	Top 30
28	Drey Peñol	17	Bulacan	December 24, 2006	Top 30
29	Don Perez	21	Cagayan de Oro	December 24, 2006	Top 30
30	Ayin Solomon	20	Nueva Ecija	December 24, 2006	Top 30
31	Amon Alcantara	17	Cebu City	December 17, 2006	Top 40
32	Lyka Ayuste	16	Davao City	December 17, 2006	Top 40
33	Amira Bartel	18	Sorsogon	December 17, 2006	Top 40
34	Tycoon Carreon	17	Iloilo City	December 17, 2006	Top 40
35	Karl Escober	21	Laguna	December 17, 2006	Top 40
36	Aldrin Gonzales	20	Cavite	December 17, 2006	Top 40
37	Rica Pijuan	19	Las Piñas	December 17, 2006	Top 40
38	Farina Runkle	17	Pasay	December 17, 2006	Top 40
39	Rando Stamatelaky	21	Pampanga	December 17, 2006	Top 40
40	Ann Tan	17	Laguna	December 17, 2006	Top 40

== Weekly Artista Tests ==
Color key:

Contestant with the Challenge Winner
Contestant was saved by the Public Vote and Council Vote
Contestant was in the Top 40 and Top 30
Contestant was in the Final 20
Contestant was in the Circle 16
Contestant was in the Final 14 and Survivor 6
Contestant was in the Bottom Group
Contestant was Eliminated
Contestant was advanced to the competition
Contestant was did not participated to the competition
Contestant with the Wild Card Winner
Contestant was the Runner-up
Contestant was the Winner

Week 1: The Top 40 hopefuls, were reduced to the Top 30 hopefuls.

  - Challenge Winner Contestant: Not Awarded

Contestant	Result
Amira Bartel	Eliminated
Ann Tan	Eliminated
Ava Jugueta	Top 30
Ayin Solomon	Top 30
Chariz Solomon	Top 30
Hazel Uy	Top 30
Farina Runkle	Eliminated
Jean de Castro	Top 30
Jem Estrada	Top 30
Jesi Corcuera	Top 30
Jewel Mische	Top 30
Kris Bernal	Top 30
Lizzy Pecson	Top 30
Lyka Ayuste	Eliminated
Nica Escandor	Top 30
Renee Lascuña	Top 30
Rica Pijuan	Eliminated
Rich Asuncion	Top 30
Rox Beldua	Top 30
Stef Prescott	Top 30

Contestant	Result
Aldrin Gonzales	Eliminated
Aljur Abrenica	Top 30
Amon Alcantara	Eliminated
Chad Burden	Top 30
Dave Valentino	Top 30
Dex Quindoza	Top 30
Don Perez	Top 30
Drey Peñol	Top 30
Jake Baste	Top 30
Jan Manual	Top 30
Karl Escober	Eliminated
Kyle Esguerra	Top 30
Kiko Junio	Top 30
Lui Perez	Top 30
Mart Escudero	Top 30
Paulo Avelino	Top 30
Prince Stefan	Top 30
Ruji Fortuna	Top 30
Rando Stamatelaky	Eliminated
Tycoon Carreon	Eliminated

Week 2: The Top 30 hopefuls, the official Final 20 hopefuls have been chosen.

  - Challenge Winner Contestant: Not Awarded

Contestant	Result
Ava Jugueta	Eliminated
Ayin Solomon	Eliminated
Chariz Solomon	Final 20
Hazel Uy	Final 20
Jean de Castro	Final 20
Jem Estrada	Eliminated
Jesi Corcuera	Final 20
Jewel Mische	Final 20
Kris Bernal	Final 20
Lizzy Pecson	Final 20
Nica Escandor	Eliminated
Renee Lascuña	Final 20
Rich Asuncion	Final 20
Rox Beldua	Eliminated
Stef Prescott	Final 20

Contestant	Result
Aljur Abrenica	Final 20
Chad Burden	Final 20
Dave Valentino	Final 20
Dex Quindoza	Final 20
Don Perez	Eliminated
Drey Peñol	Eliminated
Jake Baste	Eliminated
Jan Manual	Final 20
Kyle Esguerra	Eliminated
Kiko Junio	Final 20
Lui Perez	Final 20
Mart Escudero	Final 20
Paulo Avelino	Final 20
Prince Stefan	Final 20
Ruji Fortuna	Eliminated

Week 3: The Final 20 hopefuls, were reduced to the Circle 16 hopefuls.

  - Challenge Winner Contestant: Not Awarded

Contestant	Result
Chariz Solomon	Eliminated
Hazel Uy	Circle 16
Jean de Castro	Eliminated
Jesi Corcuera	Circle 16
Jewel Mische	Circle 16
Kris Bernal	Circle 16
Lizzy Pecson	Circle 16
Renee Lascuña	Circle 16
Rich Asuncion	Circle 16
Stef Prescott	Circle 16

Contestant	Result
Aljur Abrenica	Circle 16
Chad Burden	Circle 16
Dave Valentino	Circle 16
Dex Quindoza	Circle 16
Jan Manual	Circle 16
Kiko Junio	Eliminated
Lui Perez	Eliminated
Mart Escudero	Circle 16
Paulo Avelino	Circle 16
Prince Stefan	Circle 16

Week 4: The Circle 16 hopefuls, the official Final 14 hopefuls have been chosen.

  - Challenge Winner Contestant: Not Awarded

Contestant	Result
Hazel Uy	Final 14
Jesi Corcuera	Final 14
Jewel Mische	Final 14
Kris Bernal	Final 14
Lizzy Pecson	Eliminated
Renee Lascuña	Final 14
Rich Asuncion	Final 14
Stef Prescott	Final 14

Contestant	Result
Aljur Abrenica	Final 14
Chad Burden	Eliminated
Dave Valentino	Final 14
Dex Quindoza	Final 14
Jan Manual	Final 14
Mart Escudero	Final 14
Paulo Avelino	Final 14
Prince Stefan	Final 14

Week 5: The Final 14 hopefuls.

  - Challenge Winner Contestant: Not Awarded

Contestant	Result
Hazel Uy	Safe
Jesi Corcuera	Safe
Jewel Mische	Bottom 4
Kris Bernal	Safe
Renee Lascuña	Eliminated
Rich Asuncion	Safe
Stef Prescott	Safe

Contestant	Result
Aljur Abrenica	Safe
Dave Valentino	Eliminated
Dex Quindoza	Safe
Jan Manual	Safe
Mart Escudero	Safe
Paulo Avelino	Bottom 4
Prince Stefan	Safe

Week 6: The Final 12 hopefuls.

Contestant	Result
Hazel Uy	Eliminated
Jesi Corcuera	Bottom 6
Jewel Mische	Safe
Kris Bernal	Bottom 6
Rich Asuncion	Challenge Winner
Stef Prescott	Challenge Winner

Contestant	Result
Aljur Abrenica	Bottom 6
Dex Quindoza	Eliminated
Jan Manual	Challenge Winner
Mart Escudero	Safe
Paulo Avelino	Challenge Winner
Prince Stefan	Bottom 6

Week 7: The Final 10 hopefuls.

  - Challenge Winner Contestant: Not Awarded
  - Eliminated Contestant: None

Contestant	Result
Jesi Corcuera	Bottom 5
Jewel Mische	Safe
Kris Bernal	Safe
Rich Asuncion	Safe
Stef Prescott	Bottom 5

Contestant	Result
Aljur Abrenica	Safe
Jan Manual	Bottom 5
Mart Escudero	Bottom 5
Paulo Avelino	Safe
Prince Stefan	Bottom 5

Week 8: The Final 10 hopefuls.

  - Challenge Winner Contestant: Not Awarded

Contestant	Result
Jesi Corcuera	Safe
Jewel Mische	Safe
Kris Bernal	Safe
Rich Asuncion	Eliminated
Stef Prescott	Bottom 5

Contestant	Result
Aljur Abrenica	Safe
Jan Manual	Eliminated
Mart Escudero	Bottom 5
Paulo Avelino	Safe
Prince Stefan	Bottom 5

Week 9: The Final 8 hopefuls. First week of The Avengers Strike's Back Twsits.

  - Challenge Winner Contestant: Not Awarded
  - Bottom Group Contestant: None
  - Eliminated Contestant: None

Contestant	Result
Jesi Corcuera	Safe
Jewel Mische	Safe
Kris Bernal	Safe
Stef Prescott	Safe

Contestant	Result
Aljur Abrenica	Safe
Mart Escudero	Safe
Paulo Avelino	Safe
Prince Stefan	Safe

  - Avengers Strike's Back Twists

Contestant	Result
Chariz Solomon	Advanced
Hazel Uy	Advanced
Jean de Castro	Advanced
Lizzy Pecson	Advanced
Renee Lascuña	Advanced
Rich Asuncion	Advanced

Contestant	Result
Chad Burden	Advanced
Dave Valentino	Did Not Participated
Dex Quindoza	Advanced
Jan Manual	Advanced
Kiko Junio	Did Not Participated
Lui Perez	Advanced

Week 10: The Final 8 hopefuls. Second week of The Avengers Strike's Back Twsits.

  - Challenge Winner Contestant: Not Awarded

Contestant	Result
Jesi Corcuera	Eliminated
Jewel Mische	Safe
Kris Bernal	Safe
Stef Prescott	Bottom 4

Contestant	Result
Aljur Abrenica	Safe
Mart Escudero	Eliminated
Paulo Avelino	Bottom 4
Prince Stefan	Safe

  - Avengers Strike's Back Twists

Contestant	Result
Chariz Solomon	Eliminated
Hazel Uy	Eliminated
Jean de Castro	Eliminated
Jesi Corcuera	Advanced
Lizzy Pecson	Advanced
Renee Lascuña	Eliminated
Rich Asuncion	Advanced

Contestant	Result
Chad Burden	Eliminated
Dex Quindoza	Advanced
Jan Manual	Advanced
Lui Perez	Eliminated
Mart Escudero	Advanced

Week 11: The Danger 8 hopefuls. Third week of The Avengers Strike's Back Twists.

  - Bottom Group Contestant: None
  - Eliminated Contestant: None

Contestant	Result
Jewel Mische	Safe
Kris Bernal	Challenge Winner
Stef Prescott	Safe

Contestant	Result
Aljur Abrenica	Challenge Winner
Paulo Avelino	Safe
Prince Stefan	Safe

  - Avengers Strike's Back Twists

Contestant	Result
Jesi Corcuera	Eliminated
Lizzy Pecson	Eliminated
Rich Asuncion	Strike's Back

Contestant	Result
Dex Quindoza	Eliminated
Jan Manual	Eliminated
Mart Escudero	Strike's Back

  - Danger 8 Twists

Contestant	Result
Jewel Mische	Danger 8
Kris Bernal	Danger 8
Rich Asuncion	Wild Card
Stef Prescott	Danger 8

Contestant	Result
Aljur Abrenica	Danger 8
Mart Escudero	Wild Card
Paulo Avelino	Danger 8
Prince Stefan	Danger 8

Week 12-13: The Danger 8 hopefuls.

  - Challenge Winner Contestant: Not Awarded

Contestant	Result
Jewel Mische	Survivor 6
Kris Bernal	Survivor 6
Rich Asuncion	Survivor 6
Stef Prescott	Eliminated

Contestant	Result
Aljur Abrenica	Survivor 6
Mart Escudero	Survivor 6
Paulo Avelino	Eliminated
Prince Stefan	Survivor 6

Week 14: The Survivor 6 Homecoming

Contestant	Result
Jewel Mische	Advanced
Kris Bernal	Advanced
Rich Asuncion	Advanced

Contestant	Result
Aljur Abrenica	Advanced
Mart Escudero	Advanced
Prince Stefan	Advanced

Week 15: The Final Judgment, the Ultimate Survivors have been proclaimed.

Contestant	Result
Jewel Mische	Ultimate Sweetheart
Kris Bernal	Ultimate Loveteam
Rich Asuncion	First Princess

Contestant	Result
Aljur Abrenica	Ultimate Hunk
Mart Escudero	Ultimate Loveteam
Prince Stefan	First Prince

== Final judgment ==
The winner was announced on a two-hour TV special dubbed as StarStruck The Next Level: The Final Judgment was held live on March 25, 2007, at the Marikina Sports Center once again. StarStruck fans filled the Marikina Sports Center to capacity to witness the show's final judgment, which was hosted by Dingdong Dantes, Jolina Magdangal, and Raymond Gutierrez. A filled Marikina Sports Center was witness to the much-awaited event.

The final six the opening number performance song and dance by Destiny Child’s "Say My Name". Aside from being the final judgment, it was a celebration of the highly successful artista search and involved special performances from the graduates, both survivors and avengers a dance number performance song of DJ Webstar's "Chicken Noodle Soup".

The council are composed of Louie Ignacio, Lorna Tolentino and Douglas Quijano was joined by GMA-7's senior vice-president for entertainment-TV Wilma Galvante and GMA Films president Anette Gozon-Abrogar (both not pictured) for the final judgment night.

The avengers’ performance came in next, in a song and dance medley detailing the journey of the survivors from the audition process, until the introduction of the final twenty, the eight International contenders and the elimination of the fourteen avengers for a dance number.

The final six then performed their own dance numbers the male survivors, Aljur Abrenica sang and dance by a song of Blue’s "Best In Me", Mart Escudero a dance number by a song of Aligator Project’s "Stomp", Hip-Hop Dance Remix performing a solo dance number with the Manoeuvres and Prince Stefan a dance number by a song of ?’s "?", Perform a solo dance number with the Manoeuvres and next the female survivors, Jewel Mische a dance number by a song of Tata Young’s "El Nin-Yo", Perform a solo dance number with the Manoeuvres, Kris Bernal a dance number by a song of ?’s "?", Perform a solo dance number with the Manoeuvres and Rich Asuncion a dance number by a song of Jennifer Hudson’s featuring Beyonce "One Night Only", Perform a solo dance number with the Manoeuvres.

Other awards honoured that night were Jan Manual for Dats Entertaining Award, Dex Quindoza for male with The Most Dramatic Exit, Stef Prescott for female with The Most Dramatic Exit, and Jesi Corcuera for The Best Taktak Award.

Before the top winners were announced, Regine Velasquez performed by the songs of Michael Bolton’s "Go The Distance", Mariah Carey’s "Can’t Take That Away", Carrie Underwood’s "Jesus, Take The Wheel", Mariah Carey’s "Never Too Far" and "Through The Rain", Patti La Belle’s "There’s A Winner In You", and Jekyll & Hyde’s "This Is The Moment", for the remaining six contenders, while pre-taped played on a big screen of them thanking their supporters.

Announcement come, Mart Escudero of General Mariano Alvarez, Cavite got 267,703 votes, and Kris Bernal of Quezon City got 177,600 votes, they are the Ultimate Loveteam, Aljur Abrenica of Angeles, Pampanga got 280,084 votes, is the Ultimate Hunk and Jewel Mische of Bocaue, Bulacan got 157,618 votes, is the Ultimate Sweetheart were proclaimed as the Ultimate Survivors, all four winners both received P1,000,000 pesos each plus and an exclusive management contract from GMA Network worth P2,000,000 pesos each, Belgian Waffle franchises worth P250,000 pesos each, P50,00 gift certificates to Manny Calayan, and Scholarships to Informatics.

The winners will be included in the youth-oriented show Boys Nxt Door except Jewel Mische. The Ultimate Hunk and Ultimate Sweetheart will be part of a separate GMA teledrama and The Ultimate Loveteam will be introduced in a Regal Films movie with Judy Ann Santos and Dennis Trillo which is Mag-ingat Ka sa Kulam.

While, Prince Stefan of Iloilo City got 193,503 votes, is the First Prince and Rich Asuncion of Tagbilaran, Bohol got 151,981 votes, is the First Princess were proclaimed the Runners-up, each of them received P250,000 pesos each plus and an exclusive management contract from the network. The StarStruck Avengers (the losing contestants) also received an exclusive contract from the network.

Thus, Kris Bernal and Aljur Abrenica received the Texter's Choice awards giving them both commercial endorsements for BNY. Jewel Mische will also receive a modelling contract with the Dutch Mill Yogurt Drink because she wins the title Ultimate Sweetheart. The Final Judgment gained 24.1% rating; relatively high as the finale finished very late, reaching until 1:15 the following morning, but the ratings that they gained that very night was more than enough to beat their rival show that very night.

== TV assignment ==
For their first TV assignment, the survivor six Aljur Abrenica, Kris Bernal, Mart Escudero and Rich Asuncion except Jewel Mische and Prince Stefan with the avengers Paulo Avelino, Stef Prescott, Jesi Corcuera, Jan Manual and Kiko Junio for upcoming cast of the youth-oriented show Boys Nxt Door. They co-starred with the StarStruck alumna Marky Cielo, Mark Herras, Sheena Halili and Ailyn Luna.

== Signature dances ==
There are signature dances and songs made in each batch. With this batch, their signature dances and songs are:

- Fergalicious
- Mosquito
- Itaktak Mo
- El Nin-YO

== Elimination chart ==
Color key:

Male contestant
Female contestant
Semi-finalist
Final 20
Circle 16
Final 14 and Survivor 6
Challenge Winner
Safe
Bottom Group
Eliminated
Advanced
Did Not Participated
Wild Card
Finalist
Runner-up
Winner

Results per public and council votes
Place	Contestant	Top 40 (Week 1)	Top 30 (Week 2)	Top 20 (Week 3)	Top 16 (Week 4)	Top 14 (Week 5)	Top 12 (Week 6)	Top 10 (Week 7–8)		Top 8 (Week 9–13)					Top 6 (Week 14–15)	
Place	Contestant	12/17/06 ^{1}	12/24/06 ^{1}	12/31/06 ^{2}	1/7/07	1/14/07	1/21/07	1/28/07 ^{3}	2/4/07 ^{3}	2/11/07 ^{4}	2/18/07 ^{4}	2/25/07 ^{5}	3/4/07 ^{6}	3/11/07 ^{7}	3/18/07	3/25/07 ^{8}
1–6	Jewel Mische	Top 30	Final 20	Circle 16	Final 14	Bottom 4	Safe	Safe	Safe	Safe	Safe	Safe	Bottom 8	Survivor 6	Advanced	Ultimate Sweetheart
1–6	Aljur Abrenica	Top 30	Final 20	Circle 16	Final 14	Safe	Bottom 6	Safe	Safe	Safe	Safe	Challenge Winner	Bottom 8	Survivor 6	Advanced	Ultimate Hunk
1–6	Kris Bernal	Top 30	Final 20	Circle 16	Final 14	Safe	Bottom 6	Safe	Safe	Safe	Safe	Challenge Winner	Bottom 8	Survivor 6	Advanced	Ultimate Loveteam
1–6	Mart Escudero	Top 30	Final 20	Circle 16	Final 14	Safe	Safe	Bottom 5	Bottom 5	Safe	Eliminated Advanced	Wild Card	Bottom 8	Survivor 6	Advanced	Ultimate Loveteam
1–6	Rich Asuncion	Top 30	Final 20	Circle 16	Final 14	Safe	Challenge Winner	Safe	Eliminated	Advanced	Advanced	Wild Card	Bottom 8	Survivor 6	Advanced	First Princess
1–6	Prince Stefan	Top 30	Final 20	Circle 16	Final 14	Safe	Bottom 6	Bottom 5	Safe	Safe	Safe	Safe	Bottom 8	Survivor 6	Advanced	First Prince
7–8	Stef Prescott	Top 30	Final 20	Circle 16	Final 14	Safe	Challenge Winner	Bottom 5	Bottom 5	Safe	Bottom 4	Safe	Bottom 8	Eliminated		Avenger
7–8	Paulo Avelino	Top 30	Final 20	Circle 16	Final 14	Bottom 4	Challenge Winner	Safe	Bottom 5	Safe	Bottom 4	Safe	Bottom 8	Eliminated		Avenger
9	Jesi Corcuera	Top 30	Final 20	Circle 16	Final 14	Safe	Bottom 6	Bottom 5	Safe	Safe	Eliminated Advanced	Eliminated				Avenger
10	Jan Manual	Top 30	Final 20	Circle 16	Final 14	Safe	Challenge Winner	Bottom 5	Eliminated	Advanced	Advanced	Eliminated				Avenger
11–12	Dex Quindoza	Top 30	Final 20	Circle 16	Final 14	Safe	Eliminated			Advanced	Eliminated					Avenger
11–12	Hazel Uy	Top 30	Final 20	Circle 16	Final 14	Safe	Eliminated			Advanced	Eliminated					Avenger
13–14	Renee Lascuña	Top 30	Final 20	Circle 16	Final 14	Eliminated				Advanced	Eliminated					Avenger
13–14	Dave Valentino	Top 30	Final 20	Circle 16	Final 14	Eliminated				Did Not Participated						Avenger
15–16	Chad Burden	Top 30	Final 20	Circle 16	Eliminated					Advanced	Eliminated					Avenger
15–16	Lizzy Pecson	Top 30	Final 20	Circle 16	Eliminated					Advanced	Advanced	Advanced Eliminated^{4}				Avenger
17–20	Jean de Castro	Top 30	Final 20	Eliminated						Advanced	Eliminated					Avenger
17–20	Kiko Junio	Top 30	Final 20	Eliminated						Did Not Participated						Avenger
17–20	Lui Perez	Top 30	Final 20	Eliminated						Advanced	Eliminated					Avenger
17–20	Chariz Solomon	Top 30	Final 20	Eliminated						Advanced	Eliminated					Avenger
21–30	Jake Baste	Top 30	Eliminated													Top 30
21–30	Rox Beldua	Top 30	Eliminated													Top 30
21–30	Nica Escandor	Top 30	Eliminated													Top 30
21–30	Kyle Esguerra	Top 30	Eliminated													Top 30
21–30	Jem Estrada	Top 30	Eliminated													Top 30
21–30	Ruji Fortuna	Top 30	Eliminated													Top 30
21–30	Ava Jugueta	Top 30	Eliminated													Top 30
21–30	Drey Peñol	Top 30	Eliminated													Top 30
21–30	Don Perez	Top 30	Eliminated													Top 30
21–30	Ayin Solomon	Top 30	Eliminated													Top 30
31–40	Amon Alcantara	Eliminated														Top 40
31–40	Lyka Ayuste	Eliminated														Top 40
31–40	Amira Bartel	Eliminated														Top 40
31–40	Tycoon Carreon	Eliminated														Top 40
31–40	Karl Escober	Eliminated														Top 40
31–40	Aldrin Gonzales	Eliminated														Top 40
31–40	Rica Pijuan	Eliminated														Top 40
31–40	Farina Runkle	Eliminated														Top 40
31–40	Rando Stamatelaky	Eliminated														Top 40
31–40	Ann Tan	Eliminated														Top 40

=== Notes ===
1. These Top 40 dreamers will undergo their first artista test this week and ten hopefuls of them will be eliminated next Sunday, December 17, 2006. After which, second artista test and ten hopefuls more will be eliminated next Sunday, December 24, 2006, the following week, until only final twenty survivors will be left.
2. The four survivors were eliminated from the first week. They are Kiko Junio, Lui Perez, Chariz Solomon and Jean de Castro. The two survivors were eliminated from the second week to complete the final fourteen. They are Chad Burden and Lizzy Pecson.
3. It was a non-elimination week. The bottom group are Jan Manual, Jesi Corcuera, Mart Escudero, Stef Prescott and Prince Stefan was safe for the elimination on January 28, 2007.
4. The week ending February 11, 2007, includes The avengers strike back twist while the week ending February 25, 2007, includes The danger eight twist. In the avengers strike back twist, all avengers from the Top 20 and Top 14 returned Chariz Solomon, Chad Burden, Jean de Castro, Lui Perez, Lizzy Pecson, Renee Lascuña, Hazel Uy, Dex Quindoza, Jan Manual, Rich Asuncion and followed by Jesi Corcuera and Mart Escudero. Except, for Kiko Junio and Dave Valentino where four will be chosen for the danger eight twist. Out of all the avengers who didn't make it in the final fourteen, Lizzy Pecson is the only one who advanced in the danger eight twist. However, she failed to advance in this round.
5. At the end of the week, Mart Escudero and Rich Asuncion were chosen for the two remaining survivor spots and thus completed the danger eight.
6. It was a non-elimination week. The bottom group are the remaining danger eight, was safe for the elimination on March 3, 2007.
7. The final six was chosen on March 11, 2007. And the last avengers are Paulo Avelino and Stef Prescott. The first called to eliminated is Paulo Avelino and the second called is Stef Prescott.
8. In the final judgment night, Jewel Mische, Aljur Abrenica, Kris Bernal and Mart Escudero were proclaimed as the Ultimate Survivors.
