= Rich Asuncion =

Filipino actress

- Born: Richell Pacaldo Angalot; January 22, 1989 (age 37); Tagbilaran, Bohol, Philippines
- Occupations: Actress, model
- Years active: 2006–2021; 2023
- Agent: GMA Artist Center (2006–2023)
- Height: 5 ft 8 in (1.73 m)
- Spouse: Benjamin Mudie (m. 2018)
- Children: 2

Richell Pacaldo Angalot-Mudie (born January 22, 1989), known professionally as Rich Asuncion, is a Filipino actress who became the First Princess of StarStruck: The Next Level. Asuncion was also First Runner-up of Binibining Pilipinas 2009.

== Biography and career ==
Richell Pacaldo Angalot, the eldest child of Richard Angalot and Melinda Pacaldo of Bool District, Tagbilaran City, Richell was 15 years old when she first joined a beauty pageant representing Tagbilaran City Schools Division in the Miss Central Visayas Regional Athletic Association (CVRAA) 2004 in Danao, Cebu. She won third runner-up, Miss Talent and the Best in Fun Wear trophies. She was one of the sagalas of the Santacruzan 2004 and was chosen muse of Bohol Lions during the Lions District Convention in 2004. Later that year, Asuncion was declared Female Grand Champion in Island City Mall's Campus Discovery Model Quest 2004. In September 2007, Rich Asuncion became a Regal Entertainment contract star. She married Benjamin Mudie in May 2018 in Hong Kong.

== Binibining Pilipinas 2009 ==
Asuncion March 7, 2009, at the Araneta Coliseum. She was Candidate No. 3. From the original applicants (numbering over 170), only 36 were asked to return. The final 24 were decided after the contestants underwent gruelling hours of pressure and tension at the Mandarin Suites on the fifth of February.

== Filmography ==
=== Film ===
Year	Title	Role
2009	Tarot	Teen Nana Uping
2010	Rekrut	
2011	Babang Luksa	Melissa
2013	Lauriana	
2013	Morgue	
2014	Kubot: The Aswang Chronicles 2	
2015	Manila's Finest	Mylene de Dios
2019	Children of the River	Elvy

=== Television ===
Year	Title	Role
2006–2007	StarStruck: The Next Level	Contestant
2007–2008	Maynila	Various
2007–2008	Boys Nxt Door	Winona
2007–2008	Kamandag	Ryza
2008	Sine Novela: Magdusa Ka	Violy
2008	Dear Friend	Jane
2008	LaLola	Nina
2009	Gagambino	Ada's friend
2009	Sine Novela: Kung Aagawin Mo ang Lahat sa Akin	Joyce Delos Santos
2009	Bulong ng Puso	Andrea Montalban
2009	Full House	Lizzy
2010	Carlo J. Caparas' Panday Kids	Fatima
2010	Love Bug Presents: Wish Come True	Isabel
2010	Beauty Queen	Reigning BB. Isla Pilipinas' Titleholder
2010–2011	Little Star	Bianca Valerio
2011	Untold Stories Mula Sa Face to Face: Kapag Umibig Ang Batang Tondo	Allysa Mendoza
2011	Sisid	Frida
2011–2012	Kung Aagawin Mo ang Langit	Nadia
2012	Biritera	Josephine "Jo" Abesamis
2012–2013	Aso ni San Roque	Bernice Montemayor
2013	Binoy Henyo	Teacher Josie
2013	Magpakailanman: Lubog sa putik	Linda
2013	Wagas: Cherrie and Victor Love Story	Cherrie
2013	Magpakailanman: School Bullying Caught on Cam	Ate
2013	Pyra: Babaeng Apoy	Anna
2014	Kambal Sirena	Betilya
2014	Magpakailanman: Ang huling dasal ng isang ina	Vivian
2014–2015	Yagit	Odette Montecillo
2015	Magpakailanman: Sa Ngalan ng Pagmamahal	Roselle
2015	Magpakailanman: Hakbang Tungo sa Pangarap	Evelyn
2015	Magpakailanman: My Teacher, My Rapist	Leny
2015	Let the Love Begin	Melissia Magtanggol-Potenciano
2015	My Faithful Husband	Soling
2015	Maynila: Sisters for Life	Sarah
2015	Little Nanay	Ma'am Janet
2016	Karelasyon: Gold Digger	Sheila's sister
2016	Magpakailanman: Tamang Pag-ibig sa Maling Panahon	Eva
2016	Wish I May	Sally Pizarro
2016	The Millionaire's Wife	Rosario "Rio" Samson
2016	Sinungaling Mong Puso	Sophia Paragas-Aguirre
2016	Magpakailanman: Sa Malas at Swerte	Rostini
2016–2018	Ika-6 na Utos	Flor Garcia-Trinidad
2017	Magpakailanman: The Justice for the Battered Child	Sarah Jane
2018	Tadhana: Secret Affair	Gigi
2019	Inagaw na Bituin	Kaye
2019	Dahil sa Pag-ibig	Joanna Paredes
2020	Descendants of the Sun	Janet Pagsisihan†
2023	Imbestigador	Nina

== Awards and nominations ==
Year	Critics/Contests	Result
2007	StarStruck: The Next Level Final Judgement	First Princess
2008	FHM's 100 Sexiest women of the world	94 slot
2009	Bb. Pilipinas 2009	Ms. Natasha Girl
2009	Bb. Pilipinas 2009	Araneta Shoppers' Bet
2009	Bb. Pilipinas 2009	Ms. Talent
2009	Bb. Pilipinas 2009	1st Runner Up

Awards and achievements
Preceded by Iwa Moto	StarStruck; Runner-up; 2006 (season 4)	Succeeded by Diva Montelaba
