= Working Beks =

2016 film directed by Chris Martinez

- Theatrical release poster
- Directed by: Chris Martinez
- Screenplay by: Chris Martinez
- Produced by: Veronique Del Rosario-Corpus; Vincent Del Rosario III
- Starring: John Lapus; TJ Trinidad; Joey Paras; Edgar Allan Guzman; Prince Stefan
- Cinematography: Gary Gardoce
- Edited by: Vanessa De Leon
- Music by: Jesse Lucas
- Production company: Viva Films
- Distributed by: Viva Films
- Release date: November 23, 2016
- Running time: 112 minutes
- Country: Philippines
- Language: Filipino

Working Beks is a 2016 Philippine comedy drama film written and directed by Chris Martinez. It stars John Lapus, TJ Trinidad, Edgar Allan Guzman, Joey Paras and Prince Stefan. The film is about five gay men from different walks of life are confronted with important choices that could change everything for them.

== Plot ==
The film follows five gay men whose lives intersect over the course of a single day as they each confront major decisions regarding their careers, relationships, health, and finances.

Tommy (Trinidad), a well-liked Marketing Director on the brink of being promoted to Senior VP, faces a career setback when the promotion is unexpectedly given to someone else. Feeling betrayed, he must decide whether to accept the decision quietly or challenge the system that overlooked him. Driven by frustration, Tommy chooses to fight for what he believes he deserves, risking his family's trust and everything he holds dear in the process.

Gorgeous (Lapus), the primary breadwinner for his family, struggles with financial and emotional pressures. His mother demands constant financial support, even for distant relatives. The situation worsens when his estranged, abusive father returns, and his mother readily welcomes him back. Trapped in familial expectations, Gorgeous finds solace in his obsession with matinee idol Champ. As the day progresses, Gorgeous must choose between hiding behind his idolization or confronting the toxic family dynamics to take control of his life.

Champ (Guzman), a heartthrob actor, faces a career-threatening scandal after a video of him kissing another man goes viral, sparking rumors about his sexuality. With his career and endorsements at stake, he hides away, torn between maintaining his public image or coming out and revealing his truth. As he prepares for a live primetime interview, Champ must decide whether honesty is worth risking everything he has built or if preserving his career and reputation is more important than being true to himself.

On his wedding day, Mandy (Paras) faces a personal crisis as he grapples with resurfacing feelings for men. Despite his fiancée's understanding, Mandy is torn between fulfilling his commitment or embracing a new chapter of his life. His decision could redefine his sense of self and his place in the world, risking the love and stability he has built with his fiancée.

Jet (Stefan), a promiscuous call center agent, experiences a paralyzing anxiety attack after learning that a recent hookup has committed suicide following an HIV diagnosis. Consumed by guilt and fear, Jet is forced to confront his reckless behavior and its consequences. In a moment of deep reflection, he realizes he must get tested for sexually transmitted diseases. However, the emotional weight of his past choices threatens to overwhelm him. He must decide whether to face his fears and take responsibility or continue living in denial.

Each character faces a pivotal choice with far-reaching consequences. Their decisions intersect, revealing the interconnectedness of their lives and leading them to confront their true selves, desires, and sacrifices needed for their future. By day's end, some find redemption while others face harsh realities, but their lives are irrevocably changed.

== Cast ==
- John Lapus as Gorgeous
- TJ Trinidad as Tommy
- Joey Paras as Mandy
- Edgar Allan Guzman as Champ
- Prince Stefan as Jet
- Bela Padilla as Joy
- Marlon Rivera as HMQ
- Ricci Chan as Annabelle
- Raquel Villavicencio as Mommy Pearl
- Leo Martinez as Mr. Ted
- Arnold Reyes as George
- Johnny Revilla as Orly
- Tess Antonio as Lorna
- Jeric Raval as Gardo
- Patricia Ismael as Annie
- Madeleine Nicolas as Glo
- Rez Cortez as Gusting
- Cai Cortez as Judith
- Geraldine Villamil as Nurse Betty
- Atak as Brother Benj
- Lao Rodriguez as Champ's Stylist
- Kiki Baento as Jet's Supervisor
- Andres Vasquez as Jonjon
- Jelson Bay as Talkshow Host 1
- Ana Abad Santos as Talkshow Host 2
- Dennis Marasigan as Priest
- Hailey Lim as Nicole
- Elijah Alejo as Sasa
- Ianne Oandasan as Jeannie
- Franco Nerona as Hershey
- Ejay Fontanilla as Glamteam
- Brilliant Juan as Glamteam
- Jhunee Alfonso as Glamteam
- Christian Canales as Nurse

== Release ==
The film was released on November 23, 2016.

== Reception ==
Philbert Dy of ClickTheCity.com gave the film negative reviews and wrote:

"The whole thing seems to be about getting to certain scenes without having to do the work of building to them."

Oggz Cruz of Rappler gave the film a positive review and he wrote:

"even in its loudest and most uneven moments, echoes sentiments that deserve to be expressed and heard. Martinez knows that the best way to say what needs to be said is to package them in a product that is accessible, even if it reinforces stereotypes of gays that mainstream media has exploited for profit."

== Soundtrack ==
- We're the Beks

Composed by Thyro Alfaro Produced by Civ Fontanilla Arranged by Thyro Alfaro Performed by John Lapus, TJ Trinidad, Joey Paras, Edgar Allan Guzman, and Prince Stefan
