= Magic Kamison =

2007 Philippine television drama series

- Title card
- Genre: Fantasy drama
- Starring: Gladys Guevarra
- Country of origin: Philippines
- Original language: Tagalog
- No. of episodes: 19

Production
- Executive producer: Lian Garcia
- Camera setup: Multiple-camera setup
- Running time: 23–40 minutes
- Production company: GMA Entertainment TV

Original release
- Network: GMA Network
- Release: February 4 – June 17, 2007

Magic Kamison (transl. magic chemise) is a 2007 Philippine television drama fantasy anthology series broadcast by GMA Network. Starring Gladys Guevarra, it premiered on February 4, 2007. The series concluded on June 17, 2007, with a total of 19 episodes.

The series is streaming online on YouTube.

== Cast and characters ==
- Gladys Guevarra as Chuchay Panyurutan
- Pilita Corrales as the voice of Magic Kamison
- Tiya Pusit as Chang

The True Lindsay

- Iwa Moto as Lindsay / Laura
- Nadine Samonte as Ava
- Alfred Vargas as Jaren
- Carmi Martin
- Tiya Pusit
- Joy Viado as Agnes
- Mike Gayoso
- Kirby de Jesus

Little Big Rufo

- Dingdong Dantes as Rudy
- Karylle as Rianne
- Mura as Rufo
- Yayo Aguila
- Girlie Sevilla
- Vangie Labalan as Epang
- Biboy Ramirez
- Marcus Madrigal
- Matthew Torres

My Ghost Bride

- LJ Reyes as Misty
- JC de Vera as Adrian
- Sunshine Garcia as Lizet
- Kris Martinez
- Benjie Paras as Pancho
- Beverly Salviejo
- Goyong as Itoy
- Neil Ferrera

Black Jewel in da Palace

- Jewel Mische as Luming/Mina
- Paulo Avelino as Poy
- Chuck Allie as Charlie
- Dion Ignacio as Aloy
- German Moreno as Vino
- Chanda Romero
- Tuesday Vargas as Sutla
- Ella V as Patty
- Dang Cruz
- Hero Bautista as Whitey
- Gilette Sandico
- Jessica Reynoso

== Accolades ==
Accolades received by Magic Kamison
Year	Award	Category	Recipient	Result	Ref.
2007	21st PMPC Star Awards for Television	Best Horror-Fantasy Program	Magic Kamison	Nominated	
2007	21st PMPC Star Awards for Television	Best New Female TV Personality	Jewel Mische	Nominated	
