= Prince Stefan (actor) =

Filipino comedian and actor

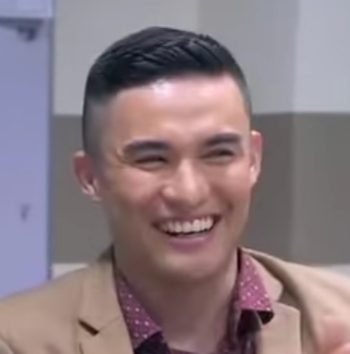
- Stefan on Love Is... 2017 telemovie
- Born: Stephan Andrei Anlocotan; February 13, 1989 (age 37); Iloilo City, Philippines
- Other names: Onyx, Kuya Stef
- Occupations: Comedian, actor, model
- Years active: 2006–present
- Agents: Regal Entertainment; Viva Artists Agency

Stephan Andrei Anlocotan, who is better known by his screen name Prince Stefan (born February 13, 1989, in Iloilo City, Philippines), is a Filipino comedian and actor of Saudi Arabian-Filipino descent.

== Career ==
Stefan appeared on StarStruck: The Next Level, and on several GMA Network shows including the telefantasya Mga Mata ni Anghelita and SOP Rules. As of September 1, 2007, Stefan also became a Regal Films contract star.

In 2008, Stefan played a supporting role in Magdusa Ka and a small anatologist role in Luna Mystika. The following year, Stefan appeared in Ang Babaeng Hinugot Sa Aking Tadyang.

After taking a break from showbiz, he transferred to ABS-CBN in 2015.

== Personal life ==
Stefan is openly gay. He was in a relationship with Singapore-based model Paolo Amores.

== Filmography ==
=== Film ===
Year	Title	Role
2008	Shake, Rattle & Roll X: Class Picture	Greg
2015	I Love You. Thank You.	Red
2015	Chain Mail	
2016	Bakit Lahat ng Gwapo may Boyfriend?	Tom
2016	Working Beks	Jet
2017	100 Tula Para Kay Stella	Chuck

=== Television ===
Year	Title	Role
2006–2007	StarStruck: The Next Level	First Prince
2007	Startalk: Struck Attack	Semi-Regular Co-Host
2007	SOP Rules	Performer
2007	Mga Mata ni Anghelita	Gener
2007	Boys Nxt Door	
2008	Maynila	Mark
2008	Joaquin Bordado	Young Jerome Apacible / Miguel Aguila
2008	Magdusa Ka	Sonny
2008–2009	Luna Mystika	Henry
2009	Ang Babaeng Hinugot Sa Aking Tadyang	Aristotle "Aris" Alcaraz
2009	SRO Cinemaserye: Rowena Joy	Christian
2009	Sine Novela: Tinik Sa Dibdib	Joshua Domingo
2010	Gumapang Ka Sa Lusak	Dodo
2010	Bantatay	Calvin Rosales
2011	My Lover, My Wife	Dong
2012	Magdalena: Anghel sa Putikan	Ice Rivero
2015	Maalaala Mo Kaya: Baller	Russell
2015	You're My Home	
2016	Till I Met You	Nico
2017	A Love to Last	Oscar
2017	Love Is	N/A
2018	Maalaala Mo Kaya: Bibliya	Fred
2018	Ipaglaban Mo: Hawig	Patrick
2019	Hinahanap-Hanap Kita	Reggie

== Awards and nominations ==
Year	Critics/Contests	Result
2007	21st Star Awards for Television: Best New Male Personality	Nominated
2007	StarStruck: The Next Level Final Judgement	First Prince

Awards and achievements
Preceded by Gian Carlos	StarStruck; Runner-up; 2006 (season 4)	Succeeded by Enzo Pineda
