= Martin Escudero =

Filipino actor

- Born: Mart Enrico Escudero; April 11, 1990 (age 36); Quezon City, Philippines
- Other name: Mart Escudero
- Education: Academe of St. Jude Thaddeus (high school); STI College - Alabang (college)
- Occupations: Actor; model; television personality
- Years active: 2003–present
- Agents: Star Magic (2005–06; 2019–21) GMA Artist Center (2006–10; 2017–19; 2021–23) TV5 Network (2011–15); Net 25 (2022–present)
- Height: 5 ft 9 in (175 cm)
- Partner: Aiza Faeldonia (2016)
- Family: Francis Escudero (uncle); Dette Escudero (aunt); Salvador Escudero (grandfather); Evelina Escudero (grandmother)

Mart Enrico Escudero (born April 11, 1990) is a Filipino actor, model, and television personality. He rose to fame during his stint at the fourth season of StarStruck. He also starred in the indie film Zombadings: Patayin sa Shokot si Remington with Kerbie Zamora.

== Early life and education ==
Escudero studied at the Academe of St. Jude Thaddeus in GMA, Cavite, where he was an active participant of the Boy Scouts of the Philippines under the leadership of Eagle Scout Andrew Alcantara. He was only a second-year high school student when he was accepted as a contestant in StarStruck season 4.

== Career ==
Escudero was an exclusive artist at GMA Network. His last show in the network was Jillian: Namamasko Po, until he returned in 2017.

He is a former contract star under the Talent5 (now Star Worx) talent agency of TV5 Network. In 2011, he made his first appearance in the network through the drama Babaeng Hampaslupa. Martin is set to appear in the romantic comedy television show Kano Luvs Pinay starting on September 5, 2015. He also stars in TV5's first online sitcom entitled Tanods.

Since 2017, Escudero is a freelancer, appearing on both GMA Network and ABS-CBN.

== Personal life ==
A part of the Escudero political family, Martin is the nephew of senator Chiz Escudero and congresswoman Dette Escudero, and a grandson of the late former congressman Salvador Escudero and former congresswoman Evelina Escudero.

He was in a relationship with his former onscreen partner, Jennica Garcia, from December 2007 to February 2009. They have maintained their friendship, and are professional in dealing with their joint projects.

Escudero was said to have pursued Bachelor of Science in Hotel and Restaurant Management at the Alabang branch of STI College.

== Filmography ==
=== Film ===
Year	Title	Role
2003	Kung Ako Na Lang Sana	Emmy's godson
2003	Malikmata	Ghost
2007	Hide and Seek	Joseph
2007	Shake, Rattle and Roll 9	Vince (segment "Engkanto")
2008	My Monster Mom	Pipo
2008	Mag-ingat Ka Sa...Kulam	Neil
2008	Shake, Rattle & Roll X	Celso (segment "Nieves the Engkanto Slayer")
2009	Shake, Rattle & Roll XI	Ryan (segment "Lamanglupa")
2010	Shake, Rattle and Roll 12	Dennis (segment "Punerarya")
2011	Zombadings 1: Patayin sa Shokot si Remington	Remington
2012	Moron 5 and the Crying Lady	Michael Angelo
2012	Shake, Rattle and Roll Fourteen: The Invasion	Private Solomon Conde (segment "Lost Command")
2013	Kung Fu Divas	Unknown
2014	Moron 5.2: The Transformation	Michael Angelo (cameo in flashback)
2014	Feng Shui 2	Moy
2015	Felix Manalo	Jun Santos
2015	#Ewankosau Saranghaeyo	Unknown
2016	The Unmarried Wife	Geru
2021	Fruits N' Vegetables: Mga Bulakboleros	Policeman 4 at Road Street

=== Television ===
Year	Title	Role
2005	Mga Anghel na Walang Langit	Guest Cast
2005	Qpids	Prince Charming (billed as Mark Butler)
2006	Agawin Mo Man ang Lahat	Eman
2006–2007	StarStruck: The Next Level	Ultimate Loveteam
2007	SOP Rules	Himself
2007	Boys Nxt Door	Atom
2007–2008	Impostora	Santiago "Yago" Cayetano
2007	Fantastic Man	Carding
2007	Pasan Ko ang Daigdig	Isko
2008	Babangon Ako't Dudurugin Kita	Roman
2008	Maynila	Various
2008	Ako si Kim Samsoon	Kokoy
2008–2009	Gagambino	Noel Albuento
2009	Dear Friend	Mateo
2009	Ang Babaeng Hinugot sa Aking Tadyang	Ulysses Valdez
2009	Rosalinda	Beto Perez
2009	SRO Cinemaserye: Reunion	Benjo
2009	Dear Friend: The Three Bachelors	Miguel
2010	Gumapang Ka sa Lusak	Jonathan Guatlo
2010	Jillian: Namamasko Po	Greg
2011	Babaeng Hampaslupa	Andrew Sy
2011	Star Confessions	Jao Mapa
2011–2012	Glamorosa	Calvin Lustico
2012	Kapitan Awesome	Efren
2012	Enchanted Garden	Pako
2013–2014	Positive	Carlo Santillan
2014	Obsession	James Calderon
2014	Wattpad Presents: Just for A While	Luke
2015	Wattpad Presents: How to Break Up with The Bad Boy	Chance
2015	Wattpad Presents: Pristine Academy	Kiefer / Kiera
2015	Kano Luvs Pinay	Dong Bigoy
2017	Pepito Manaloto	Episode Guest
2017	Tadhana: Saudi Beauty Queen	Jerry
2017	Celebrity Bluff	Contestant
2017	Dear Uge: Hiwalay kung hiwalay	Tim
2017	Impostora	Dayang Villaroman
2017	Sunday PinaSaya	Himself / Guest
2018	Maynila: Rainbow Love	Jaz
2018	Magpakailanman: Ang Babae sa Likod ng Blusang Itim	Young Ricardo Cepeda
2019	Magpakailanman: Beki Basketball Beauties	Iwa
2019–2020	FPJ's Ang Probinsiyano	Police Insp. (Lieutenant) Karlo Ramos
2021	Tadhana: Online Sabong	Tom
2022	Quizon CT (Comedy Theater)	Cast Member
2024	High Street	Damien

=== Online shows ===
Year	Title	Role
2015	Tanods	Nestor Apolonio

== Awards and nominations ==
Year	Award-giving body	Category	Nominated work	Result
2008	38th GMMSF Box-Office Entertainment Awards	Most Promising Male Star	—N/a	Won
2012	9th EnPresS Golden Screen Awards	Best Performance by an Actor in a Lead Role (Musical or Comedy)	Zombadings: Patayin sa Shokot si Remington	Won
2012	10th Gawad TANGLAW Awards	Best Actor	Zombadings: Patayin sa Shokot si Remington	Won
2015	13th Gawad TANGLAW Awards	Best Performance by an Actor in a TV Series	Positive	Won
