= Aljur Abrenica =

Filipino actor (born 1990)

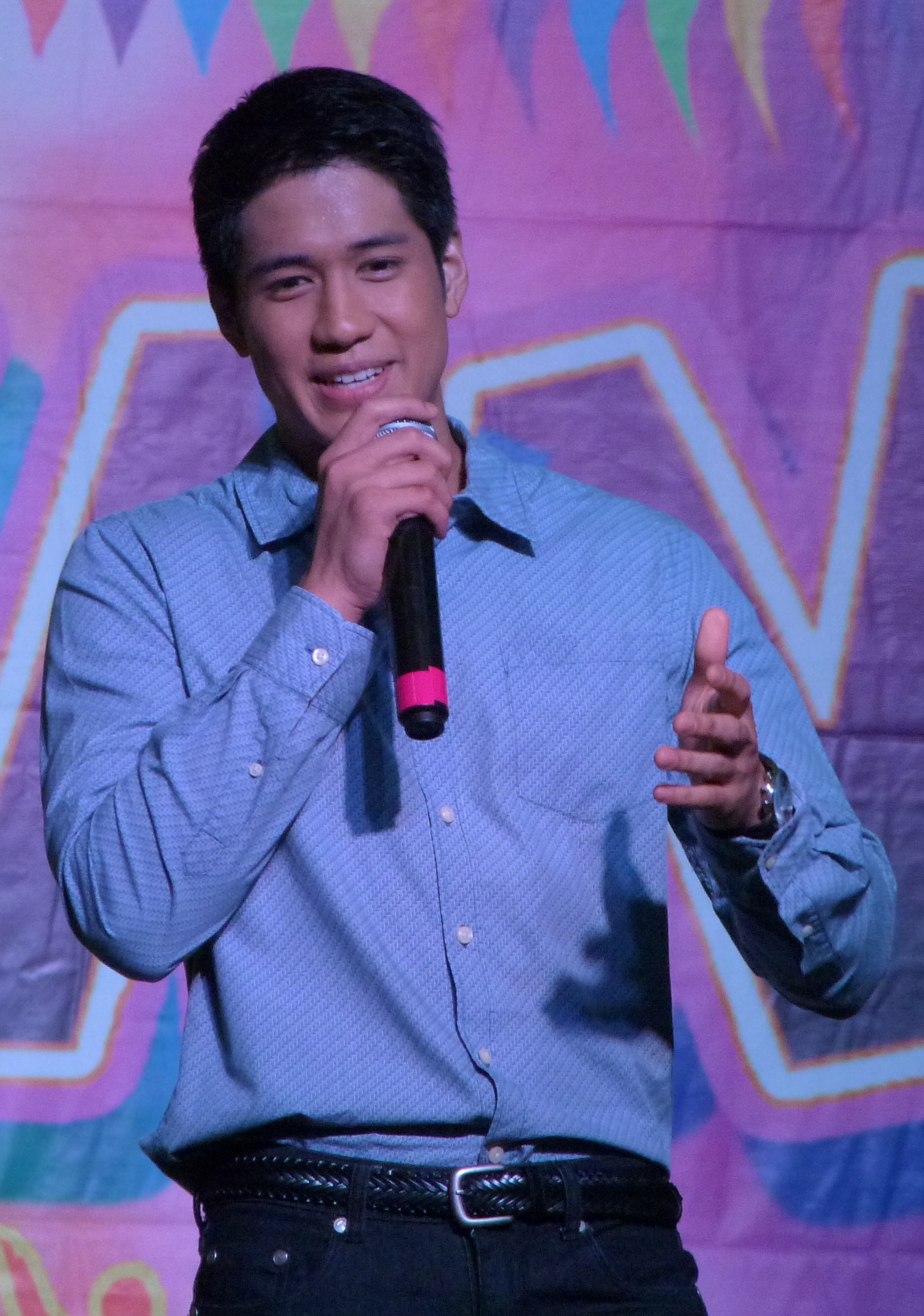
- Abrenica in February 2013.
- Born: Aljur Mikael Guiang Abrenica; March 24, 1990 (age 36); Angeles City, Philippines
- Education: Don Bosco Academy Pampanga
- Occupations: Actor; singer
- Years active: 2006–present
- Agent(s): GMA Artist Center (2006–2017); Star Magic (2017–2022; 2023–present); Brightlight Productions (2021–2022)
- Height: 5 ft 9 in (1.75 m)
- Political party: PRP (2024–2025)
- Spouse: Kylie Padilla (m. 2018; sep. 2021)
- Partner: AJ Raval (2022–present)
- Children: 5
- Relatives: Vin Abrenica (brother); Allen Abrenica (brother); Alleah Abrenica (sister); Sophie Albert (sister-in-law)
- Musical career
- Genre: Pop
- Instruments: Vocals, Guitar
- Years active: 2006–present
- Labels: GMA Records; Star Music

Aljur Mikael Guiang Abrenica (born March 24, 1990) is a Filipino actor and singer. He appeared on the fourth season of StarStruck.

== Early life ==
His father, Alfonso Abrenica Jr., was a musician, and his mother, Amor Guiang, was a member of a band. Abrenica attended Don Bosco Academy, Pampanga in high school and has said that he aspired to become a pilot by pursuing aeronautics. Abrenica is the older brother of Vin Abrenica.

== Career ==
=== 2006–2017: Breakthrough project, leading role and Ultimate Hunk title ===
In 2006, he joined reality-based talent search show, StarStruck, and won the "Ultimate Hunk" title. As of September 2007, Abrenica was signed with Regal Films. Abrenica played Cervano/Zaido in Zaido: Pulis Pangkalawakan. He has also appeared in Dyesebel and Boys Nxt Door, Luna Mystika and SOP Rules. He is also named the "Next Big Male Star" by Yes! Magazine.

Throughout his career on GMA Network, he was part of the lead cast of All My Life, The Last Prince and Machete, among others. He also starred in the film Nandito Ako...Nagmamahal Sa'Yo, produced by Regal Films. Abrenica joined in a GMA Christmas Reality show, Puso Ng Pasko: Artista Challenge.

In July 2014, Abrenica filed for a petition before the court to be released from GMA Network, stating that the direction of his career does not align with original plans. Despite this, he was still given lead roles in Kambal Sirena and Once Again. He was let go of his home network when his contract expired in March 2017. His last appearances were off-contract guest roles on shows like Bubble Gang.

=== 2017–2019: Move to ABS-CBN ===
In August 2017, Abrenica signed an exclusive contract with ABS-CBN. He got his first lead role in the network with Asintado.

== Other ventures ==
=== Business ===
Abrenica has a family owned resort called, Patio Alfonso Resort located in Batangas.

== Personal life ==
Abrenica is a practicing Born-again Christian.

Abrenica began dating actress Kylie Padilla from 2011 to 2014, before rekindling their relationship in 2016. The two became engaged in January 2017, Padilla gave birth to her and Abrenica's first child, a son named Alas Joaquin, on August 4, 2017. Abrenica and Padilla married in December 2018. Padilla gave birth to Abrenica's second son, Axl Romeo, on December 9, 2019. The couple separated in April 2021. Padilla's father Robin Padilla claimed the separation was due to Abrenica's infidelity, while Abrenica claimed that Padilla "cheated first" and that he "gave up on [her]." Abrenica later admitted in April 2023 and confirmed their marriage failed because he was unfaithful to Padilla, and that they are currently co-parenting their children.

Abrenica currently in a relationship with actress AJ Raval since July 2022, which they publicly revealed in February 2023. Both Abrenica and Padilla denied accusations that Raval was the third party that led to their breakup. On November 12, 2025, during an interview on Fast Talk with Boy Abunda, Raval revealed that she and Abrenica share three kids together, Alkina, Aljur Junior, and Abraham. Abrenica and Raval maintain a good relationship with Padilla, and Abrenica's five children remain close together.

=== Legal issues ===
Abrenica with his legal counsel Atty. Topacio filed a Judicial Confirmation of Rescission of Contract against GMA Network on July 14, 2014, in Quezon City Hall of Justice. He cited artistic differences as the reason for filing the termination of his contract which would expire in 2017. On July 28, 2014, GMA Network received the complaint, saying it was unfortunate because they invested on Abrenica by giving him primetime shows.

The network continued to give Abrenica programs such as The Half Sisters, Dangwa and Once Again. In 2016, he apologized to GMA Network publicly, confirming that his legal case with them was already settled. His contract with GMA Network expired in March 2017, then he moved to ABS-CBN in August of the same year.

== Filmography ==
=== Film ===
Year	Title	Role	Note(s)
2008	Loving You	Ryan Peyra	
2008	I.T.A.L.Y. (I Trust and Love You)	Budoy Pinlac	
2009	Nandito Ako... Nagmamahal sa 'Yo	Lorenzo "Tata" Lugod	
2011	Temptation Island	Alfredo	
2012	My Kontrabida Girl	Chris Bernal	
2012	D' Kilabots: Pogi Brothers (Weh?!?)	Police officer	
2012	Sosy Problems	Benjo	
2014	Sa Ngalan ng Ama, Ina, at mga Anak	Ka-Dorio	
2014	Basement		
2016	Expressway	Morris	
2016	Ang Hapis at Himagsik ni Hermano Puli	Hermano Puli	
2021	Nerisa		
2022	Pula ang Kulay ng Gabi		
2022	Mamasapano: Now It Can Be Told	Lt. Allan Franco	
2023	Kahit Maputi Na ang Buhok Ko		
2023	Single Bells		
2023	Sa Kamay ng Diyos	Pastor Jonard N. Pamor	
2025	Jeongbu	Ethan	
TBA	The First Defender	LapuLapu	

=== Television ===
==== Drama series ====
Year	Title	Role	Note(s)	Ref.
2007–2008	Boys Nxt Door	Migs		
2007–2008	Zaido: Pulis Pangkalawakan	Cervano Torres / Red Zaido		
2008	Mars Ravelo's Dyesebel	Paolo Legaspi		
2008–2009	Luna Mystika	Libado		
2009	Sine Novela: Dapat Ka Bang Mahalin?	Miguelito "Lito" Sanchez		
2009	All My Life	Jules Romualdez		
2010	The Last Prince	Prinsepe Almiro / Haring Almiro		
2010	Ilumina	Yñigo Salcedo		
2011	Pablo S. Gomez' Machete	Machete / Dakila Romero		
2011–2012	Amaya	Dayaw		
2012	Together Forever	Santiago "Yago" Carion		
2012	Coffee Prince	Arthur Ochoa		
2013	Indio	Bagandi		
2013–2014	Prinsesa ng Buhay Ko	Nicolo "Nick" Grande		
2014	Kambal Sirena	Kevin Villanueva		
2015	The Half Sisters	Malcolm Angeles	Uncredited	
2015–2016	Dangwa	Lorenzo "Renz" Arguente		
2016	Once Again	Edgardo "Edgar" Del Mundo / Aldrin Sanchez		
2016	Usapang Real Love	Kiso		
2017	FPJ's Ang Probinsyano	Miguel Enriquez		
2018	Asintado	Alexander "Xander" Guerrero		
2018	Home Sweetie Home	Armando		
2019–2020	Sandugo	Aristotle "Aris" Reyes / Leo Balthazar		
2022	One Good Day	Kyzer Catillo		
2024	WPS (West Philippine Sea Defenders)	Bobby		
2025	Incognito	Takako Rai Guard	Cameo in episode 1	
2025–2026	FPJ’s Batang Quiapo	PLT Hector Victorino		

==== Drama anthology ====
Year	Title	Role
2007	Mga Kuwento ni Lola Basyang	Carlos / Pedro
2009	Dear Friend	Alfred
2011	Spooky Nights Presents: The Ringtone	Brix
2012	Spooky Valentine Presents: Manibela	Ariel
2013	Magpakailanman: Bayarang Adonis	Kristoffer King
2014	Magpakailanman: Gas Mo Bukas Ko	Joel Javier
2015	Wagas	Edwin
2015	Maynila: Dead na Dead Sayo	Popoy
2015	Maynila: Happily Ever After	Raymond
2015	Karelasyon: Karma	Marco/Jericho
2016	Wagas	April Boy Regino
2016	Karelasyon: Bilin	Joseph
2017	Maalaala Mo Kaya: Tungkod	Anton
2017	Wansapanataym: Louie's Biton	Ralph Lorenzo
2018	Ipaglaban Mo: Diploma	Richard Domingo
2018	Ipaglaban Mo: Dalisay	Vince Hernandez
2018	The End: Accidental Friend	Zach

==== Variety and reality shows ====
Year	Title	Role
2006–2007	StarStruck: The Next Level	Himself (contestant / Ultimate Hunk)
2007–2010	SOP	Himself (co-host / performer)
2010–2013	Party Pilipinas	Himself (co-host / performer)
2011	Follow That Star	Himself (host)
2013–2015	Sunday All Stars	Himself (co-host / performer)
2017–2020; 2026–present	ASAP	Himself (co-host / performer)
2019	Pinoy Big Brother: Otso	Himself (Celebrity Star Player)
2020	Eat Bulaga!	Himself (Bawal Judgmental Celebrity Judge)

== Discography ==
=== Studio albums ===
Year	Title	Label
2014	Mahal Pa Rin Kita	MCA Music
2010	Self Titled	Musiko Records/Sony Music

== Awards and nominations ==
Year	Award	Category	Nomination	Result
2013	1st Sunday All Stars Awards	Stand Out Season Performer	None	Won
2012	100 Sexiest Men in the Philippines	Sexiest Filipino Men	None	Ranked # 2
2011	100 Sexiest Men in the Philippines	Sexiest Filipino Men	None	Ranked # 11
2010	100 Sexiest Men in the Philippines	Sexiest Filipino Men	None	Rank # 4
2009	100 Sexiest Men in the Philippines	Sexiest Filipino Men	None	Rank # 1
2006	Starstruck Season 4	Starstruck Ultimate Hunk	None	Won

Year	Award-giving body	Category	Result
2009	GMMSF Box-Office Entertainment Awards	Most Promising Male Star of Movies & TV	Won
2011	Yahoo! OMG! Awards Philippines	Hottest Actor of the Year	Nominated

Awards and achievements
Preceded by Marky Cielo	StarStruck; 2006 (season 4)	Succeeded by Steven Silva
