= Nancy Castiglione =

Canadian actress and singer (born 1981)

- Born: Nancy Jane Castiglione; February 24, 1981 (age 45); Winnipeg, Manitoba, Canada
- Other name: Nancy Jane
- Occupations: Actress; model; singer
- Years active: 2002–2012
- Agent: GMA Artist Center (2002–2006)
- Children: 3

Nancy Castiglione (born Nancy Jane Castiglione on February 24, 1981) is a Canadian former actress and singer who worked in the Philippines.

== Personal life ==
She had a relationship with Luis Manzano. She was also linked to celebrity doctor Hayden Kho. She is a mother of twins.

== Career ==
GMA 7 contracted and launched her as one of the mainstream actresses in the TV series, Sana ay Ikaw na Nga with Dingdong Dantes and Tanya Garcia. Her exemplary acting performance qualified her for the award as Best New Female Actress in the Star Awards.

After taking a hiatus, Castiglione reflected on her future. On her reemergence, Nancy has turned into a singer and dancer who still engages in acting and modeling.

She is now a broker and focusing on her family and work.

== Filmography ==
=== Film ===
Year	Title	Role
2002	I Think I'm in Love	Fiona
2002	Agimat, Anting-Anting ni Lolo	Queen Evil
2003	Asboobs: Asal Bobo	Angeles
2007	Signos	Sandra

=== Television ===
Year	Title	Role
2002	Magandang Tanghali Bayan	Herself / Host
2002	Kahit Kailan	Abby
2002	Sana ay Ikaw na Nga	Patrice
2003	Starstruck: Season 1	Herself / Host
2003	Love to Love: Season 1	Emilie
2004	Mulawin	Muyak
2004	Lagot Ka, Isusumbong Kita	Trisha
2004	Hanggang Kailan	Tara
2005	Love to Love: Season 4	Honeylet / Jamie
2005	Encantadia	Muyak
2005	Etheria: Ang Ikalimang Kaharian ng Encantadia	Muyak
2006	Encantadia: Pag-ibig Hanggang Wakas	Muyak
2006	Your Song Present: Para Sa 'Yo	Nancy
2006	Komiks	Nancy
2007	Love Spell	Rachel
2010	Starstruck: Season 5 Live Finale	Herself / Co-host / Guest

== Discography ==
Studio albums

=== Studio Album ===
Artist	Album	Tracks	Year	Label
Nancy Jane	Nancy Jane	1. Deep Inside You; 2. Love Song; 3. Control; 4. Moonlight Mood; 5. Hold You Close; 6. Rock It; 7. When You Play Around; 8. My Perfect Diet; 9. (Driving Around) So Good Together; 10. Attraction/Connection; 11. Without You; 12. Control (Leon Chaplain Mix)	2008	Warner Music Philippines
