= Douglas Quijano =

Filipino talent manager (1944-2009)

- Born: Douglas Cordovez Quijano; 24 July 1944; Lanao del Norte, Philippines
- Died: 13 June 2009 (aged 64); Lucban, Quezon, Philippines
- Other name: Tito Dougs
- Education: San Sebastian College – Recoletos; Universidad Central de Madrid; Ruprecht Karl University of Heidelberg
- Years active: 1972–2008
- Organization: GMA Network

Douglas Cordovez Quijano (July 24, 1944 – June 13, 2009) was a Filipino talent manager. He was credited for "discovering and developing some of the Philippine local entertainment industry's biggest stars."

== Life and career ==
Quijano born on July 24, 1944, in Lanao del Norte. He was the oldest of six siblings. In the late 1960s, he became a columnist and writer at the Daily Star, a local tabloid paper. He started his career as a talent manager handling veteran actor Tirso Cruz III and the superstar Nora Aunor. Quijano then helped Lily Monteverde establish Regal Films, a filmmaking and entertainment firm producing various movies such as Scorpio Nights and Shake, Rattle, and Roll. He also established the production company Sine Filipino and became a major producer and handler of MAQ Productions.

In 1999, Quijano was awarded the Dr. Jose Perez Memorial Award from the Filipino Academy of Movie Arts and Sciences.

Quijano participated in the production of over 140 television shows and movies including the recent Starstruck: The Next Level (2006) and Happily Ever After (2005). He was a talent manager in GMA Network his best friend was Lolit Solis. Quijano was a judge on the TV series StarStruck. He served as a consultant for YES! Magazine, a local showbiz publication, and Philippine Entertainment Portal (PEP), an online tracker of various showbiz news and events.

Before his death, he was the business manager of Richard Gutierrez' product endorsements.

== Death ==
Quijano died on 13 June 2009 of a heart attack.
