= SOP (TV program) =

Philippine television variety show

- Title card
- Also known as: Sobrang Okey, Pare (Note: Title from February 2, 1997 to January 25, 1998.); SOP (Note: Title from February 1, 1998 to March 30, 2003. Later used from January 31, 2010 to February 28, 2010.); SOP Rules (Note: Title from April 6, 2003 to November 15, 2009.); SOP Fully Charged (Note: Title from November 22, 2009 to January 24, 2010.)
- Genre: Variety show
- Directed by: Al Quinn; Louie Ignacio
- Country of origin: Philippines
- Original language: Tagalog
- No. of episodes: 672

Production
- Production locations: GMA Broadway Centrum, Quezon City, Philippines (1997–2000); Studio 5, GMA Network Center, Quezon City, Philippines (2000–08); Studio 7, GMA Network Studios Annex, Quezon City, Philippines (2008–10)
- Camera setup: Multiple-camera setup
- Running time: 180 minutes
- Production company: GMA Entertainment TV

Original release
- Network: GMA Network
- Release: February 2, 1997 – February 28, 2010

Related
- SOP Gigsters

SOP is a Philippine television variety show broadcast by GMA Network. Directed by Al Quinn and Louie Ignacio, it premiered on February 2, 1997. The show concluded on February 28, 2010, with a total of 672 episodes.

== Overview ==
SOP premiered on February 2, 1997, live from the GMA Broadway Studios. Regular dancers included the VIP Dancers, Universal Motion Dancers, Abstract Dancers and Kidz at Work; with Al Quinn as the director and German Moreno as a production consultant.

In 2005, the cast of SOP and SOP Gigsters together with Mel Tiangco, Joey de Leon, Richard Gomez and German Moreno went to San Francisco, California, United States, for the launch of GMA Pinoy TV.

== Cast ==
Hosts

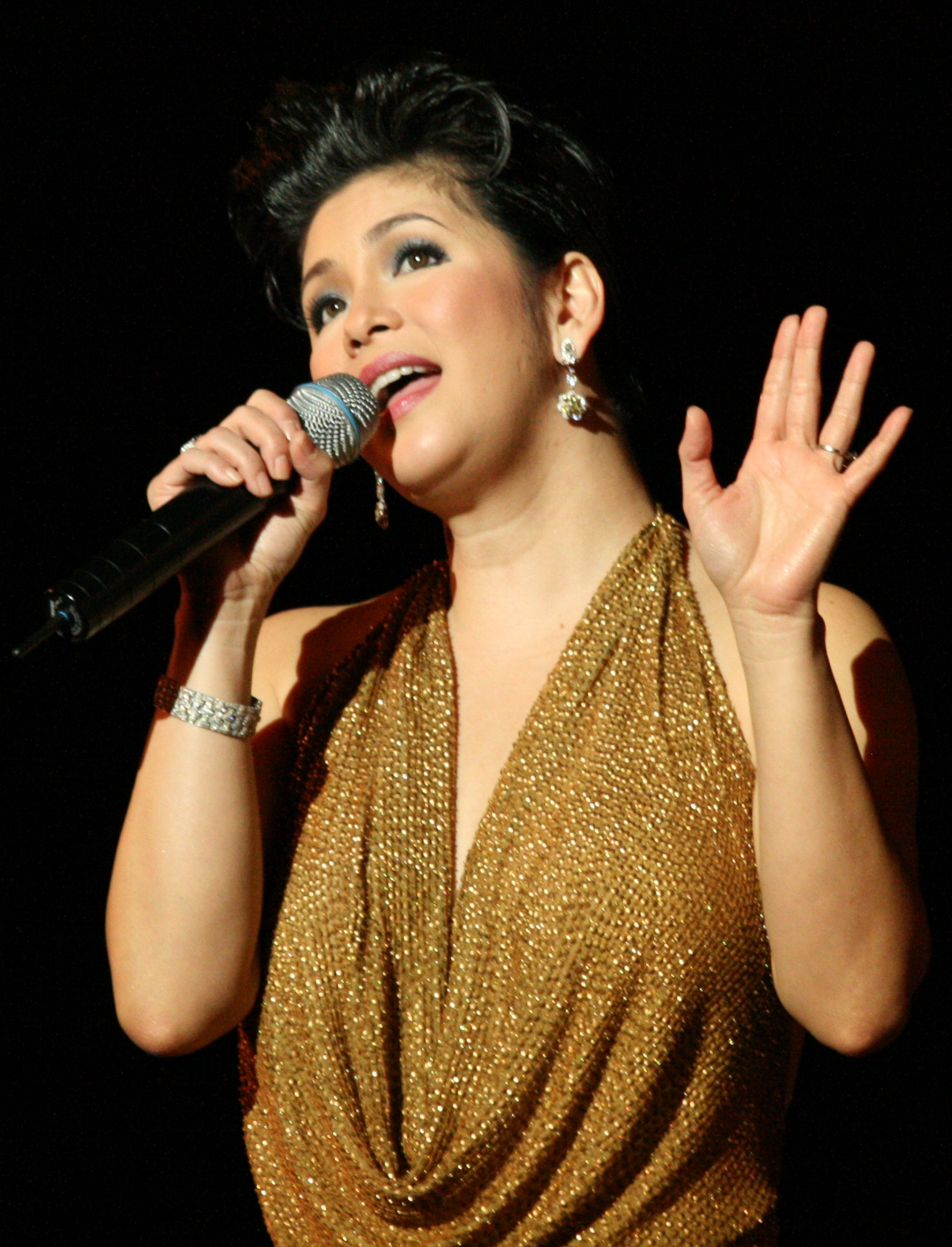
Regine Velasquez

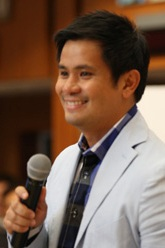
Ogie Alcasid

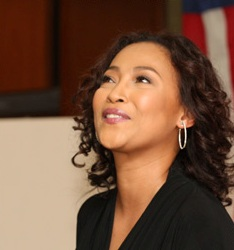
Jaya

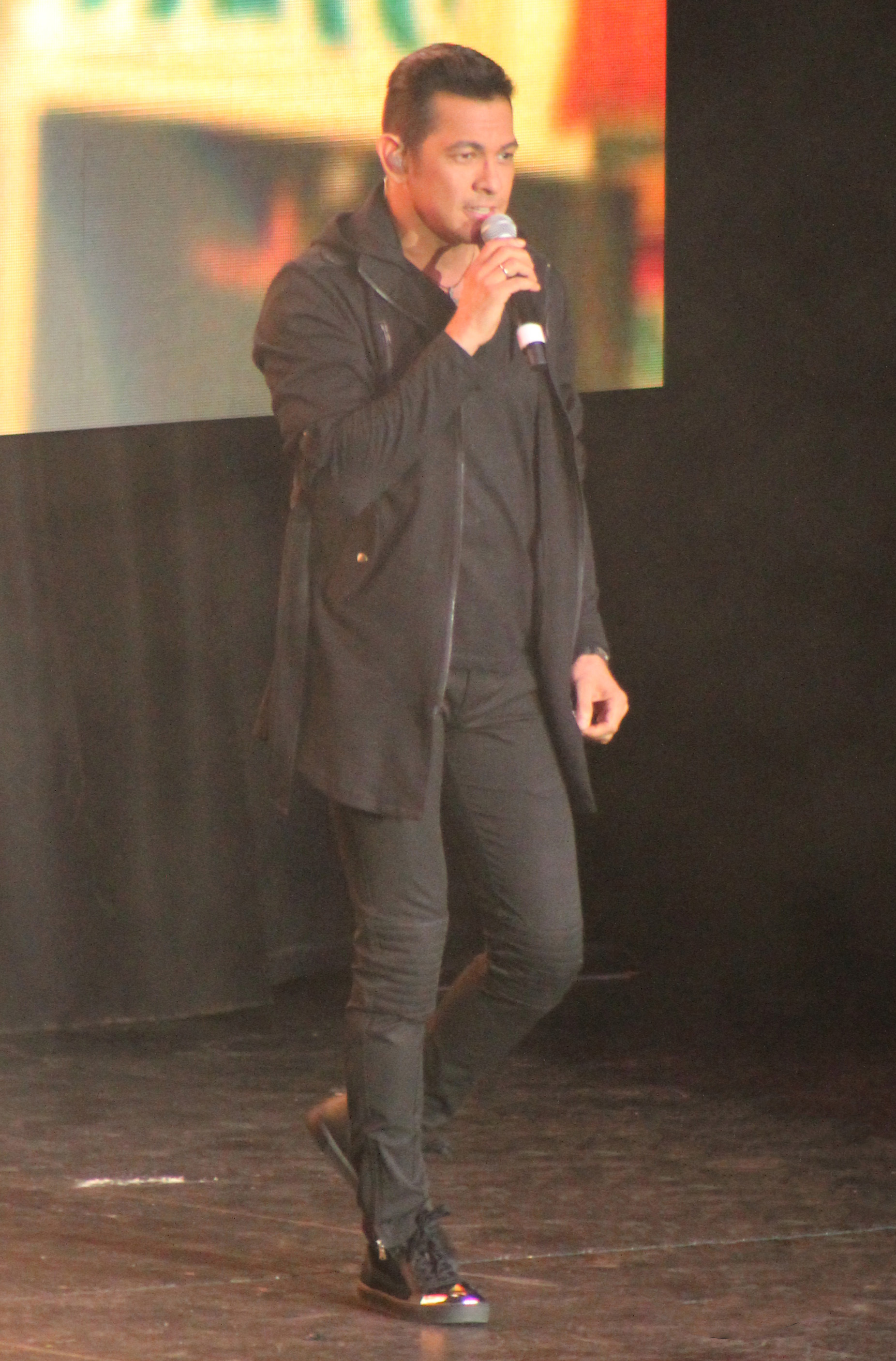
Gary Valenciano

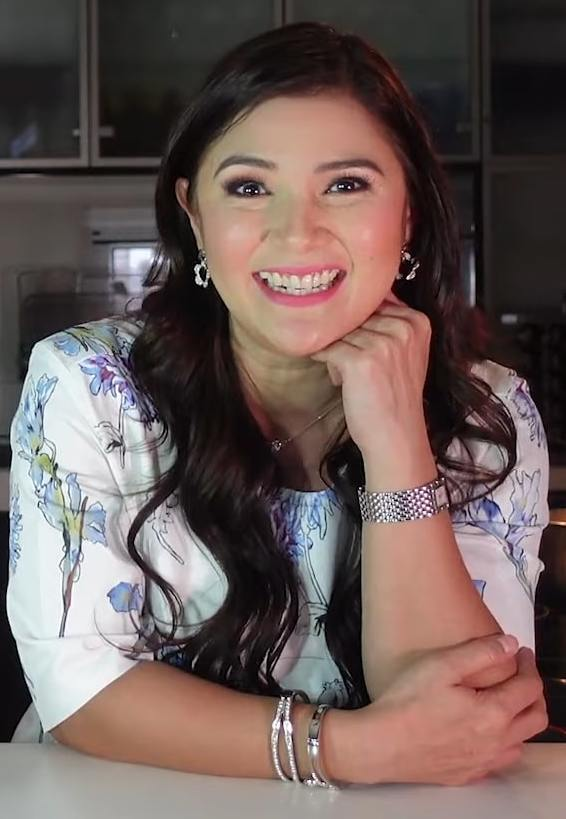
Vina Morales

- Ogie Alcasid (1997–2010)
- Janno Gibbs (1997–2010)
- Vina Morales (1997–99)
- G. Toengi (1999–2000)
- Cacai Velasquez (1997–2002)
- Regine Velasquez (1998–2010)
- Gary Valenciano (1999–2003)
- Jaya (2000–10)

=== Co-hosts and performers ===
- 604
- Carla Abellana (2009–10)
- Aljur Abrenica (2007–10)
- Marvin Agustin (2006–10)
- Marco Alcaraz
- Bernadette Allyson-Estrada (1997–2001)
- Bobby Andrews (1997–2003)
- Aryana (2005–06)
- Roxanne Barcelo (1999–2003)
- Kris Bernal (2007–10)
- James Blanco (2000–05)
- Nancy Castiglione (2003–07)
- Billy Crawford (2007–08)
- Chico and Delamar
- Glaiza de Castro (2006–10)
- Chris Cayzer (2008–10)
- Ryza Cenon (2005–10)
- Marky Cielo (2006–08)
- Jake Cuenca (2003–06)
- Anne Curtis (2000–04)
- Rita Daniela (2006–10)
- Dingdong Dantes (1998–2010)
- Angelika dela Cruz (1999–2003, 2008–10)
- Maybelyn dela Cruz (1998–2003)
- Joshua Desiderio
- Joshua Dionisio (2009–10)
- Mylene Dizon
- Sunshine Dizon (1998–2010)
- Cogie Domingo (2001–06)
- Gabby Eigenmann (1998–2007)
- Mart Escudero (2007–10)
- Brenan Espartinez
- Heart Evangelista (2008–10)
- Frencheska Farr (2009–10)
- Barbie Forteza (2009–10)
- Joross Gamboa
- Maricris Garcia (2007–10)
- Toni Gonzaga (1999–2004)
- Carlo Guevarra
- Matteo Guidicelli (2009–10)
- Raymond Gutierrez
- Richard Gutierrez (2002–10)
- Ruffa Gutierrez (1998–2002)
- Mark Herras (2004–10)
- Eugene Herrera
- Jerome John Hughes (2003–06)
- Dion Ignacio (2004–10)
- Joseph Izon (1998–2003)
- Jay R (2003–10)
- Karylle (2001–08)
- Bianca King (2004–10)
- Kitty Girls
- Yasmien Kurdi (2004–10)
- Kyla (2000–10)
- Kris Lawrence (2010)
- Lilet (2003–05)
- Angel Locsin (2002–07)
- Francis Magalona (1998–2006)
- Maxene Magalona (2004–10)
- Gian Magdangal (2007–10)
- Jolina Magdangal (2002–10)
- Malik
- Karel Marquez (2007–09)
- Jennylyn Mercado (2004–10)
- Lani Misalucha (2000–06)
- K. C. Montero (1998–2007)
- Vaness del Moral (2004–10)
- Champagne Morales (1999–2003)
- Jan Nieto
- Nina (2002–03)
- Chynna Ortaleza (2001–10)
- Amanda Page (1997–98)
- Paolo Paraiso
- Tyron Perez
- Lovi Poe (2006–10)
- Yassi Pressman (2009–10)
- Rufa Mae Quinto (2004–10)
- Radha (2002–04)
- Jolo Revilla
- Cristine Reyes (2004–08)
- LJ Reyes (2005–10)
- Jake Roxas
- Julie Anne San Jose (2006–10)
- Aicelle Santos (2006–10)
- Gerald Santos (2006–09)
- Danica Sotto (2000–03)
- Miko Sotto (2000–03)
- South Border
- Stags
- Miggy Tanchangco
- Antoinette Taus (1997–2001, 2002–04)
- Geoff Taylor (2009–10)
- Bryan Termulo (2007–10)
- Dennis Trillo (2004–10)
- TJ Trinidad
- Brad Turvey (2002–05)
- Greg Turvey (2002–05)
- Mo Twister
- Kevin Vernal
- April Villanueva (2005–07)
- Jonalyn Viray (2005–10)
- Trina Zuñiga (1999–2001)

== Ratings ==
According to AGB Nielsen Philippines' Mega Manila household television ratings, the final episode of SOP scored a 13% rating.

== Accolades ==
Accolades received by SOP
Year	Award	Category	Recipient	Result	Ref.
1999	New York Festivals	TV Programming and Promotion	SOP	Finalist	
2000	14th PMPC Star Awards for Television	Best Musical Variety Show	SOP	Won	
2000	14th PMPC Star Awards for Television	Best Female TV Host	Regine Velasquez	Nominated	
2000	14th PMPC Star Awards for Television	Best Male TV Host	Ogie Alcasid	Nominated	
2000	14th PMPC Star Awards for Television	Best Male TV Host	Janno Gibbs	Won	
2001	New York Festivals	TV Programming and Promotion	SOP	Finalist	
2001	15th PMPC Star Awards for Television	Best Musical Variety Show	SOP	Won	
2002	16th PMPC Star Awards for Television	Best Musical Variety Show	SOP	Won	
2004	New York Festivals	TV Programming and Promotion	SOP	Finalist	
2005	Golden Screen TV Awards	Outstanding Musical or Variety Program	SOP	Won	
2005	Golden Screen TV Awards	Outstanding Female Host in a Musical or Variety Program	Jaya	Nominated	
2005	Golden Screen TV Awards	Outstanding Female Host in a Musical or Variety Program	Regine Velasquez	Nominated	
2005	Golden Screen TV Awards	Outstanding Male Host in a Musical or Variety Program	Ogie Alcasid	Won	
2005	Golden Screen TV Awards	Outstanding Male Host in a Musical or Variety Program	Janno Gibbs	Nominated	
2006	Asian TV Awards	Variety	SOP	Finalist	
2007	New York Festivals	TV Programming and Promotion	SOP	Finalist	
2007	21st PMPC Star Awards for Television	Best Female TV Host	Regine Velasquez	Nominated	
2007	21st PMPC Star Awards for Television	Best Male TV Host	Ogie Alcasid	Nominated	
2007	21st PMPC Star Awards for Television	Best Musical Variety Show	SOP	Nominated	
2007	21st PMPC Star Awards for Television	Best New Male TV Personality	Prince Stefan	Nominated	
2008	22nd PMPC Star Awards for Television	Best Female TV Host	Regine Velasquez	Nominated	
2008	22nd PMPC Star Awards for Television	Best Male TV Host	Ogie Alcasid	Nominated	
2008	22nd PMPC Star Awards for Television	Best Musical Variety Show	SOP	Won	
2008	22nd PMPC Star Awards for Television	Best New Female TV Personality	Maricris Garcia	Nominated	
2008	22nd PMPC Star Awards for Television	Best New Male TV Personality	Hayden Kho	Nominated	
2009	Catholic Mass Media Awards	Best Entertainment Program	SOP	Won	
2009	23rd PMPC Star Awards for Television	Best Female TV Host	Regine Velasquez	Nominated	
2009	23rd PMPC Star Awards for Television	Best Male TV Host	Ogie Alcasid	Nominated	
2009	23rd PMPC Star Awards for Television	Best Musical Variety Show	SOP	Nominated	
2010	24th PMPC Star Awards for Television	Best Female TV Host	Regine Velasquez	Nominated	
2010	24th PMPC Star Awards for Television	Best Male TV Host	Ogie Alcasid	Nominated	
