= Boys Nxt Door =

Philippine television sitcom series

- Title card
- Also known as: Boys Next Door
- Genre: Sitcom
- Directed by: Jun Lana
- Starring: Marky Cielo; Aljur Abrenica; Mart Escudero; Joseph Bitangcol
- Opening theme: "Nagugulo, Nalilito" by Aljur Abrenica and Rewind Band
- Country of origin: Philippines
- Original language: Tagalog
- No. of episodes: 31

Production
- Executive producer: Lian Garcia
- Camera setup: Multiple-camera setup
- Running time: 24–41 minutes
- Production company: GMA Entertainment TV

Original release
- Network: GMA Network
- Release: June 24, 2007 – January 13, 2008

Boys Nxt Door (international title: Boys Next Door) is a Philippine television sitcom series broadcast by GMA Network. Directed by Jun Lana, it stars Marky Cielo, Aljur Abrenica, Mart Escudero and Joseph Bitangcol. It premiered on June 24, 2007. The series concluded on January 13, 2008, with a total of 31 episodes.

The series is streaming online on YouTube.

== Cast and characters ==
Cast

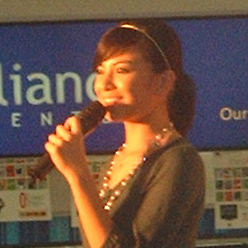
Glaiza de Castro

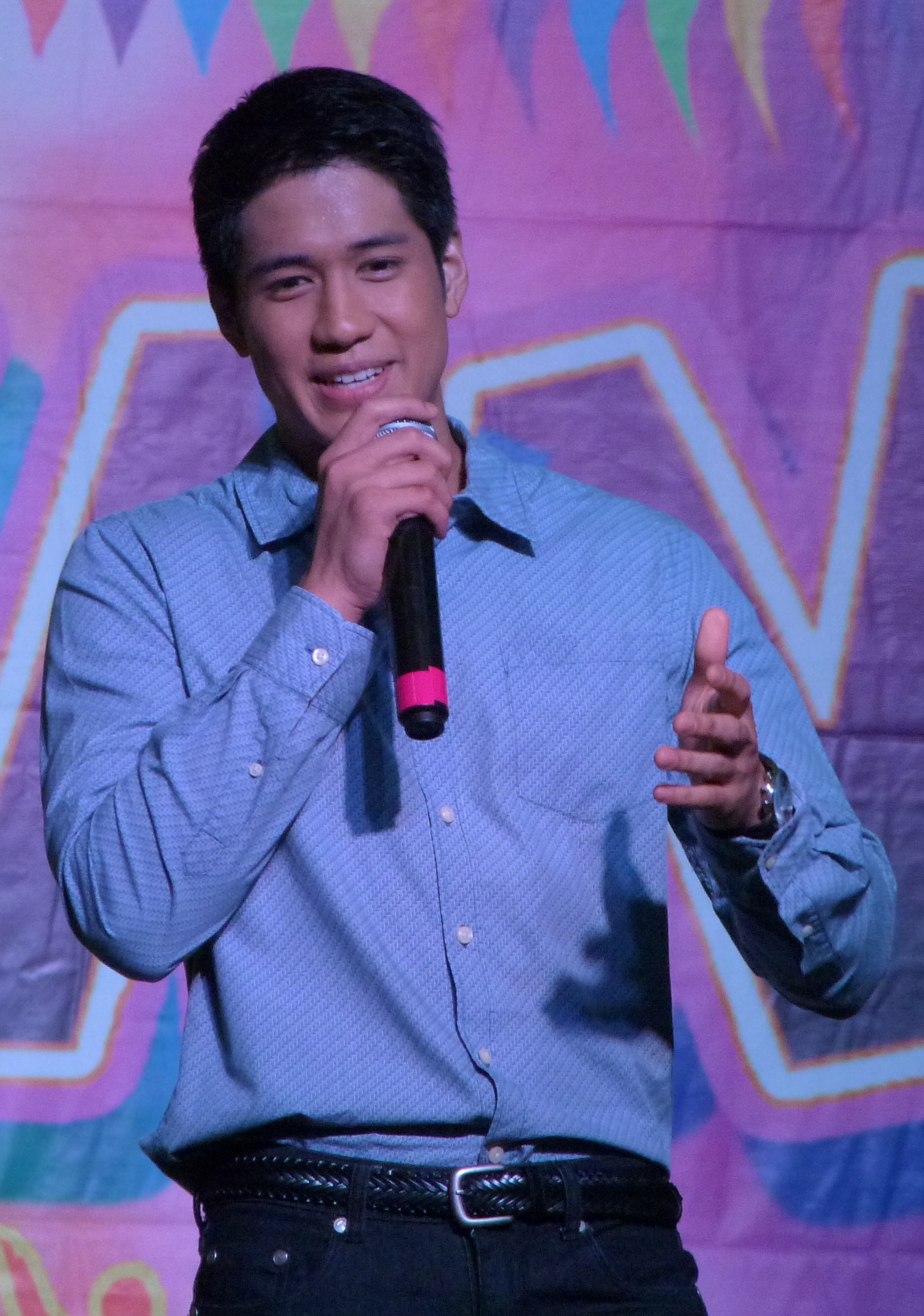
Aljur Abrenica

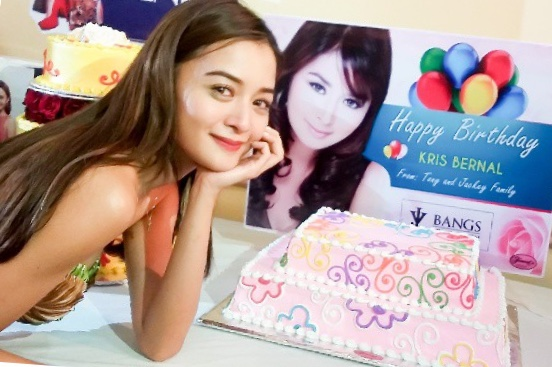
Kris Bernal

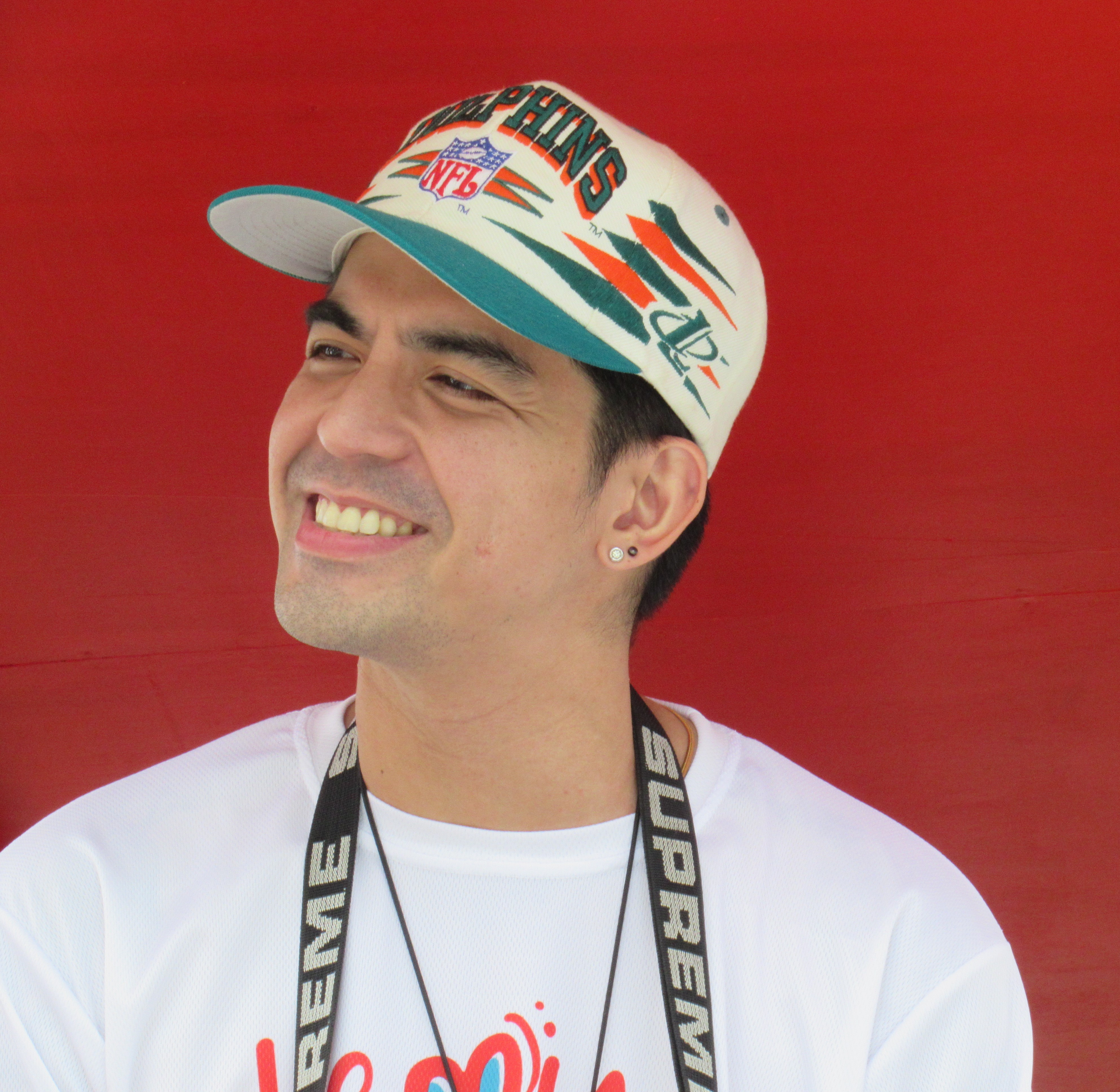
Mark Herras

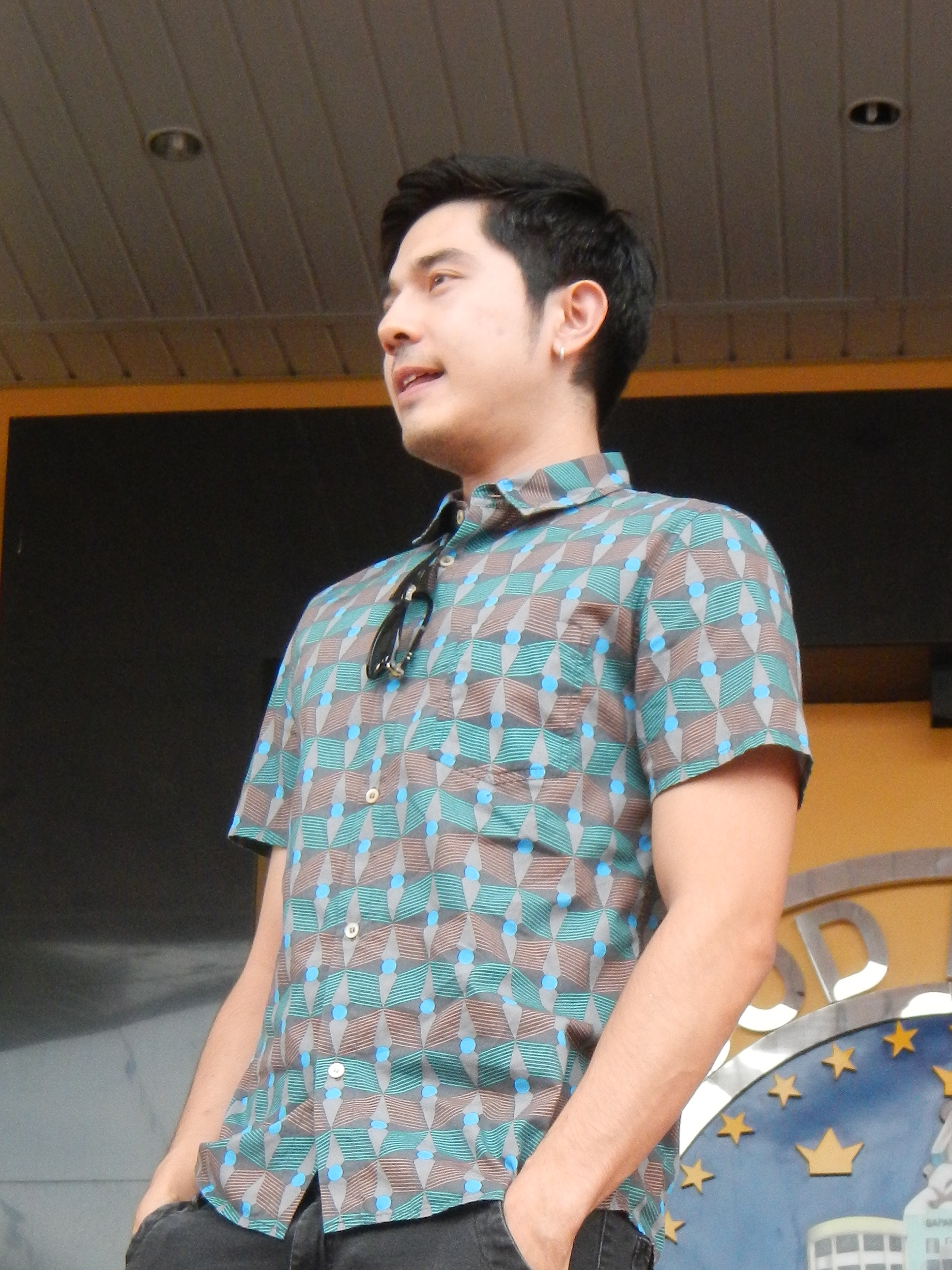
Paulo Avelino

Main cast

- Marky Cielo as Buboy
- Glaiza de Castro as Sari
- Jennica Garcia as Summer and Winter
- Mart Escudero as Atom
- Aljur Abrenica as Migs
- Kris Bernal as Coffee
- Stef Prescott as Isabel
- Rich Asuncion as Winona
- Jesi Corcuera as Milo
- Kiko Junio as Dec Dec
- Mark Herras as Zeki
- Paulo Avelino as Peter
- Patrick Garcia as Karlo
- Sheena Halili as Queenie
- Jan Manual as Raffy
- Ahron Villena as Preston
- Ailyn Luna as Margareth
- Joseph Bitangcol as King

Recurring cast

- Benjie Paras as Badong
- Janice de Belen as Ms. Malinis
- Rio Locsin as Myrna
- John Arcilla as Buboy's dad
- Eunice "Charming" Lagusad as Nikki
- Justin Plummer as Jiro

== Accolades ==
Accolades received by Boys Nxt Door
Year	Award	Category	Recipient	Result	Ref.
2007	21st PMPC Star Awards for Television	Best Youth Oriented Program	Boys Nxt Door	Nominated	
2008	22nd PMPC Star Awards for Television	Best Youth Oriented Program	Boys Nxt Door	Nominated	
