= StarStruck (Philippine TV program) =

Philippine television reality show

- Season 7 title card
- Genre: Reality competition
- Presented by: Dingdong Dantes
- Country of origin: Philippines
- Original language: Tagalog
- No. of seasons: 7
- No. of episodes: 538

Production
- Executive producers: Wilma Galvante; Reylie F. Manalo
- Production locations: GMA Broadway Centrum, New Manila, Quezon City, Philippines (2003–07, 2009–10); GMA Network Studio Annex, Quezon City, Philippines (2015, 2019)
- Camera setup: Multiple-camera setup
- Running time: 30–120 minutes
- Production company: GMA Entertainment Group

Original release
- Network: GMA Network
- Release: October 27, 2003 – September 15, 2019

Related
- StarStruck Kids

StarStruck is a Philippine television reality competition show broadcast by GMA Network. Originally hosted by Dingdong Dantes and Nancy Castiglione, it premiered on October 27, 2003 on the network's Telebabad line up. The show has aired seven seasons and 538 episodes. Dantes and Jennylyn Mercado served as the hosts for the show's most recent season. It is the longest running reality show of GMA Network.

A television spin-off, StarStruck Kids aired in 2004.

== Hosts ==
Hosts

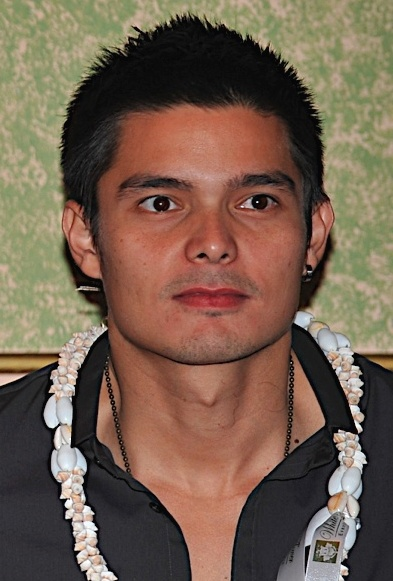
Dingdong Dantes

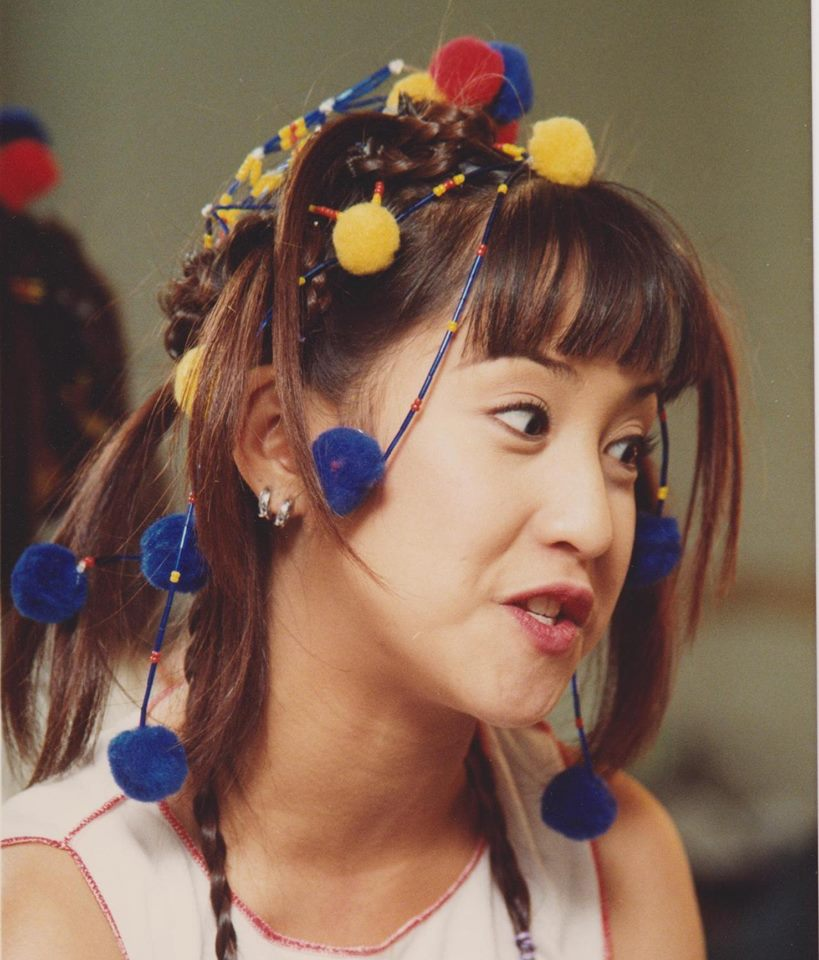
Jolina Magdangal

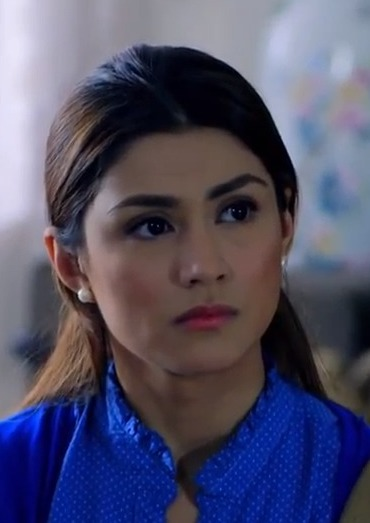
Carla Abellana

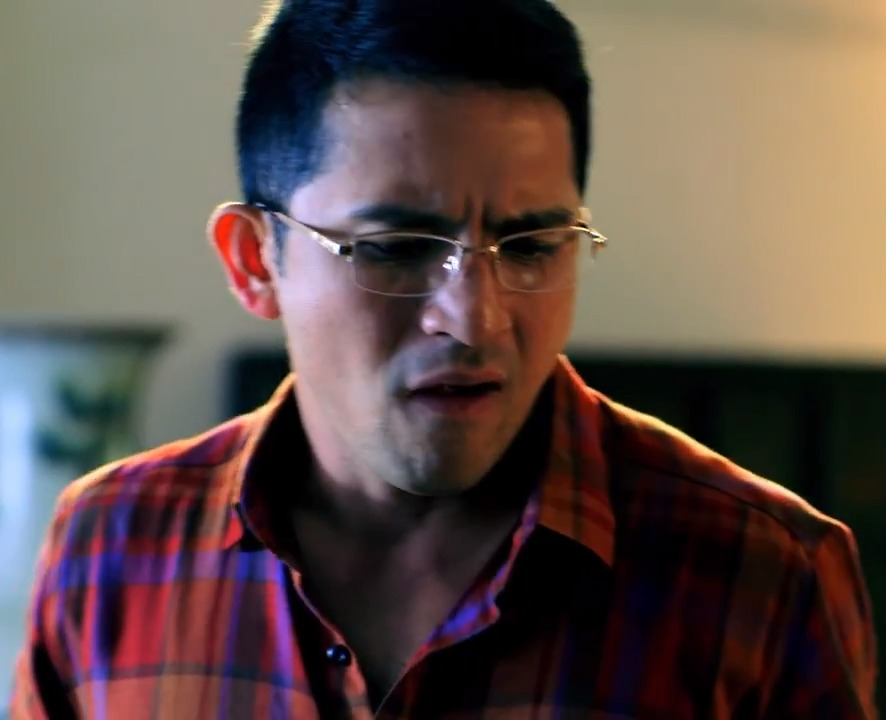
Dennis Trillo

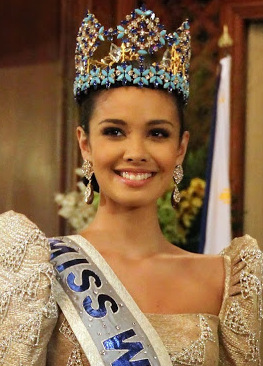
Megan Young

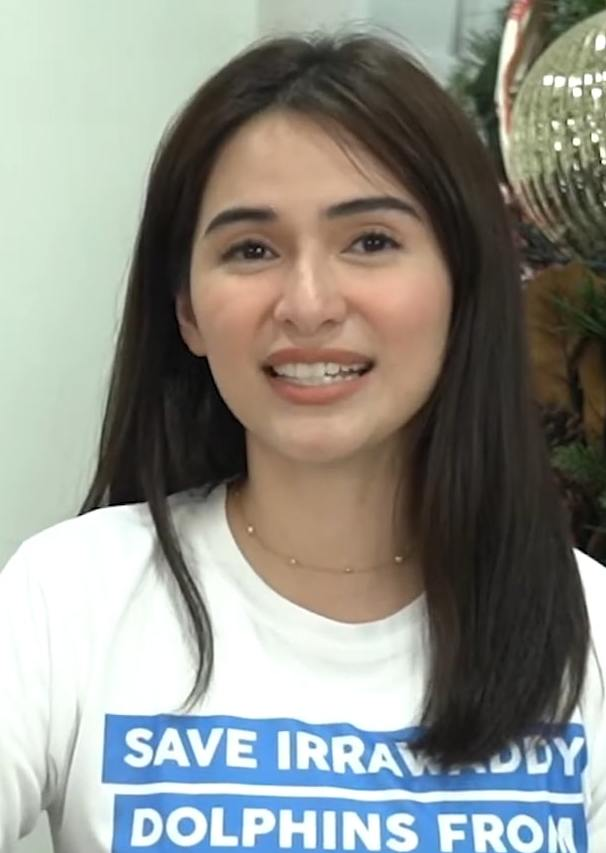
Jennylyn Mercado

- Dingdong Dantes (2003–07, 2009–10, 2015, 2019)
- Nancy Castiglione (2003–04, 2010)
- Jolina Magdangal (2004–07)
- Raymond Gutierrez (2004–07, 2009–10)
- Carla Abellana (2009–10)
- Dennis Trillo (2009–10)
- Megan Young (2015)
- Jennylyn Mercado (2019)

Segment hosts

- Mark Herras (2009–10, 2015)
- LJ Reyes (2009–10)
- Arci Muñoz (2009–10)
- Paulo Avelino (2009–10)
- Miguel Tanfelix (2015)
- Kris Bernal (2015)
- Rocco Nacino (2015)
- Kyline Alcantara (2019)

== Judges ==
Judges

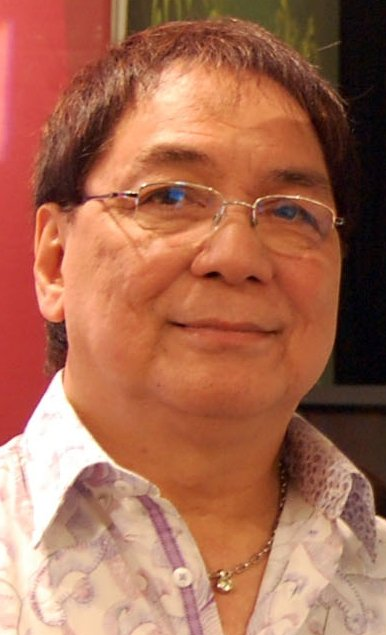
Joey de Leon

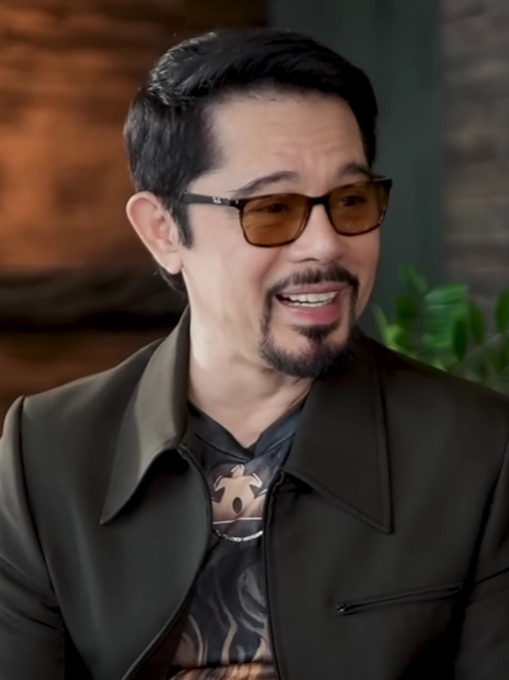
Christopher de Leon

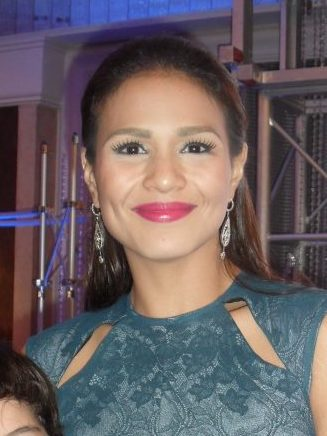
Iza Calzado

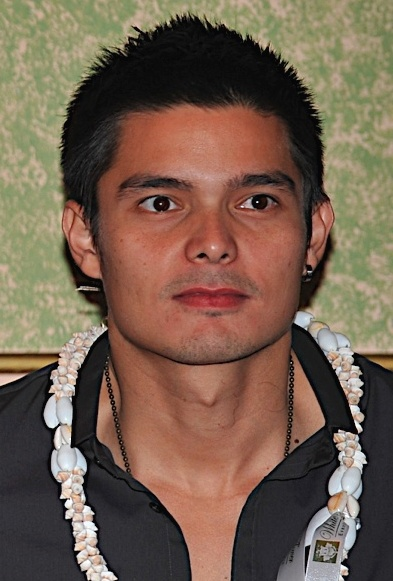
Dingdong Dantes

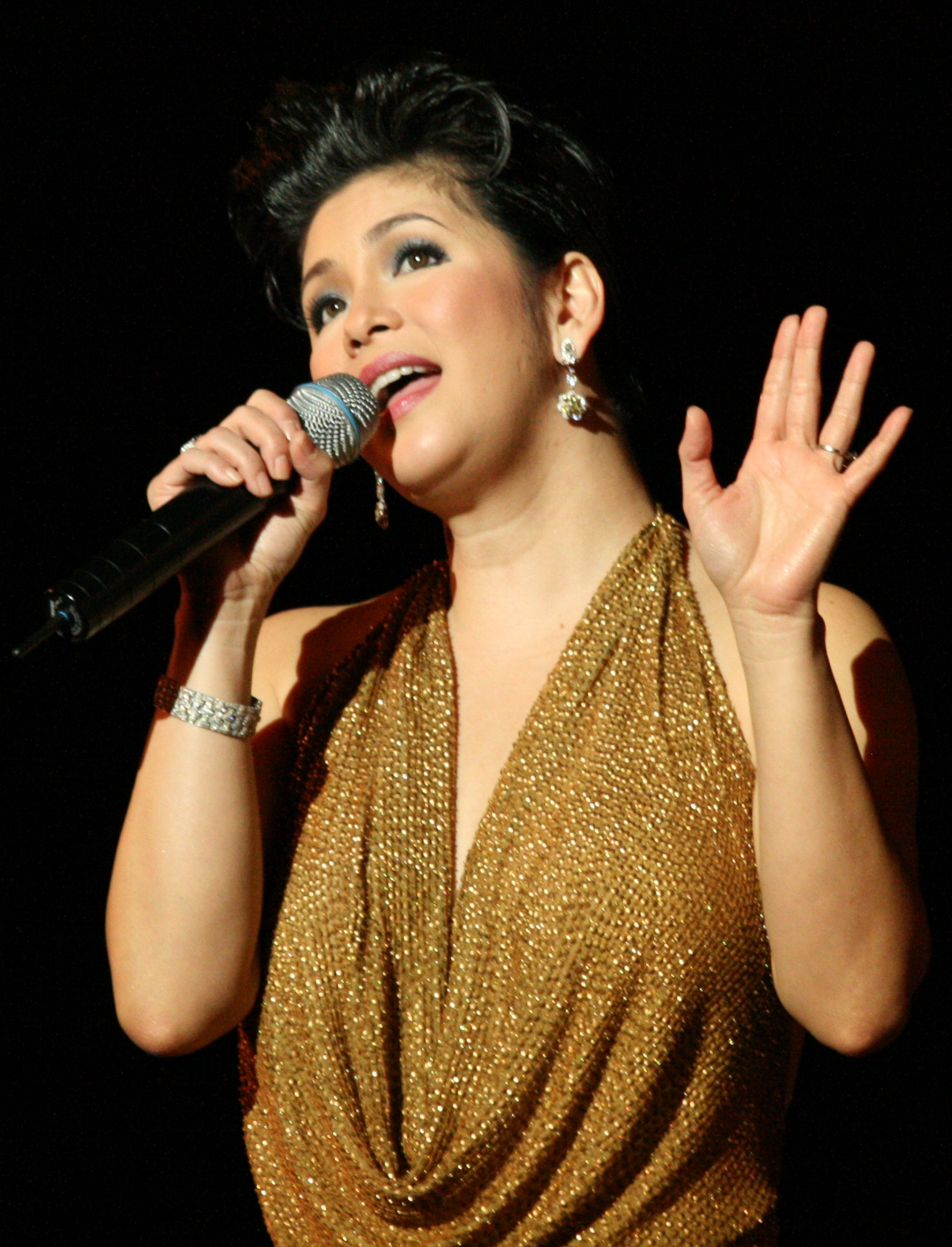
Regine Velasquez

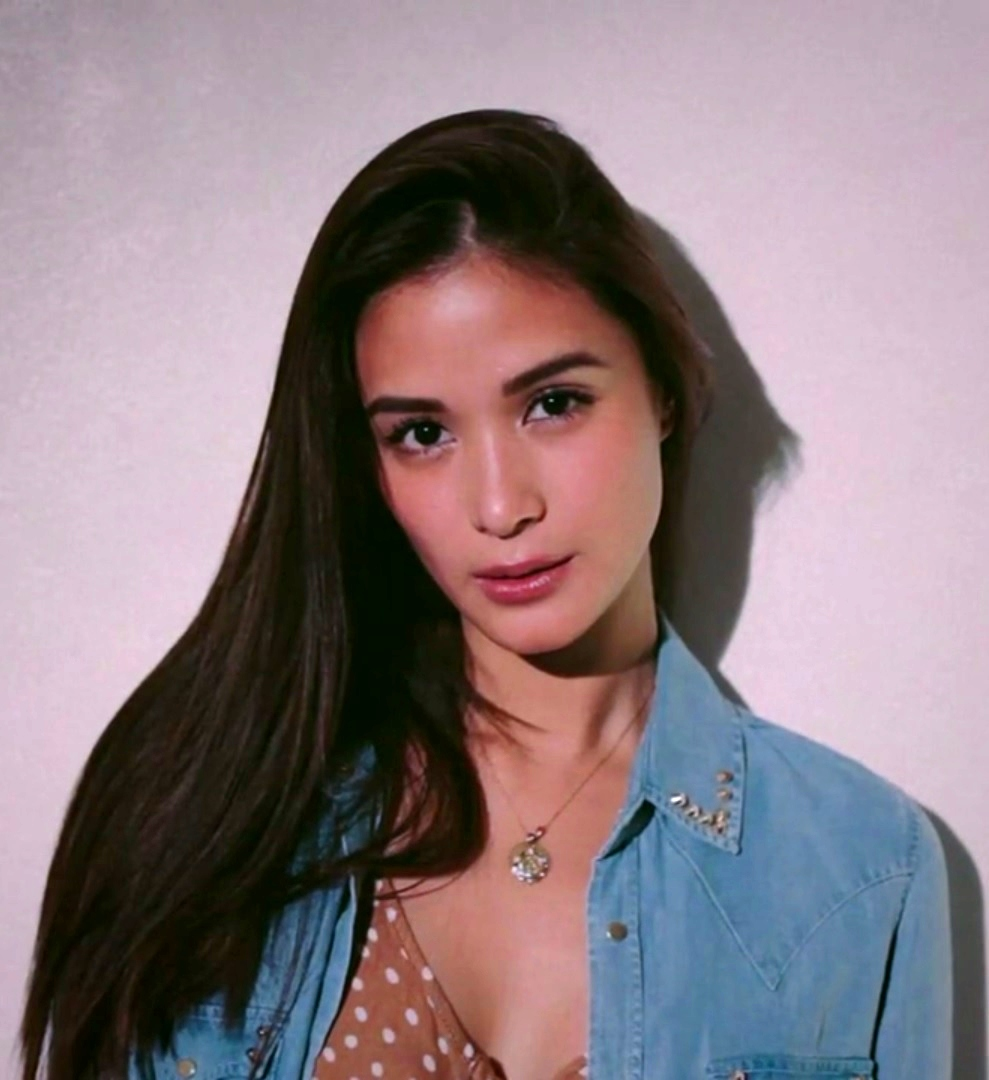
Heart Evangelista

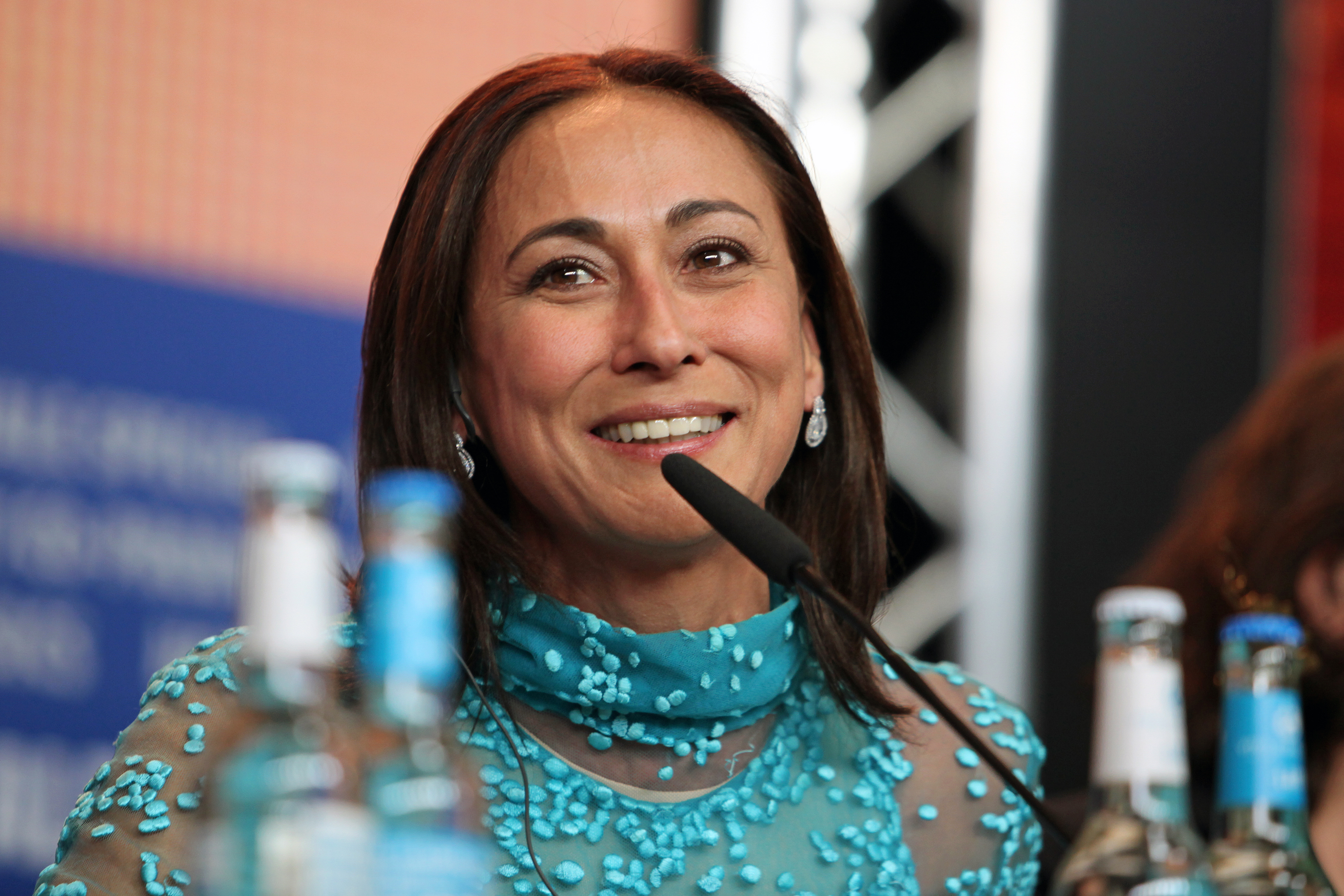
Cherie Gil

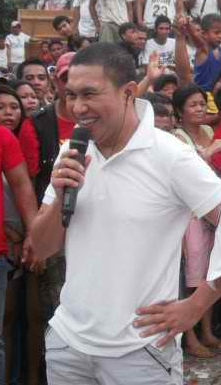
Jose Manalo

- Joey de Leon (2003–06, 2015)
- Joyce E. Bernal (2003–04)
- Ida Henares (2003–05)
- Christopher de Leon (2004–05)
- Louie Ignacio (2004–07)
- Lorna Tolentino (2005–07)
- Douglas Quijano (2006–07)
- Floy Quintos (2009–10)
- Lolit Solis (2009–10)
- Sunshine Dizon (2009)
- Iza Calzado (2009–10)
- Jennylyn Mercado (2015)
- Regine Velasquez (2015)
- Dingdong Dantes (2015)
- Heart Evangelista (2019)
- Cherie Gil (2019)
- Jose Manalo (2019)

== Seasons ==
Seasons of StarStruck
Season	Premiere	Finale	Episodes	Finalists	Ultimate Male Survivor	Ultimate Female Survivor	First Prince	First Princess	Second Prince
1	October 27, 2003	February 1, 2004	71	30 14	Mark Herras	Jennylyn Mercado	Rainier Castillo	Yasmien Kurdi	—N/a
2	October 11, 2004	February 20, 2005	96	30 14	Mike Tan	Ryza Cenon	CJ Muere	LJ Reyes	—N/a
3	November 28, 2005	March 12, 2006	77	20 14	Marky Cielo (Ultimate Sole Survivor)	Jackie Rice	Gian Carlos	Iwa Moto	—N/a
4	December 4, 2006	March 25, 2007	91	80 20	Aljur Abrenica (Ultimate Hunk) Mart Escudero (Ultimate Love Team)	Jewel Mische (Ultimate Sweetheart) Kris Bernal (Ultimate Love Team)	Prince Stefan	Rich Asuncion	—N/a
5	November 15, 2009	February 21, 2010	99	68 14	Steven Silva	Sarah Lahbati	Enzo Pineda	Diva Montelaba	Rocco Nacino
6	September 7, 2015	December 19, 2015	76	35 14	Migo Adecer	Klea Pineda	Elyson De Dios	Ayra Mariano	—N/a
7	June 15, 2019	September 15, 2019	28	22 14	Kim de Leon	Shayne Sava	Allen Ansay	Lexi Gonzales	—N/a

=== Season 1 ===
The first season of StarStruck, premiered on October 27, 2003. Hosted by Dingdong Dantes and Nancy Castiglione, The council was composed of Joey de Leon, Joyce Bernal and Ida Henares. The season ended with 71 episodes on February 1, 2004.

The first ever Ultimate Survivors were Mark Herras of San Pablo City, Laguna as the Ultimate Male Survivor and Jennylyn Mercado of Las Piñas as the Ultimate Female Survivor.

=== Season 2 ===
The second season of StarStruck, premiered on October 11, 2004. Hosted by Dingdong Dantes with the StarStruck Kids host, Jolina Magdangal, The council was composed of Joey de Leon, Christopher de Leon and Louie Ignacio. There were slight changes made in the council, Joyce Bernal was replaced by Louie Ignacio. The season ended with 96 episodes on February 20, 2005.

The Ultimate Survivors were Mike Tan of Angono, Rizal as the Ultimate Male Survivor and Ryza Cenon of Gapan, Nueva Ecija as the Ultimate Female Survivor.

=== Season 3 ===
The third season of StarStruck, also known as StarStruck: The Nationwide Invasion premiered on November 28, 2005. Hosted by Dingdong Dantes, Jolina Magdangal and Raymond Gutierrez, The council was composed of Joey de Leon, Louie Ignacio and Lorna Tolentino. The season ended with 77 episodes on March 12, 2006.

The Ultimate Survivors were Marky Cielo of Bauko, Mountain Province as the Ultimate Male Survivor and Jackie Rice of Olongapo City, Zambales as the Ultimate Female Survivor. Cielo also became the Ultimate Sole Survivor.

=== Season 4 ===
The fourth season of StarStruck, also known as StarStruck: The Next Level premiered on December 4, 2006. Hosted by Dingdong Dantes, Jolina Magdangal and Raymond Gutierrez, The council was composed of Louie Ignacio, Lorna Tolentino and Douglas Quiano. The season ended with 91 episodes on March 25, 2007.

The title of Ultimate Survivors were won by Jewel Mische of Bocaue, Bulacan as the Ultimate Sweetheart, Aljur Abrenica of Angeles City, Pampanga as the Ultimate Hunk, and Mart Escudero of General Mariano Alvarez, Cavite and Kris Bernal of Quezon City as the Ultimate Loveteam.

=== Season 5 ===
The fifth season of StarStruck, also known as StarStruck V premiered on November 15, 2009. Hosted by Raymond Gutierrez, Carla Abellana and Dennis Trillo. Carla Abellana replaced Jolina Magdangal for this season, while Dennis Trillo replaced Dingdong Dantes, as the latter replaced Richard Gomez.

The regular daily show became a daily update show that focused on the lives of the contestants and their activities and tests on the show. It was hosted by the show's the segment hosts are StarStruck graduates with Mark Herras, LJ Reyes, Arci Muñoz and Paulo Avelino. They serve as StarStruck Shoutout, who is tasked to join the hopefuls as they go through every phase of the competition, it premiered on November 15, 2009. The council was composed of Lolit Solis, Floy Quintos and Iza Calzado act as the members of the council. Sunshine Dizon, was first reported to be part of the council in the place of Iza Calzado but had to turn down the offer due to health problems.

The five mentors were from the Acting mentor; Gina Alajar, Dance mentor; Douglas Nierras, Singing mentor; Jai Sabas-Aracama, Grooming and Make-up mentor; Barbi Chan and the Image mentor; Abbygale Arrenas de Leon. Also featured many fives: The Factor V, The V Mentors, The V Hosts together with Dingdong Dantes and Nancy Castiglione in the Final Judgment day, The Final V, and a 5 million dollars’ worth of prizes for the Ultimate Survivors. The season ended with 99 episodes on February 21, 2010.

The Ultimate Survivors were Steven Silva of Davao City as the Ultimate Male Survivor and Sarah Lahbati of Dasmariñas, Cavite as the Ultimate Female Survivor.

=== Season 6 ===
The sixth season of StarStruck, premiered on September 7, 2015. Hosted by Dingdong Dantes (Note: Dantes also acts as the council member in this season.) and Megan Young, The segment hosts are StarStruck graduates Mark Herras, Miguel Tanfelix, Kris Bernal, and Rocco Nacino, and they serve as journey hosts, who are tasked to join the hopefuls as they go through every phase of the competition. The council was composed of Joey de Leon, Regine Velasquez-Alcasid, Jennylyn Mercado and Dingdong Dantes. The season ended with 76 episodes on December 19, 2015.

The Ultimate Survivors were Migo Adecer of Mandaluyong as the Ultimate Male Survivor and Klea Pineda of Caloocan as the Ultimate Female Survivor.

=== Season 7 ===
The seventh season of StarStruck, premiered on June 15, 2019. Hosted by Dingdong Dantes and Jennylyn Mercado. Kyline Alcantara served as host of Inside StarStruck on YouTube. The council was composed of Heart Evangelista, Cherie Gil and Jose Manalo. It was directed by Monti Parungao and Rommel Gacho. The season ended with 28 episodes on September 15, 2019.

The Ultimate Survivors were Shayne Sava of Binangonan, Rizal as the Ultimate Female Survivor and Kim de Leon of Balayan, Batangas as the Ultimate Male Survivor.

== Accolades ==
Accolades received by StarStruck
Year	Award	Category	Recipient	Result	Ref.
2004	18th PMPC Star Awards for Television	Best Talent Search Program	StarStruck	Won	
2004	18th PMPC Star Awards for Television	Best Talent Search Program Host	Dingdong Dantes Nancy Castiglione	Nominated	
2004	18th PMPC Star Awards for Television	Best Talent Search Program	StarStruck Kids	Nominated	
2004	18th PMPC Star Awards for Television	Best Talent Search Program Host	Jolina Magdangal	Won	
2005	Golden Screen TV Awards	Outstanding Reality/Competition Program	StarStruck	Nominated	
2006	20th PMPC Star Awards for Television	Best Talent Search Program	StarStruck: The Nationwide Invasion	Won	
2006	20th PMPC Star Awards for Television	Best Talent Search Program Host	Dingdong Dantes Jolina Magdangal Raymond Gutierrez	Nominated	
2007	Asian Television Awards	Best Talent Search Program	StarStruck: The Nationwide Invasion	Nominated	
2007	21st PMPC Star Awards for Television	Best Talent Search Program	StarStruck: The Next Level	Won	
2007	21st PMPC Star Awards for Television	Best Talent Search Program Host	Dingdong Dantes Jolina Magdangal Raymond Gutierrez	Won	
2010	24th PMPC Star Awards for Television	Best Reality Talent Search Program	StarStruck V	Nominated	
2016	30th PMPC Star Awards for Television	Best Talent Search Program and Best Music TV Award	StarStruck VI	Won	
2016	30th PMPC Star Awards for Television	Best Talent Search Program Host	Dingdong Dantes Megan Young	Nominated	
