= Bantatay =

Philippine television drama series

- Title card
- Also known as: The Guardian
- Genre: Comedy drama; Fantasy
- Directed by: Don Michael Perez
- Creative director: Jun Lana
- Starring: Raymart Santiago
- Theme music composer: 6 Cycle Mind
- Opening theme: "Biglaan" by Jay Perillo
- Country of origin: Philippines
- Original language: Tagalog
- No. of episodes: 115

Production
- Executive producer: Joseph T. Aleta
- Camera setup: Multiple-camera setup
- Running time: 17–27 minutes
- Production company: GMA Entertainment TV

Original release
- Network: GMA Network
- Release: September 20, 2010 – February 25, 2011

Bantatay (international title: The Guardian) is a Philippine television drama comedy fantasy series broadcast by GMA Network. The series was inspired by the 1995 film Fluke and 1999 sitcom 100 Deeds for Eddie McDowd. Directed by Don Michael Perez, it stars Raymart Santiago in the title role. It premiered on September 20, 2010 on the network's Telebabad line up. The series concluded on February 25, 2011, with a total of 115 episodes.

The series is streaming online on YouTube.

== Cast and characters ==
Cast

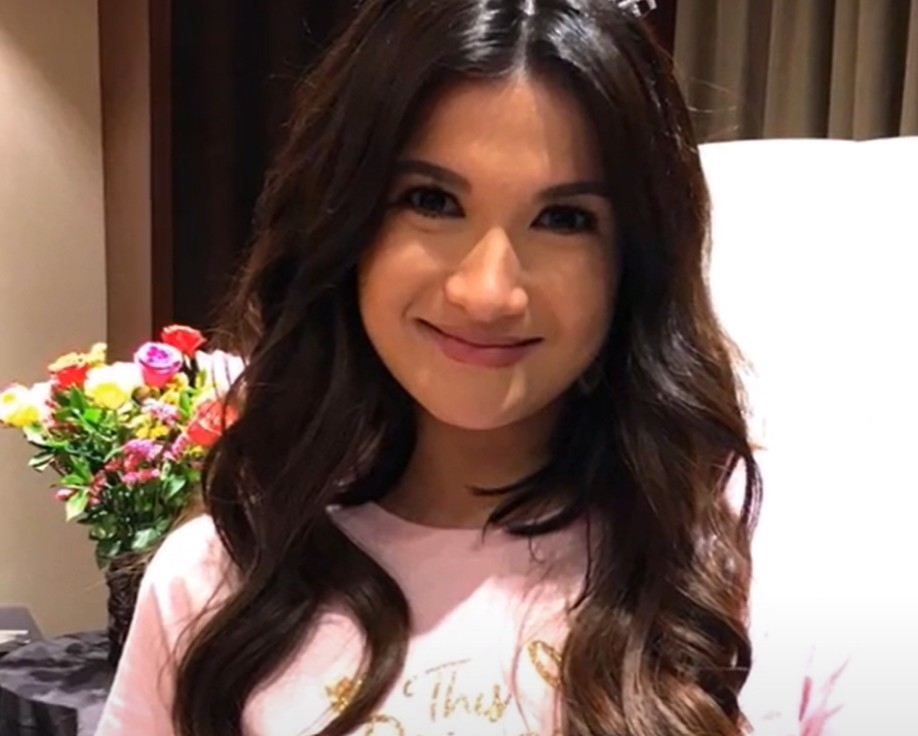
Camille Prats

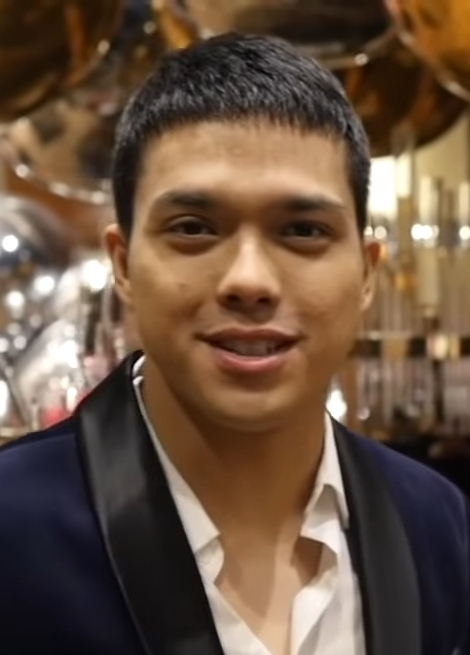
Elmo Magalona

Lead cast

- Raymart Santiago as Bernard Razon

Supporting cast

- Gelli de Belen as Marcella Razon
- Camille Prats as Daisy Razon
- Krystal Reyes as Emily Razon
- Renz Valerio as Junix Razon
- Sweet Ramos as Farrah Razon
- Jennica Garcia as Joanna
- Carl Guevarra as Norbert
- Charlie Einstein of Rabanal as Bantatay
- Gary Estrada as Simon Gonzales
- Elmo Magalona as Arthur "Artie" Enriquez
- Marissa Delgado as Clarita Enriquez
- Prince Stefan as Calvin Gonzales
- Eva Darren as Vangie Razon
- Kier Legaspi as Baldo
- Al Tantay as Rigor
- Sabrina Man as Princess
- Isabel Frial as Len Len

Guest cast

- Claudine Barreto as Shiela
- Sandy Andolong as Alma
- Nadine Samonte as Angel
- Christopher de Leon as Bart
- James Blanco as Dexter
- Benjie Paras as Jace
- Bernadette Allyson as Mrs. Gomez
- Lander Vera Perez as Mr. Gomez
- Joko Diaz as Kanor
- Rico Barrera as Ato
- Janna Dominguez as Cat 1
- Cara Eriguel as Cat 2
- Mel Kimura as Maria
- Rita Avila as Clarita
- Sylvia Sanchez as Corazon
- Carla Abellana as Krissa
- Jan Marini as Charlene

Voice cast

- Jaya
- John Lapus
- Rhian Ramos
- Michael V.
- Ruby Rodriguez
- Jillian Ward
- Gladys Guevarra
- Mura

== Ratings ==
According to AGB Nielsen Philippines' Mega Manila People/Individual television ratings, the pilot episode of Bantatay earned a 12.5% rating. The final episode scored an 8.8% rating.

== Accolades ==
Accolades received by Bantatay
Year	Award	Category	Recipient	Result	Ref.
2010	Lingkod TV Awards	Most Entertaining Child Friendly Show	Bantatay	Won	
