= Steven Silva =

Filipino chef and actor

- Born: Steven Joseph Silva (Note: Steven Silva was born in the United States of America. Thus, he does not possess his mother's maiden name which is Lao.); November 27, 1986 (age 39); Oceanside, California, United States
- Other names: The Boy, Shiruba, Shirubang
- Occupations: Actor, dancer, chef, footballer, radio disk jockey
- Years active: 2009–2016
- Agent: GMA Artist Center (2009–2016)
- Known for: Starstruck
- Height: 5 ft 9 in (175 cm)

Steven Joseph Silva (born November 27, 1986, in Oceanside, California) is a Filipino-American footballer from Team Socceroo FC in the UFL Second Division. He is also an actor, chef, radio disk jockey, and the Ultimate Male Survivor of the fifth season of StarStruck. He is half-Portuguese, one-fourth Chinese and one-fourth Filipino. He is the first Mindanao representative and the oldest male contestant to win the said title.

== Biography ==
=== Early life and career beginnings ===
Steven Silva was born in Oceanside, California, to an American father of Portuguese descent and a Filipino-Chinese mother who hails from Davao, where he auditioned for StarStruck. He was raised in Sacramento, California, and attended Sacramento City College for his college education. After a few years there he opted for a career in the culinary field and later attended the California Culinary Academy in San Francisco.

=== 2009–2010: StarStruck ===
While he was completing his foreign internship at the Marco Polo Hotel in Davao as required by the California Culinary Academy in order to graduate, he auditioned for the show by participating in an audition at SM Davao.

Silva was among the hundreds who made it to the callbacks for Manila. He represented Davao.

During the 3rd factor week, Silva had the weakest performance among the remaining boys in the competition. But due to the twist of 3rd factor which gives a different weight of criteria, Silva survived the said week. On the other hand, the result went to Piero Vergara as the latest avenger by then with Princess Snell. Steven admitted that if it was not because of the twist, he knew that he will be sent home instead of Vergara.

His female counterpart in winning the title is Sarah Lahbati.

=== 2010–2014: Post-StarStruck ===
Right after winning the title, Silva and Sarah Lahbati started to appear in numerous shows of GMA. They also performed in the final episode of SOP. After several weeks, Steven became part of Party Pilipinas. Enzo Pineda, Diva Montelaba, Sarah Lahbati, and Silva starred in the Philippine drama anthology and romantic television show, Love Bug series in the episode "Exchange of Hearts". Silva also shared his comedic capabilities as an actor in Bubble Gang and Kaya ng Powers as a guest. And in October 2010, Silva starred in his first lead man role and his biggest break yet with Rocco Nacino, opposite Kris Bernal, in the afternoon soap, Koreana, as Joshua Lee, a rich bachelor who manages the restaurants of a Korean business tycoon Chang Hee-Jung (portrayed by Eddie Garcia).

In mid-2011, Silva starred as John in his first primetime series, Time of My Life. He portrayed the role as the boyfriend of Zaira (portrayed by LJ Reyes). Steven had a supporting role in this series but he said that Rocco Nacino and Mark Herras are the perfect lead men since the said show is all about dancing.

2012 proved to be the busiest year so far for Steven. He portrayed the role of Stripe in the Young Artists Production's staging of Trina Paulus' novel Hope for the Flowers. Frencheska Farr, on the other hand, played the female lead role. The reason behind Silva's inclusion in the said stage play is because of his singing ability in Party Pilipinas. The producers of the stage play like his singing in the said musical variety show ended up asking Steven to audition. He served his friend, Gian Magdangal, as his inspiration in the play because Magdangal starred in the 2011 play, Rent. He admitted he was hesitant to accept the project when Young Artists Production first offered him the role but later on decided that he was ready to try something new. Being a neophyte in the world of musical theater was not an excuse for Steven for he proved to everyone that the role of Stripe suited him perfectly.

Silva was seen in the Filipino teen-oriented drama series, Together Forever, led by Elmo Magalona and Julie Anne San Jose, as Cholo. In August 2012, Steven also starred in his first film, entitled Just One Summer also led by Magalona and San Jose. In the last quarter of 2012, Silva was part of the Filipino version of Coffee Prince where he portrayed Bamboo, a friend of Errol (portrayed by Benjamin Alves). The role of Bamboo was not in the original series.

In January 2013, Silva became a part of the second epicserye of GMA Network, Indio, with Senator Bong Revilla Jr. as the lead character. Indio premiered on January 14, 2013. He played the role of Ribung Linti, the god of lightning and thunder. After Indio, Steven is currently seen as Tisoy in another Rocco Nacino – Lovi Poe tandem series, Akin Pa Rin ang Bukas, as Jerry's (Nacino) buddy. On July, Steven started to become part of Sunday All Stars.

=== 2014–present: Theater, musical, and a Wattpad series ===
In late 2013, Silva was announced as one of the newest characters in the spin-off of The Kitchen Musical entitled The Boston. For the audition on the said series, Steven said, "The audition experience for The Boston was really nerve-wracking and long, but in the end, it was completely worth it. My first audition was conducted in September 2013. After numerous callbacks, I learned I was part of the final cast. It was a very thorough process and I could tell they really wanted to make sure that each character was to be filled by the right actor." He played the role of Sid which is considered to be an intriguing character of the series. He adds, "The character I play in The Boston is named ‘Sid’ and he is the pastry chef in the restaurant. He is one of the more skilled chefs in the kitchen, yet he is very soft-spoken and doesn't necessarily take command even though he is more than qualified to do so. He is also very particular to his sense of style and physical upkeep and appearance. In a sense, he is very metrosexual and very mysterious so some folks suspect he's gay, yet no one really knows the truth." The eight-episode chef themed television series aired through the Lifestyle Network.

While Silva is portraying his role in The Boston, he becomes part of the lifestyle and food show Taste Buddies. The show is being aired in GMA News TV with Solenn Heussaff and Isabelle Daza. Steven serves as a segment host. The show is all about exploring the wonders of the food in the whole country. Iya Villania replaced Daza as Solenn's partner when Isabelle Daza transferred to ABS-CBN.

In early 2015, Silva became part of the musical theater, La Cage aux Folles, where he portrayed the role of Jean-Michel. Jean-Michel is Georges' son from a short-lived affair twenty-four years ago. Georges is the character of the veteran actor, Michael De Mesa. The show's director, Robbie Guevarra, gave the role of Jean-Michel to Steven when Steven was singing during the Grease's rehearsal in 2014. That was the moment Guevarra told Santi Santamaria, 9 Works Theatrical’s executive producer, that he wanted Silva to portray the said role. Steven auditioned by singing 'Beauty School Dropout' and subsequently getting the role.

La Cage aux Folles premiered on February 28, 2015, with a standing ovation from the members of the press. The musical was shown at the Carlos P Romulo Auditorium in RCBC Plaza with Audie Gemora starring as Albin. The show was produced by 9 Works Theatrical, with direction by Robbie Guevara and scenography by Mio Infante. Silva impressed the audience with his powerful singing voice and confidence, holding his own against the acclaimed veterans of the cast.

== Personal life ==
Silva started to reside in Quezon City after winning, leaving his family in Sacramento, California, while he continues to pursue his dream of success in the Philippine world of showbiz.

In 2012, Silva admitted that he and his batch mate, Diva Montelaba are in an "almost-one-year" relationship.

== Filmography ==
=== Film ===
Year	Title	Role	Note/s
2012	Just One Summer	Joseph	

=== Television ===
Year	Title	Role	Note/s
2009–2010	StarStruck V	Himself	won as the "Ultimate Male Survivor"
2010	Love Bug Presents: Exchange of Hearts	Tim	Episode guest
2010	Kaya ng Powers	Carlo	Guest cast
2010–2013	Party Pilipinas	Himself	
2010–2011	Koreana	Joshua Lee	
2011	Time of My Life	John	
2012	Tween Hearts	Leo	Guest cast
2012	H.O.T. TV	Himself	Episode guest
2012	Together Forever	Cholo Limuanco	
2012	Coffee Prince	Bamboo Buendia	
2013	Indio	Ribung Linti	
2013	Maynila	Homer	"Summer of Love" episode
2013	Maynila	Alex	"Coffee Princess" episode
2013	Sunday All Stars	Himself/Performer	
2013	Akin Pa Rin ang Bukas	Tisoy	
2014	The Boston	Sid	The Kitchen Musical spin-off
2014	Taste Buddies	Segment host	Together with Solenn Heussaff and Iya Villania
2015–2016	Wattpad Presents	Various	His first show outside of GMA Network
2016	Mars	Episode Guest	Last TV appearance

=== Theater ===
Year	Title	Role	Note/s
2012	Hope for the Flowers	Stripe	Lead role with Frencheska Farr
2014	Grease	Johnny Casino	
2015	La Cage aux Folles	Jean-Michel	

== See also ==
- Mark Herras
- Mike Tan
- Marky Cielo
- Aljur Abrenica

== Notes ==
Awards and achievements
Preceded by Aljur Abrenica	StarStruck; 2009 (season 5)	Succeeded by Migo Adecer
