= Rox Montealegre =

Filipino actress

Roxanne Montealegre
- Born: April 4, 1990 (age 36); Manila, Philippines
- Other names: Roxanne, Rox
- Occupation: Actress
- Years active: 2009–present
- Agent: GMA Artist Center (2009–2015)
- Spouse: Mark Luz (m. 2020)
- Children: 2

Roxanne Chan Montealegre-Luz (born April 4, 1990), better known simply as Rox Montealegre, is a Filipina actress and a finalist of Starstruck V. In 2011, she played the role of Lyka in the drama My Lover, My Wife, starring Maxene Magalona, Luis Alandy, Nadine Samonte, and Marco Alcaraz. She was a former talent of GMA Artist Center and currently serving as a TV host.

== Filmography ==
=== Television ===
Year	Title	Role
2009	Kung Aagawin Mo Ang Lahat Sa Akin	Sabrine
2009–2010	StarStruck	Herself
2010	Kaya ng Powers	Monique
2011	My Lover, My Wife	Lyka
2011	Captain Barbell Ang Pagbabalik	Edith/Aswang
2011–2012	Kokak	Lileth
2012	Hiram na Puso	Amanda
2012	Kasalanan Bang Ibigin Ka?	Karen
2012	My Daddy Dearest	Cheerleader #1
2013	Forever	Maggie
2015	Kailan Ba Tama ang Mali?	Ayla
2015	NCAA Season 91	Courtside reporter
2016	NCAA Season 92	Courtside reporter
2017	NCAA Season 93	Courtside reporter
2018	NCAA Season 94	Courtside reporter
2019	Maharlika Pilipinas Basketball League	Courtside reporter
2019–2020	Umagang Kay Ganda	Guest host
