= Kaya ng Powers =

2010 Philippine television sitcom series

- Title card
- Genre: Sitcom; Fantasy
- Directed by: Uro dela Cruz
- Starring: Rhian Ramos; Sheena Halili; Elmo Magalona; Rufa Mae Quinto; Joey Marquez
- Country of origin: Philippines
- Original language: Tagalog
- No. of episodes: 17

Production
- Executive producer: Wilma Galvante
- Camera setup: Multiple-camera setup
- Running time: 30–45 minutes
- Production company: GMA Entertainment TV

Original release
- Network: GMA Network
- Release: July 24 – November 13, 2010

Kaya ng Powers (transl. powers can) is a 2010 Philippine television fantasy sitcom series broadcast by GMA Network. Directed by Uro dela Cruz, it stars Rhian Ramos, Sheena Halili, Elmo Magalona, Joey Marquez and Rufa Mae Quinto. It premiered on July 24, 2010. The series concluded on November 13, 2010, with a total of 17 episodes.

== Cast and characters ==
Cast

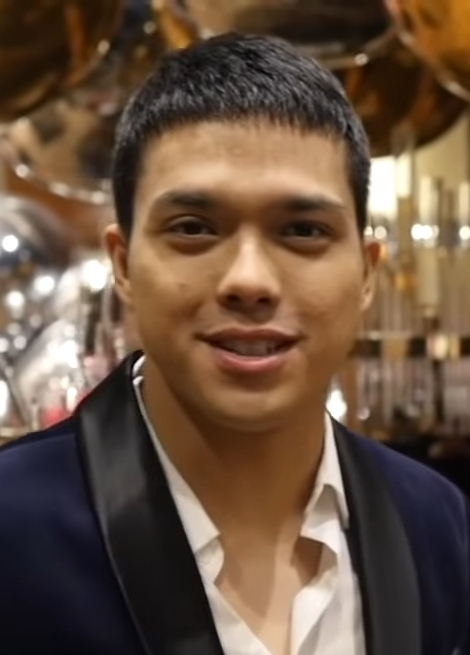
Elmo Magalona

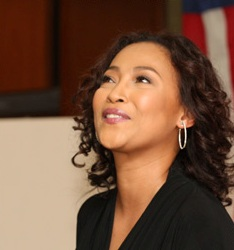
Jaya

Lead cast

- Rhian Ramos as Hillary Jackson Powers
- Sheena Halili as Shalani Jackson Powers
- Elmo Magalona as Gustin Jackson Powers
- Jillian Ward as Janna Jackson Powers
- Joey Marquez as Robert Esteban Powers
- Rufa Mae Quinto as Margaret Jackson Powers

Supporting cast

- Jaya Ramsey as Helen Heneres
- Dang Cruz as Alfreda
- Rocco Nacino as Clinton Llib
- Enzo Pineda as Noy Aquino
- Diego Llorico as Bebe Girl
- Elijah Alejo as Amferia Amfon "Amfi" Heneres
- Alyssa Alano as Eva Eugenia
- Bearwin Meily as Donald Thaught

Guest cast

- Daniel Matsunaga as Lineman
- John Lapus as Tuod Gay
- Sam Pinto as Samantha
- Fabio Ide as Max
- Katrina Halili as Carlotta
- Sarah Lahbati as Clarisse
- Rox Montealegre as Monique
- Barbie Forteza as Bambi
- Steven Silva as Carlo
- Tado Jimenez as Raco
- Luis Alandy as Rico
- German Moreno as Germs
- Jenny Miller as Maureen
- Julian Trono as Mac
- Aljur Abrenica

== Ratings ==
According to AGB Nielsen Philippines' Mega Manila People/Individual television ratings, the final episode of Kaya ng Powers scored a 7.5% rating.
