= StarStruck season 5 =

Season of a Philippine television reality show

StarStruck
- Season 5
- Title card 2009
- No. of episodes: 99

Release
- Original network: GMA Network
- Original release: November 15, 2009 – February 21, 2010

Season chronology
- ← Previous; Season 4 Next → Season 6

The fifth season of StarStruck, also known as StarStruck V, is a Philippine television reality talent competition show. It was broadcast on GMA Network. Hosted by Raymond Gutierrez, Carla Abellana and Dennis Trillo. Abellana replaced Jolina Magdangal for this season, while former replaced Dingdong Dantes, as the former replaced Richard Gomez, who will run as representative of the 4th district of the Province of Leyte as host of the game show Family Feud.

Major changes happened on the show. The regular daily show became a daily update show that focused on the lives of the contestants and their activities and tests on the show. It was hosted by the show's the segment hosts are StarStruck graduates with Mark Herras, LJ Reyes, Arci Muñoz and Paulo Avelino. They serve as StarStruck Shoutout, who is tasked to join the hopefuls as they go through every phase of the competition, it premiered on November 15, 2009. The council was composed of Lolit Solis, Floy Quintos and Iza Calzado act as the members of the Sunshine Dizon was first reported to be part of the council in the place of Iza Calzado but had to turn down the offer due to health problems.

The five mentors are from Acting mentor; Gina Alajar, Dance mentor; Douglas Nierras, Singing mentor; Jai Sabas-Aracama, Grooming and Make-up mentor; Barbi Chan and Image mentor; Abbygale Arrenas de Leon. Also featured many fives: The Factor V, The V Mentors, The V Hosts together with Dingdong Dantes and Nancy Castiglione in the Final Judgment day, The Final V, and a 5 million pesos’ worth of prizes for the Ultimate Survivors. The season ended with 99 episodes on February 21, 2010, having Steven Silva and Sarah Lahbati as the Ultimate Survivors.

The series is streaming online on YouTube.

== Overview ==
=== Auditions ===
Key cities for the auditions.

In the last quarter of 2009, GMA Network announced that the distribution of the application form will be on August 30 and would be distributed nationwide through various malls. For this season, the age limit is set from 16 to 23 years old. There was a live coverage of the said event during SOP. Much of the auditions were held at the GMA Network's headquarters and at SM Supermalls throughout the Philippines.

The following dates and cities for the auditions were as follows:

Casting Dates (2009)	Venues	Key Cities of Philippines
August 30	GMA Network	Quezon City
August 30	Stadia Dagupan	Dagupan
August 30	SM City Cebu	Cebu
August 30	SM City Iloilo	Iloilo
September 5–6	SM City Pampanga	San Fernando
September 5–6	CSI Dagupan	Dagupan
September 5–6	SM City Cebu	Cebu
September 12–13	SM City Cebu	Cebu
September 12–13	SM City Iloilo	Iloilo
September 12–13	SM City Davao	Davao
September 19–20	SM City Bacoor	Molino
September 19–20	SM City Cagayan de Oro	Cagayan de Oro
September 19–20	SM City Bacolod	Bacolod

Casting Dates (2009)	Key Countries in Asia
October 30–31	Singapore
November 7–8	Japan

Casting Dates (2009)	Key Countries in Middle East
November 3–4	Bahrain
November 5	Dubai
November 6	Abu Dhabi

Casting Dates (2009)	Key Cities of United States
November 5–6	Los Angeles
November 7–8	San Francisco
November 10–11	New Jersey

The pilot episode was aired on November 15, 2009. The new improve edition of the popular show. The StarStruck is shown everyday having Mondays to Fridays will be tests. This season there was a Saturday's edition is the performance night hosted by Raymond Gutierrez. The Sunday's edition is the elimination night hosted by Carla Abellana and Dennis Trillo. The show held its the Final Judgment on February 21, 2010 at the Araneta Coliseum.

== Selection process ==
In the fifth year of the reality-talent search, Out of numerous who auditioned nationwide, only Top 100 was chosen for the first cut. From Top 100, it was trimmed down to Top 60, then from Top 60 to Top 57. These Top 57 dreamers will undergo their first acting test segment; (No Second Chances, Only Seconds To Shine) then from Top 57, it was trimmed down to Top 30, from Top 30 down to Top 20 dreamers. But to the surprise of those chosen, eight (Top 8) more were added to the fold, including aspirants from several countries where the show conducted auditions—in line with StarStruck V's intention to go international this year, from Top 28 only final fourteen finalists will be left.

The Final 14 underwent various workshops and trainings in order to develop their personalities, talents, and charisma. But, the twist is that every week, one or two from the final fourteen may have to say goodbye but this season only five remain. Those who were eliminated were dubbed as StarStruck Avengers.

This time instead of the Final 4, but this season make it the Final V will vie for the coveted the Ultimate Survivors titles, the Ultimate Male Survivor and the Ultimate Female Survivor, both of them will received P1,500,000 pesos each plus and an exclusive management contract from GMA Network with a minimum guarantee of P3,500,000 pesos, summing up to a total prize of at least P5,000,000 pesos.

This time the three Runners-up was given for this season, the first runners-up, the First Prince and First Princess titles, and for the second runner-up, the Second Prince, both of them received P200,000 pesos each plus and an exclusive management contract from the network. The StarStruck Avengers (the losing contestants) also received an exclusive contract from the network.

It also featured new runner-up title, in StarStruck History, the Second Prince in the Final Judgment Night.

== Hopefuls ==
In this season, finally revealed of the Top 60 hopefuls where name on the show's premier last Sunday, November 15, 2009. The half of hopefuls will be eliminated the next Sunday, November 22, 2009. The remaining Top 30 hopefuls were reduced to the Top 20 hopefuls on November 25, 2009. While the remaining twenty hopefuls, they are advanced to the next round of the competition, plus the surprise additional of the Top 8 International aspirants.

These Top 28 aspirants will be face their first artista test this week under the supervision of five mentors and the council. The Top 28 will be eliminated this Sunday, November 29, 2009. The final fourteen finalists will be revealed.

When the Final 14 was chosen, they are assigned to different challenges every week that will hone their acting, singing, and dancing abilities. Every Sunday, one is meant to leave the competition until there were just six others who are left. From survivor six, there will be last who will be eliminated and after the elimination of the one; the final five will be revealed.

The Final V will be battling with each other on the Final Judgment. People will choose who they want to win the competition by online voting and text voting. 50% of the result will come from the online and text votes and the remaining 50% is from the council.

Color key:

Male contestant
Female contestant
Semi-finalist
Finalist
Runner-up
Winner

Place	Contestant	Age	Hometown	Exit	Result
1	Steven Silva	23	Davao City	February 21, 2010	Ultimate Male Survivor
2	Sarah Lahbati	16	Dasmariñas, Cavite	February 21, 2010	Ultimate Female Survivor
3	Enzo Pineda	19	Quezon City	February 21, 2010	First Prince
4	Rocco Nacino	22	Pasig	February 21, 2010	Second Prince
5	Diva Montelaba	19	Cebu City	February 21, 2010	First Princess
6	Nina Kodaka	20	Tokyo, Japan	February 14, 2010	Avenger
7	Ian Batherson	20	Mandaluyong	January 31, 2010	Avenger
8	Rox Montealegre	19	Pasig	January 24, 2010	Avenger
9	Piero Vergara	16	Cebu City	January 10, 2010	Avenger
10	Princess Snell	16	San Pedro, Laguna	January 10, 2010	Avenger
11	Sef Cadayona	20	Las Piñas	December 27, 2009	Avenger
12	Zeryl Lim	22	Manama, Bahrain	December 20, 2009	Avenger
13	Rye Burgos	20	Los Angeles, United States	December 13, 2009	Avenger
14	Fianca Cruz	18	Pasig	December 6, 2009	Avenger
15	Khalid Al-Alawi	17	Manama, Bahrain	November 29, 2009	Top 20 + Top 8 International
16	Marco Bautista	17	Los Angeles, United States	November 29, 2009	Top 20 + Top 8 International
17	Astrid Benitez	21	Marikina	November 29, 2009	Top 20 + Top 8 International
18	Edward Beñosa	19	Quezon City	November 29, 2009	Top 20 + Top 8 International
19	Rollo Espinos	17	Bacolod	November 29, 2009	Top 20 + Top 8 International
20	Goldamier Gamir	19	Malabon	November 29, 2009	Top 20 + Top 8 International
21	Vanessa Harrison	16	Canada	November 29, 2009	Top 20 + Top 8 International
22	Adam Hussein	22	Pasig	November 29, 2009	Top 20 + Top 8 International
23	Naomi King	16	Singapore	November 29, 2009	Top 20 + Top 8 International
24	Michelle Liggayu	18	Pasay	November 29, 2009	Top 20 + Top 8 International
25	Janelle Olafson	19	Quezon City	November 29, 2009	Top 20 + Top 8 International
26	Jeramie Padolina	23	Quezon City	November 29, 2009	Top 20 + Top 8 International
27	Shane Parminter	16	Metro Manila	November 29, 2009	Top 20 + Top 8 International
28	Niko Umali	17	Tokyo, Japan	November 29, 2009	Top 20 + Top 8 International
29	Legendaire Baluyot	18	Bulacan	November 25, 2009	Top 30
30	Krizia Banogon	16	Caloocan	November 25, 2009	Top 30
31	Shereef Ibrahim	19	Quezon City	November 25, 2009	Top 30
32	Norilyn Laksamana	16	Laguna	November 25, 2009	Top 30
33	Xandra Mariano	19	Laguna	November 25, 2009	Top 30
34	Juan Marlowe	16	Muntinlupa	November 25, 2009	Top 30
35	Micheal Navarro	17	Quezon City	November 25, 2009	Top 30
36	Kenyn Padalla	22	Baguio	November 25, 2009	Top 30
37	Zarib Papageorghiou	18	Marikina	November 25, 2009	Top 30
38	Risha Sotto	18	Metro Manila	November 25, 2009	Top 30
39	Nathalie Alvia	19	San Juan	November 22, 2009	Top 60
40	Jeffrey Balicad	20	Valenzuela	November 22, 2009	Top 60
41	Loren Burgos	21	Las Piñas	November 22, 2009	Top 60
42	Lyn Calawod	20	Quezon City	November 22, 2009	Top 60
43	Lilianne Clapis	18	Davao City	November 22, 2009	Top 60
44	Daniel Cuevas	20	Antipolo, Rizal	November 22, 2009	Top 60
45	Mark De Jesus	18	Pampanga	November 22, 2009	Top 60
46	Kaye Dinauto	19	Cebu City	November 22, 2009	Top 60
47	Jerica Davic	19	Quezon City	November 22, 2009	Top 60
48	Richard Faulkerson	17	Santa Rosa, Laguna	November 22, 2009	Top 60
49	Nestle Garcia	18	Parañaque	November 22, 2009	Top 60
50	Christian Gatus	16	Las Piñas	November 22, 2009	Top 60
51	Christopher Gatus	16	Las Piñas	November 22, 2009	Top 60
52	Alexandra Hone	17	General Santos	November 22, 2009	Top 60
53	Luis Hontiveros	17	Marikina	November 22, 2009	Top 60
54	April Jamin	19	Cebu City	November 22, 2009	Top 60
55	Nanah Katayama	18	Las Piñas	November 22, 2009	Top 60
56	Katrina Martinez	16	Bulacan	November 22, 2009	Top 60
57	Christine Martir	16	Bacolod	November 22, 2009	Top 60
58	Tristan Melliza	16	Iloilo City	November 22, 2009	Top 60
59	Jayne Nieva	17	Cavite	November 22, 2009	Top 60
60	Jetrix Pasamanero	21	Saranggani	November 22, 2009	Top 60
61	Ranty Portento	22	Quezon Province	November 22, 2009	Top 60
62	Daniel Reyes	18	Metro Manila	November 22, 2009	Top 60
63	Ladylyn Riva	21	Marikina	November 22, 2009	Top 60
64	Katrina Rothwell	20	Mandaluyong	November 22, 2009	Top 60
65	Jacob Sales	19	Bacolod	November 22, 2009	Top 60
66	Darylle Salvador	17	Baliuag, Bulacan	November 22, 2009	Top 60
67	Aldous Santiago	19	Bulacan	November 22, 2009	Top 60
68	Angelia Ong	19	Iloilo City	November 22, 2009	Top 60

== Profiles ==
- Steven Silva was born in Oceanside, California. He auditioned in Davao City and is the oldest male contestant.
- Sarah Lahbati is the youngest contestant in this year's competition, Who is 16, who hails from Switzerland, who has left everything behind to try her luck in StarStruck.
- Enzo Pineda auditioned in Makati. His father is Manny Pacquiao's agent.
- Rocco Nacino is Baguio-born as Enrico Raphael Nacino, but considers himself a Laguna-native who wants to fulfill his dreams of becoming an actor.
- Diva Montelaba was born as Hyacienth Diva Montelaba. She can sing and dance at the same time. The total performer of this season. Most notable fans of Diva call themselves Divaholics
- Nina Kodaka is dubbed as the crowd favourite. She is the contender from Japan who has always known that she wanted to be an actress.
- Ian Batherson is a German-born finalist who auditioned in the Philippines.
- Rox Montealegre is taking a break in her final year in Ateneo de Manila. She excels in acting based on the record by the mentors.
- Piero Vergara is, at 16 during the show, the youngest male contestant in the competition this year. He labels himself as a "happy-go-lucky guy".
- Princess Snell was born as Princess Tinkerbell Cristina Marjorie Pedere Snell, whose showbiz-oriented dreams are rooted in the desire to give her family a good future She recently posed for the FHM Website in 2008, as the Ran Girl of May for the Maxim Philippines' 2009 calendar and was a member of ABS-CBN's Star Magic talent management agency.
- Sef Cadayona was born as John Paul Joseph Cadayona. He considers dancing his primary talent.
- Zeryl Lim is the eldest female contestant in this year's competition. She auditioned in Bahrain as part of StarStruck V's Worldwide auditions.
- Rye Burgos is one of StarStruck V's Worldwide auditions finalist. His biggest strength, according to him, is his acting skills. “I try my best to give my natural feelings, rather than copy them from someone else.”
- Fianca Cruz says dancing is her passion, and it's where she is able to show who she really is.

== Weekly Artista Tests ==
Color key:

Contestant with the Challenge Winner
Contestant was saved by the Public Vote and Council Vote
Contestant was in the Top 30 and Top 20
Contestant was from the +Top 8 International Aspirants
Contestant was in the Final 14 and Final V
Contestant was in the Bottom Group
Contestant was saved by the Council
Contestant was Eliminated
Contestant was the Runner-up
Contestant was the Winner

Every week, the survivors undergo several artista tests, handled by the 5 mentors.

Week 1: Featured the Top 100 up to the Top 60 hopefuls, was reduced to Top 20 hopefuls, plus the Top 8 international aspirants started on week 2.

  - Challenge Winner Contestant: Not Awarded
  - Factor I: Automatic Eliminated Contestant: None
  - Factor II: Saved Contestant: None
  - Factor IV: Bottom Group Contestant: None
  - Factor V: Non-Elimination Contestant: None
  - Top 60 Hopefuls

Contestant	Result
Adam Hussein	Top 30
Aldous Santiago	Eliminated
Christian Gatus	Eliminated
Christopher Gatus	Eliminated
Daniel Cuevas	Eliminated
Daniel Reyes	Eliminated
Darylle Salvador	Eliminated
Edward Beñosa	Top 30
Enzo Pineda	Top 30
Ian Batherson	Top 30
Jacob Sales	Eliminated
Jeffrey Balicad	Eliminated
Jetrix Pasamanero	Eliminated
Juan Marlowe	Top 30
Kenyn Padalla	Top 30
Luis Hontiveros	Eliminated
Mark De Jesus	Eliminated
Micheal Navarro	Top 30
Piero Vergara	Top 30
Ranty Portento	Eliminated
Richard Faulkerson	Eliminated
Rocco Nacino	Top 30
Rollo Espinos	Top 30
Sef Cadayona	Top 30
Shane Parminter	Top 30
Shereef Ibrahim	Top 30
Steven Silva	Top 30
Tristan Melliza	Eliminated
Zarib Papageorghiou	Top 30

Contestant	Result
Alexandra Hone	Eliminated
Angelia Ong	Eliminated
April Jamin	Eliminated
Astrid Benitez	Top 30
Christine Martir	Eliminated
Diva Montelaba	Top 30
Fianca Cruz	Top 30
Goldamier Gamir	Top 30
Janelle Olafson	Top 30
Jayne Nieva	Eliminated
Jeramie Padolina	Top 30
Jerica Davic	Eliminated
Katrina Martinez	Eliminated
Katrina Rothwell	Eliminated
Kaye Dinauto	Eliminated
Krizia Banogon	Top 30
Ladylyn Riva	Eliminated
Legendaire Baluyot	Top 30
Lilianne Clapis	Eliminated
Loren Burgos	Eliminated
Lyn Calawod	Eliminated
Michelle Liggayu	Top 30
Nanah Katayama	Eliminated
Nathalie Alvia	Eliminated
Nestle Garcia	Eliminated
Norilyn Laksamana	Top 30
Princess Snell	Top 30
Risha Sotto	Top 30
Rox Montealegre	Top 30
Sarah Lahbati	Top 30
Xandra Mariano	Top 30

  - Top 30 Hopefuls

Contestant	Result
Adam Hussein	Top 20
Edward Beñosa	Top 20
Enzo Pineda	Top 20
Ian Batherson	Top 20
Juan Marlowe	Eliminated
Kenyn Padalla	Eliminated
Micheal Navarro	Eliminated
Piero Vergara	Top 20
Rocco Nacino	Top 20
Rollo Espinos	Top 20
Sef Cadayona	Top 20
Shane Parminter	Top 20
Shereef Ibrahim	Eliminated
Steven Silva	Top 20
Zarib Papageorghiou	Eliminated

Contestant	Result
Astrid Benitez	Top 20
Diva Montelaba	Top 20
Fianca Cruz	Top 20
Goldamier Gamir	Top 20
Janelle Olafson	Top 20
Jeramie Padolina	Top 20
Krizia Banogon	Eliminated
Legendaire Baluyot	Eliminated
Michelle Liggayu	Top 20
Norilyn Laksamana	Eliminated
Princess Snell	Top 20
Risha Sotto	Eliminated
Rox Montealegre	Top 20
Sarah Lahbati	Top 20
Xandra Mariano	Eliminated

  - +Top 8 International Aspirants

Contestant	Result
Khalid Al-Alawi	+Top 8
Marco Bautista	+Top 8
Niko Umali	+Top 8
Rye Burgos	+Top 8

Contestant	Result
Naomi King	+Top 8
Nina Kodaka	+Top 8
Vanessa Harrison	+Top 8
Zeryl Lim	+Top 8

Week 2: The Top 28 hopefuls was reduced to the Final 14 hopefuls started on week 3.

  - Challenge Winner Contestant: Not Awarded
  - Factor I: Automatic Eliminated Contestant: None
  - Factor II: Saved Contestant: None
  - Factor IV: Bottom Group Contestant: None
  - Factor V: Non-Elimination Contestant: None

Contestant	Result
Adam Hussein	Eliminated
Edward Beñosa	Eliminated
Enzo Pineda	Final 14
Ian Batherson	Final 14
Khalid Al-Alawi	Eliminated
Marco Bautista	Eliminated
Niko Umali	Eliminated
Piero Vergara	Final 14
Rocco Nacino	Final 14
Rollo Espinos	Eliminated
Rye Burgos	Final 14
Sef Cadayona	Final 14
Shane Parminter	Eliminated
Steven Silva	Final 14

Contestant	Result
Astrid Benitez	Eliminated
Diva Montelaba	Final 14
Fianca Cruz	Final 14
Goldamier Gamir	Eliminated
Janelle Olafson	Eliminated
Jeramie Padolina	Eliminated
Michelle Liggayu	Eliminated
Naomi King	Eliminated
Nina Kodaka	Final 14
Princess Snell	Final 14
Rox Montealegre	Final 14
Sarah Lahbati	Final 14
Vanessa Harrison	Eliminated
Zeryl Lim	Final 14

Week 3: First acting test. The girls did a scene from Paano Ba Ang Mangarap? with its lead star and ShoutOut host Mark Herras whereas the boys did a scene from Magdusa Ka with its lead actress Katrina Halili. Later that week, they underwent a total makeover session with Barbi Chan with the help of stylists from Essensuals Toni and Guy 6750 Salon. They ended the week with their first two mall show at SM City Marikina and SM City Taytay respectively.

  - Challenge Winner Contestant: Not Awarded
  - Factor I: Automatic Eliminated Contestant: None
  - Factor II: Saved Contestant: None
  - Factor V: Non-Elimination Contestant: None

Contestant	Result
Enzo Pineda	Safe
Ian Batherson	Bottom 2
Piero Vergara	Safe
Rocco Nacino	Safe
Rye Burgos	Safe
Sef Cadayona	Safe
Steven Silva	Safe

Contestant	Result
Diva Montelaba	Safe
Fianca Cruz	Eliminated
Nina Kodaka	Safe
Princess Snell	Safe
Rox Montealegre	Safe
Sarah Lahbati	Safe
Zeryl Lim	Safe

Week 4: The lucky 13 had voice test with music mentor Jai Sabas-Aracama. It was later followed by the shoot of their first music video under music video directors Treb Monteras II (Rocco Nacino, Nina Kodaka, Piero Vergara, Sef Cadayona and Princess Snell), J. Pacena II (Steven Silva, Sarah Lahbati, Rox Montealegre and Rye Burgos) and Genghis Jimenez (Ian Batherson, Zeryl Lim, Diva Montelaba and Enzo Pineda). They had another mall show, this time in two Cavite malls, SM City Dasmariñas and SM City Rosario. Rocco Nacino and Sarah Lahbati got the best music video award for this artista test.

  - Factor I: Automatic Eliminated Contestant: None
  - Factor II: Saved Contestant: None
  - Factor V: Non-Elimination Contestant: None

Contestant	Result
Enzo Pineda	Safe
Ian Batherson	Bottom 2
Piero Vergara	Safe
Rocco Nacino	Challenge Winner
Rye Burgos	Eliminated
Sef Cadayona	Safe
Steven Silva	Safe

Contestant	Result
Diva Montelaba	Challenge Winner
Nina Kodaka	Bottom 3
Princess Snell	Safe
Rox Montealegre	Safe
Sarah Lahbati	Challenge Winner
Zeryl Lim	Safe

Week 5: The top twelve faced another mentor, this time with the dance expert Douglas Nierras. He chose 2 pairs that would have the spotlight for the Sunday Live Episode. Meanwhile, Sarah Lahbati and Zeryl Lim were not able to complete the dance workshop due to health problems thus giving them demerits. Princess Snell also received demerits for missing a dance rehearsal. Rocco Nacino and Diva Montelaba were announced as the Best Male and Female Performers of the Week and were automatically saved from elimination. Meanwhile, Nina Kodaka received a reward for winning the Facebook challenge.

  - Factor I: Automatic Eliminated Contestant: None
  - Factor II: Saved Contestant: None
  - Factor V: Non-Elimination Contestant: None

Contestant	Result
Enzo Pineda	Safe
Ian Batherson	Safe
Piero Vergara	Safe
Rocco Nacino	Challenge Winner
Sef Cadayona	Bottom 3
Steven Silva	Safe

Contestant	Result
Diva Montelaba	Challenge Winner
Nina Kodaka	Safe
Princess Snell	Bottom 2
Rox Montealegre	Safe
Sarah Lahbati	Safe
Zeryl Lim	Eliminated

Week 6: The remaining survivors, led by Nina, held a Christmas Party for some children of a chosen charity. They shopped for food, gifts and other things at SM City North EDSA. The survivors also had their first kiss flick (first introduced in The Next Level). Steven was paired with Nina Kodaka, Rocco Nacino with Princess, Sef Cadayona with Rox Montealegre, Piero Vergara with Diva Montelaba, while Sarah Lahbati, after being chosen by Gina Alajar as the best actress in their first acting test, was paired with both Ian Batherson and Enzo Pineda. Gina chose the pairs of Rocco Nacino & Princess Snell and Piero Vergara & Diva Montelaba as the best two pairs. The two boys will have a scene with Kris Bernal while the two girls with Aljur Abrenica. In the results night, the pairing of Rocco Nacino and Princess Snell won the popularity vote of the studio audience for "Best Kiss", while Rocco Nacino and Diva Montelaba, again, and won Best Male and Female Performers respectively, thus, saving them again from elimination.

  - Factor I: Automatic Eliminated: None
  - Factor II: Saved Contestant: None
  - Factor V: Non-Elimination Contestant: None

Contestant	Result
Enzo Pineda	Safe
Ian Batherson	Safe
Piero Vergara	Safe
Rocco Nacino	Challenge Winner
Sef Cadayona	Eliminated
Steven Silva	Safe

Contestant	Result
Diva Montelaba	Safe
Nina Kodaka	Safe
Princess Snell	Bottom 3
Rox Montealegre	Bottom 2
Sarah Lahbati	Safe

Week 7: The remaining survivors had a photo shoot test under guest mentor Jun de Leon. They also had to learn the steps for the dance craze of this season, "Enjoy". The scores for this week will be carried over on Week 7 since Week 6 will use "Factor 3".

  - Challenge Winner Contestant: Not Awarded
  - Factor I: Automatic Eliminated Contestant: None
  - Factor II: Saved Contestant: None
  - Factor III: Elimination Contestant: None
  - Factor IV: Bottom Group Contestant: None

Contestant	Result
Enzo Pineda	Safe
Ian Batherson	Safe
Piero Vergara	Safe
Rocco Nacino	Safe
Steven Silva	Safe

Contestant	Result
Diva Montelaba	Safe
Nina Kodaka	Safe
Princess Snell	Safe
Rox Montealegre	Safe
Sarah Lahbati	Safe

Week 8: The survivor 10 had surprise artista tests this week. First was an acting test with Glaiza de Castro, directed by the 2009 Cannes Film Festival Best Director Brilliante Mendoza. For their singing test, they had a duet with Kyla. They also had a hosting test, with Lucy Torres-Gomez and Wilma Doesnt as their guests. The week ended with a live telecast of their first mall show for 2010 at SM City North EDSA.

  - Challenge Winner Contestant: Not Awarded
  - Factor I: Automatic Eliminated Contestant: None*
  - Factor II: Saved Contestant: None
  - Factor V: Non-Elimination Contestant: None

Contestant	Result
Enzo Pineda	Bottom 4
Ian Batherson	Safe
Piero Vergara	Eliminated
Rocco Nacino	Safe
Steven Silva	Safe

Contestant	Result
Diva Montelaba	Bottom 4
Nina Kodaka	Safe
Princess Snell	Eliminated
Rox Montealegre	Safe
Sarah Lahbati	Safe

Week 9: In preparation for a bigger acting test, the remaining survivors had an acting workshop with acting mentor Gina Alajar. For the first time, the eight remaining survivors would act altogether in one scene (entitled "Monsters") with Eula Valdez. It was directed by Maryo J. de los Reyes and the script was written by council member Floy Quintos. Also, they had another interrogation test with the Starstruck Council. They ended the week with a mall show at SM Supercenter SM City Valenzuela.

  - Challenge Winner Contestant: Not Awarded
  - Factor I: Automatic Eliminated Contestant: None
  - Factor III: Elimination Contestant: None

Contestant	Result
Enzo Pineda	Safe
Ian Batherson	Safe
Rocco Nacino	Saved
Steven Silva	Safe

Contestant	Result
Diva Montelaba	Safe
Nina Kodaka	Bottom 3
Rox Montealegre	Safe
Sarah Lahbati	Saved

Week 10: For the first time, the survivors did a music flick entitled "Team Song". In preparation for this, they had voice lessons with singing mentor ai Sabas-Aracama. They also recorded the songs they used for the musical; wherein they were joined by season one's first princess Yasmien Kurdi and season four avenger and Shoutout host Paulo Avelino. They ended the week with a mall show at SM City Fairview.

  - Challenge Winner Contestant: Not Awarded
  - Factor I: Automatic Eliminated Contestant: None
  - Factor II: Saved Contestant: None
  - Factor V: Non-Elimination Contestant: None

Contestant	Result
Enzo Pineda	Bottom 3
Ian Batherson	Safe
Rocco Nacino	Safe
Steven Silva	Bottom 2

Contestant	Result
Diva Montelaba	Safe
Nina Kodaka	Safe
Rox Montealegre	Eliminated
Sarah Lahbati	Safe

Week 11: The remaining survivors began to live under one roof starting this week, on a place called StarStruck 1110. Each week, one Survivor would act as the "House Master", this week being Steven Silva. For their acting test, they performed their "dream roles", in a test called the Dream Flicks, directed by Soxie Topacio, the director of Philippines' Oscar Entry for 2010, Ded na si Lolo. In addition to this, the Survivors acted with TV personalities who have celebrity/famous relatives. They ended the week with a mall show at SM City Manila.

  - Challenge Winner Contestant: Not Awarded
  - Factor II: Saved Contestant: None
  - Factor V: Non-Elimination Contestant: None

Contestant	Result
Enzo Pineda	Bottom 3
Ian Batherson	Eliminated
Rocco Nacino	Safe
Steven Silva	Bottom 2

Contestant	Result
Diva Montelaba	Safe
Nina Kodaka	Safe
Sarah Lahbati	Safe

Week 12: The survivors did a fashion show for Guess at Trinoma. Also, the remaining survivors did cameo appearances at GMA shows including The Last Prince (Steven Silva and Rocco Nacino), Ina, Kasusuklaman Ba Kita? (Nina Kodaka and Diva Montelaba) and Gumapang Ka Sa Lusak (Sarah Lahbati and Enzo Pineda). They also did a hosting stint for Startalk, joining the segments Da Who, Chika Picka and Up Next. They also faced their mentors and ended the week with a mall show at SM City San Lazaro.

  - Challenge Winner Contestant: Not Awarded
  - Factor I: Automatic Eliminated Contestant: None
  - Factor II: Saved Contestant: None
  - Factor III: Elimination Contestant: None
  - Factor IV: Bottom Group Contestant: None

Contestant	Result
Enzo Pineda	Safe
Rocco Nacino	Safe
Steven Silva	Safe

Contestant	Result
Diva Montelaba	Safe
Nina Kodaka	Safe
Sarah Lahbati	Safe

Week 13: The remaining six survivors did a photoshoot for Mega Publishing Corporation's magazine, S Magazine. The pictorial appeared on the February 2010 issue of the magazine. They also faced the avenger on a special Valentine's Day date that turned out to be "Vengeance Day". Each avenger gave a black rose to a survivor they think does not deserve to earn a spot in the final five. They ended the week with a mall show at SM City Bicutan.

Contestant	Result
Enzo Pineda	Final V
Rocco Nacino	Final V
Steven Silva	Final V

Contestant	Result
Diva Montelaba	Final V
Nina Kodaka	Eliminated
Sarah Lahbati	Final V

Week 14: The Final V had a chance to go back to their hometown to thank their supporters. They also guested in select GMA and QTV shows to promote the upcoming Final Judgment, such as in Unang Hirit and in Tweetbiz (for their miting de avance). They also had a motorcade at the Araneta Center and had a mini mall show at the new Ali Mall wherein they handed down some tickets to their fans for the Final Judgment.

Contestant	Result
Enzo Pineda	First Prince
Rocco Nacino	Second Prince
Steven Silva	Ultimate Male Survivor

Contestant	Result
Diva Montelaba	First Princess
Sarah Lahbati	Ultimate Female Survivor

== Final Judgment ==
The winner was announced on a two-hour TV special dubbed as StarStruck V: The Final Judgment was held live on February 21, 2010 at the Araneta Coliseum.

Hosted by Raymond Gutierrez, Carla Abellana and Dennis Trillo with guest co-hosts from the first season, Dingdong Dantes and Nancy Castiglione. The council are Lolit Solis, Floy Quintos and Iza Calzado.

The opening dance number was attended by numerous graduates, both the ultimate winners and avengers and they were joined by this season's final five. The avengers’ performance came in next, in a song and dance medley detailing the journey of the survivors from the audition process, until the introduction of the fifty-ninth graduates, the eight International contenders and the elimination of the avengers.

Joining them in their song and dance medley are their five mentors are from Gina Alajar, Douglas Nierras, Jai Sabas-Aracama, Barbi Chan and Abbygale Arrenas de Leon. And the special guest, Marian Rivera's Sabay-Sabay Tayo dance, and then joined join the nine avengers for a dance number.

The final five then performs by own numbers. Enzo Pineda came in first with his sing and dance performance to the medley of Jay Sean's Down and Do You Remember, Diva Montelaba performed to Lady Gaga's Bad Romance and Alexandra Burke's Bad Boys, Steven Silva came in next with another sing and dance medley to Iyaz's Replay and David Guetta's Sexy Chick, Sarah Lahbati is the only one who sang live to Jordin Sparks's This Is My Now and Miley Cyrus's The Climb, The last performer Rocco Nacino also did a sing and dance medley to Kris Allen's Live Like We're Dying and Adam Lambert's For Your Entertainment.

After the performance of the final five, they were joined onstage by graduates the ultimate winners with Mark Herras, Jennylyn Mercado, Mike Tan, Ryza Cenon, Aljur Abrenica, Jewel Mische, Mart Escudero and Kris Bernal. Only Jackie Rice was not able to attend, while Marky Cielo had already died.

The avengers once again took the stage, performing to a medley of the previous elimination night songs. Each also received a special award: Still Standing Strong Award for Nina Kodaka, Staying Alive Award for Ian Batherson, Breakthrough Dance Award for Rox Montealegre, Future Hitmaker Award for Piero Vergara, Warrior Princess Award for Princess Snell, May Ibubuga Pa Award for Sef Cadayona, Vavavoom Award for Zeryl Lim, Fighting Spirit Award for Rye Burgos, and Reyna ng Runway Award for Fianca Cruz. The StarStruck Avengers (the losing contestants) also received an exclusive contract from the network. Right before the announcement of winners, the final five were shown with a taped message to their fans while R&B singers Kyla and Jay-R sang a duet of the song of Kelly Clarkson's Breakaway.

Announcement come, Sarah Lahbati of Geneva, Switzerland and who represented of Dasmariñas, Cavite is the Ultimate Female Survivor with a score of 94.6% and Steven Silva of Oceanside, California and who represented of Davao City is the Ultimate Male Survivor with a score of 93.5% were proclaimed as the Ultimate Survivors, each of them received P1,500,000 pesos each plus and an exclusive management contract from GMA Network with a minimum guarantee of P3, 500,000 pesos, summing up to a total prize of at least P5,000,000 pesos.

While, Diva Montelaba of Cebu City is the First Princess with a score of 91.5%, Rocco Nacino of Pasig is being declared as the first ever the Second Prince with a score of 88.3% and Enzo Pineda of Quezon City is the First Prince with a score of 90.2% were proclaimed as the Runners-up, each of them received P200,000 pesos each plus and an exclusive management contract from the network.

== TV Assignment ==
For their first TV Assignment, the final five Steven Silva, Sarah Lahbati, Enzo Pineda and Diva Montelaba except Rocco Nacino headlined one of the chapters of romantic comedy, Love Bug Presents: Exchange Of Hearts.

== Signature dances ==
There are signature dances and songs made in each batch. With this batch, their signature dances and songs are:

- Enjoy
- Starstruck
- Sabay-Sabay Tayo

== Elimination chart ==
Color key:

Male contestant
Female contestant
International contestant
Semi-finalist
Final 14 and Final V
Challenge Winner
Safe
Bottom Group
Eliminated
Finalist
Runner-up
Winner

Results per public and council votes
Place	Contestant	Top 60 (Week 1)	Top 30 +Top 8 (Week 1)	Top 28 (Week 2)	Top 14 (Week 3)	Top 13 (Week 4)	Top 12 (Week 5)	Top 11 (Week 6)	Top 10 (Week 7-8)		Top 8 (Week 9-10)		Top 7 (Week 11)	Top 6 (Week 12-13)		Top V (Week 14)
Place	Contestant	11/22/09 ^{1}	11/25/09 ^{2}	11/29/09 ^{3}	12/6/09	12/13/09	12/20/09	12/27/09	1/3/10 ^{4}	1/10/10 ^{5}	1/17/10 ^{6}	1/24/10	1/31/10 ^{7}	2/7/10 ^{8}	2/14/10 ^{9}	2/21/10 ^{10}
1–5	Steven Silva	Top 30	Top 20	Final 14	Safe	Safe	Safe	Safe	Safe	Safe	Safe	Bottom 2	Bottom 2	Safe	Final V	Ultimate Male Survivor
1–5	Sarah Lahbati	Top 30	Top 20	Final 14	Safe	Challenge Winner	Safe	Safe	Safe	Safe	Bottom 2	Safe	Safe	Safe	Final V	Ultimate Female Survivor
1–5	Enzo Pineda	Top 30	Top 20	Final 14	Safe	Safe	Safe	Safe	Safe	Bottom 4	Safe	Bottom 3	Safe	Safe	Final V	First Prince
1–5	Rocco Nacino	Top 30	Top 20	Final 14	Safe	Challenge Winner	Challenge Winner	Challenge Winner	Safe	Safe	Bottom 2	Safe	Bottom 2	Safe	Final V	Second Prince
1–5	Diva Montelaba	Top 30	Top 20	Final 14	Safe	Challenge Winner	Challenge Winner	Safe	Safe	Bottom 4	Safe	Safe	Safe	Safe	Final V	First Princess
6	Nina Kodaka		+Top 8 International	Final 14	Safe	Bottom 3	Safe	Safe	Safe	Safe	Bottom 3	Safe	Safe	Safe	Eliminated	Avenger
7	Ian Batherson	Top 30	Top 20	Final 14	Bottom 2	Bottom 2	Safe	Safe	Safe	Safe	Safe	Safe	Eliminated			Avenger
8	Rox Montealegre	Top 30	Top 20	Final 14	Safe	Safe	Safe	Bottom 2	Safe	Safe	Safe	Eliminated				Avenger
9–10	Piero Vergara	Top 30	Top 20	Final 14	Safe	Safe	Safe	Safe	Safe	Eliminated						Avenger
9–10	Princess Snell	Top 30	Top 20	Final 14	Safe	Safe	Bottom 2	Bottom 3	Safe	Eliminated						Avenger
11	Sef Cadayona	Top 30	Top 20	Final 14	Safe	Safe	Bottom 3	Eliminated								Avenger
12	Zeryl Lim		+Top 8 International	Final 14	Safe	Safe	Eliminated									Avenger
13	Rye Burgos		+Top 8 International	Final 14	Safe	Eliminated										Avenger
14	Fianca Cruz	Top 30	Top 20	Final 14	Eliminated											Avenger
15–28	Khalid Al-Alawi		+Top 8 International	Eliminated												Top 20 +Top 8 International
15–28	Marco Bautista		+Top 8 International	Eliminated												Top 20 +Top 8 International
15–28	Astrid Benitez	Top 30	Top 20	Eliminated												Top 20 +Top 8 International
15–28	Edward Beñosa	Top 30	Top 20	Eliminated												Top 20 +Top 8 International
15–28	Rollo Espinos	Top 30	Top 20	Eliminated												Top 20 +Top 8 International
15–28	Goldamier Gamir	Top 30	Top 20	Eliminated												Top 20 +Top 8 International
15–28	Vanessa Harrison		+Top 8 International	Eliminated												Top 20 +Top 8 International
15–28	Adam Hussein	Top 30	Top 20	Eliminated												Top 20 +Top 8 International
15–28	Naomi King		+Top 8 International	Eliminated												Top 20 +Top 8 International
15–28	Michelle Liggayu	Top 30	Top 20	Eliminated												Top 20 +Top 8 International
15–28	Janel Olafson	Top 30	Top 20	Eliminated												Top 20 +Top 8 International
15–28	Jeramie Padolina	Top 30	Top 20	Eliminated												Top 20 +Top 8 International
15–28	Shane Parminter	Top 30	Top 20	Eliminated												Top 20 +Top 8 International
15–28	Niko Umali		+Top 8 International	Eliminated												Top 20 +Top 8 International
29–38	Legendaire Baluyot	Top 30	Eliminated													Top 30
29–38	Krizia Banogon	Top 30	Eliminated													Top 30
29–38	Shereef Ibrahim	Top 30	Eliminated													Top 30
29–38	Norilyn Laksamana	Top 30	Eliminated													Top 30
29–38	Xandra Mariano	Top 30	Eliminated													Top 30
29–38	Juan Marlowe	Top 30	Eliminated													Top 30
29–38	Micheal Navarro	Top 30	Eliminated													Top 30
29–38	Kenyn Padalla	Top 30	Eliminated													Top 30
29–38	Zarib Papageorghiou	Top 30	Eliminated													Top 30
29–38	Risha Sotto	Top 30	Eliminated													Top 30
39–68	Nathalie Alvia	Eliminated														Top 60
39–68	Jeffrey Balicad	Eliminated														Top 60
39–68	Loren Burgos	Eliminated														Top 60
39–68	Lyn Calawod	Eliminated														Top 60
39–68	Lilianne Clapis	Eliminated														Top 60
39–68	Daniel Cuevas	Eliminated														Top 60
39–68	Mark De Jesus	Eliminated														Top 60
39–68	Kay Dinauto	Eliminated														Top 60
39–68	Jerica Davic	Eliminated														Top 60
39–68	Richard Faulkerson	Eliminated														Top 60
39–68	Nestle Garcia	Eliminated														Top 60
39–68	Christian Gatus	Eliminated														Top 60
39–68	Christopher Gatus	Eliminated														Top 60
39–68	Alexandra Hone	Eliminated														Top 60
39–68	Luis Hontiveros	Eliminated														Top 60
39–68	April Jamin	Eliminated														Top 60
39–68	Nanah Katayama	Eliminated														Top 60
39–68	Katrina Martinez	Eliminated														Top 60
39–68	Christine Martir	Eliminated														Top 60
39–68	Tristan Melliza	Eliminated														Top 60
39–68	Jayne Nieva	Eliminated														Top 60
39–68	Jetrix Pasamanero	Eliminated														Top 60
39–68	Ranty Portento	Eliminated														Top 60
39–68	Daniel Reyes	Eliminated														Top 60
39–68	Ladylyn Riva	Eliminated														Top 60
39–68	Katrina Rothwell	Eliminated														Top 60
39–68	Jacob Sales	Eliminated														Top 60
39–68	Darylle Salvador	Eliminated														Top 60
39–68	Aldous Santiago	Eliminated														Top 60
39–68	Angelia Ong	Eliminated														Top 60

=== Notes ===
1. In this season, finally revealed of the Top 60 hopefuls where name on the show's premier last Sunday, November 15, 2009. The half of hopefuls will be eliminated the next Sunday, November 22, 2009.
2. The remaining Top 30 hopefuls were reduced to the Top 20 hopefuls on November 25, 2009. While the remaining twenty hopefuls, they are advanced to the next round of the competition, plus the surprise additional of the eight international aspirants.
3. The Top 28 hopefuls were reduced, the final fourteen was chosen on November 29, 2009.
4. It was a non-elimination week on January 3, 2010 because Factor 3 was introduced. As a result, two of the survivors were eliminated from the competition on January 10, 2010.
5. No bottom group was announced. Diva Montelaba together with Princess Snell and Enzo Pineda together with Piero Vergara were called for the elimination process. The first called to eliminated is Princess Snell and the second called is Piero Vergara
6. No eliminated this week because the council used their special power, Factor 2. The bottom group was Nina Kodaka, Rocco Nacino and Sarah Lahbati was safe for the elimination on January 17, 2010.
7. Ian Batherson was automatic eliminated because of Factor 1. The bottom group are Rocco Nacino and Steven Silva was safe for the elimination, because only Ian Batherson got the lower scores from the council and viewers.
8. This week is a pre-determined non-elimination week due to the introduction of Factor 5. Furthermore, no bottom group was announced.
9. The final five was chosen on February 14, 2010. And the last avenger is Nina Kodaka.
10. In the final judgment night, Steven Silva and Sarah Lahbati were proclaimed as the Ultimate Survivors.
