= Erwan Heussaff =

Filipino-French food content creator and media producer

Erwan Heussaff is a Filipino-French food content creator, entrepreneur, and media producer. He is associated with The Fat Kid Inside Studios and FEATR, a digital media brand focused on food, travel, and culture in the Philippines.

In 2023, Heussaff won the James Beard Media Award for Social Media Accounts.

== Career ==
Heussaff became known for food and lifestyle content under The Fat Kid Inside, which later developed into a digital media and production company. Tatler Asia describes The Fat Kid Inside Studios as the production studio that creates videos for FEATR and produces content with brands and media organisations.

In 2021, Heussaff rebranded his online food channels under FEATR. FEATR produces videos and documentaries about food, travel, and Filipino culture. Its work has included content on regional food traditions and local ingredients in the Philippines. In 2025, Rolling Stone Philippines described Heussaff's work as focused on Filipino foodways and regional food stories.

Heussaff has also appeared in Netflix-related food and culture programming. In 2025, he was featured in the Manila episode of the Netflix travel and food series Somebody Feed Phil. He was also featured in an episode of The Stir, a Netflix Philippines digital series.

Tatler Asia included him in its Asia's Most Influential list for the Philippines in 2023.

== Personal life ==
Heussaff was born to Cynthia Adea, a Filipina, and Louis Paul Heussaff, a former sailor in the French Navy from Douarnenez, in Brittany, He is the brother of actress and model Solenn Heussaff.

Heussaff is married to actress and television host Anne Curtis. They married in New Zealand in 2017. Their child, Dahlia Amélie, was born on 2 March 2020, in Australia. The name "Dahlia" is said to be taken from the name of Curtis' character in her 1997 debut film, Magic Kingdom: Ang Alamat ng Damortis.
