= Seduction (2013 film) =

- Official movie poster
- Directed by: Peque Gallaga
- Written by: Aloy Adlawan
- Produced by: Lily Y. Monteverde; Roselle Y. Monteverde
- Starring: Richard Gutierrez; Solenn Heussaff; Sarah Lahbati
- Cinematography: Mark Gary
- Edited by: Paolo Lindaya
- Music by: Emerzon Texon
- Production company: Regal Films
- Distributed by: GMA Network
- Release date: January 30, 2013
- Running time: 115 minutes
- Country: Philippines
- Languages: Filipino; English
- Box office: ₱6,588,924.00

Seduction is a 2013 Filipino erotic thriller drama film directed by Peque Gallaga and starring GMA Network's exclusive actors Richard Gutierrez, Solenn Heussaff, and Sarah Lahbati. The film was produced by Regal Films and was released on January 30, 2013.

== Cast ==
- Richard Gutierrez as Ram
- Solenn Heussaff as Sophia
- Sarah Lahbati as Trina
- Mark Gil as Fidel
- Jay Manalo as Ervin
- Yayo Aguila as Dolor
- Vangie Labalan as Viring
- Al Tantay as Lucas
- Shyr Valdez as Yolanda
- Jon Orlando as Marcel
- Rodjun Cruz

== Reception ==
Although reviews were mostly positive, the film was a Philippine box office bomb.
