= Innamorata (TV series) =

2014 Philippine television drama series

- Title card
- Genre: Drama; Romantic fantasy
- Created by: R.J. Nuevas
- Written by: R.J. Nuevas; Lobert Villela; Danzen Santos; Ma. Zita Garganera
- Directed by: Don Michael Perez
- Creative director: Jun Lana
- Starring: Max Collins
- Theme music composer: Leocadio Sanchez III
- Opening theme: "Tanging Ika'y Mamahalin" by Jonalyn Viray
- Country of origin: Philippines
- Original language: Tagalog
- No. of episodes: 88 (list of episodes)

Production
- Executive producer: Arlene D. Pilapil
- Production locations: Quezon City, Philippines
- Camera setup: Multiple-camera setup
- Running time: 22–25 minutes
- Production company: GMA Entertainment TV

Original release
- Network: GMA Network
- Release: February 17 – June 20, 2014

Innamorata is a 2014 Philippine television drama romance fantasy series broadcast by GMA Network. Directed by Don Michael Perez, it stars Max Collins in the title role. It premiered on February 17, 2014 on the network's Afternoon Prime line up. The series concluded on June 20, 2014, with a total of 88 episodes.

The series is streaming online on YouTube.

== Cast and characters ==
Cast

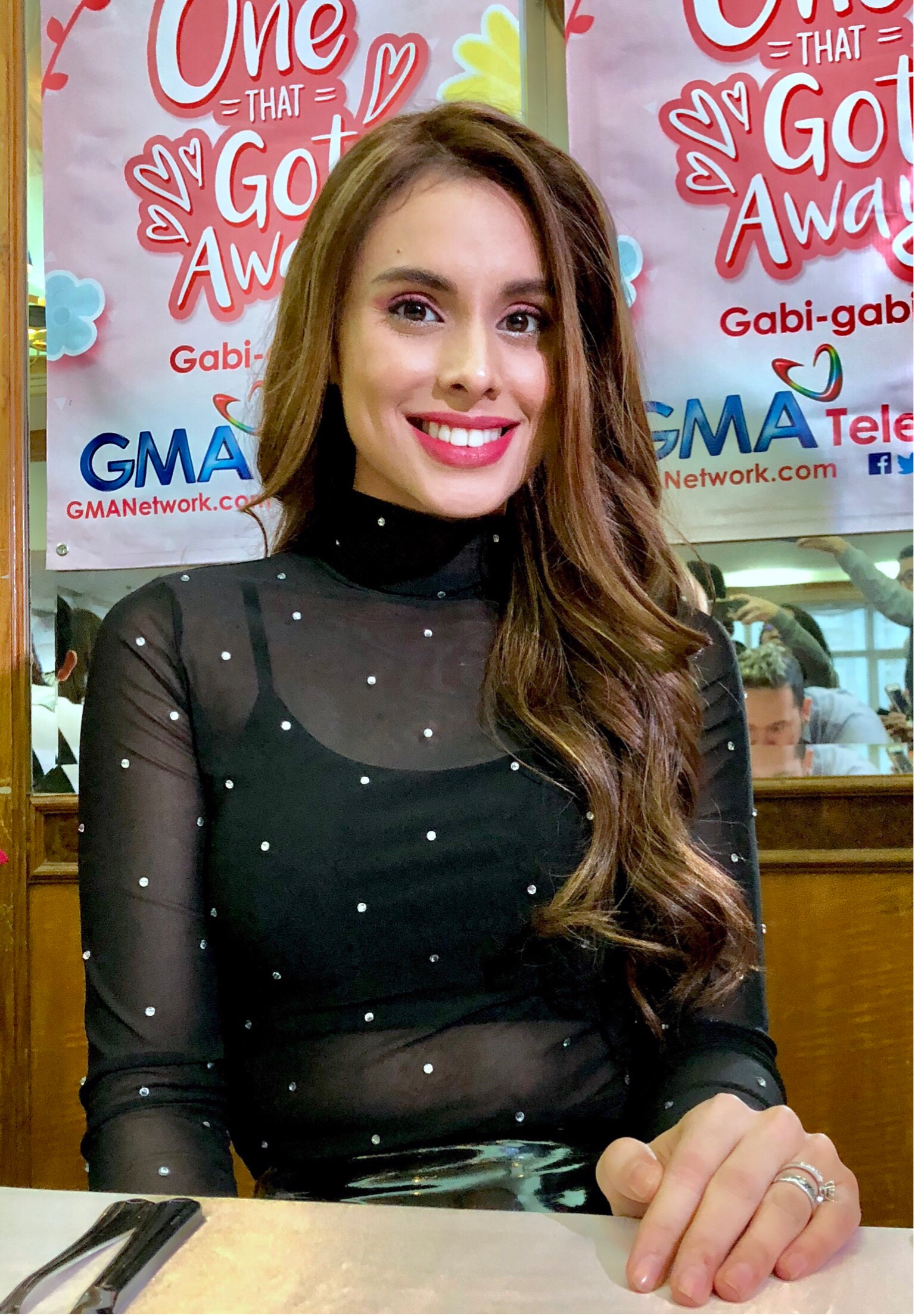
Max Collins

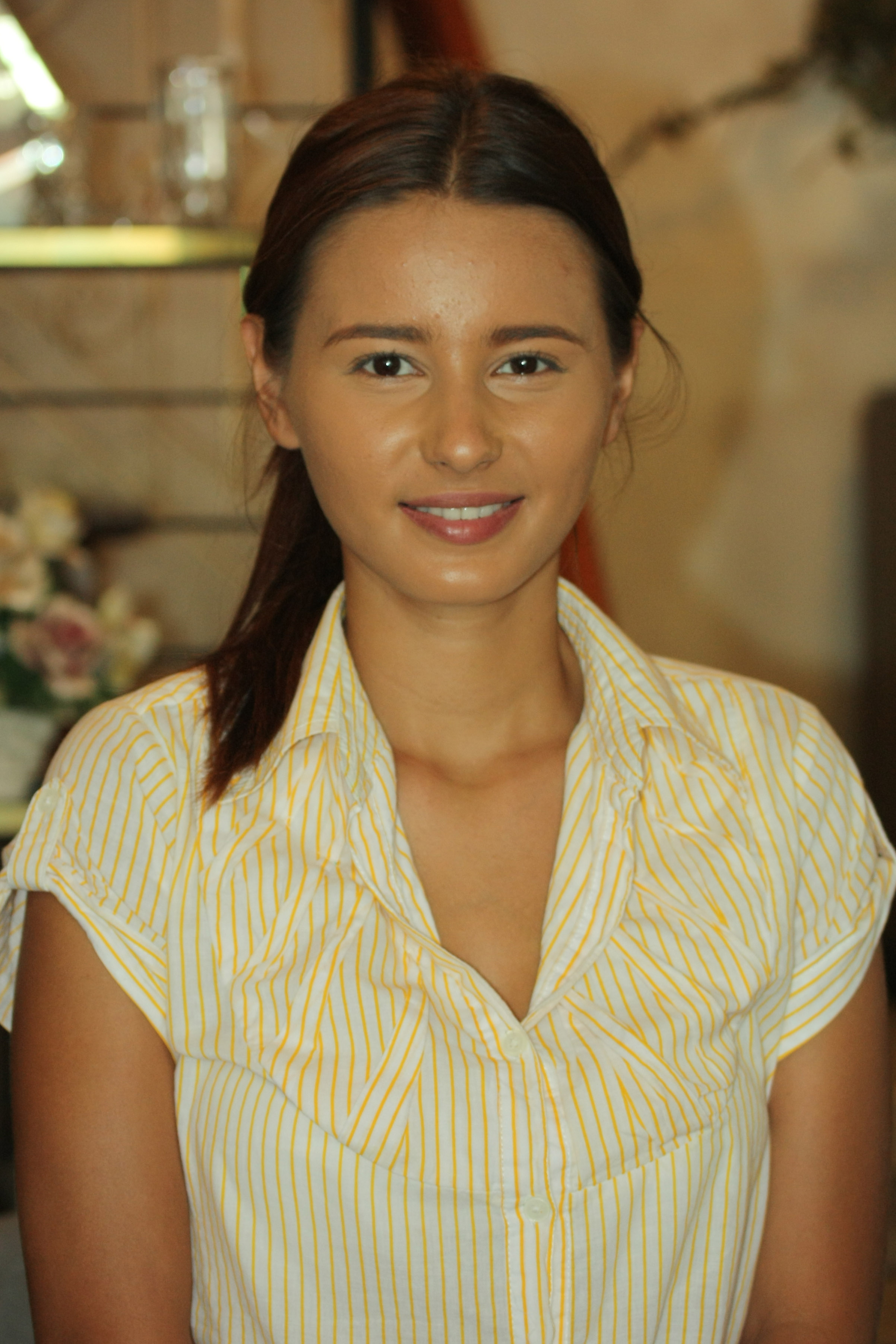
Jackie Rice

Lead cast

- Max Collins as Esperanza "Esper" Cunanan-Manansala / Evangeline Cunanan / Alejandra

Supporting cast

- Luis Alandy as Edwin Manansala / Arnaldo Manansala
- Dion Ignacio as Dencio I. Manansala
- Jackie Rice as Georgina "Gina" C. Manriquez
- Gwen Zamora as Alejandra Villa Ignacio-Padilla
- Michael de Mesa as Lloyd Manansala
- Rita Avila as Claire Cunanan / Alice Cunanan-Manriquez
- Pinky Amador as Delia Cunanan
- Juan Rodrigo as Leandro Padilla
- Ralph Fernandez as Lucas "Luke" Manansala
- Lovely Rivero as Corazon "Cora" Isidro-Manansala
- Luz Fernandez as Belenita "Belen" Fuentebella

Guest cast

- Elijah Alejo as younger Esperanza / Alejandra
- Ryza Cenon as Priscilla Manansala
- Will Ashley as younger Dencio
- Leandro Baldemor as Cenon Manriquez
- Menggie Cobarrubias as Fernan Villa Ignacio
- Marco Alcaraz as Juanito Padilla
- Marnie Lapus as Malou

== Ratings ==
According to AGB Nielsen Philippines' Mega Manila household television ratings, the pilot episode of Innamorata earned a 12.2% rating. The final episode scored a 15.3% rating.

== Accolades ==
Accolades received by Innamorata
Year	Award	Category	Recipient	Result	Ref.
2014	28th PMPC Star Awards for Television	Best Daytime Drama Series	Innamorata	Nominated	
