= Kokak =

Philippine television drama series

- Title card
- Also known as: The Frog Princess
- Genre: Fantasy drama
- Based on: Kokak by Ruben Marcelino
- Developed by: Richard Cruz
- Directed by: Ricky Davao
- Creative director: Jun Lana
- Starring: Sarah Lahbati
- Theme music composer: Arnel de Pano
- Opening theme: "Dakilang Katapatan" by Rocco Nacino
- Country of origin: Philippines
- Original language: Tagalog
- No. of episodes: 80

Production
- Executive producer: Joy Lumboy-Pili
- Production locations: Metro Manila, Philippines
- Camera setup: Multiple-camera setup
- Running time: 30–45 minutes
- Production company: GMA Entertainment TV

Original release
- Network: GMA Network
- Release: November 14, 2011 – March 2, 2012

Kokak (international title: The Frog Princess) is a Philippine television drama fantasy series broadcast by GMA Network. The series is based on a comics serial of the same title created by Ruben Marcelino and published in Darna Komiks. Directed by Ricky Davao, it stars Sarah Lahbati in the title role. It premiered on November 14, 2011, on the network's Afternoon Prime line up. The series concluded on March 2, 2012, with a total of 80 episodes.

== Cast and characters ==
Lead cast

- Sarah Lahbati as Kokak / Kara

Supporting cast

- TJ Trinidad as Carlito "Carl" Asuncion
- JC Tiuseco as Roco Valencia
- Vaness del Moral as Elizabeth Mampusti
- Gary Estrada as Renato Asuncion
- Jessa Zaragoza as Angela Francisco-Asuncion
- Caridad Sanchez as Roberta "Berta" Francisco
- Deborah Sun as Veronica Asuncion
- Frencheska Farr as Raphalyn "Rafa" Valencia
- Ervic Vijandre as Borge Reyes

Recurring cast

- Diva Montelaba as Cheenee Macagaling
- Gian Magdangal as Norman Francisco
- Rox Montealegre as Lileth Zabala
- Shyr Valdez as Bing Altamirano

Guest cast

- Angelika Dela Cruz as Vicky Asuncion
- Pen Medina as Isko Pulido
- Ella Cruz as younger Kara
- Francis Magundayao as young Carl
- Ella Guevara as younger Elizabeth

== Ratings ==
According to AGB Nielsen Philippines' Mega Manila household television ratings, the pilot episode of Kokak earned a 14% rating. The final episode scored a 19.8% rating.
