= My Lover, My Wife =

2011 Philippine television drama series

- Title card
- Genre: Romantic drama
- Created by: Denoy Navarro-Punio
- Written by: Suzette Doctolero; Karen Lustica; Onay Sales; Tina Velasco
- Directed by: Jay Altarejos
- Creative director: Jun Lana
- Starring: Nadine Samonte; Maxene Magalona; Luis Alandy
- Theme music composer: Jobart Bartolome; Tata Betita
- Opening theme: "Kung Maaari Lang" by Kyla
- Country of origin: Philippines
- Original language: Tagalog
- No. of episodes: 63

Production
- Executive producer: Meann P. Regala
- Camera setup: Multiple-camera setup
- Running time: 30—45 minutes
- Production company: GMA Entertainment TV

Original release
- Network: GMA Network
- Release: February 28 – May 27, 2011

My Lover, My Wife is a 2011 Philippine television drama romance series broadcast by GMA Network. Directed by Jay Altajeros, it stars Nadine Samonte, Luis Alandy and Maxene Magalona. It premiered on February 28, 2011 on the network's Dramarama sa Hapon line up. The series concluded on May 27, 2011, with a total of 63 episodes.

== Cast and characters ==
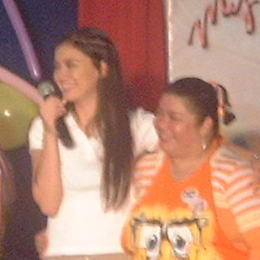
Nadine Samonte (left) portrays April Romero

Lead cast

- Nadine Samonte as April Romero-Salvador
- Luis Alandy as Lawrence Delgado / Arthur Salvador
- Maxene Magalona as Vivian Torres-Delgado

Supporting cast

- Marco Alcaraz as Arthur Salvador
- Carmi Martin as Charity Romero
- Ernie Garcia as Roman Torres
- Maybelyn dela Cruz as Ellen Torres
- Jace Flores as Cesar
- Princess Snell as Hazel
- Rox Montealegre as Lyka
- Zyrael Jestre as Nicolo Delgado
- Dion Ignacio as Jordan
- Fianca Cruz as Meah
- Ernie Garcia as Ramon
- Robert Ortega as Oscar
- Prince Stefan as Dong
- Ray Ann Dulay as Gomez

Guest cast

- Richard Quan as Arnel Castro
- Mia Pangyarihan as Bianca

== Production ==
Principal photography concluded on May 16, 2011.

== Ratings ==
According to AGB Nielsen Philippines' Mega Manila People/Individual television ratings, the pilot episode of My Lover, My Wife earned an 8.4% rating. The final episode scored an 18.9% rating in Mega Manila household television ratings.
