= Love Is Blind (2016 film) =

- Directed by: Jason Paul Laxamana
- Written by: Jason Paul Laxamana
- Produced by: Lily Y. Monteverde; Roselle Y. Monteverde
- Starring: Derek Ramsay; Kiray Celis; Solenn Heussaff; Kean Cipriano
- Cinematography: Mo Zee
- Edited by: Bebs Gohetia
- Music by: Jesse Lucas
- Production companies: Regal Entertainment Inc.; Regal Multimedia Inc.
- Distributed by: GMA Films; ABS-CBN International Distribution (United States releases)
- Release date: February 10, 2016
- Running time: 96 minutes
- Country: Philippines
- Languages: Filipino; English
- Box office: ₱39.2 million

Love Is Blind is a 2016 Philippine fantasy-romantic comedy film written and directed by Jason Paul Laxamana and produced by Regal Entertainment Inc. The film stars Derek Ramsay, Solenn Heussaff, Kiray Celis and Kean Cipriano. It was released on February 10, 2016, under Regal Films.

In Love Is Blind, the main character, Fe, played by Kiray Celis, uses a magic potion that causes her handsome crush Wade (Derek Ramsay) to see her as more attractive than she actually is.

== Plot ==
The film starts with Fe (Kiray Celis) being pimped out by her aunt (Beverly Salviejo). Fe knows that with her sister being beautiful, people will ask inappropriate questions regarding her looks, and her chances of finding true love are limited since looks don't matter when finding partners. So she hunts down her probable suitor and leaves for work. Fe is an intern at Luxent Hotel in Quezon City. There she meets Wade (Derek Ramsay), who is about to attend a conference about farming. Wade doesn’t really want to be a farmer or want anything to do with their family’s business even though it was theirs longer than he knows.

Wade is experiencing a fallout with his girlfriend Maggie (Solenn Heussaff) because he’s pressured of being better than himself and what others think of him, especially his high school friends. Fe’s admiration to Wade grows more as time progresses, seeing him every day at work but being able to do anything about it frustrates her. She goes to Yari (Kean Cipriano), who conveniently works as a masseur at the hotel but also sells potions and charms for hopeless cases on love. Yari helps Fe with her problem with Wade, making her a potion that would make her the most beautiful person in the eyes of Wade alone. Fe named herself Felicity for Wade. But in the process Yari is falling in love with Fe.

However, the potion Yari made for Fe doesn’t have the right ingredients resulting it to wear off and revealing Fe’s true looks to Wade. After a fight, Wade and Fe clear and patch things up as Wade returns to the arms of his love, Maggie. Fe realizes that all along, there was someone there who cares for her, Yari. But as soon as she confronts him, he saw the same ingredients they made for an everlasting love potion with their picture in it. Fe confused, storms out and thought that she was bewitched by Yari for him to love her. But the two did not know that the contents of the potion were replaced by pure water.

While Fe drowns herself in pity as she lost the chance at love, she is disturbed by a shouting Yari who rushed to her once he knew about the potion being replaced. The two ended up together and Fe eventually realized that there’s someone who can love her the way that she is.

== Cast ==
- Derek Ramsay as Wade Santillan
- Kiray Celis as Fe
- Solenn Heussaff as Maggie / Felicity
- Kean Cipriano as Yari Baltazar
- Chynna Ortaleza as Ms. Janet
- Ken Alfonso as Zach
- Albert Sumaya Jr. as Sawali
- Maureen Larrazabal as Ms. Noemi
- Beverly Salviejo as Apung Kring Kring
- Johnny Revilla as Wade's Dad
- Kiko Matos as Anthony
- Niña Jose as Gracie
- Lemuel Pelayo as Roger
- Jef Gaitan as Diorella
- Rolando Inocencio as Facilitator
- Izzy Canillo as Binhi
- Kleggy Abaya as Boods
- EJ Jallorina as Uma
- Maey Bautista as Crying Lady in the Beach
- Gonzalo Matos as Arnold
- Lawrence Yap as Yuan
- Rolini Pineda as Fatima
