= List of Innamorata episodes =

Innamorata is a 2014 Philippine television drama romantic fantasy series broadcast by GMA Network. It premiered on the network's Afternoon Prime line up from February 17, 2014 to June 20, 2014, replacing Magkano Ba ang Pag-ibig?.

Mega Manila ratings are provided by AGB Nielsen Philippines.

== Series overview ==
Month	Episodes	Monthly Averages
Month	Episodes	Mega Manila
February 2014	10	11.6%
March 2014	21	12.6%
April 2014	20	12.8%
May 2014	22	12.8%
June 2014	15	12.6%
Total	88	12.5%

== Episodes ==
=== February 2014 ===
Episodes	Original air date	AGB Nielsen Ratings (Mega Manila)	Timeslot Rank	Daytime Rank	Ref.
Episode 1	February 17, 2014	12.2%	#1	#5	
Episode 2	February 18, 2014	10.3%	#1	#8	
Episode 3	February 19, 2014	10.6%	#1	#7	
Episode 4	February 20, 2014	10.4%	#1	#8	
Episode 5	February 21, 2014	12.3%	#1	#5	
Episode 6	February 24, 2014	11.6%	#1	#7	
Episode 7	February 25, 2014	12.7%	#1	#6	
Episode 8	February 26, 2014	11.9%	#1	#5	
Episode 9	February 27, 2014	11.5%	#1	#6	
Episode 10	February 28, 2014	12.2%	#1	#5	

=== March 2014 ===
No.	Title	Original air date	AGB Nielsen Ratings (Mega Manila)	Timeslot Rank	Daytime Rank	Ref.
11	"Gina Ruins Esperanza and Edwin's Relationship"	March 3, 2014	13.2%	#1	#4	
Edwin denies his father's wishes to wed Gina, prompting her to ruin his relationship with Esperanza. Will their love for each other endure or not?
12	"Gina and Edwin Confront Esperanza"	March 4, 2014	12.9%	#1	#5	
While Dencio persuades Esperanza to avoid Edwin, the latter convinces Gina to tell her the truth about their relationship.
13	"A Lover's Sacrifice"	March 5, 2014	11.8%	#1	#5	
Gina is unknowingly being followed by her father to find his way to her mother, Alice. As Cenon finally sees the latter and attempts to murder her, Edwin sacrifices himself to protect Esperanza, who would've taken the bullet if not for him.
14	"A Desperate Woman's Fake Pregnancy"	March 6, 2014	12.9%	#1	#4	
Gina becomes desperate in ruining Edwin and Esperanza's relationship by making up lies about her pregnancy. Meanwhile, Alejandra thinks it's time for the latter to give her something she wants in return for her beauty.
15	"The Guy Who Broke Alejandra's Heart"	March 7, 2014	13.0%	#1	#4	
Alejandra thought that she will get the happiness she deserves if she becomes beautiful. However, she never knew that all of these will come at an expense.
16	"Unraveling Alejandra and Arnaldo's Story"	March 10, 2014	11.0%	#1	#7	
Esperanza continues to read Alejandra's diary and unravels the latter and Arnaldo's love story, as well as what happened to the necklace.
17	"Alejandra's Haunted Love"	March 11, 2014	13.1%	#1	#5	
After finding out about his grandfather's past, Edwin accidentally meets Alejandra, the latter's greatest love who's already dead.
18	"A Kiss from the Past"	March 12, 2014	10.7%	#1	#8	
After knowing the fact Edwin is in love with her granddaughter Esperanza, Alejandra only becomes more determined to ruin their relationship as she's convinced he's Arnaldo, her greatest love.
19	"Alejandra's Madness from Her Greatest Love"	March 13, 2014	13.4%	#1	#5	
Alejandra becomes more desperate and forceful in making Esperanza leave Edwin for her own satisfaction--leaving the former in a difficult situation.
20	"Two Women Fighting for One Man"	March 14, 2014	11.9%	#1	#6	
Esperanza will do everything she can to escape from Alejandra and save the man of his life from her own great grandmother.
21	"Arnaldo Comes Back to Life"	March 17, 2014	11.0%	#1	#8	
With perseverance, Alejandra successfully resurrects Arnaldo using Edwin's body, resulting in Esperanza's heartbreak.
22	"A Love to Remember"	March 18, 2014	13.3%	#1	#4	
After Arnaldo possessed Edwin's body, Esperanza tries to make the latter recover his true identity. Will her love be enough to recover his memories?
23	"Esperanza Gets Trapped Inside the Painting"	March 19, 2014	14.1%	#1	#4	
After Edwin got his memories back and reconciled with his fiancée, Alejandra has a new plan to separate them from each other again--trap Esperanza inside the painting she used to be in.
24	"Edwin Deceives Alejandra for Love"	March 20, 2014	12.6%	#1	#7	
After Dencio saw Esperanza inside the painting, he called Edwin for help and formed a plan with him--make the latter pretend to be his grandfather Arnaldo then take Alejandra's necklace off her to free his friend.
25	"Edwin and Esperanza Prepare for their Wedding"	March 21, 2014	12.3%	#1	#8	
After the bloody encounter with Alejandra, Edwin and Esperanza continue their wedding but someone still wants to ruin their day.
26	"Alice Finds Out Esperanza is Her Daughter"	March 24, 2014	14.1%	#1	#7	
After so many times of being denied information by her cousin Delia, Alice was shocked to find out that Esperanza is her daughter. In the same situation, Lloyd also discovered his son is actually Dencio.
27	"Esperanza's Newfound Family"	March 25, 2014	12.5%	#1	#11	
Alice finally told Esperanza that she is her missing daughter while the latter and Gina made up their differences. The three of them decided to move in together into the mansion to start anew.
28	"Esperanza and Edwin's Troubles Before the Wedding"	March 26, 2014	12.6%	#1	#13	
Esperanza tried to break it off with her fiancé until she discovered that Gina has been lying about her brain tumor. Meanwhile, Edwin finds out Dencio is his brother.
29	"Gina Ruins Esperanza and Edwin's Wedding"	March 27, 2014	13.9%	#1	#9	
Edwin and Esperanza's wedding ends up in a disaster when Gina took off the magical necklace from the latter, revealing her true appearance.
30	"Esperanza's Distress Leads to Danger!"	March 28, 2014	11.5%	#1	#13	
Esperanza attempts to kill herself after Edwin rejected her on their wedding day.
31	"Alejandra Possesses Gina's Body"	March 31, 2014	12.1%	#2	#12	
While Esperanza is still missing, Alejandra takes advantage of the situation and possesses Gina's body so she could be with Edwin.

=== April 2014 ===
No.	Title	Original air date	AGB Nielsen Ratings (Mega Manila)	Timeslot Rank	Daytime Rank	Ref.
32	"The Return of Esperanza"	April 1, 2014	11.9%	#2	#13	
Esperanza finally decided to come home after realizing the importance of family. Meanwhile, Alejandra left Gina's body because she knows Edwin could never fall in love with her.
33	"Edwin and Dencio Fight Over Esperanza"	April 2, 2014	11.5%	#2	#13	
As Alejandra successfully possesses Esperanza's body, Edwin and Dencio will fight over her.
34	"Esperanza's Suspicious Behavior"	April 3, 2014	11.3%	#2	#14	
Dencio started to become suspicious of Esperanza's strange behavior and warns Edwin of Alejandra's ability to possess into bodies. Will they finally unravel the truth about her real identity?
35	"The Ritual That Will Bring Back Esperanza"	April 4, 2014	11.5%	#2	#15	
Dencio will ask the help of a faith healer to bring back Esper's spirit to her body. Will they succeed?
36	"The Blood That Will Fix Alejandra's Broken Necklace"	April 7, 2014	11.5%	#2	#15	
Esperanza, Dencio, and Edwin get stuck in an abandoned warehouse waiting for rescue, while Alejandra figures out a way to fix her magical necklace.
37	"Esperanza Chooses Between Dencio and Edwin"	April 8, 2014	11.8%	#2	#13	
Esperanza makes a decision to choose between her longtime best friend Dencio and her former fiancé Edwin.
38	"Belenita's Loyalty Leads Her to Death"	April 9, 2014	12.8%	#1	#12	
Refusing to follow Alejandra's plan because she couldn't take another person's life, Belenita sacrificed hers instead.
39	"The Return of Alejandra's Attacks"	April 10, 2014	13.5%	#1	#12	
Now that Alejandra has fixed her broken necklace, she will attack anyone who stands between her and Edwin.
40	"Alejandra Controls Edwin's Family"	April 11, 2014	13.4%	#1	#12	
Alejandra casts a spell on Edwin and his family to control their emotions and force him to fall in love with her. Will her plan work?
41	"Alejandra Threatens Esperanza's Life"	April 14, 2014	12.4%	#2	#14	
Edwin and Dencio finally figured out Alejandra is back torturing them as the latter threatens Esperanza's life again.
42	"Edwin Surrender Himself to Alejandra"	April 15, 2014	12.6%	#1	#13	
Edwin offered himself to Alejandra after realizing that she will not stop tormenting the person he loves until he comes with her.
43	"Edwin Gets Trapped in the Painting"	April 16, 2014	13.2%	#1	#12	
Alejandra managed to dispose of Edwin's body and bring his soul to her haven.
44	"Edwin Chooses Alejandra Over Esperanza"	April 21, 2014	11.8%	#1	#11	
Alejandra made Edwin return to his body to let Esperanza know that he willingly chose the former over her.
45	"Alejandra and Edwin's Agreement"	April 22, 2014	13.7%	#1	#9	
Edwin was left with no other choice but to comply with his agreement with Alejandra just to keep Esperanza safe.
46	"Esperanza's True Feelings"	April 23, 2014	14.2%	#1	#9	
Esperanza is still torn between her feelings for her boyfriend and ex-fiancé. Dencio then decided to give her time to think about what her heart really wants.
47	"Esperanza Stops Edwin and Alejandra's Wedding"	April 24, 2014	15.2%	#1	#9	
Esperanza managed to convince Edwin to back out from the wedding. Now, Alejandra is out for revenge.
48	"Dencio Gets Hostaged!"	April 25, 2014	14.4%	#1	#10	
Alejandra holds Dencio hostage and refuses to free him until she has Edwin back.
49	"Episode 49"	April 28, 2014	12.3%	#2	#15	
50	"Episode 50"	April 29, 2014	13.2%	#1	#13	
51	"Episode 51"	April 30, 2014	12.9%	#1	#12	

=== May 2014 ===
No.	Title	Original air date	AGB Nielsen Ratings (Mega Manila)	Timeslot Rank	Daytime Rank	Ref.
52	"Episode 52"	May 1, 2014	12.1%	#1	#12	
53	"Episode 53"	May 2, 2014	13.4%	#1	#12	
54	"Episode 54"	May 5, 2014	12.0%	#1	#10	
55	"Episode 55"	May 6, 2014	11.3%	#1	#13	
56	"Episode 56"	May 7, 2014	13.1%	#1	#7	
57	"Episode 57"	May 8, 2014	12.0%	#1	#13	
58	"Episode 58"	May 9, 2014	14.1%	#1	#6	
59	"Episode 59"	May 12, 2014	13.2%	#1	#9	
60	"Episode 60"	May 13, 2014	13.9%	#1	#9	
61	"Episode 61"	May 14, 2014	11.5%	#1	#13	
62	"Episode 62"	May 15, 2014	12.9%	#1	#10	
63	"Episode 63"	May 16, 2014	14.2%	#1	#5	
64	"Episode 64"	May 19, 2014	12.8%	#1	#8	
65	"Episode 65"	May 20, 2014	12.6%	#1	#10	
66	"Episode 66"	May 21, 2014	12.6%	#1	#11	
67	"Episode 67"	May 22, 2014	13.0%	#1	#8	
68	"Episode 68"	May 23, 2014	13.9%	#1	#8	
69	"Episode 69"	May 26, 2014	11.5%	#1	#11	
70	"Episode 70"	May 27, 2014	12.6%	#1	#10	
71	"Episode 71"	May 28, 2014	12.0%	#1	#12	
72	"Episode 72"	May 29, 2014	13.5%	#1	#7	
73	"Episode 73"	May 30, 2014	13.1%	#1	#7	

=== June 2014 ===
No.	Title	Original air date	AGB Nielsen Ratings (Mega Manila)	Timeslot Rank	Daytime Rank	Ref.
74	"Episode 74"	June 2, 2014	10.7%	#1	#12	
75	"Episode 75"	June 3, 2014	12.6%	#1	#6	
76	"Episode 76"	June 4, 2014	10.5%	#1	#11	
77	"Episode 77"	June 5, 2014	12.8%	#1	#8	
78	"Episode 78"	June 6, 2014	13.2%	#1	#5	
79	"Episode 79"	June 9, 2014	11.2%	#1	#10	
80	"Episode 80"	June 10, 2014	11.8%	#1	#9	
81	"Episode 81"	June 11, 2014	15.2%	#1	#4	
82	"Episode 82"	June 12, 2014	14.6%	#1	#7	
83	"Episode 83"	June 13, 2014	10.8%	#1	#13	
84	"Episode 84"	June 16, 2014	11.6%	#1	#7	
85	"Episode 85"	June 17, 2014	11.7%	#1	#7	
86	"Episode 86"	June 18, 2014	12.6%	#1	#6	
87	"Episode 87"	June 19, 2014	14.1%	#1	#4	
88	"Episode 88"	June 20, 2014	15.3%	#1	#3	
