= JC Tiuseco =

Filipino basketball player

- Born: John Carlo Barreras Tiuseco; April 16, 1985 (age 41)
- Occupations: Actor, model
- Years active: 2008–present
- Agent(s): GMA Artist Center (since 2008)
- Website: http://www.jctiuseco.net

John Carlo Barreras Tiuseco (born April 16, 1985), professionally known as JC Tiuseco, is a Filipino actor, basketball player, TV host and model.He achieved fame after participating in and winning the first season of Survivor Philippines.

== Personal life ==
Tiuseco was born in Manila, son of James Tiuseco, a businessman and his wife, Rosemarie Barreras, a registered nurse cum businesswoman. He has 2 siblings, Vivian Tiuseco (who manages the family business and own business) and Karl Anthony Tiuseco (has own business).

== Early life ==
Tiuseco spent his grade school days in Chiang Kai Shek College and studied in San Sebastian College-Recoletos, Manila during high school.

He was passionate about basketball since his childhood and dreamed of becoming a professional player. He played with jersey #12 as a member of the San Sebastian College basketball team, which competes in NCAA Philippines. He graduated with a bachelor's degree in management.

== Modelling career ==
Tiuseco also works as a model. His most notable job was the Bench Denim and Underwear Fashion Show. He also placed second to his basketball teammate Ram Sagad (Pinoy Fear Factor contestant) in the 2007 Century Tuna Superbods Beachfest, and has appeared in one of Century Tuna's television advertisements.

In 2007, he landed a spot as one of Cosmopolitan Magazine's 69 Hot Bachelors.

== Survivor Philippines ==
Tiuseco won the first season of Survivor Philippines in 2008. He defeated Robert Vincent "Rob" Sy, 7–2, with the seventh vote resulting from him winning a popularity vote. Tiuseco's win was already leaked months earlier, however, when a showbiz-oriented website published the alleged results of the Final Tribal Council in October 2008 after two of the show's staff were overheard in a coffee shop about the show's outcome. Paolo Bediones, the host of the show, labeled that website's report as a spoiler when that article first appeared.

== Post-Survivor Philippines ==
Tiuseco stated that Survivor Philippines had a significant impact on his life. Teaching him to appreciate what he has and helping him develop greater confidence in facing challenges.

Because of his good looks, many people were speculating that Tiuseco will enter the world of show business. He said that if there's an opportunity given to him, he'll probably enter show business. He is currently taking up a dance workshop and voice lessons in University of the Philippines.

He is currently hosting in the GMA Network weekday morning show, Unang Hirit. He is also the endorser of Elements, the new perfume of Penshoppe as well as the clothing apparel. As an actor, Tiuseco played minor roles in GMA shows until he was given a major role of Troy (originally played by Tonton Gutierrez) in Sine Novela: Kung Aagawin Mo ang Lahat sa Akin, alongside Maxene Magalona, Patrick Garcia and Glaiza de Castro.

== Filmography ==
=== Film ===
Year	Title	Role	Note(s)	Ref(s).
2010	The Red Shoes	Bongbong Marcos		
2010	Mamarazzi	Ray		
2012	Shake, Rattle and Roll Fourteen: The Invasion	Private First Class Tomas Pugeda		
2018	The Significant Other	Lester		
2019	The Annulment	Paulo		
2023	Penduko	Jude		
2024	Road Trip	Gabriel		
2024	40			

=== Television ===
Year	Show	Role	Note(s)	Ref(s).
2008	Survivor Philippines	Sole Survivor		
2009	Unang Hirit	Himself (host)		
2009	Dear Friend: Karibal	Kiko		
2009	Sine Novela: Kung Aagawin Mo ang Lahat sa Akin	Troy Samaniago		
2009–2010	Sana Ngayong Pasko	Bernie		
2010	Full House	Marcus		
2010	Langit sa Piling Mo	Jerry Narciso		
2010	X-Life	Himself (host)		
2011	Sisid	Ahmed		
2011	Ruben Marcelino's Kokak	Roco		
2012	Spooky Nights: Kasambahay	Jeff/Edward		
2012	My Daddy Dearest	Chris 'CJ' Javier		
2012	Temptation of Wife	Bernard		
2013	Teen Gen	Harold		
2013	Indio	Diego Silang		
2013	Maghihintay Pa Rin	Ricky Alvarado		
2013	Adarna	Heron		
2014–2015	The Half Sisters	Carl Valdicañas	168 episodes	
2014	Wagas	Raffy Tima		
2014	Ilustrado	Antonio Luna		
2015	Pari 'Koy	Timoteo "Timo" Espiritu		
2015	Destiny Rose	Lance		
2015	Imbestigador: Ang Kwento ni Jasmine	Christoper Castro		
2016	Sinungaling Mong Puso	Jolo		
2017	Mulawin vs. Ravena	Tangos		
2017	Imbestigador: Mag Inang Massacre	Placido "Jimmy" Villanueva		
2017	Tsuperhero	Ahmed		
2018	Onanay	Ronald		
2019	Dragon Lady	young James		
2019	Love You Two	Kris		
2022	Imbestigador: Tarlac Pugot Ulo	Vivencio Colipano		
2022	Mano Po Legacy: The Flower Sisters	Robert Collantes		

== Awards ==
Year	Award-giving body	Category	Work	Result
2009	PMPC Star Awards for TV	Best Male TV Personality	Unang Hirit	Nominated
