= Sarah Lahbati =

Filipino–Moroccan actress

- Born: October 9, 1993 (age 33); Geneva, Switzerland
- Occupation: Actress
- Years active: 2009–present
- Agents: Sparkle GMA Artist Center (2009–2015) Viva Artists Agency; (2015–present)
- Spouse: Richard Gutierrez (m. 2020; sep. 2024)
- Children: 2
- Awards: StarStruck 5 Ultimate female survivor

Sarah Lahbati-Gutierrez(born 9 October 1993) is a Swiss-born Filipino-Moroccan actress. She gained media attention as a finalist on the 5th season of reality show StarStruck, a Philippine overall talent show broadcast on GMA Network. Lahbati declared StarStruck V's Ultimate Female Survivors after nine weeks of the competition. Together with Steven Silva, they each won P1.5 million cash prize and an exclusive contract with GMA Network, with a minimum guarantee of P3.5 million.

== Early life and education ==
Lahbati was born in Geneva, Switzerland to a Filipina mother and a Moroccan father. She began her studies in Switzerland before moving to the Philippines.

== Career ==
Lahbati made her screen debut as Bong Revilla's daughter in Hokus Pokus. After joining and winning the fifth season of hit reality show StarStruck, Lahbati topbilled GMA Network's drama series, Kokak (2011) and Makapiling Kang Muli (2012) along with her real-life partner Richard Gutierrez. She also starred in different GMA shows such as Love Bug Presents: Exchange of Hearts (2011), Little Star, Koreana and Time of My Life. She also performed in GMA Network's variety show Party Pilipinas and Sunday All Stars as a regular artist.

In 2015, Lahbati transferred to the rival network, ABS-CBN, after her contract under GMA Artist Center expired. She officially joined Viva Artists Agency in June 2015. Tagged as Dance Goddess, Lahbati is a regular performer on ABS-CBN's Sunday variety show, ASAP.

Lahbati was cast in the ABS-CBN soap opera, Written in Our Stars, starring Toni Gonzaga, Piolo Pascual, Jolina Magdangal and Sam Milby which started early 2017. In 2017, she was also cast as Valentina, the Goddess of Snakes, in the movie Darna released by Star Cinema and Reality Entertainment.

Lahbati appears in E! Philippines reality show It Takes Gutz To Be a Gutierrez.

She is currently working as supporting actress in ABS-CBN playing extra and minor projects.

== Personal life ==
On March 14, 2020, Lahbati married actor Richard Gutierrez in Taguig. They have two sons together, Zion (born April 29, 2013) and Kai (born March 21, 2018). Lahbati confirmed on March 1, 2024, that she and Gutierrez were separated but stated that they are coparenting their sons, Zion and Kai. In January 2025, Gutierrez said that they were seeking an annulment.

== Lawsuit ==
In late 2012, Lahbati used her Twitter account to express her dissatisfaction with her network, GMA and expressed her desire to be released from her contract. On January 10, 2013, GMA Network and GMA Films president, Annette Gozon-Abrogar, counter-sued Lahbati, and on the following day, January 11, 2013, the network filed a formal complaint against Sarah Lahbati for breach of contract. She was facing multiple charges. In a related article published in PEP last 9 January 2013, Felipe Gozon, the head of GMA Network, released a statement indicating he did not guarantee protection that Sarah Lahbati said she was due. A few days later, Lahbati left the Philippines for Switzerland "to study". In August 2013, Lahbati returned to the Philippines to face the charges against her. It was later revealed that Lahbati left for Switzerland to give birth to her son with Richard Gutierrez in May 2013 at the age of 19.

== Filmography ==
=== Film ===
Year	Title	Role
2010	White House	Pim
2012	Boy Pick-Up: The Movie	Queen
2013	Seduction	Trina
2014	Basement	Eliza
2015	Liwanag sa Dilim	Minerva
2016	The Achy Breaky Hearts	Martha
2017	Ang Pagsanib Kay Leah dela Cruz	
2018	Fantastica	Cameo
2019	Mission Unstapabol: The Don Identity	Samantha

=== Television ===
Year	Title	Role
2009–2010	StarStruck	Herself / Contestant / Ultimate Female Survivor
2010–2012	Party Pilipinas	Herself/Performer
2010	Love Bug Presents: Exchange Of Hearts	Rachel
2010–2011	Little Star	Paula Estrella
2011	Maynila: Bestfriends & A Girl	Ina Kariran
2011	Time of My Life	Pia
2011	Spooky Nights Presents: Sumpa	Sarah
2011	Ikaw Lang ang Mamahalin	young Amara Luna
2011–2012	Ruben Marcelino's Kokak	Kokak/Kara
2012	Makapiling Kang Muli	Graciela Montes
2013	Indio	Ynaguiguinid
2013–2015	Sunday All Stars	Host/Herself/Performer
2014	Seasons of Love: BF for Hire, GF for Life	Samantha "Sam" Villareal
2014–2019	It Takes Gutz to Be a Gutierrez	Herself
2015	Ipaglaban Mo: Tiwalang Nasira	Nora
2015–2017	ASAP	Herself / co-host / Performer
2015	Maalaala Mo Kaya: Karaoke	Monica Cuenco
2016	Maalaala Mo Kaya: Gitara	Mia
2016	My Super D	Ulah / Tiradora
2017	The Promise of Forever	Elizabeth Dela Paz
2018	Eat Bulaga!	Herself / Co-host
2023	E.A.T.	Herself / Guest
2023	The Iron Heart	cameo
2024	Frontline Pilipinas	Guest
2024	Lumuhod Ka Sa Lupa	Mercy Balmores-Aguirre
2024	Eat Bulaga!	Guest player
2025	Bad Genius	Principal Perez

== Awards and nominations ==
Year	Award	Category	Nominated work	Result
2011	59th FAMAS Awards	German Moreno Youth Achievement Awardee	N/A	Won

== Notes ==
Awards and achievements
Preceded by Jewel Mische	StarStruck; 2009 (season 5)	Succeeded by Klea Pineda
