= Hope for the Flowers =

1972 novel by Trina Paulus

- First edition
- Author: Trina Paulus
- Language: English
- Genre: Fable
- Publisher: Paulist Press
- Publication date: September 1972
- Publication place: United States
- Media type: Print (hardcover)
- Pages: 160
- ISBN: 0-8091-0174-2

Hope for the Flowers is an allegorical novel by Trina Paulus. It was first published in 1972 and reflects the idealism of the counterculture of the period. Often categorized as a children's novel, it is a fable "partly about life, partly about revolution and lots about hope – for adults and others including caterpillars who can read". The two focal characters are caterpillars named Yellow and Stripe. They begin their search for meaning by attempting to climb to the top of a caterpillar pillar only to discover another destiny.

The novel has been translated into Spanish, Dutch, German, Brazilian Portuguese, Russian, Korean, Chinese, Japanese, Kurdish, Thai, Hebrew, Arabic, Persian, French, Turkish, and Swahili.

== Plot summary ==
It all starts when Stripe, the main character, first hatches from an egg. He begins his life by eating the leaf he was born on. He realizes that there must be "more" to life than just eating leaves. He senses there must be a way to get up into the sky. He searches for a way and finds himself at the base of a pillar made up of caterpillars. They are all struggling to get up into the sky as well. Here he meets Yellow who also wants to get up into the sky by climbing to the top of the pillar. But she feels bad about what must be done to achieve this goal. You have to literally step on and climb over all the other caterpillars who are also trying to reach the top of the pillar.

The two of them eventually decide to stop climbing and go back down the pillar. They live together for a while. But Stripe's curiosity and unrest overcome him and he decides that he must get to the top of the pillar. Stripe says good-bye to Yellow. He focuses, adapts, and drives to reach the top, and eventually he succeeds at being on the top of the caterpillar pillar. This results in disillusionment, as he takes in a vast vista of other caterpillar pillars. Is this all there is at the top? He has not really gotten in to the sky. He just has a view of other caterpillars struggling to reach the top of their respective caterpillar pillars.

Yellow, however, has followed her instincts, continues to eat and then spins a cocoon. She eventually emerges from the cocoon transformed into a butterfly and flies into the sky effortlessly. She has found the real answer to the feeling that there must be more to life than eating leaves, and the question of who caterpillars really are. She is waiting for the disillusioned Stripe as he descends the pillar and eventually reaches the ground again. She shows Stripe her empty cocoon, and he eventually realizes what he needs to do. Stripe makes a cocoon of his own. Yellow waits for him. Stripe emerges transformed into a butterfly, and they fly off together.

== Adaptations ==
=== Theatre ===
A two-act musical adaptation of Hope for the Flowers was written by Ariel Escasa, a Filipino composer and lyricist. It was most recently staged in 2006 by the Ateneo Blue Repertory, a musical theater organization in the Ateneo de Manila University, under the direction of Macky Santiago.

Xan S. Johnson, PhD, Professor, Department of Theater, University of Utah, produced a musical stage version of Hope for Flowers, choreographed by Darlene Casanova.

=== Music ===
The Waddling Fools, a musical group based at Rancho Mastatal in Costa Rica, and in Montclair, New Jersey, performed the song "Hope for the Flowers" at Bioneers by the Bay, sponsored by the Marion Institute, in New Bedford, Massachusetts, in October 2009, and the song appears on the CD Canta No Llore: The Songs of Mastatal, which benefits the Mastate Charitable Foundation. At the same conference, author Trina Paulus presented a workshop titled "Hope for the Flowers." Said song, written by Alan Smith, Erin Campbell, Nate Sander and Britt Willey, has since been recorded in studio by Smith's Montclair-base band, The Porchistas.

Hope for the Flowers was also a short-lived psychedelic, sunshine-pop band founded by Evan Hurley and Jacob Judd in 2005. While residing in Oregon, the band picked up many new members (most notably Shawn Kilmer), began experimenting more with electronic music, and changed their name to Imaginary Flowers. As of 2009, the band is defunct.
