= Solenn Heussaff =

Filipino actress, model and singer (born 1985)

- Born: Solenn Marie Adea Heussaff; July 20, 1985 (age 41); Makati, Metro Manila, Philippines
- Citizenship: Philippines; France
- Occupations: VJ; actress; fashion designer; model; make-up artist; TV host; painter; singer
- Years active: 2000–2022; 2024–present
- Agents: GMA Artist Center (2010–2016); APT Entertainment (2010); Regal Entertainment (2011–present)
- Known for: Encantadia
- Height: 1.68 m (5 ft 6 in)
- Spouse: Nico Bolizico (m. 2016)
- Children: 2
- Relatives: Erwan Heussaff (brother); Anne Curtis (sister-in-law)

Solenn Marie Adea Heussaff-Bolzico (Tagalog pronunciation: [ˈhjusap]; born July 20, 1985) is a Filipino actress, model, singer and painter. She rose to prominence as a contestant on Survivor Philippines: Celebrity Showdown (2010), where she finished as a runner-up. In December 2010, Heussaff signed a recording contract with MCA Music, a film contract with Regal Entertainment, and a television contract with GMA Network and GMA Artist Center.

== Early life and education ==
Solenn Marie Adea Heussaff is the second child of Cynthia Adea, a Filipina, and Louis Paul Heussaff, a former sailor in the French Navy from Douarnenez, in Brittany, who was the head of a service company SOS for the petroleum industry. She has an older sister named Vanessa and a younger brother, Erwan.

After graduating from Eurocampus (now European International School), Heussaff went on to study fashion design in Studio Berçot, Paris for three years. She also took a 6-month course in basic beauty/fashion make-up, body painting and prosthetics at L'école Fleurimont, Paris. She then proceeded further studies at the Make Up Forever Academy.

== Career ==
=== Early career ===
Before she entered show business, Heussaff was an endorser of several products in and outside the country, such as Pop Cola, Kotex, Vitress Hair Solutions, Asian Secrets, Colgate, Argentina Corned Beef, Century Tuna, Greenwich Pizza and Pasta, Robinsons Land Corporation, Kenny Rogers Roasters, Axe, Holiday Ham and Milo NutriUp.

=== Survivor Philippines: Celebrity Showdown ===
She became one of the fan favorites in the reality show Survivor Philippines: Celebrity Showdown. She was also one of the most controversial castaways and even became one of the trending topics on Facebook and other social networking sites during the airing of the show. She ended up being one of the top three finalists alongside Ervic Vijandre and Akihiro Sato. The latter was declared winner.

=== Acting career ===
After Survivor Philippines, GMA Network already had several projects lined up for her. She became one of Richard Gutierrez's leading ladies in the film My Valentine Girls alongside Lovi Poe. In the film, she played the role of Richard's best friend who later became his girlfriend.

She was also chosen as one of the leading ladies of Richard Gutierrez in Mars Ravelo's Captain Barbell, a telefantasya which began airing in March 2011. She currently has a makeover show on GMA News TV which also started airing in March 2011. Her role was that of a reporter named Janna. She had a limited airing time in the show because of other projects such as Joey Gosiengfiao's Temptation Island in which she starred alongside Marian Rivera, Heart Evangelista, Lovi Poe and Rufa Mae Quinto.

In 2014, Heussaff played the female lead character in the independent film Mumbai Love opposite Kiko Matos.

=== Music career ===
Heussaff released her self-titled debut album on July 17, 2011, on Party Pilipinas. She then had her first autograph signing at SM Mall and Astroplus The Block on the same day. She held her first major concert from August 19 to 26, 2011 at Teatrino Promenade, Greenhills.

She released her second album entitled SOS on August 23, 2013. On August 25 after Heussaff performed her latest single, "Diva" featuring Ron Henley from her second album, she was awarded her first platinum award for her self-titled album.

In 2016, Heussaff released her third album, Solenn, on September 2 after a year of production. The album was inspired about love and she co-wrote most of the songs.

== Personal life ==
Heussaff is the sister of Erwan Heussaff, a food content creator, entrepreneur, and media producer who is the husband of actress Anne Curtis.

In 2012, Heussaff began dating Nico Bolzico, an Argentine businessman. In December 2014, she announced their engagement. They had their civil wedding in December 2015 in Esperanza, Argentina. Then the couple had another wedding on May 21, 2016, in Combourg, France.

They have two daughters together, Thylane Katana (born January 1, 2020) and Maëlys Lionel (born December 14, 2022).

== Filmography ==
=== Film ===
Year	Title	Role
2011	My Valentine Girls	Andie
2011	Joey Gosiengfiao's Temptation Island	Pura K.
2011	Yesterday, Today, Tomorrow	Selene
2012	Boy Pick-Up: The Movie	Angel
2012	D' Kilabots: Pogi Brothers (Weh?!?)	Lulu
2012	Sosy Problems: It Girls Just Wanna Have Fun	Margaux Bertrand
2013	Seduction	Sophia
2013	Status: It's Complicated!	Sylvia
2014	Mumbai Love	Ella
2014	Da Possessed	Anna Ignacio
2014	Nuno sa Punso	Hazel/Diwata Ania
2014	T'yanak	
2014	Shake, Rattle & Roll XV	Adela (cameo)
2015	Flotsam	Kai
2016	Lakbay2Love	Lianne
2016	Love Is Blind	Fe/Maggie
2017	All of You	
2018	My 2 Mommies	Monique Jose
2019	Misterio de la Noche	
2021	The Fabulous Filipino Brothers	Anna
2025	Unmarry	Maya

=== Television ===
Year	Title	Role
2010–2013	Party Pilipinas	Herself (co-host / performer)
2010	Survivor Philippines: Celebrity Showdown	Herself
2011	Mars Ravelo's Captain Barbell	Janna Rahmani
2011	Spooky Nights Presents: Da Mami	Beth
2011–2012	Bubble Gang	Herself
2011–2014	Fashbook	Herself (host)
2012	Legacy	Chloe Martin
2012	Eat Bulaga!	Herself (co-host)
2012–2022	Taste Buddies	Herself (host)
2013	Indio	Lalahon
2013–2015	Sunday All Stars	Herself (performer)
2013	Akin Pa Rin ang Bukas	Jade Carmelo
2014	Adarna	Ibong Adarna II / Daiana
2014	Ilustrado	Nellie Boustead
2015–2016	Marimar	Capuccina Blanchett
2016	A1 Ko Sa'yo	Miley
2016–2017	Encantadia	Bathalumang Cassiopea / Hara Durié Cassiope-a "Mata" / Hara Avria / Mitena
2017	Alyas Robin Hood	Iris Rebecca Lizeralde
2017–2018	All Star Videoke	Herself / Host
2018	The One That Got Away	Georgina "George" Martel
2018	Inday Will Always Love You	Joana
2018–2019	Cain at Abel	Abigail Buenaventura
2019	Love You Two	Lianne Martinez
2025–2026	Encantadia Chronicles: Sang'gre	Bathalumang Cassiopea / Hara Durié Cassiope-a "Mata"

=== Commercials ===
Year	Brands
2001–2003	Pop Cola
2006	Kotex with Dennis Trillo
2010	Cream Silk
2012, 2014	Colgate Optic White
2013	BENCH/ Body
2015	Axe
2016	Milo NutriUp

== Accolades ==
Year	Award	Category	Notes	Result	Ref.
2011	ENPRESS Golden Screen TV Awards	Outstanding Breakthrough Performance by an Actress	Mars Ravelo's Captain Barbell	Nominated	
2011	28th PMPC Star Awards for Movies	New Movie Actress of the Year	Temptation Island	Won	
2011	Gawad Urian Awards	Best Supporting Actress	Yesterday, Today & Tomorrow	Nominated	
2012	7th Myx Music Awards	Favorite Remake: Fire	"SOLENN" Album	Nominated	
2012	7th Myx Music Awards	Favorite New Artist	"SOLENN" Album	Nominated	
2012	PMPC Star Awards for Music	New Female Recording Artist of the Year	"SOLENN" Album	Won	
2012	Yahoo! Philippines OMG! Awards	Best Female Newcomer	—N/a	Won	
2012	43rd GMMSF Box-Office Entertainment Awards	Most Promising Female Star of the Year	Herself	Won	
2013	27th PMPC Star Awards for TV	Best Lifestyle Show Host	Fashbook	Won	
2014	FHM UK	Top 10 Hottest Nations in the World (w/ Kathryn Bernardo)	Herself	Top 5	
2017	12th Myx Music Awards	Favorite Myx Celebrity VJ	Herself	Nominated	
2017	31st PMPC Star Awards for Television	Best Lifestyle Show Host (with Rhian Ramos)	Taste Buddies	Won	
2025	51st Metro Manila Film Festival	Best Supporting Actress	Unmarry	Nominated	
