= My Daddy Dearest =

2012 Philippine television drama series

- Title card
- Genre: Drama
- Developed by: Denoy Navarro Punio
- Written by: Marlon Miguel; John Kenneth de Leon; Rona Sales
- Directed by: Don Michael Perez
- Creative director: Jun Lana
- Starring: Ogie Alcasid
- Theme music composer: Ogie Alcasid
- Opening theme: "My Daddy Dearest" by Milkcah Wynne Nacion
- Country of origin: Philippines
- Original language: Tagalog
- No. of episodes: 48

Production
- Executive producer: Leilani Feliciano Sandoval
- Producer: Lilybeth G. Rasonable
- Production locations: Metro Manila, Philippines
- Cinematography: Carlos Montaño, Jr.
- Camera setup: Multiple-camera setup
- Running time: 18–27 minutes
- Production company: GMA Entertainment TV

Original release
- Network: GMA Network
- Release: June 11 – August 17, 2012

My Daddy Dearest is a 2012 Philippine television drama series broadcast by GMA Network. Directed by Don Michael Perez, it stars Ogie Alcasid in the title role. It premiered on June 11, 2012 on the network's Telebabad line up. The series concluded on August 17, 2012, with a total of 48 episodes.

Originally titled as Bongga Ka Tay!, it was inspired by Sebastián Ortega's Lalola. The series is streaming online on YouTube.

== Premise ==
The series centers on Bong, played by Ogie Alcasid and his daughter Daisy, played by Milkcah Wynne Nacion. They've never been so close to each other and Bong, being a single parent and has no idea on how to raise his daughter all by himself. Daisy tried her best to get her dad's attention but because of one certain wish, everything goes beyond their imagination which changes Daisy's dad into a woman.

== Cast and characters ==
Cast

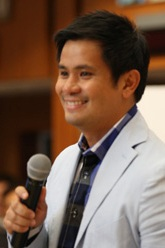
Ogie Alcasid

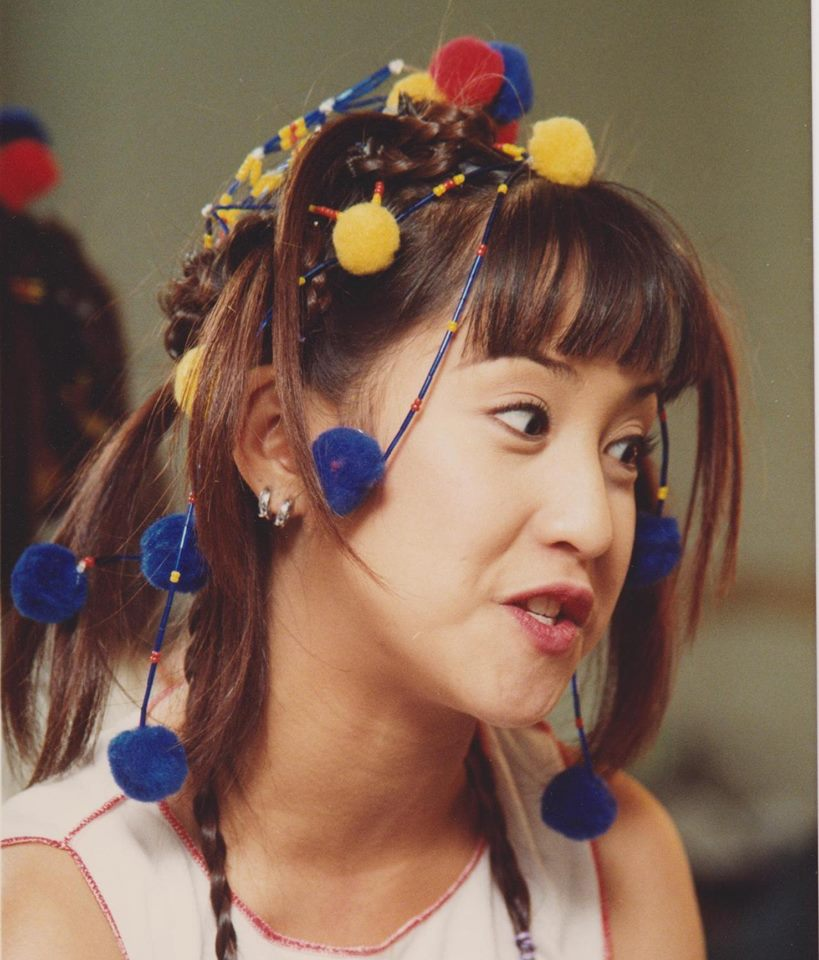
Jolina Magdangal

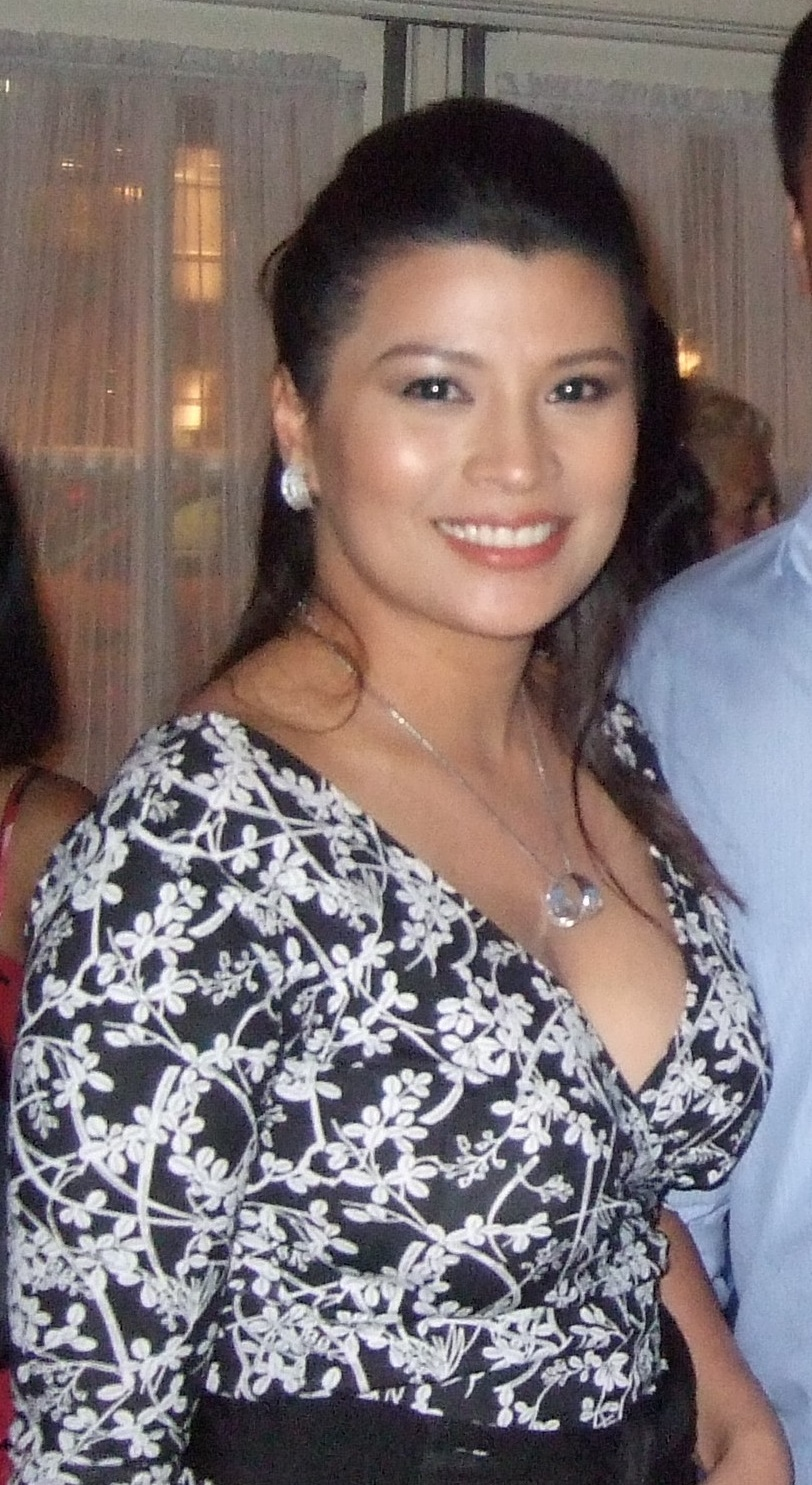
Mylene Dizon

Lead cast

- Ogie Alcasid as Bong Adonis / Sampaguita / Bong Adonis Clone

Supporting cast

- Jolina Magdangal as Rose Soriano-Adonis / Camilla
- Milkcah Wynne Nacion as Daisy Adonis
- JC Tiuseco as Chris 'CJ' Javier
- Pauleen Luna as Winnie / Annie / Minnie / Reyna Ada / Pixie characters
- Pinky Amador as Mercedes Adonis
- Mylene Dizon as Tiandra Soriano
- Kyle Danielle Ocampo as Lily
- Sherilyn Reyes as Daphne
- Pekto as Marco
- Ehra Madrigal as Ivy
- Menggie Cobarrubias as Juancho
- Richard Quan as Bryan
- Jan Manual as Jing
- Neil Ryan Sese as Val
- Nicky Castro as Junior

== Ratings ==
According to AGB Nielsen Philippines' Mega Manila household television ratings, the pilot episode of My Daddy Dearest earned a 14% rating. The final episode scored a 14.4% rating.
