= Kung Aagawin Mo ang Lahat sa Akin =

2009 Philippine television drama series

- Title card
- Also known as: When All is Gone
- Genre: Romantic drama
- Based on: Kung Aagawin Mo ang Lahat sa Akin (1987) by Eddie Garcia
- Directed by: Topel Lee; Rommel Gacho
- Starring: Maxene Magalona; Glaiza de Castro; JC Tiuseco; Patrick Garcia
- Theme music composer: Danny Tan
- Opening theme: "Kung Agawin Man ang Lahat sa Akin" by Eva Castillo
- Country of origin: Philippines
- Original language: Tagalog
- No. of episodes: 70

Production
- Executive producer: Camille Gomba-Montaño
- Production locations: Metro Manila, Philippines
- Camera setup: Multiple-camera setup
- Running time: 25–35 minutes
- Production company: GMA Entertainment TV

Original release
- Network: GMA Network
- Release: June 22 – September 25, 2009

Kung Aagawin Mo ang Lahat sa Akin (transl. if you take everything from me / international title: When All is Gone) is a 2009 Philippine television drama romance series broadcast by GMA Network. Based on a 1987 Philippine film of the same title, the series is the fifteenth instalment of Sine Novela. Directed by Topel Lee and Rommel Gacho, it stars Maxene Magalona, Glaiza de Castro, JC Tiuseco and Patrick Garcia. It premiered on June 22, 2009 on the network's Dramarama sa Hapon line up. The series concluded on September 25, 2009, with a total of 70 episodes.

== Cast and characters ==
Cast

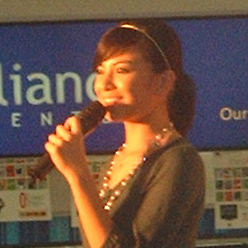
Glaiza de Castro

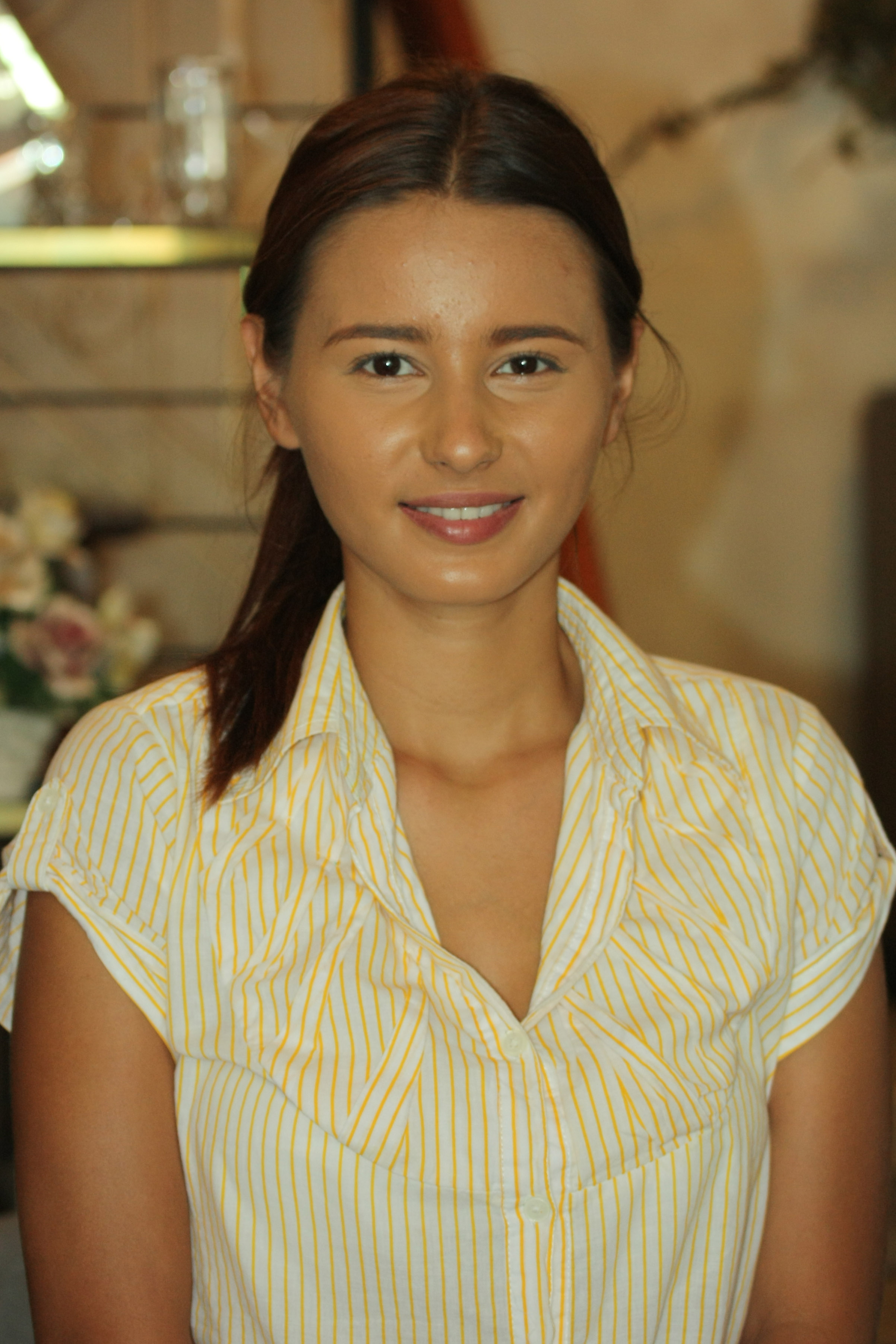
Jackie Rice

Lead cast

- Maxene Magalona as Maureen Andrada / Dahlia Del Monte
- Glaiza de Castro as Gladys Andrada
- Patrick Garcia as Arvin Samaniego
- JC Tiuseco as Troy Samaniego

Supporting cast

- Jackie Lou Blanco as Clara Andrada
- Nonie Buencamino as Gilbert Andrada
- Joanne Quintas as Romina Samaniego
- Emilio Garcia as Victor Samaniego
- Karla Estrada as Remy Del Monte / Brenda Aguirre
- Jackie Rice as Mercedita Andrada
- Pochollo Montes as Dean Del Monte
- Rich Asuncion as Joyce Delos Santos
- Aurora Sevilla as Rosita Aguirre
- Christine Joy Velasco as Maverick

Guest cast

- Francis Magundayao as younger Arvin
- Gail Lardizabal as younger Gladys

== Ratings ==
According to AGB Nielsen Philippines' Mega Manila household television ratings, the pilot episode of Kung Aagawin ang Lahat sa Akin earned an 18.6% rating. The final episode scored a 23.7% rating.

== Accolades ==
Accolades received by Kung Aagawin Mo ang Lahat sa Akin
Year	Award	Category	Recipient	Result	Ref.
2010	24th PMPC Star Awards for Television	Best Daytime TV Series	Kung Aagawin Mo ang Lahat sa Akin	Nominated	
