= Enzo Pineda =

Filipino actor

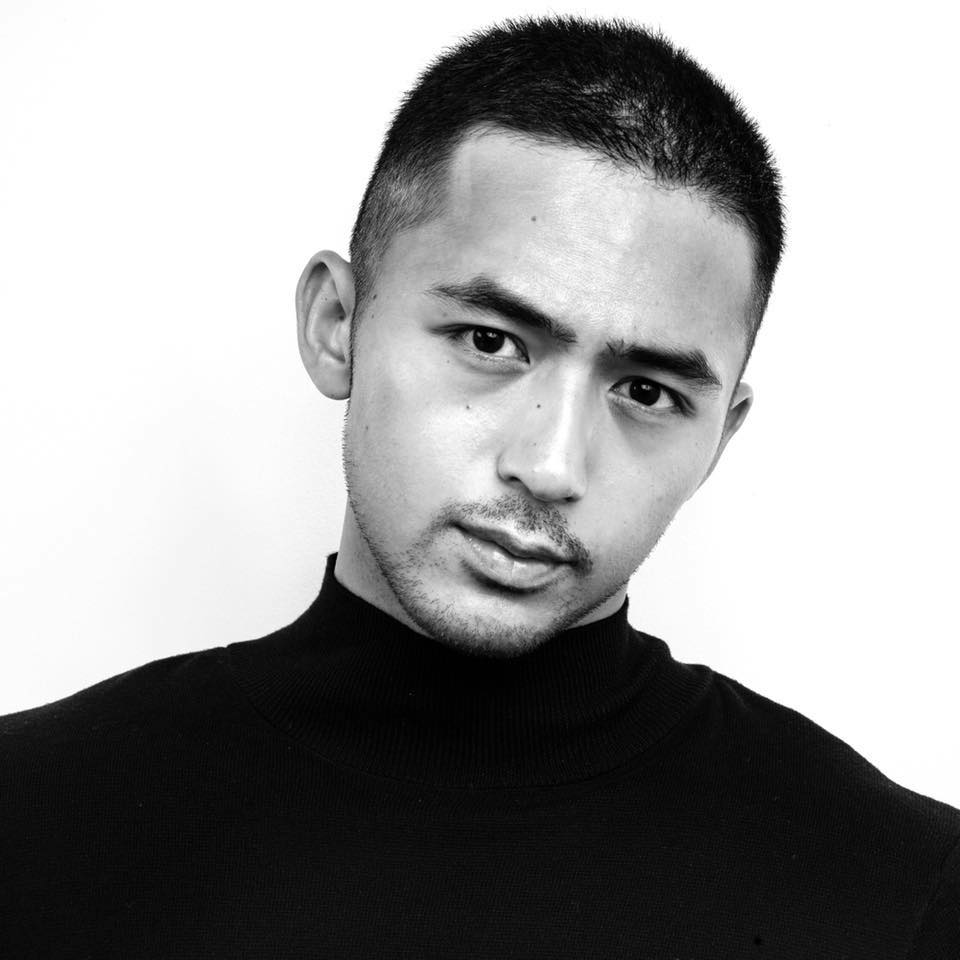
- Born: Enrico Lorenzo Macam Pineda; Makati, Philippines
- Other name: Enzo
- Occupation: Actor
- Years active: 2009–present
- Agents: Sparkle GMA Artist Center (2009–2016); Star Magic (2017–2025)
- Political party: SBP (2024–present)
- Partner: Michelle Vito (2020–present)
- Relatives: Jennylyn Mercado (cousin); Charee Pineda (cousin); Eliza Pineda (cousin)
- Military career
- Allegiance: Philippines
- Branch: Philippine Navy; Marine Reserve Command
- Service years: 2021–present
- Rank: Staff Sergeant

Enrico Lorenzo Macam Pineda is a Filipino actor. He is the finalist who won the title of First Prince in the GMA Network's fifth season of StarStruck.

== Filmography ==
=== Film ===
| Year | Title | Role |
|---|---|---|
| 2012 | My Kontrabida Girl | Enzo |
| 2014 | Basement | Jules |
| 2014 | Rice Soldiers | Enzo |
| 2014 | Bigkis | Enzo |
| 2016 | The Agony and Fury of Hermano Puli | Octavo |
| 2017 | Extra Service | Larry |
| 2017 | Bar Boys | Atty. Chris Carlson |
| 2018 | DOTGA: Da One That Ghost Away | Jack Colmenares |
| 2019 | Time and Again | Ozzie |
| 2019 | Malamaya | Migs |
| 2019 | Utopia | Mike |
| 2020 | He Who Is Without Sin | Lawrence |
| 2022 | Dok | |
| 2022 | Call Me Papi | Sonny |
| 2024 | G! LU | Brian |
| 2024 | Abner | Abner |
| 2024 | As The Call, So The Echo | Lito |
| 2025 | Bar Boys: After School | Atty. Chris Carlson |

=== Television series ===
| Year | Title | Role |
|---|---|---|
| 2010 | Gumapang Ka sa Lusak | Elmer |
| 2010 | Kaya ng Powers | Noy Aquino |
| 2010 | Love Bug | Emil |
| 2010 | Jillian: Namamasko Po | Ace |
| 2011 | Time of My Life | Donnie |
| 2011 | Spooky Nights | Joey |
| 2013 | Kakambal ni Eliana | Julian de Vera |
| 2013 | Dormitoryo | Barney "Burn" Chavez |
| 2014–2015 | More Than Words | Nathaniel "Nate" Alvarez |
| 2015 | Because of You | Sonny Lacson |
| 2016–2017 | Till I Met You | Stephen |
| 2018 | Bagani | Datu |
| 2017–2018 | Pusong Ligaw | Rafa |
| 2019 | Hush | Sir Paul |
| 2019 | Nang Ngumiti ang Langit | James Villaluna |
| 2021 | FPJ's Ang Probinsyano | PCaptain Alvin Cuevas |
| 2022 | The Iron Heart | Hero Sequestro |
| 2023 | Can't Buy Me Love | Edward Liao |
| 2025–2026 | Roja | Marco Murillo |

== Personal life ==
Enzo's father, former partylist representative Eric Pineda, was a former business manager of Manny Pacquiao.

In 2021, he became a Marine reservist after completing the basic citizen military course under the Philippine Navy with the rank of staff sergeant.

In October 2024, Pineda filed his candidacy for councilor in the fifth district of Quezon City in the 2025 elections.

In October 2026, Pineda got engaged with actress Michelle Vito.

== Awards and nominations ==
Enzo Pineda won the Best Actor Award at the Emirates Film Festival 2025, 11th Edition, held in Dubai, United Arab Emirates, on January 18, 2025. He won the award for his performance in the film "As The Call So The Echo", a short film written and directed by Rusty Palacio Guarin. The film was produced by Aquino Plotado under his production company, Aquino Plotado Film International, based in the United Arab Emirates.

| Year | Award | Category | Nominated work | Result | Ref. |
|---|---|---|---|---|---|
| 2021 | FAMAS Awards | He Who Is Without Sin | Best Supporting Actor | Won | |
| 2025 | Emirates Film Festival | As The Call So The Echo | Best Actor | Won | |
