= Adrian Alandy =

Filipino actor and model

- Born: Adrian Louis Castro Alandy; Manila, Philippines
- Other names: Adrian, Luis, David, Carlos
- Occupations: Actor; model
- Years active: 1998–present
- Height: 5 ft 8 in (1.73 m)
- Spouse: Joselle Fernandez (m. 2017)

Adrian Louis Castro Alandy, also known as Luis Alandy and Adrian Alandy, is a Filipino actor and model. His first acting role was as David in the TV series Pangako Sa 'Yo. He has since appeared in soap operas, as well as in theater, appearing in the stage musical All About Men, in which he was naked on stage. After this he began showing more skin in his work, as well as playing gay roles on screen. He has also starred in a number of hit movies like Pacquiao: The Movie, Citizen Jake and Alone/Together. He constantly alternates between working with ABS-CBN and GMA.

== Early life ==
Alandy was brought up as a Methodist growing up in Antipolo alongside his three brothers and one sister. Growing up, he wanted to be a basketball player or a chef. He studied at San Sebastian College, but never got to finish his studies due to his acting career.

== Career ==
=== Start with GMA Network ===
Alandy started out as a GMA Network artist in 1997 after going to an audition with his cousin. He first used the name Luis Alandy, the name of his grandfather. As one of GMA's first contract artists, he had roles in Di Ba't Ikaw, Bubble Gang, and others. One of his first roles was supposed to be the series Click. However, a misunderstanding with GMA caused him to transfer to ABS-CBN. In between transferring networks, he focused on his studies as a junior BSBA Management student at AMA Computer University-East Rizal and lived for six months in California.

=== First stint with ABS-CBN ===
In 2001, Alandy transferred to ABS-CBN. One of his first projects was a significant role next to Judy Ann Santos in the film Luv Text, also his first film role. He also attended acting workshops held by the network. He made his ABS-CBN primetime television drama debut on Pangako Sa 'Yo in the role of David San Luis, the childhood best friend of the female lead Yna Macaspac (Kristine Hermosa). This was followed by his role as a suitor in Sa Dulo ng Walang Hanggan. He then starred in another film alongside Judy Ann Santos in May Pag-Ibig Pa Kaya? In 2003, he reunited with Hermosa in the romance series Sana’y Wala Nang Wakas.

With ABS-CBN, Alandy shed his wholesome image. In 2004, he modeled boxer shorts for Bench. He then joined the musical revue Penis Talks, in which he wore only his underwear. In 2006, he played the antagonist/anti-hero Diego in Gulong ng Palad, the remake of the 1949 hit radio drama and 1977 telenovela. He also joined the all-male macho group Barako Boys, alongside Jay Manalo and Christian Vasquez, which has released an album.

=== 2010s ===
Alandy subsequently returned from ABS-CBN to GMA Network, appearing in two primetime shows, Dyesebel and Luna Mystika. He then starred in the action thriller Sine Novela: Ngayon at Kailanman, playing a villain. In 2011, he was the leading man on My Lover, My Wife. Later on, he starred in Innamorata as a blind man who fell in love with the main character. In 2015, Alandy played David Limjoco in the lesbian TV series The Rich Man's Daughter.

In 2016, Alandy moved back to ABS-CBN. He portrayed the character of Chad Cruz in the daytime series The Greatest Love. In 2017 he changed his on-screen name from Luis Alandy to Adrian Alandy, his birth name, to avoid confusion with his cousin, Cavite Rep. Luis "Jonjon" Alandy Ferrer IV, and to show appreciation for his parents. In 2018, he made a special appearance on Asintado.

Alandy then returned to GMA Network in a leading man role in Onanay. In 2018, he starred in the film Citizen Jake. Later that year, he returned to ABS-CBN in the lead role of 'Carlos' in the afternoon series Kadenang Ginto, alongside Dimples Romana, Beauty Gonzales, and Albert Martinez. Kadenang Ginto was a ratings hit, leading the ratings for the afternoon block. He also played Liza Soberano's boss and boyfriend in Alone/Together.

=== 2020–present ===
In 2021, Alandy starred in an episode of MMK alongside Angel Aquino.

After three years, Alandy returned to GMA with a role in the second season of the anthology series I Can See You. He then had roles in Stories from the Heart: Loving Miss Bridgette and Widows' Web. In 2023, he played the main antagonist role of 'Magnus Illusorio' the corrupt politician and greedy man in the afternoon series Magandang Dilag, alongside Herlene Budol, Benjamin Alves, Rob Gomez, and Maxine Medina. In 2026, he appeared in the romantic drama film The Loved One.

== Personal life ==
Alandy married Joselle Fernandez on February 17, 2017, in Tagaytay. He was 37 years old and she was 23 years old when they got married. He had previously been in relationships with Tin Arnaldo and Desiree del Valle.

Alandy is a distant relative of actor Romeo Vasquez.

Alandy learned how to ride a motorbike around age 40. It has since become his hobby to go on motorbike rides.

== Filmography ==
=== Film ===
Key
†	Denotes films that have not yet been released

Adrian Alandy's film credits with year of release, film titles and roles
Year	Title	Role	Ref.
2001	Mila	Ruel	
2001	Luv Text	Young Nanding	
2002	May Pag-Ibig Pa Kaya?	Albero	
2003	Keka	Jessie Sta. Ana	
2004	Bcuz of U		
2005	Tuli		
2006	Barcelona		
2006	Pacquiao: The Movie		
2006	Manay Po	Adrian Pengson	
2006	Lambanog	Mark	
2006	Karma		
2007	Desperadas	Mandy	
2007	Resiklo	The Motanos	
2007	Signos	Louie	
2008	Shake, Rattle & Roll X	Dario	
2010	Dagaw	Various	
2010	Buenavista (Ang Kasaysayan ng Lucena)	Horacio Zaldena	
2011	Babang Luksa	Carlos	
2015	Anino sa Likod ng Buwan	Joel	
2016	Imagine You and Me	Arnold Malinao	
2016	Die Beautiful	Jesse	
2016	Kabisera		
2016	Siphayo	Conrado	
2016	Kusina	Alejandro	
2017	Tatlong Bibe	Art	
2018	Citizen Jake	Jonie	
2018	Class of 2018	Sir Patrick	
2018	Never Not Love You	Jason	
2019	Alone/Together	Gregory "Greg" Fausto	
2025	Ang Happy Homes ni Diane Hilario	Chris	
2026	The Loved One	Greg	

=== Television ===
Key
†	Denotes shows that have not yet been aired

Adrian Alandy's television credits with year of release, title(s) and role
Year	Title	Role	Ref.
1999–2003	ASAP	Himself / Performer	
2000–2001	Pangako Sa 'Yo	David San Luis	
2001–2003	Sa Dulo ng Walang Hanggan	Clarence Cristobal	
2003–2004	Sana'y Wala Nang Wakas	Ramon Madrigal	
2005–2006	Vietnam Rose	Carina's father	
2006	Gulong ng Palad	Diego Morales	
2007	Fantastic Man	Draxor	
2007	Impostora	Leandro Meneses	
2007	Maynila	Various	
2007–2008	La Vendetta	Ariel Guevarra	
2008	Dyesebel	Gildo Villarama	
2008–2009	Luna Mystika	Andoy	
2009	Sine Novela: Ngayon at Kailanman	Ronald Noche	
2010	Sine Novela: Ina, Kasusuklaman Ba Kita?	Brent Carlos	
2010	Claudine: Doble Cara	Cara's Fiancé	
2010–2011	Beauty Queen	Dante Pineda	
2011	My Lover, My Wife	Lawrence Delgado	
2011	Iglot	Juancho Rivera	
2012	Broken Vow	Felix Rastro	
2012	Luna Blanca	Teddy	
2012–2013	Yesterday's Bride	Celso Agustin	
2013	Indio	Hangaway	
2013	Magpakailanman: Naubos na Yaman	Dioni Reyes	
2013	Binoy Henyo	Francis Sandoval	
2014	Innamorata	Edwin Manansala / Arnaldo Manansala	
2015	Second Chances	Albert Bermudez	
2015	Eat Bulaga Lenten Special: Pangako ng Pagi-ibig	Julius	
2015	The Rich Man's Daughter	David Limjoco	
2015	My Fair Lady	Benjie	
2016	Eat Bulaga Lenten Special: Panata	John	
2016	Karelasyon: Wanted Tatay	Emir	
2016–2017	The Greatest Love	Chad Cruz	
2018	Onanay	Elvin Montenegro	
2018	Asintado	Robert Ramirez	
2018–2020	Kadenang Ginto	Carlos Bartolome	
2018–2020	ASAP Natin 'To	Himself / Performer	
2021	Maalaala Mo Kaya: Singsing	Janwell Pacio	
2021	I Can See You: The Lookout	Jason "Lakay" Bautista	
2021	Stories from the Heart: Loving Miss Bridgette	Luther Tamayo	
2022	Widows' Web	Vladimir Sagrado	
2022	Magpakailanman: The Mother Who Left: The Fralei Gabor Story	Harold	
2023	Magandang Dilag	Magnus Illusorio	
2024	Magpakailanman: Always in My Mind: The Kath Basa Story	Daniel	
2025	Incognito	Jake Dela Cuesta	
2025	Prinsesa ng City Jail	Adrian	
2025	Love at First Spike	Ato Santillan	
2025	Tropang G.O.A.T.	Mang Obet	
2025–present	ASAP XP	Himself / Performer	
2026	House of Lies	Randall Duque	
2026	My Bespren Emman	Jeremiah	

== Awards and nominations ==
Year	Work	Award	Category	Result	Ref.
2019	Citizen Jake	Best Supporting Actor	The EDDYs	Nominated	
