= Dolphy Alay Tawa: A Musical Tribute to the King of Philippine Comedy =

- Directed by: Al Quinn
- Starring: various artists
- Country of origin: Philippines
- Original languages: Filipino; English

Production
- Production locations: Mall of Asia Arena, Pasay, Metro Manila
- Camera setup: Multiple-camera setup
- Running time: 150 minutes

Original release
- Network: ABS-CBN; GMA Network; TV5
- Release: September 30, 2012

Dolphy Alay Tawa: A Musical Tribute to the King of Philippine Comedy is a 2012 Philippine concert paying tribute to comedian and actor, Dolphy, named as the Philippines' king of comedy, who died on July 10, 2012, due to multiple organ failure. The concert was held at the Mall of Asia Arena in Pasay on September 19, 2012, and was simultaneously aired as a television special on September 30, 2012, by the three major Philippine commercial television networks: ABS-CBN, GMA Network and TV5.

== Production ==
The concert was held at the Mall of Asia Arena, an indoor arena within the SM Mall of Asia complex in Pasay, Metro Manila. During the show, it was explained that the reason why the Quizon family chose the arena as the concert's venue is because the arena's land used to be near a river where a then-teenage Dolphy learned how to swim.

The musical tribute was directed by Al Quinn and written by Bibeth Orteza and featured talents from ABS-CBN, TV5 and GMA Network. The proceeds of the concert went to the Eye Bank Foundation of the Philippines, Friends of Hope, and the Philippine Red Cross.

== Line-up ==
Featured performances and appearances included:

- Dolphy's grandchildren Rowell and John Quizon performing during the front act, impersonating the voices and mannerisms of Filipino artists such as Jaya, Ogie Alcasid, Janno Gibbs, Nora Aunor, Fernando Poe, Jr., and their grandfather Dolphy.
- News anchors Bernadette Sembrano of ABS-CBN News, Paolo Bediones of News5, and Rhea Santos of GMA News discussing what the special is all about, joking about moving stations, and explaining why the Quizon family chose the Mall of Asia Arena to be the tribute event's venue.
- Dolphy's children Sahlee and Eric Quizon, as representatives of their father's foundation, the Dolphy Aid Para sa Pinoy Foundation, talking about the beneficiaries where the proceeds for the event will go.
- Gary Valenciano, Martin Nievera, Janno Gibbs, Ogie Alcasid, and Sharon Cuneta performing "Buhay Artista", the theme song of the 1964 show of the same name where Dolphy starred in.
- Heart Evangelista, Lorna Tolentino, and Boy Abunda introducing video clips from Dolphy's filmography that showed the comedian's use of comic timing.
- Siblings Ruffa and Raymond Gutierrez introducing Dolphy's famous "invisible dog" joke performed by comedians Jose Manalo and Wally Bayola through a recorded video clip.
- Lovi Poe and Paolo Bediones introducing a clip from GMA Network's Bubble Gang where Boy Pick-Up (played by Ogie Alcasid) engages a pick-up line battle with Big Boy Puruntong (played by Dolphy).
- Edu Manzano introducing a drag queen production number by Michael V., Wendell Ramos, Keempee de Leon, Martin Escudero, Smokey Manaloto, and Gio Alvarez accompanied by Aljur Abrenica, Daniel Matsunaga, and Rayver Cruz.
- Judy Ann Santos and husband, Ryan Agoncillo introducing Dolphy and Panchito's "Translation Department" skit performed by Dolphy's children Epy and Vandolph.
- Marian Rivera and Dennis Trillo introducing a "Swan Lake" dance number performed by Iya Villania, Jhong Hilario, Melai Cantiveros, Ruby Rodriguez, and Ai-Ai delas Alas.
- Veteran stars Susan Roces, Eddie Garcia, Daisy Romualdez, German Moreno, Rosa Rosal, Nova Villa, and Eddie Gutierrez sharing their fondest memories with Dolphy.
- Maricel Soriano introducing a dance number and skits from John en Marsha and Home Along Da Riles performed by the cast of ABS-CBN's Goin' Bulilit.
- Kathryn Bernardo, Daniel Padilla, Barbie Forteza, Joshua Dionisio, Ritz Azul, Aljur Abrenica, Kris Bernal, Eula Caballero, Maja Salvador, and Piolo Pascual sharing what they want to emulate from Dolphy.
- Sisters Toni and Alex Gonzaga introducing Dolphy's children Eric, Ronnie, Epy, and Vandolph, and grandchild Boy2 Quizon, performing a medley of songs from the 60s to the 90s.
- Eric Quizon introducing a video performance of "Smile" by half-sister Zia Quizon, along with an old clip of Dolphy singing the same song.
- Carla Abellana and Glaiza de Castro introducing a dance tribute by Mark Herras and Gab Valenciano, along with Bayani Casimiro, Dolphy's former dance partner.
- Billy Crawford and Derek Ramsay introducing Nikki Gil, Angeline Quinto, Jolina Magdangal, Rachelle Ann Go, Danita Paner, and Arci Muñoz performing some of Dolphy's favorite songs from the 60s and 70s.
- Eugene Domingo doing a monologue skit, joking about having an affair with Dolphy.
- Roderick Paulate introducing a tap dancing number by Vhong Navarro, Shaina Magdayao, Pauleen Luna, J.C. de Vera, Edgar Allan Guzman, Rocco Nacino, Eula Caballero, Enzo Pineda, Wynwyn Marquez, and tap dancing duo HappyFeet.
- Dolphy's "heir apparent" Vic Sotto performing "Send In the Clowns" through video.
- Actress and then-Governor of Batangas Vilma Santos speaking through video while showing pictures of her and Dolphy in films together.
- Nora Aunor reciting lines from the song "Handog".
- The Quizon siblings, along with Dolphy's grandchild Boy2 Quizon, performing "We Are Family." They were later joined by Zsa Zsa Padilla and daughter Karylle, who thanked the audience for coming and introduced a video of Dolphy being given a rap tribute by Gloc-9.
- All of the celebrities performing "What a Wonderful World", Dolphy's favorite song. (Note: This includes Joey de Leon, Tito Sotto, Jimmy Santos, Kempee de Leon, and Amy Perez)

At the duration of the show, the respective chairmen of GMA Network, ABS-CBN, and TV5 at the time: Felipe Gozon, Eugenio Lopez III, and Manuel V. Pangilinan, made video messages speaking about the comedian.

== Broadcast ==
The tribute concert aired on September 30, 2012, at exactly 10:30 PM PHT. In a rare opportunity, the show was simultaneously aired by ABS-CBN, GMA Network and TV5. As a compromise, the networks designated the Quezon Memorial Circle in Quezon City as the common playback point of the special. From the Quezon Memorial Circle, the networks will pick up the common feed by each of their outside broadcast vans (OB van) en route to their individual broadcast facilities.
