= List of Love & Lies episodes =

Love & Lies, a Filipino suspense-action drama television series created by RJ Nuevas, developed by Richard Cruz and produced and broadcast by GMA Network. The series premiered on April 8, 2013 on the network's GMA Telebabad slot and on April 9, 2013 worldwide via GMA Pinoy TV. The concluded its nine weeks run on June 7, 2013 with the total of forty-four episodes.

The forty-five-minute scripted drama follows the life and love Edward Galvez, a fictional Philippine Navy officer, who gets tangled in a web of lies and conspiracies when a mysterious organization suddenly kidnaps his wife. As the protagonist discovers the truth behind the crime, he uncovers a treacherous plot that threatens to turn his world upside-down. The true perpetrators of the crime may be closer to home than he dare think. As he thread to the maze of lies, blackmails, double-dealings, and betrayals, everyone becomes a suspect.

Mark Reyes directed the show, while Leilani Feliciano-Sandoval and Rebya Upalda were the executive producers of the series throughout its nine weeks run, 44 episodes.

== Main cast ==
- Richard Gutierrez as Edward Galvez
- Bela Padilla as Denise Salvador
- Michelle Madrigal as Catherine "Cathy" Galvez
- Sid Lucero as Gabriel "Gabby" Romero
- Paolo Contis as Emmanuel "Manny" Perez

== List of episodes ==
No.	Title	Original release date
1	"The Abduction"	April 8, 2013
2	"The Abduction"	April 9, 2013
3	"The Abduction"	April 10, 2013
4	"The Abduction"	April 11, 2013
5	"The Abduction"	April 12, 2013
Edward Galvez—an outstanding Navy officer—is contemplating on leaving the service and start a simple yet peaceful life with his family. But his world turned upside down when his wife, Cathy gets kidnapped by an unknown group. In his quest to save his beloved wife, Edward crosses paths with Denise Salvador, the sister of Ricardo Salvador (Neil Ryan Sese), the suspect for the kidnapping. Denise is also looking for her brother.
6	"Dead End"	April 15, 2013
7	"Dead End"	April 16, 2013
8	"Dead End"	April 17, 2013
9	"Dead End"	April 18, 2013
10	"Dead End"	April 19, 2013
Edward suspects Ricardo Salvador as the mastermind of the kidnapping because he believes he carries a vendetta. Desperate to save his wife, Edward decides to take matters in his own hands. Together with Denise, they will try to look for Ricardo. However, when they finally get a lead where he is, they find him dead. Although devastated, Edward becomes more determined in searching for Cathy, while Denise, on the other hand, vows to find out who killed her brother.
11	"Set Up"	April 22, 2013
12	"Set Up"	April 23, 2013
13	"Set Up"	April 24, 2013
14	"Set Up"	April 25, 2013
15	"Set Up"	April 26, 2013
In an unexpected turn of events, Edward finds himself in a sticky situation as he is now become the main suspect in his wife's disappearance. Meanwhile, Cathy's parents, upon learning the news, immediately order Edward's arrest. The latter denies the allegation and determined to prove that he has nothing to do with the kidnapping. Denise, on the other hand, discovers some possible evidences from Ricardo's stuff; began suspecting that her brother might have been involved in Cathy's kidnapping case.
16	"Captured"	April 29, 2013
17	"Captured"	April 30, 2013
18	"Captured"	May 1, 2013
19	"Captured"	May 2, 2013
20	"Captured"	May 3, 2013
In these episodes, NBI captures Edward just as he is trying to escape. But he eventually manages to convince them of his innocence—thanks for the help of his best friend Gabby Romero. As Edward continues his quest to save his wife, new discoveries and unexpected turns happen.
21	"Explosion"	May 6, 2013
22	"Explosion"	May 7, 2013
23	"Explosion"	May 8, 2013
24	"Explosion"	May 9, 2013
25	"Explosion"	May 10, 2013
Edward will witness a big explosion and when the flame subsides, he will be shocked to find amid the debris the lifeless, totally charred body of someone he knows. Cathy's parents blamed Edward for what had happened to their daughter. They suspect that Edward is the mastermind behind Cathy's kidnapping and murder, and that he was after the ransom money. Edward denied having to do with Cathy's kidnapping and death. He refuses to accept that Cathy is already dead—he wants to believe that the charred remains found in the burning shanty aren't his wife's. Edward lost all hope when the police officers found amid the debris a wedding ring, which Edward positively identified as his wife's. Edward insisted on doing a DNA test on the remains. He wants to be absolutely sure whether it's Cathy's or not. Cathy's parents agreed on one condition: that if the cadaver is identified to be Cathy's, it should be given a proper burial immediately. During the burial, a grenade will be hurled at Edward. A pandemonium will ensue. Meanwhile, Denise saves someone dear to her from danger. Realizing that the NBI are running after them, they will hide inside the house of a friend. Here, Denise will learn about what happened to Edward and what he had found.
26	"Uncover"	May 14, 2013
27	"Uncover"	May 15, 2013
28	"Uncover"	May 16, 2013
29	"Uncover"	May 17, 2013
Edward finally discovers that his own best friend Gabby is the real mastermind of all the things that is happening to him. Meanwhile, a surprising ally in the form of NBI Agent Manny Perez joins Gabby as they continue to torment Edward. The latter on the other hand, receives a life-changing news—his beloved wife Cathy is alive!
30	"Deception"	May 20, 2013
31	"Deception"	May 21, 2013
32	"Deception"	May 22, 2013
33	"Deception"	May 23, 2013
34	"Deception"	May 24, 2013
Cathy is revealed to be romantically involved with Gabby, and the baby she's carrying is actually Gabby's child and not Edward's. It was also revealed that Cathy's "abduction" was just an orchestrated crime plotted by both Gabby and Cathy, herself. Meanwhile, Denise begins to have feelings for Edward—one thing that she doesn't want to go any further.
35	"Unmasked"	May 27, 2013
36	"Unmasked"	May 28, 2013
37	"Unmasked"	May 29, 2013
38	"Unmasked"	May 30, 2013
39	"Unmasked"	May 31, 2013
Edward discovers that his wife Cathy is cheating on him with his best friend-turned-foe Gabby. Devastated by the thought of being betrayed by the woman he loves the most, Edward tells Cathy he wants an annulment. Cathy asks for forgiveness and another chance. She also decides to end her affair with Gabby. But Gabby would not let her go that easily.
40	"Rage"	June 3, 2013
41	"Rage"	June 4, 2013
42	"Rage"	June 5, 2013
43	"Rage"	June 6, 2013
44	"Rage"	June 7, 2013
Gabby launches the next phase of his plans: he kidnapped Lola Rosa (Luz Valdez) and uses her as leverage to capture Edward. Cathy enters to save her husband; however, Gabby discovers their escape attempt. During the fight, Gabby unintentionally shot Cathy in the stomach, which eventually led to her death. Gabby manages to escape but captured by the NBI in the process – thanks to Manny Perez. Edward struggles with the aftermath of Cathy’s death. Denise, on the other hand, decides to go to the province to start anew... and to forget Edward. A year later. With the help of his henchmen, Gabby was able to escape from prison. He kidnapped Denise and locks her up in a boat with a bomb. Edward enters to rescue Denise. Gabby attacks Edward and a major fight between them happen. Edward kicks Gabby off in a room with a bomb and explodes! Edward manages to save Denise. In that very moment Edward realizes that he is also in love with Denise and he doesn't want to lose her.
