= Annabelle Rama =

Filipino talent manager and actress (born 1952)

- Born: Annabelle Rama y Rosal; October 31, 1952 (age 73); Cebu City, Philippines
- Occupation: Actress
- Years active: 1960–present
- Political party: UNA (2013)
- Spouse: Eddie Gutierrez (m. 1980)
- Children: 6; including Ruffa, Richard, Raymond
- Relatives: Vicente Rama (grandfather); Michael Rama (cousin)
- Family: Gutierrez family Rama family

Annabelle Rama de Gutiérrez (born October 31, 1952), commonly known as Annabelle Rama, is a Filipino actress. She is a native of Cebu and the wife of the 1960s Philippine cinema matinee idol, Eddie Gutierrez. She co-starred in My Monster Mom with her daughter.

== Early life ==
Annabelle Rama was born on October 31, 1952 to Laurente Rama and Feliciana Rosal. Her Spanish-Filipino father was a ship captain, while she never met her Chinese-Filipino biological mother due to family complications. After the death of her stepmother, Annabelle moved to her half-sister's residence in Barangay Zapatera, Cebu City where she stayed during her teenage years.

She is a granddaughter of former senator Vicente Rama, who was recognized as the Father of Cebu City.

== Personal life ==
Annabelle Rama married actor Eddie Gutierrez on November 8, 1980, in Los Angeles. She first met Gutiérrez as a fan when the latter was only 24 years old during an event in Cebu. The two later met again in Manila, where Rama became an actress in her own right. They have six children including Ruffa and Richard Gutierrez who are actors, and Raymond Gutierrez who is a TV host. She is also a stepmother to Tonton Gutierrez and Ramon Christopher Gutierrez, her husband's two sons from previous relationships.

Due to her birthday falling a day before All Saints Day, Rama customarily celebrates her birthday in advance.

== Political career ==
In 2013, Rama attempted to enter politics. She made a bid to become Cebu City's 1st District representative in the House of Representatives elections under the United Nationalist Alliance party. She lost her congressional bid to Raul del Mar.

== Filmography ==
- Umaapoy na Bakal (1962)
- Adiong Sikat ng Tondo (1962)
- Lover for Hire (1970)
- Uhaw (1970)
- Hayok (1970)
- Hidhid (1971)
- Ibigay Mo Sa Akin ang Langit (1975)
- Ako ang Nagbayo, Nagsaing, Iba ang Kumain (1975)
- My Monster Mom (2008)
- The Mall, the Merrier! (2019)
