= Binibining Pilipinas 1993 =

30th Binibining Pilipinas pageant

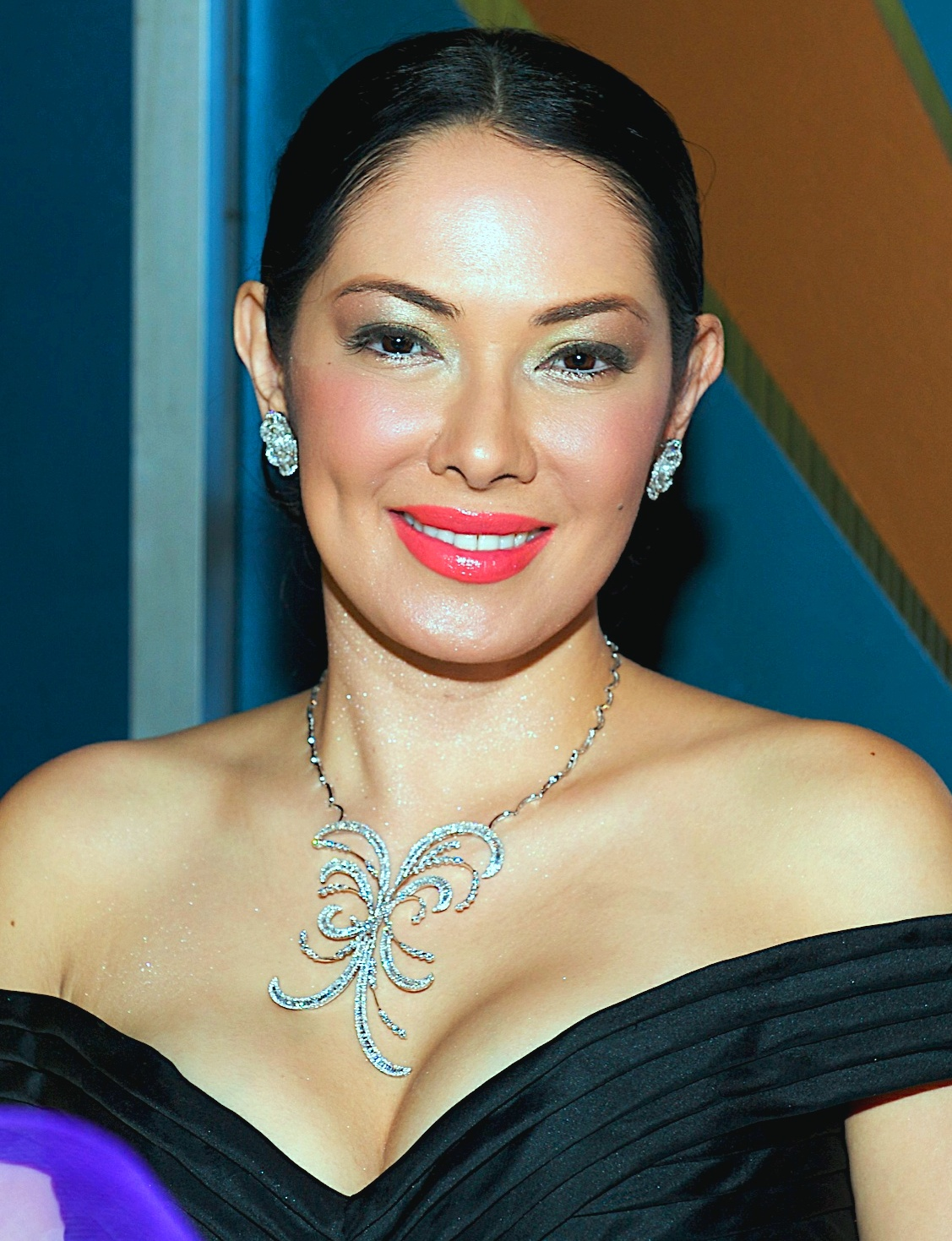
- Ruffa Gutierrez, Binibining Pilipinas-World 1993
- Date: March 21, 1993
- Presenters: Apa Ongpin; Alice Dixson
- Venue: Araneta Coliseum, Quezon City, Philippines
- Broadcaster: GMA Network
- Entrants: 39
- Placements: 15
- Winner: Dindi Gallardo
- Congeniality: Maricel Zafra
- Photogenic: Ana Maria Gonzalez

Binibining Pilipinas 1993 was the 30th edition of Binibining Pilipinas. It took place at the Araneta Coliseum in Quezon City, Metro Manila, Philippines on March 21, 1993.

At the end of the event, Elizabeth Berroya crowned Dindi Gallardo as Binibining Pilipinas Universe 1993, Marilen Espino crowned Ruffa Gutierrez as Binibining Pilipinas World 1993, while Joanne Alivio crowned Sheela Mae Santarin as Binibining Pilipinas International 1993.

The pageant also awarded two special titles in the earlier part of the pageant. Ruffa Gutierrez, 1992 Look of the Year Philippines, crowned Ana Maria Gonzalez as Binibining Pilipinas Look of the Year 1993, while Milagros Javelosa, Binibining Pilipinas Tourism 1990, crowned Jenette Fernando as Binibining Pilipinas Tourism 1993. Cristina Esguerra was named 1st runner-up and Myra Macariola was named 2nd runner-up.

== Results ==
=== Placements ===
Color keys

- The contestant was a finalist/runner-up in an international pageant.
- The contestant did not place.

Placement	Contestant	International placement
Binibining Pilipinas Universe 1993	Bb. #38 – Melinda Joanna Gallardo	Unplaced – Miss Universe 1993
Binibining Pilipinas World 1993	Bb. #39 – Sharmaine Gutierrez	2nd Runner-Up – Miss World 1993
Binibining Pilipinas International 1993	Bb. #1 – Sheela Mae Santarin	Unplaced – Miss International 1993
Binibining Pilipinas Look of the Year 1993	Bb. #33 – Ana Maria Gonzalez	Unplaced – Elite Model Look of the Year 1993
Binibining Pilipinas Tourism 1993	Bb. #22 – Jenette Fernando	
1st runner-up	Bb. #21 – Cristina Esguerra	
2nd runner-up	Bb. #3 – Myra Macariola	
Top 15	Bb. #6 – Maria Christina Macatangay; Bb. #8 – Sharon Sangalang; Bb. #9 – Marjorie Alejandro; Bb. #20 – Sandralli Lindain; Bb. #23 – Anabella Calupitan; Bb. #24 – Lani Marie Tagle; Bb. #25 – Maria Lorena Andan; Bb. #35 – Mitzi Tan; Bb. #36 – Karen Espino; Bb. #37 – Gina Llanos	

== Contestants ==
Thirty-nine contestants competed for the five titles.

No.	Contestant	Age (Note: Ages at the time of the pageant)
1	Sheela Mae Santarin	18
2	Farah Tagle	22
3	Myra Macariola	23
4	Ederlinda Lapuz	22
5	Joy Sacdalan	23
6	Maria Christina Macatangay	22
7	Daisy Farolan	23
8	Sharon Sangalang	17
9	Marjorie Alejandro	18
10	Maricar David	20
11	Brenda Raquel	20
13	Carlizette Dimaandal	21
14	Maritess Pacanza	17
15	Araceli Elaine Macomb	20
16	Marieta de Ocampo	17
17	Angelica Pineda	17
18	Maria Hazel Velez	19
19	Zara Jane Juan	22
20	Sandralli Lindain	23
21	Christina Esguerra	19
22	Jenette Fernando	22
23	Anabella Calupitan	20
24	Lani Marie Tagle	20
25	Maria Lorena Andan	19
26	Marie Elizabeth Rodriguez	21
27	Michelle Velarde	17
28	Maricel Zafra	23
29	Adele Apaya	22
30	Ana Rachel Rodriguez	23
31	Joriza Hernandez	20
32	Hedda Advincula	20
33	Ana Maria Gonzalez	20
34	Vina Concepcion	18
35	Mitzi Tan	21
36	Karen Sanz Espino	17
37	Gina Llanos	20
38	Melinda Joanna Gallardo	21
39	Sharmaine Ruffa Gutierrez	18
