= H.O.T. TV: Hindi Ordinaryong Tsismis =

Philippine television talk show

- Title card
- Genre: Talk show
- Presented by: Regine Velasquez; Roderick Paulate; Raymond Gutierrez; Jennylyn Mercado
- Country of origin: Philippines
- Original language: Tagalog
- No. of episodes: 39

Production
- Camera setup: Multiple-camera setup
- Running time: 90 minutes
- Production company: GMA Entertainment TV

Original release
- Network: GMA Network
- Release: August 5, 2012 – April 28, 2013

H.O.T. TV: Hindi Ordinaryong Tsismis (transl. H.O.T. TV: not ordinary gossip) is a Philippine television magazine talk show broadcast by GMA Network. Directed by Rico Gutierrez, it was hosted by Regine Velasquez, Roderick Paulate, Raymond Gutierrez and Jennylyn Mercado. It premiered on August 5, 2012. The show concluded on April 28, 2013, with a total of 39 episodes.

== Ratings ==
Hosts

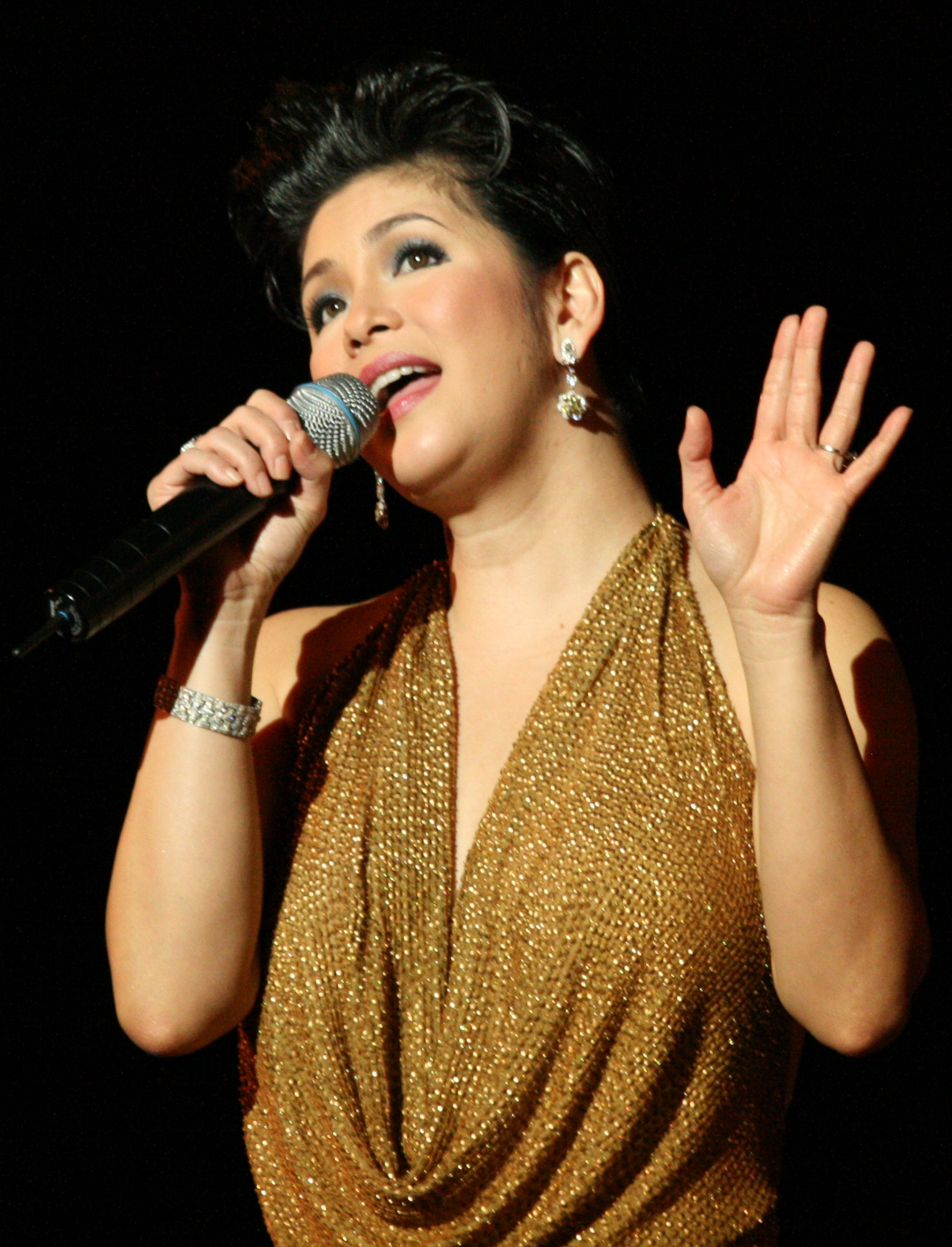
Regine Velasquez

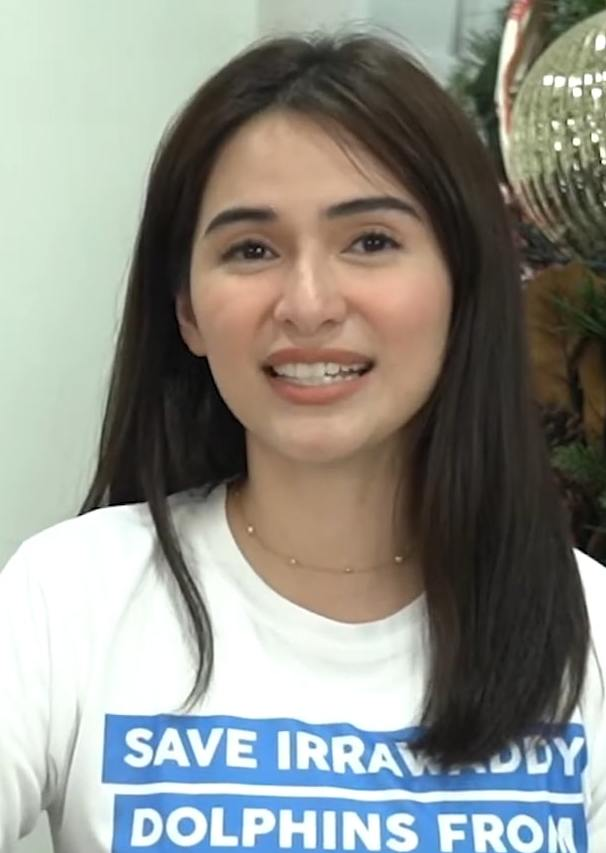
Jennylyn Mercado

According to AGB Nielsen Philippines' Mega Manila household television ratings, the pilot episode of H.O.T. TV: Hindi Ordinaryong Tsismis earned a 12.4% rating. The final episode scored a 6.8% rating.

== Accolades ==
Accolades received by H.O.T. TV: Hindi Ordinaryong Tsismis
Year	Award	Category	Recipient	Result	Ref.
2013	27th PMPC Star Awards for Television	Best Magazine Show Host	Regine Velasquez Raymond Gutierrez Jennylyn Mercado Roderick Paulate	Nominated	
