= My Monster Mom =

2008 Filipino comedy drama film

- Theatrical movie poster
- Directed by: Jose Javier Reyes
- Written by: Jose Javier Reyes
- Produced by: Jose Mari Abacan; Roselle Monteverde-Teo; Annette Gozon-Abrogar; Lily Y. Monteverde
- Starring: Ruffa Gutierrez; Annabelle Rama
- Cinematography: Rodolfo Aves Jr.
- Edited by: Ria de Guzman
- Music by: Jesse Lucas
- Production companies: Regal Films; GMA Pictures
- Release date: July 2, 2008
- Country: Philippines
- Languages: Filipino; English; Cebuano
- Budget: ₱10 million
- Box office: ₱96,562,123.00

My Monster Mom is a 2008 horror comedy-drama film produced and distributed by Regal Films and GMA Pictures. It stars Annabelle Rama as Esme, an abrasive, loudmouth mother, and Ruffa Gutierrez as Abbey, her American-spoken daughter from the United States. Together they go through a series of antics and mishaps that eventually shapes their relationship for the better.

== Plot ==
Esmeralda "Esme" Fajardo, a spirited and ultra-liberal teenager from Cebu, moves to Manila for college. She falls in love with Waldo, a charming gentleman who reciprocates her feelings. Their secret meetings lead to Esme becoming pregnant, causing her to stop her studies.

Forced to live with Waldo, Esme discovers he is cheating on her. After a violent confrontation, she leaves him and takes on various odd jobs to support herself.

After several months, Esme gives birth to her daughter, Abbey. Sadly, she decides to give Abbey to her relatives, who are migrating to the United States, hoping that Abbey will have a better life there.

Twenty-seven years later, Esme has become a wealthy jewelry trader. She is ecstatic to hear that her daughter Abbey, now a liberal New Yorker, is returning to the Philippines. Esme, who now has two sons, Boboy and Pipo from different fathers, welcomes Abbey into her real family.

Esme's confrontations with people around her, including her son's secret girlfriend and a rival neighbor, lead to humorous yet violent situations. These constant battles eventually tear her family apart. However, when Esme suffers a heart attack, her sons and daughter reunite with her and forgive her for all the trouble she has caused.

After several weeks in the hospital, Esme recovers but remains brash. She decides to meet her long-lost husband. Three months later, Abbey returns to the United States, only to be surprised by her mother, who follows her and plans to live with her in New York City.

== Cast ==
- Ruffa Gutierrez as Abbey Gail Fajardo
- Annabelle Rama as Adult Esmeralda Fajardo
- Rhian Ramos as Teenage Esmeralda Fajardo
- JC de Vera as Boboy
- Michelle Madrigal as Maureen
- Martin Escudero as Pipo
- Iwa Moto as Vivian
- Eugene Domingo as Marilou
- Richard Gutierrez as Teenage Waldo
- Eddie Gutierrez as Adult Waldo
- Khryss Adalia as Homer
- Chariz Solomon as Precy
- Bubbles Paraiso as Karen
- Vangie Labalan as Lumeng
- Tessie Villarama as Chuchay
