= Pinoy Adventures =

2012 Philippine television documentary show

- Title card
- Genre: Travel documentary
- Developed by: Marissa Flores; Neil Gumban
- Written by: Mike Rivera
- Directed by: Ivan Dedicatoria
- Presented by: Richard Gutierrez
- Country of origin: Philippines
- Original language: Tagalog
- No. of episodes: 21

Production
- Executive producer: Regina Estrada
- Camera setup: Multiple-camera setup
- Running time: 45 minutes
- Production company: GMA News and Public Affairs

Original release
- Network: GMA Network
- Release: May 13 – September 29, 2012

Pinoy Adventures (transl. Filipino Adventures) is a 2012 Philippine television travel documentary show broadcast by GMA Network. Hosted by Richard Gutierrez, it premiered on May 13, 2012. The show concluded on September 29, 2012, with a total of 21 episodes.

The show scours the country to feature some unknown paradise, forgotten relics and cultural treasures and lost traditions that rarely see on television.

Throughout its run, the host was accompanied by some local residents, historians, archaeologists and story tellers also served as tourist guides.

== Episodes ==
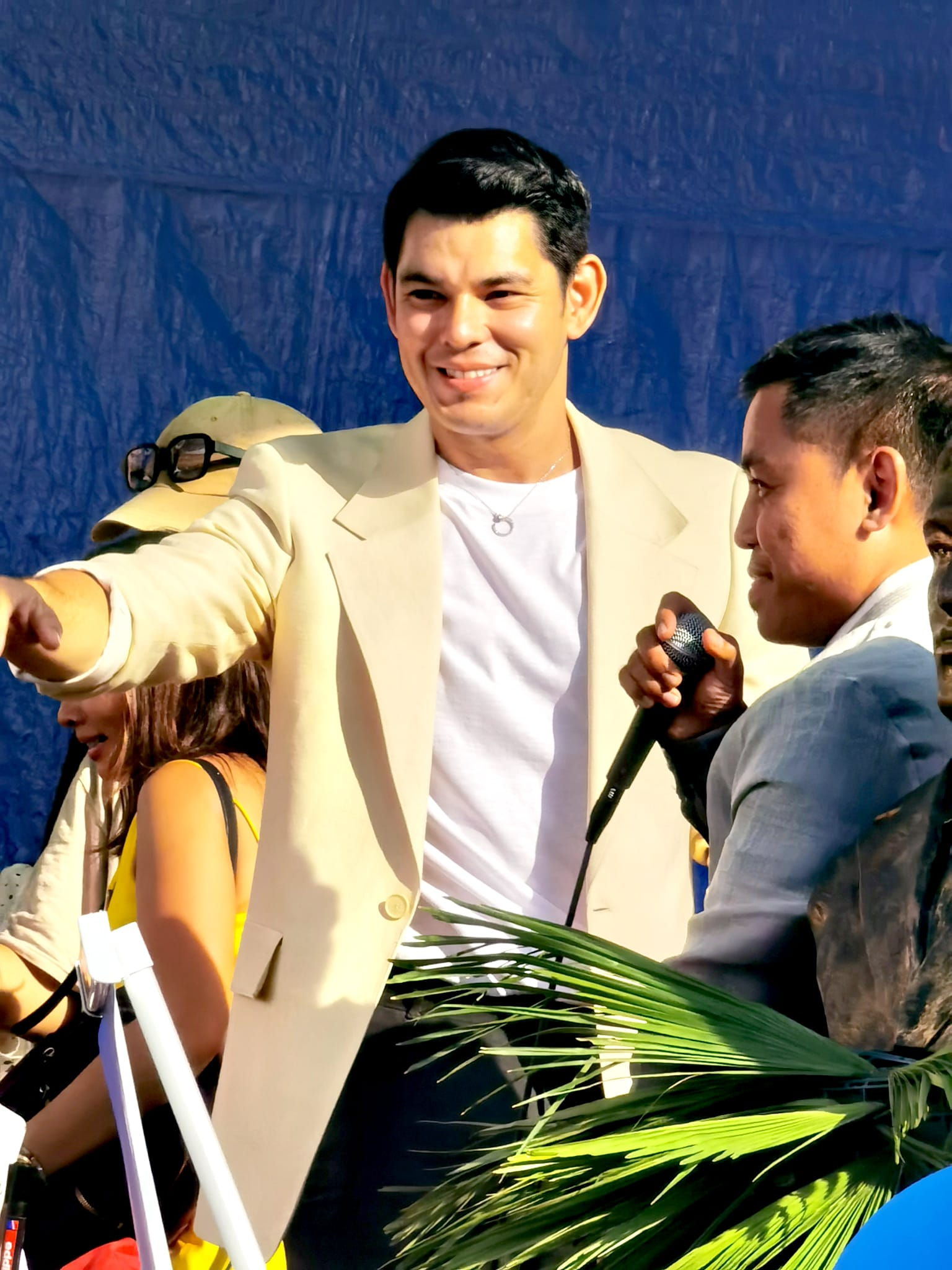
Richard Gutierrez served as a host.

=== Sibuyan Island, Romblon ===
Original air date: May 13, 2012, May 20, 2012 and May 27, 2012
In the premiere episode, the host and the rest of the team explore Sibuyan Island in Romblon. From Aklan to the destination, the team travels 4 hours by boat. The following day, the host explores Magdiwang's Sibuyan forest using mountain bike. On his way, he passes Mount Guiting-Guiting or G2. He also visits Lambingan Falls, a community-based eco-tourism. From Magdiwang, the host visits San Fernando's Ikaduha Fish Sanctuary where he tries snorkeling. The following morning, Gutierrez experienced Sayap or community net fishing, a tradition in San Fernando. After that, he visits Cantingas River.

=== Linapacan, Palawan ===
Original air date: June 3, 2012 and June 10, 2012
Linapacan (transl. footprints) is part of Calamianes Group of Island. It composed of 10 barangays. The host and the rest of the team visit first Ariara Island. On its second part, Gutierrez visits a century-old fortress called Sitio Caseledan, where he discovers a tribe called Tagbanuas which according to historical data, are already civilized even before the Spanish era. The team also explores Eli island and the Senyora cave, the most beautiful cave in Eli where they discovered the limestone formations inside.

=== Kalinga ===
Original air date: June 17, 2012 and June 24, 2012
The show features the ecotourism discovery destination of the north, Kalinga. On his accession to the mountainous Cordillera, the host will experienced a warm welcome from the locals. He visits a panciteria (noodle house) to eat "batil patung", the Tuguegarao version of stir fried noodles mixed with buffalo meat. But before he ate, he was invited by the owner to cook. After the food trip and while they were traveling, the ground suddenly crumbled and covered the road. Fortunately the team met Lakay Appad who offered them fresh pork as offering for Kabunian, the God recognized by the indigenous people. Later on, the team continued the journey. The whole team have witnessed natural beauty: green mountains in which the clouds almost kissed the land, and the rice terraces. Basically, the Kalinga mountains area is home of brave inhabitants. Gutierrez met the "headhunters", and another tribal group whose members have tattoo covered all over their bodies. The host also met the oldest tattoo artist, Wang-od, and its customers who are old ladies in the tribe.

=== Surigao del Norte ===
Original air date: July 1, 2012 and July 8, 2012
Beyond the sand, surf and sea, the host, Richard Gutierrez and the rest of the team discover a different kind of adventure in several islands of the province. His first stop, Hikdop Island. An hour away from the city center, the white sandy shores and limestone cliffs lead him, not to the depths of the sea, but to the bosoms of Buenavista Cave. Despite the threat of absolute darkness and venomous snakes, he spends hours hiking the cave with locals who know each step and rock that lead to the magnificent "King's Court" and "King's Throne" rock formations. In Basul island, his next stop is a camping ground. Gutierrez sets up his own tent, makes his own bed and enjoys the rare night-time solitude. The team also discovers a different adventure in the floating village of Day-asan where houses on stilts line waterlogged streets. Gutierrez tries to navigate "abandung", a small boat made with one whole block of solid hardwood. He caps the trip with a trip to the lobster farm where he gets a sumptuous taste of Surigaonon flavor. The host explores saltwater marine life and even pre-historic looking fishes in Lake Bababu. He also finds a halocline where inland fresh water merges with seawater

=== Cebu ===
Original air date: July 15, 2012 and July 22, 2012
Dubbed as "The Queen City of the South", the host, Richard Gutierrez revisited his hometown, Cebu. He takes us on an exploration of the less traveled adventure spots to rediscover the magnificent vistas of the province that he considers his home away from home. A warm welcome at the Rama Compound, the place where his mother's kin have lived for decades, starts off his search for adrenaline-pumping action. He shares a meal of "Bam-I", a type of pancit (noodles) dish that's considered the family heirloom recipe. He also gives a tour of the house as he relives his moments spent vacationing in Cebu. Energized with great memories, Gutierrez and the rest of the team hies off to their first adventure stop: Matutinao River in the town of Badian, a destination only three hours away from the city and frequented by extreme outdoor enthusiasts. He tries his hand at canyoneering, a sport that involves abseils (rappels) and ropework, technical climbing or down-climbing as well as jumps and swims along canyons and mountain gorges. The arduous physical challenge doesn't stop Richard from admiring the magnificent view and enjoying the company of the local canyoneering group. On the second part episode, the host meets up with the Bugoy Bikers, a group of biking environmentalists founded by Jens Funk, a German national who chose to make Cebu his home 8 years ago. The group endeavours to lessen air pollution by encouraging bike tours around the province, a cause close to Gutierrez's heart. They fuel up with a hearty meal at the start-off point of the tour, "Balay ni Bugoy" (Visayan for Bugoy's House), a bed and breakfast frequented by biking enthusiasts. The biking tour takes them mostly uphill along the roads of Barangay Gaas in the town of Balamban. The difficult yet scenic tour ends in Cantabaco, another adventure destination for locals and tourists who are into the extreme sport of rock climbing. After that, the whole team makes a quick detour, to give a taste of "danggit", sun-dried rabbit fish, and the famous "best roast pig in the world", according to world-renowned chef, Anthony Bourdain. After the food trip, Gutierrez, finds himself in the Cantabaco Rock Climbing Wall, a group of limestone rock formations discovered in 1983 by local mountaineers.

=== Bukidnon ===
Original air date: August 4, 2012
The host and guest, actress Sarah Lahbati start off by exploring the "Highland Paradise of Mindanao" with a popular mode of transportation in the province, horses! Then they try extreme sport together - the luge. They get to ride a small coasting sled along a steep and winding luge track. They also find themselves in dune buggy. The ride brings them to a high point with a panoramic view of the verdant mountains of Bukidnon. But as the adventure continues, they find out how they will survive when the buggy gets stuck. To cap their extreme Bukidnon adventure, Gutierrez and Lahbati, get tight as they ride the Anicycle, a bicycle ride 100-feet above the ground over a single tightrope.

=== Sarangani ===
Original air date: August 11, 2012 and August 18, 2012
Richard Gutierrez and the rest of the team invaded Sarangani province, accompanied by Sarangani Congressman Manny Pacquiao. In Barangay New La Union, Gutierrez and Pacquiao tried the whitewater river tubing adventure where they negotiated the 1.6-kilometer whitewater river tubing at Pangi River's rapids. On the second part of the series, Gutierrez tried another extreme adventure, night diving (again with Pacquiao) and paragliding which Gutierrez highly recommends for the extreme adventure seekers.

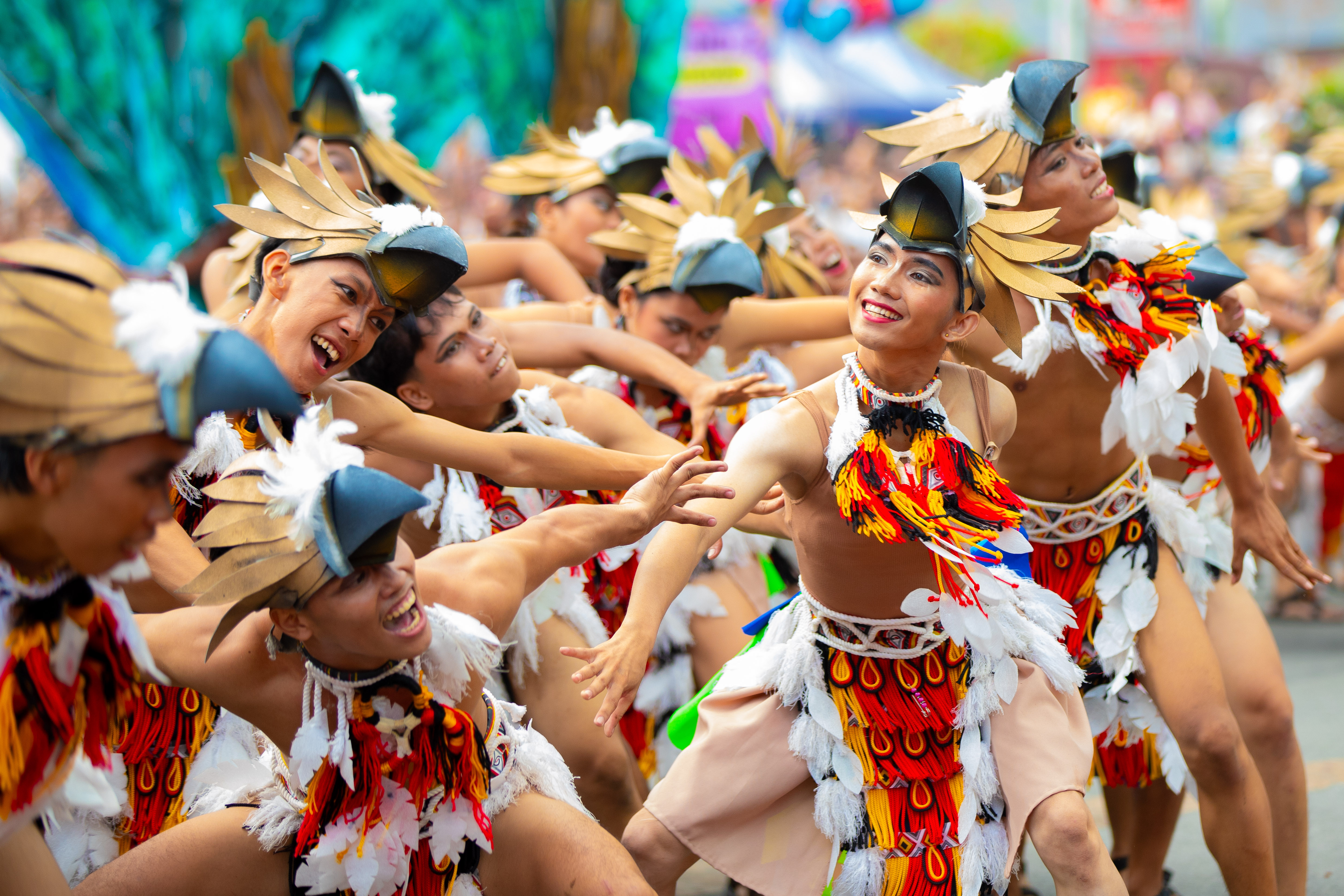
Kadayawan Festival, August 2026

=== Davao ===
Original air date: August 25, 2012 and September 1, 2012
In celebration of Kadayawan Festival, host Richard Gutierrez with his special guest Marian Rivera came to Davao. After that, Gutierrez explored the Bito Depression in Samal Island and he went down the cave filled with thousands of bats.

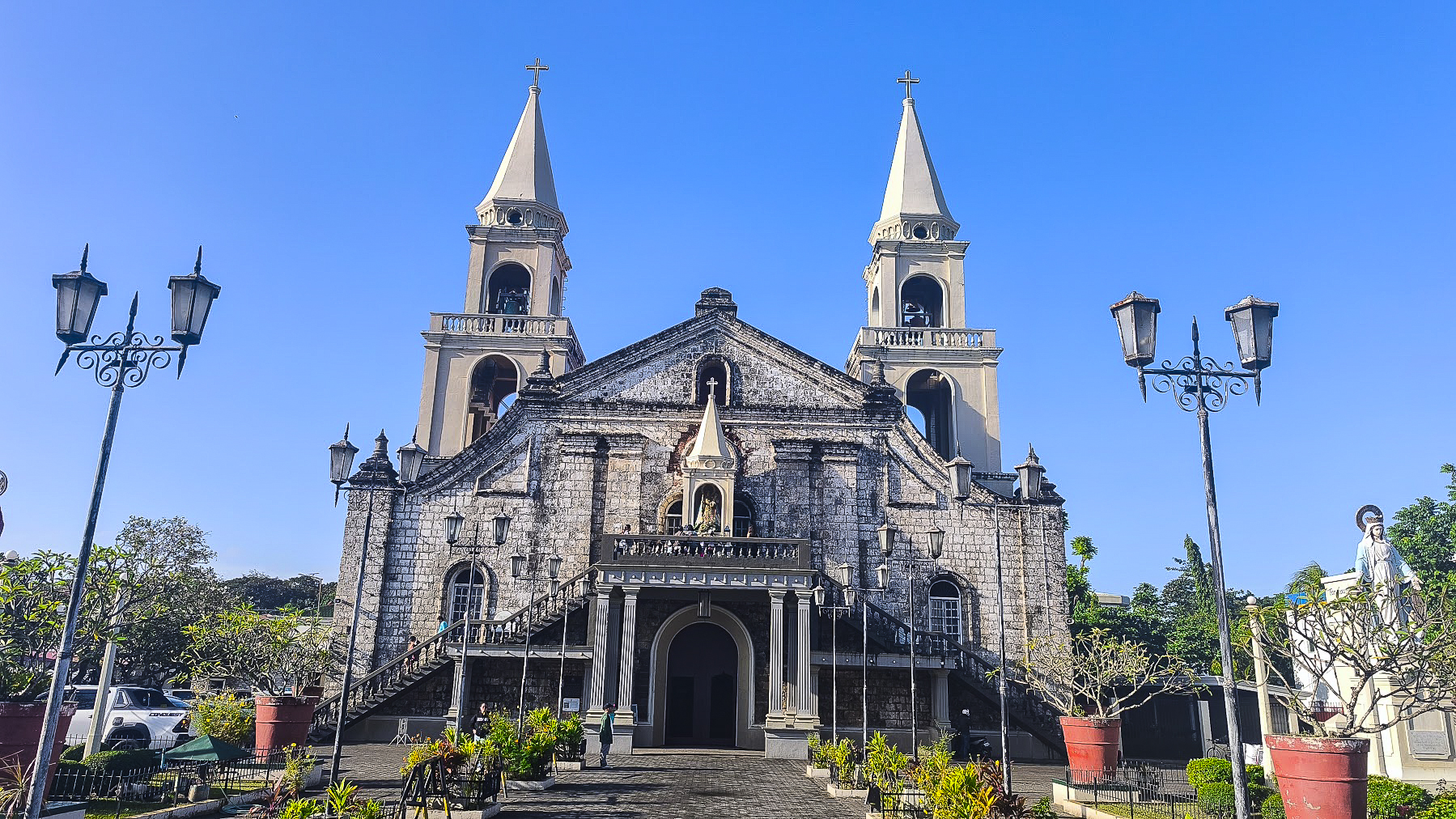
Jaro Metropolitan Cathedral of St. Elizabeth of Hungary & National Shrine of Our Lady of Candles

=== Iloilo ===
Original air date: September 8, 2012 and September 15, 2012
The program host first visits Jaro Cathedral, which is one of the oldest churches in the country. Romanesque-revival architecture constructs this shrine whose bell tower is unusually located across the Jaro Plaza. Iloilo is also known as the home of the famous La Paz batchoy, and it catches the host's interest. Aside from trying this Ilonggo favorite, Gutierrez also served this dish to hungry customers. Gutierrez then visits the town of Dingle to pass through century-old trees and trek caves with ancient writings on the walls. His biggest adventure was to climb the Nautod Wall.

=== Bicol ===
Original air date: September 22, 2012 and September 29, 2012
He then takes the adrenaline up a notch by riding an All-terrain vehicle going to Mayon Volcano. But Gutierrez's biggest challenge yet is to taste the signature chili dishes of Bicol. On the second part, the host and the rest of the team visited Camarines Sur and visits the beautiful Caramoan Islands to experience wake-boarding and mountain off-road driving.

== Ratings ==
According to AGB Nielsen Philippines' Mega Manila household television ratings, the pilot episode of Pinoy Adventures earned a 19.7% rating. The final episode scored an 18.2% rating.

== Accolades ==
Accolades received by Pinoy Adventures
Year	Award	Category	Recipient	Result	Ref.
2012	26th PMPC Star Awards for Television	Best Travel Show	Pinoy Adventures	Nominated	
2012	26th PMPC Star Awards for Television	Best Travel Show Host	Richard Gutierrez	Won	
2013	27th PMPC Star Awards for Television	Best Travel Show	Pinoy Adventures	Nominated	
2013	27th PMPC Star Awards for Television	Best Travel Show Host	Richard Gutierrez	Won	
