= Patient X (film) =

2009 Filipino horror film

- Official teaser poster
- Directed by: Yam Laranas
- Screenplay by: Yam Laranas; Aloy Adlawan
- Story by: Yam Laranas
- Produced by: Yam Laranas; Jose Mari Abacan; Vincent Del Rosario; Veronique Del Rosario
- Starring: Richard Gutierrez; Cristine Reyes
- Cinematography: Yam Laranas
- Edited by: Chuck Gutierrez
- Music by: Nani Naguit
- Production companies: GMA Films; Viva Films; RGUTZ Productions
- Distributed by: Viva Films
- Release date: October 28, 2009
- Running time: 92 minutes
- Country: Philippines
- Languages: Filipino; English
- Box office: ₱24,491,067.00

Patient X is a 2009 Filipino horror film written and directed by Filipino director Yam Laranas. The film stars Richard Gutierrez and Cristine Reyes.

== Synopsis ==
After twenty years, local police capture the murderer of the older brother of a young boy. Now a doctor, he must go back to his old town and face the murderers himself. He then discovers that the murderers are Aswangs (folkloric Filipino vampire-like creatures) and they pose a deadly threat not only to him but also for the entire town.

== Cast ==
=== Main cast ===
- Richard Gutierrez as Dr. Lukas Esguerra
- Cristine Reyes as Guada

=== Supporting cast ===
- TJ Trinidad as Alfred
- Miriam Quiambao as Nurse Betty
- Nanding Josef as Dr. Jack
- Elvis Guiterrez as Marcus
- Dion Ignacio as Samuel
- Barbie Forteza as Sonia
- Paulo Avelino as Robert
- Rocky Gutierrez as Mateo
- Crispin Pineda as Minoy
- Junyka Santarin as Mia
- Jake Vargas as James
- Che Ramos as Melinda
- Miggy Jimenez as young Lukas

== Release ==
Eleven Arts has bought the rights for the international sales duties for Patient X from both GMA Films and Viva Films. The film was released in the Philippines on October 28, 2009.

=== Reception ===
Derek Elley of Film Business Asia gave the film a rating of three out of 10 stating that "The film desperately needed a professional action director, and a proper horror score, to give it some pace." The final gross of the movie is ₱24,491,067.00 according to Box Office Mojo.

== See also ==
- List of ghost films
