= Love & Lies =

2013 Philippine television drama series

- Title card
- Genre: Drama thriller; Action
- Developed by: R.J. Nuevas; Dode Cruz
- Written by: Jules Dan Katanyag; Christine Novicio; Luningning Ribay
- Directed by: Mark A. Reyes V
- Creative director: Jun Lana
- Starring: Richard Gutierrez; Bela Padilla; Michelle Madrigal
- Theme music composer: Vehnee Saturno
- Opening theme: "Ngayo'y Naririto" by Jay R
- Country of origin: Philippines
- Original language: Tagalog
- No. of episodes: 44 (list of episodes)

Production
- Executive producers: Leilani Feliciano-Sandoval; Rebya Upalda
- Production locations: Sangley Point, Cavite; Tagaytay; Metro Manila
- Cinematography: Jay Linao
- Camera setup: Multiple-camera setup
- Running time: 30–45 minutes
- Production company: GMA Entertainment TV

Original release
- Network: GMA Network
- Release: April 8 – June 7, 2013

Love & Lies is a 2013 Philippine television drama action thriller series broadcast by GMA Network. Directed by Mark A. Reyes V, it stars Richard Gutierrez, Bela Padilla and Michelle Madrigal. It premiered on April 8, 2013, on the network's Telebabad line up. The series concluded on June 7, 2013, with a total of 44 episodes.

The series is streaming online on YouTube.

== Premise ==
Edward Galvez, a Philippine Navy officer gets tangled in a web of lies and conspiracies when an organization kidnaps his wife. As the protagonist discovers the truth behind the crime, he uncovers a treacherous plot that threatens to turn his world upside-down. The true perpetrators of the crime may be closer to home than he dare think. As he thread to the maze of lies, blackmails, double-dealings, and betrayals, everyone becomes a suspect.

== Cast and characters ==
Cast

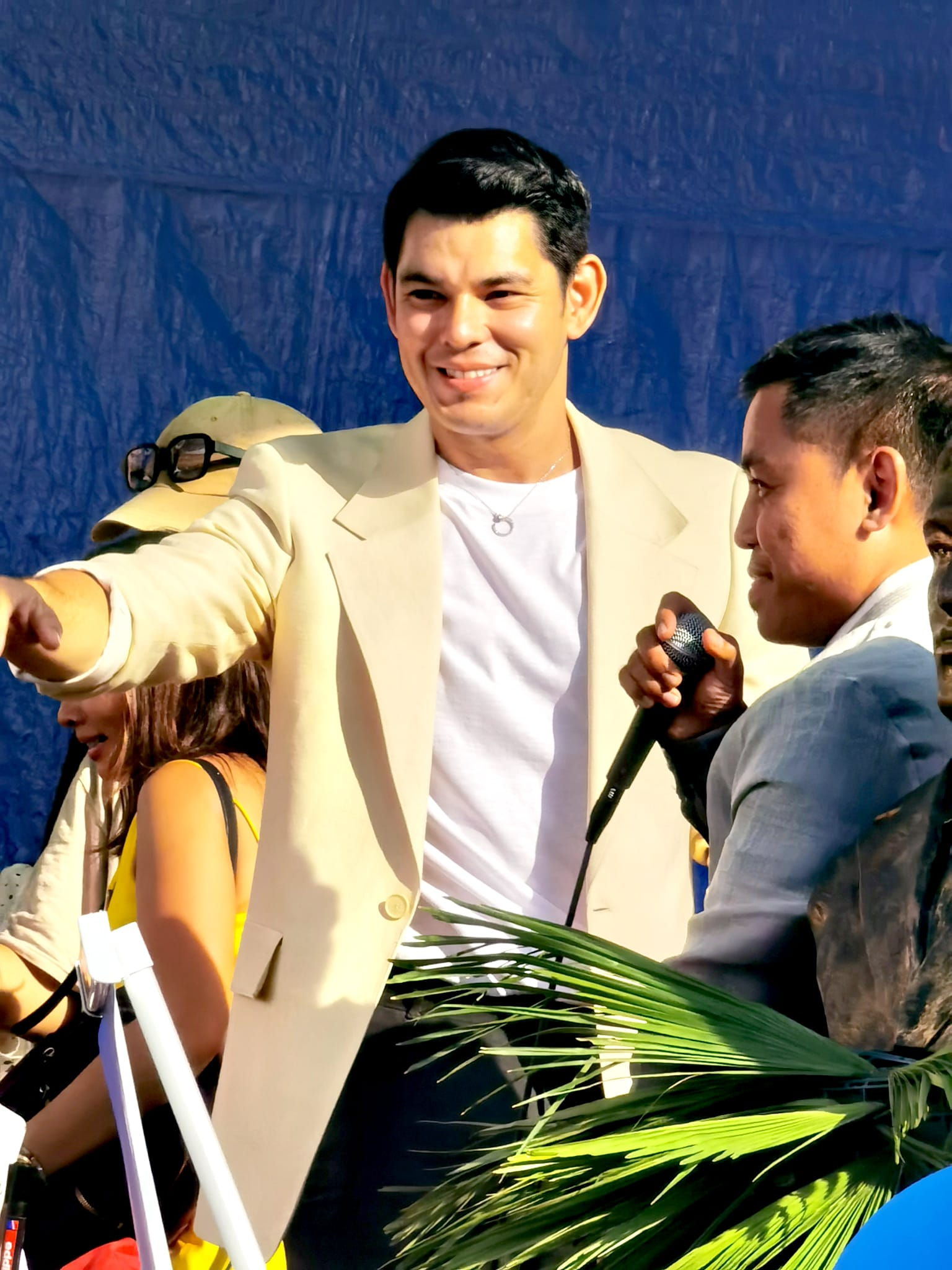
Richard Gutierrez

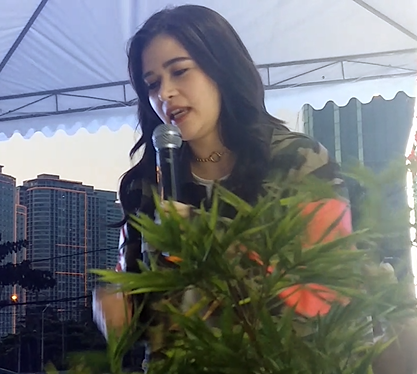
Bela Padilla

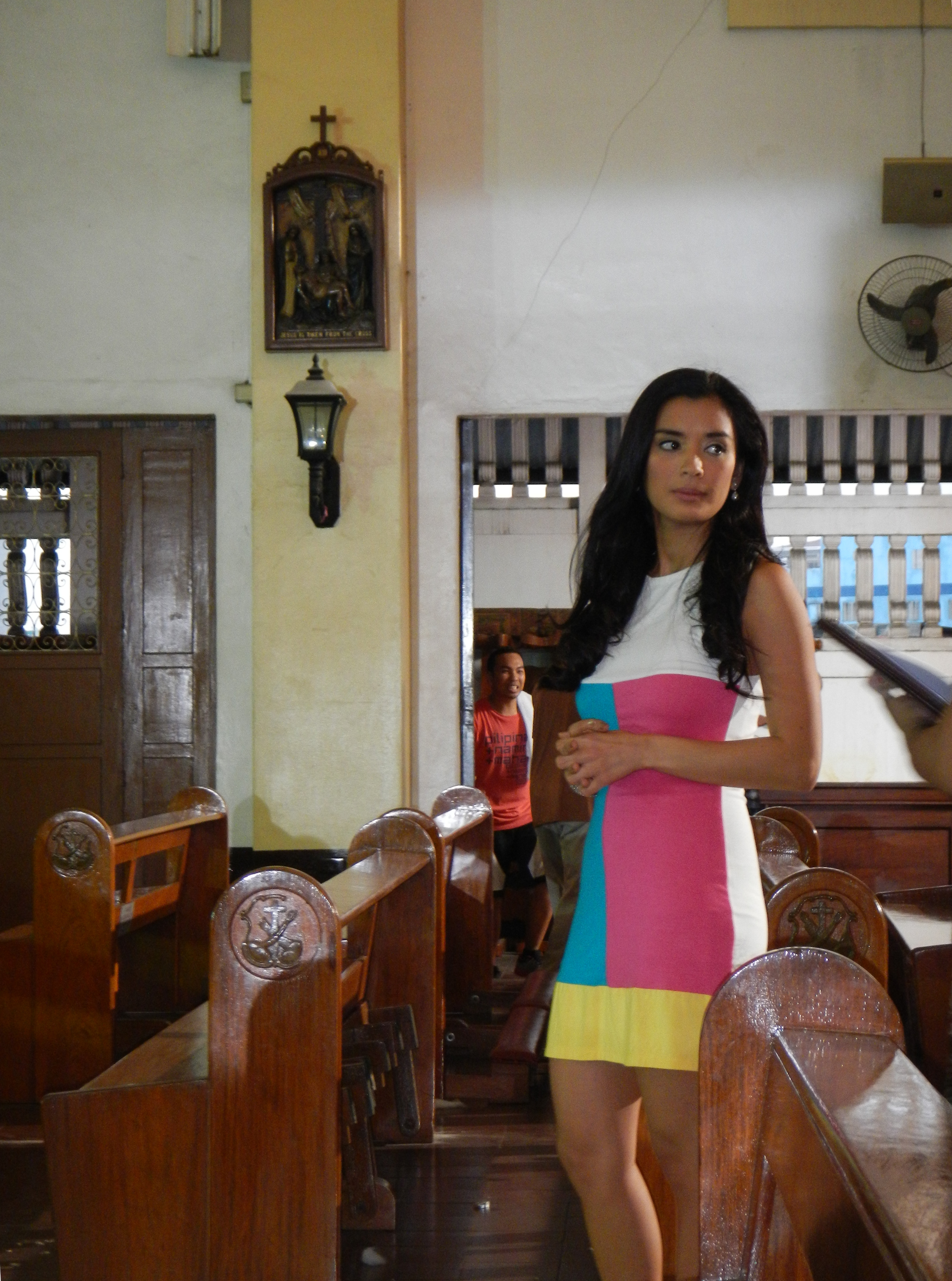
Michelle Madrigal

Lead cast

- Richard Gutierrez as Edward Galvez
- Bela Padilla as Denise Salvador-Galvez
- Michelle Madrigal as Catherine "Cathy" Alcantara-Galvez

Supporting cast

- Sid Lucero as Gabriel "Gabby" Romero
- Paolo Contis as Emmanuel "Manny" Perez
- Lloyd Samartino as Ramon Alcantara
- Lara Melissa de Leon as Consuelo Alcantara
- Bobby Andrews as Captain Jose Lorde Villamor
- Luz Valdez as Rosa Galvez
- Miguel Tanfelix as Marco Salvador
- Jeric Gonzales as Ryan Alcantara
- Thea Tolentino as Marissa Rivero-Alcantara

Guest cast

- Jade Lopez as Roxanne Salvador
- Neil Ryan Sese as Ricardo Salvador
- Gerard Pizarras as Ka Fredo
- Ian de Leon as Gardo Mendoza
- Shyr Valdez as Rosanna Rivero-Mendoza
- Aicelle Santos as Ligaya Salvador

== Development ==
The series—a fast-paced suspense-action drama, also dubbed as a "suspenserye" was conceptualized by RJ Nuevas and developed by Richard Cruz. The series began development under the title Notorious in January and February 2013.

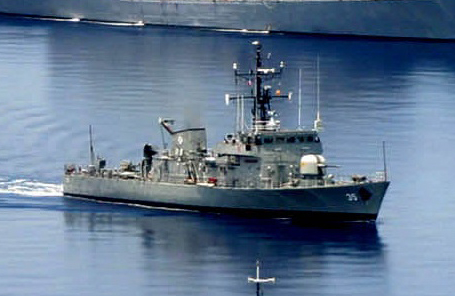
In the pilot episode, the series features BRP Emilio Jacinto PS-35, one of the two warships of Philippine Navy.

The production team picked the Philippine Navy as a major setting for the series. On March 13, 2013, the series' cast members Richard Gutierrez and Paolo Contis, and the series' director Mark Reyes visited the Headquarters Philippine Navy (HPN) and paid a courtesy call on the Navy Chief, Vice Admiral Jose Luis M. Alano AFP. Gutierrez and Contis signed up as Philippine Navy Reservists. Vice Admiral Alano assured the network that the Navy would provide its full support and assistance to the series. He stated "we look forward to this project in which we can show and highlight what the Philippine Navy is all about." and briefed Gutierrez and Contis about the rigid training and life of a Navy Seal.

The series' director described the show as his "dream project". Regarding the amount of action and drama being laced in the series, Reyes said that "the nearest thing that you can compare it to is Taken. There's a lot of suspense. At the same time, there's drama that is interwoven with it. The pacing is reminiscent of 24".

=== Casting ===
Richard Gutierrez was cast as the series' main protagonist, Edward Galvez. Director Mark Reyes revealed that the actor came first before the concept of the show. Gutierrez had to undergo tactical shooting training [in preparation for the role] ahead of the other cast members. He also immersed himself the Philippine Navy way.

Michelle Madrigal, Sid Lucero and Paolo Contis were cast to play three "important" roles. Madrigal felt pressured, her character Cathy Galvez was the "lynchpin" of the series. She said "my goal for this role is to showcase my capabilities as an actor, rather than show more skin."

The character Denise Salvador was initially offered to actress Lovi Poe. Bela Padilla took over the role. Padilla found her "kick-ass" character as "[...] very interesting. I would have auditioned for it if it weren't offered to me. Coming from the drama series Magdalena, it's refreshing to do a character who is strong, loud and bubbly." Padilla stated that her character was pegged on a female version of actor Robin Padilla.

== Production ==
Principal photography commenced on March 21, 2013. Some of the scenes in the pilot episode were shot in Philippine Navy headquarters in Sangley Point in Cavite City and in BRP Emilio Jacinto (PS 35) Philippine Navy warship. Series' director Reyes described the pilot ala-Crimson Tide.

== Ratings ==
According to AGB Nielsen Philippines' Mega Manila household television ratings, the pilot episode of Love & Lies earned a 22.8% rating. The final episode scored a 22.7% rating.
