= Kambal Tuko =

1988 Filipino fantasy comedy film

- Directed by: J. Erastheo Navoa
- Screenplay by: Jose Carreon
- Story by: J. Erastheo Navoa
- Starring: Susan Roces; Eddie Gutierrez; Richard Gutierrez; Raymond Gutierrez
- Cinematography: Ricardo Jacinto
- Edited by: George Jarlego
- Music by: Vehnee Saturnino
- Production company: Regal Films
- Release date: April 14, 1988
- Running time: 128 minutes
- Country: Philippines
- Language: Filipino

Kambal Tuko (lit. 'Gecko Twins') is a 1988 Filipino fantasy comedy film directed by J. Erastheo Navoa, written by Jose N. Carreon, and starring Susan Roces, Eddie Gutierrez, and twin child actors Richard and Raymond Gutierrez. Produced by Regal Films, the film was released on April 14, 1988. Critic Luciano Soriano of the Manila Standard gave Kambal Tuko a negative review, criticizing its fantastical elements and excessive number of characters as preventing the film from telling a potentially interesting story.

== Cast ==
- Susan Roces as Mely
- Eddie Gutierrez as Andoy
- Richard Gutierrez as Kokoy
- Raymond Gutierrez as Totoy
- Jenny Lyn as Jenny
- Isabel Granada as Isabel
- Fatima Alvir as Fatima
- Chuckie Dreyfuss as Chuckie
- Raffy Romillo as Raffy
- Brylle Mondejar as Sammy
- Palito as Papay
- Cecille Iñigo as Olive
- Max Alvarado as Father To Pak
- Manolet Ripoll as Manolet
- Philip Henson as Philip
- Mark Anthony as Mark
- Bernard Allan as Bernard
- Dencio Padilla as Mr. Dennis Labis
- Rudy Meyer as Entoy, a hunchback
- Bomber Moran as Boy Macho
- Larry Silva as Boy Kinis
- Boy Alano as Boy Unano
- Joaquin Fajardo (Jake Fajardo) as Boy Guapo
- Bing Angeles as feria bossman
- Ike Lozada as radio announcer
- Flora Gasser as Madame Koping, a psychic
- Lucy Quinto as Nana Paste
- Cris Dalus as an "albularyo"
- Coring Obnamia as an "albularyo"
- Tom Alvares as Tom
- Jun Visconde as Jun
- Dondie Contreras as Dondie
- Khess Kortes as teacher
- Leo Timones Jr. as Tabachoy
- Evelyn Vargas as Fruitella and a witch
- Minnie Aguilar as Orchidella and a witch
- Beverly Salviejo as Pinakbet and a witch

== Release ==
Kambal Tuko was released in the Philippines on April 14, 1988, with a ₱100,000 prize for viewers who could correctly identify both of the twin child actors.

=== Critical response ===
Luciano E. Soriano, writing for the Manila Standard, gave Kambal Tuko a negative review. He criticized its fantastical elements and excessive number of colorful characters as unnecessary, as he thought that the main premise of a family dealing with real-life issues in raising conjoined twins has potential to be a good story on its own.
