= Habang Kapiling Ka =

Philippine television drama series

- Title card
- Also known as: With You
- Genre: Romantic drama
- Developed by: Elmer Gatchalian
- Written by: Jessel Duque; Elmer L. Gatchalian; Abi Lam
- Directed by: Maryo J. de los Reyes
- Starring: Angelika Dela Cruz
- Theme music composer: Willie Cruz
- Opening theme: "Kahit Na" by Joey Albert
- Country of origin: Philippines
- Original language: Tagalog
- No. of episodes: 248

Production
- Executive producer: Redgynn Alba
- Camera setup: Multiple-camera setup
- Running time: 30 minutes
- Production company: GMA Entertainment TV

Original release
- Network: GMA Network
- Release: November 4, 2002 – October 17, 2003

Habang Kapiling Ka (transl. while I am with you / international title: With You) is a Philippine television drama romance series broadcast by GMA Network. Directed by Maryo J. de los Reyes, it stars Angelika Dela Cruz. It premiered on November 4, 2002 on the network's Telebabad line up. The series concluded on October 17, 2003, with a total of 248 episodes.

The series is streaming online on YouTube.

== Cast and characters ==
Cast

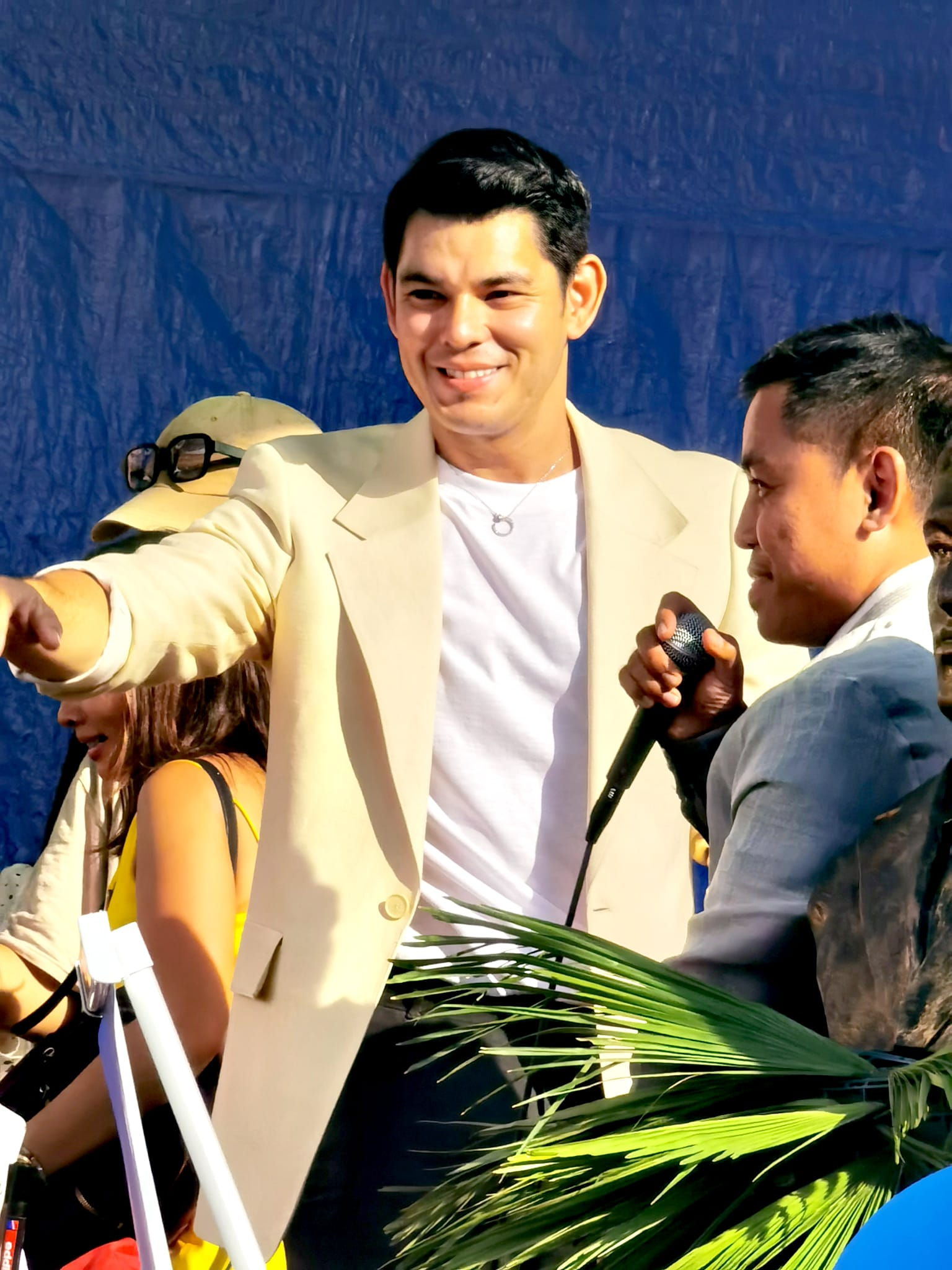
Richard Gutierrez

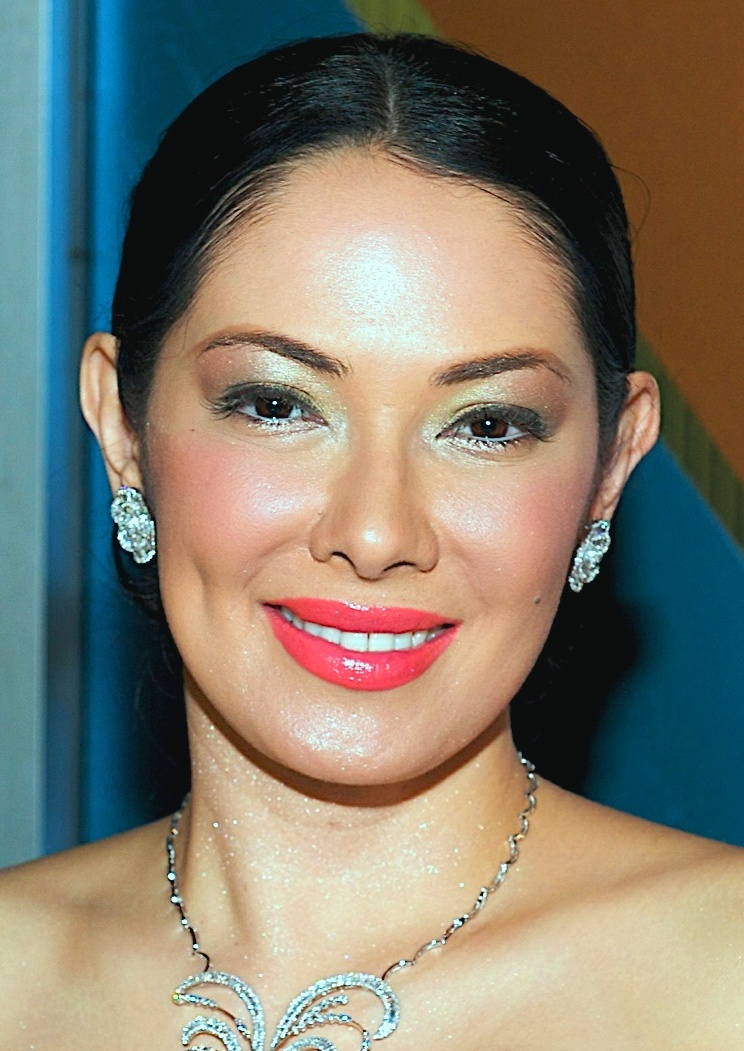
Ruffa Gutierrez

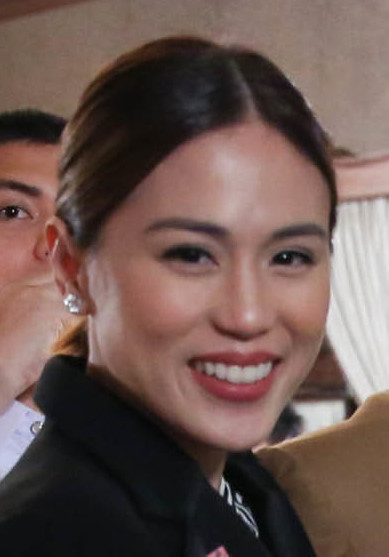
Toni Gonzaga

Lead cast

- Angelika Dela Cruz as Erica Malvarosa
- Victor Neri as Julius Javellana

Supporting cast

- Albert Martinez as Alejandro Javellana
- Snooky Serna as Olivia Malvarosa
- Tonton Gutierrez as Marius Malvarosa / Xandro / Kenji Ogata
- Richard Gutierrez as Basilio Malvarosa
- Chynna Ortaleza as Donna Javellana-Capistrano
- Toni Gonzaga as Emillie Capistrano-Bravo
- Railey Valeroso as Pierre Paolo Capistrano-Bravo
- Chin Chin Gutierrez as Helga Lamermoore
- Ruffa Gutierrez as Venus Paraiso
- Alma Moreno as Salve Capistrano
- Zoren Legaspi as Jonas Capistrano
- Amy Perez as Divine Ogata
- Yul Servo as Nonoy Bautista
- Jaime Fabregas as Fausto Bravo
- Aleck Bovick as Liway
- Tootsie Guevara as Bunny Bravo

Guest cast

- Divine Tetay
- Patricia Ismael
- Long Mejia as Badong
- Jake Roxas as Ludwig
- Hans Montenegro as Lino
- Nonie Buencamino as Javier
- Camille Roxas as Medea
- Andrea del Rosario as Nanette
- Lloyd Samartino as Milton
- Sheree Bautista as Magnolia
- Rosette Cancino as younger Emilie
- Cheng Luciano as younger Erika
- Johnjohn Castro as younger Julius
- Lorenzo Hemulgada as younger Pierre Paolo
- Kitchie Nadal as Kimmie
- Manny Pacquiao as himself
- Jinkee Pacquiao as herself

== Accolades ==
Accolades received by Habang Kapiling Ka
Year	Award	Category	Recipient	Result	Ref.
2003	14th PMPC Star Awards for Television	Best Drama Actress	Angelika dela Cruz	Nominated	
2003	14th PMPC Star Awards for Television	Best Drama Actress	Snooky Serna	Won	
2003	14th PMPC Star Awards for Television	Best Drama Series	Habang Kapiling Ka	Nominated	
