= Let the Love Begin (film) =

- Official movie poster
- Directed by: Mac Alejandre
- Written by: Suzette Doctolero; R.J. Nuevas
- Produced by: Jose Mari Abacan; Annette Gozon-Abrogar
- Starring: Richard Gutierrez; Angel Locsin; Mark Herras; Jennylyn Mercado
- Cinematography: Regiben O. Romana
- Edited by: Kelly M. Cruz
- Music by: Vincent De Jesus
- Production company: GMA Films
- Distributed by: GMA Films
- Release date: February 9, 2005
- Running time: 115 minutes
- Country: Philippines
- Language: Filipino
- Box office: ₱106 million

Let the Love Begin is a 2005 Philippine romantic drama film directed by Mac Alejandre. It stars Richard Gutierrez, Angel Locsin, Jennylyn Mercado and Mark Herras. This is GMA Films' first feature film in 5 years.

The film is streaming online on YouTube.

== Plot ==
Pia (Angel Locsin) is beautiful and wealthy high school student. She is the campus sweetheart that every guy is dreaming of. However, she is unhappy because her father (Tonton Gutierrez) constantly blames her for her brother's death, and makes all the decisions with regard to her future. Eric (Richard Gutierrez), Pia's high school classmate, is intelligent and has a good heart, but lives in poverty. Both of his parents have already died. He is left with his kind and loving grandmother who continues to encourage him to pursue his dreams and his love for Pia, no matter what obstacles get in his way. Eric works as the school's janitor during the day to support his studies, and to provide for him and his grandmother's needs. He has always admired Pia but never really had the courage or the chance to even talk to her. Although they belong to the extremes of social classes, Pia and Eric's paths cross when they share the same seat in class - Eric during the night (as part of his scholarship program) and Pia during the day. Eric becomes Pia's anonymous 'savior' as he answered Pia's school-related questions, and promised to always be there whenever she needed him. Are they destined to be with each other because of this sign? Or is fate playing a trick on them?

Meanwhile, in the background, one of Eric's best friends, Luigi (Mark Herras) is the typical playboy, and often changes his girlfriend. This has gone on since they were in highschool. Luigi best friend is Eric, but on the sidelines, Alex (Jennylyn Mercado). Alex is a tomboy who has a crush on Luigi. After five years, she changed and blossomed into a beautiful girl, with Luigi falling in love with her.

== Cast ==
- Richard Gutierrez as Eric
- Angel Locsin as Patricia "Pia" Castillo
- Mark Herras as Luigi
- Jennylyn Mercado as Alex
- Gloria Romero as Lola Maring
- Paolo Contis as Uno
- Bearwin Meily as Boy Palito
- Tuesday Vargas as Wendy
- Tonton Gutierrez as Jake
- Dino Guevarra as Wency
- Mon Confiado as Baldo
- Polo Ravales as Brix
- Nanette Inventor as Lucing
- Nicole Anderson as Nicole
- Jerome John Hughes as Jaime
- Julianne Lee as Lucille
- Geoff Rodriguez as Dave
- Shamrock as Themselves
- Tessbomb as Tess
- Maggie Wilson as Bridget
- Mel Kimura as Ms. Ferrer

== Theme song ==
The title of the movie is based on the song, Let the love begin. The song was written by Gloria Sklerov and Lenny Macaluso and performed by Jimmy Demers and Carol Sue Hill for the love theme of the American movie Thrashin'.

In the Philippines, the song was first popularized by Gino Padilla, who in duet with fellow singer Rocky, released in 1987 a version of the song. In the movie Let the Love Begin, Kyla and Jerome John Hughes sang the song for its soundtrack.

== Trivia ==
- Epson and McDonald's, major sponsors of the film, are promoted in several scenes.
- Most of the classroom scenes were filmed at the Lyceum of the Philippines University.
- The airport scene was shot at Clark International Airport.
- The soccer field scene was shot at the Claret School of Quezon City.
- The movie starred Richard's older half-brother, Tonton Gutierrez.

== Media release ==
The series was released onto DVD-format and VCD-format by GMA Records. The DVD contained the movie plus bonus features like the music video of "Let the Love Begin" plus the full-length trailer of the movie and Karaoke features. The DVD/VCD was released in 2005.
