= Raymond Gutierrez =

Filipino actor (born 1984)

- Born: Raymond Kristoffer Gutierrez (Note: Raymond Gutierrez is a United States citizen. Thus, he does not possess his mother's maiden name (Rama) as is the convention in the Philippines.); January 21, 1984 (age 42); Beverly Hills, California, U.S.
- Citizenship: United States; Philippines
- Occupations: Host; model; actor
- Years active: 1987–present
- Parents: Eddie Gutierrez (father); Annabelle Rama (mother)
- Relatives: Vicente Rama (great-grandfather); Bruno Mars (third-cousin)
- Family: Gutierrez family

Raymond Kristoffer Gutierrez (born January 21, 1984) is a Filipino television host, actor, and entrepreneur. He is best known for hosting Pinoy Idol in 2008. He was also one of the hosts of Showbiz Police and Showbiz Central.

== Early life ==
Raymond Gutierrez was born in Los Angeles, California on January 21, 1984 to matinee idol Eddie Gutierrez and talent manager Annabelle Rosales Rama-Gutierrez. He is the 5th of six siblings. He has an older sister Ruffa Gutierrez, a twin brother Richard Gutierrez, two older brothers, Rocky Gutierrez and Elvis Gutierrez, and a younger brother Ritchie Paul Gutierrez. He also has two older half-brothers Tonton Gutierrez and Ramon Christopher Gutierrez.

After living for a few years in the Philippines, his family moved to Beverly Hills, California. He attended Beverly Hills High School in Beverly Hills, California.

== Personal life ==
He began acting as a child with his twin Richard. He has also worked with his father and his other siblings in some Filipino movies.

According to his parents, Eddie and Annabelle Gutierrez, Raymond is the funniest among the Gutierrez children. They said that Raymond is the one who makes them laugh the most. His mother added that among her 6 children, Raymond is the most diligent and that he was the only one who did not need a tutor while growing up.

In September 2012, his mother filed her Certificate of Candidacy as a congresswoman in Cebu but lost during the 2013 elections.

Gutierrez identifies himself as a "Nightlife Connoisseur" in their reality TV series It Takes Gutz to be a Gutierrez.

=== Sexuality ===
On August 1, 2021, Gutierrez came out as gay in an interview with MEGA Entertainment magazine.

In June 2022, Gutierrez introduced his boyfriend Robert William per Instagram, whom he met at a dinner in a Los Angeles restaurant.

== Career ==
Gutierrez has been offered to act in movies and on TV shows but has declined to do so. He says he will just leave it to twin brother Richard, and that he wants to focus on his hosting.

His hosting skills has been praised and awarded many times. He has also impressed some famous personalities who already made their names in the business, like Ryan Seacrest who praised his way of opening his then show, Pinoy Idol.

In October 2011, he became the style director for Esquire Magazine Philippines.

Gutierrez is an endorser of Sexy Solution by Belo. He is also the launch creative consultant and one of the brand ambassadors of Magnum ice cream in the Philippines.

On January 25, 2012, Gutierrez signed a 3-year contract with Viva Entertainment along with his siblings, Richard and Ruffa.

In 2012, Gutierrez became active in hosting live, non-televised events for launching different products in the Philippines. In May 2012, he hosted press events for Bench to launch endorsers such as Joe Jonas of Jonas Brothers, and Allison Harvard and Dominique Reighard of America's Next Top Model.

In June 2012, Gutierrez attended the Men's Fashion Week in London to represent Esquire Philippines.

In July 2012, he became an endorser for Bench/Fix Salon, which is part of the Bench clothing brand.

In August 2012, Showbiz Central, which he co-hosted for 5 years, was replaced with H.O.T. TV, which he still co-hosts. He was also launched as one of the endorsers of TRESemmé in the Philippines.

On September 6, 2012, he hosted the launch of the first Philippine branch of Cotton On in SM Mall Of Asia. On September 22, he hosted the launch of the second in SM Megamall.

Gutierrez also took part in Dolphy Alay Tawa: A Musical Tribute to the King of Philippine Comedy. He co-hosted a segment with his sister Ruffa Gutierrez.

Gutierrez co-owns the Gramercy Cafe which opened in February 2014 and is located at the Gramercy Tower in Makati, Philippines.

== Filmography ==
=== Film ===
Year	Title	Role	Notes
1987	Lahing Pikutin	Himself	
1987	Takbo, Bilis, Takbo	Himself	
1988	Kambal Tuko	Totoy	
1988	One Two Bato, Three Four Bapor	Amboy	
1988	Juan Tanga, Super Naman, at ang Kambal na Tiyanak	Tong	
1989	Feel Na Feel	Jumbo	
1992	Takbo Talon Tili!	Toto	
2012	Kimmy Dora and the Temple of Kiyeme	Himself, party guest	Cameo appearance
2013	Coming Soon	Himself	Cameo appearance

=== Television ===
Year	Title	Role	Notes
2004	Stage 1: LIVE!	Himself/host	
2004	CLICK Barkada Hunt	Himself/host	
2004–2010	SOP Gigsters and SOP	Himself/host	
2005	Sugo	Amante	Body double of Richard Gutierrez
2005–2010	StarStruck	Himself/host	
2005–2007	MMS, Music Mo Sikat!	Himself/VJ	
2007–2009	Living It Up	Himself / Host	
2007	Binibining Pilipinas 2007	Himself / Host	
2007–2012	Showbiz Central	Himself / Host	
2008	A Handsome Journey	Himself / Host	
2008	Pinoy Idol	Himself / Host	
2009	Eat Bulaga!	Himself / Guest	Aired on September 5, 2009, "Pinoy Henyo" with Richard Gutierrez
2010–2013	Party Pilipinas	Himself / Host	
2010	Diva	Himself / Talk Show Host	2 episodes
2012	Kris TV	Himself / Guest	Aired on January 30, 2012. With Georgina Wilson, Liz Uy and Vice Ganda.
2012	Gandang Gabi Vice	Himself / Guest	"The Trending Birthday Concert Part 2" Episode. With Georgina Wilson and Liz Uy.
2012–2013	H.O.T. TV	Himself / Host	replaced Showbiz Central
2012	Eat Bulaga!	Himself / Guest Judge	2 episodes: August 3: (to promote H.O.T. TV); September 15: "Mr. Pogi 2012" Grand Finals
2012	Dolphy Alay Tawa	Himself / Segment Host	
2013	Sarap Diva	Himself / Guest	Aired on March 23, with Richard Gutierrez & Eddie Gutierrez
2013–2014	Showbiz Police	Himself / Host	
2013	Give Love. Give Back Philippines: A Justin Bieber Special	Himself / Host	
2013	The Mega and the Songwriter	Himself / Guest Host	Christmas Special
2014	Kris TV	Himself / Guest	Aired on February 6, 2014. In promotion of 71 Gramercy.
2014	It Takes Gutz to Be a Gutierrez	Himself	
2017	La Luna Sangre	Doubled / Special appearance	Aired on June 23, 2017
2017	Eat Bulaga!	Himself / Jackpot En Poy Player	Aired on June 24, 2017
2017	Celebrity Bluff	Himself / Player	Aired on June 24, 2017, with Ruffa Gutierrez
2017	Magandang Buhay	Himself / Guest	
2018	It's Showtime	Himself / Guest judge	Guest judge for Miss Q&A, aired on October 25, 2018

== Magazines ==
- Preview (as Section Editor)
- Esquire Philippines (as Style Editor, 2011–present)

== Newspapers ==
- "The Dialogue" (column) (The Philippine Star, Fridays)
