= Gutierrez family =

Filipino family of actors

The Gutierrez family is a Filipino family of entertainers.

== List of members ==
1. Eddie Gutierrez
  1. with Pilita Corrales, had
    1. Ramon Christopher
      1. ∞ married Lotlot de Leon (annulled), they have four children: Diego, Janine, Maxine and Jessica.
        1. Janine Gutierrez
        2. Diego Gutierrez
  2. with Liza Lorena, had
    1. Tonton Gutierrez
      1. ∞ married Glydel Mercado, they have two daughters: Aneeka and Aneeza.
  3. ∞ married Annabelle Rama, they have 6 children: Ruffa, Rocky, Elvis, Richard, Raymond and Ritchie Paul.
    1. Ruffa Gutierrez
      1. ∞ married Yilmaz Bektas (divorced), have two daughters: Venice and Lorin.
    2. Richard Gutierrez
      1. ∞ married Sarah Lahbati (separated), they have two sons: Zion and Kai.
    3. Raymond Gutierrez
