= Ruffa Gutierrez =

Filipino actress and model

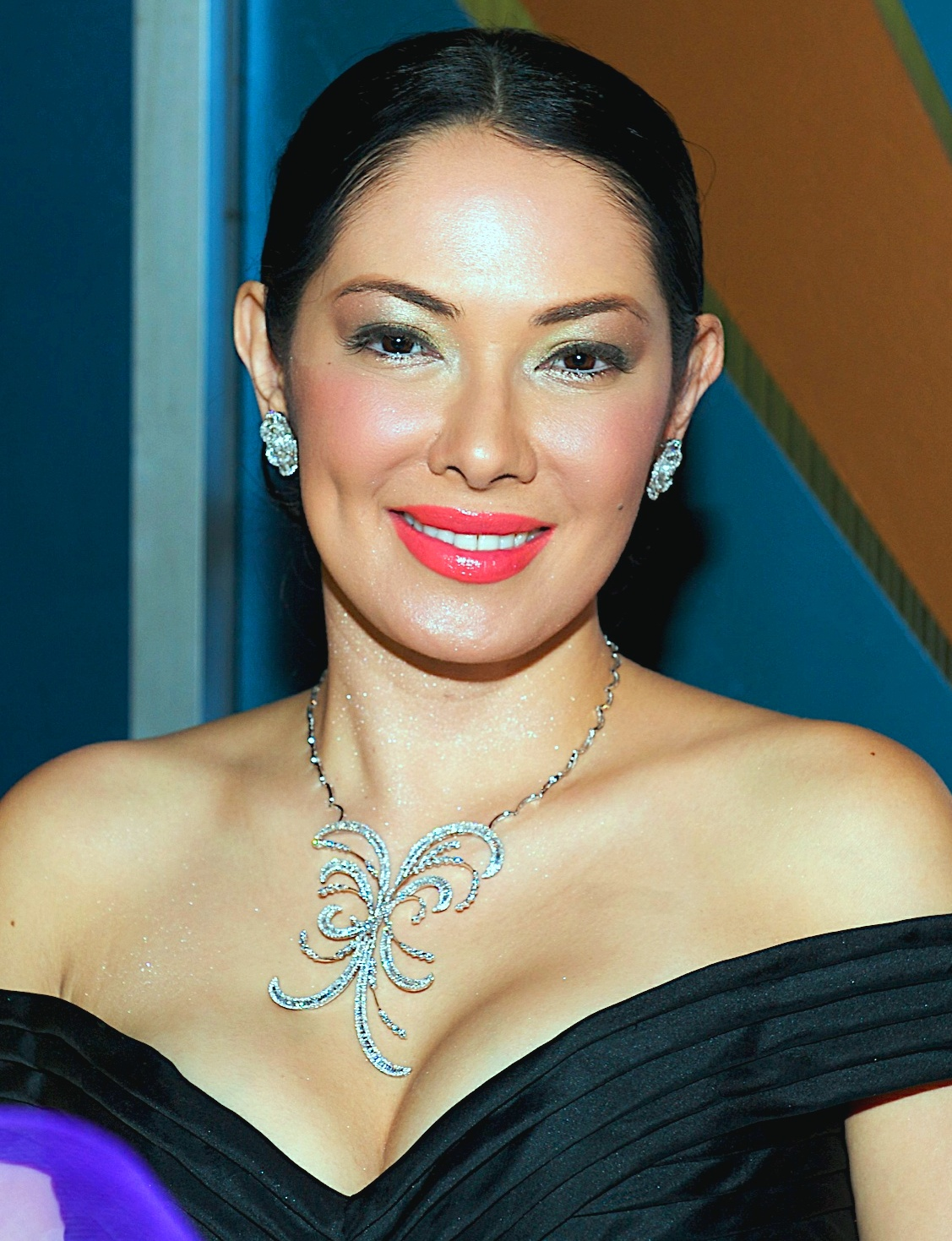
- Gutierrez in 2009
- Born: Sharmaine Ruffa Rama Gutierrez; June 24, 1974 (age 52); Manila, Philippines
- Education: Philippine Women's University (BA)
- Occupations: Actress, model, host
- Spouses: Richard Daloia (m. 1999; div. 2007); Yilmaz Bektas (m. 2003; ann. 2012)
- Children: 2
- Parent(s): Eddie Gutierrez (father); Annabelle Rama (mother)
- Relatives: Gutierrez family
- Beauty pageant titleholder
- Title: Binibining Pilipinas World 1993
- Years active: 1987–present
- Hair color: Black
- Eye color: Brown
- Major competitions: Binibining Pilipinas 1993 (winner – Binibining Pilipinas World 1993); Miss World 1993 (2nd runner-up; Miss World Asia and Oceania)

Sharmaine Ruffa Rama Gutierrez (born June 24, 1974) is a Filipino actress, model, TV host, and beauty pageant titleholder. She won Binibining Pilipinas World 1993 and was second runner-up to Miss World 1993.

== Career ==
Gutierrez began acting as a teenager in the 1980s, under BMG Films. She became part of German Moreno's variety show That's Entertainment in the early 1990s before becoming a beauty queen in 1993. In December 1990, Gutierrez replaced Snooky Serna for the lead role in Regal Film's Wunder Wuman Plus One, paired with comedian Rene Requiestas. However, the project did not come to fruition, with Gutierrez and Requiestas instead paired in the 1993 film Hulihin: Probinsyanong Mandurukot.

As the official representative of her country to the 1993 Miss World pageant held in Sun City, South Africa, on November 27, Gutierrez placed second runner-up to winner Lisa Hanna of Jamaica.

In 1993, Gutierrez was linked to the Brunei beauties affair. She denied being a prostitute, but she also denied having ever been in Brunei, a statement that was contradicted by evidence. The next year, she won best actress at the Manila Film Festival for the sexually explicit movie Loretta: The Woman Who Cut Off Happiness. Investigations revealed that she was not the nominee but had plotted to steal the prize in front of the cameras.

In the late 1980s and 1990s, she did multiple films each year from 1987 to 1998 with Regal Films. She ventured into television again as a regular TV host on the Sunday talk show The Buzz, and then in 2010 with Paparazzi on rival station TV5.

Gutierrez played a supporting role on the 2023 Philippine romantic drama series Can't Buy Me Love.

== Business ==
In 2022, Gutierrez launched her lifestyle business, Gutz and Glow with product of skin solutions.

== Personal life ==
A member of the prominent Gutierrez family, Ruffa is the only daughter of actor Eddie Gutierrez and talent manager Annabelle Rama. She has five brothers: Elvis, Rocky, Ritchie Paul, and fellow actors Raymond and Richard. She also has two half-brothers, Tonton and Ramon Christopher, from her father's previous relationships.

In 2003, she married Yilmaz Bektas, a Turkish businessman. They have two daughters, Lorin, who is studying at Pepperdine University in the United States, and Venice. They announced their separation through a joint statement on May 8, 2007. The annulment was granted on February 24, 2012.

In 2022, Gutierrez graduated with a Bachelor's Degree in Communication Arts from Philippine Women's University and is enrolled in Master of Communication Arts.

Gutierrez resides in Ayala Alabang, Muntinlupa. In July 2022, Gutierrez was accused of dismissing two domestic workers from her residence, which she denied. The workers filed a complaint with the Department of Labor and Employment (DOLE), alleging unpaid wages and other claims. She was ordered to pay the workers a total of ₱13,299.92 (US$233.16).

In June 2024, Gutierrez revealed her serious relationship with Herbert Bautista. They first dated during production of the 2020 Philippine romantic comedy The House Arrest of Us.

== Filmography ==
=== Film ===
Year	Title	Role
1987	Takbo...! Bilis...! Takboooo	
1988	Sheman: Mistress of the Universe	Tima
1988	I Love You 3x a Day	Agnes Reyes
1989	Last 2 Minutes	Ruffa
1990	Tora-Tora, Bang Bang Bang	
1991	Underage, Too	Ruffa
1991	Banana Split (Basta Driver Sweet Lover)	
1993	Dunkin Donato	Susan
1993	Maricris Sioson Story (Japayuki)	Maricris
1993	Hulihin: Probinsyanong Mandurukot	Ningning
1994	Lab Kita, Bilib Ka Ba?	Gema
1994	Shake, Rattle & Roll V	Laurie
1996	Ang Pinakamagandang Hayop sa Balat ng Lupa	Isabel
2007	Desperadas	Isabella Verona
2008	My Monster Mom	Abby Gail Fajardo
2008	Desperadas 2	Isabella Verona
2009	Shake, Rattle & Roll 11	Kayla
2010	Working Girls	Marilou Cobarrubias
2012	The Mommy Returns	Catherine Laurel-Martirez
2012	Sosy Problems	Luca
2013	Girl, Boy, Bakla, Tomboy	Marie
2014	Maybe This Time	Monica Valencia
2019	The Mall, the Merrier!	Annabelle/Herself
2022	Maid in Malacañang	Imelda Marcos
2023	Martyr or Murderer	Imelda Marcos

=== Television ===
Year	Title	Role
1988–1996	That's Entertainment	Herself (host)
1995–1998, 2023–present	Eat Bulaga!	Herself (host / guest performer)
2002	Habang Kapiling Ka	Venus Paraiso
2006	Bahay Mo Ba 'To	Doktora Fanikera Grabe
2007	Kokey	Trining Calugdan
2007	Philippines' Next Top Model	Herself (host/judge)
2007–2010	The Buzz	Herself (host)
2008	I Love Betty La Fea	Daniella Valencia
2009	Ruffa & Ai	Herself (host)
2010	Paparazzi	Herself (host)
2011	Mga Nagbabagang Bulaklak	Orchidia Ortega
2011	Regal Shocker: Red Shoes	Karina
2011	Glamorosa	Naomi Malandrino
2012	Enchanted Garden	Diwani Valeriana
2013	Toda Max	Susie
2014	Home Sweetie Home	Cristina
2014	It Takes Gutz to Be a Gutierrez	Herself (host)
2015	Misterless Misis	Diana
2015	Wansapanataym: Raprap's Wrapper	Connie
2016	Bakit Manipis ang Ulap?	Alicia
2018	Ngayon at Kailanman	Loreta
2020	Love Thy Woman	Amanda del Mundo
2020	Stay-In Love	Gigi
2021–2025	It's Showtime	Herself (Royal Choosegado / Authoriteam)
2022	I Can See Your Voice	Herself (guest "SING-vestigator")
2022–2025	M.O.M.S — Mhies on a Mission	Herself (host)
2023	Can't Buy Me Love	Gina Tan
2025	Beauty Empire	Velma Imperial

=== Online series ===
Year	Title	Role
2020	The House Arrest of Us	Zenaida "Zena" Capili

Awards and achievements
Preceded by (Thailand) Metinee Kingpayome	Miss World Asia & Oceania; 1993	Succeeded by (India) Aishwarya Rai
Preceded by (Venezuela) Francis Gago	Miss World 2nd runner-up 1993	Succeeded by (Venezuela) Irene Fereira
