= Richard Gutierrez =

Filipino actor (born 1984)

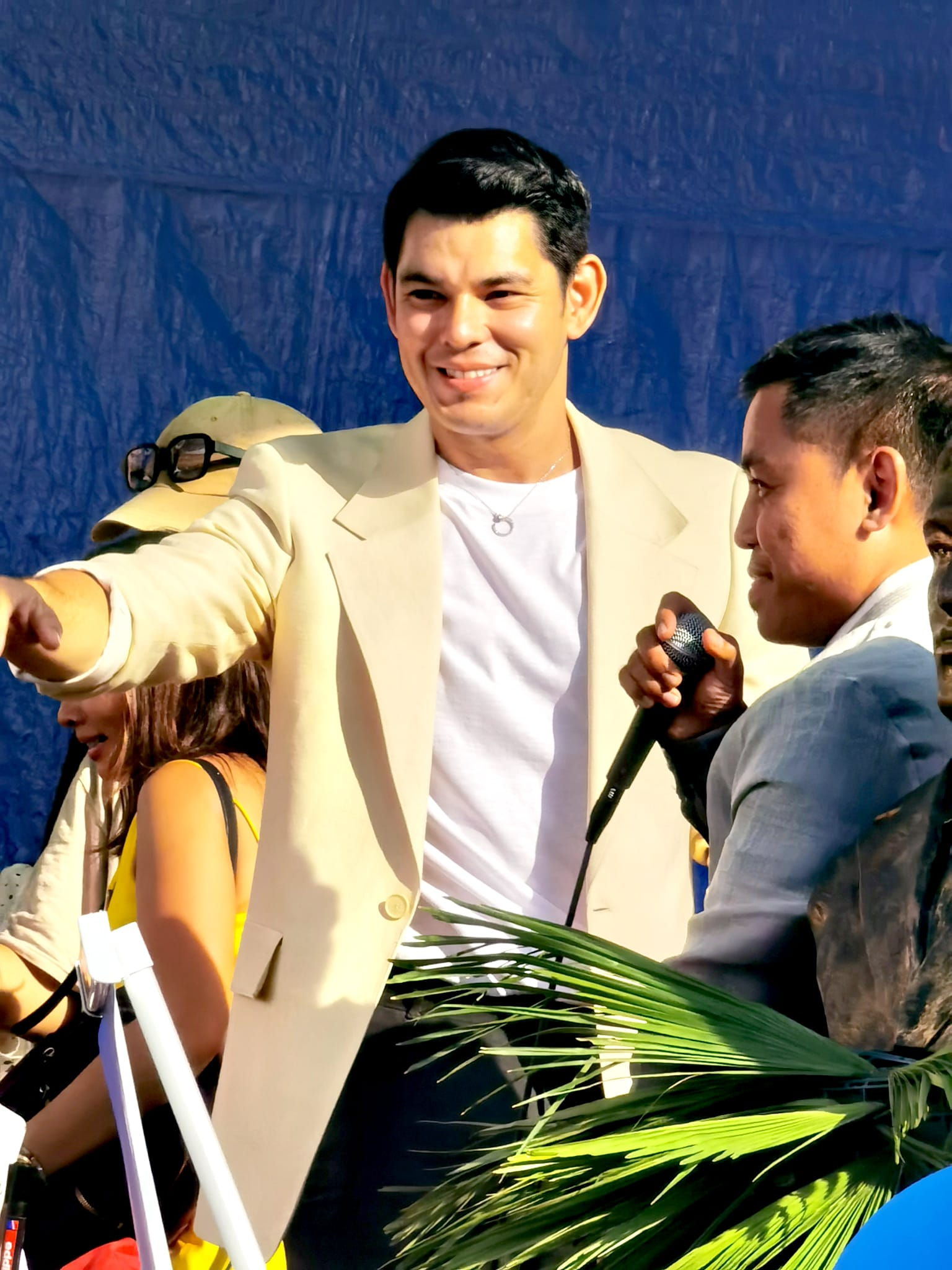
- Gutierrez in 2023
- Born: Richard Kristian Gutierrez (Note: Richard Gutierrez was born in the United States. Thus, he does not possess his mother's maiden name (Rama) as is the convention in the Philippines.); January 21, 1984 (age 42); Beverly Hills, California, U.S.
- Citizenship: United States; Philippines
- Occupations: Actor; model; producer
- Years active: 1986–present
- Agent(s): Sparkle (2001–2008); Viva Artists Agency (2008–2016); Star Magic (2018–present)
- Television: GMA Network (2001–2013); ABS-CBN (since 2017); ALLTV2 (since 2024); TV5 Network (since 2021)
- Spouse: Sarah Lahbati (m. 2020; sep. 2023)
- Children: 2
- Parents: Eddie Gutierrez (father); Annabelle Rama (mother)
- Relatives: Vicente Rama (great-grandfather); Bruno Mars (third cousin)
- Family: Gutierrez family

Richard Kristian Gutierrez (born January 21, 1984) is a Filipino actor. He is regarded by the media as the original "Fantaserye King" for top billing multiple hit television series.

Gutierrez is a recipient of a FAMAS Award and three PMPC Star Awards for Television. In 2010, Planet Philippines won a Bronze World Medal for Environment and Ecology at the New York Festivals Television and Film Awards. The same year, he became the spokesperson of the National Commission for Culture and the Arts (NCCA) for the National Arts Month-Philippine International Arts Festival (NAM-PIAF). Gutierrez was also the celebrity spokesperson of Greenpeace Southeast Asia. He is also referred to as the "Valentine Box-Office King" for headlining several box office hits like Let the Love Begin, When I Met U, My Best Friend's Girlfriend and My Lady Boss. In 2015, he was handpicked by Korean producers to host the first ever KPop Icon Search Pinoy Edition (KisPinoy).

== Early life and background ==
Richard Kristian Rama Gutierrez was born on January 21, 1984, in Beverly Hills, California, United States with his twin brother, Raymond to actor Eddie Gutierrez and talent manager Annabelle Rama. He has five siblings (Ruffa, Rocky, Elvis, Raymond and Ritchie Paul) and two older half-brothers (Tonton and Ramon Christopher).

== Acting career ==
Gutierrez began acting as a child with his twin brother. He has worked in many movies with his father and his brothers. He appeared on the GMA-7 show Click and primetime series Ikaw Lang ang Mamahalin and Habang Kapiling Ka with Angelika dela Cruz. He starred in the TV fantasy series Mulawin which aired from August 2, 2004 until March 18, 2005, where he played the lead character Aguiluz. The series led to a feature-length film of the same name (Mulawin: The Movie). Since then he has played lead roles in other GMA-7 shows including Sugo, Kamandag, Codename: Asero, Zorro, Lupin, Full House and Captain Barbell (both the 2006 prequel and the 2011 sequel). Gutierrez signed a non-exclusivity contract with Viva Artists Agency in 2008, wherein he worked in a movie Patient X and where his ex-girlfriend Anne Curtis is a talent; in 2015, he, his twin brother Raymond and sister Ruffa signed an exclusivity contract with Viva Artists Agency.

In 2012, Gutierrez headlined GMA Network's Heavy Drama & Action Series entitled Makapiling Kang Muli. He is also an Greenpeace spokesperson and environmentalist and hosted documentary and reality series and television specials such as Anatomy of a Disaster, Full Force Nature, Pinoy Adventures, Signos: Banta ng Nagbabagong Klima, Planet Philippines, the third and fourth seasons of Survivor Philippines, Oras Na, Wildlife for Sale, Extra Challenge Extreme and Puso ng Pasko: Artista Challenge.

Gutierrez was a freelance actor following the end of his exclusive contract with GMA Network on June 26, 2013. On August 7, it was reported by the Philippine Entertainment Portal that Gutierrez had fathered a child with Sarah Lahbati, a boy whom they named Zion back in April 2013. He later confirmed the news on the first episode of It Takes Gutz to Be a Gutierrez, a reality TV program that revolves around his family's life. The show began airing in June 2014.

In 2017, Gutierrez signed a contract with ABS-CBN, and starred in the horror fantasy series La Luna Sangre as Sandrino, the main antagonist. He signed again an exclusive two-year contract with ABS-CBN on May 10, 2018 and became also a new Star Magic artist. He joined the cast of Ang Probinsyano as Lito Valmoria, another villain role in 2020. In 2022, he led his own series titled The Iron Heart.

=== Controversy ===
In 2009, Gutierrez was charged with reckless imprudence, arising from the death of his production assistant, Norman Pardo, who died in a car accident in May 2009. Gutierrez and Pardo were driving to Manila from Silang, Cavite. Gutierrez was injured, and Pardo, seated in the passenger seat, died on the spot.

In August 2012, the Court of Appeals reinstated the charge of reckless imprudence resulting in homicide after it granted a petition filed by Pardo's widow seeking the nullification of the two resolutions that had been issued by former justice secretaries Agnes Devanadera and Alberto Agra, respectively.

== Personal life ==
Gutierrez had several former relationships with celebrities. He was publicly dating actress Anne Curtis from 2003 to 2004, and had a long-distance relationship with model Georgina Wilson. He also previously dated Jewel Mische from 2007 to 2010.

In March 2020, Gutierrez married Sarah Lahbati in Taguig. They have two sons together, Zion (born 2013) and Kai (born 2018). Lahbati confirmed on March 1, 2024 that she and Gutierrez were separated since October 2023 but are coparenting their two young sons. In January 2025, Gutierrez said that they were seeking an annulment.

Three months after his separation from Lahbati, he began dating actress Barbie Imperial. The two had worked together in La Luna Sangre (2017) and Blood vs Duty (2026).

== Acting credits ==
=== Film ===
Key
†	Denotes films that have not yet been released

Richard Gutierrez's film credits with year of release, film titles and roles
Year	Title	Role	Ref.
1987	Lahing Pikutin	Richard	
1987	Takbo, Bilis... Takboooo!	Richard	
1988	Kambal Tuko	Kokoy	
1988	One Two Bato, Three Four Bapor	Richie	
1990	Juan Tanga, Super Naman, at ang Kambal na Tiyanak	Ting	
1990	Feel Na Feel	Richard	
1992	Takbo Talon Tili!	Tito	
2002	Bakit Papa	Dong	
2003	Mano Po 2	Erickson Tan†	
2004	Kuya	Ted	
2004	I Will Survive	B.J.	
2004	Sigaw	Marvin	
2005	Pinoy / Blonde	Template: N / A	
2005	Let the Love Begin	Eric	
2005	Mulawin: The Movie	Aguiluz†	
2006	I Will Always Love You	Justin	
2006	Mano Po 5: Gua Ai Di	Nathan	
2007	The Promise	Daniel	
2008	My Bestfriend's Girlfriend	Primitivo "Evo" Gonzales	
2008	My Monster Mom	Young Waldo	
2008	For the First Time	Seth Villaraza	
2009	When I Met U	Benjie	
2009	Patient X	Dr. Lukas Esguerra	
2010	In Your Eyes	Storm	
2011	My Valentine Girls	Arvin Perez / Oslec / Zach / Aidan	
2013	Seduction	Ram	
2013	My Lady Boss	Zach	
2014	Overtime	Dom Garcia	
2018	Fantastica	Prince Pryce	
2019	Unbreakable	Justin Saavedra	
2025	Shake, Rattle & Roll: Evil Origins	Rosdan	

=== Television ===
Key
†	Denotes shows that have not yet been aired

Richard Gutierrez's television credits with year of release, title(s) and role
Year	Title	Role	Ref.
2001–2003	Beh Bote Nga	Peter	
2001–2002	Ikaw Lang ang Mamahalin	Iñigo Zeñorosa	
2002–2003	Click	Enzo	
2002–2003	Habang Kapiling Ka	Basilio Malvarosa	
2003	Love to Love: Maid for Each Other	Ralph	
2003	Magpakailanman: Nang Mag-Abot Ang Langit At Lupa - The Annabelle Rama And Eddie Gutierrez Story	Eddie	
2003	Love to Love: My 1, 2 Love	JM Rodriguez / Tomas	
2004–2005	Mulawin	Aguiluz / Julian	
2005–2006	Sugo	Miguel / Amante	
2006–2007	Mars Ravelo's Captain Barbell	Potenciano "Teng" Magtanggol / Arell / Captain Barbell	
2007	Lupin	André Lupin de Dios	
2007–2008	Carlo J. Caparas' Kamandag	Vergel / Kamandag	
2008	Signos: Banta ng Nagbabagong Klima	Host	
2008	Full Force Nature	Host	
2008	Codename: Asero	Grecko Abesamis / Agent Phoenix / Asero	
2009	Planet Philippines	Host	
2009	Baha, Bahay, Buhay	Host	
2009	Zorro	Antonio Dela Cruz Peláez / Zorro	
2009–2010	Full House	Justin Lazatín	
2010	Anatomy of a Disaster	Host	
2010	Wildlife For Sale	Host	
2011	ORAS NA	Host	
2011	Mars Ravelo's Captain Barbell	Potenciano "Teng" Magtanggol / Arell / Captain Barbell	
2011	Spooky Nights Presents: KaLAbit	Miguel†	
2012	Pinoy Adventures	Host	
2012	Makapiling Kang Muli	Martin Caballero	
2012–2013	Extra Challenge Extreme	Host	
2013	Love & Lies	Edward Galvez	
2014	It Takes Gutz to Be a Gutierrez	Himself	
2016	Carlo J. Caparas' Ang Panday	Flavio	
2016	Carlo J. Caparas' Ang Panday	Panday	
2017	Mulawin vs. Ravena	Aguiluz (flashback)	
2017	La Luna Sangre	Sandrino "Supremo" Villalobo†	
2017	La Luna Sangre	Gilbert Imperial†	
2019	Maalaala Mo Kaya: Hot Choco	Hertito "Tito" Monzon	
2020–2022	FPJ's Ang Probinsyano	Angelito "Lito" Valmoria†	
2022–2023	The Iron Heart	Apollo "Pol" Adelantar	
2022–2023	The Iron Heart	Olimpio "Tisoy" Custodio	
2022–2023	The Iron Heart	Aries dela Torre	
2025	Incognito	Jose "JB" Bonifacio	
2025	Incognito	Shark	
2026	Blood vs Duty	Marcus Reyes	

=== Music video appearances ===
Year	Title	Artist	Note	Ref.
2026	"Unang Kilig"	Bini	with Gerald Anderson	

== Accolades ==
Golden Screen TV Awards

- 2011: Outstanding Adapted Reality Competition Program Host Nominee for Survivor Philippines: Celebrity Edition
- 2011: Outstanding Natural History/Wildlife Program Host Nominee for Anatomy of a Disaster
- 2013: Outstanding Adapted Reality/Competition Program Host Nominee for Survivor Philippines: Double Celebrity Showdown
- 2013: Outstanding Natural History/Wildlife Program Host Nominee for Oras Na

UPLB Gandingan Awards

- 2011: Gandingan ng Edukasyon Special Citation

PMPC Star Awards for Television

- 2012: Best Lifestyle/Travel Show Host Winner for Pinoy Adventures
- 2013: Best Reality Competition Program Host Pending Nominee for Extra Challenge

FAMAS Awards

- 1988: Best Child Actor Nomination for Takbo, bilis... takboooo!
- 2009: Best Actor Nomination for For the First Time
- 2015: Face of the Night with Toni Gonzaga

German Moreno Youth Achievement Award

- 2004: German Moreno Youth Achievement Award Awardee

GMMSF Box-Office Entertainment Awards

- 2003 Guillermo Mendoza Memorial Scholarship Foundation: Most Promising Male Actor
- 2004 Guillermo Mendoza Memorial Scholarship Foundation: Prince of RP Movies
- 2006 Guillermo Mendoza Memorial Scholarship Foundation: Prince of Philippine Movies & TV (for Let the Love Begin)
- 2008: Prince of Philippine Movies (for The Promise) and King of Valentine Movies
- 2009: Valentine Box-Office King Winner (with Marian Rivera) for My Best Friend's Girlfriend and Prince of Philippine Movies & TV for For the First Time
