= Eddie Gutierrez =

Filipino actor (born 1942)

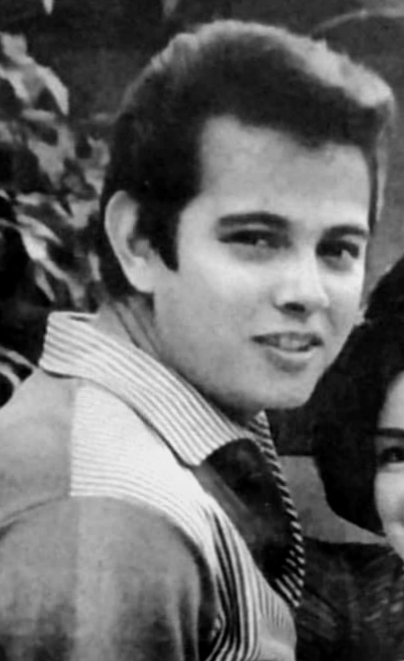
- Gutierrez in 1966
- Born: Jorge Eduardo Gutiérrez y Pickett; February 6, 1942 (age 84); Ermita, Manila, Philippine Commonwealth
- Other names: Eddie, J.E.G.
- Citizenship: American, Spanish, Filipino
- Occupation: Actor
- Years active: 1953–present
- Political party: Liberal (1995)
- Spouse: Annabelle Rama (m. 1980)
- Partner(s): Liza Lorena (1963–1968; separated); Pilita Corrales (1968–1971; separated)
- Children: 8, including Tonton, Ruffa, Ramon Christopher, Richard and Raymond
- Parent(s): Antonio Atayde Gutierrez Jr. Mary Rufina Herranz Pickett
- Relatives: Gutierrez family

Jorge Eduardo "Eddie" Pickett Gutiérrez (born February 6, 1942) is a Filipino actor and former matinee idol.

== Personal life ==
Gutierrez married actress Annabelle Rama on November 8, 1980, with whom he has six children: Ruffa, Rocky, Elvis, Richard, Raymond and Ritchie Paul. Annabelle serves as the talent manager for their children who are in the entertainment industry.

He also has two children from previous relationships: Tonton Gutierrez with actress Liza Lorena in 1968, and Ramon Christopher "Monching" Gutierrez in 1971 with singer Pilita Corrales, also known as "Asia's Queen of Songs"; through Monching, he and Corrales are the grandparents of actress Janine Gutierrez.

In 1995, he entered the politics as he ran for congressman of the lone district of Parañaque but lost to Roilo Golez.

== Career ==
A bit player in Prinsesang Gusgusin (1958), Gutierrez was introduced in Handsome (1959) and played the lead in films like Kaming Makasalanan (1960), Eddie Longlegs (1964), Portrait of My Love (1965) and Pogi (1967). He was under contract for Sampaguita Pictures for eight years. His other films include Hiram na Kamay (1962), June Bride (1962), Pitong puso (1962), Sabina (1963), Bird of Paradise (1963), Eddie Loves Susie (1964), Isinulat sa Dugo (1965), I'll Dream of You (1966), and All Over the World (1967).

After living in the United States for several years, he came back to the Philippines with his family and resumed his acting career. He appeared in Katawang lupa (1975), Ursula (1976), Beerhouse (1977), Bontoc (1977), Balatkayo (1978), Bomba Star (1980), Sari-saring ibong kulasisi (1978), Lagi na lamang ba akong babae? (1978), and Lumakad Ka, Gabi (1979).

In 1991, he was nominated Best Supporting Actor by the Film Academy of the Philippines (FAP) for Uubusin ko ang lahi mo (1991). He received the FAP award for Best Actor and the Filipino Academy of Movie Arts & Sciences (FAMAS) for Best Supporting Actor for Ikaw pa lang ang minahal (1992).

In 2004 and 2006, Gutiérrez joined the cast of the TV fantasy series, Mulawin and Majika in both series playing an elder with magical powers.

== Filmography ==
=== Film ===
Year	Title	Role
1955	Batas ng Alipin	
1959	Handsome	
1959	Ipinagbili Kami ng Aming Tatay	
1959	Pitong Pagsisisi	
1959	Wedding Bells	Mike (segment "Pagmamanhikan")
1960	Dobol Trobol	
1960	Kwintas ng Alaala	
1960	Beatnik	
1960	Estela Mondragon	
1960	Ginang Hukom	Kyle (segment "Ama at anak")
1961	Dalawang Kalbaryo ni Dr. Mendez	
1961	Joey, Eddie, Lito	Eddie
1961	Octavia	
1962	Pitong Puso	
1962	Susanang Daldal	
1962	The Big Broadcast	Eddie
1962	Tanzan the Mighty	
1962	June Bride	
1962	Siyam na Langit	
1963	Bird of Paradise	
1963	Sabina	Eddie
1963	Apat ang Anak ni David	
1963	Eddie Loves Susie	
1963	Amaliang Mali-Mali vs. Susanang Daldal	Daldal's companion
1964	Fighting Warays sa Ilokos	
1964	Walang Takot sa Patalim	
1964	Jukebox Jamboree	
1964	Leron Leron Sinta	
1964	Magkapatid na Waray	
1964	Mga Kanyon sa Corregidor	
1964	Hi-Sosayti	
1965	Portrait of My Love	
1965	Bye Bye na Daddy	
1965	Hamon sa Kampeon	
1965	Ang Maganda Kong Kapitbahay	
1965	Isinulat na Dugo	
1966	Alis D'yan Huwag Mo Akong Ligawan	
1966	Walastik na Downtown	
1966	Sexy Yata 'Yan	
1967	Ang Pangarap Ko'y Ikaw	Chito/Rene
1967	Pogi	
1967	All Over the World	
1967	Bikini Beach Party	
1967	Anong Ganda Mo!	
1968	To Love Again	
1968	Buy One Take One	
1968	Doon Po sa Amin	
1968	Summer Love	
1968	Tiririt ng Maya, Tiririt ng Ibon	
1968	Ngitngit ng Pitong Whistle Bomb	Herman
1969	Brownout	
1969	Let's Dance the Horsey-Horse	
1970	Ako'y Tao, May Dugo at Laman!	Mario
1970	Bulaklak at Paru-Paro	
1970	Heredera	
1970	Ganid sa Laman	
1970	Sino ang Reyna?	
1971	Adios Mi Amor	
1971	Europe Here We Come!	
1971	Francisca at Isabel	
1971	Liezl at Ang 7 Hoods	
1971	Divina Bastarda	
1971	Sa Pagsikat ng Araw	
1972	Huwag Mong Angkinin ang Asawa Ko!	
1972	The Sisters	
1973	Bakit May Bilanggo Sa Anak ni Eba?	
1973	Sandra Lee	
1973	Father Jess	
1973	Karnabal	Karnabal Patron
1973	Savage!	Flores
1974	Pula, Puti at Bughaw	
1974	El Negro	
1975	Bakit May Bilanggo sa Anak ni Eva	
1975	Babae Hindi Ka Dapat Nilalang	
1975	An Affair in Tahiti	
1975	Katawang Lupa	
1975	T.L. Ako Sa Iyo	
1975	Ang Kailangan Ngayon ng Daigdig ay Pag-Ibig	
1975	Silakbo	
1976	Ursula	
1976	The College Girls	
1976	Divorce Pilipino Style	
1976	Puwede Ako, Puwede Ka Pa Ba?	
1977	Babae!	
1977	Beerhouse	Jose Mari
1977	Bontoc	
1977	Pang Adults Lamang	
1977	Babae, Huwag Kang Tukso	
1977	Dalagang Ina	
1978	Maiinit na Labi, Nag-aapoy na Dibdib	
1978	Basta Kabit, May Sabit	
1978	Marupok, Mapusok, Maharot	
1978	Sari-Saring Ibong Kulasisi	Robert Rivero
1978	Promo Girl	
1978	Balat Kayo	
1978	Lagi na Lamang Ba Akong Babae?	Donato
1979	Mabango Ba ang Bawat Bulaklak	
1979	Lumakad Ka, Gabi	
1982	Katawang Isinumpa	
1986	Inday Inday sa Balitaw	Danny
1986	Payaso	
1987	Remember Me, Mama	
1987	Mga Lahing Pikutin	
1987	Asawa Ko Huwag Mong Agawin	Bert Paredes
1987	Paano Kung Wala Ka Na?	Raffy
1987	1 + 1 = 12 (+ 1): One Plus One Equals Twelve (Cheaper by the Dozen)	
1988	Love Boat: Mahal Trip Kita	Capt. Rocky Madrigal
1988	Kambal Tuko	Andoy
1989	My Pretty Baby	Melanio
1989	Here Comes the Bride	Nando
1989	Ang Babaeng Nawawala sa Sarili	Garrido Decena
1990	Tora Tora, Bang Bang Bang	
1990	Feel Na Feel	
1990	Island of Desire	Molly's father
1990	Shake, Rattle & Roll II	Dr. Corpus (segment "Multo")
1991	Una Kang Naging Akin	Dr. Mallari
1991	Itakwil Man Ako ng Langit	
1991	Uubusin Ko ang Lahi Mo	
1991	Humanap Ka ng Panget	Ernesto
1991	Kailan Ka Magiging Akin	Jaime
1991	Andrew Ford Medina: Wag Kang Gamol!	Ernesto
1991	Kumukulong Dugo	Moreno
1991	Buburahin Kita sa Mundo!	
1992	Iisa Pa Lamang	Ramon
1992	Ikaw Pa Lang ang Minahal	Maximo
1992	Cornelia Ramos Story	
1992	Magdaleno Orbos: Sa Kuko ng Mga Lawin	Mr. Alingcastre
1992	Pat. Omar Abdullah: Pulis Probinsiya	Cong. Angelo Ampil
1992	Daddy Goon	
1992	Angelina: The Movie	
1992	Andres Manambit: Angkan ng Matatapang	Mayor Rafael de Jesus
1993	Sana Ay Ikaw Na Nga	
1993	Makuha Ka sa Tingin	Don Ricardo
1993	Kailangan Kita	Conrad
1993	Secret Love	Ronald
1993	Home Along da Riles (The Movie)	Governor Quiogue
1993	Doring Dorobo	Col. Cervantez
1994	The Untold Story: Vizconde Massacre II – May the Lord Be with Us	
1994	Ismael Zacarias	Don Pablo
1995	Di Mapigil ang Init	
1996	Leon Cordero: Duwag Lang ang Hahalik sa Lupa!	Don Salazar
1996	Duwelo	
1996	Suicide Rangers	James Costales
1996	Utol	Don Jose
1997	SIG .357: Baril Mo ang Papatay sa Iyo	Nico
1997	Kasangga Mo Ako sa Huling Laban	Cong. Villalobos
1997	Kamandag Ko ang Papatay sa Iyo	Congressman Soler
1997	Isinakdal Ko ang Aking Ina	Daniel
1997	Padre Kalibre	
1997	Mananayaw	
1998	Kahit Pader Gigibain Ko!	Sen. Madrigal
1998	Pakawalang Puso	
1998	Sige, Subukan Mo	Mayor Canor Manalo
1999	Mister Mo, Lover Ko	Ford Punongbayan
1999	Bilib Ako Sa'yo	General
1999	Akin ang Labang Ito	
2002	Bro... Kahit Saan Engkwentro	Simon Ovarte a.k.a. Ang Patron
2002	Eva Lason Kay Adan	
2002	Hanggang Kailan Ako Papatay Para Mabuhay?	
2002	Dalaginding	
2002	Home Alone da Riber	Sam
2003	Hiram	Ramon Cortez
2005	Pony Trouble	
2005	Pelukang Itim: Agimat Ko Ito for Victory Again	
2005	La Visa Loca	Lex Halcon
2005	Mulawin: The Movie	Dakila
2008	My Monster Mom	Waldo
2008	For the First Time	Hector Villaraza
2015	Etiquette for Mistresses	Gabriel Castronuevo
2015	Felix Manalo	Pastor Victoriano Manalo

=== Television/digital series ===
Year	Title	Role	Notes
1993	Maalaala Mo Kaya	Lolo Dong	Episode Guest: "Limos"
2001	Ikaw Lang ang Mamahalin	Tony Madrigal	
2001	Kung Mawawala Ka	Tomas Locsin	
2003	Love to Love	Don Ramon	
2004	Mulawin	Dakila	
2005	Encantadia	Dakila	
2006	Majika	Balkan	
2007	Dalawang Tisoy	Pocholo	
2007	Mga Kuwento Ni Lola Basyang	Haring Enrico	Episode Guest: "Kampanerang Kuba"
2007	Sine Novela: Pati Ba Pintig ng Puso?	Don Griego	
2008	Maalaala Mo Kaya: Basura	Lolo Dong	
2009	Zorro	Luis Aragon	
2009	Sana Ngayong Pasko	Ernesto Dionisio	
2010–2011	My Driver Sweet Lover	Lolo George	
2011	Mars Ravelo's Captain Barbell	Armando Chavez	
2011	100 Days to Heaven	Anton Salvador	
2012	Walang Hanggan	Joseph Montenegro	
2012–2013	Ina, Kapatid, Anak	Lucas Elizalde	
2014	It Takes Gutz to Be a Gutierrez	Himself	
2015	My Fair Lady	Matteo Tuiseco	
2016	Kalyeserye	Anselmo / Lola's Playlist Guest Judge	
2016	The Story of Us	Luis Cristobal	
2016	FPJ's Ang Probinsyano	Rodolfo Recto	
2018	Cain at Abel	Antonio Larrazabal	
2019	The Killer Bride	Jacobo Dela Torre	
2020	Make It with You	Aga Dimaguiba	
2023–2024	Black Rider	Don Alejandro Esteban-Valmoria	Supporting Cast / Antagonist
2025	Incognito	Gen. Antonio "Tony" Bonifacio	
