= Tonton Gutierrez =

Filipino actor (born 1968)

- Born: Eduardo Antonio Winsett Gutierrez, Jr. March 20, 1968 (age 58); Manila, Philippines
- Other name: Tonton
- Occupations: Television and film actor
- Years active: 1983–present
- Spouse: Glydel Mercado (m. 2004)
- Children: 2
- Parent(s): Eddie Gutierrez; Liza Lorena
- Relatives: Gutierrez family

Eduardo Antonio "Tonton" Winsett Gutierrez, Jr. (born March 20, 1968) is a Filipino film and television actor best known for his role as Governor Eduardo Buenavista in the original hit teleserye Pangako Sa 'Yo, it was topbilled by Kristine Hermosa, Jericho Rosales, Eula Valdez and Jean Garcia.

He was introduced in Viva Films' Sana'y Wala ng Wakas (1986) as Sharon Cuneta's leading man and became the film outfit's exclusive contract star. He starred in Viva Films movies -- Nakagapos na Puso (1986), Kung Aagawin mo ang lahat sa Akin (1987); Pasan Ko ang Daigdig (1987), Alabok sa Ulap (1987) and Saan Nagtatago ang Pag-ibig? (1987) as Val, the retardate husband of Estela played by Vilma Santos. From the aforementioned movie, he received best actor trophies from Catholic Mass Media Awards (CMMA), PMPC's Star Awards and Film Academy of the Philippines (FAP) in 1987. In 1996, he was awarded best actor by the Gawad Urian for Reyna Films' Abot Kamay ang Pangarap.

== Early life ==
Eduardo Antonio Winsett Gutierrez, Jr. is the son of Eddie Gutierrez and actress Liza Lorena. His parents did not marry and eventually separated after he was born. Ramon Christopher Gutierrez is his half-brother from his father's second relationship with actress Pilita Corrales. Ruffa Gutierrez, Rocky Gutierrez, Elvis Gutierrez, Richard and Raymond Gutierrez, and Ritchie Paul Gutierrez are his half siblings from his father's marriage to Annabelle Rama.

== Personal life ==
Tonton Gutierrez is married to actress Glydel Mercado on March 15, 2004, at the Sanctuario de San Antonio Parish, Forbes Park, Makati. Together they have two daughters. He is of American descent on both his father and mother's side.

== Filmography ==
=== Film ===
Year	Title	Role
1986	Captain Barbell	Al / Aswang
1986	Sana'y Wala Nang Wakas	Teddy Tuazon
1986	Nakagapos na Puso	Levi F. Lino
1987	Kung Aagawin Mo ang Lahat sa Akin	Troy Samaniego
1987	Alabok sa Ulap	Dom Romero
1987	Saan Nagtatago ang Pag-Ibig?	Val
1987	Pablo S. Gomez' Pasan Ko ang Daigdig	Carding
1988	Jack N' Jill sa Amerika	Danny
1989	3 Mukha ng Pag-ibig (segment: I Love You, Moo-Moo)	Ramon
1989	Bakit Iisa Lamang ang Puso?	Teddy
1989	Kahit Wala Ka Na	Bonnie
1989	Kung Kasalanan Man	Dan Ramirez
1989	Abot Hanggang Sukdulan	Joe Mari
1989	Ang Babaeng Nawawala sa Sarili	Loren Decena
1990	Pangarap Na Ginto	Glenn
1991	Kaputol ng Isang Awit	Erick Valderama
1991	Darna	George
1991	Sa Kabila ng Lahat	Mike Serrano
1992	Akin ang Pangarap Mo	Myron Castillo
1993	Ang Boyfriend Kong Gamol	Michael
1993	Sa Isang Sulok ng mga Pangarap	Errol
1994	Oo Na, Sige Na	Ernie
1994	Forever	Albert
1994	Kapantay Ay Langit	Frank
1994	Sana Dalawa ang Puso Ko	Dan
1995	Basa sa Dagat	Leandro
1995	Dahas	Eric
1995	Saan Ako Nagkamali	Rey
1995	Muntik Nang Maabot ang Langit	Ben
1995	Patayin sa Sindak si Barbara	Nick Duarte
1995	Sambahin Mo ang Katawan Ko	
1995	Kandungan	Monchito
1996	Sariwang Bulaklak	Lt. Borja
1996	Kristo	Lazarus
1996	Nananabik... sa 'Yong Pagbabalik	
1996	Virgin People	Isaac
1996	SPO4 Santiago: Sharpshooter	Boy Palomar
1996	To Saudi with Love	Alan
1996	Isla (The Young Version)	
1996	Abot-Kamay ang Pangarap	Roy
1996	'Wag na 'Wag Kang Lalayo	Lawrence
1997	Shake, Rattle & Roll VI	Manrey
1997	Lihim ni Madonna	Photographer
1997	Kriselda, Sabik sa 'Yo	
1997	Ang Ambisyosa	Arvin
1997	May Gatas Ka Pa sa Labi	Jim
1997	Sambahin ang Puri Ko	
1997	Kahit Minsan Lang	Baldo
1997	Kahit Hindi Turuan ang Puso	Dick Caringal
1997	Bubot, Kulang sa Panahon	Romano
1998	Kid Manalo, Akin ang Ulo Mo!	Johnny
1998	Balasubas	
1998	May Sayad	Richard
1998	Gagawin Ko ang Lahat	
1998	Tatlo... Magkasalo	Tito
1998	Armadong Hudas	Jerry Lavares
1999	Maldita	Matthew
1999	Gamu-Gamong Dagat	Rolez
1999	Alyas Pogi: Ang Pagbabalik	Mayor Villegas
1999	Laging Sariwa ang Sugat	Edward
2000	Baliktaran	Ariel Canlas
2001	Apoy sa Karagatan	Michael
2001	Marital Rape	Mon
2002	Sana Totoo Na	Mayor Dondi Sarmiento
2002	Buko Pandan	Louie
2003	Magnifico	Ka Romy
2003	Ang Tanging Ina	Alfredo B. Monteagudo
2004	So Happy Together	Kerwin Espinosa
2005	Let the Love Begin	Jake
2005	Say That You Love Me	Raman
2007	Sa Harap ng Panganib	Lt. Raul Gomez
2007	Shake, Rattle and Roll 9	Chuck
2008	Loving You	Virgilio
2009	When I Met U	Manny
2010	Hating Kapatid	Rica and Cecil's father
2010	Rosario	Party guest
2010	Ang Tanging Ina Mo (Last na 'To!)	Joe
2011	Way Back Home	Ariel Santiago
2012	Born to Love You	Rex's dad
2013	Bakit Hindi Ka Crush ng Crush Mo?	Miguel Prieto
2013	Boy Golden	Col. Rey Maristela
2015	Just the Way You Are	Theodore Sison
2015	The Love Affair	Greg
2015	Felix Manalo	Benjamin Santiago
2016	Camp Sawi	Miguel
2018	My Perfect You	Roel Toledo
2019	Maledicto	
2019	Mission Unstapabol: The Don Identity	Arthur Mendez
2021	Princess DayaReese	Rommel dela Cuesta
2025	Mudrasta: Ang Beking Ina!	Enrique Santillanes
2025	I'mPerfect	Dan
2027	The Last Resort	

- Jack N' Jill (1987) - Danny
- Kung Aagawin (1987)
- Kahit Wala Ka Na (1989)
- Tiny Terrestrial: The Three Professors (1990)
- Sa Kabila ng Lahat (1991)
- Kaputol ng Isang Awit (1991)
- Paniwalaan Mo (1993)
- Syota ng Bayan (1994)
- Muntik Nang Maabot ang Langit (1995)
- Lahar: Paraisong Abo (1997)
- Manananggal in Manila (1997) – Desidek
- Tuloy... Bukas ang Pinto (1998)
- My Guardian Debil (1998)
- Shirley (1998)
- Serafin Geronimo: Ang Kriminal ng Bo. Concepcion (1998) – Sarge
- Fidel Jimenez: Magkakasubukan Tayo (2000) – Col. Cadiz
- Ooops, Teka Lang... Diskarte Ko 'To! (2001) – Johnny Estrella
- Hayop sa Sex Appeal (2001)
- Di Kita Ma-reach (2001)
- Cass & Carry: Who Wants to Be a Billionaire? (2002) – Mr. Roma
- Forever My Love (2004) – Jimmy
- I Will Survive (2004) – Manolo

=== Television ===
Year	Title	Role
1989	Palibhasa Lalake	Boni (30/05/89 episode guest)
1997–1999	Del Tierro	Juancho
1999	Maalaala Mo Kaya: Pulot-Gata	
2000	Umaga, Tanghali, Gabi	
2000–2002	Pangako sa 'Yo	Eduardo Buenavista
2001	Larawan	
2002–2003	Habang Kapiling Ka	Marius Malvarosa / Xandro / Kenji Ogata
2004	Te Amo, Maging Sino Ka Man	Minong Salvaderas
2004–2005	Forever in My Heart	Ronald Carbonel
2005	Love to Love: Struck in Love	
2005	Love to Love: Wishing Upon a Jar	
2005	Magpakailanman: The Manny and Pie Calayan Story	Manny Calayan
2005	Mars Ravelo's Darna	Mulong / Nosferamous
2005–2006	Etheria: Ang Ikalimang Kaharian ng Encantadia	Memen
2006	Komiks Presents: Da Adventures of Pedro Penduko	Erning
2006	Bituing Walang Ningning	Emilio Suarez
2007	Nagmamahal, Kapamilya: Rene-Louisa	Rene
2007	Sana Maulit Muli	George Soriano
2007	Mga Mata ni Anghelita	Mayor Carlos / Solcar
2007–2008	Mars Ravelo's Lastikman	Irroian
2008	Babangon Ako't Dudurugin Kita	Jango San Juan
2008	Maalaala Mo Kaya: Salamin	Jun
2009	May Bukas Pa	Mario Sta. Maria
2009	Maalaala Mo Kaya: Isda	Manuel "Manny" Villar
2009	Maalaala Mo Kaya: Bangka	Manuel "Manny" Villar
2010	Maalaala Mo Kaya: Shell	Jun
2010	Langit sa Piling Mo	Stanley Tee
2011	Sabel	Julio De Dios
2011	Minsan Lang Kita Iibigin	Tomas "Bernabe" Sta. Maria
2011–2012	Glamorosa	Giorgio Lustico
2012–2013	Aryana	Victor Mendez
2013	Maalaala Mo Kaya: Sanggol	Fernando Poe Jr.
2013	Juan dela Cruz	Haring Manaon
2013	Bukas na Lang Kita Mamahalin	Richard Ramirez
2014	Sana Bukas pa ang Kahapon	Carlos Syquia / Señor Muerte
2015	Maalaala Mo Kaya: Mangga at Bagoong	Ruben
2015	Maalaala Mo Kaya: Medical Record	Lito De Guzman
2015–2016	You're My Home	Victor Vergara
2015–2016	And I Love You So	Alfonso Valdez
2016	That's My Amboy	Albert Romero
2016	FPJ's Ang Probinsyano	SPO4 Pablo B. De Leon
2016–2017	The Greatest Love	Zosimo Guerrero
2017	Maalaala Mo Kaya: Rehab Center	Pio
2017	Daig Kayo ng Lola Ko	Pitong
2017	Magpakailanman: Boobay	Noel
2017	The Promise of Forever	Marlon Borja
2018	Sherlock Jr.	Lawrence Carazo
2018	Magpakailanman: Anak Sa Kasinungalingan	Tatay Junior
2018–2019	Ika-5 Utos	Emilio "Emil" Buenaventura Sr.
2019	Magpakailanman: Bata Bata, Kriminal O Biktima?	Ben
2019–2020	One of the Baes	Francis Aragoza
2020–2021	Walang Hanggang Paalam	Leonardo "Leo" Chavez
2020–2021	Ate ng Ate Ko	Alberto Toledo
2021	Tadhana: Senior Love	Mario
2021	Magpakailanman: I Will Survive	Eddie
2022	False Positive	Rodrigo "RDG" Dela Guardia
2022	Tadhana: Heredera	Emman
2022	Love You Stranger	Alfonso "Alfie" Dela Paz
2023	Hearts on Ice	Gerald Campos
2023	Maging Sino Ka Man	Georgino "George" Santos
2024	Abot-Kamay na Pangarap	Eric Refuerzo
2024–2025	Widows' War	Galvan Palacios
2025	Akusada	Ammar
2025	Sins of the Father	Joseph Garcia
2026	The Master Cutter	Dmitri Regalia
2026	Honor Thy Mother	Martin Dela Cruz
