= List of Philippine films of 2011 =

This is an incomplete list of Filipino full-length films, both mainstream and independently produced, released in theaters and cinemas in 2011.

== Top ten grossing films ==
Rank	Film	Production outfit	Domestic gross^{1}	Source
1.	The Unkabogable Praybeyt Benjamin	Star Cinema, Viva Films	₱ 331,631,283	
2.	No Other Woman	Star Cinema, Viva Films	₱ 278,418,883	
3.	Enteng ng Ina Mo	Star Cinema, M-Zet Productions, OctoArts Films, APT Entertainment	₱ 260,088,780	
4.	Segunda Mano	Star Cinema, AgostoDos Pictures, MJM Productions	₱ 135,120,562	
5.	Catch Me... I'm in Love	Star Cinema, Viva Films	₱ 120,214,951	
6.	In the Name of Love	Star Cinema	₱ 117,229,891	
7.	Ang Panday 2	GMA Films, Imus Productions	₱ 105,603,500	
8.	Won't Last a Day Without You	Star Cinema, Viva Films	₱ 87,016,789	
9.	Pak! Pak! My Dr. Kwak!	M-Zet Productions, APT Entertainment, OctoArts Films, Star Cinema	₱ 77,150,981	
10.	Bulong	Star Cinema	₱ 67,269,330	

Note

1. Box Office Mojo, a reliable third party box office revenue tracker, does not track any revenues earned during any Metro Manila Film Festival editions. So the official figures by film entries during the festival are only estimates taken from any recent updates from credible and reliable sources such as a film's production outfit, or from any news agencies. To verify the figures, see individual sources for the references.

Color key

- – a Metro Manila Film Festival entry film

== Films ==
Title	Director	Cast	Genre	Release date	Studio
The Adventures of Pureza: Queen of the Riles	Soxie H. Topacio	Melai Cantiveros, Jason Francisco, Martin del Rosario, Bianca Manalo, Joem Bascon	Comedy	July 13	Sine Screen, Star Cinema
Amigo	John Sayles	Joel Torre, Chris Cooper	Drama	July 6	Variance Films
Ang Panday 2	Mac Alejandre	Bong Revilla, Phillip Salvador, Marian Rivera, Iza Calzado, Rhian Ramos, Eddie Garcia	Action, fantasy-adventure	December 25	GMA Films, Imus Productions
Bulong	Chito S. Roño	Vhong Navarro, Angelica Panganiban	Horror, comedy	February 2	Star Cinema
Catch Me... I'm in Love	Mae Czarina Cruz	Sarah Geronimo, Gerald Anderson	Romance, drama	March 23	Star Cinema, VIVA Films
Enteng ng Ina Mo!	Tony Y. Reyes	Vic Sotto, Ai-Ai delas Alas	Action, fantasy-adventure, comedy, drama	December 25	Star Cinema, OctoArts Films, M-Zet TV Productions Inc., APT Entertainment
Forever and a Day	Cathy Garcia-Molina	KC Concepcion, Sam Milby	Drama, romance	June 15	Star Cinema
Ikaw ang Pag-ibig	Marilou Diaz-Abaya	Marvin Agustin, Jomari Yllana, Ina Feleo	Religious drama	September 14	Archdiocese of Caceres, Marilou Diaz-Abaya Film Institute and Arts Center
In the Name of Love	Olivia Lamasan	Angel Locsin, Aga Muhlach, Jake Cuenca	Drama, romance	May 11	Star Cinema
Joey Gosiengfiao's Temptation Island	Chris Martinez	Marian Rivera, Heart Evangelista, Lovi Poe, Solenn Heussaff	Comedy	July 6	GMA Films, Regal Entertainment
Ligo Na Ü, Lapit Na Me	Erick Salud	Edgar Allan Guzman, Mercedes Cabral	Comedy, drama	July 18	Cinemalaya, Noel Ferrer Productions
Manila Kingpin: The Asiong Salonga Story	Tikoy Aguiluz; Gary dela Cruz	George "E.R" Estregan, Carla Abellana	Crime, drama	December 25	Scenema Concept International, VIVA Films
My House Husband: Ikaw Na!	Jose Javier Reyes	Judy Ann Santos, Ryan Agoncillo, Eugene Domingo	Comedy, drama	December 25	
My Neighbor's Wife	Jun Lana	Dennis Trillo, Lovi Poe, Carla Abellana, Jake Cuenca	Drama	September 14	Regal Entertainment
My Valentine Girls	Dominic Zapata, Andoy Ranay & Chris Martinez	Richard Gutierrez, Rhian Ramos, Lovi Poe, Solenn Heussaff, Eugene Domingo, Jillian Ward	Romance, comedy	February 9	GMA Films, Regal Entertainment
No Other Woman	Ruel S. Bayani	Anne Curtis, Cristine Reyes, Derek Ramsay	Drama, romance, thriller	September 28	Star Cinema, VIVA Films
Pak! Pak! My Dr. Kwak!	Tony Y. Reyes	Vic Sotto, Bea Alonzo, Zaijan Jaranilla, Xyriel Manabat, Pokwang, Wally Bayola, Jose Manalo	Fantasy comedy	April 23	Star Cinema, OctoArts Films, M-Zet TV Productions Inc., APT Entertainment
The Unkabogable Praybeyt Benjamin	Wenn V. Deramas	Vice Ganda, Derek Ramsay	Comedy, action, fantasy	October 26	Star Cinema, VIVA Films
Rakenrol	Quark Henares	Jason Abalos, Glaiza de Castro	Comedy	September 21	
The Road	Yam Laranas	Rhian Ramos, Carmina Villarroel, Marvin Agustin, TJ Trinidad	Horror, thriller	November 30	GMA Films
Ang Sayaw ng Dalawang Kaliwang Paa	Alvin Yapan	Paulo Avelino, Rocco Nacino	Drama	October 26	
Segunda Mano	Joyce Bernal	Kris Aquino, Angelica Panganiban, Dingdong Dantes	Horror, suspense	December 25	Star Cinema, AgostoDos Pictures, MJM Productions, Inc.
Shake, Rattle & Roll 13	Chris Martinez, Richard Somes, Jerrold Tarog	Maricar Reyes, Bugoy Cariño, Zanjoe Marudo, Kathryn Bernardo, Louise delos Reyes, Eugene Domingo	Horror	December 25	Regal Entertainment
Thelma	Paul Soriano	Maja Salvador	Drama	September 7	TimeHorizon Pictures, Abracadabra, Underground Logic
Third World Happy	EJ Salcedo	Sam Milby, Jodi Sta. Maria	Drama	May 25	Cinema One Originals
Tum: My Pledge of Love	Robin Padilla	Robin Padilla, Mariel Rodriguez	Drama	April 6	Liwanag ng Kapayapaan Foundation Philippines, R.R. Foundation India
Tween Academy: Class of 2012	Mark A. Reyes	Elmo Magalona, Barbie Forteza, Bea Binene	Drama	August 24	GMA Films, SMDC
Tumbok	Topel Lee	Cristine Reyes, Carlo Aquino	Horror	May 4	VIVA Films
Way Back Home	Jerry Lopez Sineneng	Kathryn Bernardo, Julia Montes	Drama	August 17	Star Cinema
Wedding Tayo, Wedding Hindi	Jose Javier Reyes	Toni Gonzaga, Eugene Domingo, Zanjoe Marudo, Wendell Ramos	Comedy	August 31	Star Cinema, OctoArts Films
Who's That Girl	Wenn V. Deramas	Luis Manzano, Anne Curtis, Eugene Domingo	Romance, comedy	March 2	VIVA Films
The Woman in the Septic Tank	Marlon Rivera	Eugene Domingo	Comedy	July 15	Cinemalaya, Martinez Rivera Films, Quantum Films, Straight Shooters Media, Inc.
Won't Last A Day Without You	Raz Dela Torre	Sarah Geronimo, Gerald Anderson	Romance, comedy	November 30	Star Cinema, VIVA Films
Yesterday, Today, Tomorrow	Jun Lana	Maricel Soriano, Gabby Concepcion, Jericho Rosales, Dennis Trillo, Lovi Poe, Carla Abellana, Paulo Avelino, Solenn Heussaff, Ronaldo Valdez, Agot Isidro, Eula Caballero	Drama	December 25	Regal Entertainment
Zombadings 1: Patayin sa Shokot si Remington	Jade Castro	Lauren Young, Martin Escudero	Horror, comedy	August 31	Origin8Media

== Awards ceremonies ==
These awards were given in 2012 for the films released in 2011.

Award ceremony	Best Picture	Best Director	Best Actor	Best Actress	Best Supporting Actor	Best Supporting Actress	Best Screenplay	Ref.
60th FAMAS Awards	Manila Kingpin: The Asiong Salonga Story	Tikoy Aguiluz; Manila Kingpin: The Asiong Salonga Story	Jeorge Estregan; Manila Kingpin: The Asiong Salonga Story	Anne Curtis; No Other Woman	Baron Geisler; Manila Kingpin: The Asiong Salonga Story	Angelica Panganiban; Segunda Mano	Roy Iglesias and Rey Ventura; Manila Kingpin: The Asiong Salonga Story	
35th Gawad Urian Awards	Ang Sayaw ng Dalawang Kaliwang Paa	Alvin Yapan; Ang Sayaw ng Dalawang Kaliwang Paa	Paulo Avelino; Ang Sayaw ng Dalawang Kaliwang Paa	Maja Salvador; Thelma	Art Acuña; Niño	Jean Garcia; Ang Sayaw ng Dalawang Kaliwang Paa	Alvin Yapan; Ang Sayaw ng Dalawang Kaliwang Paa	
30th Luna Awards	Manila Kingpin: The Asiong Salonga Story	Paul Soriano; Thelma	Jeorge Estregan; Manila Kingpin: The Asiong Salonga Story	Maja Salvador; Thelma	John Regala; Manila Kingpin: The Asiong Salonga Story	Lovi Poe; Yesterday, Today, Tomorrow	Froilan Medina and Paul Soriano; Thelma	
28th Star Awards	Manila Kingpin: The Asiong Salonga Story (Studio); Thelma (Indie)	Darryl dela Cruz Manila Kingpin: The Asiong Salonga Story (Studio); Paul Soriano Thelma (Indie)	Jeorge Estregan Manila Kingpin: The Asiong Salonga Story; Aga Muhlach In the Name of Love	Angel Locsin; In the Name of Love	Jake Cuenca In the Name of Love; Baron Geisler Manila Kingpin: The Asiong Salonga Story	Lovi Poe; Yesterday, Today, Tomorrow	Olivia Lamasan & Enrico Santos In the Name of Love (Studio); Froilan Medina and Paul Soriano Thelma (Indie)	
22nd Young Critics Circle Awards	Haruo	N/A	Best Performer Diana Zubiri; Bahay Bata				Rodolfo Vera; Niño	
14th Gawad PASADO	Manila Kingpin: The Asiong Salonga Story; In the Name of Love; Ang Sayaw ng Dalawang Kaliwang Paa	Olivia Lamasan In the Name of Love; Alvin Yapan Ang Sayaw ng Dalawang Kaliwang Paa	Jeorge Estregan Manila Kingpin: The Asiong Salonga Story; Aga Muhlach In the Name of Love	Anne Curtis No Other Woman; Angel Locsin In the Name of Love	Paulo Avelino; Ang Sayaw ng Dalawang Kaliwang Paa	Bangs Garcia; Segunda Mano	Kriz G. Gazmen & Ricardo Fernando II; No Other Woman	
10th Gawad TANGLAW	Ang Babae sa Septic Tank	Marlon Rivera; Ang Babae sa Septic Tank	Martin Escudero; Zombadings… Patayin sa Shokot si Remington	Eugene Domingo; Ang Babae sa Septic Tank	Kerbie Zamora; Zombadings... Patayin sa Syokot si Remington	Fides Cuyugan Asencio; Niño	Chris Martinez; Ang Babae sa Septic Tank	
9th Golden Screen Awards	Niño (Drama); Ang Babae sa Septic Tank (Musical or Comedy)	Marlon Rivera; Ang Babae sa Septic Tank	Aga Muhlach In the Name of Love (Drama); Martin Escudero Zombadings... Patayin sa Shokot si Remington (Musical or Comedy); Edgar Allan Guzman Ligo Na Ü, Lapit Na Me	Jean Garcia Ang Sayaw ng Dalawang Kaliwang Paa (Drama); Eugene Domingo Ang Babae sa Septic Tank (Musical or Comedy)	Art Acuña; Niño	Sharmaine Buencamino; Niño	Chris Martinez; Ang Babae sa Septic Tank	

== See also ==
- 2011 in the Philippines
- List of 2011 box office number-one films in the Philippines
