= Luna Award for Best Picture =

Award presented annually by the Film Academy of the Philippines

- Awarded for: Best Motion Picture of the Year
- First award: April 27, 1983; 43 years ago
- Currently held by: GomBurZa (2023)
- Website: filmacademy.gov.ph

The Luna Award for Best Picture is one of the Luna Awards presented annually by the Film Academy of the Philippines (FAP). It has been given since the inaugural ceremony of the awards on April 27, 1983. It is given to the to the producers of the best Philippine full-length motion picture of the year. The Best Picture award is traditionally the final award handed in each ceremony and is widely considered as the most prestigious honor of the ceremony.

== Winners and nominees ==
=== 1980s ===
Year of film release	Film	Producer(s)
1982 (1st)	Batch '81	Marichu Maceda
1983 (2nd)	Pieta	
1984 (3rd)	Sister Stella L.	
1985 (4th)	Bayan Ko	Véra Belmont
1986 (5th)	Gabi Na, Kumander	Ramon Salvador
1987 (6th)	Saan Nagtatago ang Pag-ibig?	
1988 (7th)	Boy Negro	
1989 (8th)	Bilangin ang Bituin sa Langit	Lily Monteverde

=== 1990s ===
Year of film release	Film	Producer(s)
1990 (9th)	Dirty Affair	Vic R. del Rosario Jr. and Boy de Guia
1991 (10th)	Ipagpatawad Mo	
1992 (11th)	Ikaw Pa Lang ang Minahal	Armida Siguion-Reyna
1993 (12th)	Masahol Pa sa Hayop	
1994 (13th)	Pangako ng Kahapon	
1995 (14th)	The Flor Contemplacion Story	Vic R. Del Rosario Jr. and William Leary
1996 (15th)	Hangga't May Hininga	Malou Santos
1997 (16th)	Eseng ng Tondo	
1998 (17th)	Bata, Bata... Pa'no Ka Ginawa?	Charo Santos-Concio, Malou Santos and Trina Dayrit
1999 (18th)	Bulaklak ng Maynila	

=== 2000s ===
Year of film release	Film	Producer(s)
2000 (19th)	Tanging Yaman	Elma Medua
2001 (20th)	Abakada... Ina	Vic del Rosario Jr.
2002 (21st)	Lapu-Lapu	Florante Castillo, Lito Marcos, Mark Lapid, William Mayo, and Wilson Chua
2003 (22nd)	Magnifico	Violeta Sevilla
2004 (23rd)	Aishite Imasu 1941	Roselle Monteverde-Teo
2005 (24th)	Blue Moon	Lily Monteverde and Roselle Monteverde-Teo
2006 (25th)	Kasal, Kasali, Kasalo	Charo Santos-Concio and Malou Santos
2007 (26th)	Baler	Vicente Del Rosario III and Veronique Del Rosario
2008 (27th)	Rosario	Bong Santa Maria
2009 (28th)	Not held	

=== 2000s ===
Year of film release	Film	Producer(s)
2010 (29th)	Emir	Digna Santiago, Rolando Atienza, and Nestor Jardin
2010 (29th)	Noy	Arnel Nacario and Kate Valenzuela
2010 (29th)	Rosario	Bong Sta. Maria
2010 (29th)	Sa 'yo Lamang	Charo Santos-Concio and Malou Santos
2011 (30th)	Manila Kingpin: The Asiong Salonga Story	Leonard Villalon
2011 (30th)	Ang Babae sa Septic Tank	Chris Martinez, Marlon Rivera, Josabeth Alonso, and John Victor Tence
2011 (30th)	No Other Woman	Charo Santos-Concio, Malou Santos, Vic del Rosario Jr., Vincent del Rosario III, and Veronique del Rosario-Corpus
2011 (30th)	Segunda Mano	
2011 (30th)	Thelma	Samantha Chavez Que, Rino Que, Maja Salvador, and Paul Soriano
2011 (30th)	Zombadings 1: Patayin sa Shokot si Remington	
2012 (31st)	El Presidente	Maylyn Villalon-Enriquez and Leonard Villalon
2012 (31st)	Bwakaw	Jun Robles Lana, Ramel David, Perci Intalan, Jojo Oconer, and Michael Tuviera
2012 (31st)	One More Try	Charo Santos-Concio and Malou Santos
2012 (31st)	Sta. Niña	Rodel Nacianceno, Emmanuel Quindo Palo, and Susan Tagle
2012 (31st)	The Healing	Charo Santos-Concio and Malou Santos
2012 (31st)	The Mistress	Charo Santos-Concio and Malou Santos
2012 (31st)	Thy Womb	Melvin Mangada, Tong Puno, Brillante Mendoza, and Jaime Santiago
2013 (32nd)	Not held	
2014 (33rd)	Not held	
2015 (34th)	Heneral Luna	E.A. Rocha and Fernando Ortigas
2015 (34th)	Apocalypse Child	
2015 (34th)	Crazy Beautiful You	Charo Santos-Concio and Malou Santos
2015 (34th)	Felix Manalo	Vincent del Rosario III and Veronique del Rosario-Corpus
2015 (34th)	Honor Thy Father	Erik Matti
2015 (34th)	Kid Kulafu	Charo Santos-Concio, Malou N. Santos, Paul Soriano, and Evangeline del Rosario
2015 (34th)	The Breakup Playlist	Charo Santos-Concio, Malou Santos, and Vic Del Rosario Jr.
2015 (34th)	The Love Affair	Marizel Samson-Martinez
2015 (34th)	That Thing Called Tadhana	Ronald Arguelles
2016 (35th)	Die Beautiful	Jun Robles Lana and Ferdinand Lapuz
2016 (35th)	Ang Hapis at Himagsik ni Hermano Puli	Gil Portes
2016 (35th)	Dukot	Paul Soriano and Erwin Blanco
2016 (35th)	Ignacio de Loyola	Pauline Mangilog-Saltarin and Ernestine Tamana
2016 (35th)	Ma’ Rosa	Larry Castillo
2016 (35th)	Pamilya Ordinaryo	Ferdinand Lapuz and John Joseph Tan
2016 (35th)	Saving Sally	Avid Liongoren, Hervé Pennequin, Alain de la Mata, and Catherine Jaques
2016 (35th)	Vince & Kath & James	Charo Santos-Concio and Malou N. Santos
2017 (36th)	Ang Larawan	Girlie Rodis and Celeste Legaspi
2017 (36th)	Changing Partners	Antoinette Jadaone and Dan Villegas
2017 (36th)	Chanters	Cai Cena, Thop Nazareno, and Ferdinand Lapuz
2017 (36th)	Historiographika Errata	
2017 (36th)	Kita Kita	Piolo Pascual, Joyce Bernal, Erick Raymundo, Sky Gonda, and Erwin Blanco
2017 (36th)	Love You to the Stars and Back	Charo Santos-Concio and Malou Santos
2017 (36th)	Neomanila	Nicole Runi and Sara Santiago
2017 (36th)	Respeto	Monster Jimenez
2017 (36th)	Seven Sundays	Elma Medua
2017 (36th)	Siargao	Paul Soriano
2018 (37th)	Goyo: The Boy General	Joe Alandy and Daphne Chiu
2018 (37th)	BuyBust	Erik Matti, Ronald Stephen Monteverde, Vicente del Rosario III, Veronique del Rosario, and Agung Bagus
2018 (37th)	Gusto Kita with All My Hypothalamus	Jun Robles Lana, Perci Intalan, Madonna Tarrayo, and Bianca Balbuena
2018 (37th)	Liway	Alemberg Ang
2018 (37th)	Signal Rock	Chito Roño
2019 (38th)	Mindanao	Brillante Mendoza and Carlo Valenzona
2019 (38th)	Hello, Love, Goodbye	John Leo Garcia and Carmi Raymundo
2019 (38th)	KontrAdiksyon	James Dy
2019 (38th)	Quezon's Game	Carlo Katigbak and Olivia Lamasan
2019 (38th)	Verdict	Brillante Mendoza

=== 2020s ===
Year of film release	Film	Producer(s)
2022 (39th)	Family Matters	James Blanco
2022 (39th)	Katips	Base Hernandez and Ronnie Rodillas
2022 (39th)	Mahal Kita, Beksman	Vic del Rosario, Jun Lana, Perci Intalan, Vincent Del Rosario III, and Veronique Del Rosario-Corpus
2022 (39th)	Maid in Malacañang	Vincent del Rosario III and Veronique del Rosario-Corpus
2022 (39th)	Nanahimik ang Gabi	Shugo Praico, Philip King, and Lino Cayetano
2023 (40th)	GomBurZa	Pauline Mangilog-Saltarin and Ernestine Tamana
2023 (40th)	In His Mother's Eyes	Ellen Nicolas Criste
2023 (40th)	Rewind	Carmi Raymundo, Daisy Cayanan-Mejares, Camille Montaño, Marjorie Lachica
2023 (40th)	Third World Romance	Kookai Libayen, Benedict Mendoza, and Maria Kristina Cruz
2023 (40th)	When I Met You in Tokyo	Redgie Magno
2025/26 (41st)	TBA	TBA
