= Yesterday's Bride =

Philippine television drama series

- Title card
- Genre: Drama
- Developed by: Maribel Ilag
- Written by: Ana Aleta Nadela; Liberty Trinidad
- Directed by: Gil Tejada Jr.
- Creative director: Jun Lana
- Starring: Lovi Poe
- Theme music composer: Freddie Saturno
- Opening theme: "Tunay na Mahal" by Jaya
- Country of origin: Philippines
- Original language: Tagalog
- No. of episodes: 85

Production
- Executive producer: Joy Lumboy-Pili
- Production locations: Pampanga, Philippines; Manila, Philippines
- Cinematography: Lito Mempin
- Camera setup: Multiple-camera setup
- Running time: 30–45 minutes
- Production company: GMA Entertainment TV

Original release
- Network: GMA Network
- Release: October 29, 2012 – February 22, 2013

Yesterday's Bride is a Philippine television drama series broadcast by GMA Network. Directed by Gil Tejada Jr., it stars Lovi Poe in the title role. It premiered on October 29, 2012 on the network's Afternoon Prime line up. The series concluded on February 22, 2013, with a total of 85 episodes.

== Cast and characters ==
Cast

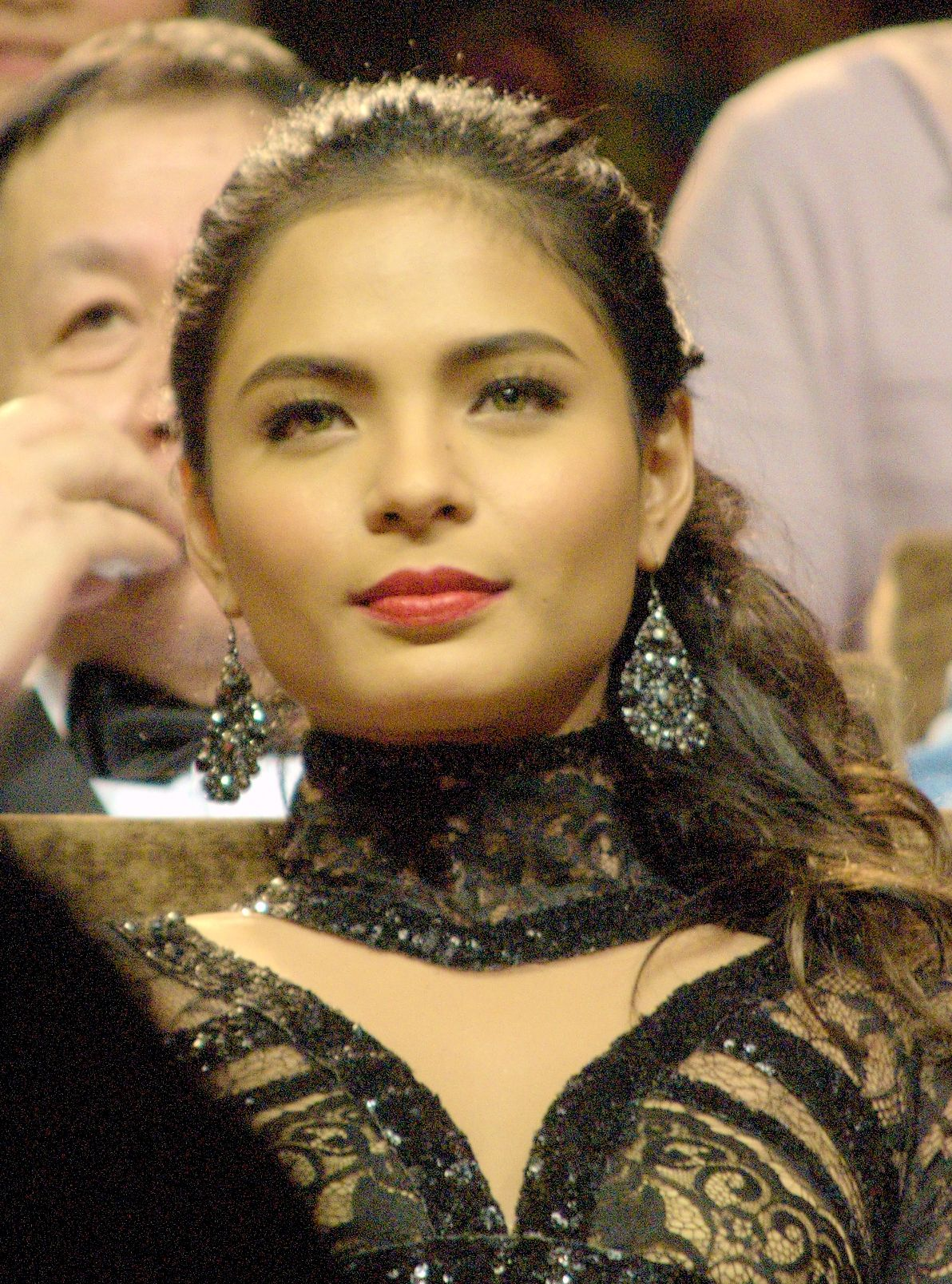
Lovi Poe

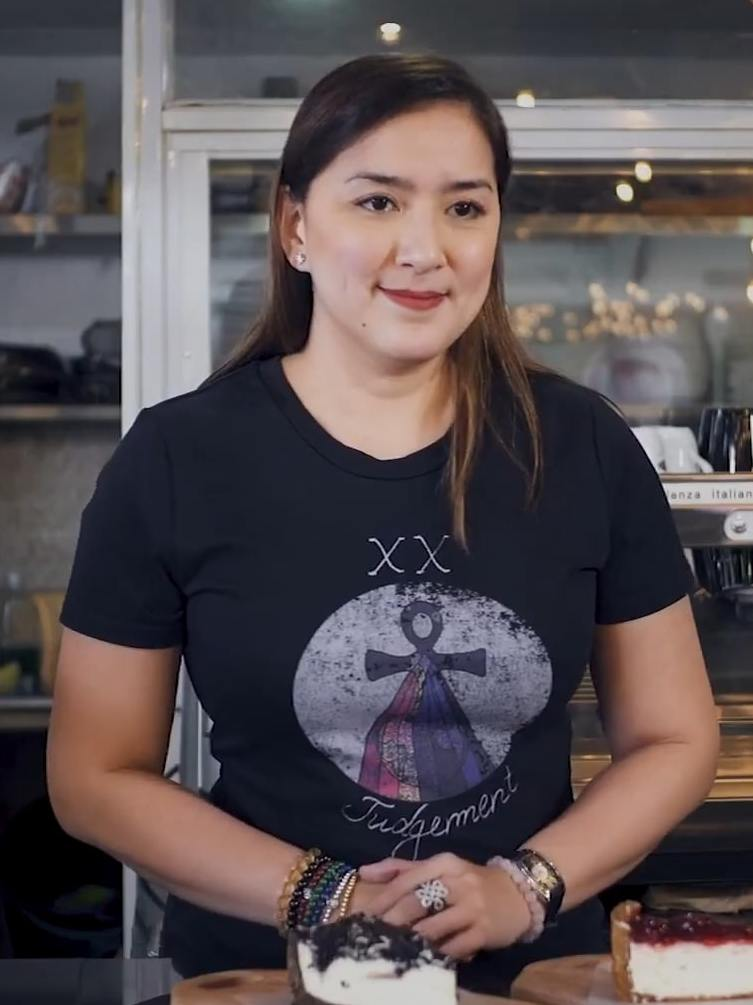
Ara Mina

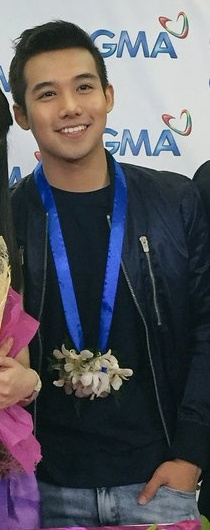
Ken Chan

=== Lead cast ===
- Lovi Poe as Andrea Manalo / Lorraine Agustin

Works in a furniture shop owned by the Ramirezes, the simple, uneducated but kind-hearted, Andrea falls in love with her boss's son, Justin Ramirez. Despite their diverse social backgrounds and the obvious opposition of the latter's parents, the young lovers are determined to fight for their love and happiness. On her way to her wedding with Justin, an accident strikes which renders her into a coma. Andrea is found pregnant. The more that Justin shows his care, love and attention for her. Another twist of fate comes to a worse when fire breaks out in the hospital. Miraculously, Andrea wakes up and finds herself in a mansion not knowing who the owner is, and even forgetting her name and her past.

=== Supporting cast ===
- Rocco Nacino as Justin Ramirez

Born from a prominent family, Justin is the sheltered heir of the Ramirezes. He falls deeply in love with their lowly worker, Andrea Manalo, much to his mother's dismay. Out of extreme love, he braves all the obstacles just to be with the woman he loves. Tragedy strikes and fate takes a sudden twist and destroy their dreams of having a simple and happy family life together.

- Luis Alandy as Celso Agustin
- Karel Marquez as Sabrina Torres

The doctor who delivered Andrea's baby. A bipolar woman who loves Justin Ramirez to a passion. She will do anything to lure the latter into her trap and determined to take down anyone who dares to get in her way.

- Ara Mina as Josilda Ramirez

Justin's ambitious and arrogant mother and the owner of the huge furniture shop where Andrea works. She will do everything to keep her precious son away from Andrea, even if it means making life hell for Andrea in the most evil way imaginable.

- Emilio Garcia as Pete Ramirez
- Mark Bautista as Dave Serrano
- Raquel Villavicencio as Conchita Agustin
- Nina Ricci Alagao as Suzanne Torres

A strong-willed and cunning woman who will do whatever it takes just to protect her daughter from further pain and disappointments in life.

- Lou Sison as Fey

The personal nurse-turned-close friend of Loraine/Andrea.

- Ken Chan as Joel Ramirez

== Development ==
Series' creator, Liberty Trinidad stated that the series presents an interesting take to a seemingly perfect love story, as it explores the moral dilemma of the protagonist and how she must decide between the two men who love her. "The show is very current and viewers will be able to relate to Andrea's [the main character of the story] predicament because even though their situation may be different, everyone has to make tough decisions especially when it comes to love," she added.

=== Casting ===
Lovi Poe played the titular character, Andrea Manalo. Poe described her role "the most quiet role I have ever played" and far different from the strong-willed and independent characters she did in television series, Legacy and movies, Temptation Island and My Neighbor's Wife. "It looks easy but it is a lot harder for me. I am used to playing independent and strong women. This time around, it is more about falling in love and becoming martyr. It is something new to me," she said. By far "It's challenging because there will be adjustments in my attack. Coming from strong female characters, it’s not that easy to create nuances for your new role. But this is where the excitement lies. It will definitely test your range as an actress," she added. Rocco Nacino cast as Justin Ramirez, one of the two leading men of the protagonist. Nacino stated that it's his "first mature role". Nacino and Poe first worked together in 2010 television series Mistaken Identity. Luis Alandy and Karel Marquez, on the other hand, played Celso Ramirez, the other love interest and Sabrina Torres, the series' main antagonist, respectively.

== Production ==
The series' plug, teasers, as well as the opening title sequence were filmed in a studio at GMA Network Center, in Quezon City. Principal photography commenced on October 12, 2012. Many of the series' scenes were shot on location in Angeles, Pampanga.

== Ratings ==
According to AGB Nielsen Philippines' Nationwide Urban Television Audience Measurement overnight ratings, the pilot episode of Yesterday's Bride earned a 14.8% rating. The final episode scored a 21.8% rating in Mega Manila household television ratings.

== Accolades ==
Accolades received by Yesterday's Bride
Year	Award	Category	Recipient	Result	Ref.
2012	FMTM Awards	Top 10 Best Philippine TV Series	Yesterday's Bride	Top 8	
2012	FMTM Awards	Daytime Prince Netizens' Awards	Rocco Nacino	Won	
