= Flotsam (film) =

2015 film directed by Jay Abello

- Theatrical release poster
- Directed by: Jay Abello
- Screenplay by: Jay Abello; Mickey Galang; Joncy Sumulong
- Produced by: Darlene Catly Malimas; Francesca Silvestre
- Starring: Solenn Heussaff; Rocco Nacino; Mara Lopez; Carla Humphries; Adrian Cabido
- Cinematography: Jay Abello
- Edited by: Ilsa Malsi
- Music by: Marcus Adoro; Bo Bismark; Kiddo Cosio; Francis de Veyra; Mia Sebastian; Joncy Sumulong
- Production company: Banana Pancake Trail Productions
- Distributed by: Banana Pancake Trail Productions
- Release date: November 4, 2015
- Running time: 107 minutes
- Country: Philippines
- Language: Filipino

Flotsam is a 2015 Philippine romance film directed by Jay Abello. The screenplay was written by Jay Abello, Mickey Galang, and Joncy Sumulong. The film stars Solenn Heussaff, Rocco Nacino, Mara Lopez, Carla Humphries, and Adrian Cabido.

== Synopsis ==
Kai, a workaholic architect runs away from a volatile relationship and ends up staying in a small beach resort where she engages in a summer romance with Tisoy, a mysterious bartender.

== Cast ==
- Solenn Heussaff as Kai
- Rocco Nacino as Tisoy
- Carla Humphries as Mia
- Mara Lopez as Jamie
- Adrian Cabido as Angelo
- Gerard Garcia as Gerard Sison
