= Mara Lopez =

American and Filipino actress

Mara Isabella Lopez Yokohama
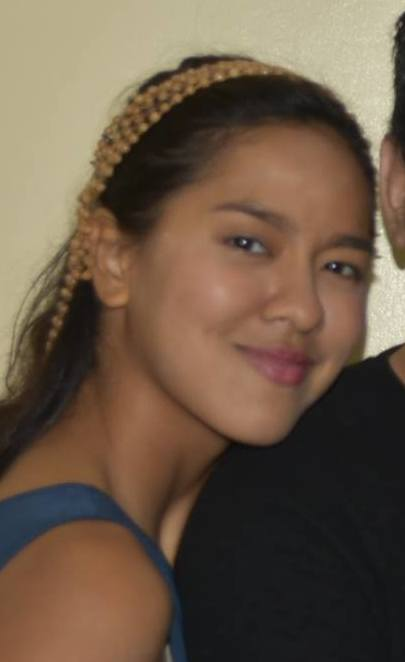
- Lopez in July 2017
- Born: Mara Isabella Yokohama (Note: Mara Lopez was born in the United States of America. Thus, she does not possess her mother's maiden name which is Lopez.)
- Occupations: Actress; surfer
- Years active: 1998–present
- Agents: Star Magic; GMA Artist Center
- Mother: Maria Isabel Lopez

Mara Isabella Yokohama, known professionally as Mara Lopez, is an American and Filipino actress. She is a member of Star Magic Batch 13.

== Career ==
=== Acting ===
Lopez made her acting debut in 2003, playing a younger version of her real-life mother Maria Isabel Lopez, in an episode in GMA's Magpakailanman.

In 2006 she was launched, along with 23 other aspiring actors and actresses, as a member of Star Magic Batch 13. She then starred in ABS-CBN's Sineserye Presents: Natutulog Ba Ang Diyos?. In 2002, she played the lead role in the indie film Following Rosa, a Sundance Film Festival entry.

Yokohama was one of the castaways of Survivor Philippines: Celebrity Doubles Showdown in November 2011.

In 2015, she was now a freelancer.

=== Sports ===
Her father Hiroshi Yokohama was the one who taught Mara how to surf. She learned how to surf at age 6 in the coastal barangay of Urbiztondo in La Union.

Aside from surfing, she also practices Brazilian jiu-jitsu. She was first introduced to the by actor Sid Lucero. She also competed in the 2016 World Championship in jiu-jitsu.

== Filmography ==
=== Film ===
Year	Title	Role	Notes	Source
2002	Masarap Na Pugad	Young Koala		
2008	Sta. Mesa	Sel	Alternative title: "Following Rosa"; Credited as "Maria Lopez"	
2009	Tulak			
2010	Watawat			
2012	Palitan			
2013	Ang Kwento ni Mabuti	Lucia de la Cruz		
2013	Debosyon	Salome		
2014	K'na, The Dreamweaver	K'na		
2014	Tres		"Tata Selo" segment	
2015	Haunted Mansion	Teacher		
2015	Flotsam	Jamie		
2018	BuyBust			

=== Television ===
Year	Title	Role	Notes	Source
2007	Star Magic Presents: Abt Ur Luv			
2007	Sineserye Presents: Natutulog Ba ang Dios	Tina Ramirez		
2007	Love Spell Presents: Cindy-rella	Mona		
2008	Star Magic Presents: Astigs in Haay...skul lyf	Mara		
2008	Maalaala Mo Kaya	Payang	Episode: "Notebook"	
2008	Maalaala Mo Kaya	Lilac volunteer	Episode: "Journal"	
2009	Maalaala Mo Kaya		Episode: "Boarding House"	
2009	Shall We Dance: The Celebrity Dance Challenge	Herself	Episode: "Mama and Me"; Guest, with Maria Isabel Lopez	
2010	Maalaala Mo Kaya	Jenna's colleague	Episode: "Litrato"	
2010	Maalaala Mo Kaya	Fe	Episode: "Bracelet"	
2010	Elena M. Patron's Momay	Stephanie		
2011	Reputasyon	Sheila		
2011	Maalaala Mo Kaya	Daughter	Episode: "Bibliya"	
2011–2012	Survivor Philippines: Celebrity Doubles Showdown	Herself - Castaway	Runner Up	
2013	Titser	Rosa		
2014	Daybreak	Herself / Guest		
2015	Pasión De Amor	Dinora Rosales		
2015	Showbiz Unlimited	Herself / Guest		
2015	Single / Single	Tricci		
2015	Karelasyon	Selya		
2016	The Story of Us	Teresa	Supporting Cast	
2017	Wagas	Lauren	Episode: ‘’My Love From Baler’’	
2017	Tadhana	Joana	Episode: “Hagod”	
2018	Maalaala Mo Kaya	Marie	Episode: "Lason"	
2018	Precious Hearts Romances Presents: Los Bastardos	young Sita		
2019	Maalaala Mo Kaya	Dim	Episode: "MVP"	
2019–2020	The Killer Bride	Agnes Sagrado / Agnes Dimaguiba	Supporting Cast / Antagonist	
2021–2022	The World Between Us	Venus Libradilla	Supporting Cast / Protagonist	
