= Titser (TV series) =

2013 Philippine television drama series

- Title card
- Also known as: The Teacher
- Genre: Drama
- Developed by: Nessa Valdellon; Alvin Yapan
- Written by: Nessa Valdellon
- Directed by: Alvin Yapan
- Starring: Lovi Poe
- Theme music composer: Teresa Barrozo
- Country of origin: Philippines
- Original language: Tagalog
- No. of episodes: 10

Production
- Executive producer: Alemberg Ang
- Production locations: Boso-Boso, Antipolo, Philippines
- Cinematography: Dexter dela Peña
- Camera setup: Multiple-camera setup
- Running time: 38–45 minutes
- Production company: GMA News and Public Affairs

Original release
- Network: GMA News TV
- Release: August 11 – October 13, 2013

Titser (transl. teacher / international title: The Teacher) is a 2013 Philippine television drama series broadcast by GMA News TV. Directed by Alvin Yapan, it stars Lovi Poe in the title role. It premiered on August 11, 2013. The series concluded on October 13, 2013, with a total of 10 episodes.

The series is streaming online on YouTube.

== Cast and characters ==
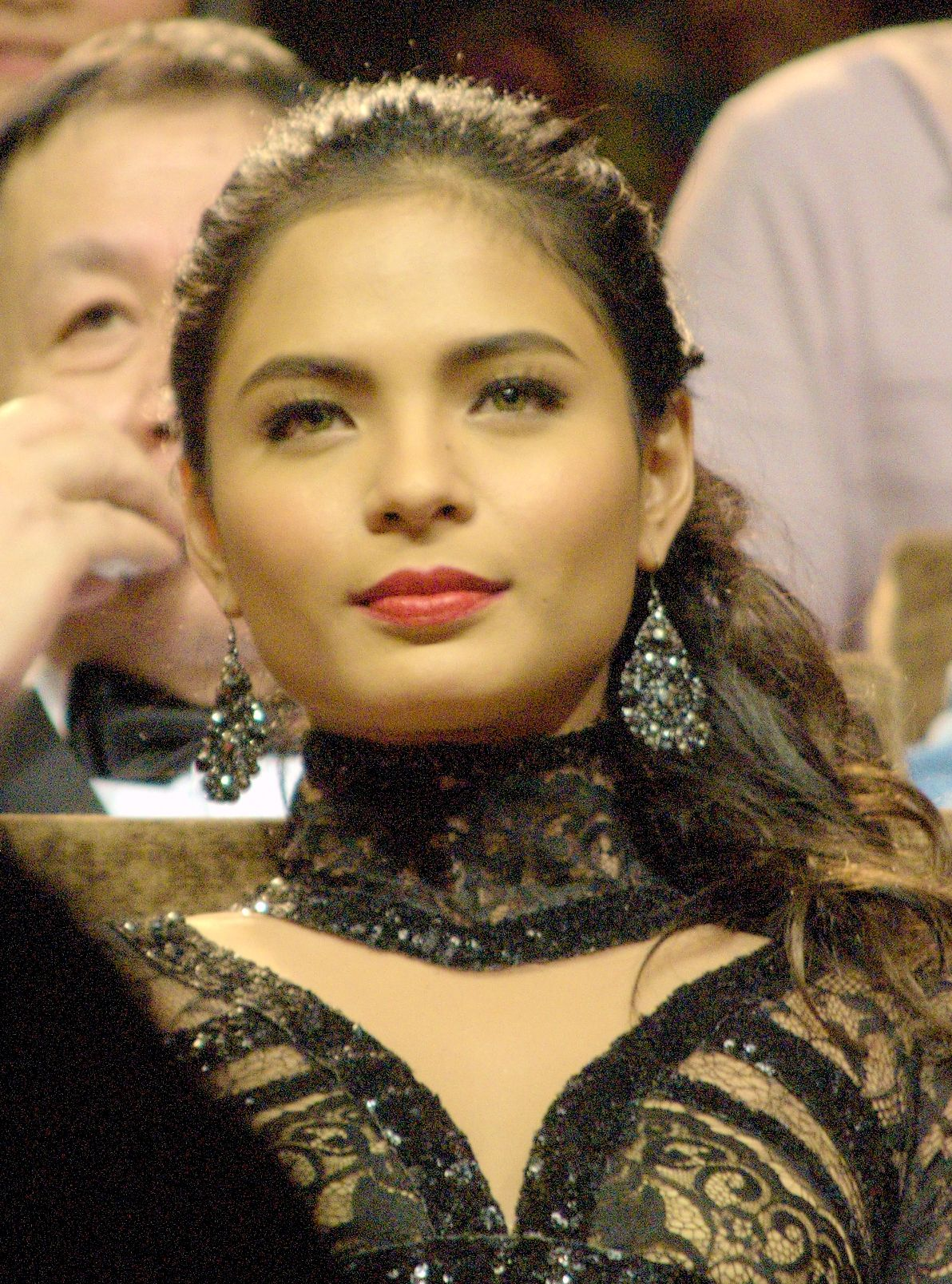
Lovi Poe portrays Michelle Maturan.

Lead cast

- Lovi Poe as Michelle Maturan

Supporting cast

- Mara Lopez as Rosa
- Agot Isidro as Sandra
- Irma Adlawan as May Deroca
- Gardo Versoza as Gil
- Arnel Ignacio
- Rocco Nacino as Joseph Santiago
- Mikael Daez as Kurt Reyes
- Carl Guevarra as Neil

== Production ==
Principal photography commenced on June 8, 2013 in Boso-Boso, Antipolo.

== Episodes ==
Titser episodes
No.	Title	Original release date
1	"Pilot"	August 11, 2013
2	"A Tough Competition"	August 18, 2013
3	"False Hopes"	August 25, 2013
4	"Broken Dreams"	September 1, 2013
5	"Tragedy in San Simeon High"	September 8, 2013
6	"An Unexpected Love Story"	September 15, 2013
7	"Michelle as a Teacher"	September 22, 2013
8	"Michelle Meets the Mayor"	September 29, 2013
9	"Finale Primer"	October 6, 2013
A recap of previous episodes.
10	"The Greatest Dream"	October 13, 2013
