= List of Owe My Love episodes =

Owe My Love is a 2021 Philippine television drama series broadcast by GMA Network. It premiered on the network's Telebabad line up and worldwide via GMA Pinoy TV from February 15, 2021, to June 4, 2021.

== Series overview ==
Season	Episodes	Originally released	
Season	Episodes	First released	Last released
1	76	February 15, 2021	June 4, 2021

== Episodes ==
No. overall	No. in season	Title	Social media hashtag	Original release date	AGB Nielsen Ratings (NUTAM People)	Timeslot rank
1	1	"Pilot"	#OweMyLovePilot	February 15, 2021	11.5%	#1
2	2	"Delivery"	#OMLDelivery	February 16, 2021	N/A	TBA
3	3	"Missing"	#OMLMissing	February 17, 2021	11.4%	#1
4	4	"Emergency"	#OMLEmergency	February 18, 2021	12.2%	#1
5	5	"Decision"	#OMLDecision	February 19, 2021	12.1%	#1
6	6	"Deal"	#OMLDeal	February 22, 2021	13.1%	#1
7	7	"Set-up"	#OMLSetUp	February 23, 2021	13.3%	#1
8	8	"Rescue"	#OMLRescue	February 24, 2021	13.6%	#1
9	9	"Second Chance"	#OMLSecondChance	February 25, 2021	N/A	TBA
10	10	"Contract"	#OMLContract	February 26, 2021	13.0%	#1
11	11	"Switch"	#OMLSwitch	March 1, 2021	13.0%	#1
12	12	"Lies"	#OMLLies	March 2, 2021	12.5%	#1
13	13	"Job Hunt"	#OMLJobHunt	March 3, 2021	12.5%	#1
14	14	"Apology"	#OMLApology	March 4, 2021	N/A	TBA
15	15	"Suspect"	#OMLSuspect	March 5, 2021	13.4%	#1
16	16	"Party"	#OMLParty	March 8, 2021	11.8%	#1
17	17	"Faith"	#OMLFaith	March 9, 2021	11.8%	#1
18	18	"Appeal"	#OMLAppeal	March 10, 2021	12.1%	#1
19	19	"Truth"	#OMLTruth	March 11, 2021	13.1%	#1
20	20	"Restart"	#OMLRestart	March 12, 2021	12.3%	#1
21	21	"Search"	#OMLSearch	March 15, 2021	12.4%	#1
22	22	"Prediction"	#OMLPrediction	March 16, 2021	13.8%	#1
23	23	"Premonition"	#OMLPremonition	March 17, 2021	12.5%	#1
24	24	"Scam"	#OMLScam	March 18, 2021	N/A	TBA
25	25	"Devilna"	#OMLDevilna	March 19, 2021	12.8%	#1
26	26	"Danger"	#OMLDanger	March 22, 2021	11.5%	#1
27	27	"Jealous"	#OMLJealous	March 23, 2021	N/A	TBA
28	28	"Bukayo"	#OMLBukayo	March 24, 2021	12.0%	#1
29	29	"Escape"	#OMLEscape	March 25, 2021	10.0%	#1
30	30	"Intense"	#OMLIntense	March 29, 2021	11.5%	#1
31	31	"Confession"	#OMLConfession	March 30, 2021	11.7%	#1
32	32	"Label"	#OMLLabel	March 31, 2021	13.0%	#1
33	33	"Karibal" (transl. Rival)	#OMLKaribal	April 5, 2021	11.0%	#1
34	34	"Paandaran" (transl. Motion)	#OMLPaandaran	April 6, 2021	10.4%	#1
35	35	"Showdown"	#OMLShowdown	April 7, 2021	10.2%	#1
36	36	"Threat"	#OMLThreat	April 8, 2021	9.9%	#1
37	37	"Code Blue"	#OMLCodeBlue	April 9, 2021	10.4%	#1
38	38	"Laban" (transl. Fight)	#OMLLaban	April 12, 2021	N/A	TBA
39	39	"Gitgitan" (transl. Jostle)	#OMLGitgitan	April 13, 2021	N/A	TBA
40	40	"Concerned"	#OMLConcerned	April 14, 2021	N/A	TBA
41	41	"Addiction"	#OMLAddiction	April 15, 2021	10.1%	#1
42	42	"First Date"	#OMLFirstDate	April 16, 2021	11.0%	#1
43	43	"Fight"	#OMLFight	April 19, 2021	10.3%	#1
44	44	"Yes"	#OMLYes	April 20, 2021	10.3%	#1
45	45	"Fake"	#OMLFake	April 21, 2021	10.3%	#1
46	46	"Meet The Guipits"	#OMLMeetTheGuipits	April 22, 2021	10.6%	#1
47	47	"Maling Akala" (transl. Wrong Assumption)	#OMLMalingAkala	April 23, 2021	N/A	TBA
48	48	"Impostor"	#OMLImpostor	April 26, 2021	9.9%	#1
49	49	"Cake"	#OMLCake	April 27, 2021	10.1%	#1
50	50	"Chicken"	#OMLChicken	April 28, 2021	N/A	TBA
51	51	"Buko Pie"	#OMLBukoPie	April 29, 2021	9.7%	#1
52	52	"Bisto" (transl. Caught)	#OMLBisto	April 30, 2021	10.0%	#1
53	53	"Crime Scene"	#OMLCrimeScene	May 3, 2021	N/A	TBA
54	54	"Agaw Buhay" (transl. Dying)	#OMLAgawBuhay	May 4, 2021	N/A	TBA
55	55	"Tatay Oryo" (transl. Father Oryo)	#OMLTatayOryo	May 5, 2021	9.7%	#1
56	56	"Paramdam" (transl. Hint)	#OMLParamdam	May 6, 2021	9.7%	#1
57	57	"Rebelasyon" (transl. Revelation)	#OMLRebelasyon	May 7, 2021	10.0%	#1
58	58	"Next Move"	#OMLNextMove	May 10, 2021	9.7%	#1
59	59	"Patawad" (transl. Sorry)	#OMLPatawad	May 11, 2021	9.4%	#1
60	60	"Pirma" (transl. Signature)	#OMLPirma	May 12, 2021	9.8%	#1
61	61	"Bagong Buhay" (transl. New Life)	#OMLBagongBuhay	May 13, 2021	9.3%	#1
62	62	"Wedding"	#OMLWedding	May 14, 2021	10.6%	#1
63	63	"Balikbayan"	#OMLBalikbayan	May 17, 2021	10.0%	#1
64	64	"Gender Reveal"	#OMLGenderReveal	May 18, 2021	N/A	TBA
65	65	"Ulan" (transl. Rain)	#OMLUlan	May 19, 2021	9.6%	#1
66	66	"Forgiveness"	#OMLForgiveness	May 20, 2021	N/A	TBA
67	67	"Proposal"	#OMLProposal	May 21, 2021	9.0%	#1
68	68	"London"	#OMLLondon	May 24, 2021	8.6%	#1
69	69	"Chase"	#OMLChase	May 25, 2021	9.6%	#1
70	70	"Closure"	#OMLClosure	May 26, 2021	8.9%	#1
71	71	"Trixie"	#OMLTrixie	May 28, 2021	N/A	TBA
72	72	"Witness"	#OMLWitness	May 31, 2021	10.0%	#1
73	73	"Car Crash"	#OMLCarCrash	June 1, 2021	9.3%	#1
74	74	"Evidence"	#OMLEvidence	June 2, 2021	10.4%	#1
75	75	"Lullaby"	#OMLLullaby	June 3, 2021	9.6%	#1
76	76	"Beginnings"	#OMLBeginnings	June 4, 2021	9.1%	#1
