= Owe My Love =

2021 Philippine television drama series

- Title card
- Genre: Drama; Romantic comedy
- Created by: Joseph Conrad Rubio
- Written by: Volta Delos Santos; Abet Pagdagdagan Raz; Aya Anunciacion; Janna Dacosta; John Anthony Rodulfo; John Lester Malabanan
- Directed by: Rember Gelera; Ray Gibraltar
- Starring: Lovi Poe; Benjamin Alves
- Country of origin: Philippines
- Original language: Tagalog
- No. of episodes: 76 (list of episodes)

Production
- Executive producer: Lowell Gene Quimson Alojado
- Production locations: Bocaue, Bulacan, Philippines
- Cinematography: Alex Espartero; Maisa Demetillo
- Camera setup: Multiple-camera setup
- Running time: 20–30 minutes
- Production company: GMA Public Affairs

Original release
- Network: GMA Network
- Release: February 15 – June 4, 2021

Owe My Love is a 2021 Philippine television drama romantic comedy series broadcast by GMA Network. Directed by Rember Gelera and Ray Gibraltar, it stars Lovi Poe and Benjamin Alves. It premiered on February 15, 2021 on the network's Telebabad line up. The series concluded on June 4, 2021, with a total of 76 episodes.

The series is streaming online on YouTube.

== Cast and characters ==
Cast

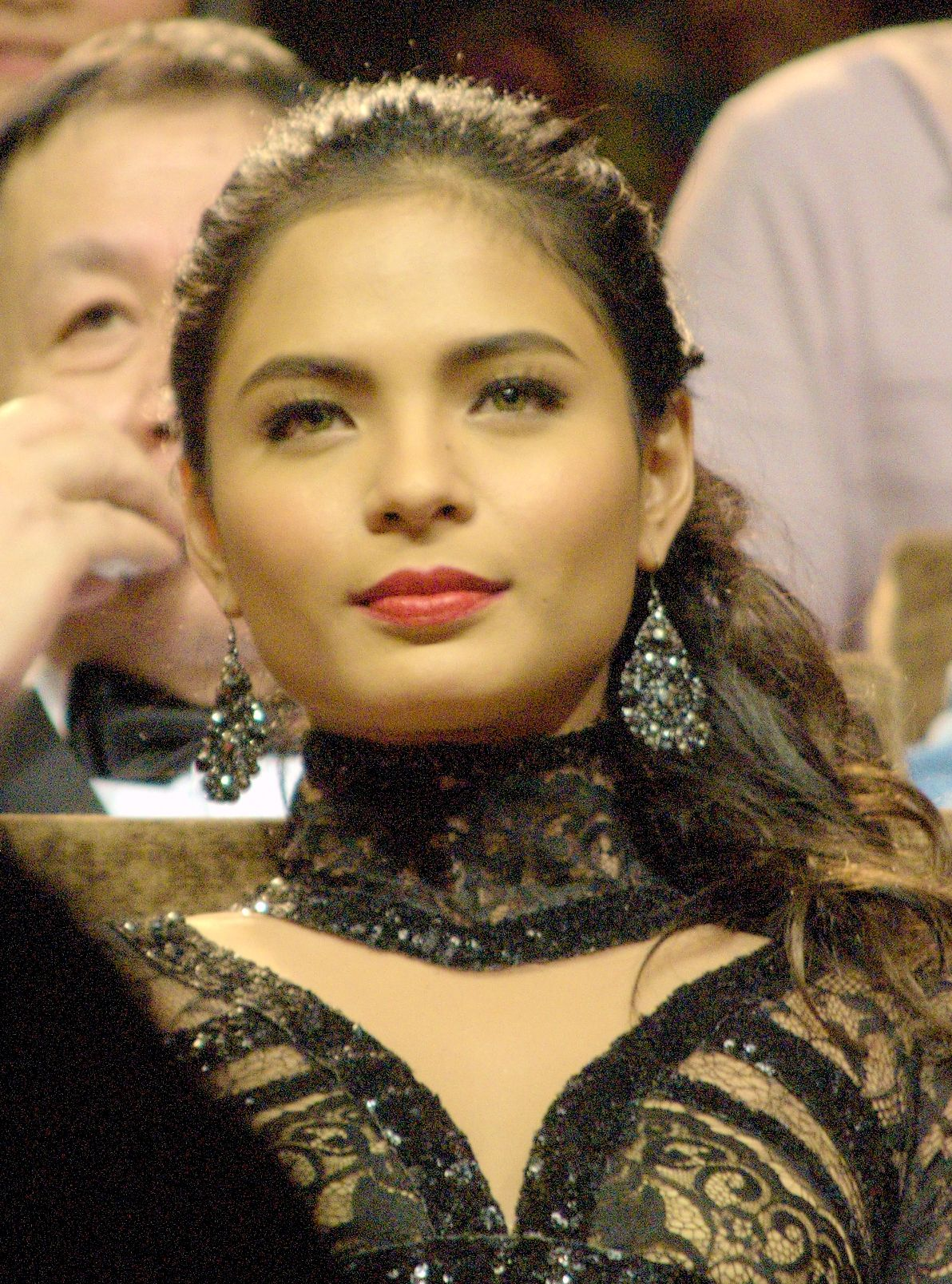
Lovi Poe

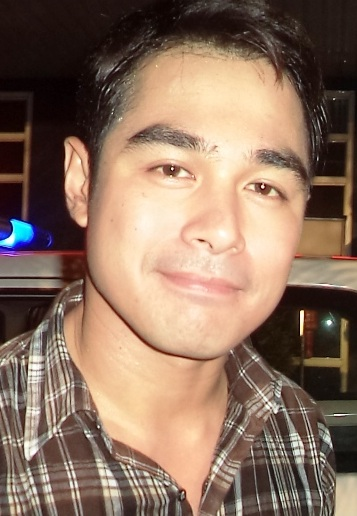
Benjamin Alves

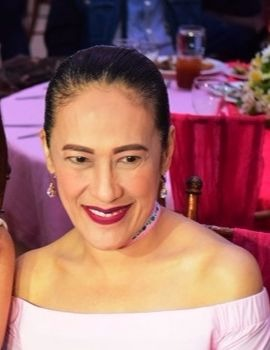
Ai-Ai delas Alas

Lead cast

- Lovi Poe as Pacencia "Sensen" D. Guipit
- Benjamin Alves as Miguel "Migs" Alcancia

Supporting cast

- Ai-Ai delas Alas as Vida Morales
- Winwyn Marquez as Trixie Gibs
- Jackie Lou Blanco as Divina Advincula
- Leo Martinez as Salvador "Badong" Alcancia
- Nova Villa as Epifania "Eps" Delos Santos
- Pekto as Gregorio "Oryo" Guipit
- Ruby Rodriguez as Corina "Coring" Delos Santos-Guipit
- Kiray Celis as Everlyn "Evs" Morales-Guipit
- Buboy Villar as Agwapito "Gwaps" D. Guipit
- Ryan Eigenmann as James Carlos "Coops" Cooper
- Jon Gutierrez as Eddie Ganondin
- Jelai Andres as Generosa "Jenny Rose" D. Guipit-Ganondin
- Jason Francisco as Richard Purr
- Terry Gian as Judith
- Divine Tetay as Juna
- Mahal as Mini Divi
- John Vic De Guzman as Roderick Ramsay
- Joaquin Manansala as Ruru Mantiko
- Patani Daño

Guest cast

- Mystica as a maid
- Gene Padilla as Gastor
- Mygz Molino as Gian Malabanan
- Patricia Ysmael as Anastasia
- Addy Raj as Amir
- Mosang as a jailmate
- Jessa Chichirita as Magenta Maldita
- Rocco Nacino as Kenneth Paul
- Kris Bernal as Melissa Alcancia
- Alex Medina as Enrico Alcancia
- Gelli de Belen as older Melissa
- Denise Barbacena as Dolores Santos

== Production ==
Principal photography commenced in March 2020. It was halted in the same month due to the enhanced community quarantine in Luzon caused by the COVID-19 pandemic. Filming was continued in November 2020.

== Ratings ==
According to AGB Nielsen Philippines' Nationwide Urban Television Audience Measurement People in television homes, the pilot episode of Owe My Love earned an 11.5% rating. The final episode scored a 9.1% rating.

== Accolades ==
Accolades received by Owe My Love
Year	Award	Category	Recipient	Result	Ref.
2023	35th PMPC Star Awards for Television	Best Drama Actress	Lovi Poe	Nominated	
2023	35th PMPC Star Awards for Television	Best Drama Supporting Actress	Winwyn Marquez	Nominated	
2023	35th PMPC Star Awards for Television	Best New Male TV Personality	John Vic Guzman	Nominated	
2023	35th PMPC Star Awards for Television	Best Primetime Drama Series	Owe My Love	Nominated	

== Controversy ==
Actress-singer Mystica complained about the production's treatment towards her. She was later fired from the show, and replaced by comedian Patani Daño in the role in November 2020.
