= Dukot =

2016 suspense thriller film by Paul Soriano

- Theatrical release poster
- Directed by: Paul Soriano
- Written by: Froilan Medina; Jaqueline Franquelli
- Produced by: Paul Soriano; Erwin Blanco
- Starring: Enrique Gil; Ricky Davao; Shaina Magdayao; Bing Pimentel; Christopher de Leon
- Cinematography: Mycko David; Odyssey Flores
- Edited by: Mark Victor
- Music by: Robbie Factoran; Ricardo Juco
- Production companies: Ten17P; Star Cinema
- Distributed by: ABS-CBN Film Productions
- Release date: July 13, 2016
- Running time: 95 minutes
- Country: Philippines
- Language: Filipino

Dukot (lit. 'Captured') is a 2016 Filipino suspense thriller film co-produced and directed by Paul Soriano and written by Froilan Medina and Jaqueline Franquelli. Based on true events, the story follows a young man who was kidnapped and held to demand ransom from his parents. The film stars Enrique Gil, Ricky Davao, Shaina Magdayao, Bing Pimentel, and Christopher de Leon.

A co-production of ABS-CBN Film Productions and Ten17P, the film was released theatrically on July 13, 2016, and was given a "B rating" by the Cinema Evaluation Board of the Philippines.

== Synopsis ==
The film centers on the family of a middle-class government official. The family goes through hell when Carlo (Gil), who is estranged from his father, is kidnapped. Carlo must be rescued; otherwise, he will be forced to fight for his life to escape a ruthless gang of ex-military mercenaries. The film revolves around two families that come from two totally different worlds. Uncontrollable circumstances will unleash a chain of events that shall compel these families to do unimaginable things to fight for what they think and feel is right.

== Cast ==
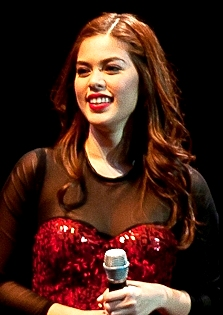
Shaina Magdayao Portrays Cathy Sandoval The Eldest Sister of Carlo Sandoval.

- Enrique Gil as Carlo Sandoval
- Ricky Davao as Charlie Sandoval
- Shaina Magdayao as Cathy Sandoval
- Bing Pimentel as Cecille Sandoval
- Ping Medina as Alex
- Alex Medina as Jimbo
- Bangs Garcia as Girlie
- Dino Pastrano as Tiny
- Christopher de Leon as Mang Johnny
- Candy Pangilinan as Police Chief Dela Vega
- Dindo Arroyo as Dr. Herrera

== Production ==
The production of the film took three months while principal photography took 20 days. In an article published by The Philippine Star, director Paul Soriano was quoted to have said that Enrique Gil was his "first and only choice" for the role of Carlo. The two met back in 2011 when Enrique auditioned for a part in Soriano's sports biographical drama film Thelma. However, Enrique did not get the part due to his then difficulty in speaking the Filipino language.

== Release ==
The film was released on July 13, 2016 in over one hundred cinemas nationwide. A premiere night for the film was held on July 12, 2016 at the Dolphy Theater inside the ABS-CBN Studios. It was attended by some of the cast and crew of the film as well as some of the executives of ABS-CBN.

=== Marketing ===
The official trailer of the film was released on YouTube on June 29, 2016 followed by extensive TV spots on ABS-CBN, ABS-CBN Sports+Action and on ABS-CBN's cable channels. The "uncut" trailer of the film was released on YouTube on July 13, 2016. A one-minute teaser trailer of the film was released by director Paul Soriano on YouTube displaying the original anamorphic widescreen aspect ratio of the film. A press conference for the film was held on July 5, 2016 that was attended by the director and some of the cast. Prior to the release, director Paul Soriano, actors Enrique Gil, Ricky Davao, and Christopher de Leon were separately invited to the late-night celebrity talk show Tonight with Boy Abunda. Shaina Magdayao was also invited to the show three days after the premiere to promote the film.

=== Critical reception ===
Philbert Ortiz Dy of ClickTheCity.com rated the film 3 stars out of 5 and wrote that "all in all, Dukot is a pretty engaging film. From scene to scene, it manages to maintain a certain tone and build up the tension. But it’s all in service of a narrative that doesn’t have any thematic follow-through. The film builds so much moral ambiguity, and there’s so much left to dissect as the film raises the volume on the music and jumps to its conclusion. This is a sharp piece of filmmaking, but what it ends up saying through its abandonment of its complexity is questionable at best." Nazamel Tabares of Movies Philippines rated the film 4 stars out of 5 and wrote that "Dukot might not be as thrilling or as meaty as the themes it tackles, but it is a well-made suspense thriller that doesn’t come often in Philippine cinemas. It lacks power in its narrative even though it hints some every now and then, but the shots are tastefully done and the story is decent enough that you get to feel the tense of the situation and what the characters are going through emotionally. Well, some of it." Rey de la Cruz Jr. of FHM Philippines rated the film 7.5 out of 10 describing the film as "a well-directed suspense thriller about a real-life kidnapping. Nice to see an actor like Enrique Gil finally show off his acting skills." Oggs Cruz of Rappler in a less positive review wrote that "the film’s failure really lies in its misdirected ambitions. It only provokes partially, quickly retreating from its hefty provocations just when the opportunity to get darker and more vicious opens up. Again, it’s all interesting in premise. Everything else is just too safe." Kevin Tan of Film Police Reviews rated the film 3 stars out of 5 and wrote that "Dukot can be commended on injecting fresh ideas into the local mainstream industry, and it shows Soriano’s maturity in his craft. However, the script lacks the guts to deliver a story as dark and gritty as its visuals. Dukot holds back on depicting hostility and violence that could have rendered audiences more upset and unsettled about today’s reality the moment they exit theaters."

== Full Cast & Crew ==
- Starring: Enrique Gil, Ricky Davao, Shaina Magdayao, Bing Pimentel, Christopher de Leon, Candy Pangilinan, Bangs Garcia, Ping Medina, Alex Medina, & Dindo Arroyo
- Directed by: Paul Soriano
- Produced by: Paul Soriano, Charo Santos-Concio, & Malou Santos
- Music by: Robbie Factoran & Ricardo Juco
- Written by: Mark Victor & Jaqueline Franquelli (as Jaqueline V. Franquelli)
- Cinematographered by: Odyssey Flores & Mycko David
- Sound by: April Castro (dubbing supervisor), Noel Urbano (dubbing supervisor)
- Costume & Wardrobe Department: Adonis Barsuela (wardrobe master - as Adonis N. Berzuela)
- Camera & Electrical Department: Ben de Vera (double cameramen), Joel Casaol (master grip)

== Awards and nominations ==
Year	Award-giving body	Recipient(s)	Award	Result	Ref.
2017	19th Gawad PASADO Awards	Enrique Gil	PinakaPASADOng Aktor	Won	
2017	Luna Awards 2017	Dukot	Best Picture	Nominated	
2017	Luna Awards 2017	Paul Soriano	Best Director	Nominated	
2017	Luna Awards 2017	Ricky Davao	Best Supporting Actor	Nominated	
2017	Luna Awards 2017	Shaina Magdayao	Best Supporting Actress	Nominated	
2017	33rd PMPC Star Awards for Movies	Dukot	Movie of the Year	Nominated	
2017	33rd PMPC Star Awards for Movies	Paul Soriano	Movie Director of the Year	Nominated	
2017	33rd PMPC Star Awards for Movies	Ricky Davao	Movie Supporting Actor of the Year	Nominated	
2017	33rd PMPC Star Awards for Movies	Froilan Medina	Movie Screenwriter of the Year	Nominated	
2017	33rd PMPC Star Awards for Movies	Mycko David and Odyssey Flores	Movie Cinematographer of the Year	Nominated	
2017	33rd PMPC Star Awards for Movies	Mark Victor	Movie Editor of the Year	Nominated	
2017	33rd PMPC Star Awards for Movies	Robbie Factoran, Ricardo Jugo, and Mark Villar	Movie Musical Scorer of the Year	Nominated	
2017	33rd PMPC Star Awards for Movies	Joshua Cantillon, Jason Conanan, Kimberly Ocampo	Movie Sound Engineer of the Year	Nominated	
