= Debosyon =

- Film poster
- Directed by: Alvin Yapan
- Written by: Alvin Yapan
- Produced by: Alvin Yapan; Alemberg Ang
- Starring: Mara Lopez; Paulo Avelino
- Cinematography: Dexter dela Peña
- Edited by: Chuck Gutierrez
- Music by: Teresa Barrozo; Jireh Pasano
- Production companies: Cinemalaya Foundation; Voyage Studios
- Release date: July 27, 2013
- Running time: 82 minutes
- Country: Philippines
- Language: Bicol

Debosyon (transl. Devotion) is a 2013 Filipino film written and directed by Alvin Yapan, starring Mara Lopez and Paulo Avelino. The film was an official entry to the 9th Cinemalaya Independent Film Festival, where it was in competition in the New Breed category but lost to Hannah Espia's Transit. It was later featured at the ReelWorld Film Festival in Toronto, where it won Honorable Mention for Outstanding International Feature.

== Cast ==
- Paulo Avelino as Mando
- Mara Lopez as Salome
- Ramona Rañeses
- Roy B. Dominguiano

== See also ==
- Oro (film)
- Transit (2013 film)
