= 30th Luna Awards =

2012 Philippine film awards ceremony

- Date: August 26, 2012
- Site: Quezon City Sports Club, Kristong Hari, Quezon City
- Hosted by: Rez Cortez; Katya Santos

Highlights
- Best Picture: Manila Kingpin: The Asiong Salonga Story
- Most awards: Manila Kingpin: The Asiong Salonga Story (6)
- Most nominations: Thelma (9)

The 30th Luna Awards were held on August 26, 2012 at the Quezon City Sports Club and they honored the best Filipino films of the year 2011.

The list of nominations were released on August 3, 2012. Thelma received the most nominations with nine. Manila Kingpin: The Asiong Salonga Story followed with eight.

Both Manila Kingpin: The Asiong Salonga Story and Thelma dominated the ceremony. The former garnered six awards, including the Best Picture while the latter won four awards.

== Winners and nominees ==
Best Picture	Best Direction
Manila Kingpin: The Asiong Salonga Story; Ang Babae sa Septic Tank; No Other Woman; Segunda Mano; Thelma; Zombadings 1: Patayin sa Shokot si Remington	Paul Soriano – Thelma; Ruel Bayani – No Other Woman; Joyce Bernal – Segunda Mano; Jade Castro – Zombadings 1: Patayin sa Shokot si Remington; Director of Manila Kingpin: The Asiong Salonga Story ^{[A]}
Best Actor	Best Actress
ER Ejercito – Manila Kingpin: The Asiong Salonga Story; Dingdong Dantes – Segunda Mano; Martin Escudero – Zombadings 1: Patayin sa Shokot si Remington; Derek Ramsay – No Other Woman; Bong Revilla – Ang Panday 2	Maja Salvador – Thelma; KC Concepcion – Forever and a Day; Eugene Domingo – Ang Babae sa Septic Tank; Lovi Poe – My Neighbor's Wife; Maricel Soriano – Yesterday, Today, Tomorrow
Best Supporting Actor	Best Supporting Actress
John Regala – Manila Kingpin: The Asiong Salonga Story; Roderick Paulate – Zombadings 1: Patayin sa Shokot si Remington; John Regala – Zombadings 1: Patayin sa Shokot si Remington; Jericho Rosales – Yesterday, Today, Tomorrow; Phillip Salvador – Ang Panday 2	Lovi Poe – Yesterday, Today, Tomorrow; Carla Abellana – My Neighbor's Wife; Tetchie Agbayani – Thelma; Liza Lorena – Presa
Best Screenplay	Best Cinematography
Froilan Medina & Paul Soriano – Thelma; Agnes de Guzman & Adolfo Alix, Jr. – Presa; Kriz Gazmen & Jay Fernando – No Other Woman; Roy Iglesias & Jay Ventura – Manila Kingpin: The Asiong Salonga Story; Chris Martinez – Ang Babae sa Septic Tank	Odyssey Flores – Thelma; Rodolfo Aves, Jr. – My House Husband: Ikaw Na!; Charlie Peralta – No Other Woman; Mo Zee – My Neighbor's Wife; Mo Zee – Yesterday, Today, Tomorrow
Best Production Design	Best Editing
Fritz Silorio & Mona Silorio – Manila Kingpin: The Asiong Salonga Story; Aped Santos – Ang Sayaw ng Dalawang Kaliwang Paa; Richard Somes – Ang Panday 2; Nina Torres – Thelma	Jason Cahapay & Ryan Orduña – Manila Kingpin: The Asiong Salonga Story; Vito Cajili – No Other Woman; Chrisel Desuasido & Augusto Salvador – Ang Panday 2; Marya Ignacio – Forever and a Day; Tara Illenberger – My Neighbor's Wife
Best Musical Score	Best Sound
Raul Mitra – No Other Woman; Archie Castillo – Thelma; Cesar Francis Concio – Forever and a Day; Vincent de Jesus – Ang Babae sa Septic Tank; Jesse Lucas – My Neighbor's Wife	Albert Michael Idioma – Manila Kingpin: The Asiong Salonga Story; Ditoy Aguila – Ang Panday 2; Aurel Claro Bilbao – Segunda Mano; Lamberto Casas, Jr. – My Neighbor's Wife; Albert Michael Idioma & Addiss Tabong – Thelma

Note:

^[A] Tikoy Aguiluz refused to take directorial credit after the producers re-shot, re-edited and re-scored the film without his knowledge and consent.

=== Special awards ===
Golden Reel Award	Fernando Poe, Jr. Lifetime Achievement Award
Dolphy	Augusto Salvador
Manuel de Leon Award for Exemplary Achievements	Lamberto Avellana Memorial Award
Jun Urbano	Joe Batac; Don Escudero; Ben Feleo

== Multiple nominations and awards ==
Nominations	Film
9	Thelma
8	Manila Kingpin: The Asiong Salonga Story
7	No Other Woman
6	My Neighbor's Wife
5	Ang Panday 2
5	Zombadings 1: Patayin sa Shokot si Remington
4	Ang Babae sa Septic Tank
4	Segunda Mano
4	Yesterday, Today, Tomorrow
3	Forever and a Day
2	Presa

Awards	Film
6	Manila Kingpin: The Asiong Salonga Story
4	Thelma
