= List of 2011 box office number-one films in the Philippines =

This is a list of films which placed number one at the weekend box office for the year 2011 in the Philippines.

== Number-one films ==
†	This implies the highest-grossing movie of the year.

#	Date	Film	Gross (Dollars)	Gross (Peso)	Notes
1	January 9, 2011	Gulliver's Travels	$522,749	N/A	
2	January 16, 2011	Gulliver's Travels	$644,318	N/A	
3	January 23, 2011	The Green Hornet	$626,260	₱27,123,195	
4	January 30, 2011	The Green Hornet	$283,945	₱12,466,037	
5	February 6, 2011	Bulong*	$763,790	₱33,261,451	
6	February 13, 2011	My Valentine Girls*	$399,950	₱17,517,810	
7	February 20, 2011	Just Go with It	$308,770	₱13,308,296	
8	February 27, 2011	I Am Number Four	$587,026	₱25,623,157	
9	March 6, 2011	Faster	$100,872	N/A	
10	March 13, 2011	The Adjustment Bureau	$146,192	₱6,349,659	The second weekend of The Adjustment Bureau had the lowest number-one weekend of 2011.
11	March 20, 2011	Battle: Los Angeles	$404,751	₱17,593,312	
12	March 27, 2011	Catch Me, I'm in Love*	$1,227,262	₱52,953,042	
13	April 3, 2011	Catch Me, I'm in Love*	$599,631	₱25,934,041	
14	April 10, 2011	Rio	$574,297	₱24,578,763	
15	April 17, 2011	Rio	$458,103	₱19,767,144	
16	April 24, 2011	Pak! Pak! My Dr. Kwak!*	$507,380	₱21,893,447	
17	May 1, 2011	Thor	$1,397,065	₱59,744,926	
18	May 8, 2011	Fast Five	$1,091,224	₱46,901,026	
19	May 15, 2011	In the Name of Love*	$1,098,179	₱47,309,551	
20	May 22, 2011	Pirates of the Caribbean: On Stranger Tides	$1,463,948	₱63,140,077	
21	May 29, 2011	Kung Fu Panda 2	$1,958,888	₱84,807,705	
22	June 5, 2011	X-Men: First Class	$1,645,650	₱71,092,080	
23	June 12, 2011	X-Men: First Class	$893,119	₱38,493,161	
24	June 19, 2011	Green Lantern	$1,651,953	₱72,051,582	
25	June 26, 2011	Green Lantern	$664,828	₱28,719,838	
26	July 3, 2011	Transformers: Dark of the Moon	$4,861,325	₱209,243,581	Transformers: Dark of the Moon had the highest weekend debut of 2011.
27	July 10, 2011	Transformers: Dark of the Moon	$2,325,399	₱99,141,061	
28	July 17, 2011	Harry Potter and the Deathly Hallows (Part 2)	$3,590,647	₱154,095,489	
29	July 24, 2011	Harry Potter and the Deathly Hallows (Part 2)	$1,635,099	₱69,295,496	
30	July 31, 2011	Captain America: The First Avenger	$2,103,025	₱88,443,978	
31	August 7, 2011	Rise of the Planet of the Apes	$754,602	₱31,937,473	
32	August 14, 2011	The Smurfs	$697,083	₱29,645,546	
33	August 21, 2011	Way Back Home*	$423,203	₱18,009,785	
34	August 28, 2011	Cars 2	$893,424	₱37,785,492	
35	September 4, 2011	Wedding Tayo, Wedding Hindi*	$388,093	₱16,336,387	
36	September 11, 2011	Contagion	$289,624	₱12,300,331	Contagion had the lowest weekend debut of 2011.
37	September 18, 2011	Johnny English Reborn	$831,448	₱35,968,440	
38	September 25, 2011	Johnny English Reborn	$574,674	₱25,010,904	
39	October 2, 2011	No Other Woman*	$2,137,432	₱93,230,509	
40	October 9, 2011	No Other Woman*	$1,268,816	₱55,015,862	
41	October 16, 2011	Real Steel	$1,097,959	₱47,475,528	
42	October 23, 2011	Real Steel	$630,186	₱27,253,024	
43	October 30, 2011	Puss in Boots	$363,337	₱15,459,989	
44	November 6, 2011	The Unkabogable Praybeyt Benjamin* †	$2,026,696	₱86,508,708	
45	November 13, 2011	The Unkabogable Praybeyt Benjamin* †	$675,565	₱29,049,295	
46	November 20, 2011	The Twilight Saga: Breaking Dawn - Part 1	$3,261,350	₱141,291,466	
49	December 11, 2011	Immortals	$390,888	₱16,994,911	
50	December 18, 2011	Mission: Impossible – Ghost Protocol	$1,361,285	₱59,420,090	
51	December 25, 2011	Mission: Impossible – Ghost Protocol	$816,889	₱35,433,051	

*means of Philippine origin.
