= Alvin Yapan =

Filipino film director

Vim Yapan, also known as Alvin Yapan, is a Filipino director.

== Filmography ==
=== Film ===
Year	Title	Film Studio	Notes
	Ang Sayaw ng Dalawang Kaliwang Paa		Best Film, Best Director and Best Screenplay at the 35th Gaward Urian Awards
2013	Debosyon		
	Gayuma: Pilgrim Lovers		
	Gaydar		
2008	Huling Pasada		entry at the 4th Cinemalaya Independent Film Festival
2007	Rolyo (short film)		Won Best Short Film at the 3rd Cinemalaya Independent Film Festival
2009	Ang Panggagahasa kay Fe		Won the Golden Award for Digital Films at the 33rd Cairo International Film Festival
2012	Mga Anino ng Kahapon		
2016	EDSA		
2016	Oro		Won Best Actress and Best Ensemble Cast at the 2016 Metro Manila Film Festival

=== Television ===
- Titser

== Books ==
In 2024, Yapan launched Worship the Body, an English translation of his novel Sambahin ang Katawan under Penguin Random House SEA.
