= Mistaken Identity (TV series) =

2011 Philippine television drama series

- Title card
- Genre: Romantic drama
- Developed by: Topel Lee
- Starring: Lovi Poe; Rocco Nacino
- Opening theme: "Jet Lag" by Simple Plan and Natasha Bedingfield
- Country of origin: Philippines
- Original language: Tagalog
- No. of episodes: 6

Production
- Executive producer: Wilma Galvante
- Camera setup: Multiple-camera setup
- Running time: 30 minutes
- Production company: GMA Entertainment TV

Original release
- Network: GMA Network
- Release: July 23 – August 27, 2011

Mistaken Identity is a 2011 Philippine television drama romance series broadcast by GMA Network. Starring Lovi Poe and Rocco Nacino, it premiered on July 23, 2011, on the network's Saturday morning line up. The series concluded on August 27, 2011, with a total of six episodes.

== Cast and characters ==
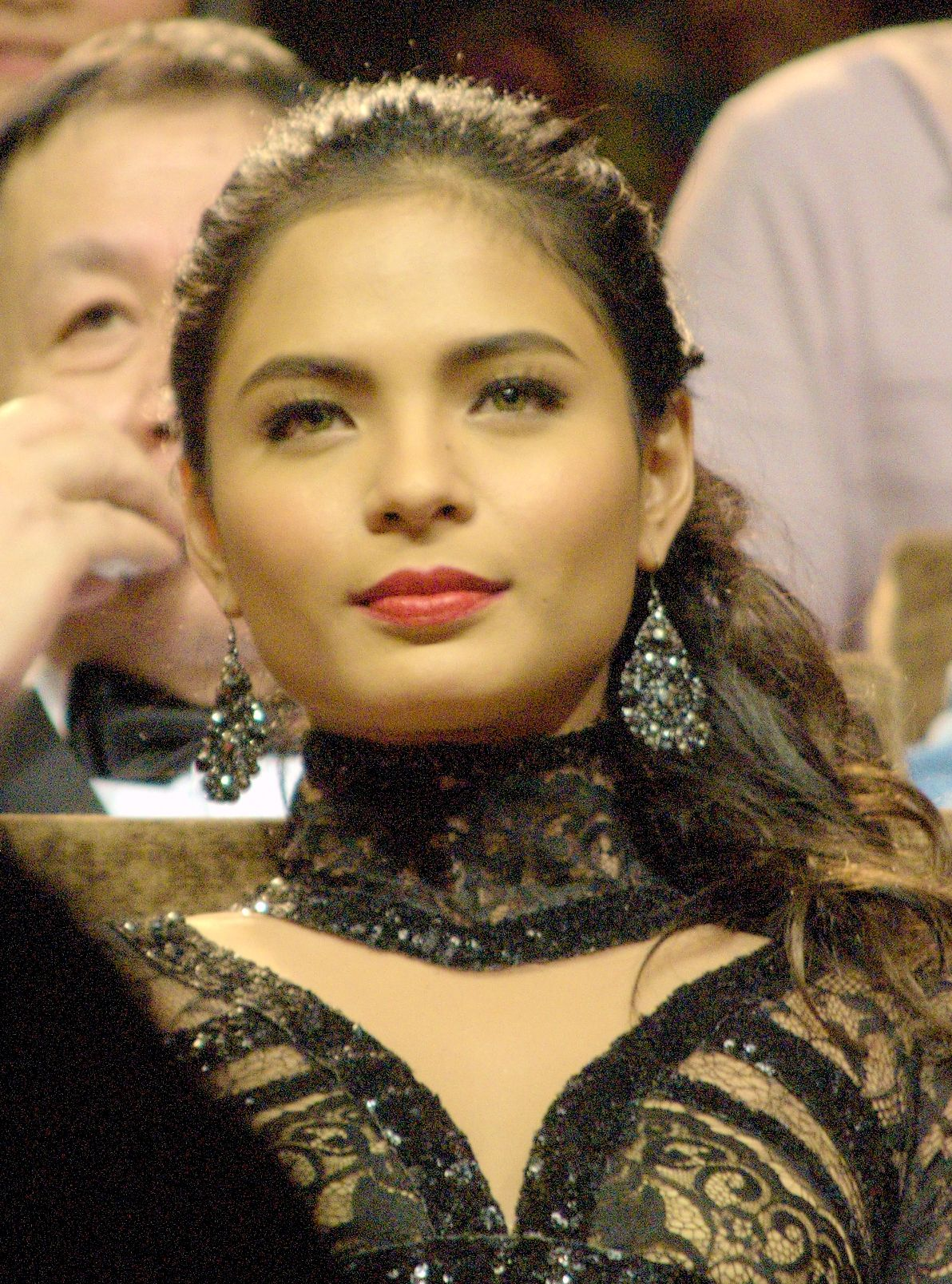
Lovi Poe portrays Ada.

Lead cast

- Lovi Poe as Ada
- Rocco Nacino as Sinag

Supporting cast

- Karel Marquez as Violeta
- Luis Alandy as Kali
- Gloria Diaz as Mercedes
- Jace Flores as Apostol
- Izzy Trazona as Mermina
- Miguel Tanfelix as Nathan
- Andrea Torres as Celia
- Evangeline Pascual as Merlinda
- G. Toengi as Miranda

== Ratings ==
According to AGB Nielsen Philippines' Mega Manila household television ratings, the pilot episode of Mistaken Identity earned a 14.2% rating. The final episode scored a 6.5% rating in Mega Manila People/Individual television ratings.
