= 41st Luna Awards =

Luna Awards ceremony

- Date: December 10, 2026
- Site: Manila Hotel, Manila, Philippines

The 41st Luna Awards ceremony, presented by the Film Academy of the Philippines (FAP), is scheduled to take place on December 10, 2026, at the Manila Hotel.

== Key dates ==
Upcoming dates leading up to the 41st Luna Awards
Date	Event
November 12	Nominations voting ends
TBD	Nominations announced
TBD	Final voting begins
TBD	Final voting ends
December 10	Ceremony

== Ceremony information ==
On November 13, 2026, the film academy announced the return of the Luna Awards ceremony following a two-year break. It will take place on December 10 at the Manila Hotel. A new design for the statuette is set to be unveiled at the ceremony.

=== Rule and eligibility changes ===
The Academy announced in December 2025 that the Luna Awards will be taking a break that year to give way to a restructuring, particularly in its voting system to emphasize the peer-voting aspect of the Academy. On November 13, 2026, the Academy formally introduced the following changes:

- The eligibility calendar for all categories is set from October 2025 to September 2026, moving from the previous calendar of the preceding year (from January to December). This is to shift from the previous practice of honoring films from the preceding calendar year to becoming the capstone awards of each awards season, allowing the ceremony to honor films "currently being experienced, discussed, and celebrated."
- A new system designed to ensure "broader, fairer selection" that gives all members of the academy more direct role in the awards was also introduced. The process starts with a preliminary period in which selected film critics, academics, and organizations cite standout films for the shortlist prior to the nomination process. All voting members then vote from the shortlist for the categories in their respective "sectors" (similar to AMPAS' "branches") to determine the final nominees. All voting members then vote again for the winners, this time, on all categories despite their branches. The Single Transferable Vote (SVT) preferential system and Droop quota formula will be introduced this year.
- More than 2,000 members of the Academy will vote this year, the highest since the Academy's adoption of the peer-voting model.
- Special citations for the outstanding films of 2024 and 2025 will be handed out in this year's ceremony to accommodate films released during the break period of the awards.
