= Lovi Poe =

Filipino artist and singer (born 1991)

- Poe in 2026
- Born: Lourdes Virginia Moran Poe; February 11, 1991 (age 35); Quezon City, Philippines
- Occupations: Actress; singer; model; film and television producer
- Years active: 2005–present
- Agent(s): GMA Network (2006–2020); ABS-CBN Corporation (2021–present); Star Magic (2026–present)
- Spouse: Montgomery Blencowe (m. 2023)
- Children: 1
- Father: Fernando Poe Jr.
- Relatives: Grace Poe (half-sister); Susan Roces (stepmother); Fernando Poe Sr. (grandfather); Andy Poe (uncle); Conrad Poe (uncle); Brian Poe Llamanzares (half-nephew)
- Musical career
- Genre: Pop
- Instruments: Vocals; guitar; piano
- Label: Sony-BMG

Lourdes Virginia "Lovi" Moran Poe (born February 11, 1991) is a Filipino actress. She is the daughter of action star Fernando Poe Jr.

She is known for starring in two popular drama series on the GMA Network: Bakekang (2006) as Kristal and Ang Dalawang Mrs. Real (2014) as Shiela. She received her first Best Actress award in the 2010 Cinemalaya Independent Film Festival for the film Mayohan, where she played Lilibeth. That same year, she was also a FAMAS Best Actress awardee for the film Sagrada Familia for playing Kath Asero. She also starred as Mersila in the film Thy Womb (2012), which was an entry into the 69th Venice International Film Festival.

On September 16, 2021, Poe transferred to ABS-CBN Corporation after 14 years with GMA which later signed with its talent agency Star Magic five years later in July 21, 2026. In 2023, she founded the film production company C'est Lovi Productions.

== Early life and education ==
Lourdes Virginia Moran Poe was born on February 11, 1991, at St. Luke's Medical Center in Quezon City. She was born from a brief relationship between Filipino actors Fernando Poe Jr., and Rowena Moran, who was his co-star in Kapag Puno Na ang Salop (1987). As her father was married to Susan Roces, Poe was raised by Moran as a single mother. She was publicly acknowledged by her father in 2004 during his presidential campaign. Through her father, she has two older siblings, politician Grace and DJ Ronian, and through her mother, she has a younger sister, Mariel.

Poe finished high school at the Colegio San Agustin in Makati where she graduated in 2007. She then later took courses at the International Academy of Management and Economics and Miriam College. Poe was also a classmate of Bela Padilla.

== Career ==
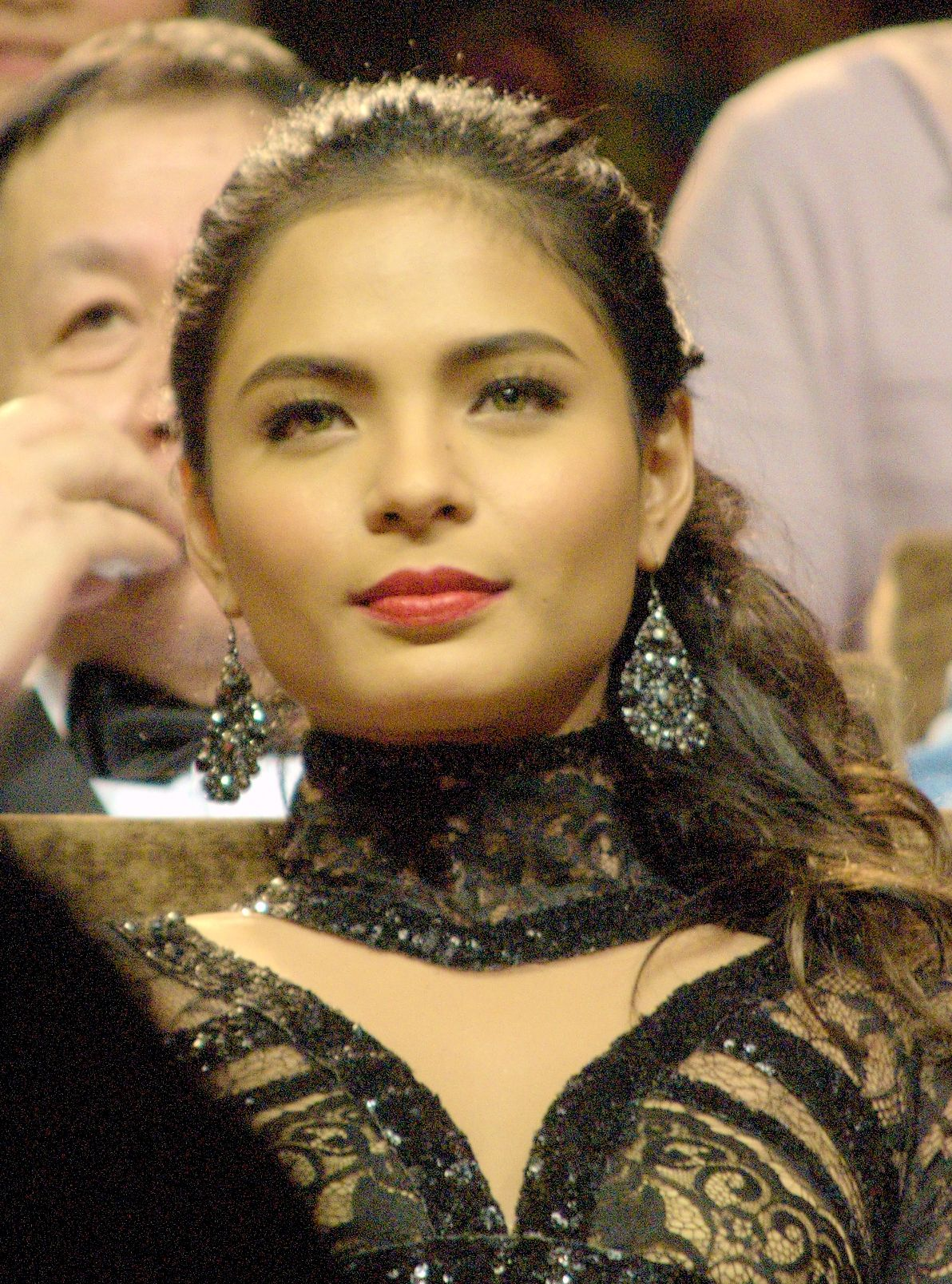
Poe at the 69th Venice International Film Festival, September 2012

In 2006, Poe was handpicked by an international singing duo named Same Same to perform with them the song "Without You," which is included in the duo's debut album The Meaning of Happy. She was then first paired with Cogie Domingo in the youth-oriented drama Love to Love. Her biggest acting break came when she played the character of Kristal Maisog in the hit 2006 drama, Bakekang. Her co-star Sunshine Dizon pushed her to join show business as an actress. Her acting performance in Bakekang gained critical praise and was named as Best New Female TV Personality in the 21st PMPC Star Awards for Television. In 2007, Poe was cast in Zaido: Pulis Pangkalawakan (a Philippine spin-off of Shaider) as a newspaper journalist who is a close friend of policeman Alexis Lorenzo (played by Marky Cielo) who turned into the superhero Zaido Green.

In 2008, she played another starring role in the character of Joanna on the afternoon drama, Sine Novela: Kaputol ng Isang Awit, alongside Glaiza de Castro, Marky Cielo and Jolo Revilla.

In 2008, she won the New Movie Actress of the Year award in the 24th PMPC Star Awards for Movies for the film Shake, Rattle and Roll 9. She was also part of the Gabby Concepcion 20-city tour which started on August 17, 2008. Her Bloom solo concert at the Music Museum in San Juan, Metro Manila, was held on October 16. Bloom is also the title of her second album under SonyBMG. She was also cast in the film Paukay-Ukay by Regal Entertainment. She also co-starred in LaLola (2008) and Ang Babaeng Hinugot sa Aking Tadyang (2009).

Poe appeared on the TV5 youth-oriented drama Lipgloss; GMA Network previously did not allow her to join the series as per network policy stating their contract talents be exclusive to their network. Her manager, Leo Dominguez, defended their move saying that "Lovi does not have an existing contract with GMA." Since then, Poe has not appeared in any of GMA Network shows. It was also reported that she entertained offers from GMA's rival network ABS-CBN, until her manager decided to accept GMA's offer to cast Poe in the new sitcom Show Me Da Manny. In 2010, she was a regular host on the GMA Sunday noontime variety show Party Pilipinas. In July 2010, she appeared in the independent film Mayohan for which she won her first acting award, the Cinemalaya Independent Film Festival Award for Best Actress.

After 15 years with GMA Network, Poe moved to ABS-CBN on September 16, 2021. Her first television drama project was the Philippine adaptation of Flower of Evil with Piolo Pascual. She has since launched her own production company, C'est Lovi Productions, in partnership with her eventual husband, Montgomery Blencowe, as an executive. It was announced on July 23, 2026, that her production company produced Lav Diaz's Let Us Through, Dear Ancestors, which will premiere at the 83rd Venice International Film Festival. In 2023, she received her first screenwriter credit for the Netflix film Seasons, which Carlo Aquino starred as a lead with Poe.

Poe is part of the cast of the American independent film Bad Man directed by Michael Diliberti, which released in 2025. She was previously cast in The Chelsea Cowboy and My Sister's Bones, with the later released in January 2026, where she leads opposite Olga Kurylenko. She has since joined the Disney+ show Armorsaurs for Season 2 premiering in 2027.

Poe finished her filmmaking of Regal Entertainment's Guilty Pleasure, a drama thriller directed by Connie Macatuno and written by Noreen Capili. She renewed her contract with Gracee Angles' skin care Eevor Skin Care Depot (SCD), as celebrity endorser since 2022.

== Personal life ==
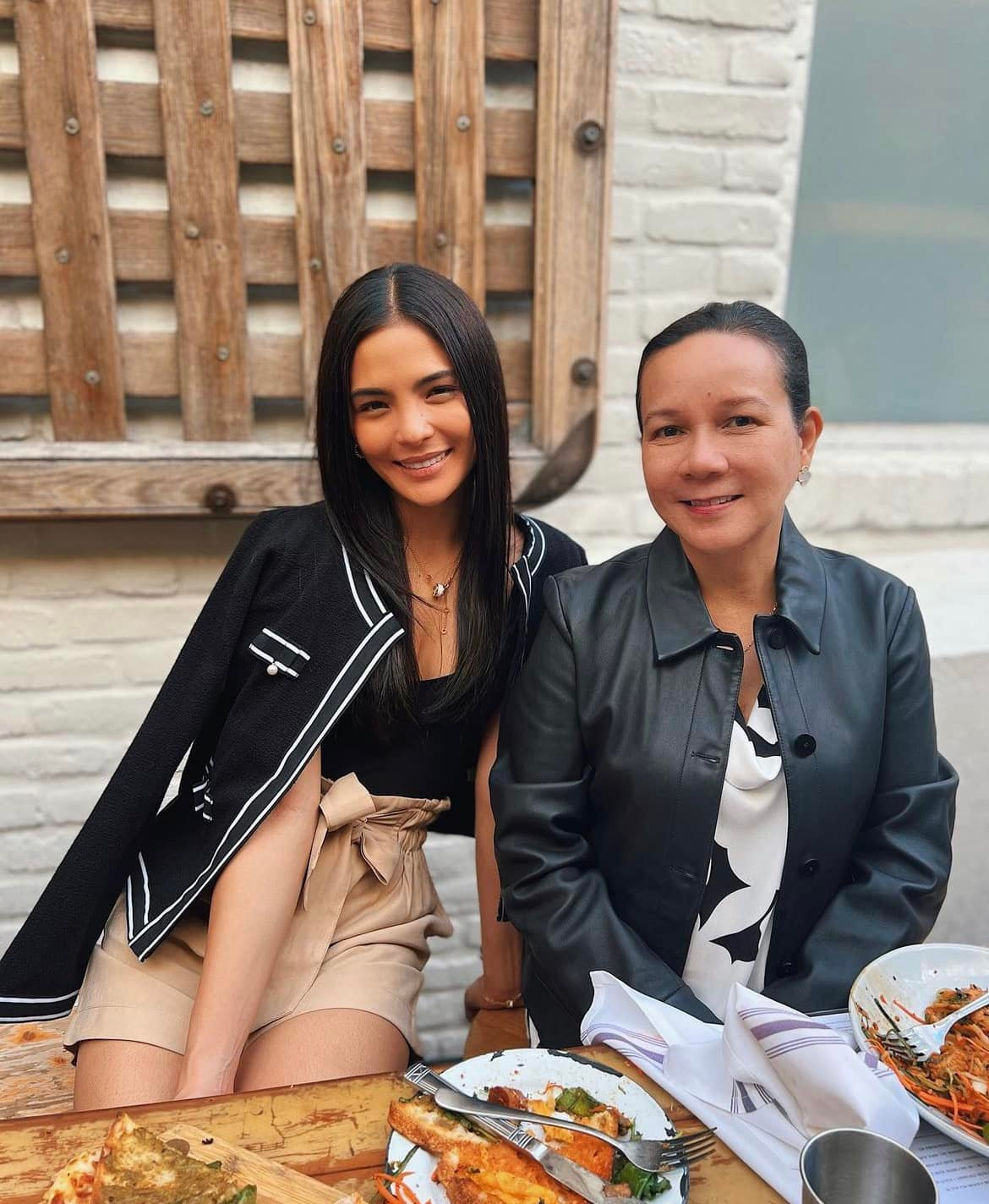
Poe and her half-sister, Grace Poe, in 2022

Poe endorsed her sister Grace in the 2016 presidential election and the 2019 senatorial election, sometimes joining her in campaign sorties.

On August 26, 2023, Poe married British film producer Monty Blencowe at Cliveden House near Berkshire, England. They announced their engagement publicly on August 8, 2023. The couple has residences in London, United Kingdom, and Los Angeles, United States. On September 1, 2025, retailer Bench launched an advertisement campaign featuring a pregnant Poe, revealing that she and Blencowe were expecting their first child. On October 24, she announced that she had given birth via an Instagram post quoting "The moment I met you, instinct took over. Welcome to the world, my love".

== Discography ==
=== Studio albums ===
- The Best of My Heart (2006, Musiko/Sony BMG)
- Bloom (2008, Musiko/Sony BMG)

=== Singles ===
- "Tayong Dalawa" (Bakekang theme song) (2006)
- "Kung Pwede Lang" (2006)
- "I Never Knew Love" (2006)
- "Alone" (2006). Written by: Anthony Kirby D. Garcia, Music by: Janno Queyquep
- "I Love You" (2006)
- "Sana" (2008)
- "Nais Ko" (Kaputol ng Isang Awit theme song) with Glaiza de Castro (2008)
- "Dito sa Puso" (Wanted: Perfect Family theme song) (2009)
- "Suddenly It's Magic" (My Valentine Girls theme song) (2011)
- "Love Affair" (featuring Viktoria Vixen) (2013)
- "Even If" (The Bride and the Lover theme song) (2013)
- "Huwag Kang Mangako" (Akin Pa Rin ang Bukas theme song) (2013)
- "Lifetime" (Seasons theme song) (2023)
- "Panaginip" (Seasons theme song) (2023)

==== As a featured artist ====
- "Without You" (2006, Same Same)
- "Lov na Lov" (2007, Gloc-9)
- "One Night, One Kiss" (2016, JC de Vera)

=== Concerts ===
- Bloom (2008, Music Museum)
- Fantaisie (2016, Music Museum)

== Filmography ==
=== Film ===
Year	Title	Role	Notes	Ref.
2007	Shake, Rattle and Roll 9	Hazel	Supporting role	
2009	Walang Hanggang Paalam	Maria	Leading role with Jacky Woo	
2009	Sagrada Familia	Kath Asero	Supporting role	
2010	Sigwa	young Azon	Special Participation	
2010	Mayohan	Lilibeth	Leading role with Elijah Castillo	
2010	White House	April	Supporting role	
2011	My Valentine Girls	Ruby	Supporting role	
2011	Joey Gosiengfiao's Temptation Island	Serafina L.	Main cast	
2011	My Neighbor's Wife	Giselle Perez	Leading role with Carla Abellana	
2011	Aswang	Hasmin	Leading role with Paulo Avelino	
2011	Deadline: The Reign of Impunity	Greta Manarang	Supporting role	
2011	Yesterday, Today, Tomorrow	Lori	Supporting role	
2012	Guni-Guni	Mylene	Leading role with Benjamin Alves	
2012	Tiktik: The Aswang Chronicles	Sonia	Leading role with Dingdong Dantes	
2012	Shake, Rattle and Roll Fourteen: The Invasion	Kate	Leading role with Vhong Navarro	
2012	Thy Womb	Mersila	Leading role with Nora Aunor	
2013	The Bride and the Lover	Vivian Paredes	Leading role with Jennylyn Mercado	
2013	Sana Dati	Andrea	Leading role with Paulo Avelino	
2013	Talamak	—N/a	Supporting role	
2013	Lihis	Ka Jasmine	Leading role with Jake Cuenca	
2013	Status: It's Complicated	Charlene	Cameo role	
2013	Kimmy Dora: Ang Kiyemeng Prequel	—N/a	Cameo role	
2014	Soap Opera	Liza	Leading role with Rocco Nacino	
2014	Shake, Rattle & Roll XV	Karen	Leading role with Matteo Guidicelli	
2015	Lakambini	Gregoria de Jesus	Leading role with Gina Pareño	
2016	The Escort	Yassi	Leading role with Derek Ramsay	
2017	Woke Up Like This	Sabrina Rodriguez; Nando Cruz	Leading role with Vhong Navarro	
2018	The Significant Other	Maxene de Vera	Leading role with Tom Rodriguez and Erich Gonzales	
2019	The Annulment	Gari	Leading role with Joem Bascon	
2020	Hindi Tayo Pwede	Gabby / Gabs	Leading role with Tony Labrusca and Marco Gumabao	
2020	Malaya	Malaya	Leading role with Zanjoe Marudo	
2021	The Other Wife	Janis	Leading role with Joem Bascon and Rhen Escaño	
2023	Seasons	Charlie	Leading role with Carlo Aquino, also writer (Note: The film was written by Poe herself, and her writing role is credited under her real name "Lourdes Virginia Moran Poe" rather than her screen name. Her acting role however is credited under her screen name.)	
2024	Guilty Pleasure	Alexis Miranda	Leading role with JM de Guzman and Jameson Blake, also producer	
2025	Bad Man	Izzy	Leading role with Seann William Scott, Johnny Simmons, Chance Perdomo, and Rob Riggle	
2026	My Sister's Bones	Frida	Main cast with Olga Kurylenko, Ben Miles, Anna Friel	
TBA	Ignition	TBD	Leading role with Maisie Williams and Rory Kinnear	
TBA	The Sacrifice	Gail	Leading role with Timothy Granaderos	

=== Television series ===
Year	Title	Role	Ref.
2006–2007	Carlo J. Caparas' Bakekang	Kristal Maisog	
2007–2008	Zaido: Pulis Pangkalawakan	Mona Langit	
2008	Sine Novela: Kaputol ng Isang Awit	Joanna Ambrosio	
2008–2009	LaLola	Julia Fuentebella	
2009	Carlo J. Caparas' Ang Babaeng Hinugot sa Aking Tadyang	Athena	
2009	Lipgloss	Princess Ava	
2010	Bantatay	Shih-Tzu (voice over)	
2010	Beauty Queen	young Amparo	
2010–2011	Little Star	Gwyneth Cordova	
2011	Mars Ravelo's Captain Barbell	Althea	
2011	Mistaken Identity	Ada	
2012	Legacy	Natasha Alcantara	
2012–2013	Yesterday's Bride	Andrea Manalo / Lorraine Agustin	
2013	Titser	Michelle Maturan	
2013	Akin Pa Rin ang Bukas	Lovelia Villacorta	
2014	Ang Dalawang Mrs. Real	Sheila Salazar-Real	
2015	Beautiful Strangers	Jocelyn "Joyce" Rodriguez / Leah	
2016	A1 Ko Sa 'Yo	Sandra	
2016–2017	Someone to Watch Over Me	Joanna Mercado-Chavez	
2017	Mulawin vs. Ravena	D'yosang Magindara	
2018	The One That Got Away	Alexandra Rey "Alex" Makalintal-Illustre	
2018	Inday Will Always Love You	Lovejoy Dimalanta	
2019	Beautiful Justice	Herself	
2020	Anak ni Waray vs. Anak ni Biday	young Sussie Agpangan	
2020	I Can See You: High-Rise Lovers	Samantha "Sam" Alvarez	
2021	Owe My Love	Pacencia "Sensen" Guipit	
2022	Flower of Evil	Iris Castillo del Rosario	
2022	Sleep with Me	Luna	
2023–2024	FPJ's Batang Quiapo	Monique "Mokang" Dimaculangan-Frias / Montenegro†	
2026	Armorsaurs	TBD	

==== Television shows ====
Year	Title	Role	Ref.
2006–2010	SOP	Herself (co-host / performer)	
2009–2011	Show Me Da Manny	Hannah Montano	
2010–2013	Party Pilipinas	Herself (co-host / performer)	
2013–2015	Sunday All Stars	Herself (co-host / performer)	
2021–present	ASAP	Herself (performer)	
2024–present	It's Showtime	Herself (guest judge / performer)	
2024	TV Patrol Express	Herself (guest star patroller)	
2024	TV Patrol	Herself (guest star patroller)	

==== Drama anthologies ====
Year	Title	Role	Episode	Ref.
2018	Magpakailanman	Raquel	Ang Asawang Naging Kabit	
2017	Tadhana	Ma'am Pia Gonzales	Titser	
2017	Karelasyon	Alma	Bugso	
2017	Dear Uge	Diana	Bes at Plastikan	
2016	Dear Uge	Rica	Soap Opera Sisters	
2016	Magpakailanman	Jack	Dalawang Babae, Isang Anak	
2015	Magpakailanman	Beverly Grimaldo	The Beverly Grimaldo Story: Apoy ng Pangarap	
2014	Magpakailanman	Arlene dela Cruz	The Arlene dela Cruz Story: Krimen sa Ngalan ng Puri	
2014	Magpakailanman	Emily	My Psychotic Husband	
2013	Magpakailanman	Elsa de Guzman	The Elsa de Guzman Story: Gang Rape	
2015	Karelasyon	Marose	Scandal	
2015	Wagas	Annie Ayroso	Time Heals All Wounds	
2014	Wagas	Clarence	Laro-Laro?	
2011	Spooky Nights Presents	Maria	Sanggol	
2010	Love Bug Presents	Faye	Say I Do	
2008	Obra	—N/a	Rehas	
2007	Mga Kuwento ni Lola Basyang	Maria Alimango	Maria Alimango	
2006	Love to Love	Jass	Jass Got Lucky	

==== TV specials ====
Year	Title	Role	Notes	Ref.
2012	Pinagpala sa Babaeng Lahat	—N/a	APT Entertainment lenten special with James Blanco	
2015	Pabangon: Tacloban A Lenten Special	—N/a	APT Entertainment lenten special	

== Accolades ==
Year	Film award / Critics	Recipient / Nominated work	Award	Result	Ref.
2006	SOP Music Awards	Herself	Breakthrough Artist of the Year	Won	
2007	PMPC Star Awards for Television	Bakekang	Best New Female TV Personality (Tied with Kim Chiu)	Won	
2008	PMPC Star Awards for Movies	Shake, Rattle and Roll 9	New Movie Actress of the Year	Won	
2008	PMPC Star Awards for Television	Kaputol ng Isang Awit	Best Drama Actress	Nominated	
2010	Cinemalaya Independent Film Festival	Mayohan	Best Actress	Won	
2010	Golden Screen Awards	Sagrada Familia	Best Performance by an Actress in a Leading Role (Drama)	Nominated	
2010	FAMAS Awards	Sagrada Familia	Best Actress	Won	
2011	PMPC Star Awards for Movies	Mayohan	Movie Actress of the Year	Nominated	
2011	Golden Screen Awards	Mayohan	Best Performance by an Actress in a Leading Role-Drama	Won	
2012	Golden Screen Awards	Temptation Island	Best Performance by an Actress in a Leading Role (Musical or Comedy)	Nominated	
2012	PMPC Star Awards for Movies	Yesterday, Today, Tomorrow	Movie Supporting Actress of the Year	Won	
2012	PMPC Star Awards for Movies	My Neighbor's Wife	Movie Actress of The Year	Nominated	
2012	Luna Awards	My Neighbor's Wife	Best Actress	Nominated	
2012	Luna Awards	Yesterday, Today, Tomorrow	Best Supporting Actress	Won	
2013	Golden Screen TV Awards	Legacy	Outstanding Performance by an Actress in a Drama Series	Nominated	
2013	Gawad Pasado Awards	Thy Womb	Pinakapasadong Katuwang na Aktres	Won	
2014	PEP List Awards	Herself	Female Fab of the Year (PEPsters' Choice)	Won	
2014	Golden Screen Awards	Sana Dati	Best Performance by an Actress in a Leading Role-Drama	Nominated	
2014	FAPSA Awards	Titser	Lead Artist Special Recognition (With Agot Isidro)	Won	
2014	PMPC Star Awards for Television	Best Drama Actress	Ang Dalawang Mrs. Real	Nominated	
2015	Golden Screen TV Awards	Outstanding Performance by an Actress in a Drama Program	Ang Dalawang Mrs. Real	Nominated	
2020	3rd Gawad Lasallianeta 2020	Magpakailanman: Ang Asawang Naging Kabit	Most Outstanding TV Performance by an Actress	Won	
2021	Gawad Urian Award	Malaya	Best Actress	Nominated	
2021	FAMAS Award	Latay	Best Actress	Nominated	
2022	19th Gawad Tanglaw	Latay	Best Actress	Won	
2022	PMPC Star Awards for Movies	Malaya	Movie Actress of the Year	Nominated	
2024	Gawad Urian Award	Guilty Pleasure	Best Actress	Nominated	
2024	PMPC Star Awards for Movies	Guilty Pleasure	Movie Actress of the Year	Nominated	
