= Rocco Nacino =

Filipino actor and professional wrestler (born 1987)

- Born: Enrico Raphael Quiogue Nacino; March 21, 1987 (age 39); Baguio, Philippines
- Education: Mapúa University; St. Bernadette of Lourdes College
- Occupations: Actor; model; registered nurse; Military Officer
- Years active: 2004–present
- Agent: GMA Artist Center (2009–present)
- Height: 5 ft 7 in (170 cm)
- Spouse: Melissa Gohing (m. 2021)
- Children: 2
- Awards: StarStruck V – 2nd Prince; 9th Golden Screen Awards for Breakthrough Performance by an Actor; 28th PMPC Star Awards for Movies – New Movie Actor
- Military career
- Allegiance: Philippines
- Branch: Philippine Navy; Navy Reserve Command
- Service years: 2023–present
- Rank: Second Lieutenant

Enrico Raphael Quiogue Nacino (born March 21, 1987), known professionally as Rocco Nacino (Tagalog: [ˈɾɔkɔ naˈsinɔ]), is a Filipino actor and nurse. He won the title of Second Prince in the fifth season of StarStruck. He is an exclusive artist under GMA Artist Center.

== Early life and education ==
Enrico Raphael Quiogue Nacino was born on March 21, 1987 in Baguio to Ralph Nacino, a talent manager and Linda Nacino. He was raised in Singapore and Laguna, his father's hometown. Nacino has only one sibling, his brother Kyle, an industrial engineer.

He studied Nursery up to Primary 6 in Singapore, and also learned to speak Mandarin during his grade school days. He received his secondary education in Makati Hope Christian School. Nacino pursued his tertiary education with a degree of Bachelor of Science in Nursing in Mapúa Institute of Technology. He passed the Philippine Nurse Licensure Examination in June 2009 in Manila.

Nacino continued his post-graduate degree studies and took up Master of Arts in Nursing at St. Bernadette of Lourdes College where he graduated as Cum Laude in 2017.

== Career ==
=== Entertainment career ===
Nacino joined the Myx VJ Search in 2007 but failed to win. He then joined Star Struck V and won as the 2nd Prince.

His biggest break on television was when he bagged a role in Sine Novela Presents: Gumapang Ka sa Lusak, opposite Jennylyn Mercado and Dennis Trillo. This was followed by another teleserye at GMA Network’s Dramarama sa Hapon block, Koreana, with Kris Bernal as his love interest. His performance in Koreana gave him his first acting nomination from the Entertainment Press Society (Enpres) as Finalist for Outstanding Performance by an Actor for the Golden TV Awards in 2011. With the large viewership and high ratings garnered by Koreana, Nacino was given a more challenging project in the first-ever dance serye Time of My Life, with Kris Bernal and Mark Herras.

He was part of the weekly fantasy sitcom, Kaya ng Powers, with Rhian Ramos, Sheena Halili, Elmo Magalona, Joey Marquez and Rufa Mae Quinto. He also did a cameo in the finale week of Amaya, where he played the role of Adult Banuk. He also top-billed a 5-episode weekly series, Love Bug presents: Mistaken Identity, where he was paired with Lovi Poe.

Nacino's first indie film was an entry at the 2011 Cinemalaya Film Festival, Ang Sayaw ng Dalawang Kaliwang Paa, with Paulo Avelino and Jean Garcia, where he showcased his acting capabilities and earned his first prestigious acting awards when he was chosen by the Philippine Movie Press Club as the "New Movie Actor of the Year" in the 28th PMPC Star Awards for Movies; and by the Entertainment Press Society (Enpres) as "Best Breakthrough Performance by an Actor" in the 9th Golden Screen Awards. Nacino also did cameo roles in the movies My Valentine Girls and My Kontrabida Girl. He also played the brother of Judy Ann Santos at the 37th Metro Manila Film Festival, My House Husband: Ikaw Na!, directed by Jose Javier Reyes.

He portrayed the Philippines' national hero Jose Rizal in Howie Severino's multi-awarded documentary Pluma: Ang Dakilang Manunulat. The documentary was nominated as Best Documentary at the New York Film Festival. He then starred in The Good Daughter, opposite Kylie Padilla. He also played the title role, Lam-ang – an epic movie that was shot in Ilocos, with Rochelle Pangilinan as his leading lady. He also appears weekly in Party Pilipinas and Bubble Gang.

His indie film, I Love You, Pare Ko, opposite to Rodjun Cruz, was released in 2012.

=== Modeling ===
During his first year of college at Mapua Makati, he participated in the Mister and Miss Cardinals and won as Mister Cardinals 2005. This opened new opportunities for him to appear on TV commercials and print media. Among his projects were endorsements for Vaseline, Skyflakes, Goya, Jollibee, Chowking, Smart, Pepsi and STI.

=== Mixed Martial Arts ===
Nacino is a Jujitsu athlete. He has won several awards in Mixed Martial Arts competitions.

He won a gold medal in International Brazilian Jiu-Jitsu Federation Championship in 2017. Nacino also won silver medal and bronze medal at the Rollapalooza Jiu-jitsu Tournament in 2018.

=== Professional wrestling ===
On September 15, 2025, Nacino made his professional wrestling debut at Filipino Pro Wrestling's Unfinished Business event against Thiago "The Gym Bro" Santiago.

== Military ==
He was promoted into 2nd Lieutenant of Reserve Force in the Armed Forces of the Philippines. On April 9, 2023, he became an honorary Naval Special Operations Command member after spending four years as a naval military reservist with the unit.

== Personal life ==
Nacino is a nephew of the late Manuel Quiogue, former president and COO of GMA Marketing and Productions, Inc.. His sports are jiujitsu, muay thai, mixed martial arts, boxing, arnis and basketball. He also trains wing chun regularly. He also plays drums and a little of guitar.

=== Relationship and family ===
After 3 years of dating, Nacino proposed to Melissa Gohing on November 20, 2020, in Antipolo City. The couple got married on January 21, 2021, aboard a naval ship. His wife gave birth to their son, Ezren Raffaello Gohing Nacino on October 9, 2022.

In March 2026, Nacino and his wife announced the birth of their second baby, Elyon Azriel Gohing Nacino.

== Filmography ==
=== Film ===
Year	Title	Role
2011	My Valentine Girls	Marvin
2011	Ang Sayaw ng Dalawang Kaliwang Paa	Dennis
2011	Tween Academy: Class of 2012	Cameo
2011	My House Husband: Ikaw Na!	Erik
2012	My Kontrabida Girl	Cameo
2012	Madaling Araw Mahabang Gabi	Roland
2013	I Luv U, Pare Ko	Sam
2013	My Lady Boss	Henry Posadas Enrile
2013	Pedro Calungsod: Batang Martir	Pedro Calungsod
2014	Hustisya	Atty. Gerald
2015	Balut Country	Jun
2015	Flotsam	Tisoy
2017	Bar Boys	Torran Garcia
2019	Write About Love	Male Writer
2025	Bar Boys: After School	Prof. Torran Garcia

=== Television ===
Year	Title	Role
2005	On-Air Tambayan	Himself / Guest
2009–2010	StarStruck V	Himself / Contestant / Second Prince
2009–2010	SOP Fully Charged	Himself / Performer
2010	Sine Novela: Gumapang Ka Sa Lusak	RJ Guatlo
2010–2013	Party Pilipinas	Himself / Performer
2010	Bubble Gang	Himself / Performer
2010	Kaya ng Powers	Clinton Llib
2010–2011	Koreana	Benjamin "Benjo" Bautista Jr.
2010	Puso ng Pasko: Artista Challenge	Challenger
2011	Maestra	Kiko
2011	Maynila: Bestfriends & A Girl	Bogs
2011	PLUMA: Rizal, Ang Dakilang Manunulat	Jose Rizal
2011	Mistaken Identity	Sinag
2011	Time of My Life	Jason
2012	Amaya	Adult Banuk
2012	The Good Daughter	Darwin Alejandro
2012	Makapiling Kang Muli	Ferdinand
2012–2013	Yesterday's Bride	Justin Ramirez
2012	Aha!	Himself / Guest Host
2013	Unforgettable	Terrence Rosario
2013	Bayan Ko	Joseph Santiago
2013–2015	Sunday All Stars	Himself / Performer
2013	Titser	Joseph Santiago
2013	Akin Pa Rin ang Bukas	Gerardo "Jerry" Sebastian
2013–2014	Out of Control	Himself / Co-host
2013	Wagas: The Jiggy and Marnie Manicad Love Story	Jiggy Manicad
2014	Magpakailanman: Ama Ina Anak	Marlon
2014–2015	Hiram na Alaala	Joseph Corpuz
2015	Ang Lihim ni Annasandra	Reneé
2015	Eat Bulaga Lenten Special: Pangako ng Pag-ibig	Michael
2015	Karelasyon	Eric
2015	Magpakailanman: Alab ng Puso	Nicky DC. Nacino
2015	Beautiful Strangers	Noel Ilagan
2016	Dear Uge: 2nd Mom ko si ma'am!	Miguel Sandoval
2016	Dear Uge: Ang triplets ng Tres Marias	Adam / Elmer / Brian
2016–2017	Encantadia	Aquil
2017	Magpakailanman: Losing Jeffrey, Finding Jayson	Jayson Tomas / Jeffrey
2017–2018	Haplos	Gerald Cortez / John "Janjan" Montecines
2017	Alaala: A Martial Law Special	Jose "Pete" Lacaba
2018	Tadhana	Roger
2018	Pamilya Roces	Hugo Javellana
2020	Descendants of the Sun	Diego Ramos
2020	Imbestigador	Mike Enriquez
2021	Owe My Love	Kenneth Paul
2021	To Have & to Hold	Gavin Ramirez
2022	First Lady	Moises Valentin
2022–2023	Maria Clara at Ibarra	Elias
2023	The Missing Husband	Antonino "Anton" Rosales / Lemuel
2024	Lilet Matias: Attorney-at-Law	Samson Guerrero
2025	Lolong: Bayani ng Bayan	Flavio Elustrisimo (antagonist)
2025	Mommy Dearest	Dr. Logan Alvarez (antagonist)
2025–2026	Encantadia Chronicles: Sang'gre	Aquil
2025	It's Showtime	Judge of Showtime Sexy Babe season 2
2026	Stars on the Floor	Himself / Contestant

== Accolades ==
Awards and NominationsAwards and nominations received by Rocco Nacino
Award	Year	Category	Nominated work	Result	Ref.
Box-Office Entertainment Awards	2012	Most Promising Male Star of the Year	—N/a	Won	
FAMAS Awards	2015	Best Actor	Hustisya	Nominated	
FMTM Awards	2012	Daytime Prince	—N/a	Won	
17th Gawad PASADO Awards	2015	Pinakapasadong Katuwang na Aktor	Hustisya	Nominated	
Golden Screen TV Awards	2011	Outstanding Breakthrough Performance by an Actor	Koreana	Nominated	
Golden Screen TV Awards	2014	Outstanding Performance by an Actor in a Single Drama/Telemovie Program	San Pedro Calungsod	Nominated	
9th Golden Screen Awards	2012	Breakthrough Performance by an Actor	Ang Sayaw ng Dalawang Kaliwang Paa	Won	
Metro Manila Film Festival	2013	Best Actor	Pedro Calungsod: Batang Martir	Nominated	
Metro Manila Film Festival	2019	Best Actor	Write About Love	Nominated	
PMPC Star Awards for Movies	2012	New Movie Actor of the Year	Ang Sayaw ng Dalawang Kaliwang Paa	Won	
PMPC Star Awards for Television	2017	German Moreno Power Tandem Award (with Sanya Lopez)	—N/a	Won	
RAWR Awards	2020	Beshie Ng Taon	Descendants of the Sun	Nominated	
StarStruck V	2010	Second Prince	StarStruck V	Won	
Yahoo! OMG Awards	2012	Most Promising Actor of the Year	—N/a	Nominated	
