= Joey Gosiengfiao's Temptation Island =

- Directed by: Chris Martinez
- Screenplay by: Chris Martinez
- Story by: Toto Belano
- Based on: Temptation Island by Joey Gosiengfiao
- Produced by: Jose Mari Abacan
- Starring: Marian Rivera; Heart Evangelista; Rufa Mae Quinto; Lovi Poe; Solenn Heussaff; John Lapus; Dennis Trillo; Tom Rodriguez; Aljur Abrenica; Mikael Daez
- Cinematography: Gary Gardoce
- Edited by: Vanessa Ubas de Leon
- Music by: Von de Guzman
- Production company: GMA Films
- Distributed by: Regal Entertainment; GMA Films
- Release date: July 6, 2011
- Running time: 115 minutes
- Country: Philippines
- Languages: Filipino; English
- Box office: ₱61 million

Joey Gosiengfiao's Temptation Island, or simply Temptation Island, is a 2011 Philippine comedy drama film directed by Chris Martinez and starring Marian Rivera, Rufa Mae Quinto, Heart Evangelista, Lovi Poe, and Solenn Heussaff. The film co-stars John Lapus, Tom Rodriguez, Aljur Abrenica, and Mikael Daez. the film was produced by Regal Entertainment and GMA Films.

The film is a direct remake of the 1980 film of the same name directed by Joey Gosiengfiao. Using the same plot, dialogue, and character names with the exception of the five girls. The names of the girls are based on Gosengfiao’s other works; Virginia P, Nympha, Diary of Cristina Gaston, Secrets of Pura, and Nights of Serafina. A side-by-side comparison is shown in the credits.

== Plot ==
When the Miss Manila Sunshine Supermodel search started, it attracted the attention of the socialite Serafina L. (Lovi Poe) with her assistant, Nympha (Rufa Mae Quinto); a try-hard elite, Pura K. (Solenn Heussaff) who was planning her birthday; Virginia P. (Heart Evangelista), a wealthy college student who wanted independency; and Cristina G (Marian Rivera) who plans to seduce one of the judges in order to win. The four finalists were chosen: the Miss body beautiful title went to Virginia, Miss Photogenic for Pura, Serafina received the Miss Friendship title, and Miss Talent went to Cristina. The four must stay on an island for one month for the final judging.

On their way with a yacht, Pageant Director, Joshua (John Lapuz) proposed to his photographer boyfriend Ricardo (Mikael Daez) but he rejected for now. Alfred, (Aljur Abrenica) Virginia’s admirer who snuck in the yacht, was caught by a waiter named Umberto (Tom Rodriguez). Serafina brought her assistant, Nympha, who she verbally abuses often. Meanwhile, Cristina was with her boyfriend, Antonio (Dennis Trillo) who was self-described as a crook. Serafina and Pura show distaste with each other. A fire started when Umberto had left his lit cigarette to chase Alfred. The fire caused an explosion and, eventually, sank the yacht.

While the remaining passengers were alive and well, the four finalists, along with Nympha, Umberto, Joshua, Ricardo, and Alfred, found themselves in a desert island with no sort of locals or community in sight. The group tried catching fishes with panty hoses, but only caught small scale fishes, which were not enough for the group. Virginia and Alfred started getting closer with each other, Umberto showed interest with Cristina and Ricardo got closer with Pura, much to Joshua’s infuriation. Serafina started questioning since no guy showed interest in her. Throughout the days, small huts were made using the parts of the finalists' gowns. The five girls then started hallucinating; seeing human-size chickens, ice cream, and even started eating sand in a montage. One night, when Virginia turned down Alfred, Serafina seduced him and had sex, while Cristina shared intimacy with Umberto and Pura was with Ricardo. Joshua, who had witnessed the night, went missing.

The next day, Serafina revealed she slept with Alfred, which started a fight with the rest of the girls, and she is defeated by Cristina. Cristina, in frustration ran out and was chased by Umberto. They stumbled upon Joshua’s dead body. They found out that he committed suicide. As the group mourned over Joshua and proposes burying the body, Pura suggested eating one of Joshua’s body part to fulfill their hunger. The group are disgusted, but had no choice. Nympha finally stood up for herself when Serafina insults her and her whole family, but made up when Serafina promised payment when they get home. Umberto served Joshua’s cooked body part. The group, while crying as they eat the food, sang “Habang May Buhay,” a song famously played in funerals. At the end of the song, they noticed a group of helicopters and chased them, but they failed to spot them. Out of frustration, each of the finalists promised to change once they leave the island. They also made up with each other. A group of soldiers arrived to rescue them. Once they were back in Manila, the pageant went on and Serafina wins the Miss Sunshine Manila. She thanked her family, her newly found friends, Nympha and Joshua. After the competition, Pura and Ricardo revealed their plans for marriage, Serafina decided to bring Nympha in California, Virginia made up with Alfred, and Cristina chooses Umberto over Antonio.

== Cast ==
- Marian Rivera as Cristina G.
- Rufa Mae Quinto as Nympha
- Heart Evangelista as Virginia P.
- Lovi Poe as Serafina L.
- Solenn Heussaff as Pura K.
- Dennis Trillo as Antonio
- Aljur Abrenica as Alfred
- Tom Rodriguez as Umberto
- Mikael Daez as Ricardo
- John Lapus as Joshua
- Deborah Sun as Nenuca Kikinang
- Azenith Briones as Mrs. Syjuco
- Tim Yap as himself (male host)
- Tessa Prieto-Valdes as herself (female host)
- Maggie Wilson as herself (Manila Sunshine Girl 2010)
- Carlito Campos Jr. as TV reporter
- Kalila Aguilos as afro girl
- Jerome Madera as manyakis
- Mang Enriquez as host

== Production ==
In 2010, Regal Entertainment decided to remake their 1980s cult film Temptation Island that starred Dina Bonnevie, Deborah Sun, Jennifer Cortez, Bambi Arambulo, and Azenith Briones. Initially, ABS-CBN had the TV rights from Regal Films to remake the film into a TV series together with another 1980s film, Underage. But Regal Films asked to take back the rights and the two companies compromised that ABS-CBN artists would be part of the remake. The initial cast were supposedly Marian Rivera, Angelica Panganiban, Lovi Poe, Pokwang, Carla Abellana, Shaina Magdayao, and Andi Eigenmann. But, Regal Entertainment decided to co-produce the film with GMA Films, which is ABS-CBN's rival network's film studio Star Cinema, and they then pulled out ABS-CBN artists of the film. In March 2011, the final cast was revealed and that the film will star Marian Rivera, Heart Evangelista, Solenn Heussaff, and Lovi Poe. The leading men completed the cast with Aljur Abrenica, Tom Rodriguez, and Mikael Daez. Paulo Avelino was initially one of the leading men, but later refused because of health reasons. He was replaced by Mikael Daez.

In April 2011, production started in Paoay, Ilocos Norte.

== Reception ==
According to Box Office Mojo, the film was able to garner more than ₱60M in four weeks of showing, despite being pitted against Hollywood blockbusters Transformers: Dark of the Moon and Harry Potter and the Deathly Hallows – Part 2.

== See also ==
- Temptation Island (1980 film)
