= My Valentine Girls =

- Directed by: Chris Martinez (segment "Gunaw"); Andoy Ranay (segment "BFF"); Dominic Zapata (segment "Soulmates")
- Screenplay by: Aloy Adlawan (segments "Soulmates" and "BBF"); Rona Lean Sales (segments "Soulmates" and "BBF")
- Story by: Chris Martinez (segment "Gunaw"); Marlon Rivera (segment "Gunaw")
- Produced by: Jose Mari Abacan; Roselle Monteverde; Annette Gozon-Abrogar; Lily Y. Monteverde
- Starring: Richard Gutierrez; Eugene Domingo; Rhian Ramos; Lovi Poe; Solenn Heussaff; Jillian Ward
- Cinematography: Mackie Galvez (segments "Soulmates" and "BBF"); Mo Zee (segment "Gunaw")
- Edited by: Sheryll Lopez (segments "Soulmates" and "BBF"); Vanessa Ubas de Leon (segment "Gunaw")
- Music by: Teresa Barrozo (segment "Soulmates"); Von de Guzman (segment "Gunaw"); Frederic John Ferraz (segment "BFF")
- Production companies: Regal Films; GMA Pictures
- Distributed by: GMA Pictures; Regal Entertainment
- Release date: February 9, 2011
- Running time: 147 minutes
- Country: Philippines
- Languages: Filipino; English
- Box office: ₱43,598,560.00 (US$1,013,920.00)

My Valentine Girls is a romantic comedy film directed by Dominic Zapata, Andoy Ranay and Chris Martinez, starring Richard Gutierrez, Rhian Ramos, Solenn Heussaff, Lovi Poe and Eugene Domingo. The film was released in 2011. The film was produced by GMA Pictures.

== Plot ==
Arvin Perez is a novelist who wants to write the perfect love story. The movie tells a trilogy of stories.

The movie started with Richard being bothered and insulted by his Arvin's little sister as he writes his novel. After this, the little girl decided to read the second part of the story as Richard takes a break. Richard returns and is thinking of making a horrific story to end his novel. He originally wanted to make a story with a vampire and werewolf but decided that it just sounds like Twilight so he decided to make an apocalyptic story. At the end, Richard has finally released his book and on his book celebration party. With the re-appearance of all the leading ladies of the three stories there is an announcement of the world coming to an end because of North Korea launching its nuclear missiles.

=== Soulmates ===
Oslec is a taxi driver who cares for his mom and his sister. Aia on the other hand is rich clothing designer. One night while on shift Oslec gets a flat tire and while trying to fix, he is hit by a car driven by Aia. Aia awakens and is yelled at by Oslec on her way home saying that he can't get home ever since he was hit by Aia. Oslec follows Aia to her house and discovers he is dead and is now a ghost. Aia helps Oslec get home and is guilty that she killed Oslec. Oslec goes back to Aia's house saying he got lonely and had no one to talk to. The two eventually become friends and learn more about each other they fall in love with one another. Oslec goes home and over hears that he is not dead. Aia and Oslec visit Osclec's body in the hospital and promise each other once Oslec wakes up they will do everything they did together when Oslec was a ghost. Oslec wakes up but Aia discovers that she is also a ghost when Oslec's mother and sister walk right through her. Oslec is now alive and well but is sad when his mom tells him that she heard that Aia died the other day, so Oslec decides to visit Aia's house and is informed by her father that she is not dead. Oslec goes to the hospital and tells Aia to wake up and that they'll do everything they did in their dreams and leaves her a note. A couple weeks later Oslec is at Enchanted Kingdom with his family when he sees Aia well again. And the two reunite and admit that they love each other.

=== BBF ===
The story starts on Valentine's Day. Where everyone is so busy with all the usual rituals couples do. On the other hand. Zach is an attorney at the Public Attorney's Office who always takes his best friend Andie on a date during Valentine's Day for the last 3 years. This has become a usual thing for them during this day. Zach is becoming worried about the real status of the relationship that he and Andie holds. On Valentine's Day while on their date with Andie, Andie introduced Zach to her girl best friend Ruby. Ruby on the other hand, is a brokenhearted girl. She was about to marry her fiancé but the guy left him on the same day. Being bored at the bar where she meets Zach, Zach and Ruby decide to go out and they got the chance to talk and learn more about their lives. They decide to come by the house of Ruby's ex-fiancé. She got excited with the rock and she throw it at his car. The alarm of the car was turned on immediately. They were in panic that Ruby's shoe was almost lost and so is Zach's sentimental wrist watch. They swore that they will never ever forget each other and maybe they'll see each other again if Ruby dreams of Zach that night. The next day, Andie and Zach spent the whole day together. Clearly states that Zach really loves Andie. Ruby was at Zach's court case to see him. Zach told Ruby that he will be giving up his job at the Public Attorney's Office and will be working at an aw firm after the current case he's handing. The two went on several dates and eventually fall in love and became lovers. Andie was so happy to hear the news that her best friends worked out together but she was kind of upset that Zach doesn't do the usual things they do before he had a girlfriend. Zach comforted her and she eventually got over it. They became close again but Ruby was so insecure about their friendship. One day, Ruby got Zach a wrist watch for his birthday and he was confused on what to do with his two wrist watches. On his surprise birthday party, Ruby heard Zach's grandfather talking to Andie about the sentimental watch she gave him on his last birthday. Ruby approached Zach and she saw that he was not wearing the watch that she gave him. She was so upset and walked out the birthday party. She was followed by Zach. They talked about Zach's real feelings for Andie and he doesn't love her. During a traffic fight, Ruby was caught in the middle and got shot. Zach was sorry because Ruby got hurt and Andie also admitted to Ruby that she was scared that's why she can't show her love to Zach. Valentine's Day was upon them once more. Ruby has already moved on and is dating her ex-fiancé. Zach finally admitted his real feelings for Andie and Andie told Zach that "I could tell you over and over how much I love you but I'd rather show it". They share a passionate kiss.

=== Gunaw ===
The last story of the film. It started up on a Valentine's Day in Korea where a guard monkeys around with his lover and accidentally pressing the button launching their nuclear missiles towards other countries which resulted a counterattack from all over the world and started a Nuclear War that destroyed humanity itself. The after effect caused death all over the world and started a Zombie Apocalypse to those who did not fully died. The story continued three years later with the main Character Aidan by himself surviving by himself and looking for other survivor. Later on crossed path with Ivy who foolishly devoted herself to Aidan declaring that they have the responsibility to repopulate the world. Ivy tagged along with Aidan to prove him that she was right and they are the key of restarting the human race. After a long journey and annoying seductive attempts of Ivy to Aidan. They met up with a group of male survivors that automatically worshiped Ivy as their Goddess. Aiden thought they were crazy and decided to leave the group and right as he was leaving, no matter how much Ivy loved being worship she went with Aiden because of their growing love for each other. A few years passed and the short movie ended with Aiden and Ivy and their female child in the car.

== Episodes ==
=== Soulmates ===
- Richard Gutierrez as Oslec
- Rhian Ramos as Aia
- Jillian Ward as Ishi
- Princess Punzalan as Cion
- Cacai Bautista as Maan
- Lloyd Samartino
- Lui Manansala
- Shey Bustamante

=== BBF ===
- Richard Gutierrez as Zach
- Solenn Heussaff as Andie
- Lovi Poe as Ruby
- Jillian Ward as Lilly
- Rocco Nacino as Marvin
- Akihiro Sato as Tommy
- Chinggoy Alonzo as Grandpa Teryo
- Tess Antonio as Myrna

=== Gunaw ===
- Richard Gutierrez as Aidan
- Eugene Domingo as Ivy
- Michelle Madrigal as Female North Korean Soldier
- John Lapus as Male North Korean Soldier
- Maureen Larrazabal
- Jon Hall
- Melinda Bona as Maria Flores

== Cast ==
=== Main Cast ===
- Richard Gutierrez as Arvin Perez /Oslec/Zach/Aidan
- Jillian Ward as Ishi/Lily/Aidan and Ivy's daughter

=== Supporting Cast ===
- Rhian Ramos as Aia
- Solenn Heussaff as Andi
- Lovi Poe as Ruby
- Eugene Domingo as Ivy
- Princess Punzalan as Cion
- Cacai Bautista as Maan
- Lloyd Samartino
- Lui Manansala
- Shey Bustamante
- Rocco Nacino as Marvin
- Akihiro Sato as Tommy
- Chinggoy Alonzo as Grandpa Teryo
- Tess Antonio as Myrna
- Michelle Madrigal
- John Lapus
- Maureen Larrazabal
- Jon Hall
