= My Neighbor's Wife =

- Theatrical movie poster
- Directed by: Jun Lana
- Written by: Jun Lana
- Story by: Jun Lana; Denoy Navarro-Punio
- Produced by: Roselle Monteverde-Teo
- Starring: Dennis Trillo; Lovi Poe; Jake Cuenca; Carla Abellana
- Cinematography: Mo Zee
- Edited by: Tara Illenberger
- Music by: Jesse Lucas
- Production company: Regal Films
- Distributed by: Regal Films
- Release date: September 14, 2011
- Running time: 125 minutes
- Country: Philippines
- Languages: Filipino; English
- Box office: ₱27,628,300.00

My Neighbor's Wife is a 2011 Filipino drama film directed by Jun Lana, starring Dennis Trillo, Lovi Poe, Jake Cuenca, and Carla Abellana. The film premiered nationwide on September 14, 2011, under Regal Films. The movie was distributed by GMA Pictures for Philippine TV Preimere.

== Plot ==
Two couples succumb to desire and longing.

== Cast ==
- Dennis Trillo as Aaron Santillan
- Lovi Poe as Giselle Perez
- Jake Cuenca as Bullet Bernal
- Carla Abellana as Jasmine Bernal
- Dimples Romana as Tessa Vergara
- Yogo Singh as Timothy 'Tommy' Bernal

=== Cameos ===
- Katrina Halili
- Princess Manzon
- Alvin Fortuna
- Cara Eriguel
- Shey Bustamante
- April Sun
- Jovic Susim
- Aries Go
- Isaiah Ersty

== Awards and nominations ==
- 2012 28th PMPC Star Awards for Movies Movie of the Year - Nominated
- Movie Actress of the Year for (Lovi Poe) - Nominated
- 2012 FAP 30th Luna Awards Best Actress (Lovi Poe) - Nominated
- 2012 FAP 30th Luna Awards Best Supporting Actress (Carla Abellana) - Nominated
- Best Cinematography (Mo Zee) - Nominated
- Best Editing (Tara Illenberger) - Nominated
- Best Musical Scorer (Jesse Lucas) - Nominated
- Best Sound Lamberto Casas Jr.) - Nominated
