= Paul Soriano =

Filipino filmmaker, film director, and producer

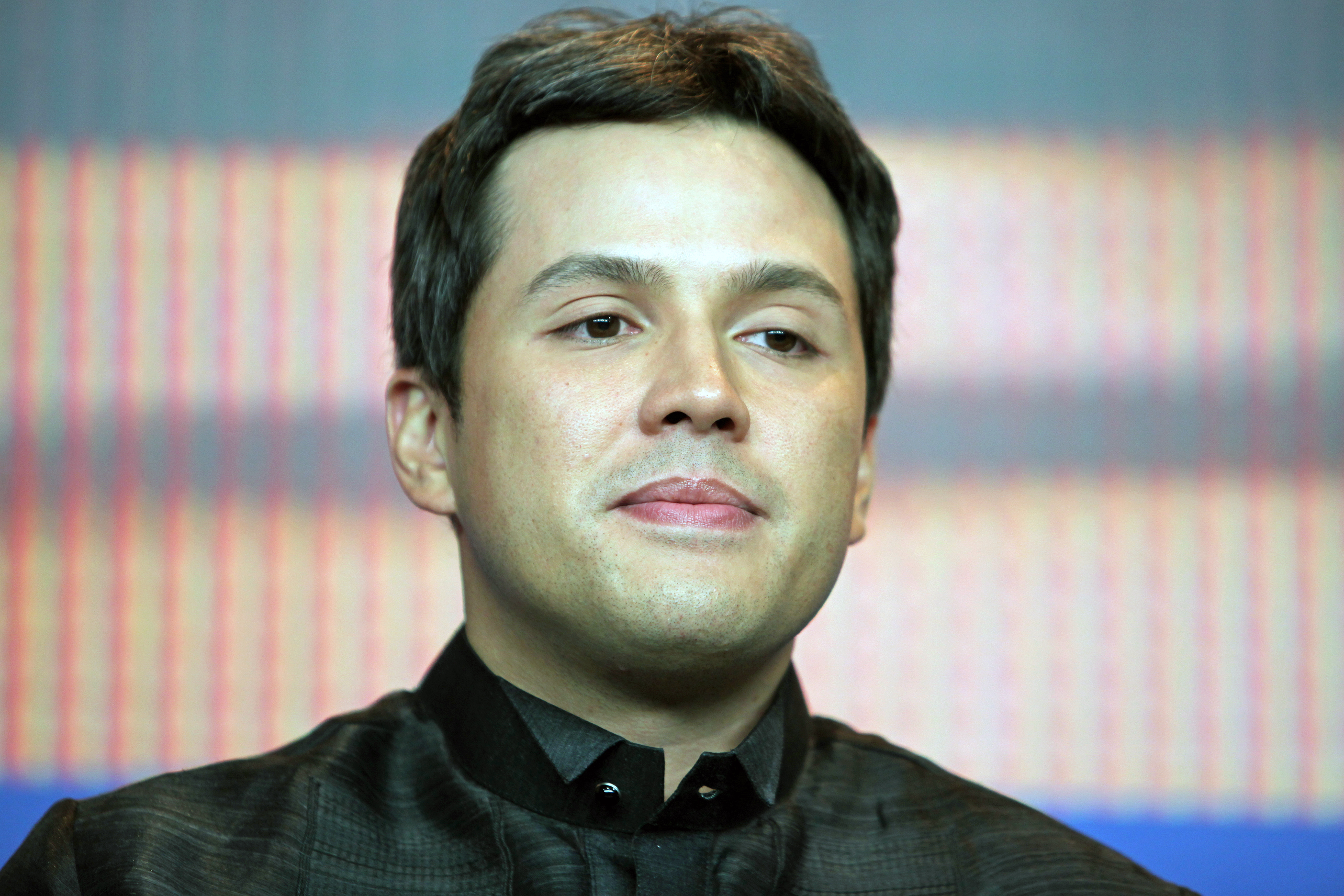
- Soriano in 2016

Presidential Adviser for Creative Communications
- In office October 17, 2022 – November 9, 2023
- President: Bongbong Marcos

Personal details
- Born: Paul David Soriano; October 17, 1981 (age 45) Los Angeles, California, U.S.
- Citizenship: United States; Philippines
- Spouse: Toni Gonzaga (m. 2015)
- Children: 2
- Relatives: Nestor de Villa (grandfather); Alex Gonzaga (sister-in-law)
- Education: Santa Clara University (BA)
- Occupation: Director; producer

Paul David Soriano (Tagalog pronunciation: [soɾˈjano]; born October 17, 1981) is a Filipino film director, writer, and producer. He previously served as Presidential Adviser on Creative Communications to the President of the Philippines, serving under President Bongbong Marcos from October 17, 2022, to November 9, 2023.

== Personal life ==
Soriano was born and raised in Los Angeles, California. His father is director and pastor Jeric Soriano, the son of actor Nestor de Villa and Maria Lourdes Cacho. At the age of eight, Soriano moved to Manila and attended high school at International School Manila, before moving back to the United States to attend De Anza College in Cupertino, California and Santa Clara University, where he studied filmmaking. He then returned to Manila after college.

Soriano married his long-time girlfriend Toni Gonzaga on June 12, 2015, in Gonzaga's hometown, Taytay, Rizal. Gonzaga gave birth to their first child, Severiano Elliott, on September 30, 2016.

== Career ==
Soriano directed A Journey Home (2009), Thelma (2011), Kid Kulafu (2015), and Dukot (2016).

In 2012, Soriano won Best Director and Best Screenplay at the FAP Awards for Thelma. That same year, Thelma won Digital Movie of the Year, as well as Digital Movie Director of the Year and Digital Movie Original Screenplay of the Year with Froilan Medina, at the 28th PMPC Star Awards for Movies.

In 2022, Soriano was named Presidential Advisor on Creative Communications to President Bongbong Marcos.

== Filmography ==
Year	Release date	Film	Director(s)	Credit	Notes
2009	October 3	A Journey Home	Paul Soriano		
2011	September 7	Thelma	Paul Soriano		
2013	July 27; September 11	Transit	Hannah Espia		Best Film at the 2013 Cinemalaya Film Festival
2014	August 2	Dagitab	Giancarlo Abrahan V		
2014	August 2	Mariquina	Milo Sogueco		
2015	April 15	Kid Kulafu	Paul Soriano		
2016	March 26	Hele sa Hiwagang Hapis	Lav Diaz		Alfred Bauer Prize at the 66th Berlin International Film Festival
2016	July 13	Dukot	Paul Soriano	Director, producer	
2017	December 25	Siargao	Paul Soriano	Director, producer	Best Director at the 2017 Metro Manila Film Festival
2018	October 17	First Love	Paul Soriano	Director, producer	
2018	December 25	Mary, Marry Me	RC delos Reyes	Producer	
2019	December 4	Mañanita	Paul Soriano	Director, producer	
2019	December 25	Sunod	Carlo Ledesma	Producer	Premiered at the 2019 Metro Manila Film Festival
2020	November 15	Alter Me	RC delos Reyes	Producer	
2022	December 25	My Teacher	Paul Soriano	Director, producer	Premiered at the 2022 Metro Manila Film Festival
2024	August 28	Real Life Fiction	Paul Soriano	Director, writer, producer	
2025	September 10	Magellan	Lav Diaz	Producer	Distributor only with Black Cap Pictures
2026	May 19	Diamond	Andy Garcia	Producer	

Political offices
New office	Presidential Adviser for Creative Communications; 2022–2023	Vacant
