= Thelma (2011 film) =

- Theatrical movie poster
- Directed by: Paul Soriano
- Screenplay by: Froilan Medina; Paul Soriano
- Story by: Rino Que; Froilan Medina; Paul Soriano
- Produced by: Samantha Chavez Que; Rino Que; Maja Salvador; Paul Soriano
- Starring: Maja Salvador; Jason Abalos; Tetchie Agbayani
- Cinematography: Odyssey Flores
- Edited by: Mark Victor
- Music by: Archie Castillo
- Production companies: TimeHorizon Pictures; Abracadabra; Underground Logic; Ten17P
- Distributed by: Star Cinema; Paramount Pictures (International)
- Release date: September 7, 2011
- Running time: 111 minutes
- Country: Philippines
- Languages: Filipino; Tagalog; Ilocano
- Box office: ₱1.6 million

Thelma is 2011 Philippine drama film released by Star Cinema with Maja Salvador portraying the title-role. The film is directed by Paul Soriano and is inspired by true stories. The film premiered on September 7, 2011 and received an "A" rating from the Cinema Evaluation Board.

== Plot ==
Thelma is a delinquent, tomboyish high school student from an impoverished family in Ilocos Norte who uses her running abilities to get away with her occasional thefts. One day, her younger sister Hannah is left unable to walk after being hit by a car on her way to school, forcing Thelma to quit school and help out in the household and in their farm. Struck with guilt after she left Hannah unattended at the time of the accident, Thelma joins and wins a local marathon, using the prize money to buy a wheelchair for Hannah.

Danny, Thelma's high school coach, notices her skills in the marathon and convinces her parents to let her return to school and join the varsity team. Thelma is initially reluctant to run as she is shy about running in public and dislikes training, but her mother Floring, who reveals herself to be a former track and field athlete, convinces her to join in the hopes that she could get a better future and also helps her train. Thelma continues her studies and receives formal training as an athlete, improving her grades while winning the Palarong Pambansa held in Laoag. Dubbed the "Northern Wind" by the press, Thelma wins an athletic scholarship to Manila and moves to a dormitory there. She develops a rivalry with Lexi, an arrogant co-athlete and national record-holder, while striking a relationship with Sammy, who is seeking a job as a seaman to get out of poverty.

While remitting her scholarship allowance home, she is told by her aunt Marie over the phone that Floring was hospitalized after collapsing at home and is diagnosed with cancer. Despondent, she fails her academics and is temporarily suspended from the varsity team and trying out for the national team. As she ponders on whether she should go home, her parents call her, telling her that they love her and to continue with her athletic journey. Thelma continues running and eventually defeats Lexi in a marathon, while speaking in the first person about her lessons in life.

== Cast ==
- Maja Salvador as Thelma
- John Arcilla as Aldo
- Tetchie Agbayani as Floring
- Perry Escaño as Carding
- Eliza Pineda as Hannah
- Sue Prado as Marie
- Jason Abalos as Sammy
- Elma Muros as Coach Rose

== Production ==
Maja Salvador underwent training by a national track star and Survivor Philippines castaway Elma Muros and her husband Jojo Posadas for her role as a runner in the independent film. Paul Soriano was chosen to direct the film. Filming began whilst simultaneously taping for Salvador's show Minsan Lang Kita Iibigin.
