= Julie Anne San Jose discography =

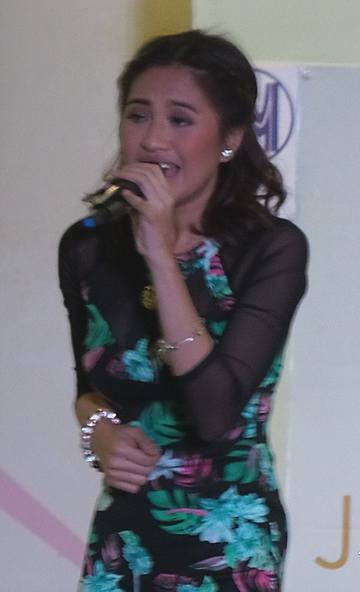
- San Jose performing in 2015
- Studio albums: 3
- EPs: 2
- Soundtrack albums: 78
- Compilation albums: 4
- Singles: 33
- Music videos: 35

The discography for Filipino singer and actress Julie Anne San Jose contains 3 studio albums, 4 compilation albums, 2 EPs, and 33 singles, with 20 credited as a songwriter. She is the third and youngest OPM artist to reach Diamond Record Status for her self-titled debut album, Julie Anne San Jose, which sold more than 150,000 units in the Philippines. This album is also included in the list of the best-selling albums in the Philippines overall. San Jose is the first-ever recipient of the Philippine Association of the Record Industry's (PARI) Platinum Digital Single Award for the outstanding digital sales performance of her carrier single "I'll Be There", which has over 245,000 downloads. San Jose’s sophomore studio album, DEEPER, received a Triple Platinum Award and was recognized by the Awit Awards as the Best-Selling Album of 2014.

== Albums ==
=== Studio albums ===
Title	Album details	Charts PH:	Sales	Certifications
Julie Anne San Jose	Released: August 2012; Label: GMA Music; Formats: CD, digital download	1	PHI: 150,000 (Note: Sales are based on certifications alone)	PARI: Diamond
Deeper	Released: June 1, 2014; Label: GMA Music; Formats: CD, digital download	1	PHI: 45,000	PARI: 3× Platinum
Chasing the Light	Released: July 10, 2016; Label: GMA Music; Formats: CD, digital download	1	PHI: 6,000	

=== Compilation albums ===
Title	Year	Label
Tween Academy: Class of 2012 (soundtrack)	2011	GMA Music
GMA Records' #1 Hits	2013	GMA Music
BEAUTY & THE MUSIC Vol. 1	2013	GMA Music
PERS LAB: GMA Collection Series	2013	GMA Music
My Guitar Princess OST	2018	Universal Records

== Extended plays ==
Title	Album details	Certifications / sales
Forever	Released: November 8, 2015; Label: Vim Entertainment; Formats: CD, digital download	PARI: Gold; PHI: 7,500
Breakthrough	Released: July 27, 2018; Label: Universal Records; Formats: CD, digital download	

== Singles ==
Title	Year	Charts PH:	Certifications / sales	Album
"I'll Be There"	2012	1	PARI: 4× Platinum; PHI: 600,000 (digital)	Julie Anne San Jose
"Baby U Are"	2012			Julie Anne San Jose
"Enough"	2012			Julie Anne San Jose
"Let Me Be the One"	2012			Julie Anne San Jose
"Bakit Ngayon"	2012			Julie Anne San Jose
"For Everything"	2012			Julie Anne San Jose
"Deeper"	2014			Deeper
"Right Where You Belong"	2014			Deeper
"Blinded"	2014			Deeper
"Tulad Mo"	2014			Deeper
"Kung Maibabalik Ko Lang"	2014			Deeper
"Dedma" (with Abra)	2014			Deeper
"Tidal Wave"	2015			Forever
"Not Impressed"	2015			Forever
"Forever"	2015			Forever
"Naririnig Mo Ba?"	2016	1		Chasing the Light
"Chasing the Light"	2016			Chasing the Light
"Nothing Left"	2018	1		Breakthrough
"Your Song"	2018			Breakthrough
"Tayong Dalawa"	2018			Breakthrough
"Down for Me" featuring Fern	2018			Breakthrough
"Regrets"	2019	1		
"Isang Gabi" (featuring Rico Blanco)	2019	1		
"Nobela"	2019			
"Better"	2020			
"Bahaghari" (featuring Gloc-9)	2020	1		
"Try Love Again"	2020			
"Free"	2021			
"Kung Wala Ka"	2021	3		
"Everybody Hurts" with Christian Bautista	2022			
"Di Ka Akin" with Gary Valenciano	2022			
"Pag-Ibig Na Kaya" (with Rayver Cruz)	2023			
"Something"	2023			
"Nothing's Gonna Change My Love For You" (with Erik Santos)	2024			
"Sikat Ang Pinoy" (with Darren Espanto)	2025			
"Simula"	2025			
"Kung Ikaw Ay Bibitaw"	2026			

=== Other appearances ===
Title	Year	Duet/s	Album
"Cruisin"	2014	Christian Bautista	Soundtrack
Pitik Bulag	2018		Awit at Laro
Maleta	2019	Gloc-9	Tulay
"The Perfect Christmas"	2019	Moira, Ben&Ben, I Belong to the Zoo, December Ave	Tatak Pinoy All Stars

== Songwriting credits ==
Song	Year	Album	Music and arrangement
"Baby U Are"	2012	Julie Anne San Jose	
"When You Said Goodbye"	2012	Julie Anne San Jose	
"Deeper"	2014	Deeper	
"Never Had You"	2014	Deeper	
"Tulad Mo"	2014	Deeper	
"Blinded"	2014	Deeper	
"If Love's a Crime"	2014	Deeper	
"Dedma"	2014	Deeper	Lyrics with Abra
"Naririnig Mo Ba?"	2016	Chasing the Light	
"Not a Game"	2016	Chasing the Light	
"Tayong Dalawa"	2018	Breakthrough	Marcus Davis
"Ways"	2018	Breakthrough	
"Regrets"	2019		
"Isang Gabi"	2019		Lyrics with Rico Blanco
"Better"	2020		
"Bahaghari"	2020		Lyrics with Gloc-9 and Pino G
"Free"	2021		Lyrics with Andrew Gonzales, Eduardo Gonzales, Denise Pimping and Herdy Casseus
"Di Ka Akin"	2022		
"Something"	2023		
"Simula"	2025		Lyrics and Arrangement; Produced with Line In Prod

== Music videos ==
Title	Year	Director
I'll Be There	2012	Mark A. Reyes
Enough	2012	Mark A. Reyes
Ang Aking Puso (with Derrick Monasterio)	2012	Omar Derocca
For Everything	2013	Rico Gutierrez
I'll Be There (with Kristofer Martin)	2013	Omar Derocca
Right Where You Belong	2014	Louie Ignacio
Tulad Mo	2014	Raymund Isaac
Dedma	2014	Joy Aquino
Kung Maibabalik Ko Lang	2015	Milos Curameng
Cruisin'	2015	Mark A. Reyes
Tidal Wave	2015	Laura Ferro
Not Impressed (feat. Nitty Scott)	2015	Laura Ferro
Forever	2015	Zolita
Tidal Wave Remix	2015	Jason Magbanua
Naririnig Mo Ba	2016	Chris Librojo
Chasing the Light	2016	Carby Salvador
Magic ng Pasko	2016	
Nothing Left	2018	Grace De Luna
Nothing Left Ver 2.	2018	Janine Sevalla and Julie Anne San Jose
Tayong Dalawa	2018	JC Echanes
Down for Me (feat. Fern)	2018	Richard Webb
Maleta (feat. Gloc-9)	2019	JC Echanes
Regrets	2019	GB Mao
Isang Gabi (feat. Rico Blanco)	2020	Myke Francisco
Nobela	2020	Cholo Sediaren
Better	2020	
Bahaghari (feat. Gloc-9)	2020	
Try Love Again	2020	
Rocket To The Moon	2020	
Free	2021	Miggy Tanchangco
Kung Wala Ka	2021	
Everybody Hurts	2022	Treb Monteras
Di Ka Akin	2022	
Pag-Ibig Na Kaya (with Rayver Cruz)	2023	Niq Ablao
Jollibee Share The Joy	2023	
Something	2023	

== Soundtracks ==
Song	Year	Title	Network
"Aking Mundo"	2008	Dyesebel	GMA Network
"Siya Nga Kaya"	2008	Dyesebel	GMA Network
"Awit Ng Puso"	2008	GMA Network Christmas station ID	GMA Network
"Pag-ibig Na Tunay"	2010	Pilyang Kerubin	GMA Network
"Dahil Sayo Natutong Magmahal"	2010	The Last Prince	GMA Network
"Sa Piling Ko"	2011	Sisid	GMA Network
"Time Of My Life (with Kris Lawrence)"	2011	Time Of My Life	GMA Network
"Tangi Kong Hiling"	2011	Dwarfina	GMA Network
"Ang Kasalo Sa Pasko"	2011	GMA News TV Christmas station ID	GMA News TV
"There's Only One Hot Party! Sama Na, Summer Na!"	2012	GMA Network Summer Station ID	GMA Network
"Bakit Ba Ganyan"	2012	Just One Summer	GMA Films
"Nothing's Gonna Stop Us Now (with Elmo Magalona)"	2012	Tween Academy: Class of 2012	GMA Films
"Kaba"	2012	Tween Academy: Class of 2012	GMA Films
"Ang Aking Puso (with Derrick Monasterio)"	2012	My Kontrabida Girl	GMA Films
"Broken Vow"	2012	Broken Vow	GMA Network
"Together Forever"	2012	Together Forever	GMA Network
"Everything's Alright"	2012	Teen Gen	GMA Network
"Kahit Man Lang Sa Pangarap"	2012	Paroa: Ang Kuwento ni Mariposa	GMA Network
"Anumang Kulay ng Buhay (with Regine Velasquez)"	2012	GMA Network official theme song	GMA Network
"I'll Be There"	2012	Lie to Me	GMA Network
"Summer Shake"	2013	Party Pilipinas Summer OBB	GMA Network
"Bakit Ngayon"	2013	The Greatest Love	GMA Network
"I'll Be There" (with Kristofer Martin)	2013	Kahit Nasaan Ka Man	GMA Network
"Pagbangon"	2013	GMA Network's theme song for the victims of Typhoon Yolanda	GMA Network
"Bida"	2014	Ysa Botanica Jingle	Ysa Skin Care Corp.
"Dedma" (with Abra)	2014	Kubot: The Aswang Chronicles 2	GMA Films
"There's More to Life"	2014	GMA Life TV station ID	GMA Life TV
"Sa Iyong Mundo" (with Rita De Guzman)	2014	Kambal Sirena	GMA Network
"Ikaw, Ako at Siya" (with Janno Gibbs and Jaya)	2014	Ang Dalawang Mrs. Real	GMA Network
"Share the Love"	2014	GMA Network Christmas station ID	GMA Network
"Right Where You Belong"	2014	Master's Sun	GMA Network
"Suma-summer Na Naman"	2015	Sunday All Stars Summer OBB	GMA Network
"If You Believe"	2015	Healing Hearts	GMA Network
"Let the Love Begin" (with Ralf King)	2015	Let the Love Begin	GMA Network
"Bagong Umaga"	2015	Strawberry Lane	GMA Network
"Nasaan ang Dating Tayo"	2015	Buena Familia	GMA Network
"You&Me"	2016	Because of You	GMA Network
"Buhos ng Pagmamahal"	2016	GMA Network rainy season station ID	GMA Network
"Magic ng Pasko"	2016	GMA Network Christmas station ID	GMA Network
"Pag-ibig Di Lumisan"	2017	Pinulot Ka Lang sa Lupa	GMA Network
"Lets Do the HAHA Shake! Shake!"	2017	Sunday PinaSaya	GMA Network
"Walang Iwanan" (with Christian Bautista)	2017	Follow Your Heart	GMA News and Public Affairs
"Buong Puso Magmahalan"	2017	GMA Network Christmas Station ID	GMA Network
"Kung Ika'y Maniwala"	2018	Sirkus	GMA Network
"Puso ng Saya"	2018	Sunday PinaSaya	GMA Network
"Walang Kapalit"	2018	My Guitar Princess	GMA Network
"Maghintay"	2018	My Guitar Princess	GMA Network
"Sa Dulo"	2018	My Guitar Princess	GMA Network
"Puso Ng Pasko"	2018	GMA Network Christmas Station ID	GMA Network
"Bulong"	2019	Hanggang sa Dulo ng Buhay Ko	GMA Network
"Mangarap ka, Laban pa"	2019	The Clash (season 2)	GMA Network
"Love Shines"	2019	GMA Network Christmas Station ID	GMA Network
"You are My Everything"	2020	Descendants of the Sun	GMA Network
"All Out Sundays"	2020	All-Out Sundays	GMA Network
"Rocket to the Moon"	2020	Over the Moon	Netflix
"Isang Puso Ngayong Pasko"	2020	GMA Network Christmas Station ID	GMA Network
"See You At The Cafe"	2021	Heartful Café	GMA Network
"Kung Wala Ka"	2021	Mr. Queen	GMA Network
"Still"	2021	"Still" (a Viu original musical narrative series)	Viu
"Bagong Mundo"	2021	"Still" (a Viu original musical narrative series)	Viu
"Mundo Umiikot Ka"	2021	"Still" (a Viu original musical narrative series)	Viu
"Muli"	2021	"Still" (a Viu original musical narrative series)	Viu
"Love Together, Hope Together"	2021	GMA Network Christmas Station ID	GMA Network
"Stronger Together" ft. XOXO	2022	GMA Pinoy TV Station ID	GMA Network
"It's a Brand New Day"	2022	GMA Life TV Station ID	GMA Network
"Babaguhin ang ang Buong Mundo"	2022	Maria Clara at Ibarra	GMA Network
"Love Is Us"	2022	GMA Network Christmas Station ID	GMA Network
"Pag-ibig na Kaya" (with Rayver Cruz)	2023	Pag-ibig Na Kaya? Online Mini Series	Universal Records
"Share The Joy" (with Gary Valenciano)	2023	Jollibee 45th Anniversary Jingle	Jollibee Studios
"New Heroes"	2023	NCAA Season 99	GMA Synergy/ GTV (Philippine TV network)
"Voltes V No Uta"	2023	Voltes V: Legacy	GMA Network
"Voltes V No Uta"	2023	Voltes V: Legacy – The Cinematic Experience	GMA Pictures
"Feeling Blessed Ngayong Pasko"	2023	GMA Network Christmas Station ID	GMA Network
"Hinahanap-Hanap Kita"	2023	Magnolia Dari Creme TVC	Magnolia
"Isa Sa Puso ng Pilipino"	2024	GMA Network Station ID 2024	GMA Network
"Some Of These Days"	2024	Pulang Araw	GMA Network / Netflixph
"Panata Sa Bayan	2024	Dapat Totoo GMA Eleksyon 2025	GMA Public Affairs / GMA News TV
"Ganito Ang Paskong Pinoy, Puno ng PASASALAMAT"	2024	GMA Network Christmas Station ID	GMA Network
"Gemini"	2025	SLAY	GMA Network / Viu (streaming service)
"Sikat Ang Pinoy" (with Darren Espanto)	2025	Pinoy Big Brother: Celebrity Collab Edition	GMA Network / ABS-CBN / Star Music
"Bagong Tadhana"	2025	Encantadia Chronicles: Sang'gre	GMA Network
"We Are Sparkle"	2025	Sparkle Management 30th Anniversary Jingle	GMA Network
"Golden Glow" (with Anya Lagman)	2026	Avignon Clinic Official Jingle	Avignon Clinic, ML Lagman Music
