= David Licauco =

Filipino actor and model (born 1994)

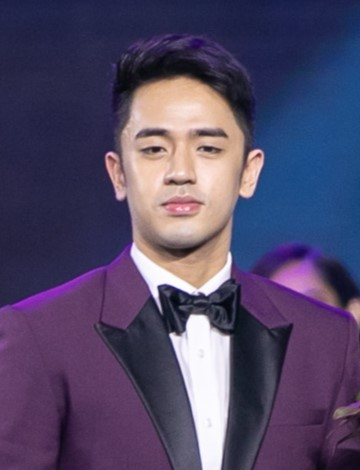
- Licauco in 2022
- Born: David Alexander Sy Licauco; June 15, 1994 (age 32); Quezon City, Philippines
- Education: Ateneo de Manila University; De La Salle–College of Saint Benilde (BSBA)
- Occupations: Actor; brand ambassador; model; entrepreneur
- Years active: 1997–present
- Agent: Sparkle (2016–present)
- Height: 5 ft 11 in (1.80 m)
- Basketball career

Career information
- College: Benilde

Career history
- 2025: Taho Story (3x3)

David Alexander Sy Licauco (Tagalog: [ˈdeɪvɪd lɪˈkaʊko]: born June 15, 1994) is a Filipino actor, model, and businessman. He is known for portraying Malik for GMA television drama Mulawin vs. Ravena (2017), Fidel de los Reyes y Maglipol in Maria Clara at Ibarra (2022–2023), Carding in Maging Sino Ka Man (2023) and Hiroshi Tanaka in Pulang Araw (2024) aired on GMA Network.

== Early life and education ==
Born to Jolan Alexander Licauco and Eden Sy Licauco with Chinese Filipino ancestry, he is the second-oldest child. His siblings are Elan Alyssandra, Jean Arianne May, and James Daniel; the latter two are both volleyball players and have previously played for the Ateneo Blue Eagles. He is a grandson of Jaime Licauco, an internationally known parapsychologist, columnist, author, lecturer, hypnotherapist, and consultant.

Licauco finished high school at Grace Christian College. He then studied college at De La Salle–College of Saint Benilde, playing for its varsity basketball team, then graduated with a Bachelor of Science degree in Business Administration Major in Computer Applications in 2016.

== Acting and modelling career ==
=== 2014–2016: Career beginnings ===
Prior to becoming a TV actor and a professional model, Licauco started modelling inside the campus for several school event posters. His modelling flair was discovered in the shores of Boracay. He then landed a modelling job via Mr. and Ms. Chinatown on ABS-CBN which opened him opportunities in modelling and acting. In the succeeding months, he walked for several fashion shows such as those of Cosmopolitan, Coca-Cola, and Bench, and graced magazine covers including Candy Magazine, Chalk Magazine, and Garage Magazine.

Although Licauco had been a constant face in fashion shows and magazine covers, in 2014 he made his acting debut in the movie The Amazing Praybeyt Benjamin topbilled by Vice Ganda. In the succeeding year he made a cameo in the television series FlordeLiza aired on ABS-CBN followed by playing small roles in Ipaglaban Mo!, Magpakailanman and Karelasyon in 2016.

Licauco did not initially intend to pursue a career in entertainment. In a March 2023 interview for GMA Network's Kapuso Profiles, he stated that he did not consider himself "good-looking" enough for the industry during his youth, while describing himself as having been an "ordinary basketball player" who did not envision becoming an actor.

=== 2017–2021: Rising popularity ===
In 2017, Licauco starred in the television fantaserye Mulawin vs Ravena. After landing the role of Malik, Licauco's popularity skyrocketed, launching him into stardom. Because of this, he landed consecutive roles in the television series Kapag Nahati ang Puso and TODA One I Love.

In 2021, Licauco received his first leading role in GMA Network's romantic comedy series Heartful Café. It premiered on April 26, 2021, on the network's Telebabad line up.

=== 2022–present: Breakthrough ===
In 2022, Licauco received his breakthrough role in Maria Clara at Ibarra where he starred as Fidel de los Reyes, the mischievous friend of the character Crisostomo Ibarra (played by Dennis Trillo) and potential love interest of Klay Infantes (Barbie Forteza). His performance was tagged by various media outlets as the "New Philippine Superstar not for his boy-next-door looks, but on-point acting skills." Licauco also sang the official theme song for the FiLay love team in the show entitled "Kailangan Kita", which was released on December 23, 2022. The theme song is under GMA Music and GMA Playlist.

On November 22, 2022, Licauco renewed his contract with Sparkle GMA Artist Center.

Licauco was a cover star of March, 2023 issues of Cosmopolitan Philippines, Mega Man Magazine and Scout magazine. He became a cover model of Summit Media's Preview Magazine October, 2023, as “new-generation matinee idol,” and L'Officiel Hommes Philippines Fall-Winter issue, November, 2023, "Balancing Act".

== Other ventures ==
=== Male pageantry ===
Prior to modeling and acting, Licauco joined a male pageant and won Mr. Chinatown 1st runner up in 2014. This opened doors for him to join the modeling and showbiz industries.

=== Business ===
In 2019, Licauco, as entrepreneur, opened his first restaurant, Turks Shawarma in Valenzuela, Metro Manila. He is the president and CEO of DJA Fitlife Corporation, Kuya Korea Corporation, MAD Business Group, and As Nature Intended. He expanded his food and on-line businesses with His Sobra Comfort Filipino Food delivery rising to Sóbra Café in Ayala Alabang. He founded Kuya Korea and 25th Burgers chains.

Aside from restaurants, he also owns a fit-out construction company.

=== Sports career ===
Licauco has played basketball. Both the typical 5x5 format and the 3x3 variant. He was a varsity player for De La Salle–College of Saint Benilde in the National Collegiate Athletic Association in the 2010s. Along with Louie Vigil, Gryann Mendoza and Tosh Sesay, Licauco formed the Taho Story A Team which played in the two-day 2025 Pilipinas United 3x3 League. He was also brand ambassador for the namesake taho business of the team.

== Personal life ==
Licauco previously dated actress Sue Ramirez and model and flight attendant Beatrix Santos (2019–2023).

In June 2024, Licauco confirmed that he was taken but did not disclose the name of his non-showbiz girlfriend in Fast Talk with Boy Abunda. He confirmed that he was single and had broken-up with his mystery girlfriend on January 1, 2025.

=== Health ===
In 2023, During the Maging Sino Ka Man series Licauco revealed that he was sufferings from severe sleep apnea for a decade which stops his breathing for 30 seconds for 24 times throughout the night. In the morning , he felt heavy due to lack of sleep, out of mood and always late for the taping. In 2024, Licauco underwent a successful a minimally invasive radio frequency ablation to treat his sleep apnea.

== Filmography ==
=== Film ===
| Year | Title | Role | Notes | Ref. |
|---|---|---|---|---|
| 2014 | The Amazing Praybeyt Benjamin | David | Guest role | |
| 2019 | Because I Love You | Rael Tansinco | Lead role | |
| 2023 | Without You | Axel | Lead role | |
| 2024 | G! LU | Patrick | Lead role | |
| 2024 | That Kind of Love | Adam "Mr. Perfect" de Dios | Lead role | |
| 2025 | Samahan ng mga Makasalanan | Rev. Sam | Lead role | |

=== Television series ===
| Year | Title | Role | Notes | Ref. |
|---|---|---|---|---|
| 2015 | Flordeliza | Simon | Guest role | |
| 2016 | Ipaglaban Mo! | John's friend | Guest role | |
| 2016 | Magpakailanman: Ang Sundalong Magiting | Sgt. Canega | Guest role | |
| 2016 | Karelasyon | Teammate | Guest role | |
| 2017 | Sa Piling ni Nanay | SPO2 Alexander Jesuitas | Guest role | |
| 2017 | Karelasyon | | Guest role | |
| 2017 | Pinulot Ka Lang sa Lupa | Aiden | Guest role | |
| 2017 | Mulawin vs. Ravena | Malik | Supporting role | |
| 2018 | Kapag Nahati ang Puso | Zach Yee | Supporting role | |
| 2018 | Magpakailanman: Nakawin Natin ang Bawat Sandali | Aron | Guest role | |
| 2018 | Dear Uge: Isang Takong, Isang Tanong | Andrew Salvador | Guest role | |
| 2019 | One Hugot Away: Walang Label | Ben | Main role | |
| 2019 | TODA One I Love | Kobe Generoso | Supporting role | |
| 2019 | Wish Ko Lang!: My Dream Debut | | Guest role | |
| 2019 | Tadhana: Obsession | Manny | Guest role | |
| 2019 | Wish Ko Lang: Against All Odds | Niño | Guest role | |
| 2020 | Go! Marikina | Aldrin Kho | | |
| 2021 | Magpakailanman | Richard Yap | Guest role | |
| 2021 | Heartful Café | Ace Nobleza | Main role | |
| 2021 | Dear Uge: Shout Up | Fiel | Guest role | |
| 2022 | Mano Po Legacy: The Family Fortune | Anton Chan | Main role | |
| 2022 | Regal Studio Presents: Isn't She Lovely | Stephen | Guest role | |
| 2022 – 2023 | Maria Clara at Ibarra | Fidel Reyes y Maglipol | Supporting role (Noli Me Tangere arc) / Main role (El Filibusterismo arc) | |
| 2023 | Maging Sino Ka Man | Ricardo "Carding" Macario | Main role | |
| 2024 | Pulang Araw | Hiroshi Tanaka | Main role | |
| 2025 | Beauty Empire | Javier | Guest role | |
| 2025 | Sanggang-Dikit FR | Andrew Dizon | Guest role | |
| 2026 | Never Say Die | Andrew Dizon | Main role | |

== Discography ==
=== Soundtrack appearances ===
List of soundtrack appearances, showing year released and album name
| Title | Year | Album |
|---|---|---|
| "It's The Best Thing" | 2021 | Heartful Café OST under GMA Music |
| "Kailangan Kita" | 2022 | Maria Clara at Ibarra OST under GMA Playlist, Inc and GMA Music |

== Awards and nominations ==
Name of the award ceremony, year presented, category, nominee of the award, and the result of the nomination
| Award ceremony | Year | Category | Nominee / Work | Result | Ref. |
|---|---|---|---|---|---|
| NWSSU Students' Choice Awards | 2023 | Best Supporting Actor in a Primetime Teleserye | Maria Clara at Ibarra | Won | |
| Platinum Stallion National Media Awards | 2023 | Best Actor in a Supporting Role | Maria Clara at Ibarra | Won | |
| PMPC Star Awards for Movies | 2021 | New Movie Actor of the Year | Because I Love You | Won | |
| VP Choice Awards | 2023 | Supporting Actor of the Year | Maria Clara at Ibarra | Won | |
