= Mariquina =

Mariquina may refer to:

- Félix Berenguer de Marquina, a Spanish naval officer and government official after whom the City of Marikina is named.
- Mariquina, Chile, a commune in Chile
- Marikina, formerly Mariquina, a city in the Philippines
- Mariquina (film), a 2014 Philippine independent film directed by Milo Sogueco, set in the City of Marikina in the Philippines
