= Barbie Forteza =

Filipino actress (born 1997)

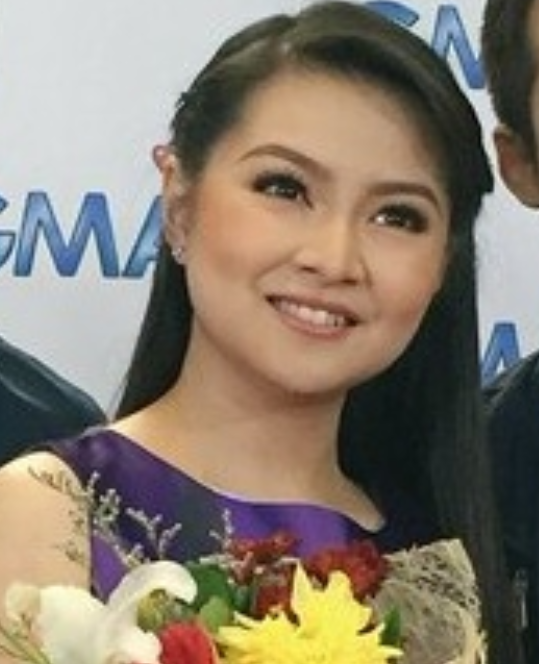
- Forteza in 2016
- Born: Barbara Ambas Forteza; July 31, 1997 (age 29); Biñan, Laguna, Philippines
- Occupations: Actress; singer; television presenter
- Years active: 2005–present
- Agent: Sparkle GMA Artist Center (2009–present)
- Height: 1.52 m (5 ft 0 in)
- Title: Kapuso Primetime Princess

YouTube information
- Channel: Barbie Forteza
- Years active: 2017–present
- Genres: Travel; make up
- Subscribers: 1.45 million
- Views: 43.5 million
- Last updated: March 28, 2026

Barbara "Barbie" Ambas Forteza (born July 31, 1997) is a Filipino actress, singer and television presenter. Regarded as the "Kapuso Primetime Princess", her accolades include a Star Awards for Movies, a Cinemalaya Film Festival Award for Best Supporting Actress, and a Fantasporto International Film Festival Award for Best Actress, with nominations from Gawad Urian, Luna Awards, Young Critics Circle, and Seoul International Drama Awards. Forteza has started in multiple acclaimed movies, such as Mariquina (2014), Laut (2016), Tuos (2017) and Almost a Love Story (2018).

She is known for playing strong female characters in drama series such as The Half Sisters (2014), Meant to Be (2017), Anak ni Waray vs. Anak ni Biday (2020). She gained wider recognition after starring in the primetime TV drama series Maria Clara at Ibarra (2022), Maging Sino Ka Man (2023) and Pulang Araw (2024).

Forteza is a recipient of several international and local accolades including Fantasporto International Film Festival Best Actress Award, Cinemalaya Independent Film Festival Best Supporting Actress Award, PMPC Star Awards for Movies New Movie Actress of the Year, three Gawad Pasado Awards, a FAMAS Award and nominations for a Seoul International Drama Award, a Gawad Urian Award, Luna Award, Young Critics Circle Award and The EDDY's Award. In 2017, she was awarded with Ani ng Dangal by National Commission for Culture and the Arts.

== Early life and education ==
Barbara Ambas Forteza was born on July 31, 1997, in Biñan, Laguna, to Imelda Ambas and Tony Forteza. She has a sister named Gabrielle Forteza-Vierneza.

She graduated from high school through Department of Education Alternative Learning System in 2015. The following year, she enrolled for college with a bachelor's degree in psychology at University of Perpetual Help System DALTA – Calamba Campus and took up some criminology classes during her freshman year.

== Career ==
=== 2007–2013: Career beginnings ===
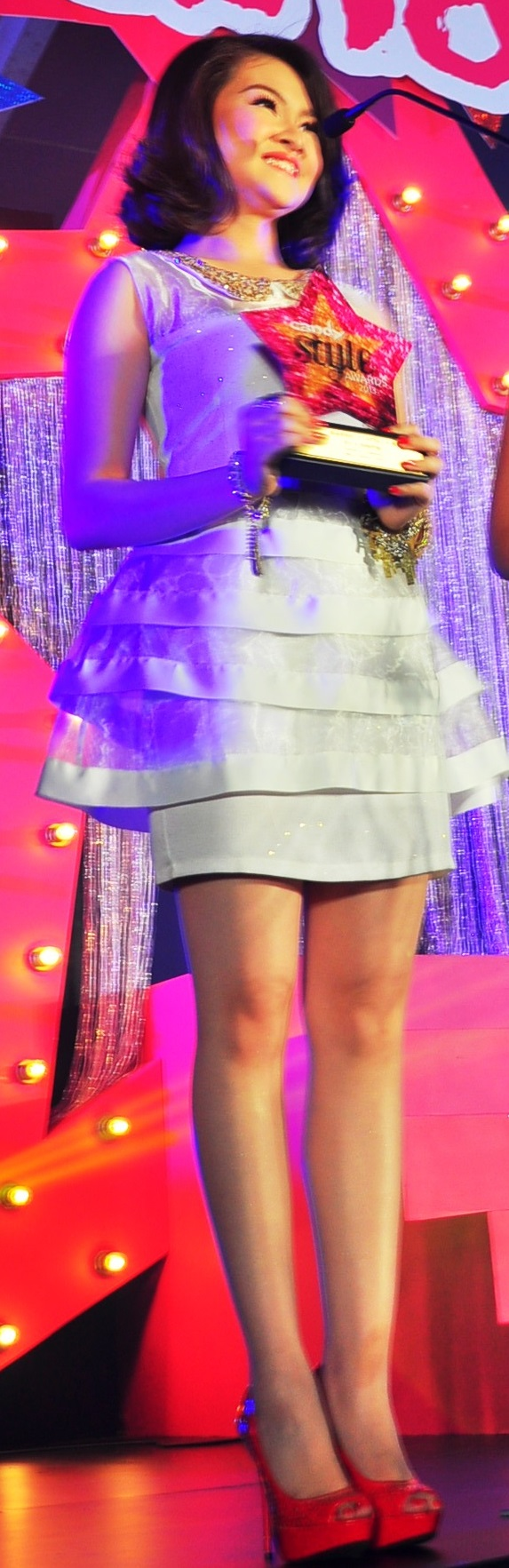
Forteza in 2013

In 2007, Forteza debuted as an actress in Shake, Rattle, and Roll 9, where she played the younger version of Roxanne Guinoo’s character. She then made her television debut at the age of 12 in 2009, where she played young Jodi in GMA Network's remake of the 2003 South Korean television drama series Stairway to Heaven. In the same year, she appeared in multiple films, such as Patient X, Ang Darling Kong Aswang, Wapakman, and Puntod, where she won the PMPC Star Awards New Movie Actress of the Year. Forteza then bagged her first television lead role as Cyndi Gomez in First Time.

Forteza’s career progressed in the early 2010s through the subsequent television series, such as Pilyang Kerubin, Reel Love Presents Tween Hearts, Nita Negrita, Ikaw Lang ang Mamahalin, Luna Blanca, Paroa: Ang Kwento ni Mariposa, Anna Karenina, and Genesis. Her film appearances include Si Agimat at si Enteng Kabisote, Tween Academy: Class of 2012, The Road, Ang Panday 2, the two 38th Metro Manila Film Festival entries Sosy Problems and Si Agimat, si Enteng Kabisote, at si Ako, and My Little Bossings.

In 2013, Forteza debuted as a singer through her self-titled album Barbie Forteza under MCA Records with the carrier single Meron Ba, which was used as the theme song for GMA Network's Koreanovela Big.

=== 2014–2021: Critical acclaim ===
In 2014, Forteza starred in the PMPC Star Awards for Television Best Daytime Drama Series The Half Sisters opposite Thea Tolentino. The series ran for two years. She also appeared in the independent films Full Moon and Mariquina. Her portrayal of a shoemaker's daughter in the latter earned her acclaim, and she won the Best Supporting Actress award in the New Breed Category of the 10th Cinemalaya Independent Film Festival.

In 2016, she won the Best Actress Award in 36th Fantasporto International Film Festival when she portrayed a sea gypsy for the indie film, Laut.

=== 2022–present: Mainstream recognition ===
She gained widespread recognition for her role in the 2022 fantasy drama series Maria Clara at Ibarra, where her on-screen partnership with actor David Licauco garnered significant public support. Building on the success of their partnership, they went on to work together in the film That Kind of Love and in several television projects, including Maging Sino Ka Man and Pulang Araw.

== Philanthropy ==
Forteza celebrated her birthday with kids of the Philippine Children Medical Center in 2014. She is one of the goodwill ambassadors for Smile Train Philippines. In 2018, she made a surprise visit to Smile Train Philippines Christmas Party, bringing gifts for the children as part of the event.

Forteza and her on-screen partner David Licauco were named as newest ambassadors Save the Children Philippines in 2024, an NGO which helps improve the lives of the children.

In April 2025, she joined a back to back charity fun-run for the benefit of I Want to Share Foundation which helps children with cancer and finished a 5 kilometer run for Takbo Babae for woman's advocacy. She also completed a 10 kilometer run for Save the Children Philippines.

== Personal life ==
Forteza previously dated actors Miguel Tanfelix and Kiko Estrada. She was in a relationship with actor Jak Roberto from 2017 to 2024. The couple first worked in the romantic comedy TV series Meant to Be.

== Filmography ==
=== Film ===
Year	Title	Role	Note(s)	Ref.
2007	Shake, Rattle and Roll 9	Young Marionne	Segment: "Bangungot"	
2009	Puntod	Baby		
2009	Patient X	Sonia		
2009	Ang Darling Kong Aswang	Aileen		
2009	Wapakman	Patitang Meneses		
2010	Si Agimat at si Enteng Kabisote	Bratty		
2011	Tween Academy: Class of 2012	Kara		
2011	The Road	Ella		
2011	Ang Panday 2	Bilara		
2012	Sosy Problems	Becca		
2012	Si Agimat, si Enteng Kabisote at si Ako	Barbie		
2013	My Little Bossings	Rosy		
2014	Full Moon	Mica		
2014	Mariquina	Young Imelda		
2015	Saranghaeyo #ewankosau	Calixta "Kai" Luna		
2016	Laut	Nadia		
2016	Tuos	Dowokan		
2017	This Time I'll Be Sweeter	Erika		
2018	Almost a Love Story	Baneng		
2024	That Kind of Love	Milagros "Mila" Maharlika		
2025	P77	Luna Caceres		
2025	Kontrabida Academy	Gigi		
2026	Until She Remembers	Angel		
2026	Saving Cherry	Cherry		

=== Television series ===
Year	Title	Role(s)	Note(s)	Ref.
2009	Stairway to Heaven	young Jodi Reyes		
2010	First Time	Cyndi Gomez		
2010	Pilyang Kerubin	Charity Santos / Charity Dimaano		
2010–12	Reel Love Presents: Tween Hearts	Barbara "Bambi" Fortez		
2010–11	Jillian: Namamasko Po	Maggie Molina		
2011	Nita Negrita	Antoinette "Netnet" Buenaventura / Nita Raymundo		
2011–12	Ikaw Lang ang Mamahalin	Katherine Somera / Mylene Fuentebella		
2012	Luna Blanca: Ang Ikalawang Yugto	teen Blanca Buenaluz		
2012–13	Paroa: Ang Kuwento ni Mariposa	Mariposa de Guzman / Princess Aira		
2013	Anna Karenina	Anna Karenina "Karen" Zamora / Anna Karenina "Karen" Villarama		
2013	Genesis	Faith		
2014–16	The Half Sisters	Diana Alcantara / Diana Valdicañas		
2015	Dangwa	Mary "Yaya May Flower" Catacutan		
2016	That's My Amboy	Maria Rosario "Maru" Tapang		
2017	Meant to Be	Maria Belinda "Billie" Bendiola		
2017	My Love from the Star	Herself		
2018	Super Ma'am	Pearly		
2018	Inday Will Always Love You	Happylou "Inday" Fuentes		
2019	Kara Mia	Kara Lacson		
2019	Love You Two	Venus		
2020–21	Anak ni Waray vs. Anak ni Biday	Ginalyn Agpangan Escoto		
2021	Heartful Café	Corazon "Cors"		
2022	Mano Po Legacy: The Family Fortune	Stephanie "Steffy" Dy		
2022	Mano Po Legacy: Her Big Boss	Stephanie "Steffy" Dy		
2022–23	Maria Clara at Ibarra	Maria Clara "Klay" Infantes		
2023	Maging Sino Ka Man	Monique Santos / Dino		
2024	Pulang Araw	Adelina "Chinita" dela Cruz		
2025	Beauty Empire	Noreen Alfonso		
2026	Honor Thy Mother	Patricia Monique Aragon Dela Cruz		

=== Television variety shows ===
Year	Title	Note(s)	Ref.
2009–10	SOP	Performer	
2010–13	Party Pilipinas	Performer / Co-host	
2013–15	Sunday All-Stars	Performer / Co-host	
2015–19	Sunday PinaSaya	Supporting cast / Co-host	
2020; 2021–present	All-Out Sundays	Guest (2020); Main host / Performer (since 2021)	
2023–25	It's Showtime	Guest / Performer / Judge	

=== Television comedy shows ===
Year	Title	Role(s)	Ref.
2010	JejeMom	Angelene "Angel" Arevalo	
2012	Tweets for My Sweet	Adele Reyes	
2013–16	Vampire ang Daddy Ko	Girlie / Boyong	
2016–18	Pepito Manaloto	KatKat	
2019	Daddy's Gurl	Pureza	
2023	Happy Together	Michelle Mendoza	

=== Television anthologies ===
Year	Title	Role(s)	Note(s)	Ref.
2009–10	Dear Friend: My Christmas List	Abby / Abigail		
2010	Maynila: Step Yes, Step No	Carly		
2010	Claudine: Madrasta	Eliza		
2011	Spooky Nights: Ang Manananggala (Battle of the Half-Sisters)	Marvi		
2012	Maynila: True as Gold	Mira		
2012	Spooky Nights: Kalansay	Cheska		
2012	Maynila: Bet Kita	Pam		
2012	Magpakailanman: Chef with no Hands (The Maricel Apatan Story)	young Maricel Apatan		
2012	Maynila: Love Express	Unknown		
2013	Maynila: Trust in Love	Unknown		
2013	Maynila: Room for Love	Geri		
2013	Maynila: Prinsesa ng Pag-ibig	Prince / Princess		
2013	Maynila: Tibok at First Sight	Abby		
2013	Maynila: Care Giver	Unknown		
2013	Maynila: My Brother's Lover	Jenny		
2013	Magpakailanman: Kambal na Sapi	Cristine		
2014	Maynila: Spirit of the Heart	Carrie		
2014	Maynila: Love Pretends	Carla		
2014	Wagas: Randolf and Mel Love Story	Mel		
2014	Maynila: Love in Between	Rachel		
2014	Maynila: Mimay Luv	Mimay		
2014	Maynila: One True Heart	Erin		
2014	Maynila: Queen of My Heart	Lauren		
2014	Wagas: Ang Mga Pag-ibig ni Datu Ambiong	Unknown		
2015	Maynila: Finding Mr. Right	Apple		
2015	Maynila: Status, It's Complicated!	Monique		
2016	Dear Uge: My Yaya Poser	May		
2016	Magpakailanman: Anak sa Mundo ng Droga	Ava		
2017	Eat Bulaga!'s Lenten Presentation: Mansyon	Yayen Neruda		
2017	Daig Kayo ng Lola Ko: Tatay Pitong at Pilyong Nokyo	Starla		
2017	Tadhana: Beauty and Bahrain	Mimay		
2017	Maynila: Love Potion	Drew		
2018	Magpakailanman: Ang Babaeng Tinimbang Ngunit Sobra (The Melinda Mara Story)	Melinda "Dang" Mara		
2018	Tadhana: Ola Kala	Jessica		
2018	APT Entertainment Lenten Presentation: Elehiya	Lucia		
2018	Wagas: Love at Panganib (The Erick and Gia Fernandez Love Story)	Gia Fernandez		
2018	Daig Kayo ng Lola Ko: Snow White and the Seven Dwarfs	Snow White		
2018	Maynila: My Sister's Secret	Elvie		
2018	Daig Kayo ng Lola Ko: Okay Ka, Genie Ko!	Genie Lyn		
2019	Daig Kayo ng Lola Ko: Lola Enchanted	Genie Lyn		
2019	Magpakailanman: Ang Pagmulat ng Binulag na Kasambahay (The Bonita Baran Story)	Bonita "Bonet" Baran		
2019	Wagas Presents: Wait Lang... Is This Love?	Mayumi "Yummy" Bubuyog		
2020	Daig Kayo ng Lola Ko: Sa Ilalim ng Buwan	Kayla		
2020	Magpakailanman: My Everlasting Love (The Joji and Alyssa Mendoza Story)	Alyssa Mendoza		
2021	I Can See You: The Lookout	Emma Castro		
2021	Daig Kayo ng Lola Ko: Captain Barbie	Captain Barbie		
2021	Regal Studio Presents: My Birthday Wish	Joana		
2022	Magpakailanman: My Bipolar Mom	Ashley		
2022	Daig Kayo ng Lola Ko: Lelang and Me	Scarlet / Luningning		
2022	Daig Kayo ng Lola Ko: Bida Kontrabida	Sleeping Beauty		
2023	Daig Kayo ng Lola Ko: Lady and Luke	Lady		
2026	Paskong Pinoy		Episode: "A Perfect Christmas"	

== Discography ==
=== Albums ===
Year	Title	Album details
2013	Meron Ba	Released: April 2013; Label: MCA Music; Formats: CD, digital download

== Awards and recognitions ==
Performance Awards
Year	Award-giving body	Category	Nominated work	Result	Ref.
2023	Seoul International Drama Awards	Outstanding Asian Star Prize	Maria Clara at Ibarra	Nominated	
2023	25th Gawad PASADO Awards	PinakaPASADOng Aktres sa Telebisyon	Maria Clara at Ibarra	Won	
2023	25th Gawad PASADO Awards	PinakaPASADOng Dangal ng Kabataan	Maria Clara at Ibarra	Won	
2023	12th Northwest Samar State University Students' Choice Awards for Radio and Television	Best Actress in Primetime Teleserye	Maria Clara at Ibarra	Won	
2023	The 5th Gawad Lasallianeta	Most Outstanding Actress in a Drama Series	Maria Clara at Ibarra	Nominated	
2023	7th GEMS Awards 2023	Best Performance by an Actress in a Lead Role (TV Series)	Maria Clara at Ibarra	Won	
2023	Platinum Stallion National Media Awards	Best Drama Actress	Maria Clara at Ibarra	Won	
2023	4th VP Choice Awards	TV Actress of the Year	Maria Clara at Ibarra	Nominated	
2022	3rd Annual TAG Awards Chicago	Best Actress	Maria Clara at Ibarra	Nominated	
2022	LionhearTV RAWR Awards	Actress of the Year	Maria Clara at Ibarra	Nominated	
2022	LionhearTV RAWR Awards	Bida ng Taon	Maria Clara at Ibarra	Nominated	
2020	LionhearTV RAWR Awards	Bida ng Taon	Anak ni Waray vs. Anak ni Biday	Nominated	
2017	4th PEP List Awards	Female Comedy Star of the Year (Editor's Choice)	Herself	Won	
2017	19th Gawad PASADO Awards	Pinakapasadong Katuwang na Aktres	Tuos	Won	
2017	40th Gawad Urian Awards	Best Supporting Actress	Tuos	Nominated	
2017	The EDDYS	Best Supporting Actress	Tuos	Nominated	
2017	Luna Award	Best Supporting Actress	Tuos	Nominated	
2017	Young Critics Circle	Best Performance by Male or Female, Adult or Child, Individual or Ensemble in Leading or Supporting Role	Tuos	Nominated	
2017	Young Critics Circle	Duo Performance: Best Performance by Male or Female, Adult or Child, Individual or Ensemble in Leading or Supporting Role (shared with Nora Aunor)	Tuos	Nominated	
2017	9th Ani ng Dangal Awards	Ani ng Dangal Awardee	Laut	Won	
2016	7th Inquirer Indie Bravo! Awards	Inquirer's Indie Bravo Awardee	Laut	Included	
2016	36th Fantasporto International Film Festival	Best Actress	Laut	Won	
2015	38th Gawad Urian Awards	Best Supporting Actress	Mariquina	Nominated	
2014	Cinemalaya Awards	Best Supporting Actress	Mariquina	Won	
2010	26th PMPC Star Awards for Movies	New Movie Actress of the Year	Puntod	Won	

Special Awards
Year	Award giving body	Category	Result	Ref.
2023	Asia's Royalty Awards	Most Admired and Superb Actress of the Year	Won	
2022	Business Mirror	The 2022 Honor Roll	Included	
2022	LionhearTV	The Year's 11 Most Memorable Female Performances	Included	
2021	2nd Annual TAG Awards Chicago	Best Loveteam (with Jak Roberto)	Nominated	
2019	PMPC Star Awards for Movies	Movie Love Team of the Year (Almost a Love Story shared with Derrick Monasterio)	Nominated	
2018	Anak TV Awards	Makabata Star 2018	Won	
2018	YES! Magazine	100 Most Beautiful Stars	Included	
2017	31st PMPC Star Awards for TV	German Moreno Power Tandem (with Jak Roberto)	Won	
2016	Walk of Fame Philippines	Eastwood City Walk of Fame Awardee	Included	
2014	6th PMPC Star Awards for Music	Best New Female Recording Artist	Nominated	
2013	Candy Magazine Awards	Most Stylish Rising Star	Won	
2013	Candy Magazine Awards	Most Stylish BFF with Bea Binene	Won	
2013	32nd Annual Huwarang Ina Awards	Most Outstanding Female Teleserye Artist	Nominated	
2012	YES! Magazine	100 Most Beautiful Stars	Included	
2012	2nd Yahoo! OMG Awards	Most Promising Actress of the Year	Nominated	
2012	Party Pilipinas Most Liked Awards	Most Liked Loveteam with Derrick Monasterio	Nominated	
2011	YES! Magazine	100 Most Beautiful Stars	Included	
2010	FAMAS Award	German Moreno Youth Achievement Awardee	Won	
2010	1st Yahoo! OMG Awards	Awesome Young Actress	Won	
2010	Google Zeitgeist 2010	Top 10 Fastest Rising People	Top 2	
2010	FAMAS Award	Most Animated Celebrity of the Night	Won	
