= Maging Sino Ka Man (2023 TV series) =

2023 Philippine television drama series

- Title card
- Also known as: Love the Way You Are
- Genre: Romantic drama; Action
- Based on: Maging Sino Ka Man (1991) by Eddie Rodriguez
- Written by: Mark Duane Angos; John Kenneth de Leon; Benjamin Benson Logronio
- Directed by: Enzo Williams
- Creative director: Aloy Adlawan
- Starring: Barbie Forteza; David Licauco
- Theme music composer: Rey Valera
- Opening theme: "Maging Sino Ka Man" by Hannah Precillas
- Country of origin: Philippines
- Original language: Tagalog
- No. of episodes: 40

Production
- Executive producer: Darling Pulido-Torres
- Cinematography: Elmer Despa
- Camera setup: Multiple-camera setup
- Running time: 23–43 minutes
- Production company: GMA Entertainment Group

Original release
- Network: GMA Network
- Release: September 11 – November 3, 2023

Maging Sino Ka Man (transl. whoever you may be / international title: Love the Way You Are) is a 2023 Philippine television drama action romance series broadcast by GMA Network. The series is based on the 1991 Philippine film of the same title. Directed by Enzo Williams, it stars Barbie Forteza and David Licauco. It premiered on September 11, 2023, on the network's Telebabad line up. The series concluded on November 3, 2023, with a total of 40 episodes.

The series is streaming online on YouTube.

== Cast and characters ==
Cast

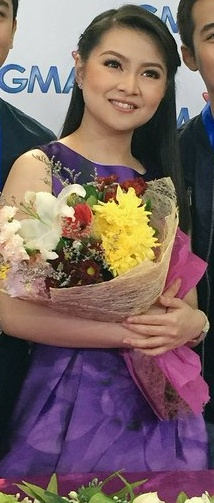
Barbie Forteza

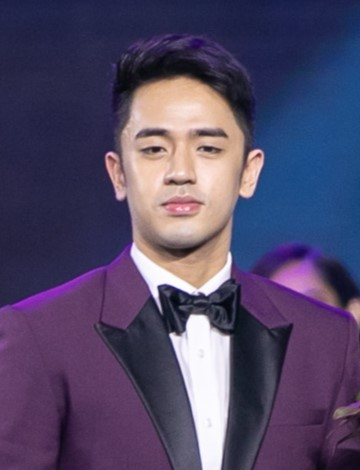
David Licauco

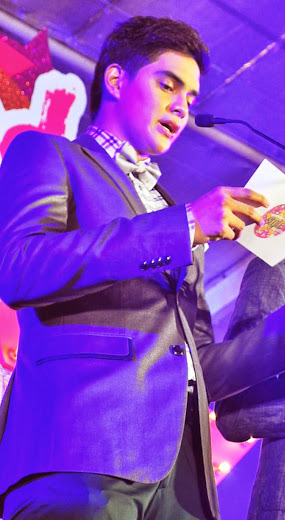
Juancho Triviño

Lead cast

- Barbie Forteza as Monique Salazar Santos-Macario / Dino
- David Licauco as Ricardo "Carding" Macario

Supporting cast

- Juancho Triviño as Gilberto "Gilbert" Arnaiz
- Faith da Silva as Bettina "Betty" Ramirez
- Mikoy Morales as Gordon "Bagli" Libag
- Jean Garcia as Belinda Salazar-Arnaiz / Belinda Salazar-Santos
- E.R. Ejercito as Franklin "Frank" Abalos
- Jeric Raval as Alexander "Alex" Torres / Alex Gerona
- Jean Saburit as Shonda
- Juan Rodrigo as Miguelito "Miguel" Arnaiz
- Antonio Aquitania as Jonas
- Rain Matienzo as Tetay
- Ice Reyes as Loleng Macario
- TG Daylusan as Kulot
- Brianna Advincula as Peklat
- Kenji San Pablo as Hika
- Trisha Andrada as Antok

Guest cast

- Tonton Gutierrez as Georgino "George" Santos
- Al Tantay as Osmundo Salazar
- Wendell Ramos as Richard "Chad" Macario
- Paolo Paraiso as Ben Delgado
- Alice Dixson as Claudette
- Cassandra Lavarias as younger Monique
- Mika Salamanca as Sarah

== Production ==
Principal photography commenced in July 2023. Filming concluded in October 2023.

== Ratings ==
According to AGB Nielsen Philippines' Nationwide Urban Television Audience Measurement People in Television Homes, the pilot episode of Maging Sino Ka Man earned an 11.4% rating. The final episode scored an 11.3% rating.

== Accolades ==
Accolades received by Maging Sino Ka Man
Year	Award	Category	Recipient	Result	Ref.
2024	5th VP Choice Awards	TV Series of the Year (Primetime)	Maging Sino Ka Man	Nominated	
2024	5th VP Choice Awards	TV Actor of the Year (Primetime)	David Licauco	Nominated	
2024	5th VP Choice Awards	TV Actress of the Year (Primetime)	Barbie Forteza	Nominated	
2024	5th VP Choice Awards	TV Supporting Actor of the Year	Mikoy Morales	Nominated	
2024	5th VP Choice Awards	TV Supporting Actress of the Year	Faith Da Silva	Nominated	
2025	37th PMPC Star Awards for Television	German Moreno Power Tandem Award	Barbie Forteza David Licauco	Won	
