= Sa Puso ni Dok =

2014 Philippine television drama series

- Title card
- Also known as: Village Doctor
- Genre: Medical drama
- Directed by: Adolf Alix Jr.
- Starring: Dennis Trillo; Bela Padilla
- Country of origin: Philippines
- Original language: Tagalog
- No. of episodes: 6

Production
- Production locations: Manila, Philippines
- Camera setup: Multiple-camera setup
- Running time: 30–45 minutes
- Production company: GMA News and Public Affairs

Original release
- Network: GMA Network
- Release: August 24 – September 28, 2014

Sa Puso ni Dok (transl. in the heart of doc / international title: Village Doctor) is a 2014 Philippine television drama medical series broadcast by GMA Network. Directed by Adolf Alix Jr., it stars Dennis Trillo and Bela Padilla. It premiered on August 24, 2014 on network's Sunday Grande line up. The series concluded on September 28, 2014, with a total of six episodes.

== Cast and characters ==
Cast

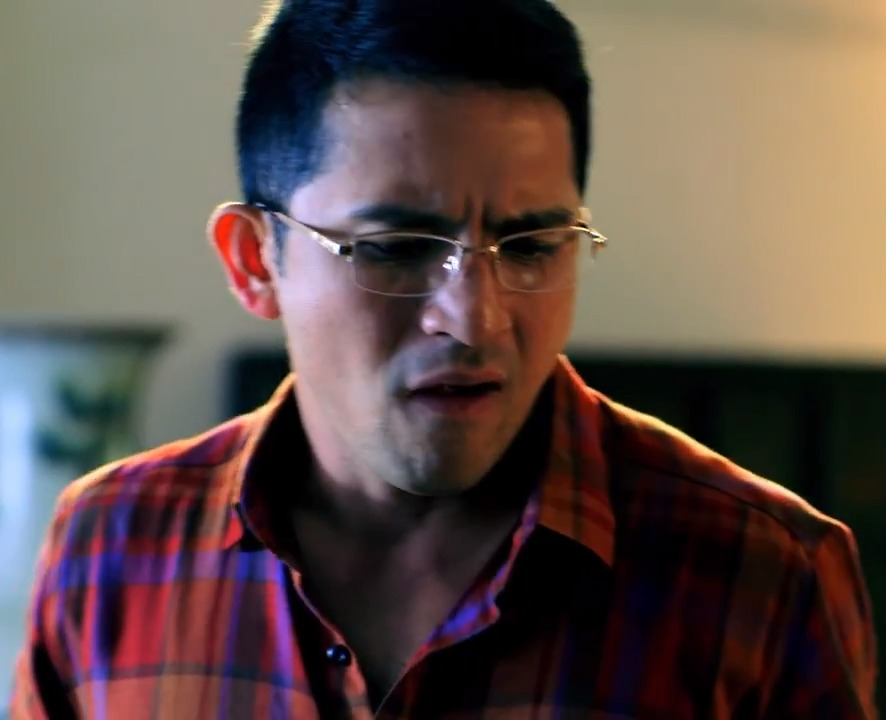
Dennis Trillo

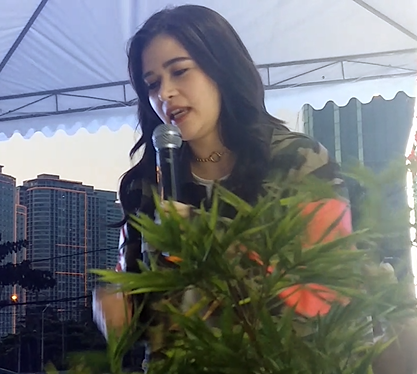
Bela Padilla

Lead cast

- Dennis Trillo as Dennis
- Bela Padilla as Gab

Supporting cast

- Menggie Cobarrubias as Dela Cruz
- Milkcah Wynne Nacion as Baby
- Maey Bautista as Veronica
- Gigi Locsin as Loring
- Stephanie Sol as Carla
- AJ Dee as Jomar

== Production ==
Principal photography commenced on May 26, 2014.

== Ratings ==
According to AGB Nielsen Philippines' Mega Manila household television ratings, the pilot episode of Sa Puso ni Dok earned a 15% rating. The final episode scored a 12.9% rating.

== Accolades ==
Accolades received by Sa Puso ni Dok
Year	Award	Category	Recipient	Result	Ref.
2015	29th PMPC Star Awards for Television	Best Drama Mini-Series	Sa Puso ni Dok	Nominated	
