= Beauty Empire =

2025 Philippine television drama series

- Title card
- Genre: Drama
- Created by: Real Florido; Rona Co
- Directed by: Mark Sicat dela Cruz
- Starring: Barbie Forteza
- Country of origin: Philippines
- Original language: Tagalog
- No. of episodes: 44 (Viu); 52 (GMA Network)

Production
- Production location: South Korea
- Camera setup: Multiple-camera setup
- Running time: 21–38 minutes
- Production companies: GMA Public Affairs; CreaZion Studios

Original release
- Network: Viu
- Release: June 16 – August 29, 2025
- Network: GMA Network
- Release: July 7 – October 2, 2025

Beauty Empire is a 2025 Philippine television drama series streaming on Viu and broadcast by GMA Network. Directed by Mark Sicat dela Cruz, it stars Barbie Forteza. The series first premiered on Viu on June 16, 2025. The final episode was released on August 29, 2025, for a total of 44 episodes. The television broadcast premiered on July 7, 2025, on GMA Network's Prime line up. The series concluded its television run on October 2, 2025, with a total of 52 episodes.

The series is also streaming online on YouTube.

== Premise ==
New beauty industry CEO, Noreen Alfonso plans to destroy the business empire of the people who have wronged her in the past.

== Cast and characters ==
Cast

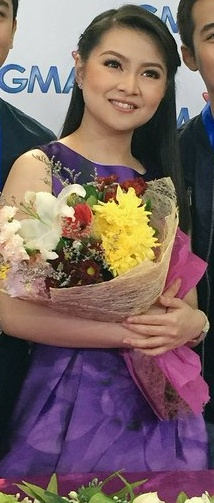
Barbie Forteza

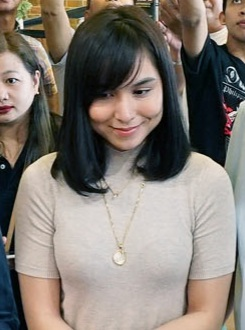
Kyline Alcantara

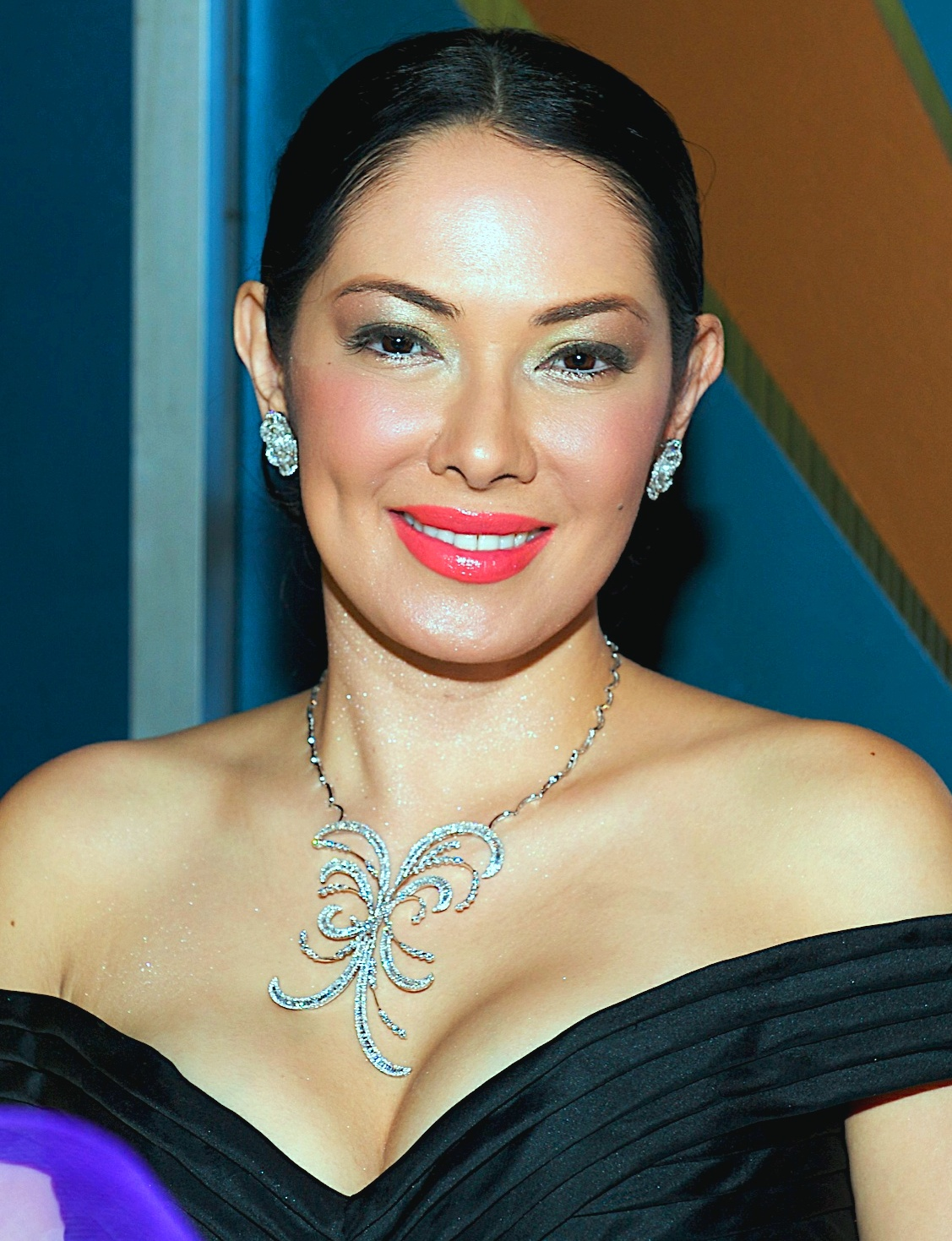
Ruffa Gutierrez

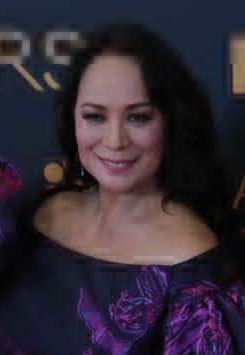
Gloria Diaz

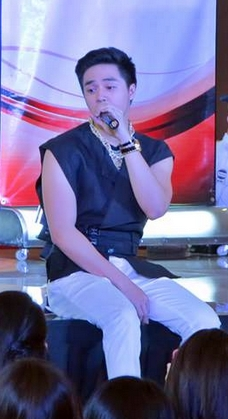
Sam Concepcion

Lead cast

- Barbie Forteza as Noreen Alfonso

Supporting cast

- Kyline Alcantara as Shari De Jesus
- Ruffa Gutierrez as Velma Imperial
- Gloria Diaz as Clara
- Sam Concepcion as Migoy
- Choi Bo-min as Alex
- Chai Fonacier as Kriselda
- Sid Lucero as Eddie

Recurring cast

- Isay Alvarez as Eva Alfonso
- Gabby Padilla as Helena Alfonso
- Alex Agustin as Martika
- Paolo O’hara as Gardo
- Polo Laurel as Gino
- Arkel Mendoza as Jessie
- Divine Aucina as Jana
- Aaron Maniego as Sylvester
- Noemi Gonzales as Charing

Guest cast

- David Licauco as Javier

== Episodes ==
Beauty Empire episodes
No.	Title	Original release date
1	"The Formula of Success"	June 16, 2025
2	"The Formula of Clout-Chasing"	June 17, 2025
3	"The Sweet Girl Attitude"	June 18, 2025
4	"The Formula of Revenge"	June 19, 2025
5	"The Art of Beauty War"	June 23, 2025
6	"The Newbie VS The Royalty"	June 24, 2025
7	"Back to the Land of Beauty"	June 25, 2025
8	"Not-So Beautiful Problems"	June 26, 2025
9	"Beauty and Madness"	June 30, 2025
10	"The Face of Beauty"	July 1, 2025
11	"Sneaky Little Brat"	July 2, 2025
12	"Scandal"	July 3, 2025
13	"And the winner is..."	July 7, 2025
14	"The Q & A"	July 8, 2025
15	"Circle of Untrust"	July 9, 2025
16	"Divide and Conquer"	July 10, 2025
17	"Secrets and Blood"	July 14, 2025
18	"Dressed to Kill"	July 15, 2025
19	"Blast"	July 16, 2025
20	"Aftershock"	July 17, 2025
21	"Pretty When It Hurts"	July 21, 2025
22	"Vanity"	July 22, 2025
23	"The Gloss of Guilt"	July 23, 2025
24	"Unfiltered"	July 24, 2025
25	"Glamour and Grief"	July 28, 2025
26	"Camera-Ready Confession"	July 29, 2025
27	"Contoured Chaos"	July 30, 2025
28	"Queenmaker"	July 31, 2025
29	"Dethroned"	August 4, 2025
30	"Lament"	August 5, 2025
31	"The Night of Fallen Beauty"	August 6, 2025
32	"Who is Marie Armani?"	August 7, 2025
33	"High Heels, High Stakes"	August 11, 2025
34	"Tears in the Tiara"	August 12, 2025
35	"Serene"	August 13, 2025
36	"Full Circle"	August 14, 2025
37	"The Gilded Plot"	August 18, 2025
38	"Condemned"	August 19, 2025
39	"Beauty Gambit"	August 20, 2025
40	"Faultline"	August 21, 2025
41	"The Perfume and the Poison"	August 25, 2025
42	"Unyielding"	August 26, 2025
43	"In the Flesh, In the Power"	August 27, 2025
44	"There is No Formula"	August 29, 2025

== Development ==
The series was announced in January 2025. The director Mark Sicat dela Cruz and cast members were announced in April 2025. Series creator, Rona Co states the Filipino narration "aims to inspire people to reevaluate their own standards on beauty and give the viewers, a perspective on the beauty industry in the Philippines".

== Production ==
Principal photography commenced in May 2025, in South Korea.

== Release ==
Beauty Empire premiered on Viu on June 16, 2025. The television broadcast aired on July 7, 2025 on GMA Network.

== Ratings ==
According to AGB Nielsen Philippines' Nationwide Urban Television Audience Measurement People in television homes, the pilot episode of Beauty Empire on GMA Network earned a 4.7% rating. The final episode scored a 4.8% rating.

== Accolades ==
Accolades received by Beauty Empire
Year	Award	Category	Recipient	Result	Ref.
2025	Asian Academy Creative Awards	Best Cinematography (National)	Beauty Empire	Won	
