= That Kind of Love =

2024 Philippine romantic comedy film

- Theatrical release poster
- Directed by: Catherine O. Camarillo
- Written by: Ellis Catrina
- Screenplay by: Ellis Catrina
- Starring: Barbie Forteza; David Licauco
- Cinematography: Eli Balce
- Edited by: Ramil Pasbe
- Music by: Emerzon Texon
- Production companies: Pocket Media Productions, Inc.; Happy Infinite Productions, Inc.
- Distributed by: Regal Entertainment
- Release dates: May 25, 2024 (Jinseo Arigato International Film Festival); July 10, 2024 (Philippines)
- Running time: 136 minutes
- Country: Philippines
- Language: Tagalog

That Kind of Love is a 2024 Philippine romantic comedy film. Directed by Catherine O. Camarillo from a screenplay written by Ellis Catrina, it stars Barbie Forteza and David Licauco. The film was released at the Jinseo Arigato International Film Festival held in Nagoya, Japan on May 25, 2024, and theatrically in the Philippines on July 10 the same year.

== Premise ==
Mila (Barbie Forteza), a dating coach helps Adam (David Licauco) search for a special someone. But happens when she falls for him instead.

== Cast and characters ==
Main cast

- Barbie Forteza as Milagros "Mila / Ms. Love Coach" Maharlika
- David Licauco as Adam "Mr. Perfect" de Dios

Supporting cast

- Al Tantay
- Arlene Muhlach
- Kaila Estrada
- Divine Aucina
- Ivan Carapiet
- Jef Gaitan

== Production ==
=== Filming ===
Filming of the movie took place in the Philippines and South Korea.

== Release ==
That Kind of Love was released theatrically on July 10, 2024, in the Philippines. Priorly, the film also served as a spotlight entry to the Jinseo Arigato International Film Festival held in Nagoya, Japan on May 25–26, 2024.
