= Heartful Café =

2021 Philippine television drama series

- Title card
- Genre: Drama; Romantic comedy
- Created by: R.J. Nuevas
- Written by: J-Mee Katanyag; Ken de Leon; Jimuel dela Cruz
- Directed by: Mark Sicat dela Cruz
- Creative director: Aloy Adlawan
- Starring: Julie Anne San Jose; David Licauco
- Theme music composer: Ann Figueroa
- Opening theme: "See You at the Café" by Julie Anne San Jose
- Country of origin: Philippines
- Original language: Tagalog
- No. of episodes: 40

Production
- Executive producer: James Ryan L. Manabat
- Cinematography: Apollo Vallega Anao
- Camera setup: Multiple-camera setup
- Running time: 25–35 minutes
- Production company: GMA Entertainment Group

Original release
- Network: GMA Network
- Release: April 26 – June 18, 2021

Heartful Café is a 2021 Philippine television drama romantic comedy series broadcast by GMA Network. Directed by Mark Sicat dela Cruz, it stars Julie Anne San Jose and David Licauco, it premiered on April 26, 2021 on the network's Telebabad line up. The series concluded on June 18, 2021, with a total of 40 episodes.

The series is streaming online on YouTube.

== Cast and characters ==
Cast

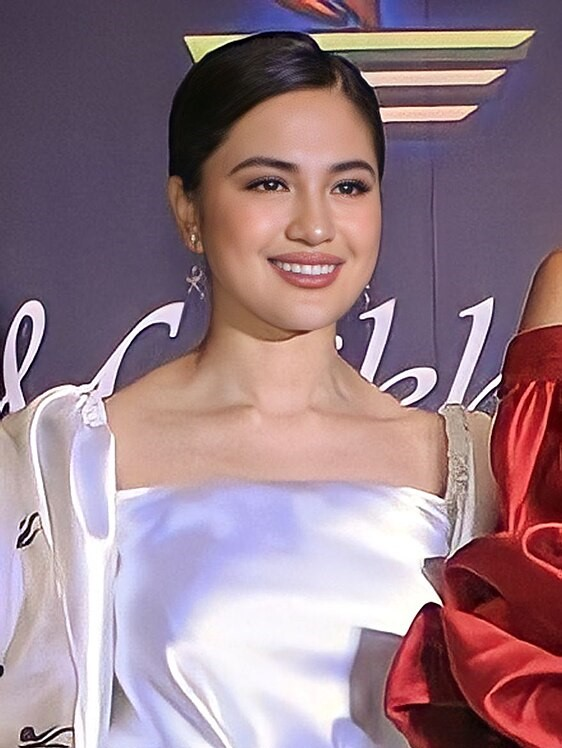
Julie Anne San Jose

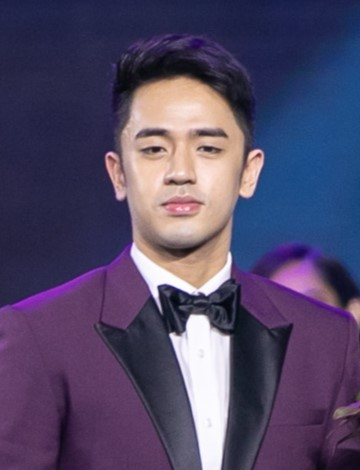
David Licauco

Lead cast

- Julie Anne San Jose as Heart Fulgencio
- David Licauco as Ace Nobleza

Supporting cast

- Edgar Allan Guzman as Uno Ynares
- Zonia Mejia as Soledad "Sol" Fulgencio
- Jamir Zabarte as Salvador "Buddy" Portales
- Ayra Mariano as Marcelina "Mars" Sawingsawing
- Victor Anastacio as Roco
- Angel Guardian as Charity

Guest cast

- Shyr Valdez as Chona
- Ina Feleo as Zowie
- Kate Valdez as Diana
- Migo Adecer as Max / Charles
- DJ Durano as Jeremiah
- Barbie Forteza as Cors
- Jak Roberto as Jasper
- Richard Reynoso as Raffy
- Rosemarie Sarita as Belen
- Nicole Chan as Virgo
- Klea Pineda as Ivy
- Jeric Gonzales as Warren
- Gold Aceron as Garci
- Nikki Co as Sebastian / Seb
- Candy Pangilinan as Andi
- Camille Prats as Bettina

== Production ==
Principal photography commenced in April 2021.

== Ratings ==
According to AGB Nielsen Philippines' Nationwide Urban Television Audience Measurement People in television homes, the pilot episode of Heartful Café earned a 14.1% rating.
