= Mariquina (film) =

2014 Philippine independent film

- Directed by: Milo Sogueco
- Screenplay by: Jerrold Tarog
- Story by: Henry Burgos; Gay Ace Domingo; Milo Sogueco
- Starring: Mylene Dizon; Ricky Davao; Barbie Forteza
- Cinematography: Sasha Palomares
- Edited by: Benjamin Tolentino
- Music by: Jerrold Tarog
- Release date: August 2, 2014
- Country: Philippines

Mariquina is a 2014 Philippine drama film directed by Milo Sogueco from a screenplay by Jerrold Tarog. Set in the City of Marikina, it stars Mylene Dizon, Ricky Davao, and Barbie Forteza.

Entered into the New Breed category of the 10th Cinemalaya Independent Film Festival, the film tells the story of a Marikina shoemaker's daughter coming to terms with her grief in the wake of her father's suicide.

Forteza received Cinemalaya's Best Supporting Actress award in the New Breed category.

The film's screenplay was written by Jerrold Tarog, based on a story written by Sogueco, Henry Burgos, and Gay Ace Domingo. Sasha Palomares served as director of photography, earning critical praise along with Sogueco for the film's cinematography.

Other prominently featured cast members include Che Ramos, Bing Pimintel, Dennis Padilla, and Mel Kimura. Former Philippine First Lady Imelda Marcos also appears as herself in a short cameo.
