= Paroa: Ang Kuwento ni Mariposa =

Philippine television drama series

- Title card
- Also known as: The Story of Mariposa
- Genre: Fantasy drama
- Developed by: Dode Cruz; Lobert Villela
- Written by: Glaiza Ramirez; Gilbeys Sardea
- Directed by: Mark A. Reyes V
- Creative director: Jun Lana
- Starring: Barbie Forteza
- Theme music composer: Vehnee Saturno
- Opening theme: "Kahit Man Lang sa Pangarap" by Julie Anne San Jose
- Country of origin: Philippines
- Original language: Tagalog
- No. of episodes: 85

Production
- Executive producer: Rebya Upalda
- Production locations: Manila, Philippines
- Cinematography: Jay Linao
- Camera setup: Multiple-camera setup
- Running time: 30–45 minutes
- Production company: GMA Entertainment TV

Original release
- Network: GMA Network
- Release: November 5, 2012 – March 1, 2013

Paroa: Ang Kuwento ni Mariposa (transl. Paroa: the story of Mariposa / international title: The Story of Mariposa) is a Philippine television drama fantasy series broadcast by GMA Network. Directed by Mark A. Reyes V, it stars Barbie Forteza in the title role. It premiered on November 5, 2012 on the network's Telebabad line up. The series concluded on March 1, 2013, with a total of 85 episodes.

The series is streaming online on YouTube.

== Cast and characters ==
Cast

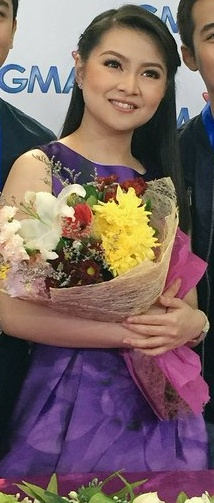
Barbie Forteza

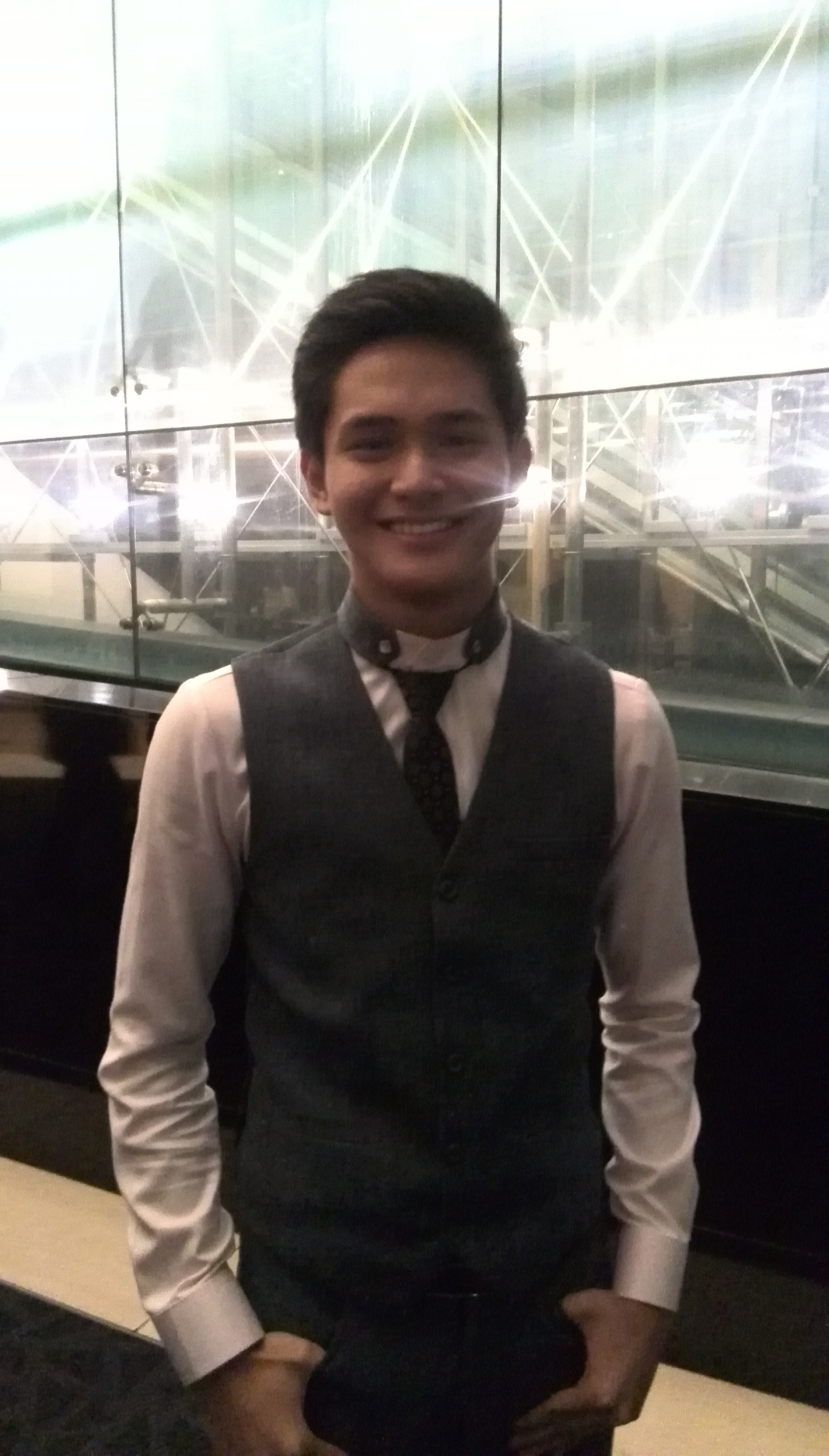
Ruru Madrid

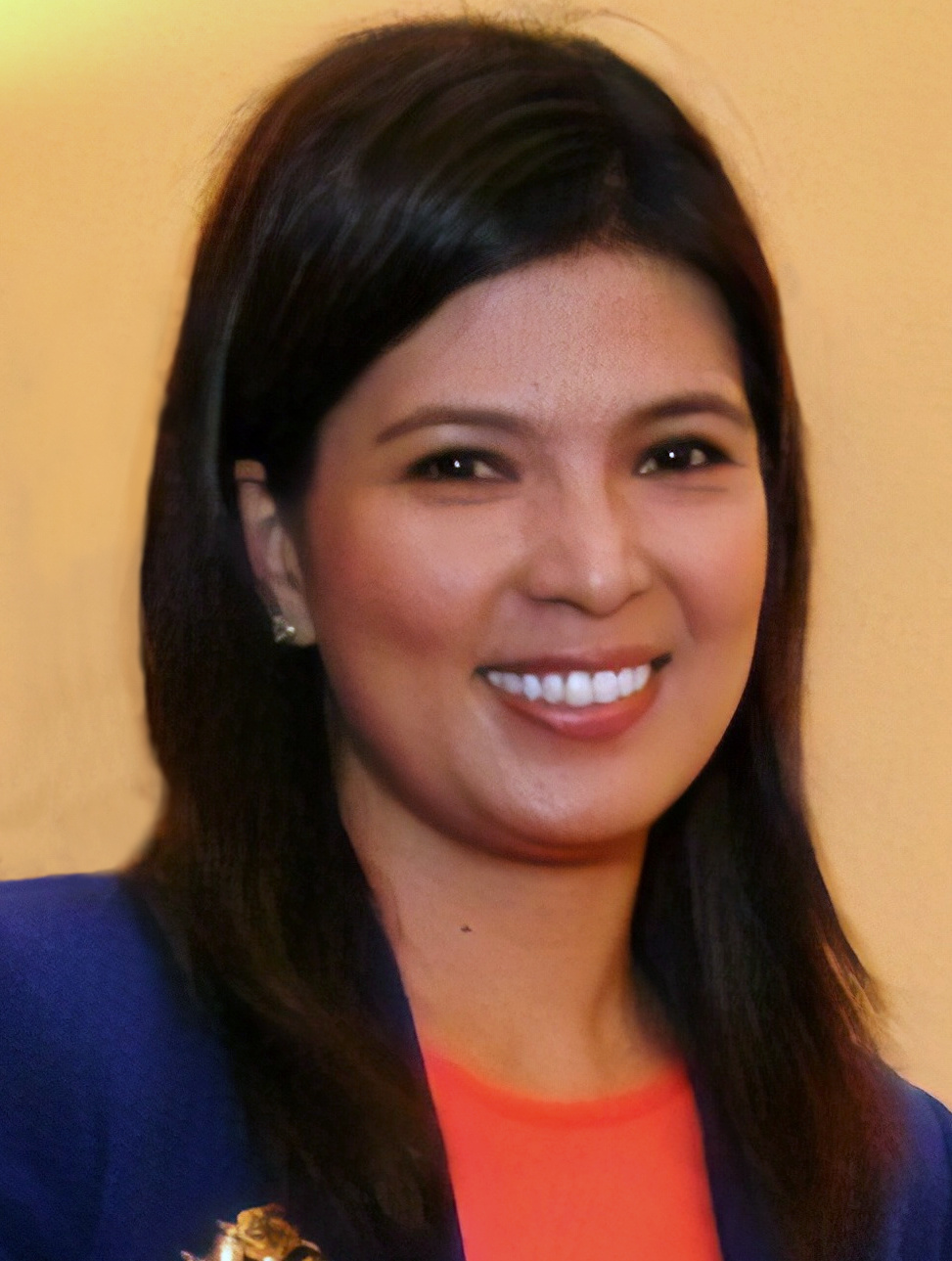
Lani Mercado

Lead cast

- Barbie Forteza as Mariposa de Guzman / Aira

Supporting cast

- Derrick Monasterio as Iñigo Villamor
- Joyce Ching as Rebecca "Becca" Sarmiento
- Ruru Madrid as Rasul
- Miguel Tanfelix as Joko Santos
- Tanya Garcia as Aurora
- Agot Isidro as Amalia de Guzman
- Alicia Mayer as Rosanna Villamor
- Maritoni Fernandez as Belen Sarmiento
- Lexi Fernandez as Giselle Sarmiento
- Lani Mercado as Dahlia
- Gerard Pizarras as Adon

Recurring cast

- Marc Acueza as Desmond
- Bianca Umali as Leah
- Shyr Valdez as Lani Santos
- German Moreno as Apo Pasko
- Jhoana Marie Tan as Lila
- Shermaine Santiago as Talisay
- Gino dela Peña as Roman
- Rita Daniela as Lizzy
- Rhen Escaño as Betty
- Janna Trites as Tess
- Robert Villar as Uno
- Isabel "Lenlen" Frial as Pao-pao
- Neil Ryan Sese as Armando Villamor

Guest cast

- Kryshee Grengia as younger Mariposa
- Ashley Cabrera as younger Becca
- Byron Ortile as younger Joko

== Production ==
Principal photography concluded on February 27, 2013.

== Ratings ==
According to AGB Nielsen Philippines' Mega Manila household television ratings, the pilot episode of Paroa: Ang Kuwento ni Mariposa earned a 12.1% rating. The final episode scored a 12.1% rating.
