= Pilyang Kerubin =

2010 Philippine television drama series

- Title card
- Also known as: My Silly Angel
- Genre: Comedy drama; Fantasy
- Developed by: Jun Lana
- Directed by: Maryo J. de los Reyes; Andoy Ranay
- Starring: Barbie Forteza
- Opening theme: "Hulog ng Langit" by Angelika dela Cruz
- Ending theme: "Pag-Ibig na Tunay" by Julie Anne San Jose
- Country of origin: Philippines
- Original language: Tagalog
- No. of episodes: 60

Production
- Executive producer: Angie C. Castrence
- Camera setup: Multiple-camera setup
- Running time: 15–43 minutes
- Production company: GMA Entertainment TV

Original release
- Network: GMA Network
- Release: June 7 – August 27, 2010

Pilyang Kerubin (transl. mischievous cherub / international title: My Silly Angel) is a 2010 Philippine television drama comedy fantasy series broadcast by GMA Network. Directed by Maryo J. de los Reyes and Andoy Ranay, it stars Barbie Forteza in the title role. It premiered on June 7, 2010 on the network's Telebabad line up. The series concluded on August 27, 2010, with a total of 60 episodes.

The series is streaming online on YouTube.

== Cast and characters ==
Cast

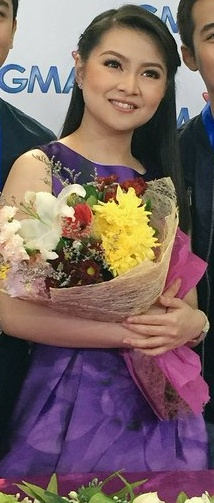
Barbie Forteza

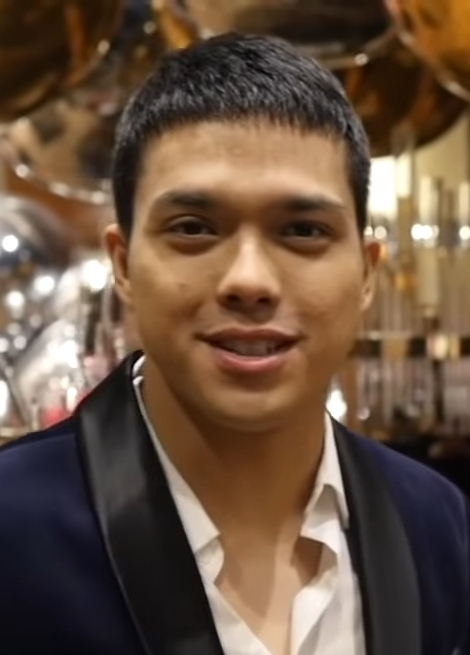
Elmo Magalona

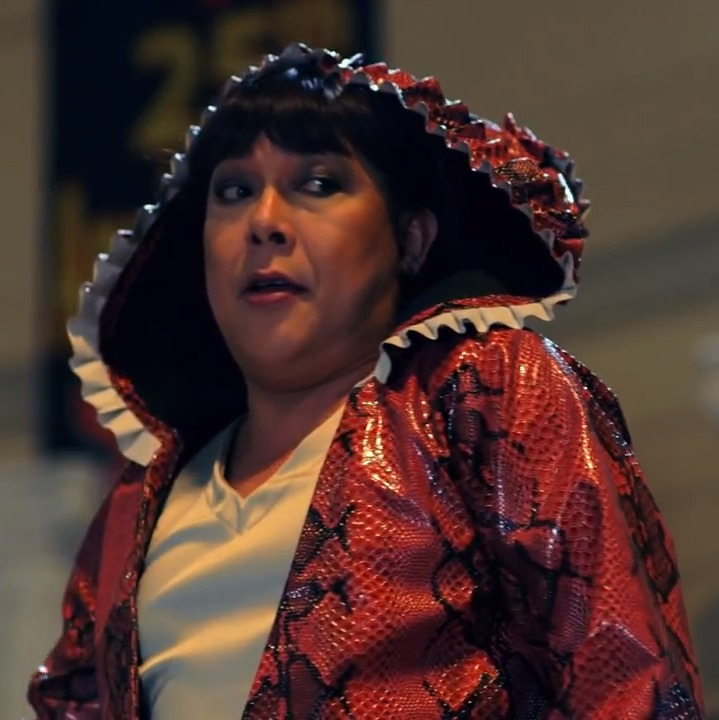
John Lapus

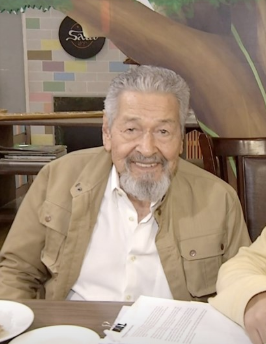
Eddie Garcia

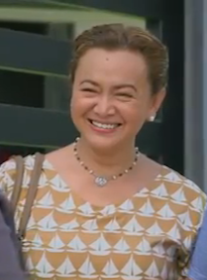
Sharmaine Buencamino

Lead cast

- Barbie Forteza as Charity Santos

Supporting cast

- Joshua Dionisio as Michael Alvarez
- Elmo Magalona as Aaron Alejandrino
- Raymart Santiago as Arman Santos
- Angelika Dela Cruz as Melissa Alejandrino-Santos
- Paolo Contis as Jonas Alejandrino
- Lotlot de Leon as Maring Ignacio
- Ina Feleo as Lailani Santos
- Joel Torre as Dante Garcia
- Sunshine Garcia as Adrianna Peralta
- Shamaine Centenera-Buencamino as Ason Garcia
- Jewel Mische as Rosalie Dela Cruz
- Maureen Larrazabal as Azura
- John Lapus as Aroo
- Janno Gibbs as San Pedro
- Eddie Garcia as Potpot

Guest cast

- Yogo Singh as Noah
- Maricel Soriano as Regina
- Mark Bautista as Gabriel
- Marvin Agustin as Adante
- Camille Prats as Rosa
- Jennica Garcia as Betty
- Iza Calzado as Sandra
- TJ Trinidad as Albert
- Carl Guevarra as Carding
- Wynwyn Marquez as Lily
- Yasmien Kurdi as Hannah
- Jan Marini Alano as Marissa
- Iwa Moto as Eva
- Julio Diaz as Gaston
- Jiro Manio as Rodjun
- Daria Ramirez as Virginia
- Jim Paredes as Ronaldo Esteban
- Pinky Marquez as Theresa
- Antonio Aquitania as Eugene

== Production ==
Principal photography commenced in May 2010.

== Ratings ==
According to AGB Nielsen Philippines' Mega Manila People/Individual television ratings, the pilot episode of Pilyang Kerubin earned a 14% rating. The final episode scored a 14.9% rating.
