= Maria Clara at Ibarra =

2022 Philippine television drama series

- Title card in 2023
- Also known as: Maria Clara and Ibarra
- Genre: Historical drama; Portal fantasy
- Created by: Annette Gozon-Valdes; R.J. Nuevas; Suzette Doctolero
- Based on: Noli Me Tángere and El Filibusterismo by José Rizal
- Written by: Suzette Doctolero; J-mee Katanyag; Brylle Tabora; Benson Logronio; Melchor Escarcha; Zita Garganera
- Directed by: Zig Dulay
- Creative director: Aloy Adlawan
- Starring: Barbie Forteza; Julie Anne San Jose; Dennis Trillo
- Theme music composer: Simon Tan
- Opening theme: "Babaguhin ang Buong Mundo" by Julie Anne San Jose
- Country of origin: Philippines
- Original language: Tagalog
- No. of episodes: 105

Production
- Executive producer: Rosie Lyn M. Atienza
- Camera setup: Multiple-camera setup
- Running time: 25–45 minutes
- Production company: GMA Entertainment Group

Original release
- Network: GMA Network
- Release: October 3, 2022 – February 24, 2023

Maria Clara at Ibarra (transl. / international title: Maria Clara and Ibarra) is a Philippine television drama fantasy series broadcast by GMA Network, based on the novels Noli Me Tángere and El Filibusterismo by José Rizal. Directed by Zig Dulay, it stars Barbie Forteza, Julie Anne San Jose and Dennis Trillo. It follows Maria Clara "Klay" Infantes, a Gen-Z nursing student who gets transported into the setting of Noli Me Tangere and El Filibusterismo. The series premiered on October 3, 2022, on the network's Telebabad line up. The series concluded on February 24, 2023, with a total of 105 episodes.

The series is streaming online on YouTube and Netflix.

== Cast and characters ==
Cast

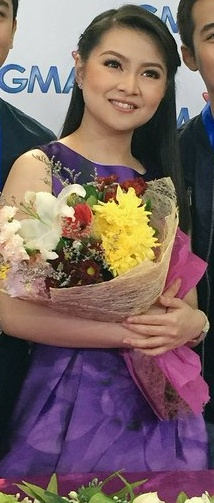
Barbie Forteza

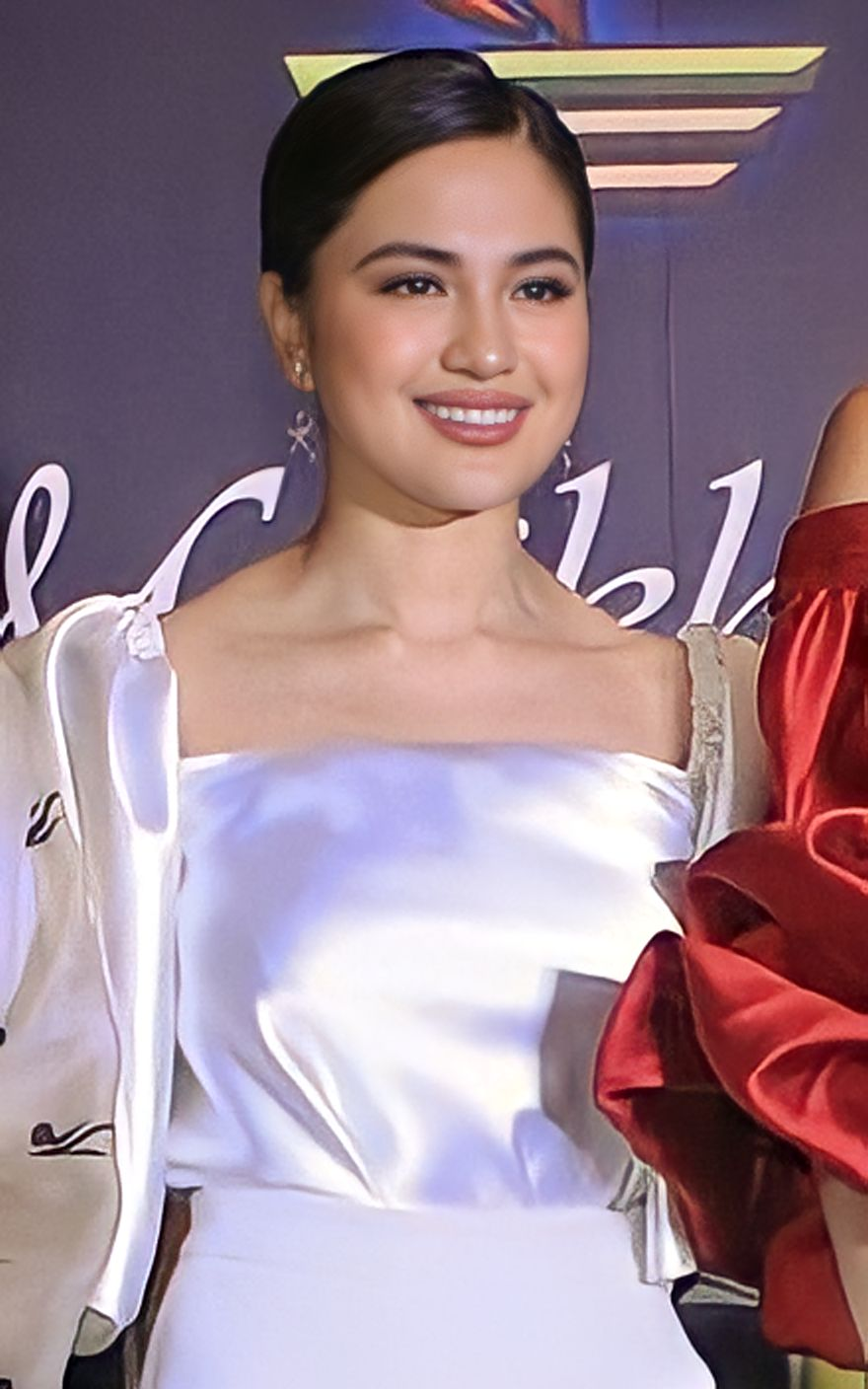
Julie Anne San Jose

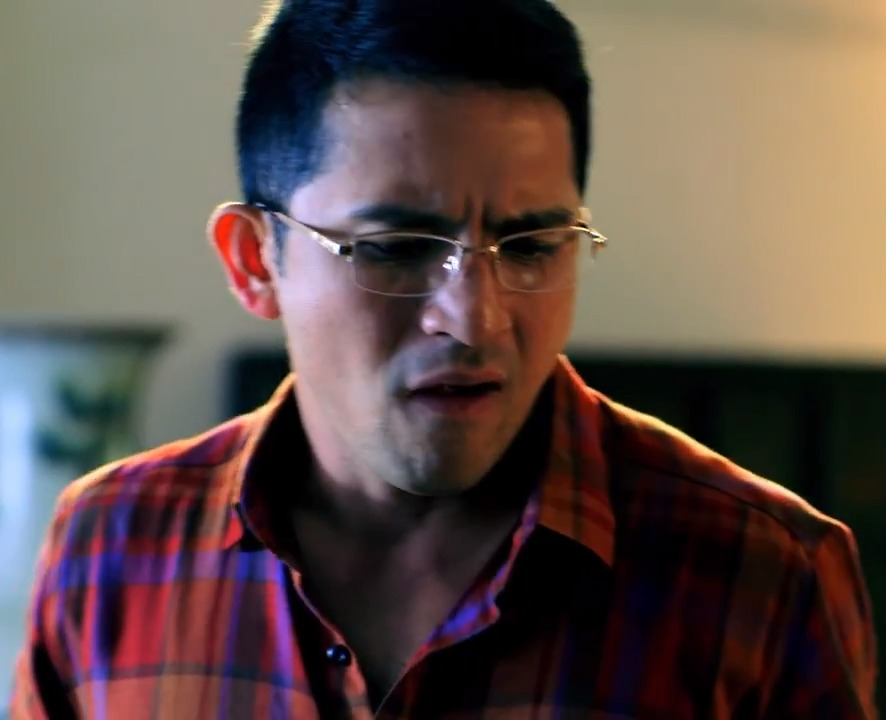
Dennis Trillo

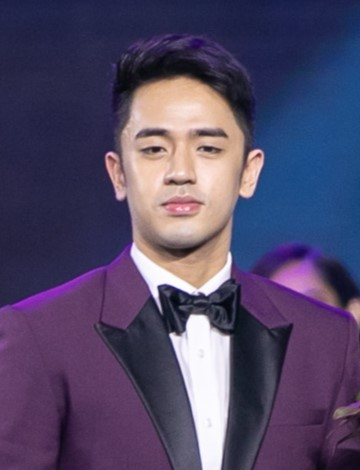
David Licauco

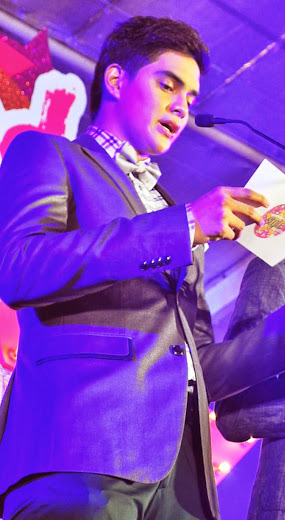
Juancho Triviño

Lead cast

- Barbie Forteza as María Clara "Klay" Infantes
- Julie Anne San Jose as María Clara "Clarita" de los Santos y Alba / Clarisse Torres
- Dennis Trillo as Juan Crisóstomo Ibarra y Magsalin / Simoun / Ibarra Gonzalo "Barry" Torres

Supporting cast

- David Licauco as Fidel de los Reyes y Maglipol / Albino
- Manilyn Reynes as Narcisa "Narsing" Infantes-Asunción
- Juancho Triviño as Bernardo Salvi
- Rocco Nacino as Elías
- Tirso Cruz III as Padre Dámaso Verdolagas
  - Dax Augustus as younger Padre Dámaso
- Andrea Torres as Narcisa "Sisa"
- Juan Rodrigo as Santiago "Tiago" de los Santos
  - Ranty Portento as younger Tiago
- Ces Quesada as Tía Isabel
- Khalil Ramos as Basilio
  - Stanley Abuloc as younger Basilio
- Pauline Mendoza as Juliana "Juli" de Dios
  - Arlhei Janmira Dapilos as younger Juli
- Kim de Leon as Isagani
- Arnold Reyes as Telesforo "Kabesang Tales" de Dios
- Julia Pascual as Paulita Gómez
- Lou Veloso as José R. Torres
- Dennis Padilla as Adong Aglipay
- Gilleth Sandico as Victorina de los Reyes de Espadaña
- Giovanni Baldisseri as the alférez
- Raquel Pareño as Consolación
- Tanya Garcia as Pía Alba
- Carlos Siguion Reyna / Gino Ilustre as the captain general
- Karenina Haniel as Victoria
- Robert Ortega as Ronald Asunción
- JM San Jose as Elías Infantes Asunción
- Bobby Andrews as Antonio "Anton" Villarama
- Charo Calalo as Geraldine Cruz-Villarama
- Lei Angela Ollet as Anica Cruz Villarama
- Lyra Micolob as Stacy Joaquín
- Jeniffer Maravilla as Sinang
- Hannah Precillas as Iday
- Ira Ruzz as Neneng
- Kian Co as Crispín
- Johnny Revilla as Teniente Miguel Guevara
- Chai Fonacier as Lucía
- Kirst Viray as Pablito
- Kiel Rodriguez as Renato
- Marlon Liwanag as a gravedigger
- Jovy Vieja as Andeng
- Francis Mata as Anastasio "Pilósopo Tasio"
- Rain Matienzo as Salome
- Roland Sanchez as the "yellow man"
- Roven Alejandro as Tiburcio de Espadaña
- Brent Valdez as Alfonso Linares
- Paul Jake Paule as Lucas
- Red Magno as Padre Sibyla
- Elan Villafuerte as Kapitán Basilio
- Janna Trias as Tica
- Froilan Manto as Filipo Lino
- Victor Sy as Rafael Ibarra
- Edmund Dreu Santiago as the gobernadorcillo
- Archi Adamos as the alcalde
- Ian Segarra as a teacher
- Raion Sandoval as Pedro
- Jo-Ann Morallos as the Sta. Clara nun
- James Lomahan as a Guardia civil officer
- Arrian Labios as a leper
- Felicity Kyle Napuli as Tala
- Elle Ramirez as Pepay
- Jon Lucas as Juanito Peláez
- Eddie Ngo as Quiroga
- Lucho Ayala as Abraham "Ben-Zayb" Ibañez
- Nanding Josef as Florentino
- Raymond Gorospe as Írene
- Don Umali as Camorra
- Ces Aldaba as Custodio de Salazar
- Rosemarie Sarita as Sor Teresa
- Marnie Lapus as Martina
- Luri Vincent Nalus as Hernando
- Joanhna Bago as Hermana Penchang

== Development ==
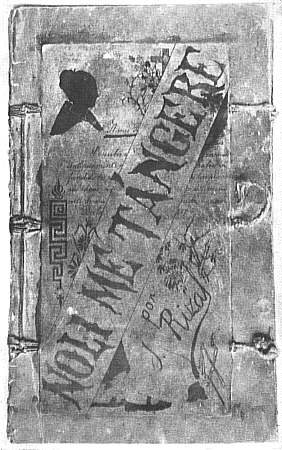
Front cover of Noli Me Tángere

The show took three years in production and was pitched as early as September 2020, beginning around August to October 2019, based on the novels Noli Me Tángere and El filibusterismo. According to GMA Network's vice president for drama, Cheryl Ching-Sy, it was initially conceptualized by Annette Gozon - the network's senior vice president - as an adaptation of the novels around March 2019. Eventually, the creative team added a Gen Z character into the story to grab the attention of the young audiences. Head writer Suzette Doctolero was later brought in to develop the concept as "Noli Me Tángere with a modern twist". Although pre-production was delayed in 2020 when the COVID-19 pandemic struck the Philippines, it was nearly completed by early 2022.

It was slated to run for 20 weeks, from October 2022 to February 2023. Before its pilot week, supervising producer Helen Rose Sese mentioned that a second season was planned should the series become a hit.

With most of the story being set in 19th century Philippines during the Spanish colonial period, the show consulted historians Ramon Guillermo and Gonzalo Campoamor II for its set and costume design as well as the script. The 19th century scenes were filmed in multiple locations across Ilocos, Batangas, Laguna, Bulacan, Tanay, and Pampanga. Scenes including the exterior of the vintage houses were mostly shot in Ilocos Norte and Ilocos Sur, particularly in Sarrat, Santa Maria, Sitio Remedios, and Calle Crisólogo. The interior of Kapitan Tiago's house was shot in Taal, Batangas. The production design team built a bahay kubo to film scenes in Sisa's house, using vintage photos of old huts as references. While filming at Calle Crisólogo, the crew were caught up in the 2022 Luzon earthquake and production was temporarily halted.

=== Casting ===
On July 8, 2022, it was announced that Barbie Forteza, Dennis Trillo, and Julie Anne San Jose were cast in an upcoming historical portal fantasy drama based on José Rizal's novels. The rest of the supporting cast was announced on August 3, which was followed by the first teaser on September 13.

On January 16, 2023, the cast for the new characters in the El filibusterismo arc was announced, which included Khalil Ramos, Pauline Mendoza, Kim de Leon and Julia Pascual.

== Production ==
Principal photography commenced in August 2022. Filming concluded on February 4, 2023.

=== Costumes ===
Over 200 costumes were created for the series, including the pañuelo and traje de mestiza. The costumes were designed by Janra Raroque, Roko Arceo and Mikaella Borinaga. According to Raroque, seventy percent of the series' preparation went into researching for the production design, which was supervised by Gino Gonzales, the author of the book Fashionable Filipinas. During the initial costume concept designing, they focused on historical accuracy, avoiding neon colors and traveling to Lumban and Bulacan to find piña fabric manufacturers and designers respectively. Due to the rarity of expert Filipino costume designers in pre-colonial and Spanish period costumes, the stylists faced difficulties in searching for those in menswear clothes and jewelries. The character Elias's kattukong or tabungaw was crafted by Ilocano hatter Teofilo Garcia; they also had to find craftsmen specializing in gold tamburin and repoussé.

Each cast member had to wear multiple layers of clothing for their costumes - Trillo had to wear at least three layers. San Jose wore hair extensions to keep her hair styled up. The folds on Forteza's costumes change depending on the year, from the late 1860s to the early 1870s. San Jose and Forteza also learned the art of Abaniko for the series.

== Reception ==
=== Ratings ===
According to AGB Nielsen Philippines' Nationwide Urban Television Audience Measurement People in television homes, the pilot episode of Maria Clara & Ibarra earned a 15.1% rating. The final episode scored a 14.3% rating.

=== Critical response ===
The cast has also received good reviews for their acting, including Juancho Triviño. Triviño would later receive his first acting award nomination for his role at the 3rd Annual TAG Awards Chicago. Journalist Ricky Gallardo commended Barbie Forteza, who plays the main protagonist Klay, for evolving from "a dollish young star to a delightfully divine actress", regarding her as the brightest star of the season. Andrea Torres, who plays Sisa, received positive reception for her depiction of the character during a six-minute scene of her descent into insanity. Dennis Trillo, the actor for one of the show's main character and Noli Me Tangere's main protagonist Crisostomo Ibarra, was also applauded for his delivery of the character's speech on patriotism in the series' seventieth episode.

Historian Xiao Chua stated the series' adaptation of Rizal's works despite some departure from the original novels, commending the addition of Klay as a character that "gives excitement." In a column for The Manila Times, he also described Torres's portrayal of Sisa as a performance that "made [him] cry so much" and "[feel] her pain and her love, [which] is what the founders of the nation felt reading Rizal for the first time."

Since its release, there has been a growing interest in the Noli Me Tángere and El filibusterismo novels among Filipino teachers and students.

Due to its success, the series was extended for more episodes, airing its final episode from February 17 to February 24, 2023.

== Accolades ==
Accolades received by Maria Clara at Ibarra
Year	Award	Category	Recipient	Result	Ref.
2022	3rd Annual TAG Awards Chicago	Best Actress	Barbie Forteza	Nominated	
2022	3rd Annual TAG Awards Chicago	Best Supporting Actor	Juancho Triviño	Won	
2022	3rd Annual TAG Awards Chicago	Best Supporting Actress	Julie Anne San Jose	Nominated	
2022	Gawad Dangal Filipino Awards	Best TV Director of the Year	Zig Dulay	Won	
2022	PPOP Awards	Pop TV Youth Educational Program of the Year	Maria Clara at Ibarra	Won	
2023	Asian Academy Creative Awards	Best Theme Song - National Award	Simon Peter Tan (written/arranged) and Rocky Gacho and sung by Julie Anne San Jose	Won	
2023	The 5th Gawad Lasallianeta	Most Outstanding Actor in a Drama Series	Dennis Trillo	Nominated	
2023	The 5th Gawad Lasallianeta	Most Outstanding Teleserye	Maria Clara at Ibarra	Won	
2023	The 5th Gawad Lasallianeta	Green Zeal Award of Excellence	Maria Clara at Ibarra	Won	
2023	The 5th Gawad Lasallianeta	Most Outstanding Actress in a Drama Series	Julie Anne San Jose	Nominated	
2023	The 5th Gawad Lasallianeta	Most Outstanding Actress in a Drama Series	Barbie Forteza	Nominated	
2023	The 5th Gawad Lasallianeta	Most Outstanding Actress in a Drama Series	Andrea Torres	Nominated	
2023	7th GEMS Awards	Best Performance by an Actress in a Lead Role (TV Series)	Barbie Forteza	Won	
2023	7th GEMS Awards	Best Performance by an Actress in a Lead Role (TV Series)	Julie Anne San Jose	Nominated	
2023	7th GEMS Awards	Best Performance by an Actor in a Lead Role (TV Series)	Dennis Trillo	Won	
2023	7th GEMS Awards	Best TV Series	Maria Clara at Ibarra	Won	
2023	7th GEMS Awards	Best Performance by an Actor in a Supporting Role (TV Series)	Juancho Triviño	Won	
2023	7th GEMS Awards	Best Performance by an Actor in a Supporting Role (TV Series)	Rocco Nacino	Nominated	
2023	7th GEMS Awards	Best Performance by an Actress in a Supporting Role (TV Series)	Andrea Torres	Won	
2023	Platinum Stallion National Media Awards	Culturally Relevant TV Series	Maria Clara at Ibarra	Won	
2023	Platinum Stallion National Media Awards	Best Primetime Drama Series	Maria Clara at Ibarra	Won	
2023	Platinum Stallion National Media Awards	Best Drama Actor	Dennis Trillo	Won	
2023	Platinum Stallion National Media Awards	Best Drama Actress	Barbie Forteza	Won	
2023	Platinum Stallion National Media Awards	Best Actor in a Supporting Role	David Licauco	Won	
2023	Platinum Stallion National Media Awards	Best Actress in a Supporting Role	Andrea Torres	Won	
2023	4th VP Choice Awards	TV series of the year	Maria Clara at Ibarra	Nominated	
2023	4th VP Choice Awards	TV Actor of the Year	Dennis Trillo	Nominated	
2023	4th VP Choice Awards	TV Actress of the Year	Barbie Forteza	Nominated	
2023	4th VP Choice Awards	TV Supporting Actor of the Year	David Licauco	Won	
2023	4th VP Choice Awards	TV Supporting Actor of the Year	Juancho Triviño	Nominated	
2023	4th VP Choice Awards	TV Supporting Actress of the Year	Andrea Torres	Nominated	
2023	New York Festivals TV & Film Awards	Entertainment Program: Drama	Maria Clara At Ibarra	Bronze	
2023	12th NwSSU Students' Choice Awards for Radio and Television	Best Actress in a Primetime Teleserye	Barbie Forteza	Won	
2023	12th NwSSU Students' Choice Awards for Radio and Television	Best Supporting Actor in a Primetime Teleserye	David Licauco	Won	
2023	12th NwSSU Students' Choice Awards for Radio and Television	Best Supporting Actress in a Primetime Teleserye	Andrea Torres	Won	
2023	Knights of Rizal's 23rd International Assembly	Special citation	Maria Clara at Ibarra	Won	
2023	17th UP ComBroadSoc Gandingan Awards	Most Development-Oriented Drama Program (Special Citation)	Maria Clara at Ibarra	Won	
2023	17th UP ComBroadSoc Gandingan Awards	Most Development-Oriented Educational Program	Maria Clara at Ibarra	Won	
2023	6th Golden Laurel: The Batangas Province Media Awards	Best Drama Series	Maria Clara at Ibarra	Won	
2023	6th Golden Laurel: The Batangas Province Media Awards	Best Drama Actress	Barbie Forteza	Won	
2023	6th Golden Laurel: The Batangas Province Media Awards	Best Drama Actress	Julie Anne San Jose	Nominated	
2023	6th Golden Laurel: The Batangas Province Media Awards	Best Drama Actor	David Licauco	Nominated	
2023	Anak TV Seal Awards	Television Category - GMA	Maria Clara at Ibarra	Won	
2023	Anak TV Seal Awards	Household Favorite Programs	Maria Clara at Ibarra	Won	
2023	Anak TV Seal Awards	Makabata Stars - Male Television	David Licauco	Won	
2023	Anak TV Seal Awards	Makabata Stars - Female Television	Barbie Forteza	Won	
2023	Anak TV Seal Awards	Makabata Stars - Female Television	Julie Anne San Jose	Won	
2023	45th Catholic Mass Media Awards	Best Drama Series/Program	Maria Clara at Ibarra	Won	
2024	6th Gawad Lasallianeta	Most Outstanding Actress in a Drama Series	Barbie Forteza	Won	
2024	52nd Box Office Entertainment Awards	Primetime TV Drama Actor of the Year	Dennis Trillo	Won	
2024	52nd Box Office Entertainment Awards	Primetime TV Drama Actress of the Year	Barbie Forteza	Won	
2024	52nd Box Office Entertainment Awards	TV Supporting Actor of the Year	Tirso Cruz III	Won	
2025	37th PMPC Star Awards for Television	Best Primetime Drama Series	Maria Clara at Ibarra	Won	
2025	37th PMPC Star Awards for Television	Best Drama Actress	Barbie Forteza	Nominated	
2025	37th PMPC Star Awards for Television	Best Drama Actor	Dennis Trillo	Nominated	
2025	37th PMPC Star Awards for Television	German Moreno Power Tandem Award	Barbie Forteza David Licauco	Won	
