= Dennis Trillo =

Filipino actor (born 1981)

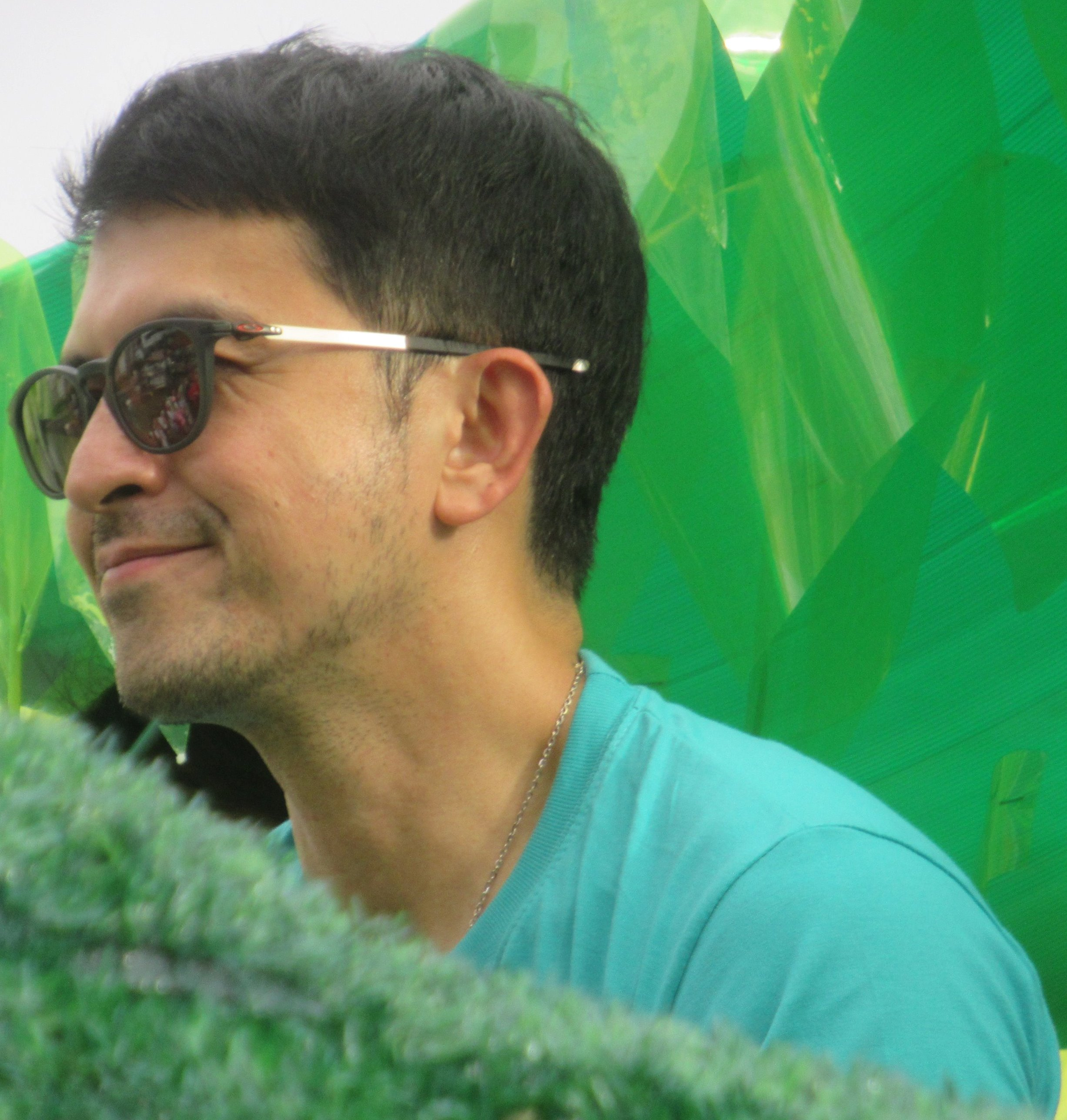
- Trillo in 2024
- Born: Abelardo Dennis Florencio Ho; May 12, 1981 (age 45); Quezon City, Metro Manila, Philippines
- Education: Miriam College, (BA)
- Occupations: Actor; singer; endorser; TV host
- Years active: 1999–present
- Agent(s): Sparkle GMA Artist Center (2003–present)
- Notable work: Aishite Imasu 1941: Mahal Kita; Felix Manalo; Mulawin; Darna (2005 TV series); Darna (2009 TV Series); My Husband's Lover; Temptation of Wife; On the Job: The Missing 8; Legal Wives; Green Bones; Pulang Araw; Sanggang-Dikit FR; Maria Clara at Ibarra
- Spouse: Jennylyn Mercado (m. 2021)
- Children: 3
- Musical career
- Genre: Pinoy pop
- Label: GMA Music

Abelardo Dennis Florencio Ho (born May 12, 1981), known professionally as Dennis Trillo (Tagalog pronunciation: [ˈtɾiljo]), is a Filipino actor, model and singer. He is also known as the Asia's Drama King for his acclaimed performances and wide range of roles in GMA Network drama series. Trillo has won 30 awards and 30 acting nominations, including Best Actor awards from FAMAS Awards, LUNA Awards, Gawad Urian Award, PMPC Star Award for Films, Golden Screen Awards, and Metro Manila Film Festival. Trillo became the First Filipino to win the Asian Star Prize at Seoul Drama International Awards chosen by the juries and Best Actor Winner at Asian Academy Creative Awards, winning Best Actor at National Category and Asia Category, beating 11 nominees across Southeast Asian countries and becoming the 13th Filipino actor to win all major acting Awards in the Philippines, joining veteran actors alongside Vilma Santos, Nora Aunor, Philip Salvador, Christopher De Leon, Lorna Tolentino, Sharon Cuneta, John Lloyd Cruz, Nida Blanca, Aga Muhlach, Richard Gomez, Elizabeth Oropesa, and Judy Ann Santos.

Trillo is known for his role as Eric del Mundo in the first ever gay-themed series on Philippine TV, My Husband's Lover, Juan Crisóstomo Ibarra y Magsalin "Simoun" in Netflix's Maria Clara at Ibarra, and Colonel Yuta Saitoh in Pulang Araw aired on GMA Network and on Netflix . He played a cross-dressing spy in the 2004 war film Aishite Imasu 1941: Mahal Kita. In May 2016, he appeared in another primetime television series, Juan Happy Love Story, opposite his Dwarfina co-star Heart Evangelista.

== Personal life ==
Dennis Trillo, born as Abelardo Dennis Florencio Ho on May 12, 1981, in Quezon City, is the son of Abelardo Leslie Ho, a Chinese Filipino from Dumaguete, Negros Oriental, and Florita Florencio, a Filipino. He completed his high school education at Jose Abad Santos Memorial School in Quezon City and attended grades 1–7 at the Ateneo De Manila University. For his college education, he enrolled at Miriam College, earning a B.A. in International Studies.

He has a son with his ex-girlfriend, Carlene Aguilar, born in 2007. Cristine Reyes and Trillo began dating in 2007 and later broke up in May 2009.

On November 15, 2021, Dennis Trillo married his longtime girlfriend, Jennylyn Mercado. Together, they have a daughter named Dylan Jade, born on April 25, 2022. He also legally adopted Alex Jazz, the son of his wife Jennylyn Mercado and actor Patrick Garcia.

In December 2024, Trillo and Mercado relaunched and re-branded their lounge, beauty salon and nail spa, with the new name DYLN Style Lounge at Barangay U.P. Campus, Quezon City.

== Career ==
=== 2000-2002: Beginnings with ABS-CBN ===
Prior to starting his career in show business, Trillo was once a member of the band Moyg. For a short period, he played the drums for the DIY band in Baguio. His career in entertainment started on ABS-CBN in 2001 when he was introduced as part of ABS-CBN's Star Circle (now known as Star Magic) batch 10 along with Bea Alonzo, Alfred Vargas and TJ Trinidad. He had minor roles in ABS-CBN's hit television soap operas Pangako Sa 'Yo and Sa Dulo ng Walang Hanggan.

=== 2003–2005: Breakthrough with GMA Network ===
After transferring to GMA Network and becoming a contract star, he landed his first role for the network in the youth-oriented drama Kahit Kailan where he played a supporting character named David. He was also cast in several outings like Twin Hearts and Love to Love.

In 2004, was cast in his first main character role in the fantasy show Mulawin as Gabriel, a half-human and half-Ravena. In film, Trillo landed his breakthrough performance when he starred in the Metro Manila Film Festival official entry Aishite Imasu 1941: Mahal Kita as a transgender woman during World War II. In this film he received his first acting award as Best Supporting Actor in the 30th Metro Manila Film Festival.

Following this recognition, he received five more Best Actor trophies from the Film Academy of the Philippines, the Filipino Academy of Movie Arts and Sciences, the PMPC Star Awards for Movies, Golden Screen Awards and the Young Critics Circle. He was also included in the third installment of Mano Po.

The following year, 2005, Trillo was paired with Angel Locsin in the 2005 television adaptation of Darna. He also starred in the afternoon family drama Now and Forever: Agos where he received a Best Drama Actor nomination from PMPC Star Awards for TV. That same year, he reprised his role for Mulawin: The Movie, and appeared in the film Blue Moon.

=== 2006–2010: Further television presence and music debut ===
In 2005, Trillo was cast as lead character in Etheria, where he portrayed the Sapirian prince, Raquim. Midway through the series, GMA announced that Trillo would be pulled from the show to once again star in another fantasy-themed television series Majika. In the end Trillo was allowed to complete Etheria. He also starred in the horror-suspense film Pamahiin and was included in the network's noontime show SOP as a co-host where he also played drums as part of the show's "Starband".

Trillo released his self-titled debut album in 2007 under IndiMusic. That same year, he made his fourth Lenten drama special for GMA Network under APT Entertainment entitled Unico Hijo. On August 21, 2007, he started taping for the fantasy series Zaido: Pulis Pangkalawakan with Aljur Abrenica and Marky Cielo.

On April 27, 2008, five thousand spectators witnessed the Battle of Mactan play, with Trillo playing Ferdinand Magellan at the Mactan, Cebu Shrine. The same year, Trillo joined the cast of Magdusa Ka, an afternoon soap opera which later earned an International Emmy nomination. Trillo also starred in the comic-based superhero series Gagambino. After Gagambino, he starred in two more primetime dramas: Adik Sa'Yo and the 2009 remake of Darna.

Trillo's hosting roles continued when he replaced Dingdong Dantes as a co-host in Season 5 of StarStruck in 2009. In 2010, he also began co-hosting the variety show, Party Pilipinas. He appeared in Sine Novela Presents: Gumapang Ka Sa Lusak opposite Jennylyn Mercado and portrayed Andrew Tantoco in the Philippine adaptation of the hit Korean series Endless Love.

=== 2011–2021: Established actor ===
In 2011, Trillo appeared in the romantic-fantasy series Dwarfina with Heart Evangelista. After playing the lead role in the Philippine adaptation of Temptation of Wife, Trillo was cast in his most controversial role to date as Eric del Mundo in the gay drama series My Husband's Lover. Trillo received one acting award from two nominations and a commendation from the Asian TV Awards.

After the success of the series, the cast of My Husband's Lover held a concert at the Araneta Coliseum named "One More Try: My Husband's Lover The Concert". The same year, Trillo and his screen partner Tom Rodriguez released their album titled TomDen, which is now a certified Platinum record according to the PARI with over 15,000 copies sold.

In 2014, he top-billed the primetime drama series Hiram na Alaala with Kapuso actress Kris Bernal. He also co-starred in the weekly medical drama Sa Puso ni Dok under GMA News & Public Affairs. Trillo visited ABS-CBN via his guesting in Kris TV to promote his 2015 movie You're Still The One alongside Maja Salvador, Ellen Adarna and Richard Yap under Regal Entertainment Inc. and Star Cinema. The same year, Trillo launched his first VIVA Films movie, Felix Manalo, where he received a Movie Actor of the Year award from the PMPC Star Awards for Movies.

After doing several heavy drama soap operas, Trillo starred in 2016 in the light drama series Juan Happy Love Story.

In 2021, Trillo starred in the cultural drama series Legal Wives where he played the role of a Maranao Muslim with Alice Dixson, Andrea Torres, and Bianca Umali as his wives.

Trillo starred in Erik Matti's crime thriller film, On the Job: The Missing 8 in 2021. He played the role of Roman, a prisoner temporarily released from prison to perform assassinations. For this film, Dennis wore a prosthetic over his nose, making it appear disfigured to immerse himself in his character.

=== 2022–present: Continued success ===
G starred as Crisostomo Ibarra, the main character in Jose Rizal's novels, Noli Me Tangere and El Filibusterismo in the TV drama Maria Clara at Ibarra.

In 2023, Trillo renewed his exclusive contract with GMA Network on 20th anniversary with the network. He stars in a reunion movie with his wife Jennylyn Mercado, titled Everything about My Wife, a romcom movie in February 2025

In 2024, he joined Pulang Araw, a war-drama series directed by Dominic Zapata with an ensemble cast of Alden Richards, Barbie Forteza, David Licauco and Sanya Lopez. Trillo played the role of Col. Yutah Saito, a leader of Japanese Imperial army. The series was aired on Netflix from July-December 2024.

Trillo returned to big screen with a prison-drama movie, Green Bones, directed by Zig Dulay with co-stars Ruru Madrid, Michael de Mesa, Dingdong Dantes and Wendell Ramos. Green Bones was an official entry of GMA Pictures to Metro Manila Film Festival 2024. For his role as Dom Zamora, he won Gawad Urian Award Best Actor award, Metro Manila Film Festival Award for Best Actor, Asian Academy Creative Award for Best Actor in a Leading Role and Best Actor at the International Golden Summit Excellence Award in Vietnam.

In June 2025, he starred in the action-drama series Sanggang-Dikit FR, directed by L.A Madridejos with Jennylyn Mercado, his wife. Trillo played the role of Antonion Tonio Conde, one of the police officer.

== Other ventures ==
=== Business ===
Trillo and Jennylyn Mercado , his wife rebranded their own business, DYLN Style Lounge, a salon and nail spa business located in Quezon City. The couple also opened a cat cafe called Litterbucks in 2020. They also owned a production company, BrightBurn Entertainment which allowed him to be hands-on in the creative process of filmmaking. Trillo served as CEO and his wife Jennylyn served as President. Brightburn Entertainment co-produced the movie, Green Bones which was an official entry to 2024 Metro Manila Film Festival.

The couple owned a rest house made of shipping containers which was converted it into a beautiful home for their family which is located in Tanay, Rizal. Currently, the couple is in the process of building their 3-storey dream house for their family.

== Philanthropy and activism ==
In 2024, Trillo donated his P100,000 MMFF Best Actor award (sponsored by Playtime PH) to persons deprived of liberty as requested by Jennylyn Mercado. Trillo's road manager Jan Enriquez handed the amount to Green Bones' content creator Joseph Conrad Rubio for the General Trias PDL's "Wish tree" facility. The GenTri jail's real Tree of Hope inspired Rubio to conceive the theme of the Metro Manila Film Festival Award for Best Picture,in memory of his late father Zaldy.

== Filmography ==
=== Selected filmography ===
Film

- Mano Po III: My Love (2004)
- Aishite Imasu 1941: Mahal Kita (2004)
- Mulawin: The Movie (2005)
- Blue Moon (2006)
- TxT (2006)
- Mag-ingat Ka Sa... Kulam (2008)
- I.T.A.L.Y. (2008)
- Tarot (2009)
- Astig (2009)
- Rosario (2010)
- My Neighbor's Wife (2011)
- Ang Katiwala (2012)
- Shake, Rattle and Roll Fourteen: The Invasion (2012)
- Sapi (2013)
- The Janitor (2014)
- You're Still the One (2015)
- Felix Manalo (2015)
- One Great Love (2018)
- On the Job: The Missing 8 (2021)
- Green Bones (2024)
- Everything About My Wife (2025)
- Amir (2026)

Television

- Tabing Ilog (1999-2000)
- Pangako Sa 'Yo (2000)
- Mulawin (2004-2005)
- Mars Ravelo's Darna (2005)
- Majika (2006)
- Super Twins (2007)
- Zaido: Pulis Pangkalawakan (2007-2008)
- Carlo J. Caparas: Gagambino (2008-2009)
- Adik Sa'Yo (2009)
- Jillian: Namamasko Po (2010-2011)
- Dwarfina (2011)
- Sinner or Saint (2011)
- Temptation of Wife (2012-2013)
- My Husband's Lover (2013)
- Cain at Abel (2018-2019)
- Legal Wives (2021)
- Maria Clara at Ibarra (2022)
- Love Before Sunrise (2023)
- Pulang Araw (2024)
- Sanggang-Dikit FR (2025-2026)
- Hari ng Tondo (2026)

== Discography ==
=== Albums ===
==== Studio albums ====
- Dennis Trillo (2007, IndiMusic)

==== Collaboration albums ====
- TomDen (with Tom Rodriguez) (2013, GMA Records) (PARI Certification: Platinum)

==== Compilation appearances ====
- Seasons of Love (2014, GMA Records)

Track 6: "Tibok ng Puso"

=== Singles ===
- "All About Love" (2007)
- "Lumilipad" (2007)
- "Hinahanap-Hanap Kita" (Adik Sa'Yo theme song) (2009)
- "Forever" (with Tom Rodriguez) (2014)
- "Kailan Man" (A 100-Year Legacy theme song) (2014)
- "Tibok ng Puso" (Sa Puso ni Dok theme song) (2014)
- "Sa Iyo na Lang Ako" (Hiram na Alaala theme song) (2014)
- "Overdrive" (Lakbay 2 Love theme song) (with Solenn Heussaff) (2016)

== Accolades ==
Trillo's accolades includes 30 total wins of 2x MMFF Best Actor Award, 1x MMFF Best Supporting Actor Award, 1x Asian TV Awards Best Actor Award, 1x FAMAS Best Actor Award, 1x LUNA Best Actor Award, 2x PMPC Movies Best Actor Award, 1x FAMAS Best Supporting Actor Award, 2x Golden Screen Movies Best Supporting Actor Award, 2x Golden Screen TV Best Actor Award and a Seoul International Drama Award. Dennis Trillo wins Best Actor at 2025 Gawad Urian.
