= Pulang Araw =

2024 Philippine television drama series

- Title card
- Also known as: In the Arms of the Conqueror; Crimson Invasion
- Genre: War drama
- Created by: Suzette Doctolero
- Written by: Suzette Doctolero; Onay Sales; Anna Aleta Nadela
- Directed by: Dominic Zapata
- Creative director: Aloy Adlawan
- Starring: Barbie Forteza; Sanya Lopez; David Licauco; Alden Richards; Dennis Trillo
- Theme music composer: Paulo Guico; Miguel Guico; Pablo Nase
- Opening theme: "Kapangyarihan" by Ben&Ben and SB19
- Country of origin: Philippines
- Original language: Tagalog
- No. of episodes: 110

Production
- Executive producer: Rosie Lyn M. Atienza
- Production locations: Manila; Quezon; Batangas; Laguna; Bulacan; Pampanga
- Cinematography: Roman Theodossis
- Editors: Benedict Lavastida; Robert Ryan Reyes; Vince Valenzuela
- Camera setup: Multiple-camera setup
- Running time: 18–42 minutes
- Production company: GMA Entertainment Group

Original release
- Network: GMA Network
- Release: July 29 – December 27, 2024

Pulang Araw (transl. red sun / international title: In the Arms of the Conqueror) is a 2024 Philippine television drama war series broadcast by GMA Network. Directed by Dominic Zapata, it stars Barbie Forteza, Sanya Lopez, David Licauco, Alden Richards and Dennis Trillo. It premiered on July 29, 2024, on the network's Prime line up. The series concluded on December 27, 2024, with a total of 110 episodes.

The series is streaming online on Netflix and YouTube.

== Premise ==
Eduardo, Adelina, Teresita, and Hiroshi navigate their respective lives amid the Japanese occupation of the Philippines.

== Cast and characters ==
Cast

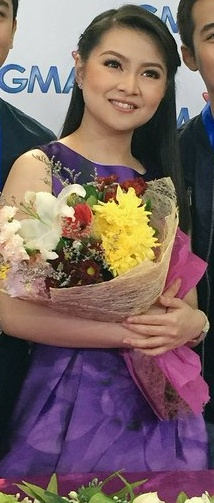
Barbie Forteza

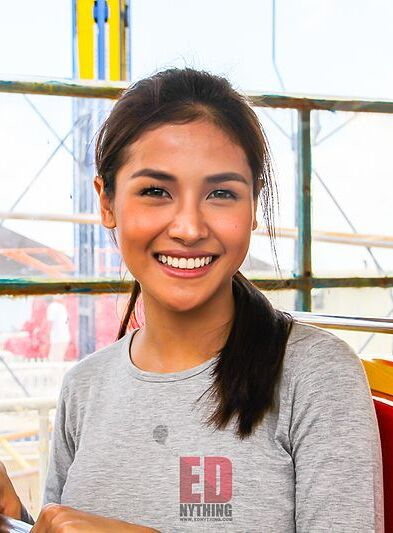
Sanya Lopez

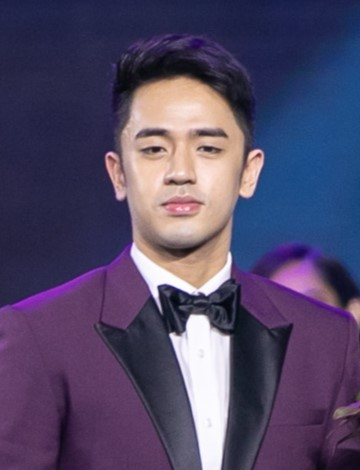
David Licauco

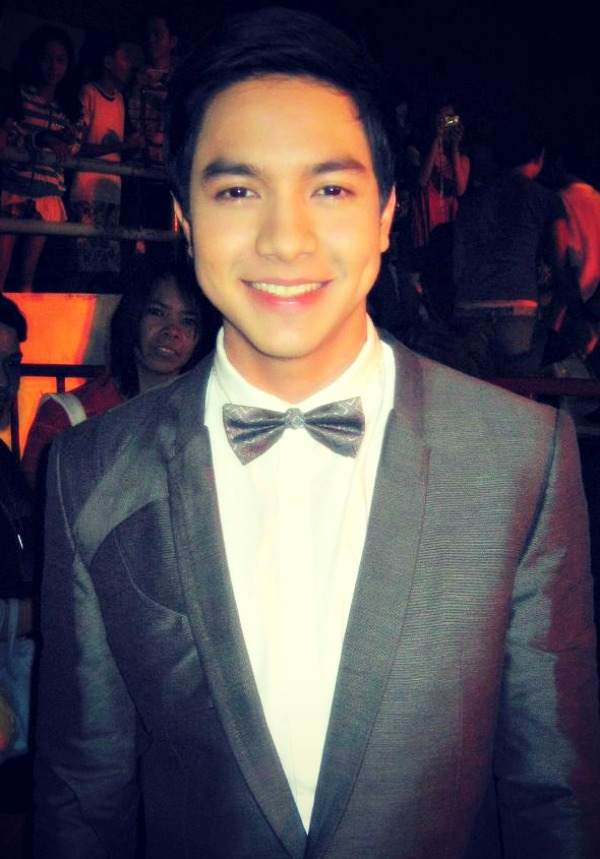
Alden Richards

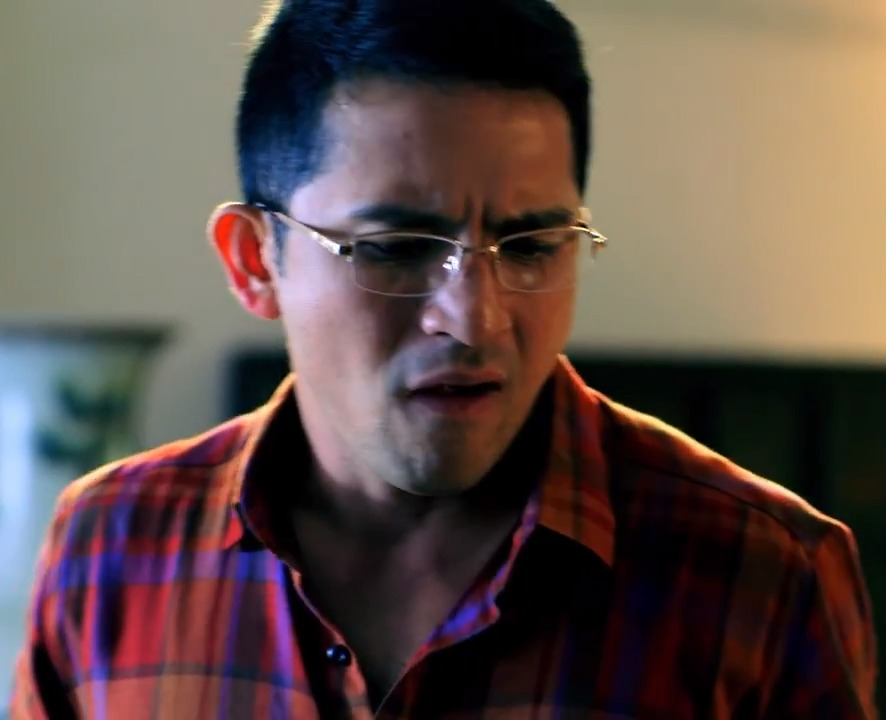
Dennis Trillo

Lead cast

- Barbie Forteza as Adelina "Chinita" dela Cruz:

Eduardo's younger sister, harbors a strong dislike for Americans. When World War II begins, she chooses to side with the Japanese.

- Sanya Lopez as Teresita "Morena" Borromeo:

Adelina's older half-sister, Teresita Borromeo, has aspirations of becoming a vaudeville star. She is the daughter of Carmela and Julio Borromeo.

- David Licauco as Hiroshi Tanaka:

The son of Japanese immigrants, he goes to Japan to study and eventually returns to the Philippines, where he reunites with his childhood friends Adelina, Teresita and Eduardo.

- Alden Richards as Eduardo dela Cruz:

Harbors resentment towards his American father, who rejected his mother. The older half-brother of Adelina and has romantic feelings for Teresita. Choosing to side with neither the Americans nor the Japanese, he joins the guerrilla forces.

- Dennis Trillo as Yuta Saitoh:

A Japanese Imperial Army officer whose mission is to conquer the Philippines, he eventually develops feelings for Teresita.

Supporting cast

- Epy Quizon as Julio Borromeo
- Angelu de Leon as Carmela Borromeo
- Ashley Ortega as Manuela Apolonio
- Rochelle Pangilinan as Amalia Dimalanta-Torres
- Mikoy Morales as Tasyo
- Brianna Advincula as Luisa
- Isay Alvarez as Dolores
- Jay Arcilla as Dado
- Don Melvin Boongaling as Juanito
- Sef Cadayona as Luis
- Skye Chua as Yuki
- Tyro Dylusan as Juan
- Joyce Glorioso as Rosing
- Karenina Haniel as Meding
- Issa Litton as Bettina
- Joanne Morallos as Yolanda
- Ryoichi Nagatsuka as Ryu
- Jay Ortega as Akio Watanabe
- Bombi Plata as Francisco
- Armson Panesa as Isko
- Angeli Nicole Sanoy as Lorena
- Robert Seña as Johnny
- Neil Ryan Sese as Lauro Torres
- Aidan Veneracion as Mario Santos
- Justin Lim as first lieutenant Yamada

Guest cast

- Rhian Ramos as Filipina "Fina" dela Cruz
- Jacky Woo as Chikara Tanaka
- Maria Ozawa as Haruka Tanaka
- Billy Ray Gallion as Tyler Campbell
- Franchesco Maafi as younger Eduardo dela Cruz
- Cassy Lavarias as younger Adelina dela Cruz
- Cheska Maranan as younger Teresita Borromeo
- Miguel Diokno as younger Hiroshi Tanaka
- Julie Anne San Jose as Katy de la Cruz
- Derrick Monasterio as Marcel
- Zephanie Dimaranan as Chichay
- Waynona Collings as Mary Walter
- Lauren King as Etang Discher
- Rabiya Mateo as Rosalia
- Abraham Lawyer as an American soldier
- Max Collins as Valeria "Yay" Panlilio
- Ronnie Liang as Marcos Villa "Marking" Agustin
- Elle Villanueva as Kumander Liwayway

== Development ==
Writer Suzette Doctolero began conceptualizing Pulang Araw between 2012 and 2013. In 2023, the series was announced, with Doctolero serving as the head writer.

Doctolero's interest in writing a story set during the Japanese occupation in the Philippines was a result of her grandparents' experience as guerrilla fighters and vaudeville performers. She researched and interviewed World War II veterans, vaudeville artists and comfort women for the series.

=== Casting ===
In November 2023, the cast of the series was announced. In December, Abraham Lawyer joined the cast. In July 2024, additional cast members Robert Seña, Neil Ryan Sese, Jay Arcilla, Sef Cadayona and Tyro Daylusan were announced. Julie Anne San Jose, Derrick Monasterio, Isay Alvarez, Rabiya Mateo, Jacky Woo, Maria Ozawa and Billy Ray Gallon were announced for a guest role.

== Production ==
Principal photography commenced on December 1, 2023. Filming took place in Manila, Quezon, Batangas, Laguna, Bulacan and Pampanga. Historical locations that were no longer existent were recreated using CGI. Several Japanese language coaches were hired to teach the cast, including cast member Ryoichi "Ryo" Nagatsuka, who is of Filipino-Japanese descent. Filming concluded on December 4, 2024.

== Music ==
"Kapangyarihan" (transl. power) by Ben&Ben and SB19 serves as the main title theme of Pulang Araw. The songs for the series were produced by Rocky Gacho, using the compositions from the time period the series is based on, notably of Shelton Brooks, Nicanor Abelardo, Brewster Higley and Daniel E. Kelley. A soundtrack album was released on August 9, 2024, by GMA Playlist, featuring songs performed by the series' cast.

== Release ==
The pilot episode of Pulang Araw premiered on Netflix on July 26, 2024, while its television debut on GMA Network was broadcast on July 29, 2024. Originally set to air 100 episodes, the series was ordered additional ten episodes in November 2024. The final episode of the series was released on Netflix on December 24, 2024, while its television broadcast on GMA Network aired on December 27, 2024.

== Reception ==
=== Ratings ===
According to AGB Nielsen Philippines' Nationwide Urban Television Audience Measurement People in Television Homes, the pilot episode of Pulang Araw earned a 12.8% rating.

=== Critical response ===
James Patrick Anarcon of PEP, complimented the series' cast and highlighted the performance of actress Rhian Ramos, stating the actress showed "depth" to the character she was portraying. Mikhail Lecaros of The Philippine Star Life, gave a positive note towards the series' production design, visuals, costume design and cast, and also criticized the series for its "tired telenovela tropes".

== Accolades ==
Accolades received by Pulang Araw
Year	Award	Category	Recipient	Result	Ref.
2024	Anak TV Seal Awards	Household Favorite Program	Pulang Araw	Won	
2024	Anak TV Seal Awards	Female Makabata TV Star	Barbie Forteza	Won	
2024	Anak TV Seal Awards	Male Makabata TV Star	Alden Richards	Won	
2024	Asian Academy Creative Awards	Best Promo or Trailer	Pulang Araw	Won	
2024	7th Gawad Lasallaneta Awards	Most Outstanding Teleserye	Pulang Araw	Won	
2024	Ima Wa Ima Asian International Film Festival and Entertainment Special Awards	Best Performance on a Featured Role	Rhian Ramos	Nominated	
2024	Movie and Television Review and Classification Board	Plaque of appreciation	Pulang Araw	Won	
2024	Venice TV Awards	Best Soap/Telenovela	Pulang Araw	Nominated	
2024	Tag Awards Chicago	Best Actress, Series	Barbie Forteza	Gold	
2024	Tag Awards Chicago	Best Actor, Series	Dennis Trillo	Silver	
2024	Tag Awards Chicago	Best Supporting Actress, Series	Sanya Lopez	Bronze	
2024	Tag Awards Chicago	Best Supporting Actor, Series	David Licauco	Gold	
2025	10th Platinum Stallion National Media Awards	Best Primetime Drama Series	Pulang Araw	Won	
2025	10th Platinum Stallion National Media Awards	Socially Relevant TV Series	Pulang Araw	Won	
2025	10th Platinum Stallion National Media Awards	Best Primetime Drama Series Actor	David Licauco	Won	
2025	10th Platinum Stallion National Media Awards	Best Primetime Drama Series Actress	Sanya Lopez	Won	
2025	10th Platinum Stallion National Media Awards	Best Primetime Supporting Actor	Epy Quizon	Won	
2025	10th Platinum Stallion National Media Awards	Best Primetime Supporting Actress	Rochelle Pangilinan	Won	
2025	38th PMPC Star Awards for Television	Best Child Performer	Cassy Lavarias	Nominated	
2025	38th PMPC Star Awards for Television	Best Child Performer	Brianna Advincula	Nominated	
2025	38th PMPC Star Awards for Television	Best Drama Actor	Alden Richards	Nominated	
2025	38th PMPC Star Awards for Television	Best Drama Actor	David Licauco	Nominated	
2025	38th PMPC Star Awards for Television	Best Drama Actress	Barbie Forteza	Nominated	
2025	38th PMPC Star Awards for Television	Best Drama Supporting Actor	Dennis Trillo	Won	
2025	38th PMPC Star Awards for Television	Best Drama Supporting Actress	Rochelle Pangilinan	Nominated	
2025	38th PMPC Star Awards for Television	Best New Male TV Personality	Jay Ortega	Nominated	
2025	38th PMPC Star Awards for Television	Best Primetime TV series	Pulang Araw	Nominated	
2025	6th ALTA Media Icon Awards	Best Actor for Television	Dennis Trillo	Won	
2025	6th ALTA Media Icon Awards	Most Promising Male Star	Jay Ortega	Won	

== Legacy ==
The series is set to be archived on the Lunar Codex located in Earth's Moon – an archive of works to be launched from Earth through NASA Artemis and Commercial Lunar Payload Services program partners.
