= Chris Martinez (director) =

Filipino filmmaker

- Occupations: Screenwriter; film director; producer; playwright

Christopher D. Martinez is a Filipino screenwriter, director, producer, and playwright. He is best known for writing the films Ang Babae sa Septic Tank (2011), the Kimmy Dora series, and Caregiver (2008), and directing 100 (2008), Here Comes the Bride (2010) and The Gifted (2014). A Palanca Award-winning playwright, Martinez has earned critical acclaim for his work in both theater and film.

His accolades include multiple awards from the Cinemalaya Independent Film Festival, a Golden Screen Award, and recognition from international festivals such as the Asian Film Awards, Marrakech International Film Festival, and the Udine Far East Film Festival, among others.

He is also the author of the book Laugh Trip.

== Early life and education ==
Martinez credited his exposure to a wide range of films from a young age to his father, who would take him to a local Betamax rental shop when he was younger to take home movies.

He studied business administration at the University of the Philippines Diliman before transitioning to a career in writing and film.

== Career ==
Before making his feature-length directorial debut, Martinez worked as a screenwriter. He wrote the screenplay for Bridal Shower (2004), an official entry to the 29th Metro Manila Film Festival, marking his first collaboration with director Jeffrey Jeturian. The following year, he re-teamed with Jeturian for Bikini Open (2005). In 2006, he contributed as a writer to the Chito S. Roño horror film Sukob.

In addition to his screenwriting work, Martinez directed the short film Bakas, an urban horror that won the Gawad CCP Award for Alternative Filmmaking.

He made his directorial debut in 2008 with the Cinemalaya drama film 100. The film received the Audience Award at the 4th Cinemalaya Film Festival, while Martinez won Best Director and Best Screenplay. The film was also screened at the Busan International Film Festival that year, where it won the Audience Award.

In 2012, Martinez wrote and directed the movie musical I Do Bidoo Bidoo: Heto nAPO Sila!, which features a selection of songs by the Apo Hiking Society. The film competed internationally at the 8th Osaka Asian Film Festival and the Far East Film Festival. Martinez received nominations for Movie Director of the Year and Movie Screenwriter of the Year at the 29th PMPC Star Awards for Movies.

In 2014, Martinez wrote the screenplay and directed the dark comedy film The Gifted, which screen both locally and abroad. The film was invited to participate in the 17th Far East Film Festival.

Martinez served as writer and director of the 2016 comedy, Working Beks. He described the film as presenting a more varied portrayal of gay characters, moving away from the stereotypical effeminate roles that were often used for humor in earlier Philippine cinema.

In 2024, he wrote the screenplay for Espantaho, directed by Roño, which was an official entry to the 50th Metro Manila Film Festival. The following year, Martinez co-wrote the screenplay for Jeturian's UnMarry with Therese Cayaba. The pair earned the Best Screenplay award at the 51st Metro Manila Film Festival.

== Influences ==
Martinez has acknowledged that he was inspired by director Wenn V. Deramas, particularly in crafting slapstick comedy. He stated that watching Deramas’ films taught him about timing and audience appeal, while also emphasizing that he has developed his own distinct style from the director. He has also cited Comedy Writing Secrets by Melvin Helitzer as an influence on his comedic approach, noting that it taught him that the most effective comedy is rooted in emotional pain.

Martinez has also mentioned Rene Villanueva as a mentor during his playwriting career.

== Style and themes ==
Martinez is known for approaching film primarily through comedy, both in his roles as a director and a screenwriter. He described himself as a comedy director, saying that there is always a point to his comedy. In an earlier interview, he said that he prefers working in comedy, though he has also expressed openness to directing a more “painful” film.

His work frequently employs farcical situations, satire, and exaggerated character dynamics. His work as a writer on Ang Babae sa Septic Tank pokes fun at conventions of independent filmmaking in the Philippines. For the sequel, Ang Babae sa Septic Tank 2, Martinez’s script has been described as having rhythm. Director Marlon Rivera, who collaborated with him on the film, credited Martinez’s writing for the humor and character antics, and noted that Martinez is strict about actors following the script. The film continues the series’ satirical approach to Philippine cinema, which has been described as poking fun at commercial and formulaic filmmaking and exploring the tension between commercial value and film quality.

Writing for the Philippine Daily Inquirer, Rito P. Asilo noted that Martinez delivers a briskly paced comedic tone in The Gifted (2014) that balances humor with cautionary drama while exploring themes of love, friendship, and ambition.

In an interview discussing Here Comes the Groom (2023), Martinez explained that his preproduction work places emphasis on casting choices, and said that the sequel was “more pointed toward the conversation on gender identity.” His 2025 film Kontrabida Academy, which he wrote and directed, has been described as a satirical comedy that pokes fun at recycled tropes of Filipino soap operas.

== Filmography ==
=== Film ===
Year	Title	Credited as			Notes
Year	Title	Director	Screenwriter	Producer	Notes
1995	Proboys	No	Yes	No	Story and screenplay
2004	Bridal Shower	No	Yes	No	Story and screenplay
2005	Bikini Open	No	Yes	No	Story and screenplay
2006	Sukob	No	Yes	No	
2008	Caregiver	No	Yes	No	Story and screenplay
2008	100	Yes	Yes	Executive	
2009	Kimmy Dora: Kambal sa Kiyeme	No	Yes	No	
2010	Here Comes the Bride	Yes	Yes	No	
2011	My Valentine Girls	Yes	No	No	Segment: "Gunaw"
2011	Cooking Mo, Cooking Ko	Yes	Yes	No	Short film
2011	The Howl & the Fussyket	Yes	Yes	No	Short film
2011	Joey Gosiengfiao's Temptation Island	Yes	Yes	No	
2011	The Woman in the Septic Tank	No	Yes	Executive	Creative Supervisor
2011	Shake, Rattle & Roll 13	Yes	Yes	No	"Segment: Rain, Rain, Go Away"
2012	Kimmy Dora and the Temple of Kiyeme	No	Yes	No	
2012	I Do Bidoo Bidoo: Heto nAPO Sila!	Yes	Yes	No	
2013	Instant Mommy	No	Story	Executive	
2013	Status: It's Complicated	Yes	Yes	No	
2013	Kimmy Dora: Ang Kiyemeng Prequel	Yes	Yes	No	Story and screenplay
2014	The Gifted	Yes	Yes	No	
2014	Beauty in a Bottle	No	Story	Creative	Creative Producer
2015	You're Still the One	Yes	No	No	
2016	Lumayo Ka Nga sa Akin	Yes	No	No	Segment: "Asawa ni Marie"
2016	Working Beks	Yes	Yes	No	
2016	Ang Babae sa Septic Tank 2: #ForeverIsNotEnough	No	Yes	Executive	
2017	Extra Service	Yes	No	No	
2017	Meant to Beh	Yes	No	No	Story and screenplay
2019	Ang Babae sa Septic Tank 3: The Real Untold Story of Josephine Bracken	No	Yes	No	Story and screenplay
2023	Here Comes the Groom	Yes	Yes	No	Standalone sequel
2024	Espantaho	No	Yes	No	
2025	Kontrabida Academy	Yes	Yes	No	

=== Television ===
Year	Title	Role	Notes	Ref.
2017	I Heart Davao	Head writer		
2018-2023	Daddy's Gurl	Director and head writer	Creator	
2019	Mga Batang Poz	Director	Web Miniseries	

== Theater ==
Year	Production	Venue	Notes	Ref.
2003	Temptation Island...Live!	Cultural Center of the Philippines		
2006	Welcome to Intelstar		Also writer	
2010	Welcome to Intelstar	CAP Art Center	Also writer	
2015	Kung Paano Ako Naging Leading Lady	PETA Theater Center		

== Works ==
=== Plays ===
- Last Order sa Penguin (2001)
- Welcome to Intelstar (2005)
- Laugh Trip: Dalawang Komedya (2006)
- Our Lady of Arlegui (2007)

=== Children's stories ===
- Ang Singsing-Pari sa Pisara (2014)

== Accolades ==
=== Films ===
Awards and nominations received by Chris Martinez
Awards and Nominations
Organization	Year	Nominated work	Category	Result	Ref.
Asian Film Awards	2012	Ang Babae sa Septic Tank	Best Screenwriter	Nominated	
Asia Pacific Screen Awards	2012	Ang Babae sa Septic Tank	Best Screenwriter	Nominated	
Busan International Film Festival	2008	100	New Currents Award	Nominated	
Busan International Film Festival	2008	100	Audience Award	Won	
Cinemalaya Independent Film Festival	2008	100	Best Film	Nominated	
Cinemalaya Independent Film Festival	2008	100	Best Screenplay	Won	
Cinemalaya Independent Film Festival	2008	100	Best Director	Won	
Cinemalaya Independent Film Festival	2008	100	Audience Choice	Won	
Cinemalaya Independent Film Festival	2011	Ang Babae sa Septic Tank	Best Screenplay - New Breed	Won	
FAMAS Awards	2009	Caregiver	Best Story (Note: Shared with Chito S. Roño, Jewel C. Castro.)	Nominated	
Gawad Urian Awards	2004	Bridal Shower	Best Screenplay (Pinakamahusay na Dulang Pampelikula)	Nominated	
Gawad Urian Awards	2012	Ang Babae sa Septic Tank	Best Screenplay (Pinakamahusay na Dulang Pampelikula)	Nominated	
Gawad TANGLAW	2012	Ang Babae sa Septic Tank	Best Screenplay	Won	
Golden Screen Awards	2009	100	Best Original Screenplay	Nominated	
Golden Screen Awards	2009	100	Best Director	Nominated	
Golden Screen Awards	2011	Here Comes the Bride	Best Story	Nominated	
Golden Screen Awards	2011	Here Comes the Bride	Best Original Screenplay	Nominated	
Golden Screen Awards	2011	Here Comes the Bride	Best Director	Nominated	
Golden Screen Awards	2012	Ang Babae sa Septic Tank	Best Story	Nominated	
Golden Screen Awards	2012	Ang Babae sa Septic Tank	Best Original Screenplay	Won	
Golden Screen Awards	2013	I Do Bidoo Bidoo: Heto nApo sila!	Best Story	Nominated	
Golden Screen Awards	2013	I Do Bidoo Bidoo: Heto nApo sila!	Best Original Screenplay	Nominated	
Golden Screen Awards	2013	I Do Bidoo Bidoo: Heto nApo sila!	Best Director	Nominated	
Luna Awards	2011	Caregiver	Best Screenplay	Nominated	
Luna Awards	2012	Ang Babae sa Septic Tank	Best Screenplay	Nominated	
Marrakech International Film Festival	2008	100	Golden Star	Nominated	
Metro Manila Film Festival	2011	Shake Rattle Roll 13	Best Director	Nominated	
Metro Manila Film Festival	2011	Shake Rattle Roll 13	Best Original Story (Note: Shared with Marlon Rivera.)	Won	
Metro Manila Film Festival	2013	Kimmy Dora: Ang Kiyemeng Prequel	Best Screenplay	Nominated	
Metro Manila Film Festival	2016	Ang Babae sa Septic Tank 2: #ForeverIsNotEnough	Best Screenplay	Nominated	
Metro Manila Film Festival	2024	Espantaho	Best Screenplay	Nominated	
Metro Manila Film Festival	2025	UnMarry	Best Screenplay	Won	
Osaka Asian Film Festival	2013	I Do Bidoo Bidoo: Heto nApo sila!	Grand Prix	Nominated	
PMPC Star Awards for Movies	2009	100	Digital Movie Original Screenplay of the Year	Nominated	
PMPC Star Awards for Movies	2009	Caregiver	Movie Original Screenplay of the Year	Nominated	
PMPC Star Awards for Movies	2009	100	Digital Movie Director of the Year	Nominated	
PMPC Star Awards for Movies	2010	Kimmy Dora: Kambal sa Kiyeme	Movie Original Screenplay of the Year	Nominated	
PMPC Star Awards for Movies	2011	Here Comes the Bride	Movie Original Screenplay of the Year	Nominated	
PMPC Star Awards for Movies	2011	Here Comes the Bride	Movie Director of the Year	Nominated	
PMPC Star Awards for Movies	2012	Ang Babae sa Septic Tank	Digital Movie Original Screenplay of the Year	Nominated	
PMPC Star Awards for Movies	2013	I Do Bidoo Bidoo: Heto nApo sila!	Movie Screenwriter of the Year	Nominated	
PMPC Star Awards for Movies	2013	I Do Bidoo Bidoo: Heto nApo sila!	Movie Director of the Year	Nominated	
PMPC Star Awards for Movies	2015	The Gifted	Movie Screenwriter of the Year	Nominated	
PMPC Star Awards for Movies	2015	The Gifted	Movie Director of the Year	Nominated	
Summer Metro Manila Film Festival	2023	Here Comes the Groom	Best Screenplay	Nominated	
Summer Metro Manila Film Festival	2023	Here Comes the Groom	Best Director	Nominated	
The EDDYS	2026	Kontrabida Academy	Best Screenplay	Nominated	
The EDDYS	2026	UnMarry	Best Screenplay	Nominated	
Udine Far East Film Festival	2011	Here Comes the Bride	Audience Award	Nominated	

=== Literary awards ===
Awards and nominations received by Chris Martinez
Organization	Year	Work / Nominee	Category	Result	Ref.
Don Carlos Palanca Memorial Awards for Literature	2001	"Last Order sa Penguin"	Dulang Ganap ang Haba (Full-Length Play)	First Prize	
Don Carlos Palanca Memorial Awards for Literature	2005	"Welcome to Intelstar"	One-Act Play	Third Prize	
Don Carlos Palanca Memorial Awards for Literature	2007	"Our Lady of Arlegui"	Dulaang May Isang Yugto (One-Act Play)	First Prize	
Don Carlos Palanca Memorial Awards for Literature	2013	"Ang Singsing-Pari sa Pisara"	Maikling Kwentong Pambata (Children's Short Story) (Note: Shared with Eugene Y. Evasco.)	Second Prize	

=== Honors and state recognition ===
Awards and nominations received by Chris Martinez
Organization	Year	Nominee/Work	Category	Result	Ref.
Indie Bravo! Awards	2012	Ang Babae sa Septic Tank	Scriptwriter	Honored	
