= 2011 Cinemalaya =

7th Cinemalaya Independent Film Festival
- Official poster
- Opening film: Maskara by Laurice Guillen
- Closing film: Rakenrol by Quark Henares; Zombadings 1 by Jade Castro
- Location: Metro Manila, Philippines
- Film titles: 23
- Festival date: July 15, 2011–July 24, 2011
- Website: Official Website

Cinemalaya chronology
- 2012 2010

The 7th Cinemalaya Independent Film Festival was held from July 15 until 24, 2011 in Metro Manila, Philippines.

The festival opened on July 15 and close on July 24, 2011, at the Main Theater of the Cultural Center of the Philippines.

The organizers have partnered with Ayala Malls allowing entrant films to be screened in select cinemas of the shopping mall chain starting this edition.

== Entries ==
The winning film is highlighted with boldface and a dagger.

=== Directors Showcase ===
The following films contending for 2011 Directors Showcase. The Directors' Showcase sidebar is for directors who had presented commercially released films in their career.

Title	Director	Cast
**Bisperas** ^{†}	Jeffrey Jeturian	Julia Clarete, Tirso Cruz III, Raquel Villavicencio
Busong	Auraeus Solito	Alessandra de Rossi
Isda	Adolfo Alix, Jr.	Cherry Pie Picache, Bembol Roco, Anita Linda
Patikul	Joel Lamangan	Marvin Agustin, Allen Dizon, Glaiza de Castro

=== New Breed ===
The following films contending for 2011 New Breed category. The New Breed section is for young and new talented filmmakers who will present their first feature film or directors who haven't presented commercially released films in their career.

Title	Director	Cast
Amok	Lawrence Fajardo	Mark Gil, Noni Buencamino, Gary Lim
**Ang Babae sa Septic Tank** ^{†}	Marlon Rivera	Eugene Domingo, JM De Guzman, Kean Cipriano, Cai Cortez
Baby Factory	Eduardo Roy Jr.	Diana Zubiri, Sue Prado, Susan Africa
Cuchera	Joseph Israel Laban	Maria Isabel Lopez, Simon Ibarra, CJ Ramos
I-Libings	Rommel Sales	Glaiza de Castro, Rez Cortez, Louella de Cordova
Ligo na Ü, Lapit na Me	Erick C. Salud	Edgar Allan Guzman, Mercedes Cabral
Niño	Loy Arcenas	Fides Cuyugan-Asensio, Shamaine Buencamino, Tony Mabesa, Art Acuña, Raquel Villavicencio
Ang Sayaw ng Dalawang Kaliwang Paa	Alvin Yapan	Jean Garcia, Paulo Avelino, Rocco Nacino
Teoriya	Zurich Chan	Alfred Vargas

=== Short films ===
Title	Director
Debut	Pamela Reyes
Un Diutay Mundo	Ana Lim
Every Other Time	Gino M. Santos
Hanapbuhay	Henry Frejas
Hazard	Mikhail Red
Immanuel	Gio Puyat
Niño Bonito	Rommel Tolentino
Oliver's Apartment	Misha Balangue
Samarito	Rafa Santos
**Walang Katapusang Kwarto** ^{†}	Emerson Reyes

== Awards ==
=== Full-Length Features ===
Directors Showcase

- Best Film - Bisperas by Jeffrey Jeturian
  - Audience Award - Patikul by Joel Lamangan
- Best Direction - Auraeus Solito for Busong
- Best Actor - Bembol Roco for Isda
- Best Actress - Raquel Villavicencio for Bisperas
- Best Supporting Actor - Jim Pebanco for Patikul
- Best Supporting Actress - Julia Clarete for Bisperas
- Best Cinematography - Boy Yniguez for Bisperas
- Best Editing - Benjamin Gonzales Tolentino for Isda
- Best Sound - Diwa de Leon for Busong
- Best Original Music Score - Diwa de Leon for Busong
- Best Production Design - Digo Ricio for Bisperas

New Breed

- Best Film - Ang Babae sa Septic Tank by Marlon Rivera
  - Special Jury Prize - Niño by Loy Arcenas
  - Audience Award - Ang Babae sa Septic Tank by Marlon Rivera
- Best Direction - Marlon Rivera for Ang Babae sa Septic Tank
- Best Actor - Edgar Allan Guzman for Ligo na Ü, Lapit na Me
- Best Actress - Eugene Domingo for Ang Babae sa Septic Tank
- Best Supporting Actor - Arthur Acuña for Niño
- Best Supporting Actress - Shamaine Buencamino for Niño
- Best Screenplay - Chris Martinez for Ang Babae sa Septic Tank
- Best Cinematography - Arvin Viola for Ang Sayaw ng Dalawang Kaliwang Paa
- Best Editing - Lawrence Fajardo for Amok
- Best Sound - Albert Michael Idioma for Amok
- Best Original Music Score - Christine Muyco, Jema Pamintuan for Ang Sayaw ng Dalawang Kaliwang Paa
- Best Production Design - Laida Lim for Niño

Special Awards

- NETPAC Award - Boundary by Benito Bautista
- National Council for Children's Television Award - Patikul by Joel Lamangan

=== Short films ===
- Best Short Film - Walang Katapusang Kwarto by Emerson Reyes
  - Special Jury Prize - Hanapbuhay by Henry Frejas
  - Audience Award - Walang Katapusang Kwarto by Emerson Reyes
- Best Direction - Rommel Tolentino for Niño Bonito
- Best Screenplay - Emerson Reyes for Walang Katapusang Kwarto
