= Ligo Na Ü, Lapit Na Me =

2011 film by Erick C. Salud

Ligo na Ü, Lapit na Me
- Official poster
- Directed by: Erick C. Salud
- Screenplay by: Jerry B. Gracio
- Based on: Ligo na Ü, Lapit na Me by Eros S. Atalia
- Produced by: Noel D. Ferrer
- Starring: Edgar Allan Guzman; Mercedes Cabral
- Cinematography: Alfred F. Hernando
- Edited by: Charliebebs Gohetia
- Music by: Monet Silvestre
- Production companies: Cinemalaya; Noel Ferrer Productions
- Distributed by: Regal Films
- Release dates: July 18, 2011 (Cinemalaya); September 28, 2011 (Philippines)
- Running time: 85 minutes
- Country: Philippines
- Language: Filipino
- Budget: ₱1.5−1.8 million

Ligo na Ü, Lapit na Me (English title: Star-Crossed Love; lit. 'Take a Shower Now; I'm Almost There') is a 2011 Philippine romantic-sex comedy film based on Eros S. Atalia's 2009 novel of the same name. The film was directed by Erick C. Salud (in his feature-length directorial debut) and its adapted screenplay was written by Jerry B. Gracio. The storyline revolves on a casual sexual relationship between two college students, Intoy (Edgar Allan Guzman) and his classmate Jenny (Mercedes Cabral).

As an independent production, the film was an official entry to the 7th Cinemalaya Independent Film Festival where it was nominated for Best Film, while Edgar Allan Guzman was awarded Best Actor.

== Plot ==
Karl Vladimir Lennon J. Villalobos, nicknamed "Intoy", is in his third year in state university when he meets Jenny, an attractive and affluent transferee from a private university. Despite being popular among the male students, Jenny chooses to befriend Intoy, much to his astonishment and confusion as he does not consider himself attractive. When Jenny asks Intoy about his sex life, he confesses his virginity. Jenny then seduces Intoy, to which he reluctantly acquiesces. They head to a motel where they shower together and have sex.

Jenny and Intoy begin spending time together often, which makes their classmates suspect that they are a couple; Intoy vehemently denies this. In reality, Intoy and Jenny are "friends with benefits": they go on dates and have sex without any romantic affections. This agreement goes on until their senior year. They eventually get to know each other better through their dates and pillow talks.

One day, Jenny decides to end Intoy's "benefits", which he seemingly accepts without any questions much to her surprise and exasperation. Intoy secretly refuses to accept Jenny's condition but nonetheless he pretends to concede; he has already developed feelings for Jenny and he fears that she will leave him if she finds out.

After a week of ignoring each other, Jenny unexpectedly approaches Intoy and reinstates his "benefits". They resume their original agreement until Jenny becomes mysteriously moody, and Intoy vainly tries to console her. As Intoy is about to profess his love, Jenny tells him the truth: she is pregnant, but assures Intoy that he is not the baby's father. Jenny then cuts all contact after that day. After Jenny's disappearance, Intoy contemplates their relationship and regrets not professing his love earlier.

As a graduation present, Intoy receives ₱3,000 from his parents. He decides to spend all the money on a prostitute, a trans woman hostess, and plenty of beer: all in a futile attempt to forget about Jenny. Intoy eventually graduates and prepares to look for a job. He slowly begins to move on with his life and accept the fact that he will never see Jenny again.

== Cast ==
- Edgar Allan Guzman as Karl Vladimir Lennon "Intoy" J. Villalobos
- Mercedes Cabral as Jennifer "Jenny" Evangelista

- Mel Kimura as Intoy's mother
- Simon Ibarra as Intoy's father
- Tolyts "Shalala" Reyes as Bugaw (lit. 'pimp')
- Evelyn Vargas as Ms. Physics
- Beverly Salviejo as Ms. Literary criticism
- Mhalouh Crisologo as Ms. Ethics
- Jojo Saguin as Joy
- Joseph Bitangcol as Classmate #1
- Lucky Mercado as Classmate #2
- Joe Vargas as Classmate #3
- Christian Tan as Classmate #4
- Ian Lazibal as Classmate #5
- Alex Tiglao as Mr. Political science
- Ardie Bascara as Jenny's ex–boyfriend
- Victor Medina as Benson
- Julie Anne Castro as Venus
- Luis Alandy as taxi driver
- Kiki Baento as floor manager

== Production ==
The film is based on the 2009 bestselling novel Ligo na Ü, Lapit na Me by Eros S. Atalia, a Palanca awardee and professor of Filipino language at the University of Santo Tomas. Producer Noel Ferrer and screenwriter Jerry Gracio (also a Palanca awardee) approached Atalia and declared their intention to option the rights for his book. Atalia agreed and cooperated with Gracio and the production crew to help keep the film loyal to its source material. Cinemalaya was initially reluctant to produce the film since the source novel had a nonlinear narrative; this required Gracio to fix the screenplay's timeline. The novel also contained a lot of commentary by the protagonist, which Gracio adapted into voice-over. In a 2011 interview for the Philippine Daily Inquirer, director Erick Salud claimed to have followed the book to the letter, with only a few updated lines by Gracio.

Though he has been in television production for around twenty years, this was the first feature film by director Erick Salud. This allowed the film to compete in Cinemalaya's New Breed category, which is exclusive for newbie directors; they were also entitled to Cinemalaya's ₱500,000 grant. Around ₱1.5 million to ₱1.8 million was spent on the film's production.

Lovi Poe, Kaye Abad, Pauleen Luna, and Danielle Castaño were all considered for the role of Jenny. However, it was Mercedes Cabral (the third choice) who landed the role as she was willing to do the risqué scenes.

Prior to principal photography, Edgar Allan Guzman sustained third-degree burns on his right hand after a go-kart racing accident. This required the reshoot of some scenes.

== Release ==
Ligo na Ü, Lapit na Me premiered at the 7th Cinemalaya Independent Film Festival held on July 15 to 24, 2011. Prominent film producer Lily Monteverde was impressed by the film after seeing it at Cinemalaya, and offered to purchase its distribution rights and release it commercially under her Regal Films.

After Cinemalaya, special screenings were held at the UP Film Institute, University of the Philippines Los Baños, and De La Salle University.

Ligo na Ü, Lapit na Me was commercially released on September 28, 2011, by Regal Films. Around 25 to 30 cinemas screened the film, mostly in Metro Manila.

The film was later screened at the Hawaii International Film Festival in October 2011.

== Reception ==
=== Box office ===
In his column for the Philippine Daily Inquirer, film director Jose Javier Reyes reported that the film—along with Ang Babae sa Septic Tank—were "favorites" in the 7th Cinemalaya, with 90% attendance in most screenings, becoming "neck-and-neck top-grossing contenders". In an interview a few hours after the Cinemalaya awards night, Edgar Allan Guzman claimed they were the second highest-grossing film of the festival. Ang Babae sa Septic Tank director Marlon Rivera confirmed that his film, and Ligo na Ü, Lapit na Me were the two highest-grossing films of the 7th Cinemalaya.

=== Critical response ===
Glenn Atanacio of the Philippine Entertainment Portal wrote that the film "will keep your senses alive for weeks, and get you daydreaming about those good ole college days". He also stated that Cabral's acting talents were "sorely underutilized" while Guzman needed to rehearse his delivery of jokes. Ibarra C. Mateo of GMA News praised the film's direction, script, and cinematography. He wrote: "Ligo na Ü, Lapit na Me summarizes in 85 minutes the various facets of the sexual, emotional, and psychological status of today's adolescents".

The Cinema Evaluation Board gave the film a "B" rating, and praised Guzman and Cabral's performances, as well as director Erick Salud for "capturing well the angst and foibles of post-modern love on our campuses today".

=== Accolades ===
Awards
Award / Film festival	Category	Recipient(s)	Outcome	Ref(s)
7th Cinemalaya Independent Film Festival (2011)	Best Film (New Breed Full Length Feature)		Nominated	
7th Cinemalaya Independent Film Festival (2011)	Best Actor (New Breed Full Length Feature)	Edgar Allan Guzman	Won	
10th Gawad TANGLAW Awards (2012)	Best Film		Nominated	
10th Gawad TANGLAW Awards (2012)	Best Director	Erick C. Salud	Nominated	
10th Gawad TANGLAW Awards (2012)	Best Actor	Edgar Allan Guzman	Nominated	
9th Golden Screen Awards (2012)	Best Motion Picture-Musical or Comedy		Nominated	
9th Golden Screen Awards (2012)	Best Director	Erick C. Salud	Nominated	
9th Golden Screen Awards (2012)	Best Performance by an Actor in a Leading Role-Musical or Comedy	Edgar Allan Guzman (Note: Tied with Martin Escudero of Zombadings 1: Patayin sa Shokot si Remington.)	Won	
9th Golden Screen Awards (2012)	Best Performance by an Actress in a Leading Role-Musical or Comedy	Mercedes Cabral	Nominated	
9th Golden Screen Awards (2012)	Best Screenplay Adaptation	Jerry B. Gracio	Won	
9th Golden Screen Awards (2012)	Best Original Song	"Sa Muling Pagtatagpo" – Music & Lyrics: Jude Gitamondoc • Performance: Daryl Leong	Won	
9th Golden Screen Awards (2012)	Best Editing	Charliebebs Gohetia	Nominated	

== Planned sequel ==
During the film's special screening for the Inquirer Film Club, producer Noel Ferrer announced that a sequel will be produced. It will be based on Eros S. Atalia's novel It's Not That Complicated: Bakit Hindi pa Sasakupin ng mga Alien ang Daigdig sa 2012 published in May 2012.

== See also ==
- Cinemalaya Philippine Independent Film Festival
- 7th Cinemalaya Independent Film Festival
