= Minsan may isang puta =

Minsan may Isang Puta (short story)
- Author: Mike Portes
- Language: Filipino
- Genre: Fictional biographies
- Published: April 30, 2004, Peyups.com; December, 2011 Mismo Magazine (U.A.E.); July 16, 2012, The Dove Files; Nov 22, 2014, Minsan may Isang Puta at Iba pa

Minsan may Isang Puta is an allegory in Filipino, written by Ms. Mike Portes in 2004 and was modified in 2007.

== Summary ==
A woman bares her soul to her listener. As she shares her pain and unravels herself, she becomes more than the perceived prostitute but a survivor and a mother who is both familiar and forgotten.

"...a short piece that uses a first-person narrative technique that speaks directly to its reader. The voice is even pedestrian that in its familiar tone the reader is simply drawn to it. The voice simply asks that you listen as if an old friend or relative is about to tell a story. It is a story that found thousands of listening ears since it first appeared in 2004. The story is at once familiar yet enigmatic. In “re-telling the truth through the words of a loving mother and by using sex as an impulse zone” is perhaps what makes it fresh, intimate and endearing." ("When Doves Cry", October 22, 2012)

== Film Adaptation and Reception ==
Minsan may Isang Puta won a film grant in 2010 in the multi-narrative indie film: "Ganap na Babae" (International title: Garden of Eve).

Ms. Mercedes Cabral in her role in the screenplay of "Minsan may Isang Puta" was praised by local media. The movie was shown at the Cultural Center of the Philippines more than twice, at the U.P. Diliman Film Center and U.P. Los Baños, at the National Commission for Culture and the Arts (NCCA), at Salt Lake City, Utah and to a sold out New York screening, where it bagged a SoHo International Film Festival NYC Award. The film was honored as Cinemalaya 2010's opening and closing film and has won other international and local recognition including the Harvest of Honor (Ani ng Dangal) award conferred by the National Commission for Culture and the Arts (NCCA) under the Office of the President of the Philippines.

"Minsan may Isang Puta" became popular in social media in 2012 with over 40,000 likes and shares and has been consistently Definitely Filipino's Popular All Time article that inspired creative amateur productions in Filipino and Theater subjects in High Schools and Universities over the years.

== Publications ==
The royalties from the author's sole-authored books, “The Dove Files” and "Minsan may Isang Puta at Iba Pa" paperbacks at Barnes and Noble Online, went to two "Project Malasakit scholars". A Typhoon Yolanda survivor who graduated cum laude from the University of the Philippines Visayas in June 2019 and passed the CPA licensure exam. and the daughter of a late cancer victim who graduated cum laude in April 2013, the rest was paid forward to baby Mark who underwent a liver transplant in March 2013.
