= 2010 Cinemalaya =

6th Cinemalaya Independent Film Festival
- Official poster
- Opening film: Ganap na Babae by Rica Arevalo, Ellen Ramos & Sarah Roxas
- Location: Metro Manila, Philippines
- Film titles: 24
- Festival date: July 9–18, 2010
- Website: Official Website

Cinemalaya chronology
- 2011 2009

The 6th Cinemalaya Independent Film Festival was held from July 9 to 18, 2010 at the Cultural Center of the Philippines Complex in Metro Manila, Philippines.

== Overview ==
The 6th Cinemalaya Independent Film Festival and Competition held in Metro Manila was hosted jointly by Cinemalaya Foundation, Cultural Center of the Philippines (CCP), Film Development Council of the Philippines (FDCP) and Econolink Investments. The film entries were categorized as full-length feature and short films.

The 2010 edition saw the introduction of the Director's Showcase competition which was open to veteran filmmakers. The main competition was rebranded as the New Breed competition.

The prize money and awards included ₱200,000 and the Balanghai Trophy for the outstanding full feature film and ₱100,000 and a Balanghai Trophy for the best short film. The best director category carried a purse of ₱300,000 and the Balanghai Trophy.

Films directed by big names like Mario O"Hara's Ang Paglilitis ni Bonifacio, Mark Meily's Donor, Joselito Altarejos's Pink Halo-Halo, Joel Lamangan's Sigwa and Gil Portes's Two Funerals participated in the festival. Films by Filipino directors having directed three full-length commercial feature films also took part as strong contenders.

== Entries ==
The winning film is highlighted with boldface and a dagger.

=== Directors Showcase ===
The following films contending for 2010 Directors Showcase. The Directors' Showcase sidebar is for directors who had presented commercially released films in their career.

Title	Director	Cast
**Donor** ^{†}	Mark Meily	Baron Geisler, Meryll Soriano
Ang Paglilitis ni Andres Bonifacio	Mario O'Hara	Alfred Vargas
Pink Halo-Halo	Joselito Altarejos	Angeli Bayani, Allen Dizon
Two Funerals	Gil Portes	Tessie Tomas, Robert Arevalo, Princess Manzon, Xian Lim
Sigwa	Joel Lamangan	Marvin Agustin, Gina Alajar, Tirso Cruz III, Zsa Zsa Padilla

=== New Breed ===
The following films contending for 2010 New Breed category. The New Breed section is for young and new talented filmmakers who will present their first feature film or directors who haven't presented commercially released films in their career.

Title	Director	Cast
**Halaw** ^{†}	Sheron Dayoc	John Arcilla, Maria Isabel Lopez
The Leaving	Ian Loreños	Acey Aguilar, Margery Lao
Limbunan	Gutierrez Mangansakan II	Tetchie Agbayani, Joem Bascon
Magkakapatid	Kim Garcia	Archie Adamos
Mayohan	Dan Villegas	Lovi Poe
Rekrut	Danny Añonuevo	Archie Adamos, Acey Aguilar, Rich Asuncion
Sampaguita, National Flower	Francis Pasion	Marlon Abalos
Si Techie, Si Teknoboy at Si Juana B	Art Katipunan	Danilo Barrios, Mercedes Cabral, Rizza Calderon
Vox Populi	Dennis Marasigan	Irma Adlawan, Ces Aldaba, Bobby Andrews

=== Short films ===
Title	Director
Boca	Zurich Chan
Breakfast With Lolo	Steven Flor
Dalaw	Janus Victoria
Despedida	Borgy Torre
Faculty	Jerrold Tarog
Hay Pinhod Oh Ya Scooter	Hubert Tibi
Harang	Mikhail Red
Lola	Joey Agbayani
P	Rommel Tolentino
**Wag Kang Titingin** ^{†}	Pamela Miras

== Awards ==
=== Full-Length Features ===
Directors Showcase

- Best Film - Donor by Mark Meily
  - Special Jury Prize - Two Funerals by Gil Portes
  - Audience Award - Two Funerals by Gil Portes
- Best Direction - Gil Portes for Two Funerals
- Best Actor - Baron Geisler for Donor
- Best Actress - Meryll Soriano for Donor
- Best Supporting Actor - Tirso Cruz III for Sigwa
- Best Supporting Actress - Karla Pambid for Donor
- Best Screenplay - Enrique Ramos for Two Funerals
- Best Cinematography - Arvin Viola for Two Funerals
- Best Editing - Chuck Gutierrez for Pink Halo-Halo
- Best Production Design - Aped Santos for Donor

New Breed

- Best Film - Halaw by Sheron Dayoc
  - Special Jury Prize - Sampaguita, National Flower by Francis Xavier Pasion
  - Audience Award - Magkakapatid by Kim Garcia
- Best Direction - Sheron Dayoc for Halaw
- Best Actor - John Arcilla for Halaw
- Best Actress - Lovi Poe for Mayohan
- Best Supporting Actor - Emilio Garcia for Rekrut
- Best Supporting Actress - LJ Reyes for The Leaving
- Best Screenplay - Paul Sta. Ana for Mayohan
- Best Cinematography - Dan Villegas for Mayohan and Rommel Sales for The Leaving
- Best Editing - Chuck Gutierrez, Lester Olayer for Halaw
- Best Sound - Albert Michael Idioma for Rekrut
- Best Original Music Score - Emerzon Texon for Mayohan

Special Award

- NETPAC Award - Sheika by Arnel Mardoquio

=== Short films ===
- Best Short Film - Wag Kang Titingin by Pamela Miras
  - Special Jury Prize - P by Rommel Tolentino
  - Audience Award - P by Rommel Tolentino
- Best Direction - Rommel Tolentino for P
- Best Screenplay - Mikhail Red for The Barriers
