= 2012 Cinemalaya =

8th Cinemalaya Independent Film Festival
- Official poster
- Opening film: Babae sa Breakwater by Mario O'Hara
- Closing film: Jack and Jill by Mar S. Torres
- Location: Metro Manila, Philippines
- Film titles: 25
- Festival date: July 20, 2012–July 29, 2012
- Website: Official Website

Cinemalaya chronology
- 2013 2011

The 8th Cinemalaya Independent Film Festival was held from July 20 until 29, 2012 in Metro Manila, Philippines.

The awards night was held at the Tanghalang Nicanor Abelardo (Main Theater) of the Cultural Center of the Philippines.

== Entries ==
The fifteen feature-film entries are divided into two separate competitions. The five feature-film entries will compete under the Directors Showcase which are presented by veteran film directors of the country. While the other ten feature-film entries will compete under the New Breed section which are presented by first-time or young filmmakers working today. The Short Film section has also ten competing entries. The winning film is highlighted with boldface and a dagger.

=== Directors Showcase ===
Title	Director	Cast	Genre
Bwakaw	Jun Lana	Eddie Garcia, Princess, Rez Cortez, Joey Paras, and Soliman Cruz	Drama, Comedy
Kalayaan	Adolfo Alix, Jr.	Ananda Everingham, Zanjoe Marudo, Luis Alandy	Experimental, Drama
Kamera Obskura	Raymond Red	Pen Medina, Joel Torre, Nanding Josef	Drama
Mga Mumunting Lihim	Jose Javier Reyes	Judy Ann Santos, Iza Calzado, Agot Isidro, Janice de Belen	Drama
**Posas** ^{†}	Lawrence Fajardo	Nico Antonio, Bangs Garcia, Wendy Valdez, and Art Acuña	Drama

=== New Breed ===
Title	Director	Cast	Genre
The Animals	Gino M. Santos	Albie Casiño, Patrick Sugui, Dawn Balagot	Teen drama
Aparisyon	Isabel Sandoval (credited as Vincent Sandoval)	Jodi Sta. Maria, Mylene Dizon, Fides Cuyugan-Asensio, Raquel Villavicencio	Psychological drama, Thriller
Mga Dayo	Julius Sotomayor Cena	Olga Natividad, Sue Prado, and Janela Buhain	Drama
**Diablo** ^{†}	Mes de Guzman	Ama Quiambao, and Carlo Aquino	Drama
Intoy Shokoy ng Kalye Marino	Lemuel Lorca	JM De Guzman, Joross Gamboa, LJ Reyes	Drama
Ang Katiwala	Aloy Adlawan	Dennis Trillo	Drama
Ang Nawawala	Marie Jamora	Dominic Roco, Dawn Zulueta, Felix Roco	Drama, Romance
Oros	Paul Sta. Ana	Tanya Gomez, Kristoffer King, Kristofer Martin	Drama
REquieme!	Loy Arcenas	Shamaine Buencamino, Rez Cortez, Anthony Falcon	Black comedy
Sta. Niña	Manny Palo	Coco Martin, Alessandra de Rossi, Angel Aquino	Drama

=== Short films ===
Title	Director
Balintuná	Emmanuel J. Escalona Jr.
Bohe: Sons of the Waves	Nadjoua Bansil
Manenaya	Richard Legaspi
Mientras su Durmida	Sheron Dayoc
Ang Paghihintay sa Bulong	Sigrid Andrea Bernardo
Pasahero	Max Celada
Ruweda	Hannah Espia
Sarong Adlaw	Jun Dio
Ulian	Chuck Gutierrez
**Victor** ^{†}	Jarell Serencio

== Awards ==
=== Full-Length Features ===
Directors Showcase

- Best Film - Posas by Lawrence Fajardo
  - Special Jury Prize - Kamera Obskura by Raymond Red
  - Audience Award - Bwakaw by Jun Lana
- Best Direction - Raymond Red for Kamera Obskura
- Best Actor - Eddie Garcia for Bwakaw
- Best Actress / Supporting Actress - Judy Ann Santos, Iza Calzado, Agot Isidro and Janice de Belen for Mga Mumunting Lihim
- Best Supporting Actor - Arthur Acuña for Posas
- Best Screenplay - Jose Javier Reyes for Mga Mumunting Lihim
- Best Cinematography - Albert Banzon for Kalayaan
- Best Editing - Vanessa De Leon for Mga Mumunting Lihim
- Best Sound - Ditoy Aguila for Kalayaan
- Best Original Music Score - Diwa de Leon for Kamera Obskura
- Best Production Design - Adolfo Alix Jr. for Kalayaan

New Breed

- Best Film - Diablo by Mes de Guzman
  - Special Jury Prize - REquieme! by Loy Arcenas
  - Audience Award - Ang Nawawala by Marie Jamora
- Best Direction - Mes de Guzman for Diablo
- Best Actor - Kristoffer King for Oros
- Best Actress - Ama Quiambao for Diablo
- Best Supporting Actor - Joross Gamboa for Intoy Siyokoy ng Kalye Marino
- Best Supporting Actress - Anita Linda for Sta. Niña
- Best Screenplay - Rody Vera for REquieme!
- Best Cinematography - Tristan Salas for Diablo
- Best Editing - Rona Delos Reyes, John Anthony L. Wong for The Animals
- Best Sound - Albert Michael Idioma for Aparisyon
- Best Original Music Score - Mikey Amistoso, Diego Mapa, Jazz Nicholas for Ang Nawawala
- Best Production Design - Ben Payumo for Intoy Siyokoy ng Kalye Marino

Special Awards

- NETPAC Award
  - Directors Showcase - Bwakaw by Jun Lana
  - New Breed - Diablo by Mes de Guzman

=== Short films ===
- Best Short Film - Victor by Jarell Serencio
  - Special Jury Prize - Manenaya by Richard Legaspi
  - Audience Award - Ruweda by Hannah Espia
- Best Direction - Sheron Dayoc for Mientras su Durmida
- Best Screenplay - Sigrid Andrea Bernardo for Ang Paghihintay sa Bulong
