= Kontrabida Academy =

2025 Filipino comedy drama film

- Official movie poster
- Directed by: Chris Martinez
- Written by: Chris Martinez
- Starring: Barbie Forteza; Eugene Domingo
- Distributed by: Netflix
- Release date: September 11, 2025
- Running time: 108 minutes
- Country: Philippines
- Language: Tagalog

Kontrabida Academy (translated: Villain Academy) is a 2025 Philippine comedy film written and directed by Chris Martinez. The film stars Barbie Forteza and Eugene Domingo in a story about a woman who enters a school designed to train villains. The film was released globally on the streaming platform Netflix on September 11, 2025. Critics have described the film as a campy homage to Philippine soap operas.

== Plot ==
Gigi is a frustrated woman working as the assistant manager of a Korean barbecue restaurant, where she is treated poorly by her superior, Jingo. Gigi also struggles with debt caused by her mother, Betty, in her pursuit of luxury goods that turn out to be fake, and discovers that her boyfriend of seven years, Abet, is cheating on her.

Gigi wins a television set in a raffle and begins watching a soap opera titled Batas ng Api (transl. Law of the Oppressed), a Cinderella-like story featuring a villainous stepmother named Mauricia who torments the protagonist Mirinisa with the help of Mauricia's daughter Mimi. After Mimi dies from an accidental poisoning in the series, Mauricia breaks the fourth wall and speaks to Gigi over the screen, inviting her to enroll in the "Kontrabida Academy" to learn how to fight back against those who mistreat her. Mauricia promises that the curriculum will help Gigi reach her full potential.

At the academy, Gigi attends classes taught by various villains. Upon graduating, Gigi adopts a new, confident persona named Gia, and returns to the real world to confront her problems using the skills she learned. She engineers a coup to replace Jingo as manager after discovering that he had been embezzling the restaurant's profits at the expense of its working and logistical conditions, forces Betty to admit that she had also been embezzling her husband's remittances from being a migrant worker, and reveals to Abet that her new girlfriend, Peachy, underwent extensive plastic surgery and reveals photos of her previously hideous appearance.

Gia is introduced by Mauricia as her long-lost daughter in Batas ng Api, but finds herself reluctant to oppress the extras and Mirinisa. The male hero, Arnaldo, falls for Gia and introduces her to San Bida University, a school for heroes that contrasts with the villain academy. Gia's interactions with Arnaldo lead to a softening of her heart. In the real world, Jingo thanks Gia for exposing him, saying that he found peace in redeeming himself afterwards. Gia also reconciles with her mother and gives her an authentic luxury item, before meeting up with Abet to amicably break up with him.

Arnaldo expresses his desire to see Gia's dimension, but Gia is warned off by Mauricia, who reveals that Mimi was killed off from Batas ng Api and banished to the Island of the Laos (transl. Has-beens) for having a forbidden relationship with an extra. In a climactic scene, Gia goes off-script and stages a mutiny with the help of the sympathetic extras, who are tired of their marginal roles, forcing the intervention of the production crew who enter through a portal. Gia rallies everyone to change the series' script, but Mauricia runs off to the portal, seeking to complain to the TV network's executive, known as The Sponsor, and have the entire cast and crew banished to the Island of the Laos. Mauricia interrupts a board meeting at the network's offices where she explains her case to The Sponsor. Gia explains that the typical soap opera tropes have become overworked and need to be replaced, and the extras propose various new content ideas. The Sponsor agrees to a trial run as a frustrated Mauricia storms off.

Months later, the Batas ng Api cast, including Mimi and her boyfriend, are now the lead players in their own TV shows. Arnaldo enters into a full-blown relationship with Gia and moves to her dimension. Gia goes on a date with Arnaldo at his apartment, as they laugh at Mauricia in her TV show struggling to clean the toilet as the sole owner of the now-dilapidated mansion used in Batas ng Api.

== Cast ==
=== Main ===
- Barbie Forteza as Gigi/Gia
- Eugene Domingo as Mauricia

=== Supporting ===
- Jameson Blake as Arnaldo
- Carmina Villarroel as Betty
- Ysabel Ortega as Mirinisa
- Yasser Marta as Abet
- Michael de Mesa
- Xyriel Manabat as Mimi
- Myrtle Sarrosa as Patricia "Peachy"
- Jonathan Tadioan as Jingo
- Jaime Fabregas as The Sponsor

=== Cameos ===
- Rez Cortez (Facial Expression)
- Dimples Romana (Insults)
- Odette Khan (Principal)
- Celia Rodriguez (History)
- Jean Garcia (Art)
- Pinky Amador (Languages)
- Gladys Reyes (Mathematics)
- Baron Geisler (Physical Education)
- Mylene Dizon (Science)
- Susan Africa (San Bida University instructor)

== Production ==
=== Development ===
Netflix announced the project on January 31, 2025. Early promotional photos showed the lead actresses in formal dresses with the tagline, "Bida or kontrabida, you decide." The film was written and directed by Chris Martinez. This marked a collaboration between Martinez and Domingo, who had previously worked together on the Kimmy Dora series and Ang Babae sa Septic Tank. The film has a runtime of one hour and 48 minutes.

=== Casting and themes ===
Eugene Domingo stated that the film highlights the contributions of "kontrabidas" (villains) to the industry. She noted that Filipino audiences might be evolving to root for characters who are assertive rather than just underdogs. To prepare for her role, Barbie Forteza used lessons she learned from an online acting masterclass she took with Cherie Gil during the COVID-19 pandemic. Forteza stated that the film explores how a "villainous" influence can change a person's life. The film includes a tribute to deceased actors known for villain roles, including Gil, Bella Flores, and Zeny Zabala.

== Release and marketing ==
The official trailer was released in August 2025. To promote the film, Netflix held a launch event called the "Kontrabida Ball" at The Peninsula Manila. The event featured gothic decor, including crimson drapes and candlelit chandeliers. Attendees included the cast and iconic Philippine screen villains.

The film began streaming on Netflix on September 11, 2025. It was made available in over 200 countries.

== Reception ==
Kontrabida Academy reached the number one spot on the "Top 10 Movies in the Philippines Today" list on Netflix shortly after its release.

Fred Hawson of ABS-CBN News gave the film a positive review, praising Eugene Domingo for embracing the "villainy" of her role. He also complimented Barbie Forteza for her acting range during her character's transformation. However, Hawson criticized the scenes set at the "hero school," describing the fashion and subjects there as cliché. Rolling Stone Philippines called the film "camp with a capital K" and noted it as an ode to teleserye villains. Ica Hontiveros-Cheng of BusinessMirror wrote that the film is a "call to change." She interpreted the plot as a message that people should stand up for their rights against oppression.
