= Eros Atalia =

Filipino author and journalist

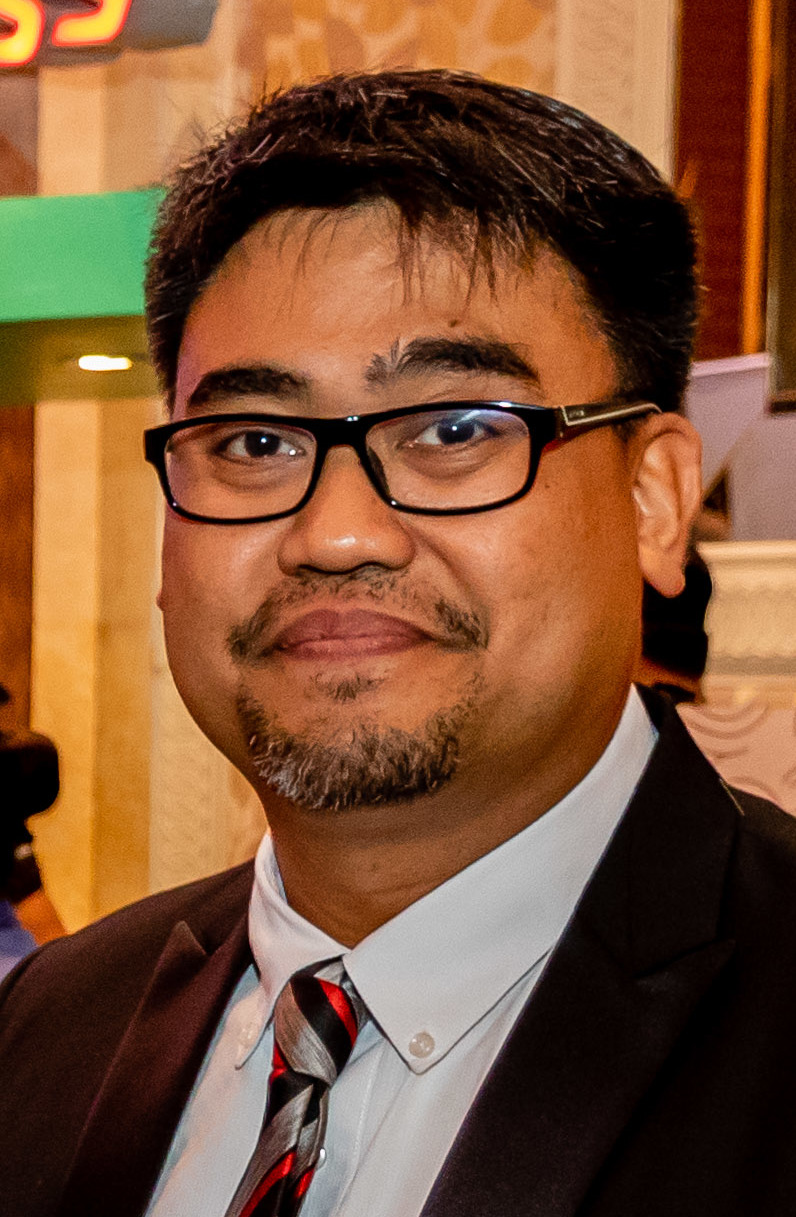
Atalia in 2018

Eros S. Atalia is a Filipino author, professor and journalist from Cavite City, Philippines who wrote several books including the Palanca Award-winning 'Tatlong Gabi, Tatlong Araw' (lit. Three Nights, Three Days) in 2013 and Ang Ikatlong Anti-Kristo' (lit. The Third Antichrist) in 2017. His book 'Ligo Na U, Lapit Na Me' (published in 2009) was adapted into film in 2011. He is a faculty member at De La Salle University Manila, and was a resident at the International Writing Program of the University of Iowa. Atalia also co-founded the defunct local newspaper Responde Cavite, where he also served as an editor.

== Bibliography ==
- Taguan-Pung at Manwal ng Pagpapatiwakal (2005)
- Peksman (Mamatay ka Man) Nagsisinungaling Ako (2007)
- Ligo na U, Lapit na Me (2009)
- Wag Lang Di Makaraos (2011)
- It's Not That Complicated: Bakit Hindi Pa Sasakupin ng Alien ang Daigdig sa 2012 (2012)
- Tatlong Gabi, Tatlong Araw (2013)
- Ang Ikatlong Anti-Kristo (2017)
