= 2021 Cinemalaya =

17th Cinemalaya Independent Film Festival
- Official festival poster
- Location: N/A (Virtual event)
- Film titles: 13
- Festival date: August 6 – September 5, 2021
- Language: English, Filipino
- Website: www.cinemalaya.org

Cinemalaya chronology
- 2022 2020

The 17th Cinemalaya Independent Film Festival was held from August 6 to September 5, 2021. Only short films were featured for this edition for the second consecutive year, with entrants streamed online due to the COVID-19 pandemic in the Philippines. Entrant films were made available in the streaming platforms KTX.ph and Vimeo.

== Entries ==
The following are the final thirteen short films eligible for Best Picutre from at least 200 submissions. They were announced in June 2021.

The winning film is highlighted with boldface and a dagger.

Short films

| Title | Director(s) |
|---|---|
| Ang Sadit na Planeta | Arjanmar H. Rebeta |
| Ang Mga Nawalang Pag-asa at Panlasa | Kevin Jay Ayson |
| Ate OG | Kevin Mayuga |
| Ang Pagdadalaga ni Lola Mayumi | Shiri Francesca D. De Leon |
| **Beauty Queen** ^{†} | Myra Aquino |
| Crossing | Marc Misa |
| Kawatan Sa Salog | Ralph John Velasco |
| Kids On Fire | Kyle Nieva |
| Looking For Rafflesias and Other Fleeting Things | James Fajardo |
| Maski Papano | Che Tagyamon; Glenn Barit |
| Namnama en Lolang | Jonnie Lyn Dasalla |
| Out of Body | Enrico Po |
| The Dust in Your Place | David Olson |

== Awards ==
The awards ceremony was held online on August 19, 2021.

Short films

- Best Short Film – Beauty Queen by Myra Aquino
  - Special Jury Prize – Ang Sadit na Planeta by Arjanmar H. Rebeta
  - Audience Choice Award – Ang Sadit na Planeta by Arjanmar H. Rebeta
- Best Direction – Kyle Nieva for Kids on Fire
- Best Screenplay – Kids on Fire
- NETPAC Award – Ang Sadit na Planeta by Arjanmar H. Rebeta
