= Doll House (2022 film) =

- Directed by: Marla Ancheta
- Screenplay by: Onay Sales; Erwin Blanco; Faye Lorenzo
- Starring: Baron Geisler; Althea Ruedas; Mary Joy Apostol
- Production company: Mavx Production
- Distributed by: Netflix
- Release date: 7 October 2022
- Running time: 107 minutes
- Country: Philippines
- Languages: English, Filipino

Doll House is a 2022 Filipino drama film directed by Marla Ancheta and written by Onay Sales, Erwin Blanco and Faye Lorenzo. It stars Baron Geisler, Althea Ruedas and Mary Joy Apostol.

== Synopsis ==
The film revolves around Rustin, a troubled lead singer of a rock band, who struggles with addiction but still tries to rekindle the relationship he never had with his young daughter Yumi.

== Cast ==
- Baron Geisler as Rustin
- Althea Ruedas as Yumi, Rustin’s daughter
- Mary Joy Apostol as adult Yumi
- Phi Palmos as Bok
- Katreena Beron as Rachelle
- Izah Hankammer as Sheena
- Alwyn Uytingco as Diego
- Ricardo Cepeda as Rustin’s father

== Production ==
Doll House was directed by Marla Ancheta and written by Onay Sales, Erwin Blanco and Faye Lorenzo. The film was produced under Mavx Productions. Filming for Doll House took place in Rotterdam, Netherlands, and in the Philippines. Doll House is Baron Geisler's return to acting after a long hiatus.

== Release ==
Doll House premiered globally on October 7, 2022 through Netflix. The film received multiple accolades from critics, who refer to the film as "heartbreaking". During the Netflix Tudum 2022, the streaming franchise announced that Doll House topped the Netflix Philippines list as the most-watched movie. Doll House bagged six awards at the Asia-Pacific Luminare Awards: best movie of the year (Doll House), best director (Marla Ancheta), best screenplay (Onay Sales), best child star (Althea Ruedas), and best actor of the decade (Baron Geisler). Geisler has also been awarded as Asis's Best Actor at the Thailand International Leadership Awards 2023.
