= Albie Casiño =

Filipino actor (born 1989)

- Born: Alan Benedict Lee Casiño; Makati, Philippines
- Education: De La Salle–College of Saint Benilde
- Occupation: Actor
- Years active: 2009–present
- Agents: Star Magic (2010–2013; 2019–2023); Leo Dominguez; Viva Artist Agency (2023–present)
- Partner(s): Michelle Arceo (2016–2019); Michelina (2023–present)
- Children: 2

Alan Benedict "Albie" Lee Casiño is a Filipino actor best known for his role as Christian in the television series Mara Clara (2010). He is also well known for his roles on On the Wings of Love (2015–2016), Pusong Ligaw (2017–2018), Precious Hearts Romances Presents: Los Bastardos (2018–2019), Linlang (2023), and Can't Buy Me Love (2023–2024).

== Personal life ==
Casiño was involved in a controversy with ex-girlfriend Andi Eigenmann. Eigenmann was reportedly almost five months pregnant on June 29, 2011. She then revealed that the father of her child was her "first" boyfriend, with Albie being one of the suspected individuals.

Meanwhile, Eigenmann's then present boyfriend, Jake Ejercito, already denied that he is the father while Albie's mother neither confirmed nor denied that Albie is the father of Andi's unborn child. However, in an interview of Eigenmann's father, Mark Gil, he hinted that the father of the child is Eigenmann's first and only boyfriend; he also said that Ejercito was not the father and he respected him for being there. Eventually, after a 5-year dispute, in September 2016, it was finally confirmed by Eigenmanns's sister in a podcast, that Jake Ejercito, is the confirmed father, and that a paternity test was taken, without Casiño's knowledge.

In August 2015, Casiño revealed his battle with attention deficit hyperactivity disorder or ADHD, citing it as a reason for his departure from ABS-CBN.

Casiño entered the Pinoy Big Brother (PBB) house in the 2021 Celebrity edition of the reality show, and has opened up about his struggles with ADHD which resulted to his altercation with fellow housemate Alexa Ilacad. The tension around his reclusive personality eventually lead to his eviction from the said show.

Casiño subsequently was in a relationship with model and beauty pageant contestant Michelle Arceo from 2016 to 2019 and is currently in a relationship with Michelina since 2023. On June 12, 2024, Casiño announced that Michelina had given birth to their son, Roman Andrew, back in April 28. The couple were engaged in 2025.

=== Bar altercation and assault ===
On May 4, 2012, Andi Eigenmann saw Casiño at a bar in Makati and reportedly threw wine on Casiño's face and slapped him. Casiño went to the restroom "to clean himself up" with the intention of leaving the bar after but he and a friend were purportedly followed and assaulted in the parking lot by Eigenmann's companions. The commotion was later stopped by a bouncer. Eigenmann's companions included Frank Magalona, son of rapper Francis Magalona, and Jeck-Jeck Lacson, son of politician Ping Lacson.

== Filmography ==
=== Television series ===
| Year | Title | Role |
|---|---|---|
| 2010 | Your Song Presents: Gimik 2010 | Albie Marquez |
| 2010 | Maynila: Misa de Gallo | Mart |
| 2010–2011 | Mara Clara | Christian Torralba |
| 2010–2011 | Noah | Levi (teen) |
| 2011 | 100 Days to Heaven | Reggie |
| 2011 | Wansapanataym: Wallet | Vincent |
| 2011 | Maalaala Mo Kaya: Toga | Phil Lipp Peene |
| 2012 | Maynila: Ang Choosy Mong Heart | Danny |
| 2013 | Cassandra: Warrior Angel | Jude Solcruz |
| 2014 | Confessions of a Torpe | Jack Malaqui |
| 2015 | On the Wings of Love | Diego "Jigs" Fausto |
| 2016 | FPJ's Ang Probinsyano | Richmond Subito |
| 2016 | Wansapanataym: Just Got Laki | Jake |
| 2017 | Karelasyon: Magnanakaw Ng Puso | Gilbert |
| 2017 | Wagas: Padyak para sa pag-ibig | young Alfredo |
| 2017 | Karelasyon: Bugso | Joel/Lando |
| 2017 | Ipaglaban Mo: Putol | Vincent |
| 2017–2018 | Pusong Ligaw | Leon Del Mundo |
| 2018 | Wagas: Love After HIV | Cris |
| 2018–2019 | Precious Hearts Romances Presents: Los Bastardos | Lucas Aguilar-Cardinal |
| 2019 | Ipaglaban Mo: Biyaheng Langit | Rey |
| 2020 | Ang sa Iyo ay Akin | Victor Montelibano |
| 2021 | Pinoy Big Brother: Kumunity Season 10 | Celebrity Housemate |
| 2021 | Init sa Magdamag | Raymund |
| 2022 | The Chosen One: Soap Opera | Elijah Docomos |
| 2022 | Bola Bola | |
| 2023 | Drag You & Me | Ricardo "Ricky" Sabas Jr. |
| 2023 | Linlang | Ricky |
| 2023–2024 | Can't Buy Me Love | Charleston Young Tiu |
| 2025 | FPJ's Batang Quiapo | Iñigo Guerrero/Montenegro-Torres |
| 2025 | It’s Okay to Not Be Okay | Junjun |
| 2026 | Blood vs Duty | SPO4 Liam Rodriguez |

=== Television shows ===
| Year | Title | Role |
|---|---|---|
| 2009–2010 | SOP | Himself / Performer |
| 2012 | Happy Yipee Yehey! | Himself / Guest |
| 2013 | The Tim Yap Show | Himself / Guest |
| 2017 | ASAP | Himself (member of ASAP Coverboys) |
| 2022 | Top Class | Co-host |
| 2024-2025 | Face To Face Harapan | Substitute co-host |

=== Web series ===
| Year | Title | Role |
|---|---|---|
| 2022 | How to Move On in 30 Days | Jake |

=== Film ===
| Year | Title | Role | Notes |
|---|---|---|---|
| 2011 | Aswang | Gabriel | |
| 2012 | Shake, Rattle & Roll 14 | Neil | Segment: "Unwanted" |
| 2012 | The Animals | Jake | 8th Cinemalaya Independent Film Festival |
| 2014 | Somebody to Love | Jason | |
| 2016 | The Escort | Kenneth | |
| 2016 | Die Beautiful | Migs | |
| 2016 | That Thing Called Tanga Na | Russell | |
| 2016 | Magtanggol | | |
| 2017 | Pwera Usog | Bobby | |
| 2018 | Rainbow's Sunset | Jonel | |
| 2018 | First Love | Sebastian | |
| 2018 | I Love You, Hater | Andrew | |
| 2019 | Ang Henerasyong Sumuko Sa Love | Hadji | |
| 2020 | Isa Pang Bahaghari | Domingo "Domeng" delos Santos (young) | |
| 2025 | Sampung Utos Kay Josh | Ali | |
| 2025 | Elevator Lady | Jay | |
| 2025 | 100 Awit Para Kay Stella | Von | |
| 2026 | A Werewolf Boy | Juancho | |

== Awards and nominations ==
| Award | Year | Category | Work | Result | Ref. |
|---|---|---|---|---|---|
| Film Ambassadors Night | 2020 | Honoree | Rainbow's Sunset | Won | |
| Gawad Tanglaw Awards | 2017 | Best Performance by an Actor in a Single Performance | MMK: Picture | Won | |
| International Film Festival Manhattan | 2019 | Best Ensemble Acting | Rainbow's Sunset | Won | |
| PMPC Star Awards for Movies | 2012 | New Movie Actor of the Year | Aswang | Nominated | |
| Yahoo! Philippines OMG! Awards | 2011 | Best Awesome Young Actor | Mara Clara | Won | |
