= The Gifted (film) =

2014 film by Chris Martinez

- Theatrical movie poster
- Directed by: Chris Martinez
- Written by: Chris Martinez
- Produced by: Vic del Rosario Jr.; Raam Punjabi
- Starring: Anne Curtis; Cristine Reyes; Sam Milby
- Cinematography: Gary Gardoce
- Edited by: Vanessa de Leon
- Music by: Teresa Barrozo
- Production companies: Viva Films; MVP Entertainment
- Distributed by: Viva Films
- Release date: September 3, 2014
- Running time: 121 minutes
- Country: Philippines
- Languages: Filipino; English
- Box office: $1.7 million

The Gifted is a 2014 Filipino comedy revenge-romance film written and directed by Chris Martinez. The Gifted was produced by Viva Films and MVP Entertainment. The film stars Anne Curtis, Sam Milby, and Cristine Reyes. It was released September 3, 2014.

The Film was nominated at the 31st PMPC Star Awards for Movies for the "Movie of the Year" category. Anne Curtis, who played one of the lead roles, was also nominated for the "Movie Actress of the Year" category.

== Plot ==
Marco Yuzon, a young and promising author, attends a book signing event for his new autobiography, The Gifted. He begins by reading a few chapters:

Zoe Tuazon, a rich, multiracial, overweight, aggressive, and intelligent girl, goes to a school for an entrance exam with the unattractive Aica Tabayoyong and their parents. Despite their high intelligence, they are not admitted to the school, but are instead enrolled at St. Therese of Avila School, which is more prestigious.

Zoe damages her reputation by questioning the Story of Creation and discussing the Big Bang Theory during religion class, after which she is punished. The following day, Aica farts during a music class, getting ridiculed by the teacher and her classmates ("Aica-diri", lit. 'Disgusting'). The two outcasts become close friends and cause trouble at school by poisoning the school's drinking water supply and setting a booby trap for the religion teacher, instilling fear in the entire school.

In high school, Zoe and Aica compete for valedictorian honors. Zoe's mother urges her to find Aica's weakness. A new student, Mark Ferrer, arrives, and Aica falls for him. Zoe convinces Mark to pretend to love Aica in exchange for doing his homework and helping him cheat. Despite not being attracted to Aica, Mark dates her, and their arrangement continues.

After high school, Aica majors in Mathematics at the Ateneo de Manila University, while Zoe studies Neuroscience at Princeton; both graduate summa cum laude.

Before returning to the Philippines, Zoe undergoes intensive liposuction while Aica undergoes plastic surgery to become more attractive. They both start modeling careers and become rivals again. Zoe encounters Mark, who has graduated from a U.S. university. Still bitter with Aica, Zoe gets revenge by having a video of Aica farting during music class played at their batch reunion, causing her fellow alumni to ridicule her again for it.

Aica follows Zoe to her house, where a booby trap almost kills her. After several failed attempts to kill Aica, Zoe gives up when Aica nearly drowns her. They make up, but Zoe reveals it was an act and points a gun at Aica. Aica runs into Mark, who shields her from the gunshot, wounding his face. Mark is hospitalized, and Aica asks Zoe to apologize. Initially, Zoe shows no remorse, but seeing a picture of wounded Mark, she realizes her mistake. Aica and Mark marry on the day Zoe plans to leave the country. Zoe sets a contraption in their hotel room, revealing a picture of her and Aica as children, with an apology written on its back; this marks the end of Marco's book.

After the book signing, Marco is confronted by Aica at the carpark, who slams a copy of his book onto his car windshield. Zoe, who is with her, also looks the same as they did in childhood, having never undergone cosmetic surgery. It is revealed by Aica and Zoe (whose actual names are Micah and Joey) that they were Marco's classmates in elementary and high school. Marco, bitter from ranking third in honors while the girls were top two and being rejected by them, projected his childhood trauma, loneliness, and antics (poisoning the water supply, booby trapping the religion teacher, and farting in music class) onto them and portrayed them as lovestruck for men. Micah and Joey then remind Marco that he was an outcast because of his bad personality. The two women demand Marco sign their book with his blood and then beat him up.

== Cast ==
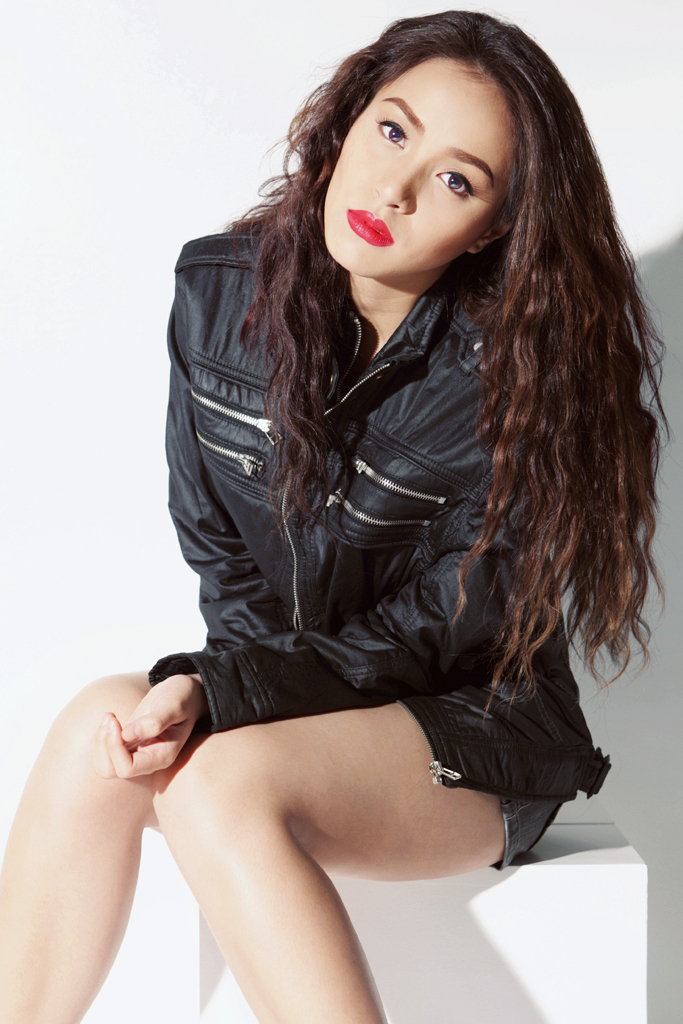
Cristine Reyes portrays Aica Tabayoyong / Micah

=== Main cast ===
- Anne Curtis as Zelda Olezia Eloize "Zoe" Gomez Tuazon / Joey
- Cristine Reyes as Aica Tabayoyong / Micah
- Sam Milby as Mark Ferrer / Marco Yuzon

=== Supporting cast ===
- Candy Pangilinan as Aica/Micah's Mother
- Dominic Ochoa as Aica/Micah's Father
- Arlene Muhlach as Zoe/Joey's mother
- Ricky Rivero as Zoe/Joey's Father
- Isay Alvarez
- Yam Concepcion
- Ana Abad Santos as Ms. Moral
- Kalila Aguilos
- Rubi Rubi
- Racquel Villavicencio as Sister Angeline

=== Guest cast ===
- Alliya Fatima dela Riva as young Aica Tabayoyong / Micah
- Kevin Remo as young Mark Ferrer / Marco Yuzon
- Abby Bautista as young Zoe Tuazon / Joey
- Ashley "Petra Mahalimuyak" Rivera
- Shehyee Ongkiko as Batchmate
- Irish Den Lanting
- Van Dyke Atienza as Taho vendor

== Awards and nominations ==
Award	Category	Recipient	Result	Ref
31st PMPC Star Awards for Movies	Movie of the Year	The Gifted	Nominated	
31st PMPC Star Awards for Movies	Movie Actress of the Year	Anne Curtis	Nominated	
