= 2008 Cinemalaya =

4th Cinemalaya Independent Film Festival
- Opening film: Adela by Adolfo Alix, Jr.
- Location: Metro Manila, Philippines
- Film titles: 20
- Festival date: July 11, 2008–July 20, 2008
- Website: Official Website

Cinemalaya chronology
- 2009 2007

The 4th Cinemalaya Independent Film Festival was held from July 11 until 20, 2008 in Metro Manila, Philippines.

== Entries ==
The winning film is highlighted with boldface and a dagger.

=== Full-Length Features ===
Title	Director	Cast
100	Chris Martinez	Mylene Dizon, Eugene Domingo, Tessie Tomas, TJ Trinidad
Baby Angelo	Joel Ruiz	Archie Alemania, Mark Gil, Alchris Galura
Boses	Ellen Ongkeko-Marfil	Coke Bolipata, Julian Duque
Brutus	Tara Illenberger	Ronnie Lazaro, Yul Servo
Concerto	Paul Alexander Morales	Meryll Soriano, Jay Aquitania, Shamaine Buencamino
Huling Pasada	Paul Sta. Ana; Alvin Yapan	Agot Isidro, Neil Sese, Dimples Romana
**Jay** ^{†}	Francis Pasion	Baron Geisler, Coco Martin, Flor Salanga
My Fake American Accent	Ned Trespeces	Miles Canapi
Namets!	Jay Abello	Christian Vasquez, Angel Jacob, Peque Gallaga
Ranchero	Michael Cardoz	Archie Adamos, Gary Lim

=== Short films ===
Title	Director
**Andong** ^{†}	Rommel Tolentino
Angan-Angan	Sheron Dayoc
Diamante ng Langit	Vic Acedillo
God Only Knows	Mark Reyes
Huling Biktima	Vitaliano Rave
Ang Ibang Mga Pamilya	Joel Ruiz
My Pet	Ann Bigornia
Panggaris	Dexter Cayanes
Trails of Water	Sheron Dayoc
Tutos	L.A. Yamsuan

== Awards ==
Full-Length Features

- Best Film - Jay by Francis Xavier Pasion
  - Special Jury Prize - Brutus, Ang Paglalakbay by Tara Illenberger
  - Audience Award - 100 by Chris Martinez
- Best Direction - Chris Martinez for 100
- Best Actor - Baron Geisler for Jay
- Best Actress - Mylene Dizon for 100
- Best Supporting Actor - Yul Servo for Brutus, Ang Paglalakbay
- Best Supporting Actress - Eugene Domingo for 100
- Best Screenplay - Chris Martinez for 100
- Best Cinematography - Dan Villegas for Huling Pasada and Jay Abello for Brutus, Ang Paglalakbay
- Best Sound - Allan Hilado for Ranchero
- Best Editing - Kats Serraon, Chuck Gutierrez, Francis Xavier Pasion for Jay
- Best Original Music Score - Joey Ayala for Brutus, Ang Paglalakbay
- Best Production Design - Cristina Honrado for Baby Angelo
- Special Citation - Angan-Angan by Sheron Dayoc

Short Films

- Best Short Film - Andong by Rommel Tolentino
  - Special Jury Prize - My Pet by Anna G. Bigornia
  - Audience Award - God Only Knows by Mark V. Reyes
- Best Direction - Mark V. Reyes for God Only Knows
- Best Screenplay - Rommel Tolentino for Andong
