= 2009 Cinemalaya =

Film festival in the Philippines

5th Cinemalaya Independent Film Festival
- Official poster
- Opening film: Manila by Adolfo Alix, Jr. & Raya Martin
- Location: Metro Manila, Philippines
- Film titles: 20
- Festival date: July 17, 2009–July 26, 2009
- Website: Official Website

Cinemalaya chronology
- 2010 2008

The 5th Cinemalaya Independent Film Festival was held from July 17 until 26, 2009 in Metro Manila, Philippines.

== Entries ==
The winning film is highlighted with boldface and a dagger.

=== Full-Length Features ===
Title	Director	Cast
24K	Ana Agabin	Julio Diaz, Archie Adamos
Colorum	Jobin Ballesteros	Lou Veloso, Alfred Vargas
Dinig Sana Kita	Mike Sandejas	Zoe Sandejas
Engkwentro	Pepe Diokno	Celso Ad. Castillo, Felix Roco
**Last Supper No. 3** ^{†}	Veronica Velasco	Joey Paras, Jojit Lorenzo, JM De Guzman
Mangatyanan	Jerrold Tarog	Che Ramos, Irma Adlawan, Neil Sese
Ang Nerseri	Vic Acedillo	Timothy Mabalot, Jaclyn Jose
Ang Panggagahasa kay Fe	Alvin Yapan	Irma Adlawan, TJ Trinidad, Noni Buencamino
Sanglaan	Milo Sogueco	Ina Feleo, Tessie Tomas
Squalor	G.B. Sampedro	Dennis Trillo, Sid Lucero

=== Short films ===
Title	Director
Behind Closed Doors	Mark Philipp Espina
Blogog	Rommel Tolentino
Si Bok at Ang Trumpo	Hubert Tibi
**Bonsai** ^{†}	Borgy Torre
Hulagpos	Maita Lirra Lupac
Latus	John Paul Seniel
Musa	Dexter Cayanes
Tatang	Jean Paolo Hernandez
Ugat sa Lupa	Ariel Reyes
Wat Floor Ma'am	Mike Sandejas; Robert Seña

== Awards ==
Full-Length Features

- Best Film - Last Supper No. 3 by Veronica Velasco
  - Special Jury Prize -
    - Ang Panggagahasa kay Fe by Alvin Yapan
    - Colorum by Jobin Ballesteros
  - Audience Award - Dinig Sana Kita by Mike Sandejas
- Best Direction - G.B. Sampedro for Squalor
- Best Actor - Lou Veloso for Colorum
- Best Actress - Ina Feleo for Sanglaan
- Best Supporting Actor - Arnold Reyes for Squalor
- Best Supporting Actress - Tessie Tomas for Sanglaan
- Best Screenplay - Vic Acedillo for Ang Nerseri
- Best Cinematography - Pao Orendain for 24K
- Best Sound - Ditoy Aguila, Junel Valencia for Squalor
- Best Editing - Charliebebs Gohetia for Squalor
- Best Original Music Score - Francis Reyes for Dinig Sana Kita
- Best Production Design - Benjamin Padero for Mangatyanan
- Special Citation - Engkwentro by Pepe Diokno
- NETPAC Award - Bakal Boys by Ralston Jover
- National Council for Children's Television Award - Dinig Sana Kita by Mike Sandejas

Short Films

- Best Short Film - Bonsai by Borgy Torre
  - Special Jury Prize - Blogog by Rommel Tolentino
  - Audience Award - Tatang by Jean Paolo Hernandez
- Best Direction - Dexter B. Cayanes for Musa
- Best Screenplay - Mark Philipp Espina for Behind Closed Doors
