= Island Dreams (film) =

- Directed by: Gino M. Santos; Aloy Adlawan
- Screenplay by: Kenneth Au
- Story by: Aloy Adlawan; Kenneth Au
- Produced by: Kenneth Au; Fredalaine Au
- Starring: Louise delos Reyes; Alexis Petitprez; Irma Adlawan
- Cinematography: Carlo Mendoza
- Edited by: Ryan Allen V. Diaz
- Music by: April M. Hernandez; Alfredo Ongleo
- Production company: Kenau Pictures
- Release date: December 18, 2013 (Metro Manila Film Festival)
- Running time: 88 minutes
- Country: Philippines
- Languages: Filipino; English

Island Dreams is a 2013 Filipino romantic comedy film directed by Gino M. Santos and Aloy Adlawan, written by Adlawan, and starring Louise delos Reyes and Alexis Petitprez. It was an official selection in the 39th Metro Manila Film Festival under the New Wave Category and won the Most Gender-Sensitive Film Award.

== Plot ==
An unaccredited tour guide and a heartbroken tourist form a romantic bond as they explore the wilds of Philippine Islands.

== Cast ==
- Louise delos Reyes as Julie
- Alexis Petitprez as Zach
- Irma Adlawan as Marie
- Natasha Villaroman as Stacy
- Chanel Latorre as Karen
- Marlo Mortel as Himself
- Brandon Reid as Himself

== Production ==
Producer Kenneth Au wrote the original screenplay, but it was deemed too ambitious. He hired director Adlawan to revise the storyline to fit a more modest budget. However, the theme of the struggle between the head and the heart was kept. Au stated that the title has a double meaning: 'ISLAND' presents the more than 7,000 islands of the Philippines and the character Zach, played by Alexis Petitprez heading to the island for personal reasons; 'DREAMS' represents Julie's ambition to become famous and that we all have dreams.

Adlawan invited Santos to collaborate on Island Dreams. Santos, who had always wanted to make a romantic comedy, agreed and set out to make a film that would be "up to international standards".

== Reception ==
Rito P. Asilo of the Philippine Daily Inquirer wrote, "The film is so adorable that it's easy to disregard its implausibilities [...] Moreover, Island Dreams will win you over with its infectious optimism and charming whimsy, anchored on the vibrant chemistry of Delos Reyes and Petitprez. For hopeless romantics, this is the movie to see!".
