= The Animals (film) =

2012 Filipino coming-of-age film directed by Gino M Santos

- Official Poster
- Directed by: Gino M. Santos
- Written by: Jeff Stelton
- Produced by: Gino M. Santos; Jane Torres
- Starring: Albie Casiño; Dawn Jimenez; Patrick Sugui
- Cinematography: Alex Espartero
- Edited by: Rona Delos Reyes; John Wong
- Music by: Diwa de Leon; DJ Nix Damn P!
- Production companies: Stained Glass Productions; Cinemalaya
- Release date: July 20, 2012 (Cinemalaya Independent Film Festival)
- Running time: 80 minutes
- Country: Philippines
- Languages: Filipino, English

The Animals is a 2012 Filipino coming-of-age film directed by Gino M. Santos. It is about the daily struggles of three teens living in upper middle class Manila. The film is one of the official entries at the 8th Cinemalaya Film Festival in 2012 and won Best Editing. The film continued to receive wide recognition, such as being nominated for Best Screenplay, Best Cinematography, and Best Musical Score at the 36th Gawad Urian Award, as well as international premieres in the Stockholm International Film Festival and the New York Asian Film Festival.

== Synopsis ==
Set in an affluent, upper middle class village in the suburbs, The Animals chronicles a day in the life of Jake (Albie Casiño), Trina (Dawn Jimenez), and Alex (Patrick Sugui), who go through the musings that every kid in high school has to deal with. All Jake wants to do is have a good time, Alex just wants to fit in, and Trina simply wants more. A vivid picture is painted of life in high school after the final bell rings, as well as a different side of the Philippines, and what is happening to its privileged children.

== Cast ==
- Albie Casiño as Jake
- Dawn Jimenez as Trina
- Patrick Sugui as Alex/Bogli
- John Wayne Sace as Marco/Kukurikapoo
- Carlo Cruz as Master David
- Andrew Felix as Head Master
- Micah Cabral as Leslie
- Vangie Martell as Cara
- Issa Litton as Trina and Alex's Mom
- Brian Homecillo as Pierre
- Raul Morit as the Taxi Driver

== Reception ==
Oggs Cruz of Twitch Film wrote, "With the film, Santos reveals himself to be a filmmaker with a lot of both promise and room to improve on." Richard Kuipers of Variety wrote that the film "is technically rough but has plenty to say about peer pressure and the desire to be popular."
