= Baron Geisler =

Filipino actor (born 1982)

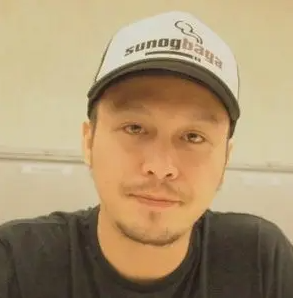
- Geisler in 2010
- Born: Baron Frederick von Geisler; June 5, 1982 (age 44); Clark Air Base, Angeles City, Pampanga, Philippines
- Education: Chevalier School Inc. All Nations College Inc. (B.A.)
- Occupations: Actor, entrepreneur
- Years active: 1994–present
- Agent(s): Star Magic (1997–2009); ALV Talent Circuit (2009–present); Viva Artists Agency (2021–present)
- Height: 1.70 m (5 ft 7 in)
- Spouse: Jamie Marie Evangelista-Geisler (m. 2019)
- Children: 2
- Relatives: Donald Geisler (brother); Jen Da Silva (sister-in-law)

Baron Frederick von Geisler (Tagalog: [ˈgaɪslɛɾ]; born June 5, 1982) is a Filipino actor and entrepreneur of German-American descent.

One of the most controversial actors in the Philippines, Geisler's career has been characterized by critical and popular acclaim for his talent as a character actor, as well as ignominy stemming from his alcohol abuse and history of misconduct.

Geisler's acting accolades includes winning the Best Actor award in the 4th Cinemalaya Independent Film Festival on July 20, 2008, and the 19th PMPC Star Awards for Television Best Single Performance of an Actor in 2005 for Maalaala Mo Kaya. Geisler's performance in the 2022 Netflix film Doll House has also earned him praise from critics, audiences, and fellow actors. He gained a resumption of critical repute and resurgence of commercial success in 2025 for his portrayal as Miguel Tecson in the action drama series Incognito.

== Early life and background ==
Geisler was born in Clark Air Base, Angeles City, Pampanga to Gracia Cantor Bayonito of Calabanga, Camarines Sur, Philippines and Donald David Geisler Jr., a German American who was stationed at the former U.S. military base in Angeles City. His older brother Donald Geisler is a taekwondo athlete.

== Acting career ==
Geisler entered show business as a child actor in 1994 when he auditioned through the phenomenal variety kiddie/teen gag show, Ang TV in his hometown in Pampanga. Out of 2000 auditionees, he was the only one accepted. He subsequently played minor roles in Ang TV and in Ang TV Movie: The Adarna Adventure (1996). A year later, he became officially a part of ABS-CBN's roster of rising homegrown talents as a member of the elite Star Circle Batch 5 (1997). He was considered as one of the network's most promising young stars alongside John Lloyd Cruz and Marc Solis in the teen boy trio "Koolits", where he was once paired up with Kristine Hermosa. Around this time, Geisler continued acting in supporting and teen idol roles alongside his fellow Ang TV and Star Circle co-stars, including Nagbibinata (1997), Haba-baba-doo! Puti-puti-poo! (1998), Oo na… Mahal na Kung Mahal (1999), Tar-San (1999), and Gimik (1999). It was when he appeared in an episode of the now-defunct TV series F.L.A.M.E.S. (1999) where he got paired up with his most notable loveteam partner, ex-girlfriend Jodi Sta Maria. Their chemistry proved to be a hit as they would go on to become part of the mainstay cast and one of the original loveteams in the hit youth-oriented weekend TV series Tabing Ilog (1999). In the following year, Geisler would go on to play the role of Michael, the son of Josie (played by legendary Filipina actress Vilma Santos), in one of the highest grossing Filipino films of all time, Anak (2000).

In 2007, Geisler joined Pinoy Big Brother: Celebrity Edition 2 along with older brother Donnie. In 2009, after winning multiple acting awards from television and the independent circuit, Geisler has considered changing network from ABS-CBN to GMA Network after being offered to be a part of SRO Cinemaserye of GMA. Yet, he remained a freelance actor appearing to both networks. Geisler is currently a part of ALV Talent Circuit, Inc.

In 2011, Geisler played Erning Toothpick (a character originally played by actor Paquito Diaz based on its real life counterpart, Ernesto Reyes) in the 2011 Metro Manila Film Festival entry of Viva Films, Manila Kingpin: The Asiong Salonga Story top-billed by then-Laguna Governor Jeorge "ER" Ejercito Estregan.

In 2014, Geisler starred in an independent film titled Waves co-starring Polish-American model Ilona Struzik. Geisler was part of the fantasy series Dyesebel in the same year with Anne Curtis, Sam Milby, and Gerald Anderson where he played one of the villains, the devious Kanor de la Paz. He was also part the 1st Batch of Lucky Stars in Kapamilya Deal or No Deal.

In 2017, Geisler made his theater debut as Tikbalang/Amerikano in Tanghalang Pilipino's rock sarswela "Aurelio Sedisyoso".

In May 2019, after going in sabbatical for alcohol dependence recovery in Cebu, Geisler returned to acting via FPJ's Ang Probinsyano in a critically acclaimed performance where he played one of the show's villains. He previously starred himself in a special participation role in 2015.

For his lead role in the Netflix film Doll House, Geisler was awarded Asia's Best Actor In a Lead Role at the Thailand International Leadership Awards 2023.

Geisler's role as Dr. Miguel "Jaguar" Tecson in the 2025 hit series Incognito was met with universal acclaim.

Geisler cites veteran Filipino actor Johnny Delgado as a major influence in acting.

== Personal life ==
Geisler enjoys drawing and writing poems. Geisler's family house was razed by fire twice in 2004.

In 2018, Geisler joined Maranatha Christian Fellowship, a "Bible-based, spirit-led congregation" in Cebu, and speaking about mental health awareness at various symposiums.

On September 12, 2019, Geisler married his girlfriend Jamie Marie Evangelista, a psychologist from Cebu City, in a civil wedding at the Quezon City Hall. Together, they have a daughter born in January 2020.

Geisler has been residing in Cebu since his marriage. Geisler announced that he was working on his AB Theology degree through a modular course in 2019. He completed such degree in 2022. In 2020, Geisler revealed that he enlisted to be a Philippine Navy reservist.

In September 2019, initial reports surfaced online saying that Geisler was conferred to the title of "Peace and Prosperity Ambassador" by Mohammadmamay Hasan Abdurajak and Maria Makiling Helen Fatima Nasaria Panolino Abdurajak allegedly from the Royal Sultanate of Sulu and North Borneo, thus making Geisler a Datu of Sulu. However, this was dismissed officially by the Royal House of Sulu's Chancellery which stated that both Hasan and Helen Abdurajak are "commoners with no royal blood" and are "not even recognized by the Philippine government as one of the claimants to the Sultanate of Sulu".

On July 19, 2024, actress Nadia Montenegro revealed on Fast Talk with Boy Abunda that Geisler is the father of her youngest daughter Sophia, who was born in 2006.

== Controversies ==
Geisler has been described as one of the most controversial actors of his generation. A self-proclaimed alcoholic who started drinking as early as 14 years old, Geisler made headlines early in his career after his mother confined him in a detox facility for 10 days and was involved in a high-profile bar brawl in Pampanga that left him visibly scarred in the face. Geisler was tagged as the "Wild Child" of Philippine showbiz, a nickname widely used in 2007 during his stint in Pinoy Big Brother: Celebrity Edition 2.

=== Sexual assault ===
In 2008, Geisler was charged with act of lasciviousness by Patrizha Martinez (daughter of fellow Pinoy Big Brother housemate Yayo Aguila and William Martinez), after he allegedly touched her breasts and made sexual advances while he was drunk during a party in a bar in Makati. Geisler denied the accusations. He was found guilty in 2013 and was sentenced to a minimum of six months and maximum of over two years in prison, in addition to paying ₱30,000 to Martinez for damages and community service.

In 2009, Geisler faced another act of lasciviousness lawsuit from actress Yasmien Kurdi. According to news reports, Geisler allegedly made unwanted sexual advances towards Kurdi, groped her and masturbated in front of the actress while filming for the TV series SRO Cinemaserye. Kurdi agreed to withdraw the criminal charges in 2011 after the two actors reconciled.

In April 2010, Geisler was accused of harassing Eat Bulaga! co-host Julia Clarete during a wrap-up party for an independent film. Geisler reportedly groped Clarete in the buttocks and breasts while they were performing a song together on stage. Clarete affirmed the reports, but admitted that she intentionally downplayed the issue to avoid jeopardizing her own career.

In 2011, actress Cherry Pie Picache, accused Geisler of groping her breasts on the set of TV series Noah. Picache filed the complaint directly with the Philippine Artists Managers Incorporated (PAMI) and the management of ABS-CBN, seeking an "indefinite artist ban" for Geisler. Geisler was additionally accused of inappropriately kissing and groping a female member of the production staff. Child actors Zaijan Jaranilla and Xyriel Manabat were also said to have been traumatized by Geisler's "extreme" behavior while on set. Following the complaint, ABS-CBN immediately removed Geisler's character from Noah while PAMI issued a ban on working with Geisler for all artists managed by its members. Geisler voluntarily went through a 90-day rehabilitation program to treat his alcoholism, while PAMI ruled that it will lift the ban on Geisler upon completing his rehabilitation.

=== Misconduct and physical violence ===
In November 2012, Geisler was detained by the Quezon City Police District after assaulting a sari-sari store owner and his wife. According to police reports, Geisler was irritated when he went to buy something but was not immediately noticed by the store owners. He then proceeded to scatter bread around the store, threw a chair at the store, and attacked the owner who went out to confront him. Geisler was initially charged with malicious mischief and physical injuries, which were later dropped after the couple reached a settlement with Geisler. Geisler's brother and his manager claimed that the actor was struggling from bipolar disorder and may have missed his medication that night.

In 2015, a video of an alleged altercation between Geisler and a bouncer at a bar in Angeles City went viral in social media. The bouncers denied him entry as he was visibly drunk, which was against the bar's policies. Geisler reportedly then became aggressive and challenged the bouncers to a fistfight, but eventually left of his own accord. Geisler's management later released a statement claiming discrimination against the actor, adding that there was "no justifiable reason" for the bar's management to deny Geisler's admission other than his past reputation.

On September 15, 2015, Geisler was involved in a car accident but left unhurt. Geisler's SUV crashed with a 16-wheeler truck in Pasig before dawn. Geisler was presumably under the influence of alcohol according to early reports. Geisler's vehicle and the truck were brought to the Pasig traffic bureau as the investigation continued to determine who was at fault. According to a report from DZMM posted on the ABS-CBN website, the Traffic Division of Pasig said that Geisler was driving his car after his taping when he got into an accident with the truck. No one was hurt but according to Geisler, his companion during the clash suffered minor injuries.

On May 15, 2016, Geisler again featured in a viral video showing him verbally berating a production team and assaulting a student filmmaker from the University of the Philippines. Geisler was allegedly hired by the students for a school project, but was reportedly furious after the students failed to give him his script on time and resorted instead to using "idiot boards" or cue cards. Geisler's publicist issued a statement to the press the following day claiming that the viral video was "taken out of context". The video was taken later down after Geisler and the student resolved their issues, with both denying that the viral video was a staged publicity stunt.

Not long after on May 25, 2016, another viral video showed Geisler being involved in a brawl with independent film actor Kiko Matos in a bar in Tomas Morato Avenue, Quezon City. The video show Geisler attempting to shake hands with Matos after an apparent argument, but Matos instead repeatedly threw punches at Geisler instead before the rest of the bar patrons could separate them. Following the incident, Universal Reality Combat Championship (URCC), a mixed-martial arts promoter, announced that the two actors will participate in an exhibition MMA match on June 25, 2016. The match ended in a 19–19 draw.

It was later revealed in December 2016 that the bar brawl between Geisler and Matos was a staged performance art for a documentary called Beastmode: A Social Experiment. The documentary's production, however, claims that the invitation from the URCC was unplanned and the subsequent MMA match was also not choreographed.

In November 2016, actor Ping Medina accused Geisler of urinating on him on the set of the movie Bubog during a scene in which Medina was gagged and his hands and feet were bound. In a prior conversation, Medina was made to believe that Geisler would only spit on him during the scene. Geisler apologized for the incident, adding he was drunk and on heavy medication during the filming of the scene. Geisler was removed from the film production, while PAMI meted out a second indefinite ban on Geisler on December 4, 2016. The ban was lifted in September 2017.

On October 16, 2017, Quezon City police arrested Geisler at a TGI Fridays branch in Tomas Morato, Quezon City. The management of TGI Fridays had previously banned Geisler in all of its Philippine branches for unruly behavior, and staff called the police after an irate Geisler challenged a security guard to a fistfight while the guard was trying to pacify him. Geisler was charged with unjust vexation and alarm and scandal. He was released from jail after a week. Prior to the incident, Geisler also had a standing arrest warrant issued in Cebu for smoking inside a plane, in violation of the Civil Aviation Authority Act.

On March 5, 2018, Geisler was again arrested by Angeles City police after he threatened to kill his brother-in-law Michael Robinstone Morales. According to police reports, Geisler was seen shirtless and holding a kitchen knife while kicking the gate of Morales' house when police arrived to respond to Morales' call. He was charged with grave threat, alarm and scandal, and illegal possession of a deadly weapon. Morales dropped the charges when Geisler agreed to enter intensive rehab.

On February 22, 2025, Geisler was briefly detained and fined by police in Mandaue for public drunkenness.

== Business venture ==
During his time in Cebu where he took his alcohol rehabilitation in 2019, Geisler sold his property including his car to open up Gents Barber, a barber shop located in Gaisano Country Mall, Cebu City that employs recovering addicts and alcoholics.

== Acting credits ==
=== Film ===
Key
†	Denotes films that have not yet been released

Baron Geisler's film credits with year of release, film titles and roles
Year	Title	Role	Notes	Ref.
1996	Ang TV the Movie: The Adarna Adventure	Corky		
1998	Haba-baba-doo, puti-puti-poo!	Baron		
1998	Nagbibinata	Hans Tolentino		
1999	Oo Na, Mahal Na Kung Mahal	Ivan Del Carmen		
1999	Tar-San	Koby		
2000	Anak	Michael		
2001	Taxi ni Pilo			
2002	Jologs	Cher		
2006	Ang Huling Araw ng Linggo	Bryan		
2006	Wag Kang Lilingon	Red	Segment: "Salamin"	
2007	Durog			
2007	A Love Story	Macky		
2008	Supahpapalicious	Sir Juno		
2008	Jay	Jay Santiago		
2008	Torotot	Leo		
2008	Baler	Capt. Enrique Fossi de las Morenas		
2009	BFF: Best Friends Forever			
2009	Padyak	Manolo		
2009	Manila	Jorge		
2009	The Forgotten War			
2009	Kimmy Dora: Kambal sa Kiyeme	Harris		
2009	Nandito Ako Nagmamahal Sa'Yo	Prince Suganob		
2009	Maximus & Minimus			
2010	Noy	Caloy		
2010	Fling	Boyfriend 2		
2010	Donor	Danny		
2010	Cinco	Frat. Master Greg	Segment: "Braso"	
2011	Captured			
2011	Manila Kingpin: The Asiong Salonga Story	Erning Toothpick		
2012	Pridyider	Dick		
2012	El Presidente	Lt. Chacon		
2013	Sapi			
2013	Holdup	Holdupper		
2013	Saks Saka			
2013	Lihis			
2013	Boy Golden: Shoot to Kill, the Arturo Porcuna Story	Datu Putla		
2014	Waves	Ross		
2014	Muslim Magnum .357: To Serve and Protect	Yusuf		
2015	Maria Labo			
2016	Padre de Familia	Raymond		
2016	Just the 3 of Us	Marco		
2016	Ma' Rosa	Sumpay		
2016	Hasa			
2018	Rekuwerdo	Chris		
2018	Alpha: The Right to Kill			
2021	Tililing	Peter		
2021	Barumbadings	Rochelle		
2022	Doll House	Rustin Clyde Villanueva		
2023	Moro	Abdel		
2024	GG: Good Game	Kurt		
2024	Dearly Beloved	Deo		
2025	Kontrabida Academy	P.E. Teacher		
2025	The Delivery Rider	Santo		

=== Television ===
Key
†	Denotes films that have not yet been released

Baron Geisler's television credits with year of release, title(s) and role
Year	Title	Role	Notes	Ref.
1994	Ang TV	Himself		
1995–2005	ASAP	Himself — host/performer		
1997	Esperanza	Loy-Loy		
1997–1998	Gimik	Choy Ledesma		
1998–2000	Cyberkada	Himself		
1999	Tabing Ilog	Alfonso "Fonzy" Ledesma		
2001	Wansapanataym	Louie / Luisa	Episode: "Si Louie, Si Luisa"	
2001	Recuerdo de Amor	Francis Sebastian		
2003–2004	It Might Be You	Derek Castro		
2005	Vietnam Rose	Billy		
2005	Hollywood Dream	Himself — contestant		
2005	Maalaala Mo Kaya	Macoy	Episode: "Trolley (Pasan)"	
2006	Malaala Mo Kaya	Joel (Justin's older brother)	Episode: "Lapis"	
2006	Calla Lily	Jerry		
2006	Komiks Presents: Da Adventures of Pedro Penduko	Ka Roy		
2006	Maging Sino Ka Man	Kevin Romero		
2006	Maalaala Mo Kaya	Lito	Episode: "Bisikleta (Basilica Minore del Sto. Niño de Cebu)"	
2007	Sineserye Presents: May Minamahal	Bombit Fernandez		
2007–2008	Pinoy Big Brother: Celebrity Edition 2	Himself — housemate		
2008	I Love Betty La Fea	Ian		
2008	Carlo J. Caparas' Pieta	Young Miguel		
2008	Eva Fonda	Val Mendez		
2008	Sine Novela: Gaano Kadalas ang Minsan	Jake		
2008	Obra: Liwanag sa Dilim	Gate		
2009	Tayong Dalawa	Leo Cardenas		
2009	Midnight DJ	Andy	Episode: "Killer Kulambo"	
2009	Pangarap Kong Jackpot		Episode: "Sa Ngalan Ng Busabos"	
2009	Jim Fernandez's Kambal Sa Uma	Young Aurelio		
2009	May Bukas Pa	Mr. Sanchez		
2009	SRO Cinemaserye: Suspetsa	Danny		
2009	Komiks Presents: Mars Ravelo's Nasaan Ka Maruja?	Jeff Gomez		
2009	The Wedding	Monty		
2010	Maalaala Mo Kaya	Raul	Episode: "Saranggola"	
2010	Agimat: Ang Mga Alamat ni Ramon Revilla Presents: Elias Paniki	Alexander		
2010	Noah	Caleb		
2010	Banana Split: Daily Servings	Ismael	Segment: "Mahirap Pa Sa Dagang Mahirap"	
2011	Maalaala Mo Kaya	Janelle	Episode: "Ice Cream"	
2011	Maalaala Mo Kaya	Jess	Episode: "Sulat"	
2011	Ikaw ay Pag-Ibig	Turko		
2013	Kidlat	Vincent Megaton Jr. / Diablo		
2014	Mars Ravelo's Dyesebel	Kanor Dela Paz		
2015	Kapamilya, Deal or No Deal	Himself/#8 Lucky Star (Batch 1)		
2015	Bridges of Love	Young Lorenzo Antonio		
2015	Nathaniel	Tagasundo / Gustavo Palomar		
2015	FPJ's Ang Probinsyano	David Madarang		
2016	Bubble Gang	Various		
2016	Karelasyon	John Lloyd	Episode: "Biktima"	
2016	Wagas	Dick Israel		
2017	Amo	Joben		
2019	FPJ's Ang Probinsyano	Dante "Bungo" Madarang		
2021	Di Na Muli	Tomas		
2022–2023	The Iron Heart	Janus Salazar		
2023–2024	Senior High	Harry Aguerro		
2023–present	ASAP	Himself / Host / Performer		
2025	Incognito	Dr. Miguel "Migs" Tecson / Jaguar		
2025–2026	FPJ's Batang Quiapo	Rocky Boy Mondragon		
2026	Blood vs Duty	Felix Domingo		
