= 2020 Cinemalaya =

Filipino film festival

16th Cinemalaya Independent Film Festival
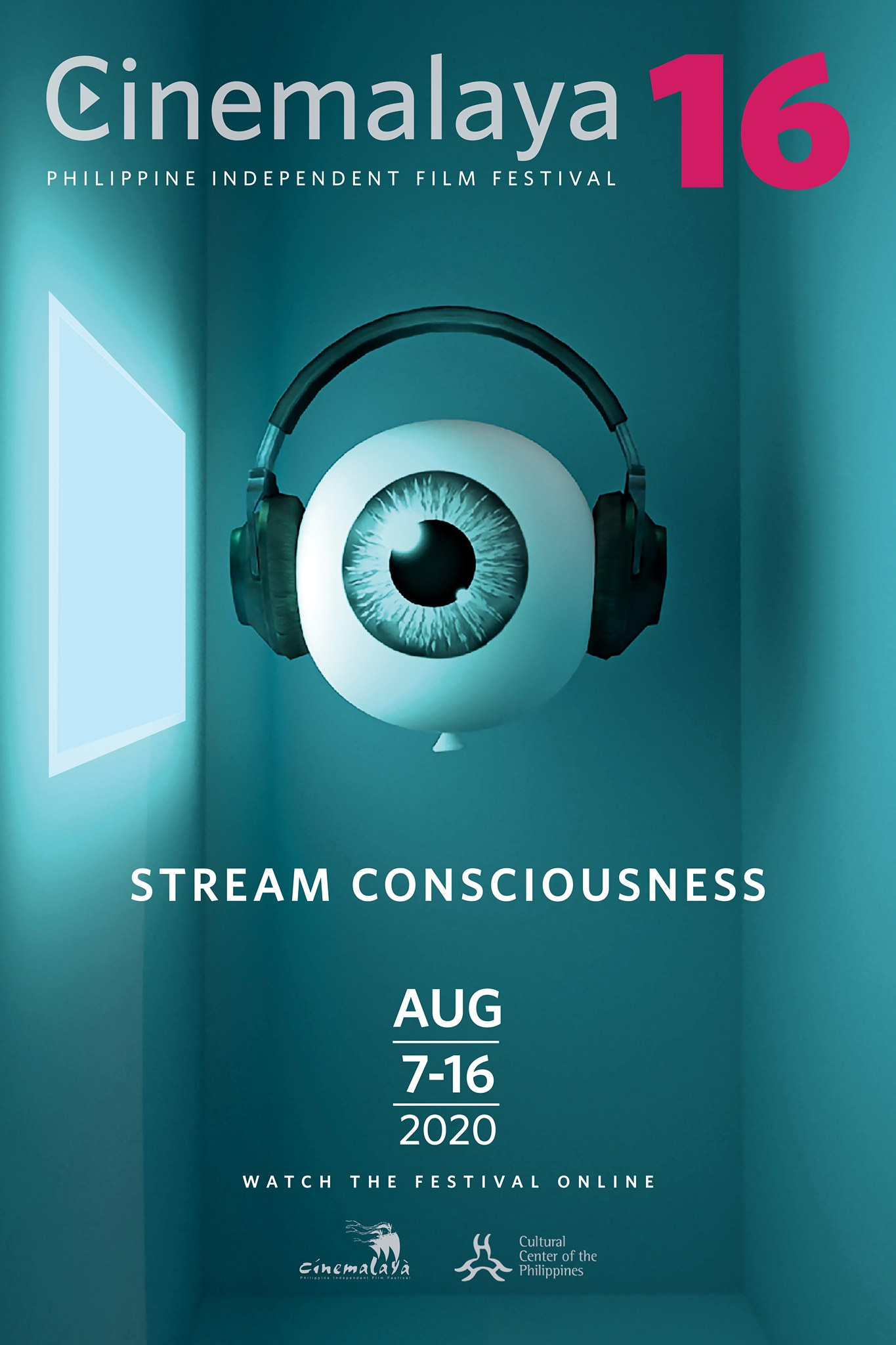
- Official festival poster
- Location: N/A (Virtual event)
- Film titles: 10
- Festival date: August 7–16, 2020
- Language: English, Filipino
- Website: Official Website

Cinemalaya chronology
- 2021 2019

The 16th Cinemalaya Independent Film Festival was held from August 7 to 16, 2020. Only short films were featured for this edition, with entrants streamed online via Vimeo due to the COVID-19 pandemic in the Philippines.

== Entries ==
The following are the final ten short films eligible for Best Picutre from 244 submissions. They were announced in July 2020. Submissions were submitted as finished works prior to the COVID-19 lockdowns.

The winning film is highlighted with boldface and a dagger.

Short films

Title	Director(s)
Ang Gasgas na Plaka ni Lolo Bert	Janina Gacosta; Cheska Marfori
Excuse Me, Miss, Miss, Miss	Sonny Calvento
Living Things	Martika Ramirez Escoba
**Tokwifi** ^{†}	Carla Pulido Ocampo
The Slums	Jan Andrei Cobey
Fatigued	James Mayo
Quing Lalam Ning Aldo (Under the Sun)	Reeden Fajardo
Ang Pagpakalma Sa Unos (To Calm The Pig Inside)	Joanna Vasquez Arong
Utwas (Arise)	Richard Salvadico; Arlie Sweet Sumagaysay
Pabasa Kan Pasyon (Chanting the Passion)	Hubert Tibi

== Awards ==
The awards ceremony was held online on August 12, 2020.

Short films

- Best Short Film – Tokwifi by Carla Pulido Ocampo
  - Special Jury Prize – Ang Pagpakalma sa Unos by Joanna Vasquez Arong
  - Audience Choice Award – Quing Lalam Ning Aldo by Reeden Fajardo
- Best Direction – Martika Ramirez Escobar for Living Things
- Best Screenplay – Pabasa Kan Pasyon
- NETPAC Award – Tokwifi by Carla Pulido Ocampo
