= 2007 Palanca Awards =

Philippine literary award

57th Palanca Awards
- Date: September 1, 2007
- Location: The Peninsula Manila, Makati City, Philippines

The 57th Don Carlos Palanca Memorial Awards for Literature was held on September 1, 2007, at The Peninsula Manila in Makati to commemorate the memory of Don Carlos Palanca Sr. through an endeavor that would promote education and culture in the country. Senator Mar Roxas was Guest of Honor and Speaker at this year's awarding ceremony. This year saw the discontinuation of the Dulang Pantelebisyon category in the Filipino Division, after seventeen years. Also discontinued is the Future Fiction category, English and Filipino, after seven years.

Nicolas B. Pichay was this year's Palanca Hall of Fame awardee. He clinched his fifth first prize for “Tres Ataques de Corazon” under the Full-Length Play category. The said award is given to writers who have won five first places in any category.

The 2007 winners are divided into four categories:

== English Division ==
=== Short Story ===
- First Prize: Angelo Rodriguez Lacuesta, "Flames"
- Second Prize: Douglas James Limpe Candano, "Dreaming Valhalla"
- Third Prize: Crystal Gail Shangkuan Koo, "Benito Salazar's Last Creation"

=== Short Story For Children ===
- First Prize: Lakambini A. Sitoy, "The Elusive Banana Dog"
- Second Prize: Dean Francis Alfar, "Poor, Poor Luisa"
- Third Prize: Ian Rosales Casocot, "The Last Days of Magic"

=== Poetry ===
- First Prize: Mikael de Lara Co, "Hands for a Fistful of Sand"
- Second Prize: José Edmundo Ocampo Reyes, "Imaginary Numbers"
- Third Prize: Dinah Roma-Sianturi, "Geographies Of Light"

=== Essay ===
- First Prize: Wilfredo Pascual Jr., "Lost In Childrensville"
- Second Prize: Rosalinda Lejano-Massebieau, "Culture Shocked: A Story of Recovery"
- Third Prize: Allan J. Pastrana, "The Lady's Train"

=== One-Act play ===
- First Prize: Debbie Ann Tan, "Time Waits"
- Second Prize: Joshua L. Lim So, "Portraits"
- Third Prize: Allan Lopez, "Battery Park"

=== Full-Length Play ===
- First Prize: Jorshinelle Taleon-Sonza, "Pure"
- Second Prize: Glenn Sevilla Mas, "Games People Play"
- Third Prize: Cynthia Lapeña-Amador, "The Piano"

== Filipino Division ==
=== Maikling Kwento ===
- First Prize: Allan Alberto N. Derain, "Paputian ng Laba"
- Second Prize: Jerome B. Gomez, "Desperately, Susan"
- Third Prize: Dana Batnag, "D Bampyr Chronicles...O Kwento Ng Mga Tao Sa Bayang Walang Hope"

=== Maikling Kwentong Pambata ===
- First Prize: Sheila Gonzales-Dela Cuesta, "Junior"
- Second Prize: Joachim Emilio B. Antonio, "Ang Ampalaya Sa Pinggan Ni Peepo"
- Third Prize: Michael M. Coroza, "Imibisibol Man Ang Tatay"

=== Tula ===
- First Prize: Carlos M. Piocos III, "Corpus"
- Second Prize: Rebecca T. Añonuevo, "Paglingon sa Pag-Asa at Iba Pang Tula"
- Third Prize: Renato L. Santos, "Sosy, Atbp..."

=== Sanaysay ===
- First Prize: Annalyn L. Leyesa, "Bahay-Bahayan"
- Second Prize: Ma. Jovita E. Zarate, "Sa Hulo't Libis ng Aking Bayan"
- Third Prize: Maribel Bagabaldo-Frasure, "Stet"

=== Dulaang May Isang Yugto ===
- First Prize: Christopher D. Martinez, "Our Lady of Arlegui"
- Second Prize: Jose Dennis C. Teodosio, "Baka Sakali"
- Third Prize: Lateya P. Bucoy, "Ellas Innocentes"

=== Dulang Ganap ang Haba ===
- First Prize: Nicolas B. Pichay, "Tres Ataques De Corazon"
- Second Prize: Edward P. Perez, "Apuntador"
- Third Prize: Rodolfo C. Vera, "Ang Mga Huwad"

=== Dulang Pampelikula ===
- First Prize: Miguel G. Alcazaren, "Prisoner Alpha"
- Second Prize: Marlon G. Miguel, "Kolono"
- Third Prize: Renei Patricia E. Dimla, "Katay"

== Regional Division ==
=== Short Story [Cebuano] ===
- First Prize: Merlie M. Alunan, "Pamato"
- Second Prize: Ferdinand L. Balino, "Absent, Ma'am"
- Third Prize: Noel P. Tuazon, "Kundat sa Unang Gugma"

=== Short Story [Hiligaynon] ===
- First Prize: Peter Solis Nery, "Candido"
- Second Prize: Felino Salem Garcia Jr., "Sa Hingapusan"
- Third Prize: No Winner

=== Short Story [Iluko] ===
- First Prize: Noli S. Dumlao, "Dadapilan"
- Second Prize: Bernardo D. Tabbada, "Ti Danapidip Nga Addang Ni Manong Rod"
- Third Prize: Aurelio S. Agcaoili, "Alimpapatok Iti Panawen Ti Ariangga"

== Kabataan Division ==
=== Kabataan Essay ===
- First Prize: Cristina Gratia T. Tantengco, "Humor, Faith, Bayanihan and Kayod: Survival Tools For The 21st Century Filipino"
- Second Prize: Juan Emmanuel P. Batuhan, "Sterling Pinoy"
- Third Prize: Hannah L. Co, "Adaptability"

=== Kabataan Sanaysay ===
- First Prize: Anna Larisa Viktoria U. Vega, "Ang Huling Ngiti ng Pagkalinga"
- Second Prize: Mary Anne Jelli E. Gaza, "Isang Siglo, Isang Dekada't Isang Taon"
- Third Prize: Kathleen Teresa M. Ramos, "Tatawa Na 'Yan"

== Sources ==
- "The Don Carlos Palanca Memorial Awards for Literature | Winners 2007". Archived from the original on 2009-10-27.
