= Gino M. Santos =

Filipino film director and producer (born 1989)

- Born: Gino Martin Martinez Santos; November 12, 1989 (age 36); Manila, Philippines
- Citizenship: Filipino
- Education: De La Salle Santiago Zobel School; De La Salle-College of Saint Benilde
- Occupations: Film Director; Producer; College Professor
- Years active: 2007–present

Gino M. Santos (born November 12, 1989) is a Filipino film director and producer. He also teach at CIIT College of Arts and Technology.

== Education ==
Gino Santos graduated with a digital filmmaking degree from De La Salle-College of Saint Benilde in 2012. To further hone his craft, he enrolled in filmmaking workshops at Asia Pacific Film Institute, The Marilou Diaz-Abaya film institute, and The New York Film Academy Filmmaking workshop in Kyoto, Japan.

== Career ==
He has directed numerous short films that have garnered attention not just locally, but also internationally, in film festivals held in Berlin and Los Angeles. He is a two-time recipient of the Honorable Mention award from Gawad CCP for his short films "Ang Tangke" (The Water Tank) and an experimental film "Bangungot" (Sleep Paralysis). His college thesis, "Labing Dalawa" (Twelve) received a Best Short Film nomination at the 35th Gawad Urian Awards.

"Every Other Time" was his short film entry to the 7th Cinemalaya Philippine Independent Film Festival. He directed his first full-length feature – The Animals – a year later, which premiered at the same festival.

The Animals received the Best in Editing award at Cinemalaya, and continued on receiving wide recognition, such as Best Screenplay, Best Cinematography, and Best Musical Score at the 36th Gawad Urian Awards, as well as international premieres in Stockholm International Film Festival and New York Asian Film Festival.

He co-directed his second full-length feature, entitled Island Dreams, with director and screenwriter Aloy Adlawan. The film was an entry to the Metro Manila Film Festival – New Wave Category, and received the Most Gender Sensitive award.

#Y, his third full-length feature premiered at the 10th Cinemalaya Philippine Independent Film Festival in August 2014.

Gino currently directs The Tim Yap Show with Tim Yap on the GMA Network.

== Filmography ==
=== Film ===
Year	Date Released	Title	Role	Note(s)
2012	July 20	The Animals	Director, Producer and Co-Writer	
2013	December 18	Island Dreams	Director	
2014		#Y	Director	
2015	September 2	Ex with Benefits	Director	
2016	April 22	Lila	Director	2016 Sinag Maynila Film Festival entry
2016	May 25	Love Me Tomorrow	Director	
2018	February 14	Sin Island	Director	
2024	May 1	Men Are From QC, Women Are From Alabang	Director	
2025	May 7	In Between	Director	

=== Short film ===
Year	Title	Role
2009	"Time Sprint"	Director, Editor, and Writer
2010	"Ang Tangke"/"The Watertank"	Director, Editor, and Writer
2011	"Bangungot"/"Sleep Paralysis"	Director, Editor, and Writer
2011	"Labing Dalawa"/"12"	Director, Editor, and Writer
2011	"Every Other Time"	Director, Actor, Editor, and Writer

=== Television ===
Year	Title	Role
2013–Present	The Tim Yap Show (Seasons 1-5)	Director
2024	Eat Bulaga Lenten Special: Selda ng Kahapon	Director
2024	Eat Bulaga Lenten Special: Love Thy Neighbor	Director
2024	Eat Bulaga Barangay Cinema: Barangay Mananay: Nanay, Nanay, Paano Ka Nawala?	Director
