= The Woman in the Septic Tank =

- Theatrical movie poster
- Directed by: Marlon N. Rivera
- Screenplay by: Chris Martinez
- Produced by: Chris Martinez; Marlon Rivera; Josabeth Alonso; John Victor Tence
- Starring: JM De Guzman; Kean Cipriano; Cai Cortez; Eugene Domingo
- Cinematography: Larry Manda
- Edited by: Ike Veneracion
- Music by: Vincent A. de Jesus
- Production companies: Cinemalaya; Martinez Rivera Films; Quantum Films Production; Straight Shooters Media, Inc.
- Distributed by: Star Cinema
- Release date: July 15, 2011
- Running time: 87 minutes
- Country: Philippines
- Language: Filipino
- Box office: ₱38.4 million

The Woman in the Septic Tank (Filipino: Ang babae sa septic tank) is a 2011 Philippine satirical black comedy film directed by Marlon Rivera, written by Chris Martinez, and starring JM De Guzman, Kean Cipriano, Cai Cortez and Eugene Domingo. The film follows three aspiring filmmakers who set out to make a film for the sole purpose of receiving international recognition and awards.

The Woman in the Septic Tank was submitted as the Philippines' official entry for the 2011 Academy Awards for Best Foreign Film, and was an entry for the 2011 Cinemalaya Festival. It was produced by Martinez-Rivera Films and Quantum Films. The film was released on August 3, 2011, by Star Cinema and grossed 38.4 million pesos and was the highest grossing Filipino independent film at the time until it was surpassed in 2015 by That Thing Called Tadhana.

== Overview ==
Chris Martinez wrote the screenplay for the film. Martinez and Rivera submitted the film for the "New Breed, Full Length Film" category for the 7th Cinemalaya Independent Film Festival. The festival was held from July 15 to the 24th at the Cultural Center of the Philippines.

After the mass critical success of the movie at the film festival, Star Cinema purchased the rights to release the film for a wider release. The film was released on August 3, 2011, to over 50 theaters nationwide and grossed almost 40 million pesos becoming the highest grossing Philippine independent film at the time.

=== Synopsis ===
Jocelyn, Rainier, and Bingbong are three film school graduates who are dead-set on making an Oscar-worthy film. They set out to do a quick pre-production as a courtesy call to their lead actress played by Eugene Domingo, and a thorough inspection of their film's major location, the Payatas dumpsite. They believe they have a winning script, and the energy and drive to make their dreams come true, no matter what the cost. There, they use Eugene Domingo's acting skills to her limit, including forcing her to swim in a sewer, despite her pleas that she can do anything, except swim in a sewer.

== Cast ==
- Eugene Domingo plays a fictionalized version of herself, whom the filmmakers want to star in their movie Walang Wala (With Nothing)
  - Domingo also portrays Mila, the protagonist of With Nothing.
- JM De Guzman as Bingbong, the producer of With Nothing, who is focused on adjusting the film to help them gain recognition from festivals and win awards.
- Kean Cipriano as Rainier de la Cuesta, the director of With Nothing.
- Cai Cortez as Jocelyn, the mostly silent production manager of Bingbong who visualizes several scenarios of With Nothing presented by Rainier and Bingbong.

Cherry Pie Picache and Mercedes Cabral appear in cameo appearances as themselves, who are the other options of Bingbong, Rainier and Jocelyn in casting the part of Mila.

Antoinette Jadaone also plays a role as a caterer.

== Reception ==
=== Box office ===
The film broke box office records for the Cinemelaya Independent Film Festival. It is the first full-length film to have its audience tickets sell to its maximum capacity within ten days of showing at the festival. The film was a commercial as well as critical success. The film earned a total of P20 million on its first five days. The total gross of the film amounted to P38.4 million, making it the highest grossing independent film in the history of Philippine cinema until it was surpassed in 2015 by That Thing Called Tadhana.

=== International ===
Richard Kuipers of Variety describes The Woman in the Septic Tank as "a lively laffer." He also praises the performance of lead actors Cipriano and de Guzman, calling it "spot-on as the guys with one eye on the slums and the other on travel and trophies." Meanwhile, Maggie Lee of The Hollywood Reporter says the film is "a lambast of the pretensions of independent cinema in his country and his fellow filmmakers' inflated egos." However, she is concerned about its "specialized topic and low-budget look" that may be off-putting for some audience, which may minimize its commercial prospect internationally. She also compares how the film replays specific sequences, each with narrative or stylistic revisions, to "a Groundhog Day of pilot filmmaking."

The film is an official entry for the 2011 Vancouver International Film Festival, Pusan International Film Festival, the Hawaii International Film Festival, the Tokyo International Film Festival, and the Far East Film Festival. The film was chosen by the Film Academy of the Philippines to represent the Philippines in the Best Foreign Language Film category of the 84th Academy Awards, but it did not make the final shortlist.

=== Awards and nominations ===
Year	Nominee / work	Award	Result
2011	7th Cinemalaya Independent Film Festival*	Best Screenplay (Chris Martinez)	Won
2011	7th Cinemalaya Independent Film Festival*	Audience Choice Awards	Won
2011	7th Cinemalaya Independent Film Festival*	Best Performance of an Actress (Eugene Domingo)	Won
2011	7th Cinemalaya Independent Film Festival*	Best Director (Marlon N. Rivera)	Won
2011	7th Cinemalaya Independent Film Festival*	Best Picture	Won
2012	6th Asian Film Awards	Best Screenwriter (Chris Martinez)	Nominated
2012	6th Asian Film Awards	People's Choice Awards - Favorite Actress (Eugene Domingo)	Won
2012	Federal Ministry for Economic Cooperation and Development (BMZ), Germany	Cinema Fairbindet award	Nominated
2012	10th Gawad TANGLAW for Films	Best Director (Marlon Rivera)	Won
2012	10th Gawad TANGLAW for Films	Best Screenplay (Chris Martinez)	Won
2012	10th Gawad TANGLAW for Films	Best Actress (Eugene Domingo)	Won
2012	10th Gawad TANGLAW for Films	Best Film	Won
2012	28th PMPC Star Awards for Movies	Digital Movie of the Year	Nominated
2012	28th PMPC Star Awards for Movies	Digital Movie Director of the Year (Marlon Rivera)	Nominated
2012	28th PMPC Star Awards for Movies	Movie Actress of the Year (Eugene Domingo)	Nominated
2012	28th PMPC Star Awards for Movies	Digital Movie Original Screenplay of the Year (Chris Martinez)	Nominated
2012	28th PMPC Star Awards for Movies	Digital Movie Cinematographer of the Year (Larry Manda)	Nominated
2012	28th PMPC Star Awards for Movies	Digital Movie Editor of the Year (Ike Veneracion)	Nominated
2012	28th PMPC Star Awards for Movies	Digital Movie Production of the Year (Norma Regalado)	Nominated
2012	28th PMPC Star Awards for Movies	Digital Movie Musical Scorer of the Year (Vincent de Jesus)	Nominated
2012	28th PMPC Star Awards for Movies	Digital Movie Sound Engineer of the Year (Albert Michael Idioma & Addiss Tabong)	Nominated
2012	28th PMPC Star Awards for Movies	Digital Movie Theme Song of the Year ("Sabaw")	Nominated

(*The film was under the New Breed Full Length Feature Category)

== Sequel ==
Following the success of the film, a sequel, The Woman in the Septic Tank 2: Forever is Not Enough, was released on December 25, 2016, as an official entry to the 2016 Metro Manila Film Festival. Rivera and Martinez return as director and writer, respectively, as well as Domingo, Cipriano and Cortez reprising their roles.
