= Mercedes Cabral =

Filipino actress (born 1986)

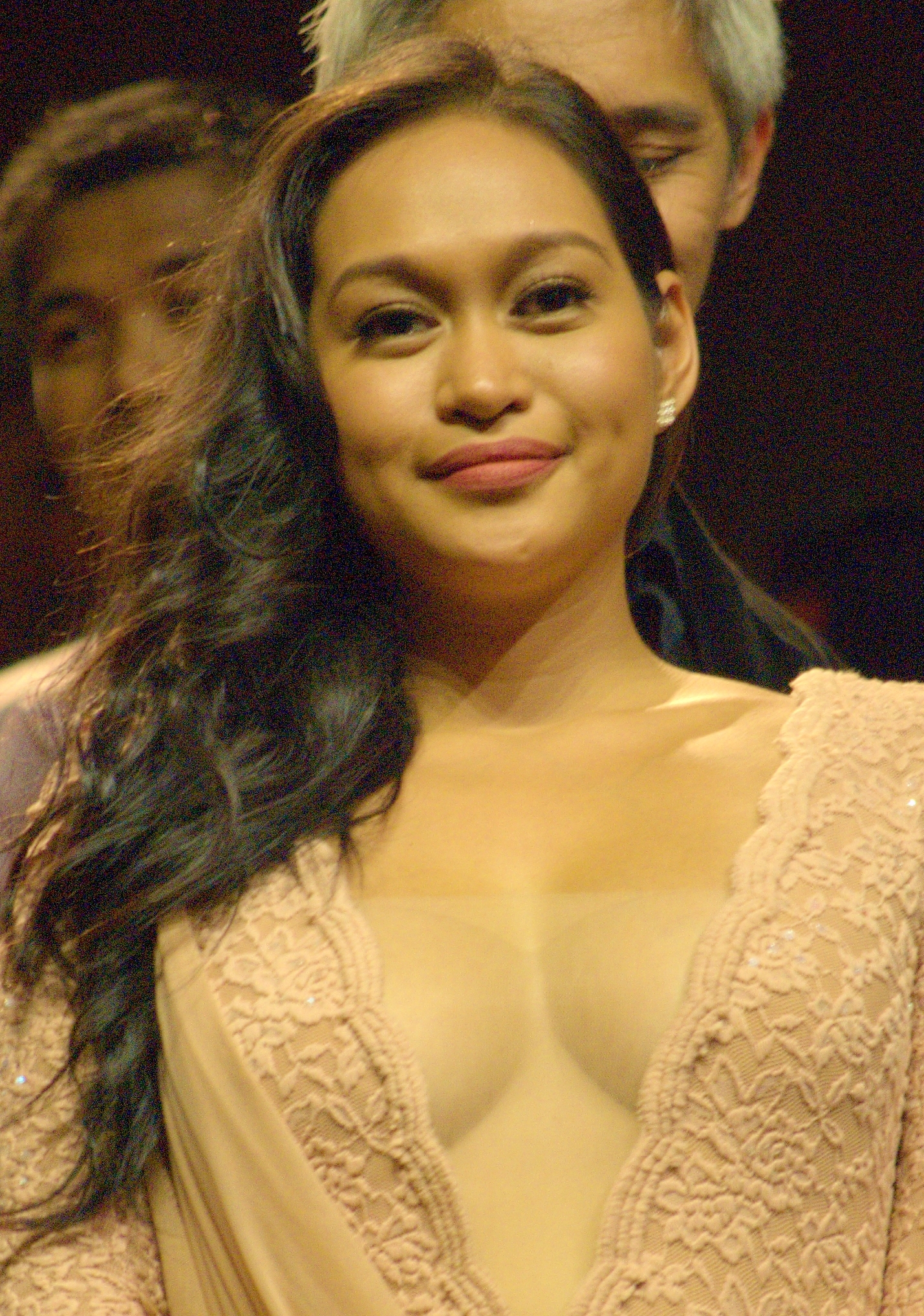
- Mercedes Cabral in 2012
- Born: Maria Mercedes Porte Cabral; August 10, 1986 (age 40); Manila, Philippines
- Education: University of the Philippines Diliman (B.A.)
- Occupation: Actress
- Years active: 2008–present
- Agent(s): ABS-CBN Studios (2011–2012; 2015–2024); GMA Network (2012–2015; 2025–present)

Maria Mercedes Porte Cabral (born August 10, 1986) is a Filipino actress. Known for her roles in arthouse and independent films, she has appeared in numerous international productions. Cabral has received a selection of accolades, including a World Premieres Film Festival Award, a Metro Manila Film Festival Award and a Cinemalaya Independent Film Festival Award.

== Early life and education ==
She studied at the University of the Philippines Diliman, where she majored in sculpture at the College of Fine Arts.

== Career ==
She gained early international recognition in Brillante Mendoza films like Serbis (2008) and Kinatay (2009). She has successfully bridged independent films with mainstream success, recently starring as the viral kontrabida (villain) Lena Cortez in FPJ's Batang Quiapo (2023–2024). Cabral has made a significant return to GMA Network, featuring as Melania Sarmiento in the afternoon drama series Hating Kapatid, which premiered on October 13, 2025. Cabral has officially joined the cast of Honor Thy Mother, an upcoming family drama series that marks the historic third collaboration between Philippine media giants ABS-CBN Studios and GMA Network, in partnership with streaming platform Prime Video.

== Filmography ==
=== Film ===
| Year | Title | Role |
|---|---|---|
| 2008 | Serbis | Merly |
| 2012 | Biktima | |
| 2012 | Thy Womb | Ayesha |
| 2012 | Captive | Emma Policarpio |
| 2012 | The Healing | Kell |
| 2012 | Crossroads | |
| 2015 | Binhi | Cynthia |
| 2016 | Oro | Linda |
| 2016 | Ma' Rosa | Linda |
| 2016 | SUPOT | Cora |
| 2017 | I'm Drunk, I Love You | Carson's friend |
| 2018 | Aurora | Delia |
| 2019 | Culion | Sano |
| 2019 | Pandanggo sa Hukay | Shailmar |
| 2020 | Nightshift | Nora |
| 2020 | U-Turn | Captain Salavador |
| 2023 | Apag | Chedeng |
| 2025 | Lola Barang | |
| 2025 | The Time That Remains | Carms |
| 2025 | Fatherland | Vice Mayor Gwen |
| 2026 | Enjoy Your Stay | Luz |
| 2026 | Desperada | Carol |
| 2026 | Ang Bangkay | Miding |

- Babae ako (short film, 2009)
- Soliloquy (2009)
- Panahon na (2009)
- Latak (2009)
- Karera (2009)
- Tigasan (2009)
- The Rapture of Fe (2009)
- Kinatay (2009)
- Thirst (2009)
- 1017: Sa paglaya ng aking salita (2009)
- Padyak (2009)
- Booking (2009)
- Loophole (2009)
- Chronicle of Wasted Lives (2009)
- Shake, Rattle and Roll 12 (segment "Punerarya", 2010)
- The Night Infinite (2010)
- Ang Babae sa Sementeryo (2010)
- Gayuma (2010)
- Si Techie, si Teknoboy, at si Juana B (2010)
- Blood Ties (2010)
- Garden of Eve (segment "Minsan May Isang Puta", 2010)
- Sakit (short film, 2010)
- Pilgrim Lovers (2011)
- Ligo na Ü, Lapit na Me (2011)
- The Woman in the Septic Tank (2011)
- Liberacion (2011)
- Emille Joson's My Second Mom (short film, 2012)
- Ad Ignorantiam (2012)
- Colossal Woman (2012)
- Hunger Pangs (short film, 2012)
- Aberya (2012)
- Mater Dolorosa (2012)
- Limang Dipang Tao (2012)
- Ginger and Cumin (short film, 2012)
- Imik (2012)
- Ang Nawawala (2012)
- Di ingon 'nato (2011)
- Dog Show (2012)
- Pedro Calungsod: Batang Martir (2013)
- Bingoleras (2013)
- Transit (2013)
- Playtime (2013)
- Bad Romance (2013)
- Rosita (2014)
- Serpent Sword and the Betrayal (2014)
- Force of Angel (2014)
- The Deadline (2014)

=== Television ===
| Year | Title | Role |
|---|---|---|
| 2011 | Maalaala Mo Kaya: Bibliya | Myrna |
| 2012 | Precious Hearts Romances Presents: Hiyas | Giana |
| 2012 | Luna Blanca | Mariett |
| 2012–2013 | Magdalena: Anghel sa Putikan | Kim |
| 2013 | Bayan Ko | Eliza Bauer |
| 2013 | Cassandra: Warrior Angel | Camilla / Hunyango |
| 2013 | Katipunan | Teresa Magbanua |
| 2013 | Magpakailanman: Lola Putol: The Veronica Martinez Story | Helen |
| 2014–2015 | Ang Lihim ni Annasandra | Saling |
| 2015 | Karelasyon: Kasambahay | Jasmin |
| 2015 | Ningning | Evaporada "Eva" Herrera |
| 2016 | Saq Al Bamboo (The Bamboo Stalk) | Josephine |
| 2016–2017 | The Greatest Love | Greta Ramirez / Clarissa Ramirez |
| 2017 | FPJ's Ang Probinsyano | Aurora Dumaguit |
| 2017–2018 | Hanggang Saan | Carolina Dela Guerra |
| 2018 | Maalaala Mo Kaya: Bantay Bata | Esang |
| 2018 | Ngayon at Kailanman | Mia Bartolome |
| 2019 | The General's Daughter | Gabriela "Cinco" Sta. Ana |
| 2019 | Maalaala Mo Kaya: 600 Pesos | Jocelyn |
| 2019 | Ang Babae sa Septic Tank 3: The Real Untold Story of Josephine Bracken | Herself/Lucia Rizal |
| 2020 | A Soldier's Heart | |
| 2021 | Huwag Kang Mangamba | Agatha Delos Santos |
| 2022 | 2 Good 2 Be True | Abegail Rosales |
| 2023 | ReTox: 2 Be Continued | Teresa Baquiran |
| 2023–2025 | ASAP | Herself / co-host / Performer |
| 2023–2024 | FPJ's Batang Quiapo | Lena Cortez |
| 2025–2026 | Hating Kapatid | Melania Sarmiento |
| 2026 | Honor Thy Mother † | |

== Awards and nominations ==
Awards and nominations received by Mercedes Cabral
| Award (Note: Awards, festivals, honors and other miscellaneous organizations are listed in alphabetical order.) | Year (Note: Indicates the year of ceremony. Each year is linked to the article about the awards held that year, wherever possible.) | Recipient(s) | Category | Result | Ref. |
|---|---|---|---|---|---|
| Cinemalaya Independent Film Festival | 2013 | Transit | Best Acting Ensemble (Note: shared with Irma Adlawan, Jasmine Curtis-Smith, Ping Medina, Mercedes Cabral, and Marc Justine Alvarez) | Won | |
| Gawad Urian Awards | 2011 | Gayuma | Best Actress | Nominated | |
| Gawad Urian Awards | 2016 | Da Dog Show | Best Actress | Nominated | |
| Golden Screen Awards | 2012 | Ligo na Ü, Lapit na Me | Best Performance by an Actress in a Leading Role (Musical or Comedy) | Nominated | |
| Metro Manila Film Festival | 2016 | Oro | Best Supporting Actress | Nominated | |
| Metro Manila Film Festival | 2016 | Oro | Best Acting Ensemble | Won | |
| Star Awards for Movies | 2017 | Oro | Best Supporting Actress | Nominated | |
| World Premieres Film Festival | 2015 | An Kubo sa Kawayan | Best Performance by an Actress | Won | |
| Young Critics Circle | 2010 | Biyaheng Lupa | Best Performance | Nominated | |
| Young Critics Circle | 2016 | Da Dog Show | Best Performance | Nominated | |
| Young Critics Circle | 2016 | An Kubo sa Kawayan | Best Performance | Nominated | |
| Young Critics Circle | 2017 | Ma' Rosa | Best Performance | Nominated | |
