= Melvin Helitzer =

American author

- Occupations: Author, Professor
- Writing career
- Genres: Comedy, Sports Publicity

Melvin Helitzer (October 18, 1924 – April 11, 2009) was a professor in the E.W. Scripps School of Journalism at Ohio University, where he taught sports publicity, promotion and public relations in the university's graduate school of recreation and sports sciences.

== Biography ==
A former Madison Avenue advertising agency president, Helitzer left a Clio-award-winning career in 1980 to teach journalism courses, including "Humor Writing for Fun and Profit," at Ohio University in Athens, Ohio. That course became so popular that it boasted a sign-up list a year in advance, and each student had to audition to become one of the few selected for each class. Helitzer has written for newspapers, magazines, and commercials; for the award-winning ABC-TV musical comedy, "The Cowboy & The Tiger"; and for such professional entertainers as Sammy Davis Jr., Art Linkletter, and Shari Lewis. Through his college class he has helped launch the careers of numerous students including one who is now working for an off-Broadway playwright and others who have sold material to many professional comedians and national publications.

== Books ==
Helitzer's published books include:

The Dream Job: Sports Publicity, Promotion and Marketing, 1997

Comedy Techniques for Writers and Performers, 1994

Comedy Writing Secrets - How to Think Funny, Write Funny, Act Funny and Get Paid For It., 1992

Comedy Techniques for Writers and Performers, 1984

== Quotes ==
"I'd like to introduce a man with a lot of charm, talent, and wit. Unfortunately, he couldn't be here tonight, so instead..."

"I sort of feel like Cindy Crawford's new husband on their wedding night. I know what's expected of me. I'm just not sure I've got the ability to make it interesting."

"Enjoy how sweet, how thoughtful, how kind I'm being on your birthday. Because tomorrow it's back to the same old crap."

"When asked to contribute ten dollars to a lawyer's funeral, I said: "Here's fifty. Bury five of them."

"One thing I can guarantee you. You may not be a great deal wiser from my talk today, but you will be a great deal older."
