= 2013 Palanca Awards =

63rd edition of the annual Philippine literary award

63rd Palanca Awards
- Date: September 1, 2013
- Location: The Peninsula Manila, Makati, Philippines

The 63rd Don Carlos Palanca Memorial Awards for Literature was held on September 1, 2013, at The Peninsula Manila in Makati to commemorate the memory of Don Carlos Palanca Sr. through an endeavor that would promote education and culture in the country. The competition received more than 1,100 literary entries, and of the number, the judges picked 58 winning pieces. National Artist for Literature Cirilo F. Bautista was guest of honor and speaker at the awarding ceremony.

The winners are divided into four categories:

== English Division ==
=== Novel ===
Grand Prize: Jose Elvin Bueno, Subversivo, Inc.

=== Short Story ===
- First Prize: John Bengan, "Armor"
- Second Prize: Erlinda V Kravetz, "Krystal Hut"
- Third Prize: Lystra Aranal, "Ren"

=== Short Story for Children ===
- First Prize: Nadeth Rae E Rival, "Marvino's League of Superheroes"
- Second Prize: Cheeno Marlo Sayuno, "The Magic Bahag"
- Third Prize: Patricia Marie Grace S. Gomez, "A Thousand of Paper Cranes"

=== Poetry ===
- First Prize: Mikael de Lara Co, "Pastoral and Other Poems"
- Second Prize: Carlomar Arcangel Daoana, "Crown for Maria"
- Third Prize: Joy Anne Icayan, "Animal Experiments"

=== Poetry Written for Children ===
- First Prize: Mia A Buenaventura, "Attack of the Persistent Cold Virus and Other Poems"
- Second Prize: Francis C Macansantos, "Mr. Bully and Other Poems for Children"
- Third Prize: Kathleen Aton-Osias, "Monsters Under My Bed"

=== Essay ===
- First Prize: Shakira Andrea C. Sison, "The Krakauer Table"
- Second Prize: Laurel Anne Fantauzzo, "Under My Invisible Umbrella"
- Third Prize: Maria Neobie. G Gonzalez, "Voices from the Village"

=== One-Act Play ===
- First Prize: Allan B. Lopez, "Blue Eyes"
- Second Prize: Lystra Aranal, "Debrief"
- Third Prize: Danilo Nino Calalang, "Call of Duty"

=== Full-Length Play ===
- First Prize: Jay M. Crisostomo IV, "End of the Gallows"
- Second Prize: Mario L. Mendez Jr., "The Son of Ashes"
- Third Prize: Floy C. Quintos, "Collection"

== Filipino Division ==
=== Nobela ===
- Grand Prize: Eros Sanchez Atalia, Tatlong Gabi, Tatlong Araw

=== Maikling Kwento ===
- First Prize: Lilia Quindoza Santiago, "Bayanggudaw"
- Second Prize: Bernadette Villanueva Neri, "Pamamanhikan"
- Third Prize: Kristian Sendon Cordero, "Ad Astra per Aspera"

=== Maikling Kwentong Pambata ===
- First Prize: Maryrose Jairene C Cruz, "Ang Paglalakbay ni Pipoy Piso"
- Second Prize: Eugene Y Evasco and Chris Martinez, "Ang Singsing-Pari sa Pisara"
- Third Prize: Lucky Virgo Joyce Tinio, "Salusalo Para Kay Kuya"

=== Tula ===
- First Prize: Enrique S Villasis, "Manansala"
- Second Prize: Mark Anthony Angeles, "Asal-Hayop"
- Third Prize: Kristian Sendon Cordero, "Lobo sa Loob"

=== Tulang Pambata ===
- First Prize: Eugene Y Evasco, "Harana ng Kuliglig"
- Second Prize: April Jade I. Biglaen, "Family Tree ng Tumubo sa Anit"
- Third Prize: Alvin Capili Ursua, "Sisid"

=== Sanaysay ===
- First Prize: Kristian Sendon Cordero, "Our Lady of Imelda"
- Second Prize: Salvador T. Biglaen, "Gabay sa Gurong-Likod"
- Third Prize: Laurence Marvin S. Castillo, "Mga Birtwal na Karahasan"

=== Dulang May Isang Yugto ===
- First Prize: Miguel Antonio Alfredo V Luarca, "Mga Kuneho"
- Second Prize: George A de Jesus III, "Kapit"
- Third Prize: Bernadette Villanueva Neri, "Pamamanhikan"

=== Dulang Ganap ang Haba ===
- First Prize: No Winner
- Second Prize: No Winner
- Third Prize: Luciano Sonny O. Valencia, "Dhahran Queens Manila"

=== Dulang Pampelikula ===
- First Prize: No Winner
- Second Prize: George A de Jesus III, "Kung Paano Maghiwalay"
- Third Prize: Patrick John R. Valencia, "The Revenge of the Comfort Woman"

== Regional Division ==
=== Short Story [Cebuano] ===
- First Prize: Jona Branzuela Bering, "Tubod"
- Second Prize: Richel G Dorotan, "Ang Batang Tamsi"
- Third Prize: Noel P Tuazon, "Padre Botox"

=== Short Story [Hiligaynon] ===
- First Prize: Peter Solis Nery, "Si Padre Olan Kag Ang Dios"
- Second Prize: Norman Tagudinay Darap, "Ulubrahon"
- Third Prize: Alice Tan Gonzales, "Torbik"

=== Short Story [Iluko] ===
- First Prize: No Winner
- Second Prize: Danilo B Antalan, "Bagnos Payegpeg Beterano"
- Third Prize: Gorgonia B Serrano, "Ti Palimed Ni Katugangak"

== Kabataan Division ==
=== Kabataan Essay ===
- First Prize: Marc Christian M. Lopez, "Hymns of the Mountains, Dreams of the Stars"
- Second Prize: Vicah Adrienne P. Villanueva, "Panacea"
- Third Prize: Pauline Samantha B Sagayo, "Manifesto of Literature"

=== Kabataan Sanaysay ===
- First Prize: Rowin C. de Leon, "Ang Alamat ng Batang Manunulat"
- Second Prize: Annette Irina C. Tanlimco, "Pagkatok Ng Dumagundong Na Manok sa Umaga"
- Third Prize: Rajee S. Florido, "Deus Ex Machina: Sapagkat Tayo ay Bulag Pa"
