= Cinemalaya =

Film festival in the Philippines

Cinemalaya Philippine Independent Film Festival
- Location: Metro Manila, Philippines
- Founded: 2005
- Most recent: 2025 Cinemalaya
- Awards: 2025 Cinemalaya
- Hosted by: Cinemalaya Foundation Inc.
- No. of films: 10 feature films
- Language: English, Filipino, and other Philippine languages
- Website: www.cinemalaya.org

The Cinemalaya Philippine Independent Film Festival, more commonly known as Cinemalaya, is a film festival in the Philippines held annually traditionally at the Cultural Center of the Philippines Complex as well as well as other select cinemas since 2011.

Established in 2005, Cinemalaya's aim is the development and promotion of Filipino independent films. The film festival is organized by the Cinemalaya Foundation, Inc. with the support of the Cultural Center of the Philippines and Econolink Investments, Inc.

The organizing committee, headed by veteran Filipino director and actress Laurice Guillen, oversees the production of the films and the festival.

== History ==
The Cinemalaya Philippine Independent Film Festival is a film competition and festival that supports Filipino filmmakers. Cinemalaya's first edition was held in 2005 with the main competition meant for filmmakers who have made less than three commercial feature films. It also began with a short film competition. The organization of Cinemalaya was first proposed as early as 2004. The Cultural Center of the Philippines (CCP) is among the original main proponents of Cinemalaya.

The Cinemalaya's traditional main venue has been the CCP Complex in Pasay.

In 2010, the festival was opened to veteran filmmakers under the Directors Showcase competition with the main competition branded as the New Breed category. The Directors Showcase lasted until the 2014 edition.

Entrant films began concurrently screening in select Ayala Malls cinemas starting the 2011 edition.

From its inception in 2005 until the 2013 edition, Cinemalaya was held annually in July. The schedule was moved to August in 2014 to avoid competition from "big Hollywood films".

Only short films was featured in the 2015 edition. The main competition was revived in the 2016 edition with the short film competition being the only other category.

Cinemalaya was held virtually for the first time in 2020 due to the COVID-19 pandemic. It was held online again in the next year. Both editions focused on short films. The film festival returned to on-site screenings in the 2022 edition.

From the 2023 edition due to the due to renovation work of the CCP complex, the main venue of the Cinemalaya has been moved elsewhere within Metro Manila. It is projected that Cinemalaya will only be able to return to the CCP Complex in 2028 at earliest.

By 2025, Cinemalaya faced financial difficulties with the 2025 edition "streamlined" due to reduced funding from the CCP which is still renovating its complex. The schedule was also shifted to October from August. Fortunately, The 21st Cinemalaya Independent Film Festival took place in October 2025 in Metro Manila, showcasing Filipino independent films. The festival was shifted from August to October and streamlined due to funding changes, with events held at Shangri-La Plaza in Mandaluyong.

== Ceremonies ==
Festival	Year	Awards Show		Ref.
Festival	Year	Venue	City	Ref.
1st	2005	Cultural Center of the Philippines Complex	Pasay	
2nd	2006	Cultural Center of the Philippines Complex	Pasay	
3rd	2007	Cultural Center of the Philippines Complex	Pasay	
4th	2008	Cultural Center of the Philippines Complex	Pasay	
5th	2009	Cultural Center of the Philippines Complex	Pasay	
6th	2010	Cultural Center of the Philippines Complex	Pasay	
7th	2011	Cultural Center of the Philippines Complex	Pasay	
8th	2012	Cultural Center of the Philippines Complex	Pasay	
9th	2013	Cultural Center of the Philippines Complex	Pasay	
10th	2014	Cultural Center of the Philippines Complex	Pasay	
11th	2015	Cultural Center of the Philippines Complex	Pasay	
12th	2016	Cultural Center of the Philippines Complex	Pasay	
13th	2017	Cultural Center of the Philippines Complex	Pasay	
14th	2018	Cultural Center of the Philippines Complex	Pasay	
15th	2019	Cultural Center of the Philippines Complex	Pasay	
16th	2020	Online		
17th	2021	Online		
18th	2022	Cultural Center of the Philippines Complex	Pasay	
19th	2023	Philippine International Convention Center	Pasay	
20th	2024	Shangri-La Plaza	Mandaluyong	
21st	2025	Shangri-La Plaza	Mandaluyong	
22nd	2026	Shangri-La Plaza	Mandaluyong	

== Funding ==
Each director receives a seed grant to produce their feature films. In the early years, each received a grant of ₱500 thousand. In the 2023 edition, filmmakers received a record high grant of ₱2 million each.

== Competitions ==
- Main competition – known as the New Breed category from 2010 to 2014 is the primary competition for Cinemalaya for new Filipino filmmakers
- Director's Showcase – Held from 2010 to 2014, the competition was open to veteran filmmakers
- Short film competition – category for short film submissions. The 2015, 2020, and 2021 editions solely held the short film competitions.
