= Makapiling Kang Muli =

2012 Philippine television drama series

- Title card
- Also known as: Together Again
- Genre: Romantic drama
- Created by: Des Garbes-Severino
- Written by: Rona Sales; Jules Katanyag; John Kenneth de Leon
- Directed by: Ricky Davao
- Creative director: Jun Lana
- Starring: Richard Gutierrez; Carla Abellana
- Theme music composer: Ogie Alcasid
- Opening theme: "Hanggang Ngayon" by Kyla & Mark Bautista
- Country of origin: Philippines
- Original language: Tagalog
- No. of episodes: 70

Production
- Executive producer: Michele R. Borja
- Producer: Lilybeth G. Rasonable
- Production locations: Laguna, Philippines; Batangas, Philippines; Ilocos, Philippines
- Cinematography: Joe Tutanes
- Camera setup: Multiple-camera setup
- Running time: 30–45 minutes
- Production company: GMA Entertainment TV

Original release
- Network: GMA Network
- Release: June 4 – September 7, 2012

Makapiling Kang Muli (transl. to be with you again / international title: Together Again) is a 2012 Philippine television drama romance series broadcast by GMA Network. Directed by Ricky Davao, it stars Richard Gutierrez and Carla Abellana. It premiered on June 4, 2012 on the network's Telebabad line up. The series concluded on September 7, 2012, with a total of 70 episodes.

It was originally titled as Rancho Paradiso. The series is streaming online on YouTube.

== Cast and characters ==
Cast

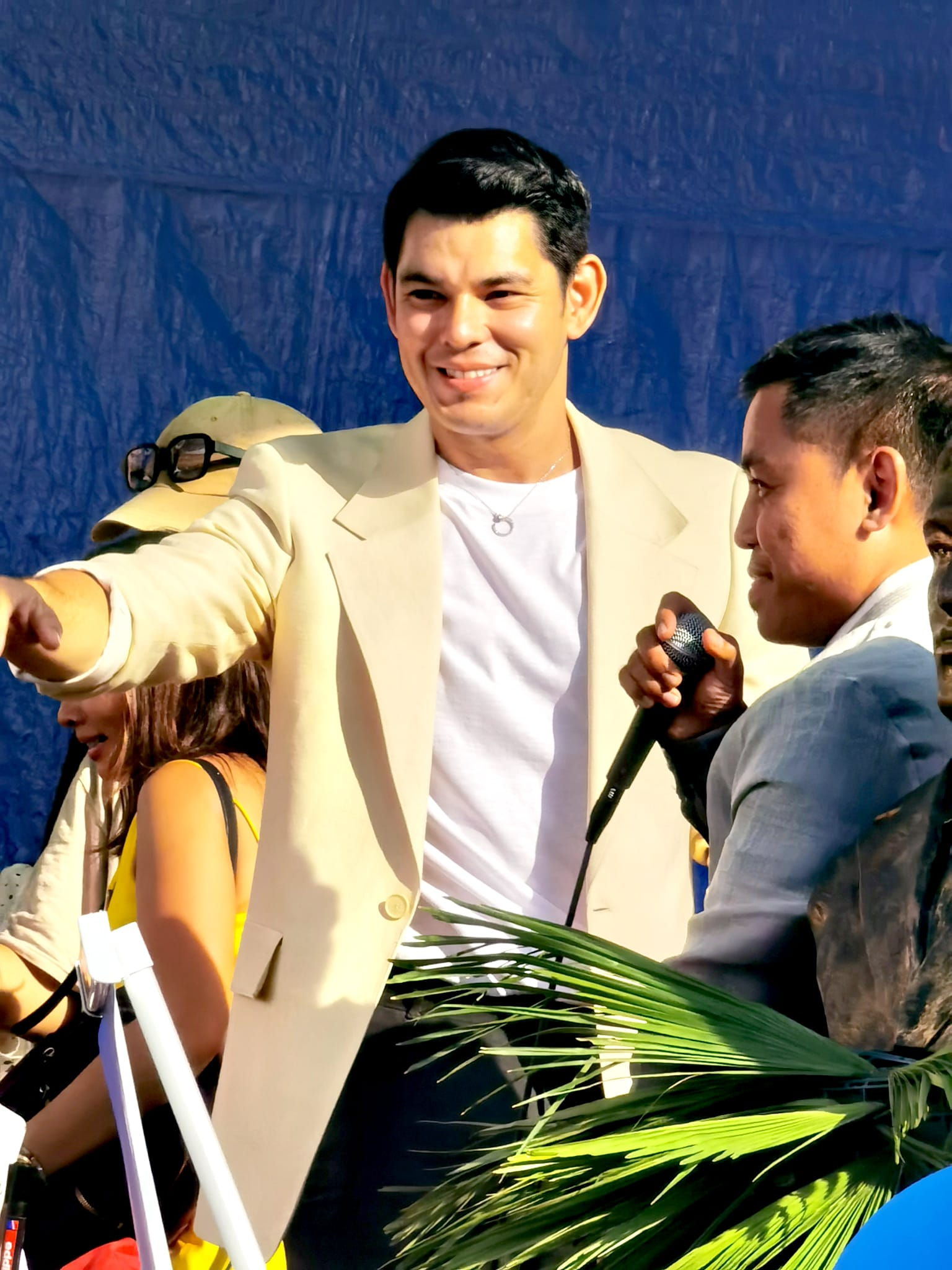
Richard Gutierrez

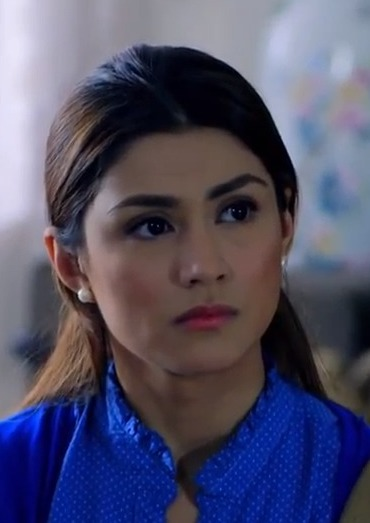
Carla Abellana

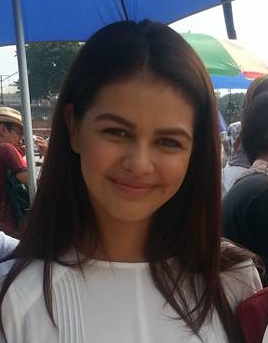
Janine Gutierrez

Lead cast

- Richard Gutierrez as Martín Caballero-De La Rosa-Silvestre
- Carla Abellana as Leilani Angeles

Supporting cast

- Mark Anthony Fernandez as Luisito "Louie" Valencia
- Sarah Lahbati as Graciela Montes
- Gloria Romero as Soledad Vda. de Silvestre-Caballero
- Rio Locsin as Mara Silvestre-Valencia
- Phillip Salvador as Amadeo Perez
- Mark Gil as Roman Valencia
- Robert Arevalo as Florentino "Tino" Caballero
- TJ Trinidad as Javier Lagdameo
- John Lapus as George
- Janine Gutierrez as Lynley Valencia
- Benedict Campos as Keiffer Angeles

Guest cast

- Lance Lucido as younger Martin Caballero
- Miguel Tanfelix as younger Martin Caballero
- Anna Vicente as younger Leilani Angeles
- Ronald de Santos as younger Luisito "Louie" Valencia
- Jennylyn Mercado as younger Mara Silvestre-Valencia
- Gabby Eigenmann as younger Roman Valencia
- Jestoni Alarcon as Serafín Angeles
- Lani Mercado as Nelia Angeles
- James Blanco as Emilio dela Rosa
- Dex Quindoza as Buboy
- Carmen Soriano as Claring Perez
- Lito Legaspi as a governor
- Bearwin Meily as Dexter
- Rita Avila as Olivia
- Yassi Pressman as Vanessa
- Rocco Nacino as Ferdinand
- Rocky Gutierrez as Brando
- Ramon Christopher as Bartolome
- Bela Padilla as Amber
- Paolo Paraiso as Bodjie
- Vaness del Moral as Salve
- Rosemarie Sarita as George's mother
- Carmi Martin as Helga
- Nathalie Hart as Monina
- Lester Llansang as Hans
- Andrew Schimmer as Kyle Dancel
- Marc Justine Alvarez as Macmac
- Sheree Bautista as Ara
- Mike Lloren as Rodriguez
- Robert Ortega as Durano

== Development ==
Actor and director, Ricky Davao was hired to direct the series. Davao is confident that the series can establish supremacy on primetime television as it boasts quality in terms of story and performance. He further stated:

"We're very proud of our work in this project. This is not a typical soap opera. The twists and turns in the plot and the character presentation will be enough to glue televiewers till the end. Everyone gave his best."

—

=== Casting ===
The series' producer cast two of the network's primetime royalties, Richard Gutierrez and Carla Abellana as Martin Caballero and Leilani Angeles, respectively, the two main protagonists of the series. The former expresses his gratitude on doing this project. For him, this drama is one of the biggest milestones in his career and a "something new" for him [the actor is associated with his top-rated fantasy-adventure series like Mulawin, Sugo, Captain Barbell, Lupin, Kamandag and Zorro] and for the audience. According to Gutierrez, the entire cast prepared hard for this series and underwent trainings and workshops before filming.

Gloria Romero plays the villainess, Soledad Silvestre. It was her first time to do an "anti-hero" role, and said that the role is very different from her goody-good role in the drama series Munting Heredera. She stated "When they gave me the role as Senyora Soledad, I immediately liked it! It is far from other roles I did in my past television series. I said, yes [to them] quickly! It is a huge challenge for me. I love these kind of roles", she added.

Comedian John Lapus plays support to Gutierrez, which he doesn't really mind even after recently receiving his second Actor of the Year award from the Guillermo Mendoza Scholarship Foundation (2012). He further stated:

On director Ricky Davao, it is his first time to direct most of the lead stars of the series except for Sarah Lahbati, whom he previously handled in the afternoon drama-fantasy series, Kokak. Here, however, Lahbati is portraying someone totally different from her shy-girl screen persona. She's now playing an assertive seductress who tries to steal Gutierrez's character away from his leading lady (Abellana). Davao added... "The good thing about Sarah is that she knows what she wants. And she works hard."

On his strategy in handling big stars like Gutierrez and Abellana, the director said that he just talk to them and get to know their likes, dislikes, fears, limitations, strengths and weaknesses as actors. He further stated that he is impressed by Abellana's growth as an actress. He worked with her as co-star in the drama series Kung Aagawin Mo Ang Langit. "She has matured a lot from her first soap, Rosalinda", he added.

== Production ==
Principal photography commenced on May 7, 2012. The series' creator, Des Garbes Severino, who also served as the head writer, creative director, Jun Lana, Michele Borja as the executive producer of the show, and Lilybeth G. Rasonable headed as the over-all in charge of the production. Filming concluded on August 29, 2012.

== Reception ==
=== Ratings ===
According to AGB Nielsen Philippines' Mega Manila household television ratings, the pilot episode of Makapiling Kang Muli earned a 24% rating. The final episode scored a 24.8% rating.

=== Critical response ===
Blog writer, Nestor Silvestre complimented the series on its high production value and the ensemble's acting. "The scenes in the Jailhouse with Richard were also beyond my expectations, they effortlessly pulled off fight scenes, dangerous motorcycle stunts, bombings and blasting and most especially the camera shots really gave me the feeling that I was like in a movie house watching a legit action film"...he stated.

== Accolades ==
Accolades received by Makapiling Kang Muli
Year	Award	Category	Recipient	Result	Ref.
2013	10th Golden Screen TV Awards	Outstanding Supporting Actor in a Drama Series	John Lapus	Nominated	
2013	10th Golden Screen TV Awards	Outstanding Breakthrough Performance by an Actress	Janine Gutierrez	Nominated	
