= Tom Rodriguez =

Filipino actor

- Born: Bartolome Alberto Mott; October 1, 1987 (age 39); Subic Naval Base, Zambales, Philippines
- Citizenship: United States
- Occupations: Actor; model; singer; TV host
- Years active: 2009–2022; 2024–present
- Agents: Star Magic (2009–2014); Sparkle (2014–2022; 2024–present)
- Known for: Pinoy Big Brother: Double Up; Joey Gosiengfiao's Temptation Island; My Husband's Lover; My Destiny
- Height: 1.81 m (5 ft 11 in)
- Spouse: Carla Abellana (m. 2021; div. 2024)
- Children: 1

Bartolome Alberto Mott (born October 1, 1987), known professionally as Tom Rodriguez (Tagalog pronunciation: [ɾɔˈdɾigɛs]), is a Filipino actor who started and rose his career after leaving the reality TV show Pinoy Big Brother: Double Up. As of 2025, he is currently an exclusive talent of GMA Network and GMA Pictures based on Kapuso Profile from GMA Network official website.

== Personal life ==
Rodriguez is from Catbalogan, Samar. He was born in Subic Naval Base in Zambales to an American serviceman father and a Filipina mother. One of six siblings, he moved with his two brothers and three sisters with their mother to Pinabacdao, Samar (where their mother hails from). But they grew up in nearby Catbalogan, also in Samar, where Rodriguez studied at St. Mary's College of Catbalogan (formerly Sacred Heart College) from kindergarten to elementary. They later migrated to the United States when he was 12 years old with his parents. He lived in Arizona and attended Cibola High School in Yuma. Then the family moved to San Francisco where he took up Digital Animation, but found it hard to find a job there. Rodriguez speaks English, Tagalog and Waray-Waray.

=== Relationships and marriage ===
Rodriguez and Carla Abellana, who were engaged in October 2020, married in October 2021. In June 2022, the marriage was dissolved by a United States decree, which was confirmed by the Philippine courts in June 2024.

In September 2024, Rodriguez revealed being a father of a four-month-old baby boy with his non-showbiz girlfriend.

== Career and acting ==
After his eviction from Pinoy Big Brother: Double Up, he signed under Star Magic and took the stage name Tom Rodriguez. He made his television debut in Precious Hearts Romances Presents: My Cheating Heart.

In 2010, Rodriguez had a small role in an episode of Maalaala Mo Kaya with Angel Locsin. He and his fellow Pinoy Big Brother: Double Up housemates were cast in Your Song's summer episode Isla. He later played the love interest of Valerie Concepcion in Precious Hearts Romances Presents: Love Me Again. He also joined all male-singing group VoizBoys replacing Ronnie Liang, who was pulled out from the group because he has an existing contract to do an album as a solo artist. He made his film debut in Here Comes the Bride and later appeared in the film Petrang Kabayo.

Later in 2011, Rodriguez was cast in the film Joey Gosiengfiao's Temptation Island in 1980 where he gained his fame, success and the key to him having a great career ahead of him. The film was released in July 2011 and made it to the box office hitting 60 million. Rodriguez's character pairing with GMA artist Marian Rivera played as one of the sexy and glamorous roles in the movie that had explicitly. He played the new version of Umberto that made him being one of the new twist in story from the old film as a server on an exclusive luxurious yacht shot in the beautiful scenic Manila Bay. Marian Rivera's character (Christina G.) played as the seductive girlfriend tempting Umberto later in the movie.

He recently played Simon Escalante in TV5's teen series My Driver Sweet Lover. Rodriguez appeared in the ABS-CBN's hit drama series Angelito: Batang Ama as a regular. In the year 2012, he appeared in the movie The Reunion and in the hit daytime soap Be Careful with My Heart. He plays Jeff Macavinta as the father of Aiza Seguerra's character, Cristina Rose's son, Pocholo.

In 2013, Rodriguez left Be Careful with My Heart then later played one of the leading roles in My Husband's Lover.

In 2014, he portrayed the role of Lucas Matthew Andrada in the television drama series My Destiny, opposite Carla Abellana, whom he first worked with in My Husband's Lover. That year, Rodriguez hostee the local franchise of the German game show Don't Lose the Money.

In 2015, Rodriguez portrayed Sergio in the second Philippine adaptation of the hit Televisa Mexicanovela Marimar opposite Megan Young.

== Theater ==
In 2012, Rodriguez played the titular character of Meralco Theater's Aladdin.

== Filmography ==
=== Film ===
Year	Title	Role	Notes	Ref.
2010	Here Comes the Bride	Harold	Special participation	
2010	Petrang Kabayo	Chito	Recurring role	
2010	Ang Tanging Ina Mo: Last Na 'To!	Actor shooting of the Angel	Special participation	
2011	Joey Gosiengfiao's Temptation Island	Umberto		
2012	The Reunion	Aljoven		
2013	It Takes a Man and a Woman	Anton Ortega		
2013	The Bride and the Lover			
2013	My Lady Boss	Timothy		
2013	Ekstra	Himself/Rafael	International title: The Bit Player	
2013	Gaydar	Richard		
2013	Bekikang: Ang Nanay Kong Beki	Fortunato		
2014	So It's You	Goryo Acuyong		
2014	Beauty in a Bottle	Pocholo		
2014	T'yanak	Mark		
2014	The Amazing Praybeyt Benjamin	Janjaranjan	Official for the 40th Metro Manila Film Festival Entry	
2014	English Only, Please	Ernest	Special Participation; Official for the 40th Metro Manila Film Festival Entry	
2015	The Love Affair	Ryan		
2015	No Boyfriend Since Birth	Carlo Mercado		
2016	Magtanggol			
2018	The Significant Other	Edward		
2018	Abay Babes	Zack Xavier		
2019	Maledicto	Father Xavi		
2022	The Last Five Years			
2024	Huwag Mo 'Kong Iwan	Edwin		
2025	Unmarry	Stephen	Official for the 51st Metro Manila Film Festival Entry	

=== Television ===
Year	Title	Role	Notes	Ref.
2009	Pinoy Big Brother: Double Up	Himself / Housemate	Forced eviction (Day 41)	
2009–2010	Precious Hearts Romances Presents: My Cheating Heart	Harry		
2010	Maalaala Mo Kaya	Mike	Episode: "Litrato"	
2010	Your Song Presents: Isla	Tom		
2010	Precious Hearts Romances Presents: Love Me Again	Chadilton "Chad" Barrera		
2010	M3: Malay Mo Ma-develop	Ted Salazar		
2010–2011	My Driver Sweet Lover	Simon Escalante		
2011	Maalaala Mo Kaya	Bong	Episode: "School ID"	
2011	Precious Hearts Romances Presents: Mana Po	Johnny Santos		
2011	Guns and Roses	Young Lucio		
2011	Maalaala Mo Kaya	Noli	Episode: "Niagara Falls"	
2011–2012	Angelito: Batang Ama	Andrew Posadas		
2012	Maalaala Mo Kaya	Chiz Escudero	Episode: "Singsing"	
2012–2013	Be Careful With My Heart	Jeffrey "Jeff" D. Macavinta		
2013	Maalaala Mo Kaya	Ian	Episode: "Palda"	
2013	My Husband's Lover	Vicente "Vincent" Soriano		
2013–2015	Sunday All Stars	Himself (host / performer)		
2014	Niño	Gabriel Manalastas		
2014	My Destiny	Lucas Matthew Andrada		
2014	Don't Lose the Money	Himself (host)		
2015–2016	Marimar	Sergio Santibañez		
2015–2016	Ismol Family	Mac-Mac		
2015–2016	Celebrity Bluff	Himself (guest)		
2016	Asia's Next Top Model Cycle 4	Himself (guest)		
2016	Karelasyon			
2016	Dear Uge	Mark		
2016–2017	Someone to Watch Over Me	Teodoro Jose "TJ" Chavez		
2017	Wagas	Satur Ocampo	Episode: "Love in the Time of Martial Law"	
2017	Mulawin vs. Ravena	Rodrigo		
2017	I Heart Davao	Ponce Torres		
2018	The Cure	Gregory "Greg" Salvador		
2019	Dragon Lady	Michael Chan		
2020	Love of My Life	Stefano Gonzales		
2020	I Can See You	Luisito "Luis" Alvarez	Episode: "High-Rise Lovers"	
2021–2022	All-Out Sundays	Himself (host / performer)		
2021–2022	The World Between Us	Brian Delgado Libradilla		
2024	Magpakailanman	Bryan Benedict	Episode: "A Mother to Remember"	
2024–2025	Lilet Matias: Attorney-at-Law	Atty. Reynante “Renan” Alon		
2025–2026	Encantadia Chronicles: Sang'gre	Bathalang Gargan		
2026–present	The Master Cutter	Oscar "Oca" Asuncion		
TBA	Whispers from Heaven			

== Discography ==
=== Studio albums ===
VoizBoys

Year	Album	Certifications (sales thresholds)
2010	Fusion: Released: May 2010; Label: Quantum Music, Star Records; Format: CD, digital download	PARI:

TomDen

Year	Album	Certifications (sales thresholds)
2008	TomDen: Released: October 2013; Label: GMA Records; Format: CD, digital download	PARI: Gold

== Accolades ==
Year	Work	Award	Category	Result	Ref.
2013	My Husband's Lover	27th PMPC Star Awards for TV	Best Drama Actor	Nominated	
2013	My Husband's Lover	ENPRESS Golden Screen TV Awards	Best Performance by an Actor in a Drama Series	Nominated	
