= Sheree Bautista =

Filipina actress, singer, dancer, model, painter

Sheree
- Born: Cherry Hazel Vidal Agustin; April 20, 1980 (age 45); Cagayan de Oro, Philippines
- Occupations: Actress; singer; dancer; model; painter
- Children: 1

Cherry Hazel Sweet Faye Vidal Bautista (born April 20, 1980), popularly known as Sheree, is a Filipino actress, singer, dancer, model, and painter.

Born in Cagayan de Oro and raised in Bukidnon, she is a former member of Viva Hot Babes. She is a cousin of Jinky Vidal, formerly of Freestyle, and a distant relative of Mark Bautista.

Sheree has a son with theater actor and singer Gian Magdangal whom she is separated with.

== Filmography ==
=== Television / Digital Series ===
Year	Title	Role
2002	Habang Kapiling Ka	Magnolia
2007	Kemis: Ke Misis Umaasa	Armi
2007	Lupin	Virgin
2008	Codename: Asero	Agent Malta (Codename: Tiger Lady)
2008–2009	Luna Mystika	Engkanto
2009	Rosalinda	Natalia
2010–2011	Imortal	Young Lucille Zaragoza
2011	Iglot	Gardo's wife
2012	Makapiling Kang Muli	Ara
2012	My Beloved	Tikyo's girlfriend
2016	Juan Happy Love Story	Lucy
2016	Karelasyon	Casey
2016	A1 Ko Sa 'Yo	Beverly Reyes
2016	Oh, My Mama!	Patricia Ynares
2017	Pinulot Ka Lang sa Lupa	Arlene Garela-Alejo
2017	Road Trip	Herself / Guest
2017	Encantadia	Hera Odessa
2017–2018	Kambal, Karibal	Lilian Ocampo
2018–2019	Kadenang Ginto	Jessa Trinidad
2020	Bawal na Game Show	Herself / Contestant
2022	Flower of Evil	Monet Dimayuga
2023	Sex Games	Debbie
2024	Black Rider	Dolores†
2025	Rainbow Rumble	Herself / Contestant
2026	House of Lies	Jenny Duque
