= No Boyfriend Since Birth =

- Theatrical movie poster
- Directed by: Jose Javier Reyes
- Written by: Noreen Capili
- Produced by: Lily Monteverde; Roselle Monteverde
- Starring: Carla Abellana; Tom Rodriguez
- Cinematography: Patrick Layugan
- Edited by: Benjamin Tolentino
- Music by: Jesse Lucas
- Production companies: Regal Entertainment; Regal Multimedia, Inc.
- Distributed by: Regal Entertainment
- Release date: November 11, 2015
- Country: Philippines
- Languages: Filipino; English
- Box office: ₱50,638,488.00

No Boyfriend Since Birth (NBSB) is a 2015 Filipino romantic-comedy film, directed by Jose Javier Reyes starring GMA's exclusive actors Carla Abellana and Tom Rodriguez. The film was released on November 11, 2015.

This film served as the comeback of TomCar love team after their 2014 romantic film So It's You from Regal Films and GMA Network and their 2014 television series My Destiny from GMA Network.

== Synopsis ==
10 years after graduation, Carina meets again her high school crush Carlo at a wedding event. Carina "Carrie", an executive assistant in a bridal shop is eager to win Carlo, a charming businessman, despite having no boyfriend since birth. She devices several attempts to get his attention in hopes to have him.

== Cast ==
=== Main cast ===
- Carla Abellana as Carina "Carrie" Miranda
- Tom Rodriguez as Carlo Mercado

=== Supporting cast ===
- Mike Tan as Paolo
- Mylene Dizon as Mimi
- Bangs Garcia as Hannah
- Ricci Chan as Glenn
- Al Tantay as Celso
- Arlene Muhlach as Sonia
- Cindy Miranda as Rachel
- Shine Kuk as Sheila
- Luke Conde as Francis

== See also ==
- List of Filipino films in 2015
- List of Philippine films based on Wattpad stories
