= Jackie Lou Blanco =

Filipino actress

- Born: Jacqueline Lourdes Corrales Blanco; February 11, 1964 (age 62); Cebu City, Cebu, Philippines
- Occupations: Actress, television host
- Years active: 1982–present
- Agent: Freelancer
- Spouse: Ricky Davao (m. 1989; died 2025)
- Children: 3
- Parent(s): Pilita Corrales; Gonzalo Blanco
- Relatives: Ramon Christopher Gutierrez (half-brother)

Jacqueline Lourdes "Jackie Lou" Corrales Blanco (born February 11, 1964) is a Filipino freelance actress. During the 1980s and the 1990s, she appeared in different film genres including Hihintayin Kita sa Langit, (1991), Si Aida, Si Lorna, o Si Fe, (1989) Misis Mo, Misis Ko, (1988) and Palabra de Honor (1983).

== Career ==
Blanco co-hosted the noontime show Student Canteen on GMA Network from 1982 until the show's cancellation in 1986. She was also a regular fixture on the Sunday musical extravaganza GMA Supershow on the same network. In 1999, she became a household name when she played the main antagonist in the ABS-CBN primetime drama series Saan Ka Man Naroroon. Her television appearances include a regular co-hosting stint in Walang Tulugan from 2008 to 2016, and the sitcom Vampire ang Daddy Ko, where she and her mother Pilita Corrales alternated for the role of Sonya Ventura as the older/younger versions.

In June 2007, she enrolled in the Associate of Arts program of the University of the Philippines, Open University. Blanco wrote a column in The Philippine Star newspaper.

Since the 2000s, she has remained frequent with GMA-7 in afternoon and primetime dramas.

== Personal life ==
Blanco is the daughter of singer and actress Pilita Corrales. She has a half-brother named Ramon Christopher Gutierrez.

She married actor Ricky Davao in 1989; however, in 2023, she confirmed that they had already separated. They have three children, including actress Arabella Davao.

== Filmography ==
=== Television ===
==== Television programs ====
Year	Title	Role(s)	Source
1978–1997	GMA Supershow	Herself / Co-host	
1982–1986	Student Canteen	Herself / Co-host	
1995–1998	Katok Mga Misis	Herself / Reliever of Ali Sotto or Arnell Ignacio	
2001–2006	Unang Hirit: Feel Good with J-Lou Segment	Herself / Fitness segment host	
2007	U Can Dance 2.0	Herself / Celebrity judge	
2008	Walang Tulugan with the Master Showman	Herself / Co-host	
2016	Istorya	Herself / Lead host	
2016	Celebrity Bluff	Herself / Contestant	
2025	Rainbow Rumble	Herself / Contestant	

==== Television series ====
Year	Title	Role(s)	Source
1995–1996	Kadenang Kristal	Gemma	
1997–1999	Esperanza	Monica de Dios / Monica Pedrosa	
1997–1999	Del Tierro	Chanda	
1999–2001	Saan Ka Man Naroroon	Violeta Sarmeniego-Antonino	
2002–2003	Ang Iibigin ay Ikaw	Sabrina Villadolid	
2003	Ang Iibigin ay Ikaw Pa Rin	Sabrina Villadolid	
2004–2005	Joyride	Aurora	
2006	Hongkong Flight 143		
2006–2007	Mars Ravelo's Captain Barbell	Sandra Magtanggol	
2007	Sine Novela: Sinasamba Kita	Sylvia Ferrer	
2008	Volta	Black Hola Hola	
2008	Sine Novela: Pablo S. Gomez's Magdusa Ka	Olivia Doilente	
2008–2009	LaLola	Griselda Lobregat	
2009	Ang Babaeng Hinugot sa Aking Tadyang	Fake Celina Valdez	
2009	Sine Novela: Kung Aagawin Mo ang Lahat sa Akin	Doña Clara Andrada	
2009	Rosalinda	Veronica Salvador-Altamirano	
2010	Claudine: Ina-Inahan Anak-Anakan	Dra	
2010	Sine Novela: Mars Ravelo's Basahang Ginto	Elaine Vergara	
2011	Dwarfina	Dita Abiana	
2011	Elena M. Patron's Blusang Itim	Esmeralda Lopez-Santiago	
2012	Legacy	Isabel Calcetas-Aragon	
2012	Kasalanan Bang Ibigin Ka?	Lalaine Santiago	
2012	Together Forever	Evelyn Trinidad	
2013	Indio	Señora Victoria Hidalgo-de Sanreal	
2013–2016	Vampire ang Daddy Ko	Young Sonya Ventura	
2013	Genesis	Ramona Victoria Escalabre	
2014	Rhodora X	lawyer	
2014–2015	Hiram na Alaala	Regina Legazpi	
2015	Pari 'Koy	Kokoy's Mother	
2015	Baker King	Irene Lee	
2015–2016	Destiny Rose	Maria Dahlia Flores	
2015–2016	Dangwa	Veronica Arguentes	
2015	Karelasyon: Apartment	Donna	
2016	Because of You	Lucille Rodriguez	
2016–2017	Someone to Watch Over Me	Cielo Andrada-Chavez	
2017	Destined to be Yours	Ramona Villanueva	
2017	Daig Kayo ng Lola Ko	Lady Tremaine	
2017–2018	Super Ma'am	Greta Segovia	
2018	Hindi Ko Kayang Iwan Ka	Elvira Imperial-Policarpio	
2019	Inagaw na Bituin	Regina Lopez	
2019–2020	The Gift	Doctor Ortiz	
2021	Owe My Love	Divina Advincula	
2021	Magpakailanman: Sa Puso at Isipan		
2022	I Can See You: AlterNate	Carmencita "Cita" David	
2022	Magpakailanman: My Bipolar Mom		
2022	Start-Up PH	Cassandra "Sandra" Castillejos-Yoon	
2022	Regal Studio Presents: Mother of the Groom	Eva	
2023	Luv Is: Love at First Read	Truly Seriozo-Pereseo	
2023	Love Before Sunrise	Amparo Montelibano	
2023	Tadhana: Secrets	Alice	
2024	Jose & Maria's Bonggang Villa 2.0	Rebecca Fortez	
2024	Abot-Kamay na Pangarap	Leticia "Lotus" Madrigal	
2024–2025	Widows' War	Ruth Balay	
2025	Totoy Bato	Ivory	
2025	Tropang G.O.A.T.	Mommy Ginny	
2026	House of Lies	Regina Torrecampo	
2026	Magpakailanman: Viral Yaya	Aling Bing	
2026	The Master Cutter	Julie Padua	
2026	Pepito Manaloto		
2026	Tadhana: Ang Manugang	Alma	

==== Television specials ====
Year	Title	Role(s)
August 19, 1995	Hope & Winston ₱ 100 Million Superstakes 1st Grand Draw	Host
December 31, 1999 – January 1, 2000	ABS-CBN Worldwide Celebration of the New Millennium	Host

=== Film ===
Year	Title	Role	Source
1982	My Only Love	Trixie	
1983	Palabra de Honor	Sylvia	
1987	Kung Aagawin Mo ang Lahat sa Akin	Gladys Andrada	
1988	Misis Mo, Misis Ko	Cynthia Villanueva	
1988	Isusumbong Kita sa Diyos		
1991	Hihintayin Kita sa Langit	Sandra	
1996	Magic Temple	Ravenal	
2006	All About Love	Mrs. Villanueva	
2007	Ouija	Raquel (Ruth's Mother)	
2010	Working Girls	Maura Abesamis	
2010	Shake, Rattle and Roll 12: Mamanyika	Gail	
2012	A Secret Affair	Catelyn "Cate" Montinola	
2013	Alfredo S. Lim (The Untold Story)	Mother Superior	
2013	My Lady Boss	Diana	
2014	Trophy Wife	Sally	
2015	Your Place or Mine?	Amanda Saavedra	
2015	Para sa Hopeless Romantic	Nikko's Mother	
2015	Chain Mail	Tessie	
2016	Bob Ong's Lumayo Ka Nga Sa Akin: Asawa ni Marie	Señorita Onor	
2023	Five Breakups and a Romance	Maggie	
2023	Family of Two	Mrs. Odette Ignacio	
2025	P77	Sonia	
2026	The Loved One	Evelyn	
