= List of Someone to Watch Over Me episodes =

Someone to Watch Over Me is a 2016 Philippine television drama romance series broadcast by GMA Network. It premiered on the network's Telebabad line up and worldwide on GMA Pinoy TV from September 5, 2016, to January 6, 2017, replacing Juan Happy Love Story.

Urban Luzon and NUTAM (Nationwide Urban Television Audience Measurement) ratings are provided by AGB Nielsen Philippines.

== Series overview ==
Month	Episodes	
Month	Episodes	Monthly Averages
September 2016	20	14.7%
October 2016	21	14.9%
November 2016	22	14.6%
December 2016	22	14.2%
January 2017	5	15.5%
Total	90	14.8%

== Episodes ==
=== September 2016 ===
Episode		Original air date	Social Media Hashtag	AGB Nielsen Urban Luzon Households in Television Homes			Ref.
Episode		Original air date	Social Media Hashtag	Rating	Timeslot Rank	Primetime Rank	Ref.
1	Pilot	September 5, 2016	#SomeoneToWatchOverMe	17.3%	#1	#7	
2	Akyat Ligaw	September 6, 2016	#STWOMAkyatLigaw	15.7%	#1	#7	
3	Will You Marry Me?	September 7, 2016	#STWOMWillYouMarryMe	15.1%	#1	#7	
4	Honeymoon	September 8, 2016	#STWOMHoneymoon	13.0%	#2	#8	
5	Shocking Surprise	September 9, 2016	#STWOMShockingSurprise	14.6%	#1	#7	
6	Pagbubuntis	September 12, 2016	#STWOMPagbubuntis	13.5%	#2	#8	
7	Anniversary Night	September 13, 2016	#STWOMAnniversaryNight	15.6%	#1	#7	
8	Past Love	September 14, 2016	#STWOMPastLove	13.5%	#2	#7	
9	Pusong Lito	September 15, 2016	#STWOMPusongLito	14.3%	#2	#8	
10	Alzheimers	September 16, 2016	#STWOMAlzheimers	15.4%	#2	#8	
11	Heavy Secret	September 19, 2016	#STWOMHeavySecret	12.3%	#2	#8	
12	Finding Joshua	September 20, 2016	#STWOMFindingJoshua	14.7%	#2	#8	
13	Sickness and Health	September 21, 2016	#STWOMSicknessAndHealth	14.9%	#2	#8	
14	Love Stays	September 22, 2016	#STWOMLoveStays	15.0%	#2	#8	
15	Here for You	September 23, 2016	#STWOMHereForYou	15.4%	#1	#7	
16	Looking for Love	September 26, 2016	#STWOMLookingForLove	13.4%	#2	#8	
17	Office Chismis	September 27, 2016	#STWOMOfficeChismis	15.5%	#1	#7	
18	My First Love	September 28, 2016	#STWOMMyFirstLove	14.3%	#1	#7	
19	Hello, Irene!	September 29, 2016	#STWOMHelloIrene	15.3%	#1	#7	
20	Memories of Love	September 30, 2016	#STWOMMemoriesOfLove	15.4%	#1	#6	

=== October 2016 ===
Episode		Original air date	Social Media Hashtag	AGB Nielsen Urban Luzon Households in Television Homes			Ref.
Episode		Original air date	Social Media Hashtag	Rating	Timeslot Rank	Primetime Rank	Ref.
21	Forbidden Kiss	October 3, 2016	#STWOMForbiddenKiss	14.4%	#1	#7	
22	Confused Hearts	October 4, 2016	#STWOMConfusedHearts	15.4%	#1	#6	
23	One Last Time	October 5, 2016	#STWOMOneLastTime	14.1%	#1	#7	
24	Runaway	October 6, 2016	#STWOMRunaway	15.0%	#1	#7	
25	Tamang Kutob	October 7, 2016	#STWOMTamangKutob	13.6%	#1	#7	
26	Larawan	October 10, 2016	#STWOMLarawan	14.6%	#1	#7	
27	Ex Comes Back	October 11, 2016	#STWOMExComesBack	15.0%	#1	#7	
28	Comforting TJ	October 12, 2016	#STWOMComfortingTJ	14.0%	#1	#6	
29	Shocking Kiss	October 13, 2016	#STWOMShockingKiss	15.9%	#1	#7	
30	Love Hurts	October 14, 2016	#STWOMLoveHurts	14.3%	#1	#7	
31	Confirmed	October 17, 2016	#STWOMConfirmed	14.3%	#1	#7	
32	Face to Face	October 18, 2016	#STWOMFaceToFace	14.6%	#1	#7	
33	Leave us Alone	October 19, 2016	#STWOMLeaveUsAlone	10.3%	#1	#7	
34	Bagong Lihim	October 20, 2016	#STWOMBagongLihim	16.8%	#1	#6	
35	Irene's Choice	October 21, 2016	#STWOMIrenesChoice	16.5%	#1	#6	
36	Eagerness to Change	October 24, 2016	#SomeoneToWatchOverMe	15.8%	#1	#7	
37	Pray for Joshua	October 25, 2016	#STWOMPrayForJoshua	15.8%	#1	#7	
38	Struggle is Real	October 26, 2016	#STWOMStruggleIsReal	14.6%	#1	#7	
39	The Best Man	October 27, 2016	#STWOMTheBestMan	15.7%	#1	#7	
40	Kalma Lang	October 28, 2016	#STWOMKalmaLang	16.7%	#1	#6	
41	Unexpected Hug	October 31, 2016	#STWOMUnexpextedHug	15.1%	#1	#7	

=== November 2016 ===
Episode		Original air date	Social Media Hashtag	AGB Nielsen Urban Luzon Households in Television Homes			Ref.
Episode		Original air date	Social Media Hashtag	Rating	Timeslot Rank	Primetime Rank	Ref.
42	First Night	November 1, 2016	#STWOMFirstNight	15.2%	#1	#6	
43	Father's Wish	November 2, 2016	#STWOMFathersWish	14.5%	#1	#7	
44	Forgive and Forget	November 3, 2016	#STWOMForgiveAndForget	15.7%	#1	#6	
45	Sincere Apology	November 4, 2016	#STWOMSincereApology	16.5%	#1	#6	
46	Family Bonding	November 7, 2016	#STWOMFamilyBonding	14.9%	#1	#7	
47	Hello, Ian!	November 8, 2016	#STWOMHelloIan	13.7%	#1	#7	
48	The Candidate	November 9, 2016	#STWOMTheCandidate	15.2%	#1	#5	
49	Husband's Decision	November 10, 2016	#STWOMHusbandsDecision	16.2%	#1	#6	
50	The Setup	November 11, 2016	#STWOMTheSetup	16.4%	#1	#6	
51	Let the Love Begin	November 14, 2016	#STWOMLetTheLoveBegin	14.0%	#1	#7	
52	Second Honeymoon	November 15, 2016	#STWOMSecondHoneymoon	14.8%	#1	#7	
53	Irene in Vigan	November 16, 2016	#STWOMIreneInVigan	15.0%	#1	#6	
54	Finding TJ	November 17, 2016	#STWOMFindingTJ	15.4%	#1	#6	
55	The Chase	November 18, 2016	#STWOMTheChase	16.1%	#1	#6	
56	Sa Piling ni Irene	November 21, 2016	#STWOMSaPilingNiIrene	13.8%	#1	#7	
57	Feeling Guilty	November 22, 2016	#STWOMFeelingGuilty	14.0%	#1	#7	
58	Lost and Found	November 23, 2016	#STWOMLostAndFound	14.3%	#1	#7	
59	Reset	November 24, 2016	#STWOMReset	13.2%	#1	#7	
60	Remember Me	November 25, 2016	#STWOMRememberMe	15.0%	#1	#6	
				AGB Nielsen NUTAM Households in Television Homes			
61	Memories of Love	November 28, 2016	#STWOMMemoriesOfLove	10.7%	#1	#6	
62	Angry Man	November 29, 2016	#STWOMAngryMan	13.5%	#1	#7	
63	Operation Save TJ	November 30, 2016	#STWOMOperationSaveTJ	12.7%	#1	#7	

=== December 2016 ===
Episode		Original air date	Social Media Hashtag	AGB Nielsen NUTAM Households in Television Homes			Ref.
Episode		Original air date	Social Media Hashtag	Rating	Timeslot Rank	Primetime Rank	Ref.
64	The Visitor	December 1, 2016	#STWOMTheVisitor	13.6%	#1	#7	
65	Wish Granted	December 2, 2016	#STWOMWishGranted	13.3%	#1	#7	
66	Great Pretender	December 5, 2016	#STWOMGreatPretender	13.0%	#1	#7	
67	Wedding Ring	December 6, 2016	#STWOMWeddingRing	14.7%	#1	#7	
68	The Proxy Wife	December 7, 2016	#STWOMTheProxyWife	14.4%	#1	#7	
69	Clash of Hearts	December 8, 2016	#STWOMClashOfHearts	13.8%	#1	#7	
70	Excuses	December 9, 2016	#STWOMExcuses	14.4%	#1	#7	
71	Rules of Love	December 12, 2016	#STWOMRulesOfLove	13.0%	#1	#7	
72	Dalawang Asawa	December 13, 2016	#STWOMDalawangAsawa	13.1%	#1	#7	
73	Kapit Lang	December 14, 2016	#STWOMKapitLang	14.3%	#1	#6	
74	Joanna's Decision	December 15, 2016	#STWOMJoannasDecision	12.7%	#2	#8	
75	Wife's Embrace	December 16, 2016	#STWOMWifesEmbrace	13.7%	#1	#6	
76	Paano Ka, Joanna?	December 19, 2016	#STWOMPaanoKaJoanna	14.3%	#1	#7	
77	True Love's Kiss	December 20, 2016	#STWOMTrueLovesKiss	14.5%	#1	#7	
78	Hello, Dave!	December 21, 2016	#STWOMHelloDave	14.7%	#1	#7	
79	Husband Returns	December 22, 2016	#STWOMHusbandReturns	16.0%	#1	#6	
80	Irene's Decision	December 23, 2016	#STWOMIrenesDecision	15.3%	#1	#7	
81	Thank You, Irene!	December 26, 2016	#STWOMThankYouIrene	13.1%	#1	#7	
82	Looking For Mom	December 27, 2016	#STWOMLookingForMom	13.9%	#1	#7	
83	Comeback, TJ!	December 28, 2016	#STWOMComebackTJ	14.9%	#1	#7	
84	Mama Joanna	December 29, 2016	#STWOMMamaJoanna	15.5%	#1	#7	
85	Noche Buena	December 30, 2016	#STWOMNocheBuena	16.0%	#1	#5	

=== January 2017 ===
Episode		Original air date	Social Media Hashtag	AGB Nielsen NUTAM Households in Television Homes			Ref.
Episode		Original air date	Social Media Hashtag	Rating	Timeslot Rank	Primetime Rank	Ref.
86	Salamat, Joanna!	January 2, 2017	#STWOMSalamatJoanna	14.6%	#1	#7	
87	Thanksgiving	January 3, 2017	#STWOMThanksgiving	15.1%	#1	#7	
88	Away From Home	January 4, 2017	#STWOMAwayFromHome	15.5%	#1	#7	
89	Huling Habilin	January 5, 2017	#STWOMHulingHabilin	15.4%	#1	#7	
90	Thanks for Watching Over Me	January 6, 2017	#ThanksForWatchingOverMe	17.1%	#1	#7	
