= Shine Kuk =

South Korean entertainer

Son Yung Kuk
- Born: Kuk Son Yung Seoul, South Korea
- Other name: Shine Kuk
- Occupations: Actress; dancer; singer; co-host
- Years active: 2014–present
- Agent(s): GMA Network (since 2014); ABS-CBN (2017-2018); TV5 (since 2024)

Korean name
- Hangul: 국선영
- RR: Guk Seonyeong
- MR: Kuk Sŏnyŏng

Kuk Son-young (Korean: 국선영), known professionally as Shine Kuk, is a South Korean actress, host and singer based in the Philippines. In 2014, she came into prominence after winning the "You're My Foreignay" segment on Eat Bulaga!. Kuk has since gone on to star in television shows. She has also won as Miss Korea Philippines 2018.

== Biography ==
Kuk first visited the Philippines on a family trip. In 2014, she was the grand winner of "You're My Foreignay" segment on the long-running variety show Eat Bulaga!, and also served as a co-host.

An aspiring student, actress and singer, Kuk studied Consular and Diplomatic Affairs at De La Salle–College of Saint Benilde and graduated. She guest-starred in the GMA sitcom series Vampire Ang Daddy Ko, and also appeared in the ABS-CBN comedy gag show Banana Sundae. Kuk won as Miss Korea Philippines 2018 when she was 25 years old.

In 2019, Kuk launched a YouTube channel focusing on Filipino lessons and Korean make-up. She was also the first Korean host on the Shop TV home shopping channel.

== Filmography ==
=== Television ===
Year	Title	Role
2014	Eat Bulaga	"You're My Foreignay" Grand Winner
2014	Sunday All Stars	Guest performer
2014	Unang Hirit	Guest
2014	24 Oras	Interview
2014	The Ryzza Mae Show	Guest performer
2014	Vampire Ang Daddy Ko	Guest
2014	Pop Talk	Herself
2017–2018	Banana Sundae	Herself
2020	Chika, Besh!	Segment host

=== Films ===
Year	Title	Role
2015	No Boyfriend Since Birth	Shiela
2016	I Love You To Death	Shine
