= Someone to Watch Over Me (TV series) =

Philippine television drama series

- Title card
- Genre: Romantic drama
- Created by: Maria Zita Garganera
- Written by: Agnes Gagelonia-Uligan; Anna Aleta Nadela; Glaiza Ramirez; Maria Zita Garganera
- Directed by: Maryo J. de los Reyes; Albert S. Langitan; Conrado D. Peru
- Creative director: Roy C. Iglesias
- Starring: Tom Rodriguez; Lovi Poe
- Theme music composer: Ann Margaret R. Figueroa
- Opening theme: "Di Malilimot" by Maricris Garcia
- Country of origin: Philippines
- Original language: Tagalog
- No. of episodes: 90 (list of episodes)

Production
- Executive producer: Michele R. Borja
- Production locations: Quezon City, Philippines; Vigan City, Ilocos Sur, Philippines
- Cinematography: Vivencio C. Gonzalez Jr.; Christian B. Gonzalez
- Editors: Maita Dator-Causapin; Donard Robles; Bot Tana
- Camera setup: Multiple-camera setup
- Running time: 24–30 minutes
- Production company: GMA Entertainment TV

Original release
- Network: GMA Network
- Release: September 5, 2016 – January 6, 2017

Someone to Watch Over Me is a Philippine television drama romance series broadcast by GMA Network. Directed by Maryo J. de los Reyes, it stars Tom Rodriguez and Lovi Poe. It premiered on September 5, 2016, on the network's Telebabad line up. The series concluded on January 6, 2017, with a total of 90 episodes.

The series is streaming online on YouTube.

== Premise ==
TJ falls in love with Joanna. He and his wife faces their biggest setback when he is diagnosed with early-onset Alzheimer's disease.

== Cast and characters ==
Cast

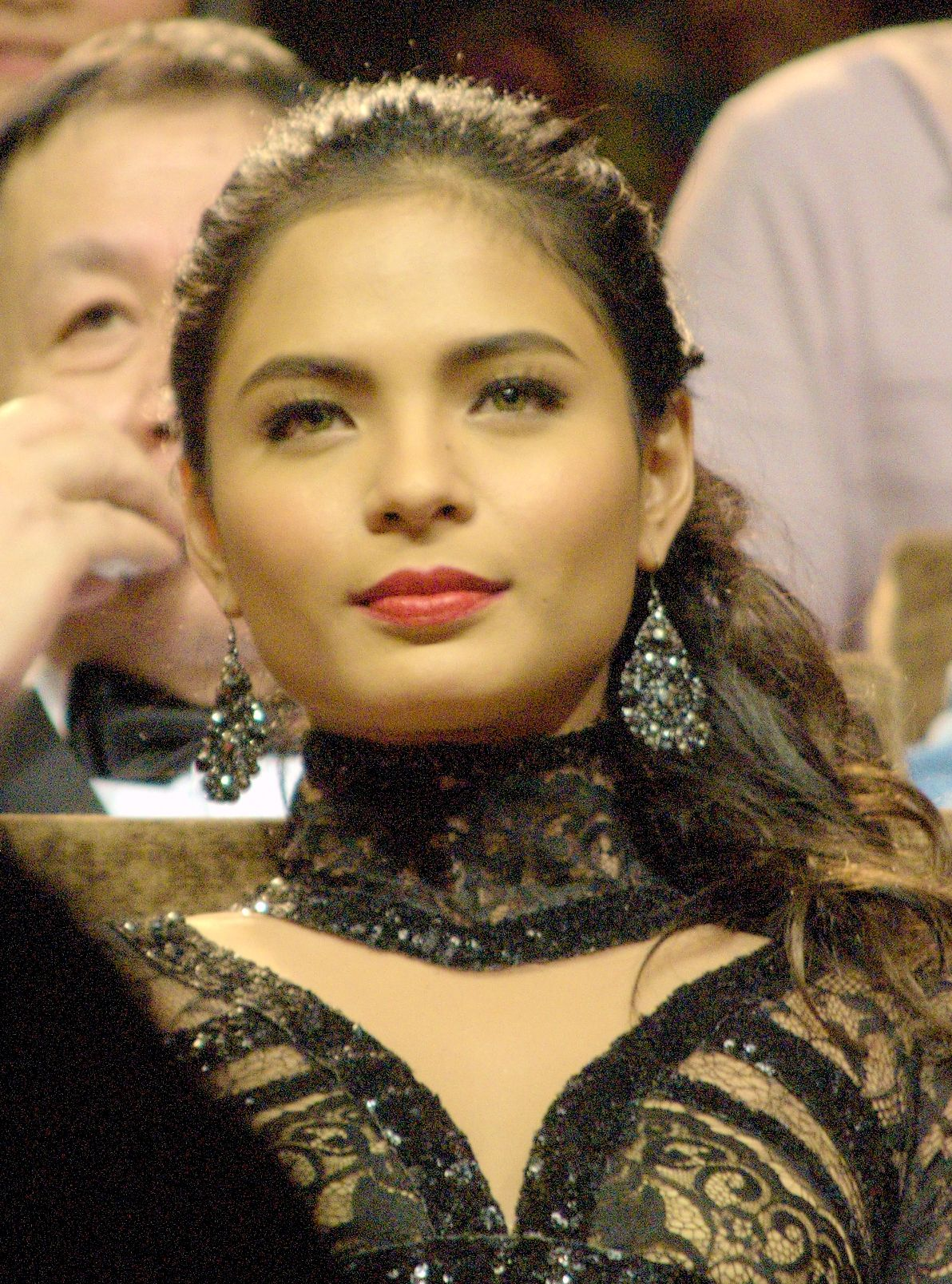
Lovi Poe

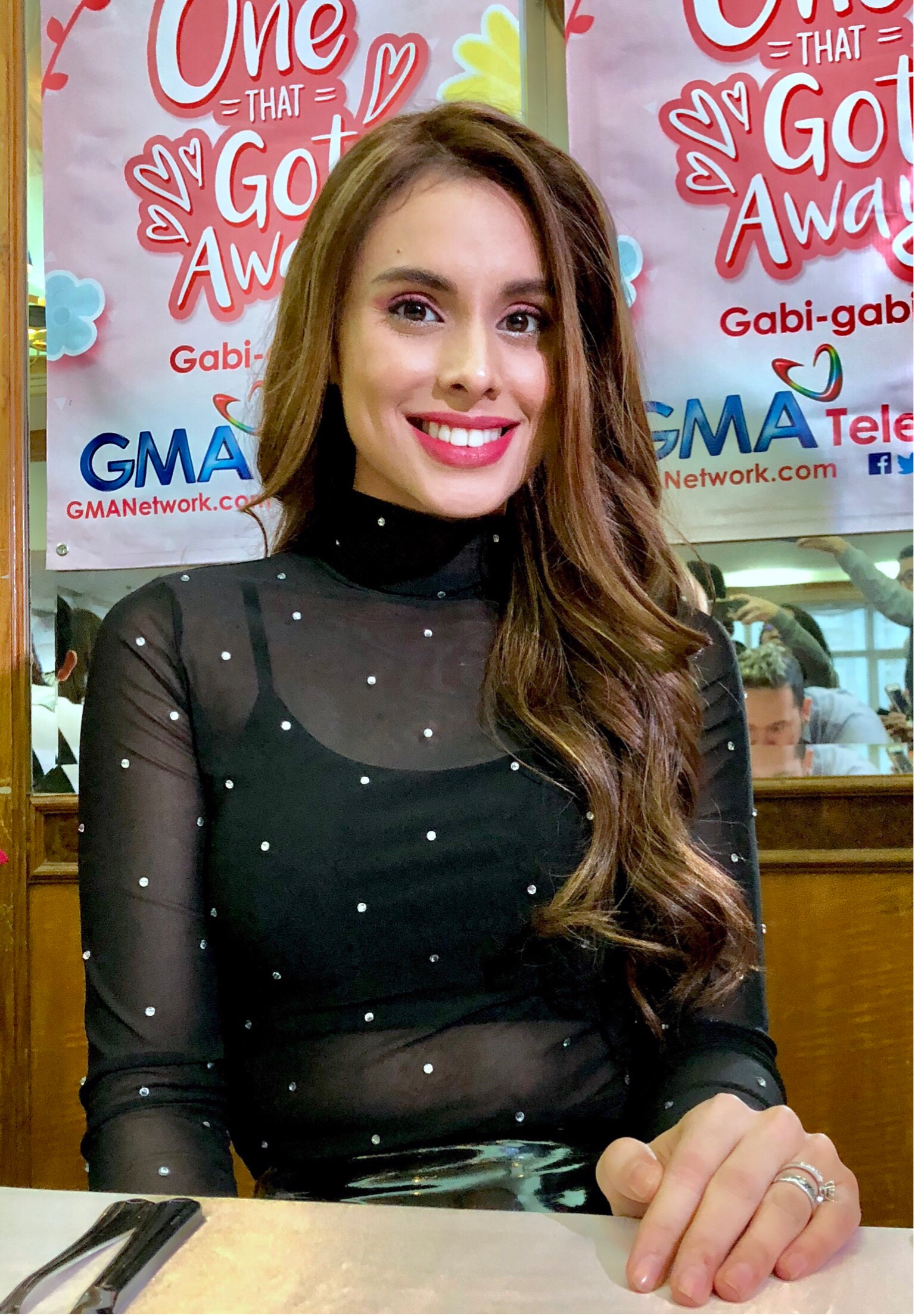
Max Collins

Lead cast

- Tom Rodriguez as Teodoro Jose "TJ" Agustin Chavez
- Lovi Poe as Joanna Mercado-Chavez

Supporting cast

- Max Collins as Irene Montenegro-Fernando
- Edu Manzano as Gregor "Buddy" Chavez
- Jackie Lou Blanco as Cielo Andrada-Chavez
- Ronnie Lazaro as Ruben "Estoy" Mercado
- Isay Alvarez-Seña as Remedios "Cita" Mercado
- Boy 2 Quizon as Paolo
- Frances Makil-Ignacio as Cecilia "Cess" Navarro
- Ralph Noriega as Jefferson "Jepoy" Mercado

Recurring cast

- Luz Valdez as Rose Montenegro
- Shyr Valdez as Osang
- Camille Torres as Eunice
- Maricris Garcia-Cruz as Monique
- Espie Salvador as Espie
- Caleb Punzalan as Joshua Chavez
- Cogie Domingo as Adrian "Ian" Alejandro

Guest cast

- Melissa Mendez as Adora Agustin
- Johnny Revilla as Irene's father
- Lui Manansala as Gracia
- Mikael Daez as Dave Fernando
- Lance Serrano as Alex
- Eugene Runas as Tope
- Dido De La Paz as Robert
- Aleera Montalla as Lulu

== Production ==
Principal photography commenced on July 6, 2016.

== Ratings ==
According to AGB Nielsen Philippines' Mega Manila household television ratings, the pilot episode of Someone to Watch Over Me earned a 17.3% rating. The final episode scored a 17.1% rating in Nationwide Urban Television Audience Measurement.

== Accolades ==
Accolades received by Someone to Watch Over Me
Year	Award	Recipient	Category	Result	Ref.
2017	New York Festivals World's Best TV & Films	Someone to Watch Over Me	Best Telenevola	Won	
