= Don't Lose the Money =

2014 Philippine television game show

- Title card
- Genre: Game show
- Directed by: Mark A. Reyes
- Presented by: Tom Rodriguez
- Country of origin: Philippines
- Original language: Tagalog
- No. of episodes: 66

Production
- Camera setup: Multiple-camera setup
- Running time: 30 minutes
- Production company: GMA Entertainment TV

Original release
- Network: GMA Network
- Release: September 22 – December 22, 2014

Don't Lose the Money is a 2014 Philippine television game show broadcast by GMA Network. Directed by Mark A. Reyes, it is hosted by Tom Rodriguez. It premiered on September 22, 2014 on the network's morning line up. The show concluded on December 22, 2014, with a total of 66 episodes.

== Ratings ==
According to AGB Nielsen Philippines' Mega Manila household television ratings, the pilot episode of Don't Lose the Money earned an 11% rating. The final episode scored a 7.9% rating.
