= I Heart Davao =

2017 Philippine television drama series

- Title card
- Also known as: My Sweet Heart
- Genre: Drama; Romantic comedy
- Created by: Marissa L. Flores
- Written by: Chris Martinez; Eljay Deldoc; Carlo Vergara; Dwein Baltazar
- Directed by: Marlon N. Rivera
- Creative director: Roy C. Iglesias
- Starring: Carla Abellana; Tom Rodriguez
- Theme music composer: Janno Gibbs
- Opening theme: "Fallin'" by Tom Rodriguez
- Country of origin: Philippines
- Original languages: Tagalog; Davaoeño
- No. of episodes: 40

Production
- Executive producer: Brian Geli
- Production locations: Davao City, Philippines
- Cinematography: Lee Briones-Meily
- Editors: Genice Cham-Panuncio; Gavian Llave; Lara Linsangan; Joss Suñer
- Camera setup: Multiple-camera setup
- Running time: 24–31 minutes
- Production company: GMA News and Public Affairs

Original release
- Network: GMA Network
- Release: June 26 – August 18, 2017

I Heart Davao (international title: My Sweet Heart) is a 2017 Philippine television drama romance series broadcast by GMA Network. Directed by Marlon N. Rivera, it stars Carla Abellana and Tom Rodriguez. It premiered on June 26, 2017 on the network's Telebabad line up. The series concluded on August 18, 2017, with a total of 40 episodes.

The series is streaming online on YouTube.

== Premise ==
Hope, a heart transplant recipient goes to Davao City to save her family's chocolate business. She meets Ponce who is the ex-boyfriend of her heart donor.

== Cast and characters ==
Cast

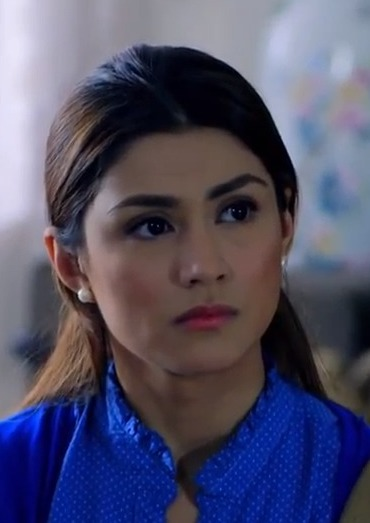
Carla Abellana

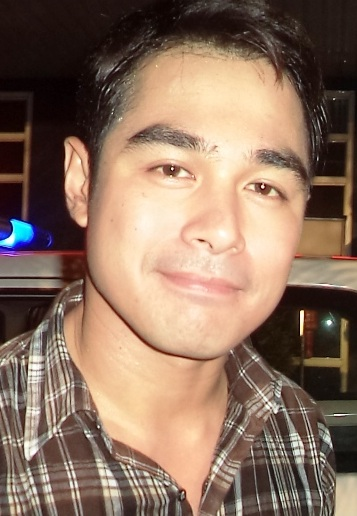
Benjamin Alves

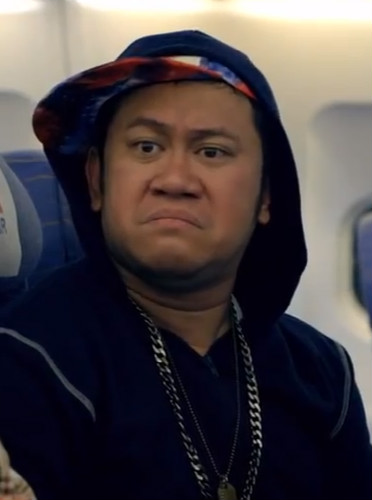
Betong Sumaya

Lead cast

- Carla Abellana as Hope Villanueva-Torres
- Tom Rodriguez as Ponce Torres

Supporting cast

- Benjamin Alves as Paul Gutierrez
- Betong Sumaya as Patrick "Tasoy" Alcancez
- Maey Bautista as Judith Bueno-Alcancez
- Catherine Remperas as Aileen Ayuban / Dorothy
- Ricardo Cepeda as Manolo Torres
- Phillip Lazaro as Vicencio "Vic"/ Vivenca "Venks" Sumpak
- Racquel Villavicencio as Helena Veronica "Helen" Villanueva
- Glenda Garcia as Mary Prudence "Pru" Villanueva
- Joel Saracho as Manuel Ayuban
- Geraldine Villamil as Mila Fostanes-Ayuban
- Nats Sitoy as Jenny Ayuban
- Kevin Sagra as Teban

Guest cast

- Patricia Tumulak as Maxine "Max" San Agustin
- Rez Cortez as Judith's father
- Ces Quesada as Judith's mother
- Zoren Legaspi as Eugene "Euge" Lumbas

== Ratings ==
I Heart Davao ratings
No.	Original air date	AGB Nielsen NUTAM People
1	June 26, 2017	7.4%
2	June 27, 2017	7.1%
3	June 28, 2017	6.8%
4	June 29, 2017	7.2%
5	June 30, 2017	6.7%
6	July 3, 2017	5.7%
7	July 4, 2017	6.5%
8	July 5, 2017	7.3%
9	July 6, 2017	6.0%
10	July 7, 2017	7.0%
11	July 10, 2017	5.8%
12	July 11, 2017	6.5%
13	July 12, 2017	6.5%
14	July 13, 2017	6.0%
15	July 14, 2017	6.7%
16	July 17, 2017	6.0%
17	July 18, 2017	6.0%
18	July 19, 2017	6.7%
19	July 20, 2017	6.8%
20	July 21, 2017	6.7%
21	July 24, 2017	6.2%
22	July 25, 2017	6.7%
23	July 26, 2017	6.9%
24	July 27, 2017	7.6%
25	July 28, 2017	8.3%
26	July 31, 2017	6.4%
27	August 1, 2017	6.9%
28	August 2, 2017	7.3%
29	August 3, 2017	7.0%
30	August 4, 2017	7.6%
31	August 7, 2017	6.7%
32	August 8, 2017	6.9%
33	August 9, 2017	6.3%
34	August 10, 2017	5.4%
35	August 11, 2017	6.2%
36	August 14, 2017	5.8%
37	August 15, 2017	6.0%
38	August 16, 2017	6.6%
39	August 17, 2017	6.6%
40	August 18, 2017	6.5%

== Production ==
Principal photography commenced on May 19, 2017, in Davao City.
