= Kevin Santos (actor) =

Filipino actor

- Born: Kayvin Acupicup Santos; Manila, Philippines
- Education: AB Political Science, Cum laude Arellano University
- Occupations: Actor, pilot, vlogger
- Years active: 2004–present
- Spouse: Raphee Delos Reyes (2022)

Kayvin Acupicup Santos, also known on his stage name Kevin Santos, is a Filipino actor and was discovered in the Philippine over-all talent competition, StarStruck.

== Personal life ==
Santos graduated high school through the Alternative Learning System in which he is homeschooled. He studied aviation course to be a pilot at Omni Aviation Corporation in Angeles City. He finished cum laude on a degree in political science at Arellano University.

== Starstruck ==
Kevin Santos was included in the Final 14 of StarStruck wherein Ryza Cenon and Mike Tan won as the Ultimate Survivors. He was eliminated contestant that was followed by the Bb Pilipinas 2007 contestant Ailyn Luna.

== Post StarStruck ==
Shortly after the contest, Santos underwent various workshops and TV guestings in 2004 while waiting for his break. In 2008, he hired Joe Barrameda to co-manage his showbiz career with GMA Artist Center.

Since then he has frequently played supporting and comedic roles in television dramas, including roles in Basahang Ginto, My Husband's Lover, Ismol Family, Poor Señorita, and Kambal Karibal.

In 2013, he top billed his first gay role in My Husband's Lover as Danny, the best friend of Eric (Dennis Trillo); where he got a lot of positive feedback from the fans of the show.

In 2018, he took a private pilot course at Omni Aviation for his licensure as a pilot. Later that month, he managed to ace his two major exams, namely his 350 item DepEd exam and his 625 item Private Pilot exams, that simultaneously scheduled in the same week. On the 27th of March, he announced that he is now a licensed private pilot.

Same that year, Santos had his guest appearance in Kambal, Karibal as Xander Liwanag, a key character to the show with black magic powers such as soul-switching and exorcism.

== Filmography ==
=== Television ===
Year	Title	Role
2022	Start-Up PH	Darwin Pascual
2021	Legal Wives	Omar
2019	Beautiful Justice	Kyle Balagtas
2018	Daddy's Gurl	Daboy
2018	Tadhana: Kamao	Joey
2018	Magpakailanman: Pasan Ko Ang Aking Ina	Mario
2018	Celebrity Bluff	Himself
2018	Kambal, Karibal	Xander Liwanag
2017-2018	Super Ma'am	Casper
2017	Imbestigador: The Atio Castillo Case	John Paul Solano
2017	All Star Videoke	Himself
2017	Magpakailanman: Small and Lovable	Rico
2017	Dear Uge: Torn Between Beshies	Kiel
2017	Magpakailanman: The Healing Touch of Love	Seminarian
2017	Daig Kayo ng Lola Ko: Sandro Sapatero at Ang Mga Duwende	Duwende
2017	Maynila: Suntok Sa Buwan	Jonison "Joni" Fontanos
2017	Meant To Be	Chef Bong
2016	Dear Uge: Militar Mommy	Jako
2016	A1 Ko Sa 'Yo	Tonyo
2016	Poor Señorita	Kilmer
2016	Dear Uge: Mother In-Lost	Rodrigo
2015	Maynila: Love Wins	
2015	My Faithful Husband	Dodong
2014-2015	Yagit	Kardo Macabuhay
2014	Ismol Family	Lance
2014	Wagas: Sherry and Emman Love Story	Emman
2014	The Borrowed Wife	Jorrel Geraldes
2013	Magpakailanman: Peligro sa Sariling Buhay	James
2013	Wagas: John and Uyen Love Story	John Feir
2013	My Husband's Lover	Danny
2013	Unforgettable	Randy Legaspi
2012	Faithfully	Edjie Miranda
2012	Magpakailanman: Power of Love	Lester
2012	Tweets For My Sweet	Inoy
2012	My Beloved	Teen Erwin
2012	The Good Daughter	Arnold
2011	Kung Aagawin Mo ang Langit	Lester Feliciano
2011	Maynila: Hanging On	Joaqui
2011	I Heart You, Pare!	Joni
2010	Sine Novela: Basahang Ginto	Rocky Vergara
2009	Bubble Gang	Himself
2009	Darna	Inoy
2009	Obra: Reunion	Ryan
2009	Show Me Da Manny	Chris
2009	Ang Babaeng Hinugot sa Aking Tadyang	Jason
2008	Ako si Kim Samsoon	Aaron
2008	Una Kang Naging Akin	Biboy
2008	Dyesebel	Fonsy
2008	E.S.P.	
2007	Kamandag	Randy
2007	My Only Love	Paul
2007	Kung Mahawi Man ang Ulap	Tencho
2006	Baywalk	Various
2006	Agawin Mo Man ang Lahat	Various
2005	Maynila	Various
2004	StarStruck (Season 2)	Avenger / Himself

=== Film ===
Year	Title	Role
2008	Dobol Trobol: Lets Get Redi 2 Rambol!	Pickpocket (uncredited)
2012	My Kontrabida Girl	Kevin
2012	Boy Pick-Up: The Movie	Cute Guy
2014	Basement	Mang Mario
2014	So It's You	Jojo
2014	Dilim	Benjo

== Awards and nominations ==
Year	Award	Category	Nominated work	Result
2014	11th Golden Screen TV Awards	Outstanding Supporting Actor in a Drama Series	My Husband's Lover	Won
