= Natalia Moon =

Australian actress and singer-songwriter

Natalia Moon (June 11, 1991) is an Australian, Brisbane born and Darwin raised, actress, singer-songwriter and DJ. She rose to fame for her role in the Filipino sitcom, 'Ismol Family' on GMA Network, (2013–2015) in which she was nominated for 'Outstanding Breakthrough Actress'.

She also starred in the international television drama musical, TKM The Boston, in the lead role as 'Julia', which aired internationally on TFC and Myx TV (2015–2016). She also became the host of North Bound Travel Show produced for ANC News on ABS-CBN in 2016, wherein she left Ismol Family. She has had numerous roles on Shop TV and also appeared as a guest in GMA Network shows such as Aha, Mars, #like, and Eat Bulaga.

Moon also known as (DJ Natalia Moon) travels both domestically and internationally to spin her tracks. She also has her alter ego, Neon Moon, as she DJ's with neon paint in the dark. A recent Asia tour included China, Malaysia, Thailand, Philippines, Singapore, Laos, and Bahrain. She traveled to India in which she competed for the DJ World Champion title, 'Queen of the Mashups', leaving with the title for first place. She plays EDM, house, Latin and hip hop. Moon is not only a DJ, she also includes live singing into her set and she produces her own tracks.

Moon attended St John's College in Darwin and Belridge High in Perth.

== Notable appearances ==
=== Ismol Family ===
Moon starred in the Filipino sitcom Ismol Family, playing the comedic character 'Natalia', a catty maid and extended cousin of the 'Ismol residence' on GMA Network. Her character shared a love team with Mikael Daez. Moon was a part of the show for two years between 2013 and 2015, in which she was nominated for the Golden Screen TV Awards in 2015.

=== Tkm The Boston (TV show) ===
Moon played the lead role 'Julia' in Tkm The Boston also known as 'Kitchen musical 2', sharing the love triangle with 'Gretchen' (Jennifer Blair Bianco) and 'Noah' (Michael Koltes) Tkm The Boston is a drama musical TV show based around three high school friends incorporating drama, music and food. It aired on Myx TV and TFC internationally.

=== North Bound Travel Show (TV show) ===
Moon hosted North Bound Travel, a travel show based in North Philippines. She traveled the whole of North Luzon featuring the best restaurants, hotels and fun adventures. This aired on ANC News TV in the Philippines and abroad in 2015.

=== Shop TV ===
Moon hosted various products for The Shop TV Network including 'Sonic Toothbrush and 'Zinuo luggage'. Her co host was YouTuber Wil Dasovich. This aired between 2015 and 2016.

=== Asia's Got Talent ===
Moon appeared briefly on the first season of Asia's Got Talent where was unsuccessful in the auditions.

== Singing career ==
Moon got noticed from a cover song called "Pusong Bato", in which landed her a guesting on GMA News TV. This was the beginning of her singing career and the beginning of her career in Philippines show biz. She started learning more of the Filipino language and landed a role on Ismol Family.

== DJ/producing career ==
Moon became a DJ after attending Bounce music school in BGC at the start of 2015, learning mixing songs and also music production in Abelton. She DJ's for fiestas and festivals local and abroad, mixing Hip hop, house, EDM and also corporate shows. Moon is a unique DJ as she sings live hip hop and edm songs during the set.

== Awards and achievements ==
- Nominated for New Female Recording Artist of the year 9TH PMPC AWARDS Philippines 2018
- Nomination for Outstanding Breakthrough Actress Ismol Family
- Uno Magazine Cover
- BYS cosmetics
- Philippines Magazine
- Hansel Crackers Commercial (lead)
