= List of Love of My Life episodes =

Love of My Life is a 2020 Philippine television drama series broadcast by GMA Network. It premiered on the network's Telebabad line up and worldwide via GMA Pinoy TV from February 3, 2020 to March 19, 2021, replacing One of the Baes.

== Series overview ==
Season	Episodes	Originally released	
Season	Episodes	First released	Last released
1	80	February 3, 2020	March 19, 2021

== Episodes ==
No. overall	No. in season	Title	Social media hashtag	Original release date	AGB Nielsen Ratings (NUTAM People)	Timeslot rank
1	1	"World Premiere"	#LoveOfMyLifeWorldPremiere	February 3, 2020	8.6%	#1
2	2	"Destined to Meet"	#LOMLDestinedToMeet	February 4, 2020	7.3%	#2
3	3	"Falling in Love"	#LOMLFallingInLove	February 5, 2020	7.9%	#2
4	4	"Proposal"	#LOMLProposal	February 6, 2020	6.0%	#2
5	5	"Yes to Forever"	#LOMLYesToForever	February 7, 2020	7.3%	#2
6	6	"Isabella at Stefano" (transl. Isabella and Stefano)	#LOMLIsabellaAtStefano	February 10, 2020	7.1%	#1
7	7	"Honeymoon"	#LOMLHoneymoon	February 11, 2020	8.4%	#1
8	8	"In Denial"	#LOMLInDenial	February 12, 2020	7.8%	#2
9	9	"The Truth"	#LOMLTheTruth	February 13, 2020	7.6%	#2
10	10	"Ina at Asawa" (transl. Mother and Spouse)	#LOMLInaAtAsawa	February 14, 2020	8.1%	#1
11	11	"Nikolai"	#LOMLNikolai	February 17, 2020	7.3%	#2
12	12	"Painful Past"	#LOMLPainfulPast	February 18, 2020	7.1%	#1
13	13	"Wife Meets Ex"	#LOMLWifeMeetsEx	February 19, 2020	7.0%	#2
14	14	"We Are Family"	#LOMLWeAreFamily	February 20, 2020	7.7%	#1
15	15	"Father and Son"	#LOMLFatherAndSon	February 21, 2020	8.6%	#1
16	16	"Selosan" (transl. Jealousy)	#LOMLSelosan	February 24, 2020	7.0%	#2
17	17	"Iisang Bubong" (transl. One Roof)	#LOMLIisangBubong	February 25, 2020	7.8%	#1
18	18	"Adelle vs. Kelly"	#LOMLAdelleVSKelly	February 26, 2020	7.7%	#1
19	19	"Para sa Anak" (transl. For the Child)	#LOMLParaSaAnak	February 27, 2020	6.9%	#1
20	20	"Happy Place"	#LOMLHappyPlace	February 28, 2020	7.7%	#1
21	21	"In Danger"	#LOMLInDanger	March 2, 2020	7.6%	#1
22	22	"Tension"	#LOMLTension	March 3, 2020	8.2%	#1
23	23	"Begging For Time"	#LOMLBeggingForTime	March 4, 2020	7.6%	#1
24	24	"Praying For Miracle"	#LOMLPrayingForMiracle	March 5, 2020	8.0%	#1
25	25	"Pagluluksa" (transl. Mourn)	#LOMLPagluluksa	March 6, 2020	8.0%	#1
26	26	"Mother's Grief"	#LOMLMothersGrief	March 9, 2020	8.4%	#1
27	27	"Honoring Stefano"	#LOMLHonoringStefano	March 10, 2020	7.8%	#1
28	28	"Paalam, Stefano" (transl. Goodbye, Stefano)	#LOMLPaalamStefano	March 11, 2020	7.5%	#1
29	29	"Pagtatalo" (transl. Dispute)	#LOMLPagtatalo	March 12, 2020	6.6%	#1
30	30	"New Life"	#LOMLNewLife	March 13, 2020	9.4%	#1
31	31	"Nikolai and Kelly"	#LOMLNikolaiAndKelly	March 16, 2020	8.2%	#1
32	32	"Kelly's Baggage"	#LOMLKellysBaggage	March 17, 2020	9.7%	#1
33	33	"Peace Not War"	#LOMLPeaceNotWar	March 18, 2020	8.0%	#1
34	34	"Eden Knows"	#LOMLEdenKnows	March 19, 2020	7.9%	#1
35	35	"Regretful"	#LOMLRegretful	March 20, 2020	9.7%	#1
36	36	"Getting Closer"	#LOMLGettingCloser	January 18, 2021	15.3%	#1
37	37	"Missing You"	#LOMLMissingYou	January 19, 2021	14.8%	#1
38	38	"Girl Talk"	#LOMLGirlTalk	January 20, 2021	15.6%	#1
39	39	"Para sa Ama" (transl. For Our Father)	#LOMLParaSaAma	January 21, 2021	14.2%	#1
40	40	"No Label"	#LOMLNoLabel	January 22, 2021	14.5%	#1
41	41	"Misunderstanding"	#LOMLMisunderstanding	January 25, 2021	14.1%	#1
42	42	"Confession"	#LOMLConfession	January 26, 2021	N/A	TBA
43	43	"Complicated"	#LOMLComplicated	January 27, 2021	N/A	TBA
44	44	"No Chance"	#LOMLNoChance	January 28, 2021	N/A	TBA
45	45	"Space"	#LOMLSpace	January 29, 2021	N/A	TBA
46	46	"Isabella Finds Out"	#LOMLIsabellaFindsOut	February 1, 2021	15.0%	#1
47	47	"Mother and Son"	#LOMLMotherAndSon	February 2, 2021	15.1%	#1
48	48	"Keeping a Promise"	#LOMLKeepingAPromise	February 3, 2021	14.7%	#1
49	49	"Small World"	#LOMLSmallWorld	February 4, 2021	14.7%	#1
50	50	"Angry Kelly"	#LOMLAngryKelly	February 5, 2021	15.6%	#1
51	51	"Play by the Rules"	#LOMLPlayByTheRules	February 8, 2021	N/A	TBA
52	52	"Isabella's Past"	#LOMLIsabellasPast	February 9, 2021	N/A	TBA
53	53	"Missing Stefano"	#LOMLMissingStefano	February 10, 2021	N/A	TBA
54	54	"Gift of Love"	#LOMLGiftOfLove	February 11, 2021	N/A	TBA
55	55	"No More Secrets"	#LOMLNoMoreSecrets	February 12, 2021	N/A	TBA
56	56	"Marry Kelly"	#LOMLMarryKelly	February 15, 2021	N/A	TBA
57	57	"Adelle Falls for Nikolai"	#LOMLAdelleFallsForNikolai	February 16, 2021	N/A	TBA
58	58	"Level Up"	#LOMLLevelUp	February 17, 2021	N/A	TBA
59	59	"New Kelly"	#LOMLNewKelly	February 18, 2021	N/A	TBA
60	60	"Ikaw Pa Rin" (transl. Only You)	#LOMLIkawPaRin	February 19, 2021	N/A	TBA
61	61	"Worried Much"	#LOMLWorriedMuch	February 22, 2021	17.5%	#1
62	62	"Get Well, Nikolai"	#LOMLGetWellNikolai	February 23, 2021	17.3%	#1
63	63	"It Really Hurts"	#LOMLItReallyHurts	February 24, 2021	17.4%	#1
64	64	"Goodbye, Feelings"	#LOMLGoodbyeFeelings	February 25, 2021	N/A	TBA
65	65	"Unexpected"	#LOMLUnexpected	February 26, 2021	16.7%	#1
66	66	"Selfless Adelle"	#LOMLSelflessAdelle	March 1, 2021	16.5%	#1
67	67	"Mother's Instinct"	#LOMLMothersInstict	March 2, 2021	17.0%	#1
68	68	"Too Much Stress"	#LOMLTooMuchStress	March 3, 2021	17.3%	#1
69	69	"Siony vs. Nikolai"	#LOMLSionyVsNikolai	March 4, 2021	N/A	TBA
70	70	"New Place"	#LOMLNewPlace	March 5, 2021	18.7%	#1
71	71	"Mahal na Kita" (transl. I Love You)	#LOMLMahalNaKita	March 8, 2021	17.9%	#1
72	72	"Brokenhearted"	#LOMLBrokenhearted	March 9, 2021	17.4%	#1
73	73	"Apologies"	#LOMLApologies	March 10, 2021	18.5%	#1
74	74	"Sisihan" (transl. Blame)	#LOMLSisihan	March 11, 2021	19.4%	#1
75	75	"Friendship Over"	#LOMLFriendshipOver	March 12, 2021	18.3%	#1
76	76	"Extreme Pain"	#LOMLExtremePain	March 15, 2021	18.4%	#1
77	77	"Healing Starts"	#LOMLHealingStarts	March 16, 2021	19.4%	#1
78	78	"Finding Nikolai"	#LOMLFindingNikolai	March 17, 2021	17.7%	#1
79	79	"Letting Go"	#LOMLLettingGo	March 18, 2021	N/A	TBA
80	80	"Power of Love"	#LOMLPowerOfLove	March 19, 2021	19.7%	TBA
