= Basahang Ginto =

2010 Philippine television drama series

- Title card
- Also known as: Golden Heart
- Genre: Drama
- Created by: Mars Ravelo
- Based on: Basahang Ginto (1952) by Mar S. Torres
- Directed by: Joel Lamangan
- Creative director: Jun Lana
- Starring: Carla Abellana; Geoff Eigenmann
- Theme music composer: Danny Tan
- Opening theme: "Kung Mayrong Pangarap" by La Diva
- Country of origin: Philippines
- Original language: Tagalog
- No. of episodes: 90

Production
- Executive producer: Kaye Atienza-Cadsawan
- Production locations: Metro Manila, Philippines
- Camera setup: Multiple-camera setup
- Running time: 30–45 minutes
- Production company: GMA Entertainment TV

Original release
- Network: GMA Network
- Release: May 24 – September 24, 2010

Basahang Ginto (transl. gold rag / international title: Golden Heart) is a 2010 Philippine television drama series broadcast by GMA Network. Based on a Philippine comic book by Mars Ravelo and the 1952 Philippine film of the same title, the series is the twentieth instalment of Sine Novela. Directed by Joel Lamangan, it stars Carla Abellana and Geoff Eigenmann. It premiered on May 24, 2010 on the network's Dramarama sa Hapon line up. The series concluded on September 24, 2010, with a total of 90 episodes.

== Cast and characters ==
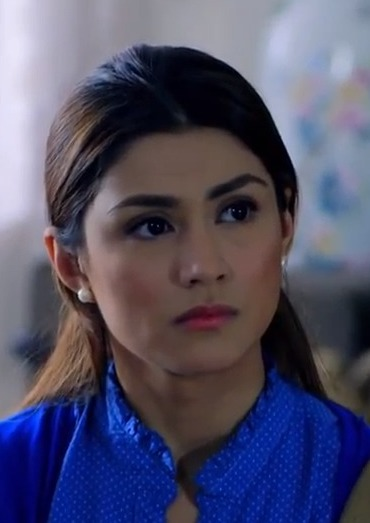
Carla Abellana portrays Orang Dimarucot.

Lead cast

- Geoff Eigenmann as Danny Vergara
- Carla Abellana as Orang Dimarucot / Laura Leyva

Supporting cast

- Jackie Lou Blanco as Elaine Vergara
- Rita Avila as Ising Dimarucot
- Tony Mabesa as Cecilo Cortez
- Bearwin Meily as Manoro Dimarucot Sr.
- Jim Pebangco as Godofredo "Godo" Pandol
- Samantha Lopez as Lilian Gonzaga
- Kevin Santos as Rocky Vergara
- Vaness del Moral as Sylvia Villarama
- Eunice Lagusad as Angela "Gilay" Dimarucot
- Byron Ortile as Manoro "Michael" Dimarucot Jr.
- Celia Rodriguez as Marina Vergara

Recurring cast

- Aiko Melendez as Rosenda Montecillo
- Polo Ravales as Anton
- Dominic Roco as Aris
- Jhoana Marie Tan as Deedee Gonzaga
- Kaye Alipio as Nikki
- Sophia Halabi as Rachel
- Neofytos Kyriakou as Yego
- Afi Africa as Bebot
- Ruby Ruiz as Agta
- Lucho Ayala as Benjie
- Ma. Rosario Bustamante as Amy
- Marie Dionne de Guzman as Susan
- Gracie Henson as Sarah
- Anna Vicente as the mean girl
- Michelle Vito as the mean girl

Guest cast

- Toby Alejar as Wilmar Vergara
- Princess Freking as younger Orang

== Ratings ==
According to AGB Nielsen Philippines' Mega Manila household television ratings, the pilot episode of Basahang Ginto earned a 13.1% rating. The final episode scored a 7.2% rating in Mega Manila People/Individual television ratings.
