= Love of My Life (Philippine TV series) =

Philippine television drama series

- Title card
- Genre: Romantic drama
- Created by: Agnes Gagelonia-Uligan
- Written by: Agnes Gagelonia-Uligan; Ronalean Sales; Anna Aleta Nadela; Dang Sulit-Marino
- Directed by: Don Michael Perez
- Creative director: Aloy Adlawan
- Starring: Coney Reyes; Carla Abellana; Mikael Daez; Rhian Ramos
- Theme music composer: Vehnee Saturno
- Opening theme: "Sa Aking Panaginip" by Maricris Garcia-Cruz
- Country of origin: Philippines
- Original language: Tagalog
- No. of episodes: 80 (list of episodes)

Production
- Executive producers: Michele Robles Borja; Mona Coles-Mayuga
- Cinematography: Rhino Vidanes
- Editors: Robert Pancho; Debbie Robete; Julius Castillo
- Camera setup: Multiple-camera setup
- Running time: 23–36 minutes
- Production company: GMA Entertainment Group

Original release
- Network: GMA Network
- Release: February 3, 2020 – March 19, 2021

Love of My Life is a Philippine television drama romance series broadcast by GMA Network. Directed by Don Michael Perez, it stars Coney Reyes, Carla Abellana, Mikael Daez and Rhian Ramos. It premiered on February 3, 2020 on the network's Telebabad line up. The series concluded on March 19, 2021, with a total of 80 episodes.

The series is streaming online on YouTube.

== Cast and characters ==
Cast

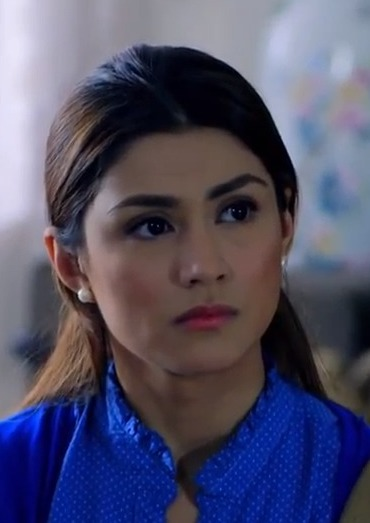
Carla Abellana

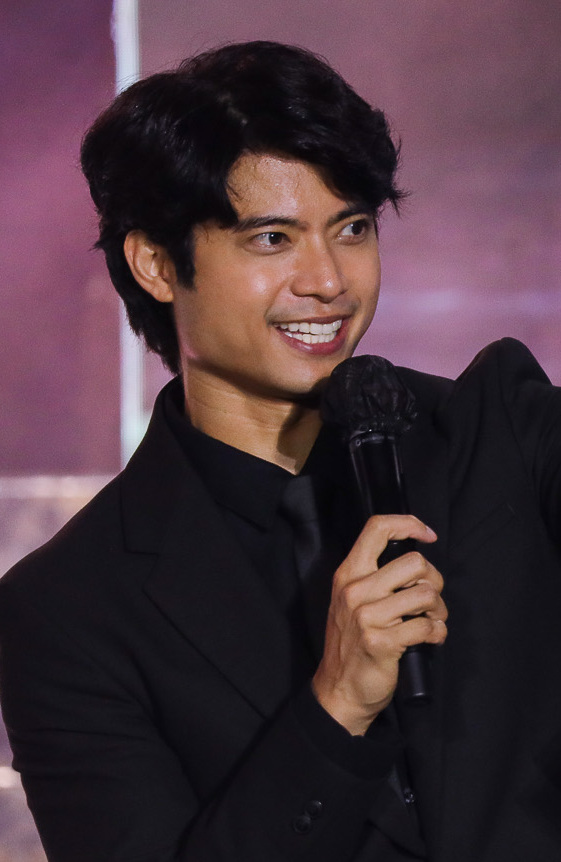
Mikael Daez

Lead cast

- Coney Reyes as Isabella Gonzales
- Carla Abellana as Adelle Nisperos-Gonzales
- Mikael Daez as Nikolai "Niks" Gonzales
- Rhian Ramos as Raquel "Kelly" Generoso-Gonzales

Supporting cast

- Vaness del Moral as Joyce Castro
- Geleen Eugenio as Eden Layug
- Samantha Lopez as Janice Bustamante
- Maey Bautista as Charmaine "Cha-Mae" Facundo
- Ethan Hariot as Gideon "Giddy" Generoso Gonzales
- Raphael Landicho as Andrei Nisperos Gonzales
- Djanin Cruz as Diane Victorino
- Ana De Leon as Liezel Canlas
- Levi Ignacio as Arsenio "Arsing" Valdez
- Carl Guevarra as Ezekiel "Kiel" Oliveros
- Dino Pastrano as Elmer Nisperos
- Anna Marin as Asuncion "Siony" Nisperos

Recurring cast

- Tom Rodriguez as Stefano Gonzales
- Angeli Bayani as Rosanna "Osang" Layug

Guest cast

- Johnny Revilla as Enrico Gonzales
- William Lorenzo as Eduardo "Edong" Generoso / Frederick "Fred" Enriquez
- Crystal Paras as Jessa
- Angelica Ulip as Janina
- Jay Arcilla as Jopet

== Production ==
Principal photography was halted in March 2020 due to the enhanced community quarantine in Luzon caused by the COVID-19 pandemic. Filming was continued in September 2020. The series resumed its programming on January 18, 2021.

== Ratings ==
According to AGB Nielsen Philippines' Nationwide Urban Television Audience Measurement People in Television Homes, the pilot episode of Love of My Life earned an 8.6% rating. The final episode scored a 19.7% rating, which is the series' highest rating.

== Accolades ==
Accolades received by Love of My Life
Year	Award	Category	Recipient	Result	Ref.
2021	34th PMPC Star Awards for Television	Best Drama Actress	Coney Reyes	Nominated	
2021	34th PMPC Star Awards for Television	Best Primetime Drama Series	Love of My Life	Nominated	
