= Carla Abellana =

Filipino actress (born 1986)

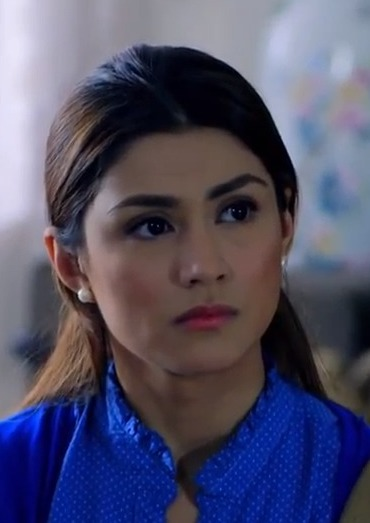
- Abellana in 2014
- Born: Carla Angeline Reyes Abellana; June 12, 1986 (age 40); Manila, Philippines
- Education: De La Salle University (BA)
- Occupations: Actress; model
- Years active: 2002–present
- Agent(s): Sparkle (2009–2023); GMA Network (2009–present); Triple A Management (2023–present)
- Spouses: Tom Rodriguez (m. 2021; div. 2024) Reginald Santos (m. 2025)

Carla Angeline Reyes Abellana-Santos (formerly Mott), (Tagalog: [ˈkaɾlɐ ʔabɛlˈjanɐ]; born June 12, 1986) is a Filipino actress who played the lead role in the Philippine adaptation of the Mexican telenovela Rosalinda (2009). She is also known for other leading roles in Sine Novela: Basahang Ginto (2010), Kung Aagawin Mo Ang Langit (2011–2012), Makapiling Kang Muli (2012), My Husband's Lover (2013), My Destiny (2014), Because of You (2015–2016), Mulawin vs. Ravena, I Heart Davao (2017), Pamilya Roces (2018), Love of My Life (2020–2021), Stolen Life (2023–2024) and Widows' War (2024–2025). She is currently an exclusive artist of Triple A Management and exclusive talent of GMA Network.

== Early life and education ==
Carla Angeline Reyes Abellana was born on June 12, 1986, in Manila. Abellana is the daughter of actor Rey "PJ" Abellana and Rea Reyes. Her maternal grandmother is veteran actress, Delia Razon. She graduated cum laude from De La Salle University with a Bachelor of Arts degree in psychology.

== Career ==
Abellana began her career modeling for different TV commercials, including CreamSilk Leave-on in 2002 and Palmolive Conditioner in 2005 (with the appearance of Ricky Reyes). In 2009, she auditioned for Zorro, but GMA Network instead cast her for the lead role in Rosalinda—a remake of the Mexican telenovela of the same name. In the same year, she subsequently became a model for Bench. In 2011, Abellana had a spread in Philippine Tatler photographed by America's Next Top Model judge Nigel Barker. She also appeared in the Philippine Fashion Week 2011, where she modeled clothes by Michele Sison. She has co-hosted SOP Rules, StarStruck, Party Pilipinas, the cooking show Del Monte Kitchenomics, and Karelasyon, a drama anthology series, as well as hosting several pageants such as Binibining Pilipinas 2010 and Miss World Philippines 2013. In 2013, she joined Sunday All Stars as a judge.

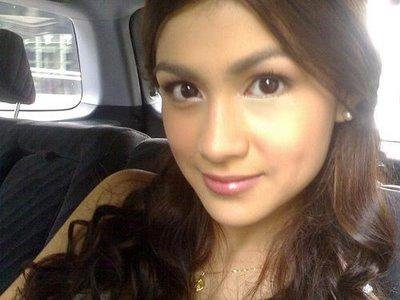
Abellana in 2009

Abellana is a contract star of Regal Films, signing a 12-picture contract with the company. Her first film under Regal Films was Mamarazzi. Abellana appeared in her first horror film which was an entry to 2010 Metro Manila Film Festival, Shake, Rattle & Roll XII. In September 2011, Abellana starred in the Regal Films film My Neighbor's Wife, and by the end of 2011, appeared in two films—both of which were entries to the 2011 Metro Manila Film Festival—Yesterday, Today, Tomorrow and Manila Kingpin: The Asiong Salonga Story. In 2014, she starred in the ensemble romantic comedy by Jose Javier Reyes Somebody to Love alongside Matteo Guidicelli, and So It's You with JC de Vera and Tom Rodriguez. In 2015, she starred in the film No Boyfriend Since Birth, again with Rodriguez, and was her second film with Reyes.

In 2024, Abellana was part of the main cast on Widows' War, portraying the main antagonist, Georgina "George" Balay-Palacios. Prior to that she was cast as Lucy Rigor in Stolen Life with Gabby Concepcion and Beauty Gonzalez in 2023.

== Personal life ==
Abellana married actor Tom Rodriguez in October 2021. In June 2022, the marriage was dissolved by a United States decree, which was confirmed by the Philippine courts in June 2024. In December 2025, she married Reginald Santos, a doctor.

In September 2024, Abellana revealed she suffered hypothyroidism since 2019 and was perimenopausal at age 37. She was also diagnosed with kidney stone disease and urinary tract infection.

== Filmography ==
=== Film ===
Year	Title	Role	Notes
2010	Mamarazzi	Mimi Gonzales	Main role
2010	Shake, Rattle and Roll 12	Diane	PMPC Star Awards for Movies Award for Best New Movie Actress; Young Critics Circle Award for Best Performance; Nominated — Metro Manila Film Festival Award for Best Actress; Nominated — Golden Screen Awards for Breakthrough Performance by an Actress
2011	My Neighbor's Wife	Jasmine Bernal	Nominated — Luna Awards for Best Supporting Actress
2011	Yesterday, Today, Tomorrow	Charlotte	
2011	Manila Kingpin: The Asiong Salonga Story	Fidela	Nominated — FAMAS Award for Best Actress
2014	Third Eye	Mylene	
2014	So It's You	Lira Joy Macaspac	
2014	Somebody to Love	Sabrina Madrilejos	
2014	Shake, Rattle & Roll XV	Aimee	Nominated — 2014 Metro Manila Film Festival for Best Actress
2015	No Boyfriend Since Birth	Carina Miranda	
2023	Voltes V: Legacy – The Cinematic Experience	Mary Ann Armstrong	
2025	Shake, Rattle & Roll: Evil Origins	Madre Clara	"1775" 51st Metro Manila Film Festival Official Entry

=== Television ===
==== Series ====
Year	Title	Role
2009	Rosalinda	Rosalinda Perez / Paloma Dorantes
2010	The Last Prince	Sonia
2010	Sine Novela: Basahang Ginto	Orang Dimarucot / Laura Leyva
2010	Ilumina	Hannah
2010	Jillian: Namamasko Po	Joyce
2011	Magic Palayok	Pilar Sallave
2011–2012	Kung Aagawin Mo ang Langit	Ellery Martinez-Alejandro
2012	Legacy	Herself (endorser)
2012	Makapiling Kang Muli	Leilani Angeles
2013	My Husband's Lover	Eulalia "Lally" Agatep-Soriano
2014	My Destiny	Grace Dela Rosa-Andrada
2015	Pari 'Koy	Michelle Capistrano-Banal
2015	Dangwa	Julia
2015–2016	Because of You	Andrea Marquez-Salcedo
2016	Juan Happy Love Story	Adult Katkat
2017	Mulawin vs. Ravena	Aviona
2017	I Heart Davao	Hope Villanueva-Torres
2018	Pamilya Roces	Crystal Rose Roces-Javellana
2020–2021	Love of My Life	Adelle Nisperos-Gonzales
2021	To Have & to Hold	Erica Pineda-Gatchalian
2022	First Lady	Andrea Marquez-Salcedo
2023	Voltes V: Legacy	Dr. Mary Ann Armstrong
2023	Black Rider	Becky
2023–2024	Stolen Life	Lucilla "Lucy" Hidalgo-Rigor / Farrah Dela Cruz-Rigor
2024–2025	Widows' War	Georgina "George" Balay-Palacios

==== Anthologies ====
Year	Title	Role
2009	SRO Cinema Serye: Carinderia Queen	Juliet
2010	Love Bug Presents: The Last Romance	Rackie
2013	Magpakailanman: The Undying Love Story of Leonardo & Nonyx Buela	Nonyx Buela
2014	Magpakailanman: Sinapupunang Paupahan	Neneth Villegas
2016	Karelasyon: Pag-ibig na nakatadhana	Estela
2016	Karelasyon: Live-in Relationship	Miriam

==== Sitcoms ====
Year	Title	Role
2012	Pepito Manaloto: Ang Tunay na Kwento	Teacher Jenny
2013	Bubble Gang	
2014–16	Ismol Family	Majay Ismol
2016	Dear Uge: Acting Dyowa	Sarah

==== Hosting ====
Year	Title	Note
2009–2010	StarStruck V	Host
2010	Binibining Pilipinas 2010	Host
2010–2013	Party Pilipinas	Host / Performer
2011	Miss World Philippines 2011	Host
2012	Manny Many Prizes	Host
2012	Habili Ng Hari: Dolphy's Legacy Uncovered	Host
2012	Protégé: The Battle For The Big Artista Break	Host
2013–2015	Sunday All Stars	Host / Performer
2014–2018	Del Monte Kitchenomics	Host
2015–2017	Karelasyon	Host
2022	All-Out Sundays	Guest host / Performer

==== Modeling ====
Year	Title	Role
2010	Bench Uncut: A Bold Look at the Future	Herself/model

== Awards and nominations ==
Year	Award	Category	Nominated for	Result
2010	36th Metro Manila Film Festival	Best Actress	Shake, Rattle & Roll XII: Punerarya	Nominated
2010	24th PMPC Star Awards for TV	Best New Female TV Personality	Rosalinda	Won
2011	Young Critics Circle for Film	Best Performance	Shake, Rattle & Roll XII: Punerarya	Won
2011	27th PMPC Star Awards for Movies	Best New Movie Actress	Shake, Rattle & Roll XII: Punerarya	Won
2011	8th Golden Screen Awards	Breakthrough Performance by an Actress	Shake, Rattle & Roll XII: Punerarya	Nominated
2012	30th Luna Awards	Best Supporting Actress	My Neighbor's Wife	Nominated
2012	Yahoo OMG! Awards	Actress of the Year	None	Nominated
2012	FAMAS Awards	Best Actress	Manila Kingpin: The Asiong Salonga Story	Nominated
2013	27th PMPC Star Awards for Television	Best Drama Actress	My Husband's Lover	Nominated
2013	The PEP List 2013	Female TV Star of the Year	My Husband's Lover	Nominated
2014	Golden Screen Awards for Television	Outstanding Performance by an Actress in a Drama Series	My Husband's Lover	Won
2014	Yahoo! OMG Awards	Actress of the Year	None	Nominated
2014	40th Metro Manila Film Festival	Best Actress	Shake, Rattle & Roll XV: Ulam	Nominated
2016	2nd Alta Media Icon Awards	Best Comedy Actress for TV	Ismol Family	Won
