= Ismol Family =

Philippine television sitcom series

- Title card
- Genre: Sitcom
- Written by: Joseph Balboa
- Directed by: Dominic Zapata
- Creative director: Caesar Cosme
- Starring: Ryan Agoncillo; Carla Abellana
- Theme music composer: Jonathan Ong
- Opening theme: "Ang Saya Saya" by 1:43; "Kaching-Kaching" by Neo Domingo feat. Fifth Dynamics; "Ismol Family theme"
- Country of origin: Philippines
- Original language: Tagalog
- No. of episodes: 125

Production
- Executive producer: Roy R. San Luis
- Producer: Lilybeth G. Rasonable
- Production locations: Quezon City, Philippines
- Camera setup: Multiple-camera setup
- Running time: 25–38 minutes
- Production company: GMA Entertainment TV

Original release
- Network: GMA Network
- Release: June 22, 2014 – November 6, 2016

Ismol Family is a Philippine television sitcom series broadcast by GMA Network. Directed by Dominic Zapata, it stars Ryan Agoncillo and Carla Abellana. It premiered on June 22, 2014, on the network's Sunday Grande sa Gabi line up. The series concluded on November 6, 2016, with a total of 125 episodes.

The series is streaming online on YouTube.

== Cast and characters ==
Cast

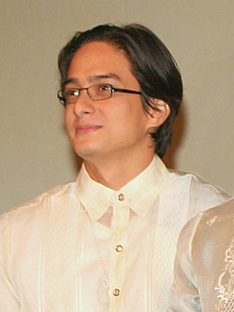
Ryan Agoncillo

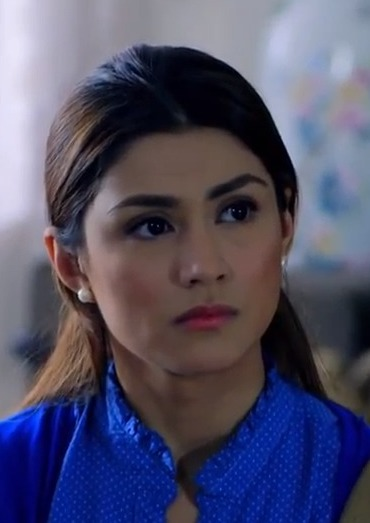
Carla Abellana

Lead cast

- Ryan Agoncillo as Jingo Ismol
- Carla Abellana as Majay Ismol

Supporting cast

- Marc Justine Alvarez as PJ Ismol
- Carmi Martin as Apolonia "Apple" Laqui
- Mikael Daez as Bernie
- Pekto as Roberto "Bobong" Laqui
- Bianca Umali as Yumi Laqui
- Miguel Tanfelix as Tan-Tan
- Kevin Santos as Lance
- Mahal as Big Boss
- Boobay as Lora
- Dello as himself
- James Teng as Nathan
- Bernadette Bansil as Dianne
- Pollana Villamor Tangco as Jackie
- Alvin Ronquillo as Yakkie
- Ashley Mendoza as Krippy
- Natalia Moon as Natalia
- Sky Teotico as Amboy

Recurring cast

- Lindsay de Vera as Kitten
- Roi Vinzon as Bernie's father
- Chanda Romero as China

== Ratings ==
According to AGB Nielsen Philippines' Mega Manila household television ratings, the pilot episode of Ismol Family earned a 17.4% rating. The final episode scored a 22.8% rating in Urban Luzon.

== Accolades ==
Accolades received by Ismol Family
Year	Award	Category	Recipient	Result	Ref.
2014	28th PMPC Star Awards for Television	Best Comedy Program	Ismol Family	Nominated	
2015	29th PMPC Star Awards for Television	Best Comedy Program	Ismol Family	Nominated	
2015	29th PMPC Star Awards for Television	Best Comedy Actor	Ryan Agoncillo	Nominated	
2015	29th PMPC Star Awards for Television	Best Comedy Actress	Carmi Martin	Nominated	
2015	Golden Screen TV Awards	Outstanding Comedy Program	Ismol Family	Nominated	
2015	Golden Screen TV Awards	Outstanding Supporting Actress in a Comedy Show	Carmi Martin	Won	
2015	Golden Screen TV Awards	Outstanding Breakthrough Performance by an Actress	Natalia Moon	Nominated	
2016	2nd Alta Media Icon Awards	Best Comedy Actress for TV	Carla Abellana	Won	
2016	30th PMPC Star Awards for Television	Best Comedy Program	Ismol Family	Nominated	
