= Rosalinda (Philippine TV series) =

2009 Philippine television drama series

- Title card
- Genre: Romantic drama
- Based on: Rosalinda (1999) by Delia Fiallo
- Developed by: R.J. Nuevas
- Directed by: Maryo J. de los Reyes; Gil Tejada Jr.
- Starring: Carla Abellana; Geoff Eigenmann
- Opening theme: "Ay Amor! (Umiibig si Rosalinda)" by La Diva
- Ending theme: "Himig" by Carla Abellana
- Country of origin: Philippines
- Original language: Tagalog
- No. of episodes: 105

Production
- Executive producer: Winnie Hollis-Reyes
- Production locations: Taal, Batangas; Quezon City
- Camera setup: Multiple-camera setup
- Running time: 30–45 minutes
- Production company: GMA Entertainment TV

Original release
- Network: GMA Network
- Release: July 6 – November 27, 2009

Rosalinda is a 2009 Philippine television drama romance series broadcast by GMA Network. The series is based on a 1999 Mexican television series of the same title. Directed by Maryo J. de los Reyes and Gil Tejada Jr., it stars Carla Abellana in the title role and Geoff Eigenmann. It premiered on July 6, 2009, on the network's Telebabad line up. The series concluded on November 27, 2009, with a total of 105 episodes.

== Cast and characters ==
Cast

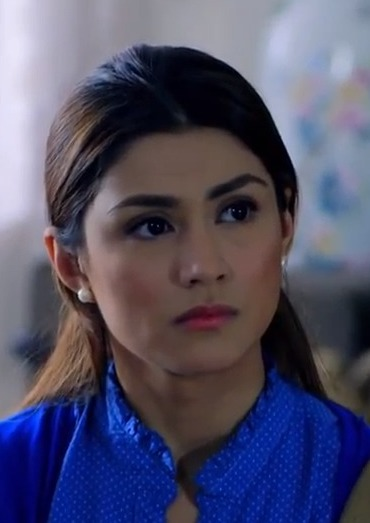
Carla Abellana

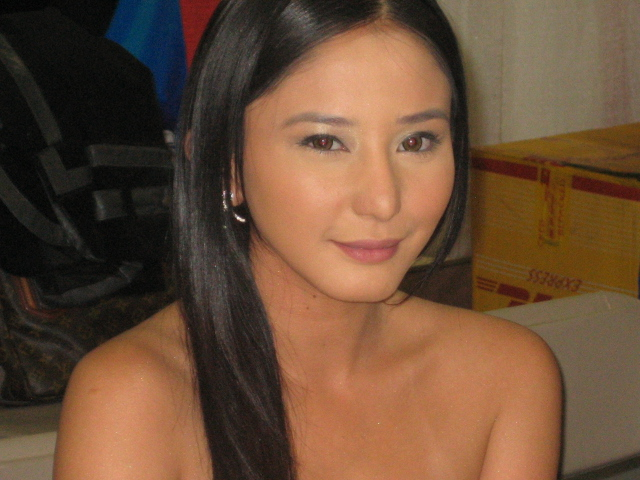
Katrina Halili

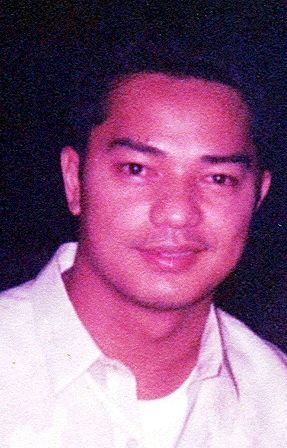
Ariel Rivera

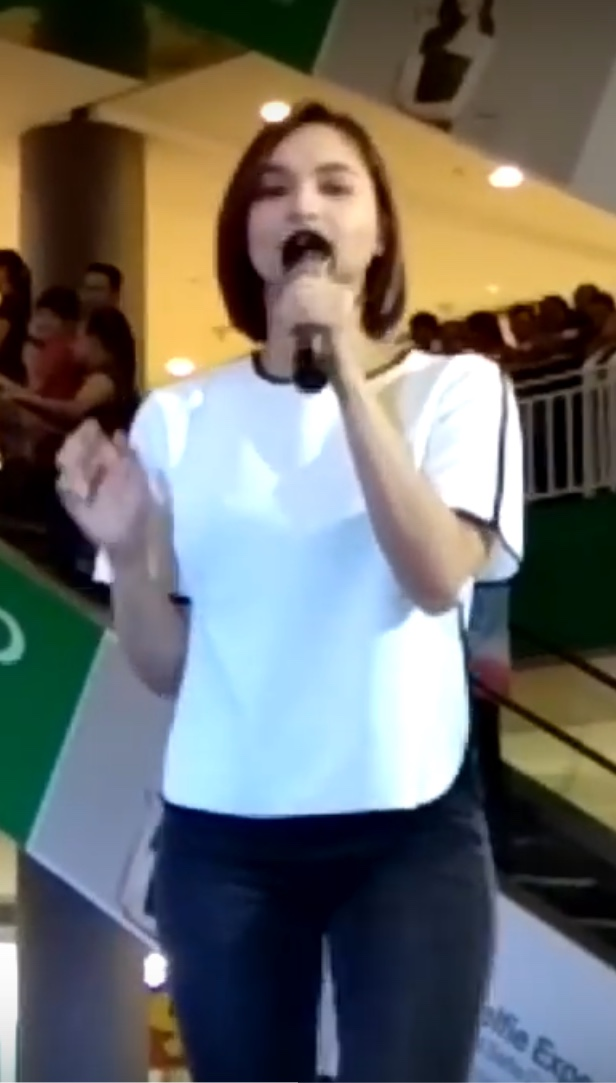
Ryza Cenon

Lead cast

- Carla Abellana as Rosalinda Perez-Altamirano / Rosalinda Del Castillo-Altamirano / Paloma Dorantes
- Geoff Eigenmann as Fernando Jose Salvador Altamirano

Supporting cast

- Katrina Halili as Fedra Perez
- Roderick Paulate as Florencio
- Sheryl Cruz as Valeria del Castillo-Altamirano
- Ariel Rivera as Alfredo Del Castillo
- Gary Estrada as Javier Perez
- Glydel Mercado as Soledad Romero
- Jessa Zaragoza as Evangelina Kintanar-del Castillo
- Yul Servo as Roberto
- Ryza Cenon as Abril Del Castillo
- Sherilyn Reyes as Dulce
- Mike Tan as Rico
- Mart Escudero as Beto Perez
- Sheena Halili as Becky
- Marco Alcaraz as Anibal
- Marky Lopez as Julio
- Carlene Aguilar as Rodora
- Ayen Munji-Laurel as Berta Alvarez / Delia
- Gian Magdangal as Gerardo De Navarette
- Krystal Reyes as Lucy Perez
- Jomari Yllana as Alessandro Durantes
- Jackie Lou Blanco as Veronica Salvador Altamirano
- Sheree Bautista as Natalia

Guest cast

- Carlos Morales as Jose Fernando Altamirano
- Jennifer Sevilla as Dolores Romero Perez
- Mymy Davao as Clarita
- Isabel Oli as Austerica Carvajal
- Bernard Palanca as Allan
- Ana Capri as a client of a mental hospital
- Charlie Davao as Victor Durantes
- Bebs Hollmann as Pamela
- Chelsea Eugenio as younger Rosalinda
- Francheska Salcedo as younger Fedra

== Development ==
Rosalinda is a Mexican telenovela that was aired in 1999 on Televisa. Created by Delia Fiallo, it starred singer-actress Thalía in the title role. The Mexican series was aired in the Philippines in 2000 through ABS-CBN, and later became the most popular telenovela in the Philippines after Marimar. The network acquired the rights in 2007.

== Production ==
Principal photography commenced on June 8, 2009. Filming took place in Taal, Batangas and Quezon City. Filming concluded on November 18, 2009.

== Ratings ==
According to AGB Nielsen Philippines' Mega Manila household television ratings, the pilot episode of Rosalinda earned a 26.3% rating. The final episode scored a 27% rating.

== Accolades ==
Accolades received by Rosalinda
Year	Award	Category	Recipient	Result	Ref.
2010	24th PMPC Star Awards for Television	Best New Female TV Personality	Carla Abellana	Nominated	
