= So It's You =

- Theatrical release poster
- Directed by: Jun Lana
- Written by: Jun Lana
- Produced by: Lily Y. Monteverde; Roselle Y. Monteverde
- Starring: Carla Abellana; Tom Rodriguez; JC de Vera
- Cinematography: Carlo Mendoza
- Edited by: Benjamin Tolentino
- Music by: Von de Guzman
- Production companies: Regal Entertainment; Regal Multimedia Inc.
- Distributed by: GMA Films
- Release date: May 7, 2014
- Country: Philippines
- Languages: Filipino; English
- Box office: ₱25,513,397.00

So It's You is a 2014 Filipino romantic comedy film starring Carla Abellana, Tom Rodriguez and JC de Vera. It is written and directed by Jun Lana. It was released on May 7, 2014, by Regal Entertainment.

The film is about a pair of broken-hearted people who meet and begin a relationship, but their painful pasts hang over their romance.

== Synopsis ==
Lira (Carla Abellana) was left at the altar by her fiancée Tony (JC de Vera). Cobbler Goryo (Tom Rodriguez) has just given up hope on getting back together with the mother of his child. The two meet by chance, and come to bond over their respective heartbreak. Goryo agrees to pose as Lira’s boyfriend in hopes of making her now-married former fiancée jealous. Things get complicated when the two start falling in over for real, even as Lira continues to dream of reuniting with Tony.

== Cast ==
- Carla Abellana as Lira Joy Macaspac
- Tom Rodriguez as Goryo Acuyong
- JC de Vera as Tony Ferrer
- Bangs Garcia as Rose
- Leo Martinez as Tiyo Carding
- Joey Marquez as Dado
- Paolo Ballesteros as LA
- Kevin Santos as Jojo
- Arlene Muhlach as Ditas
- Marc Justine Alvarez as Nonoy
- Gee Canlas as Pauleen
- Patricia Ismael as Eva
- Ahwel Paz as Nurse

== See also ==
- List of Filipino films in 2014
