= Kung Aagawin Mo ang Langit =

Philippine television drama series

- Title card
- Also known as: Losing Heaven
- Genre: Romantic drama
- Created by: R.J. Nuevas
- Directed by: Joselito Altarejos
- Creative director: Jun Lana
- Starring: Carla Abellana; Michelle Madrigal; Mike Tan
- Theme music composer: Vehnee Saturno
- Opening theme: "Nasaan" by Jessa Zaragoza
- Country of origin: Philippines
- Original language: Tagalog
- No. of episodes: 100

Production
- Executive producer: Kaye Atienza-Cadsawan
- Camera setup: Multiple-camera setup
- Running time: 22–27 minutes
- Production company: GMA Entertainment TV

Original release
- Network: GMA Network
- Release: September 19, 2011 – February 3, 2012

Kung Aagawin Mo ang Langit (transl. if you take away the heaven / international title: Losing Heaven) is a Philippine television drama romance series broadcast by GMA Network. Directed by Jay Altajeros, it stars Carla Abellana, Michelle Madrigal and Mike Tan. It premiered on September 19, 2011 on the network's Dramarama sa Hapon line up. The series concluded on February 3, 2012, with a total of 100 episodes.

The series is streaming online on YouTube.

== Cast and characters ==
Cast

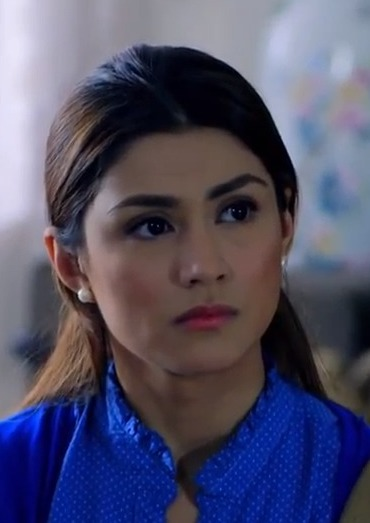
Carla Abellana

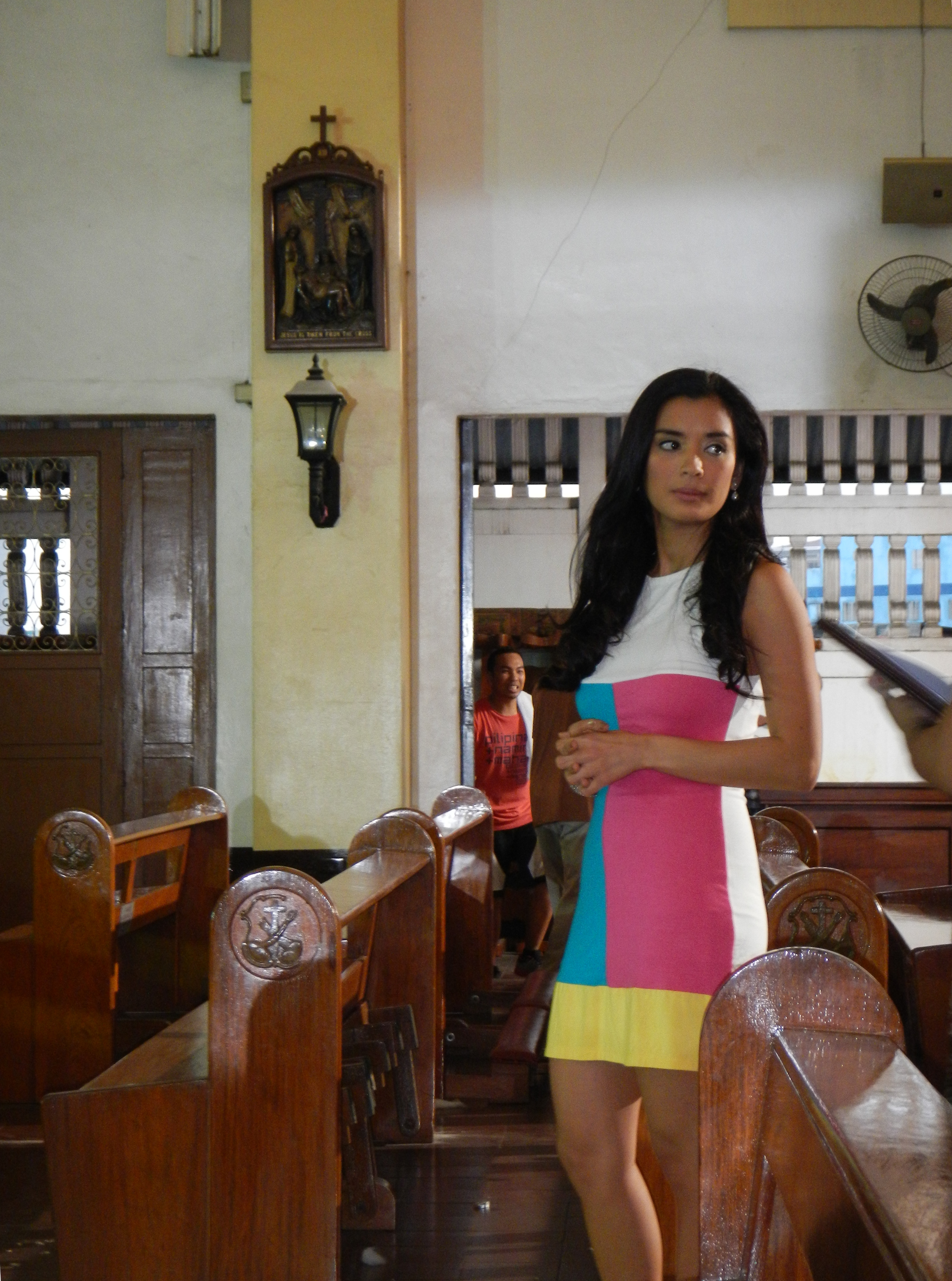
Michelle Madrigal

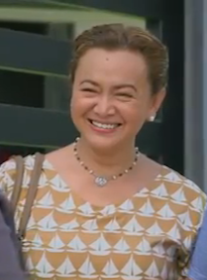
Sharmaine Buencamino

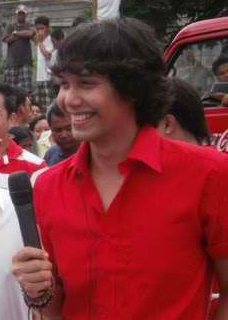
Paolo Ballesteros

Lead cast

- Carla Abellana as Ellery Martinez-Alejandro
- Michelle Madrigal as Bridgitte Q. Samonte
- Mike Tan as Jonas Alejandro

Supporting cast

- Ricky Davao as Delfin Martinez
- Shamaine Centenera-Buencamino as Marissa Martinez
- Ces Quesada as Leila Quintana
- Kevin Santos as Lester Feliciano
- Paolo Ballesteros as Aloha
- Jan Marini as Sonia Tercero
- Will Devaughn as Waldy Buenafe
- Steph Henares as Janice Baluarte
- Rochelle Barrameda as Cecile Quintana-Samonte
- Frank Garcia as Donald Salvacion
- RJ Salvador as Jojo Samonte
- Elijah Alejo as Samantha Martinez Alejandro
- Rich Asuncion as Nadia
- Frank Magalona as Enrico Fernandez

Guest cast

- Dianne Hernandez as Jenna Quirante
- Candace Kucsulain as Monique Hilario
- Crispin Pineda as Dante Morales
- Ross Fernando as younger Jonas
- Christopher de Leon as Jonas' dad
- Andrea Torres as Justin

== Ratings ==
According to AGB Nielsen Philippines' Mega Manila household television ratings, the pilot episode of Kung Aagawin Mo ang Langit earned a 13.9% rating. The final episode scored a 25.2% rating.
