= Juan Happy Love Story =

2016 Philippine television drama series

- Title card
- Genre: Drama; Romantic comedy
- Created by: Denoy Navarro-Punio
- Written by: Marlon Miguel; John Kenneth De Leon; Tina Velasco
- Directed by: L.A. Madridejos
- Creative director: Roy Iglesias
- Starring: Dennis Trillo; Heart Evangelista
- Narrated by: Papa Dudut
- Opening theme: "Ako'y Kasama Mo" by Dennis Trillo and Heart Evangelista
- Country of origin: Philippines
- Original language: Tagalog
- No. of episodes: 80 (list of episodes)

Production
- Executive producer: Darling Pulido-Torres
- Producer: Mavic Tagbo
- Production locations: Quezon City, Philippines
- Cinematography: Jay Linao
- Editors: Benedict Lavastida; Robert Pancho; Nikka Olayvar; Debbie Robete
- Camera setup: Multiple-camera setup
- Running time: 25–38 minutes
- Production company: GMA Entertainment TV

Original release
- Network: GMA Network
- Release: May 16 – September 2, 2016

Juan Happy Love Story is a 2016 Philippine television drama comedy romance series broadcast by GMA Network. Directed by L.A. Madridejos, it stars Dennis Trillo and Heart Evangelista. It premiered on May 16, 2016 on the network's Telebabad line up. The series concluded on September 2, 2016, with a total of 80 episodes.

The series is streaming online on YouTube.

== Premise ==
The story revolves around Juan dela Costa and Happy. The two meet each other when Juan rescue Happy from a thief. Their romance leads to a wedding. Their relationship with their families is opposed and the couple can't have child on their own, so they decided to adopt one instead.

== Cast and characters ==
Cast

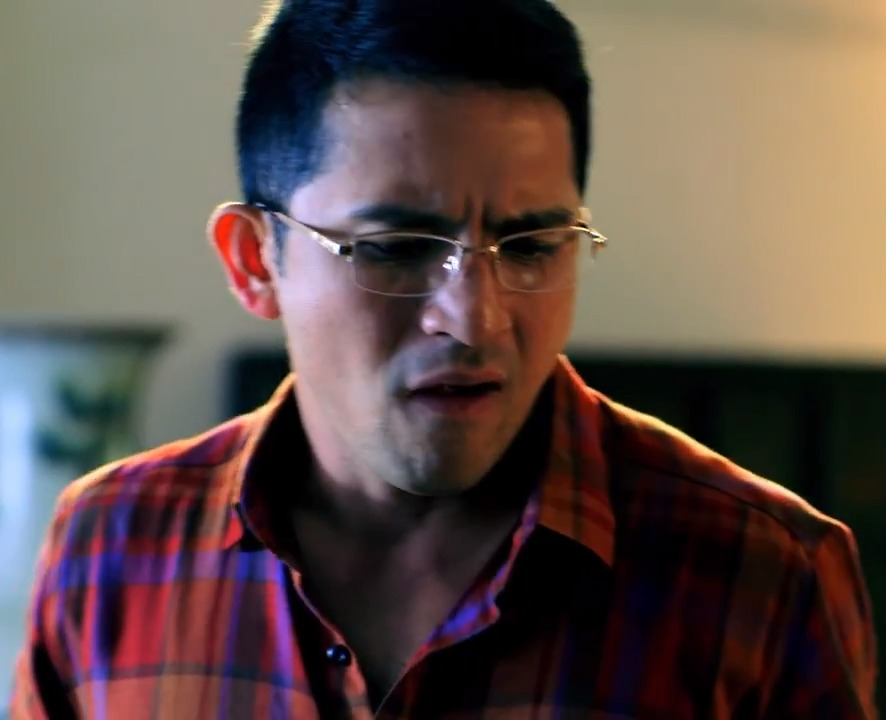
Dennis Trillo

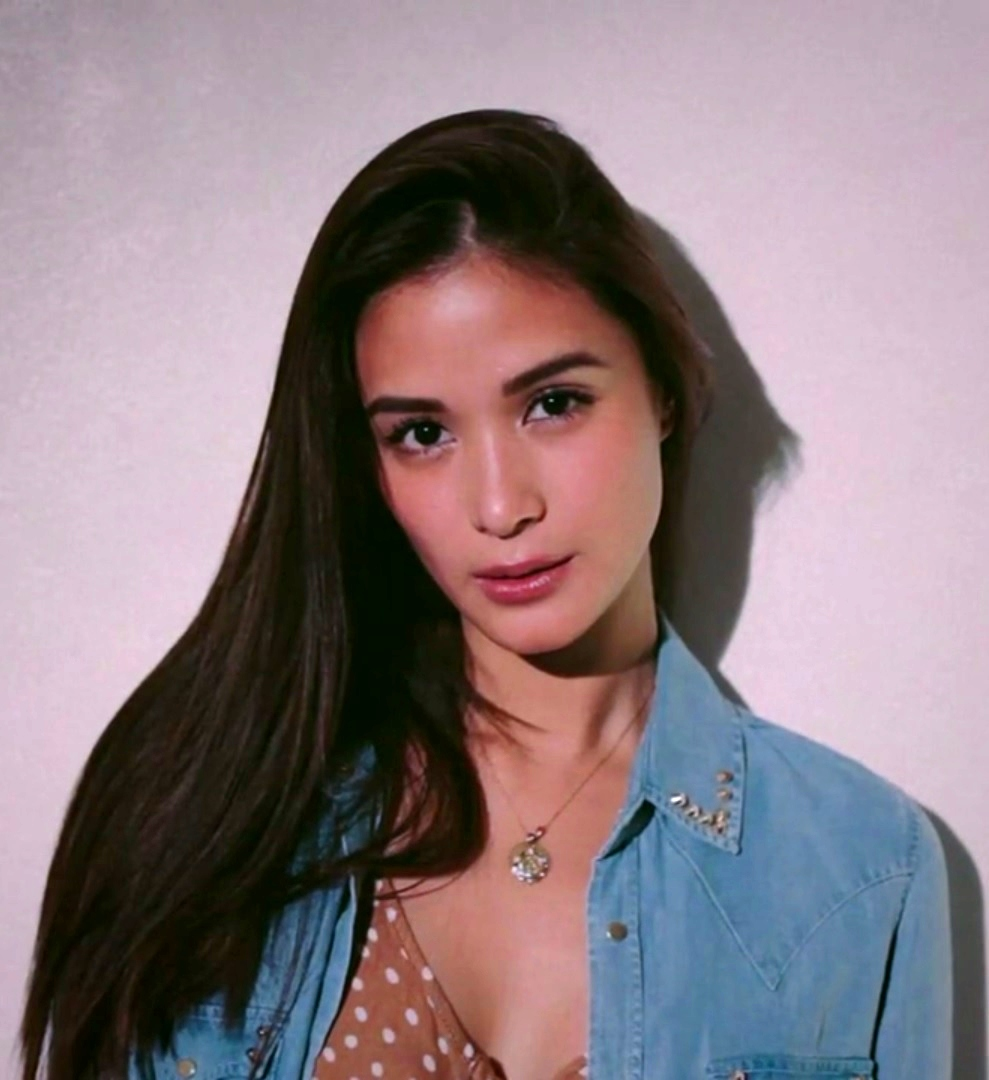
Heart Evangelista

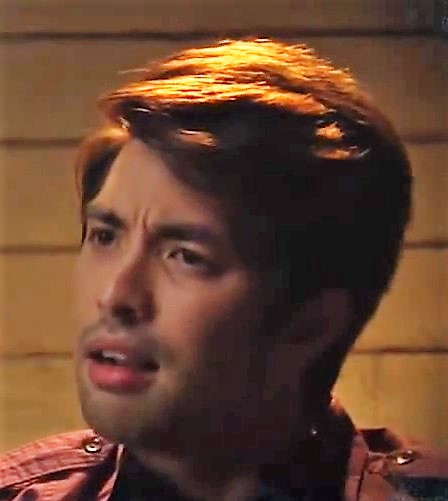
Joross Gamboa

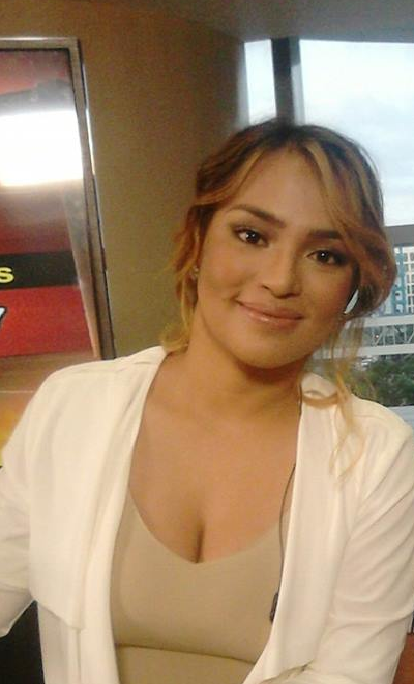
Erika Padilla

Lead cast

- Dennis Trillo as Juan dela Costa, Jr.
- Heart Evangelista as Happy Villanueva-Dela Costa

Supporting cast

- Gloria Romero as Imelda "Mameng" Valencia-dela Costa
- Nick Lizaso as Carlos "Caloy" dela Costa
- Lotlot de Leon as Marissa "Isay" Canlas-Villanueva
- Gardo Versoza as Rodrigo "Boyong" Villanueva
- Erika Padilla as Joy Villanueva-Agustin
- Dominic Roco as Henry Agustin
- Vincent Magbanua as Lucky Villanueva
- Joross Gamboa as Robert "Bob" Agoncillo
- Kim Domingo as Agatha Samaniego
- Rob Moya as Kyle Ignacio
- Leanne Bautista as Katrina Cassandra "Katkat" Dela Costa-Arboleda

Recurring cast

- Koreen Medina as Lorraine Ignacio
- Arianne Bautista as Sahlee Perez
- Ashley Cabrera as Lenlen Villanueva Agustin
- Vince Gamad as Glenn
- Papa Dudut as a narrator / taxi driver
- Judie dela Cruz as Michelle
- Kiel Rodriguez as Clinton
- Matet de Leon as Didit Dimalinlang
- Carla Humphries as Sabrina Moran
- Keanna Reeves as Evelyn Samaniego

Guest cast

- Mickey Ferriols as Jarina dela Costa
- Carl Acosta as younger Juan
- Pauline Mendoza as teenage Happy
- Sheree Bautista as Lucy
- Pen Medina as Danny
- Jinri Park as Lyla
- Arielle Arida as Maganda
- Stephanie Sol as Dorcas
- June Macasaet as Malakas
- Debbie Garcia as Pia
- Teresita Gonzales as Mrs. Cumbiado
- Rolando Inocencio as Kapitan
- Kim Last as Alex
- Mariam Al-alawi as Ava
- Carl Cervantes as Rasul
- Faith da Silva as Adarna
- Carla Abellana as older Katkat

== Ratings ==
Juan Happy Love Story ratings
Episode	Original air date	AGB Nielsen Mega Manila Households Television Homes			Ref.
Episode	Original air date	Rating	Timeslot rank	Primetime rank	Ref.
1	May 16, 2016	17.1%	#1	#6	
2	May 17, 2016	17.2%	#1	#6	
3	May 18, 2016	16.2%	#1	#4	
4	May 19, 2016	15.8%	#1	#6	
5	May 20, 2016	15.8%	#1	#6	
6	May 23, 2016	15.9%	#1	#7	
7	May 24, 2016	16.0%	#1	#7	
8	May 25, 2016	15.8%	#1	#7	
9	May 26, 2016	17.1%	#1	#6	
10	May 27, 2016	16.5%	#1	#6	
11	May 30, 2016	14.3%	#1	#7	
12	May 31, 2016	15.2%	#1	#7	
13	June 1, 2016	14.5%	#1	#6	
14	June 2, 2016	17.6%	#1	#5	
15	June 3, 2016	18.7%	#1	#5	
16	June 6, 2016	14.8%	#1	#7	
17	June 7, 2016	15.3%	#1	#7	
18	June 8, 2016	15.4%	#1	#6	
19	June 9, 2016	17.1%	#1	#6	
20	June 10, 2016	19.0%	#1	#5	
21	June 13, 2016	17.1%	#1	#6	
22	June 14, 2016	17.5%	#1	#6	
23	June 15, 2016	16.7%	#1	#6	
24	June 16, 2016	17.0%	#1	#6	
25	June 17, 2016	16.2%	#1	#6	
26	June 20, 2016	15.7%	#1	#7	
27	June 21, 2016	16.6%	#1	#6	
28	June 22, 2016	14.7%	#1	#7	
29	June 23, 2016	16.2%	#1	#6	
30	June 24, 2016	16.8%	#1	#6	
31	June 27, 2016	14.5%	#1	#7	
32	June 28, 2016	16.3%	#1	#6	
33	June 29, 2016	15.8%	#1	#7	
34	June 30, 2016	16.5%	#1	#7	
35	July 1, 2016	15.4%	#1	#7	
36	July 4, 2016	14.9%	#1	#7	
37	July 5, 2016	12.6%	#1	#7	
38	July 6, 2016	12.7%	#1	#7	
39	July 7, 2016	14.4%	#1	#7	
40	July 8, 2016	17.1%	#1	#7	
41	July 11, 2016	13.5%	#2	#8	
42	July 12, 2016	13.8%	#1	#7	
43	July 13, 2016	13.7%	#2	#8	
44	July 14, 2016	14.9%	#1	#7	
45	July 15, 2016	18.0%	#1	#7	
46	July 18, 2016	16.5%	#1	#7	
47	July 19, 2016	15.8%	#1	#7	
48	July 20, 2016	14.9%	#1	#7	
49	July 21, 2016	15.8%	#1	#7	
50	July 22, 2016	18.0%	#1	#6	
51	July 25, 2016	15.4%	#1	#7	
52	July 26, 2016	15.7%	#1	#7	
53	July 27, 2016	15.4%	#1	#7	
54	July 28, 2016	15.2%	#1	#7	
55	July 29, 2016	17.5%	#1	#7	
56	August 1, 2016	14.5%	#1	#7	
57	August 2, 2016	15.2%	#1	#7	
58	August 3, 2016	14.3%	#1	#7	
59	August 4, 2016	15.1%	#1	#7	
60	August 5, 2016	17.0%	#1	#7	
61	August 8, 2016	14.6%	#1	#7	
62	August 9, 2016	15.3%	#1	#7	
63	August 10, 2016	15.5%	#1	#7	
64	August 11, 2016	15.6%	#1	#6	
65	August 12, 2016	18.2%	#1	#7	
66	August 15, 2016	13.7%	#1	#7	
67	August 16, 2016	15.1%	#1	#7	
68	August 17, 2016	15.5%	#1	#6	
69	August 18, 2016	17.3%	#1	#7	
70	August 19, 2016	19.1%	#1	#6	
71	August 22, 2016	15.9%	#1	#7	
72	August 23, 2016	15.0%	#1	#7	
73	August 24, 2016	15.3%	#1	#7	
74	August 25, 2016	15.8%	#1	#7	
75	August 26, 2016	16.3%	#1	#7	
76	August 29, 2016				
77	August 30, 2016	17.0%	#1	#7	
78	August 31, 2016	17.1%	#1	#7	
79	September 1, 2016	16.5%	#1	#7	
80	September 2, 2016	17.3%	#1	#7	

== Production ==
Principal photography commenced in March 2016.
