= Karelasyon =

Philippine television drama series

- Title card
- Genre: Romantic drama
- Presented by: Carla Abellana
- Country of origin: Philippines
- Original language: Tagalog
- No. of episodes: 108 (list of episodes)

Production
- Camera setup: Multiple-camera setup
- Running time: 22–34 minutes
- Production company: GMA News and Public Affairs

Original release
- Network: GMA Network
- Release: April 11, 2015 – May 13, 2017

Karelasyon (transl. relationship) is a Philippine television drama romance anthology series broadcast by GMA Network. Hosted by Carla Abellana, it premiered on April 11, 2015 on the network's Sabado Star Power line up. The series concluded on May 13, 2017, with a total of 108 episodes.

The series is streaming online on YouTube.

== Episodes ==
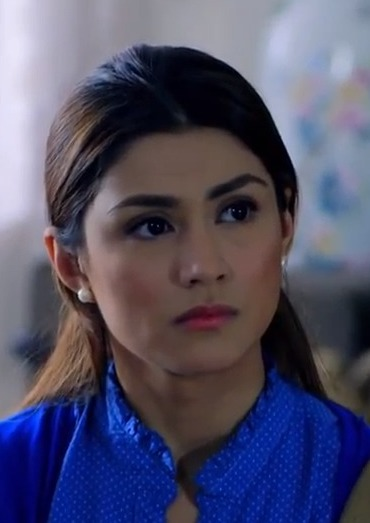
Carla Abellana serves as a host.

== Ratings ==
According to AGB Nielsen Philippines' Mega Manila household television ratings, the pilot episode of Karelasyon earned a 16.5% rating. The final episode scored a 5.2% rating in Nationwide Urban Television Audience Measurement People in television homes.

== Accolades ==
Accolades received by Karelasyon
Year	Award	Category	Recipient	Result	Ref.
2015	29th PMPC Star Awards for Television	Best Drama Anthology	Karelasyon	Nominated	
2015	29th PMPC Star Awards for Television	Best Single Performance by an Actress	Nora Aunor ("Tres Rosas")	Nominated	
2016	30th PMPC Star Awards for Television	Best Drama Anthology	Karelasyon	Nominated	
2016	30th PMPC Star Awards for Television	Best Single Performance by an Actress	Jaclyn Jose ("Dahas")	Nominated	
2016	US International Film and Video Festival	Certificate for Creative Excellence (Docudrama category)	“Tres Rosas”	Won	
2017	31st PMPC Star Awards for Television	Best Drama Anthology	Karelasyon	Nominated	
2017	31st PMPC Star Awards for Television	Best Single Performance by an Actor	Dennis Trillo ("Ang Pagiging Preso ni Salby")	Nominated	
2017	31st PMPC Star Awards for Television	Best Single Performance by an Actress	Rochelle Pangilinan ("My Brother's Dark Secret")	Nominated	
2018	32nd PMPC Star Awards for Television	Best Drama Anthology	Karelasyon	Nominated	
2019	33rd PMPC Star Awards for Television	Best Drama Anthology	Karelasyon	Nominated	
2021	34th PMPC Star Awards for Television	Best Drama Anthology	Karelasyon	Nominated	
