= Iza Calzado on screen and stage =

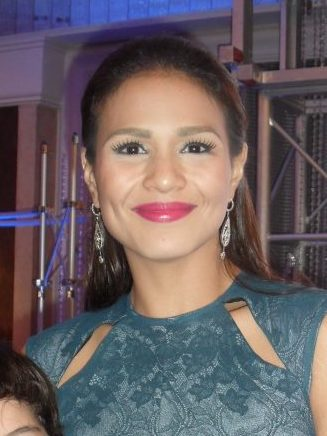

Iza Calzado is a Filipina actress who has had an extensive career in film, television and stage. She is known primarily for her dramatic performances in period drama, psychological thriller, supernatural horror and fantasy. She made her acting debut in the 2002 drama Kung Mawawala Ka. She landed her first leading role in the romantic drama Te Amo, Maging Sino Ka Man (2004) opposite Argentine actor Segundo Cernadas. She received acclaim for her early roles in films such as Milan (2004), Sabel (2004) and Sigaw (2004), where she won Best Supporting Actress at the Gawad Urian Awards for the latter. She had her breakthrough in the fantasy Encantadia as Amihan. She reprised the same role in the succeeding sequels Etheria, Pag-Ibig Hanggang Wakas and Mulawin: The Movie.

This was followed with starring roles in the period dramas Moments of Love (2006) and Eternity (2006) opposite Dingdong Dantes. She also starred in the supernatural horror Ouija (2007) for which she received a Star Awards for Movies nomination and Shake, Rattle and Roll 8 (2006) where she received a Best Actress nomination at the Metro Manila Film Festival. Following her starring roles in a number of romantic dramas such as Batanes: Sa Dulo ng Walang Hanggan (2007) opposite Taiwanese actor Ken Chu and One True Love (2008) for which she won her first Luna Award, Calzado established herself as a leading actress in soap operas and received acclaim for her portrayal in Atlantika (2006), Impostora (2007), Joaquin Bordado (2008), All About Eve (2009) and Beauty Queen (2010).

Calzado appeared in a string of comedies such as Desperadas (2007), Yaya and Angelina: The Spoiled Brat Movie (2009), Fuchsia (2009) and Working Girls (2010), including the sitcom Andres de Saya opposite Cesar Montano. For her performance as an activist in Joel Lamangan's crime drama Dukot (2009), she received Best Actress nominations at the FAMAS, Gawad Urian and Star Awards for Movies. She has since starred in numerous critically acclaimed and commercially successful films such as Mga Mumunting Lihim (2012), Starting Over Again (2014), Etiquette for Mistresses (2015), Haunted Mansion (2015), Buhay Habambuhay (2016),Bliss (2017) for which she won an Osaka Asian Film Festival Award for Best Actress, Mystified (2019) for which she won an Asian Television Award, Pandanggo sa Hukay (2019) and Culion (2019).

Calzado continued to star in dramas through soap operas in television including Kahit Puso’y Masugatan (2012), Hawak Kamay (2014), A Love to Last (2017), Ngayon at Kailanman (2018), Ang sa Iyo ay Akin (2020) and Mars Ravelo's Darna (2022). Apart from acting, Calzado has also presented various programs on television such as 3R (Respect, Relax, Respond) (2005), At Your Service: Star Power (2005), Eat Bulaga! (2011) and The Biggest Loser Pinoy Edition: Doubles (2014). In 2015, she made her stage debut in the play Sabel: Love and Passion. Her films have collectively earned ₱1.96 billion, making her one of the highest-grossing Filipino box office stars this century.

== Film ==
Iza Calzado's film credits with year of release, film titles and roles
Year	Title	Role	Notes	Ref(s).
1989	Mahirap ang Magmahal	Unnamed	Bit roles	
1990	Kung Tapos Na Ang Kailanman	Unnamed	Bit roles	
2004	Milan	Mary Grace		
2004	Annie B.	Tricia		
2004	Sabel	Jenny		
2004	Sigaw	Anna		
2005	Pinoy/Blonde	Yanni		
2005	Ispiritista: Itay, May Moomoo!	Linda		
2005	Mulawin: The Movie	Reyna Amihan		
2006	Moments of Love	Divina Buenacer		
2006	Eternity	Milagros		
2006	Shake, Rattle and Roll 8	Cecille	Segment: "Yaya"	
2007	Blackout	Belen		
2007	Mona: Singapore Escort	Mona		
2007	Ouija	Sandra		
2007	Batanes: Sa Dulo ng Walang Hanggan	Pam		
2007	Desperadas	Stephanie		
2008	One True Love	Bella		
2008	Scaregiver	Marsha		
2008	Desperadas 2	Stephanie		
2008	The Echo	Gina		
2009	Sundo	Vanessa	Cameo appearance	
2009	Fuchsia	Elizabeth		
2009	Bente	Dina		
2009	Yaya and Angelina: The Spoiled Brat Movie	Eve		
2009	Ang Panday	Maria Makiling		
2009	Dukot (Desaparecidos)	Maricel Salvacruz		
2010	Working Girls	Theresa "Tere" Villanueva		
2010	White House	Stella/Black Lady		
2010	HIV: Si Heidi, Si Ivy at Si V	Ivy		
2011	Ang Panday 2	Maria Makiling		
2012	Mga Mumunting Lihim	Carla		
2013	Barber's Tales	Cecilla		
2013	Bekikang: Ang Nanay Kong Beki	The Doctor	Cameo appearance	
2014	Starting Over Again	Patricia "Patty" De Guia		
2014	Maria Leonora Teresa	Faith Pardo		
2014	Somebody to Love	Marga Castro		
2015	Etiquette for Mistresses	Stella Garcia		
2015	Haunted Mansion	Amara Lobregat		
2016	Showdown in Manila	Sabio		
2016	Buhay Habangbuhay	Sandy		
2016	My Candidate	Vera Sanchez		
2016	Die Beautiful	Herself	Cameo appearance	
2017	Ilawod	Kathy		
2017	Bliss	Jane Ciego		
2017	Seven Sundays	Juliana Smith	Cameo appearance	
2018	Distance	Liza		
2019	Mystified	Adela		
2019	Pandanggo sa Hukay	Elena		
2019	Culion	Ana		
2023	Shake, Rattle & Roll Extreme	Ingrid Salvador	Segment: "Glitch"	
2024	Lolo and the Kid	Sandra		
2024	Green Bones	Joanna "Jo" Zamora-Pineda		
2024	The Kingdom	Rosa		
2025	The Caretakers	Audrey		

== Television ==
Iza Calzado's television credits with year of release, title(s) and role
Year	Title	Role	Notes	Ref(s)
2002	Click	Patty	Guest	
2002	Kung Mawawala Ka	Phoebe Tuazon		
2002	All My Love	Lisa Estrada	Voice actor	
2004	Te Amo, Maging Sino Ka Man	Rosela Atilado		
2005	Love to Love	Trisha Rogelio	Episode: "Sweet Exchange"	
2005	3R (Respect, Relax, Respond)	Host		
2005	At Your Service: Star Power	Host		
2005	Encantadia	Amihan		
2005	Etheria: Ang Ikalimang Kaharian ng Encantadia	Amihan		
2006	Encantadia: Pag-Ibig Hanggang Wakas	Amihan		
2006	Magpakailanman	Mark's girlfriend	Episode: "Mark Tupaz of Shamrock Story"	
2006	Atlantika	Amaya/Cielo		
2007	Magpakailanman	Rebecca	Episode: "Paano Ba Maging Ina?"	
2007	Mga Kwento ni Lola Basyang	Prinsesa Isabella	Episode: "Ang Prinsipeng Mahaba ang Ilong"	
2007	Magpakailanman	Young Rosa Rosal	Episode: "The Rosa Rosal Story"	
2007	Impostora	Lara Carreon / Sara Carreon		
2008	Joaquin Bordado	Sofia Apacible / Carol Aguila		
2008	E.S.P.	Cassandra		
2008	Obra	Various roles	Episodes: "Sanib", "Beauty Queer", "Boksingera" & "Stella"	
2008	LaLola	Sera Romina		
2009	All About Eve	Nicole Gonzales		
2009	SRO Cinemaserye	Rowena Joy/RJ		
2009	Sine Novela: Kaya Kong Abutin ang Langit	Clarissa Rosales / Clarisse Gardamonte		
2009	StarStruck V	Council		
2010	Panday Kids	Maria Makiling		
2010	Healthy Cravings	Host		
2010	Claudine	Teresa		
2010	Pilyang Kerubin	Sandra Esteban		
2010	The Sweet Life	Host		
2010	Beauty Queen	Maita San Miguel-Sandoval		
2010	Party Pilipinas	Host/Performer		
2011	I Heart You, Pare!	Tonette / Tonya		
2011	Andres de Saya	Matilde Golpe de Oro		
2011	Eat Bulaga!	Host		
2011	Showbiz Exclusives	Host		
2012	Maalaala Mo Kaya	Liza	Episode: "Cross-stitch"	
2012	Kris TV	Guest		
2012	Maalaala Mo Kaya	Rosalyn	Episode: "Komiks"	
2012	Kahit Puso'y Masugatan	Andrea San Jose		
2013	The Buzz	Guest		
2013	Toda Max	Ka Iza		
2013	Maalaala Mo Kaya	Rowena	Episode: "Ilog"	
2013	Kris TV	Guest		
2013	Muling Buksan ang Puso	Young Elvira Santelices		
2014	The Biggest Loser Pinoy Edition: Doubles	Host		
2014	Hawak Kamay	Atty. Bianca Magpantay-Agustin		
2015	FPJ's Ang Probinsyano	Col. Olivia Buenaventura		
2017	A Love to Last	Grace Silverio-Noble		
2018	Ngayon at Kailanman	Rebecca Marquez-Young		
2020	Ang sa Iyo ay Akin	Ellice Ceñidoza-Villarosa	Main Cast	
2020	Loving Emily	Emily		
2020	The Battle of Brody and Brandy	Barbara Antonia "Brandy" Zulueta		
2021	Maalaala Mo Kaya	Caridad	Episode: "Medalya"	
2022	Mars Ravelo's Darna	Zora/Leonor Custodio/The first Darna		
2022	K-Love	Patricia San Juan		
2025	Maalaala Mo Kaya	Marissa	Episode: "Gumamela"	
2026	Someone, Someday	Olive Cariño	Guest	

== Stage ==
Year	Title	Role(s)	Date & Venue	Ref(s)
2015	Sabel: Love and Passion	Narrator/Adult Sabel	The Theater at Solaire (April 30) & Music Museum (June 26 & 27)	
2024	Tiny Beautiful Things	Sugar	Power Mac Center Spotlight Black Box Theater (November 16 to December 8)	

== See also ==
- List of awards and nominations received by Iza Calzado
