= List of awards and nominations received by Iza Calzado =

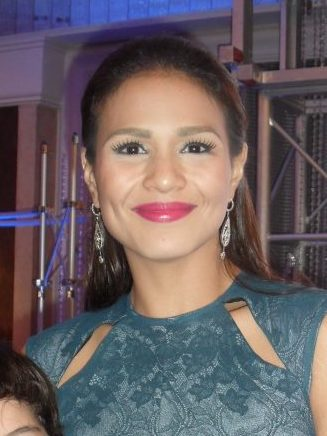
Calzado in 2014

Iza Calzado is a Filipino actress and television personality who has received multiple awards and nominations throughout her career, including an Osaka Asian Film Festival, an Asian Television Award, a Gawad Urian Award, a Luna Award, three Metro Manila Film Festival Awards, three Golden Screen Awards, an Ani ng Dangal Award, two Cinemalaya Independent Film Festival and three Box Office Entertainment Awards, in addition to nominations for five FAMAS Awards and six PMPC Star Awards for Television. In 2011, she was inducted into the Eastwood City Walk of Fame for her contributions to Philippine entertainment industry.

Calzado initially played bit roles in two motion pictures as a child actress. After taking a long break from the show business, she returned in 2002 through the drama Kung Mawawala Ka. For her film debut Milan (2004), she won a Box Office Entertainment Awards for Most Promising Female Star and a Golden Screen Award for Breakthrough Performance by an Actress. For the supernatural horror Sigaw (2004), she received a Gawad Urian Award for Best Supporting Actress. In 2008, she earned a Best Supporting Actress nomination at the Star Awards for Movies for Ouija and Best Actress at the Metro Manila Film Festival for Ang Panday the following year. For the film Dukot (2009), Calzado received her first FAMAS Award for Best Actress nomination, including nominations for a Gawad Urian and Star Awards for Movies. In 2011, she won her first Luna Award for her performance in One True Love (2008). The same year, Calzado won Best New Wave Actress at the Metro Manila Film Festival for her role in HIV: Si Heidi, si Ivy at si V.

For Jose Javier Reyes' Mga Mumunting Lihim, Calzado received two major awards at the 8th Cinemalaya Independent Film Festival. She scored her second FAMAS Award nomination in 2012 for the sequel Ang Panday 2. The same year, she won Best Female Emcee at the Aliw Awards and received the coveted Dekada Award at the Golden Screen Awards the following year. In 2014, she received a nomination for Best Reality Show Host for her stint in the program The Biggest Loser Pinoy Edition: Doubles at the Star Awards for TV. In 2015, Calzado received acclaim for her role in Starting Over Again (2014) where she won Film Actress of the Year at the Box Office Entertainment Awards and Best Supporting Actress at the Gawad Pasado Awards, in addition to nominations for a FAMAS and Gawad Urian.

For her role in Haunted Mansion (2015), she received a nomination for Best Supporting Actress at the Metro Manila Film Festival. Her performance in Etiquette for Mistresses also earned a nomination for Movie Actress of the Year at the Star Awards for Movies while her portrayal in A Love to Last also received a nomination for Best Drama Supporting Actress at the Star Awards for TV. In 2017, Calzado received widespread acclaim in the thriller Bliss. For her performance, she won the coveted Yakushi Pearl for Best Performance at the Osaka Asian Film Festival, Movie Actress of the Year at the Star Awards for Movies and her second Film Actress of the Year win at the Box Office Entertainment Awards. Her portrayal in the drama Ngayon at Kailanman (2018) earned Calzado a Best Actress win at the Gawad Tanglaw Awards.

In 2019, Calzado won the Jury Award for Best Performance for her performances in the films Culion and Pandanggo sa Hukay. Calzado reunited with Sunshine Dizon, Karylle and Diana Zubiri for the fantasy Mystified (2019). The film won Best Single Drama or Telemovie at the Asian Television Awards. In 2020, her performance in Tagpuan earned her a nomination for Best Actress at the Metro Manila Film Festival.

== Awards and nominations ==
Awards and nominations received by Iza Calzado
Award (Note: Awards, festivals, honors and other miscellaneous organizations are listed in alphabetical order.)	Year (Note: Indicates the year of ceremony. Each year is linked to the article about the awards held that year, wherever possible.)	Category	Nominated work	Result	Ref.
Aliw Awards	2012	Best Female Emcee	Herself	Won	
Aliw Awards	2024	Best Lead Actress in a Play	Tiny Beautiful Things	Nominated	
Asia Model Awards	2007	Model Star Award	Herself	Won	
Asian Television Awards	2020	Best Digital Program Series	Mystified	Nominated	
Asian Television Awards	2020	Best Single Drama or Telemovie	Mystified	Won	
Asian Television Awards	2024	Best Leading Female Performance — Digital	K-Love	Nominated	
Box Office Entertainment Awards	2004	Most Promising Female Star	Milan	Won	
Box Office Entertainment Awards	2014	Film Actress of the Year	Starting Over Again	Won	
Box Office Entertainment Awards	2018	Film Actress of the Year	Bliss	Won	
CineFilipino Film Festival	2016	Jury Award for Best Actress	Buhay Habambuhay	Nominated	
Cinemalaya Independent Film Festival	2012	Best Actress (Note: (shared with Judy Ann Santos, Janice de Belen & Agot Isidro))	Mga Mumunting Lihim	Won	
Cinemalaya Independent Film Festival	2012	Best Supporting Actress (Note: (shared with Judy Ann Santos, Janice de Belen & Agot Isidro))	Mga Mumunting Lihim	Won	
Eastwood City Walk of Fame	2011	Inductee	Herself	Won	
FAMAS Awards	2003	Speed's Best Dressed Female Star	Herself	Won	
FAMAS Awards	2010	Best Actress	Dukot	Nominated	
FAMAS Awards	2012	Best Supporting Actress	Ang Panday 2	Nominated	
FAMAS Awards	2015	Best Supporting Actress	Starting Over Again	Nominated	
FAMAS Awards	2018	Best Actress	Bliss	Nominated	
FAMAS Awards	2021	Best Actress	Tagpuan	Nominated	
Film Ambassadors’ Night	2018	Special Award for International Recognition	Bliss	Won	
Gawad Pasado Awards	2015	Best Supporting Actress (Note: (shared with Gretchen Barretto & Lotlot de Leon))	Starting Over Again	Won	
Gawad Pasado Awards	2016	Best Ensemble (Note: (shared with Claudine Barretto, Kris Aquino, Kim Chiu & Chiena Crab)	Etiquette for Mistresses	Won	
Gawad Pasado Awards	2021	Best Actress	Tagpuan	Won	
Gawad Tanglaw Awards	2019	Best Actress — Drama series	Ngayon at Kailanman	Won	
Gawad Tanglaw Awards	2020	Jury Award for Best Performance	Culion & Pandanggo sa Hukay	Won	
Gawad Tanglaw Awards	2022	Best Actress — Drama series (Note: (tied with Jodi Sta. Maria))	Ang sa Iyo ay Akin	Won	
Gawad Urian Awards	2005	Best Supporting Actress	Sigaw	Won	
Gawad Urian Awards	2010	Best Actress	Dukot	Nominated	
Gawad Urian Awards	2015	Best Supporting Actress	Barber's Tales	Nominated	
Golden Screen Awards	2005	Breakthrough Performance by an Actress	Milan	Won	
Golden Screen Awards	2008	Best Supporting Actress (Musical, Drama or Comedy)	Blackout	Nominated	
Golden Screen Awards	2010	Best Performance by an Actress in a Lead Role (Drama)	Dukot	Won	
Golden Screen Awards	2013	Best Performance by an Actress in a Lead Role (Drama)	Mga Mumunting Lihim	Nominated	
Golden Screen Awards	2013	Dekada Award	Herself	Won	
Golden Screen TV Awards	2013	Outstanding Performance by an Actress in a Single Drama/Telemovie Program	Maalaala Mo Kaya — "Ilog"	Nominated	
Golden Screen TV Awards	2014	Outstanding Performance by an Actress in a Single Drama/Telemovie Program	Maalaala Mo Kaya — "Cross-Stitch"	Won	
Luna Awards	2009	Best Supporting Actress	One True Love	Won	
Metro Manila Film Festival	2006	Best Actress	Shake, Rattle & Roll 8	Nominated	
Metro Manila Film Festival	2009	Best Actress	Ang Panday	Nominated	
Metro Manila Film Festival	2011	Best New Wave Actress	HIV: Si Heidi, si Ivy at si V	Won	
Metro Manila Film Festival	2011	Face of the Night	Herself	Won	
Metro Manila Film Festival	2015	Best Supporting Actress	Haunted Mansion	Nominated	
Metro Manila Film Festival	2019	Special Jury Prize for cast ensemble	Culion	Won	
Metro Manila Film Festival	2020	Best Actress	Tagpuan	Nominated	
Myx Music Awards	2020	Myx Celebrity VJ of the Year (Note: (with Sunshine Dizon, Karylle & Diana Zubiri))	Herself	Nominated	
National Commission for Culture and the Arts Ani ng Dangal Awards	2018	Cinema Award for International Recognition	Bliss	Won	
Nickelodeon Kids Choice Awards Philippines	2008	Favorite Actress	Herself	Nominated	
Osaka Asian Film Festival	2017	Yakushi Pearl for Best Performance	Bliss	Won	
PMPC Star Awards for Movies	2008	Movie Supporting Actress of the Year	Ouija	Nominated	
PMPC Star Awards for Movies	2010	Movie Actress of the Year	Dukot	Nominated	
PMPC Star Awards for Movies	2015	Movie Supporting Actress of the Year	Starting Over Again	Nominated	
PMPC Star Awards for Movies	2017	Movie Actress of the Year	Etiquette for Mistresses	Nominated	
PMPC Star Awards for Movies	2018	Movie Actress of the Year	Bliss	Won	
PMPC Star Awards for Movies	2019	Movie Actress of the Year	Distance	Nominated	
PMPC Star Awards for Movies	2023	Movie Actress of the Year	Tagpuan	Nominated	
PMPC Star Awards for Television	2012	Best Single Performance by an Actress	Maalaala Mo Kaya — "Cross-Stitch"	Nominated	
PMPC Star Awards for Television	2013	Best Single Performance by an Actress	Maalaala Mo Kaya — "Ilog"	Nominated	
PMPC Star Awards for Television	2014	Best Reality Show Hosts (Note: (with Robi Domingo and Matteo Guidicelli))	The Biggest Loser Pinoy Edition: Doubles	Nominated	
PMPC Star Awards for Television	2017	Best Drama Supporting Actress	A Love to Last	Nominated	
PMPC Star Awards for Television	2019	Best Drama Supporting Actress	Ngayon at Kailanman	Nominated	
PMPC Star Awards for Television	2023	Best Drama Actress	Ang sa Iyo ay Akin	Nominated	

== Other accolades ==
=== Minor associations ===
Awards and nominations received by Iza Calzado
Award	Year	Category	Nominated work	Result	Ref.
Downy Never Fade Awards	2020	Never Fade Award for Women Empowerment	Herself	Won	
GEMS Hiyas ng Sining	2019	Best Actress	Distance	Nominated	
GEMS Hiyas ng Sining	2019	Best Performance in a Supporting Role	Ngayon at Kailanman	Won	
GEMS Hiyas ng Sining	2021	Best Performance by an Actress	Ang sa Iyo ay Akin	Won	
Jeepney TV Awards	2022	Fave Love Affair Triangle	Ang sa Iyo ay Akin	Nominated	
Laguna Excellence Awards	2021	Outstanding TV Actress of the Year (tied with Jodi Sta. Maria)	Ang sa Iyo Ay Akin	Won	
Metrowear Style Awards	2020	Muses Award	Herself	Won	
Outstanding Men and Women Awards	2019	Honoree	Herself	Won	
Push Awards	2020	Push Inspiration Award (shared with Angel Locsin & Kim Chiu)	Herself	Won	
Star Magic Ball Awards	2014	Moet and Chandon Fabulous Pair of the Night (with Piolo Pascual)	Herself	Won	
Tag Awards Chicago	2022	Best Supporting Actress	Darna	Nominated	
VP Choice Awards	2021	Movie Actress of the Year	Tagpuan	Nominated	
VP Choice Awards	2021	TV Actress of the Year	Ang sa Iyo ay Akin	Nominated	
VP Choice Awards	2021	TV Female Icon of the Decade	Herself	Nominated	
Urduja Film Festival Heritage Films Awards	2021	Best Actress	Culion	Won	
Us Girls August Awards	2010	Best Dressed Celebrity	Herself	Won	
USTv Students' Choice Awards	2006	Best Actress	Encantadia	Won	

=== Listicles ===
Name of publisher, name of listicle, year(s) listed, and placement result
Publisher	Listicle	Year(s)	Ref(s).
Metro Magazine	Top 10 Most Stylish Women	2020	
Yes! Magazine	100 Most Beautiful Stars	2008	
Yes! Magazine	100 Most Beautiful Stars	2009	
Yes! Magazine	100 Most Beautiful Stars	2010	
Yes! Magazine	100 Most Beautiful Stars	2011	
Yes! Magazine	100 Most Beautiful Stars	2012	
Yes! Magazine	100 Most Beautiful Stars	2013	
Yes! Magazine	100 Most Beautiful Stars	2014	
Yes! Magazine	100 Most Beautiful Stars	2017	
Yes! Magazine	100 Most Beautiful Stars	2018	
