= TJ Trinidad =

Filipino actor

- Born: Raul Fenstad Trinidad Jr. January 22, 1976 (age 50); Calatagan, Batangas, Philippines
- Occupations: Actor; singer; model
- Years active: 2003–2019
- Spouse: Margarita Valdes (m. 2011)
- Children: 2
- Relatives: P.J. Trinidad (cousin); J.R. Trinidad (cousin)

Raul "TJ" Fenstad Trinidad Jr. (born January 22, 1976) is a former Filipino actor and businessman.

== Early life ==
Trinidad graduated high school from Colegio de San Agustin and studied marketing at De La Salle University. As a student, Trinidad joined two rock bands as a vocalist and also participated in school plays. Trinidad was also a member of a parish youth theater group in Alabang, mostly doing fundraising plays for the holiday seasons.

As a child, Trinidad appeared in more than a dozen TV commercials for brands such as San Miguel Beer and Swatch.

After graduation, Trinidad worked nine-to-five jobs in several marketing firms until a friend encouraged him to join an audition for a soap drama at ABS-CBN.

== Career ==
Trinidad's acting career began when he was accepted for a supporting role in the 2003 primetime TV series Basta't Kasama Kita, which starred Judy Ann Santos. In 2004, Trinidad also played supporting roles in the film Aishite Imasu 1941: Mahal Kita and in the sci-fi fantasy series Krystala, both of which also starred Santos. In later interviews, Trinidad credited Santos for helping him further hone his acting skills.

In 2006, Trinidad landed a breakout role when he was cast in the lead role of Cardin" Medel opposite Kristine Hermosa in the 2006 drama series Gulong ng Palad. In 2008, Trinidad moved to GMA Network at the suggestion of Eddie Gutierrez who was a good friend of Trinidad's father. Gutierrez's wife Annabelle Rama also became Trinidad's manager. At GMA, he was cast as the antagonist Ramon Pelaez in the 2009 adaptation of Zorro, as Tristan Aragon in the Philippine adaptation of Stairway to Heaven, as Gregor Javier or "Metal Man" in Captain Barbell: Ang Pagbabalik, as Gabriel Tanchingco The Rich Man's Daughter, and as the sidekick Greco in Mulawin vs Ravena.

Trinidad made his directorial debut in 2010 when his indie film Mga Kinahinatnan ng Aking Kabalbalan was featured in the 2010 Cinemalaya Philippine Independent Film Festival.

Trinidad starred as Robert Naval in Jerrold Tarog's 2013 Cinemalaya film Sana Dati, for which he won his first acting award as Best Supporting Actor. Trinidad and Tarog would continue to collaborate in the 2017 psychological thriller film Bliss and in the 2019 historical epic Goyo: The Boy General where he portrayed the older version of President Manuel L. Quezon in the epilogue. He has also starred in other indie productions such as the 2015 film Sleepless and the 2016 hybrid animated film Saving Sally. Trinidad played the role of Bruce Niles, a closeted gay man, in the Philippine staging of the off-Broadway play The Normal Heart in its 2015 run. In 2019, Trinidad made his last television appearance in The Gift as a guest star. Since then, he was worked as an executive in the aviation sector.

== Personal life ==
Trinidad married businesswoman Margarita Valdes in a private ceremony in Tagaytay in 2011. They have two children.

In 2013, Trinidad ran for the position of 1st district councilor during the 2013 Pasay local elections but was not elected.

=== Business ventures ===
Trinidad has been involved in the aviation industry since 2018, when he became the director of business development for aviation at International Container Terminal Services. In 2019, he became the vice president of Aviation Concepts Technical Services, an aerospace company based in Subic Bay.

== Filmography ==
=== Film ===
Year	Title	Role	Notes	Source
2003	Keka	Arvin Cortez		
2004	Aishite Imasu 1941: Mahal Kita	Antonio		
2004	I Will Survive	Rudy		
2005	Uno			
2005	Miss Pinoy			
2006	Shake, Rattle and Roll 8	Teacher Mel	Segment: "Yaya"	
2007	The Promise	Anton		
2007	Tiyanaks	Professor Earl/Erl		
2007	A Love Story	Rick Montes		
2007	Desperadas	Richard		
2007	Resiklo	Jerson		
2008	SEB: Cyber Game of Love	Andrew		
2008	100	Rod		
2008	For the First Time	Greg Sandoval		
2008	Mag-ingat ka sa Kulam	Dave		
2008	Desperadas 2	Richard		
2009	The Rapture of Fe	Arturo		
2009	Patient X	Alfred Molina		
2011	Deadline: The Reign of Impunity	Ross Rivera		
2011	The Road	Luis		
2012	Si Agimat, si Enteng Kabisote at si Ako	Byron		
2013	Sana Dati	Robert Naval		
2015	Felix Manalo	Pastor Emiliano Quijano		
2015	Buy Now, Die Later	Santi		
2015	Sleepless	Vince		
2016	Always Be My Maybe	Carlo		
2016	Working Beks	Tommy		
2016	Saving Sally	Nick		
2017	Bliss	Carlo		
2017	Smaller and Smaller Circles	Deputy Jake Valdez		
2018	Sin Island	Stephen		
2018	The Eternity Between Seconds			
2018	Goyo: Ang Batang Heneral	Manuel L. Quezon		
2019	My Letters to Happy	Albert		

=== Television ===
Year	Title	Role	Notes	Source
2003–2004	Basta't Kasama Kita	John Paul		
2003–2009	ASAP	Himself / co-host / Performer		
2004–2005	Krystala	Gino Salvador		
2006–2007	Komiks Presents: Da Adventures of Pedro Penduko	Pantas		
2006	Gulong ng Palad	Carding Medel		
2006	Your Song	Marco	Episode: "Kung Paano"	
2007	Sineserye Presents: Hiram na Mukha	Dr. Hugo Roldan		
2007	Rounin	Xander		
2007	Walang Kapalit	Dr. Victor Hizon		
2007–2008	Prinsesa ng Banyera	Eric Fragante		
2008	Maalaala Mo Kaya	Jordan	Episode: "Cellphone"	
2008	Your Song	Aris	Episode: "I'll Take Care of You"	
2009	Zorro	Captain Ramon Pelaez		
2009	SRO Cinemaserye: Rowena Joy	Gino		
2009	Stairway to Heaven	Tristan Aragon / Charlie Matias	Originally by Korean actor Shin Hyun-joon	
2009–2010	Sana Ngayong Pasko	Stephen Dionisio		
2010	Dear Friend	Rommel	Episode: "Almost a Love Story"	
2010	Diva	Martin Valencia		
2010	Claudine	Lemuel	Episode: "Kahapon, Ngayon at Bukas"	
2010–2011	Beauty Queen	Marc Sandoval		
2011	Captain Barbell: Ang Pagbabalik	Gregor Javier / Metal Man	Supporting Cast / Antagonist	
2011	Spooky Nights	Stephen Lee	Episode: "Nuno sa Feng Shui"	
2011	Spooky Nights	Hector	Episode: "Sanggol"	
2011–2012	Ruben Marcelino's Kokak	Carl Lorenzo		
2012	Spooky Valentine	Nestor	Episode: "Maestra"	
2012	Makapiling Kang Muli	Javier Lagdameo		
2012–2013	Aso ni San Roque	Police C / Insp. Mateo Salvador		
2013	Magpakailanman	Prolen	Episode: "The Prolen Banacua Story"	
2013	One Day, Isang Araw	Orly	Episode: "Gamer Girl"	
2013	Genesis	Paolo De Guzman†	Main Cast / Antagonist	
2014	The Borrowed Wife	Earl Villaraza†	Main Cast / Antagonist	
2014	Magpakailanman	Rommel	Episode: "A Mother's Sacrifice"	
2014–2015	Strawberry Lane	Jonathan "Jun" Morales		
2015	The Rich Man's Daughter	Gabriel Tanchingco		
2015	Magpakailanman	Lester	Episode: "Sex Slave: Anak, Pinabayaan ng Ina?"	
2015	Magpakailanman	Samuel	Episode: "Ang Batang Isinilang Sa Bilangguan"	
2015	Magpakailanman	Haruko	Episode: "Binihag na Kasambahay" (Supporting Cast / Antagonist)	
2016	Wish I May	Lance Delgado		
2016	Magpakailanman	Pau	Episode: "Nang Mawala ang Langit"	
2016	Karelasyon	Jack	Episode: "Duwende"	
2016	FPJ's Ang Probinsyano	Attorney Patrick		
2016	Maalaala Mo Kaya	Pablo	Episode: "Rehas"	
2017	A Love to Last	Ben Avelino		
2017	Magpakailanman	Egay	Episode: "Ang Munting Bayani"	
2017	Ikaw Lang ang Iibigin	Young Roman Dela Vega	Special Participation	
2017	Mulawin vs. Ravena	Greco		
2018	Ngayon at Kailanman	Rodrigo Cortes†		
2019	The Gift	Gener	Special Participation	

=== Theater ===
Year	Title	Role	Notes	Source
2015	The Normal Heart	Bruce Niles	Carlos P. Romulo Auditorium, RCBC Plaza	

== Awards and nominations ==
Year	Work	Award	Category	Result	Source
2013	Sana Dati	Cinemalaya Philippine Independent Film Festival	Best Supporting Actor	Won	
2015	Buy Now, Die Later	Metro Manila Film Festival	Best Supporting Actor	Nominated	
