= Iza Calzado =

Filipino actress (born 1982)

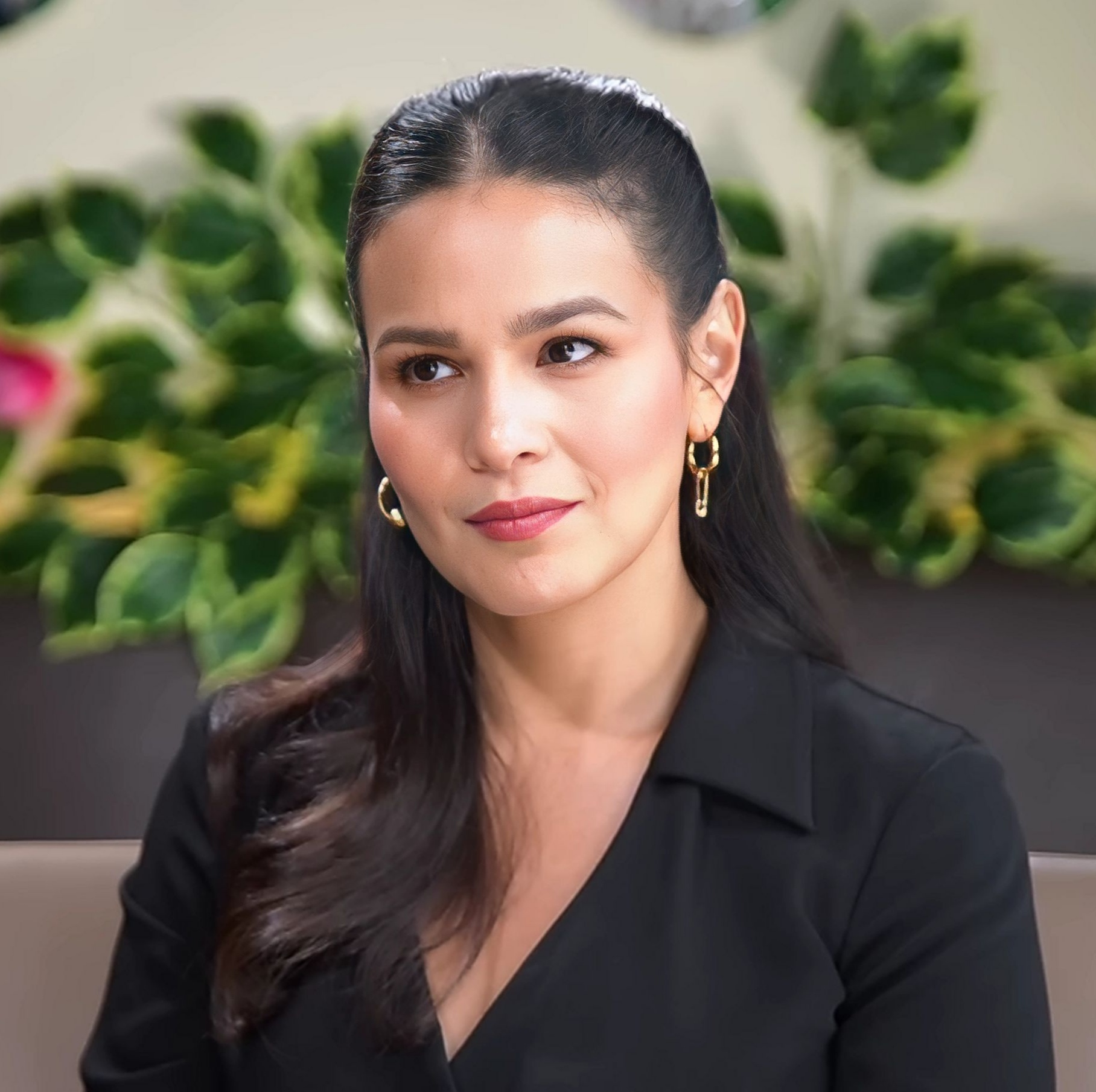
- Calzado in 2023
- Born: Maria Izadora Ussher Calzado; August 12, 1982 (age 44); Quezon City, Metro Manila, Philippines
- Occupations: Actress; television presenter; film producer; commercial model; businesswoman; philanthropist
- Years active: 1989–1993; 2002–present
- Agents: GMA Network (2002–2012); ABS-CBN (2012–2022); TV5 (2021–present); Freelancer (2022–present)
- Works: Full list
- Height: 1.70 m (5 ft 7 in)
- Spouse: Ben Wintle (m. 2018)
- Children: 1
- Parent(s): Lito Calzado (father); Maria Antonia Ussher (mother)
- Relatives: Dash Calzado (brother); Bianca King (sister-in-law)
- Awards: Full list

Maria Izadora Ussher Calzado (born August 12, 1982) is a Filipino actress. Known for her roles in blockbusters and independent films, particularly drama, psychological thriller and horror, she has received numerous accolades, including an Osaka Asian Film Festival Award, an Asian Television Award, a Gawad Urian, a Luna Award and three Metro Manila Film Festival Awards, in addition to nominations for five FAMAS Awards. Her films have earned ₱1.96 billion, making her one of the highest-grossing Filipino box office stars this century.

Calzado, daughter of choreographer and actor Lito Calzado, initially played bit roles in two films as a child actress, including Lino Brocka's Kung Tapos Na Ang Kailanman (1990). She took a long break from the show business and returned in the early 2000s through stints in commercials. She played a supporting role in the soap opera Kung Mawawala Ka (2002) and landed her first leading role in the romantic drama Te Amo, Maging Sino Ka Man (2004). She gained early recognitions for her roles in Milan, Sabel and Sigaw, winning the Gawad Urian for Best Supporting Actress for the latter. Calzado made her breakthrough by playing one of the leads in the fantasy action Encantadia (2005).

She went on to star in several commercially successful films, including Moments of Love (2006), Ouija (2007), Starting Over Again (2014) and Etiquette for Mistresses (2015). Her starring roles in Impostora (2007), All About Eve (2009), Beauty Queen (2010), Hawak Kamay (2014), A Love to Last (2017) and Ang sa Iyo Ay Akin (2020) established her as a leading actress in soap operas. She also received widespread critical acclaim for her performances in Dukot (2009), Mga Mumunting Lihim (2012), Haunted Mansion (2015), Bliss (2017) and Culion (2019). Calzado served as one of the jury at the 4th Hanoi International Film Festival in Vietnam and a member of the committee at the Cinemanila International Film Festival in 2010.

== Early life ==
Born Maria Izadora Ussher Calzado, she was named after the American dancer Isadora Duncan. Her father was Lito Calzado, a choreographer and TV director. Her mother was Maria Antonia Ussher. She has an elder brother, Dash Calzado, who is a member of Legit Misfitz, a 1990s Pinoy rap group. Calzado's mother died from suicide in 2001 after having suffered from bipolar disorder.

Calzado finished elementary at School of the Holy Spirit and high school at Miriam College High School. She went on to take her undergraduate degree in fine arts at the University of Santo Tomas.

== Career ==
=== 1999–2005: Early roles and breakthrough ===
After several dubbing stints, Calzado made a guest appearance in the drama series Click. In 2002, she played a supporting role in her first soap opera Kung Mawawala Ka. Her performance landed Calzado her first lead role in the romantic drama Te Amo, Maging Sino Ka Man opposite Argentine actor Segundo Cernadas. She also appeared in four films in 2004. She made her first film appearance in Olivia Lamasan's romantic drama Milan. She next played supporting roles in the psychological drama Sabel and the romantic comedy Annie B. Her final role of the year was in the supernatural horror film Sigaw. Her performance was lauded by the critics, earning Calzado her first Gawad Urian Award for Beat Supporting Actress, in addition to a nomination at the Metro Manila Film Festival in the same category. The year 2005 marked a high point in Calzado's career. She took hosting stints through the morning show 3R (Respect, Relax, Respond) with Chynna Ortaleza and the public affairs show At Your Service: Star Power where she served as the main host. The same year, she starred in her breakthrough role Amihan in the fantasy drama Encantadia. The series was a success, garnering an all-time high rating of 51.7%, becoming GMA Network's third highest-rating TV show of all time. For her performance, Calzado was named Best Actress at the USTv Student's Choice Awards. Following its success, Calzado reprised her role as Amihan in Etheria: Ang Ikalimang Kaharian ng Encantadia for the second installment of the Encantadia franchise. She also appeared in three films that year. She played supporting roles in the comedies Pinoy/Blonde and Ispiritista: Itay, May Moomoo. For her final film of the year, Calzado reprised her role as Amihan in the fantasy Mulawin: The Movie, an entry for the 31st Metro Manila Film Festival.

=== 2006–2008: Moments of Love, Impostora, Desperadas and One True Love ===
In 2006, Calzado appeared in three film productions. She played Divina Buenacer in Mark A. Reyes' romantic drama Moments of Love opposite Dingdong Dantes. A surprise hit at the box office, it was followed up by another romantic drama Eternity with Dantes which also stars Jennylyn Mercado and Mark Herras. She next appeared as a vampire-like creature disguised as a nanny in the eighth installment of the horror Shake, Rattle and Roll 8. The film earned ₱57 million at the box-office throughout its run at the Metro Manila Film Festival, becoming the third highest-grossing film of the festival. That year, Calzado also starred in two television projects. For the last time, Calzado reprised her role as Amihan in Encantadia: Pag-Ibig Hanggang Wakas, the third installment of the franchise. The series was still a success, becoming the third most watched program with an average rating of 32.2%, based on Mega Manila TV household between January and February 2006. She next played a supporting role in the fantasy series Atlantika.

In 2007, Calzado made appearances in the anthology Magpakailanman. She starred alongside Sunshine Dizon in Maryo J. de los Reyes' drama Impostora. The series was well received by the audience, garnering 37.6% rating in its finale based on AGB Neilsen's overnight ratings among Mega Manila households, beating Marian Rivera's Marimar. The same year, Calzado also had five film releases. She played a maternal role in the psychological thriller Blackout. She next played the lead in the indie film Mona: Singapore Escort. Calzado also starred in the supernatural horror Ouija with Judy Ann Santos, Jolina Magdangal and Rhian Ramos. The film was a success at the box office, grossing ₱60 million within its first week. Calzado had two more major releases by the end of the year. She starred in the romantic drama Batanes: Sa Dulo ng Walang Hanggan with Taiwanese actor Ken Chu. Her final film appearance was in the comedy Desperadas. The film performed moderately at the box-office with ₱35.5 million earnings, becoming the fourth highest-grossing entry at the Metro Manila Film Festival.

Calzado appeared in four television projects in 2008. She played a supporting role as Robin Padilla's leading lady in the action fantasy Joaquin Bordado. For her portrayal, Calzado became a semi-finalist in consideration for a nomination at the International Emmy Awards. She next top billed the suspense thriller series E.S.P. where she played as an investigative journalist. She also starred in a number of episodes in the anthology Obra and made a guest appearance in the series LaLola. That year, Calzado also appeared in four films. She starred alongside Marian Rivera and Dingdong Dantes in the romance mystery One True Love. She next played a supporting role in the horror comedy Scaregivers. She reprised her role as Stephanie in the sequel Desperadas 2. The film performed moderately at the box-office throughout its run at the Metro Manila Film Festival, earning over ₱40 million. She also reprised her role as the victimized wife in the supernatural horror The Echo, an American remake of Yam Laranas' Sigaw.

=== 2009–2011: All About Eve, Dukot and hosting stints ===
The following year, Calzado appeared in more than ten projects in television and film. After appearing in the anthologies SRO Cinemaserye and Dear Friend, she reunited with Sunshine Dizon in the drama All About Eve. According to AGB Neilsen, the series garnered 31.8% ratings, becoming the No. 1 most watched show on television occasionally throughout its run. She next topbilled the afternoon drama Kaya Kong Abutin ang Langit with Wendell Ramos. She then appeared as one of the councils in the reality talent competition Starstruck V. Calzado made a cameo appearance in the horror drama Sundo and next played a supporting role in the drama comedy Fuschia. Calzado also starred in the political thriller Bente with Richard Gomez and Snooky Serna. She next played supporting roles in the comedy Yaya and Angelina: The Spoiled Brat Movie and fantasy Ang Panday. Her final film project of that year was in the political drama Dukot with Allen Dizon. Calzado's performance was acclaimed by the critics, earning her Best Actress nominations at the FAMAS, Gawad Urian and Star Awards for Movies, in addition to winning Best Performance by an Actress in a Leading Role at the Golden Screen Awards.

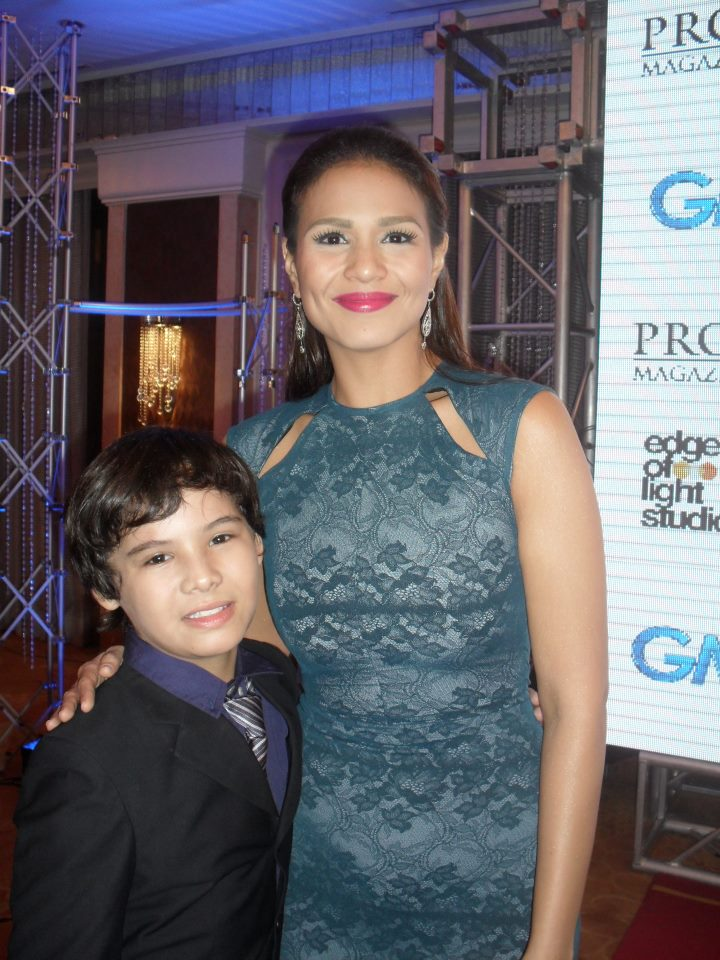
Calzado in November 2011

In 2010, Calzado ventured into more hosting gigs. She was the main host in the cooking show Healthy Cravings, co-hosted the musical variety show Party Pilipinas and the lifestyle show The Sweet Life. After playing Teresa in the anthology Claudine, she played Maria Makiling in the drama fantasy Panday Kids and starred in Joel Lamangan's drama Beauty Queen. The series was a success, reigning over Mega Manila in TV ratings. That year, Calzado also starred in three films. She was cast as one of the leads in Jose Javier Reyes' Working Girls. She next played the Black Lady in Topel Lee's supernatural horror White House alongside Gabby Concepcion, Lovi Poe and Maricar Reyes. Calzado' s final film appearance in 2010 was a supporting in the drama HIV: Si Heidi, Si Ivy at Si V which stars Jake Cuenca. The Department of Health (DOH) invested in the film to help "boost the agency’s anti-HIV/AIDS campaign." In 2011, Calzado replaced Regine Velasquez as the lead in the latter part of the romantic comedy I Heart You, Pare!, which also stars Dingdong Dantes. The series was a success, receiving an average of 22.9% ratings in Mega Manila for its finale episode. She next starred opposite Cesar Montano in her first situational comedy Andres de Saya. Calzado's last projects with GMA Network were hosting stints in Eat Bulaga! and Showbiz Exclusives.

=== 2012–2016: Transfer to ABS-CBN, Starting Over Again, and stage debut ===
After nearly ten years with GMA Network, Calzado signed a three-year exclusive contract with ABS-CBN. Her first acting stint under her new home studio was in an episode of Maalaala Mo Kaya where she starred alongside Zanjoe Marudo. She became an occasional performer in the musical variety show ASAP and starred in Wenn V. Deramas' romantic drama the Kahit Puso'y Masugatan with Gabby Concepcion, Jake Cuenca and Andi Eigenmann. In 2013, Calzado made guest appearances in the sitcom Toda Max and melodrama Muling Buksan ang Puso. That year, she played a supporting role in Jun Lana's historical drama Barber's Tales. The following year, she hosted the second season of The Biggest Loser Pinoy Edition: Doubles. The reality show was a success with 10% rating on its pilot episode, higher than its timeslot rival A 100 Year Legacy with only 8.2%. She next starred in the family drama Hawak Kamay with Piolo Pascual. According to Kantar Media, the series registered 33.5% nationwide rating for its finale episode, becoming the most watched program in the Philippines.

In 2014, Calzado appeared in two productions under Star Cinema and one in Regal Entertainment. Her first release was Olivia Lamasan's Starting Over Again, a romantic drama co-starring Piolo Pascual and Toni Gonzaga. The film became Calzado's biggest commercial success to date, earning ₱579 million at the box office. For the film, she was named Film Actress of the Year at the 46th Box Office Entertainment Awards. She next appeared in the romantic comedy Somebody to Love with an ensemble cast. She then starred alongside Jodi Sta. Maria and Zanjoe Marudo in supernatural horror Maria Leonora Teresa. The film performed moderately commercially, earning ₱72.7 million at the box office. Calzado appeared in two film projects in 2015. She starred in Chito S. Roño's romantic drama Etiquette for Mistresses, co-starring Kris Aquino, Claudine Barretto, Kim Chiu and Cheena Crab. Writing for Philippine Entertainment Portal, Maridol Ranoa-Bismark described Calzado's performance "Outstanding" saying: "Iza, even with the experienced actress Claudine, leaves no one in doubt that she is an important actress." Rito Asilo of Entertainment Inquirer also praised her portrayal saying: "she proves that a fine performance isn’t compromised by the quantity of scenes she appears in." For the film, Calzado earned a nomination for Movie Actress of the Year at the 32nd PMPC Star Awards for Movies. That year, she also made a cameo appearance as Colonel Olivia Buenaventura in the action drama Ang Probinsyano.

Calzado was handpicked by National Artist Benedicto Cabrera to be the subject in her stage debut Sabel, which was the first original Filipino theater production to be staged at the Solaire Theater. Calzado took a break from television and appeared in four productions in 2016. She played a supporting role in Mark Dacascos' international action film Showdown in Manila. The Cine Filipino Film Festival saw the release of Buhay Habangbuhay. Calzado next appeared in the romantic comedy My Candidate, co-starring Shaina Magdayao and Derek Ramsay. She also made a cameo appearance in the comedy drama Die Beautiful. Later in 2016, Calzado served as one of the jury members at the 4th Hanoi International Film Festival in Vietnam.

=== 2017–present: Established actress ===
Calzado made her television comeback in 2017 through the family drama A Love to Last, co-starring Bea Alonzo and Ian Veneracion. The series registered high viewership, garnering 27.8% nationwide ratings. That year, Calzado also made a cameo in Cathy Garcia-Sampana's family drama Seven Sundays and starred in two films released on the first quarter of the year. She played a maternal character in Dan Villegas' indie supernatural horror Ilawod. It was followed up by Jerrold Tarog's psychological thriller Bliss. The film competed at the Osaka Asian Film Festival where Calzado won the Yakushi Pearl for Best Performance, in addition to winning Movie Actress of the Year at the PMPC Star Awards for Movies and Film Actress of the Year at the Box Office Entertainment Awards. In 2018, Calzado starred in the independent film Distance. The film competed at the Tokyo International Film Festival. For her portrayal, she received a nomination for Best Actress at the Cinemalaya Philippine Independent Film Festival and PMPC Star Awards for Movies. Calzado also appeared in the romantic drama Ngayon at Kailanman. For ger performance, Calzado received a nomination for Best Drama Supporting Actress at the PMPC Star Awards for Television.

Calzado starred in three productions in 2019. She reunited with Sunshine Dizon, Karylle and Diana Zubiri in Mark A. Reyes' Mystified, a fantasy film which premiered on the streaming service iflix. The film received four nominations at the Asian Television Awards, winning in the category Best Single Drama or Telemovie, in addition to a nomination for an Asian Academy Creative Awards. She next starred in the crime drama Pandanggo sa Hukay, an entry to the Cinemalaya Philippine Independent Film Festival. It was followed by Alvin Yapan's historical drama Culion, co-starring Jasmine Curtis-Smith and Meryll Soriano. For the two films, Calzado received a Jury Award for Best Performance at the Gawad Tanglaw Award.

In 2020, Calzado starred as the main antagonist in FM Reyes' Ang sa Iyo ay Akin, co-starring Jodi Sta. Maria, Sam Milby and Maricel Soriano. The revenge drama was the first ABS-CBN series to be released following the denial of the broadcast franchise of the network by a congressional panel. Upon its release on the streaming service Netflix, the series became the No. 1 most watched show on Netflix Philippines. For her performance, Calzado won Outstanding TV Actress of the Year at the Laguna Excellence Awards, Best Performance by an Actress at the 5th GEMS Hiyas ng Sining, and Best Actress at the Gawad Tanglaw Awards, in addition to Best Drama Actress nomination at the PMPC Star Awards for Television. The same year, Calzado next appeared in two web series. She starred opposite Jameson Blake in the romance Loving Emily. which premiered on iWantTFC. In 2021, she starred in an episode of Maalaala Mo Kaya with Sharmaine Buencamino. The following year, Calzado made a special participation in the action drama Mars Ravelo's Darna where she played the first Darna. In 2023, she made her film comeback in the sixteenth installment of the horror anthology Shake, Rattle & Roll Extreme. It premiered on November 30, 2023, after it failed to make the cut of the Metro Manila Film Festival. Meanwhile, during the ABS‑CBN Christmas Special 2025, Iza Calzado confirmed and said that she no longer has an exclusive contract with the Kapamilya network and work as a freelance actress. Her contract with ABS‑CBN expired in 2022, during the network shutdown. She affirmed that she is still willing to accept schedules with ABS-CBN even as a freelancer due to not having a media company contract.”

== Philanthropy and advocacy ==
Calzado is an advocate of mental health, body positivity, self-acceptance and women empowerment. She is one of the co-founders of She Talks Asia, a non-profit organization which centers in "raising awareness of the importance of physical, emotional and mental well-being." She has also lent her support to several charities and causes. Calzado is an Avon breast cancer ambassador for The Avon Walk, a campaign that helps raise financial support to breast cancer sufferers and survivors. In 2007, she celebrated her 25th birthday with the cancer stricken children at the Philippine Children's Medical Center (PCMC). In 2009, she also celebrated her 27th birthday with the beneficiaries of Gawad Kalinga Community Development Foundation, Inc.

Calzado is also one of the board of directors of the SEC-registered nonprofit and nonstock organization League of Filipino Actors which is "composed of the showbiz industry’s co-creators and collaborators in order to give them a collective voice on different issues." In 2016, Calzado was appointed as one of the national female ambassadors of the World Wide Fund for Nature which "help spread WWF’s solutions on climate change, conservation, resource protection and environmental education."

== Reception and public image ==
Truly, Iza is an actress of the highest caliber, certainly one of the best, if not the best actress of her generation... she towers above all and everyone else.

— Ricky L. Calderon from Philippine Star on Iza Calzado (2017).

Dubbed as the most important actress of her generation, Calzado is described as an "acting marvel" by the critics. She is noted for her versatility in playing diverse roles and is celebrated as one of the Philippines' most successful actresses in the industry, garnering subsequent success and recognition in film and television. In 2010, Calzado was chosen by the committee of the Cinemanila International Film Festival to be a member of the jury for having an "outstanding film credentials", further adding: "Iza embodies the dynamism and excellence of filmmaking today." The Young Filmmakers of the Philippines (YFMP) ranked Calzado fifth in their list of 2010's Best Actors and Actresses in Philippine Independent Cinema and Theater. She received widespread acclaim for her performance in Bliss (2017). Francis Joseph Cruz from Rappler praised her portrayal saying: "She is the heart of the film, the passive sufferer who can't do anything but absorb the pain and pleasure." She notably became a semi-finalist in the "Best Actress" category of the International Emmy Awards for her performance in Joaquin Bordado (2008).

Filipino director Richard Somes praised Calzado's acting prowess, saying: "She is one of the best dramatic actresses we have. She’s at the top of her game. I think she needs to be recognized for the work she does." Filipino director Adolf Alix Jr. praised Calzado's performance in the film Batanes: Sa Dulo ng Walang Hanggan, saying: "I think her willingness to experiment and take unconventional roles make her stand out." Writing for BusinessMirror, Charles Legaspi called Calzado the "most gifted" among her contemporaries, saying: "In her generation of gorgeous actresses, Iza is arguably the most gifted. A contemporary Hilda Koronel in both extraordinary beauty and impressive emotional range." In 2013, Risa Hontiveros stated in an interview that she wants Calzado to play her in a biopic, saying: "I love the way she acts. It's so real, unaffected. Its simple and essential." Alex Castro, whom she worked with in the film Somebody to Love (2014) praised her high-caliber acting style and stated that it motivated him to improve his craft in acting.

=== Public image ===
She is also referred to as a "Gay Icon", notable for her career-defining role as Sang'gre Amihan in Encantadia (2005–06). Kurt Alec Mira from Medium listed her among the "7 Pinoy gay icons we grew up loving" saying: "Every gay kid who watched the series probably acted as a sang'gre in their rooms behind their parents' backs... Many pageant contestants started portraying Amihan in their costumes." Social media personality AC Soriano cosplayed the iconic costume for Pride March. She also received acclaim as the first Darna in Mars Ravelo's Darna (2022). Ryan Oquiza from Rappler called her as the one who stole the show saying that she "embodies the bravado of Anjanette Abayari and the gravitas of Angel Locsin." Mike Diez from The Philippine Star praised her performance saying: "She brings weight to the character and exudes an aura of authority." The Swiss luxury watches and jewelry brand, Charriol, introduced the "Izadore bangle", named after her as part of the International Women's Month celebration.

== Personal life ==
Calzado married businessman Ben Wintle in December 2018.

During the first month of COVID-19 pandemic in the Philippines, Calzado was hospitalized on March 25, 2020, because of pneumonia. On March 28, she was tested positive for the coronavirus disease (COVID-19). On March 30, Calzado's manager Noel Ferrer announced that she already tested negative for COVID-19 and that she would be discharged from the hospital.

On August 12, 2022, her 40th birthday, Calzado announced that she and Wintle were expecting their first child, a girl. Calzado gave birth to Deia Amihan on January 26, 2023.

== Acting credits and awards ==
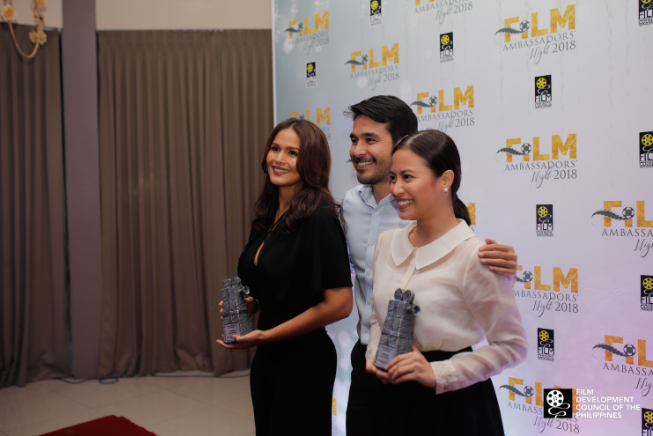
Calzado with Atom Araullo and Anna Luna at the Film Ambassadors' Night in 2018

Calzado has appeared in nearly 100 motion pictures and television programs throughout her career spanning over two decades. According to the online portal Box Office Mojo, her most commercially successful films include Moments of Love (2006), Ouija (2007), One True Love (2008), Starting Over Again (2014) and Etiquette for Mistresses (2015). Starting Over Again previously held the record as the highest-grossing Filipino movie at the global box office until it was surpassed by A Second Chance in December 2015.

Calzado first gained recognition as an actress when she won Best Supporting Actress at the Gawad Urian Awards for Sigaw (2004). Her supporting role in Milan (2004) earned her a Golden Screen Award for Breakthrough Performance by an Actress and a Box Office Entertainment Awards for Most Promising Female Star. In 2006, she received a nomination for Best Actress at the Metro Manila Film Festival for her role in Shake, Rattle and Roll 8. For her performance in Joaquin Bordado (2008), Calzado was shortlisted for a Best Actress nomination at the International Emmy Awards. She received her first Best Actress win at the 7th Golden Screen Awards for her portrayal in Dukot (2009), for which she earned nominations for a FAMAS, Gawad Urian and PMPC Star Awards for Movies. In 2011, Calzado won Best Supporting Actress at the 27th Luna Awards for her role in One True Love (2008).

In 2012, Calzado, along with Judy Ann Santos, Janice de Belen and Agot Isidro, received two major awards at the Cinemalaya Philippine Independent Film Festival. The same year, she won Best Female Emcee at the 25th Aliw Awards. In 2013, she was one of the recipients of the coveted Dekada Award at the 10th Golden Screen Awards. The film Starting Over Again (2014) won her Film Actress of the Year at the Box Office Entertainment Awards and Best Supporting Actress at the Gawad Pasado Awards, in addition to nominations for a FAMAS and Star Awards for Movies. Calzado also received a nomination for Best Supporting Actress at the Metro Manila Film Festival for Haunted Mansion (2015) and a Movie Actress of the Year nomination at the Star Awards for Movies the following year for Etiquette for Mistresses (2016).

Calzado received international recognitions for her acting performances in the following years. For the film Bliss (2017), she won the coveted Yakushi Pearl for Best Performance at the Osaka Asian Film Festival, in addition to winning Movie Actress of the Year at the Star Awards for Movies and Film Actress of the Year at the Box Office Entertainment Awards. For the film Mystified (2019), which was produced by Sanggre Productions Inc, co-founded by Calzado with Sunshine Dizon, Karylle and Diana Zubiri, won Best Single Drama or Telemovie at the Asian Television Awards. In 2020, she was honored with a Jury Award for Best Performance at the Gawad Tanglaw Awards for her roles in the indie films Culion (2019) and Pandanggo sa Hukay (2019).

== See also ==
- List of Filipino actresses
- Cinema of the Philippines
- Television in the Philippines
- Iza Calzado on screen and stage
