= Nico Locco =

Italian-Canadian actor based in the Philippines (born 1993

- Born: Nicholas Timothy Fowler; January 25, 1993 (age 33)
- Occupations: Actor; model; events host

Nicholas Timothy Fowler (born January 25, 1993), better known as Nico Locco, is an Italian-Canadian actor, model and presenter based in the Philippines.

== Life and career ==
=== Early beginnings ===
Nico was born in Canada on January 25, 1993 of Italian and German descent. He moved to the Philippines for modeling and later made minor appearances in television including Tadhana, Wagas and Daddy's Gurl. Prior to his move, he was based in Los Angeles, California with his family.

=== Acting and best actor award ===
In 2019, he appeared in a non-speaking role in the South Korean film Byeonshin. He was cast next in the film Sabado. The film earned six awards in the Gawad Sining Awards including a Best Actor award for Locco. Locco became the first foreigner to win the award in the said organization and the first foreigner to win a Best Actor award in a Philippine-based film competition. In the same year, he also played an American reporter in Rendezvous and an American soldier afflicted with leprosy in Culion.

Locco hosted the Miss Universe Philippines 2021's Final 30 Reveal, with Miss Universe Philippines 2020 4th runner-Up Billie Hakenson, in YouTube in the evening of September 1, 2021. He is set to appear in the anthology series Love at the End of the World.

== Filmography ==
=== Television ===
Year	Title	Role	Notes	Source
2018	Tadhana	New love	Episode: "Online Scandal"; Uncredited	
2018	Tadhana	Luigi	Episode: "Stepdaughter"	
2018	Daddy's Gurl	Coffee plantation worker	Uncredited	
2018	Victor Magtanggol			
2018	Wagas			
2019	Prima Donnas	Party host		
2019	Wait lang... Is This Love?	Vlogger		
2021	Love at the End of the World	Tony		
2025	I Am Your Daughter			
2026	Runaway Love	Omar Duri		

=== Film ===
Year	Title	Roles	Notes	Source
2019	Byeonshin	Balthazar	Credited as "Nicholas Timothy Fowler"	
2019	Sabado	Jensen		
2019	Culion	Fred		
2019	Rendezvous	American reporter	Credited as "Nicholas Timothy Fowler"	
2022	Kuta	Nicco Locco		
2025	Quezon	Sargeant Johnston		

== Awards and nominations ==
Year	Work	Award	Category	Result	Source
2019	Sabado	Gawad Sining Awards	Best Actor	Won	
2019	Culion	Metro Manila Film Festival	Special Jury Prize - Cast Ensemble	Won	
