= Lito Calzado =

Filipino actor, director, and choreographer (1946-2011)

- Born: Feliciano D. Calzado; January 20, 1946; Manila, Philippines
- Died: November 11, 2011 (aged 65); Quezon City, Philippines
- Resting place: Himlayang Pilipino, Tandang Sora, Quezon City
- Other name: Mang Lito
- Education: University of the East
- Occupations: Actor; dancer; director; choreographer; producer
- Years active: 1961–2010
- Spouse: Maria Antonia Ussher (widowed)
- Children: Dash Calzado; Iza Calzado

Feliciano Dilo "Lito" Calzado (January 20, 1946 – November 11, 2011) was a Filipino actor, director, and choreographer.

== Life and career ==
Calzado was born in Manila. While a student at the University of the East, he joined the university folk dance troupe under the direction of Maggie Shea. He also danced for television with Alice Reyes' group and with Amelia Apolinario's group. He danced with the Bayanihan Philippine National Dance Company and the Ballet Folkoric Filipino from 1961 to 1969. As a choreographer, he became dance director of the ABS-CBN Dance Company. Lito Calzado and his dancers which is also known as the "Body Machine" is what he has formed for popular shows. Calzado also directed the Larawan Dance Company, the folk dance group of the Philippine Bureau of Customs.

Calzado married Maria Antonia Ussher, a woman of Irish–Spanish–Filipina descent. He is the father of Iza Calzado. His son Dash Calzado is a member of Legit Misfitz, a Filipino rap group. He later ran an entertainment and management center, and trains dance groups for clubs and other venues in Japan.

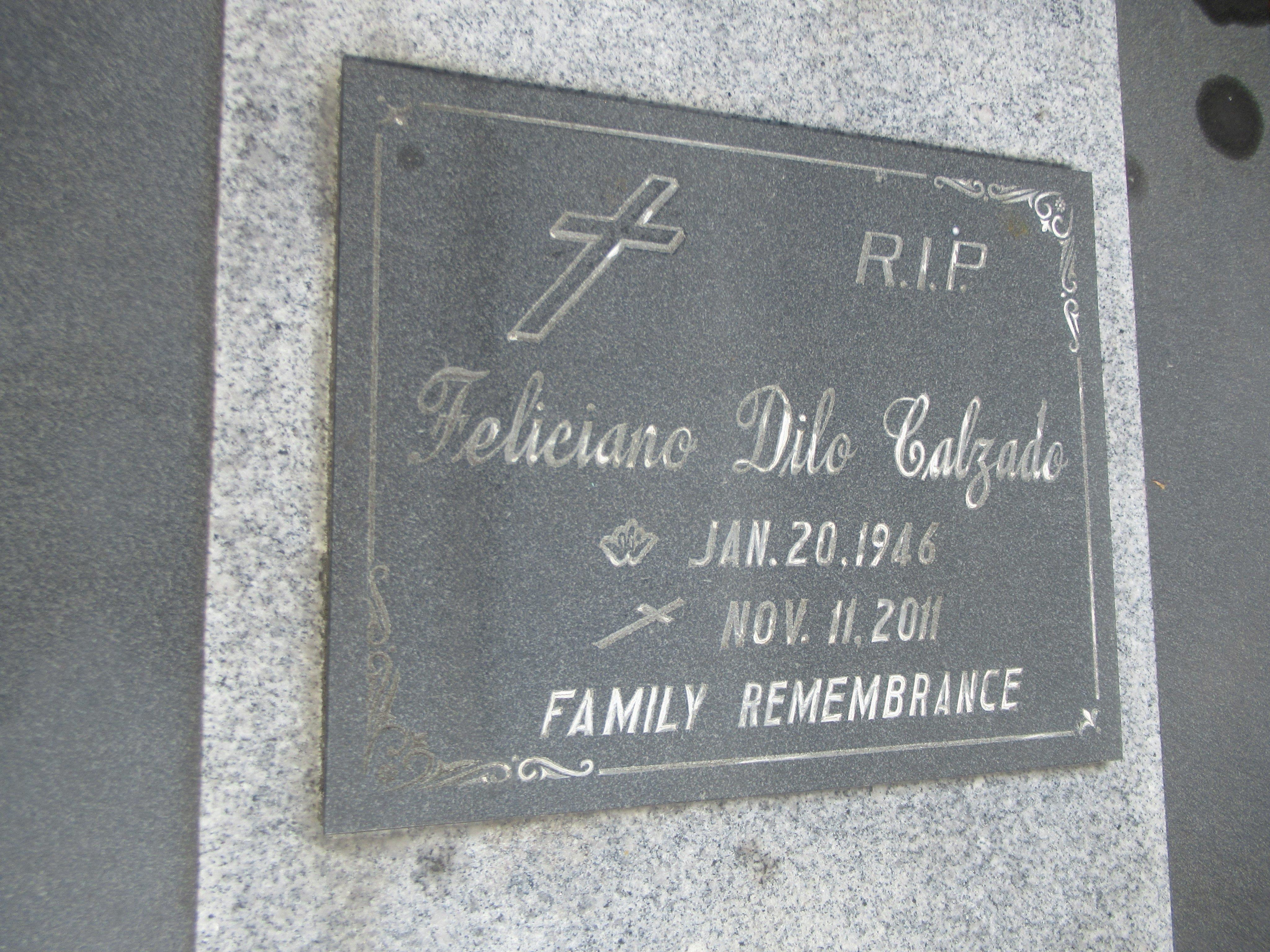
Feliciano Calzado's grave at Himlayang Pilipino Memorial Park (Quezon City).

Calzado died at St. Luke's Medical Center in Quezon City after battling liver cancer for years. He was diagnosed with liver cirrhosis in 2010. He was 65 years old. Lito was cremated and interred beside his wife, Maria Antonia Ussher at Himlayang Pilipino, Tandang Sora, Quezon City on November 14, 2011.

== Filmography ==
=== TV Actor ===
| Year | Title | Role |
|---|---|---|
| 2010 | Daisy Siete (season 26): Adam or Eve | |

=== Movie Actor ===
| Year | Title | Role |
|---|---|---|
| 1968 | Bang-Shang-A-Lang | |
| 1969 | Drakulita | |
| 1970 | Snooky | |
| 1970 | Pritil | |
| 1972 | Rockfest '72 | |
| 1972 | Leron-Leron Sinta | |
| 1973 | Dyesebel | |
| 1973 | Ako'y Paru-Paro, Bulaklak Naman Ako | |
| 1974 | 7 Crazy Uragons | |
| 1975 | Hit and Run | |
| 1978 | Jack 'N Jill of the Third Kind | |
| 1981 | Stariray | |
| 1996 | Isa, Dalawa, Takbo! | Choreographer |
| 2000 | Mana-Mana, Tiba-Tiba | Indu |
| 2000 | Lagarista | Trainor |
| 2000 | The Film Biker | |
| 2002 | S2pid Luv | Club Manager |

=== Choreographer ===
| Year | Title |
|---|---|
| 1969 | Halina Neneng Ko |
| 1969 | Fiesta Extravaganza |
| 1969 | Nora: Simple Girl |
| 1970 | Young Love |
| 1970 | Ricky Na, Tirso Pa! |
| 1970 | Dream of Jeanne |
| 1971 | D'Sensations |
| 1972 | Leron-Leron Sinta |
| 1974 | Batya't Palu-Palo |
| 1978 | Mahal Mo, Mahal Ko |
| 1978 | Jack 'N Jill of the Third Kind |
| 1981 | Stariray |
| 1994 | Walang Matigas na Tinapay Sa Mainit Na Kape |
| 2009 | Nobody Nobody But Juan |

=== Blocking Director ===
| Year | Title |
|---|---|
| 2011 | Miss World Philippines |

=== Producer ===
| Year | Title |
|---|---|
| 1997-2011 | Walang Tulugan with the Master Showman |

=== Cinematographer ===
| Year | Title |
|---|---|
| 1970 | Young Love |

== Awards and Recognitions ==
- 2011 Metro Manila Film Festival - Posthumous Award for Excellence as Director/Choreographer
