= Sundo (2009 film) =

- Theatrical poster
- Directed by: Topel Lee
- Written by: Aloy Adlawan
- Produced by: Jose Mari Abacan; Annette Gozon-Abrogar
- Starring: Robin Padilla
- Cinematography: J.A. Tadena
- Edited by: Marya Ignacio
- Music by: Carmina Robles Cuya
- Production company: GMA Films
- Distributed by: GMA Films
- Release date: March 18, 2009
- Running time: 86 minutes
- Country: Philippines
- Language: Filipino
- Budget: ₱34,500,000.00
- Box office: $1,044,238

Sundo is a 2009 Filipino horror-suspense film directed by Topel Lee, with a script from Aloy Adlawan. The film stars Robin Padilla, Katrina Halili, Rhian Ramos, Hero Angeles, Mark Bautista and Sunshine Dizon. The film was released on March 18, 2009.

== Plot ==
Vanessa is killed after being visited by her long dead husband. The film then cuts to Romano, a retired military operative who goes into seclusion after nearly succumbing to his battle injuries and discovers that he has the ability to see ghosts around people who will soon encounter sudden, disastrous deaths. Worried of his brother, Romano's blind sister Isabel, persuades him to return to Manila with the help of Louella, Romano's childhood friend who is a doctor and harbors affection for him.

An aspiring actress, Kristina, a widow, Lumen, and her nephew, Eric hitch a ride with Romano, Isabel and Louella along with Louella's driver, Baste. On their van's way back to Manila, the group manages to avoid an accident as Romano wakes up just in time to warn Baste, having dreamt of the impending tragedy. As he steps out of the van to survey the scene, he starts seeing ghosts surrounding the van and eventually looking at him. The ghosts are an old man, a young woman with hair covering her face, two more adult men, and a woman who Romano thinks look like his mother. He also hears a baby crying though he is unable to see it. After this, the group stop to eat and rest in a restaurant in Baguio. Just as Lumen mentions that she needs to use the ladies room, one of the male ghosts shows himself to Romano and interacts with him. Soon after, Lumen dies as a rail spike pins her head. Eric dies next of electrocution while attending Lumen's husband's wake, right after the other male ghost grabs Romano to get his attention.

The group now consult with a local elder who informs them that Romano can see ghosts because of an open third eye. Moreover, the ghosts that he sees are "Sundo", or those whom Death uses to fetch a person who is about to die. The Sundo can be anyone such as a spouse, siblings, parents, or a friend who has previously died and has a close relationship with the person. Because Romano prevented the earlier accident from happening when they are "meant" to die, they still "owe" the grim reaper their lives and this debt will be collected regardless. After leaving the elder, the group recall that there were 7 people in the van but Romano only saw 5 ghosts. Romano is unsure whether the ghost of their mom is his or Isabel's Sundo.

Baste and Kristina also did right after their Sundo show themselves to Romano. Baste's Sundo is the old man who turns out to be his grandfather who raised him. Kristina's Sundo is the young woman with hair covering her face who is a twin sister whose existence she never knew. Afterwards, Romano, Isabel and Louella decide to stay in Louella's apartment and spend the night. Louella, feeling emotional and scared, finally confesses to Romano that the ghost of the invisible crying baby is her Sundo, having aborted it after being impregnated while in medical school.

Later on, Romano is lured to the balcony by Isabel as his Sundo. As he realizes that his sister is already dead, Death pushes him over the balcony. Romano lands into the pool and regains consciousness. As he ascends from the pool he sees a distraught Louella crying. She tells him that he cannot be her Sundo, as she already repaid Death with Isabel's life, insisting that she has cheated death and he cannot fetch her. Romano realizes that Louella killed his sister and a flashback of Louella smothering a sleeping Isabel with a pillow is shown. Louella continues to plead to Romano, who then looks at the pool and sees his floating body, revealing that he has died in the water and is now Louella's Sundo.She Swallow her to Romano, but the Grim Reaper was embodied and get her and death goes for a screaming Louella.In the ending, the Grim Reaper lunges at the audience

== Cast ==
- Robin Padilla as Romano
- Sunshine Dizon as Louella
- Rhian Ramos as Isabel
- Katrina Halili as Kristina
- Hero Angeles as Eric
- Mark Bautista as Baste
- Glydel Mercado as Lumen
- Jaclyn Jose as Mercedes
- Iza Calzado as Vanessa

== Reception ==
The film opened with favorable reviews, obtaining a B grade from the Cinema Evaluation Board, and a PG-13 rating from the MTRCB (Movie and Television Review and Classification Board) - the country's film rating system. Critic Nitz Miralles described the film as "a high octane horror", she continuous to praise director Topel Lee for his ability to genuinely scare the audience, as like from his previous horror film efforts like Ouija and Yaya. However, the film is criticized for being "too violent" for a PG-13 movie by critic Veronica R. Samio, whilst praising the film for its fast pace and screenwriter Aloy Adlawan's "shocking" twist ending.

The final gross of the movie is $1,044,238 according to Box Office Mojo.

== Media Release ==
The series was released onto DVD-format and VCD-format by GMA Records. The DVD contained the full-length trailer of the movie. The DVD/VCD was released in 2009.

== Deaths ==
- Vanessa (droppin phone and suicide)
- Mercedes (mirror illusion and fell off the stairs)
- Lumen (wapping the ball and sword)
- Eric (wapping floor and the electric fan burn)
- Kristina (shower and burn face)
- Baste (burning the eyes and truck accident)
- Isabel (suffocated by Louella)
- Romano (blacking shadow monsters and killed monsters)
- Louella (getting into the monsters)

== See also ==
- List of ghost films
- GMA Films
- Ouija (2007 film)
