= Healthy Cravings =

Philippine television show

- Title card
- Genre: Cooking show
- Presented by: Iza Calzado; Jeremy Favia
- Country of origin: Philippines
- Original language: Tagalog

Production
- Camera setup: Multiple-camera setup
- Running time: 30 minutes

Original release
- Network: Q
- Release: 2010 – February 2011

Healthy Cravings is a Philippine television cooking show broadcast by Q. Hosted by Iza Calzado and Jeremy Favia, it premiered in 2010. The show concluded in February 2011.
