= Kaya Kong Abutin ang Langit =

Philippine television drama series

- Title card
- Also known as: Selfish Desires
- Genre: Drama
- Based on: Kaya Kong Abutin ang Langit (1984) by Maryo J. de los Reyes
- Directed by: Topel Lee
- Starring: Iza Calzado; Wendell Ramos
- Theme music composer: Tata Betita
- Opening theme: "Kaya Kong Abutin ang Langit" by Dulce
- Country of origin: Philippines
- Original language: Tagalog
- No. of episodes: 95

Production
- Executive producer: Camille Gomba-Montaño
- Camera setup: Multiple-camera setup
- Running time: 30–45 minutes
- Production company: GMA Entertainment TV

Original release
- Network: GMA Network
- Release: September 28, 2009 – February 5, 2010

Kaya Kong Abutin ang Langit (transl. I can reach the heaven / international title: Selfish Desires) is a Philippine television drama series broadcast by GMA Network. Based on a 1984 Philippine film of the same title, the series is the sixteenth instalment of Sine Novela. Directed by Topel Lee, it stars Iza Calzado and Wendell Ramos. It premiered on September 28, 2009 on the network's Dramarama sa Hapon line up. The series concluded on February 5, 2010, with a total of 95 episodes.

The series is streaming online on YouTube.

== Cast and characters ==
Cast

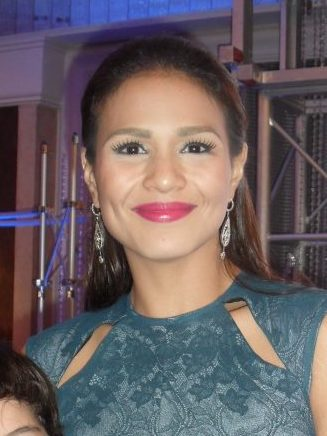
Iza Calzado

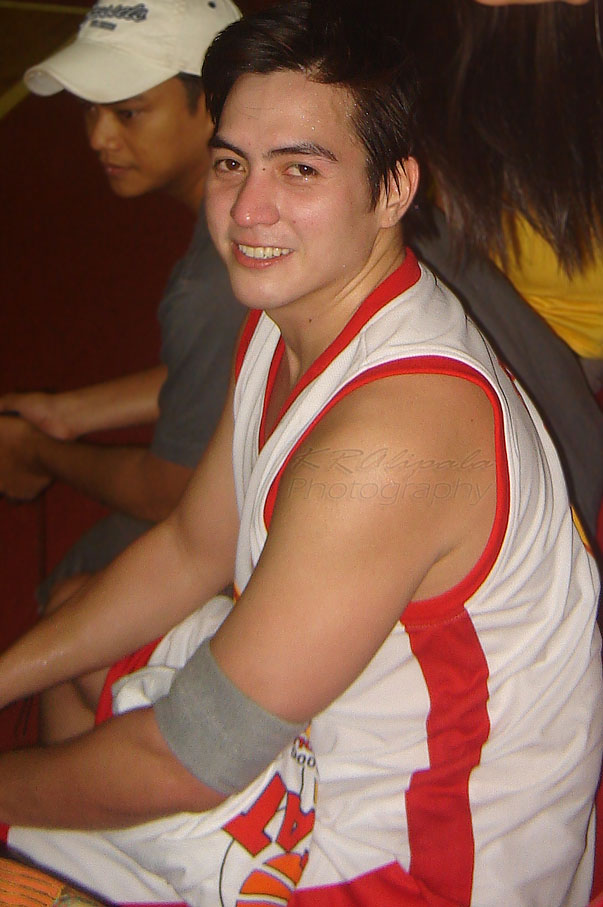
Wendell Ramos

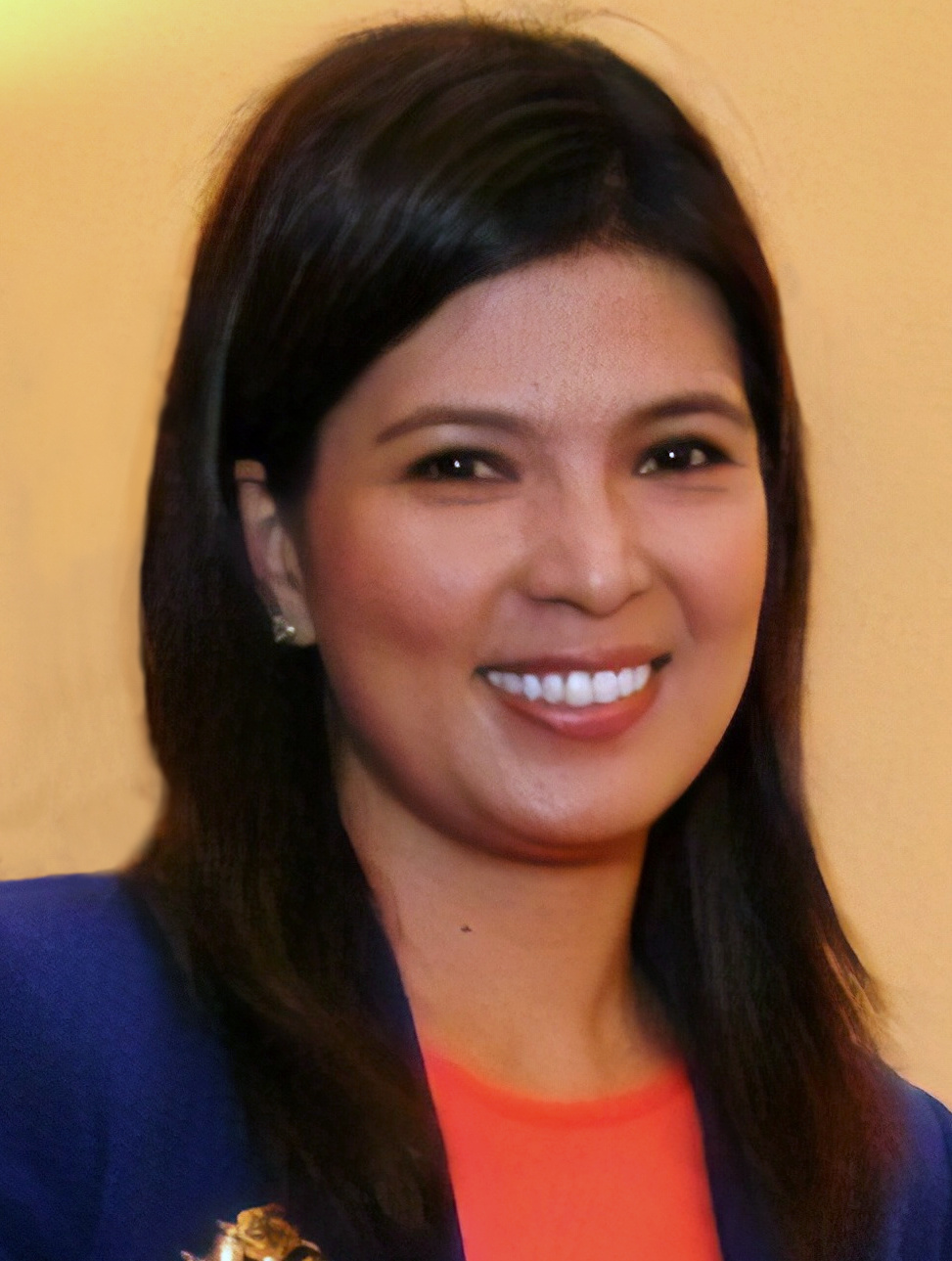
Lani Mercado

Lead cast

- Iza Calzado as Clarissa Rosales / Clarisse Gardamonte
- Wendell Ramos as Daryl Revilla

Supporting cast

- Angelika Dela Cruz as Nancy Rosales
- Chanda Romero as Lucia Enriquez-Recto
- Bobby Andrews as Nick Arnaldo
- Isabel Oli as Therese Gardamonte
- Ricardo Cepeda as Ralph Gardamonte
- Pinky Amador as Monina Arnaldo-Gardamonte
- Lani Mercado as Naty Rosales
- Ehra Madrigal as Victoria Manalo
- Paolo Paraiso as James Rodriguez
- Victor Aliwalas as Jerome Recto
- Steven Silva as Patrick
- Ryan Yllana as Oz
- Peter Serrano as Maurice

Guest cast

- Bianca Umali as younger Nancy
- Jacob Rica as younger Daryl

== Production ==
Principal photography commenced on September 17, 2009.

== Ratings ==
According to AGB Nielsen Philippines' Mega Manila household television ratings, the pilot episode of Kaya Kong Abutin ang Langit earned a 7.5% rating. The final episode scored a 20% rating.
