= Desperadas 2 =

- Theatrical release poster
- Directed by: Joel C. Lamangan
- Written by: Roy C. Iglesias
- Produced by: Lily Y. Monteverde
- Starring: Ruffa Gutierrez; Rufa Mae Quinto; Iza Calzado; Marian Rivera; Ogie Alcasid
- Cinematography: Lyle Sacris
- Edited by: Tara Illenberger
- Music by: Von de Guzman
- Production company: Regal Films
- Distributed by: GMA Films
- Release date: December 25, 2008 (Philippines)
- Running time: 110 minutes
- Country: Philippines
- Language: Filipino
- Box office: ₱50 million

Desperadas 2 (All They Need is Love) is a 2008 Filipino romantic comedy film directed by Joel C. Lamangan and the sequel to Desperadas (2007). The film stars Ogie Alcasid, Marian Rivera, Rufa Mae Quinto, Ruffa Gutierrez, and Iza Calzado. The film was produced by Regal Films and distributed by GMA Pictures

== Plot ==
The four sisters from Desperadas face new problems. The eldest daughter is having problems with her husband. The second was indicted by her friends in estafa cases involving money she loaned. The third, after divorcing her husband due to infidelity and homosexuality, is now a romance psychologist and counselor. The youngest still has problems with her future family-in-law. The problems get worse when their fifth sister (Ogie Alcasid), a leader in an African kingdom, arrives in the Philippines to meet her mother and sisters. She has the solutions for every problem they have, but they must meet her conditions.

== Cast ==
- Ruffa Gutierrez as Isabella Verona
- Rufa Mae Quinto as Dr. Patricia Llanes, PhD
- Iza Calzado as Atty. Stephanie Ocampo-Arribe
- Marian Rivera as Courtney Vallarda-Reyes
- Ogie Alcasid as Lugaluda Lugalolooo-Bantug
- Wendell Ramos as Dave Quinto/Diana
- Jay-R as Vito
- Will Devaughn as Patrick Reyes
- Nova Villa as Margot Solis de Llanes Ocampo Verona Vallarda Manalo
- Christian Vasquez as Congressman Felicito "Fely" Roces
- Alex Castro as Norman Blanco
- Joy Viado† as Lugaluda's Interpreter
- Niña Jose as Cita
- Paulo Avelino as Dr. Anton
- Dion Ignacio as Paul
- Lou Veloso as Ugly Doctor
- Robert Woods as Noel Manalo
- Paul Vincent Magbojos as Peter Quinto
- Sophia Baars as Alexis Verona
- Carl Guevara as Cesar Tan Bantug
- Dido De La Paz as Captain Ababa
- Cecil Magcamit as Yaya Gwyneth
- Nilda Aquino as Yaya Cameron

== Reception ==
=== Accolades ===
- 2008, won Festival Prize for 'Best Makeup' at Metro Manila Film Festival for Noli Villalobos
- 2009, nominated for Star Award as 'New Movie Actor of the Year' for Carl Guevara
