= Batanes: Sa Dulo ng Walang Hanggan =

- Theatrical release poster
- Directed by: Adolfo Alix, Jr.; John David Hukom
- Written by: Arah Jell Badayos
- Produced by: John David Hukom; Patrick Yeung; Teck Ming Yeung; Dennis Lim; Jose Mari Abacan; Annette Gozon-Abrogar
- Starring: Iza Calzado; Ken Chu
- Cinematography: Monchie Redoble
- Edited by: Miren Alvarez-Fabregas
- Music by: Jesse Lucas
- Production companies: GMA Films; Ignite Media
- Distributed by: GMA Films
- Release date: December 5, 2007
- Running time: 100 minutes
- Country: Philippines
- Languages: Filipino; Mandarin; Ivatan
- Box office: ₱25,779,954.48

Batanes: Sa Dulo ng Walang Hanggan, or more popularly known as Batanes, is a 2007 drama film directed by Adolfo Alix, Jr. and John David Hukom. The film stars Iza Calzado and Taiwanese superstar Ken Chu of F4 (which is also from Meteor Garden, playing the role of Xi Men). Batanes is the first Filipino film of Ken Chu and gave Joem Bascon his first award, bagging the Breakthrough Performance by an Actor given by the Golden Screen Awards. The film also features the first mainstream movie appearance of Coco Martin.

== Plot ==
It was a whirlwind romance when Pam meets Ivatan Rico in Manila. She decides to give up her meaningless, stressful city life and follow him to Batanes to meet his parents Boy and Lydia and marry him. The sea immediately intimidates Pam and shows its power, telling her how, with the strong toss of its waves, it can end everything.

Pam tries to adapt to the Ivatan way of life. Pam starts hating the sea that Rico loves so much. Despite all these adjustments, Pam is happy with her new life and with Rico. But everything changes when Rico does not return from fishing. Pam is devastated. She blames no one but the sea. Realizing that she cannot continue living in Batanes without Rico, Pam decides to leave. But before boarding the boat, she realizes that the sea is laughing at her defeat, so Pam decides to stay but she still cannot forget Rico.

On the anniversary of her husband's death, Pam sails to the Ivujos Island. She gets stranded on the island by an angry storm. She then sees a man lying face down in the sand. For a moment, she thinks it is Rico but it turns out to be a Taiwanese, Kao. She administers to his wounds and brings down his fever. When the storm breaks, she drags Kao to her boat and takes him back with her. The villagers are reluctant to accept the Taiwanese, especially Manuel and Boy since most Taiwanese fishermen fish illegally in the waters of Batanes. As Pam takes care of Kao, she starts to be drawn towards him. She starts to feel that he is a kindred soul.

The film explores a relationship between two people from different cultural backgrounds. Set in Batanes, the story follows their developing relationship and examines themes of love, separation, and a woman's connection with the ocean.

In the end, Kao was deported to Taiwan due to help from the local government. Pam eventually loved the ocean more.

== Cast and characters ==
- Iza Calzado as Pam
- Ken Chu as Kao
- Joem Bascon as Rico
- Bembol Roco as Boy
- Daria Ramirez as Lydia
- Sid Lucero as Manuel
- Glaiza de Castro as Melanie
- Coco Martin as Jason
- Mike Tan as Noel
- Julio Diaz as Fred
- Aleth dela Cruz as Gloria
- Pacifico Agor as the taxi driver
- Armand Reyes as the hotel supervisor
- Anna Lyn Tan as hotel receptionist
- Maxie Evangelista as Arnel

== Production ==
Arleen Cuevas, line producer of Ignite Media, told that Adolfo Alix, Jr. directed a film included for the Cinemalaya Philippine Independent Film Festival called Kadin. Kadin was shot in Batanes. Ms. Cuevas also said that Alix fell in love with the place that caused him to approach Ignite Media saying that he wanted to make a film in Batanes because of its romantic setting.

Adolfo Alix, Jr. shared that the role of Pam was originally offered to Judy Ann Santos. Santos was interested to be part of the film but her commitments caused her not to accept the offer. Santos referred Iza Calzado to Adolfo Alix, Jr. After meeting Calzado, they saw that the actress can do "light moments" although Iza always portrays a character in heavy dramas and eventually, Iza got the role. According to an article, in case Calzado did not accept the offer, they may have had approached Jennylyn Mercado.

Dave Hukom, on the other hand, said that they were just looking for any Taiwanese actor for the role of Kao. Arlene Cuevas also did not expect that they would be able to get Ken Chu for the role of Kao. She said that she has a friend who is a producer in Hong Kong so she approached her friend to seek help to get any Chinese actor who is willing to work in the Philippines. The producer replied that they were offering Ken Chu a project before that was to shoot in the Philippines but was not able to push through. After sending the script to Chu, his assistant replied after four to five days saying that they are interested to be part of the film.

== Accolades ==
List of awards and nominations
Award	Date of Ceremony	Category	Nominee	Result	Ref
FAMAS Awards	November 29, 2008	Best Director	Adolfo Alix Jr.	Nominated	
FAMAS Awards	November 29, 2008	Best Cinematography	Monchie Redoble	Won	
FAMAS Awards	November 29, 2008	Best Musical Score	Jesse Lasaten	Nominated	
FAMAS Awards	November 29, 2008	Best Theme Song	Noel Cabangon	Nominated	
Film Academy Awards, Philippines	September 28, 2008	Best Cinematography	Monchie Redoble	Nominated	
Film Academy Awards, Philippines	September 28, 2008	Best Production Design	Cyrus Khan	Nominated	
Golden Screen Awards	June 24, 2008	Breakthrough Performance by an Actor	Joem Bascon	Won	
Golden Screen Awards	June 24, 2008	Best Original Song	Noel Cabangon	Nominated	
Star Awards for Movies	2008	Movie Theme Song of the Year	Jolina Magdangal - Interpreter; Noel Cabangon - Composer	Nominated	
