= Desperadas =

- Directed by: Joel C. Lamangan
- Written by: Roy C. Iglesias
- Produced by: Roselle Monteverde-Teo
- Starring: Ruffa Gutierrez; Rufa Mae Quinto; Iza Calzado; Marian Rivera; Wendell Ramos
- Cinematography: Charlie Peralta
- Edited by: Marya Ignacio
- Music by: Jesse Lucas
- Production company: Regal Films
- Distributed by: GMA Films
- Release date: December 25, 2007 (Philippines)
- Running time: 112 minutes
- Country: Philippines
- Language: Filipino
- Box office: 60 million

Desperadas (subtitled All They Need Is Love) is a 2007 Filipino romantic comedy film written by Roy Iglesias, directed by Joel Lamangan, and starring Marian Rivera, Ruffa Gutierrez, Rufa Mae Quinto and Iza Calzado. The film was followed by the sequel Desperadas 2 in 2008 and produced by Regal Films and distributed by GMA Pictures.

== Plot ==
Four half-siblings with different fathers live in a compound. They have different stories and problems to face. The eldest daughter (Iza Calzado) tries to spice up her marriage with her workaholic husband. The second daughter (Ruffa Gutierrez) is a spendthrift and a single mother who struggles with dating. The third daughter (Rufa Mae Quinto) is a professional sexual and clinical psychologist who obsessively suspects her husband is gay. The youngest (Marian Rivera) is childish and wild, and engaged to a conservative boyfriend from a religious family.

The movie opens with an introduction to the four men in the life of the mother of the siblings. It starts with Philip, a businessman and her first lover, mother of Dr. Patricia Llanes. Emil an actor who wooed his way into his heart, and gave her Stephanie. Then a general, Partirio, whom she was about to marry, who died prematurely, giving birth to Isabella. Finally, a mafia jueteng lord, who became a pastor. They bore a child named Courtney, the youngest.

The movie starts with a birthday party for Courtney who had just become engaged to a previous partner of Isabella, her elder sister.

== Cast ==
- Ruffa Gutierrez as Isabella Verona
- Rufa Mae Quinto as Dr. Patricia Llanes-Quinto, PhD
- Iza Calzado as Atty. Stephanie Ocampo-Arribe
- Marian Rivera as Courtney Vallarda-Reyes
- Wendell Ramos as Dave Quinto
- JayR as Vito
- TJ Trinidad as Dr. Richard Arribe
- Will Devaughn as Patrick Reyes
- Luis Alandy as Mandy
- Ryan Eigenmann as Atty. James LaMadrid
- Nova Villa as Margot Solis de Llanes Ocampo Verona Vallarda Manalo
- Gina Alajar as Patrick's mother
- Tirso Cruz III as Patrick's father
- Menggie Cobarrubias as TV host
- Lyn Tamayo as TV host
- Malouh Crisologo as Patricia's assailant
- Cecile Magcamit as Patricia's maid
- Nilda Aquino as Isabella's maid
- Beng Lopez as Stephanie's maid
- Charlie Davao as Courtney's father
- Emil Sandoval as Patricia's father
- Ernie Zarate as Stephanie's father
- Bon Vibar as Isabella's father
- Racquel Villavicencio as complainant
- Isah Red as Courtney's designer
- Ambet Nabus as Alexis' class adviser

== Recognition ==
=== Awards and nominations ===
- 2007, won Festival Prize for 'Best Make-Up Artist' at Metro Manila Film Festival
- 2007, won 'Gender Sensitive Award' at Metro Manila Film Festival
