= Beauty Queen (TV series) =

Philippine television drama series

- Title card
- Genre: Drama
- Directed by: Joel Lamangan
- Starring: Iza Calzado
- Opening theme: "She" by Jay R
- Country of origin: Philippines
- Original language: Tagalog
- No. of episodes: 80

Production
- Executive producer: Meann P. Regala
- Production locations: Clark, Pampanga
- Camera setup: Multiple-camera setup
- Running time: 30–45 minutes
- Production company: GMA Entertainment TV

Original release
- Network: GMA Network
- Release: October 18, 2010 – February 4, 2011

Beauty Queen is a Philippine television drama series broadcast by GMA Network. Directed by Joel Lamangan, it stars Iza Calzado in the title role. It premiered on October 18, 2010, on the network's Telebabad line-up. The series concluded on February 4, 2011, with a total of 80 episodes.

== Cast and characters ==
Cast

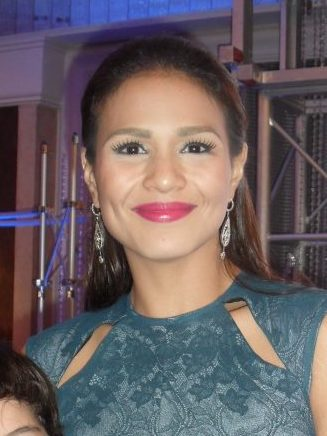
Iza Calzado

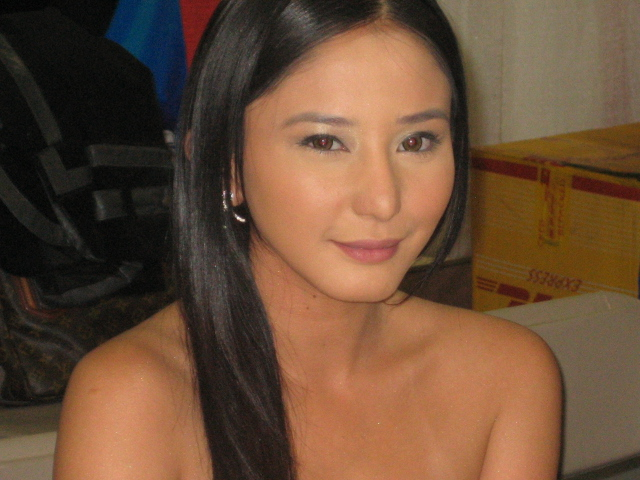
Katrina Halili

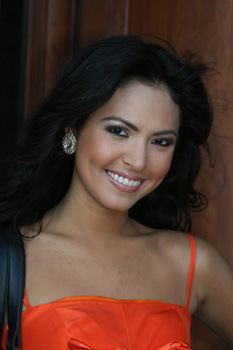
Maggie Wilson

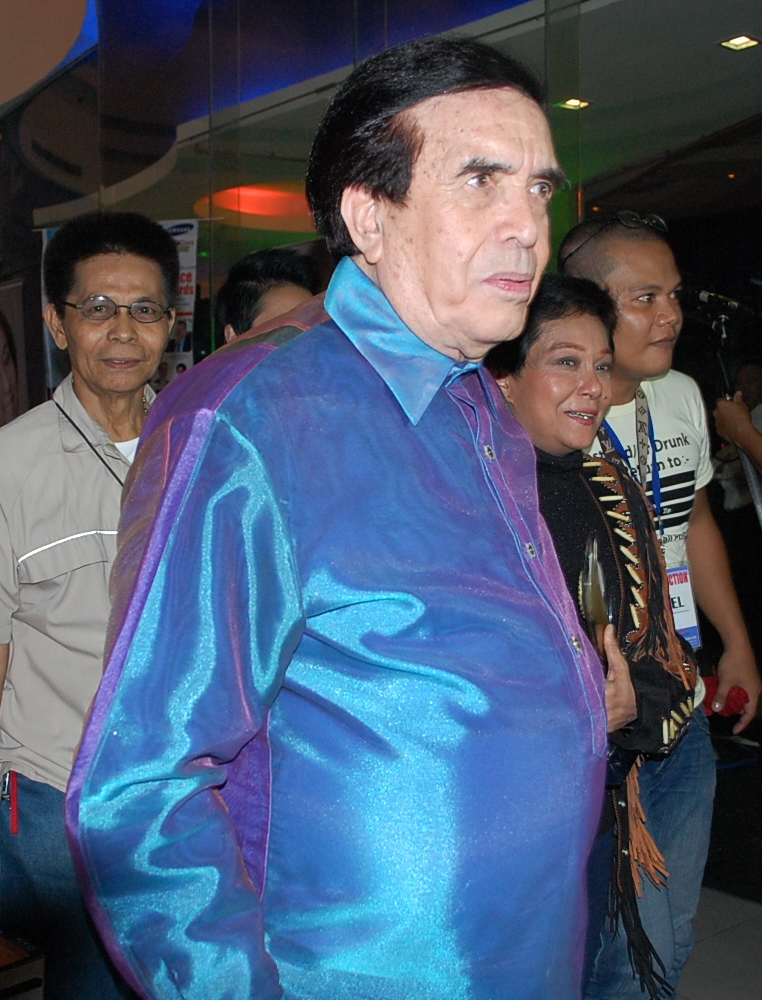
German Moreno

Lead cast

- Iza Calzado as Maita San Miguel

Supporting cast

- Katrina Halili as Dorcas Rivas
- Maggie Wilson as Rebecca Rivas
- TJ Trinidad as Marc Sandoval
- Marvin Agustin as Donald Cervantes
- Luis Alandy as Dante Pineda
- Elizabeth Oropesa as Amparo Matias-San Miguel
- Carmi Martin as Leavida Acuesta-Rivas
- Gloria Diaz as Yuri Sandoval
- German Moreno as Ading
- Juan Rodrigo as Virgilio Rivas
- Bubbles Paraiso as Stefania Luna
- Bembol Roco as Anya / Angelo Castillo
- Marky Lopez as Clifford Almar
- Victor Aliwalas as Greg Almario
- Tomas Gonzales as Zuleyka Mamaril
- Lou Sison as Yeda Marie
- Ricci Chan as Larry / Lara
- Arci Muñoz as Kaye Santos

Guest cast

- Lovi Poe as younger Amparo
- Iwa Moto as younger Leavida
- Daniella Amable as younger Maita
- Gianna Cutler as younger Rebecca
- Angelene Perez as younger Dorcas
- Jay Aquitania as younger Anya
- James Blanco as younger Virgilio
- Jerould Aceron as younger Dante
- Miggs Cuaderno as younger Larry
- Gerard Madrid as Mando San Miguel
- Daria Ramirez as Amparo's mother
- Jan Marini Alano
- Chariz Solomon as Gracia
- Patani as Precious
- Tessbomb as Liza
- Ava Roxas as April
- Janna Dominguez as Amor
- Say Alonzo as Ayra
- Elyn Garsha as Mira
- Marco Alcaraz as himself
- Precious Lara Quigaman as herself
- Will Devaughn as himself
- Pia Guanio as herself
- Jestoni Alarcon as himself
- Kuh Ledesma as herself
- Yassi Pressman as Tina
- Rich Asuncion as Binibini Isla Pilipinas
- Frederick Peralta as himself
- Evangeline Pascual as herself
- Geoff Eigenmann as himself

== Production ==
Principal photography concluded on January 31, 2011, at Fontana Hotel, Clark, Pampanga.

== Ratings ==
According to AGB Nielsen Philippines' Mega Manila People/Individual television ratings, the pilot episode of Beauty Queen earned a 9.5% rating. The final episode scored a 12.6% rating.

== Accolades ==
Accolades received by Beauty Queen
Year	Award	Category	Recipient	Result	Ref.
2011	8th Golden Screen TV Awards	Outstanding Original Drama Series	Beauty Queen	Nominated	
2011	8th Golden Screen TV Awards	Outstanding Performance by an Actress in a Drama Series	Iza Calzado	Nominated	
2011	8th Golden Screen TV Awards	Outstanding Supporting Actor in a Drama Series	Bembol Roco	Nominated	
2011	8th Golden Screen TV Awards	Outstanding Supporting Actress in a Drama Series	Elizabeth Oropesa	Nominated	
