= Somebody to Love (2014 film) =

- Theatrical release poster
- Directed by: Jose Javier Reyes
- Written by: Jose Javier Reyes
- Produced by: Lily Y. Monteverde
- Starring: Carla Abellana; Matteo Guidicelli; Jason Abalos; Isabelle Daza; Iza Calzado
- Production company: Regal Entertainment
- Distributed by: Regal Entertainment
- Release date: August 20, 2014
- Country: Philippines
- Language: Filipino
- Box office: US$102,648.00

Somebody to Love is a 2014 Filipino film produced by Regal Entertainment. It was directed by Jose Javier Reyes.

== Cast ==
- Carla Abellana as Sabrina
- Matteo Guidicelli as Tristan
- Jason Abalos as Nicco
- Isabelle Daza as Valeria
- Iza Calzado as Marga
- Maricar Reyes as Sophie
- Ella Cruz as Amelie
- Kiray Celis as Chloe
- Albie Casiño as Jason
- Alex Castro as Rainier
- Manuel Chua as Yves

== Production ==
Somebody to Love brought together stars from rival television networks. Carla Abellana received top billing; Iza Calzado stated that she accepted that situation because she knew that Abellana was also a contract star of Regal Films, and that she preferred to be defined by "how [her] role will make a mark" rather than the order of names.

== Reviews ==
Oggs Cruz, writing for Rappler, stated that the frequent use of split screen to emphasize that two separate events were taking place simultaneously made for an "intriguing viewing experience" but also described it as sometimes "quite grating".

== See also ==
- List of Filipino films in 2014
