= Bliss (2017 film) =

2017 Filipino psychological thriller film

- Theatrical release poster
- Directed by: Jerrold Tarog
- Written by: Jerrold Tarog
- Produced by: Darlene Malimas
- Starring: Iza Calzado; Ian Veneracion; TJ Trinidad; Adrienne Vergara; Michael de Mesa
- Cinematography: Mackie Galvez
- Edited by: Jerrold Tarog
- Music by: Jerrold Tarog
- Production companies: TBA; Artikulo Uno Productions; Quantum Films (Note: The film is a joint production between TBA (Tuko Film Productions, Buchi Boy Entertainment, Artikulo Uno Productions), Artikulo Uno Productions, and Quantum Films, thus the first two entities should be held separate.)
- Release dates: March 5, 2017 (Japan); May 10, 2017 (Philippines)
- Running time: 100 minutes
- Country: Philippines
- Language: Filipino

Bliss is a 2017 Filipino psychological thriller film written, directed, edited and scored by Jerrold Tarog. It stars Iza Calzado, Ian Veneracion, TJ Trinidad, Michael de Mesa, and Adrienne Vergara. The film competed in Japan at the 12th Osaka Asian Film Festival in March 2017 to critical acclaim, where Calzado also garnered the Yakushi Pearl Award for Best Performer. The film premiered in the Philippines on May 10.

Bliss explores elements of a film within a film narrative where the protagonist also plays the lead.

== Synopsis ==
Jane Ciego (Iza Calzado), a successful actress, produces her own film to gain respect from the industry. During the film production, an accident leaves her disabled. She is left in a secluded house to avoid more attention from the press, under the care and supervision of her husband, Carlo (TJ Trinidad) and a cruel, unusual nurse named Lilibeth (Adrienne Vergara). Trapped in her own home, as she experiences horrors she questions her sanity.

== Cast ==
- Iza Calzado as Jane Ciego
- Ian Veneracion as Joshua
- TJ Trinidad as Carlo
- Adrienne Vergara as Lilibeth
- Shamaine Buencamino as Jillian
- Audie Gemora as Lexter Palao
- Stephanie Sol
- Michael de Mesa
- Star Orjaliza
- Kakki Teodoro as female reporter 2

== Production ==
Director Jerrold Tarog pitched the idea for Bliss—which composed of five stories—right after the Philippine commercial release of Heneral Luna, a film that he also directed. His first choice for the lead role had been Anne Curtis but the latter turned it down. After auditioning several actresses, the role eventually went to Iza Calzado.

Tarog took roughly three to four months to write the screenplay. He credited foreign films such as Ingmar Bergman's Persona, Misery, and anything by Japanese director Satoshi Kon—most notably his films Perfect Blue (1997) and Millennium Actress (2001)—as inspirations in crafting the film. Tarog scored the film for about three weeks.

== Marketing ==
Bliss' teaser trailer was released by February 2017, followed by an official trailer the following month.

== Release ==
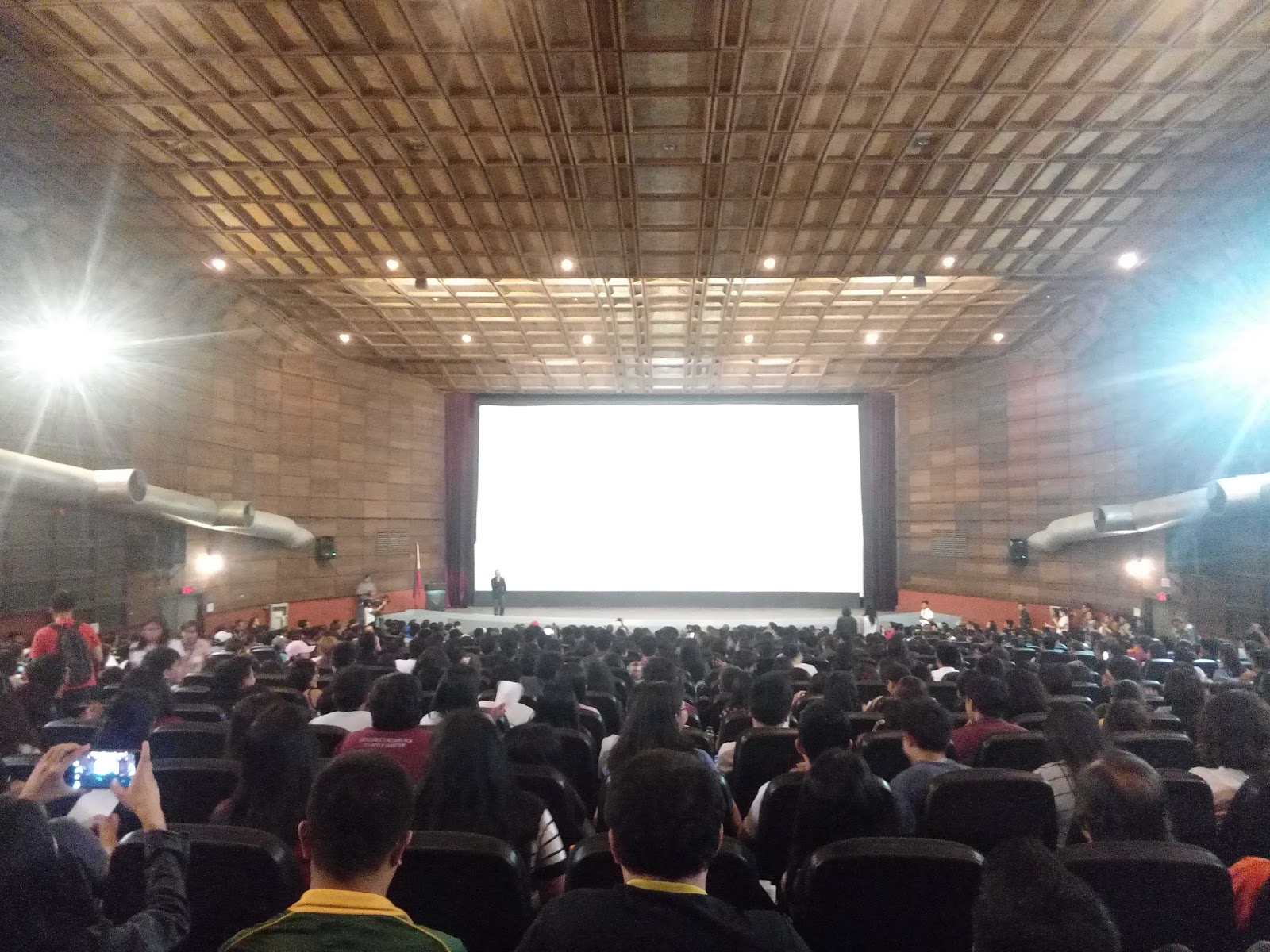
During a special screening of the film's uncut version at the Cine Adarna, UP Diliman, Quezon City, April 3, 2017

Bliss first premiered in Japan, as an entry to the 12th Osaka Asian Film Festival held from March 3 to 12, 2017. The film was well received during its run at the festival. Accordingly, the festival awarded Iza Calzado the Yakushi Pearl Award for Best Performer award which she accepted on March 11.

In the Philippines, the film was originally rated "X" by the Movie and Television Review and Classification Board due to its depiction of excessive nudity and violence, and masturbation, deeming it unsuitable for public consumption. One of the board members noted the nudity to be "gratuitous".

The producers held a special free screening of the uncut version at the Cine Adarna in the University of the Philippines Diliman, Quezon City on April 3, 2017. On April 5, Tarog confirmed through his Instagram profile that the film had been reevaluated to an "R-18" rating without cuts.

== Reception ==
Oggs Cruz of CNN Philippines called it "...a well-crafted film, one that even outshines Heneral Luna in terms of consistency, and heck, even ambition." He concluded that Bliss is a film "whose pleasures aren’t immediate. It isn’t as emotionally rousing as Heneral Luna or Sana Dati, whose themes of nationalism or romantic love, respectively, are things that provoke effortlessly. Bliss seems to be more cerebral, a work that forces its viewers to think before they feel." Rose Carmelle Lacuata of ABS-CBN News said that Iza Calzado's performance "...was able to effectively play the role of an actress trapped in her own world. It is not surprising that she was given the Yakushi Pearl Award for Best Performer in the 2017 Osaka Asian Film Festival." Jam Pascual of The Philippine Star's "Young Star" column said "Bliss is a brainy change of pace ... [T]he artistic merits of the film alone should be enough to validate this film's existence – both Iza [Calzado] and Adrienne [Vergara] shine in their roles, with the latter so terrifying she makes the maid from Get Out look like Winnie the Pooh.
