= Etiquette for Mistresses =

- Theatrical movie poster
- Directed by: Chito S. Roño
- Screenplay by: Patrick John Valencia; Kriz G. Gazmen
- Story by: Chito S. Roño
- Based on: Etiquette for Mistresses by Jullie Yap-Daza
- Starring: Kris Aquino; Claudine Barretto; Kim Chiu; Iza Calzado; Cheena Crab
- Cinematography: Neil Daza
- Edited by: Carlo Francisco Manatad
- Music by: Carmina Cuya
- Production company: ABS-CBN Film Productions, Inc.
- Distributed by: Star Cinema
- Release date: September 30, 2015
- Running time: 122 minutes
- Country: Philippines
- Language: Filipino
- Box office: ₱₱93,060,831.36 (Domestic Gross)

Etiquette for Mistresses is a 2015 Filipino romantic drama film directed by Chito S. Roño. Adapted from the 1993 novel of the same name by Jullie Yap-Daza, it features an ensemble cast including Kris Aquino, Claudine Barretto, Iza Calzado, Cheena Crab and Kim Chiu. The film tackles the lives of five successful and glamorous women whose friendship is based on their common weaknesses—they are all trapped in the prison of their hearts.

The film is also the first Filipino film to open simultaneously nationwide and worldwide in Europe, Middle East, and North America. The film opens with 15 million pesos on its opening day and received positive reviews from movie critics for its cinematography and unique storyline.

== Plot ==
Georgia, Stella, and Charley watch a video scandal of a mistress caught by the wife. Charley tells them that she experienced the same scenario and instead watches the movie with her kids at a supermarket to avoid the wife. Stella ends the conversation that she only meets her lover, well-known broadcast commentator Ambet Villoria at home to avoid any scandal. In a lounge bar, Chloe, the most rebellious mistress is embarrassed her credit card being cancelled by her lover Gabriel. In anger she throws her phone accidentally not knowing someone was hurt. Stella helps her out of prison but asks her not to tell the other girls what happened.

Meanwhile, Georgia is tasked by her lover to train a new woman of Frank Ayson, a rich politician and her lover's boss. She reluctantly agrees and meets up with Stella in a coffee shop to get advice before going to the airport to meet Ina, the new mistress. Ina is ecstatic at first but becomes depressed after learning from Georgia that despite having a condo and a luxurious life, she cannot live with Frank, for whom she left her life in Cebu. She is even more frustrated by the rules given by Georgia, which includes never calling Frank and never showing herself in front of him unless he asks her to. She ends up depressed as the days pass and overdoses herself on alcohol. Georgia rushes her to the hospital where she meets Chloe.

The next day, Georgia introduce Ina to Stella, Chloe and Charley. The girls start to form a stronger friendship and bond at a mall and a beauty salon using Charley's credit card. Ina meets up with Frank at a Christmas caravan with Chloe's help. Georgia angrily tells Ina that she should not break her rules. Chloe discovers that Gabriel has another mistress.

In Georgia's absence, Ina stays with Charley and accompanies her to an auction but she is caught by Wang Gie's wife and suspended from going out. Ina chooses to stay with Stella in a court room but an accident causes Stella to fly abroad leaving Ina alone. She decides to go back to Cebu to reunite with her family, but is disappointed when she sees that they have learned to live a life without her. This convinces Ina to stay as a mistress.

Ina attends Senator Adelle Ayson's birthday party to get a glimpse of Frank with Chloe's assistance. Georgia is horrified in the meeting of the two and confronts Chloe. The incident separates Chloe from the rest of the group. A news breaks out that Ambet is missing and the mistresses reunite with Stella who is hiding him in a safe house. Prior to the accident, Ambet is diagnosed with cancer and is terminally ill. After a talk with Gabriel's wife, Chloe faces her friends again but nobody is interested to listen to her realization that their lovers will never choose them.

The girls learn that the police found their location through Chloe. Charlie decides to break a rule in order for Stella and Ambet escape using Frank's influence and Wang Gie's plane. Georgia has one more rule for Ina and both of them leave their partners.

Chloe then accepts the job that was offered to her, Stella visits Ambet's grave, Charley returns to the Philippines with her two kids, Georgia marries a guy with twins and Ina becomes a singer and marries a handsome man.

== Cast and characters ==
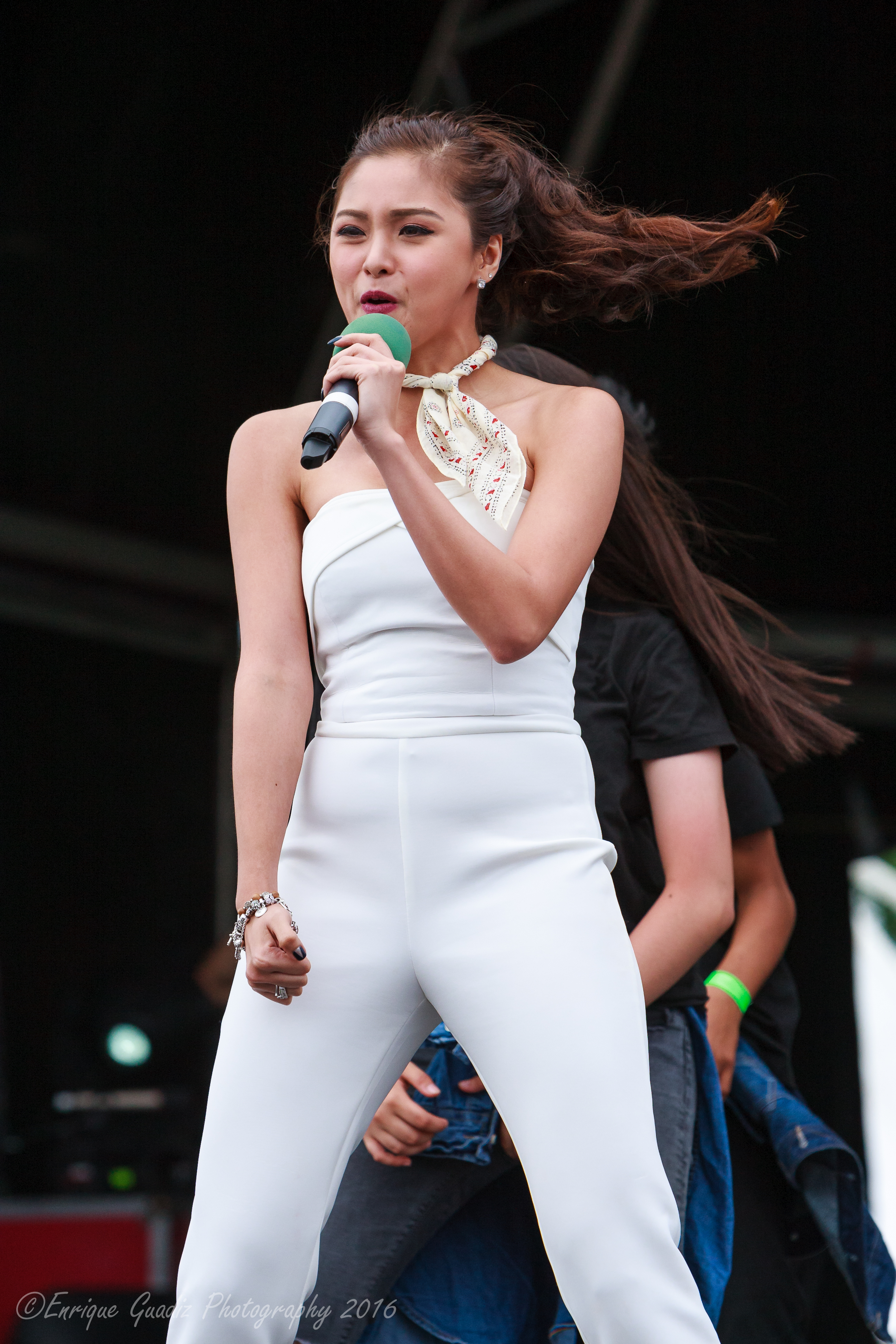
Kim Chiu portrays Ina Del Prado

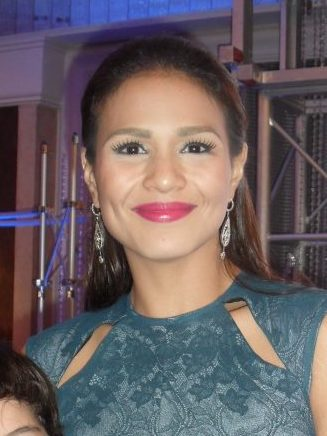
Iza Calzado portrays Stella Garcia

=== The Mistresses ===
- Kris Aquino as Georgia Torres - The oldest among the mistresses, a chef and successful owner of a high class restaurant. She is the most proper and well mannered among the group who teaches them with the rules she kept.
- Kim Chiu as Innamorata "Ina" Del Prado - a Cebuana lounge singer who fell in love with the rich politician Frank Ayson. She left her life at Cebu in exchange of living together with Frank but ended up stuck in the condo unit bought for her by Frank. She is the youngest among the mistresses.
- Claudine Barretto as Chloe Zamora - The most fearless and reckless mistress. She works as a creative director at an advertising agency and often takes risks to meet her lover even if the wife is in the same place. She is the rule breaker among the group.
- Iza Calzado as Stella Garcia - A no-nonsense lawyer and mistress of the broadcaster Ambet Villoria. She believes in true love and happy ending on mistresses.
- Cheena Crab as Charley Mariquit - The richest mistress among the group who treats her friends with leisures. She is cheerful and generous and mother of two children.

=== Supporting cast ===
- Helen Gamboa as Conchita San Diego - she is a philanthropist and most respected of the group of women the women look up to her and Georgia admires her
- Tirso Cruz III as Ambrosio "Ambet" Villoria
- Eddie Gutierrez as Gabriel "Gab" Castronuevo
- Freddie Webb as Roberto "Rob" Mariano
- Zoren Legaspi as Frank Ayson
- Cherry Pie Picache as Betsie Galvez-Villoria
- Aiko Melendez as Senator Adelina "Adelle" Ayson
- Pilar Pilapil as Eliza Castronuevo
- Sam Concepcion as the Young Guy
- Divine Aucina as Leah (Ina's Friend)
- Arci Muñoz as Amanda
- Candy Pangilinan as Joy del Prado/Ina's Eldest Sister

=== Guest appearances ===
- Derek Ramsay as Arthur Clemente
- Piolo Pascual as Edward Cervantes
- Yayo Aguila as Marla
- Dexter Doria as Alicia
- Kyline Alcantara as Charley's daughter
- Yuan Carido as Charley's son
- Chinggoy Alonzo† as Ramon
- Menggie Cobarrubias† as Dr. Santiago
- Jenny Miller as Tara
- Mel Kimura as Mrs. Eroles
- Manuel Chua as Manuel
- Chokoleit† as Bailey
- Rina Inojales as Dionesia
- AJ Dee as an unnamed man in the car
- Ahwel Paz as Ezra
- Angie Ferro† as Aling Mau Mau
- Sophia Lim as an unnamed girl in mall

== Production ==
=== Filming ===
The production team started to shoot the film in early July 2015, the moment when Kris officially got back for the film and finished early September 2015.

=== Casting ===
In August 2014, Gretchen Barretto was originally slated for the film, stating that she perfectly fits the role. However, she was not selected in the final casting for undisclosed reasons. Judy Ann Santos was also offered to be part of the film. However, she later turned down the offer for unknown reasons.

The film stars Claudine Barretto, who came back to the business after two years of hiatus, this also serves as her comeback launching with Star Cinema and ABS-CBN, Kim Chiu, Iza Calzado, Cheena Crab (who also came back to the Philippines after migrating to the States) and Kris Aquino, who backed out at first but was convinced to play the role later.

=== Music ===
- The official theme song of the film is "You Don't Own Me" performed by Lani Misalucha. The song was originally performed by Lesley Gore and was included in the soundtrack of the film The First Wives Club. It was written and composed by John Madara and Dave White.
- Kim Chiu recorded two songs for the film "Duyog" and "Labyu Langga" as part of its soundtrack.
- Alex Gonzaga recorded song for the film "Break Na Tayo" in minus one in behind the scenes.

== Reception ==
=== Box office ===
On its first week, the film earned P63,681,347.00 on its first week run in theaters which premiered on September 30. The film, through its 4-week run earned ₱93,060,831.36 according to Box Office Mojo.

=== Critical response ===
The film received a lot of positive reviews because of its unique story line and cinematography. According to Rappler, ''Etiquette for Mistresses' is a breath of fresh air amidst the countless films about infidelity that offer nothing more than outrageous confrontations as cheap entertainment." says movie critic Oggs Cruz. According to Philbert Dy of www.ClickTheCity.com, "‘Etiquette for Mistresses’ is Worth Considering, Even After it Falls Apart.", he gave a rating of 3.5 out of 5 stars.

Etiquette for Mistresses received a Grade B from Cinema Evaluation Board of the Philippines.
