= One True Love (2008 film) =

- Promotional poster of One True Love
- Directed by: Mac C. Alejandre
- Screenplay by: Irma Dimaranan
- Story by: Anette Gozon-Abrogar; Irma Dimaranan; Maryo J. de los Reyes
- Produced by: Lily Y. Monteverde; Annette Gozon-Abrogar
- Starring: Dingdong Dantes; Marian Rivera; Iza Calzado
- Cinematography: Mo Zee
- Edited by: Sheryll Lopez
- Music by: Von de Guzman
- Production companies: Regal Entertainment; GMA Films
- Distributed by: GMA Films
- Release date: November 19, 2008
- Running time: 118 minutes
- Country: Philippines
- Language: Filipino
- Box office: ₱92 million

One True Love is a 2008 Filipino romantic film directed by Mac Alejandre. The film stars Dingdong Dantes and Marian Rivera, with Iza Calzado. The film was released in the Philippines on November 19, 2008.

== Plot ==
Migs Mijares (Dingdong Dantes) was so in love with Joy (Marian Rivera) that in less than a year of relationship, he asked for her hand in marriage. Even when Bela (Iza Calzado), the childhood sweetheart of Migs, returned from Canada and made an attempt to win him back, Migs's decision to marry his present girlfriend was resolute.

But early on, a tragedy struck the blissful marriage of Migs and Joy. Migs had an accident, which caused his isolated retrograde amnesia. His last memory was that of his first and ex-girlfriend, and he forgot everything about his wife. Joy did her best to bring her marriage back to normal, but Migs could not feel any emotional connection with her. Meanwhile, Bela tried her best to distance herself from her Migs, but the latter was persistent.

In an effort to continue to save her marriage, Joy became interfering. She always checked the whereabouts of Migs and monitored his calls. This provoked Migs to make a choice: to be with his first love. Joy made the last effort by talking to Bela but the meeting was futile. At first, Migs and Bela were happy. However, after a while, Migs started missing his wife. He became confused again, and slowly, he began to realize which girl was really his one true love.

== Cast and characters ==
=== Main cast ===
- Marian Rivera as Joy Mejares
- Dingdong Dantes as Dr. Miguel "Migs" Mejares
- Iza Calzado as Bela

=== Supporting cast ===
- Bianca King as Ara Mejares
- Jennica Garcia as Raya
- Tessie Tomas as Julie Robles
- Boots Anson-Roa as Lola
- Chinggoy Alonzo as Atty. Julian Mijares
- Pinky Marquez as Margarita Mijares
- Sheena Halili as Lily
- Sharlene San Pedro as Sandra
- Vaness del Moral as Mimi
- Alex Castro as Mike

=== Cameo role ===
- Atty. Adel Tamano
- Atty. Annette Gozon-Abrogar
- Roselle Monteverde-Teo

== Reception ==
Performances by Dantes and Rivera was raved, but it was Calzado who received the most praise as Manila Bulletin dubs her as "pure crocodile tears". Film critic Karen A. Pagsolingan pointed out that Calzado's "eyes were expressive, and her delivery of lines impressive. There were several scenes where she rendered me speechless". The final gross of the movie is ₱94,422,592.00 according to Box Office Mojo.
