= Culion (film) =

2019 Filipino historical drama film by Alvin Yapan

- Theatrical poster
- Directed by: Alvin Yapan
- Screenplay by: Ricky Lee
- Produced by: Mark Shandii Bacolod
- Starring: Iza Calzado; Jasmine Curtis-Smith; Meryll Soriano
- Cinematography: Neil Daza
- Edited by: Mai Dionisio
- Music by: Hiroko Nagai; Harold Andre Cruz Santos
- Production companies: iOptions Ventures Corp.; Team MSB
- Distributed by: Cine Screen
- Release dates: December 14, 2019 (Culion, Palawan); December 25, 2019 (MMFF)
- Running time: 136 minutes
- Country: Philippines
- Language: Filipino

Culion is a 2019 historical drama film directed by Alvin Yapan, starring Iza Calzado, Jasmine Curtis-Smith, and Meryll Soriano. Set in the 1940s, it tells the story of three women seeking a cure of leprosy. The name derives from the eponymous island in Palawan once known as a major leper colony.

== Synopsis ==
Three women afflicted with leprosy live a life of stigmatization in Culion at a time when the disease is considered a life sentence.

== Cast ==
=== Main cast ===
- Iza Calzado as Ana
- Jasmine Curtis-Smith as Doris
- Meryll Soriano as Ditas
- Joem Bascon as Kanor
- Mike Liwag as Jaime
- Suzette Ranillo as Nay Mameng

=== Special guest appearance ===
- John Lloyd Cruz

=== Supporting cast ===
- Joel Saracho as Father Salvino
- Nico Locco as Fred
- Simon Ibarra as Dr. Cuevas
- Lee O'Brian as Colony Chief
- Mayen Estañero as Azon
- VJ Mendoza as Kulas
- Mai Fanglayan as Mabel
- Mercedes Cabral
- Upeng Fernandez as Donya
- Aaron Concepcion as Miguel
- Denise Nayve as Osang
- DMS Boongaling as Goryo
- Elisa Weber as Sister Yvette
- Elle Velasco as Malou
- Erlinda Villalobos as Elena
- Jack Love Falcis as Nune
- Jaepheth Cortez as Pining
- Jai Astor as Juana
- Jay Garcia as Tonyo
- Luminita Gamboa as Sister Cicelle
- Marcus Dreeke as Jesuit Priest
- Nikko Delos Santos as Amado
- Raflesia Bravo as Soledad
- Rex Lantano as Dado
- Roven Alejandro as Paeng
- Ruth Alferez as Milagros
- Tommy Roca as Henry
- Yam Mercado as Badong
- Earl Andrew Figueroa as Ding

== Production ==
Culion was produced under iOptions Ventures Corp. which is owned by Palawan-based businesspersons Peter and Gilie Sing. The film is the first produced by the production studio. Culion was directed by Alvin Yapan with the script made by Ricky Lee, the cinematography by Neil Daza, and the production by Mark Shandii Bacolod.

The production team sought consent from the local leaders and residents of Culion to produce their film on the island and promised to have the film screened first on the island. They also secured an endorsement from Dr. Arturo Cunanan Jr., head of the Culion Sanitarium and General Hospital, and Virginia de Vera, the town's mayor. Filming took two weeks with a crew of about 150 people.

== Release ==
The film had its world premiere at Culion, Palawan on December 14, 2019, in honor of the island's past. It had a wider release on December 25, 2019, as one of the eight entries of the 2019 Metro Manila Film Festival.

== Reception ==
=== Accolades ===
Year	Award / Film Festival	Category	Recipient(s)	Result	Ref
2019	45th Metro Manila Film Festival	Special Jury Prize (cast)	Culion	Won	
2019	MMFF Hall of Fame Awards	Best Screenplay/Story	Ricky Lee	Won	
2020	7th Urduja Heritage Film Awards	Best Heritage Film	Culion	Won	
2020	7th Urduja Heritage Film Awards	Best Actress	Iza Calzado	Won	
2020	7th Urduja Heritage Film Awards	Best Supporting Actor	Mike Liwag	Won	
2020	7th Urduja Heritage Film Awards	Best Supporting Actress	Suzette Ranillo	Won	
2020	7th Urduja Heritage Film Awards	Best Director	Alvin Yapan	Won	

== See also ==
- Culion
- Culion leper colony
- Leprosy
- Leprosy stigma
