= Sigaw =

2004 Filipino horror film

- US release poster
- Directed by: Yam Laranas
- Written by: Roy Iglesias; Yam Laranas
- Produced by: William Lao; Roselle Y. Monteverde
- Starring: Richard Gutierrez; Angel Locsin; Jomari Yllana; Iza Calzado; James Blanco
- Cinematography: Yam Laranas
- Edited by: Manet A. Dayrit
- Music by: Jesse Lucas
- Production companies: Regal Entertainment; Megavision Films
- Distributed by: Regal Entertainment
- Release date: December 25, 2004
- Running time: 110 minutes
- Country: Philippines
- Language: Filipino
- Box office: ₱25.3 million

Sigaw (lit. 'Shout'), internationally known as The Echo, is a 2004 Filipino supernatural horror film directed by Yam Laranas. It stars Richard Gutierrez and Angel Locsin (both from Mulawin). It was one of the entries in the 2004 Metro Manila Film Festival, becoming a box office success in the Philippines where the horror genre has become increasingly popular. In 2005, the film received a release in both Singapore and Malaysia.

An American remake of the film was made in 2008, entitled The Echo.

== Plot ==
Marvin savors his independence in a newly acquired unit of an old apartment building. He is frequently visited by his girlfriend Pinky. Except for the occasional noise from an apartment unit down the hallway, the place is almost perfect for Marvin. At the end of the hallway is where Anna lives with her young daughter Lara, and Bert, her jealous husband. Bert is a cop, and he has always suspected Anna of cheating on him. His frequent jealous outbursts would always lead to beatings that could be heard throughout the whole floor. Marvin would usually be awakened at night by the sound of screaming and beating from Anna's unit. Marvin complains to the building caretaker, a drunk, who would just tell him to ignore the disturbance from the apartment down the hall. Anna and her daughter would usually ask for help from Jude, who lives in an apartment unit in the middle of the hallway. Jude's apartment becomes a temporary refuge for the little girl Lara.

One day, Pinky drops by Marvin's apartment and is shocked to see a woman knocking on his door. Pinky suspects Marvin is seeing another girl, which could explain why he has been acting strange lately. Marvin vehemently denies seeing another woman. It is the strange occurrences in his apartment that is making him act strange lately. Meanwhile, the beatings down the hall intensify. Jude is getting scared because the cruel cop Bert is beginning to suspect that Jude is having an affair with Anna, which isn't true. Marvin gets drawn to the couple's frequent quarrels. He even witnesses Bert chasing Anna and beating her up in the corridor. All that violence affects Marvin. At length, he musters the courage to find out more about the quarreling couple. What he finds out shocks him. Marvin uncovers a secret that will change his life and Pinky's as well. The discovery sets into motion a series of hauntings that follow him and Pinky around. He decides to leave his apartment but the hauntings follow them wherever they go. Marvin finally decides to confront the problem. He returns to the old apartment building to face the evil that dwells in it. What happens next shakes the very core of his beliefs about life, love, and the spirit world.

== Cast ==
- Richard Gutierrez as Marvin
- Angel Locsin as Pinky
- Jomari Yllana as Bert
- Iza Calzado as Anna
- James Blanco as Jude
- Ella Guevara as Lara
- Lui Manansala as Marvin's Mother
- Tessie Villarama as Pinky's Mother
- Pocholo Montes as Pinky's Father
- Ronnie Lazaro as Dante, the Caretaker

== Awards ==
Year	Award-Giving Body	Category	Work	Result
2004	Metro Manila Film Festival	Best Child Performer	Ella Guevarra	Won
2004	Metro Manila Film Festival	Best Editing	Manet Dayrit	Won
2004	Metro Manila Film Festival	Best Sound Recording		Won
