= Milan (2004 film) =

2004 romantic drama film by Olivia M. Lamasan

- Theatrical release poster
- Directed by: Olivia M. Lamasan
- Screenplay by: Moira Lang (Note: Credited as Raymond Lee; Lee became Moira Lang in 2013.); Olivia M. Lamasan
- Story by: Moira Lang
- Produced by: Charo Santos-Concio; Malou N. Santos; Marizel Samson-Martinez
- Starring: Claudine Barretto; Piolo Pascual
- Cinematography: Shayne Sarte-Clemente
- Edited by: Marya Ignacio
- Music by: Raul Mitra
- Production company: Star Cinema
- Distributed by: ABS-CBN Film Productions
- Release date: February 11, 2004 (Philippines)
- Running time: 135 minutes
- Country: Philippines
- Languages: Filipino; Italian
- Budget: ₱30 million (estimated)
- Box office: ₱135.88 million

Milan is a 2004 Philippine romantic drama film directed by Olivia M. Lamasan and co-written by Moira Lang. Set in the city of Milan in Italy, the film stars Claudine Barretto and Piolo Pascual, with the supporting cast including Iza Calzado, Ilonah Jean, Lotlot de Leon, and Ryan Eigenmann.

Produced and distributed by ABS-CBN Film Productions, the film was theatrically released in the Philippines on February 11, 2004, and it grossed over ₱130 million.

== Synopsis ==
The story follows the journey of naive Lino as he searches for his missing wife, Mary Grace, in Italy. He comes across Jenny, an imposing figure in the Filipino community of migrant workers, whose dreams of grandeur have clouded her need for personal relationships. In a desperate quest for game and survival, the two find refuge and affirmation in each other. What started as a mentor–protégé relationship, Lino and Jenny’s partnership evolves beautifully into a self-consuming love affair. Until these are put to the test. Reality bites as the land changes everything.

In the end, it matters not that Lino finds his wife, for he has found himself. And alas, it matters not for Jenny that she sacrifices for love, for she has learned to give, to live again.

== Cast ==
=== Main cast ===
- Claudine Barretto as Jenny
- Piolo Pascual as Lino

=== Supporting cast ===
- Iza Calzado as Mary Grace
- Ilonah Jean as Vangie
- Ryan Eigenmann as Perry
- Lotlot de Leon as Ruth
- Pia Moran as Baby
- Cecil Paz as Attorney
- At Maculangan as Jomar
- Ward Luarca as Kuya Ward
- Lollie Mara as Ate Connie
- Irma Adlawan as Mary Grace's aunt
- Maritess Joaquin as Mary Grace's mother
- Cathy Garcia-Molina as Pinoy OFW worker (cameo)

== Production ==
Shootings for the film were primarily done in Milan and other Italian cities, such as Venice, where there are sizable Filipino communities. Star Cinema producer Malou N. Santos was behind the idea of making Milan the primary setting of the film because the base of ABS-CBN's The Filipino Channel in Europe is in the city. Director Olivia Lamasan requested that the film studio ensure that the budget for the film would not be lower than ₱30 million so that her film's quality would not be compromised. She expressed that she could not make the film before Star Cinema responded to the request. Lamasan described her film as a "labor of love" and said that in her stay in Italy for a month, the whole production team including the actors and actresses had to do other tasks such as in preparing the props when not in scene.

== Release ==
The film premiered on February 11, 2004 (two weeks before the premiere of the primetime fantaserye Marina). In April 2004, the film was released in VHS, VCD, and DVD. The VCD and DVD versions include bonus features and scenes from the film.

In 2015, ABS-CBN Film Restoration Project restored the film and released a digitally remastered version of the film on iTunes.

== Soundtrack ==
The theme song of the movie The Gift was performed by Piolo Pascual (cover version of Jim Brickman with the same title of the song).

== Reception ==
=== Box office ===
The film grossed a total of ₱135.88 million against its estimated ₱30 million budget.

=== Critical response ===
The film received widespread critical acclaim from critics upon its release. Nestor Torre, writing from Philippine Daily Inquirer, stated, "Olivia Lamasan's Milan is a unique viewing experience because it combined drama, romance, and social commentary. This ambitious combination makes the film a should-see in our book." Mario Bautista, writing from People's Journal said in his review "The two lead characters are truly well-defined, so we get to really care for them" Rina Jimenez-David, also writing for Philippine Daily Inquirer, stated "Isn't it a good thing that it is our artists, the filmmakers of Milan, who persist in drawing our attention to the hidden costs of labor export, not the lease of which is the heartbreak of exile and alienation?"

=== Accolades ===
Award	Category	Winner/Nominee	Result
FAMAS Award	Best Actor	Piolo Pascual	Won
FAMAS Award	Best Actress	Claudine Barretto	Won
FAMAS Award	Best Picture	Milan	Nominated
FAP Awards	Best Actress	Claudine Barretto	Won
FAP Awards	Best Actor	Piolo Pascual	Nominated
FAP Awards	Best Cinematography	Shayne Clemente	Nominated
FAP Awards	Best Director	Olivia M. Lamasan	Nominated
FAP Awards	Best Editing	Marya Ignacio	Nominated
FAP Awards	Best Picture	Milan	Nominated
FAP Awards	Best Production Design	Nuel C. Naval	Nominated
FAP Awards	Best Supporting Actor	Ryan Eigenmann	Nominated
Gawad Urian Award	Best Editing	Marya Ignacio	Won
Gawad Urian Award	Best Actor	Piolo Pascual	Nominated
Gawad Urian Award	Best Actress	Claudine Barretto	Nominated
Gawad Urian Award	Best Cinematography	Shayne Clemente	Nominated
Gawad Urian Award	Best Direction	Olivia M. Lamasan	Nominated
Gawad Urian Award	Best Film	Milan	Nominated
Gawad Urian Award	Best Screenplay	Raymond Lee; Olivia M. Lamasan	Nominated
Golden Screen Awards	Breakthrough Performance by an Actress	Iza Calzado	Won
