= Claudine (TV program) =

2010 Philippine television drama series

- Title card
- Genre: Drama
- Written by: Aloy Adlawan
- Creative director: Jun Lana
- Starring: Claudine Barretto
- Country of origin: Philippines
- Original language: Tagalog
- No. of episodes: 18

Production
- Executive producer: Angie C. Castrence
- Production locations: Metro Manila, Philippines
- Camera setup: Multiple-camera setup
- Running time: 33–51 minutes
- Production company: GMA Entertainment TV

Original release
- Network: GMA Network
- Release: April 10 – August 7, 2010

Claudine is a 2010 Philippine television drama anthology series broadcast by GMA Network. Starring Claudine Barretto, it premiered on April 10, 2010. The series concluded on August 7, 2010, with a total of 18 episodes.

The show is streaming online on YouTube.

== Ratings ==
According to AGB Nielsen Philippines' Mega Manila household television ratings, the pilot episode of Claudine earned a 16.6% rating. The final episode scored a 9.2% rating in Mega Manila People/Individual television ratings.
