= Ouija (2007 film) =

- Theatrical release poster
- Directed by: Topel Lee
- Written by: Aloy Adlawan
- Produced by: Jose Mari Abacan; Vincent Del Rosario; Veronique Del Rosario
- Starring: Judy Ann Santos; Jolina Magdangal; Iza Calzado; Rhian Ramos; Desiree Del Valle
- Cinematography: Neil Daza
- Edited by: Marya Ignacio
- Music by: Carmina Robles Cuya
- Production companies: GMA Films; VIVA Films
- Distributed by: Viva Films
- Release date: July 25, 2007
- Running time: 95 minutes
- Country: Philippines
- Language: Filipino
- Box office: ₱120.6 million

Ouija is a 2007 Filipino supernatural horror film directed by Topel Lee, and screenplay by Aloy Adlawan. It is Topel Lee's first feature-length horror film. The film stars Jolina Magdangal, Iza Calzado, Rhian Ramos, and Judy Ann Santos with Desiree del Valle.

== Plot ==
Half-sisters Aileen and Romina, along with first cousins Sandra and Ruth, reunite in Camiguin to bury their grandmother. Accompanied by Sandra's friend, Lucy, the girls dare to call on the spirits of the dead when they find their old Ouija board from when they were kids. The Ouija board is burned by accident before they are able to finish the ritual, trapping a murderous entity around them. As they begin to realize the terror that they have brought upon themselves, Aileen and Romina's hostile relationship becomes even more strained, while Lucy's sanity brings a heavy burden on Sandra, and Ruth's nanny and boyfriend, Gino, is unknowingly pulled into the danger and horror that awaits all of them. Aileen, a criminal advocate, accidentally kills a rape victim who was also haunted.

Confronted by imminent death, the girls have nowhere to go unless they can identify the spirit and find out where it is buried. It is only by leading the spirit to its burial ground that they will be able to release the spirit from the Ouija board and survive its fatal hauntings.

Using the Ouija board, the girls find that the ghost of a girl named Magda the Snake (she is called “The Snake” because she had the skin of snake at birth) is haunting them. They find Magda's corpse from under the sea and frees her spirit with the help of a priest. Magda was murdered by her envious twin sister Melda, because their parents loved Magda more. At the end it is revealed that it was Melda's spirit who haunted the girls and Magda's spirit was trying to protect them. Since they freed Magda's spirit, there is no one to protect them from Melda. At the end of the movie, Melda kills every girl.

== Cast ==
=== Main ===
- Jolina Magdangal as Romina
- Iza Calzado as Sandra
- Rhian Ramos as Ruth
- Judy Ann Santos as Aileen

=== Supporting ===
- Desiree del Valle as Lucy
- Ruby Rodriguez as Yaya
- JC de Vera as Gino
- Valerie Concepcion as Raped Victim
- Perla Bautista as Lagring
- Anita Linda as Lola Corazon
- Jackie Lou Blanco as Raquel
- Angelo Ilagan as Nilo
- Nanding Josef as Ka Mario
- JC Cuadrano as Doctor
- Illonah Villanueva as Magda
- Jean Villanueva as Melda

=== Special guests ===
- Pinky Amador as Ralvenia
- Chris Rawson as Dante
- Shamaine Centenera-Buencamino as Elvyra
- Eva Darren as Avantra
- Dianne Hernandez as Cielo
- Ehra Madrigal as Helena
- Vangie Labalan as Francisco
- Pauleen Luna as Carbonel
- Ashley Cabrera as Erron
- Jim Pebangco as Jacinta
- Ryan Agoncillo as Flight Attendant

== Reception ==
The movie is graded A by the Cinema Evaluation Board (CEB) of the Philippines. An A rating gives the film a 100% tax rebate on its earnings.

=== Awards and nominations ===
26th FAP (LUNA) Awards (2008)

- Best Editing - Marya Ignacio
- Best Musical Score - Carmina Robles (won)
- Best Sound - Ditoy Aguila (won)

10th PASADO Awards (2008)

- Best Actress - Judy Ann Santos (won)
- Best Original Screenplay - Aloy Adlawan (won)
- Best Sound - Ditoy Aguila (won)

24th PMPC Awards for Movies (2008)

- Movie of the Year - GMA Films
- Movie Director of the Year - Topel Lee
- Movie Supporting Actress of the Year - Iza Calzado
- New Movie Actress of the Year - Rhian Ramos
- Movie Original Screenplay of the Year - Aloy Adlawan
- Movie Cinematographer of the Year - Neil Daza
- Movie Editor of the Year - Marya Ignacio
- Movie Production Designer of the Year - Mark Sabas
- Movie Musical Scorer of the Year - Carmina Robles Cuya
- Movie Sound Engineer of the Year - Ditoy Aguila and Rudy Gonzales (won)

5th Golden Screen Awards (2008)

- Breakthrough Performance by an Actress - Rhian Ramos (won)
- Best Visual Effects - Ignite Media

=== International screenings ===
The movie would have been the first GMA Films movie to have international screenings and the second Viva movie to have international screenings. The scheduled overseas premieres in four U.S. cities (Las Vegas, San Francisco, Los Angeles, and San Diego) were cancelled. Only the one in New Jersey pushed through. The movie is titled Seance internationally.

== Home video release ==
GMA Records Home Video (distributed under license by Viva Video, Inc.) released Ouija now available on DVD and VCD format on September 12, 2007.

== See also ==
- List of ghost films
