= Ador =

Ador may refer to:

== People ==
- Ador Gjuci (born 1998), Italian-born Albanian football player
- Ador (surname)
  - Galo Ador Jr. (1969–2008), Filipino comic book author
  - Gustave Ador (1845–1928), Swiss politician

== Places ==
- Ador, Spain

== Other ==
- ADOR, a South Korean music label owned by Hybe Corporation
- A.D.O.R.
- Ador Group
- Ador Welding

== See also ==
- Adore (disambiguation)
