= Athena Tibi =

Japan-based singer from the Philippines

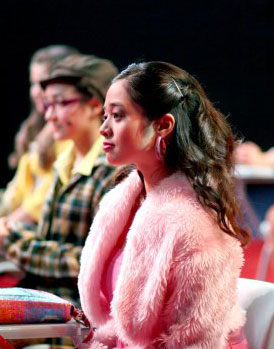
- Athena appears on stage as Sharpay Evans in High School Musical

Background information
- Born: Athena Sophia Rhossa Alejandro Tibi; December 2, 1988 (age 37); Manila, Philippines
- Origin: Saitama, Japan
- Genres: J-pop, pop, pop rock, R&B
- Occupations: Singer, actress
- Instrument: Vocals
- Years active: 2002–present
- Label: Viva Entertainment (2002 – 2006 / 2011)
- Website: SomethingDrastic Management

Athena (アシーナ, Ashīna; born December 2, 1988) or Athena Tibi is a Filipino singer, YouTuber, stage actress and movie actress from Manila, Philippines and raised in Saitama, Japan.

She is best known for her role as Kristine Santos in the 2009 film A Journey Home by Paul Soriano and as Reena San Jose in the 4th Wall Theater Company production of Rivalry, by Jaime Del Mundo and Ed Gatchalian, based on the Ateneo–La Salle rivalry between two universities in the Philippines. She announced her debut live show in Japan on November 18, 2012.

She now has a YouTube channel called "Japan with Athena" where she posts travel and life in Japan videos.

== Biography ==
=== Background ===
Athena was born in Manila, Philippines, but moved to Japan at age 3 when her family relocated due to her father's work. She grew up in Koshigaya in Saitama, then returned to Manila age 10, having mastered Japanese alongside English and Tagalog.

She went to High School at St. Paul College Pasig before moving to La Consolacion College in Pasig.

She graduated with a BA in Management from the University of Asia and the Pacific, a private research University located in Ortigas Center in Metro Manila in 2009.

=== Acting career ===
Athena's first acting role came in daily TV series Sarah the Teen Princess as recurring character Tiny, a friend of the lead character played by Sarah Geronimo in 2004 on ABS-CBN.

Athena next appeared as Cristy in 2004's Lastikman by director Mac Alejandre, based on the character created by Mars Ravelo. The story tells how the rubber-tree powered superhero (played by Mark Bautista) fights back against bullying and captures the heart of Lara (Sarah Geronimo), the girl he loves.

In 2006, Athena played Princess Gabrielle in a production of Gabrielle by Joachim Emilio Antonio, which won the second prize for a One-Act Play at the Palanca Awards, awarded for literary achievements since 1950.

During 2007, Athena starred in a series of plays and musicals, including Oscar Wilde's play The Importance of Being Earnest as Cecily Cardew, The Girl Who Was Plugged In as P.Burke and High School Musical Onstage as Sharpay Evans, alongside actor Sam Concepcion.

Athena's next project was as the lead in Jerry Bach's romantic comedy Pizza Girl, premiering in June 2008.

In 2009, Athena appeared alongside Joem Bascon and Toni Gonzaga in Paul Soriano's A Journey Home, described as "an inspirational indie movie with central themes of forgiveness, family solidarity and the upholding of moral values." Athena played Kristine, one of two children reunited with their estranged father after their mother's death, who is the more accommodating to her father's return to rebuild relationships. The premiere was held at the SM Megamall in Ortigas Center on October 3, 2009.

Back on stage, Athena played Sally Brown in Kultura and UA&P's production of You're a Good Man, Charlie Brown at the Insular Life Auditorium in Ayala Alabang in January and February 2010.

In 2011, Athena was one of the VJs of the show "The Daily Top 5" on Viva TV, alongside Nikki Bacolod, Barbie Salvador, and other Viva Entertainment artists.

In 2012, Athena played Reena San Jose in the 4th Wall Theater Company production of Rivalry, based on the Ateneo–La Salle rivalry between two universities in the Philippines, which opened to unanimously positive reviews such as by The Philippine Star; "Filipinos are naturally gifted singers, particularly, the lead female protagonist whose vocal timbre reminded me of a younger Lea Salonga." Set in 1968, the story follows the tensions as the Ateneo Blue Eagles and the La Salle Green Archers prepare to meet in a basketball final, Athena's character described as "a beautiful Maryknoller named Reena San Jose, who, after enduring heartbreak, promises herself that she’ll never get involved with another guy again."

=== Music career ===
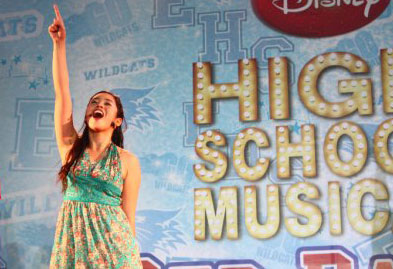
Athena appears as Gabrielle Montez on the High School Musical tour, 2007

Athena appeared on the Viva Television show Star for a Night broadcast on IBC, as a semi-finalist. Presented by renowned singer and actress Regine Velasquez, and eventually won by Sarah Geronimo, Athena sang Celine Dion's That's the Way It Is. Athena was then spotted and signed to Viva Entertainment, based in Quezon City in 2002.

Athena debuted as an artist as one part of three-piece unit 3Yo in December 2002, with Ketchup Song. 3Yo's self-titled debut album was released on December 3, 2004.

In 2004, Athena was a guest on MTV's MTV Lokal, hosted by KC Montero, where she represented Levi Music Festival, singing an original song "OK" written by Adrienne Sarmiento and renowned Filipino drummer Nino Regalado. The song was then included on an album release titled 1st Levi Music Festival.

In April 2005, Athena joined 4-member unit Fairgame, releasing one 4-track self-titled CD. Fairgame promoted in malls across The Philippines as an opening act for various Viva Entertainment artists.

Athena performed her first solo show at UA&P on September 13, 2007 at an event called 'Hanging Out with Athena Tibi', performing a range of pop, R&B, rock and acoustic songs.

On August 9, 2008, Athena joined Sam Concepcion, Cheska Ortega, Enrique Gil and Nelsito Gomez to sing the opening and closing song for the launch program of TV channel TV5.

Athena's own YouTube channel includes her renditions of songs by popular J-Pop singers such as Yui and Yuna Ito. In October 2012, she announced her debut solo live performance in Japan on November 18, 2012, at Shibuya Lounge Neo in Tokyo. She also submitted demo CDs to major Japanese labels such as Pony Canyon and Sony Music Japan.

== Filmography ==
=== Feature films and television ===
Year	Films	Characters
2004	Sarah the Teen Princess	Tiny (recurring cast)
2004	Lastikman	Christy
2008	Pizza Girl	Beth
2009	A Journey Home	Kristine Santos
2011	Kuya Alvin	Lani

=== Television appearances ===
Year	Programs	Characters
2003	Master Showman	Herself/Guest
2006	ASAP	Herself/High School Musical cast
2007	ASAP	Herself/High School Musical cast
2007	SOP (Philippine TV series)	Herself/High School Musical cast
2007	Shall We Dance?	Herself/High School Musical cast
2007–2008	The Sweet Life	Herself/Special Guest
2009	ASAP	Herself/N.O.A.H. cast
2011	The Daily Top 5	Herself/VJ

=== Theater ===
Year	Production Title	Characters
2004	Honk!	Ugly
2005	Pendragon	Morgan Le Fay
2006	Wicked	Elphaba Thropp
2006	New Yorker in Tondo	Kikay/Francesca
2006	Gabrielle	Princess Gabrielle
2007	The Importance of Being Earnest	Cecily Cardew
2007	The Girl Who Was Plugged In	P.Burke
2007	High School Musical Onstage	Sharpay Evans
2008	Much Ado About Nothing	Hero
2008	Sierra Lakes	Arlene Reyes
2009	You're a Good Man, Charlie Brown	Sally Brown
2009	Legally Blonde	Vivienne Kensington
2009	N.O.A.H. – No Ordinary Aquatic Habitat	Ensemble
2010	You're a Good Man, Charlie Brown	Sally Brown
2011	Hercules' 12	Athena/Artemis
2012–2014	Rivalry: Ateneo-La Salle the Musical	Reena San Jose
2015	Singapura	Farida

== Discography ==
=== 3YO ===
- 3YO – Ketchup Song (2003)
- Viva Popstars Christmas album (2003)
- 3YO (2004)
- Levi Celerio Music Festival (2004)

=== Fairgame ===
- Fairgame (2006)

=== Athena ===
- Athena (2012) – Available on Spotify
