= Lastikman (TV series) =

Philippine superhero television series

- Title card
- Genre: Superhero; Fantasy; Action drama Comedy
- Created by: Mars Ravelo†
- Based on: Lastikman by Mars Ravelo
- Developed by: ABS-CBN Studios
- Written by: Galo Ador, Jr.†; Reggie Amigo
- Directed by: Chito S. Roño; Jerome Pobocan; Tots Sanchez-Mariscal
- Starring: Vhong Navarro; Iya Villania
- Opening theme: "Lastikman" by Parokya ni Edgar
- Country of origin: Philippines
- Original language: Filipino
- No. of seasons: 1
- No. of episodes: 89

Production
- Executive producers: Roldeo T. Endrinal; Darnel Joy R. Villaflor; Julie Anne R. Benitez
- Editors: John Ryan Bonifacio; Omar Cervantes; Rommel Malimban; Michael Marinas; Aries Pascual; Dennis A. Salgado
- Running time: 25-30 minutes
- Production companies: Dreamscape Entertainment Television; Mars Ravelo Komiks Characters Inc.

Original release
- Network: ABS-CBN
- Release: September 24, 2007 – January 25, 2008

Mars Ravelo's Lastikman is a Philippine television drama fantasy series broadcast by ABS-CBN. The series is based on Mars Ravelo's comic book character of the same title. Directed by Chito S. Roño, Jerome Pobocan and Tots Sanchez-Mariscal, it stars Vhong Navarro and Iya Villania. It aired on the network's Primetime Bida line up and worldwide on TFC from September 24, 2007, to January 25, 2008, replacing Margarita and was replaced by Kung Fu Kids.

Lastikman received the highest average rating (36.4%) for a Philippine television series in 2008 according to NUTAM.

== Plot ==
=== Prologue: The Adventure Begins ===
Amon Labao, the matriarch of the planet Igbao in the galaxy Harraio, orders her subjects to conduct extensive experiments upon humans, their first being the abducted Ruth Abelgas. However, one scientist, Irroian, aids in her escape, and the pair fall in love, leading to Ruth giving birth to Eskappar.

When the Council determines that Ruth must be executed, Irroian seeks the help of his friend Agaddon in returning her to Earth, but a Council spy named Maraam learns that Ruth is with Irroian and arrests him. Meanwhile, Agaddon escapes with Ruth to Earth, and is determined by the council to be the "actual" traitor.

Once released, Irroian continues to raise Eskappar in Harraio, but because Eskappar assumes human form, Irroian eventually attempts to escape with him to Earth for fear for his son's life. Irroian is shot by Maraam's guards during the attempt, but he manages to send Eskappar to Earth with Butao, a robot containing a recording of Irroian with instructions for Eskappar to search for Ruth.

After Eskappar lands on Earth, he sees a man, Caloy, and follows him. However, when Caloy falls into a surging river, Eskappar uses his elasticity to save Caloy's life. Caloy eventually assumes that Eskappar is a lost foreigner, and takes him home, where he names him "Miguel" and raises him. Several years later, Miguel witnesses the death of his foster father, and decides to become Lastikman.

=== Chapter 1: Mothra ===
Susan Navarro, an ex-beauty queen and interior decorator, is kidnapped by Agaddon and transformed into "Mothra," a moth-like monster that spreads respiratory illnesses and manipulates men. She later appears in a park, where she infects passersby and kills them. A photographer named Albert chances upon the scene and is left alive by Mothra to spread the story of the virus outbreak. Later that evening, Susan's mother recognizes her as Mothra from a photograph in a newspaper and wonders if this is a punishment for her relationship with Danny. At the same time, Evilone Pharmaceutical offers to find a cure for Mothra's victims.

Meanwhile, Miguel is depressed because Yellena is planning to reconcile with Ken. He avoids his friends and takes a day off to take his mind off Yellena. When his friends check on him that evening, Miguel announces that he wants to drop out of school. However, his friends dissuade him from his rash decision. The next day, Miguel returns to school and is again attracted to Yellena. Though Yellena is still intent on reconciling with Ken, he is busy practicing sports, and Miguel sees the situation as an opportunity to be close to Yellena by consoling her.

=== Chapter 2: Beautiki/Byutiki ===
Ines Samantela, a teacher at POPU college, is found by Agaddon and voluntarily transformed into "Beautiki (Byutiki)", a lizard-like creature that can use acid to melt her victims away. She uses her new-found power to destroy those who she believed had hurt her, including one of her relatives.

=== Chapter 3: Alingasaw ===
A paparazzo named Albert Langitan is tasked to tail Lastikman and secretly photograph him. However, he is found by Agaddon and transformed into "Alingasaw", manipulator of insects and worms.

=== Chapter 4: Morphino ===
Mang Ninoy, a sari-sari store owner in Bgy. Bagong Unlad, is found by Agaddon and talked into being transformed into "Morphino". He can transform to resemble others, and uses this ability to impersonate and discredit Lastikman.

=== Chapter 5: Lagablab ===
Ryan White, Yellena's older brother, was angry at Miguel, blaming him for her death and his mother Ayessa's stroke. Jared convinced him to turn into "Lagablab", controller of fire. Jared had also turned the rest of the Foremen into Ryan's minions to destroy Lastikman. Still, Lastikman managed to defeat the Foremen. Infuriated, Jared had other plans in mind in order to acquire his ultimate soldier.

=== Chapter 6: Frosta ===
After witnessing the murder of her son Ryan in Lastikman's hands, the half-dead Ayessa White allowed herself to be under Jared's command. Jared turns her into a manipulator of ice and heals her paralysis. She calls herself "Frosta".

=== Chapter 7: Elemento ===
Because his stone, Liwata, was completed, Jared Evilone was able to use it to unlock the powers of fire, wind, earth, and water. He turns into "Elemento", master of the elements, in order to battle Lastikman for Ruth's attention and love as well as to finish his empire's completion.

He was weakened upon the removal of his completed stone, Liwata, but as he was left for dead, Toto listened to his instructions and brought about Elemento's final transformation.

== Cast and characters ==
The Lastikman Cast.

=== Main cast ===
- Vhong Navarro as Eskappar/Miguel "Migz" Asis/Lastikman: a half-human, half-alien superhero who possesses the ability to stretch and distort his body, and takes his alias from the word "elastic". Coming from the extragalactic planet Igbao, he was originally named "Eskappar" by his parents, and was given the name Miguel when he came to Earth. Lastikman spends much of the series fighting against monsters created by Agaddon while searching for his mother, Ruth.

=== Supporting cast ===
- Gloria Romero as Amon Labao: the leader in Harraio Galaxy
- Iya Villania as Yellena White: Miguel's best friend and love interest
- Cherie Gil as Ayessa White/Frosta: Yellena's mother
- Dawn Zulueta as Ruth Abelgas: an Earthling abducted to planet Igbao and Miguel/Eskappar's mother
- Zsa Zsa Padilla as Dra. Cynthia "Cindy" Evilone: Adoptive Mother of Sandy, the alter ego of Ruth
- Ian Veneracion as Agaddon: a Harrian scientist and Lastikman's nemesis
- John Estrada as Dr. Jared Evilone/Elemento: Adoptive father of Sandy, the alter ego of Agaddon
- Roxanne Guinoo as Cassandra "Sandy" Evilone: Jared and Cynthia's daughter
- Danilo Barrios as Ryan White/Lagablab: Yellena's older brother and Ayessa's son
- Jake Cuenca as Kenneth "Ken" Madrigal: the leader of the Foremen group
- Jomari Yllana as Mang Ninoy/Morphino: a sari-sari store owner in Brgy. Bagong Unlad
- Carmi Martin as Dolores Puntawe: Miguel's cruel and strict yet loving foster mother
- Tonton Gutierrez as Irroian: a Harrian scientist and Miguel/Eskappar's father
- Sunshine Cruz as Susan Navarro/Mothra: an ex-beauty queen and interior decorator

=== Extended cast ===
- Archie Alemania as Chikoy Gipit: Miguel's neighbor and good friend
- Empress Schuck as Madonna Puntawe: Dolores' daughter out of wedlock and Miguel's foster sister
- Jason Gainza as Carlos "Caloy" Asis: Miguel's foster father
- James Blanco as Albert Langitan/Alingasaw: a photographer tasked with taking photos of Lastikman
- Enchong Dee as Rafael "Raffy" Gipit: Chikoy's geeky younger brother and Madonna's love interest
- Daisy Cariño as Baby Gipit: Chikoy and Raffy's mother
- Saicy Aguila as Ines Samantela/Beautiki: a teacher at POPU college
- Jairus Aquino as Young Eskappar/Miguel
- Alex Cortez as Maaram

=== Guest cast ===
- Toni Gonzaga as Gemma Dela Rosa - TV News Reporter
- Issa Pressman (credited as Louissa Pressman) as young Yellena
- Niña Dolino as Prof Jane Villamor
- Jacob Dionisio as young Chikoy
- Sophia Baars as young Sandy
- Andrew Muhlach as young Ryan
- Carlo Lacana as young Ken
- Paulo Sadist as Reden
- Claire Vanessa Lim as Kim An Yoong
- CJ Jaravata as Eva
- Peewee O'Hara as Aling Mathod
- Gilette Sandico as Judith
- Georgia Ortega as Choleng
- Basty Alcanses as Cyruss
- Eva Darren as Susan's mother
- Marvin Raymundo as Don
- Jordan Castillo as Toto: Agaddon/Jared Evilone's trusted assistant
- Nonie Buencamino as Danny
- Paolo Ramirez as Jerson
- Niña Dolino as Jane
- Kimberly Diaz as Susana

== Production ==
=== Lastikman OST ===
The main theme song is called "Lastikman". It is performed by Parokya ni Edgar and can be found on their album, Solid. The love theme is called "Maging Anupaman Para Sa'yo" (I'll Be Anything For You) performed by Martin Nievera for Miguel & Yellena (Vhong & Iya).

=== Primer ===
A primer was made entitled, Lastikmania: The Making of Lastikman. It was aired on September 22, 2007. It was hosted by Piolo Pascual, Bea Alonzo, Anne Curtis, and John Lloyd Cruz. ABS-CBN also made a teaser program entitled, Lastikminutes. It showed how Lastikman was created and conceptualized. It was aired a week before the show kicked off on Primetime Bida.

=== Development ===
This show is the first Dreamscape Entertainment due to fantasy and action. This series has been succeeded by Kung Fu Kids in 2008.

== Reception ==
Lastikman debuted with 30.3% according to AGB Nielsen in Mega Manila. The highest ratings it garnered was 30.9%, while the lowest was the New Year's Eve episode, which only got 15.1%. The final episode garnered a 41.4% Nationwide rating.

Lastikman will be also part of Komiks Presents: Isang Lakas. Together with Mars Ravelo's different comic characters, like Kapitan Boom, Varga, Tiny Tony, Dragonna and Flash Bomba.

== Reruns ==
The show began airing re-runs on Jeepney TV from January 14 to March 15, 2019; May 16 to July 15, 2022; July 3 to October 27, 2023; December 14, 2024 to July 5, 2025 and September 26, 2026 to April 3, 2027.

It also aired re-runs on Kapamilya Channel from June 30 to October 27, 2023 and on CineMo! from April 20 to August 31, 2026.

== Awards ==
The said TV series won Silver World Medal (Action/ Adventure category) from the prestigious 2009 New York Festivals.

== See also ==
- List of programs broadcast by ABS-CBN
- List of ABS-CBN Studios original drama series
- List of programs broadcast by Jeepney TV
- Lastikman
- Lastikman: Unang Banat
- Lastikman (2003 film)
