= 2004 Metro Manila Film Festival =

Film festival edition

- Date: December 25, 2004 to January 5, 2005
- Site: Manila

Highlights
- Best Picture: Mano Po III: My Love
- Most awards: Mano Po III: My Love & Panaghoy sa Suba (7)

Television coverage
- Network: RPN

The 30th Metro Manila Film Festival was held in Manila, Philippines, from December 25, 2004, to January 5, 2005.

Vilma Santos, Christopher de Leon and their movie, Mano Po III: My Love topped the 2004 Metro Manila Film Festival. Santos and de Leon won the Best Actress and Best Actor awards respectively for their roles in Mano Po III: My Love, which was also awarded the Festival's Best Picture. The Best Supporting Actor and Actress awards went to Dennis Trillo for Aishite Imasu 1941: Mahal Kita and Rebecca Lusterio for Panaghoy sa Suba.

Cesar Montano's Panaghoy sa Suba also received six other awards including the prestigious Gatpuno Antonio J. Villegas Cultural Awards, Best Director for Montano, and the Second Best Picture among others.

== Entries ==
Title	Starring	Studio	Director	Genre
Aishite Imasu 1941: Mahal Kita	Judy Ann Santos, Raymart Santiago, Jay Manalo, Dennis Trillo, Anita Linda, Ms. Jaclyn Jose, Angelu de Leon, TJ Trinidad, Iya Villania, Marco Alcaraz, Yasmien Kurdi	BAS Films	Joel Lamangan	Drama, Romance, War
Enteng Kabisote: Okay ka, Fairy Ko: The Legend	Vic Sotto, Kristine Hermosa, Michael V., G. Toengi, Jeffrey Quizon, Aiza Seguerra, Bing Loyzaga, Nadine Samonte, Oyo Boy Sotto, January Isaac, Dick Israel, Ruby Rodriguez, Jose Manalo, Wally Bayola, Leila Kuzma	Octoarts Films and M-Zet Productions	Tony Y. Reyes	Action, Adventure, Comedy, Fantasy
Lastikman: Unang Banat	Mark Bautista, Sarah Geronimo, John Estrada, Danilo Barrios, Elizabeth Oropesa, Joel Torre, Mark Gil, Bearwin Meily, Tuesday Vargas, Mikel Campos, Cherie Gil	VIVA Films	Mac Alejandre	Action, Comedy, Fantasy, Superhero
Mano Po III: My Love	Vilma Santos, Christopher de Leon, Sheryl Cruz, Jay Manalo, Eddie Garcia, Patrick Garcia, Angel Locsin, Angelica Panganiban, John Prats, Carlo Aquino, Boots Anson-Roa, Jean Garcia, Karylle, Dennis Trillo	MAQ Productions	Joel Lamangan	Drama, Romance
Panaghoy sa Suba	Cesar Montano, Juliana Palermo, Jacky Woo, Caridad Sanchez, Joel Torre, Ronnie Lazaro, Daria Ramirez, Rommel Montano, Phil Anthony, Suzette Ranillo, Rebecca Lusterio	CM Films	Cesar Montano	Romance, Drama, War
Sigaw	Richard Gutierrez, Angel Locsin, Jomari Yllana, James Blanco, Iza Calzado, Ronnie Lazaro, Ella Guevara	Regal Films and Megavision Films	Yam Laranas	Horror, Thriller
So Happy Together	Kris Aquino, Eric Quizon, Tonton Gutierrez, Nova Villa, Cogie Domingo, Gloria Diaz, Jennylyn Mercado, Mark Herras, Yasmien Kurdi, Rainier Castillo, Jay-R	Regal Films	Joel Lamangan	Comedy, Drama, Romance
Spirit of the Glass	Rica Peralejo, Marvin Agustin, Dingdong Dantes, Alessandra de Rossi, Paolo Contis, Ciara Sotto, Ana Capri, Mark Gil, Jay Aquitania, Jake Cuenca, Drew Arellano	OctoArts Films	Jose Javier Reyes	Fantasy, Horror, Romance

== Winners and nominees ==
=== Awards ===
Winners are listed first and highlighted in boldface.

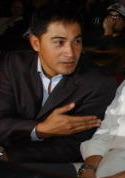
Cesar Montano, Best Director winner

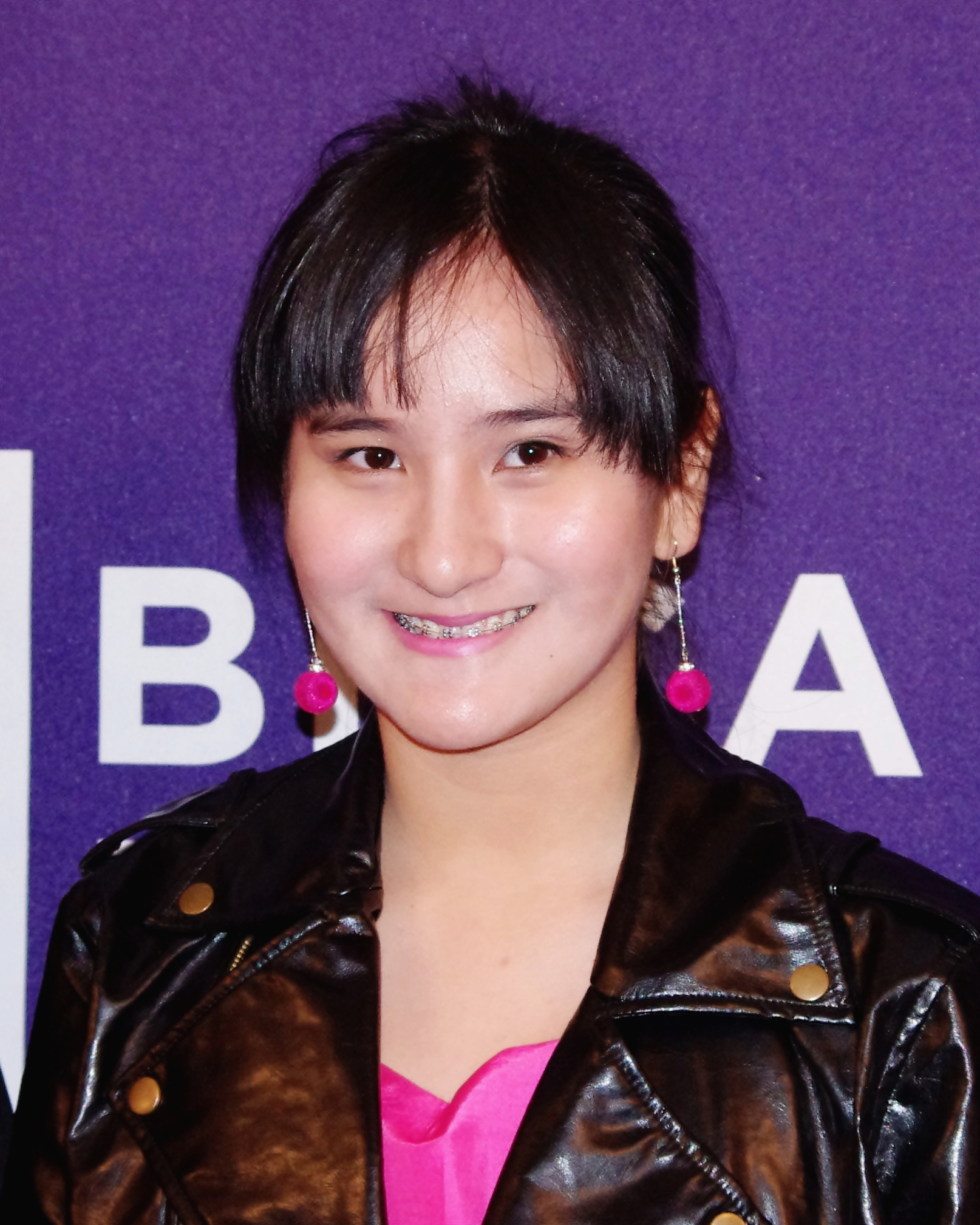
Ella Guevara, Best Child Performer winner

Best Picture	Best Director
**Mano Po III: My Love - MAQ Productions**; Panaghoy sa Suba - CM Films Inc. (2nd Best Picture); Aishite Imasu 1941: Mahal Kita - Regal Films (3rd Best Picture); So Happy Together - Regal Films; Sigaw - Regal Films; Spirit of the Glass - Octoarts Films; Lastikman: Unang Banat - VIVA Films; Enteng Kabisote: Okay ka, Fairy Ko: The Legend - Octoarts Films and M-Zet Productions	**Cesar Montano - Panaghoy sa Suba**
Best Actor	Best Actress
**Christopher de Leon – Mano Po III: My Love**; Raymart Santiago - Aishite Imasu 1941: Mahal Kita	**Vilma Santos – Mano Po III: My Love**; Judy Ann Santos - Aishite Imasu 1941: Mahal Kita
Best Supporting Actor	Best Supporting Actress
**Dennis Trillo - Aishite Imasu 1941: Mahal Kita**	**Rebecca Lusterio - Panaghoy sa Suba**
Best Cinematography	Best Production Design
**Ely Cruz - Panaghoy sa Suba**	**Rodell Cruz - Mano Po III: My Love**
Best Child Performer	Best Editing
**Ella Guevara - Sigaw**	**Manet Dayrit - Sigaw**
Best Original Story	Best Screenplay
**Joel Lamangan, Roy Iglesias & Lily Monteverde - Mano Po III: My Love**	**Cris Vertido - Panaghoy sa Suba**
Best Original Theme Song	Best Musical Score
**"Pagbigyan ang Puso Ko" from Mano Po III: My Love - Karylle and Jerome John Hughes**	**Nonong Buencamino - Panaghoy sa Suba**
Best Visual Effects	Best Make-up Artist
**Fel Rodolfo - Lastikman: Unang Banat**	**Alex Vicencio - Enteng Kabisote: Okay ka, Fairy Ko: The Legend**
Best Sound Recording	Best Float
**Albert Michael Idioma & Arnold Reodica - Sigaw**	**Mano Po III: My Love - MAQ Productions**
Most Gender-Sensitive Film
**Aishite Imasu 1941: Mahal Kita - Regal Films**
Gatpuno Antonio J. Villegas Cultural Awards
**Panaghoy sa Suba - CM Films Inc.**

== Multiple awards ==
Awards	Film
7	Mano Po III: My Love
7	Panaghoy sa Suba
3	Aishite Imasu 1941: Mahal Kita
3	Sigaw

== Box Office gross ==
Entry	Gross Ticket Sales					
Entry	December 25	December 29	January 1	January 2	January 4	January 5
Enteng Kabisote: Okay ka, Fairy Ko: The Legend	₱ 11,800,000*	₱ 62,800,000*	₱ 83,600,000*	₱ 93,000,000*	₱ 99,300,000*	₱ 101,600,000*
So Happy Together	₱ 5,500,000	₱ 23,000,000	₱ 32,100,000	₱ 37,000,000	₱ 42,600,000	₱ 45,100,000
Spirit of the Glass	₱ 7,000,000	₱ 23,200,000	₱ 30,900,000	₱ 34,000,000	₱ 37,800,000	₱ 39,300,000
Mano Po III: My Love	₱ 3,800,000	₱ 19,000,000	₱ 27,500,000	₱ 30,000,000	₱ 33,800,000	₱ 35,300,000
Sigaw	₱ 3,700,000	₱ 14,200,000	₱ 18,600,000	₱ 21,000,000	₱ 24,200,000	₱ 25,300,000
Lastikman: Unang Banat	₱ 4,100,000	₱ 16,000,000	₱ 21,100,000	₱ 22,000,000	₱ 24,000,000	₱ 24,500,000
Panaghoy sa Suba	₱ 2,060,000	₱ 7,500,000	₱ 10,900,000	₱ 12,000,000	₱ 14,800,000	₱ 15,800,000
Aishite Imasu 1941: Mahal Kita	₱ 2,080,000	₱ 7,300,000	₱ 10,100,000	₱ 11,000,000	₱ 13,000,000	₱ 13,700,000
					TOTAL	₱ 300,777,532.66

Preceded by 2003 Metro Manila Film Festival	Metro Manila Film Festival; 2004	Succeeded by 2005 Metro Manila Film Festival
