= Lastikman (2003 film) =

- Directed by: Tony Y. Reyes
- Written by: Tony Y. Reyes
- Based on: Lastikman by Mars Ravelo
- Produced by: Orly Ilacad; Marvic Sotto
- Starring: Vic Sotto
- Cinematography: Ely Cruz
- Edited by: Fiona Borres
- Music by: Elhmir T. Saison
- Production companies: M-ZET Productions; OctoArts Films
- Distributed by: OctoArts Films
- Release date: January 1, 2003
- Running time: 115 minutes
- Country: Philippines
- Language: Filipino
- Budget: ₱35 million (estimated)

Lastikman is a 2003 Filipino superhero film based on the comic book character Lastikman, written and directed by Tony Y. Reyes. It stars Vic Sotto, Donita Rose, Michael V., Jeffrey Quizon, Michelle Bayle, Anne Curtis, Oyo Boy Sotto, Ryan Eigenmann, Pocholo Montes, Elizabeth Oropesa, Lito Legaspi, Evangeline Pascual, and Joonee Gamboa.

Produced by Sotto's M-ZET TV Production, Lastikman is the second film adaptation of the character, nearly 38 years after the first adaptation, Lastik Man, was released in 1965. The film's special effects were by Tony Gapo Marbella, credited under "Special Effectsman", while its post-production was handled by RoadRunner Network.

The film was released through OctoArts Films on January 1, 2003, as part of the 28th Metro Manila Film Festival.

== Plot ==
Larry, a physics professor from Manila, is secretly the superhero Lastikman. He is a human mutant who has the ability to stretch and to shapeshift his body fantastically to great lengths and into any form he desires. He received his superpowers as a teenager when a meteorite crashed into a rubber-tree right over him. Years later he is a famous and popular superhero adored by the citizens of Manila and especially by his student Jepoy, whom he saves regularly from bullies.

When the violent bully Ryan is banned from the university after another attack, he is so enraged that he uses Jepoy's worship for Lastikman and lures him into a trap. Dressed up as Lastikman, he and his friends beat Jepoy almost dead. The injured Jepoy feels betrayed and turns insane. While the police believes Lastikman really beat up an innocent citizen and the media turns against him, Jepoy locks himself in his home-lab and uses some high-tech gadgets to turn into the supervillain Stryker. He also became furious when he heard of his parents' arrest after being implicated as leaders of a crime syndicate.

Jepoy, now Stryker, attacks the bully gang and tries to kill them. Lastikman interferes but in the chaos Jepoy's friend Donna is killed. Stryker blames Lastikman and the arriving police tries to arrest him. Lastikman is able to escape with his shapeshifting power and decides to stop his superhero-activities forever.

Stryker, still furious with Lastikman, runs havoc in Manila, blowing up buildings and bridges to lure him out. The media apologize to Lastikman and Larry decides, after talking with his grandfather (who is aware of his superhero alter ego from the first day) to fight him.

Lastikman faces Stryker and in the battle, which causes huge chaos across Manila, they realize each other's identity. The shocked Stryker falls into a power-unit and falls into a coma. Lastikman is rehabilitated and the city's hero again.

Several days later Larry meets his friend Linda in a resort and confesses that he loves her, despite her crush on Lastikman. When they kiss, Larry's mouth is stretched and Linda realizes that Larry and Lastikman are the same person, which makes her delighted.

== Cast ==
=== Main cast ===
- Vic Sotto as Lastikman / Larry
- Donita Rose as Linda
- Michael V. as Junie Lee / Reporter
- Jeffrey Quizon as Jepoy / Stryker

=== Supporting cast ===
- Michelle Bayle as Korina Santos
- Ryan Eigenmann as Ryan
- Raven Villanueva as Donna
- Wally Bayola as Wally
- Elizabeth Oropesa as Mrs. Orozco
- Pocholo Montes as Mr. Orozco
- Joonee Gamboa as Lolo Pablo

=== Special participation ===
- Oyo Boy Sotto as young Larry
- Anne Curtis as young Linda
- King Alcala as young Jepoy
- Jane Oineza as young Donna
- Joey de Leon as Elmer
- Evangeline Pascual as Larry's mother
- Lito Legaspi as Larry's father

=== Extended cast ===
- Steven Claude Goyong as Dondi
- Dindin Llarena as Mela
- Nelson Evangelista as Otan
- Jose Manalo as Jose
- Jopay Paguia as Jopay
- Minnie Aguilar as Lyme
- Maureen Mauricio as Patricia
- Eugene Domingo as Eva
- Wahoo Sotto as Wahoo
- Rudy Meyer as Gian
- Nonong Bangkay de Andres as Spanky
- Mike Gayoso as Erwin
- Mark Vergel as Tomas
- Gerald Ejercito as Nyoy
- Richard Merck as Richard
- Nanding Josef as Elvis
- Francis Pangilinan as Senator Kiko
- Val Sotto as Police Chief

== Production ==
=== Filming ===
The film was shot in Metro Manila, specifically in Quezon City; Manila Post Office, Manila Light Rail Transit System (LRT-1), Manila City Hall in Manila; and Star City in Pasay.

== Accolades ==
Year	Group	Category	Name	Result
2002	Metro Manila Film Festival	Best Picture	Lastikman	Won
2002	Metro Manila Film Festival	Best Actor	Vic Sotto	Won
2002	Metro Manila Film Festival	Best Actress	Donita Rose	Nominated

== See also ==
- Lastikman: Unang Banat
- Lastikman (TV series)
