= Mikel Campos =

Filipino actor

- Born: July 29, 1986 (age 39); Philippines
- Occupation: Actor; Real estate agent
- Years active: 2002-2017

Mikel Campos (born July 29, 1986) is a Filipino actor.

== Career ==
Campos made his acting debut, in 2002, when he joined the Viva Communications's teen drama Click Batch 3. He later trained in Mac Alejandre's acting workshop.

The following year, he appeared in the films Filipinas and Captain Barbell. He also joined Valerie Concepcion in Walang Hanggan.

In 2004; Campos was cast as one of the three leading men in Sarah the Teen Princess, after the abrupt withdrawal of Viva Artists Agency's talent pool from GMA Network.

Campos played the miserly Mike in the teen sitcom Let's Go! from 2005 to 2007.

In 2009, Campos appeared in adult comedy Maximus & Minimus and was awarded Best Actor in the Cinema One Originals Film Festival.

== Personal life ==
Campos is one of two sons of Susan Gaddi-Campos, a former ramp and commercial model, and business man Bunny Campos. He has an older brother named Richard.

During his adolescence, he was diagnosed with bipolar disorder, attention deficit hyperactivity disorder and dyslexia.

In 2020, Campos graduated Bachelor of Arts in Communications at Thames International School, Inc. in Quezon City, Currently, he is a real estate agent in Robinsons Land Corporation. He has a daughter Aera, born 2013, with Louise Arielle Guittap.

== Filmography ==
=== Television ===
Year	Title	Role	Notes	Source
2002–04	Click	Nathan		
2004	Sarah the Teen Princess	Cedrick		
2004	Wansapanataym	Toy Soldier	Episode: "Ang Wish Ko ay Sumapit"	
2005	Qpids	Himself – contestant		
2005–07	Let's Go!	Mikel "Mike" Campos		
2006	My Juan and Only			
2010	1DOL	Host	Episode: "Family Reunion"	
2011	Budoy	Pilipinas IQ Staff		
2017	Ipaglaban Mo!	Atty. Hernandez	Episode: "Taksil"	

=== Film ===
Year	Title	Role	Notes	Source
2003	Filipinas	Dylan		
2003	Captain Barbell	Mike		
2004	Lastikman: Unang Banat	Benjie		
2006	All About Love	JP		
2008	Ikaw Pa Rin: Bongga ka Boy	David	Credited as "Mikel Campus"	
2008	Baler	Flag bearer		
2009	Maximus & Minimus	Papu		

=== Theater ===
Year	Title	Role	Notes	Source
2010	Hamlet	Hamlet	Seventh Stage Production House	

== Awards and nominations ==
Year	Work	Organization	Category	Result	Source
2004	Filipinas	PMPC Star Awards for Movies	New Movie Actor of the Year	Nominated	
2008	Maximus & Minimus	Cinema One Originals Film Festival	Best Actor	Won	
