= Captain Barbell (2003 film) =

Filipino superhero film

- Directed by: Mac C. Alejandre
- Written by: RJ Nuevas
- Based on: Captain Barbell by Mars Ravelo
- Produced by: William Leary
- Starring: Ramon 'Bong' Revilla Jr.; Ogie Alcasid; Albert Martinez; Rufa Mae Quinto; Regine Velasquez; Snooky Serna; Jeffrey Quizon
- Cinematography: Romy Vitug
- Edited by: Danny Gloria
- Music by: Gerdie Francisco
- Production company: Premiere Entertainment Productions
- Distributed by: Viva Films
- Release date: December 25, 2003
- Running time: 110 minutes
- Country: Philippines
- Language: Filipino
- Box office: ₱62,064,626

Mars Ravelo's Captain Barbell, or simply Captain Barbell, is a 2003 Filipino superhero film directed by Mac C. Alejandre. Based on the Pinoy Komiks superhero of the same name, it stars Ramon 'Bong' Revilla Jr. in the title role. Produced by Premiere Entertainment Productions, the film was released by Viva Films as part of the 29th Metro Manila Film Festival on December 25, 2003, and was the highest-grossing film among the festival's nine entries. The film is streaming online on YouTube.

== Plot ==
Enteng is a gym assistant who finds a barbell that gives him superhuman abilities as Captain Barbell. The source of his powers is a meteor that disintegrated into several pieces and has granted powers to others who use it for evil.

The first of them is Utoy, a vagrant who transforms into a mutant called Dagampatay. He dissolves people with his spit and summons rats around him. After attempting to poison the La Mesa Reservoir, he is defeated by Captain Barbell when he boomerangs his spit back into himself.

The second villain is Roselle, a rape victim who was dumped near blocks of ice and gain freezing powers. She kills her rapist and goes on a killing spree of men she seduces before being frozen by Captain Barbell when he shields himself using her hands.

The main villain is Lagablab, a fire-breather at a circus who went on the run after killing his employer and getting struck by lightning, gaining pyrokinetic abilities. He is defeated by Captain Barbell when he sends him to outer space.

== Cast ==
- Ogie Alcasid and Ramon 'Bong' Revilla Jr. as Enteng / Captain Barbell
- Regine Velasquez as Cielo / Darna
- Albert Martinez as Arnaldo / Lagablab
- Rufa Mae Quinto as Roselle / Freezy
- Snooky Serna as Belen
- Jeffrey Quizon as Utoy / Dagampatay
- Antonio Aquitania as Efren
- Sarah Geronimo as Mara
- Emilio Garcia as Mr. Tan
- Carlo Maceda as Alvin
- Bearwin Meily as Lobo
- Goyong as Buyot
- Mel Kimura as Lilibeth
- Tuesday Vargas as Gang
- Vanna Garcia as snatcher victim
- John Apacible as Gus
- Mikel Campos as Mike
- PJ Malonzo as Lastikman
- Gloria Diaz as Cielo's mom

== Production ==
Rufa Mae Quinto was announced to be one of the villains in early October 2003. Actor Albert Martinez was hospitalized for a few days after accidentally swallowing kerosene during the filming of a fire-spitting scene, which he insisted on doing himself instead of his stunt double.

It is the final film produced by Premiere Entertainment Productions before shifting its focus as an investment holding company.

== Release ==
Captain Barbell was released by Viva Films on December 25, 2003, as an official entry to the 29th Metro Manila Film Festival. Despite the film's box office success, it did not win any awards.

=== Box office ===
Captain Barbell was the highest-grossing film among the nine entries of the MMFF, grossing a total of ₱62,064,626.
