= Lastikman =

Filipino comic book character

- Lastikman in 2004

Publication information
- Publisher: Mango Comics
- First appearance: Lastik Man Vol. 1 Aliwan Komiks #56 (December 7, 1964)
- Created by: Mars Ravelo

In-story information
- Alter ego: Hilario aka Larry (2003 movie); Adrian (2004 movie); Miguel (2007 TV series)
- Species: Harraian
- Place of origin: Igbao (Harraio Galaxy)
- Team affiliations: Captain Barbell; Darna; Dyesebel; Enteng Kabisote; Isang Lakas in some takes of the character
- Notable aliases: Lastik Man (later named as Lastikman)
- Abilities: Superhuman elasticity, flexibility, malleability and endurance; Able to stretch any part of his body; Shapeshifting; Resistance to physical attacks and electricity

Lastikman, originally spelled as Lastik Man, is a fictional character and Filipino comics superhero created by Mars Ravelo and artist Mar T. Santana. Lastikman or the original spelling of Lastik Man debuted in comics format in Aliwan Komiks #56 (December 7, 1964). Based on DC Comics' Plastic Man, and/or Marvel's Mister Fantastic from Fantastic Four, Lastikman can also stretch and transform into many imaginable forms and shapes he desires.

== History ==
=== 1964-1965 ===
In the 1965 comic book of Aliwan Komiks "Lastik Man Vol. 1", Lastik Man is introduced as a new comic book superhero, an alien from another planet who somehow got trapped on earth. Lastikman then decided to fight crime in the Philippines, mainly in Manila.

=== 1995-1997 ===
==== 1995 Issue #1 ====
In Issue #1: "Color of Death" (September 28, 1995).

1995 Issue #2

In Issue #2: "Lastikman vs Doomwarrior" (October 5, 1995).

==== 1995 Issue #3 ====
In Issue #3: "Playground" (October 12, 1995), Lastikman faces the mad toymaker Professor Gilmor.

==== 1995 Issue #4 ====
In Issue #4: "Gold" (October 19, 1995).

==== 1995 Issue #5 ====
In Issue #5: "Lastikman vs Taong Putik" (translated from Tagalog as Lastikman vs Mud Man) (October 26, 1995).

==== 1995 Issue #6 ====
In Issue #6: "Pyrona" (November 2, 1995).

==== 1995 Issue #7 ====
In Issue #7: "Earthquakes" (November 9, 1995).

==== 1995 Issue #8 ====
In Issue #8: "Creatura" (November 16, 1995).

==== 1995 Issue #10 ====
In Issue #10: "Dzuteh" (November 30, 1995).

==== 1995 Issue #11 ====
In Issue #11: "Lastikman Versus Babaeng Kidlat" (Lastikman Versus Lightning Woman) (December 7, 1995).

==== 1995 Issue #13 ====
In Issue #13: "Spektro" (December 21, 1995).

==== 1995 Issue #14 ====
In Issue #14 (December 28, 1995), the final issue featured 2 Lastikman stories.

==== 1996-1997 #Issues ====
In the 2003 movie version, Young Hilario is near a rubber tree when a meteor strikes it, and somehow gains powers of elasticity. His grandfather inspires him to use his newfound powers to do good deeds, and thus honour the memories of his dead parents. Hilario grows up to become a professor in physics, and also the superhero Lastikman.

In the 2004 movie version, Young Adrian - a lanky teenager whose father became a drunkard after the death of his mother - was mauled to death by illegal loggers whom he prevented from cutting the trees in the forest. He was left lifeless under a rubber tree, which revived him and gave him special powers.

== Costume ==
The Ravelos commissioned Bong Leal to re-design LASTIKMAN's costume for the 2007 TV series.

== In other media ==
=== Television ===
Vhong Navarro as Lastikman

For More Information, See: Lastikman (TV series)

- Mars Ravelo's Lastikman (2007)
  - Starring: Vhong Navarro as Lastikman/his human counterpart Miguel Asis/Eskappar, an import from the planet Harraio, Iya Villania as Yellena White, Cherie Gil as Ayessa White/Frosta, John Estrada as Dr. Jared Evilone/Elemento, Jason Gainza as Caloy Asis, Ian Veneracion as Agaddon, and Danilo Barrios as Ryan White/Lagablab
  - Produced by: ABS-CBN Studios
  - Directed by: Chito S. Rono/Jerome Pobocan/Tots Mariscal
  - Date Released: September 24, 2007
  - Aired on: ABS-CBN

=== Films ===
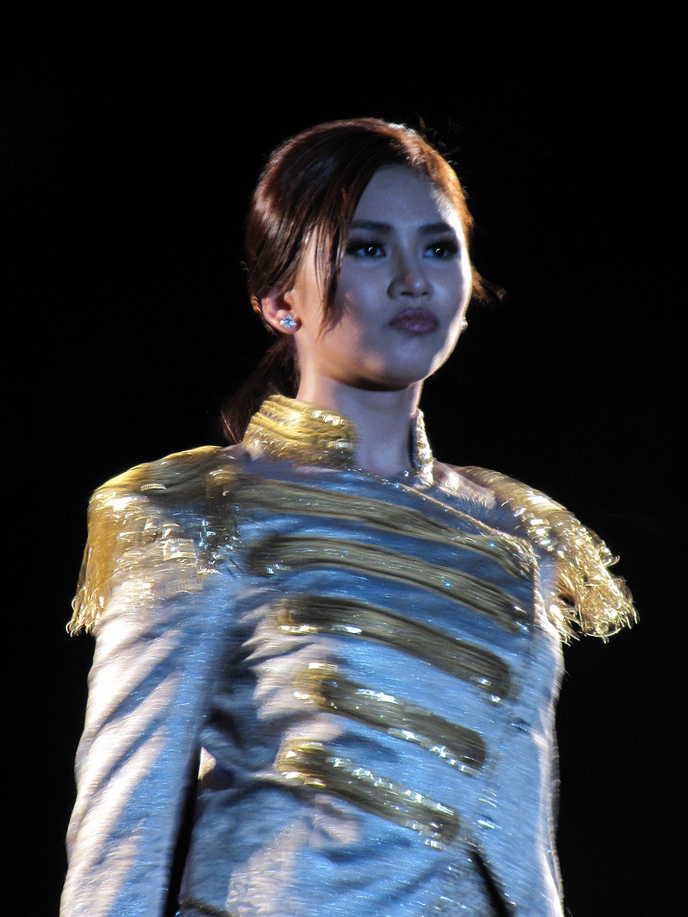
Sarah Geronimo as Lara in 2004 film

| Film | Starring | Produced by | Directed by | Date released |
|---|---|---|---|---|
| Mars Ravelo's Lastik Man | Von Serna as Lastikman | Vonabille Initial Productions; Luzon Productions | Richard Abelardo | April 16, 1965 |
| Lastikman | Vic Sotto as Lastikman/Larry; Donita Rose as Linda; Jeffrey Quizon as Stryker/Jepoy; Oyo Boy Sotto as young Larry; Anne Curtis as young Linda | OctoArts Films; M-Zet Productions | Tony Y. Reyes | January 1, 2003 |
| Mars Ravelo's Lastikman: Unang Banat | Mark Bautista as Lastikman/Adrian Rosales; Sarah Geronimo as Lara Manuel; Cherrie Gil as Lastika; John Estrada as Taong Aso; Danilo Barrios as Reden/Taong Aso | Viva Films | Mac Alejandre | December 25, 2004 |

==== Mars Ravelo's Lastik Man (1965) ====
The first to play the title role was Von Serna, the dad of Snooky Serna, in 1965.

==== Lastikman (2003) ====
Lastikman is the second film adaptation of the character, written and directed by Tony Y. Reyes. It stars Vic Sotto as Lastikman/Larry, Donita Rose as Linda, Michael V., Jeffrey Quizon as Stryker/Jepoy, Michelle Bayle, Anne Curtis as young Linda, Ryan Eigenmann, Elizabeth Oropesa, Evangeline Pascual, Joonee Gamboa and Oyo Boy Sotto as young Larry. Produced by Sotto's M-ZET TV Production, the film was released through OctoArts Films on January 1, 2003, as part of the 28th Metro Manila Film Festival.

==== Lastikman (2004) ====
Mars Ravelo's Lastikman: Unang Banat (lit. 'Mars Ravelo's Lastikman: The First Stretch'), or simply Lastikman: Unang Banat, is directed by Mac Alejandre and written by RJ Nuevas. It stars Mark Bautista as Lastikman/Adrian Rosales, Sarah Geronimo as Lara Manuel, Cherie Gil as Lastika, John Estrada as Taong Aso, Danilo Barrios as Reden/Taong Aso, Elizabeth Oropesa, Joel Torre, Mark Gil, Bearwin Meily and Tuesday Vargas. The film was released through Viva Films on December 25, 2004, as part of the 30th Metro Manila Film Festival.

=== Art and literature ===
Lastikman Komiks was a 5-Star Komiks Magasin published by Graphic Arts Service, Inc. Edited by Vic Soriano, it was published from September 28 – December 28, 1995. Its title was based on Mars Ravelo's original character Lastikman, who first appeared in the pages of Aliwan Komiks.

== Collected editions ==
| Title | Volume | Issue | Date |
|---|---|---|---|
| Lastikman | Aliwan Komiks Magasin | #49 | August 31, 1964 |
| Lastikman | Aliwan Komiks Magasin | #56 | December 7, 1964 |
| Lastikman | Aliwan Komiks Magasin | #60 | February 1, 1965 |
| Lastikman | Aliwan Komiks Magasin | #1991 | November 6, 1994 |
| Lastikman | Aliwan Komiks Magasin | #2240 | March 27, 1997 |
| Lastikman | Holiday Komiks | | 1968 |
| Lastikman | Lastikman Komiks | #1 | September 28, 1995 |
| Lastikman | Lastikman Komiks | #3 | October 12, 1995 |
| Lastikman | Lastikman Komiks | #4 | October 19, 1995 |
| Lastikman | Lastikman Komiks | #5 | October 26, 1995 |
| Lastikman | Lastikman Komiks | #6 | November 2, 1995 |
| Lastikman | Lastikman Komiks | #7 | November 9, 1995 |
| Lastikman | Lastikman Komiks | #8 | November 16, 1995 |
| Lastikman | Lastikman Komiks | #10 | November 30, 1995 |
| Lastikman | Lastikman Komiks | #11 | December 7, 1995 |
| Lastikman | Lastikman Komiks | #13 | December 21, 1995 |
| Lastikman | Lastikman Komiks | #14 | December 28, 1995 |
| Lastikman | Mango Comics | #1 | January 1, 2003 |
| Lastikman | Mango Comics | | December 2004 |
Miscellaneous
| Lastikdog: Trojan, the wonder dog | Lastikman Komiks | #1 | September 28, 1995 |

== See also ==
- Isang Lakas
- List of Filipino superheroes
