= Panaghoy sa Suba =

Panaghóy sa Subâ: The Call of the River
- Panaghoy sa Suba poster
- Directed by: Cesar Montano
- Screenplay by: Cris Vertido
- Story by: Cesar Montano
- Produced by: Cesar Montano
- Starring: Cesar Montano; Juliana Palermo; Jacky Woo
- Cinematography: Ely Cruz
- Edited by: Renato de Leon
- Music by: Nonong Buencamino
- Production company: CM Films Inc.
- Distributed by: CM Films Inc.
- Release date: December 25, 2004
- Running time: 120 minutes
- Country: Philippines
- Languages: Boholano (with English captions); Filipino; Japanese; English
- Budget: ₱25,000,000.00
- Box office: ₱15,844,266.01

Panaghoy sa Suba (English: The Call of the River or The Cry of the River; Tagalog: Ang Panaghoy ng Suba), is a 2004 Visayan language film written, co-produced and directed by Cesar Montano. The film stars Montano, Juliana Palermo and Jacky Woo. Panaghoy sa Suba is a historical romance drama about a love triangle which takes place during the Second World War. Its themes concern Filipino nationalism and the legacies of colonialism.

== Plot ==
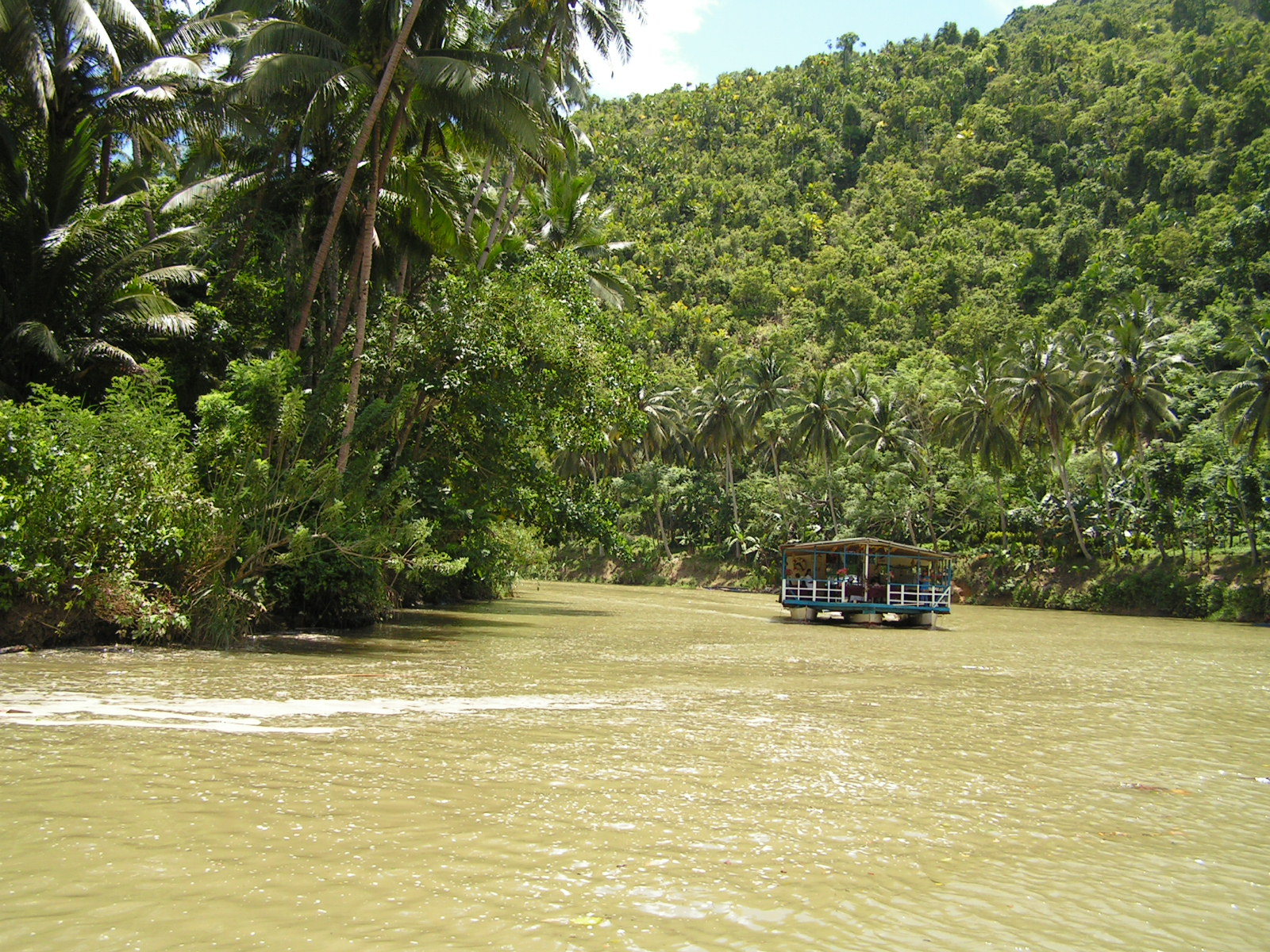
Loboc, River

The story is set in Bohol, Central Visayas during World War II before, during, and immediately after, the Japanese Occupation of the Philippines.

Duroy (Cesar Montano) is a banca operator who falls in love with Iset (Juliana Palermo), the most bewitching girl in her village. Iset is an obedient child whose father and materialistic aunt hope that she will marry the American businessman who employs her and thereby achieve wealth and status. The resident American businessman, John Smith (played by Philip Anthony), is an abusive, rude and stingy landowner. He notices Iset's beauty but sees her as a potential mistress rather than a future wife. Islet loves Duroy but obeys her parents.

Ibô (Reiven Bulado), Duroy's brother, is also smitten with Iset. As Duroy adores his family and does not want to get in his brother's way, he stops courting Iset. Duroy is devoted to his family, his mother (Daria Ramirez), Ibô and his sister, Bikay (multi-awarded former child star Rebecca Lusterio). Heartbroken after her husband leaves for an American woman and ill, Duroy's mother dies when they run out of money to purchase her medicine. John Smith sees Ibo talking with Iset at the warehouse and shoots him on the spot. Duroy vows revenge.

When the Japanese invasion begins, many men of the village flee into the mountains to become guerillas. The women and children stay, along with an American priest. John Smith is drafted into the American army and leaves. The Japanese commander who arrives notices Iset but does not attack her as many Japanese military personnel did elsewhere in the Philippines during the war. With the Japanese now in power Iset's aunt wants her to marry the officer.

Several years pass before Duroy and his men launch an attack against the Japanese garrison. The Japanese responded by killing the priest and taking hostages. In 1945, a group of Filipino and American troops arrive to help the Boholano guerrilla force defeat the Japanese troops. Duroy kills the Japanese commander after a long man-against-man battle.

John Smith (mockingly dubbed "White Balls" by Duroy and his friends) returns after the war expecting life to continue as it was before the Japanese invasion. Duroy attacks him but after beating Smith and thoroughly humiliating him tells Smith that he isn't worth killing him. Iset refuses John Smith's clumsy offer to renew their relationship and chooses Duroy.

== Cast ==
- Cesar Montano as Duroy
- Juliana Palermo as Iset
- Jacky Woo as Fumio Okohara; Japanese Army officer
- Philip Anthony as John Smith
- Caridad Sanchez as Aunt Lahi
- Joel Torre as Damian
- Ronnie Lazaro as Kuwanggol
- Daria Ramirez as Miri; Duroy's mother
- Rommel Montano as Nonong
- Rebecca Lusterio aa Bikay; Duroy's sister
- Suzette Ranillo as Nun
- Flora Gasser as Biti's Aunt
- Chelo Espina as Biti
- Ramon Villanueva as Tatoy
- Reiven Bulado as Ibô; Duroy's brother
- Dr. Warfe Engracia as Tibog
- Hans Lindgreen as Fr. Silvio
- Siony Zoilo as Amang
- Jerome Salas as Tikyo
- Rowald Montano as Entong
- Maryjay Arat as Neneng
- Cris Vertido as Laki
- Disi Alba as Baye
- Yvesse Carlo Suan

== Filming ==
The film was shot entirely in Bohol, the Philippines with a mostly Visayan cast. Cesar Montano stated that the film is in Boholano, with English subtitles. One of the producers, R.D. Alba had attended the Los Angeles Film School.

== Release ==
Panaghoy sa Suba was released by Cesar Montano's CM Films on December 25, 2004 as part of the 2004 Metro Manila Film Festival. It was released on video by GMA Records Home Video the following year.

== Screening and reception ==
Panaghoy sa Suba was given an "A" rating by the Cinema Evaluation Board (C.E.B.) of the Film Development Council of the Philippines. The CEB described Cesar Montano's direction as "meticulous but light-handed." It turned "a somewhat rambling and slow screenplay into a poetic, sometimes even magical, current of silent struggle and survival." UNESCO also endorsed the film.

Panaghoy sa Suba was included as an exhibition in the Tous les Cinemas du Monde at the Cannes Film Festival in 2005. It has also been screened at film festivals in Berlin, Toronto, Tokyo, Korea and in the Czech Republic at the "Karlo Vary Film Festival". In 2005, it was also shown at the Shanghai International Film Festival and the Festival of Asian Cinema in New Delhi.

== Awards ==
Panaghoy sa Suba won 16 awards and 11 nominations. It was entered in the 2004 Metro Manila Film Festival where it won the Gatpuno Villegas Cultural Award and others including Second Best Picture (to Mano Po III: My Love), Best Director, Best Supporting Actress, Best Screenplay, Best Cinematography and Best Musical Score. In 2005, at the Gawad Suri Awards in Manila, it won Best Actor and Best Supporting Actress awards.

The film was named Best Picture at the "International Festival of Independent Films" held in Brussels, Belgium. There, Montano was also chosen as Best Director.

At the Golden Screen Awards, Montano won Best Actor for his performance.

The awards for the film include:

- 2004
  - Best Screenplay – Cris Vertido
  - Best Cinematography – Ely Cruz
  - Best Musical Score – Nonong Buencamino
  - Best Supporting Actress – Rebecca Lusterio
  - Gatpuno Antonio J. Villegas Cultural Award – CM Films
  - Best Director – Cesar Montano
  - Second Best Picture
- Film Academy of the Philippine Awards 2005
  - Best Cinematography – Ely Cruz
  - Best Musical Scoring – Nonog Buencamino
  - Best Screenplay – Cris Vertido
  - Best Director – Cesar Montano (nominated)
  - Best Picture (nominated)
  - Best Sound (nominated)
  - Best Supporting Actor – Ronnie Lazaro (nominated)
  - Best Supporting Actress – Daria Ramirez (nominated)
- Gawad Urian Awards, 2005
  - Best Actor – Cesar Montano
  - Best Cinematography – Ely Cruz
  - Best Direction – Cesar Montano
  - Best Music – Nonog Buencamino
  - Best Picture
  - Best Sound
  - Best Editing – Renato de Leon (nominated)
  - Best Production Design (Pinakamahusay na Disenyong Pamproduksiyon) – Allan Leyres and Ron Heri Tan (nominated)
  - Best Screenplay (Pinakamahusay na Dulang Pampelikula) – Cris Vertido (nominated)
  - Best Supporting Actor (Pinakamahusay na Pangalawang Aktor) – Jacky Woo (nominated)
  - Best Supporting Actress (Pinakamahusay na Pangalawang Aktres) – Rebecca Lusterio (nominated)
  - Best Supporting Actress (Pinakamahusay na Pangalawang Aktres) – Juliana Palermo(nominated)
