= Sarah the Teen Princess =

2004 Philippine television drama series

- Title card
- Genre: Musical drama
- Created by: ABS-CBN Studios
- Written by: Jason Villamor; Christine Badillo; Celso Andres; Carlo Ventura; Lean Sales
- Directed by: Romilla Balmaceda; John-D Lazatin; Ricky Rivero
- Starring: Sarah Geronimo
- Theme music composer: Ben Escasa
- Opening theme: "Panaginip Lang Kaya" by Sarah Geronimo
- Country of origin: Philippines
- Original language: Filipino
- No. of episodes: 165

Production
- Executive producer: Nini S. Matilac
- Production location: Metro Manila
- Editors: Jesus Mendoza Jr. Rommel Malimban; Joseph Garcia
- Running time: 30 minutes
- Production company: Star Creatives

Original release
- Network: ABS-CBN
- Release: March 1 – October 22, 2004

Sarah the Teen Princess is a 2004 Philippine television drama musical series broadcast by ABS-CBN. Directed by Romilla Balmaceda, it stars Sarah Geronimo. It aired on the network's afternoon line up and worldwide on TFC from March 1 to October 22, 2004.

The series was streaming on Jeepney TV YouTube channel.

== Cast and characters ==
=== Main cast ===
- Sarah Geronimo as Sarah Alagao

=== Supporting cast ===
- Mark Bautista as Baste Dimaguiba
- Jill Yulo as Alice
- Gloria Diaz as Wendy
- Jaime Fabregas as Don Vincent
- Mikel Campos as Cedric
- Michael Agassi
- Eduardo Ward Luarca as Smith
- Eliza Pineda as Belle
- Cris Villanueva as Adam
- Glaiza de Castro as Rapunzel
- Nonie Buencamino as Marlo
- Beth Tamayo as GK
- Roence Santos
- Salbakuta
- Aiza Marquez as Jasmine
- Danilo Barrios as Julius
- Dianne dela Fuentes as Kimberly
- Christian Bautista as Christian Leynes

=== Guest cast ===
- Pia Wurtzbach
- Gigi Locsin
- Myrnell Trinidad as Japayuki
- Ricky Tangco as Temyang
- Cora Galdo as Bebang
- Kakai Bautista as Anastasia
