= Ganti (2005 TV series) =

2005 Philippine television drama series

- Also known as: Now and Forever: Vengeance of the Heart
- Genre: Drama
- Developed by: Don Michael Perez
- Written by: Kit Villanueva-Langit; Des Garbes-Severino; Luningning Interio-Ribay
- Directed by: Mac Alejandre
- Creative director: Roy Iglesias
- Starring: Nadine Samonte; Cogie Domingo
- Theme music composer: Vince de Jesus
- Opening theme: "Now and Forever" by Kyla
- Country of origin: Philippines
- Original language: Tagalog
- No. of episodes: 95

Production
- Executive producer: Camille Pengson
- Camera setup: Multiple-camera setup
- Running time: 30 minutes
- Production company: GMA Entertainment TV

Original release
- Network: GMA Network
- Release: June 13 – October 21, 2005

Ganti (transl. revenge / international title: Vengeance of the Heart) is a 2005 Philippine television drama series broadcast by GMA Network. The series is the second installment of Now and Forever. Directed by Mac Alejandre, it stars Nadine Samonte and Cogie Domingo. It premiered on June 13, 2005. The series concluded on October 21, 2005, with a total of 95 episodes.

== Cast and characters ==
Cast

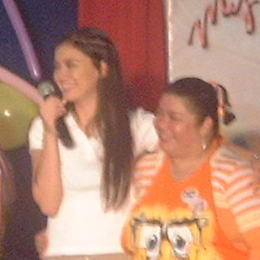
Nadine Samonte (left)

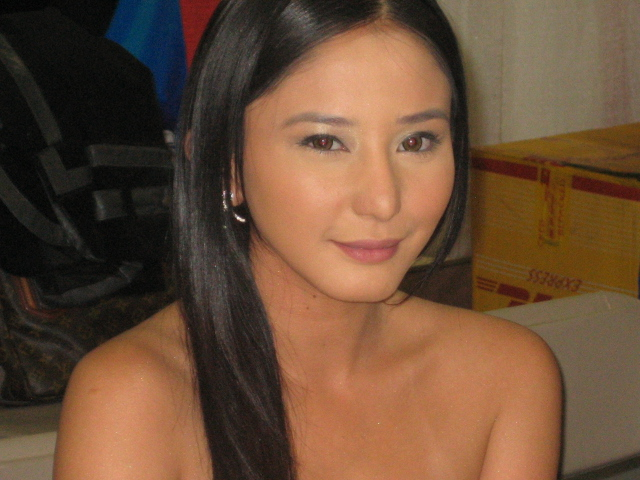
Katrina Halili

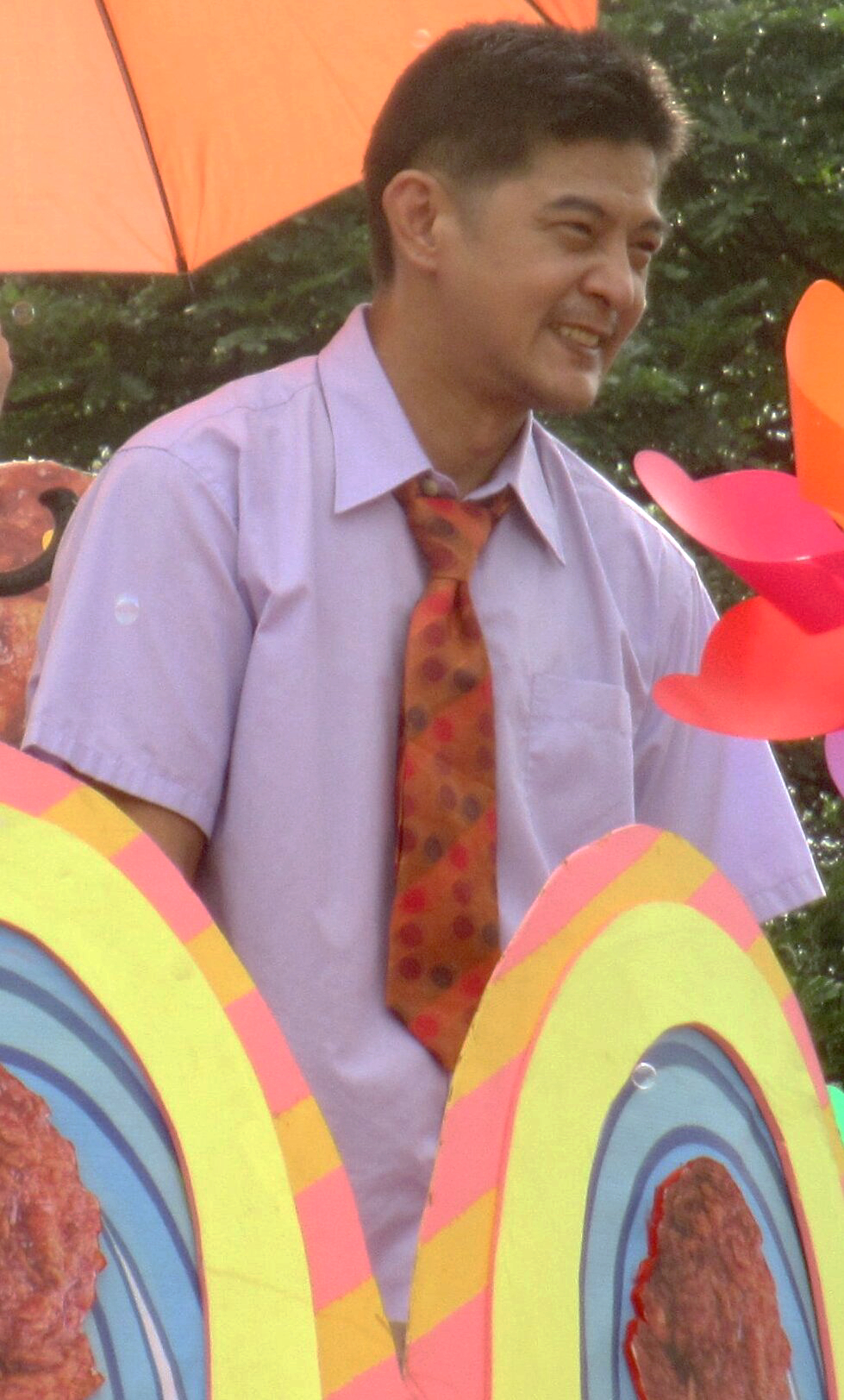
Romnick Sarmenta

Lead cast

- Nadine Samonte as Marianne
- Cogie Domingo as Javier

Supporting cast

- Sheryl Cruz as Samantha
- Zoren Legaspi as Dennis
- Jean Saburit as Eva
- James Blanco as Luis
- Beth Tamayo as Carmela
- Romnick Sarmenta as Henry
- Cris Villanueva as Alfred
- Katrina Halili as Alexa
- Tin Arnaldo as Josephine
- Rainier Castillo as Ricky

Recurring cast

- Noel Trinidad as Manolo
- Roy Alvarez as Gerardo
- Ces Quesada as Ditas
- Jordan Herrera as Nestor
- Valerie Concepcion as Emily
- Eva Darren as Nenita
