= Ador (surname) =

Ador is a surname. Notable people with the surname include:

- Galo Ador Jr. (1969–2008), Filipino comic book author
- Gustave Ador (1845–1928), Swiss politician
