= Click (Philippine TV series) =

Philippine television drama series

- Title card in 2002
- Genre: Drama
- Developed by: Don Michael Perez
- Written by: Don Michael Perez; Clarissa Estuar; Joel Rufino Nuñez; Denoy Punio-Navarro; Kit Villanueva-Zapata; Abi Lam-Parayno; Jke See; Jon Mendoza
- Directed by: Mac Alejandre
- Theme music composer: Jingle Buena
- Opening theme: "Centerfold" by Adam Austin; "Let's Give It a Try" by Click cast
- Country of origin: Philippines
- Original language: Tagalog
- No. of seasons: 5
- No. of episodes: 248

Production
- Executive producers: Rams David; Camille Pengson
- Producers: Wilma Galvante; Gigi Santiago-Lara
- Production locations: Metro Manila, Philippines
- Cinematography: Jay Linao
- Camera setup: Multiple-camera setup
- Running time: 27–88 minutes
- Production company: GMA Entertainment TV

Original release
- Network: GMA Network
- Release: December 4, 1999 – July 24, 2004

Click is a Philippine television drama series broadcast by GMA Network. Directed by Mac Alejandre, it stars James Blanco, Roxanne Barcelo, Richard Gutierrez, Maybelyn Dela Cruz, Alessandra de Rossi, Angel Locsin, Jake Cuenca, Karen delos Reyes, JC de Vera, Drew Arellano, Iya Villania and Chynna Ortaleza. It premiered on December 4, 1999. The series concluded on July 24, 2004, with a total of 248 episodes.

The series is streaming online on YouTube.

== Cast and characters ==
Cast

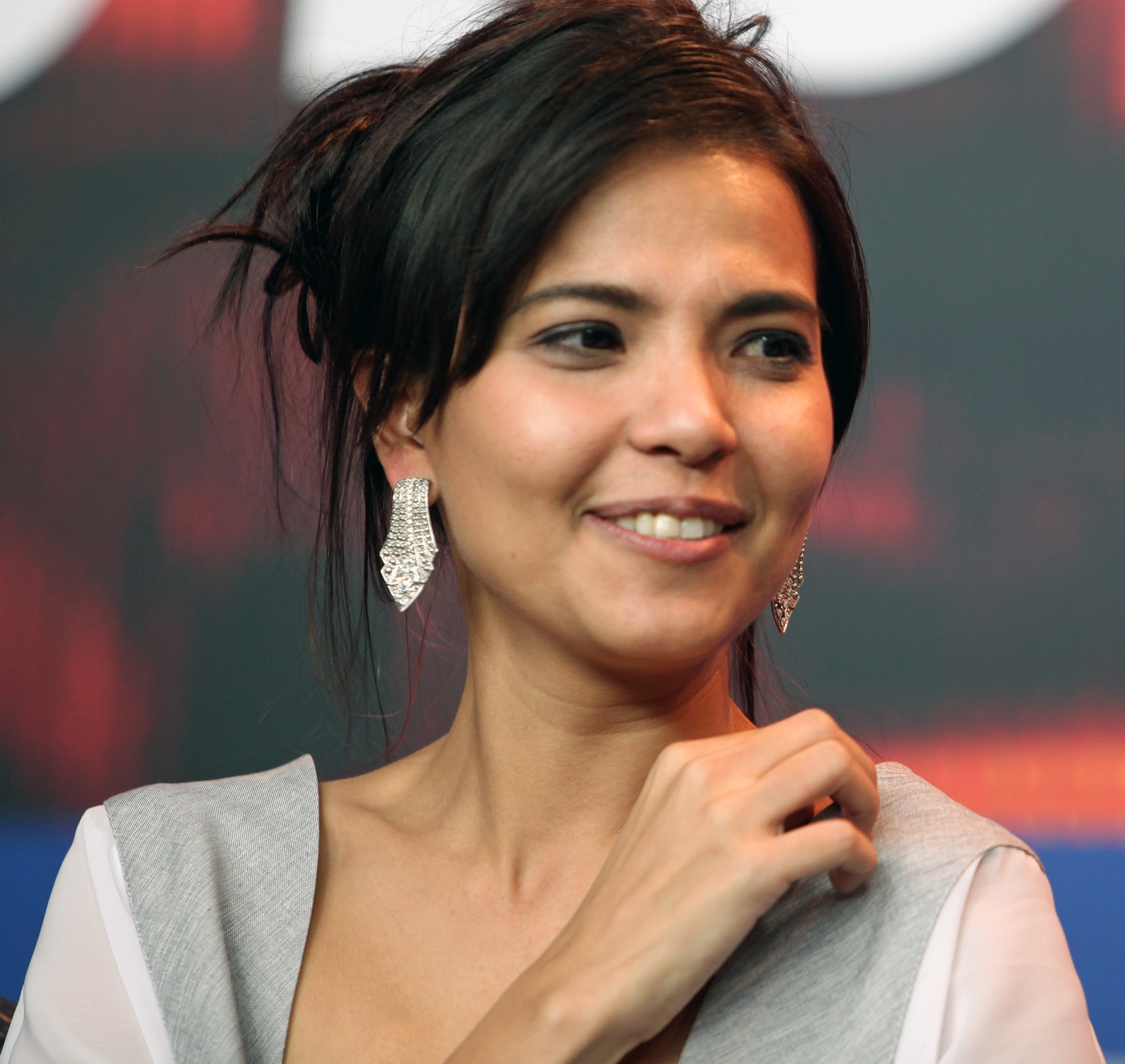
Alessandra De Rossi

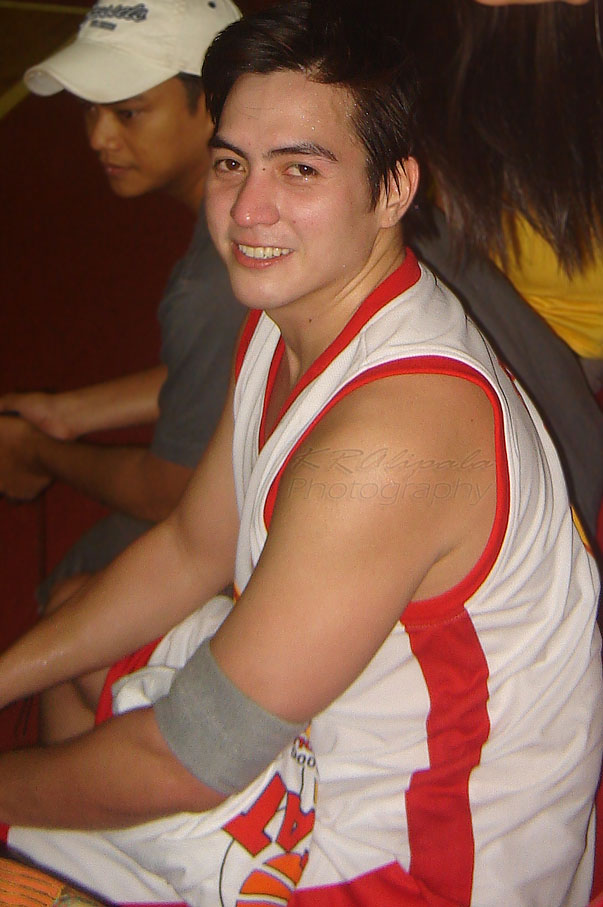
Wendell Ramos

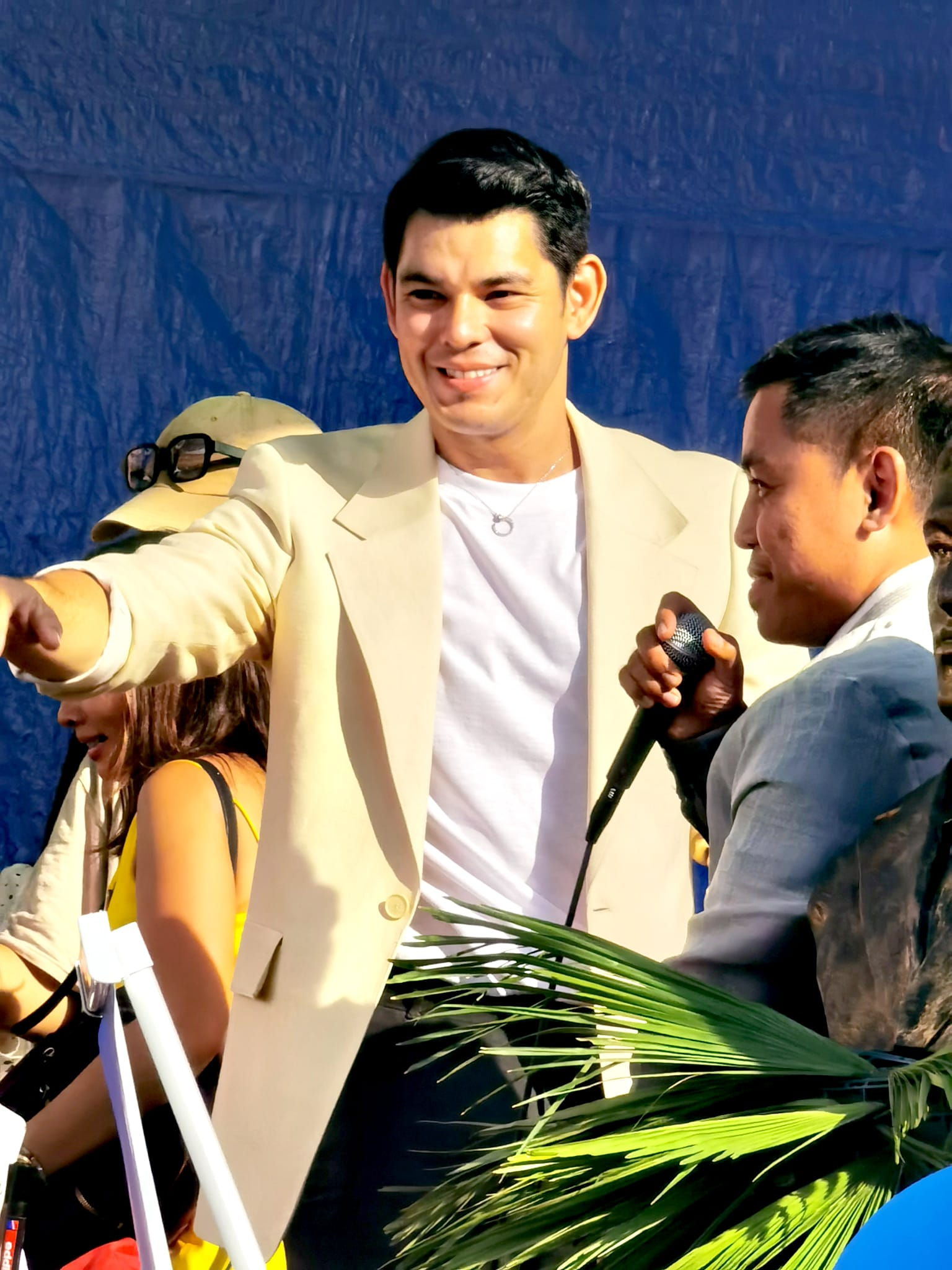
Richard Gutierrez

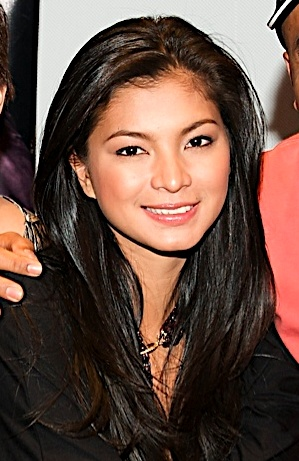
Angel Locsin

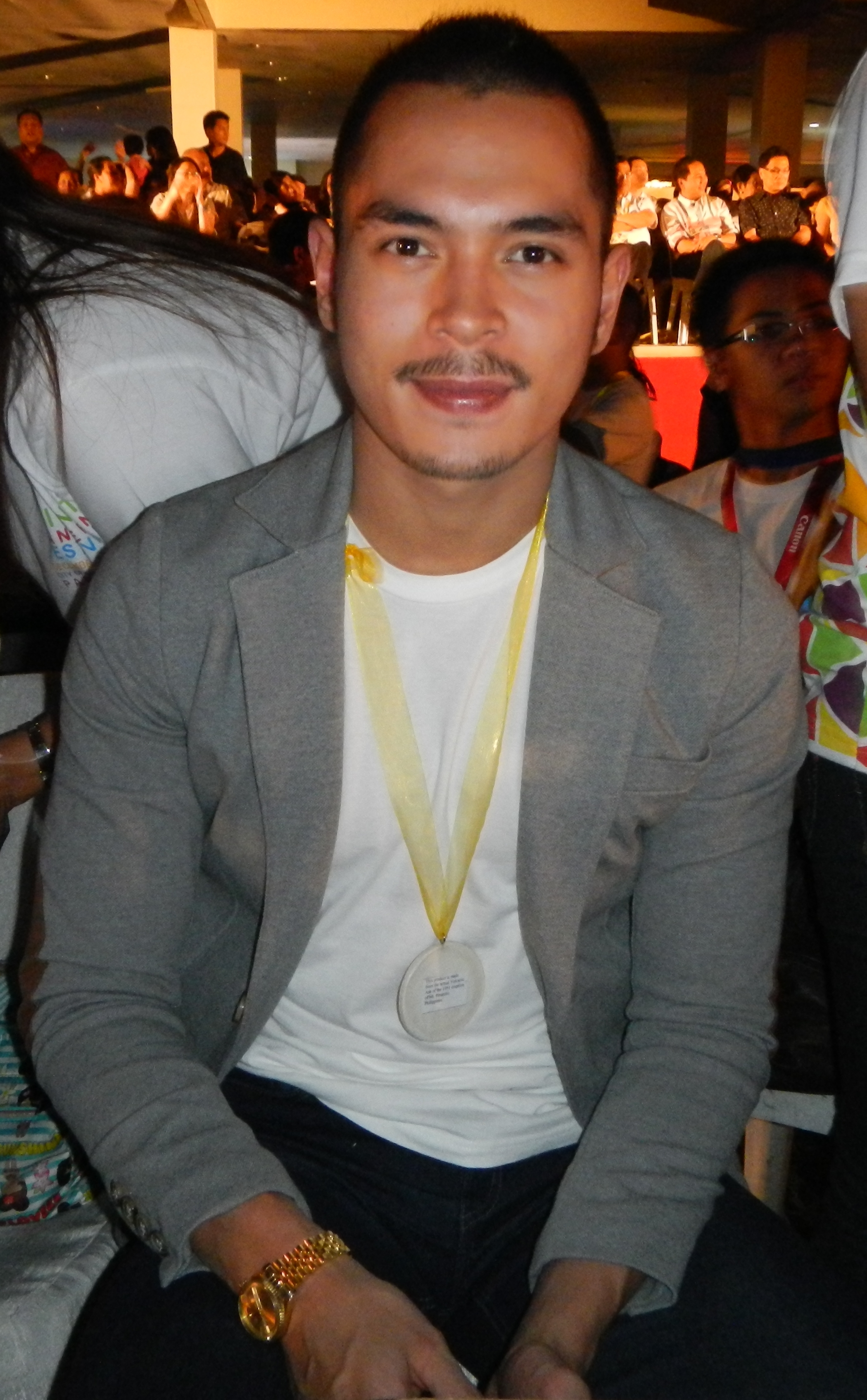
Jake Cuenca

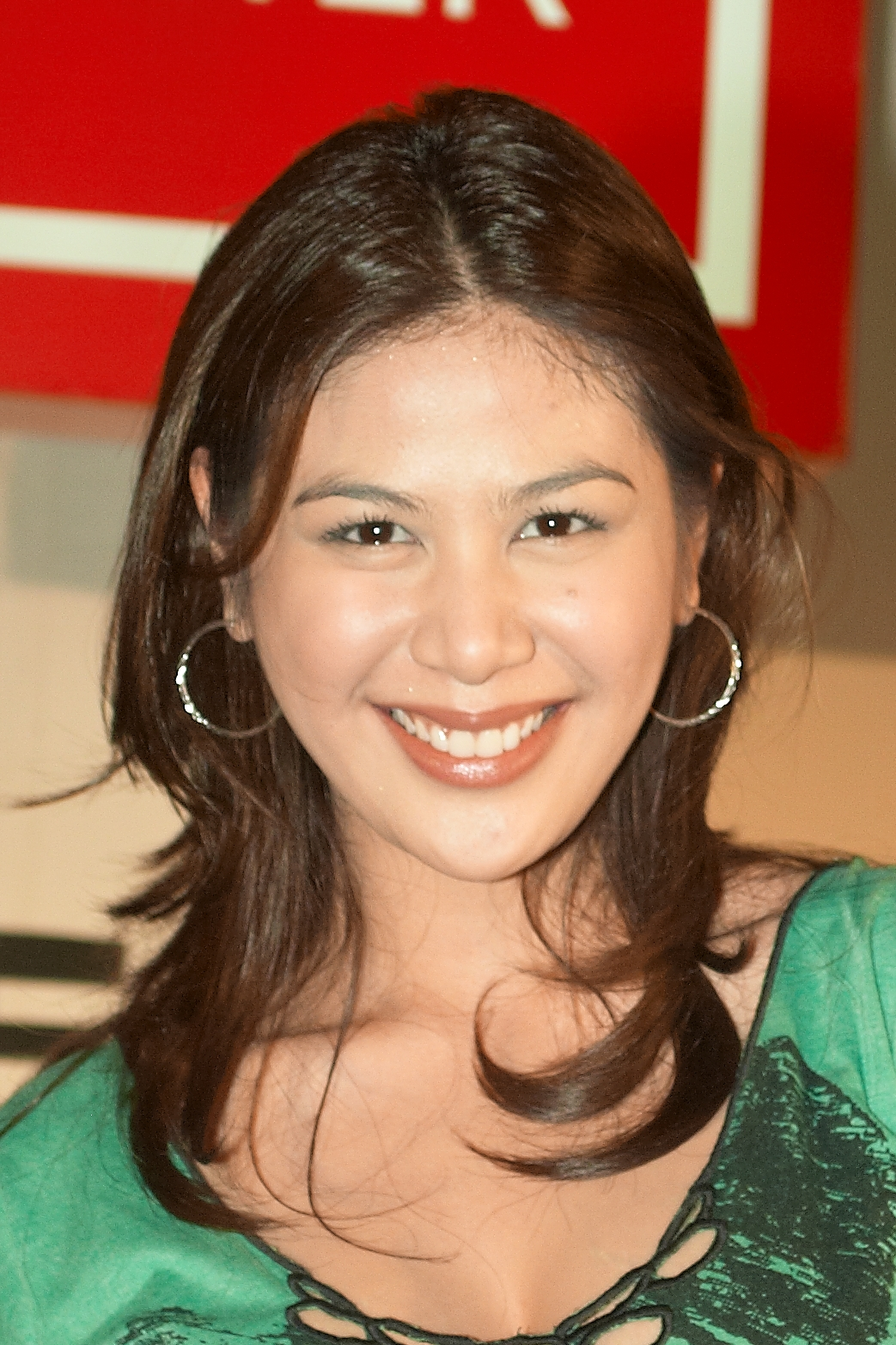
Valerie Concepcion

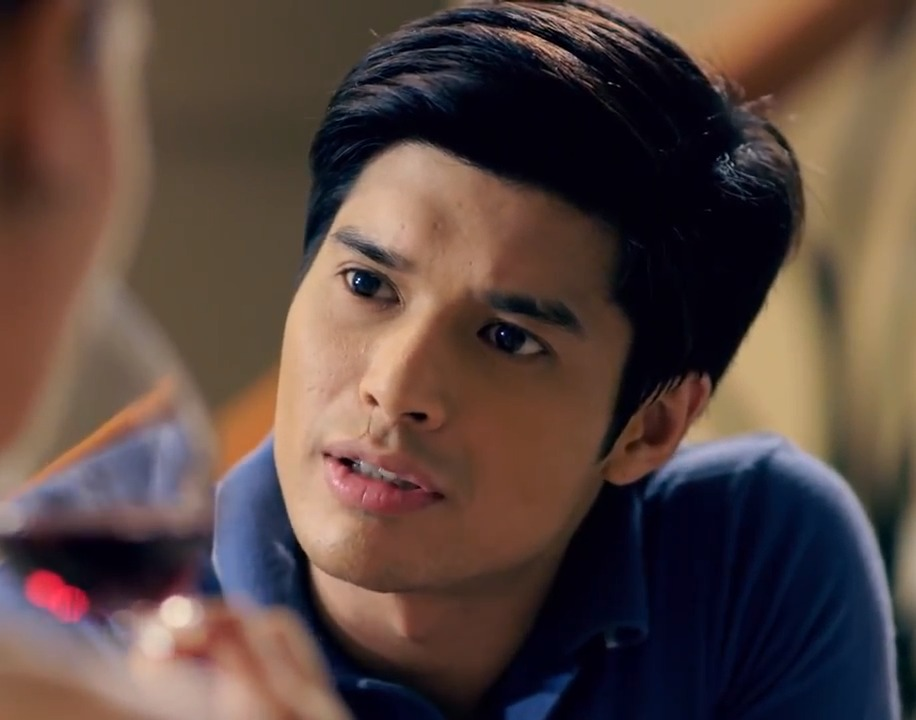
JC de Vera

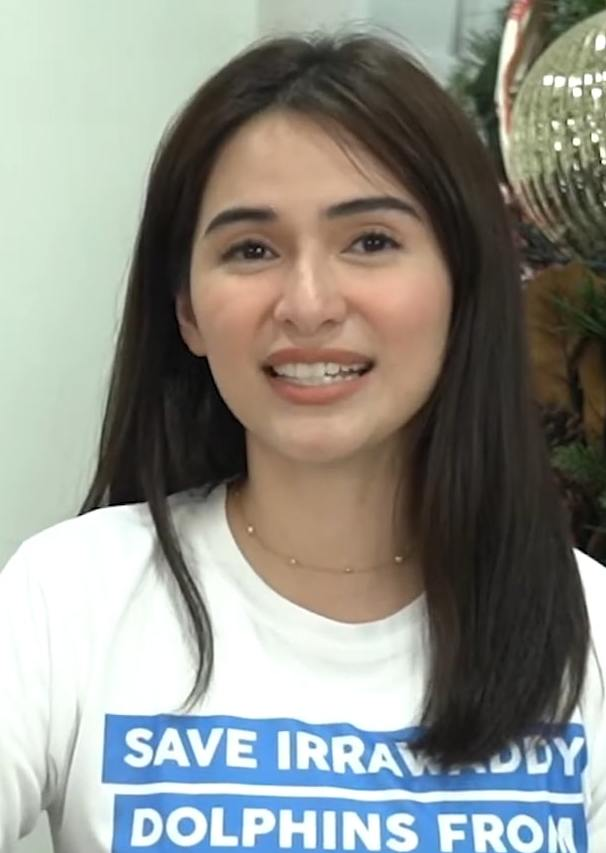
Jennylyn Mercado

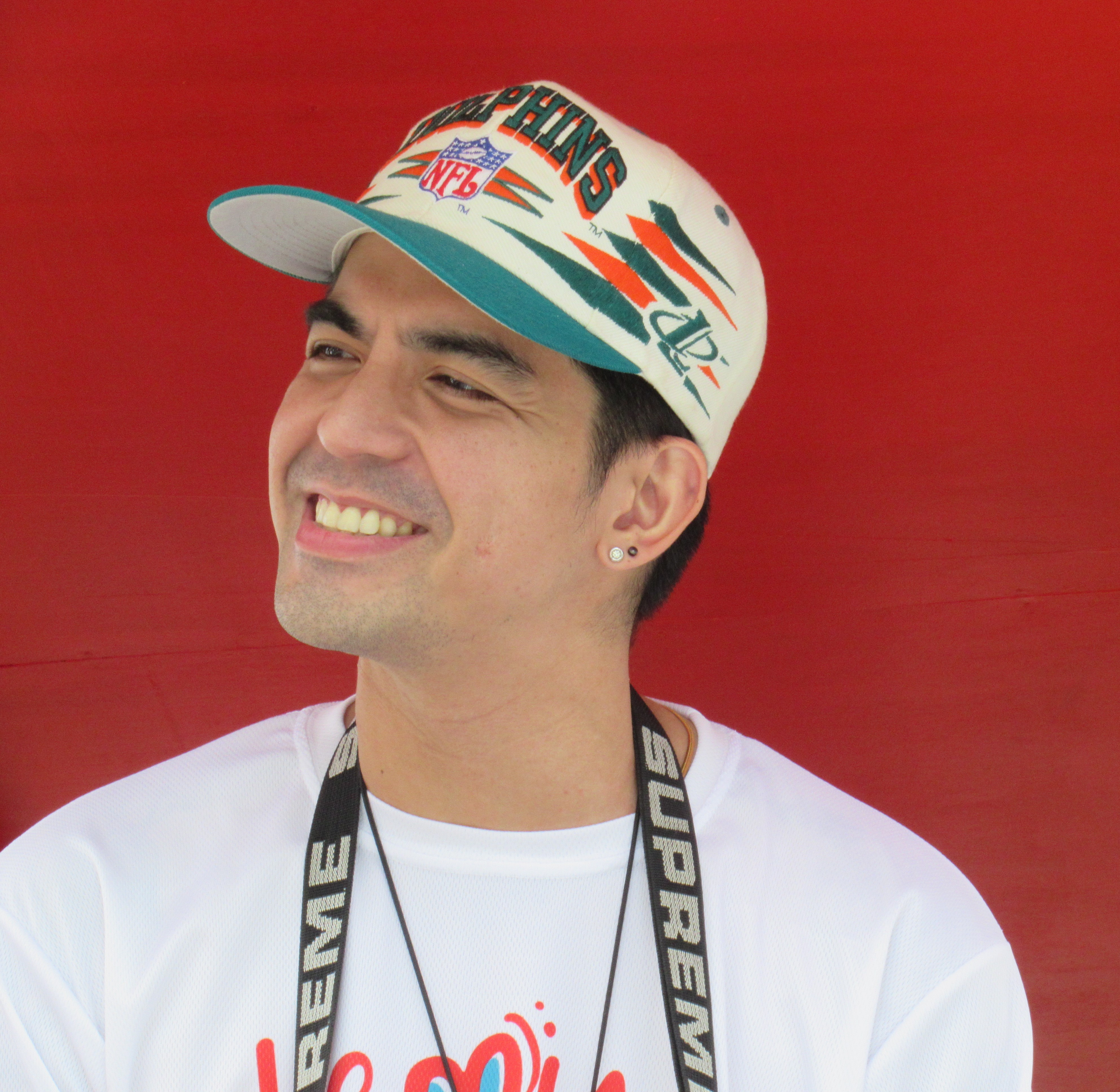
Mark Herras

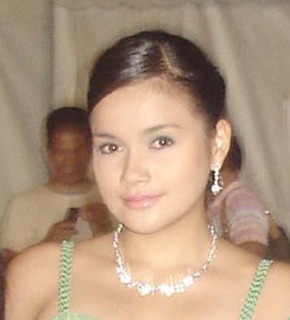
Yasmien Kurdi

=== Main cast ===
- Maybelyn dela Cruz as Rosario "Rose" Mercado (1999–2002)
- Biboy Ramirez as Christian Dean Lacson (1999–2002)
- Tricia Roman as Isabella "Issa" Pascual (1999–2004)
- Joseph Izon as Nicholas "Nikko" Mercado (1999–2000)
- Trina Zuñiga as Melanie "Melai" Santos (1999–2001)
- Roxanne Barcelo as Antoinette "Toni" Darden (1999–2002)
- Danilo Barrios as Francisco "Popoy" Musngi (1999–2000)
- Erwin Aquino as Paolo Rosales (1999–2000)
- Jason Red as Medwin Rosales (1999–2000)
- James Blanco as Antonio Precioso “Anton” Relucio (2000–02)
- Angelika Dela Cruz as Olivia “Ollie” San Gabriel (2000)
- Sherwin Ordoñez as Jose Basilio "JB" Montelibano (2000–03)
- Wowie de Guzman as Hector (2000–01)
- Wendell Ramos as Benedict "Ben" Santillan (2000–01)
- Antoinette Taus as Alicia "Allie" Mendoza (2000)
- Alessandra De Rossi as Vivian "Ian" Rufino (2000–03)
- Miko Sotto as Joselito "Joey" Mendoza (2000–02)
- Danica Sotto as Maria Carina "Kara" Rodriguez (2000–03)
- Cogie Domingo as Giovanni "Gio" Santillan (2000–01)
- Chynna Ortaleza as Michaela "Mimi" Mendez (2001–03)
- Miles Poblete as Dang Dingle (2001–02)
- Richard Gutierrez as Lorenzo "Enzo" Francisco (2002–03)
- Angel Locsin as Charlotte Anne "Charley" Francisco (2002–04)
- Railey Valeroso as Frederico "Icko" Ocampo (2002–04)
- Bryan Revilla as Emilio "Emil" (2002–04)
- AJ Eigenmann as Joshua "Josh" Mendez (2002–04)
- Karen delos Reyes as Rowena "Weng" / "Weena" Abergas (2002–04)
- Dyan Delfin as Annabelle "Belle" Castillo (2002–03)
- Jake Cuenca as Tryke (2003–04)
- Iya Villania as Sydney Torres (2003–04)
- Drew Arellano as Gilbert (2003–04)
- Valerie Concepcion as Yasmin (2003–04)
- Charina Scott as Destiny "Desi" (2003–04)
- Denise Laurel as Beatriz (2003–04)
- Jolo Revilla as Joma (2003–04)
- JC de Vera as Benjamin "Benj" (2003–04)
- Mikel Campos as Nathan (2003–04)
- Lester Llansang as Buj (2003–04)
- Crystal Moreno as Claudine / Len Len (2003–04)
- Jennylyn Mercado as Caroline (2004)
- Mark Herras as Miguel "Migs" (2004)
- Rainier Castillo as Gerard "Jerry" (2004)
- Yasmien Kurdi as Leilani (2004)
- Bianca King as Marnie (2004)
- Warren Austria as Lance (2004)

=== Recurring and guest cast ===
- Edward dela Cruz as Jet San Gabriel
- Joshua Diaz as Donjie Mallari
- Dexter Doria as Rhoda Navarro
- Mel Kimura as Ms. Alvarez
- Mel Martinez as Aricheta
- Nonie Buencamino as Arthur Lacson
- Irma Adlawan as Melai's mother
- Rayver Cruz as Mumoy
- Stella Canete as Christian’s mother
- Oliver Hartmann as Hans
- Isabelle de Leon
- Sunshine Dizon
- Pia Wurtzbach as Frankie
- Dingdong Dantes as Jake
- Joko Diaz as Victor Tamayo
- Katarina Perez as Che
- Jet Alcantara as William Francis "Francis" Victorino
- Russel Mon as Vito
- J4 Zabale as Karl
- Ryan Serrano as Mark
- Debra Liz
- Odette Khan as Demetria Dingle
- Joanne Salazar
- Ryan Robles
- JR Follero
- Gayle Valencia as Dang
- Aiza Marquez as Annaliza “Aiza” Atanacio
- Tiya Pusit as Che’s mother
- Gloria Diaz as Mamu Milagros "Aos" Rufino
- Jackie Castillejo as Issa's mother
- Mandy Ochoa as Enrico Pascual
- Matet de Leon as Desiree
- Dino Guevarra as Arguelles
- Richard Quan
- Dick Israel
- Paolo Ballesteros
- Dianne Sison as Natalie
- Gerard Pizarras as Diego
- Dennis Roldan as Icko's father
- Gabby Eigenmann as Mark Cabrera / Marky
- Serena Dalrymple
- Polo Ravales as Joseph
- Iza Calzado as Patty
- Coco Martin as Wesley "Yumyum" Cariño
- Dang Cruz as Jasmine
- Daisy Reyes as Pauline
- Nina Ricci Alagao as Sammie
- Anne Curtis as Bianca
- Lloyd Zaragoza as Owen
- Glaiza de Castro as Pia
- Mickey Ferriols as Sweet
- Dennis Padilla as Mang Gus
- Martin Andanar as himself
- Bong Revilla
- Gladys Reyes
- Gene Padilla as Mimi's ex-boyfriend
- Vangie Labalan as Pia's mother
- Matt Ranillo as Nomer
- Pinky Amador as Marge
- Juan Rodrigo as Mimi and Josh's father
- Pia Pilapil as Mimi and Josh's mother
- Caloy Alde as Pia's father
- Vanna Garcia as Justine

== Accolades ==
Accolades received by Click
Year	Award	Category	Recipient	Result	Ref.
2000	14th PMPC Star Awards for Television	Best New Male Personality	James Blanco	Won	
2002	Catholic Mass Media Awards	Best Youth Drama Program	Click	Won	
2002	16th PMPC Star Awards for Television	Best Youth Oriented Show	Click	Won	
2003	Anak TV Seal Awards		Click	Won	
2003	17th PMPC Star Awards for Television	Best New Female Personality	Valerie Concepcion	Won	
2003	17th PMPC Star Awards for Television	Best Youth Oriented Show	Click	Won	
2004	Anak TV Seal Awards		Click	Won	
2004	18th PMPC Star Awards for Television	Best Male New TV Personality	Rainier Castillo	Won	
2004	18th PMPC Star Awards for Television	Best Youth Oriented Show	Click	Won	
