= Rebecca Lusterio =

Filipino actress

- Born: December 3, 1989 (age 35); Panglao, Bohol, Philippines
- Occupation: Occasional actress
- Parent(s): Verano Lusterio (father); Helen Lusterio (mother)
- Awards: Best Child Actress and Best Supporting Actress

Rebecca Lusterio (born December 3, 1989) is a Filipino actress. She won the Gawad Urian and FAMAS awards.

== Career ==
Rebecca Lusterio was cast in the movie Muro-Ami in 1999. For her role, she won the Philippines' best child actress in both the FAMAS and PMPC’s Star Awards.

She had some TV appearances in Manila but decided to return to Bohol to continue her studies at the San Agustin Academy (Panglao) in Panglao.

Five years later, she appeared in the Visayan movie Panaghoy sa Suba (The Call of the River), a Visayan romantic film shot in Bohol. The film takes place during the Japanese occupation of the Philippines.

She won the Best Supporting Actress Award in the 2004 Metro Manila Film Festival (MMFF).

In 2004, the Colegio de San Juan de Letran offered a full-scholarship to Lusterio. She pursued Mass Communication.

Lusterio graduated as a scholar on April 27, 2010, with a degree in AB Communication Arts.

== Filmography ==
=== Film ===
| Year | Title | Role |
|---|---|---|
| 1999 | Muro Ami | Kalbo |
| 2004 | Panaghoy sa Suba | Bikay |
| 2006 | Ligalig | Rowena |

=== TV appearances ===
- Kool Ka Lang (1998)
- Beh Bote Nga (1998)
- Mel and Joey (2005)
- Rated K (2008)

== Awards and nominations ==
| Year | Award-giving body | Category | Work | Result |
|---|---|---|---|---|
| 1999 | Metro Manila Film Festival | Best Child Performer | Muro Ami | Won |
| 2000 | Star Awards for Movies | New Movie Actress of the Year | Muro Ami | Won |
| 2000 | Star Awards for Movies | Star Award Child Performer of the Year | Muro Ami | Won |
| 2000 | FAMAS Award | Best Child Actress | Muro Ami | Won |
| 2004 | Metro Manila Film Festival | Best Supporting Actress | Panaghoy sa Suba (The Call of the River) | Won |
| 2005 | Gawad Urian Awards | Best Supporting Actress (Pinakamahusay na Pangalawang Aktres) | Panaghoy sa Suba (The Call of the River) | Nominated |
