= James Blanco =

Filipino actor, singer, dancer, and model (born 1981)

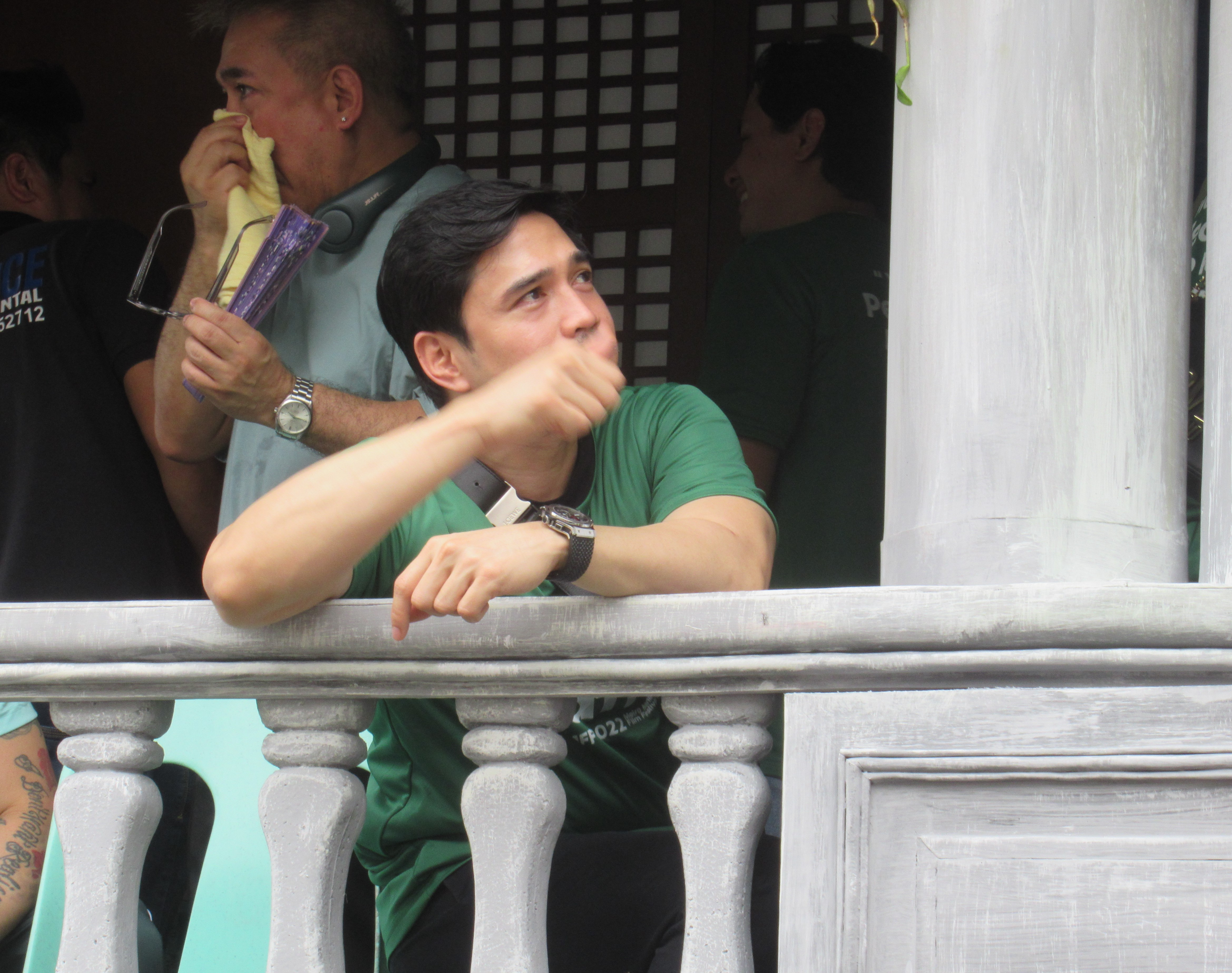
- Born: James Blanco Castillo; 15 June 1981 (age 45); Manila, Philippines
- Other names: Jay, Jack, Jonathan
- Occupations: Actor, singer, dancer, model
- Years active: 2000–present
- Agent: Freelancer (2000–present)
- Television: ABS-CBN; GMA Network; TV5 Network
- Spouse: Tania Creighton-Castillo (m. 2002–2026)
- Children: 3

James Blanco Castillo (born June 15, 1981), known professionally as James Blanco, is a Filipino actor, singer, dancer, and model. He is known for his roles in Ikaw Lang ang Mamahalin (2001–2002), Rubi (2010), Lorenzo's Time (2012), One More Chance (2007), Now and Forever: Ganti (2005) and in the 2014 GMA afternoon primetime Yagit as Victor Guison. Blanco was also notable for his roles in the youth oriented shows Click (1999–2002) and Kahit Kailan (2002–2003), both on GMA Network.

== Early life and background ==
Blanco was born on June 15, 1981 in Manila, Philippines, the Filipino actor spent his early life in the capital. He attended AMA Computer University for his freshman year before choosing to put his education on hold to pursue a highly successful career in the entertainment industry.

== Acting career ==
Blanco known for his extensive work in both television dramas and films, his career highlights include a Best Actor win at the 20th Asian Film Festival and prominent roles in One More Chance (2007), Prima Donnas (2020–2022), and Forever Young (2024–2025).

Blanco is part of the ensemble cast in the 2026 Philippine television adaptation of the medical drama The Good Doctor.

In 2026, joined the GMA Public Affairs drama-musical series You're My Favorite Song, where he plays the character Enrico Monteverde. In this role, he portrays a grieving father who searches for his missing daughter by singing the song he wrote for her.

== Personal life ==
Blanco is previously married to Tania Creighton-Castillo and has three children.

== Acting credits ==
=== Film ===
Key
| † | Denotes films that have not yet been released |

James Blanco's film credits with year of release, film titles and roles
| Year | Title | Role | Ref. |
|---|---|---|---|
| 2001 | Cool Dudes 24/7 | John | |
| 2001 | Bahay ni Lola | Neil | |
| 2002 | Home Alone da Riber | Vic | |
| 2004 | Homecoming | | |
| 2004 | Kuya | Vincent | |
| 2004 | Sigaw | Jude | |
| 2005 | Lovestruck | | |
| 2005 | Kutob | RJ | |
| 2006 | I Will Always Love You | Andrew | |
| 2007 | One More Chance | Kenneth Del Rosario | |
| 2012 | Guni-Guni | Angelo | |
| 2015 | A Second Chance | Kenneth Del Rosario | |
| 2016 | Pilapil | | |
| 2017 | Mang Kepweng Returns | Dr. Zacharias Rivera | |
| 2017 | Ang Guro Kong 'Di Marunong Magbasa | Abdul | |
| 2021 | Huwag Kang Lalabas | Berting (segment: "Bahay") | |
| 2022 | Family Matters | Nelson | |
| 2023 | The Monkey and the Turtle | Manuel Palma | |
| 2024 | Selda ng Kahapon | Ernie | |
| 2024 | Outside | Diego | |
| 2025 | Isla Babuyan | David | |

=== Television ===
Key
| † | Denotes shows that have not yet been aired |

James Blanco's television credits with year of release, title(s) and role
| Year | Title | Role | Ref. |
|---|---|---|---|
| 2000–2002 | Click | Anton | |
| 2001–2002 | Ikaw Lang ang Mamahalin | Joseph Marcelo | |
| 2002 | Pangako ng Lupa | Paul | |
| 2002–2003 | Kahit Kailan | Victor | |
| 2003–2004 | Narito ang Puso Ko | Santiago "Santi" Tatlonghari | |
| 2004 | Ikaw sa Puso Ko | Alfie | |
| 2004–2005 | Mulawin | Aramis | |
| 2005 | Sugo | Topel | |
| 2005 | Bubble Gang | Himself | |
| 2005 | Now and Forever: Ganti | Luis | |
| 2006 | Hongkong Flight 143 | Andy | |
| 2006 | Noel | | |
| 2006 | Komiks Presents: Inday sa Balitaw | Cleto | |
| 2006 | Komiks Presents: Da Adventures of Pedro Penduko | Tricycle Driver | |
| 2007 | Kemis: Ke Misis Umaasa | | |
| 2007 | Your Song Presents: With You | Ramil | |
| 2007 | Your Song Presents: Wishing Lampira | Bob | |
| 2007–2008 | Lastikman | Albert "Alingasaw" Langitan | |
| 2008 | Maalaala Mo Kaya: Sanggol | Francis | |
| 2008 | Maalaala Mo Kaya: Card | Miguel | |
| 2009 | Maalaala Mo Kaya: Bulaklak | Arnel | |
| 2009 | Nasaan Ka Maruja? | Caloy Ruedo | |
| 2010 | Maalaala Mo Kaya: Plane Ticket | Young Tomas | |
| 2010 | Rubi | Marco | |
| 2010 | Beauty Queen | Young Virgilio | |
| 2010 | Magkaribal | Young Manuel Abella | |
| 2010–2011 | Inday Wanda | Toryo | |
| 2011 | Rod Santiago's The Sisters | Dennis | |
| 2011 | Regal Shocker Presents: Espiritista | Carlos | |
| 2011 | Mga Nagbabagang Bulaklak | Eros | |
| 2012 | Regal Shocker Presents: Gayuma | Levi | |
| 2012 | Valiente | Joel Gatchalian | |
| 2012 | Wansapanataym Presents: Trick or Trixie | Trixie's dad | |
| 2012 | Maalaala Mo Kaya: Upuan | Angel | |
| 2012 | Maalaala Mo Kaya: Flyers | Young Luis | |
| 2012 | Mundo Man ay Magunaw | Young Dante Santos | |
| 2012 | Makapiling Kang Muli | Emilio dela Rosa | |
| 2012 | Lorenzo's Time | Jonas Silvestre / Archimedes "Archie" Montereal | |
| 2012–2020; 2025–present | ASAP XP | Co-host / Performer | |
| 2013 | Wansanapanatym Presents: Tago, Diego, Tago! | Tatay | |
| 2013 | Juan dela Cruz | Emil | |
| 2013 | Maalaala Mo Kaya: Drawing | Arnel | |
| 2013 | Kahit Konting Pagtingin | Jacob Dimagiba | |
| 2014 | Maalaala Mo Kaya: Seashells | Gardo | |
| 2014 | The Legal Wife | Young Javier Santiago | |
| 2014 | Mirabella | Alfred Robles | |
| 2014 | Ipaglaban Mo: Hindi Ko Sinasadya, Yaya | Jimmy | |
| 2014 | Magpakailanman: Habang Buhay Na Maghihintay - The Elvira Bolo Story | Tirso | |
| 2014–2015 | Yagit | Victor Guison | |
| 2015 | Magpakailanman: My Teacher, My Rapist | Sir Paras | |
| 2015 | Karelasyon: Bayaw | Ninoi | |
| 2015 | Wagas: Love in the Time of Yolanda | Joel | |
| 2015–2016 | Marimar | Rodolfo San Jinez | |
| 2016 | Dear Uge: Ang Tunay na Buhay ni Antonietta | Rodrigo | |
| 2016 | Karelasyon: Transwoman | Glen | |
| 2016 | The Millionaire's Wife | Mark Crisostomo | |
| 2016 | FPJ's Ang Probinsyano | Edwin Maniego | |
| 2016 | Ipaglaban Mo: Witness | Raul | |
| 2017 | Maalaala Mo Kaya: Makeup | Mark | |
| 2017 | Ipaglaban Mo: Pikot | Manuel | |
| 2017 | Road Trip | Guest | |
| 2017 | Dear Uge: Gate Crush | Dave | |
| 2017 | Maalaala Mo Kaya: Kakanin | Edwin | |
| 2017–2018 | Impostora | Eric Espiritu | |
| 2018 | Ipaglaban Mo: Ate | Cardo | |
| 2018 | Magpakailanman: Tatay Ng Lansangan - The Butch Nerja Story | Butch | |
| 2018 | Tadhana | Tonyo | |
| 2018 | Maalaala Mo Kaya: Hapagkainan | Robert | |
| 2018 | Ipaglaban Mo: Nars | Glen | |
| 2018 | Maalaala Mo Kaya: Lason | Raul | |
| 2018 | Onanay | Mark | |
| 2018 | Maalaala Mo Kaya: Red Lipstick | Mike | |
| 2019 | Ipaglaban Mo: Apelyido | Harry | |
| 2019 | Maalaala Mo Kaya: Family Portrait | young Edong | |
| 2019 | Dragon Lady | Bryan Atienza | |
| 2019–2020 | The Killer Bride | Juan Felipe Dela Torre | |
| 2020 | Ipaglaban Mo: Tukso | Gio | |
| 2020 | Beauty Queens | Roger | |
| 2020–2022 | Prima Donnas | Ruben Escalante | |
| 2021 | Dear Uge: Masahe Is Key | Bernard | |
| 2021 | Wish Ko Lang: Ghost Child | Tom | |
| 2022 | Wish Ko Lang: A Mother's Love | Michael | |
| 2022–2025 | Family Feud | Contestant | |
| 2024 | Eat Bulaga! | Guest | |
| 2024–2025 | Forever Young | Rigor Peralta | |
| 2025 | Slay | Hector Baltazar | |
| 2025 | Maalaala Mo Kaya: Gumamela | Albert | |
| 2025–2026 | Cruz vs Cruz | Joselito | |
| 2026 | Rainbow Rumble | Contestant | |
| 2026 | You're My Favorite Song | Enrico Montaverde | |
| TBA | The Good Doctor † | | |

== Accolades ==
| Year | Award giving body | Category | Nominated work | Results |
|---|---|---|---|---|
| 2000 | 14th PMPC Star Awards for TV | Best New Male TV Personality | Click | Won |
