= Ador Welding =

Indian welding company

Ador Welding Limited
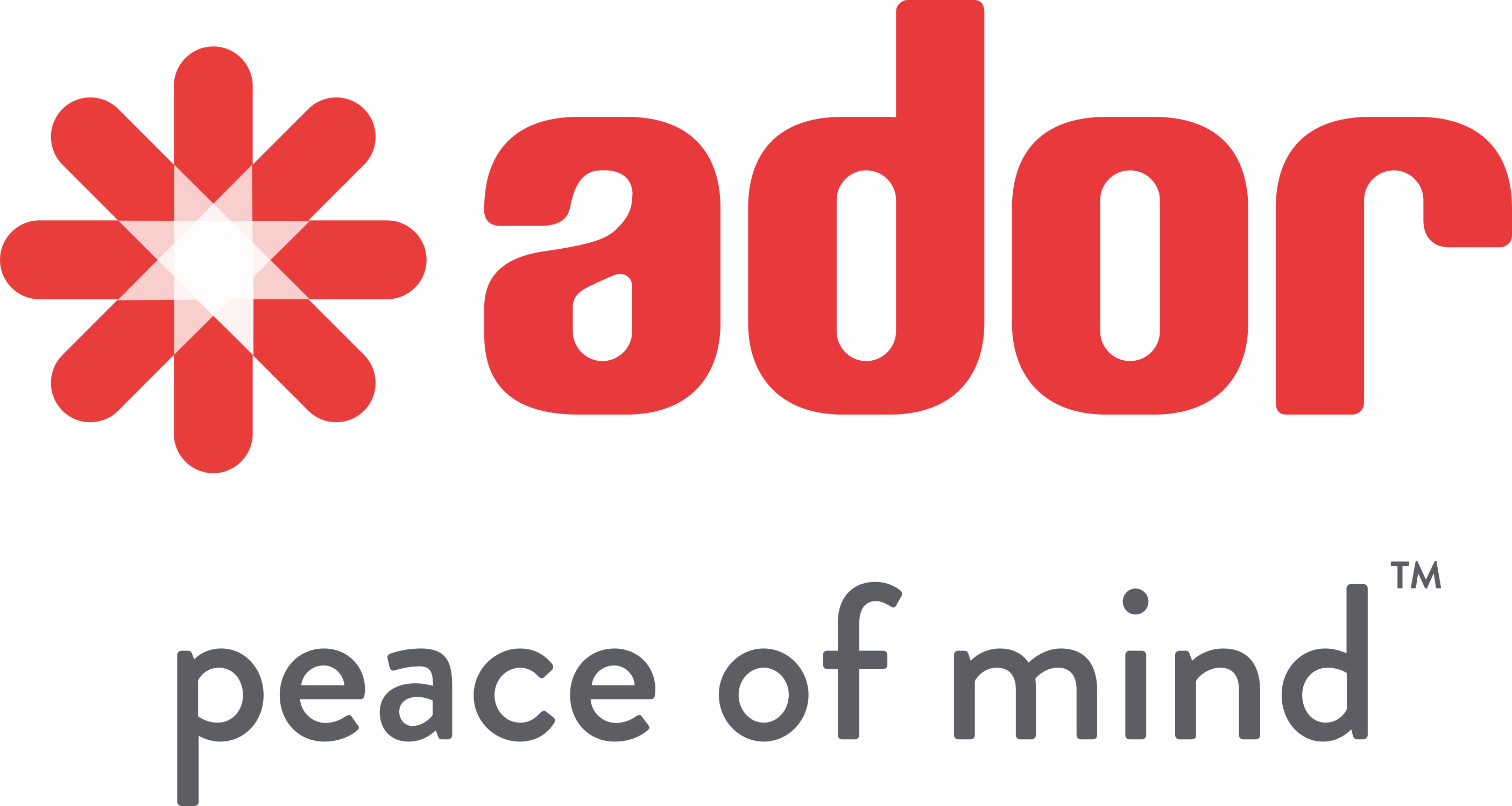
- "Creating the best welding experience"
- Type: Public
- Traded as: NSE: ADORWELD; BSE: 517041
- Industry: Manufacturing
- Founded: 1951
- Founder: JB Adwani
- Headquarters: Mumbai, India
- Area served: Pan India, Persian Gulf/Middle East, Southeast Asia and Africa.
- Key people: Mr. Aditya T. Malkani
- Products: Welding equipments, consumables, cutting products, CNC cutting machine, welding automation
- Services: Project engineering
- Revenue: $70M USD (2017)
- Number of employees: 862 (31 March 2025)
- Parent: Ador Group
- Website: www.adorwelding.com

Ador Welding Limited (formerly known as Adwani–Oerlikon Limited) is an industrial manufacturing company headquartered in Mumbai, India. The flagship company of the Ador Group, Ador Welding produces a variety of welding products, industry applications, and technology services, including welding consumables (electrodes, wires, and fluxes) as well as welding and cutting equipment. It has over 30% market share in the organized welding market and is considered one of the major players in the Indian welding industry. Ador PEB is the company's project engineering division. PEB is based in Pune and has provided services to the Indian Government's Bharat Nirman Program in the field of combustion and thermal engineering technologies.

== History ==
Ador Welding Limited was formerly known as JB Adwani & Co. and was founded in 1908 by five men, all originally from Karachi: Kanwalsing Malkani, Vasanmal Malakani, Jotsing Adwani, Bhagwansing Advani, and Gopaldas Mirchandani. In 1951 to meet India's growing demand for welding electrodes, JB Adwani & Co formed a joint venture with Oerlikon-Buhrle of Switzerland to manufacture them. The resulting company, Adwani–Oerlikon Ltd., helped build India's welding industry, which at the time was in its infancy.

In early 1970s, the company began expanding into other sectors in India, such as electronic equipment, metal reclamation for industrial components, energy services and cosmetics. During this decade, a separate entity, Ador Powertron, was established for manufacturing electronic power equipment. The 1970s also saw the formation of Ador Fontech, a company providing metal reclamation and surfacing services for industrial components. Within ten years, Ador Fontech had become the number two company after Larsen and Toubro in the metal reclamation sector.

In 1986 JB Adwani & Co launched an initial public offering and ceased to be the holding company of Adwani-Oerlikon Ltd. In 2003 the joint Adwani–Oerlikon association came to an end and the company changed to its current name Ador Welding Limited.

One of Ador Welding Ltd.'s Equipment plants

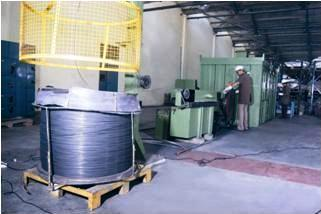
One of Ador Welding Ltd.'s Consumables plants

== Ador Welding PEB ==
Milestones

- 1989: Project Engineering Business got established
- 1994: Enlisted as LSTK contractor for Flare systems
- 1998: awarded ISO 9001 Certification for entire plant
- 1999: ventured on their own as Ador Technologies Ltd.
- 2001: Merged with Ador Welding Ltd as PEB – a division of AWL
- 2002: Registered in Oman for flare systems
- 2005: Awarded OHSAS 18001 Certification for entire plant
- 2007: Established Fabrication Unit for Process Equipment for Pressure Vessels, Heat Exchangers, Reactors
- 2008: Awarded ASME approval in "U", "R" and "NB" Stamp for Pressure Vessels, Heat Exchangers
- 2008: Registration in UAE for Flares
- 2011: Re-certification of ASME approval in "U" and "R"

== Facilities ==
- A distributor and sales network of over 125 outlets throughout India
- Four manufacturing units located in Silvassa, Coimbatore, Raipur, and Pune (India). (The units are ISO 9001:2000 certified for quality management systems and ISO 14001:2004 standard for environment management systems and are audited by NCC Abu Dhabi and PDO Oman.)
- Eleven area offices in India and one overseas office in Dubai (United Arab Emirates)
- Distributor bases in the Persian Gulf/Middle East, Southeast Asia and Africa
- Two Research and Development Centers in India at Pune and Silvassa
- The Ador Welding Academy (AWA) for training welders in welding techniques and procedures. The AWA (Formerly AIWT) has trained over 60,000 welders in India

== Leadership ==
The following are the key executives of the company as of 2011:

- N Malkani Nagpal, Director
- R A Mirchandani, Director
- A T Malkani, Director
- D A Lalvani, Director

== Clients ==
Ador Welding's services to clients have included:

- Providing welding service applications and consumables to the Navaratna Companies.
- Developing special electrodes for welding of the penstocks at the Bhakra Dam, as well as those at Hirakud, Nagarjuna Sagar, and Koyna.
- Assisting in the erection of plants and the introduction of rutile based electrodes and orbital welders for Bharat Heavy Electricals Limited, National Thermal Power Corporation, and Neyveli Lignite Corporation.
- Providing services for welding high-alloy austenitic materials, high-temperature materials and capillary tubes for Bhabha Atomic Research Centre, and nuclear power plants ar Kalpakkam, Narora, and Kaiga.
- Developing a high productivity welding process for Suzlon, NEPC Group, and Wescare (India) Limited.
- Providing technical know-how and consumables for the erection of plants at Bhilai, Salem, and Durgapur.
- Developing special welding applications and consumables for ONGC, GAIL, and Bharat Petroleum.
- Helping to set up the structure and mining process operations for Coal India, Nalco, Bharat Gold Mines, and Indian Rare Earths Limited.
- Providing technology and consumables for maintenance of worn out rail track points and crosses for Indian Railways.
