= Ador Group =

Indian multinational conglomerate

- Formerly: JB Advani Group
- Headquarters: Mumbai, India
- Subsidiaries: Ador Welding; Ador Fontech; Ador Multiproducts; Ador Powertron
- Website: adorgroup.com

The Ador Group is an Indian multinational conglomerate headquartered in Mumbai. Formerly known as JB Advani Group, it is one of the oldest and largest companies in the Indian industrial sector. They are a diversified group with core operations in engineering products and services. The group consists of five companies with interests in core industrial and manufacturing sectors, cosmetic products and green energy initiatives. Ador Group's flagship company is Ador Welding (earlier known as Advani Oerlikon Ltd). Two other listed entities Ador Fontech and Ador Multiproducts are into metal reclamation/surfacing solutions and personal care products, respectively. The unlisted entity Ador Powertron is an industrial electronics company based in Pune.

== Subsidiaries ==
=== Ador Welding ===
The Ador Group's primary subsidiary, Ador Welding, is an Indian manufacturer of welding and cutting equipment and consumables as well as related services. The company began in 1951 as Advani–Oerlikon Ltd., a joint venture with Swiss welding industry brand Oerlikon Ltd. It operates domestically and internationally in the Middle East, Africa, and South-East Asia.

=== Ador Powertron ===
Ador Powertron is an Indian industrial electronics company based in Pune and part of the Ador Group. It was started in 1977 as the Industrial Electronics and Power Control division (IEPC) of Advani Oerlikon Ltd. (now known as Ador Welding). It was established as an independent company in January 1995 and commenced business operations in April 1995.

The company manufactures, designs and commissions engineering products. Its customers come from sectors including the thermal power, iron and steel, cement, battery manufacturing, chemical and fertilizer, atomic energy, railway, telecom, and automobile industries.

== Partnership ==
Ador Group is partnered with Godrej Properties to develop a luxury housing project spread over almost seven acres in Mumbai.
