= Mark Bautista =

Filipino singer, TV host, model and dancer

- Born: Mark Arazo Bautista
- Origin: Cagayan de Oro, Misamis Oriental, Philippines
- Genres: Pop
- Occupations: Singer; TV host; model; dancer
- Instrument: Vocals
- Years active: 2002–present
- Label: VIVA Records
- Website: markbautista.com

Mark Arazo Bautista is a Filipino singer, TV host, model and dancer. Bautista received his career break when he became a grand finalist on the Philippine reality TV talent search Star for a Night where he placed third behind Sarah Geronimo.

== Career ==
=== 2003–2009 ===
In 2004, he signed a contract with ABS-CBN, becoming a regular performer in ASAP and host of the Search for the Star in a Million (season 1 and season 2) singing competition as well as Star Magic.

In September 2005, he released his first album Dream On with its carrier single "I Need You" which topped the MYX daily top 10 for two months. Viva Records released a full-length album called Dream On Expanded along with the release of the "You Win the Game" music video that featured a new and daring Mark. The song reached the top spot in MYX in less than a week after it premiered.

On March 24, 2006, Bautista had his first solo major concert at the Aliw Theater, dubbed as 'Pop Heartthrob'.

=== 2010–2013 ===
In 2010, he signed a four-year contract with GMA Network. He became a regular performer on Party Pilipinas, made a cameo appearance in Diva and had a lead role in a primetime drama series.

In July 2011, he, along with other Kapuso artists performed for the Kababayan Fest held in Northern and Southern California. In the same year, he performed as Crisóstomo Ibarra in the stage musical Noli Me Tángere, an adaptation of José Rizal's novel of the same name by composer Ryan Cayabyab and librettist Bienvenido Lumbera.

In 2014, Bautista performed in the musical Here Lies Love by David Byrne and Fatboy Slim at the Royal National Theatre in London where he played the late President Ferdinand Marcos. The musical is based on the life of Imelda Marcos.

=== 2018–2019 ===
Bautista returned to GMA Network as one of the performers of a new musical variety show, Studio 7.

== Personal life ==
Through his self-authored memoir titled Beyond the Mark, Bautista opened up about the challenges he experienced after revealing in February 2018 that he is bisexual.

In January 2023, he opened his coffee shop business in Cagayan de Oro City.

== Discography ==
=== Albums ===
Year	Title	Certifications	Sales
2004	Mark Bautista: Studio album; Released: 2003	PHL: Gold	15,000+
2005	Dream On Expanded^{[A]}: Studio album; Released: January 2006	PHL: Gold	15,000+
2007	Every Now and Then: Studio album; Released: April 27, 2007	PHL: Gold	15,000+
2008	I'll Be the One: Studio album; Released: August 15, 2008	-	10,000+
2010	Nagmamahal, Mark Bautista: Studio album; Released: October 16, 2010	-	10,000+
2013	The Sound of Love: Studio album; Released: June 1, 2013	-	

Notes

- A Dream On Expanded was first released as a six-track EP on September 13, 2005, entitled Dream On, before it was re-released as a studio album.

=== Singles ===
Year	Title	Album
2003	"Baliw"	Mark Bautista
2004	"Ako'y Maghihintay" (with Sarah Geronimo)	Mark Bautista
2004	"Another Chance"	Mark Bautista
2004	"Lahat sa Buhay Ko"	Mark Bautista
2005	"I Need You"	Dream On Expanded
2005	"You Win the Game"	Dream On Expanded
2006	"And by Now"	Dream On Expanded
2007	"Break It to Me Gently"	Every Now and Then
2008	"Eternally"	I'll Be the One
2009	"Sana'y Dinggin Mo"	I'll Be the One
2010	"Kahit May Mahal Ka Ng Iba"	Nagmamahal, Mark Bautista
2011	"Bakit"	Nagmamahal, Mark Bautista
2012	"Next to You"	Nagmamahal, Mark Bautista
2013	"Bato Sa Buhangin"	The Sound of Love
2013	"That's All"	The Sound of Love

=== Guest appearances ===
Year	Song	Album
2003	"Broken Vow" (Sarah Geronimo with Mark Bautista)	Popstar: A Dream Come True
2004	"Kay Gandang Umaga" (Sarah Geronimo with Mark Bautista)	Sweet Sixteen
2005	"Pang-Romansang Espesyal" (Salbakuta with Mark Bautista)	Pang-Romansang Espesyal
2005	"I Finally Found Someone" (Live) (Sarah Geronimo with Mark Bautista)	The Other Side: Live Album
2005	"Window of My Heart" (Rachelle Ann Go with Mark Bautista)	I Care
2007	"Time to Let Go" (Sarah Geronimo feat. Mark Bautista)	Taking Flight

=== Other appearances ===
Year	Song	Album
2003	"Ngayon at Kailanman"	Star for a Night
2003	"O Holy Night"	A Viva Popstars Christmas
2003	"Christmas Won't Be the Same Without You" (with Sarah Geronimo)	A Viva Popstars Christmas
2003	"Awit ng Pabo at Loro" (with Sarah Geronimo)	Lagi Kitang Mamahalin
2004	"Ngayon at Kailanman" (Live)	Night of the Champions
2004	"Broken Vow" (Live) (Sarah Geronimo with Mark Bautista)	Night of the Champions
2004	"How Did You Know" (Live)	Night of the Champions
2005	"Another Chance" (Live)	Return of the Champions
2005	"Ako'y Maghihintay" (Live) (with Sarah Geronimo)	Return of the Champions
2005	"Lahat sa Buhay Ko" (Live)	Return of the Champions
2005	"Search for the Star in a Million" (Theme) (with Sarah Geronimo, Erik Santos and Christian Bautista)	Search for the Star in a Million
2006	"Beh Buti Nga" (feat. Anne Curtis)	Hotsilog: The ASAP Hotdog Compilation

== Filmography ==
=== Film ===
Year	Title	Role	Notes
2004	Annie B.	Mark	
2004	Masikip sa Dibdib	Singer	Cameo
2004	Lastikman: Unang Banat	Lastikman/Adrian Rosales	
2007	Paano Kita Iibigin	Raffy	
2008	Baler	Lope Balbiena	
2009	Status: Single		
2009	Sundo	Baste	
2009	Kimmy Dora	Doctor	Cameo
2012	Of All the Things	Eps	supporting cast
2016	Lumayo Ka Nga Sa Akin	Himself/Singer	
2018	Abay Babes	Boy Giling	

=== Television ===
Year	Title	Role	Notes
2002	Star for a Night	Himself	1st runner-up to Grand Champion Sarah Geronimo
2003	SOP	Himself	Guest performer
2003	Search for a Star	Himself	Field reporter
2003	Sarah the Teen Princess	Baste Di Magiba	Main role
2004–2010	ASAP	Himself	Co-host/Performer
2004	Maalaala Mo Kaya	Himself	Episode "Barya"
2005	Wansapanataym	Himself	Episode "Sayaw ni Kikay"
2005	Kampanerang Kuba	Repus Akach	Recurring role (his character name came from twisted "Super Chaka")
2005	Maalaala Mo Kaya	Louie	Episode "Panyo"
2006	Maalaala Mo Kaya	Roger	Episode "Radyo"
2006	Your Song	Jessie Hipolito	Episode "Forever's Not Enough"
2007	Sana Maulit Muli	Francis Marquez	Recurring role
2007	Maalaala Mo Kaya	Vic/Mie Mie Barcelona	Episode "The Mie Mie Barcelona Story"
2008	Maalaala Mo Kaya	Bugoy Drilon	Episode "Kalabaw"
2009–2010	May Bukas Pa	Victorio/Choir Member	Chapter 16: Hope/Final Chapter: Amen
2010–2013	Party Pilipinas	Co-host/Performer	
2010	Diva	Himself	Cameo appearance
2010	Pilyang Kerubin	Arcanghel Gabriel	
2010	Wish Ko Lang	Himself	Guest
2011	Dwarfina	Estong	Guest Cast
2012	Legacy	Eboy	Supporting cast
2012	Charice: One for the Heart	Himself	Guest performer
2012	Chef Boy Logro: Kusina Master	Himself	Guest
2012–2013	Yesterday's Bride	Dave Serrano	Supporting role
2013–2015	Sunday All Stars	Himself	Co-host/Performer
2015	Magpakailanman: The Roland "Bunot" Abante Story	Roland " Bunot" Abante	
2015	Gandang Gabi Vice!	Himself	with Sheryn Regis
2015	Ipaglaban Mo: Sinamantalang Kahinaan	Gener	
2015	StarStruck	Himself	Guest performer
2015	Wansapanataym: Kenny Kaliwete	Allister/Black Shadow	
2016	Sunday PinaSaya	Himself	Guest
2016	Lip Sync Battle Philippines	Himself	with Christian Bautista
2016	Just Duet	Himself	Guest
2018–2019	Studio 7	Himself	Host
2020	Chika, Besh!	Himself	Guest
2020–present	All-Out Sundays	Himself	Performer
2023–present	It's Showtime	Himself	Guest performer
2026	Rainbow Rumble	Himself	Contestant

== Awards and nominations ==
Year	Award giving body	Category	Nominated work	Results
2006	MYX Music Awards	Favorite Remake	"I Need You"	Won
2006	MYX Music Awards	Favorite Male Artist	—N/a	Nominated
2008	Awit Awards	Best Regional Recording	"Matud Nila"	Won
