= Lastikman: Unang Banat =

- DVD Cover
- Directed by: Mac Alejandre
- Screenplay by: R.J. Nuevas
- Story by: Wali Ching; R.J. Nuevas
- Based on: Lastikman by Mars Ravelo
- Produced by: Vicente G. Del Rosario III; Veronique Del Rosario-Corpus
- Starring: Mark Bautista; Sarah Geronimo; Cherie Gil; John Estrada; Danilo Barrios; Elizabeth Oropesa; Joel Torre; Mark Gil; Bearwin Meily; Tuesday Vargas; Mikel Campos
- Cinematography: Regieben Romana
- Edited by: Kelly M. Cruz
- Music by: Ogie Alcasid; Gerdie Francisco
- Distributed by: Viva Films
- Release date: December 25, 2004
- Running time: 120 minutes
- Country: Philippines
- Language: Filipino
- Box office: ₱24.5 million (Official 2004 MMFF run)

Mars Ravelo's Lastikman: Unang Banat (lit. 'Mars Ravelo's Lastikman: The First Stretch'), or simply Lastikman: Unang Banat, is a 2004 Philippine superhero film based on the comic book character Lastikman, directed by Mac Alejandre and written by RJ Nuevas. It stars Mark Bautista, Sarah Geronimo, Cherie Gil, John Estrada, Danilo Barrios, Elizabeth Oropesa, Joel Torre, Mark Gil, Bearwin Meily, and Tuesday Vargas. The film was released through Viva Films on December 25, 2004, as part of the 30th Metro Manila Film Festival.

== Plot ==
Adrian is an ordinary boy who lacks skills and talents. He likes his friend Lara, but is often bullied by his classmates. Despite being a weakling, Adrian possesses a pure and brave heart when he tries to fight illegal loggers who try and cut down an enchanted rubber tree. Unfortunately, he is beaten by the loggers and left almost half dead. But because of his pure personality, the enchanted rubber tree that he saves heals him and grants him powers that transform him into a super hero named Lastikman who can stretch his body at incredible distance and transform into different objects. After a series of exploits, he, his family and Lara move to Manila, while his alcoholic father, Pablo, quits drinking after seeing Adrian stretch himself, thinking that he is hallucinating from his addiction.

On the other hand, the tree also gives powers to Editha, a single mother who lost her children in a witch-hunt after being falsely accused of being an aswang, granting her the same powers as Lastikman, as well as shapeshifting powers and carnivorous tentacles that grow on her back. Assuming the identity Lastika, she takes revenge on her tormentors and moves to Manila, where she commits multiple crimes and unsuccessfully tries to entice Lastikman to join her in her bid for world domination after saving him from a Werewolf. It is revealed that there are actually two werewolves composed of father and son duo Alfonso and Reden, who happens to be Adrian's employer. Alfonso is later caught and killed by angry city-dwellers, prompting Reden to take revenge by uncovering Lastikman's true identity and badly mauling Adrian's father, Pablo, who is hospitalized.

Lastika disguises herself as Lastikman and engages in a shooting spree in the streets to destroy his reputation. At the hospital, Adrian and his family watch the commotion on television. On his deathbed, Pablo hints to Adrian that he knows about his superhero identity and urges him to fight Lastika before succumbing to his wounds. Lastikman then confronts Lastika and exposes her before engaging her in a running battle across Metro Manila, culminating with Lastika briefly strangling Lara, who happens to be passing by. Lastika initially overpowers Lastikman and throws him into a crate of wine, which spills into Lastika's feet, but Lastikman pulls out a live wire and sets the spilled wine on fire, incinerating her. Lara realizes that Lastikman and Adrian are the same person and the movie ends with them becoming a couple.

== Cast ==
=== Main cast ===
- Mark Bautista as Adrian Rosales / Lastikman
- Sarah Geronimo as Lara Manuel

=== Supporting cast ===
- Cherie Gil as Editha / Lastika
- John Estrada as Alfonso
- Danilo Barrios as Reden
- Joel Torre as Pablo
- Bearwin Meily as Garoy
- John Manalo as Butil
- Elizabeth Oropesa as Susan
- Tuesday Vargas as Maritess
- Mark Gil as Andrew
- Vangie Labalan as Delia
- Athena Tibi as Christy
- Kristel Fulgar as Letlet
- Saver as Asong Itim ("Black Dog")
- Rosauro "Boy" Roque as Taong Aso
- Bobby Andrews as Adan
- Marky Lopez as Joko
- Vanna Garcia as Anna
- Ella V. as Gelay
- Miles Ocampo as Young Lara
- Crystal Moreno as Lara's stepsister
- JC Parker as a sexy werewolf victim (cameo)
- Isabella De Leon as a child werewolf victim (cameo)
- Mikel Campos as Benjie

== Accolades ==
Year	Award-Giving Body	Category	Recipient	Result
2004	Metro Manila Film Festival	Best Visual Effects	Fel Rodolfo	Won
