= Galo Ador Jr. =

Filipino comic book author

- Born: Galo T. Ador Jr. September 1, 1969; Manila, Philippines
- Died: March 10, 2008 (aged 39); Quezon City, Philippines
- Resting place: Quezon City
- Other names: Galo Jr.
- Occupations: Writer, script supervisor, comics owner

Galo Ador Jr. (September 1, 1969 – March 10, 2008) was a comic book author of Filipino descent.

== Early life ==
Born Galo T. Ador Jr. on September 1, 1969, in Manila, Philippines. He was the son of Galo Ador Sr.

== Career ==
Galo was active in comics in the '90s until Graphic Arts Service shut down, causing him to move to TV writing. Galo is best known as a TV writer who worked on Francisco V. Coching's Pedro Penduko, Alpha Omega Girl, Kapitan Aksiyon, Agent X44, and many more during the last couple of years.

Galo is one of the founders of Back Door Publishing, an independent comic book company that released Dark Pages in 2002.

== Filmography ==
=== Writer ===
Year	Title
2004	Maalaala Mo Kaya: Kutsilyo
2006	Agua Bendita
2006	Kapitan Aksiyon
2006	Alpha Omega Girl
2007	Agent X44
2007	Pedro Penduko at ang Mga Engkantao

=== Story and screenplay ===
Year	Title
2005	Happily Ever After

=== Script supervisor ===
Year	Title
2007	The Man in the Lighthouse
