= Mac Alejandre =

Filipino film and television director (born 1972)

- Born: McArthur C. Alejandre; August 13, 1972 (age 53)
- Occupation: Director
- Years active: 1995–present

McArthur C. Alejandre (born December 8, 1972) is a Filipino film and television director, as well as the head of TV5's artist management division Talent5 (TV5 Talent Center, now Star Worx).

== Filmography ==
=== Featured films ===
Year	Title	Ref.
1995	Campus Girls	
1995	Okey si Ma'am	
1996	Habang May Buhay	
1997	Dahil Tanging Ikaw	
1997	Isang Tanong Isang Sagot	
1997	Wala Na Bang Pag Ibig?	
1998	Ikaw Na Sana	
1998	Ang Lahat ng Ito'y para Sa'yo	
1999	Ikaw Lamang	
2003	Sukdulan	
2003	Liberated	
2003	Captain Barbell	
2004	Singles	
2004	Liberated 2	
2004	Lastikman: Unang Banat	
2005	Let the Love Begin	
2005	Say That You Love Me	
2005	Hari ng Sablay	
2006	I Will Always Love You	
2008	One True Love	
2009	Ang Panday	
2010	In Your Eyes	
2011	Ang Panday 2	
2012	Just One Summer	
2019	The Annulment	
2021	My Husband, My Lover	
2022	Eyes on Fire	
2022	May-December-January	
2023	Call Me Alma	
2024	Isang Gabi	

=== Television ===
- Ikaw na Sana (1997–1998)
- Click (1999)
- Joyride (2004)
- Mukha (2005)
- Darna (2005)
- Ganti (2005)
- Agos (2005)
- Majika (2006)
- Duyan (2006)
- Linlang (2006)
- Dangal (2006)
- Now and Forever (2005–2006)
- Muli (2007)
- Sine Novela: Kung Mahawi Man ang Ulap (2007)
- Asian Treasures (2007, assistant-director)
- Marimar (2007–2008)
- Joaquin Bordado (2008)
- Tasya Fantasya (2008)
- Totoy Bato (2009)
- All About Eve (2009)
- All My Life (2009)
- Stairway to Heaven (2009)
- The Last Prince (2010)
- Endless Love (2010)
- Alakdana (2011)
- Amaya (2011–2012)
- Nandito Ako (2012)
- Never Say Goodbye (2013)
- For Love or Money (2013–2014)
- Baker King (2015)
- Ang Panday (2016)
- 'Wag Mong Agawin ang Akin (2022)
- I Love You Since 1892 (2025–2026)

== Awards and nominations ==
Year	Award-Giving Body	Category	Work	Result	Ref.
2008	38th Box Office Entertainment Awards	Most Popular TV Director/s (with Joyce Bernal)	MariMar	Won	
2011	60th FAMAS Awards	Best Director	Ang Panday 2	Nominated	
2020	46th Metro Manila Film Festival	Best Director	Tagpuan	Nominated	
