= Karylle discography =

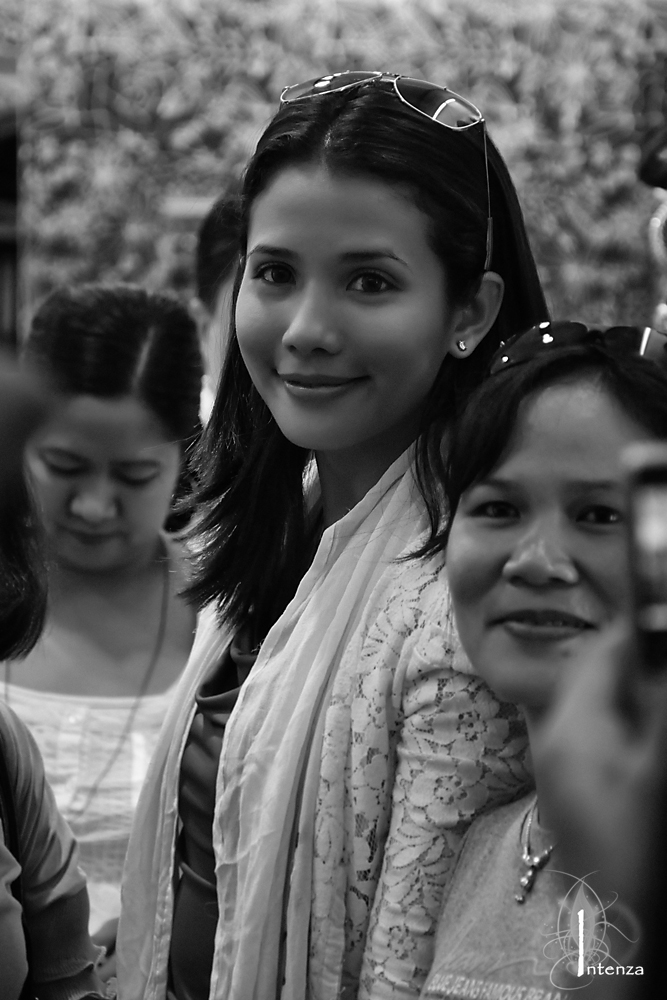
- Karylle in 2010
- Studio albums: 6
- Compilation albums: 1

Filipina singer-songwriter Karylle has released six studio albums, one compilation album, twenty-nine singles (including two as a featured artist) and has been involved in several soundtrack recordings. She made her musical debut in 2001 with the studio album Time to Shine, which was a critical and commercial success. It has been certified Gold by Philippine Association of the Record Industry, denoting 20,000 copies sold in the Philippines. The singer's second studio album, You Make Me Sing, was released in 2005.

In 2009, Karylle's third studio album, Time For Letting Go, was released under PolyEast Records. It has been certified Platinum by PARI for selling over 25,000 copies in the country. In 2011, she released her fourth studio-album, Roadtrip. The album went Gold a few months later, selling nearly 10,000 units in the country. In October 2013, she released her fifth studio-album, K, and was also certified Gold by PARI. Her sixth studio album, entitled A Different Playground, was released in late 2015. In April 2020, Karylle released The Holy Rosary: Roses for Mary, a spoken word recording of rosary-based prayers, which also included two religious songs.

== Albums ==
=== Studio albums ===
List of studio albums, with selected details and certifications
Title	Album details	Certifications
Time to Shine	Released: June 5, 2001; Label: Universal Records; Formats: CD, cassette, digital download	PARI: Gold
You Make Me Sing	Released: 2005; Label: Universal Records; Formats: CD, cassette, digital download	—
Time for Letting Go	Released: 2009; Label: PolyEast Records; Formats: CD, digital download	PARI: Platinum
Roadtrip	Released: 2011; Label: PolyEast Records; Formats: CD, digital download	PARI: Platinum
K	Released: November 7, 2013; Label: PolyEast Records; Formats: CD, digital download	PARI: Gold
A Different Playground	Released: November 9, 2015; Label: PolyEast Records; Formats: CD, digital download, streaming	—

=== Compilation albums ===
List of compilation albums, with selected details
Title	Album details
The Karylle Songbook	Released: June 8, 2015; Label: Universal Records; Formats: CD, digital download, streaming

== Singles ==
=== As lead artist ===
List of singles as lead artist, showing year released, and associated albums
Title	Year	Album
"Can't Live Without You"	2001	Time to Shine
"Calling" (with Gil Ofarim)	2001	Time to Shine
"Pagbigyan ang Puso" (with Jerome John Hughes)	2004	Mano Po III: My Love (Original Motion Picture Soundtrack)
"You Make Me Sing"	2005	You Make Me Sing
"Hiling"	2005	You Make Me Sing
"I'll Never Get Over You"	2009	Time for Letting Go
"Almost Over You"	2009	Time for Letting Go
"OMG"	2011	Roadtrip
"Basically"	2011	Roadtrip
"Found My Smile Again"	2012	Roadtrip
"Sa'Yo Na Lang Ako"	2013	Philpop 2013 and K
"Kiss You"	2014	K
"Kapiling Kita"	2014	K
"Can't Shut Up"	2015	A Different Playground
"Paano Ko Tuturuan Ang Puso"	2015	A Different Playground
"Half a Million"	2016	A Different Playground
"Akay" (featuring Child Haus Kids)	2016	Non-album single
"Baliktanaw"	2017	A Different Playground
"Iloveya"	2018	Non-album singles
"Under the Lights"	2018	Non-album singles
"It's Christmas Time" (featuring Calvin Jeremy)	2018	Non-album singles
"Christmas in the Tropics"	2018	Non-album singles
"Simula"	2019	Non-album singles
"Wake Up Next To You"	2021	B&B: The Story of the Battle of Brody & Brandy (The Original Soundtrack)
"Kababaihan"	2022	Non-album singles
"Fine"	2022	Non-album singles
"MT"	2024	Non-album singles

=== As featured artist ===
List of singles as featured artist, showing year released, and associated albums
Title	Year	Album
"Promises" (Sponge Cola featuring Karylle)	2019	Sea of Lights
"Toxic Free" (DJ M.O.D and Vice Ganda featuring Karylle)	2021	Non-album single

== Other appearances ==
Title	Year	Album
"Sana'y Maghintay ang Walang Hanggan" (with Jerome John Hughes)	2006	Moments of Love (Original Motion Picture Soundtrack)
"I Remember the Boy"	2009	All About Joey
"The Best of Me" (Martin Nievera featuring Karylle)	2010	Duets in Harmony
"It Must Have Been Love"	2011	Kris Aquino: My Heart's Journey
"Boom Boom Pow/Free Your Mind" (with the cast of The Kitchen Musical)	2012	The Kitchen Musical (The Soundtrack)
"Every Breath You Take" (with the cast of The Kitchen Musical)	2012	The Kitchen Musical (The Soundtrack)
"Unwell" (with Art Acuña)	2012	The Kitchen Musical (The Soundtrack)
"Hot N' Cold" (with Stephen Rahman-Hughes)	2012	The Kitchen Musical (The Soundtrack)
"S.O.S." (with the cast of The Kitchen Musical)	2012	The Kitchen Musical (The Soundtrack)
"Freedom" (with the cast of The Kitchen Musical)	2012	The Kitchen Musical (The Soundtrack)
"Nobody" (with the cast of The Kitchen Musical)	2012	The Kitchen Musical (The Soundtrack)
"Hurts so Bad" (Young JV featuring Karylle)	2012	Doin' It Big
"After All" (Christian Bautista featuring Karylle)	2014	Soundtrack
"Sabay Tayo" (with Sponge Cola and Frank Magalona)	2016	Sinag Tala
"Circle of Life" (with Zsa Zsa Padilla, Piolo Pascual, and Iñigo Pascual)	2019	Non-album single
"Let They Will Be Done"	2020	The Holy Rosary: Roses for Mary
"Shelter Me, O God"	2020	The Holy Rosary: Roses for Mary
"Ashtis of Manila"	2021	B&B: The Story of the Battle of Brody & Brandy (The Original Soundtrack)
"Ani ng Sining, Bayang Malikhain" (with Yael Yuzon featuring Centro Escolar University Singers-Manila)	2024	Non-album single
