= YJV =

EP by Young JV
- Released: June 15, 2015
- Recorded: 2012–2015
- Genre: Pop, acoustic, OPM, R&B, hip hop
- Length: 19:39
- Language: English, Filipino, Tagalog
- Label: Star Recording, Inc.
- Producer: Malou N. Santos (executive); Roxy Liquigan(executive); EAK of DOIN' IT BIG Productions Inc.(executive)

Young JV chronology
| Doin' It Big (2012) | YJV (2015) |

Singles from YJV
- 1. "Ale" Released: March 14, 2015; 2. "Flashback" Released: October 22, 2015; 3. "Got To Have You" Released: February 2016

YJV is the first extended play and third overall release by Filipino artist Young JV, released on June 15, 2015, under Star Records.

The EP re-featured the Hurts So Bad part of his second effort in 2012.

== Track listing ==
| No. | Title | Writer(s) | Arranger(s), Producer(s) | Length |
|---|---|---|---|---|
| 1. | "Ale" | Young JV | | 3:21 |
| 2. | "Flashback" (featuring Emmanuelle) | | | 3:28 |
| 3. | "Mismo Baby" (featuring KZ Tandingan) | | | 3:44 |
| 4. | "Hurts So Bad" (featuring Karylle) | J. Marcelo, E. Kapunan, K. Tatlonghari | Jungee Marcelo, Jungee Marcelo and Bojam | 4:39 |
| 5. | "Got To Have You" | | | 3:27 |
| Total length: | | | | 19:39 |

== Single ==
"Ale" was the first released single from the album. It managed to enter Pinoy Myx Countdown but peaked not higher than 19 spot.

"Flashback" is the second single from the album, released on October 22, 2015. It was launched on MOR 99.1 radio station and its music video is premiered on Myx Philippines on the 23rd.
