= Bukas na Lang Kita Mamahalin =

- Title card
- Genre: Drama
- Created by: ABS-CBN Studios
- Written by: Philip T. King; Joel Mercado; Emille Joson
- Directed by: Jerome C. Pobocan; Trina N. Dayrit; Jon S. Villarin
- Starring: Gerald Anderson; Dawn Zulueta; Cristine Reyes; Diana Zubiri; Rayver Cruz; Tonton Gutierrez; Dina Bonnevie
- Theme music composer: Jessie Lasaten
- Opening theme: "Bukas na Lang Kita Mamahalin" by Jed Madela
- Country of origin: Philippines
- Original language: Tagalog
- No. of episodes: 55 (list of episodes)

Production
- Executive producers: Carlo Katigbak; Cory Vidanes; Laurenti Dyogi; Roldeo Endrinal
- Producer: Maya Manuel-Aralar
- Running time: 45 minutes
- Production company: Dreamscape Entertainment Television

Original release
- Network: ABS-CBN Studios
- Release: September 2 – November 15, 2013

Bukas na Lang Kita Mamahalin (International title: Tomorrow Can Wait / transl. I'll Love You Tomorrow Instead) is a 2013 Philippine television drama series broadcast by ABS-CBN. Directed by Jerome C. Pobocan, Trina N. Dayrit and Jon S. Villarin, it stars Gerald Anderson, Dawn Zulueta, Cristine Reyes, Diana Zubiri, Rayver Cruz, Tonton Gutierrez and Dina Bonnevie. It aired on the network's Primetime Bida line up and worldwide on TFC from September 2 to November 15, 2013, replacing That Winter, the Wind Blows and was replaced by When a Man Falls in Love.

== Synopsis ==
The story revolves around a tormented son, Miguel, because of the tragic incident that happened to his father who was wrongfully convicted of a crime he did not commit; the murder of a senator whom he befriended, and died after a rumble inside the prison. As he grows up into a trouble-prone young man, the trauma of the past haunts him in the present when he is accused as one of the suspects in a rape case. Having put in the same situation, he believes that he will not end up like his father who never had a chance to prove his innocence. On his ultimate journey in finding justice for his case with the help of his beloved mother, he coincidentally discovers the means that can clear his father's name and the truth behind the co-existence of their fates. It is the story of seeking justice against all odds and laws.

== Cast and characters ==
=== Main cast ===
- Gerald Anderson as Miguel Dizon
  - Dale Baldillo as young Miguel

A trouble-prone young man traumatized by the tragic death of his father, who died in a prison riot after being wrongfully convicted of murdering a politician and his mother find themselves targeted by a controversial criminal case and must fight to prove his innocence.

- Dawn Zulueta as Zenaida Dizon-Ramirez

Left to mourn and help her son, Miguel, navigate their grief while relentlessly fighting to clear Martin's name and uncover the real culprits behind the conspiracy.

- Cristine Reyes as Amanda Suarez-Dizon/Sophia
  - Andrea Brillantes as young Amanda

She is a resilient woman with a strong sense of justice, whose story is closely connected to the show's legal and crime-drama themes, including false accusations, murder trials, and prison rehabilitation.

- Diana Zubiri as Carla Melendez

In a bid to find the truth, Miguel hides Carla to protect her after an attempt is made on her life by the real mastermind, Melchor Antonio. This alliance eventually helps expose the real perpetrators and clear Miguel's name.

- Rayver Cruz as Marcus Ramirez
  - Nathaniel Britt as young Marcus

She is son of corrupt politician named my mother Victoria indeed the true perpetrator who assaulted Carla. To protect Marcus and his family's reputation, his influential family and their cohort, my grandfather Melchor, orchestrate a massive cover-up. They falsely accuse and frame Miguel for the crime, leading to Miguel's wrongful imprisonment.

- Tonton Gutierrez as Richard Ramirez

He is the biological father of both Miguel and Marcus and his late husband of Zenaida and former ex husband named Victoria

- Dina Bonnevie as Victoria Antonio

She climbs her way up the political ladder through corrupt means, serving as a former Congresswoman before ascending to the position of Senator and the ex-wife of Richard and biological mother of Marcus.

=== Supporting cast ===
- Lito Legaspi as Melchor Antonio
- Rey "PJ" Abellana as Jimmy Suarez
- Rommel Padilla as Raul Gimeno

He is introduced as a former cop involved in deep-seated cover-ups and institutional corruption. His history links him to the central legal battle regarding a high-profile assault and rape case. The plot thickens within a matter of days as Carla’s narrative intersects with powerful politicians, including a corrupt congressman and influential government figures, exposing how easily the justice system can be manipulated to protect elite perpetrators.

- Thou Reyes as Joaquin Bernal

Miguel's serves as the loyal, reliable best friend and right-hand man.

- Franco Daza as Alex Baldemor
- Madeleine Nicolas as Lumen Melendez
- Nico Antonio as John Boy Sanchez
- Vince Angeles as Gabby
- Justin Cuyugan as Armando Angeles
- Janus del Prado as Elvis

=== Guest cast ===
- Gabby Concepcion as Martin Dizon

Zenaida's husband, is wrongfully convicted of a crime he did not commit and is subsequently killed inside prison.

- Noel Trinidad as Sen. Renato Angeles
- Dindo Arroyo as Jomar
- Jong Cuenco as Atty. Orosco
- Rubi Rubi as Lydia Bernal
- Maritess Joaquin as Tessie
- Dominic Ochoa as Ramon Vilchez
- Ramon Christopher as Roland Reyes
- Michael Flores as Hudas
- Ronnie Lazaro as Benjie
- Jose Sarasola as Jessie
- Nanding Josef as Fernando Adanza
- Simon Ibarra as Tomas
- Jordan Castillo
- Benjamin de Guzman as Bart
- Alexandra Macanan as Gimeno's daughter
- Gilleth Sandico as Gimeno's wife
- Marina Benipayo as Jessica Tuazon
- Menggie Cobarrubias
- Manuel Chua

== Episodes ==
Month	Episodes	Peak	Average Rating	Rank
September 2013	21	14.8% (Pilot Episode)	11.9%	—N/a
October 2013	23	14.1% (Episode 24)	12.6%	—N/a
November 2013	11	15.4% (Finale Episode)	12.7%	—N/a

== Reception ==
KANTAR MEDIA NATIONAL TV RATINGS (10:00PM PST)
PILOT EPISODE	FINALE EPISODE	PEAK	AVERAGE	SOURCE
14.8%	15.4%	15.4%	12.4%	

== Reruns ==
The show began airing reruns on Jeepney TV from August 23 to September 24, 2021; October 14 to November 22, 2024; April 7 to May 16, 2025 and August 24 to November 6, 2026.

== See also ==
- List of programs broadcast by ABS-CBN
- List of ABS-CBN Studios original drama series
- List of programs broadcast by Jeepney TV
