= Palad =

Palad may refer to:

- Bukas Palad Music Ministry (literally meaning Open Palm Music Ministry in English) is a Roman Catholic community of young people who compose, record, and perform original Filipino religious music.
- Gulong ng Palad (Wheel of Fortune) is a Philippine 50's radio drama series and 1980s soap opera hit.
