= Bukas Palad Music Ministry =

Philippine musical group

- Choir
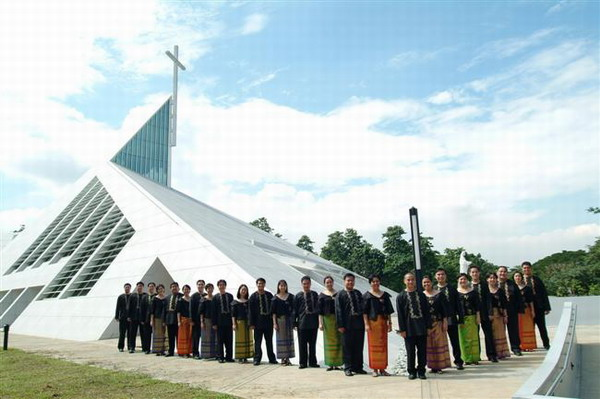
- The Bukas Palad Music Ministry on the steps of the Church of the Gesù at Ateneo de Manila University in Quezon City.
- Also known as: Bukas Palad
- Origin: Quezon City, Philippines
- Founded: June 7, 1986
- Founder: Manoling Francisco
- Genre: Choral music
- Headquarters: Ateneo de Manila University
- Website: Official website

The Bukas Palad Music Ministry (Filipino for "generous"; literally, "open palm") is a Roman Catholic, contemporary worship musical group in the Philippines that composes, records, and performs original religious music. Since 1986, Bukas Palad has recorded over a dozen albums with the Jesuit Music Ministry of Jesuit Communications Foundation, a ministry of the Philippine Province of the Society of Jesus, based in Ateneo de Manila University. The group has performed in over a hundred solo concerts across the country and overseas in Japan, Hong Kong, the United States, and Canada.

== History ==
Norman Agatep, Jandi Arboleda, and Rev Fr. Manoling Francisco SJ began writing liturgical songs as high school students. Their songs were eventually popularised through use in Catholic Masses and other liturgical services nationwide.

After Francisco joined the Society of Jesus in 1986, Agatep and Arboleda gathered some friends to sing at a wedding. This group continued singing and soon recorded their first album of original songs, entitled "Bukas Palad", which also became the group's name.

== Music ==
Bukas Palad has produced well over a hundred original liturgical and inspirational songs composed by Agatep, Arboleda, Francisco, and other members, as well as setting text to music like various Biblical passages and religious poems. Very few of Bukas Palad's members received formal musical training, yet over the years they have become a significant force in the Filipino music industry.

The group has also written hymns popular in the Philippines, such as "Hindî Kitá Malílimutan" ("I Will Not Forget You"), "Tanging Yaman" ("Only Treasure"), "Sa 'Yo Lamang" ("Only Yours"), "Anima Christi", "Humayo't Ihayág" ("Go Forth and Proclaim") and "I Will Sing Forever". Many of their musical settings for portions of the Mass, such as the Gloria, the Lord's Prayer, and the Agnus Dei, are popular throughout the country. Popular Filipino artists like Lea Salonga, Regine Velasquez, Gary Valenciano, Basil Valdez, Jamie Rivera, Joey Albert, Cooky Chua, and Noel Cabangon have also covered and popularised the group's songs.

Bukas Palad has been featured in various media including radio, television, and film. Bukas Palad pieces have become theme songs and spawned films and television shows, such as the film Tanging Yaman and the 2010 series, and the 2010 film Sa 'Yo Lamang.

The group conducts liturgical music workshops for parish communities and choral groups, as well as outreach activities for the marginalised like the elderly, orphans, the sick, and the imprisoned.

Outside of liturgical use, Bukas Palad is also a highly acclaimed performing group, having staged concerts in churches, theatres, concert halls, convention centers, and shopping malls.

== Discography ==
=== Albums ===
- Bukas Palad (1986)
- Pasko Na! (1987)
- Tanging Yaman (1989)
- Balang Araw (1992)
- In Him Alone (1995)
- The Best of Bukas Palad, Volume 1 (1999)
- The Best of Bukas Palad, Volume 2 (1999)
- Pasko Na! (1999)
- All Shall Be Well (2002)
- Tinapay ng Buhay (2002)
- Let Your Praises Be Heard (2003)
- God of Silence (2005)
- Hindi Kita Malilimutan (2007)
- To Love & Serve (2009)
- Christify (2010)
- Pasko Na! Silver Anniversary Edition (2010)
- Sing Forever (2011)
- Light From Light (2012)
- Behold the Child (2013)
- Huwag Kang Mangamba (2014)
- Behold the Cross (2016)
- Behold the Risen Lord (2019)
- If I Could Touch You: Songs and Prayers for Healing and New Hope (2020)
- Poong Jesus Nazareno (2021)
- Bless Our Darkness (2025)

=== Collaborations ===
- Narito Ako (Praise Inc., 1985)
- Likhawit: Isang Handog (Praise Inc., 1993)
- Tell The World Of His Love (Praise Inc., 1994)
- Jubilaeum 2000: In The Fullness Of Time (Star Music, 2000)
- Far Greater Love (JesCom Music, 2000)
- Something More: Songs For Skeptics (JesCom Music, 2001)
- Luceat Lux (Xavier School Music Greenhills, 2002)
- Huwag Mangamba (JesCom Music, 2002)
- Noel (JesCom Music, 2003)
- Mga Mysterio Ng Liwanag (Universal Records, 2003)
- Kapayapaan (JesCom Music, 2004)
- Born Diva (Star Music, 2004)
- Red Cross: I Move, I Give, I Love (Star Music, 2009)
- Only In Love (JesCom Music, 2009)
- Mercy And Compassion: Songs for Pope Francis (JesCom Music, 2015)
- Mass of Mercy And Compassion: Songs from the Luneta Papal Mass (JesCom Music, 2015)

=== Bukas Palad Popular Singles ===
- "Tanging Yaman" (also covered by Carol Banawa, Basil Valdez and Agot Isidro)
- "Sa Yo Lamang" (also covered by Joey Albert and Juris)
- "Humayo't Ihayag' (also covered by Noel Cabangon)
- "Free" (a song finalist on Himig Handog PPop Loves Song)
- "Prayer of Rupert Mayer"

== Awards and citations ==
- 2019 Catholic Mass Media Awards
  - Best Religious Album, Behold The Risen Lord - nominee
- 27th Awit Awards (2014)
  - Best Christmas Song, Tahanan (by Gino Torres, from Behold The Child) - nominee
- 2013 Catholic Mass Media Awards
  - Best Religious Album, Light From Light - nominee
- 25th Awit Awards (2012)
  - Best Inspirational Religious Song, Sing Forever/Magsiawit Magpakailanman (by Norman Agatep and Roy Tolentino, from Sing Forever) - nominee
- 2010 Catholic Mass Media Awards
  - Best Religious Album, To Love & Serve - nominee
- 23rd Awit Awards (2010)
  - Best Inspirational Religious Song, Iukit Ang 'Yong Batas (from To Love & Serve album) - nominee
- 2008 Catholic Mass Media Awards
  - Best Religious Album, Hindi Kita Malilimutan - winner
- 2006 Catholic Mass Media Awards
  - Best Religious Album, God of Silence - nominee
- 19th Awit Awards (2006)
  - Best Performance by a Group, Servant Song (fr. God of Silence album) - nominee
  - Best Vocal Arrangement, Servant Song (fr. God of Silence album) - nominee (Palan Reyes, arranger)
- 17th Aliw Awards (2004)
  - Best Choral Group - nominee
- 2004 Catholic Mass Media Awards
  - Best Religious Album, Let Your Praises Be Heard - nominee
- 17th Awit Awards
  - Best Inspirational Religious Song, Awit sa Ina ng Santo Rosario (with Karylle) - winner
  - Best Inspirational Religious Song, We Are Yours (by Noel Miranda, from Let Your Praises Be Heard album) - nominee
