= Tiyanaks =

- Tiyanaks Movie Poster
- Directed by: Mark A. Reyes
- Screenplay by: Fairlane C. Raymundo; Venjie Pellena
- Story by: Mark A. Reyes; Fairlane C. Raymundo; Venjie Pellena; Roselle Monteverde-Teo
- Produced by: Roselle Monteverde-Teo
- Starring: Rica Peralejo; Jennylyn Mercado; Mark Herras; JC De Vera
- Cinematography: Tim Jimenez
- Edited by: Frank Aldana
- Music by: Arnold Buena; Allan Feliciano
- Production company: Regal Films
- Distributed by: Regal Films
- Release date: July 4, 2007
- Country: Philippines
- Languages: Filipino; English
- Box office: ₱19,700,000.00

Tiyanaks is a horror thriller film directed by Mark A. Reyes and starring Rica Peralejo, Jennylyn Mercado, Mark Herras, and JC De Vera. It is the second installment of the Tiyanak film series.

== Plot ==
A school organization heads off to a Holy Week retreat, led by their religion professor. Before long, they realize they have lost their way due to misdirection and have no choice but to stay the night in a desolate house, with only a mother Mildred and her son Biboy living in the house.

The boy has three playmates who become jealous when the boy declines to join them in play, which angers them, and they seek vengeance on the newcomers. Nights later, the kids transform themselves into their real form as tiyanaks with elemental powers of water, air, and land, who attack the group, killing and disabling them one by one, until only the professor, the mother and her son, and some students remain. The mother dies when a tiyanak bites her while defending her son. The students kill two of the tiyanaks with holy relics but fall short when dispatching the last of them. The professor has the idea of baptizing the tiyanaks by submersing them on the pool, killing the last one with this method.

Days later, the survivors have a party when Sheila checks on Biboy who contracted a fever. When they try to find out what happened, the boy's eyes become fiery and enraged, and his head becomes engulfed in flames, revealing himself as a tiyanak.

== Cast ==
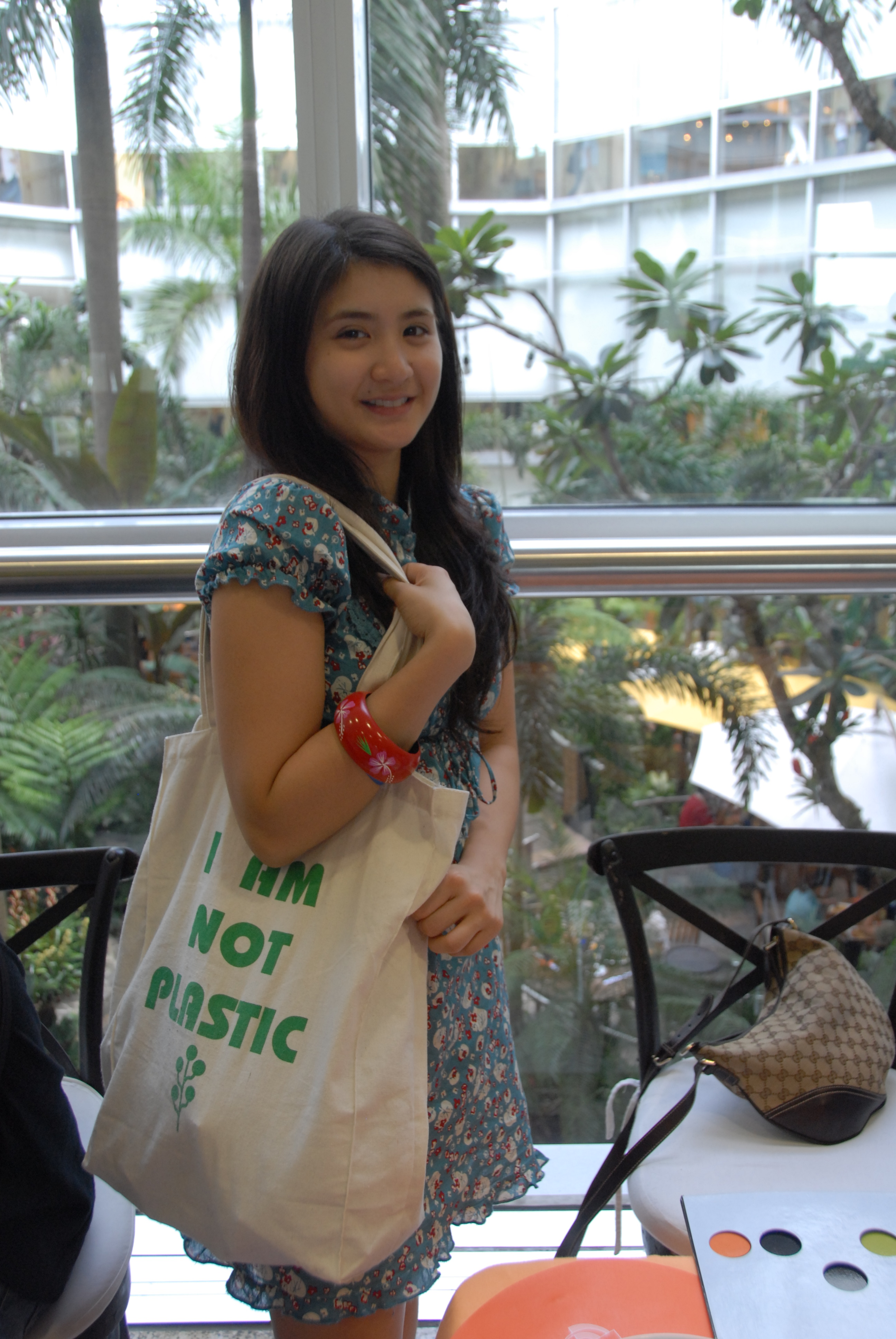
Rica Peralejo portrays Sheila

- Rica Peralejo as Sheila
- Jennylyn Mercado as Rina
- Mark Herras as Christian
- JC De Vera as Kerwin
- Lotlot De Leon as Mildred
- TJ Trinidad as Professor Earl
- Nash Aguas as Biboy
- Karel Marquez as Cindy
- Ryan Yllana as PJ
- Jill Yulo as Hanz
- Alwyn Uytingco as Bryan
- Andrei Felix as Rex
- Tom Olivar as Mang Gaston
- Alcris Galura as Gasoline Boy
- Mika Dela Cruz as Water Tiyanak
- Rian Josh Conde as Land Tiyanak
- Moki Torralba as Air Tiyanak
- Ana Roces as Mother of Land Tiyanak

== See also ==
- List of ghost films
