= P.I. (TV series) =

- Genre: Drama, Crime/Thriller
- Written by: Sam Lee; Timothy Teoh; Lawrence Gray
- Directed by: Ian Seymour; S Deakarajen; Manoj Prabhoda Chandran
- Starring: Carl Ng; Vanessa Vanderstraaten; Karylle; Kathiravan Kandavelu; Joyce Ng; Najib Soiman; Shane Mardjuki
- Country of origin: Singapore
- Original language: English
- No. of episodes: 13

Production
- Production company: Mediacorp Studios

Original release
- Network: MediaCorp TV Channel 5
- Release: January 9 – January 31, 2017

P.I. sometimes referred to as Private Investigator is a Singaporean crime/thriller drama produced by Mediacorp Studios, starring Carl Ng, Vanessa Vanderstraaten, Karylle, Kathiravan Kandavelu, Joyce Ng, Najib Soiman and Shane Mardjuki.

The series premiered on MediaCorp TV Channel 5 on January 9, 2017.

== Cast ==
=== Main cast ===
- Carl Ng as Donny Lai
- Vanessa Vanderstraaten as Christine Yeoh-Ong
- Karylle as Maia Yap
- Kathiravan as Mozzie
- Najib Soiman as Bruno
- Joyce Ng as Rabbit Warrior

=== Supporting cast ===
- Shane Mardjuki as Sam Ong
- Kaidon Lee Jinyan as Josh
- Silvarajoo as Captain Aru
- Atyy Malek as Hannah
- Taufio Saleh as Insp. Amin
- Audrey Lim as Cpl. Sharon
- Doreen Choo as Lizzy
- Soraya Buchanan as Mrs Olivero
- Jed Senthul as Mr. Raja

=== Special guest ===
- Terence Tay as Wilson
- Robin Leong as Pedro
- Isaac Chua as Michael
- Adele Wong as Cheryl C
- Derrick Ee as Ah Seng

== Episodes ==
No.	Title	Original release date
1	"Honesty’s The Best Agency"	January 9, 2017
2	"Honey Trap"	January 10, 2017
3	"Hard Drive"	January 11, 2017
4	"Sex, Lies, and a Gun to the Head"	January 12, 2017
5	"V"	January 16, 2017
6	"Runaround"	January 17, 2017
7	"In Friends We Trust"	January 18, 2017
8	"Wolf in Sheep's Clothing"	January 19, 2017
9	"Shallow Grave"	January 23, 2017
10	"Liar Liar"	January 24, 2017
11	"Trust No One"	January 25, 2017
12	"Things Fall Apart"	January 26, 2017
13	"Full Circle"	January 31, 2017
