= Karylle =

Filipina entertainer (born 1981)

- Karylle in 2026
- Born: Ana Karylle Padilla Tatlonghari; March 22, 1981 (age 45); Manila, Philippines
- Education: Ateneo de Manila University (BS)
- Occupations: Singer; actress; television host; record producer; film producer; podcaster; entrepreneur; philanthropist
- Years active: 2000–present
- Works: Discography
- Spouse: Yael Yuzon (m. 2014)
- Mother: Zsa Zsa Padilla
- Family: Padilla family
- Musical career
- Genre: Pop
- Instrument: Vocals
- Labels: Universal Records (2001–2008); EMI Philippines (2009–present)

Ana Karylle Padilla Tatlonghari-Yuzon (born March 22, 1981), known mononymously as Karylle, is a Filipino actress, television host, singer, and businesswoman. Having achieved mainstream success across stage, screen, and music, her accolades include three Aliw Awards, an Asian Television Award, four Awit Awards, a FAMAS Award, a Metro Manila Film Festival Award, a New York Festivals International TV and Film Award, and a Star Award for Television, including nominations from Gawad Buhay Awards, Golden Screen Awards, and Monte Carlo Festival.

Born and raised in Manila, Philippines, Karylle first ventured into theater musical in 2000 and played several supporting roles in film and television. She rose to stardom after playing Sanggre Alena in the drama fantasy series Encantadia (2005). She reprised her role in the succeeding sequels and crossover such as Etheria (2005), Mulawin: The Movie (2005) and Encantadia: Pag-ibig Hanggang Wakas (2006). It was followed by the theatrical release of the blockbuster film Moments of Love (2006), which she starred with Iza Calzado and Dingdong Dantes. She returned to stage and appeared in two major productions: Cat in the Hat (2007) and West Side Story (2008), garnering praises from the critics. Following her transfer to ABS-CBN, she made several appearances in television shows such as Nasaan Ka Maruja? (2009) and Dahil May Isang Ikaw (2009), which earned a nomination at the International Emmy Awards.

In 2010, she played a supporting role in the horror film Dalaw and became one of the mainstay host of the long-running noontime show It's Showtime the following year. She was cast as one of the lead in the Singaporean TV series The Kitchen Musical, earning her a bronze medal for "Best Performance" at the New York Festivals and a "Best Actress" nomination at the Monte Carlo Festival. On screen, she appeared in several international productions such as Point of Entry (2012) and P.I. (2017), as well as in the fantasy film Mystified (2019), which earned a nomination at the Asian Academy Creative Awards. On theaters, she appeared in more stage productions in the following years including Rodgers and Rama Hari (2012), Rodgers and Hammerstein's Cinderella (2013), Carousel (2022) and The Sound of Music (2023) among others.

As a recording artist, Karylle has released six studio albums since 2001. According to PARI, her most successful releases include the platinum-sellers Time for Letting Go (2009), Roadtrip (2011), and the gold-certified albums Time to Shine (2001) and K (2013). The song she co-wrote with Jerome Hughes, Pabigyan Ng Puso, won "Best Original Song" at the 30th Metro Manila Film Festival for the movie Mano Po III: My Love. Her musical work have earned her nominations from Asian Television Awards, Awit Awards and Star Awards for Music. Philanthropically, she has been active in supporting the Philippine Animal Welfare Society (PAWS) and charity organizations like White Cross Orphanage and ChildHaus.

== Early life and education ==
Ana Karylle Padilla Tatlonghari was born on March 22, 1981, in Manila to Zsa Zsa Padilla, a singer-actress and Dr. Modesto Tatlonghari. She is the granddaughter of boxing referee Carlos Padilla Jr. Her parents separated when she was six years old. Karylle has two half-sisters, Nicole and Zia Quizon, from her mother's relationship to actor and comedian Dolphy.

Karylle completed her grade school at O.B. Montessori Center in Greenhills, San Juan where she was class valedictorian. She then went to Saint Pedro Poveda College for her secondary education, where she finished with a service medal for extra-curricular and volunteer works. She began taking formal ballet lessons at the age of three and continued until she was fifteen. In college, Karylle took up a Bachelor of Science degree in management, majoring in communications technology management, at the Ateneo de Manila University, where she made the Dean's list numerous times. She graduated in 2002.

== Acting career ==
=== 2000–2004: Early works ===
In 2000, Karylle made her acting debut in the stage musical Little Mermaid, in which she played Princess Sapphire. Her performance in the Trumpets production is known to have been her breakthrough in show business.

In 2001, Karylle began appearing on television. She became a co-host and performer in GMA Network's variety show SOP.

From 2002 to 2004, Karylle took on a series of supporting roles in both films and television series. Her film debut was in Ang Agimat: Anting-anting ni Lolo, an official entry for the 28th Metro Manila Film Festival. In television, she made her first appearance in the drama series Twin Hearts, portraying the character Iris. Initially scheduled for only a week, the show's producers were impressed with the chemistry between Karylle and actor Dingdong Dantes, leading them to ask her to take on another character, Jade. The success of Twin Hearts paved the way for further on-screen collaborations between Karylle and Dantes in the subsequent years, starting with the fourth season of the romantic anthology series Love to Love. In this series, she portrayed Cathy Ruiz, an Ilonggo from Guimaras, earning her a nomination for Outstanding Lead Actress at the 2nd Golden Screen TV Awards. Karylle also had roles in two Mano Po films: Mano Po 2: My Home in 2003 and Mano Po III: My Love in 2004.

=== 2005–2009: Encantandia and move to ABS-CBN ===
In 2005, she appeared in the horror film Bahay ni Lola 2; her first leading role in a film. She then starred in the fantasy drama series Enacantadia as Sang'gre Alena, alongside Iza Calzado, Dingdong Dantes, Sunshine Dizon, Jennylyn Mercado, and Diana Zubiri. Encantandia was a groundbreaking success, spawning a multimedia franchise. Karylle reprised her role in the sequel series Etheria and the crossover film Mulawin: The Movie, both released later in the year.

In 2006, Karylle had two major projects: Encantadia: Pag-ibig Hanggang Wakas, which was the third installment to the Encantadia franchise; and the romance film Moments of Love, which became a box office hit.

In 2007, Karylle starred in two independent films: Ligaw Liham and Pi7ong Tagpo. She also served as producer for the former, which was an official entry for the 3rd Cinemalaya Independent Film Festival. During the year, Karylle also returned to the stage and starred as Cat in the Hat in the Atlantis Production of Seussical.

In 2008, Karylle appeared as host in the reality show Pinoy Idol Extra, alongside Rhian Ramos. She then played the female lead role of Maria on the Stages production of the popular musical West Side Story, alternating with Joanna Ampil. This also marked her first of many on-stage and on-screen collaborations with Christian Bautista, who stars as Tony. Her performance on West Side Story was acclaimed by critics, garnering her a nomination for Best Stage Actress at the 22nd Aliw Awards. During the last quarter of the year, Karylle made big career changes. She changed her management from Genesis to Stages, her recording company from Universal Records to PolyEast Records, and transferred from GMA to its rival station ABS-CBN. She signed her ABS-CBN contract shortly after an appearance in the Oscar De La Hoya vs. Manny Pacquiao boxing match in Las Vegas, Nevada, where she sang the Philippine national anthem. Her first appearance as a Kapamilya was in the variety show ASAP.

In 2009, after guest appearances in the musical drama anthology Your Song, and the comedy drama I Love Betty La Fea, Karylle starred in Mars Ravelo's Nasaan Ka Maruja? alongside Kristine Hermosa and Derek Ramsay. She would then be a part of the main cast of the International Emmy-nominated drama series, Dahil May Isang Ikaw. Karylle also played the lead role in the independent drama film Litsonero, opposite Paolo Contis.

=== 2010–2019: International ventures & It's Showtime ===
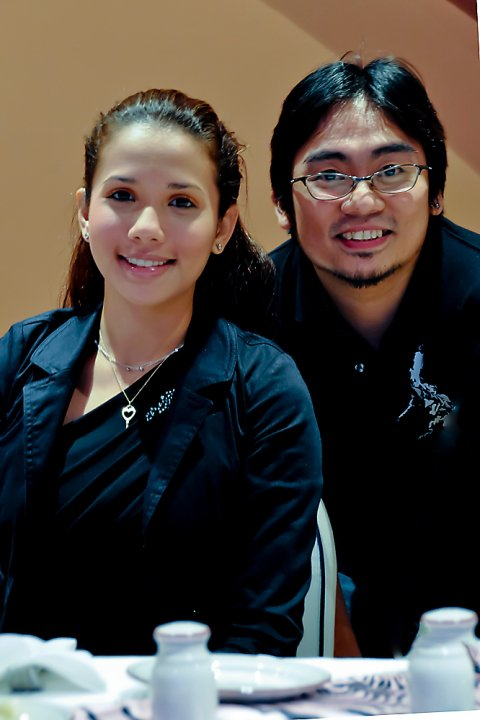
Karylle in 2010

In 2010, Karylle joined Bangs Garcia, Rayver Cruz, and Sid Lucero in Gilda Olvidado's Magkano ang Iyong Dangal?. Later that year, she started appearing as a judge on the noontime variety show Showtime. In December, Karylle had a supporting role in the horror film Dalaw, starring Kris Aquino. The film was a box office success and became one of the highest-grossing entries at the 36th Metro Manila Film Festival.

In 2011, Karylle officially became a regular host for Showtime, joining Kim Atienza, Teddy Corpuz, Anne Curtis, Vice Ganda, Jugs Jugueta, Vhong Navarro, and fellow newcomer Billy Crawford. The group of hosts was nominated for Best Talent Search Program Host at the 25th PMPC Star Awards for Television. During the year, Karylle also achieved international recognition for her starring role in the acclaimed Singaporean musical drama The Kitchen Musical, which aired across twelve countries via AXN. The series was highly successful, with the cast winning the bronze medal for Best Performance at the New York Festivals TV & Film Awards. Karylle's role as Maddie Avilon earned her a nomination for Outstanding Actress in a Drama Series at the Monte-Carlo Television Festival's Golden Nymph Awards held in Monaco. Furthermore, she and co-star Christian Bautista received an International Achievement Award at the 24th Awit Awards for their work in the series.

In 2012, Karylle was featured as a guest star in the third season of the Singaporean action drama Point of Entry, her second international project. Later that year, Karylle also starred with her frequent collaborator Christian Bautista in a critically acclaimed staging of Rama, Hari at the Cultural Center of the Philippines. At the 26th PMPC Star Awards for Television, Karylle and her It's Showtime co-hosts won the award for Best Reality and Game Show Host.

In 2013, Karylle top billed a new version of Rodgers & Hammerstein's Cinderella at the Newport Performing Arts Theater in Resorts World Manila. At the end of the year, Karylle received nominations for her hosting on It's Showtime: Outstanding Female Host in a Musical or Variety Program at the 4th Golden Screen TV Awards, and Best Female TV Host at the 27th PMPC Star Awards for Television.

From 2014 to 2016, Karylle's continued work as host on It's Showtime earned her a second and third nomination for Outstanding Female Host in a Musical or Variety Program at the 5th and 6th Golden Screen TV Awards, respectively. She also received her second nomination for Best Female TV Host at the 30th PMPC Star Awards for Television.

In 2017, Karylle starred in the Singaporean crime thriller P.I..

In 2018, Karylle made a surprise cameo appearance in the finale of the highly rated and acclaimed drama Wildflower. The episode trended on social media, with many viewers finding Karylle's casting inspired. Karylle also appeared as guest presenter on the television news broadcasting show TV Patrol.

In 2019, Karylle produced and starred in the fantasy film Mystified, distributed by Iflix. It was the first project released under Sanggre Productions, Inc., a production company founded by Karylle and her former Encantandia co-stars and off-screen friends Iza Calzado, Sunshine Dizon, Diana Zubiri, along with director Mark A. Reyes. The film was a success, earning four nominations at the 24th Asian Television Awards, winning one for Best Single Drama or Telemovie. The film was also nominated for Best Visual or Special FX in TV Series or Feature Film at the 2nd Asian Academy Creative Awards, after being announced as the national winner.

=== 2021–present: Continued success ===
In 2021, Karylle appeared in the romantic comedy television miniseries B&B: The Story of the Battle of Brody & Brandy, starring Iza Calzado and Ian Veneracion. She also served as producer for the show.

In 2022, Karylle top billed the Repertory Philippines production of Rodgers and Hammerstein's musical Carousel, opposite Gian Magdangal. For her performance as Julie Jordan, Karylle received several acting nominations: Female Lead Performance in a Musical at the 13th Gawad Buhay Awards, Best Lead Actress in a Musical at the 36th Aliw Awards, and Best Performer in a Musical at the 2023 BroadwayWorld Philippines Awards.

In 2023, Karylle primarily focused on theater and appeared in four stage productions. She played the role of Baroness Elsa von Schraeder in the Manila run of the international tour of the Broadway International Group and Broadway Asia co-production of The Sound of Music. She then participated in the musical concert Contra Mundum: Ang All-star Concert ng Ang Larawan held at the Manila Metropolitan Theater; starred in the musical play Isang Gabi ng Sarsuwela; and reprised her role as Sita in a restaging of the rock opera ballet Rama, Hari. At the end of the year, Karylle also appeared in two comedy films: Ma'am Chief: Shakedown in Seoul and Becky & Badette.

In 2024, Karylle headlined the Manila staging of the Broadway musical Little Shop of Horrors, opposite Nyoy Volante and alternating with Sue Ramirez. For her performance as Audrey, she won Best Lead Actress in a Musical at the 37th Aliw Awards.

In 2025, Karylle appeared as former First Lady of the Philippines, Aurora Quezon in the biopic Quezon, starring Jericho Rosales. Her portrayal received critical acclaim and garnered her the FAMAS Award for Best Supporting Actress. The film grossed over Php 100 million, making it Karylle's highest-grossing film since 2010.

In 2026, Karylle joins the cast of the Manila run of the musical Charlie and the Chocolate Factory.

Karylle will next star in an eight-part unscripted reality series Manila Matriarchs and is set for a return to television acting in the teleserye Someone, Someday.

== Music career ==
In 2001, Karylle entered the music scene with her first studio album, Time to Shine, released under Universal Records. It spawned the single "Can't Live Without You" which won the Awit Award for Best Performance by a New Female Recording Artist and two MTV Pilipinas Music Awards for Favorite Female Video and Favorite New Artist in a Video. The album also includes two collaborations: "Calling" with German singer Gil Ofarim, and "Kung Mawawala Ka" with Ogie Alcasid. The latter won the award for Best Performance by a Duet at the 16th Awit Awards.

In 2003, Karylle collaborated with the contemporary worship musical group Bukas Palad Music Ministry and released the religious song "Awit sa Ina ng Santo Rosario". It won them the award for Best Inspirational/Religious Recording at the 17th Awit Awards.

In 2004, Karylle released "Pagbigyan ang Puso", a duet with Jerome John Hughes. It was the theme song for her film Mano Po III: My Love, which was an official entry at the 30th Metro Manila Film Festival. At the festival's awards night, it won Best Original Theme Song.

In 2005, Karylle released her sophomore studio album,You Make Me Sing. The album includes the self-written songs "Coz, I Love You" and "Hiling"; as well as "Mahiwagang Puso", the official theme song for her hit fantasy series Encantadia. The album was well-received, with the title track being nominated for Best R&B Song at the 19th Awit Awards, and Favorite Female Video at the 8th MTV Pilipinas Music Award.

In 2009, Karylle released her third studio album, Time for Letting Go, under a new recording company Polyeast Records. It is described as a collection of songs about moving on, exploring the five stages of grief. It was supported by the singles "I'll Never Get Over You (Getting Over Me)", and "Almost Over You". The album also features "Live for Your Love", a duet with her mom, Zsa Zsa Padilla; and three of Karylle's original compositions: "Minamahal Kita", "Hulog ng Langit" and "Wala Na Bang Lahat". The album garnered her a nomination for Favorite Female Artist at the 5th Myx Music Awards and was certified Platinum by the Philippine Association of the Record Industry.

In 2011, Karylle released her fourth studio album, Roadtrip. She described it as "her most personal and perhaps even most ambitious musical outing" up to that point, representing who she is, as an artist, singer, and songwriter. All the songs were independently produced and written by Karylle. Its lead single, "OMG", was featured in the American reality television series, Floribama Shore; and was nominated for Best Dance Recording at the 25th Awit Awards.

In 2013, Karylle released "Sa’yo Na Lang Ako", an official entry for the year's Philippine Popular Music Festival. It was included in her fifth studio album, K, which was released later that year and spawned the singles "Kiss You" and Kapiling Kita". The album was eventually certified gold by PARI. At the 27th Awit Awards, she received three nominations: Best Performance by a Female Recording Artist & Best Ballad Recording for "Sa 'Yo na Lang Ako"; and Best Dance Recording for "Kiss You".

In 2015, Karylle was on the panel of judges for the 4th Philippine Popular Music Festival. In November, Karylle released her sixth studio album, A Different Playground. She described it as a reflection on her married life. It earned her a nomination for Female Pop Artist of the Year at the 8th PMPC Star Awards for Music. Additionally, the album includes the song "Paano ko Tuturuan ang Puso", which was nominated for Best Performance by a Female Recording Artist at the 29th Awit Awards.

In 2019, Karylle released "Simula", the official theme song for her fantasy film, Mystified. It was nominated for Best Theme Song at the 24th Asian Television Awards.

In 2020, Karylle released The Holy Rosary: Roses for Mary, a spoken word recording of rosary-based prayers, which also included two religious songs.

== Other ventures ==
=== Writing ===
Karylle is a prolific writer and blogger. She has written blogs for Yahoo!, and was a contributing writer for The Philippine Star and S Magazine. Karylle launched her own blog site in 2016.

List of articles with dates published
Title	Date published	Ref.
No, nobody can hold us down	July 19, 2007	
From ‘business-business’ to real business	December 16, 2007	
My other promdi province	March 31, 2008	
Come out & play	May 18, 2008	
From Manila to Mt. Everest and back… and back again	August 3, 2008	
Taking you where it happens, as it happens	August 10, 2008	
Things about West Side you don't know	October 12, 2008	
My 'fan' London diaries	August 9, 2009	
ART-icle	October 30, 2009	
Little Heroes, Big Hearts	February 1, 2010	
Suma-sideline	August 2, 2010	

=== Production ===
In 2007, Karylle served as producer on the independent drama film Ligaw Liham, in which she also starred in.

In 2018, Karylle, along with Iza Calzado, Sunshine Dizon, Diana Zubiri, and Mark A. Reyes started the production company Sanggre Productions, Inc. Through the company, she served as producer for the film Mystified, and the miniseries B&B: The Story of the Battle of Brody & Brandy.

=== Endorsements ===
Karylle has appeared in various endorsements for brands such as Ever Bilena, Bench Body, Santé Barley, Fruitas, Adidas, Belo Medical Group, UniSilver, Status Hair Salon, and OraCare.

According to the Ever Bilena executives, they picked the singer-actress as brand ambassador because she is "a true reflection of a woman of her generation — someone who is passionate, sincere and confident; and epitomizes the spirit of a strong modern woman".

After her move to ABS-CBN, it came as a surprise to everyone when Karylle became an endorser for the clothing brand Bench, with her billboards seen all over the Metro Manila for the ad "Single is Sexy!" indicating that she was changing her image.

=== Business ===
Karylle is an entrepreneur. She is the owner of the family KTV and resto-bar CenterStage at Tomas Morato Avenue in Quezon City, Jupiter in Makati and SM Mall of Asia (MOA) in Pasay and part-owner of Mey Lin Restaurant and a The Mango Farm dessert kiosk in Greenhills, San Juan.

=== Podcast ===
In January 2024, Karylle launched her own podcast, K's Drama, on various streaming platforms.

=== Radio ===
In March 2024, Karylle was announced as a co-host for the morning radio show, Good Times with Mo, joining Mo Twister and Sam Oh.

== Personal life ==
On March 21, 2014, Karylle married Sponge Cola vocalist Yael Yuzon at San Antonio de Padua Church in Pooc, Silang, Cavite, after dating for over three years. Their 10th wedding anniversary was celebrated on March 9, 2024, in a wedding vow renewal ceremony attended by Yael's older brother Yani and sister Ysabel alongside the Bukas Palad Music Ministry at the Church of the Gesù, Quezon City.

== Filmography ==
=== Film ===
Year	Title	Role	Notes
2002	Ang Agimat: Anting-anting ni Lolo	Maria Makiling	
2003	Mano Po 2: My Home	Rose Chan	
2004	Masikip sa Dibdib: The Boobita Rose Story	Herself	Cameo
2004	Mano Po III: My Love	Judith Yang	
2005	Bahay ni Lola 2	Nina	
2005	Mulawin: The Movie	Sang'gre Alena	
2006	Moments of Love	Lianne Santos	
2007	Ligaw Liham	Karen	Also producer
2007	Pi7ong Tagpo	Angela Rodriguez	Segment: "Toga"
2009	Litsonero	Carmel	
2010	Dalaw	Lorna	
2012	My Cactus Heart	Videoke Artist	Cameo
2013	Girl, Boy, Bakla, Tomboy	Peter's Crush	Cameo
2017	My Ex and Whys	Herself	Uncredited cameo
2019	Mystified	Helena	Also producer
2023	Ma'am Chief: Shakedown in Seoul	Police Exec. Msgt. Olga Tentativa	
2023	Becky & Badette	Working girl 2	
2025	Quezon	Aurora Quezon	

=== Television ===
Year	Title	Role
2001–2008	SOP	Herself / co-host / performer
2003–2004	Twin Hearts	Iris Medira / Jade Villanueva
2004	Love To Love: Sweet Exchange	Cathy Ruiz
2005	1st Philippine Hip-Hop Music Awards	Herself / host
2005	Encantadia	Sang'gre Alena
2005	Bubble Gang	Herself / guest
2005	Wag Kukurap	Faustina
2005	7th MTV Pilipinas Music Awards	Herself / host
2005–2006	Etheria: Ang Ikalimang Kaharian ng Encantadia	Reyna Alena
2006	Encantadia: Pag-ibig Hanggang Wakas	Reyna Alena
2006	Lagot Ka, Isusumbong Kita	Lianne
2006	My Music Station	Herself / host
2006–2007	GMA New Year Countdown	Herself / host
2007	Magic Kamison	Rianne
2007	Kamandag	Spectra
2008	Pinoy Idol Extra	Herself / host
2008	Oscar De La Hoya vs. Manny Pacquiao	Philippine National Anthem singer
2008–2015; 2026–present	ASAP	Herself / co-host / performer
2009	I Love Betty La Fea	Olivia
2009	Your Song Presents: Feb-ibig	Rose
2009	Komiks Presents: Mars Ravelo's: Nasaan Ka Maruja?	Helen Rivera
2009	Dahil May Isang Ikaw	Denise Mae Alferos
2009	Maalaala Mo Kaya: Gitara	Tara Santelices
2010	Magkano ang Iyong Dangal?	Tanya
2010	Kabuhayang Swak na Swak	Herself / guest co-host
2010	Panahon Ko 'to!: Ang Game Show ng Buhay Ko	Herself / contestant
2010–present	It's Showtime	Herself / host / judge
2011	The Biggest Loser Asia	Herself / host
2011	The Kitchen Musical	Maddie Avilon
2012	Point of Entry	Tala Sison
2013	Showtime Holy Week Special	Lotlot Sacdalan
2014	Showtime Holy Week Special	Haydee Mañosca
2014	Himig Handog Pinoy Pop Love Songs Finale	Herself
2014	The Best Thing I Ever Ate Philippines	Herself
2015	Showtime Holy Week Special	Bev of Minstrels of Hope
2015	Ten-4 Para sa Pilipino	Herself / guest co-host
2015	I-Shine Talent Camp	Herself / mentor
2016	Showtime Holy Week Special	Santa
2016	Born for You	Herself
2016	Minute to Win It	Herself / contestant
2017	P.I.	Maia
2017	Minute to Win It: Last Duo Standing	Herself / contestant
2018	Wildflower	Venus
2018	TV Patrol	Herself / guest presenter
2018	I Can See Your Voice	Herself / contestant
2021	B&B: The Story of the Battle of Brody & Brandy	Ena
2023	Ur Da Boss	Herself / guest
2023	Magandang Buhay	Herself / guest
2024–2025	Unang Hirit	Herself / guest co-host
2026	Someone, Someday	Abigail Dominguez
2026	Manila Matriarchs	Herself

== Theatre ==
Year	Title	Role
2000	Little Mermaid	Princess Sapphire
2007	Seussical	Cat in the Hat
2008	West Side Story	Maria
2012	Rama, Hari	Sita
2013	Cinderella	Cinderella
2016	Awitin Mo at Isasayaw Ko	Ester
2022	Carousel	Julie Jordan
2023	The Sound of Music	Baroness Elsa von Schraeder
2023	Contra Mundum: Ang All-star Concert ng Ang Larawan	Paula Marasigan
2023	Isang Gabi ng Sarsuwela	Hulya
2023–2024	Rama, Hari	Sita
2024	Little Shop of Horrors	Audrey
2026	Charlie and the Chocolate Factory	Mrs. Bucket

== Discography ==
- Time to Shine (2001)
- You Make Me Sing (2005)
- Time for Letting Go (2009)
- Roadtrip (2011)
- K (2013)
- A Different Playground (2015)

== Concerts ==
=== Headlining and co-headlining concerts ===
List of concerts, with co-headliners, dates, and venues
Year	Title	Venue	Ref.
2008	Souls in Love	Teatrino, Promenade Greenhills, San Juan City	
2009	The Magic of Love	Shangri-La Plaza, Mandaluyong City	
2011	May Minamahal	Bangko Sentral Convention Center, Davao City	
2012	Love and Laughter	Resorts World Manila, Pasay City	
2013	Mother's Day: Back to Back Concert	The Evan Theatre, Sydney; Dallas Brooks Center, Melbourne	
2013	It's Showtime Live! in Honolulu	Neal S. Blaisdell Center Arena, Honolulu	
2014	Love in the City	Pulsar Hotel, Tuguegarao City	
2014	Making Beautiful Music with Karylle	Shangri-La Plaza, Mandaluyong City	
2014	It's Showtime Canada	Ricoh Coliseum, Toronto, Ontario; Shaw Conference Centre, Edmonton, Alberta	
2014	Rock that Love	Du Arena, Yas Island, Abu Dhabi	
2015	Boracay Blast Summer Beach Party	Sealine Beach Resort, Mesaieed	
2015	Next Attraction (The Repeat)	Music Museum, San Juan City	
2015	It's Showtime Kapamilya Day: The ANIMversary Kick-off	Smart Araneta Coliseum, Quezon City	
2016	A Different Playground	Teatrino, Promenade Greenhills, San Juan City	
2017	Karylle Live!	U.P.–Ayala Land TechnoHub, Quezon City	
2018	Date Night	Manila House, Bonifacio Global City, Taguig City	
2018	It's Showtime U.S.A.	Pechanga Resort & Casino, Temecula, California; Thunder Valley Casino Resort, Lincoln, California	
2018	Karylle with The Passport Holders	Shangri-La Plaza, Mandaluyong City	

== Awards and nominations ==
Award-giving body	Year (Note: Indicates the year of ceremony. Each year is linked to the article about the awards held that year, wherever possible.)	Nominee / Work	Category	Result	Ref.
Aliw Awards	2001	Karylle	Best New Artist	Won	
Aliw Awards	2002	"Can't Live Without You"	Most Promising Female Artist	Won	
Aliw Awards	2009	West Side Story	Best Stage Actress (Musical)	Nominated	
Aliw Awards	2023	Carousel	Best Lead Actress in a Musical	Nominated	
Aliw Awards	2024	Little Shop of Horrors	Best Lead Actress in a Musical	Won	
Anak TV Seal Awards	2023	Karylle	Net Makabata Star	Won	
Anak TV Seal Awards	2024	Karylle	Makabata Star	Won	
ASAP Pop Viewers' Choice Awards	2011	"OMG"	Pop Music Video	Nominated	
Asian Academy Creative Awards	2019	Mystified	Best Visual or Special FX in TV Series or Feature Film (Note: Nominated as Producer.)	Nominated	
Asian Television Awards	2020	Mystified	Best Single Drama or Telemovie	Won	
Asian Television Awards	2020	Mystified	Best Original Digital Drama Series	Nominated	
Asian Television Awards	2020	"Simula"	Best Theme Song	Nominated	
Awit Awards	2002	"Can't Live Without You"	Best Performance by a New Female Recording Artist	Won	
Awit Awards	2003	"Kung Mawawala Ka" (with Ogie Alcasid)	Best Performance by a Duet	Won	
Awit Awards	2004	"Awit sa Ina ng Santo Rosario" (with Bukas Palad Music Ministry)	Best Inspirational/Religious Recording	Won	
Awit Awards	2006	"You Make Me Sing"	Best R&B Song	Nominated	
Awit Awards	2011	The Kitchen Musical	International Achievement Award	Won	
Awit Awards	2012	"OMG"	Best Dance Recording	Nominated	
Awit Awards	2014	"Sa 'Yo na Lang Ako"	Best Performance by a Female Recording Artist	Nominated	
Awit Awards	2014	"Sa 'Yo na Lang Ako"	Best Ballad Recording	Nominated	
Awit Awards	2014	"Kiss You"	Best Dance Recording	Nominated	
Awit Awards	2016	"Paano Ko Tuturuan ang Puso"	Best Performance by a Female Recording Artist	Nominated	
BroadwayWorld Philippines Awards	2023	Carousel	Best Performer in a Musical	Nominated	
BroadwayWorld Philippines Awards	2023	Rama, Hari	Best Performer in a Musical	Nominated	
FAMAS Awards	2026	Quezon	Best Supporting Actress	Won	
Gawad Buhay Awards	2023	Carousel	Female Lead Performance in a Musical	Nominated	
Gawad PASADO Awards	2010	Karylle	PinakaPASADOng Dangal ng Kabataan	Won	
Golden Laurel Lyceans' Choice Media Awards	2022	It's Showtime	Best Variety Show Host/s (Shared with It's Showtime hosts.)	Won	
Golden Nymph Awards	2012	The Kitchen Musical	Outstanding Actress in a Drama Series	Nominated	
Golden Screen TV Awards	2005	Love To Love: Sweet Exchange	Outstanding Lead Actress	Nominated	
Golden Screen TV Awards	2013	It's Showtime	Outstanding Female Host in a Musical or Variety Program	Nominated	
Golden Screen TV Awards	2014	It's Showtime	Outstanding Female Host in a Musical or Variety Program	Nominated	
Golden Screen TV Awards	2015	It's Showtime	Outstanding Female Host in a Musical or Variety Program	Nominated	
Jeepney TV Fan Favorite Awards	2022	It's Showtime	Favorite Musical/Variety Show Host	Nominated	
Metro Manila Film Festival	2004	"Pagbigyan ang Puso" (with Jerome John Hughes)	Best Original Theme Song	Won	
MTV Pilipinas Music Awards	2002	"Can't Live Without You"	Favorite Female Video	Won	
MTV Pilipinas Music Awards	2002	"Can't Live Without You"	Favorite New Artist in a Video	Won	
MTV Pilipinas Music Awards	2006	"You Make Me Sing"	Favorite Female Video	Nominated	
Myx Music Awards	2009	"Only Hope" by Gary Valenciano	Favorite Guest Appearance in a Music Video	Won	
Myx Music Awards	2010	Time for Letting Go	Favorite Female Artist	Nominated	
Myx Music Awards	2012	Roadtrip	Favorite Female Artist	Nominated	
Myx Music Awards	2020	Karylle	Myx Celebrity VJ of the Year (Shared with Diana Zubiri, Iza Calzado, and Sunshine Dizon.)	Nominated	
New York Festivals TV & Film Awards	2012	The Kitchen Musical	Bronze Medal for Best Performance (Shared with the cast of The Kitchen Musical.)	Won	
Philippine Empowered Men and Women of the Year	2017	Karylle	Outstanding Women of the Year	Won	
PMPC Star Awards for Music	2016	A Different Playground	Female Pop Artist of the Year	Nominated	
PMPC Star Awards for Music	2018	Karylle	Frontrow Female Star of the Night	Won	
PMPC Star Awards for Television	2011	Showtime	Best Talent Search Program Hosts (Shared with Showtime hosts.)	Nominated	
PMPC Star Awards for Television	2012	It's Showtime	Best Reality/Game Show Host (Shared with It's Showtime hosts.)	Won	
PMPC Star Awards for Television	2013	It's Showtime	Best Female TV Host	Nominated	
PMPC Star Awards for Television	2016	It's Showtime	Best Female TV Host	Nominated	
PMPC Star Awards for Television	2021	It's Showtime	Best Female TV Host	Nominated	
PMPC Star Awards for Television	2023	It's Showtime	Best Female TV Host	Nominated	
PMPC Star Awards for Television	2025	It's Showtime	Best Female TV Host	Nominated	
PMPC Star Awards for Television	2025	It's Showtime	Best Female TV Host	Nominated	
Rawr Awards	2015	It's Showtime	Trending Love Team of the Year (Shared with Vice Ganda.)	Nominated	
Rawr Awards	2016	Karylle	Fan Club of the Year (Shared with Vice Ganda.)	Nominated	
Star Cinema Online Awards	2015	It's Showtime	Favorite TV Love Team (Shared with Vice Ganda.)	Nominated	
Star Cinema Online Awards	2015	Wrecking Bowl with Karylle	Favorite Wrecking Bowl	Won	
Star Cinema Online Awards	2015	Karylle	Favorite Fandom (Shared with Vice Ganda.)	Won	
Star Cinema Online Awards	2016	A Different Playground	Favorite Recording Artist	Nominated	
Star Cinema Online Awards	2016	It's Showtime	Favorite Love Team (Shared with Vice Ganda.)	Nominated	
Star Cinema Online Awards	2016	Karylle	Favorite Fitspiration	Nominated	
Star Cinema Online Awards	2016	Karylle	Favorite Fandom (Shared with Vice Ganda.)	Nominated	
Star Cinema Online Awards	2017	It's Showtime	Ultimate TV Host	Nominated	
Wish Music Awards	2019	"Iloveya"	Wishclusive Pop Performance of the Year	Nominated	
Wish Music Awards	2023	"Fine"	Wishclusive Contemporary R&B Performance of the Year	Nominated	
Yahoo OMG! Celebrity Awards	2014	It's Showtime	Female TV Host	Nominated	
Yahoo OMG! Celebrity Awards	2014	Karylle	Love Team of the Year (Shared with Vice Ganda.)	Won	
