= Mystified (film) =

2019 Filipino fantasy film

- Official release poster
- Directed by: Mark A. Reyes
- Written by: Mark A. Reyes; Marijoy Valenzuela; Glaiza Ramirez; David Martinez
- Starring: Iza Calzado; Karylle; Sunshine Dizon; Diana Zubiri
- Cinematography: A.B Garcia
- Edited by: Tara Illenberger
- Production companies: Sang'gre Productions, Inc.
- Distributed by: iflix
- Release date: March 29, 2019
- Running time: 86 minutes
- Country: Philippines
- Language: Filipino

Mystified is a 2019 Philippine fantasy film, directed and written by Mark A. Reyes, starring Iza Calzado, Karylle, Sunshine Dizon and Diana Zubiri. It was released on March 29, 2019, on iflix.

== Premise ==
The film is about the four witches namely Adela (Iza Calzado), Althea (Sunshine Dizon), Helena (Karylle), and Kathalina (Diana Zubiri) who descended from their kingdom of witchcraft and magic to fit in the mortal world and fight the devil forces.

== Cast ==
=== Main ===
- Iza Calzado as Adela "Addie"
- Sunshine Dizon as Althea "Thea"
- Karylle as Helena "Ena"
- Diana Zubiri as Kathalina "Kat"

=== Supporting ===
- Sunshine Cruz as Hellga
- Mostafa Elezali as Luvictus
- Cheska Iñigo as Devana
- Ian Ignacio as Aki
- Jinri Park as Zandra
- Leigh Guda as Violeta
- Caprice Cayetano as Kylie
- Ashley Sarmiento as Clara
- Jana Victoria as 1800s Hellga
- Matthias Rhoads as Miguel
- Vince Vandorpe as Javi
- Lexi Gonzales as Pauline

== Awards and nominations ==
Year	Awards	Category	Recipient	Result	Ref.
2019	Asian Academy Creative Awards	Best Visual or Special FX in TV Series or Feature Film	Mystified	Nominated	
2019	Asian Television Awards	Best Single Drama or Telemovie	Mystified	Won	
2019	Asian Television Awards	Best Original Digital Drama Series	Mystified	Nominated	
2019	Asian Television Awards	Best Direction (Fiction)	Mark A. Reyes	Nominated	
2019	Asian Television Awards	Best Theme Song	"Simula" by Karylle	Nominated	
