= Young JV =

Filipino entertainer

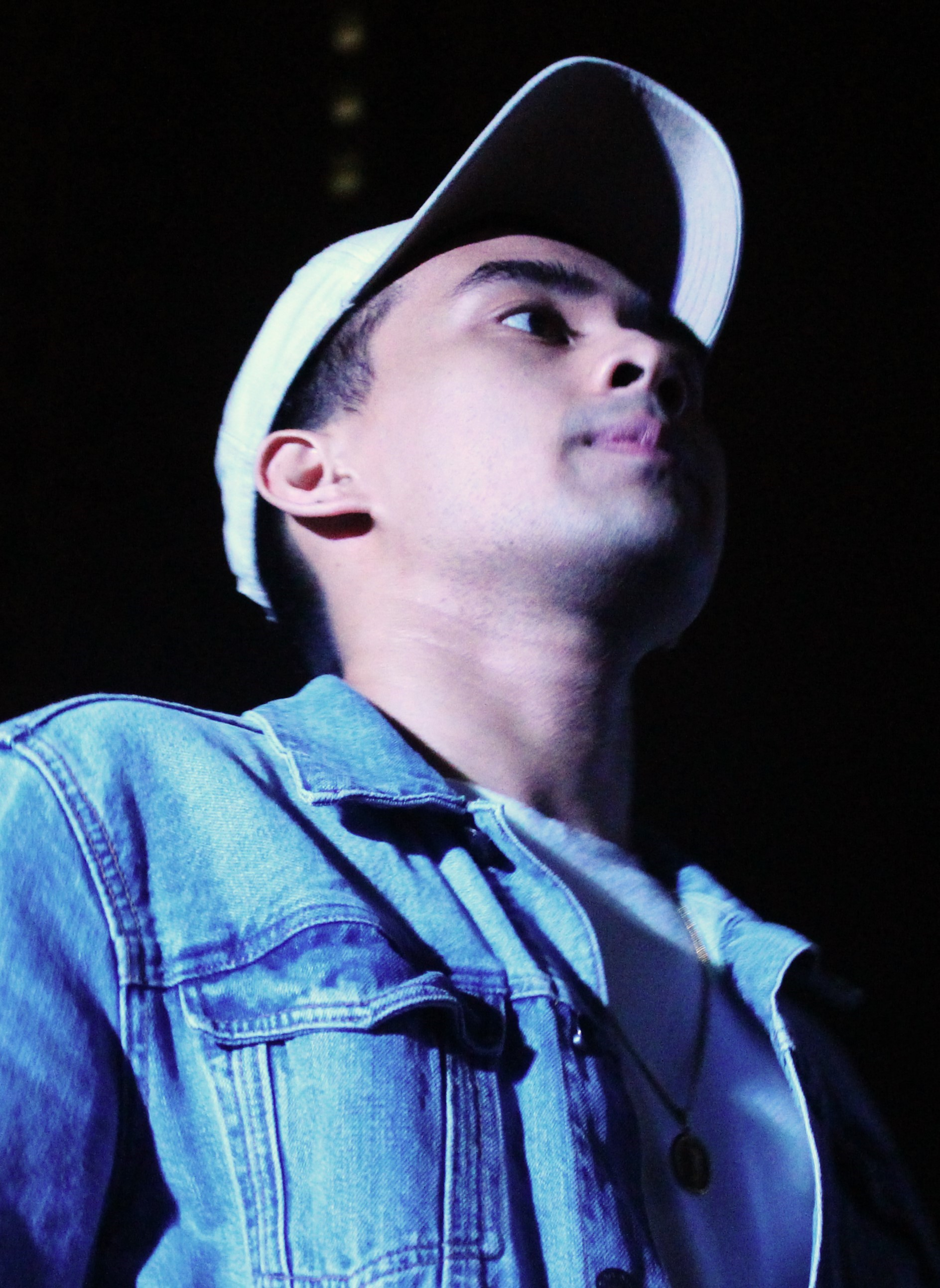
- Young JV in 2016

Background information
- Born: Eduardo JV Arancillo Kapunan III
- Origin: Iloilo, Philippines
- Genres: Hip hop, P-pop, R&B
- Occupations: Actor, recording artist
- Years active: 2008–present
- Labels: Doin' It Big Production (2008–present); PolyEast Records (2008–2012); Star Music (2012–present); Star Magic (2010–2021; 2023–present)
- Basketball career

Mindoro Tamaraws
- Position: Small forward / power forward
- League: MPBL

Career information
- Playing career: 2024–present

Career history
- 2024: Iloilo United Royals
- 2025–present: Mindoro Tamaraws

Eduardo JV Arancillo Kapunan III, known by his stage name Young JV, is a Filipino hip-hop recording artist, actor, and basketball player. He became famous for his first single in 2009, "That Girl" which was composed by himself. He produced his first album, Ready or Not under PolyEast Records and Doin' It Big Production. He performs on the variety show ASAP and is a member of an all-male group, A-pop, which is composed of JV himself, Sam Concepcion, Nel Gomez and Jaco Benin. He is a talent of ABS-CBN's Star Magic.

== Early life and background ==
Kapunan was born in Iloilo, Philippines. He grew up in a prominent family and exhibited early talent in both athletics and music before finding mainstream fame as a hip-hop artist. He began high school at Cambridge University in London and finished at St. Joseph School in Iloilo, later studying Comm Arts at the Entrepreneurs School of Asia.

== Career ==
He first appeared in ASAP 09 in the D-Lite segment where he performed with Nikki Gil, Toni Gonzaga and Karylle. Weeks after that episode, he had a duet with Sarah Geronimo singing his first single, "That Girl". The song had massive radio airplay. The music video was also premiered on Myx. The video for "Don't Know You" is directed by Treb Monteras III. His first album highlighted random songs from a night life of partying to inspirational stories based from his dad's experiences as a soldier.

In 2010, he promoted another single, "Shake Shake" which was the official song used for the said competition. The music video was shot in a bar where a party theme was emphasized.

In 2011, "Kaibigan Lang" was the last single released from his first album where they shot the video at ESA (the school where he studied in college) together with Myx VJ 2011 finalist, Cara Eriguel and celebrity appearances from Gabriel Valenciano and Arron Villaflor. In the same year, he released his new single, "Alay" from his second album where he collaborated with Star Power finalist, Akiko Solon. He made his acting debut in the romantic comedy film, Won't Last a Day Without You with Sarah Geronimo and Gerald Anderson as its lead stars. Also, he performed as a support act in the Gravity Tour date in the Philippines by Irish pop vocal band Westlife.

In 2012, he starred in the primetime drama teleserye, Princess and I where he plays Jonas de Ocampo, the guy who courts Dindi, and entangled in a love triangle with his best friend Kiko, played by Khalil Ramos.

On August 29, 2012, Young JV eventually released his second studio album, Doin' It Big under a signed contract with Star Music. The lead single of the album, "Your Name", featuring Myrtle Sarrosa, was eventually chosen as soundtrack for the movie 24/7 in Love. The second single from the album was "Tanong", a midtempo acoustic love song, which also had an accompanying music video. His album featured collaboration with other artists such as Karylle and Yeng Constantino He also made an appearance at Myx Mo! 2013 where he performed "Your Name" with Sarrosa, which received a nomination for Favorite Urban Music Video.

In February 2013, he performed with Zia Quizon, Abra and Bamboo at the opening night of the Himig Handog songwriting contest, held at the SM Mall of Asia Arena. JV tweeted and posted in social media through Twitter and Facebook that a new single will be released entitled, Ngiti (smile) featuring Gary Valenciano on August 25, 2013, that will serve as the lead single (4th over-all) of his repackage album called, Doin' It Big: Platinum Edition.

In 2014, he took part on the third Philippine Popular Music Festival with former South Border lead vocalist Duncan Ramos as the interpreters for the song entry "Hang Out Lang" written by Allan Feliciano and Isaac Garcia.

He released his first single in 2015 entitle, Ale from his third album, YJV, on June distributed worldwide by Star Music. February of the current year, he supported ABS-CBN Lingkod Kapamilya Foundation's eco-tourism and livelihood projects in Samar and Leyte, visited ALKFI's projects and had a concert for the Kapamilyas there. March – April, he'd been busy supporting Green Thumb Coalition for its Green Thumb Electoral Campaign with its mission of challenging the candidates to include environmental protection on their political agenda. Young JV and his team #YJVteam went all over the Philippines for this. July to September 2015, Young JV had 23 SM Supermalls Shows, promoting his YJV album. His second single Flashback feat. Emmanuelle was launched at MOR 91.1 Iloilo, October 2015 and its music video was premiered on MYX the following day and had a Twitter Party with Younglings (Young JV's Official Fans Club). We saw him December 2015 as "Tony" (Kathryn Bernardo's suitor) on Pangako Sa 'Yo (2015 TV series).

Young JV released his third single Got To Have You February 2016 and its music video is now hitting Pinoy MYX Countdown. June 2016 onwards, we saw him again on ABS-CBN Primetime Bida, featured on Born For You as "Mix". August 27, 2016 Young JV launched globally his new single Pasa Diyos featuring The Phenomenal Star Vice Ganda. This song with its music video is not only proactive in these times but inspirational. Pasa Diyos is available for download on iTunes, Amazon and Spotify, produced by Doin' It Big Production, distributed digitally worldwide by Star Music.

2017, Star Magic named him as JV KAPUNAN as he will focus more on his acting career. He was featured on La Luna Sangre as Joshua, the Mole Vampire on SupremoRichard Gutierrez's core vampires. He'd been also a part of Pusong Ligaw as Jake, one of Enzo Pineda's friends. But then again at the end of the day, JV still loves composing, producing and performing OPM songs. As trusted by his Manager and second dad, Mr. Johnny Manahan, JV composed the Star Magic's 25th Anniversary Theme Song, "Ikaw ang Magic ng Buhay Ko". He also had released his digital single,Kulay and was launched on ASAP CHILLOUT on the day of his birthday. Its music video featuring KissMarc (Kisses Delavin and Marco Gallo) was hitting MYX charts. As advocate, JV had joined TV Patrol's TPV30 several times. TPV30 is TV Patrol's way of giving back to our Kapamilya in the whole country, Philippines, in celebration of its 30th anniversary. In early 2018, JV collaborated with environmentalist and philanthropist Ms. Gina Lopez on a new advocacy project. This followed a joint appearance on the talk show Tonight with Boy Abunda with Miho Nishida in late 2017.

In 2026, Philippine action-drama series Blood vs Duty portrays the character of Rashid.

== Basketball career ==
In 2024, Kapunan joined his hometown Iloilo United Royals in the Maharlika Pilipinas Basketball League (MPBL).

== Achievements ==
- 2019: ABS-CBN Music's Spotify Wrapped: Most Streamed Track for the month of October 'Bet'
- 2019: Wave 89.1 Year End Countdown: #86 Ghost
- 2018: Wave 89.1 Year End Countdown: #88 123 feat. Miho
- 2018: Music Playlist 101 Sikat 50 OPM Hits: #33 123 feat. Miho
- 2017: PPop Awards 2017 Rising Pop Male Artist of the Year
- 2017: MOR 101.9 Pinoy Biga-10 Top 20 OPM Hits of 2017 "Kulay"
- 2017: Billboard PH's July 2017 Fresh Pick "Kulay"
- 2009: ASAP 09 Gold Record Awardee for "That Girl"
- 2009: Wave 89.1 1st Urban Music Awards, Best New Artist of the Year
- 2009: Monster Radio RX 93.1, Best New Artist of the Year at the Year-End Countdown
- 2010: Awit Awards, Best Performance by a New Male Recording Artist
- 2010: MYX Music Awards, Favorite New Artist
- 2011: Wave 89.1 2nd Urban Music Awards, Best Male Style Icon
- 2011: Wave 89.1 2nd Urban Music Awards, Best Music Video – "Can't Get Enough"
- 2011: ASAP Rocks Platinum Circle Awardee for Ready Or Not album
- 2013: ASAP 18 2Gold Record Awardee for "Doin' It Big" album

== Filmography ==
=== Film ===
Year	Title	Role
2011	Won't Last A Day Without You	Jeff

=== Television ===
Year	Title	Role
2009	Wowowee	Performer
2009	The Singing Bee PH	Player
2009–present	ASAP XP	Himself – Performer / co-host
2010	It's Showtime	Performer
2010	Shoutout!	Himself – Performer / Friend-thurs
2010	Pinoy Big Brother: Teen Clash 2010	Himself / Houseguest
2010	Pilipinas Got Talent	Himself / Performer
2011	Gandang Gabi, Vice!	Himself / Performer
2011–2012	Budoy	Captain
2012	Happy Yipee Yehey!	Himself / Performer
2012–2013	Princess and I	Jonas De Ocampo
2013	May Isang Pangarap	Host (cameo role)
2013	Maalaala Mo Kaya: Tsubibo	Ronnie
2013	Maalaala Mo Kaya: Singsing	Brother
2013–2014	Annaliza	Jacob
2014	Honesto	Greg Pascual
2014	Dyesebel	David
2015	Flordeliza	Dante
2015	Kapamilya, Deal or No Deal	Contestant - Briefcase Number 19
2015	Nathaniel	Benjamin
2015	Ipaglaban Mo: Tinalikurang Pangako	Eric
2015	Maalaala Mo Kaya: Banana Split	Classmate
2015–2016	Pangako Sa 'Yo	Tony
2016	Born for You	Mix
2017	Ipaglaban Mo: Laro	Coach
2017	Maalaala Mo Kaya: Sto Niño	Nonoy
2017–2018	Pusong Ligaw	Jake
2017–2018	La Luna Sangre	Joshua
2018	FPJ's Ang Probinsyano	Danny Nobleza
2018	Bagani	Farm Warrior
2018	Since I Found You	Simon
2018	Maalaala Mo Kaya: Sunflower	Edwin
2018	Ipaglaban Mo: Diploma	Jimmy Magtibay
2018	Maalaala Mo Kaya: Skateboard	Dani
2019	Ipaglaban Mo: Caregiver	Tristan
2022	ABS-CBN Christmas Special 2022: Tayo ang Ligaya ng Isa't Isa	Himself / Performer
2022–2023	Mars Ravelo's Darna	Andre Abesamis
2025	Sins of the Father	Rudy "Boying" Ortega
2025	It’s Okay to Not Be Okay	Dennis Menteroso
2026	Family Feud	Himself / Contestant
2026	Blood vs Duty	Rashid

== Discography ==
=== Studio albums ===
Release date	Title	Record Company	Sales	Certification	Ref.
July 25, 2009	Ready Or Not	PolyEast Records	PHL sales: 20,000+	PARI: Platinum	
August 29, 2012	Doin' It Big	Star Music	PHL sales: 10,000+	PARI:Gold	
June 23, 2015	YJV	Star Music	PHIL sales: 5,000		
January 4, 2021	Into The Darkness	Independent release			
