= List of Bukas na Lang Kita Mamahalin episodes =

== Series overview ==
Month	Episodes	Peak	Average Rating	Rank
September 2013	21	14.8% (Pilot Episode)	11.9%	—N/a
October 2013	23	14.1% (Episode 24)	12.6%	—N/a
November 2013	11	15.4% (Finale Episode)	12.7%	—N/a

== Episodes ==
=== September 2013 ===
Episode No.	Rating	Original Air Date	Timeslot Rank	Whole Day Rank	Source
1	14.8%	September 2, 2013	#1	#10	
Since he was young, Miguel (Gerald Anderson) has looked up to his father Martin (Gabby Concepcion), who works as chief of staff of a trustworthy public servant, Senator Renato Angeles (Noel Trinidad). Since he was young, Miguel has looked up to his father Martin, who works as chief of staff of a trustworthy public servant, Senator Renato Angeles. Suddenly, Martin finds himself caught in the middle of an insurmountable ordeal when he earns the blame for the senator's tragic death. With his wife Zenaida and Miguel by his side, Martin never loses the courage to fight for his innocence, but his efforts are put to waste when the court finds him guilty of the crime he did not commit. To make things even worse, Zenaida and Miguel suddenly lose Martin in an unfortunate incident that took place inside prison. Struggling to deal with the pain of losing his father, Miguel resorts to violent outbursts in his school.
2	13.9%	September 3, 2013	#2	#13	
In the wake of the tragedy that befell their family, Zenaida (Dawn Zulueta) is left helpless as she struggles to endure the burden brought by her husband's death. In the wake of the tragedy that befell their family, Zenaida is left helpless as she struggles to endure the burden brought by her husband's death. While helping his mother in this dire situation, Miguel faces a hard time accepting that his best friend Amanda is bound to be separated from him. As Zenaida and Miguel's problems pile up, Richard takes it upon himself to help the mother and son get back on their feet. Soon enough, Richard finds himself falling in love with Zenaida. Despite her apprehensions, Zenaida decides to give Richard a chance to be part of her life, devastating her son Miguel.
3	12.4%	September 4, 2013	#3	#14	
With the possibility of Miguel's expulsion after getting himself into trouble once again, Zenaida grows increasingly worried for her son. With the possibility of Miguel's expulsion after getting himself into trouble once again, Zenaida grows increasingly worried for her son. Upon learning of Miguel's predicament, Victoria urges her son Marcus to ensure Miguel's expulsion in hopes of hitting Zenaida where it hurts the most. Meanwhile, old flame ignites between Miguel and Amanda as the latter finally returns to the country to continue her studies. At Amanda's homecoming party, tension arises as Zenaida and Victoria chance upon each other.
4	13.9%	September 5, 2013	#1	#13	
5	11.6%	September 6, 2013	#2	#17	
Amanda (Cristine Reyes) inspires Miguel to become a better person as he starts to change his life anew. Amanda inspires Miguel to become a better person as he starts to change his life anew. However, a well-intended response to a friend's cry for help puts Miguel into trouble as he finds himself and Joaquin drunk and labelled obscene by a bar girl named Carla. The next morning, Miguel wakes up with no recollections of what happened during the rest of the night. Carla is found bruised and prostrated in the middle of a vacant lot in a remote area. With a rape case at hand, the police follow a lead directly to Zenaida's home.
6	11.6%	September 9, 2013	#2	#17	
Miguel finds himself caught in an insuperable ordeal when Carla (Diana Zubiri) confesses that he and Joaquin (Thou Reyes) raped her. Miguel finds himself caught in an insuperable ordeal when Carla confesses that he and Joaquin raped her. Fearing that he might suffer the same fate as his father, Miguel deems it right to escape the authorities. Believing that Miguel is innocent, however, Zenaida and Amanda prevent him from running away. Soon, Miguel musters the courage to surrender to the authorities and begins his own battle to prove his innocence and fight for his freedom.
7	10.6%	September 10, 2013	#2	#17	
After earning the blame for Carla's mishap, Miguel and his friend Joaquin end up in prison. After earning the blame for Carla's mishap, Miguel and his friend Joaquin end up in prison. To add up to Miguel's dismay, the authorities obtain a DNA sample from the victim that matches his own, supporting Carla's assertion that he was present during the assault. Taking it upon herself to help her son, Zenaida pays Carla a visit in hopes of convincing the latter to retract her accusations against Miguel.
8	11.7%	September 11, 2013	#1	#17	
Zenaida and Richard (Tonton Gutierrez) are confronted with a new problem after discovering that Victoria (Dina Bonnevie) and Jimmy (Rey PJ Abellana) have given their support to Carla. Zenaida and Richard are confronted with a new problem after discovering that Victoria and Jimmy have given their support to Carla. Dismayed at her father's decision to side the prosecution, Amanda assures Miguel that she will never leave him throughout this ordeal. Soon enough, Miguel once again faces the public as he undergoes his first trial. As the hearing ensues, Miguel finds himself on the verge of falling apart when Carla takes the witness stand and points him before the counsel as her assaulter.
9	11.1%	September 12, 2013	#3	#18	
As his way of taking the public's discrimination away from his stepson, Richard orders his employees to keep from writing articles favoring Miguel. As his way of taking the public's discrimination away from his stepson, Richard orders his employees to keep from writing articles favoring Miguel. This, however, causes pain to Zenaida, thinking that her own husband has turned his back on Miguel. While Zenaida continues to lobby for her son's freedom, Victoria proceeds with her vicious plan against the mother and son by urging Carla to gain the sympathy of a women's activist group. Inside prison, Miguel and Joaquin undergo a difficult time standing up against the other prisoners. Despite this, Miguel and Joaquin remain hopeful that they will overcome this test and soon earn freedom.
10	13.2%	September 13, 2013	#3	#14	
Zenaida and Miguel's hopes are strengthened as new evidences and Carla's admittance of taking drugs on the night she was raped shed light on the case in their favor. Zenaida and Miguel's hopes are strengthened as new evidences and Carla's admittance of taking drugs on the night she was raped shed light on the case in their favor. However, Miguel and Joaquin face the possibility of losing the promise of freedom as they hold their lives dear from the deadly threat of the other prisoners. In order to survive, Miguel makes a decision he does not like.
11	9.5%	September 16, 2013	#1	#23	
Miguel and Joaquin find their lives in great danger after discovering that the gang they have joined in carries out anomalous transactions involving illegal drugs. Miguel and Joaquin find their lives in great danger after discovering that the gang they have joined in carries out anomalous transactions involving illegal drugs. Meanwhile, Zenaida gets even with Victoria by putting the latter on the spot in front of the press people. Soon enough, the public finally hears Zenaida's side when she was given the chance to defend Miguel on national television.
12	11.4%	September 17, 2013	#2	#19	
Amid the crisis that Zenaida and Miguel are facing, mother and son see a spark of hope upon the arrival of Congressman Carlos Vilches (Dominic Ochoa), a politician who pledges to help Miguel fight for his freedom. Amid the crisis that Zenaida and Miguel are facing, mother and son see a spark of hope upon the arrival of Congressman Carlos Vilches, a politician who pledges to help Miguel fight for his freedom. Upon discovering that Zenaida has found a new supporter in her political rival, Victoria takes it upon herself to ruin the public's improving view on Zenaida's son by telling the media that Miguel is receiving special treatment in prison.
13	11.7%	September 18, 2013	#2	#18	
In hopes of finding more evidence that might clear Miguel's name, Zenaida and Amanda return to the bar where the rape incident took place. In hopes of finding more evidence that might clear Miguel's name, Zenaida and Amanda return to the bar where the rape incident took place. Luck favors them as they come across a street vendor who admits being present at the bar on the night of Carla's rape. In prison, Miguel finally frees himself and Joaquin from Jomar's clutch after succeeding to expose the latter's illegal agenda to the authorities.
14	11.7%	September 19, 2013	#3	#19	
The court finally gives its verdict on Miguel and Joaquin, finding the two guilty of rape and frustrated homicide. The court finally gives its verdict on Miguel and Joaquin, finding the two guilty of rape and frustrated homicide. While Zenaida and Amanda grieve over Miguel's conviction, Miguel starts a new battle as he and Joaquin find themselves surrounded by rogue criminals in a maximum security prison. With all the chaos happening in his life, Miguel comes to a painful decision to let go of Amanda in hopes of sparing her from all the pain.
15	10.7%	September 20, 2013	#3	#21	
While Zenaida puts a strain on her marriage because of her incessant campaign for Miguel's freedom, Miguel toughens his will to live as he and Joaquin endure Scorpio's hell. Miguel also puts an end to his relationship with Amanda, despite her insistence to stay by his side. Meanwhile, Victoria witnesses a disquieting first meeting between Marcus and Carol.
16	10.9%	September 23, 2013	#2	#19	
In her eagerness to get Miguel out of prison, Zenaida turns up at Victoria's birthday party despite Richard's disapproval. There, Zenaida gets herself in a humiliating state when Victoria tries to banish her from the party. Aside from Zenaida's unwanted presence, Victoria is further dismayed when Marcus admits to her that he saw Carla on the night of the latter's rape. Meanwhile, Miguel takes drastic actions in hopes of driving Amanda out of his life.
17	11.6%	September 24, 2013	#1	#20	
While Amanda decides to accept Marcus's (Rayver Cruz) love, Miguel's life is constantly placed in danger with his endless battle inside prison. Soon enough, Miguel ends the warfare between his fellow inmates by arranging a truce between the gangs. Just when things start to get better for him, Miguel finds himself holding on for dear life when his bitter rival Hudas enacts his ultimate retribution against him.
18	11.9%	September 25, 2013	#1	#19	
Zenaida discovers the harsh reality of her son's situation, where Miguel constantly fights for his life day after day behind prison walls. While Zenaida tries to revive the faith lost in her son, a riot that took place between his fellow Scorpio gang members prompts Miguel to return to jail. When Commander Nolan compromises his life during the standoff, Miguel takes on the responsibility to restore the peace destroyed by Hudas and his twisted beliefs.
19	—N/a	September 26, 2013	—N/a	—N/a	
Setting his eyes on getting even with Hudas (Michael Flores), Miguel seizes the perfect opportunity to expose the former's atrocious crimes to the authorities. With Hudas out of the picture, Miguel earns himself the position as the new commander of Scorpio gang. However, Miguel soon realizes that his anxieties are far from over when he discovers the painful truth about his father's death.
20	11.5%	September 27, 2013	#3	#21	
Through Benjie's (Ronnie Lazaro) account, Miguel confirms that his father was not killed in a riot but murdered under orders of powerful enemies. The information gives Miguel a whole new purpose to his imprisonment, believing that he was meant to find the real culprits and prove his father's innocence.
21	11.8%	September 30, 2013	#1	#16	
Amid his investigation about his father's murder, Miguel faces danger once again as a new inmate attempts to kill him. While Miguel survives another near-death experience, one of his loyal comrades breathes his last after coming to Miguel's rescue. With the turn of events, Miguel comes up with a decision to save his life. Meanwhile, despite Supt. Adanza's claim that Martin died in a riot, Zenaida continues to find evidences to uncover the truth behind her late husband's death.

=== October 2013 ===
Episode No.	Rating	Original Air Date	Timeslot Rank	Whole Day Rank	Source
22	13.4%	October 1, 2013	#2	#14	
Joaquin and Johnboy (Nico Antonio) decide to join Miguel in breaking out of jail. Soon, Miguel and his friends carry out a maneuver against a prison warden, oblivious that an inmate takes notice of their ploy. Getting suspicious of her son's recent actions, Zenaida follows Bart, Johnboy's brother, and soon finds out about Miguel's escape plan. Meanwhile, despite her growing rift with Victoria, Amanda endures living with her mother-in-law for the sake of Marcus.
23	13.5%	October 2, 2013	#1	#12	
Fearing for her son's safety behind bars, Zenaida resolves to help Miguel escape detention. Amid his dilemma about getting his mother involved in his maneuver, Miguel faces another difficulty as his inmate Kirat threatens to expose Miguel's escape plan to the prison wardens. Meanwhile, Carla's former co-worker blackmails Marcus into exposing his possible involvement in the rape case.
24	14.1%	October 3, 2013	#2	#13	
Using Kirat as decoy to divert the attention of the prison wardens, Miguel and his friends carry out their ploy to escape detention during the superintendent's birthday party. After personally bringing the getaway car to Miguel's instructed place, Zenaida prays for her son's safety and later finds a group of police officers in her house. Meanwhile, Marcus poses a threat to Ana's family in his desire to silence her in his involvement in Carla's case.
25	13.0%	October 4, 2013	#2	#19	
After ensuring Miguel's safety in his hideout, Zenaida senses impending trouble as the police officers consider that an accomplice made Miguel's escape possible. Now that Miguel is at large, Amanda and Marcus carry out necessary actions to cover up their longtime secret concerning Gabby's real identity.
26	12.4%	October 7, 2013	#1	#17	
Zenaida gets into an accident that pushes Miguel to get out of his hideaway. While Victoria finds ways to prove that Zenaida has something to do with Miguel's escape, Richard starts to wonder if his wife is hiding something from him.
27	13.8%	October 8, 2013	#1	#11	
Following his emotional reunion with Zenaida, Miguel bumps into Amanda and Gabby at the hospital. Miguel, on the other hand, develops a hunch after mulling over his unexplainable fondness for Amanda's son.
28	12.9%	October 9, 2013	#2	#15	
Amid the manhunt operation against him, Miguel puts his safety on the line once again to meet Henry Poblador, one of the three persons listed in Martin's book. Meanwhile, unmindful that Richard is getting suspicious of her actions, Zenaida finds an illicit way to ensure her fugitive son's safety.
29	12.4%	October 10, 2013	#2	#17	
After hiring someone to produce a fake passport for Miguel, Zenaida asks her son to leave the country as soon as possible. Meanwhile, Armando finds a lead about Miguel's possible reason for escaping detention.
30	10.8%	October 11, 2013	#1	#18	
Miguel's act of kindness leads Carla to think twice about the real culprits of her rape case. Carla faces a near-death experience in the hands of an assailant, until a familiar person comes to her rescue.
31	12.5%	October 14, 2013	#1	#15	
Unaware that Melchor orchestrated the recent attempt on Carla's life, Miguel asks Carla to stay with him in his hideout while they uncover the truth behind the rape case. Meanwhile, a childhood memory leads Marcus into thinking that Amanda still has feelings for Miguel.
32	12.0%	October 15, 2013	#1	#19	
While keeping Carla in his hideaway, Miguel sets off to find Congressman Gimeno, the former police officer who handled Carla's rape case. After refusing to disclose Miguel's whereabouts to Richard, Zenaida loses her temper at Victoria for continuously accusing Miguel of being a criminal.
33	12.0%	October 16, 2013	#1	#17	
After coming to Miguel's rescue, a wounded Johnboy faces captivity in the hands of Gimeno. While running away from their now unsafe hideout, Miguel and Carla come face to face with Armando.
34	11.0%	October 17, 2013	#2	#19	
Carla fabricates stories against Miguel as part of her ploy to gain Victoria's trust. While Gimeno uses Johnboy to catch Miguel, Armando finds something strange about Gimeno's involvement in Miguel's case and in Carla's recent accusations against Miguel.
35	10.3%	October 18, 2013	#2	#19	
After helping the authorities in entrapping Miguel, Johnboy asks for Miguel's forgiveness before an unexpected incident takes his life. As Richard opposes her plans of helping Miguel, Zenaida resolves to set her marriage aside for the sake of her son.
36	11.9%	October 21, 2013	#1	#15	
Thinking over the recent string of events, Miguel is convinced that Marcus is the real suspect in Carla's rape case. Later, however, Zenaida faces Armando and Elvis at the NBI office, leading her to another argument with Richard.
37	13.1%	October 22, 2013	#1	#14	
While spying on Marcus at a women's group assembly, Miguel runs into Amanda and admits his undying feelings for her. He also discloses that Marcus might be the one who raped Carla, which leads Amanda to further confusion. After Marcus nearly catches her with Miguel, Amanda comes across Miguel's fake passport. Meanwhile, Carla gets in trouble as Amanda accidentally hears her phone conversation with Miguel.
38	12.9%	October 23, 2013	#1	#13	
After asking Zenaida to let him settle his own problems, Miguel leaves an alarming note for Marcus, leading the latter to assume that it was his friend Alex who blackmailed him. Eavesdropping on their conversation, Miguel forces Marcus and Alex to admit raping Carla, but the police officers soon arrive to catch Miguel. Despite losing her job in Bantay Hustisya due to Victoria's accusations against her, Zenaida feels grateful to know that Richard has his ways of helping Miguel. Meanwhile, troubled with her feelings for Miguel, Amanda consults Jimmy about telling Marcus her recent discoveries on Miguel and Carla.
39	13.5%	October 24, 2013	#1	#11	
Anger gets the best of Marcus as he finds Miguel's passport in Amanda's keeping. While Marcus senses connivance between his wife and Miguel, Amanda considers giving up her marriage with Marcus after the latter hurts her and Gabby. Upon locating Alex's whereabouts, Miguel vows to make him and Marcus admit their offense. Meanwhile, Victoria finds Miguel's fake passport as a clear evidence against Zenaida. True enough, Zenaida faces the NBI agents holding a warrant of arrest against her.
40	11.3%	October 25, 2013	#1	#17	
Seeing Richard's undying support for Zenaida pushes Victoria to order the speedy process of Zenaida's criminal case. While Jimmy saves Amanda and Gabby from Marcus’ violent treatment, Marcus gets mad at Richard for always taking Miguel's side over his. Meanwhile, Miguel manages to hold Alex captive, and the sight of Alex brings Carla back to her traumatic experience in the hands of her rapists.
41	13.4%	October 28, 2013	#1	#12	
Carla recognizes Alex as one of her rapists, but the latter denies it and questions Miguel's innocence in the rape case instead. Soon, a group of police officers raids Miguel's hideout. While Marcus swears to do everything to get Amanda back, Zenaida resolves to work hand in hand with Armando in finding Jessica Tuazon. As the rape incident haunts him in his dreams, a confused Miguel considers the truth behind Alex's accusations.
42	13.0%	October 29, 2013	#1	#14	
Carla dismisses the possibility that Miguel is her rapist, for she admits that she has fallen for him. Still doubting his innocence in the rape case, Miguel desires to surrender to the authorities. Zenaida, however, convinces her son to think twice about his plan. Amanda resolves to give her marriage with Marcus another try. Meanwhile, trying to figure out Miguel's reason for abducting Alex, Armando and Elvis investigate on Alex's connection with Marcus.
43	14.2%	October 30, 2013	#1	#10	
Fearing that she might lose her son again, Zenaida asks Miguel to forget about his plan to surrender and to consider other options in finding the truth about the rape incident. Aside from thinking that Victoria might be using Miguel as a fall guy, Armando wonders if Miguel's criminal case has something to do with Sen. Angeles and Martin's case. As Carla plans to clear Miguel and Joaquin's name in the rape case, Melchor orders Marcus and Cong. Gimeno to silence Carla.
44	11.4%	October 31, 2013	#1	#16	
Richard meets with Armando in hopes of convincing the latter to help them find Jessica Tuazon. Meanwhile, a guilt-stricken Carla resolves to retract her statements against Joaquin and Miguel. After discovering Carla's betrayal, Victoria takes matters into her own hands by bribing the former P10 million in exchange for her silence. Carla, however, chooses to do the right thing by refusing to accept the money, consequently putting her and Lumen's life in jeopardy.

=== November 2013 ===
Episode No.	Rating	Original Air Date	Timeslot Rank	Whole Day Rank	Source
45	12.6%	November 1, 2013	#1	#10	
With Lumen taken hostage by Gimeno, Carla is left with no choice but to lure Miguel out of hiding and deliver him to her aunt's captors. Just as Carla requested, Miguel meets with her together with Armando.
46	12.9%	November 4, 2013	#1	#14	
Though frail because of the gunshot he obtained from Marcus, Miguel comes to Lumen's rescue but finds her wounded and unconscious. As the police arrive at the hideout, Melchor ends up in prison, but Marcus manages to escape. While Marcus puts a strain on his marriage as he tries to whitewash his involvement in Carla's rape case and Lumen's kidnapping, Miguel and Joaquin finally win their freedom as Carla retracts her statement against them.
47	13.6%	November 5, 2013	#1	#13	
Despite regaining the freedom they have longed for, Miguel and Joaquin still fear for their safety knowing that Victoria and her family might get back at them and that the real culprits remain at large. While fearing for his own life, Miguel also worries about Lumen who he considers as the key in solving the biggest puzzle of their lives.
48	13.7%	November 6, 2013	#1	#11	
A fake nurse's wrong move leads Miguel to discover the mastermind behind the recent threat to Lumen's life: Marcus. Fed up with Marcus’ lies, Amanda decides to leave with Gabby but soon finds herself struggling to escape Marcus’ clutches.
49	11.6%	November 7, 2013	#1	#15	
Trouble begins to pile up for the Antonios when Lumen rouses from unconsciousness and reveals Melchor's attempt to kill her and when Gimeno confesses his connivance with Melchor to cover up the real culprit in Carla's rape case. While trying to clean up Melchor's and Marcus’ mess Victoria gets the shock of her life when she learns about her son's most kept secret.
50	8.7%	November 8, 2013	#1	#21	
Victoria struggles to accept Marcus's confession of his crimes, but resolves to protect him at all costs. Seeing the silver lining at the horizon, Miguel continues to rally for the truth, and with Carla's help, convinces Congressman Gimeno to testify against the Antonios.
51	11.6%	November 11, 2013	#1	#14	
Gimeno puts an end to everyone's speculations as he finally reveals that Marcus raped Carla and narrates all of Marcus’ and Melchor's efforts to cover up the crime. Though deeply dismayed, Richard chooses to protect his son by tipping off Victoria that the NBI officials are all set to arrest Marcus.
52	13.1%	November 12, 2013	#1	#10	
53	12.9%	November 13, 2013	#1	#13	
54	13.3%	November 14, 2013	#1	#10	
55	15.4%	November 15, 2013	#1	#8	
Miguel continues to suspect Marcus' death. He and Zenaida crash Marcus' outdoor funeral and opens his coffin, that is filled with rocks and not Marcus. Storming to the field after seeing his mother get rocks thrown at her, Marcus holds his partner hostage threatening to kill him, but instead shoots Zenaida. Miguel goes on a chase following Marcus and Victoria. Marcus takes a dangerous, unsteady turn to an open field nearby. After anxiety attack, Victoria falls into a deep sleep in the SUV while Miguel pulls Marcus out of the vehicle which leads to a fight. While fighting, Marcus and Miguel shoot the gas tank of the SUV while both grasping onto Marcus' gun. Marcus slowly tries to aim and shoot Miguel, but fails his attempt while Miguel is quickly taking cover. Seeing the gas leaking, Marcus wakes up Victoria. Miguel returns while he kicks Marcus out of the way, which Victoria leaves the SUV too. Victoria is lying on the ground and Miguel is standing away from the SUV, while the police arrive and shoot Marcus. While Marcus is shot, the SUV starts catching on fire even more. Victoria gets up and runs to Marcus for him to take cover, but Miguel pushes Victoria out of the way, taking cover on the ground while the SUV explodes together with Marcus, who goes flying up into the air with the explosion. Marcus is finally dead while Victoria is on the ground crying and holding Marcus. The entire council, Victoria, and even Jimmy surrender and are put under arrest. Miguel and Amanda get married, while Carla catches Amanda's bouquet (which she is next to get married.)Everyone finally has a slow dance at the end, including Carla and Joaquin.
