= Doin' It Big (Young JV album) =

Studio album by Young JV
- Released: August 29, 2012
- Recorded: 2011–2012
- Genre: Pop, acoustic, OPM, R&B, hip hop
- Length: 40:04
- Language: English, Filipino, Tagalog
- Label: Star Recording, Inc.
- Producer: Malou N. Santos (executive); Roxy Liquigan(executive); EAK of DOIN' IT BIG Productions Inc.(executive)

Young JV chronology
Ready Or Not (2009)	Doin' It Big (2012)	YJV (2015)

Singles from Doin' It Big
- 1. "Alay (featuring Akiko)" Released: October 2011; 2. "Your Name (featuring Myrtle)" Released: October 4, 2012; 3. "Tanong" Released: January 5, 2013; 4. "Ngiti" Released: August 25, 2013; 5. "Get Up And Dance" Released: August 2, 2014

Doin' It Big is the second studio album of Filipino artist Young JV. It was released on August 29, 2012. This was his first album to be released under Star Records and Doin' It Big Productions. in CD and through digital download on iTunes, amazon.com, starrecords.com.ph, and the official nationwide music downloading cite in the country, mymusicstore.com.ph.

The album features ten original tracks in total. It was promoted by three singles, including hit songs "Alay" and lead single "Your Name". After the success of the lead single, "Tanong" was released as the third single.

== Background ==
It was reported by a publishing cite in the Philippines, philSTAR.com, that there will be lots more of his originals and star-powered collaborations in the new album. Among these are tracks with Yeng Constantino, Karylle and Akiko Solon. The latter is Alay, or offering, a song about unconditional love that is ideal for this Christmas Season. It is accompanied with a music video that began airing in late November 2011. This made a mark of idea to fans about the concept (of his second album) in which being distant from his 2009 album, Ready Or Not.

The album in this new recording label is extra-special for him as it presents the listeners everything that he can do as an artist. "We worked on it for a year and we basically did a lot of styles of music that the youth and young adults will surely appreciate–from hip hop, R&B, acoustic, house, and more. And through it, I was able to shows my different emotions," according to Young JV. Further, he is a stickler for writing original music, unlike some of his fellow artists, who are doing remakes of classic OPM hits. He also added when he is writing a song, “two to three week-long process.”

Doin' It Big was launched at noon-time musical variety show, ASAP on 29 October. After that, it was followed-up of several mall shows across his country home, the Philippines, to promote the album.

== Singles ==
"Alay" was the first single from the album and was released on November 25, 2011. It features singer Akiko. An accompanying music video was officially released on December 25. The version featured on the album had a different beat at the beginning.

"Your Name" was released on October 4, 2012, and is considered to be the lead single of the album. It features singer and actress, Myrtle Sarrosa, who won the fourth season of Pinoy Big Brother: Teen Edition. It was later used as the theme song for the romantic comedy movie 24/7 in Love.

"Tanong" was released on January 5, 2013. It is considered as the second single but is the third overall release from the album. It is a love song in midtempo, done acoustically. Young JV stated in an interview with Manila Bulletin, that he wanted to distance himself from "being just a hip hop, rap and R&B artist". A music video was released on March 18. To promote the single, Young JV appeared on an episode of ASAP which was held on Capiz Gym, Villareal Stadium, Roxas City, on the date of its release. He performed the song with Yeng Constantino.

"Ngiti" was released on August 25, 2013, as the fourth single included on the album's repackaged version titled, Doin' It Big: Platinum Edition. It features singer Gary Valenciano. JV and Valenciano performed the song for the first time at the noontime musical variety show ASAP 18 during the same day of its release on August 25, 2013. A different version of the song was later included on Valenciano's album, With You, which was released on February 11, 2014. In this album, Valenciano's vocals are more prominent than JV's.

"Get Up And Dance" is the fifth and last single off the album. It was released on August 2, 2014, which uploaded and announced through Facebook account of the singer. The music video of the said single premiered on 09/30/14 in his YouTube channel directed by Nolan Bernardino.

== Track listing ==
=== Doin' It Big ===
No.	Title	Writer(s)	Arranger(s), Producer(s)	Length
1.	"Intro"	Young JV	J. De Belen, Bojam	00:38
2.	"Get Up And Dance"	Alfaro	J. De Belen, Bojam and Thyro	04:16
3.	"Rock This Town" (featuring Laze and Yumi)	Young JV and Laze	T. Alfaro, Bojam	03:25
4.	"Your Name" (featuring Myrtle)	Young JV, T. Alfaro	J. De Belen, Bojam and Thyro	04:35
5.	"Kailan Kaya"	T. Alfaro	J. De Belen, Bojam	03:52
6.	"Tanong"	Marayah C.J. Valera	J. De Belen, Bojam	03:09
7.	"Boy Meets Girl" (featuring Yeng Constantino)	Young JV, Yeng Constantino	J. De Belen, Bojam and Yeng Constantino	03:34
8.	"Alay" (featuring Akiko)	T. Alfaro, Young JV	J. De Belen, Bojam	04:25
9.	"Got To Have You"	T. Alfaro, Young JV	A. Villaruel, AL-1 and Bojam	03:30
10.	"Hurts So Bad" (featuring Karylle)	J. Marcelo, E. Kapunan, K. Tatlonghari	Jungee Marcelo, Jungee Marcelo and Bojam	04:40
11.	"Pinas"	T. Alfaro	Bojam, Bojam and Thyro	03:50
Total length:				40:04

Notes

- Track 4, "Your Name" is the theme song of the film 24/7 In Love.
- Track 8, "Alay" translated in English as sacrifice or offering.
- Track 11, "Pinas" translated in English as the Philippines

== Personnel ==
- Malou N. Santos – executive producer
- Roxy Liquigan – executive producer
- EAK of DOIN' IT BIG Productions Inc. – executive producer
- Jonathan Manalo – A&R Manager
- Bojam of Flipmusic – co-producer
- Bojam and Thyro of Flipmusic – sound editors
- Roxy Liquigan – star adprom head
- Joel Ramos – music marketing and promotions strategies
- Gina Mauricio-Joyce - promo supervisor
- Zyra Cuenco – promo specialist
- Marivic Benedicto – star songs. inc. and new media head
- Beth Faustino – music publishing officer
- Abegail Aledo – music servicing coordinator
- Eaizen Almazan – new media technical assistant
- Regie Sandel – sales and distribution officer
- Andrew Castillo – creative head of album layout and design
- Xander Angeles – photographer
- Robert Dela Cruz – hair and make-up artist
- Joseph Robert Espiritu – stylist

== Certifications ==
Country	Provider	Certification	Sales
Philippines	PARI	Gold	PHL sales: 10,000+
