= Ready or Not (Young JV album) =

Ready Or Not

Studio album by Young JV
- Released: July 25, 2009
- Recorded: 2008–2009
- Genres: Hip hop, pop, R&B
- Length: 58:40 standard, 01:16:50 repackaged
- Label: PolyEast Records
- Producer: Doin It Big Productions

Young JV chronology
Ready Or Not (2009)	Doin' It Big (2012)

Singles from Ready Or Not
- 1. "That Girl" Released: May 2009; 2. "Don't Know You (featuring Heidi Riego)" Released: October 2009; 3. "Shake Shake Remix" Released: August 2010; 4. "Can't Get Enough" Released: August 2010; 5. "Back at Home (featuring Kyla)" Released: January 2011; 6. "Kaibigan Lang (Remix)" Released: April 2011

Ready Or Not is the eponymous debut studio album by Filipino artist, Young JV, produced and distributed by Doin' It Big Productions and PolyEast Records respectively. The album was released on July 25, 2009, in CD and digital download formats and a limited repackage edition CD + DVD was rereleased in 2011. Part of the Ready Or Not sales will be donated to the education of children whose soldier fathers perished in Mindanao. In November 2011, the album was certified platinum by PARI during the 7th ASAP Platinum Circle Awards 2011.

Young JV held an event called Ready or Not Dance-off in which a dance competition, that challenged dance crews to recreate and step up the choreography from his music video "Shake Shake." This event aimed to showcase the different talents of hip hop dance crew. In 2011, he releases "Back at Home" as his fifth single, exclusively in Japan.

== Background and production ==
During the interview of Young JV by Manila Bulletin Online and other member of the press, he explains why he wanted to create only OPM and be known by his talents. "I want to be known for what I can do and not as the son of my father," "And what I want is to be part of a movement that shows Filipino rap music is as good as those that come from the west."

== Track listing ==
=== Standard ===
No.	Title	Length
1.	"Ready Or Not"
2.	"That Girl"
3.	"Doin' It Big"
4.	"I Bet They Can't Do It Like That" (featuring Kris Lawrence)
5.	"Can't Get Enough"
6.	"Do The Snap"
7.	"The Way I Feel" (featuring Charmaine Kaye)
8.	"Kapayapaan" (featuring Marcus Davis Jr)
9.	"Can I Kick It" (featuring Slick n Sly Kane))
10.	"Don't You Know" (featuring Heidi Riego)
11.	"Lipad Noypi"
12.	"Kibigan Lang"
13.	"Ola Chica"
14.	"Shake Shake"
15.	"Outro"

=== Repackaged edition ===
Disc 1

No.	Title	Length
1.	"Ready Or Not"
2.	"That Girl"
3.	"Doin' It Big"
4.	"I Bet They Can't Do It Like That" (featuring Kris Lawrence)
5.	"Can't Get Enough"
6.	"Do The Snap"
7.	"The Way I Feel" (featuring Charmaine Kaye)
8.	"Kapayapaan" (featuring Marcus Davis Jr)
9.	"Can I Kick It" (featuring Slick n Sly Kane))
10.	"Don't You Know" (featuring Heidi Riego)
11.	"Lipad Noypi"
12.	"Kibigan Lang"
13.	"Ola Chica"
14.	"Shake Shake"
15.	"Outro"
16.	"Back at Home" (duet Kyla)

Disc 2 (DVD)

No.	Title	Length
1.	"Shake Shake"
2.	"Don't Know You"
3.	"That Girl"
4.	"Back at Home"
