= Diana Zubiri =

Filipina actress (born 1985)

- Born: Rosemarie Joy Garcia; April 15, 1985 (age 41); Bulacan, Philippines
- Occupation: Actress
- Years active: 2002–present
- Known for: Danaya in Encantadia; Carla Melendez in Bukas na Lang Kita Mamahalin; LilaSari in Encantadia (2016); Isabel in D' Originals
- Spouses: Alex Lopez (m. 2008; died 2010) Andy Smith (m. 2015)
- Children: 3

Rosemarie Joy Garcia-Smith (born April 15, 1985), known professionally as Diana Zubiri, is a Filipino actress. She began her acting career in the early 2000s when she starred in various erotic movies produced by Seiko Films. She is widely recognized for her role as Danaya in the 2005 fantasy drama series Encantadia.

== Early life and education ==
Rosemarie Joy Garcia is born on April 15, 1985, in Bulacan, Philippines. When she was six or seven years old, her father abandoned their family. Since then, her mother at Olongapo, who maintained a sari-sari store, took care of them. The family later transferred to Fairview, Quezon City and rented a house, where she stayed during her younger years. Her mother remarried and bore a child that became her halfsister.

Zubiri was a member of the Iglesia ni Cristo but later converted to Roman Catholicism during her early part of her show business career. She finished with a theater arts degree at Miriam College.

== Career ==
Zubiri was discovered by Seiko Films at the age of 15, years after applying for work in Japan as an entertainer. She later starred in various sexy films produced by the company. Zubiri became well known to the public in October 2002 when she posed atop the EDSA–Shaw flyover in Mandaluyong, wearing only a two-piece bikini for the men's magazine FHM Philippines. This photoshoot stirred controversy, leading the then-mayor of Mandaluyong, Benhur Abalos, to file charges against Zubiri and the magazine. However, the charges were later withdrawn following an apology.

In 2003, she became a semi-regular host in the noontime show Eat Bulaga! which lasted until 2005. She also became a mainstay on the long-running sketch-comedy show Bubble Gang until 2009.

Starting in 2005, she began taking on acting roles in various shows on GMA Network. Zubiri's major acting breakthrough came with the 2005 fantasy drama series Encantadia, where she portrayed Danaya, the diwata who holds the Jewel of the Earth. She later reprised the role in the spin-offs Etheria and Encantadia: Pag-ibig Hanggang Wakas. In 2007, Zubiri starred in the action-adventure series Asian Treasures alongside Angel Locsin and Robin Padilla.

When Seiko Films shut down in late 2007, Zubiri became a freelancer. By this time, she had retired from making adult-themed films, with her final one being in the film Silip alongside Polo Ravales and Francine Prieto. She appeared in her first Regal Films movie, Shake, Rattle & Roll X, a 34th Metro Manila Film Festival entry, and starred in One Night Only under OctoArts Films. She also appeared in the drama series Babangon Ako't Dudurugin Kita and Gaano Kadalas Ang Minsan? during this period.

After a two-year absence from both film and television, Zubiri made her return in 2010 with the comedy fantasy series Jillian: Namamasko Po. The following year, she appeared in several drama series, including Nita Negrita and Amaya.

In 2012, Zubiri signed a three-year exclusive contract with ABS-CBN. Notably, during her early career, she had applied multiple times to ABS-CBN's Talent Center before ultimately seeking opportunities in Japan. In March of that year, Zubiri won the Best Performer Award from the Young Critics Circle for her role in the indie film Bahay Bata, where she portrayed a nurse. The film also won the Jury Prize at the 2012 Deauville Asian Film Festival in France.

In 2013, Zubiri joined the cast of the action-fantasy series Juan dela Cruz. Later that year, she starred in the drama series Bukas na Lang Kita Mamahalin alongside Gerald Anderson, Dawn Zulueta, and Cristine Reyes.

After her contract with ABS-CBN expired in 2015, she returned to GMA Network, where she appeared in episodes of Karelasyon and joined the cast of the 2015 remake of Marimar. In 2016, she portrayed one of the major antagonists in the remake of Encantadia, the series she first starred in 2005. She continued to take on supporting and guest roles in various GMA series, including D' Originals, Super Ma'am, Victor Magtanggol, Cain at Abel, Dragon Lady, and Beautiful Justice.

Zubiri took a brief hiatus from acting but made her return to television in 2025, joining the cast of the drama series Mga Batang Riles.

== Personal life ==
On May 10, 2015, Zubiri married Australian businessman-model Andy Smith in New Manila, Quezon City. They have a daughter named Aliyah born on August 14, 2016. After giving birth to her third child in 2020, Zubiri and her family moved to Adelaide, Australia where the couple run a talent agency for a global social live-streaming platform.

Zubiri sold one of her souvenirs to Jayson Luzadas or Boss Toyo for $400 (₱23,417). The subject memorabilia is her donned bikini top and panties used in her controversial photo shoot at EDSA-Shaw flyover for FHM Philippines in October 2002.

== Filmography ==
=== Film ===
Year	Title	Role
2002	Itlog	Sally
2002	Bakat	Annie
2002	Kasiping	Rowena
2003	Liberated	Pauline
2004	Liberated 2	Fatima
2005	Bikini Open	Gail
2006	I Wanna Be Happy	Tish
2007	Silip	Tess
2008	One Night Only	Vivian
2008	Shake, Rattle & Roll X	Acacia
2011	Ang Mundo ni Andong Agimat	Alex
2012	Bahay Bata	Nurse Sarah
2014	Separados	
2014	Feng Shui 2	Woman
2016	Iadya Mo Kami	
2019	Mystified	Kathalina
2020	In the Name of the Mother	Rowena

=== Television / Digital series ===
Year	Title	Role	Notes
2003–2005	Eat Bulaga!	Herself	Host
2003–2009	Bubble Gang	Herself	Mainstay
2005	Perfect: An Eat Bulaga Lenten Special		Extended Cast
2005	Encantadia	Sang'gre Danaya	Main Cast
2005	Wag Kukurap: Food Trip/Caller	Claire	Lead Role
2005	Wag Kukurap: Signs/Immoral	Marie	Lead Role
2005	Bahay Mo Ba 'To?	Herself	Guest Appearance
2005–2006	Etheria: Ang Ikalimang Kaharian ng Encantadia	Reyna Danaya	Lead Role
2006	Encantadia: Pag-ibig Hanggang Wakas	Reyna Danaya	Lead Role
2006	Ang Pagbabago	Herself	Host
2006	Now and Forever: Linlang	Divina Agustin	Supporting Cast
2007	Asian Treasures	Ingrid Vargas / Urduja	Main Cast
2007–2008	Zaido: Pulis Pangkalawakan	Carmela Langit / Princess Arianna of Avea / Arianna Impostor	Main Cast
2008	Babangon Ako't Dudurugin Kita	Julie Maceda-San Juan	Main Cast
2008	Sine Novela: Danny Zialcita's Gaano Kadalas Ang Minsan	Elsa Cervantes-Almeda	Main Cast / Antagonist
2008	Dear Friend	Various Roles	Lead Role
2010–2011	Jillian: Namamasko Po	Francine Sanchez	Lead Role
2011	Nita Negrita	Danica	Supporting Cast / Antagonist
2011	Futbolilits	Florentina	Extended Cast
2011	Spooky Nights: Parol	Ayra	Lead Role
2011-2012	Amaya	Kapid	Extended Cast
2012	Maalaala Mo Kaya: Apoy	Yoli	Lead Role
2012	Wansapanataym: Wansapana-Ride	Madelyn Versoza	Lead Role
2013	Juan dela Cruz	Peru-ha / Saragnayan	Supporting Cast / Primary Antagonist
2013	Toda Max	Alex	Extended Cast
2013	Bukas na Lang Kita Mamahalin	Carla Melendez	Main Cast / Anti-Hero / Protagonist
2014	Ipaglaban Mo: Akin ang Asawa Ko	Marjorie	Lead Role
2014	Home Sweetie Home	Susie Samonte	Main Cast
2015	Mac and Chiz	Jaya	Guest Appearance
2015	Baker King	Sonia San Miguel	Supporting Cast
2015	Wagas: Terry and Jonjon Love Story	Terry	Lead Role
2015	Karelasyon: Cougar	Lara	Lead Role
2015	Karelasyon: Status Symbol	Trixie	Lead Role
2015–2016	Marimar	Julianna Corcuera-Aldama	Extended Cast / Antagonist
2016	Dear Uge: Faking Girls	Lani De Vera	Lead Role
2016–2017	Encantadia	LilaSari	Main Cast / Antagonist / Protagonist
2017	Magpakailanman: Justice for the Battered Child	Linda	Lead Role
2017	Magpakailanman: OFW on Death Row	Sally Ordinario-Villanueva†	Lead Role
2017	Karelasyon: Magnanakaw ng Puso	Monet	Lead Role
2017	D' Originals	Isabel "Sabel" Buenaventura	Extended Cast / Antagonist / Protagonist
2017	Daig Kayo ng Lola Ko: Hans, Gretchen, and the Witch	Mama	Supporting Role
2017	Wagas: Ghost	May	Lead Role
2017	Tadhana: Ang Batang Refugee	Melinda	Lead Role
2017	Dear Uge: Gulaman of My Dreams	Myrna	Lead Role
2017	Super Ma'am	Gilda "Jill" Magpantay	Extended Cast / Antagonist
2017	Magpakailanman: Best Sisters Forever	Linsie	Lead Role
2018	Magpakailanman: A Ghost From My Past	Jade	Lead Role
2018	Wagas: Lola Iska	Iska	Supporting Role
2018	Stories for the Soul: Maghihintay ang Walang Hanggan	Leila	Lead Role
2018	Victor Magtanggol	Freya	Special Participation
2018	Cain at Abel	Young Precy	Guest Cast / Antagonist
2018	Tadhana: Linlang	Leslie	Lead Role
2019	Tadhana: Tatlong Panganay	Joyce	Lead Role
2019	Dragon Lady	Almira Sanchez-Atienza / Lavender Del Fuego	Supporting Cast / Protagonist
2019	Stories for the Soul: Uhaw na Tubig	Kathy	Lead Role
2019	Dear Uge: Kalma Mama	Maya	Lead Role
2019	Beautiful Justice	Athena "Queen A" Vergara	Guest Cast / Antagonist
2019	Magpakailanman: Yuki	Debbie	Lead Role
2020	Tadhana: Bayad Danyos	Rona	Lead Role
2024–2025	Bblgang	Herself	Guest Appearance
2025	Mga Batang Riles	Mariana "Maying" Asuncion	Supporting Cast / Protagonist
2025–2026	Encantadia Chronicles: Sang'gre	Kambal-Diwa Harahen	Guest Cast

== Awards and recognition ==
=== FHM ranking ===
Zubiri made her first appearance in FHM Philippines in June 2002 as one of the "Girls of FHM." Just six months later, she became a cover girl for the magazine, posing on the EDSA-Shaw Boulevard flyover. She appeared in an FHM calendar alongside Maui Taylor and Aubrey Miles. She also appeared in the FHM editions of Thailand, Singapore, and Indonesia.

In September 2014, Zubiri returned to the FHM cover for the fourth time as part of a special four-part series, alongside Rachel Anne Daquis, Myrtle Sarrosa, and Andrea Torres.

For 14 consecutive years, Zubiri consistently ranked in the magazine's annual 100 Sexiest Women in the World list. She topped the list in 2003 where she was hailed the FHM Philippines' Sexiest Woman.

Year	Award	Category	Result	Won by
2002	FHM Philippines	100 Sexiest Women of the World	Ranked # 90	Assunta de Rossi
2003	FHM Philippines	100 Sexiest Women of the World	Ranked # 1 PH Finest	Herself
2004	FHM Philippines	100 Sexiest Women of the World	Ranked # 3	Cindy Kurleto
2005	FHM Philippines	100 Sexiest Women of the World	Ranked # 4	Angel Locsin
2006	FHM Philippines	100 Sexiest Women of the World	Ranked # 4	Katrina Halili
2007	FHM Philippines	100 Sexiest Women of the World	Ranked # 7	Katrina Halili (2)
2008	FHM Philippines	100 Sexiest Women of the World	Ranked # 5	Marian Rivera
2009	FHM Philippines	100 Sexiest Women of the World	Ranked # 13	Cristine Reyes
2010	FHM Philippines	100 Sexiest Women of the World	Ranked # 16	Angel Locsin (2)
2011	FHM Philippines	100 Sexiest Women of the World	Ranked # 23	Sam Pinto
2012	FHM Philippines	100 Sexiest Women of the World	Ranked # 37	Sam Pinto (2)
2013	FHM Philippines	100 Sexiest Women of the World	Ranked # 54	Marian Rivera (2)
2014	FHM Philippines	100 Sexiest Women of the World	Ranked # 27	Marian Rivera (3)
2015	FHM Philippines	100 Sexiest Women of the World	Ranked # 19	Jennylyn Mercado

=== Other awards ===
On June 27, 2012, Zubiri accepted her Young Critics Circle award for Best Performance at the ceremony held at the University of the Philippines.

Year	Film Award/Critics	Award/Nomination/Category	Nominated work	Result
2012	Young Critics Circle award	Best Performance by Male or Female, Adult or Child, Individual or Ensemble in Leading or Supporting Role	Bahay Bata	Won
2012	35th Gawad Urian Awards	Best Actress	Bahay Bata	Nominated

Preceded by Beauty Gonzalez	FHM Cover Girl (September 2014)	Succeeded by Rachel Anne Daquis
