= Catholic Mass Media Awards =

- Awarded for: Technical excellence and promotion of human values in mass media
- Country: Philippines
- Presented by: Catholic Mass Media Awards Foundation
- First award: 1978; 48 years ago
- Website: cmmafoundation.com

The Catholic Mass Media Awards (CMMA) is an annual honors established by the Archdiocese of Manila to recognize figures and organizations in the mass media industry of the Philippines.

== History ==
The Catholic Mass Media Awards (CMMA) was instituted in 1978 by the Roman Catholic Archdiocese of Manila under Cardinal Jaime Sin under his capacity as Manila Archbishop. It is meant to honor figures and groups in print, television, radio, and film. In 1979, advertising was added as the fifth category. In 1980, music was included as a new category.

In 1981, Pope John Paul II personally handed the CMMA recipients their trophies. In 1992, the CMMA has explicitly stated its mission to recognize awardees for their technical expertise and promotion of "human values". Pope John Paul II, who was visiting the Philippines for World Youth Day 1995 once again personally conferred the awards at the Philippine International Convention Center.

No CMMA was held in 1998 and 1999. It returned again in 2000. In 2001, the first Student CMMA and CMMA Media Fair was introduced. The internet category was also introduced in the main awards.

== Awards ==
According to Cardinal Sin, the Catholic Mass Media Awards is meant as "a tribute to those who are serving God through media." It recognize technical expertise in media as well as efforts it deems sufficient in promoting human values—Christian and Filipino values. The former is defined as "love of God, life and truth, and respect for the environment". A winner does not need to be Catholic, or any other Christian.

Special awards

- Serviam Award – given to recipients who "effectively transmit Christian values in media-based programs and projects".
- Hall of Fame – an individual or entity which has won a category five consecutive times.
- Pope John Paul II Award – given to recipients who "utilizes the mass media in creative ways in his or her evangelical service".
