= Moments of Love =

- A classic tale of romance between two individuals living in a different time
- Directed by: Mark A. Reyes
- Screenplay by: Gina Marissa Tagasa
- Story by: Annette Gozon-Abrogar
- Produced by: Jose Mari Abacan; Annette Gozon-Abrogar
- Starring: Dingdong Dantes; Iza Calzado; Karylle
- Cinematography: Jay Linao
- Edited by: Marya Ignacio
- Music by: Nonong Buencamino
- Production company: GMA Films
- Distributed by: GMA Films
- Release date: March 29, 2006
- Running time: 104 minutes
- Country: Philippines
- Language: Filipino
- Box office: ₱100 million

Moments of Love is a 2006 Philippine romance film directed by Mark Reyes from a screenplay written by Gina Marissa Tagasa, based on an original story by the film's producer, Annette Gozon-Abrogar. The film stars Dingdong Dantes, Iza Calzado and Karylle.

== Plot ==
Marco (Dingdong), a photographer, along with his sister (Isabel) and their cousin Duke (Jojo) are on a vacation in an old sleepy town. While strolling around town a mysterious woman is hit by a van while trying to save Marco's life. He visits the woman and is drawn to her granddaughter Lianne (Karylle). Marco and Lianne start to develop a relationship but recent events cause Marco to be withdrawn. He suddenly finds himself haunted by a deep feeling of loneliness.

His yearning leads to a telephone conversation with Divina (Iza), the daughter of a haciendero. They find solace in each other. Divina lives in the past (1957) while Marco lives in the present (2006).

== Cast ==
- Dingdong Dantes as Marco - A photographer from 2006 who is on vacation with his sister and cousin while his parents are in London. He gets to know Divina through the mysterious phone in his room, which is Divina's old room.
- Iza Calzado as Divina Buenacer - The daughter of a haciendero from the 1950s. She loves to paint. She gets to know Marco through the mysterious phone in her room.
- Karylle as Lianne - Rosa Santos' (Later revealed to be Divina) young granddaughter. Her grandmother's accident leads her to meet Marco.
- Gloria Romero as Rosa Santos/old Divina - Lianne's grandmother who is actually Divina. She is renamed Rosa Santos by her kind husband who is the captain of the ship that sunk when Divina tried to go to Manila.
- Chinggoy Alonzo as Señor Andres Miguel Buenacer - Divina's father who decides to betroth his daughter to Juancho, who is Divina's childhood friend, but later backs out on the agreement after he realizes that his daughter is unhappy.
- Ces Quesada as Señora Amelia Buenacer - Divina's mother who thinks that her daughter should marry for love.
- Ian Veneracion as Captain Ricardo Santos - Divina's kind husband, whom she meets after he saves her from their ship (which was bound for Manila) sunk. He is also the one who renamed the amnesia stricken Divina, Rosa Santos.
- Paolo Contis as Juancho - Divina's fiancé and childhood friend. He does everything in his power to try to make Divina his.
- Isabel Oli as Ava - Marco's sister who becomes concerned when her brother suddenly acts strangely. She falls in love with Kiko, Ceding's grandson.
- Dion Ignacio as Kiko - Ceding's grandson, who helps his grandmother take care of the Buenacer villa. He falls in love with Ava, Marco's sister.
- Sandy Andolong as Elma
- Jojo Alejar as Duke - Marco and Ava's witty cousin. Once a famous actor and director, he is trying to make a comeback to save his failing career.
- Ama Quiambao as old Ceding - Kiko's grandmother who is the caretaker of the Buenacer mansion.
- Valerie Concepcion as young Ceding - Divina's best friend and confidante, she is the maid of the Buenacer's and remains loyal to them even in 2006, during which she converted the villa into a bed and breakfast for travelers as a means to take care of the villa.

== Soundtrack ==
Moments of Love

Soundtrack album by Various artists
- Released: February 14, 2006
- Recorded: 2006
- Genre: Pop
- Label: GMA Records

Accompanying the movie is its soundtrack, released on February 14, 2006, on GMA Records.

=== Track listing ===
All music is composed by Nonong Buencamino.

No.	Title	Performer(s)	Length
1.	"Moments Of Love Suite"	Nonong Buencamino	4:04
2.	"Moments Of Love" (Orchestra)	Jennylyn Mercado, Janno Gibbs	4:18
3.	"Sana'y Maghintay Ang Walang Hanggan"	Karylle	3:56
4.	"Moments Of Love" (Vocal)	Brenan Espartinez, Charmaine Piamonte, Michael Garcia	5:06
5.	"Sana'y Maghintay Ang Walang Hanggan"	Alvin Nunez	3:56
6.	"Moments Of Love" (New Age)	Agatha Obar	4:36
7.	"Marco"	Nonong Buencamino	3:53
8.	"Give Me One More Chance"	Sipol	3:03
9.	"Moments Of Love" (Instrumental)	Nonong Buencamino	3:51

== Awards and nominations ==
- Nominated and awarded a Certificate of Excellence in the 2006 New York Festival Film and Video Awards.

== Spin-off ==
A spin-off film titled Moments of Love: On Borrowed Time was announced on January 1, 2025 as part of GMA Network's 2025 offerings with Director Mark Reyes returning.
