= Mark A. Reyes =

Filipino film director, TV director, music video director and film writer

Mark A. Reyes V
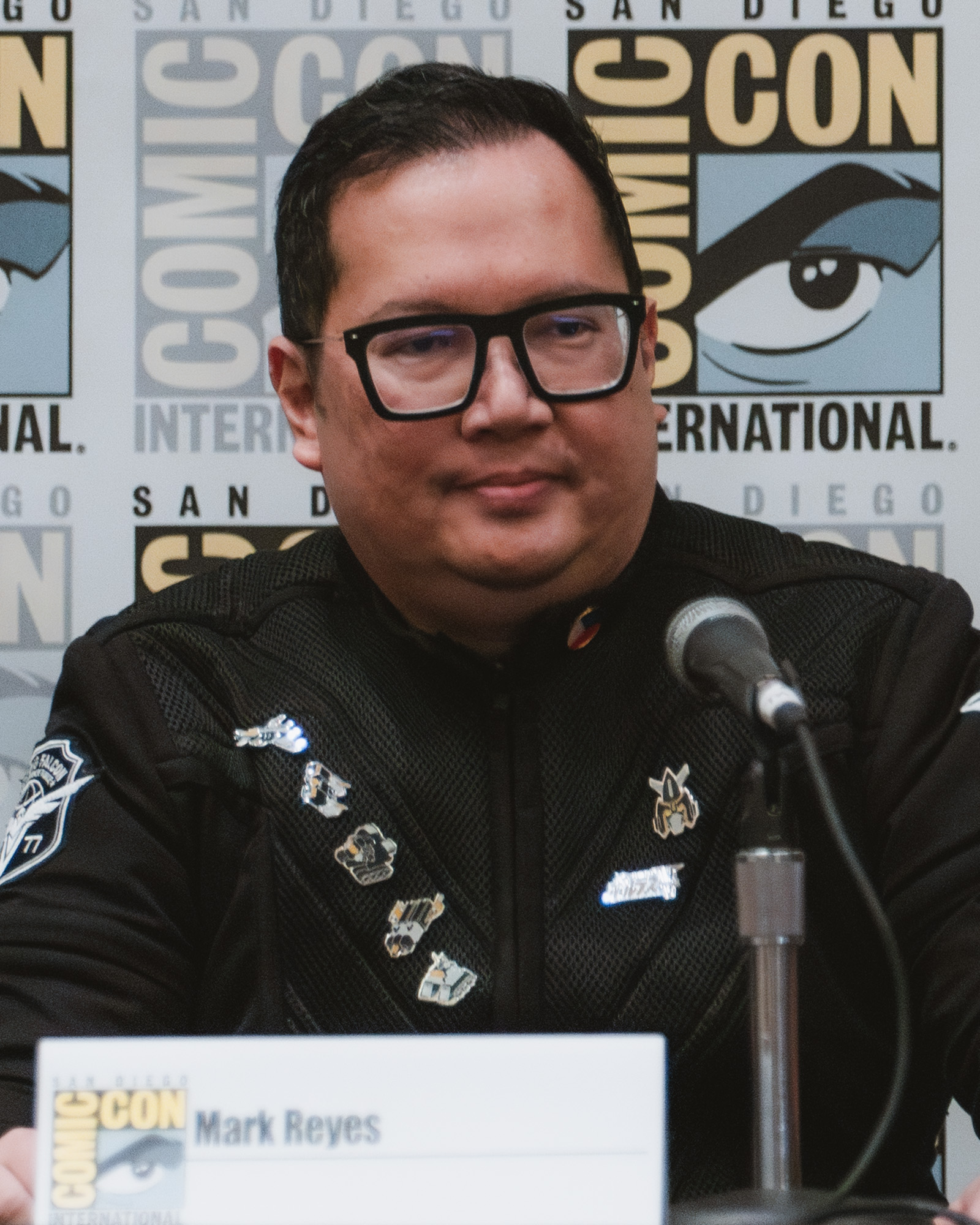
- Reyes in 2023
- Born: March 28, 1969 (age 57); Philippines
- Education: De La Salle University Communication Arts
- Occupations: Film, television and music video director
- Years active: 1995–present
- Employer: GMA Network

Marciano "Mark" Arcega Reyes V (born March 28, 1969) is a Filipino film, television and music video director and film writer known for his multi-stranded storylines. He is a resident director and writer of GMA Network.

His work include the film Moments of Love and television series Encantadia, which have both won several awards from various festivals including the New York TV & Film Festival. He is the uncle of the Kapuso actress, Terry Malvar and the nephew of veteran film and television director and writer Jose Javier Reyes, Chairperson of the Film Development Council of the Philippines.

== Filmography ==
=== Television ===
- 1995–1999: T.G.I.S.
- 1997–1999: Growing Up
- 1999–2000: Pintados
- 2003–2006: Love to Love
- 2004: Hanggang Kailan
- 2004–2005: Forever in My Heart
- 2005: Encantadia
- 2005–2006: Etheria
- 2006: Encantadia: Pag-ibig Hanggang Wakas
- 2006–2007: Atlantika
- 2007: Philippine Idol
- 2007–2008: Kamandag
- 2008: Codename: Asero
- 2009: Zorro
- 2009: SRO Cinema Serye Suspetsa
- 2009–2010: Full House
- 2010: Party Pilipinas
- 2010: Ilumina
- 2011–2012: Bagets: Just Got Lucky
- 2011: Time of My Life
- 2012: Eat Bulaga! (on Saturdays)
- 2012: Alice Bungisngis and Her Wonder Walis
- 2012: Kasalanan Bang Ibigin Ka?
- 2012–2013: Paroa: Ang Kuwento ni Mariposa
- 2012–2013: Teen Gen
- 2013: Love & Lies
- 2013: Genesis
- 2014: Paraiso Ko'y Ikaw
- 2014–2016: The Half Sisters
- 2015–2016: Because of You
- 2016–2019: Sunday PinaSaya
- 2016–2017: Encantadia
- 2017–2018: My Korean Jagiya
- 2018: The Cure
- 2018–2019: Cain at Abel
- 2019: Inagaw na Bituin
- 2019–2020: Beautiful Justice
- 2022: Agimat ng Agila (Book 2)
- 2023: Voltes V: Legacy
- 2023: The Missing Husband
- 2024: "My Very Special Son: The Candy Pangilinan Story"
- 2025: Encantadia Chronicles: Sang'gre (replaced in November 2024 by Rico Gutierrez and Enzo Williams).

=== Film ===
As director

- 1996: T.G.I.S.: The Movie
- 1998: Silaw
- 2005: Mulawin: The Movie
- 2006: Moments of Love
- 2006: Eternity
- 2006: Till I Met You
- 2007: Angels (segment: Angel of Love)
- 2007: Tiyanaks
- 2007: Resiklo
- 2008: My Bestfriend's Girlfriend
- 2008: I.T.A.L.Y.
- 2010: Andong Agimat
- 2010: You to Me Are Everything
- 2011: Tween Academy: Class of 2012
- 2017: Trip Ubusan: The Lolas Vs. Zombies
- 2023: Voltes V: Legacy –The Cinematic Experience
- 2024: Playtime

As writer

- 1998: Tiyanaks (written by)
- 2006: Moments of Love (story)
- 2007: Tiyanaks (story)
- 2007: Resiklo (screenplay)

Web film

- 2019: Mystified
