= Wag Kukurap =

Philippine television reality show

- Title card
- Also known as: Don't Blink
- Genre: Reality show; Horror
- Directed by: Jun Lana
- Presented by: Dingdong Dantes
- Country of origin: Philippines
- Original language: Tagalog
- No. of episodes: 86

Production
- Executive producer: Wilma Galvante
- Camera setup: Multiple-camera setup
- Running time: 15–34 minutes
- Production company: GMA Entertainment TV

Original release
- Network: GMA Network
- Release: August 28, 2004 – April 29, 2006

Wag Kukurap (transl. / international title: Don't Blink) is a Philippine television reality horror show broadcast by GMA Network. Directed by Jun Lana, it is hosted by Dingdong Dantes. It premiered on August 28, 2004. The show concluded on April 29, 2006, with a total of 86 episodes.

The show is streaming online on YouTube.

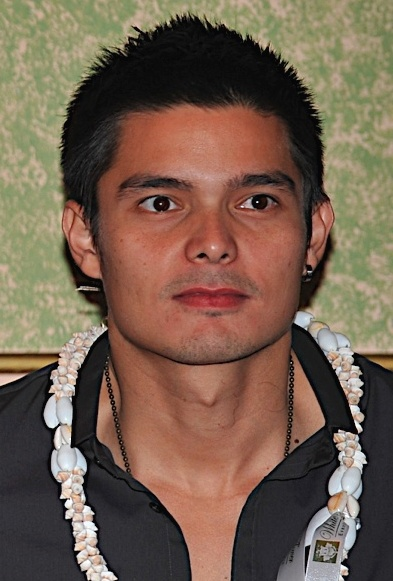
Dingdong Dantes serves as the host.
