= List of Philippine films of the 2000s =

This is a list of films produced in the Philippines in the 2000s.

== 2000 ==
Title	Director	Cast	Genre	Studio
2000
Abandonada	Joel Lamangan	Maricel Soriano, Edu Manzano, Angelu de Leon	Drama	Viva Films
Akin ang Labang Ito	Baldo Marro	Ace Espinosa, Eddie Gutierrez, Ynez Veneracion, Michael de Mesa, Ramon Christopher	Action	ATB-4 Films
Anak	Rory B. Quintos	Vilma Santos, Claudine Barretto	Drama	Star Cinema
Alipin ng Tusko	Rico Tariman	Halina Perez, Allona Amor, Roy Alvarez, Leo Rabago, Pamela Ortiz, Harold Pineda	Crime, erotic drama, romance	Leo Films
Ang Dalubhasa	Fernando Poe Jr.	Fernando Poe Jr., Nanette Medved, Maritoni Fernandez	Action	Millennium Cinema
Anghel Dela Guardia	William G. Mayo	Jeric Raval, Isabel Granada, Jimwell Stevens, Brando Legaspi, Mon Confiado, Vhong Navarro	Action, fantasy	Regal Films
Arayyy	Don Escudero	Nini Jacinto, Ana Capri, Rodel Velayo, Leonardo Litton, Simon Ibarra, Manny Castañeda, Rustica Carpio, Jackie Castillejo, Ruby Solmerano, Justine Moreno	Erotic drama	Available Light Production; Seiko Films
Baliktaran	Baldo Marro	Zoren Legaspi, Tonton Gutierrez, Assunta de Rossi	Action	Regal Films
Basta Tricycle Driver... Sweet Lover	J.R. Ledesma	Dennis Padilla, Smokey Manaloto, Aya Medel	Comedy	MMG Entertainment International
Bastardo	Pepe Marcos	Ian Veneracion, Ina Raymundo, Raymond Bagatsing, Mark Gil, Ramon Christopher	Action	OctoArts Films, Cinemax Studios
Birthday Gift 2	Cesar S.B. Abella	Sabrina M., Rey Abellana	Erotic drama	El Niño Films
Biyaheng Langit	Tikoy Aguiluz	Joyce Jimenez, Mark Anthony Fernandez, Nida Blanca, Bembol Roco, John Arcilla, Cholo Escano, Susan Africa, Christian Alvear, RJ Leyran, Shermaine Santiago	Romance	Viva Films
Buhay Kamao	Joyce E. Bernal	Robin Padilla, Joonee Gamboa	Action	Viva Films
Buhay na Manikin	Robert Delos Reyes	Hazel Espinosa, Jasmine Tolentino, Harold Morales, Erwin Montes, Lyra Lorena	Erotic drama	N/A
Burador (Ang Babaeng Sugo)	Harry James	Jess Lapid Jr., Gabriel Romulo, Mandy Ochoa, Trovador Ramos Jr., King Gutierrez, Kier Legaspi, Sandra Gomez, Trovador Ramos Sr., Lucita Soriano	Action	Manoli Films
Col. Elmer Jamias: Barako ng Maynila	Toto Natividad	Jinggoy Estrada, Angelu De Leon, John Regala	Action	Millennium Cinema
Daddy O, Baby O!	Enrico S. Quizon	Dolphy	Comedy	Star Cinema
Deathrow	Joel Lamangan	Eddie Garcia, Cogie Domingo, Angelika dela Cruz	Drama, crime	GMA Films
'Di Ko Kayang Tanggapin	Willy Milan	April Boy Regino, Ciara Sotto, Manilyn Reynes, Manny Pacquiao, Mikey Arroyo, Trovador Ramos Jr., Precious Valencia	Drama, romance	World Arts Cinema
Eto Na Naman Ako	Ike Jarlego Jr.	Robin Padilla, Vina Morales, Troy Montero	Action	Millennium Cinema
Ex-Con	Toto Natividad	Victor Neri, Rica Peralejo, Noel Trinidad, Jeffrey Santos, Patrick Dela Rosa, Levi Ignacio	Action	Star Cinema
Fidel Jimenez: Magkasubukan Tayo	Tata Esteban	Lito Lapid, Roy Alvarez, Ana Capri, Tonton Gutierrez, Jaime Fabregas, King Gutierrez	Action	Regal Films
Gigil	Mauro Gia Samonte	Nini Jacinto, Brigette de Joya, Leonardo Litton, Nonong De Andres, Maureen Mauricio	Erotic drama	Seiko Films
Gusto Ko Nang Lumigaya	Maryo J. delos Reyes	Pops Fernandez, Albert Martinez, Diether Ocampo	Drama, romance	Viva Films
Ika-13 Kapitulo	Michael de Mesa	Christopher de Leon, Anne Curtis, Zsazsa Padilla, Cherie Gil, Albert Martinez	Horror	Viva Films
Ipinanganak Na ang Taong Papatay sa 'Yo	Roland S. Ledesma	Ronald Gan Ledesma, Jimmy Santos, Beth Tamayo, Rey Ventura, Daria Ramirez, Joonee Gamboa, Jimmy Fabregas, Bob Soler, Rhey Roldan, Yam Ledesma	Action	Sunlight Films
Juan & Ted: Wanted	Al Tantay	Janno Gibbs, Bayani Agbayani	Comedy	Viva Films
Kailangan Ko'y Ikaw	Joyce Bernal	Robin Padilla, Regine Velasquez	Romantic comedy	VIVA Films
Kamandag ng Rosas	Angelito J. De Guzman	Marinella Moran, Jeffrey Gonzales, Erick Rodriguez, John Agoncillo, Hazel Espinosa, Yda Manzano, Erwin Montes, Aldo Alvarez	Erotic drama	ATB-4 Films
Kahit Isang Saglit	Gilbert Perez	Piolo Pascual, Judy Ann Santos, Leandro Muñoz	Drama	Star Cinema
Lagarista	Chito S. Roño	Piolo Pascual, Cherry Pie Picache, Jennifer Sevilla, Koko Trinidad, Pen Medina, Nonie Buencamino, Daria Ramirez, Janna Victoria	Drama, romance	Crown Seven Ventures
Laro sa Baga	Chito S. Roño	Ara Mina, Carlos Morales, Angel Aquino, Monique Wilson, Mark Gil, Cherry Pie Picache, Cholo Escaño, Malu Barry, Marita Zobel, Maila Gumila	Drama	Regal Entertainment
Madame X	Jose Carreon	Ina Raymundo, Gary Estrada, Pinky Amador, Alvin Anson, Robert Arevalo, Simon Ibarra, Izza Ignacio	Erotic drama	FLT Films
Mana Mana-Tiba Tiba	Al Tantay	Andrew E., Bayani Agbayani	Comedy	Viva Films
Mapagbigay	Emmanuel Borlaza	Nini Jacinto, Miya Nolasco, Rodel Velayo, Chanda Romero, Maureen Mauricio, Matthew Mendoza, Tom Olivar	Erotic drama	Seiko Films
Markova: Comfort Gay	Gil Portes	Dolphy, Eric Quizon, Jeffrey Quizon, Loren Legarda	Biography, drama, history	
Masarap Habang Mainit	William Pascual	Klaudia Koronel, Barbara Milano, Katrina Paula, Ina Alegre, Julio Diaz, Harold Pineda, Jethro Ramirez, Ailyn Valdez	Erotic comedy, romance	Starlight Films
Matalino Man ang Matsing Naiisahan Din!	Jun Aristorenas Jr.	Eddie Garcia, Willie Revillame, Patricia Javier, Joanne Quintas, Rez Cortez, Eddie Arenas, Jose Balagtas, Danny Labra	Comedy	Viva Films
Minsan Ko Lang Sasabihin	Danilo Cabreira	Ramon 'Bong' Revilla Jr., Judy Ann Santos, Edu Manzano, Carmina Villarroel, Dennis Padilla, Niño Muhlach, Bob Soler, Caridad Sanchez	Action, comedy	Millennium Cinema
Minsan, Minahal Kita	Olivia Lamasan	Sharon Cuneta, Richard Gutierrez, Edu Manzano, Carmina Villarroel	Drama, romance	Star Cinema
Most Wanted	Uro Q. Dela Cruz	Jomari Yllana, LJ Moreno, Eric Fructuoso, Hazel Espinosa, Carlos Morales, Wendell Ramos	Action	Regal Films
Palaban	Toto Natividad	Rudy Fernandez, Ara Mina	Action	
Pasasabugin Ko ang Mundo Mo	Baldo Marro	Lito Lapid, Klaudia Koronel, Alex Bolado	Action	Regal Films
Patigasan		Lito Lapid, Ana Capri, Tonton Gutierrez	Action	Regal Films
Pedro Penduko, Episode II: The Return of the Comeback	Erik Matti	Janno Gibbs, Ramon Zamora	Fantasy	Viva Films
Pedrong Palad	Nick Deocampo	Joonee Gamboa, Chin Chin Gutierrez, Jaclyn Jose, Julio Diaz, Hael Espinosa, Ramona Revilla, Leandro Baldemor	Adventure, fantasy	Good Harvest Productions
Pera o bayong (Not da TV)!	Edgar Mortiz	Willie Revillame, Randy Santiago, John Estrada, Paquito Diaz, Kristine Hermosa, Vanessa Del Bianco, Tracy Vergel, Mark Gil, Bayani Agbayani, Roderick Paulate, Bella Flores, Vangie Labalan	Comedy	Star Cinema
Perlas Sa Ilalim ng Dagat	Cesar S.B. Abella	Alma Soriano, Jeffrey Gonzales, Gino Antonio, Odette Khan	Erotic drama	El Niño Films
Ping Lacson: Super Cop	Toto Natividad	Rudy Fernandez, Lorna Tolentino, Ricky Davao, Glydel Mercado, Ace Espinosa, Trovador Ramos Jr., Levi Ignacio, Herbert Bautista	Action	Millennium Cinema
Sagot Kita: Mula Ulo Hanggang Paa	Felix Dalay	Jinggoy Estrada Vina Morales	Comedy	Viva Films
Samantha... Hiyas	N/A	Jasmine Tolentino, Fernando Montenegro, Venus Varga, Amalia Jones, Erwin Montes, Lyra Lorena, Eric Rodriguez	Erotic drama	Taurus Films
Saranggani	Edgardo Vinarao	Via Veloso, Anton Bernardo, Pyar Mirasol, Raffy Anido, Allen Dizon	Drama	World Arts Cinema
Senswal	Edgardo Vinarao	Piel Morena, Gary Estrada, Elizabeth Oropesa, Mike Magat, Tommy Abuel, Esther Chavez, Brando Legaspi, Venus Verga, Alma Soriano	Erotic drama	FLT Films International
Shame	Manny Castañeda	Ina Raymundo, John Apacible, Angela Velez, Pacqui Barrica, Carla Guevarra, Lui Manansala, Paula Gomez	Erotic drama	Available Light Productions, Regal Films
Spirit Warriors	Chito S. Roño	Vhong Navarro, Jhong Hilario	Horror	MAQ Productions
Sugatang Puso	Jose Javier Reyes	Christopher de Leon, Lorna Tolentino, Cherie Gil, Patrick Garcia, Carlo Aquino	Drama	Regal Films
Sugo ng Tondo	Jose Balagtas	Joko Diaz, Raymond Bagatsing, Patricia Javier, Boy Roque, Levi Ignacio	Action	Viva Films
Tanging Yaman	Laurice Guillen	Johnny Delgado, Gloria Romero, Edu Manzano	Drama	Star Cinema
Tunay na Tunay: Gets Mo? Gets Ko!	Joyce Bernal	Robin Padilla, Jolina Magdangal, Bearwin Meily, Vic Diaz, Efren Reyes Jr.	Action, comedy, romance	Star Cinema
Uhaw na Hayop	Rolly Bernardo	Hazel Espinosa, Jasmine Tolentino, Nicko Montes, Aldo Alvarez, Erwin Montes, Kristina Kasten, Lyra Lorena	Action, erotic drama	Taurus Films
Yakapin Mo ang Umaga	Joyce Bernal	Christopher de Leon, Lorna Tolentino, Nida Blanca, Gina Alajar	Drama	Regal Films

== 2001 ==
Title	Director	Cast	Genre	Studio
2001
Aagos ang Dugo	Mauro Gia Samonte	Gardo Versoza, Isabel Granada	Action sex film	Regal Films
Abakada... Ina	Eddie Garcia	Lorna Tolentino	Drama	Viva Films
Alas Dose	Augusto Salvador	Cesar Montano, Sunshine Cruz, Christopher de Leon, Patricia Javier, Dick Israel	Action	Viva Films
Bagong Buwan	Marilou Diaz-Abaya	Cesar Montano, Jericho Rosales, Carlo Aquino, Amy Austria, Jiro Manio, Jhong Hilario	Action, drama, war	Star Cinema
Bakit 'Di Totohanin	Boots Plata	Judy Ann Santos, Piolo Pascual	Comedy, drama, family	Star Cinema
Balahibong Pusa	Yam Laranas	Elizabeth Oropesa, Julio Diaz, Jay Manalo, Rica Peralejo, Joyce Jimenez	Crime, romance, thriller	
Bahay ni Lola	Uro Q. Dela Cruz	Aiza Seguerra, Manilyn Reynes, Gina Alajar	Horror	Regal Films
Banyo Queen	Al Tantay	Andrew E., Rica Peralejo	Comedy, horror	Viva Films
Basagan ng Mukha	Jose Balagtas	Ronald Gan Ledesma, Manny Pacquiao, Beth Tamayo	Action	MMG Entertainment Group
Booba	Joyce Bernal	Rufa Mae Quinto, Gary Estrada, Ai-Ai delas Alas	Comedy	Viva Films
Bukas, Babaha ng Dugo	Baldo Marro	Lito Lapid, Emilio Garcia, Efren Reyes, Jr.	Action	Regal Films
Cool Dudes 24/7	Ruel S. Bayani	James Blanco, Cogie Domingo, Danilo Barrios, Glaiza de Castro, Phoemela Baranda	Youth-oriented/romance	Regal Films
Dalawang Pisngi ng Langit	Cesar S.B. Abella	Nini Jacinto, Francis Enriquez, Alma Soriano, Mike Magat	Erotic drama	El Niño Films
Di Kita Ma-Reach	Wilfredo Milan	Mikey Arroyo, LJ Moreno, Eula Valdez, Tonton Gutierrez, Ana Capri, Raymond Bagatsing, King Gutierrez	Action, comedy, drama	ECorp Films
Di Mapigil ang Init	Angelito J. De Guzman	Hazel Espinosa, Marinella Moran, Jackie Diaz, Erwin Montes, Erick Rodriguez, Vic Santos	Erotic drama	Taurus Films
Dos Ekis	Erik Matti	Rica Peralejo, Mark Anthony Fernandez	Crime, romance, thriller	Viva Films
Dugong Aso: Mabuting Kaibigan, Masamang Kaaway	Lito Lapid	Mark Lapid, Kristine Hermosa, Ace Espinosa, Roi Vinzon	Action	Megabuilt Films International
Halik ng Sirena	Joven Tan	Isabel Granada, Carlos Morales, Gerald Madrid, Pinky Amador, Anita Linda, Richard Quan, Hazel Espinosa, Lilia Cuntapay	Romance, fantasy	Regal Films
Hiyas... Sa Paraiso ng Kasalanan	Rico Tariman	Via Veloso, Alma Soriano, Francis Enriquez, Katrina Paula, Harold Pineda, Charlie Davao, Daniel Fernando, Julio Diaz, Lito Legaspi, Lovely Rivero	Erotic drama	Leo Films
Hostage	Augusto Salvador	Cesar Montano, Bayani Agbayani, Roi Vinzon, Kristine Hermosa, Amy Austria, Daniel Fernando	Action	Star Cinema
Hubog (Wretched Lives)	Joel Lamangan	Jay Manalo, Wendell Ramos, Alessandra de Rossi, Assunta de Rossi, Tony Mabesa, Mel Kimura, Joanne Quintas	Crime, drama	Good Harvest Productions
Huwag Kang Kikibo	Gil Portes	Priscilla Almeda, Raymond Bagatsing, Via Veloso, Leandro Baldemor, Camille Roxas, Cheska Diaz	Erotic drama, thriller	Teamwork Productions
Ika-Pitong Gloria	Rico Tariman	Halina Perez, Leandro Baldemor, Ramon Christopher, Julio Diaz, Allen Dizon, Melissa Mendez, Katrina Paula	Erotic drama	Leo Films
Kaaway Hanggang Hukay	Joey Del Rosario	Phillip Salvador, Ina Raymundo, Edu Manzano	Action	RS Productions
Kangkong	Mauro Gio Samonte	Rodel Velayo, Brigitte de Joya, Jethro Ramirez, Sofia Valdez, Paula Gomez/ with Emmanuel Borlaza, Odette Khan	Erotic drama	Seiko Films
Kapag Buhay Ang Inutang... Buhay Din Ang Kabayaran	Manuel Cinco	Joko Diaz, Jun Aristorenas, Bob Soler, Vic Varrion	Action	Arthur Films International, EDL Productions
Kapirasong Gubat sa Gitna ng Dagat	Jose Balagtas	Alma Soriano, K.C. Castillo, Camille Roxas, JC Castro, Alvin Anson, Mike Magat	Erotic drama	Sunlight Films, LedCinema Inc.
La Vida Rosa	Chito S. Roño	Diether Ocampo, Rosanna Roces	Crime, drama, romance	Star Cinema
Live Show	Jose Javier Reyes	Klaudia Koronel, Hazel Espinosa, Ana Capri, Daria Ramirez, Marcus Madrigal, Simon Ibarra, Nika Valencia, Oliver Hartmann, Martin Gonzalo, Paolo Rivero	Erotic drama	Available Light Productions; Regal Entertainment
Mananabas	Cesar Montano	Cesar Montano, Spanky Manikan, Rommel Montano, Jeffrey Tam, Daniel Fernando	Action	Maverick Films
Mano Mano 2: Ubusan ng Lakas	Ronnie Ricketts	Ronnie Ricketts, Mariz, Rommel Montano, Dick Israel, Rez Cortez, Alvin Anson	Action	Maverick Films
Masakit... Huwag Mong Ipilit!	Angelito J. de Guzman	Rita Magdalena, Hazel Espinosa, Jeffrey Gonzales, Francis Enriquez, Razelle Angela	Erotic drama	ATB-4 Films
Mila	Joel Lamangan	Maricel Soriano, Piolo Pascual	Drama	Star Cinema
Narinig Mo Na Ba ang L8est?	Jose Javier Reyes	Aga Muhlach, Joyce Jimenez	Romance, comedy	Star Cinema
Ooops, Teka Lang... Diskarte ko 'to!	Jose N. Carreon	Robin Padilla, Claudine Barretto	Action, comedy, drama	Star Cinema, FLT Films International
Pagdating ng Panahon	Joyce Bernal	Sharon Cuneta, Robin Padilla, Amy Austria, Rufa Mae Quinto	Comedy, drama, romance	Viva Films
Pangako Ikaw Lang	Joyce Bernal	Regine Velasquez, Aga Muhlach	Drama, romance	Viva Films
Parehas ang Laban	William Mayo	Ian Veneracion, John Regala, Angela Velez	Action	Solar Films
Pukyntan	Cesar S.B. Abella	Nini Jacinto, Rita Magdalena, K.C. Castillo, Mike Magat	Erotic comedy, romance	El Niño Films
Radyo	Yam Laranas	Rufa Mae Quinto, Epi Quizon	Comedy, thriller	Viva Films
Red Diaries	Maryo J. de los Reyes	Assunta de Rossi, Chiqui Xerxes-Burgos, Anton Bernardo	Romantic drama	Regal Films
Sa Huling Paghihintay	Erik Matti	Rica Peralejo, Bernard Palanca, Mark Gil, Pinky Amador, Jong Hilario, Jackie Forster	Romance	Viva Films
Sanggano't Sanggago	Al Tantay	Eddie Garcia, Bayani Agbayani	Action	Viva Films, FLT Films International
Susmaryosep! Four Fathers	Edgardo Vinarao	Bobby Andrews, Bojo Molina, Polo Ravales, Gerard Madrid	Drama, comedy	Maverick Films
Syota ng Bayan	Romy Suzara	Priscilla Almeda, Eddie Garcia, Tonton Gutierrez, Camille Roxas, Ray Ventura	Erotic drama	Solar Film, Regal Films
Tabi Tabi Po	Jose Carreon (Vampira 2000), Tata Estaban (Engkantada), Joven Tan (Demonyita)		Horror	Viva Films
Tatarin	Tikoy Aguiluz	Dina Bonnevie, Edu Manzano, Rica Peralejo	Drama, romance	Viva Films
Tikim	Jose Javier Reyes	Rodel Velayo, Barbara Milano, Leonardo Litton, Marco Alejandro, Allan Paule, John Apacible, Mon Confiado, Maureen Mauricio	Erotic comedy, romance	Available Light Productions, Seiko Films
Tuhog (Larger Than Life)	Jeffrey Jeturian	Ina Raymundo, Klaudia Koronel, Jaclyn Jose, Irma Adlawan, Dante Rivero, Crispin Pineda	Erotic drama	Available Light Productions, Regal Films
Tusong Twosome	Ben Feleo	Janno Gibbs, Andrew E., Joanne Santos-Quintas, Jackie Forster, David Bunevacz, Victoria London	Comedy	Viva Films
Uhaw sa Init ng Pagmamahal	Cesar S. B. Abella	Allona Amor, Sharmaine Suarez, Fernando Montenegro, Shanghai	Erotic drama	El Niño Films
The Virgin Wife	Jose N. Carreon	Piel Morena, Tonton Gutierrez, Leandro Baldemor, Ace Espinosa, Julio Diaz, Jeffrey Santos, Jean Saburit, Joonee Gamboa, Pamela Ortiz, Izza Ignacio	Erotic drama	Viva Films
Vital Parts	Craig Corman	Richard Grieco, Joyce Jimenez, Will Stewart, Athena Massey, Teresa Loyzaga, Jaime Fabregas, Bob Soler, Nonie Buencamino	Action	Viva Films
Yamashita: The Tiger's Treasure	Chito S. Roño	Armando Goyena, Carlo Muñoz	Action, drama, war	Regal Films, MAQ Films

== 2002 ==
Title	Director	Cast	Genre	Studio
2002
9 Mornings	Jose Javier Reyes	Piolo Pascual, Donita Rose	Romance	Star Cinema
Agimat: Ang Anting-Anting ni Lolo	Augusto Salvador	Ramon "Bong" Revilla Jr., Ramon Revilla Sr., Ramon "Jolo" Revilla III, Mylene Dizon, Carlos Morales	Fantasy action	Imus Productions
Alyas Bomba Queen	Joven Tan	Halina Perez, Pyar Mirasol, Harold Pineda, Criselda Volks, Marcus Madrigal, Maria Isabel Lopez, Sarsi Emmanuelle, Nonie Buencamino	Erotic drama	Starlight Films
Ang Alamat ng Lawin	Ronwaldo Reyes	Fernando Poe Jr., Ina Raymundo, Cathy Villar, Ryan Yamazaki, Franklin Cristobal, Khen Kurillo, Romy Diaz, Alex Cunanan	Action, fantasy, adventure	FPJ Productions
American Adobo	Laurice Guillen	Cherry Pie Picache, Dina Bonnevie, Ricky Davao	Comedy, romance	Star Cinema
Bahid	Joel Lamangan	Eddie Garcia, Dina Bonnevie	Drama	Jagss Entertainment
Bakat	Francis Posadas	Diana Zubiri, Rodel Velayo, Rita Avila, Ana Capri, Daria Ramirez, Tommy Abuel, Edwin Reyes, Mon Confiado	Erotic drama	Seiko Films
Batas ng Lansangan	Ronwaldo Reyes	Fernando Poe Jr., Dina Bonnevie, Kaye Abad, Charlie Davao, Roi Vinzon, Dick Israel	Action, crime, drama	Viva Films
Bibingka... Apoy sa Ilalim, Apoy sa Ibabaw	Cesar SB Abella	Via Veloso, K. C. Castillo, Francis Enriquez, Ernie Forte, Angelica Reyes, Shanghai, Ten-Ten, Ethel Villaviray	Erotic drama	El Nino Films
Biglang Liko	Joven Tan	Halina Perez, Barbara Milano, Simon Ibarra, Stella L., Harold Pineda, Richard Quan, Anita Linda	Erotic drama	Starlight Films
Bukang Bibig	Cesar SB Abella	Aya Medel, Yda Manzano, Francis Enriquez, Jeffrey Gonzales, Sydney Segovia, Renz de Vera	Erotic drama	El Nino Films
Buko Pandan	Uro Q. de la Cruz	Maricar de Mesa, Pyar Mirasol, Tonton Gutierrez, Paolo Rivero	Erotic drama	World Arts Cinema
Dekada '70	Chito S. Roño	Vilma Santos, Christopher de Leon, Piolo Pascual	Drama	Star Cinema
Diskarte	Edgardo Vinarao	Rudy Fernandez, Ara Mina	Action, drama	Maverick Films
D' Uragons	Ben Feleo	Andrew E., Eddie Garcia	Action, comedy	Viva Films
Biglang Liko	Joven Tan	Halina Perez, Barbara Milano, Simon Ibarra, Stella L., Harold Pineda, Richard Quan, Anita Linda	Erotic drama	Starlight Films
Eskandalosa	Joven Tan	Barbara Milano, Elizabeth Oropesa, Ricky Belmonte, Melanie Marquez, John Apacible, Richard Quan, Paulo Rivero, Francis Enriquez, Ruby Padilla, Aldo Rivero	Erotic drama	FLT Films
Forevermore	John-D Lazatin	Kristine Hermosa, Jericho Rosales	Drama, romance	Star Cinema
Gamitan	Quark Henares	Maui Taylor, Wendell Ramos, Jordan Herrera	Action, drama	Viva Films
Got 2 Believe	Olivia Lamasan	Rico Yan, Claudine Barretto, Vhong Navarro, Nikki Valdez, Dominic Ochoa	Romantic-Comedy	Star Cinema
Halik sa Lupa	Jett C. Espiritu	Allona Amor, Jeffrey Santos, Venus Varga, Raffy Anido, Zoltan Amore	Erotic drama	ATB-4 Films
Hari Ng Selda: Anak Ni Baby Ama 2	Deo Fajardo Jr.	Robin Padilla, Angelika Dela Cruz, Johnny Delgado, Roldan Aquino, Rommel Padilla, Dick Israel, Daria Ramirez, Raven Villanueva, Berting Labra, Flora Gasser, Mon Confiado, Dexter Doria, Evangeline Pascual, Jeffrey Tam, June Hidalgo, July Hidalgo, Boy Roque, Joey Padilla	Action	Viva Films
Hinog sa Pilit, Sobra sa Tamis	Rico Tariman	Halina Perez, Allen Dizon, Paolo Rivero, Monia Perez	Erotic drama	Leo Films
Hula Mo... Huli Ko	Edgar Vinarao	Rudy Fernandez and Rufa Mae Quinto	Comedy	Reflection Films
Home Along da Riber	Eric Quizon	Dolphy, Jolina Magdangal, Zsa Zsa Padilla, Vandolph, Eddie Gutierrez, Long Mejia, James Blanco, Boy2 Quizon, Michelle Quizon, Palito	Comedy	RVQ Productions
Hustler	Joel Apuyan	Jacky Woo, Jo Canonizado, John Apacible, Via Veloso, Ricardo Cepeda	Action, Sport	Solar Films; Filipino-Japanese co-production
I Think I'm in Love	Maryo J. de los Reyes	Joyce Jimenez, Piolo Pascual	Romance, drama, comedy	Regal Films
Itlog	Francis Posadas	Diana Zubiri, Rodel Velayo, Celso Ad. Castillo, Allona Amor, Winston Elizalde	Erotic drama, romance	Seiko Films
Jeannie, Bakit Ngayon Ka Lang?	Ike Jarlego Jr.	Robin Padilla, Judy Ann Santos, King Alcala	Drama	Viva Films
Jologs	Gilbert G. Perez	Diether Ocampo, Patrick Garcia, Vhong Navarro, Onemig Bondoc, Dominic Ochoa, Assunta De Rossi, John Prats, Jodi Sta. Maria, Julia Clarete, Baron Geisler, Michelle Bayle	Comedy, drama, romance	Star Cinema
Kailangan Kita	Rory Quintos	Claudine Barretto, Aga Muhlach	Drama, romance	Star Cinema
Kasiping	Augusto Salvador	Diana Zubiri, Halina Perez, Rodel Velayo, Giselle Sanchez, Dante Balboa, Long Mejia	Comedy, erotic drama, romance	Seiko Films
Kaulayaw	Jett C. Espiritu	Barbara Milano, Julio Diaz, Allen Dizon, Roy Alvarez, Jeffrey Santos, Allan Paule, Lovely Rivero, Aleck Bovick, Alberto de Esteban, Lynn Madrigal	Erotic drama	Tri-Vision Films
Kung Ikaw Ay Isang Panaginip	Wenn V. Deramas	Jolina Magdangal	Drama, family, fantasy	Star Cinema
Laman	Maryo J. de los Reyes	Albert Martinez, Elizabeth Oropesa	Thriller, drama	Regal Films
Lapu-Lapu	William G. Mayo	Lito Lapid, Dante Rivero	Action, biography, history	Calinuan Cine Works, EDL Productions
Ligaya... Pantasya ng Bayan	Armando A. Reyes	Halina Perez, John Apacible, Alma Soriano, Leandro Baldemor, Harold Pineda, Lito Legaspi, Odette Khan	Erotic drama	Leo Films
Mahal Kita: Final Answer!	Joyce Bernal	Bong Revilla, Rufa Mae Quinto, Bobby Andrews, Patricia Javier, Anne Curtis, John Lapus	Comedy, family, romance	Viva Films
Mano Po	Joel Lamangan	Ara Mina, Kris Aquino, Maricel Soriano	Drama	Regal Films
Magkapatid	Joel Lamangan	Sharon Cuneta, Judy Ann Santos	Drama	Viva Films
Masarap na Pugad	Francis Posadas	Aleck Bovick, Gary Estrada, Joko Diaz, Alma Soriano, Rita Magdalena, Elizabeth Oropesa, Maria Isabel Lopez	Erotic drama, romance	Angora Films
Masarap ba ang Bawal?	Roland Ledesma	Pyar Mrasol, Mike Magat, Camille Roxas, JC Castro, Bob Soler	Erotic drama	Sunlight Films, Led Cinema, Allianze Movie Venture
Mga Batang Lansangan Ngayon	Jose N. Carreon	Joko Diaz, Bobby Andrews, Sunshine Cruz, Shaina Magdayao	Drama	
Mga Munting Tinig	Gil Portes	Alessandra de Rossi	Drama	CAP Philippines, Teamwork Productions, Warner Bros. Pictures
Pistolero	William G. Mayo	Jeric Raval, John Apacible, Joanne Miller	Action, horror	Regal Films
Prosti	Erik Matti	Aubrey Miles, Jay Manalo, Raquel Villavicencio, Pinky Amador, Hazel Espinosa, Paulo Rivero	Erotic drama	Regal Films
Sabayan sa Laban	Eugene Asis	Carlos Morales, Paquito Diaz, Jeffrey Santos, Jethro Ramirez, Stella L., Joanna Gonzales	Action	Regal Entertainment
Sana Totoo Na	Armand Reyes	Glydel Mercado, Tonton Gutierrez, Rita Magdalena, John Arcilla, Allen Dizon, Pyar Mirasol, Minnie Aguilar, Joseph Baltazar, Jackie Castillejos, Kirby de Jesus	Erotic drama	World Arts Cinema
Sex Files	Joven Tan	Barbara Milano, Pyar Mirasol, Pinky Amador, Halina Perez, John Apacible, Ana Capri, Maria Isabel Lopez, Richard Quan, Paolo Rivero	Erotic drama	Good Harvest
Singsing Ni Lola	Uro Q. dela Cruz	Gina Alajar, Joel Torre, Aiza Seguerra	Horror	Regal Films
Spirit Warriors: The Shortcut	Chito S. Roño	Vhong Navarro, Jhong Hilario, Danilo Barrios, Spencer Reyes, Christopher Cruz, Jaime Fabregas, Gloria Romero	Horror-fantasy/adventure	MAQ Productions, Roadrunner Network
S2pid Luv	Al Tantay	Andrew E., Blakdyak, Angelika Dela Cruz, Maui Taylor	Comedy, music, romance	Viva Films
Super B	Joyce Bernal	Rufa Mae Quinto, Marvin Agustin, Melanie Marquez, Mylene Dizon, Dick Israel	Fantasy	Neo Films
Tampisaw	Francis Posadas	Aleck Bovick, Aimee Torres	Drama, romance	Tri-Vision Films
Tukaan	Armando A. Reyes	Halina Perez, Ace Aenlle Cruz, Allen Dizon, Lito Legaspi, Berting Labra, Odette Khan, Katrina Paula	Erotic drama	Leo Films
Videoke King	Jerry Lopez Sineneng	Robin Padilla, Pops Fernandez, Victor Neri	Action, comedy, drama	Star Cinema
Virgin People III	Celso Ad. Castillo	Barbara Milano, Allona Amor, Monina Perez	Drama	Four Aces Films
Walang Iwanan... Peksman	Toto Natividad	Jinggoy Estrada, Judy Ann Santos, Bayani Agbayani, Ace Espinosa, Pyar Mirasol, Robert Arevalo	Comedy, romance, action	Jolo Films

== 2003 ==
Title	Director	Cast	Genre	Studio
2003
A.B. Normal College (Todo na 'Yan! Kulang Pa 'Yun!)	Al Tantay	Rufa Mae Quinto, Andrew E., Ogie Alcasid, Mikey Arroyo	Comedy	Viva Films
Ang Huling Birhen sa Lupa	Joel Lamangan	Jay Manalo, Ara Mina, Maui Taylor	Drama	JAGGS Productions and Viva Films
Ang Tanging Ina	Wenn V. Deramas	Ai-Ai delas Alas	Comedy	Star Cinema
Babae sa Breakwater	Mario O'Hara	Katherine Luna	Drama	Entertainment Warehouse
Bayaran	Francis Posadas	Jay Manalo, Maricar de Mesa	Action, drama	Wild World Entertainment, Inc.
Bugbog Sarado	Joel Lamangan	Maui Taylor, Victor Neri, Andrea Del Rosario	Drama, mystery, thriller	Viva Films
Captain Barbell	Mac Alejandre	Bong Revilla, Regine Velasquez, Ogie Alcasid, Ruffa Mae Quinto	Adventure, comedy, fantasy	Premiere Entertainment Productions
Chavit	Carlo J. Caparas	Cesar Montano, Tirso Cruz III, Eddie Garcia, Pinky de Leon, Willie Nepomuceno	Action, biography	Golden Lion Films, Starmax International and Velcor Films
The Cory Quirino Kidnap: The NBI Files	Carlo J. Caparas	Alessandra de Rossi	Action, crime, drama	Cinemega, Inc. and Golden Lion Films
Crying Ladies	Mark Meily	Sharon Cuneta, Angel Aquino, Hilda Koronel, Eric Quizon	Comedy, drama	Unitel Pictures
Dayo	Ronnie Ricketts (credited as: Ronn-Rick)	Ronnie Ricketts, Regine Tolentino, Angelica Panganiban, Long Mejia, Ruel Vernal, Manjo Del Mundo, Gene Padilla, Mandy Ochoa	Action	Maverick Films
Duda/Doubt	Crisaldo Pablo	Andoy Ranay, Pablo Gabriel	Drama	
Fantastic Man	Tony Y. Reyes	Vic Sotto, Ara Mina, Michael V., Zoren Legaspi, Leo Martinez	Adventure, action, comedy	Octoarts Films
Filipinas	Joel Lamangan	Richard Gomez, Maricel Soriano	Drama	Viva Films
Homecoming	Gil Portes	Elizabeth Oropesa, Alessandra de Rossi	Drama	Cinema Partners, Frontera Media Productions, Kidlat Entertainment and Teamwork Productions
Keka	Quark Henares	Katya Santos, Vhong Navarro, Wendell Ramos	Action, comedy, romance	
Kung Ako Na Lang Sana	Jose Javier Reyes	Sharon Cuneta, Aga Muhlach	Romance, comedy	Star Cinema
Lastikman	Tony Y. Reyes	Vic Sotto, Donita Rose, Jeffrey Quizon, Michael V., Michelle Bayle, Ryan Eigenmann, Anne Curtis, Oyo Boy Sotto	Fantasy	Octoarts Films
Magnifico	Maryo J. de los Reyes	Jiro Manio, Lorna Tolentino, Mark Gil	Drama	Violet Films
Malikmata	Jose Javier Reyes	Kristel Fulgar, Marvin Agustin, Rica Peralejo	Horror	Canary Films
Mano Po 2: My Home	Erik Matti	Susan Roces, Christopher de Leon, Lorna Tolentino, Zsa Zsa Padilla, Kris Aquino, Judy Ann Santos, Carmina Villarroel, Jay Manalo, Cogie Domingo, Richard Gutierrez, Zoren Legaspi, Alessandra de Rossi, Karylle, Chynna Ortaleza, Angel Locsin	Drama	Regal Films
Masamang Ugat	Willy Milan	Ace Vergel, Eddie Garcia, Victor Neri, Mikey Arroyo, Maui Taylor, Eddie Arenas, Al Tantay, Gwen Garci, Susan Africa, Emilio Garcia, Efren Reyes Jr.	Action, Drama	Viva Films
Matamis Hanggang Dulo	Cesar Abella	Maye Tongco, Laila Berretto, Monica Blanca	Drama	El Niño Films
Minsan, Minahal Kita	Olivia Lamasan	Sharon Cuneta, Richard Gomez	Romance	
Mr. Suave	Joyce E. Bernal	Vhong Navarro	Comedy	Star Cinema
My First Romance	John D. Lazatin, Don Cuaresma	John Lloyd Cruz, Bea Alonzo, Heart Evangelista, John Prats	Romance	Star Cinema
Ngayong Nandito Ka	Jerry Lopez Sineneng	Jericho Rosales, Kristine Hermosa	Drama, romance	Star Cinema
Noon at Ngayon: Pagsasamang Kay Ganda	Marilou Diaz-Abaya	Paolo Contis, Aiza Marquez	Comedy, drama	Star Cinema
Onse	William G. Mayo	Jeric Raval	Action	
Operation Balikatan	Cirio H. Santiago	Christian Boeving, Stacy Keach, Eddie Garcia, Rey Malonzo, Monsour del Rosario	Action	Premiere Entertainment Productions
Pakners	Tony Y. Reyes	Fernando Poe, Jr., Efren Reyes, January Isaac, Oyo Boy Sotto, Toni Gonzaga, Candy Pangilinan, Romy Diaz, Dick Israel, Pocholo Montes, Gerard Ejercito, Tiya Pusit, Ai-Ai Delas Alas, Johnny Delgado	Sports, Comedy	FPJ Productions
Pinay Pie	Jose Javier Reyes	Assunta de Rossi, Ai-Ai delas Alas	Comedy	Star Cinema
Sex Scandal	Francis "Jun" Posadas	Allen Dizon, Isabella Gomez, Danna Garcel, Nika Madrid, Gerald Lauron	Drama	Sacramento Films
Sanib	Celso Ad. Castillo	Aubrey Miles, Joel Torre, Gina Alajar, Raymond Bagatsing, Carlo Muñoz, Orestes Ojeda, Ana Capri	Horror	MAQ Productions
Sukdulan	Mac C. Alejandre	Katya Santos, Raymond Bagatsing, Carlo Maceda	Erotic drama	Viva Films
Till There Was You	Joyce E. Bernal	Piolo Pascual, Judy Ann Santos	Romance	Star Cinema
Xerex	Mel Chionglo	Aubrey Miles	Drama	
You and Me Against the World	Jose N. Carreon	Robin Padilla, Kris Aquino, Elizabeth Burton	Action, drama, romance	FLT Films International

== 2004 ==
Title	Director	Cast	Genre	Studio
2004
Aishite Imasu 1941: Mahal Kita	Joel Lamangan	Judy Ann Santos, Dennis Trillo	Drama	Regal Films
All My Life	Laurenti Dyogi	Aga Muhlach, Kristine Hermosa	Drama, romance	Star Cinema
Anak Ka ng Tatay Mo	Ed Palmos	Albert Martinez, Snooky Serna	Drama	Viva Films
Animal	Toto Natividad	John Regala, Gardo Versoza, Via Veloso, Pyar Mirasol, Brando Legaspi, Caridad Sanchez	Action, crime	World Arts Cinema
Astigmatism	Jon Red	Robin Padilla, Alessandra De Rossi	Action, drama	Viva Films
Bcuz of U	John-D Lazatin; Mae Cruz-Alviar; Cathy Garcia-Molina	Kristine Hermosa, Diether Ocampo, Heart Evangelista, Geoff Eigenman, Sandara Park, Hero Angeles	Romantic comedy	Star Cinema
Beautiful Life	Gil Portes	Ricky Davao, Michelle Bayle, Maxene Magalona, Gloria Romero	Drama	Regal Films
Bridal Shower	Jeffrey Jeturian	Dina Bonnevie, Francine Prieto, Cherry Pie Picache	Drama, comedy, romance	Seiko Films
Enteng Kabisote: OK Ka Fairy Ko... The Legend	Tony Y. Reyes	Vic Sotto	Comedy	Octo Arts Films and M-Zet Productions
Feng Shui	Chito S. Roño	Kris Aquino	Horror	Star Cinema
Gagamboy	Erik Matti	Vhong Navarro	Comedy, fantasy	Star Cinema
Karelasyon	Neal 'Buboy' Tan	Kuhdet Honasan, Paolo Rivero, Isabella Gomez, Karina Zobel, Dante Balboa	Drama	ATB-4 Films
Kulimlim	Maryo J. de los Reyes	Robin Padilla	Horror	Viva Films
Lastikman: Unang Banat	Mac Alejandre	Mark Bautista, Sarah Geronimo, John Estrada, Danilo Barrios, Elizabeth Oropesa, Joel Torre, Mark Gil, Bearwin Meily, Tuesday Vargas, Mikel Campos and Cherie Gil	Fantasy	VIVA Films
Mano Po III: My Love	Joel Lamangan	Vilma Santos, Christopher De Leon, Eddie Garcia	Drama	Regal Films
Masikip sa Dibdib	Joyce Bernal	Rufa Mae Quinto, Antonio Aquitania, Gina Pareño, John Lapus, Sunshine Dizon	Comedy	Viva Films and Media Asia
Milan	Olivia Lamasan	Piolo Pascual, Claudine Barretto	Drama, romance	Star Cinema
Minsan Pa	Jeffrey Jeturian	Jomari Yllana, Ara Mina, Christian Vasquez	Romance	
Naglalayag	Maryo J. de los Reyes	Nora Aunor, Yul Servo	Drama	Angora Films
Now That I Have You	Laurenti Dyogi	John Lloyd Cruz, Bea Alonzo	Romance	Star Cinema
Otso-Otso Pamela-Mela-Wan	Jerry Lopez Sineneng	Bayani Agbayani, Vhong Navarro	Comedy	Star Cinema
Pa-siyam	Erik Matti	Roderick Paulate, Cherry Pie Picache, Aubrey Miles, Yul Servo	Horror, drama, mystery	
Panaghoy sa Suba	Cesar Montano	Cesar Montano, Juliana Palermo	Romance, drama, war	CM Productions
Sabel	Joel Lamangan	Wendell Ramos, Iza Calzado, Sunshine Dizon, Judy Ann Santos	Drama	Regal Films
Santa Santita	Laurice Guillen	Angelica Panganiban, Jericho Rosales	Drama	Unitel Pictures
Sigaw	Yam Laranas	Richard Gutierrez, Angel Locsin, James Blanco, Jomari Yllana, Iza Calzado	Horror, thriller	Viva Films
So Happy Together	Joel Lamangan	Kris Aquino, Eric Quizon	Comedy	Regal Films
Spirit of the Glass	Jose Javier Reyes	Marvin Agustin, Rica Peralejo, Alessandra de Rossi, Dingdong Dantes	Fantasy, horror, romance	Canary Films
Volta	Wenn V. Deramas	Ai-Ai de las Alas	Fantasy, comedy	Star Cinema

== 2005 ==
Title	Director	Cast	Genre	Studio
2005
Agos	Cesar SB. Abella	Kat de Santos, Via Veloso, Shanghai, Rizza Rossini, Clark Concepcion	Erotic drama	El Niño Films, Vincent Films
Anak ng Tinapa	Jon Red	Ryan Eigenmann, China Cojuangco, Atong Redillas, Soliman Cruz, Ping Medina	Drama	Creative Programs
Ang Anak ni Brocka	Sigfreid Barros-Sanchez	Nonie Buencamino, Roence Santos, Shamaine Centenera-Buencamino, Soliman Cruz, Raul Morit	Comedy	Creative Programs
Bahay ni Lola 2	Joven Tan	Cherry Pie Picache, Dingdong Dantes, Karylle	Horror	Regal Films
Birhen ng Manaoag	Ben "M7" Yalung	Albert Martinez, Cherry Pie Picache, Eddie Garcia, Joyce Jimenez	Drama	Cine Suerte
Boso	Jon Red	Jeffrey Quizon, Katya Santos, Gwen Garci, Allen Dizon, Bembol Roco	Erotic drama	Digital Viva
Can This Be Love	Jose Javier Reyes	Hero Angeles, Sandara Park	Romance	Star Cinema
Cavite	Neill Dela Llana, Ian Gamazon	Ian Gamazon	Thriller	
D' Anothers	Bb. Joyce Bernal	Vhong Navarro	Comedy	Star Cinema
Dreamboy	Gilbert G. Perez	Piolo Pascual, Bea Alonzo		Star Cinema
Dubai	Rory Quintos	Aga Muhlach, Claudine Barretto, John Lloyd Cruz	Drama	Star Cinema
Enteng Kabisote 2: Okay Ka Fairy Ko... The Legend Continues!	Tony Y. Reyes	Vic Sotto, Kristine Hermosa	Comedy, family, fantasy	M-Zet Productions and Octo Arts Films
Enterpool: S.C.I.A., Senior Citizen in Action	Perry de Guzman, Noli Villar	Palito, Mykell Chan, Gretchen Malalad, Tony Ferrer, Paquito Diaz	Action comedy	Starboard Films
Exodus: Tales from the Enchanted Kingdom	Erik Matti	Ramon Revilla Jr., Iya Villania, Aubrey Miles	Action, fantasy	Enchanted Kingdom Prod., Ignite Media, Imus Productions and Reality Entertainment
Gracia	Cesar SB. Abella	Kat de Santos, Raja Montero, Via Veloso, Paolo Rivero, Shanghai	Erotic drama	El Niño Films, Vincent Films
Happily Ever After	Maryo J. delos Reyes	Keempee de Leon, Rainier Castillo, Yasmien Kurdi, John Prats, Tyron Perez, Maxene Magalona	Romantic anthology	Regal Entertainment, MAQ Productions
Hari ng Sablay	Mac Alejandre	Bearwin Meily, Joel Torre	Comedy	Regal Films
Kutob	Jose Javier Reyes	Marvin Agustin, Rica Peralejo, Alessandra de Rossi	Horror	Canary Films
La Visa Loca	Mark Meily	Robin Padilla, Johnny Delgado	Comedy	Unitel Pictures
Lamat	Cesar SB. Abella	Kat de Santos, Shanghai, Muke Perez, Clark Concepcion, Yani Garcia	Erotic drama	El Niño Films
Let the Love Begin	Mac Alejandre	Angel Locsin, Richard Gutierrez, Jennylyn Mercado, Mark Herras	Romance	
Lisensyadong Kamao	Tony Bernal	Manny Pacquiao, Eddie Garcia, Aubrey Miles	Action	Violet Films Production
Lovestruck	Louie Ignacio	Jennylyn Mercado, Mark Herras	Romance	GMA Films
Mano Po 4: Ako Legal Wife	Joel Lamangan	Rufa Mae Quinto, Cherry Pie Picache, Jay Manalo, Zsa Zsa Padilla, John Prats, JC de Vera, Bianca King	Drama	Regal Films
Masahista	Brillante Mendoza	Coco Martin, Jacklyn Jose, Allan Paule, Katherine Luna	Drama	Centerstage Productions and Gee Films International
Matthew, Mark, Luke and John	Gil Portes	Richard Quan, Paolo Serrano	Drama	
Mga Kalapati sa Gabi	Cesar SB. Abella	Raja Montero, Nika Madrid, Angela Ortiz, Maye Tongco, Kat de Santos	Erotic drama	El Niño Films, Vincent Films
Mga Pusang Gala	Ellen Ongkeko	Ricky Davao, Irma Adlawan	Comedy, drama, fantasy	Erasto Productions
Mulawin: The Movie	Dominic Zapata, Mark Reyes	Angel Locsin, Richard Gutierrez, Dennis Trillo	Action, adventure, fantasy	GMA Films and Regal Films
Nasaan Ka Man	Cholo Laurel	Jericho Rosales, Claudine Barretto, Diether Ocampo	Drama, romance, thriller	Star Cinema
Night Job	Neal "Buboy" Tan	Romano Vasquez, Joey Galvez, Jet Alcantara, Kuhdet Honasan, Inah Alegre	Erotic drama	Taurus Films
Okey Ka, Pare Ko: Soon to Be a Legend	Cesar SB. Abella	Pekto, Raja Montero, Oddie Beatriz, Julia Taylor	Fantasy comedy	El Niño Films
Ang Pagdadalaga ni Maximo Oliveros	Auraeus Solito	Nathan Lopez, Soliman Cruz, JR Valentin, Ping Medina	Drama	UFO Pictures
Paraiso	Toto Natividad	Renee Summer, John Regala, Kier Legaspi, Roldan Aquino, Dido dela Paz	Erotic drama	World Arts Cinema
Pasaway Na Multo	Cesar SB. Abella	Bonel Balingit, Raja Montero, Shanghai, Alyssa Moore, Ten-ten	Comedy	El Niño Films, Vincent Films
Sa Pagitan ng Langit	Cesar SB. Abella	Nikka Madrid, Raja Montero, Clark Concepcion, Shanghai	Erotic drama	LUV Films
Saksi Driver	Cesar SB. Abella	Bonel Balingit, Maye Tongco, Raja Montero, Nikka Madrid, Yani Garcia	Comedy	El Niño Films
Shake, Rattle & Roll 2k5	Uro Dela Cruz, Richard Somes, Rico Maria Ilarde	*Episode 1: "Poso" - Ai-Ai delas Alas, Gloria Romero, Yasmien Kurdi, Rainier Castillo, Marco Alcaraz; *Episode 2: "Aquarium" - Ara Mina, Ogie Alcasid, Faisal Daquigan, Wilma Doesnt; *Episode 3: "Ang Lihim ng San Joaquin" - Mark Anthony Fernandez, Tanya Garcia, Elizabeth Oropesa, Nonie Buencamino, Ronnie Lazaro	Horror comedy anthology	Regal Films
Tag-ulan Noon: Ang Bukid Ay Basa 2	Cesar SB. Abella	Nikka Madrid, Paolo Rivero, Yani Garcia	Erotic drama	LUV Films
Tagos sa Laman	Cesar SB. Abella	Kat de Santos, Via Veloso, Paolo Rivero	Erotic drama	El Niño Films, Vincent Films
Terrorist Hunter	Val Iglesias	Eddie Garcia, Derek Dee, Dennis Roldan, Maricar de Mesa	Action	Double Impact Films, Leo Films and MMG Entertainment International
Uno	Ronnie Ricketts	Ronnie Ricketts, Monsour del Rosario, Danica Sotto, Cheska Garcia, Dinky Doo, Erica Fuente, Boy Roque, T.J. Trinidad, Ricardo Cepeda	Action	Rockets Productions
'Wag Dyan, 'Wag Dyan! May Kiliti Ako Dyan!	Armando A. Reyes	Kat de Santos, John Lapus, Ian Valdez, Emilio Garcia, Tita Swarding	Comedy	Waterplus Productions

== 2006 ==
Title	Director	Cast	Genre	Studio
2006
All About Love	Jerry Lopez Sineneng, Don Cuaresma, Bb. Joyce Bernal	John Lloyd Cruz, Bea Alonzo, Anne Curtis, Luis Manzano, Angelica Panganiban, Jason Abalos	Drama	Star Cinema
Apoy sa Dibdib ng Samar	Jose 'Kaka' Balagtas	Mark Lapid, Cristine Reyes, Roi Vinzon, Elizabeth Oropesa, Dick Israel, Jess Lapid Jr., King Gutierrez, Amay Bisaya, Maynard Lapid, Roberto Gonzales	Action	North East Films
Barang	Neal Tan	Jacklyn Jose, Liza Lorena, Mike Tan, Cristine Reyes, Ma. Isabel Lopez, Jay Manalo, Juliana Palermo, Christian Luis, Jimi Concepcion, Terence Baylon	Horror	Northern Star Production
Barcelona	Gil Portes	Alessandra de Rossi	Drama	
Baryoke	Ron Bryant	Pen Medina, Elizabeth Oropeza, Ronnie Lazaro	Drama	
Batas Militar	Jess Lapid Jr.	Mark Lapid, Mark Anthony Fernandez, Tanya Garcia, Maynard Lapid, Roi Vinzon, Jess Lapid Jr., Dick Israel, Ricardo Cepeda, Liz Alindogan	Action	MTL Films
Binibining K	Joven Tan	Keanna Reeves, Troy Montero	Comedy	
Blue Moon	Joel Lamangan	Boots Anson-Roa, Christopher de Leon, Eddie Garcia, Dennis Trillo, Jennylyn Mercado, Mark Herras	Romance	Regal Films
Close to You	Cathy Garcia-Molina	John Lloyd Cruz, Bea Alonzo, Sam Milby	Romance	Star Cinema
Don't Give Up on Us	Joyce Bernal	Piolo Pascual, Judy Ann Santos	Romance	Star Cinema
D' Lucky Ones	Wenn V. Deramas	Pokwang, Eugene Domingo, Joseph Bitangcol, Sandara Park	Comedy	Star Cinema
Enteng Kabisote 3: Okay Ka, Fairy Ko: The Legend Goes On and On and On	Tony Y. Reyes	Vic Sotto	Comedy	OctoArts Films; M-Zet Productions
Eternity	Mark A. Reyes	Iza Calzado, Dingdong Dantes, Jennylyn Mercado, Mark Herras	Romance	Regal Films
First Day High	Mario Cornejo	Kim Chiu, Gerald Anderson, Maja Salvador, Jason Abalos, Geoff Eigenmann	Comedy, mystery	Star Cinema
Heremias	Lav Diaz	Ronnie Lazaro	Crime, drama	
Kasal, Kasali, Kasalo	Jose Javier Reyes	Judy Ann Santos, Ryan Agoncillo	Comedy, romance	Star Cinema
I Wanna Be Happy	Jose Javier Reyes	Cherry Pie Picache, Eddie Garcia, Terence Baylon, Gloria Romero	Comedy	Star Cinema
I Will Always Love You	Marc Alejandre	Richard Gutierrez, Angel Locsin	Romantic drama	Regal Films & GMA Films
Jupit	Alvin Reyes Fortuno	Ate Gay, Tim Espinosa	Comedy	Regal Entertainment
Kapag Tumibok ang Puso	Wenn V. Deramas	Ai-Ai de las Alas, Ramon Revilla Jr., Precious Lara Quigaman	Comedy	
Kasal, Kasali, Kasalo	Jose Javier Reyes	Judy Ann Santos, Ryan Agoncillo, Gloria Diaz, Gina Pareño	Romantic comedy	Star Cinema
Manay Po	Joel Lamangan	Cherry Pie Picache, John Prats, Polo Ravales, Jiro Manio	Comedy	Regal Films
Mano Po 5: Gua Ai Di	Joel Lamangan	Richard Gutierrez, Angel Locsin, Lorna Tolentino, Gina Alajar, Kamilah Daquigan, Boots Anson-Roa, Christian Bautista	Drama	Regal Films
Matakot Ka sa Karma	Jose Javier Reyes	Rica Peralejo, Angelica Panganiban, Gretchen Barretto, Tanya Garcia, Bianca King, Ana Capri	Horror	Canary Films and OctoArts Films
Mga Batang Bangketa	Angelito J. de Guzman	Camille Prats, Marco Alcaraz	Drama	Rosas Entertainment Films
Moments of Love	Mark A. Reyes	Dingdong Dantes, Iza Calzado, Paolo Contis, Karylle	Romance	GMA Films
Mourning Girls	Gil Portes	Assunta de Rossi, Cogie Domingo, Glydel Mercado	Comedy	
Oh My Ghost!	Tony Y. Reyes	Rufa Mae Quinto, Marvin Agustin	Comedy	
Pacquiao: The Movie	Joel Lamangan	Jericho Rosales, Bea Alonzo	Drama	Star Cinema
Pamahiin	Rahyan Carlos	Dennis Trillo, Iya Villania, Paolo Contis	Horror/suspense	Viva Films & GMA Films
Ang Pamana	Romero Candido	Phoemela Baranda, Nonie Buencamino, Victor Neri	Supernatural thriller/horror	
Pitong Dalagita	Crisaldo Pablo	Angelica Panganiban, Yasmien Kurdi, Nadine Samonte, Valerie Concepcion, Cristine Reyes, Jay R, Iwa Moto	Drama	
Shake, Rattle & Roll 8	Mike Tuviera, Rahyan Carlos and Topel Lee	Episode 1: "13th Floor" - Bearwin Meily, Keanna Reeves, Roxanne Guinoo, Joseph Bitangcol, Janus Del Prado *Episode 2: "Yaya" - Sheryl Cruz, Iza Calzado, TJ Trinidad, Nene Tamayo, Nash Aguas, Boom Antonio, Debraliz Vallasote *Episode 3: "LRT" - Manilyn Reynes, Keempee de Leon, Eugene Domingo, Miko Palanca, IC Mendoza, Mhyco Aquino, Sergio Garcia, Cassandra Ponti, Ehra Madrigal, Empress Schuck, Dino Imperial	Horror/suspense	Regal Entertainment
Sukob	Chito S. Roño	Kris Aquino, Claudine Barretto	Horror/suspense	Star Cinema
Summer Heat	Brillante Mendoza	Juliana Palermo, Cherry Pie Picache, Johnny Delgado	Drama	
Super Noypi	Quark Henares	John Prats, Sandara Park, Polo Ravales, Katrina Halili, Jennylyn Mercado, Mark Herras, Monsour del Rosario, Aubrey Miles, Karla Estrada, Jao Mapa, Mon Confiado, Allan Paule	Fantasy	Regal Films
Tatlong Baraha	Toto Natividad	Lito Lapid, Mark Lapid, Maynard Lapid, Phoemela Barranda, Girlie Revilla, Jackie Rice, Bearwin Meily & Monsour del Rosario	Action	Violett Films
Till I Met You	Mark A. Reyes	Regine Velasquez, Robin Padilla, Eddie Garcia	Romance	Viva Films & GMA Films
Tulad ng Dati	Michael E. Sandejas	Jett Pangan, JB Leonor, Francis Reyes, Buddy Zabala, Carlos Balcells, Ping Medina, Agot Isidro, Mylene Dizon, Zoe Sandejas	Drama, music	
Txt	Mike Tuviera	Angel Locsin, Dennis Trillo, Oyo Sotto	Horror	Regal Entertainment & APT Entertainment
Wag Kang Lilingon	Jerry Lopez Sineneng; Quark Henares	Anne Curtis, Kristine Hermosa, Marvin Agustin	Horror	Star Cinema & Viva Films
White Lady	Jeff Tan	Angelica Panganiban, Pauleen Luna, Iwa Moto, Gian Carlos	Horror/suspense	Regal Films
You Are the One	Cathy Garcia-Molina	Toni Gonzaga, Sam Milby	Romance	Star Cinema
ZsaZsa Zaturnnah Ze Moveeh	Joel Lamangan	Pops Fernandez, Rustom Padilla, Alfred Vargas, Pauleen Luna, Chokoleit, Christian Vasquez, Say Alonzo and Zsa Zsa Padilla	Fantasy	Regal Films

== 2007 ==
Title	Director	Cast	Genre	Studio
2007
A Love Story	Maryo J. de los Reyes	Aga Muhlach, Maricel Soriano, Angelica Panganiban	Romance	Star Cinema
Agent X44	Joyce Bernal	Vhong Navarro, Pokwang, Mariel Rodriguez, Mura	Comedy	Star Cinema
Ala suerte ala muerte	Briccio Santos	Ana Capri		
Altar	Rico Maria Ilarde	Zanjoe Marudo, Dimples Romana	Horror	
Ang Cute ng Ina Mo	Wenn V. Deramas	Ai-Ai de las Alas, Luis Manzano, Anne Curtis	Comedy	Star Cinema and Viva Films
Angels	Gina Alajar, Dingdong Dantes, Mark A. Reyes	Angel Locsin, Marvin Agustin, Jennylyn Mercado, Patrick Garcia	Comedy/drama	Viva Films & GMA Films
Apat Dapat, Dapat Apat	Wenn V. Deramas	Rufa Mae Quinto, Candy Pangilinan, Eugene Domingo, Pokwang	Comedy	Viva Films
Ataul For Rent	Neal "Buboy" Tan	Irma Adlawan, Nonie Buencamino, Ina Alegre	Drama/satire	Artiste Entertainment Works International
Autohystoria	Raya Martin	Lowell Canlas	History	
Ay, Ayeng	Ed Palmos	Heart Evangelista	Drama	
Bahay Kubo	Joel Lamangan	Eric Quizon, Maricel Soriano, Marian Rivera, Shaina Magdayao, Yasmien Kurdi	Drama	Regal Entertainment
Batanes: Sa Dulo ng Walang Hanggan	Adolfo Alix Jr. John David Hukom	Iza Calzado, Ken Chu	Drama/romance	GMA Films
Desperadas	Joel Lamangan	Ruffa Gutierrez, Iza Calzado, Rufa Mae Quinto, Marian Rivera	Comedy	Regal Entertainment
Enteng Kabisote 4: Okay Ka, Fairy Ko: The Beginning of the Legend	Tony Y. Reyes	Vic Sotto, Kristine Hermosa	Fantasy/comedy	OctoArts Films
Faces of Love	Eddie Romero	Christopher de Leon, Angel Aquino, Juliana Palermo, Alfred Vargas	Drama	
Happy Hearts	Joel Lamangan	Shaina Magdayao, Rayver Cruz	Romance	
Hide and Seek	Rahyan Carlos	Jean Garcia, Eric Quizon, Jennica Garcia, Mart Escudero	Horror	
I've Fallen For You	Lino Cayetano	Gerald Anderson, Kim Chiu	Romance	Star Cinema
Katas ng Saudi	Jose Javier Reyes	Jinggoy Estrada, Lorna Tolentino		
Kubrador	Jeffrey Jeturian	Gina Pareño, Esther Planilla	Drama	
Ligalig	Cesar Montano	Cesar Montano, Bayani Agbayani, John Regala	Horror/suspense	
Mano Po 5	Joel Lamangan	Angel Locsin, Jennilyn Arceo, Richard Gutierrez	Romance	Regal Entertainment
Moreno	Crisaldo Pablo	Ynez Veneracion, Ray An Dulay	Drama	Cinemalaya
My Kuya's Wedding	Topel Lee	Ryan Agoncillo, Maja Salvador, Pauleen Luna	Comedy/romance	Regal Entertainment
One More Chance	Cathy Garcia-Molina	John Lloyd Cruz, Bea Alonzo	Romance	Star Cinema
Ouija	Topel Lee	Judy Ann Santos, Jolina Magdangal, Iza Calzado, Rhian Ramos	Horror	GMA Films
Paano Kita Iibigin	Joyce Bernal	Piolo Pascual, Regine Velasquez	Drama	Star Cinema
Pasukob	Wenn V. Deramas	Ai-Ai de las Alas, Rufa Mae Quinto, Allan K.	Comedy	OctoArts Films
The Promise	Mike Tuviera	Angel Locsin, Richard Gutierrez	Romance	GMA Films and Regal Entertainment
Resiklo	Mark A. Reyes	Bong Revilla Jr., Jennylyn Mercado, Dingdong Dantes	Action, fantasy, sci-fi	Imus Production
Rights	Various		Documentary	Southern Tagalog Exposure; Free Jonas Burgos Movement
Saan Nagtatago si Happiness	Florida M. Bautista and Real Florido	Andy Bais, Caridad Sanchez, Darling Lavinia	Drama/comedy	
Sakal, Sakali, Saklolo	Jose Javier Reyes	Judy Ann Santos, Ryan Agoncillo, Gloria Diaz, Gina Pareño	Romance, comedy	Star Cinema
Selda	Ellen Ramos, Paolo Villaluna	Emilio Garcia, Sid Lucero, Ara Mina	Drama	
Shake, Rattle & Roll 9	Paul Daza, Michael Tuviera, Toppel Lee	John Prats, Roxanne Guinoo, Dennis Trillo, Gina Alajar, Katrina Halili	Horror	Regal Entertainment
Signos	Aloy Adlawan	Luis Alandy, Irma Adlawan, Lauren Novero, Nancy Castiglione	Drama, horror, mystery	Kamurayaw Pictures
Silip	Joel Lamangan	Polo Ravales, Francine Prieto, Diana Zubiri	Horror/suspense	Seiko Films
Super Noypi	Jerry Lopez-Sineneng	Jennylyn Mercado, John Prats, Sandara Park, Mark Herras	Action/adventure	Regal Entertainment
Tiyanaks	Mark A. Reyes	J.C. de Vera, Jennylyn Mercado, Mark Herras	Horror/suspense	Regal Entertainment
Tribu	Jim Libiran		Crime/drama	
You Got Me	Cathy Garcia-molina	Sam Milby, Toni Gonzaga, Zanjoe Marudo	Romance	Star Cinema

== 2008 ==
Title	Director	Cast	Genre	Studio
2008
100	Chris Martinez	Mylene Dizon, Eugene Domingo, Tessie Tomas	Comedy/drama	Unitel Productions Inc.
A Very Special Love	Cathy Garcia-Molina	John Lloyd Cruz, Sarah Geronimo	Romantic comedy	Star Cinema and Viva Films
Anak ng Kumander	Jose Balagtas	Manny Pacquiao, Ara Mina, Valerie Concepcion	Action	
Ang Lihim ni Antonio	Joselito Altarejos	Kenjie Garcia, Josh Ivan Morales, Jiro Manio, Shamaine Centenera-Buencamino	Thriller/Drama	Digital Viva
Ang Tanging Ina Nyong Lahat	Wenn V. Deramas	Ai-Ai Delas Alas, Eugene Domingo	Comedy	Star Cinema
Baler	Mark Meily	Jericho Rosales, Anne Curtis	Drama	Viva Films
Banal	Cesar Apolinario	Paolo Contis, Christopher de Leon, Alfred Vargas	Action, suspense	
Caregiver	Chito S. Roño	Sharon Cuneta, John Estrada, Makisig Morales, John Manalo	Romance	Star Cinema
Dayo: Sa Mundo ng Elementalia	Robert Quilao	Nash Aguas, Katrina Legaspi, Michael V., Noel Trinidad, Nova Villa, Pokwang, Johnny Delgado	Adventure	Cutting Edge Productions
Desperadas 2	Joel Lamangan	Ruffa Gutierrez, Iza Calzado, Rufa Mae Quinto, Marian Rivera, Ogie Alcasid	Comedy	Regal Entertainment
For the First Time	Joyce Bernal	KC Concepcion, Richard Gutierrez	Romance	Star Cinema and Viva Films
Iskul Bukol 20 Years After (Ungasis and Escaleras Adventure)	Tony Y. Reyes	Tito Sotto, Vic Sotto, Joey De Leon	Comedy	APT Entertainment
Jay	Francis Javier Pasion	Baron Geisler, Coco Martin	Drama	Cinemalaya
Kurap	Roni Bertubin	Sherwin Ordonez, Jojit Lorenzo	Drama	Silangan Pictures
Magkaibigan	Jose Javier Reyes	Jinggoy Estrada, Christopher de Leon, Dawn Zulueta	Drama	Maverick Films
Manay Po 2	Joel Lamangan	Cherry Pie Picache, Rufa Mae Quinto, Polo Ravales, John Prats	Comedy	Regal Entertainment
My Best Friend's Girlfriend	Mark A. Reyes	Richard Gutierrez, Marian Rivera	Romance	Regal Entertainment and GMA Films
My Big Love	Jade Castro	Sam Milby, Toni Gonzaga, Kristine Hermosa	Romance	Star Cinema
My Monster Mom	Jose Javier Reyes	Annabelle Rama, Ruffa Gutierrez	Comedy	GMA Films and Regal Entertainment
My Only Ü	Cathy Garcia Molina	Toni Gonzaga, Vhong Navarro	Romance	Star Cinema
One Night Only	Jose Javier Reyes	Katrina Halili, Alessandra De Rossi, Diana Zubiri, Jennylyn Mercado, Valerie Concepcion	Comedy	Canary Films
One True Love	Mac Alejandre	Marian Rivera, Dingdong Dantes, Iza Calzado	Romance	Regal Entertainment and GMA Films
Ploning	Dante Nico Garcia	Judy Ann Santos	Drama	Panoramanila Philippines Co.
Shake, Rattle & Roll X	Topel Lee, Michael Tuviera	Roxanne Guinoo, JC De Vera, Kim Chiu, Gerald Anderson, Marian Rivera	Horror	Regal Entertainment
Supahpapalicious	Gilbert Perez	Vhong Navarro	Comedy	Star Cinema
When Love Begins	Jose Javier Reyes	Anne Curtis, Aga Muhlach	Romance	Star Cinema
Walang Kawala	Joel Lamangan	Polo Ravales, Joseph Bitangcol	Drama	DMV Entertainment

== 2009 ==
Title	Director	Cast	Genre	Studio
2009
Agaton & Mindy	Peque Gallaga	Chase Vega, Cherie Gil	Drama	APT Entertainment
Ang Darling Kong Aswang	Tony Y. Reyes	Vic Sotto, Cristine Reyes	Comedy	OctoArts Films
Ang Panday	Topel Lee	Bong Revilla, Iza Calzado	Fantasy	GMA Films
And I Love You So	Lauren Dyogi	Bea Alonzo, Sam Milby, Derek Ramsay	Romantic drama	Star Cinema
Aurora	Adolfo Alix Jr	Rosanna Roces, Sid Lucero, Kristoffer King	Sexy drama	Bicycle Pictures
Bente	Mel Chionglo	Jinggoy Estrada, Richard Gomez	Action Thriller	APT Entertainment
BFF: Best Friends Forever	Wenn V. Deramas	Sharon Cuneta, Ai-Ai Delas Alas	Comedy	Star Cinema
Booking		Anita Linda, Snooky Serna, Marco Morales	Drama	
Butas	Bong Ramos	Allen Dizon, Gwen Garci, Jolly JD, Marco Morales	Sexy drama	Leo Films
Big Night		Jordan Herrera, Jaycee Parker, Marco Morales	Sexy	Leo Films
Ded Na Si Lolo	Soxie Topacio	Roderick Paulate, Manilyn Reynes	Comedy	APT Entertainment
Hilot	Neil "Buboy" Tan	Melissa Mendez, Empress Schuck, Ricardo Cepeda, Glenda Garcia	Drama	Emerged Entertainment Productions
Independencia	Raya Martin	Tetchie Agbayani, Alessandra de Rossi, Sid Lucero	Historical drama	Arte France Cinéma
I Love You, Goodbye	Laurice Guillen	Angelica Panganiban, Derek Ramsay, Kim Chiu, Gabby Concepcion	Drama	Star Cinema
In My Life	Olivia Lamasan	Vilma Santos, John Lloyd Cruz, Luis Manzano, Vice Ganda	Romantic drama	Star Cinema
Isang Araw Lang	Daniel Razon	Daniel Razon, Emilio Garcia, Arnel Ignacio	Action	Breakthrough and Milestones Productions International
Isang Lahi	J.P. Tanchanco	Boy Abunda, AJ Dee, Marissa Delgado	Documentary	Tanchanco Trimedia Production
Kamoteng Kahoy	Maryo J. delos Reyes	Gloria Romero, Nash Aguas, Sharlene San Pedro, Buboy Villar	Drama	
Kimmy Dora: Kambal sa Kiyeme	Joyce Bernal	Eugene Domingo, Dingdong Dantes	Comedy	Spring Films
Kinatay	Brillante Mendoza	Coco Martin, Mercedes Cabral, Maria Isabel Lopez	Drama	Centerstage Productions
Litsonero	Lore Reyes	Karylle, Paolo Contis	Drama	APT Entertainment
Lola	Brillante Mendoza	Anita Linda, Rustica Carpio	Drama	Swift Productions; Centerstage Productions
Love Me Again	Rory B. Quintos	Piolo Pascual, Angel Locsin	Romance	Star Cinema
Love on Line	Tony Y. Reyes	Vic Sotto, Paula Taylor, Jose Manalo, Gina Pareno, Matt Evans, Melissa Ricks, Leo Martinez	Romantic comedy	M-Zet, OctoArts and APT Entertainment
Manila	Adolfo Alix Jr., Raya Martin	Piolo Pascual	Drama	Bicycle Pictures
Mano Po 6: A Mother's Love	Joel Lamangan	Sharon Cuneta, Christopher De Leon, Zsa Zsa Padilla, Heart Evangelista, Dennis Trillo	Fantasy	Regal Entertainment
Nobody, Nobody But... Juan	Enrico S. Quizon	Dolphy, Pokwang, Eddie Garcia, Gloria Romero	Drama, comedy	RVQ Productions
Nandito Ako Nagmamahal Sa'Yo	Maryo J. de los Reyes	Kris Bernal, Aljur Abrenica, Baron Geisler, Valeen Montenegro	Romantic drama	Regal Entertainment
OMG (Oh, My Girl!)	Dante Nico Garcia	Ogie Alcasid, Judy Ann Santos	Comedy	Regal Entertainment
Padre de Pamilya	Cesar E. Buendia	Ariel Rivera, Jacklyn Jose	Drama	Leb Telon
Padyak	Aloy Adlawan	Jay Aquitana, Baron Geisler, Irma Adlawan	Drama	Breaking the Box Productions
Pakpak	Francis Posadas	Jordan Herrera, Rain Escudero	Drama	A-Vic Production
Pasang Krus	Neal "Buboy" Tan	Rosanna Roces, Ketchup Eusebio, Empress Schuck	Drama	
Patient X	Yam Laranas		Horror	Viva Films
Pitik Bulag		Marco Alcaraz	Sexy drama	LVD
Roommate From Hell		James Blanco, Diane Medina, JC Parker, Biboy Ramirez	Comedy	Megavision
Shake, Rattle & Roll XI	Jessell Monteverde, Rico Gutierrez, Don Michael Perez	*Episode 1: "Diablo" - Maja Salvador Mark Anthony Fernandez Gina Alajar Joem Bascon Alex Castro Irma Adlawan Janice de Belen Paolo Bediones Jairus Aquino; *Episode 2: *Ukay-Ukay" - Ruffa Gutierrez Zoren Legaspi John Lapus Megan Young Miguel Faustmann Carlo Guevarra Philip Lazaro; *Episode 3: "Lamang Lupa" - Jennica Garcia, Rayver Cruz Mart Escudero Iya Villania Dominic Roco Felix Roco Bangs Garcia, Archi Adamos Julia Clarete	Horror	Regal Entertainment
Si Baning, si Maymay at ang asong si Bobo	Rommel Tolentino	Joana Evangelista, Jan Hicana, Simon Ibarra, Rio Locsin, Gene Largueza, Geraldine Tan	Comedy	Cinema One Originals
Status: Single	Jose Javier Reyes	Rufa Mae Quinto, Alfred Vargas, Paolo Contis	Comedy	Viva Films
Sumpa	Carlos Agustin, Melvin Brito	Joross Gamboa, Mark Gil, Mocha Uson	Thriller	Megavision
Sundo	Topel Lee	Robin Padilla, Sunshine Dizon, Katrina Halili	Horror, thriller	GMA Films
T2	Chito Rono	Maricel Soriano, Camille Prats, Mika Dela Cruz, Derek Ramsay	Horror	Star Cinema
Tawag	Brillante Mendoza	Coco Martin, Regine Angeles, Georgina Wilson, Miguel Gabriel, Mickey Ferriols	Horror, thriller	Sine-Pinoy Media Entertainment
Villa Estrella	Rico Maria Ilarde	Maja Salvador, Geoff Eigenmann, Shaina Magdayao, Jake Cuenca, Carmen Soo, Marco Alcaraz, John Estrada	Horror	Star Cinema
Wanted: Border	Ray Gibraltar	Rosanna Roces	Horror, thriller	Cinema One Originals
Wapakman	Topel Lee	Manny Pacquiao, Krista Ranillo, Bianca King	Fantasy	Solar Entertainment
When I Met U	Joel Lamangan	KC Concepcion, Richard Gutierrez	Romance	GMA Films and Regal Entertainment
Yaya and Angelina: The Spoiled Brat Movie	Mike Tuviera	Ogie Alcasid, Michael V.	Comedy	GMA Films and APT Entertainment
You Changed My Life	Cathy Garcia-Molina	John Lloyd Cruz, Sarah Geronimo	Romance	Star Cinema and Viva Films

== See also ==
- List of 2008 box office number-one films in the Philippines
- List of 2009 box office number-one films in the Philippines
