= John Apacible =

Filipino film and television actor

- Born: Enrique Rustia Apacible III; January 22, 1973; Cainta, Rizal, Philippines
- Died: March 20, 2011 (aged 38); Quezon City, Philippines
- Cause of death: Gunshot wound
- Occupation: Actor
- Years active: 1993–2011

Enrique Rustia Apacible III (January 22, 1973 – March 20, 2011), professionally known as John Apacible, was a Filipino television and film actor.

== Early life ==
He was born in Cainta, Rizal on January 22, 1973.

== Career ==
John Apacible's showbiz career took off in 1996 when he was launched as a leading man in Joey Gosiengfiao's film Nights of Serafina. Among his showbiz contemporaries also launched in the movie were Georgia Ortega (in her first title role) and Angelika dela Cruz. His hunk image enabled him to land successive leading man roles in various sexy films. Eventually he moved on to playing character roles in both TV and film.

Apacible appeared in other films such as Init ng Laman (1998) starring Sunshine Cruz, Bakit Pa? (1999) starring Jessa Zaragoza and Diether Ocampo, Luksong Tinik (1999) starring Lorna Tolentino, Phone Sex (1999) starring Ara Mina, Sugatang Puso (2000) starring Christopher de Leon and Lorna Tolentino, Tikim (2001) with Rodel Velayo, Hustler (2001) with Ricardo Cepeda and Maria Isabel Lopez, Sex Files (2002) with Halina Perez, Pinky Amador and Ana Capri, Nympha (2003) starring Maricar de Mesa, Takaw-tingin (2004) with Ynez Veneracion, then Lagot Ka Sa Kuya Ko (2006) starring Ronnie Ricketts and Pacquiao: The Movie (2006) starring Jericho Rosales.

Apacible's last television appearance was on ABS-CBN's Minsan Lang Kita Iibigin where he played a commandant of lead star Coco Martin. He became popular in the 1990s.

== Death ==
John Apacible died on March 20, 2011, when his uncle shot him during a drinking session. His remains lie in Heaven's Gate Memorial Park in Antipolo.

== Filmography ==
=== Television ===
Year	Title	Role	Notes
1997	Esperanza	Ricardo	
2002–2003	Basta't Kasama Kita	Abdon Lagdameo	
2002	Bituin	Wally	
2002	Kay Tagal Kang Hinintay	Marvo	
2007	Rounin		
2007	Mga Kuwento ni Lola Basyang	Tatay	
2007	Lupin	Maskardo	
2008	Maalaala Mo Kaya	Omar	Episode: "Sulat"
2009	Tayong Dalawa	Rex	
2009	Darna	Nestor	
2009	Obra		Episode: "Rowena Joy"
2010	Your Song: Maling Akala	Atty. Mark Peseta	
2011	Minsan Lang Kita Iibigin	Lt. Col Santiago	Last TV appearance

=== Film ===
Year	Title	Role
1996	Nights of Serafina	Anton
1996	Iligpit si Victor Sarraza	
1997	Shake, Rattle & Roll VI	Emil
1998	Init ng Laman	Allen
1999	Bakit Pa?	Louie
1999	Huwag Po... Huwag Po!	
1999	Luksong Tinik	Ernie
1999	Phone Sex	Patrick
1999	Laging Sariwa ang Sugat	Anton
2000	Shame	Dado
2000	Sugatang Puso	Dado
2001	Masikip Na ang Mundo Mo, Labrador	Alberto
2001	Onsehan	
2001	Cool Dudes 24/7	Madel's father
2001	Parehas ang Laban	Cpl. Zamora
2001	Tikim	Derek
2002	Hustler	Anthony
2002	Eskandalosa	
2002	Pistolero	Don Gustavo
2002	Ligaya... Pantasya ng Bayan	
2002	Tampisaw	Abel
2002	Sex Files	
2002	Biyahera	
2003	Kerida	
2003	Nympha	Beloy
2003	Bayarán	Douglas
2003	Punla	Samuel
2003	Captain Barbell	Gus
2003	Silang Mga Rampadora	Tom
2003	Katas	
2004	Sinful Nights	
2004	Check-Inn	
2004	I Will Survive	Salesman
2004	Sabel	Atty. Parungao
2004	Tag-Init	Rocky
2004	Takaw-Tingin	Carlo
2004	Krisanta, Iba Ka	
2004	Tukso si Charito 2	
2005	Uno	
2005	Sablay Ka Na... Pasaway Ka Pa...	Chino
2006	Lagot Ka sa Kuya Ko!	Mr. Fonacier
2006	Pacquiao: The Movie	Heckler
2007	Bahay Kubo: A Pinoy Mano Po!	Dencio
2008	Scaregivers	Ramon
2008	Ang Lihim ni Kurdapya	Benny
2009	Heavenly Touch	Mayor
2010	Dukot	
2010	Two Funeral's	Congressman Aguilar
2010	Mamarazzi	Hunk
2010	Pagananasa	Mr. Dante
2010	Shake, Rattle and Roll 12	Garbage man
