= Cheska =

Cheska is a given name. Notable people with the name include:

- Cheska Garcia (born 1980), Filipina actress
- Cheska Hull, England actress and one of the casts in the British television series Made in Chelsea
