= Pangarap na Bituin =

- Title card
- Genre: Drama; Musical
- Created by: ABS-CBN Studios
- Based on: Sana'y Wala Nang Wakas (1986) by Leroy Salvador
- Developed by: ABS-CBN Studios; Rondel Lindayag
- Written by: Regina Amigo; Philip Louie King
- Directed by: Erick C. Salud; Trina N. Dayrit
- Starring: Sarah Geronimo; Rica Peralejo; Maja Salvador
- Theme music composer: Willy Cruz
- Ending theme: "Pangarap na Bituin" by Sarah Geronimo
- Country of origin: Philippines
- Original language: Filipino
- No. of episodes: 70

Production
- Executive producers: Carlo Katigbak; Cory Vidanes; Laurenti Dyogi; Roldeo Endrinal
- Producer: Emilio Paul E. Siojo
- Production locations: Metro Manila; Bacoor, Cavite; Albay, Philippines
- Running time: 23–31 minutes
- Production company: Dreamscape Entertainment Television

Original release
- Network: ABS-CBN
- Release: September 3 – December 7, 2007

Related
- Bituing Walang Ningning (2006); 1DOL (2010); May Isang Pangarap (2013)

Pangarap na Bituin (lit. 'Dream Star'/English: The Star We Dreamt) is a 2007 Philippine television drama series broadcast by ABS-CBN. The series is based on a 1986 Philippine film Sana'y Wala Nang Wakas. Directed by Erick C. Salud and Trina N. Dayrit, it stars Sarah Geronimo, Rica Peralejo and Maja Salvador. It aired on the network's Primetime Bida line up and worldwide on TFC from September 3 to December 7, 2007, replacing Walang Kapalit and was replaced by Maging Sino Ka Man: Ang Pagbabalik.

The series is streaming online on YouTube.

== Synopsis ==
The Jewel Sisters are a singing pop trio who will walk the royal yet sometimes rocky road to fame. After the tragedy that left their biological parents seemingly dead, Sapphire, Emerald, and Ruby are accidentally separated from one another. But one dream will make their paths cross, and together, they will make music that fans all over the country will deeply adore.

At first, they will all think that their love for one another as sisters will see them through the challenging life as celebrities. But little did they know that there is more to dream than the wealth and glory. Sapphire is willing to do whatever it takes to get ahead and be with Terrence Rodriguez. Emerald falls in love with Terrence, but the manipulative manager Alberta will stand against their love. Emerald and Terrence secretly becomes an item without anyone knowing except for Cocoy, Emerald's adoptive father. Ruby will battle with her own insecurities to gain the self-esteem she needs.

Later Bridgette Ramirez revealed the real Sapphire Gomez and the real Mother of the Jewel Sisters. Bridgette also finds out that her father died because of Lena, the impostor mother of the three. After these incidents, the Jewel Sisters, together with their mother Jade Gomez, planned to have a concert. This concert is their happiest moment together as a family and Ruby and Jeffrey become a couple, while Alberta Tuazon apologized to her husband.

== Cast and characters ==
=== Main cast ===
Actor	Character	Character Description
Sarah Geronimo	Emerald Gomez	A sweet yet tough 19-year-old who aspires to become a singer. After being orphaned when she was a child, Emerald was taken into the care of Cocoy Mendoza. Eventually, Emerald reunited with her two sisters: Ruby & Sapphire, and they will be known as the pop star trio, The Jewel Sisters. She also fell in love with her best friend, Terrence.
Jericho Rosales	Terrence Rodriguez	The handsome and talented rockstar. He was a comic yet serious childhood friend of Emerald, until he was taken by his aunt Alberta. Terrence later met Emerald and he helped her become a famous singer, and eventually fell in love with her.
Rica Peralejo	Bridgette Ramirez	Sapphire's impostor, she's hired by Alberta Tuazon to be pitted against Emerald and Ruby in return of her father's medical assistance. She will soon develop a secret love for Terrence, and slowly tries to pull him towards her and away from Emerald.
Maja Salvador	Ruby Gomez	Youngest among the Jewel Sisters. She was adopted by Berns Bautista who named her as Kimberly Bautista. Her dream of becoming a singer will lead her to Emerald and Sapphire. Ruby is obedient in nature, but her insecurities regarding her voice will be her greatest obstacle in life.
Jay-R Siaboc	Jeffrey Tuazon	Son of Alberta and Benedict Tuazon and cousin/half-brother of Terrence. Jeffrey also dreams of becoming a singer and he also became Ruby's boyfriend.
Alex Gonzaga	Chorva Ayala Gomez	The bubbly and supportive best friend of Emerald. Later adopted by the Gomez family in the penultimate episode.
Cherry Pie Picache	Alberta Tuazon	The manipulative and domineering aunt and manager of Terrence. She will secretly find a way to destroy Emerald's career to keep the young singer away from Terrence. It was later revealed that she's the real mother of Terrence.
Joel Torre	Cocoy Mendoza	An NGO worker who adopted Emerald. Being an erstwhile singer himself, Cocoy will train and encourage Emerald in becoming a successful singer. A loving and devoted father, Cocoy will see Emerald through her journey to fame.
Rio Locsin	Lena Ramirez	The woman hired by Alberta to pose as the mother of the Jewel Sisters. She will become the manager of the three, although the job will prove to be beyond her abilities. Lena is Jade Gomez's impostor. She is mental her best friend says.
Pooh Garcia	Berns Bautista	Ruby's adoptive father who renamed her Kimberly. As a showbiz reporter, Berns always brings Kimberly to showbiz gatherings hoping the child will be discovered and become a singer.
John Arcilla	Atty. Benedict Tuazon	A respectable lawyer and husband of Alberta but he is unaware of his wife's dark secrets.

=== Extended cast ===
Actor	Character	Character Description
Ian Galliguez	Manang	Nanny of Jeffrey Tuazon
Heart Evangelista	Cassandra "Cassie" Salcedo	Terrence's on and off again fiancé. Before she died, she sincerely accepted that Terrence and Emerald are meant to be together.
Christopher de Leon	Carlo Gomez	The biological father of Emerald, Ruby, and Sapphire.
Sandy Andolong	Jade Gomez	The biological mother of Emerald, Ruby, and Sapphire who turns out to be alive after years of disappearance in the Philippines. Her character was reintroduced living in Canada.
Nikki Gil	Sapphire Gomez	The eldest of the Jewel Sisters, the true sister of Emerald and Ruby. When her parents died, Sapphire was separated from her sisters. She will eventually discover her true identity and reunited with her two younger sisters; Emerald & Ruby. Her character was discovered in a mental institution where her impostor performed. Sapphire was later reunited with her family.
William Lorenzo	Jimbo	Terrence's biological father.
Bembol Roco	Alex Rodriguez	Terrence's adoptive father; Alberta's brother.
Boots Anson-Roa	Perla Ledesma	Mother of Jade Gomez; grandmother of The Jewel Sisters.
Nikki Bacolod	Abby Tugatog	One of Alberta's talents.
Timmy Boy Sta. Maria	Buboy Valenzuela	Terrence's handler; Alberta's staff member.
Jaime Fabregas	Louie Salcedo	Cassie's father and the producer of Emerald's first single.
Arlene Muhlach	Karen Magno	Friend of Berns who posed as his partner during the adoption of Ruby.
Maribeth Bichara	Andrea Tuazon	Alberta's sister in law.
Nanette Inventor	Mother Rose	The mother superior of the orphanage where Terrence, Ruby and Emerald stayed.
Phoebe Kay Arbotante	Young Ruby	Young Ruby was played and roled by Phebe Khae also known as Phoebe Kay Arbotante. She was the youngest daughter of Carlo and Jade Gomez and the youngest among the three (3). She stayed under the big truck during the Mayon Volcano erupted and she was adopted by Berns when Cocoy gave Emerald, Terrence and Ruby herself to "bahay ampunan".
Angel Sy	Young Emerald	
Ronald Jaimeer	Young Terrence	
Edison Tan	....	
Kathryn Bernardo	Young Chorva	
Nikki Bagaporo	Young Sapphire	

== Production ==
The drama was loosely based on 1986 film Sana'y Wala Nang Wakas and was going to feature Rachelle Ann Go and Yeng Constantino with Sarah Geronimo as Sharon Cuneta's character however changes were made to fit the storyline with Maja Salvador and Rica Peralejo replacing Go and Constantino.

== Reception ==
The pilot episode garnered a total rating of 27% according to AGB Nielsen in Mega Manila. Its lowest was 20.6% while the highest was its final episode which garnered 29.6% Its finale reached 40.3% in the Nationwide ratings (NUTAM).

== Soundtrack ==
Pangarap na Bituin OST

Soundtrack album by Various artists
- Released: November 2007
- Label: Viva Records, Star Records

=== Track listing ===
Philippine release
No.	Title	Writer(s)	Artist(s)	Length
1.	"Pangarap na Bituin"	Willy Cruz	Sarah Geronimo
2.	"Magsimula Ka"		Jericho Rosales
3.	"Tara Tena"		Sarah Geronimo and Maja Salvador
4.	"Same Ground"		Sarah Geronimo
5.	"Naaalala Ka"	Rey Valera	Jericho Rosales and Sarah Geronimo
6.	"Manila"		Maja Salvador
7.	"If You Could Read My Mind"		Rica Peralejo
8.	"Sundan ang Bituin"		Sarah Geronimo
9.	"Kaibigan"		Nikki Bagaporo
10.	"Pangarap na Bituin"	Willy Cruz	The Jewels

International release
No.	Title	Writer(s)	Artist(s)	Length
1.	"Pangarap na Bituin"	Willy Cruz	Sarah Geronimo
2.	"Di Ka Mawawala sa Puso Ko"		Sarah Geronimo and Jericho Rosales
3.	"Kung Ako na Lang Sana"		Sarah Geronimo
4.	"Manila"		Maja Salvador
5.	"Sundan Mo ang Iyong Bituin"		Sarah Geronimo
6.	"Tanging Ikaw"		Jericho Rosales
7.	"Same Ground"		Sarah Geronimo
8.	"Pangarap na Mahal"		Jay-R Siaboc and Maja Salvador
9.	"Ako'y Sa'yo, Ika'y Akin Lamang"		Sarah Geronimo
10.	"If You Could Read my Mind"		Rica Peralejo
11.	"Pangarap na Bituin"	Willy Cruz	The Jewels

== See also ==
- List of ABS-CBN Studios original drama series
- List of programs broadcast by ABS-CBN
