= Xerex Xaviera =

Adult column

Xerex Xaviera is an adult column in Abante tabloid that first started as a sex advice column in July, 1988 which was a creation of 5 young men. From a sex advice column, it has evolved into a literary column about sexual exploits and experiences of letter-senders and a platform for its readers' sexual fantasies.

== Overview ==
Abante tabloid runs a column written by an anonymous Xerex Xaviera in 1988 for sex advices to letter senders. It has eventually evolved about sex exploits and experiences by supposed letter senders. The column was said to be the Filipino counterpart of the book by Xaviera Hollander Happy Hooker. The newspaper tabloid gains popularity as many adults are more buying the newspaper because of the stories from the Xerex Xaviera column.

In 2004, the tabloid stopped publishing the column when it shifted into an all family newspaper.

== Name origin ==
The name Xerex Xaviera was coined by five young men. One of them was fond of reading Playboy magazine and Penthouse magazine and Xaviera Hollander was a writer that they admired. As they wanted to create a Filipino version of Xaviera Hollander. While thinking on how they would create a Filipino name for Xaviera Hollander, one of them proposed to just do a Xerox copy of Hollander's name. From the word Xerox they created the name Xerex, and thus the name Xerex Xaviera was created.

== Xerex film ==
On April 30, 2003, Regal Films released a trilogy movie of the said adult tabloid column featuring Aubrey Miles, Ynez Veneracion, Jon Hall, Kalani Ferreria and Jake Roxas. The film was directed by Mel Chionglo. The movie is composed of three episodes as seen from the perspective of the fictional sex guru: "Kama" which is about a teenage girl's exploration of sexuality, "O" which is about an engaged woman's dalliances with a beach lifeguard and "Butas" which is about voyeurism through a hole in the wall.

The movie was promoted through a photo exhibit at the SM Megamall. However, the Movie and Television Review and Classification Board deemed the photos "too sexy and suggestive" and ordered its pullout.
