= Aubrey Miles =

Filipino actress

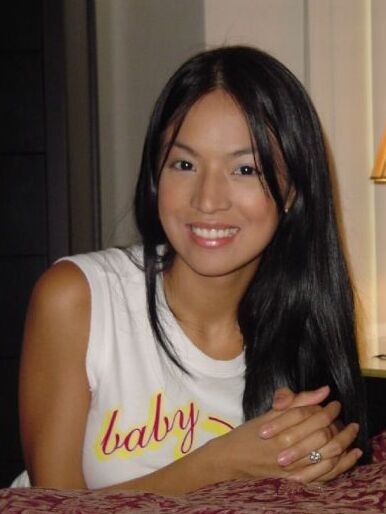
- Miles, photographed in 2004
- Born: Aubrey Santos Sandel; March 16, 1980 (age 46); Caloocan, Metro Manila, Philippines
- Occupations: Actress, model, television host, singer
- Years active: 1998–present
- Height: 1.68 m (5 ft 6 in)
- Spouse: Troy Montero (m. 2022)
- Partner: JP Obligacion
- Children: 3

Aubrey Miles Santos Sandel-Miller (born March 16, 1980) is a Filipino television host, singer, model, and actress.

== Early life ==
Aubrey Sandel was born on March 16, 1980, in Caloocan to Victorino Sandel and Maria Perla Santos. She was the third child of the couple's four children. She was named after the song "Aubrey" by Bread. Her parents separated when she was fifteen years old, and she stayed with her mother.

At nineteen years old, Miles starred on GMA sitcoms Beh Bote Nga and German Moreno's Best Friends. Between show business assignments, Miles joined beauty pageants which provided her with a steady income.

She finished her secondary education at La Consolacion College – Caloocan. She then majored in voice and minored in piano at the University of Santo Tomas Conservatory of Music. She dropped out during her second year when film producer Dondon Monteverde signed her up to a three-year, eight-film contract with Regal Films.

== Career ==
Miles' stage surname was adopted from the song "Miles Away" by German Moreno. She made her film debut as Ditas, a student who moonlights as a prostitute in the 2002 film Prosti directed by Erik Matti. Her role involved nudity and graphic sex scenes with her on-screen romantic interest, Jay Manalo. Highly successful at the box office, the film grossed ₱29 million. To date, Prosti remains her highest-grossing movie. The success in the titular role led to other movie offers, as well as product endorsement deals from companies such as Bench (a clothing company in the Philippines). After Prosti, Miles starred in the movie Xerex (based on a tabloid sex advice column), where she played three different roles. Miles' next movie, Sanib, saw her play a character who is possessed by demons.

After securing a contract with the ABS-CBN television network, she appeared as co-host of the daily noontime show Masayang Tanghali Bayan, and in several ABS-CBN sitcoms. As part of a strategy to build wider appeal, Miles also began appearing in more family friendly movie roles, in films like Sanib, A Beautiful Life, and Gagamboy – Regal Film's 2003 Metro Manila Film Festival entry – as actor Vhong Navarro's love interest.

Miles has thrice appeared on the cover of FHM Philippines; she was a covergirl in 2002, 2004 – depicted covered in gold-paint for the magazine's 50th issue (it was "revived" in 15th anniversary of FHM in March 2015, portrayed by Fil-Malay model Nicole Alexandria), and in 2009. Miles was also one of three FHM Calendar Girls along with Maui Taylor and Diana Zubiri for the FHM 2003 calendar.

Teaming up with real-life best friend Jacqueline Yu, Miles was a contestant in The Amazing Race Asia 1, where they were the second team eliminated in leg three. She also joined Survivor Philippines: Celebrity Showdown and made it all the way to the end, Day 36 with Ervic Vijandre, Solenn Heussaff, and Akihiro Sato as the show's "Final Four". She was voted out live and became the 7th member of the jury. She finished in fourth place.

For 12 years, she still included to the FHM 100 Sexiest Woman, which Diana Zubiri for 13 years and Angel Locsin and Jennylyn Mercado in 11-year run. She is the one of Villains in Shining Inheritance an adaptation of Korean drama Brilliant Legacy along with Kyline Alcantara, Roxie Smith, Glydel Mercado and Wendell Ramos.

In 2026, Miles was part of the 20 "lucky stars" selected in the game show Kapamilya Deal or No Deal and eventually picked as a contestant on the episode airing May 9 (and on the rerun aired September 6), where she won ₱300 for her chosen charity.

== Personal life ==
Miles has a son named John Maurie Sandel Obligacion, with her former boyfriend JP Obligacion. She was 20 years old when Maurie was born on March 18, 2001. Before a 2009 interview with Boy Abunda, she had hid her son from the public and consistently denied rumors to protect her career and sexy image.

She has been in a relationship with actor Troy Montero since 2003. They have two children together: son Hunter Cody Sandel Miller born on October 3, 2008, and daughter Rocket Miller born on December 14, 2018. The couple married on June 9, 2022, in a ceremony presided by Mandaluyong mayor Carmelita Abalos.

She operates a pawnshop business, A-MILES Pawnshop.

== Filmography ==
=== Film ===
- Prosti (2002) as Ditas
- Xerex (2003) as Breezy/Marge/Jasmin
- Sanib (2003) as Melissa
- Xerex the Series First Edition (2004) (Video)
- Gagamboy (2004) as Liana
- Kuya (2004) as Chloe
- Singles (2004) as Susie
- Beautiful Life (2004) as Daisy
- Pa-siyam (2004) as Ruth
- Lisensyadong Kamao (2005) as Fanie
- Exodus: Tales from the Enchanted Kingdom (2005) as Bangkila
- Super Noypi (2006)
- Si Agimat at si Enteng Kabisote (2011)

=== Television ===
| Year | Title | Role | Notes |
|---|---|---|---|
| 1998–1999 | Best Friends | Herself/Cast member | |
| 1999–2003 | Beh Bote Nga | Dion | |
| 2003–2004 | Masayang Tanghali Bayan | Herself/Co-host | |
| 2003–2005 | Home Along da Airport | J.Lo | |
| 2005–2006 | Bora | Mercy | |
| 2006 | The Amazing Race Asia 1 | Herself/Racer | with partner Jacqueline Yu |
| 2007 | Rounin | Vega | 2007 (TV miniseries) |
| 2010 | It's Showtime | Herself/Guest judge | |
| 2010 | Survivor Philippines: Celebrity Showdown | Herself/Castaway | |
| 2011 | Amaya | Magwayen | |
| 2011 | Survivor Philippines: Celebrity Doubles Showdown | Herself/Guest/Co-host | |
| 2012 | Maalaala Mo Kaya | Sylvia | Episode: "Tinapay" |
| 2015 | Aquino & Abunda Tonight | Herself/Guest | |
| 2015 | Pasión de Amor | Rosario "Rio" Montes | |
| 2016 | Maalaala Mo Kaya | Rosalinda | Episode: "Picture" |
| 2016 | Karelasyon: Sabong | Rheena | |
| 2016 | Karelasyon: Tenant | Tina | |
| 2016 | A1 Ko Sa 'Yo | Precious | |
| 2017 | All Star Videoke | Herself/Guest | |
| 2017 | Road Trip | Herself/Guest | |
| 2018 | Ang Forever Ko'y Ikaw | Maya | |
| 2024–2025 | Shining Inheritance | Sonia dela Cuesta-Dela Costa | Supporting Antagonist / Protagonist |
| 2024–2025 | It's Showtime | Herself/Guest | |
| 2025 | Sins of the Father | Ellen Williams | |
| 2025 | Rainbow Rumble | Herself/Contestant | Season 2; Episode 22 |
| 2025 | Tadhana | Cynthia | |
| 2026 | Kapamilya Deal or No Deal | Herself (Briefcase #11)/Contestant | Season 6; Episode 5 |
