= Selda =

- Gender: Feminine
- Language: Turkish, German, Yiddish

Origin
- Origin: Old German
- Meaning: "grey battle; dark battle", "strong woman'.

Other names
- Alternative spelling: Zelda

Selda is a Turkish feminine given name.

== People ==
- Selda Akgöz (born 1993), Turkish footballer
- Selda Alkor (born 1943), Turkish actress
- Selda Bağcan (born 1948), Turkish singer
- Selda Ekiz (born 1984), Norwegian presenter
- Selda Gunsel, Turkish American mechanical engineer
