= List of 2009 box office number-one films in the Philippines =

This is a list of films which have placed number one at the weekend box office in the Philippines during 2009.

== Number-one films ==
†	This implies the highest-grossing movie of the year.

#	Weekend End Date	Film	Total Weekend Gross	Notes
1	January 11, 2009	Bedtime Stories	$885,128	^{[A]}
2	January 18, 2009	Love Me Again*	$1,292,766	^{[A]}
3	January 25, 2009	Underworld: Rise of the Lycans	$1,167,889	^{[A]}
4	February 1, 2009	Underworld: Rise of the Lycans	$1,115,244	^{[A]}
5	February 8, 2009	Underworld: Rise of the Lycans	$786,102	^{[A]}
6	February 15, 2009	When I Met U*	$1,605,527	^{[A]}
7	February 22, 2009	When I Met U*	$1,181,182	^{[A]}
8	March 1, 2009	You Changed My Life* †	$2,594,627	^{[A]}
9	March 9, 2009	You Changed My Life* †	$1,765,821	^{[A]}
10	March 15, 2009	You Changed My Life* †	$1,645,821	^{[A]}
11	March 22, 2009	Sundo*	$1,185,589	^{[A]}
12	March 29, 2009	Knowing	$1,265,772	^{[A]}
13	April 5, 2009	Fast & Furious	$1,326,681	^{[A]}
14	April 12, 2009	T2 (Tenement 2)*	$1,008,787	^{[A]}
15	April 19, 2009	T2 (Tenement 2)*	$859,486	^{[A]}
16	April 26, 2009	T2 (Tenement 2)*	$594,035	^{[A]}
17	May 3, 2009	X-Men Origins: Wolverine	$1,217,454	^{[A]}
18	May 10, 2009	X-Men Origins: Wolverine	$966,261	^{[A]}
19	May 17, 2009	Angels & Demons	$2,207,296	^{[A]}
20	May 24, 2009	Angels & Demons	$1,805,550	^{[A]}
21	May 31, 2009	Terminator Salvation	$1,609,883	^{[A]}
22	June 7, 2009	Terminator Salvation	$1,148,013	^{[A]}
23	June 14, 2009	Terminator Salvation	$1,035,497	^{[A]}
24	June 21, 2009	The Taking of Pelham 1 2 3	$625,791	^{[A]}
25	June 28, 2009	Transformers: Revenge of the Fallen	$3,786,501	^{[A]}
26	July 5, 2009	Transformers: Revenge of the Fallen	$2,886,927	^{[A]}
27	July 12, 2009	Transformers: Revenge of the Fallen	$1,530,970	^{[A]}
28	July 19, 2009	Harry Potter and the Half-Blood Prince	$2,177,955	^{[A]}
29	July 26, 2009	Harry Potter and the Half-Blood Prince	$813,426	^{[A]}
30	August 2, 2009	The Proposal	$444,756	^{[A]}
31	August 9, 2009	G.I. Joe: The Rise of Cobra	$1,054,443	^{[A]}
32	August 16, 2009	G.I. Joe: The Rise of Cobra	$875,537	^{[A]}
33	August 23, 2009	Up	$956,913	^{[A]}
34	August 30, 2009	Up	$843,913	^{[A]}
35	September 6, 2009	Kimmy Dora*	$1,416,077	^{[A]}
36	September 13, 2009	Kimmy Dora*	$1,187,406	^{[A]}
37	September 20, 2009	In My Life*	$2,056,648	^{[A]}
38	October 4, 2009	Yaya and Angelina: The Spoiled Brat Movie*	$1,244,551	^{[A]}
39	October 11, 2009	G-Force	$1,036,447	^{[A]}
40	October 18, 2009	G-Force	$697,249	^{[A]}
41	October 25, 2009	(500) Days of Summer	$607,895	^{[A]}
42	November 1, 2009	Michael Jackson's This Is It	$1,245,765	^{[A]}
43	November 8, 2009	Michael Jackson's This Is It	$960,546	^{[A]}
44	November 15, 2009	2012	$1,932,954	^{[A]}
45	November 22, 2009	The Twilight Saga: New Moon	$3,702,957	^{[A]}
46	November 29, 2009	The Twilight Saga: New Moon	$2,591,242	^{[A]}
47	December 6, 2009	2012	$247,914	^{[A]}
48	December 13, 2009	The Twilight Saga: New Moon	$758,628	^{[A]}
49	December 20, 2009	Avatar	$1,441,170	^{[A]}
50	December 27, 2009	Ang Panday*	$2,105,829	
51	December 30-January 3, 2010	Avatar	$203,086	

*means of Philippine origin.
