= Aya Medel =

Filipino actress and restaurateur

- Born: November 5, 1980 (age 45); Albay, Philippines
- Occupations: Restaurateur, former actress
- Years active: 1997–2002; 2014
- Children: 2

Aya Medel (born November 5, 1980) is a Filipina former actress, chef, and restaurateur. She was dubbed as the "Papaya Queen" in the 1990s.

== Career ==
At age 14, Medel was spotted by a modeling agent after she became first runner-up in Mutya ng Tabaco in Albay. She went from modeling to acting in erotic films such as Asong Ulol, Totoy Mola, Molata, Babae sa Bubungang Lata, Padre Kalibre, and Sisa. Medel also starred in foreign films such as Naked Nights, Love and Desire Troublesome Nights (a comedy film shown in Hong Kong), and Total Aikido (a film shown in Japan). During her showbiz stint, Medel also became a television host for the anthology drama, Daisy Siete, and the longest noontime variety show, Eat Bulaga.

Medel has left her showbiz career to become a chef. She now owns several restaurants.

== Personal life ==
When Medel quit her acting career in 2002, she married Yoji Hayakawa, a Japanese businessman with whom she has two children. They divorced. Medel studied to become a chef at the Center of Asian Culinary School and started a restaurant business in Tabaco, Albay.

== Filmography ==
=== Film ===
Year	Title
1997	Padre Kalibre
1997	Totoy Mola
1997	Sya'y Nagdadalaga
1997	No Read, No Write
1997	Nakalimot sa pag-ibig
1997	Masarap, masakit ang magmahal
1997	Kapag nasukol ang asong ulol
1997	Akin Ka Lamang
1998	Bawal
1998	Squala
1998	Kargado
1998	Alipin ng Aliw
1998	Laruang Buhay
1998	Troublesome Nights 4
1998	Notoryus
1998	Babae sa Bubungang Lata
1998	Kaya ko pero Masakit
1998	Shirley
1999	Droga, Pagtatapat ng mga Babaeng Addict
1999	Molata
1999	Sisa
1999	Wala ka nang Lupang Tatapakan
1999	Nikilado
1999	Hilig ng Katawan
1999	Pamasak Butas
1999	Gatilyo
1999	Largado, Ibabalik kita sa pinanggalingan mo!
1999	Sindak
1999	Tatlong Makasalanan
1999	Dalagang Dagat
2000	Gawin sa Dilim 2
2000	Basta Tricycle Driver... Sweet Lover
2001	Duwag lang ang Sumusuko
2001	Venus: Diosa ng Kagandahan
2001	Naked Nights
2002	Eva, Lason kay Adan
2002	Bukang Bibig
2002	Pagsaluhan
2002	Sugat, Walang Paghilom
2002	Gising na si Adan

=== Television ===
Year	Title
1997	Esperanza
1999	Maalaala Mo Kaya
2001	Sa Puso Ko Iingatan Ka
2014	Seasons of Love
2014	Magpakailanman: Ang Ina sa Gitna ng Tsunami
