= Cheska Garcia =

Filipino actress (born 1980)

Cheska Garcia Kramer
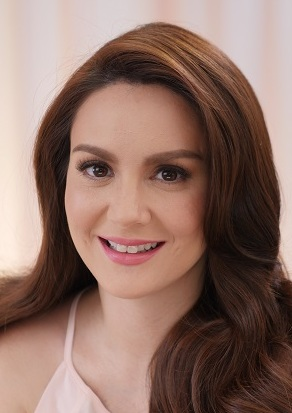
- Cheska Garcia in 2016
- Born: Francesca Marie Velasco Garcia; 24 July 1980 (age 46); Makati, Metro Manila, Philippines
- Occupations: Actress, model
- Years active: 1992–present
- Spouse: Doug Kramer (m. 2008)
- Children: 3
- Relatives: Patrick Garcia (brother); Sharmaine Arnaiz (cousin)

Francesca Marie "Cheska" (Note: Sometimes spelled as "Chesca".) Velasco Garcia-Kramer (born Francesca Marie Velasco Garcia; July 24, 1980) is a Filipino actress and model.

== Early life ==
Cheska Garcia was born in Makati, Metro Manila, Philippines to Francisco Pablo Pellicer Garcia, a Spanish mestizo, and Maria Celeste Dahlia Villalobos Velasco, an Ilongga from Roxas City, Capiz. She is the middle of three children. Her younger brother, Patrick, is also an actor. Her older brother, Pichon, has appeared in many commercials. The actresses Sharmaine Arnaiz and Bunny Paras, who are sisters, are her maternal cousins.

== Career ==
In 1992, Garcia began her television career, along with her brother Patrick; both appeared as cast members for Ang TV until 1996.

In 2015, Garcia hosted Mommy Hacks, a parenting lifestyle show on CNN Philippines, with Rica Peralejo-Bonifacio. The show is renewed for a second season but was renamed Mommy Manual.

Onscreen she is often cast as the female antagonist.

== Personal life ==
On October 9, 2008, Garcia married Doug Kramer, a professional basketball player in the Philippine Basketball Association for the GlobalPort. They have three children - Clair Kendra, Scarlett Louvelle, and Gavin Phoenix. She chose to give up her show business career to become a full-time mother.

On April 22, 2024, Garcia mourned the passing of her mother, Maria Celeste Dahlia Villalobos Velasco.

== Filmography ==
=== Film ===
Year	Title	Role	Note(s)	Ref(s).
1997	F.L.A.M.E.S.: The Movie	Dianne		
2003	Sukdulan	Claire		
2005	Uno			
2006	Don't Give Up on Us	Sabina		

=== Television ===
- Ang TV as Self
- Gimik as Corrine Apostol
- Tropang Trumpo
- Esperanza as Joanna
- Sana ay Ikaw na Nga as Charity Gaston
- Encantadia as Aure
- Us Girls
- Agawin Mo Man ang Lahat as Sissy Lizadores-Valverde
- Ako si Kim Samsoon as Nicole
- Iisa Pa Lamang as Tracy
- Carlo J. Caparas' Totoy Bato
- It's Showtime Herself/Guest
- Mommy Hacks (2015)
- Mommy Manual (2016)

== Awards ==
- Ulirang Ina Awards Foundation, Inc.
- Tanyag na Ulirang Ina Award 2017
