= Uno (2005 film) =

Filipino action film

- Directed by: Ronn-Rick
- Written by: Ronnie Ricketts; Lito N. Mena; Ricardo Cepeda
- Starring: Ronnie Ricketts; Monsour del Rosario
- Cinematography: Rey de Leon
- Edited by: Rudy Cabrales
- Music by: Tony Cortez
- Production company: Rocketts Productions
- Release date: January 19, 2005
- Country: Philippines
- Language: Filipino

Uno is a 2005 Filipino action thriller film directed by Ronnie Ricketts (as Ronn-Rick) and co-written by Ricketts, Lito N. Mena and Ricardo Cepeda. About an assassin intending to retire who finds himself the target of another assassin, it stars Ricketts and Monsour del Rosario alongside Danica Sotto, Cheska Garcia, Dinky Doo, Erica Fuente, Boy Roque, T.J. Trinidad and Cepeda. Produced by Ricketts' production company Rocketts Productions, it was given a limited theatrical release on January 19, 2005. The film is noted for being one of the few action films produced by the Philippine film industry in the mid-to-late 2000s.

== Cast ==
- Ronnie Ricketts as Niko
- Monsour del Rosario as Mike
- Mark Gil
- Ricardo Cepeda
- Dinky Doo
- Danica Sotto
- Chesca Garcia
- T.J. Trinidad
- Erica Fuente
- Ella Marie
- Mike Gayoso
- John Apacible
- Bruce Ricketts
- Mila Ocampo
- Jeffrey Santos
- Edgar Mande
- Marie Ricketts
- Jessa Marie
- Boy Roque
- Topher Ricketts
- Vic Felipe
- Dr. Rimando Saguin
- Rey Bejar
- Jay Yulo
- Dong Serrano
- Rodel Bansil
- Jonathan Gabriel
- Dante Javier

== Production ==
Actor Monsour del Rosario stated that the film's story is inspired by the 1995 film Assassins starring Sylvester Stallone and Antonio Banderas.

Ronnie Ricketts' six-year-old daughter Marie insisted on being part of the cast of Uno as she aspired to become an actress, to which he accepted.

== Release ==
Uno was released in SM Supermalls theaters on January 19, 2005. Playwright Nestor U. Torre, writing for the Philippine Daily Inquirer, noted how the film was released during a period when action films in the country largely ceased being produced by film studios due to the local film industry undergoing a financial slump in the 2000s.
