= List of 2008 box office number-one films in the Philippines =

This is a list of films which have placed number one at the weekend box office in the Philippines during 2008.

== Number-one films ==
†	This implies the highest-grossing movie of the year.

#	Weekend End Date	Film	Total Weekend Gross	Notes
1	January 13, 2008	National Treasure: Book of Secrets	$2,153,595	
2	January 20, 2008	National Treasure: Book of Secrets	$1,641,524	
3	January 27, 2008	Aliens vs. Predator: Requiem	$1,392,562	
4	February 3, 2008	Cloverfield	$1,308,983	
5	February 10, 2008	The Eye	$973,078	
6	February 17, 2008	Jumper	$1,337,713	
7	February 24, 2008	Vantage Point	$413,424	
8	March 2, 2008	The Water Horse: Legend of the Deep	$885,740	
9	March 9, 2008	10,000 B.C.	$1,528,233	
10	March 16, 2008	10,000 B.C.	$1,116,016	
11	March 23, 2008	Supahpapalicious	$912,193	
12	March 30, 2008	10,000 B.C.	$691,776	
13	April 6, 2008	Shutter	$823,351	
14	April 13, 2008	Shutter	$652,307	
15	April 20, 2008	The Forbidden Kingdom	$1,289,628	
16	April 27, 2008	The Forbidden Kingdom	$711,635	
17	May 4, 2008	Iron Man †	$3,088,045	
18	May 11, 2008	Iron Man †	$1,918,521	
19	May 18, 2008	Iron Man †	$1,305,786	
20	May 25, 2008	Indiana Jones and the Kingdom of the Crystal Skull	$1,742,397	
21	June 1, 2008	Caregiver	$2,640,192	
22	June 8, 2008	The Chronicles of Narnia: Prince Caspian	$2,960,215	
23	June 15, 2008	The Incredible Hulk	$2,315,056	
24	June 22, 2008	The Incredible Hulk	$1,408,791	
25	June 29, 2008	Wanted	$1,439,403	
26	July 6, 2008	Hancock	$1,978,882	
27	July 13, 2008	Hancock	$1,407,725	
28	July 20, 2008	The Dark Knight	$1,983,664	^{[A]}
29	July 27, 2008	The Dark Knight	$1,298,749	
30	August 3, 2008	A Very Special Love	$2,961,147	^{[A]}
31	August 10, 2008	A Very Special Love	$1,954,255	^{[A]}
32	August 17, 2008	Dobol Trobol: Lets Get Redi 2 Rambol!	$2,391,365	^{[A]}
33	August 24, 2008	Dobol Trobol: Lets Get Redi 2 Rambol!	$1,373,983	^{[A]}
34	August 31, 2008	For the First Time	$2,262,621	^{[A]}
35	September 7, 2008	For the First Time	$1,011,933	^{[A]}
36	September 14, 2008	Hellboy II: The Golden Army	$735,826	
37	September 21, 2008	I.T.A.L.Y.	$869,386	^{[A]}
38	September 28, 2008	Eagle Eye	$757,734	^{[A]}
39	October 5, 2008	Mag-ingat Ka Sa... Kulam	$1,625,618	^{[A]}
40	October 12, 2008	Mag-ingat Ka Sa... Kulam	$888,506	^{[A]}
41	October 19, 2008	Max Payne	$915,081	^{[A]}
42	October 26, 2008	High School Musical 3: Senior Year	$1,346,769	^{[A]}
43	November 2, 2008	My Only Ü	$809,774	^{[A]}
44	November 9, 2008	Quantum of Solace	$1,095,305	^{[A]}
45	November 16, 2008	Madagascar: Escape 2 Africa	$457,743	^{[A]}
46	November 23, 2008	One True Love	$659,828	^{[A]}
47	November 30, 2008	Twilight	$1,694,933	^{[A]}
48	December 7, 2008	Twilight	$776,141	^{[A]}
49	December 14, 2008	The Day the Earth Stood Still	$511,737	^{[A]}
50	December 21, 2008	The Day the Earth Stood Still	$287,109	^{[A]}
51	December 28, 2008	Ang Tanging Ina N'yong Lahat	$2,343,455	^{[A]}

== Total Gross ==
#	Release Date	Film	Total Gross	Notes
1	April 30, 2008	Iron Man	$3,994,681	
2	July 30, 2008	A Very Special Love*	$3,836,701	
3	November 26, 2008	Twilight	$3,812,947	
4	July 17, 2008	The Dark Knight	$3,267,510	
5	May 28, 2008	Caregiver*	$3,108,225	
6	August 27, 2008	For The First Time*	$2,850,133	
7	July 31, 2008	The Mummy: Tomb of the Dragon Emperor	$2,757,657	
8	June 6, 2008	Kung Fu Panda	$2,560,515	
9	February 13, 2008	My Bestfriend's Girlfriend*	$2,426,782	
10	May 22, 2008	Indiana Jones and the Kingdom of the Crystal Skull	$2,425,404	

*Local Film
