= Dos Ekis =

2001 Filipino film

- Directed by: Erik Matti
- Screenplay by: Jay Abello; Joseph Casalda; Richard Somes
- Story by: Erik Matti
- Produced by: Vincent del Rosario III; Erik Matti
- Starring: Rica Peralejo; Mark Anthony Fernandez
- Cinematography: J.A. Tadena
- Edited by: Danny Gloria
- Music by: Lourd de Veyra
- Production company: Viva Films
- Distributed by: Viva Films
- Release date: October 24, 2001
- Running time: 115 minutes
- Country: Philippines
- Language: Filipino

Dos Ekis is a 2001 Philippine crime drama film co-written, co-produced and directed by Erik Matti. The film stars Rica Peralejo and Mark Anthony Fernandez. It is the second and final installment of the Ekis film series.

== Synopsis ==
Benito, a loner hardware clerk with no family and friends lives in a dilapidated cinema. Oftentimes, he visits Charisse, a nightclub dancer whom he falls in love with. The two escapes and goes into hiding after Charisse has stolen money from her crime boss.

== Cast ==
- Rica Peralejo as Charisse Cubarubias
- Mark Anthony Fernandez as Benito Quebrar
- Celso Ad. Castillo as Dodi Zarcon
- John Arcilla as Bunny
- Ricardo Cepeda as Insp. Dax Porras
- Raven Villanueva as Libay Sta. Maria
- Rina Reyes as Vivian Sales
- Kokoy Jimenez as Tansyong Jimenez
- Madeleine Nicolas as Old Chinese Hardware Owner
- Eddie Arenas as Charisse's Grandfather
- Alvin Bernales as Baldo Sta. Maria
- Army Arnaldo as Jovy
- Rose Gavela as Ate Lita
- Gigie Perato as Ayda
- Mely Soriano as Tansyon's Relative
- Erik Matti as Bar DJ
- Richard Somes as Bar Waiter
- A.J. Dela Cruz as Flower Girl
- Abby Francisco as Bar Girl
- Mike Sarrosa as Benito's Neighbor
- Charry Castinlag as Flower Shopkeeper
