= Rica Peralejo =

Filipino actress, singer and host (born 1981)

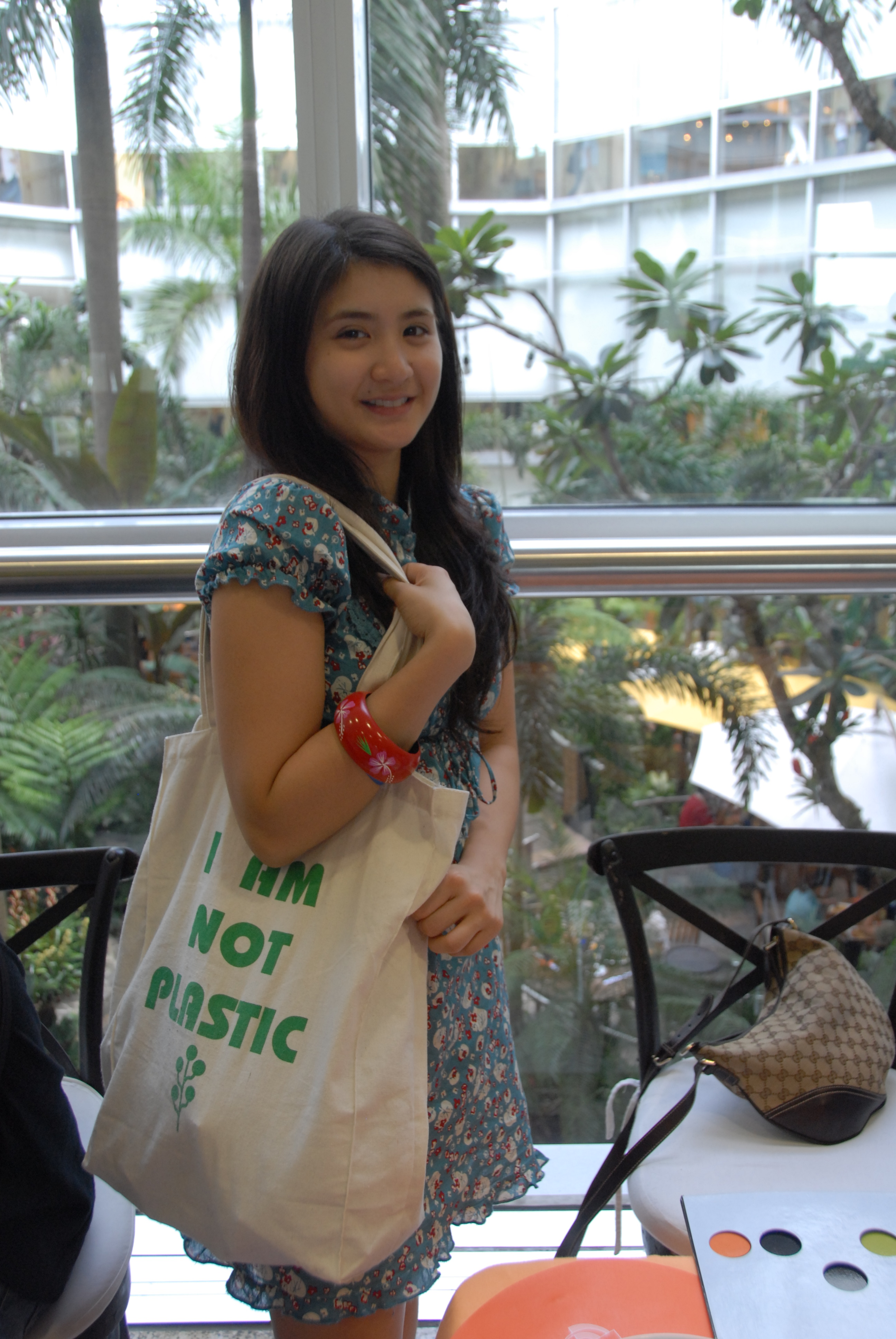
- Peralejo in 2007
- Born: Regina Carla Bautista Peralejo; March 7, 1981 (age 45); Quezon City, Metro Manila, Philippines
- Education: Ateneo de Manila University (AB)
- Occupations: Singer; actress; TV host
- Years active: 1993–present
- Spouse: Joseph Bonifacio (m. 2010)
- Children: 2
- Relatives: Paula Peralejo (sister); Heaven Peralejo (niece)

YouTube information
- Channel: Rica Peralejo-Bonifacio
- Years active: 2014–present
- Genre: Vlog
- Subscribers: 437,000
- Views: 28.9 million
- Last updated: August 4, 2026

Regina Carla "Rica" Bautista Peralejo-Bonifacio (Tagalog: [ˈɾika pɛɾaˈlɛho]; born March 7, 1981) is a Filipino actress, singer, and television host.

== Career ==
=== Television ===
Peralejo started out as a child star and was part of ABS-CBN's popular youth oriented variety show Ang TV. Peralejo appeared in Gimik. She was also cast as part of the hit horror series !Oka Tokat. Her acting prowess was finally recognized as she became a staple in ABS-CBN's teleseryes such as Mula sa Puso, Marinella, Kay Tagal Kang Hinintay, Sineserye Presents: Palimos ng Pag-ibig, Sa Piling Mo and Pangarap na Bituin. She was also part of the hit sitcoms Palibhasa Lalake, Oki Doki Doc and OK Fine Whatever. She also honed her hosting skills as a host for the showbiz oriented show Showbiz No. 1 and a segment host for Umagang Kay Ganda. She was also hailed as a Dancing Queen with her Rated R segment in the Philippines' longest running variety show ASAP.

Peralejo has appeared in several episodes of Komiks, Star Magic Presents, Philippine TV's longest running drama anthology Maalaala Mo Kaya and her own mini-anthology via Star Drama Presents: Rica. Recently, Rica has appeared in guest roles on 100 Days to Heaven and Ikaw ay Pag-Ibig and became a guest judge on several occasions on It's Showtime. In 2015, Peralejo hosted Mommy Hacks.

=== Film ===
Peralejo retired from acting sometime after 2013. However, she later returned to the craft after watching Gomburza in 2023, and starred in the 2025 film Manila's Finest.

=== Music ===
Peralejo also embarked on a singing career and released two solo albums.

== Personal life ==
Peralejo studied at the School of the Holy Spirit during her early years. She graduated from the Ateneo de Manila University with a Bachelor of Arts degree in literature.

Peralejo married Joseph "Joe" Bonifacio, a pastor of Every Nation Church, in January 2010. They have two sons together.

== Filmography ==
=== Film ===
Year	Title	Role	Notes	Source
1994	Eat All You Can			
1995	Bocaue Pagoda Tragedy	Cely		
1995	Pulis Patola 2			
1995	Habang May Buhay	Elma		
1996	Takot Ka Ba Sa Dilim?	Mariel		
1996	Ang TV: The Movie	Maneh		
1996	Where D' Girls R	Trinidad		
1997	T.G.I.S.: The Movie	Mitch Ferrer		
1998	Silaw	Kitten		
1998	It's Cool Bulol	Pinky		
1999	Mula sa Puso: The Movie	Trina		
2000	Pera O Bayong Not Da TV			
2000	Ex-Con	Kim		
2001	Balahibong Pusa	Becky		
2001	Sa Huling Paghihintay	Geri		
2001	Buhay Kamao	Vilma		
2001	Banyo Queen	Angeline		
2001	Dos Ekis	Charisse		
2001	Tatarin	Amanda		
2002	Hibla	Isabel		
2003	Malikmata	Sarah		
2004	Spirit of the Glass	Kelly		
2005	Hari Ng Sablay	Venus		
2005	Kutob	Erika		
2006	Matakot Ka Sa Karma	Mariel	Segment: "Aparador"	
2007	Tiyanaks	Sheila		
2008	Caregiver	Karen		
2010	Paano Na Kaya	Maan Chua		
2025	Manila’s Finest			

=== Television ===
Year	Title	Role	Notes	Source
1993	Ang TV	Herself — various roles		
1994	Maalaala Mo Kaya		Episode: "Bracelet"	
1994–1996	Palibhasa Lalake	Rica / Ashley		
1995	T.G.I.S.	Michelle “Mitch” Ferrer		
1996	Ipaglaban Mo: Sinugatang Dangal			
1996	Star Drama Theater: Claudine		Episode: At Nabakli ang Pakpak	
1996	Maalaala Mo Kaya		Episode: "Bahay na Bato"	
1996	Maalaala Mo Kaya		Episode: "Basketball"	
1997–1999	Gimik	Jersey Salveron		
1997	Growing Up	Michelle "Mitch" Ferrer		
1997 & 1998	Star Drama Theater Presents: Rica	Various Roles		
1997–2007	ASAP	Host — Herself		
1997-2000	!Oka Tokat	Rikki Montinola		
1997	Wansapanataym		Episode: "Patay-patayan, Buhay-buhayan"	
1998–1999	Mula sa Puso	Trina Alfonso-Miranda / Trina Gomez / Trina Enriquez		
1998	Maalaala Mo Kaya		Episode: "Bahay-Bahayan"	
1998	Oki Doki Doc	Rica		
1999	Maalaala Mo Kaya		Episode: "Saplot"	
1999	Wansapanataym		Episode: "Mahiwagang Lampara"	
1999–2000	Marinella	Jenny		
1999	Star Drama Theater: Bojo	Rachel	Episode: Triple R	
2000	H2K: Hati-Hating Kapatid	Gabriela		
2000	Maalaala Mo Kaya		Episode: "Rehas"	
2000	Wansapanataym		Episode: "Betty at Bestre"	
2002	Kay Tagal Kang Hinintay	Helaena Argos		
2003	Maalaala Mo Kaya		Episode: "Dreamhouse"	
2003	OK Fine Whatever	Ikay		
2004	Showbiz No. 1	Herself — Host		
2005	Wansapanataym	Fauna	Episode: "D' Supers"	
2006	Sa Piling Mo	Nicole Fuentebella		
2006	Komiks		Episode: "Vincent"	
2006	Komiks		Episodes: "Bampy (Part 1)", "Bampy (Part 2)"	
2006	Star Magic Presents	Sandy	Episode: "Love Chop"	
2006	Maalaala Mo Kaya		Episode: "Casa"	
2006	Maalaala Mo Kaya	Sophia	Episode: "Love Letters"	
2007	Maalaala Mo Kaya	Aprik	Episode: "Jacket"	
2007	Sineserye Presents: Palimos ng Pag-ibig	Fina Alcaraz		
2007–2011	Umagang Kay Ganda	Herself — Host		
2007	Pangarap na Bituin	Bridgette Ramirez		
2011	100 Days to Heaven	Rachelle Bustamante		
2011	Maalaala Mo Kaya	Eva	Episode: "Tulay"	
2011	Ikaw ay Pag-Ibig	Rosario		
2012	Maalaala Mo Kaya	Abby	Episode: "Cross-stitch"	
2012	Teen Gen	Czarina		
2013	Maalaala Mo Kaya	Minda	Episode: "Drawing"	
2015	Mommy Hacks	Herself — Host		
2025	What Lies Beneath			
2026	Paskong Pinoy		Episode: "The Last New Year in Boracay"	

== Discography ==
=== Albums ===
Year	Album	Label
1995	Fallin'	Alpha Records
1999	Ikaw Pa Rin at Ako	Viva Records
2001	Sa Huling Paghihintay (soundtrack)	Viva Records
2006	Bollywood Fever (EP)	Galaxy Records

== Awards and nominations ==
Year	Award giving body	Category	Nominated work	Results
2002	20th FAP Awards	Best Supporting Actress	"Tatarin"	Won
2003	17th PMPC Star Awards for TV	Best Drama Actress	Kay Tagal Kang Hinintay	Nominated
2003	21st FAP Awards	Best Actress	"Hibla"	Won
2004	18th PMPC Star Awards for TV	Best Reality Competition Host (shared with Marvin Agustin and Juddha Paolo)	"To the Max!"	Nominated
2004	30th Metro Manila Film Festival	Best Actress	"Spirit of the Glass"	Nominated
2005	31st Metro Manila Film Festival	Best Actress	Kutob	Nominated
2006	54th FAMAS Awards	Best Actress	Kutob	Nominated
2007	2nd Myx Music Awards	Favorite Guest Appearance in a Music Video	"Martyr Nyebera"(song by Kamikazee)	Nominated
2008	22nd PMPC Star Awards for TV	Best Morning Show Host (shared with Umagang Kay Ganda hosts)	Umagang Kay Ganda	Nominated
2009	23rd PMPC Star Awards for TV	Best Morning Show Host (shared with Umagang Kay Ganda hosts)	Umagang Kay Ganda	Won
2009	25th PMPC Star Awards for Movies	Best Supporting Actress	Caregiver	Won
2010	24th PMPC Star Awards for TV	Best Morning Show Host (shared with Umagang Kay Ganda hosts)	Umagang Kay Ganda	Won
2010	1st Media Newser Philippines Awards	Best Morning Show Host (shared with Umagang Kay Ganda hosts)	Umagang Kay Ganda	Won
2010	8th Gawad Tanglaw Awards	Best Morning Show Host (shared with Umagang Kay Ganda hosts)	Umagang Kay Ganda	Won
2010	4th UPLB Gandingan Awards	Best Morning Show Host (shared with Umagang Kay Ganda hosts)	Umagang Kay Ganda	Won
2011	5th UPLB Gandingan Awards	Best Morning Show Host (shared with Umagang Kay Ganda hosts)	Umagang Kay Ganda	Won
2011	25th PMPC Star Awards for TV	Best Morning Show Host (shared with Umagang Kay Ganda hosts)	Umagang Kay Ganda	Won
