= Halina Perez =

Filipina actress

- Born: Vanessa May-Anne D. Uri; December 11, 1981; Santa Maria, Laguna, Philippines
- Died: March 4, 2004 (aged 22); Del Gallego, Camarines Sur, Philippines
- Resting place: Santa Maria Catholic Cemetery, Santa Maria, Laguna
- Occupation: Actress
- Years active: 2000–2004

Vanessa May-Anne D. Uri, also known as Halina Perez (December 11, 1981 – March 4, 2004), was a Filipino actress.

== Life and career ==
Perez was born Vanessa May-Anne Uri. When she was four, her father was imprisoned twice which led to her parents' separation. Her father reportedly burnt their house when he was on drugs. She graduated from the Sta. Maria Academy School in Santa Maria, Laguna. Perez appeared in erotic thrillers and comedies. Notable credits include Kiskisan (2003), Kasiping (along with Diana Zubiri) (2002), Balat Sibuyas (2002), Amorseko: Damong Ligaw (2001) and Ikapitong Gloria (2001).

== Death ==
On March 4, 2004, Perez attended the opening of a Konica photo store in Legazpi, Albay. On their way back to Manila, their van collided with a truck head-on at the Quezon–Camarines Norte boundary. Perez' manager, Isah Munio, died at the scene, while the van driver died after undergoing surgery. Perez broke her neck in the crash but was still breathing and saying “Ouch, oh, Ouch” when rescuers pulled her out of the wreck. She was dead by the time she arrived at the Tagkawayan District Hospital in Tagkawayan, Quezon. The remaining four victims survived. Perez was buried at the Santa Maria Catholic Cemetery in her hometown Santa Maria, Laguna.

== Filmography ==
=== Movies ===
Year	Title	Role
2000	Alipin ng Tukso	Liza
2001	Ika-Pitong Gloria	
2002	Hinog sa Pilit: Sobra sa Tamis	Diana
2002	Biglang Liko	Lerma
2002	Alyas Bomba Queen	Vangie
2002	Tukaan	Joanne
2002	Dalaginding	
2002	Sex Files	Nelia
2002	Kasiping	Gilda
2003	Kiskisan	Gemma
2003	Balat-Sibuyas	Diana
2003	Asboobs: Asal Bobo	Capt. Barba's girlfriend
2004	Kirot sa Dibdib	Serena Luna

=== Television series ===
Year	Title	Role
2003	Maalaala Mo Kaya: Tsubibo	Pepsi Paloma
