= Parehas ang Laban =

Philippine action film

- Directed by: William Mayo
- Screenplay by: Wilmer Cruz; J. Erastheo Navoa
- Story by: William Mayo
- Produced by: Wilson Tieng
- Starring: Ian Veneracion; John Regala
- Cinematography: Vic Anao
- Edited by: Ruben Pantua
- Music by: Blitz Padua
- Production company: Solar Films
- Distributed by: Solar Films
- Release date: September 5, 2001
- Running time: 102 minutes
- Country: Philippines
- Language: Filipino

Parehas ang Laban is a 2001 Philippine action film written and directed by William Mayo. The film stars Ian Veneracion and John Regala.

The film is streaming online on YouTube.

== Cast ==
- Ian Veneracion as Insp.David Valdez
- John Regala as Brix Vergado
  - Dave Payot as Young Brix
- Angela Velez as Sr./Insp. Emma Garcia
- Daisy Reyes as Mildred
- Brando Legaspi as SPO1. Gomez
- John Apacible as PO2. Zamora
- Alex Bolado as PO2. Burgos
- Robert Rivera as Sr./Supt. Lopez
- Nognog Nognog as Benjo
- Kenneth Ramos as Sonny
- Zandro Zamora as Brando
- Conrad Poe as Barca
- Robert Talby as Cortez
- Benny Cheng as Benny
- Lito Marcos as Lope
- Ralph Jervis as Fat Policeman
- Elaine Dizon as Call Girl
- Alex David as Brix's Father
