= UNICEF Philippines =

Country office of the United Nations Children's Fund

- Abbreviation: UNICEF Philippines
- Formation: 1948
- Type: Country office
- Legal status: Active
- Headquarters: 14th Floor Rockwell Business Center Sheridan Street corner United Street, Mandaluyong, Metro Manila, Philippines
- Head: Oyunsaikhan Dendevnorov (Country Representative)
- Parent organization: UNICEF
- Website: www.unicef.ph

UNICEF Philippines is one of Philippine's offices of the United Nations Children’s Fund (UNICEF). Being one of the first UNICEF offices established in Asia, it works to uphold the rights of children in the Philippines, including their right to education, healthcare, protection from abuse and exploitation. Additionally, it advocates for political change in support of children, and works with partners from public and private sectors to create change through sustainable programs.

UNICEF itself was created in 1946 to provide food, clothing, and healthcare to children in Europe after World War II. In 1953, the UN General Assembly extended UNICEF’s mandate. In 1989 it adopted the UN Convention on the Rights of the Child (CRC), which has since become the most widely adopted human rights treaty in history. The CRC now underpins UNICEF’s work around the world, including in the Philippines, and defines children’s rights.

== Programs ==
=== Child protection ===
UNICEF works to provide a safe and protective environment for vulnerable children, including victims of abuse, exploitation and violence. Through their work at both the local and national level, UNICEF attempts to develop and strengthen child protection networks. The organization also supports the establishment of Child Protection Units and specialized courts to help victims of child exploitation and abuse. In the Philippines, UNICEF has successfully lobbied for the passage of several major laws to protect children’s rights, including the Juvenile Justice and Welfare Act and the Anti-Child Pornography Act of 2009.

=== Disaster risk reduction ===
UNICEF Philippines focuses on disaster risk reduction (DRR), striving to establish child-centered disaster risk management models. These models serve as blueprints for local government units (LGUs) to integrate DRR into their development plans. In addition to bridging community-based activities with public policy, UNICEF facilitates partnerships between non-government organizations and LGUs. Together, they develop child-sensitive DRR and climate change adaptation plans and programs, aiming to ensure the safety and well-being of children during emergencies.

=== Education ===
UNICEF works to achieve quality and inclusive education for all children in the Philippines; hence they support the Philippine Government’s thrust to expand access to quality Early Childhood Care and Development (ECCD), which includes universal child care. UNICEF's education program aims to provide an equitable platform for learning to ensure that young children are ready to learn and enter school at the right age, and that marginalized and excluded children participate in and complete quality elementary education.

=== Health and nutrition ===
UNICEF's health program supports the Philippine Government’s Universal Health Care Agenda and poverty reduction initiatives to serve the poorest families and most vulnerable groups, particularly women and their newborn babies and beneficiaries of the conditional cash transfer program. In line with UNICEF’s equity focus on regions identified by the government as the most disadvantaged, the organization's programs are being implemented in areas that have the lowest number and coverage of health facilities and skilled birth attendants, while supporting the institutionalization of standards to improve the quality of healthcare services for mothers and children at the national level.

UNICEF's nutrition program aims to improve child survival, growth and development through life-cycle nutrition security interventions. UNICEF's nutrition programs in the Philippines include: increasing access among pregnant and lactating women and children under 5 years old to interventions that prevent under-nutrition and micro-nutrient deficiencies; treatment of acute malnutrition; sustaining positive nutrition behavior in vulnerable local government units; and supports the government in promoting breastfeeding and Infant and Young Child Feeding practices.

=== HIV and AIDS ===
UNICEF is supporting the Philippine government's HIV response by gathering data and strategic information, advocating for laws that are responsive to the needs of children and young people, providing life skills and leadership training to adolescents, and helping the government, NGOs, and youth networks improve service delivery to respond to the crisis.

=== Social policy ===
UNICEF provides technical assistance to the Philippine government in expanding social protection programs that help children and families who do not receive basic social services, such as street families, indigenous people, and migrant families.

=== Water, sanitation and hygiene (WASH) ===
UNICEF aims to achieve universal use and access to sustainable and resilient basic sanitation and safe water with improved hygiene behavior in disadvantaged households, schools, and Early Childhood Care and Development centers in the Philippines. The organization's WASH program focuses on the poorest villages with the lowest WASH coverage, and scaling up interventions to support government programs that address WASH issues at the national level.

== Emergency response ==
UNICEF can respond rapidly to a natural disaster or humanitarian emergency upon the request of the Philippine government. UNICEF's emergency response programs provide support to the government-led response in the areas of child protection, education, health, nutrition, and WASH. Recently, UNICEF assisted those affected by the Marawi crisis, Typhoon Nock-Ten, Typhoon Haima, Typhoon Melor, Typhoon Koppu, Typhoon Hagupit, Typhoon Haiyan and the Zamboanga City crisis.

== Celebrity ambassadors ==
UNICEF Philippines has appointed two National Goodwill Ambassadors: Gary Valenciano and Anne Curtis. Their contracts were reviewed in 2023.

In 1998, Gary Valenciano was conferred the honor of the first UNICEF National Ambassador in the Philippines. As a National Ambassador, he helps increase awareness about the issues that affect children in the Philippines and their rights to education, health, protection, participation, and assistance during emergencies.

Actress, television host, and recording artist, Anne Curtis, was appointed UNICEF Celebrity Advocate for Children in 2015 and later as a National Ambassador in 2019. Her work for UNICEF focuses on promoting Early Childhood Care & Development.
