= Hayden Kho =

Filipino aesthetic medicine doctor and media personality

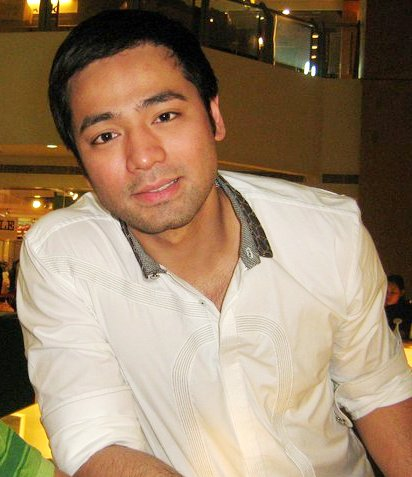
- Born: Hayden dela Santa Kho Jr. May 20, 1980 (age 46); Manila, Philippines
- Other name: Doc H
- Education: University of Santo Tomas (B.S. and M.D.)
- Occupations: Aesthetic medicine physician; media personality; entrepreneur; model
- Height: 1.91 m (6 ft 3 in)
- Spouse: Vicki Belo (m. 2017)
- Children: 1

Hayden dela Santa Kho Jr. (born May 20, 1980) is a Filipino aesthetic dermatologist, media personality, and entrepreneur. He is the chairman of the board and medical innovation advisor of Belo Medical Group.

== Early life and education ==
Hayden dela Santa Kho Jr. was born on May 20, 1980 in the Philippines to parents Hayden Kho Sr., a Chinese doctor, and Irene dela Santa, a Spanish-Filipina businesswoman.

He spent his early years at Grace Christian High School (now Grace Christian College) in Quezon City. Kho studied at the University of Santo Tomas, earning a bachelor's degree in medical technology in 2001 and a medical degree in 2005. He completed his internship at the Makati Medical Center, where he also served as president of the interns' association. He received his medical license in 2007.

=== Modeling and Television career ===
Kho began his modeling career at 16, appearing in runway shows locally and internationally, including in the United States, Singapore, South Korea, and Japan. In 2007, he began his career on television in the Philippines as an actor, appearing on Celebrity Duets, and taking on supporting roles for GMA Network.

Kho was the focus of public controversy in 2009, involving his alleged participation in a sex scandal that garnered widespread national attention. As a result, criminal and civil cases were filed against him by Filipina actress Katrina Halili, with whom he had partnered on Celebrity Duets. He ultimately faced the Senate for a public trial. As a result of the case, he was stripped of his medical license in 2011 but it was ultimately reinstated in 2014.

=== Medical career ===
Kho was trained in cosmetic medicine at the Belo Medical Group. He also continued on to pursue training in anti-aging medicine through the European Anti-Aging Medicine Society.

=== Entrepreneurship ===
Kho oversaw the distribution of ZO Skin Health cosmeceuticals in the Philippines and introduced "Hayden Fragrances", his own perfume brand.

Kho serves as both Managing Director for Belo Medical Group and President of Venn Intelligent Aesthetics. He established Venn Intelligent Aesthetics in 2017, a venture focusing on marketing and distributing cosmetic medicine, surgical instruments, cosmeceuticals, injectables, and associated devices.

In 2021, Kho made an investment in the Swiss-based watch brand, Vanguart.

Kho is a board member for the non-profit Right Start Foundation.

== Spiritual and personal life ==
Kho restored his Christian faith in May 2013. Kho met Christian apologist Ravi Zacharias at an event hosted by the Christ's Commission Fellowship (CCF) in Manila. He later became an active member of Christ's Commission Fellowship. Kho attended the Oxford Centre for Christian Apologetics to study Christian apologetics, where he was tutored by Os Guinness, John Lennox, Alister McGrath, and Jay Smith.

In September 2017, Kho married with Vicki Belo in Paris. In 2018, he continued his studies in Christian apologetics.

== Filmography ==
=== Television ===
| Year | Title | Role | Notes |
|---|---|---|---|
| 2015 | Healing Galing! | Himself | Host |
| 2012 | Sarah G. Live | Himself | Guest |
| 2011 | Gandang Gabi, Vice! | Himself | Guest |
| 2011 | Paparazzi | Himself | Host |
| 2009 | Darna | Danny | Cameo |
| 2008 | Yang Sisters | Jonathan | |
| 2008 | Luna Mystika | Jonas | |
| 2008 | Ako si Kim Sam Soon | Dr. Henry | Lead Role |
| 2007 | Marimar | Dr. Hayden Miranda | Supporting Role |
| 2007 | Celebrity Duets: Philippine Edition | Himself | Contender/Performer |

=== Film ===
| Year | Title | Role | Release date |
|---|---|---|---|
| 2016 | EDSA | | June 30, 2016 |
| 2015 | Homeless | Diego | August 15, 2015 |
| 2013 | The Bride and the Lover | Bruno | May 1, 2013 |
