= Tessa Prieto-Valdes =

Filipino columnist and media personality

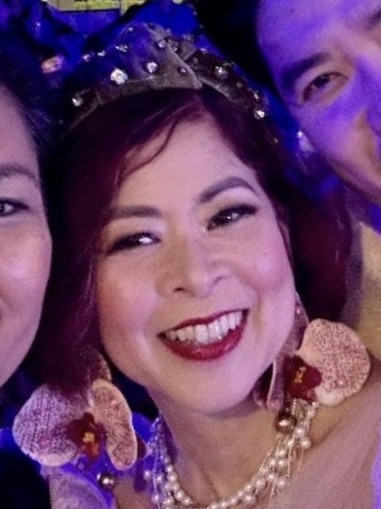
- Prieto-Valdes in 2023
- Born: Maria Theresa Isabel Rufino Prieto; September 1963 (age 62–63)
- Other names: Sea Princess; Tessa Prieto; Tessa Prieto Valdez; Tessa Valdes
- Occupations: Columnist; interior designer; philanthropist; media personality
- Years active: 1989–present
- Known for: Her flamboyant, maximalist fashion
- Spouse: Dennis Valdes (m. 1993; ann. 2025)
- Children: 4
- Family: Rufino family

Maria Theresa Isabel "Tessa" Rufino Prieto-Valdes (born September 1963) is a Filipino interior designer, socialite, columnist, and television personality known for her flamboyant personal style in fashion and for her philanthropic work. Prieto-Valdes writes lifestyle and society columns for the Philippine Daily Inquirer and has co-founded the Red Charity Gala, an annual charity fashion gala in Manila. She has also appeared as a media personality on reality television and in films.

== Early life ==
Prieto-Valdes is the eldest daughter of Marixi Rufino-Prieto, a businesswoman who chaired the Philippine Daily Inquirer and a member of the prominent Rufino family, and Alejandro "Alex" Prieto, a businessman. She had an older brother, Louie, who died in a motorcycle accident along South Luzon Expressway in 1994. Her sister, Alexandra "Sandy" Prieto-Romualdez, is the president and CEO of the Inquirer Group of Companies, while her brother Paolo is the president of Inquirer.net, the newspaper's website.

Prieto-Valdes completed high school at Assumption College in Makati in 1981 and initially studied architecture at the University of Santo Tomas in Manila for two years, but she dropped out after becoming pregnant with her eldest child, Bryan, at age 19. Raising Bryan as a single mother, her parents sent her to live abroad. She then pursued interior design, earning a Bachelor of Arts degree in Interior Design from the College of Notre Dame in the United States. After finishing her studies abroad, Prieto-Valdes returned to the Philippines and took the professional licensure exam for interior designers, achieving the top score in 1995.

The Rufino-Prieto family was listed by Forbes as one of the Philippines' richest—ranked 39th in 2007 and 40th in 2008—with an estimated family fortune of more than US$30 million.

== Career ==
=== Interior design and writing ===
Prieto-Valdes has been a practicing interior designer since at least 1989—fellow designer Tessa Alindogan recalls that Prieto-Valdes was her first business partner in an interior design venture that year. Prieto-Valdes later established her own design firm known as the Trezza Group or "Tessa Group", which has handled both residential and commercial projects. Notable works include the interiors of Hotel Elizabeth in Baguio and Cebu, as well as the office of the Philippine Daily Inquirer. With over two decades in the field, she is recognized for an eclectic design aesthetic that blends colors, patterns, and themes, much like her personal fashion style.

Since 2003, Prieto-Valdes has been a columnist for the Philippine Daily Inquirer, writing on lifestyle and society topics. She contributes a society column (often covering events and personalities) and a weekly real estate/home interiors column titled "My Square Meter". Her columns chronicle the people, places, and events of Manila's high society, and she often draws from her own experiences in the social scene. Her Sunday column, simply titled "Tessa!", is a personal chronicle—part social diary, travelogue, and family journal. By the mid-2000s, she was contributing two weekly columns (society features and a realty column) in the Inquirer. In 2013, the Inquirer published a compilation of her first ten years of columns.

=== Television, film, and other media ===
In 2007, Prieto-Valdes joined the GMA Network's reality singing competition Celebrity Duets: Philippine Edition, where well-known personalities performed with professional singers. Among the singers she performed with were Kyla, Jolina Magdangal, Billy Crawford, Kitchie Nadal, Manilyn Reynes, Rufa Mae Quinto, Arnell Ignacio, Michael V., Joey G. of Side A, Mike Hanopol, and Aia de Leon of Imago. On October 20, Prieto-Valdes won the show's first season. In subsequent seasons of Celebrity Duets, she returned as a judge.

In October 2009, she was featured as a guest judge on an episode of the second season of Project Runway Philippines, where the design contestants were challenged to create wearable outfits inspired by her famously eccentric style.

Prieto-Valdes made a cameo on the regional reality competition show The Amazing Race Asia, which aired on AXN. During the show's fourth season (2010), a leg set in the Philippines featured her as the local "pit stop greeter", welcoming contestants at the finish mat in Bacacay, Albay, while standing beside the show's host, Allan Wu—she appeared in a vibrantly colored abacá-fabric outfit reflecting the local culture.

In 2012, Prieto-Valdes co-hosted Extreme Makeover: Home Edition Philippines on TV5 as the show's interior design expert, alongside Paolo Bediones as the team leader.

She has guested on several talk shows, including The Ryzza Mae Show (2014), The Lolas' Beautiful Show (2017), and Sarap, 'Di Ba? (2019).

One of Prieto-Valdes's major television stints was as host of Philippine Realty TV, a real estate and home design program on the ABS-CBN News Channel (ANC). She first joined this show in 2015, announcing that she was "the new host of Philippine Realty TV, a show on real estate" airing Sunday nights. The program involved property tours with interior design features—an area well within her expertise. Prieto-Valdes's tenure on Philippine Realty TV spanned multiple seasons; she remained its host through the late 2010s. As of 2020, media profiles still noted that she "hosts Philippine Realty TV" as one of her ongoing roles.

In 2023, she was invited as a guest judge on the second season of Drag Race Philippines. During episode 3 of that season, she joined the judging panel evaluating contestants' high-fashion looks. Her participation attracted attention when she bluntly described one contestant's Halloween-themed outfit as "trash", echoing a controversial critique from a previous season. The remark drew some backlash from viewers and former contestants on social media, although Prieto-Valdes defended her judgment as part of the show's entertainment.

She led a team (dubbed "Team Sea Princess") as a celebrity contestant on the GMA Network game show Family Feud in 2024, marking her return to the game show after a 15-year gap.

Apart from television, Prieto-Valdes has appeared in a few Filipino films, usually in cameo roles where she plays herself or a variation of her public persona. She had a cameo in the comedy film Temptation Island (2011), portraying a beauty pageant host (essentially as herself) in an extravagant pageant scene. She also appeared briefly in the teen comedy Tween Academy: Class of 2012 (2011) as a character known as the aunt of "Popular Gal" Chloe (played by Lexi Fernandez), and in the comedy horror film Coming Soon (2013). These film cameos typically capitalized on her status as a fashion icon; she would often be seen in her trademark flamboyant attire on screen.

== Philanthropy ==
In 2009, Prieto-Valdes co-founded the Red Charity Gala together with Kaye Chua-Tinga, the wife of former Taguig mayor Freddie Tinga who later became the president of the Cultural Center of the Philippines. The Red Charity Gala is an annual fundraising event in Metro Manila that combines a high-profile fashion show with charity auctions. The gala showcases the works of prominent Filipino fashion designers and raises money for various causes. Over the years, it has featured celebrated designers such as Dennis Lustico, Michael Cinco, Rajo Laurel, Cary Santiago, and others, each headlining the gala to present their collections for a cause. The proceeds from Red Charity Gala events are donated to humanitarian and community charities—beneficiaries have included the Philippine Red Cross, the Assumption HS '81 Foundation (Prieto-Valdes's high school alumnae charitable group), and organizations supporting livelihood projects and disaster relief.

As the gala's co-chair, she helps oversee sponsorships, the creative themes, and the selection of designers. In the aftermath of Typhoon Haiyan (Yolanda) in 2013, funds from the gala and her foundation were used to build homes for affected families in Samar. In interviews, she has credited her mother, Marixi Rufino-Prieto, for instilling in her the duty to "share your blessings" and to maintain "charity in our blood".

Prieto-Valdes is active with her high school's alumnae foundation, which provides scholarships to underprivileged youth. She regularly attends graduations of scholars and personally supports students through school, often noting that education is one of the most effective ways to improve lives. She also lends her time to various benefit events, from art auctions to charity balls, frequently as a host or speaker. Her reputation as a philanthropist earned her the description of having a "heart of gold" by fellow socialites.

In addition to traditional charity, Prieto-Valdes has found creative ways to merge her lifestyle interests with fundraising. She has organized marathon runs and sports activities with friends to support causes (she herself is an avid runner and triathlete), and even her lavish parties sometimes double as charity events. The annual thematic parties she throws—often coinciding with her birthday or anniversaries—have been used to gather donations for charity instead of personal gifts.

== Fashion and public image ==
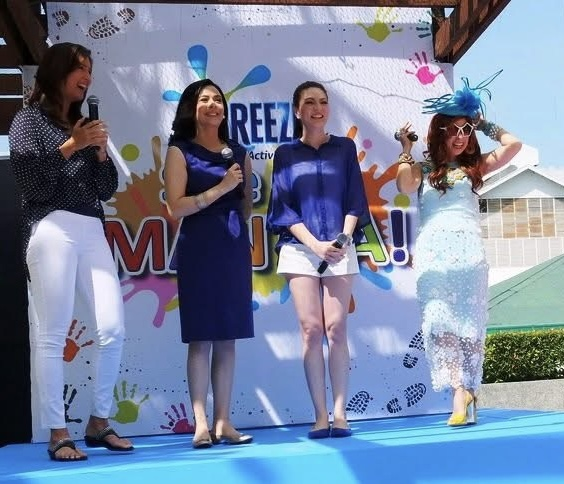
Prieto-Valdes (right) with Senator Pia Cayetano and actresses Dawn Zulueta and Carmina Villarroel at a media launch for Breeze at the Manila Polo Club, 2013.

Prieto-Valdes has often been described as a "fashion icon" in the Philippines for her outré outfits – lavish gowns, vibrant color schemes, layered patterns, and whimsical thematic accessories, especially her elaborate hats and headpieces. She has stated that she dresses to express joy and individuality, not to blend in. Early in her adulthood, however, her style was far more subdued: when she was coping with her older brother's death in the mid-1990s, she wore mostly black and neutral tones. Prieto-Valdes later credited a shift in her outlook on life—a decision to "live it up" after her brother's death and other challenges—for inspiring her signature colorful look. Since then, her extravagant fashion has become her personal brand. In 2002, she was featured on the cover of Tatler Philippines dressed as a Christmas tree, complete with ornaments, exemplifying her playful approach to haute couture.

Prieto-Valdes supports the Philippine fashion industry. In interviews, she notes that she frequently collaborates with Filipino designers for her outfits and that she showcases local design talent in the events she hosts or attends. As a columnist and society figure, she has used her platform to promote designers and advocate for creativity and confidence in fashion, encouraging others to dress for themselves without fear.

Media outlets have regarded Prieto-Valdes as one of the Philippines' notable socialites, coming from a prominent family and maintaining a visible presence in Manila's elite social circles. GMA Integrated News, Philippine Entertainment Portal, and Tatler Asia have noted that her maximalist fashion style has made her the "life of the party" at Manila's social gatherings. She and her ex-husband, Dennis Valdes, were known to celebrate milestone anniversaries in grand fashion – for instance, in 2014, they renewed their vows on their 20th anniversary with a lavish Game of Thrones-themed party, complete with costumes and decorations inspired by the television series. Despite her status among the country's elite, Prieto-Valdes has cultivated a relatable public persona; media have nicknamed her "Ms. Sunshine" of Manila high society for her positive energy and approachable, witty demeanor.

She has earned the moniker "Sea Princess" because of her affinity for diving and marine life. "Sea Princess" was the title of her Philippine Daily Inquirer lifestyle column, and the name stuck as her public nickname over the years. Her Instagram handle is @seaprincess888, referencing the nickname. Friends and media alike use the nickname as shorthand for her colorful, mermaid-esque fashion style. Philippine publications routinely mention "Tessa, a.k.a. the Sea Princess". Prieto-Valdes, for her part, lives up to the title with ocean-themed elements in her wardrobe.

== Personal life ==
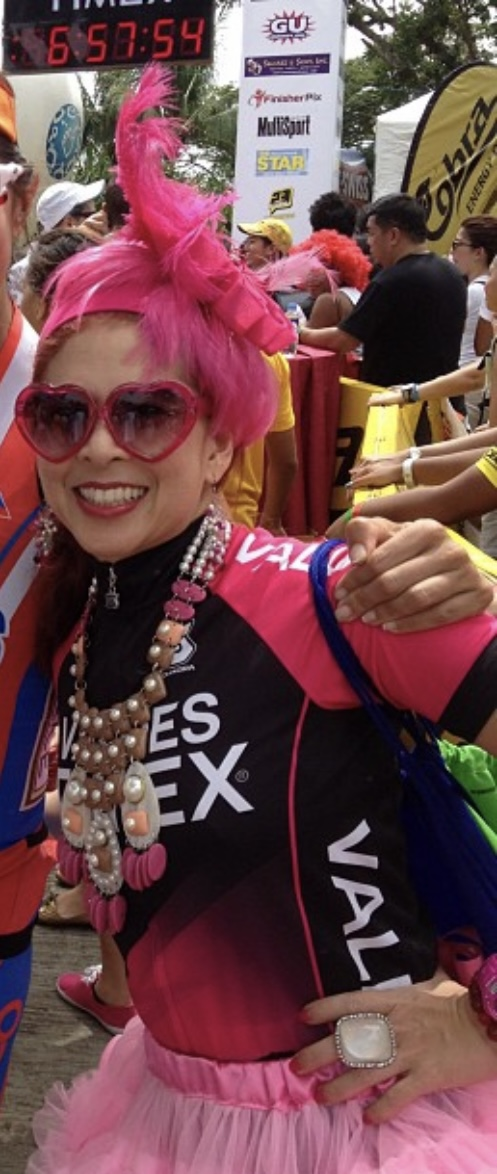
Prieto-Valdes at the Ironman 70.3 finish line in 2012.

Prieto-Valdes was married to businessman Dennis Valdes from 1994 to 2025. The Philippine Entertainment Portal (PEP) reports that the two had first met in 1993 on a scuba diving trip in Anilao, Batangas, but the Philippine Daily Inquirer, quoting Prieto-Valdes, says that they met in Palau. Their story was dramatized on the GMA Network romance anthology series Wagas on June 27, 2015, where Tessa and Dennis were played by Jackie Rice and TJ Trinidad, respectively. Tessa and Dennis had three children together: son Tyrone and daughters Jordan and Athena. Prieto-Valdes became a grandmother in 2021 when her eldest child Bryan and his wife had a child, and now has two grandchildren.

In 2020, Prieto-Valdes confirmed that she and her husband had separated after 26 years of marriage. In a 2022 interview with PEP, when asked about the separation, she said that she "felt betrayed" but did not elaborate on specific reasons for the breakup. She publicly maintained amicable words for Dennis, emphasizing that he is the father of her children and that she "[doesn't] want to bash" him despite what happened. In January 2025, Prieto-Valdes announced that the annulment of her marriage to Valdes had been finalized by the court, officially "stamped and sealed" at the start of that year. Following the annulment, Prieto-Valdes dropped "Valdes" from her surname in some of her social media accounts and began using just "Tessa Prieto" professionally, although in the press, her hyphenated name often remains. In interviews, she hinted at dating again and focusing on self-growth.

Prieto-Valdes is a certified scuba diver. She is also an avid marathon runner and triathlete, having completed the New York City and Paris marathons, often joking that she cares less about her finish time than about taking the most photos in her flamboyant running outfits. Other hobbies of hers include golf, yoga, and pole-dancing.

In interviews, Prieto-Valdes has described herself as a "maximalist" who approaches all aspects of life with full intensity and passion. A Catholic, she has mentioned being prayerful and even exploring practices like feng shui and meditation. She co-owns an online store of feng shui ornaments called Frigga Home. In 2018, Prieto-Valdes met the Dalai Lama, which she recounted as a profound experience—though, characteristically, she quipped that right after feeling enlightened by his words on karma, she "went shopping" because she remains a self-confessed lover of material joys.

She maintains a residence in Forbes Park, Makati. She also has a house in Australia.

=== Legal issues ===
In July 2024, she filed a formal complaint against her former romantic partner, Angelika "Angel" Chua, accusing Chua of physically abusing her during their relationship. Prieto-Valdes and Chua had dated for about 11 months after the former's marriage ended, and according to Prieto-Valdes's affidavit, there were instances where arguments escalated to physical harm—including one severe incident in July 2023—and she stated that she feared for her safety. The complaint was filed under the Anti-Violence Against Women and Children Act (Republic Act [RA] No. 9262), which covers abuse in dating relationships as well as in marriages. The Makati prosecutor's office reviewed the evidence and, in late 2024, issued a resolution finding basis to charge Angel Chua with violation of RA 9262 (a criminal offense). However, before the case could proceed to arraignment, Chua filed a petition for review with the Department of Justice (DOJ), which temporarily suspended the court proceedings. This legal back-and-forth was reported in the press in early 2025, with Prieto-Valdes stating that she pursued the case "to protect [herself]" and to stand up against abuse. The situation also brought attention to the topic of domestic violence in same-sex relationships (as Prieto-Valdes and Chua's relationship was between two women) and whether the same legal protections apply—lawyers affirmed that RA 9262 does cover such cases since it refers to abuse against women in any intimate relationship. In February 2025, a Makati Regional Trial Court branch issued a gag order on the case, which Chua's lawyer says Prieto-Valdes had violated.

In October 2024, a businesswoman named Salud Bautista filed a complaint accusing multiple people—Prieto-Valdes included—of involvement in an alleged syndicated estafa (fraud) scheme. The complaint, filed with authorities, suggested that Bautista had been defrauded in an investment or business deal and that Prieto-Valdes, along with five other individuals, had some role in convincing investors. Prieto-Valdes denied any wrongdoing. In January 2025, she submitted a counter-affidavit and testified at the Makati prosecutor's office, asserting that she was "falsely accused" and had never solicited money from anyone for investment purposes. She told the media, "I have never gotten anybody else's money and told them to invest in this or that," maintaining that her only involvement was being linked via a former associate. One of the other respondents in the estafa case was her ex-partner, Angel Chua, and the fraudulent business transactions in question were allegedly related to Chua's dealings. Prieto-Valdes suggested that she was dragged into the case only because of her past relationship with Chua—essentially saying she was an "extra" or an incidental party named in the complaint—and vowed to clear her name of charges she insists are baseless. Prieto-Valdes enlisted Nilo Divina's law firm to represent her. As of early 2025, the syndicated estafa case was under preliminary investigation, with Prieto-Valdes and her co-respondents awaiting the prosecutor's determination of whether the complaint had merit to proceed. She expressed confidence in a just outcome, stressing that she had "zero track record" of involvement in any financial scams and that those who know her can attest that she is far more inclined to spend her own money (often lavishly) than to scheme to get others' funds.

== Filmography ==
=== Film ===
Year	Title	Role	Notes	Ref(s)
2011	Temptation Island	Pageant host	Cameo; credited as Tessa Prieto Valdes	
2011	Tween Academy: Class of 2012	Chloe's aunt	Cameo; credited as Tessa Prieto Valdez	
2013	Coming Soon	Herself	Cameo	

=== Television ===
Year	Title	Role	Notes	Ref(s)
2007–2009	Celebrity Duets: Philippine Edition	Herself	Contestant (season 1); judge (seasons 2–3)	
2008	Family Feud	Herself	Contestant (Prieto-Valdes Family)	
2009	House Life	Herself	Host	
2009	Project Runway Philippines	Herself	Guest judge (season 2, episode 8: "Taming Tessa")	
2010	The Amazing Race Asia	Herself	Pit stop greeter (season 4, episode 5: "I Think They're Spoiled And Not Hardworking")	
2012	Extreme Makeover: Home Edition Philippines	Herself	Co-host (makeover team's interior designer)	
2012	Wasak	Herself	Guest; credited as Tessa Prieto-Valdez	
2014	Esoterika: Maynila	Herself	Guest	
2014	The Ryzza Mae Show	Herself	Guest	
2015–2020	Philippine Realty TV	Herself	Host	
2017	The Lolas' Beautiful Show	Herself	Guest	
2019	Sarap, 'Di Ba?	Herself	Guest; credited as Tessa Prieto	
2023	Drag Race Philippines	Herself	Guest judge (season 2, episode 3: "Who Wore It Bettah?"); credited as Tessa Prieto	
2024	Family Feud	Herself	Contestant (Team Sea Princess); credited as Tessa Prieto	

== Awards and nominations ==
Prieto-Valdes has received recognition in both media and philanthropic fields. In 2009, she earned a nomination for Best Lifestyle Show Host at the 23rd PMPC Star Awards for Television, cited for her work on the QTV lifestyle program House Life. In the charity and fashion arena, Lifestyle Asia magazine honored her as one of its "Agents of Change" in 2020 for her contributions to philanthropic causes. The following year, Tatler Asia included Prieto-Valdes in its 2021 list of "Asia's Most Influential" figures in the Philippines.

== See also ==
- Rufino family
