= Extreme Makeover: Home Edition Philippines =

- Genre: Reality television
- Written by: Desiree Agojo; Rozel Niño Cadiz; Frederick Castro; Xavier Gravides; Erika Margeaux Motril; Marizaly Quitania
- Directed by: Monti P. Parungao
- Presented by: Paolo Bediones; Tessa Prieto-Valdes; Divine Lee; Joby Belmonte; Tristan Jovellana; Marilen Montenegro
- Theme music composer: Emerzon Q. Texon
- Opening theme: "Bagong Bahay, Bagong Buhay" by Jett Pangan
- Composer: Emerzon Q. Texon
- Country of origin: Philippines
- Original language: Filipino
- No. of seasons: 1
- No. of episodes: 10 (list of episodes)

Production
- Executive producer: Xavier Gravides
- Editor: Ads Perez
- Running time: 60 minutes
- Production companies: Endemol, TV5

Original release
- Network: TV5
- Release: April 15 – June 17, 2012

Related
- Extreme Makeover: Home Edition

Extreme Makeover: Home Edition Philippines is a Philippine television reality competition show broadcast by TV5. The series is based on the American series Extreme Makeover: Home Edition. Hosted by Paolo Bediones, Tessa Prieto-Valdes, Divine Lee, Joby Belmonte, Tristan Jovellana and Marilen Faustino-Montenegro, it aired from April 15 to June 17, 2012, replacing Who Wants to Be a Millionaire? in Talentadong Pinoy's timeslot and was replaced by Who Wants to Be a Millionaire? in Talentadong Pinoy's timeslot.

The Philippine television network TV5 was the first in Asia to acquire the rights to produce its own version of the American reality series.

A special one week preview of the show, entitled Extreme Makeover: Home Edition Philippines The Road to Make Over began airing on April 9, 2012.

Road to the Makeover is always "Rated PG", However the main edition of the series is "Rated G". the difference that is depends on the episode. It aired every Sunday 8:30 PM (UTC+8). It differs from the American version, having a deadline of more than 7 days.

== Overview ==
Each episode features a family that has faced some sort of recent or ongoing hardship such as a natural disaster, has a bad house or a family member with a life-threatening illness, in need of new hope. The show's producers collaborate with a local construction contractor, which then collaborates with various companies in the building trades for a makeover of the family's home. This includes interior, exterior and landscaping, performed in several days while the family is on vacation (paid for by the show's producers) and documented in the episode. If the house is beyond repair, they replace it entirely. The show's producers and crew film set and perform the makeover but do not pay for it. The materials and labor are donated. Many skilled and unskilled volunteers assist in the rapid construction of the house.

== Extreme Makeover Team ==
Cast	Role
Paolo Bediones	Team Leader
Tessa Prieto-Valdes	Interior Designer
Divine Lee	Resident Project Manager
Joby Belmonte	Purchaser
Tristan Jovellana	Carpentry
Marilen Faustino-Montenegro	Stylist

== Episodes ==
No.	Title	Location	Original release date
1	"The Austria Family"	Mabalacat, Pampanga	April 15, 2012
The Mt. Pinatubo eruption of 1991 left Benjamin and Norma Austria with their ten children, homeless. They were given temporary housing at Clark Airbase Command (CABCOM) with nearly thirty-five thousand families affected by the explosion occurred. Because of contaminated water, Benjamin Aurora and four of their children became ill. Because of poverty, Norma Austria was forced to sell her house to finance medication for her husband and children. Unfortunately, they began to die one-by-one. After that event, they moved back home with four of her children and five grandchildren at the Madapdap Resettlement Area in Mabalacat, Pampanga. Norma Austria sweeps the roads in her street daily from 2:00 am to 4:00 pm on only a six thousand pesos per month salary. She is also a member of an organization that cares and provides protection to the young homeless. She helps bring the children with disabilities in hospitals and provides scholarship grants to eligible children in their community Builders: JAO Builders Design Team: Paolo, Tessa, Divine, Joby, Tristan, Marilen
2	"The Aure Family"	Alfonso, Cavite	April 22, 2012
Villa Aure's youngest daughter Joy is deaf-mute and has autism. For 24 years, Villa and her family has focused on taking care of Joy and in making her live a comfortable life. Having a special child wasn't easy for Villa, she decided to resign as a teacher in High School in 1995 and became a full time mom and teacher to Joy. At the same time, she helped out her friends, neighbors, and community by teaching special children at their home for free. The whole family devoted their time in teaching and serving the children. Along with them are two volunteer teachers who get a minimal compensation every month. Design Team: Paolo, Divine, Joby, Tristan, Marilen Builders: DateM Inc.
3	"The Rivera Family"	Bulacan	April 29, 2012
The Rivera family live in a respectable subdivision in Bulacan, however, the Rivera’s dilapidated home was considered the worst in the area. Poverty never stopped Rogelio from dreaming big. He was a scholar at Pamantasan ng Lungsod ng Valenzuela and graduated in 2011 with a degree in Bachelor of Science in Secondary Education Class. Despite his meager earnings as a teacher, Rogelio worked hard to fulfill his family’s dream of owning a good home. Design Team: Paolo, Tessa, Joby, Tristan, Marilen Builders: Robinsons Land Corporation
4	"The Cardines Family"	Naga, Cebu	May 6, 2012
Marites "Rina" Cardines was the first documented case of a Philippine domestic helper who was HIV positive. In 1997 in Dubai, the United Arab Emirates, Rina was infected by her boss, a father and was used as sex slave. With the help of the wife of the boss, she managed to escape. She planned to work abroad to support her son, two-year-old Shamein, but it never happened when she realized she was HIV positive. Rina began helping in the PAFPI (The Positive Action Foundation Philippines, Inc.), an organization that helps PLWHA (People Living with HIV / AIDS). She was given lodging, Anti Retro Viral drugs, peer health education and work trainings and met her future-husband, Gabby, a fellow Cebuano and PLWHA. The care of Rina's Gabby has resulted in their love affair. Soon the two were married and wished to start a new life in their province of Cebu. Gabby accepted Shamein (now 14, as of 2012) as his own son, and later, they bore another son, Chrishane who was born HIV negative. Design Team: Paolo, Tessa, Divine, Joby, Tristan Builders: Green Home
5	"The Zulueta-Beleno Family"	Marikina, Metro Manila	May 13, 2012
In 2009, a week after her birthday, Carmita Zulueta-Beleno, 35 years old, discovered that she had Stage 2 breast cancer. She did not lose hope, however, as it was not the first time her family faced cancer. Her mother had breast cancer 20 years ago and managed to survive. In September 28, 2009, Typhoon Ketsana attacked their residence in Marikina. During this time, Carmita had just begun radiation therapy. Her husband now works as an accountant to support the family. Their child now fears rain. Builders: Bostik Philippines
6	"The Labial Family"	Cagayan de Oro, Misamis Oriental	May 20, 2012
In 2011, typhoon Sendong flooded and ravaged Cagayan de Oro and the Labial Family's house got affected. Instead of getting a makeover of their house located in a high flood-risk barangay, the family was given a brand new house and lot at a subdivision in the uptown portion of the city. Builders: Camella Homes Design Team: Paolo, Tessa, Joby, Tristan, Marilen
7	"The Lapides Family"	Rodriguez, Rizal	May 27, 2012
Jomel Lapides lives with his younger sisters Cherrie and Cheryll, her mother, Milagros and her father, Julie in the town of Rodriguez, Rizal. Her father works as a tailor to support the family. After being an "Iskolar ng Bayan" (Scholar of the Town) he graduated, cum laude, in Nursing at the University of the Philippines. He also became Top 1 of the 2011 Nursing Board Exam of 78,135 Nursing graduates at the highest mark of 88.40 percent. When he gets his license, he wishes to work at the Philippine General Hospital. Designer: Arch. Justin Joseph R. Espejo Builders: DLR Construction
8	"The Bernandino Family"	Valenzuela, Metro Manila	June 3, 2012
Benjamin came from a poor family in Tondo. He graduated as a medical school scholar and achieved 7th place in the Medical Board Exam to become a full doctor and a teacher in college of medicine. Soon he married Rodora and had a daughter, Beatriz. In 1998, while Benjamin was withdrawing money at an ATM, he was shot in the neck that caused Spinal cord Injury C4. He stayed at the hospital for almost five years and is now a quadriplegic, having his entire body paralyzed from the neck down. He soon moved to Valenzuela and is now a wheelchair user. He helped build Haven Independent Life Center, a non-government organization where he served as Secretary General. The purpose of Life Haven Independent Center is to care for people with disabilities, provide opportunities and fight for their rights. Some of their assistance provided peer counseling, peer visit, personal assistance service, right-based advocacy, assistive devices, information and referrals. Builders: Bostik Philippines
9	"Gawad Kalinga Beneficiaries Part 1"	Dupax del Norte, Nueva Vizcaya	June 10, 2012
Kankanaey and Kalanguya are among 28 families who lost their home during the '60 for the construction of the Ambuklao and Binga Dams in Benguet. Most of them are living in dangerous areas, if not next to the creek, their homes are on land that easily crumble result of soil erosion. Gawad Kalinga will help the 28 family of Baranggay Macabenga. In addition to the construction of new and safe houses, Gawad Kalinga began a program of the following: child and youth development, community building, environment, food sufficiency, health, infrastructure and a social center for Innovation. Builders:
10	"Gawad Kalinga Beneficiaries Part 2"	Dupax del Norte, Nueva Vizcaya	June 17, 2012
Same as above Builders: Guest: Sharon Cuneta

== Awards and nominations ==
Year	Award	Category	Work	Result
2012	34th Catholic Mass Media Awards	Best Public Service	Cast and crew	Won

== See also ==
- List of programs broadcast by TV5
