= Niccolo Cosme =

Niccolo Cosme (born May 15, 1980, in Cavite, Philippines) is a conceptual photographer based in Manila, Philippines. His father is Caesar Colet Cosme, a television writer and director.

He was part of Celebrity Duets: Philippine Edition Season 3, an interactive reality based singing contest which was produced by Fremantle Media and Simon Cowell which also produced the original version in the United States. The Philippine edition was broadcast in GMA 7

== Advocacy ==
An outspoken LGBT activist he hosted the "I Am Not Immoral" photo exhibition to protest against the exclusion of the LGBT "Ang Ladlad" list from elections in 2010. Cosme is also an HIV/AIDS awareness advocate; he started The Red Whistle campaign in 2011 to raise awareness and understanding of HIV/AIDS in the Philippines.

== Awards and recognition ==
His interest in Christian iconography won him the international photographic competition by the Professional Photographers of America held in Korea in 2011.

In February 2012, Cosme received the Ani ng Dangal or "Harvest of Honors" together with 32 other Filipino artists from different fields by the National Commission for Culture and the Arts.

== Career ==
=== Project Headshot Clinic ===
In 2007, Cosme started "Project Headshot Clinic", a digital concept that merges profile photos used online with advertisement and/or advocacies. He sees profile photos as "online billboards" which caught the attention of some of the big brands in the Philippines and international entities such as the Joint United Nations Programme on HIV/AIDS (UNAIDS). In 2008, he took this project to other countries such as Vietnam, Cambodia and Macau. He also conceptualized and produced a series he called "COSME XXX" in 2010 as his personal tribute to "pain", one of his greatest inspirations. This series featured a number of images inspired by Christian Iconography such as the Madonna, the Crucifixion and the Pieta. In May 2011, he collaborated with the Department of Foreign Affairs (Philippines), FSI (Foreign Service Institute), ACHIEVE (Action for Health Initiatives, Inc.) and UNDP (United Nations Development Program) with his photo exhibit "Resplendor" (Blinding Light), a series depicting the different realities of HIV/AIDS in the Philippines.

=== Midnight Dream Studio ===
In October 2024, Cosme established Midnight Dream Studio, described by Metro.Style as “the biggest photoshoot studio in the country” and the “largest indoor studio in Metro Manila”. The 1,000-square-meter creative space, located on the 4th floor of On Top of the Glo, K-Park, Glorietta Mall in Makati, features over 40 dream-themed sets designed to support photography, film, and multimedia productions. The sets are designed to be “interchangeable and evolve with the latest trends”, though some signature spaces remain as permanent fixtures. It serves as a collaborative venue for artists, brands, and content creators, aiming to foster creativity, innovation, and community engagement within the local visual arts industry.

Cosme serves as the owner, creative director, photographer, and Chief Executive Officer of Midnight Dream Studio, handling the creative direction while working with business partners who manage the business side.
