= Celebrity Duets: Philippine Edition =

Philippine television reality show

- Season 3 title card
- Genre: Reality competition
- Based on: Celebrity Duets (2006) by Simon Cowell
- Presented by: Ogie Alcasid; Regine Velasquez
- Country of origin: Philippines
- Original language: Tagalog
- No. of seasons: 3

Production
- Executive producer: Wilma Galvante
- Camera setup: Multiple-camera setup
- Running time: 60 minutes
- Production company: GMA Entertainment TV

Original release
- Network: GMA Network
- Release: August 11, 2007 – November 14, 2009

Celebrity Duets: Philippine Edition is a Philippine television reality competition show broadcast by GMA Network. Hosted by Ogie Alcasid and Regine Velasquez, it premiered on August 11, 2007. The show concluded on November 14, 2009.

== Cast ==
Hosts

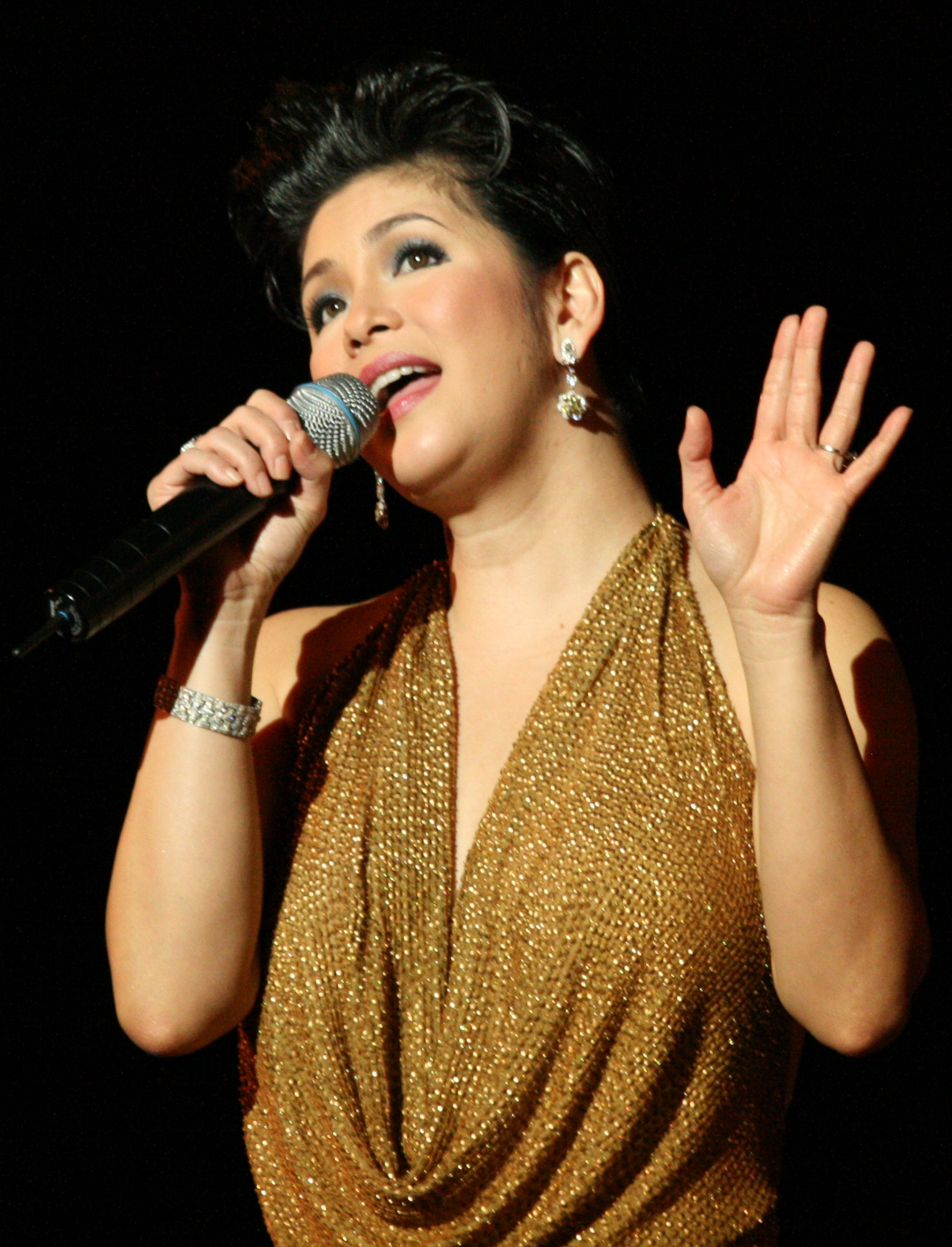
Regine Velasquez

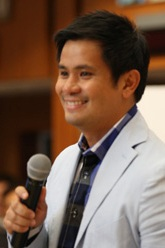
Ogie Alcasid

=== Season 1 ===
==== Judges ====
- Mitch Valdez
- Louie Ocampo
- Buboy Garovillo

==== Contestants ====
Contestant	Profession	Status	Date
Tessa Prieto-Valdes	Columnist	Winner	October 20, 2007
Jessica Rodriguez	Actress	7th eliminated	October 20, 2007
Hayden Kho Jr.	Model	6th eliminated	October 20, 2007
Manny Calayan	Surgeon	5th eliminated	October 13, 2007
Wyngard Tracy	Manager	4th eliminated	October 6, 2007
Tim Yap	Television host	3rd eliminated	September 22, 2007
Frederick Peralta	Fashion designer	2nd eliminated	September 1, 2007
Anna Theresa Licaros	Beauty queen	1st eliminated	August 18, 2007

==== Duet partners ====
Contestant	Celebrity
Tessa Prieto-Valdes	Kyla, Jolina Magdangal, Billy Crawford, Kitchie Nadal, Manilyn Reynes, Rufa Mae Quinto, Arnell Ignacio, Michael V., Joey G. of Side A, Mike Hanopol and Aia de Leon of Imago.
Jessica Rodriguez	Jay R, Radha, Joey G. of Side A, Vernie Varga, Janet Basco, Raymond Lauchengco, Martin Nievera, Cacai Velasquez-Mitra, Sheree, Bo Cerudo and Jaya.
Hayden Kho Jr.	Agot Isidro, Nyoy Volante, Luke Mejares, Jamie Rivera, Jennylyn Mercado, Jon Joven, Robert Seña, Katrina Halili, Dingdong Dantes, Ayen Laurel and Jay Durias.
Manny Calayan	Brenan Espartinez, Karel Marquez, Rachel Alejandro, Faith Cuneta, Allan K., Keempee de Leon, K Brosas, Aicelle Santos, Jenine Desiderio and Jeffrey Hidalgo.
Wyngard Tracy	Jaya, Wency Cornejo, Paolo Santos, Maricris Garcia, Basil Valdez, Jinky Vidal, Gabby Eigenmann, Mark Bautista and Kuh Ledesma.
Tim Yap	Gian Magdangal, Janno Gibbs, Randy Santiago, Yasmien Kurdi, Pops Fernandez, Keith Martin and Jose Manalo.
Frederick Peralta	Pilita Corrales, Bituin Escalante, Nonoy Zuñiga and Dulce.
Anna Theresa Licaros	Jett Pangan and Karylle.

=== Season 2 ===
==== Judges ====
- Freddie Santos
- Danny Tan
- Tessa Prieto-Valdes

==== Contestants ====
Contestant	Profession	Status	Date
Bayani Fernando	MMDA Chairman	Winner	November 8, 2008
JC Buendia	Fashion designer	7th eliminated	November 8, 2008
Joey Marquez	Actor	6th eliminated	November 8, 2008
Carlene Aguilar	Beauty queen	5th eliminated	October 25, 2008
Phil Younghusband	Football player	4th eliminated	October 11, 2008
JL Cang	Chef	3rd eliminated	September 27, 2008
Cory Quirino	Columnist	2nd eliminated	September 13, 2008
Melanie Marquez	Actress	1st eliminated	September 6, 2008

==== Duet partners ====
Contestant	Celebrity
Bayani Fernando	Renz Verano, Nonoy Zuñiga, Andrew E., Janno Gibbs, John Lapus, Julie Anne San Jose, Bituin Escalante, Willie Nepomuceno, Pilita Corrales, Pinky Marquez, Joey Lina, Basil Valdez and Pilita Corrales.
JC Buendia	Randy Santiago, Jinky Vidal, Jet Pangan, Kimi Lu, Ayen Munji-Laurel, Yasmien Kurdi, Joey Generoso, Allan K., Teri Onor, Lovi Poe, Franco Laurel and Jonalyn Viray.
Joey Marquez	Nonoy Zuñiga, Randy Santiago, Keempee de Leon, Richard Gomez, Kyla, Mike Hanopol, Aiza Seguerra, Julia Clarete, Kuh Ledesma, Mike "Pekto" Nacua, Jowi Ann Marquez, Pops Fernandez and Keempee de Leon.
Carlene Aguilar	Agot Isidro, Aicelle Santos, Rochelle Pangilinan, Duncan Ramos, Dulce, Karylle, Katrina Halili, Jay Durias, Maureen Larrazabal and Mocha.
Phil Younghusband	Aicelle Santos, Jay R, Maricris Garcia, Nyoy Volante, Sheree, Hayden Kho, Eula Valdez and Jolina Magdangal.
JL Cang	Jinky Vidal, Agot Isidro, Wency Cornejo, Angelika dela Cruz, Ney Dimaculangan and Gian Magdangal.
Cory Quirino	Vernie Varga, Renz Verano, Nanette Inventor and Arnell Ignacio.
Melanie Marquez	Jay R, Vernie Varga and Jaya.

=== Season 3 ===
==== Judges ====
- Freddie Santos
- Danny Tan
- Tessa Prieto-Valdes

==== Contestants ====
Contestant	Profession	Status	Date
Joel Cruz	Entrepreneur	Winner	November 14, 2009
Jomari Yllana	Actor	7th eliminated	November 14, 2009
Akihiro Sato	Model	6th eliminated	November 14, 2009
Gina Alajar	Actress	5th eliminated	November 7, 2009
Niccolo Cosme	Photographer	4th eliminated	November 7, 2009
Nonito Donaire Jr.	Boxer	3rd eliminated	October 17, 2009
Maxie Cinco	Fashion designer	2nd eliminated	October 10, 2009
Mikaela Bilbao	Cosmetic surgeon	Quit	October 3, 2009
Janina San Miguel	Beauty queen	1st eliminated	September 12, 2009

==== Duet partners ====
Contestant	Celebrity
Joel Cruz	Jessa Zaragosa, Arnel Ignacio, Geneva Cruz, Bimbo Cerrudo, Vernie Varga, Lovi Poe, Kim Idol, John Lapus, Andrea del Rosario, Melanie Marquez, Michael V. and Mae Flores.
Jomari Yllana	Joey G., Julia Clarete, Raddha, Jett Pangan, Aia, Joey Marquez, Lougee Basabas, Rico J. Puno, Randy Santiago, Wyngard Tracy. Kuh Ledesma and Christian Bautista.
Akihiro Sato	Julia Clarete, Mocha, Duncan Ramos, Allan K, Geoff Taylor, Aicelle Santos, Kris Lawrence, Gino Padilla, Luke Mejares, Carlene Aguilar, Arnel Ignacio and Rich Asuncion.
Gina Alajar	Arnel Ignacio, Gian Magdangal, Evette Pabalan, Tirso Cruz III, Rachel Alejandro, Ryan Eigenmann, Christopher de Leon, Ricky Davao, Carla Abellana and Frederick Peralta.
Niccolo Cosme	Bituin Escalante, Jaya, Jolina Magdangal, Ara Mina Tuesday Vargas, Ate Glow, Kyla, Julie Anne San Jose, Frencheska Farr, and Tim Yap.
Nonito Donaire Jr.	Gian Magdangal, Joey G., Jay R, Moymoy Palaboy, Brenan Espartinez, Rachel Donaire and Mitch Valdez.
Maxie Cinco	Jaya, Jessa Zaragosa, Andrew E., Aiza Seguerra, Wally Bayola, and Philip Lazaro.
Mikaela Bilbao	Mocha, Maureen Larrazabal, Sheree and Gretchen Espina.
Janina San Miguel	Maureen Larrazabal, Bituin Escalante and Paolo Ballesteros.

== Ratings ==
According to AGB Nielsen Philippines' Mega Manila household television ratings, the final episode of Celebrity Duets: Philippine Edition scored a 17.8% rating.

== Accolades ==
Accolades received by Celebrity Duets: Philippine Edition
Year	Award	Category	Recipient	Result	Ref.
2009	23rd PMPC Star Awards for Television	Best Talent Search Program Host	Ogie Alcasid Regine Velasquez	Nominated	
2010	24th PMPC Star Awards for Television	Best Talent Search Program Host	Ogie Alcasid Regine Velasquez	Nominated	
