= Survivor Philippines: Celebrity Showdown =

Season of a Philippine television reality show

- Title card
- Presented by: Richard Gutierrez
- No. of days: 36
- No. of castaways: 18
- Winner: Akihiro Sato
- Runners-up: Solenn Heussaff; Jon Ervic Manalo Vijandre
- Location: Laem Son National Park, Amphoe Kapoe, Ranong Province, Thailand
- No. of episodes: 70 (including 5 recap episodes) + 1 "Final Showdown" Special

Release
- Original release: August 30 – December 5, 2010

Additional information
- Filming dates: July 11 – August 17, 2010

Season chronology
- ← Previous; Palau Next → Celebrity Doubles; Showdown

Survivor Philippines: Celebrity Showdown is the third season of the Philippine version of the reality television series Survivor.

Richard Gutierrez took over hosting duties after the show's previous host, Paolo Bediones, moved to TV5 a few months after the second season ended airing. Unlike the first two seasons, this installment would feature 18 celebrities from different fields of film, TV, sports and pop culture. Teasers of the castaways' identities were partially revealed between July and August 2010 before they were revealed on August 14, 2010.

The show would be the second time that the Philippine franchise would take place in Thailand (after the first season). Also, the edition took place for only 36 days (although some printed teasers put the duration at 40) instead of the usual 39. This would also be the first one in which castaways would live in a single camp before eventually splitting into three tribes. The three tribes, as well as the merged tribe, are named after Burmese mythical creatures: the crocodile-like creature Magan, the dragon Nagar, the long-haired ox Sar Mayee (Sarmaree), and the eagle warrior Galone (Garuda's Burmese counterpart). The various Burmese references were attributed to the setting's proximity to Myanmar. The show premiered on GMA Network on August 30, 2010.

The season was won by Brazilian-Japanese model and TV actor Akihiro Sato, with a vote of 3–2–2 in its live finale aired on December 3, 2010.

== Twists and changes ==
- Tribe Leaders: Tribe-colored armbands were given to the tribe leaders to symbolize their tribe's position. Their role in the game was significant for challenges and other tribe matters.

- Tribe Leader Vote: This twist only allowed the tribe leader to vote off a tribe mate and only occurred on the second Tribal Council.

- Isla Misteryo: Based on the "Exile Island" twist on the US version, known in this case as "Isla Misteryo" (lit. "Mystery Island"), where a chosen member of each tribe would stay until the following Immunity challenge. While immunity is indeed waiting at Isla Misteryo, obtaining it is a little different. Instead, castaways would search for gold coins to be used as currency to buy certain items at a store there. Those items include creature comforts, reminders of home, and immunity bracelets.
- Kidnapping: Completely different from the first season, instead of the kidnapped castaway staying in the opposing tribe for a period of time, he/she would become a member of the tribe who kidnapped him/her. This power was given to the first winning tribe on the Cycle 3 Reward Challenge.
- Tribal Shuffle: This twist dissolved a certain tribe who had the fewest castaways. To put the castaways from the dissolved tribe into the remaining tribes, new tribe leaders were determined first by picking rocks, after which a schoolyard pick occurred.
- Double Elimination Tribal Council: For the third consecutive season, this twist had returned, which occurred just before the merge. This time, the winning tribe would join the losing tribe in voting off another castaway from the latter tribe.
- Jury House: The activities of the jury members in a so-called "Jury House", where they would stay until the final Tribal Council, were aired. For consistency with other Survivor articles, events in the Jury House are not covered in this article and in succeeding ones.
- 7th Jury Member Vote:, The penultimate Tribal Council involved the 6 members of the jury and the final 4 voting to eliminate one of the final 4, making the evictee the 7th and final member of the jury. The results of this vote was revealed live back in Manila on its live finale. The vote resulted in a tied vote, leading to a live re-vote.
- Sole Survivor Live Vote: After the final 3 were declared, the Final Tribal Council was held and 7 members of the jury voted for the Sole Survivor between the final three live (as opposed to the normal format where the vote would be held on the island).

== Contestants ==
Contestant	Original tribe	Day 9 tribe (Note: As part of the reward, Nagar abducted Ervic to become their tribemate.)	Shuffled tribe	Merged tribe	Finish
Princess Snell; StarStruck (season 5) Avenger/Actress	None				Quit; Day 2
Ferdinand "Doc Ferdz" Recio; Veterinarian/TV host	Magan				1st voted out Day 6
Myka Flores; Comedienne	Magan	Magan			2nd voted out Day 9
Buhawi Meneses; Parokya ni Edgar/Franco bassist	Magan	Magan			3rd voted out Day 11
Glomirose "Karen" delos Reyes; Former commercial model/Actress	Sar Mayee	Sar Mayee	Nagar		4th voted out Day 13
Ronaldo "Pretty Trizsa" Celso; Stand-up comedienne	Sar Mayee	Sar Mayee	Sar Mayee		5th voted out Day 16
Mico Aytona; TV host	Magan	Magan	Nagar		6th voted out Day 19
Ian Batherson; StarStruck (season 5) Avenger/Model	Nagar	Nagar	Nagar		7th voted out Day 19
Jon Hall; Model	Nagar	Nagar	Sar Mayee	Galone	8th voted out 1st jury member Day 22
Aira Bermudez; SexBomb Girls member	Sar Mayee	Sar Mayee	Nagar	Galone	9th voted out 2nd jury member Day 24
Michelle Madrigal; Actress	Nagar	Nagar	Sar Mayee	Galone	10th voted out 3rd jury member Day 27
Ahron Villena; Actor	Nagar	Nagar	Nagar	Galone	11th voted out 4th jury member Day 30
Elma Muros-Posadas; Track/Field Athlete	Magan	Magan	Sar Mayee	Galone	12th voted out 5th jury member Day 33
Moi Marcampo; Commercial model/Personal assistant to Piolo Pascual	Nagar	Nagar	Nagar	Galone	13th voted out 6th jury member Day 35
Aubrey Miles; Film/TV Actress, The Amazing Race Asia 1	Sar Mayee	Sar Mayee	Sar Mayee	Galone	14th voted out 7th jury member Finale night
Jon Ervic Manalo Vijandre; Basketball player/Model	Sar Mayee	Nagar	Sar Mayee	Galone	Runners-up
Solenn Heussaff; Model/Make-up artist	Magan	Magan	Nagar	Galone	Runners-up
Akihiro Sato; Model/TV Actor	Sar Mayee	Sar Mayee	Sar Mayee	Galone	Sole Survivor

== The game ==
Cycles in this article refer to the three-day periods in the game (unless indicated), composed of at least the Immunity Challenge and the subsequent Tribal Council. Except on the first cycle, every cycle begins at the end of the previous Tribal Council. So any events that occurred after a Tribal Council will be chronicled in the next cycle.

Cycle no.	Air dates	Challenge winner(s)		Exiled	Eliminated	Finish
Cycle no.	Air dates	Reward	Immunity	Exiled	Eliminated	Finish
01	August 30 to September 3 and September 6, 2010	Buhawi, Aira (Note: Gray is used to indicate that the challenge is individual and not tribal. Tribes were not yet established at this point.)	Jon, Moi (Note: Won/Given immunity is in form of an immunity bracelet.)	None (Note: Isla Misteryo was still unknown to the castaways.)	Princess	Quit; Day 2
02	September 6 to 10, 2010	Nagar	Nagar	Akihiro	Doc Ferdz	1st voted out Day 6
02	September 6 to 10, 2010	Nagar	Nagar	Michelle	Doc Ferdz	1st voted out Day 6
02	September 6 to 10, 2010	Nagar	Sar Mayee	Solenn	Doc Ferdz	1st voted out Day 6
03	September 13 to 17, 2010	Nagar	Nagar (Note: An additional reward was given to the winning tribe.)	None (Note: There was no Isla Misteryo at this point that no one was exiled.)	Myka	2nd voted out Day 9
03	September 13 to 17, 2010	Magan	Sar Mayee	None	Myka	2nd voted out Day 9
04	September 20 to 24, 2010	Magan	Sar Mayee	None	Buhawi	3rd voted out Day 11
04	September 20 to 24, 2010	Magan	Nagar	None	Buhawi	3rd voted out Day 11
05	September 24 and September 27 to 30, 2010	Sar Mayee	Sar Mayee	Elma	Karen	4th voted out Day 13
05	September 24 and September 27 to 30, 2010	Sar Mayee	Sar Mayee	Mico	Karen	4th voted out Day 13
06	October 1 and October 4 to 8, 2010	Sar Mayee	Nagar	Moi	Trizsa	5th voted out Day 16
06	October 1 and October 4 to 8, 2010	Sar Mayee	Aubrey	Trizsa	Trizsa	5th voted out Day 16
07	October 11 to 15 and October 18, 2010	Nagar	Sar Mayee	Aira	Mico	6th voted out Day 19
07	October 11 to 15 and October 18, 2010	Nagar	Sar Mayee	Akihiro (Note: The bottle Akihiro found on Day 7 instructed him to go to Isla Misteryo along with one member from each tribe.)	Ian	7th voted out Day 19
07	October 11 to 15 and October 18, 2010	Nagar	Sar Mayee	Ervic	Ian	7th voted out Day 19
08	October 18 to 22, 2010	Nagar	Akihiro	None (Note: Isla Misteryo was retired at the merge.)	Jon	8th voted out 1st jury member Day 22
09	October 22 and October 25 to 29, 2010	Aira, Solenn [Elma, Moi]	Moi	None	Aira	9th voted out 2nd jury member Day 24
10	November 1 to 5, 2010	Akihiro [Ahron]	Ervic	None	Michelle	10th voted Out; 3rd jury member Day 27
11	November 5 and November 8 to 11, 2010	Ervic	Akihiro	None	Ahron	11th voted out 4th jury member Day 30
12	November 12 and November 15 to 18, 2010	Moi	Akihiro	None	Elma	12th voted out 5th jury member Day 33
13	November 18 to 19 and November 22, 2010	None	~~Ervic~~ (Note: Ervic won the challenge, but gave immunity to Aubrey in exchange for an alternate prize, which was a car.) (Aubrey)	None	Moi	13th voted out 6th jury member Day 35
Finale	November 23 to 25 and December 3, 2010			None	Aubrey	14th voted out 7th jury member Finale night
Finale	November 23 to 25 and December 3, 2010				Jury vote	
Finale	November 23 to 25 and December 3, 2010				Ervic	Runners-up
Finale	November 23 to 25 and December 3, 2010				Solenn	Runners-up
Finale	November 23 to 25 and December 3, 2010				Akihiro	Sole Survivor

== Episodes ==
=== Cycle 1: Days 1-3 ===
- Reward Challenge: In a challenge based on the four classical elements, the castaways would start by scaling a wall and traverse a cargo net. They would then run to a mud pit, retrieve at least three rings of the same color (red or yellow), emerge from the pit, walk over a bed of hot coals and shoot the rings to a pole. When the reserve of rings ran out, they could go back to the mud pit and retrieve at least another ring to repeat the process. Once three rings had been shot to the pole, they would then run to a platform and raise a flag. First two to raise their flag would win.
  - Reward: A scroll each. One to be opened on the spot and the other be opened on the holder's first Tribal Council.
- Immunity Challenge: Using a piece of flint and several pieces of tinder, castaways would try to light a fire high enough to burn a rope. The two persons who did this would each win an immunity bracelet that they may use on a Tribal Council of their choice.

Day 1: At a hotel in Ranong, Thailand, the celebrities, as well as Philippine and Thai media were assembled for an upcoming press conference. During the event, the celebrities, still in their formal attire, were dragged out of the hotel by several locals and whisked away in several small songthaews. Upon arrival at a designated spot, they were met by Richard and were told that the game had started there. To bring home the point of being on their own, their luggages were burned in front of them. They were also told that they would start as one tribe. The host even handed a piece of flint to Buhawi. They were also given a map to their camp, and told to arrive before sundown. Along the way, they gathered tags with their names on them. Meanwhile, Ian lost his nametag and went searching for it, with some of his fellow castaways helping as well. Ian's tag was eventually found by Doc Ferdz. Upon arrival at camp, several castaways already started making shelter and fire. After eating a meager amount of oysters, the castaways attempted to sleep amid the pouring rain and the swarming mosquitoes.

Day 2: Moi, Elma, and Buhawi started gathering more food, which the rest of the castaways shared. Meanwhile, Trizsa and Aubrey talked about the latter's past relations with Jon. Similarly, Jon was thinking of ways to use his past relationship with Aubrey to further himself in the game. The first Reward Challenge was first finished by Buhawi, followed by Aira. Buhawi opened the contents of his scroll, which said of him being designated as "tribe leader". Aira would open hers at her first Tribal Council. Meanwhile, Princess, who never advanced through the cargo net after the challenge had finished, stayed behind at the challenge area. Later that night, to pass the time, Trizsa, Ian, Aubrey, and Myka did some role playing. Princess talked about her grievances and troubles with the show's resident psychologist. It was during this talk that she expressed her declaration to quit the game altogether due to hunger.

Day 3: Talk was on the still-absent Princess and her apparent weaknesses in the game. Later, Buhawi, together with Doc Ferdz, started to organize the castaways to do certain chores. Aira, Elma, Moi and Myka did the gathering of food, while Buhawi, Doc Ferdz, and Jon subsequently built the new shelter. Meanwhile, Myka suggested that she, Buhawi and Elma form an alliance with Doc Ferdz. Talk about Tribal Council led to a consensus in voting out Princess, if she would return, or Trizsa, who had suggested to Aubrey in voting out the strong. After a meal of crabs and oysters, they received treemail saying there was something good waiting at a neighboring island. They heaved themselves there to find several live chickens, which they retrieved for food. The castaways later headed to Tribal Council. It was there the others knew about Princess's departure from the game. After some talk about their initial days at camp, Buhawi received a green armband as a sign of him being tribe leader. Aira opened her scroll, which said of three tribal leaders, her being the second, and all voting for that night determining the third. It further said that no one would be voted out. Because of it, Aira received her tribal leader armband, a yellow one. The vote resulted in Jon being installed as the third leader (wearing red) with 9 votes, Doc Ferdz at 5, Elma 2, and Trizsa 1. The castaways were then presented a can containing ₱100,000, being told that the winners would win the money and an immunity bracelet, aside from pizza for everyone, in exchange for joining the challenge and having their hair shaved off (including facial and body hair for the men). Four men, Moi and Myka accepted the challenge, which brought to the fire-making challenges, which Jon and Moi ultimately won. After all the events, the tribe leaders were reminded that they would be divided into three tribes the next day.

=== Cycle 2: Days 4-6 ===
- Reward Challenge: Inside a bowl was a broth containing certain animal offals. The tribe leader would search for a called animal part in the bowl and would pass it to the next tribemate using their mouth. This process would go on until the animal part reached the fifth tribemate, who would then drop the part into another bowl. First tribe to do this would gain one point. First tribe to gain three points would win the larger reward.
  - Reward: A piece of flint, a large water container, a large cooking pot, a machete, and a cache of rice for the winning tribe; matches, smaller water containers, smaller pots, machetes, and less rice for the losing tribes. The winning tribe would also be visited by a "special guest."
- Immunity Challenge: Each tribe would paddle out to a floating platform. The tribe leader would not take part in the paddling, instead gathering ladder pieces tied to buoys along the way. Once at the floating platform, the tribe leader would retrieve the flag there and have the rest of the tribe row back to shore. Once at shore, the tribe leader would stand by at a tribal mat while the rest of the tribe would correctly assemble the ladder, which the tribe leader would use to scale up a standing platform and plant the flag upon it. The first two tribes to finish would win immunity.

Night of Day 3: Elma woke up to find Myka crying mainly due to the cold and to the reminders of home. Elma and Buhawi tried to comfort her.

Day 4: Knowing the eventual tribal split, Elma decided to butcher one of the group's four chickens for everyone to eat. To everyone's surprise, Akihiro hunted out on his own and came back with crabs as additional sustenance. Later, Trizsa and the women did a fashion show to fight boredom. Akihiro once again surprised his companions when he and Doc Ferdz returned with several coconuts. During a walk to a bathing spot, Ervic and Mico planned on protecting each other. Before the reward challenge, the three tribes were formed by schoolyard pick. Buhawi's tribe had Solenn, Doc Ferdz, Elma, Mico, and Myka and was named Magan. Aira's group, Sar Mayee, included Akihiro, Aubrey, Ervic, Karen, and Trizsa. Moi, Ahron, Michelle, and Ian would make up Jon's tribe Nagar. Nagar barely won the reward challenge 3-2-2. Solenn, Akihiro, and Michelle were then selected by their respective tribes to stay at Isla Misteryo. There, they found the store, but decided not to buy anything. Meanwhile, Nagar went to their new camp, where they met first season winner JC Tiuseco. JC helped the tribe in building their shelter and making fire. Sar Mayee and Magan also returned to their new camps and attempted to use their limited resources. Sar Mayee's situation was worsened when Aira accidentally broke their pot.

Day 5: In the Immunity Challenge, Nagar quickly gathered their ladder pieces, but arguments within them about the ladder assembly led Magan and Sar Mayee to catch up. Despite that, Nagar took first place while Sar Mayee overtook Magan to snatch second place. Upon return to their respective camps, Michelle decided not to divulge her activities at Isla Misteryo to her tribemates, while Akihiro openly revealed his gold coins to the rest of Sar Mayee. Meanwhile, Trizsa did not clean after himself, disgusting his tribemates. This, his laziness, and other factors led him to become distant and recluse, causing him to temporarily leave the island to talk to the resident psychologist. He later returned to the island, to Akihiro's surprise.

Day 6: At each tribe, the tribe leader was delivered food. Furthermore, he/she would share some of it to his/her tribemates in exchange for a task given by him/her. At Magan, Buhawi each talked strategy with Mico, Elma, and Doc Ferdz while sharing his food with them. Overhearing the conversations, Myka felt she was targeted and distanced herself for a while before she was reassured by Buhawi. At Nagar, Ahron became concerned for his life in the game, as he noticed Ian was being wooed by Jon and Michelle to their alliance. At Tribal Council, while Magan was generally happy at the composition of the tribe, Myka admitted wanting to replace Doc Ferdz with someone else. The lack of coordination and teamwork within the tribe also came up as a main reason for the tribe's loss in the Immunity Challenge. Another twist was then revealed: only the tribe leader would decide who would be eliminated that night. Buhawi chose to vote out Doc Ferdz, to everyone's shock.

=== Cycle 3: Days 7-9 ===
- Reward Challenge: Each tribe would have a gear puzzle connected to a container of rice with a hole on the bottom for the rice to flow. A "solver" would be assigned in each tribe. The rest of the tribe would get gears from a box and give them to the solver, who would figure out the correct gears to place in order to move a mechanism that would stop the flow of rice. The first tribe to finish would get the larger reward, while the second tribe would get the lesser reward.
  - Reward: Fishing gear and a scroll to be read later for the first winning tribe, as well as getting back all items stolen from their camp. The second winning tribe would have only three of their lost items returned. All tribes that finished the challenge, regardless of placing, would also take home the rice that they saved during the challenge.
- Immunity Challenge: A member of each tribe would shoot a ball through a spinball machine, which would contain five holes, each hole equivalent to a certain number of points (1 to 5). After 10 shots, the score would be tallied. A point would be equivalent to a kilogram of sand to be placed on the shoulders of the tribe's strongest member, who must handle the weight for as long as they can. The first person to drop their load would lose for their tribe; the other two tribes would win immunity.
  - Additional reward: Meal of beef to be shared by both winning tribes.

Night of Day 6: The Magan tribe silently returned to camp as the frustration of the other tribe members loomed on Buhawi eliminating Doc Ferdz.

Day 7: At Magan, when Buhawi asked Elma if he made the correct decision to vote out Doc Ferdz, she told him to just stand up for his choice. When a new treemail instructed each tribe to pack up for a long walk, but leave behind one of their own to watch over camp, the tribes chose Myka, Trizsa, and Moi. While the other castaways sought out for an unspecified object, Myka, Trizsa, and Moi were each then instructed to raid one other tribe's camp (i.e. Myka at Nagar's camp, Trizsa at Magan's, and Moi at Sar Mayee's) and steal any five objects they would find there. The raids resulted in water pots being taken away, as well as Trizsa stealing most of Magan's essentials and Myka pilfering Michelle's bikini top, among other things. Meanwhile, Akihiro found a bottle with a very cryptic clue inside and shared it with his tribemates. Upon everybody's return to camp, rain poured down, causing Myka to shiver profusely. She was given medical attention and ultimately was unable to compete in the Reward Challenge. In the said Challenge, Nagar once again dominated while Magan redeemed themselves by finishing second. Sar Mayee was still unfinished by the time the rice in their container ran out; thus, they would take home no rice. Back at camp, while Aira and Karen chided Ervic for his frequent rests, the latter was already confiding with Aubrey about their game plan. At Magan, Mico, Elma, and Solenn had their resolve to stick together.

Day 8: The spinball part of the Immunity Challenge resulted in Elma lifting 26 kilograms (57 lb), Akihiro 23 kilograms (51 lb) and Jon 22 kilograms (49 lb). Forty-five minutes into the endurance part of the challenge, Elma, who was lifting the heaviest load, was the first to quit, making Magan lose their second consecutive Immunity Challenge. After the challenge, a scroll was opened to reveal that Nagar and Sar Mayee would have a meal together; so the two tribes spent the rest of the day having their meal at Nagar's camp. While gathering water, Aubrey made up a story to Ian about the Sar Mayee girls already forming an alliance. Ian related what he heard to Jon, concerning the latter. Jon was further appalled when Moi gave permission to several Sar Mayee tribe members to take home extra parts of the roof of Nagar's shelter as the other tribe was about to return to their camp. Heated arguments occurred among members of Nagar concerning the events that happened while Sar Mayee was still in their camp. At Magan, while the rest of the tribe slept without fire, Myka was once again shivering and slipping in and out of consciousness. Already dehydrated, she was evacuated to the nearest hospital.

Day 9: Opening the scroll that they won in the Reward Challenge, they were instructed to capture one member of Sar Mayee and make that person part of their tribe. At Sar Mayee, a treemail instructed them to send one member on a mission, to which Ervic volunteered. He therefore became Nagar's newest member, surrendering to them without incident. Upon seeing Ervic, Jon and Ian became worried as the former's affinity with Moi would equalize the alliances at Nagar. Back at Sar Mayee, Karen and Trizsa competed against each other in making better beds for their tribe. At Nagar, Jon buried Michelle's coins beside a tree for safekeeping. His ambiguous description to Michelle of the burial site, however, confused the latter. Myka rejoined the rest of Magan at Tribal Council, having been cleared by doctors to continue with the game. Among the topics discussed there were the happenings in the previous challenges, and the effects of Doc Ferdz's elimination. In the end, with voting power returned to the entire tribe, concerns over Myka's health made her the second person voted out, 4–1.

=== Cycle 4: Days 10-11 ===
- Reward Challenge: Each tribe would prepare a stint that would be performed in front of the other tribes and a panel of judges. They would use only the materials provided, for props, costumes, and practice music. The performances would be judged based on concept, stage performance, and costume design. The tribe with the best performance rated by the panel would win the reward.
  - Reward: Additional cooking utensils and supplies, more materials for shelter, and a visit by the panel.
- Immunity Challenge: Tribe members must eat all of the food, composed of fried creepy crawlies, on their table before the other tribes. All members must participate as the amount of food to be consumed by a tribe would be proportional to the number of members. A tribe member should not throw up; doing so would disqualify him/her from further participation. The first two tribes to finish their food would win immunity and the additional reward. If no tribes were able to finish their food after an allotted time, the two tribes with the least leftovers would win.
  - Additional reward: Bottles of mouthwash.

Day 10: At Magan, the morning was spent for Solenn's surprise birthday celebration. At Nagar, already disillusioned by Jon's statements about Ervic, and knowing the truth about Michelle and the gold coins, Ian formed an alliance with Ervic. Treemail told the tribes to prepare for the Reward Challenge that night. The tribes were then visited by Palau winner Amanda Coolley van Cooll, first runner-up Justine Ferrer, and first season contestant Zita Ortiga, who delivered materials to be used for the performances, and oversaw their rehearsals. During Nagar's rehearsal, a sarcastic remark almost caused a spat between Ahron and Ian, if not by the intervention of Ervic to quell the two. Before the Reward Challenge, Sar Mayee finally found out, to their shock, about Ervic's unwitting switch to Nagar. It was further revealed that Amanda, Justine, and Zita would also judge their performances. Afterwards, it was then revealed that Magan won the reward by being given a score of 92.6%, followed by Sar Mayee at 85%, and Nagar placing last at 75.3%. As a result, the judges slept with the Magan tribe for that night. On the other hand, Sar Mayee was still stunned in Ervic's transfer, forcing them to alter their alliance plans.

Day 11: At Magan, the guests then helped out in the tribe's chores, as part of the tribe's reward. They then bade their farewells and left, just as Solenn came back with treemail. This was because the three would once again oversee the upcoming challenge. In the Immunity challenge, no tribe was able to finish their food after the allotted time. Sar Mayee was judged to have the least leftovers, with Magan and Nagar tied for second place. In the tiebreaker, Ian finished his three scorpions first before Solenn, ensuring a third loss to Magan for immunity. With another night at Tribal Council looming, Magan came back to camp in a somber mood, unsure of their next moves. Elma then requested her tribemates to vote her out, to which they disagreed. Solenn also brought up the possibility of a reshuffle. Meanwhile, at Sar Mayee, Aira complained of itchiness and rashes on her skin and face. With the possibility of anaphylactic shock, she was taken to the hospital for treatment. She was cleared by doctors soon after and returned to the island. At Magan's third consecutive Tribal Council, the tribe felt Buhawi failed them as a tribe leader and decided to vote him out, 3–1.

=== Cycle 5: Days 12-13 ===
- Reward Challenge: Each tribe would scale a pyramid using still locked steps. Each step would have a question about past challenges and experiences so far in the game and would be unlocked using a key that would bear the correct answer. If a tribe member would successfully unlock a step, they must go back down and tag the next member to answer the next question; if that member would have troubles answering the question, they could go down and have the next member answer. Once the steps were unlocked, another tribe member would then go up to the top of the pyramid and unlock a chest by answering one last question. Inside the chest are puzzle pieces of a totem pole, which the tribe member must solve and put at the center table. First tribe to finish would win the reward.
  - Reward: A Thai massage session back at camp.
- Immunity Challenge: Each tribe would have four climbers and three puzzle solvers. The climbers must traverse a network of hanging ropes. Once through, they would then climb up a net wall and retrieve a bag of puzzle pieces and race back to the starting line to tag the next climber. When a climber falls from the ropes, they must go back to try again; three such falls would require the climber to go back to tag the next climber. Once eight bags are retrieved, the solvers would then open the bags and attempt to solve the monkey puzzle inside. First tribe to form their monkey puzzle would win immunity.

Night of Day 11: Upon returning to camp, Magan discussed their decision to unanimously vote out Buhawi and further asserted their resolve to stick together, no matter where each of them would go.

Day 12: Before the Reward Challenge began, Richard announced that with three members left, Magan would be abolished and a tribe reshuffle among all castaways would determine the new composition of the two remaining tribes. The castaways then drew lots to figure out who would be the two new tribe leaders. Akihiro and Ahron picked the yellow and red rocks, making them the new tribe leaders of Sar Mayee and Nagar respectively. Through another schoolyard pick, the new Sar Mayee had Aubrey, Ervic, Elma, Jon, Michelle, and Trizsa; while the new Nagar consisted of Moi, Mico, Solenn, Ian, Aira, and Karen. At the Reward Challenge itself, Jon's continued dominance brought triumph to his new tribe Sar Mayee. Before everyone went back to camp, Elma and Mico volunteered to exile themselves at Isla Misteryo. At the Sar Mayee camp, Aubrey, Trizsa, and Michelle enjoyed the massage while Jon, Ervic, and Akihiro tended the camp and made plans to improve their shelter. At Nagar, the new members quickly settled in at the tribe's superior shelter. At Isla Misteryo, Mico and Elma initially searched for any immunity object. But when they found the store and the wares it was selling, the two started to weigh in on their possible options, considering how much gold coins they would have to pay for their wanted items. They eventually retrieved some gold coins and some fruits, but decided to eat the fruits and save the coins for later. At Nagar, the tribe slowly realized that the schoolyard pick resulted in them being inferior to the other tribe in terms of physical strength and appearance. The men, while having their bath time, planned on taking out Karen first. At Sar Mayee, while they were having their massage together with Akihiro, Jon and Ervic also predicted Karen's ouster if Nagar would lose the next Immunity Challenge. It was later apparent that Jon and Michelle were having a hard time adjusting to their new camp life.

Day 13: In the Immunity Challenge, Sar Mayee led far ahead of Nagar up to the puzzle phase, where Aubrey purposely stalled to give Nagar a chance to catch up. While this tactic worked, to the point that Nagar also reached the puzzle phase, Sar Mayee still managed to finish the puzzle first and win. Upon return to camp, Trizsa was being convinced by Michelle to vote against Aubrey, should their tribe have their turn at Tribal Council. Meanwhile, Aubrey, Ervic, and Akihiro were confident that Jon and Michelle's alliance was still a minority. At Nagar, Moi felt herself targeted for being the main cause of the tribe's loss in the Immunity Challenge. The men affirmed their stand to oust Karen. At night, back at Sar Mayee, Michelle had a breakdown because of the hardships she was having at her new camp. At Nagar's first Tribal Council, Moi was given the option of using the immunity bracelet she won in the first ever Tribal Council; she decided not to take advantage of it. Karen's vote against Moi therefore counted, but Karen then became the one voted off by Moi and the men, 4–2–1.

=== Cycle 6: Days 14-16 ===
- Reward Challenge: A number of members from each tribe would be tied to each other with a rope, and would trudge through the mud towards a doll at their edge of the field while pulling their opponents away from theirs. The first to retrieve the doll would gain a point for their tribe; first tribe with four points would win the reward.
  - Reward: A shower with bath products and toiletries, and a supply of coffee and biscuits.
- Immunity Challenge: Tribe members would stand on stumps holding three eggs: one between the palms of the hands (with the thumbs at the same level as the nose) and one at the inside of each arm. Cracking the egg or causing it to drop would eliminate the holder. The tribe with members still standing after all members of the opposing tribe are eliminated would win immunity.

Day 14: At Nagar, Aira noted how nonchalant Karen was when she was eliminated in the previous evening's Tribal Council. At Sar Mayee, Elma taught her tribemates how to make rice coffee. Video cameras then arrived at both camps, and as instructed by the accompanying treemail, the castaways made video messages to their loved ones back home. Back at Nagar, Ahron felt pain on his shoulders while gathering firewood. In the Reward Challenge, Sar Mayee triumphed once again, 4–1. After the challenge, while Sar Mayee celebrated, Ahron complained that his shoulder pain worsened during the last part of the challenge to the point that he couldn't raise his arms, thus, requiring him medical attention. But before he was taken away to the medical base, he and Akihiro chose Moi and Trisza respectively, to be sent to Isla Misteryo. The Sar Mayee tribe then had their baths at a shower station and picked up their biscuits and coffee. At Isla Misteryo, Moi and Trizsa were given clues to the coins, which led Trizsa to a bag of coins hanging in a tree. Back at Nagar, Ahron returned to his tribe after his shoulder pains were relieved. Meanwhile, Mico and Solenn were planning on having Aira on their alliance. At Sar Mayee, the tribe continued to indulge on the cookies that they planned to leave a few, if not none, for Trizsa.

Day 15: After a stormy evening, the rain-drenched Nagar started rebuilding the roof's shelter and restarting a fire. At Sar Mayee, Ervic used his time with Elma to urge her to join his alliance. At Isla Misteryo, Moi finally found her luck in finding the buried coins. During her talk with Trizsa, the latter revealed his alliance with Jon and the voting options that they were planning. In the Immunity Challenge, spills, the rain, and temptations eliminated many castaways, leaving Elma, Aubrey, Mico, and Solenn still standing after three hours. Elma came down first when another temptation, a BLT sandwich, was presented. Thirty-six minutes later, an immunity bracelet was shown as yet another temptation, which Aubrey accepted. This gave Nagar tribal immunity in the process. Before leaving the challenge area, questionnaires were handed out to the tribes to be answered back at camp. With Aubrey already immune, Sar Mayee, particularly Jon's alliance, was left scrambling on who else to vote.

Day 16: At Sar Mayee, Michelle, Trizsa, and Ervic became the most viable choices to be voted out, but the confusion caused by Elma and Trizsa switching sides started to pressure Jon and Michelle. Later, the tribe received treemail, telling them to use their coins at Isla Misteryo as the store there would close anytime soon. Jon crossed into Nagar territory to retrieve Michelle's coins and borrow some rope, catching the tribe by surprise. Upon his return to Sar Mayee, the scrambling had him and Michelle fight in front of their tribemates to the point that the former slightly trashed their camp, and the latter separating herself from Jon for a while. Jon soon reconciled with Michelle, with him giving his immunity bracelet to her. But with Jon saying that he still had the immunity bracelet, he urged several of his tribemates to vote against Trizsa. Trizsa then made a last-ditch effort to align himself with the other original Sar Mayee members. At Tribal Council, Jon and Aubrey decided not to use their immunity bracelets. Jon's vote from Trizsa thus counted, but the latter's efforts to stay in the game were proven futile after he was voted off, 6–1.

=== Cycle 7: Days 17-19 ===
- Reward Challenge: Five members of each tribe would each lie on a bed, handling a metal ball on one hand over a metal bowl. Castaways should not sleep or be relaxed enough to cause the ball to drop onto the bowl. To make the objective harder, potential sleep inducers would be brought in. The first tribe to have two members drop a ball would lose, making the opposing tribe win the reward.
  - Reward: Beds, pillows, blankets, and additional shelter for the winning tribe's camp.
- Immunity Challenge: Each tribe would have a giant 5×5 sudoku puzzle and would elect a puzzle overseer. At the onset, the other members of each tribe would gather the colored number balls from all over the field. From below the puzzle grid, they would then, with the guidance of the overseer, arrange the balls to conform to that of a regular sudoku. First tribe to correctly solve their puzzle would win immunity.
  - Additional reward: The winning tribe would go on and watch the losing tribe's Tribal Council. Furthermore, they would participate in the second round of voting in the said Tribal Council.

Night of Day 16: Nagar received treemail, similar to that obtained by Sar Mayee, about their usage of the coins at the store at Isla Misteryo.

Day 17: Sar Mayee remembered Trizsa and how his absence affected the tribe for the better. Both tribes were then instructed to gather at a certain spot. There, they were met by Drew Arellano, who told them about a buried boat, some flags, and several bottles of energy drink. The tribes then helped each other in finding and unearthing the said items. In the evening, the tribes were once again gathered, this time, to feast on the cookies, biscuits, and assorted drinks Richard prepared for them. Beds, seen during the feast, turned out to be the venue of the Reward Challenge. After four hours and fifteen minutes with everyone still awake, Richard brought about a last-minute rule change: The first person to drop their ball would lose for their tribe. Twenty minutes later, Elma dropped her ball, giving Nagar their second straight challenge win. After the challenge, Akihiro was reminded of the cryptic clue he found back in Day 7, which would reveal him going to Isla Misteryo on its store's final day. He chose Ervic to accompany him, while Aira was chosen by Nagar to be at the island. They were also given letters from home. Aubrey was allowed to read hers on the spot while everyone else's would be read in the morning back at camp.

Day 18: At Isla Misteryo, after finding out that the immunity bracelet was being sold for 30 coins, Ervic and Aira started digging while Akihiro slept. Knowing that Aira was the only original Sar Mayee member left in Nagar, Ervic and Akihiro helped her by adding their coins to her fund and motivating her to dig for more by telling her that she was the most likely the next to be voted off by her tribemates. At Sar Mayee, the tribe finished their shelter's roof just as the rain poured. Nagar, meanwhile, was visited by Drew, who cooked breakfast of tapsilog for them, as another part of the tribe's reward. He also gave several medicinal plants for them to use. All the castaways then took their time in reading their letters. Back at Isla Misteryo, Aira amassed more than enough coins for the immunity bracelet, as well as several other items due to the half-price sale on the store. At Sar Mayee, Jon and Michelle started to plan on having Elma back to their fold. Upon her return to the Nagar camp, Aira reported of her finally obtaining immunity, shattering her tribemates' earlier plan to take her out. Akihiro and Ervic also returned to their camp with Ervic reporting that they had immunity, in an attempt to scare Jon and Michelle; this was quickly foiled after Akihiro told the truth. Both tribes received 5×5 sudoku puzzles in preparation for the Immunity Challenge the next day.

Day 19: Before the Immunity Challenge, Richard announced that it would be the most important challenge in the season. In the said Challenge, Jon's calm demeanor as the overseer enabled Sar Mayee to correctly solve the puzzle first and win immunity and a scroll, which was said to be opened back at camp. Upon opening, they discovered that the scroll instructed them to witness Tribal Council as well. Meanwhile, while Ian, Moi, and Ahron continued with their plan to have Aira out (knowing the use of the immunity bracelet would be optional), Ian presented himself as bait. Moi also saw that Aira wanted Ian out as well. At the last minute, Ian had a talk with Solenn, saying that her closest ally, Mico, had wanted to vote her out sooner. At Tribal Council, with the Sar Mayee tribe present, Nagar discussed their tribe dynamics and traits of the members of the opposition. As a result of the discussion, the women gave Mico an unexpected send-off, 3–2–1. After Mico left, the tribes were told to stay as Richard revealed that a second castaway from Nagar would also leave that night and, in another twist, Sar Mayee would take part in the voting as well. After the second voting, Aira and Moi played their immunity bracelets, which canceled out three votes and one vote respectively. The remaining votes resulted in Ian's departure, 4–2–1–0–0.

=== Cycle 8: Days 20-22 ===
- Reward Challenge: Tribes would race around the city of Ranong towards six destinations. At each destination would be mini-challenges which the tribe must perform, enabling them to receive a scroll containing instructions to their next destination. Tribes were not allowed to split up nor to take public transportation or hitchhike with locals en route. The first tribe to finish the mini-challenges and arrive at the final destination would win the reward. The mini-challenges are outlined as follows:
  Mini-challenge 1: Male tribe members would make a cream out of thanaka bark and apply it on the faces of the female tribe members. The tribe would proceed to the next destination while taking a wheelbarrow with them.
  Mini-challenge 2: The tribe would use the wheelbarrow to transport fruits and vegetables from a designated vendor to a neighboring market.
  Mini-challenge 3: The tribe would sort the fruits and vegetables from their wheelbarrow and make sure nothing was added or had become missing along the way.
  Mini-challenge 4: Tribe members would each eat a bowl of spicy noodles. If one tribe member could not finish their noodles, they could have a tribemate finish it for them. Once finished, they would receive three lobsters for the last mini-challenge.
  Mini-challenge 5: The tribe would ride a designated songthaew towards a hot spring well, where they would cook their lobsters. Only when the chef deemed that the lobsters were cooked that the tribe would get onto the songthaew and proceed to the final destination.
  - Reward: A "strategic advantage" in the next Immunity Challenge (see below): to automatically advance to the second round.
- Immunity Challenge: Contestants would run to a designated part of the sand and dig for sandbags inside chests. There would be a set number of chests, but not all contain sandbags. As long as a contestant has not yet reached their mat with the sandbag, other contestants could steal the said sandbag for themselves. The contestant who reached their mat with the sandbag would qualify for the next round. There would be four rounds, the last of which would involve three contestants over just one sandbag. The person who would reach their mat while having the sandbag would win immunity.

Night of Day 19: Nagar returned to camp. Ahron then rallied his tribe to stick together, knowing Sar Mayee had already outnumbered them six to four.

Day 20: Expecting a merge, the tribes were instructed to leave the island temporarily. Upon arrival at the city of Ranong, they were met with another tribal Reward Challenge, confusing both tribes. At the onset of the said challenge, on their way to their first destination, Michelle got separated from the rest of Sar Mayee, forcing her tribemates to search for her. While Sar Mayee became the first to complete the first mini-challenge, confusion in finding the third destination enabled Nagar to overtake them and eventually win the challenge. The tribes were then given a surprise feast, which celebrated the tribes' merger into Galone. They then proceeded back to their new camp, which was the original Sar Mayee camp, but with the amenities downgraded, forcing some of them to sleep outside the shelter.

Day 21: While the tribe gathered for food, Solenn started scouting for voting options. She first talked to Michelle, who, with Jon, wanted Ervic out. She then confided with Ervic, who was confident with his alliance with Aubrey, Akihiro, and Elma. Meanwhile, Aubrey urged her tribemates not to let Jon and Michelle win, so the latter two could be eliminated sooner. In Galone's first individual Immunity Challenge, Ahron, Aira, Moi, and Solenn's strategic advantage made them advance to the second round. Throughout the challenge, Akihiro overcame everyone with his speed, which made him win immunity.

Day 22: While everyone else slept, Jon and Michelle fondled with each other. Already resigned to being the minority, they touched on whether to use Jon's immunity bracelet or have a third person join them. Later, when the rain stopped, Jon repaired the roof of the shelter alone, not letting anyone else help him. This only strengthened Aubrey's campaign against him and Michelle. The tribe was then tasked to each plant five trees, each with a dedication for their special someones. They then proceeded to their first Tribal Council as a merged tribe. After the voting, Aubrey decided not to use her immunity bracelet while Jon gave his to Michelle so she could use it. But with Aubrey and everyone else splitting their votes between the couple, Jon was then eliminated and became the first member of the jury, 4–2–0.

=== Cycle 9: Days 23-24 ===
- Reward Challenge: Contestants would each place possessions and a chosen comfort item (either a pillow, comforter, or mosquito net) on top of a box resting on a trapdoor. They would then answer showbiz-style questions based on lie detector tests conducted before their departure from the Philippines. Untrue answers would result in the possessions dropping into a mud pit below the trapdoor, as well as elimination from the challenge. Last man standing would win the reward.
  - Reward: A trip to a resort at Ko Phayam with a chosen companion.
- Immunity Challenge: Each contestant would have a tower of 27 blocks arranged into nine levels, in a fashion similar to a Jenga tower. A series of multiple-choice questions based on past challenges and events would be asked. A correct answer for a castaway would leave their tower untouched. Otherwise, a block would have to be moved to the top of the tower, as in Jenga. Causing the tower to fall would eliminate the contestant from the challenge; the one with the last tower standing would win immunity.

Night of Day 22: The Galone tribe silently returned to camp so as not to insult Michelle. The latter, on the other hand, had trouble sleeping as she spent her first night without Jon by her side.

Day 23: In her first day without Jon, Michelle tried her best to interact with her tribemates. Seeing this, Aira proposed to Ahron that the tribe spare Michelle in the next Tribal Council and eliminate Ervic instead. Aira forwarded her proposal to Aubrey, while Ahron tried to do the same with Moi. But when Ervic tagged along with Ahron and Moi, Ahron was forced to divulge the plan to the former, leaving Aira in suspecting Ahron of treason. The tribe was then visited by a fortune teller, who told the tribe of their fortunes through playing cards. Before the Reward Challenge, the tribe randomly picked between either pillows, comforters, and mosquito nets for them to take back to camp, but were told that these would be used first in the said challenge. After multiple questions asked by Lolit Solis, Aira and Solenn became the only ones left. But with both women answering lies in the final rounds, they were both declared winners of the challenge. Solenn chose Elma to accompany her, while Aira chose Moi. They were further told that while all would get their possessions back at Tribal Council, the four women would get their possessions already cleaned, while everyone else would have theirs returned still muddied. Solenn, Elma, Aira, and Moi then proceeded to Ko Phayam to enjoy their reward. Those who were left behind discussed the grueling nature of the challenge and the possibility of the four at Ko Phayam to make any voting plans on their own. Worse, at night, one part of the shelter collapsed, surprising the castaways. At Ko Phayam, after having dinner, the four women discussed having the men voted off first, since the women outnumbered the men, two to one.

Day 24: After Elma, Aira, Moi, and Solenn returned from Ko Phayam, the castaways competed in the Immunity Challenge where Elma became the first to be eliminated under normal rules. But when the questions ran out, a sudden death rule was instituted wherein a block had to be moved within 15 seconds. The challenge later boiled down to between Moi and Michelle, in which the former won immunity. Upon return to camp, Aira started to feel threatened by Aubrey as the latter discussed with Ervic their voting plans. Later, the castaways were visited by Lolit Solis, who interviewed them about camp life, each other's relationships, and the game so far. After Lolit left, Solenn, Ervic, and Ahron played an impromptu dating game while Aira continued to keep tabs on everyone's potential votes. At Tribal Council, while Michelle was indeed spared from elimination, Aira's plan to remove Ervic backfired on her, as she was blindsided and became the second member of the jury, 7–2.

=== Cycle 10: Days 25-27 ===
- Reward Challenge: For five minutes, contestants would bite off chunks from a large hanging piece of meat and put them on their plates using only their mouths while their hands are bound at their backs. There would be two rounds. The first round would involve the castaways and their respective loved ones as teams. The four teams that gathered the heaviest haul of meat would move on to the second round, where only the loved ones would compete. The loved one who had the heaviest haul of meat on their plate would win the reward for their partner castaway.
  - Reward: An overnight stay at a resort in Phuket Island with their loved one, plus ฿10,000 pocket money.
- Immunity Challenge: Contestants would gather keys around a net arranged like a spider web to be used to unlock one of eight doors of the center cage with the immunity necklace inside. The first person to open one door of the cage, get down from the web, and obtain the necklace would win immunity.

Night of Day 24: As the entire Galone tribe returned to camp, they congratulated each other for voting off Aira. They then installed their mosquito nets before sleeping.

Day 25: Before the Reward Challenge, the castaways had a reunion with their respective loved ones: Ervic's mother, Elma's husband, Ahron's father, Moi's friend, Solenn's brother, and Akihiro's friend, as well as Michelle's sister Ehra and Aubrey's partner Troy Montero. The castaways and their loved ones then teamed up for the said challenge. The first round resulted in Ahron's, Moi's, Ervic's, and Akihiro's respective loved ones competing in the second round. During the second round, play was halted when Ahron's father broke a tooth and drew blood. After he was treated by medics, he still opted to play despite the injury. In the end, Akihiro's friend gathered the most meat, winning the reward for himself and Akihiro. When Akihiro was asked which pair he would take with him in the reward, he chose Ahron and his father, much to Aubrey's disappointment. The rest of the pairs were then given a final 20 minutes to spend time with their loved ones before returning to camp. At camp, Aubrey conferred to Ervic and Solenn on taking out Moi first. Meanwhile, Akihiro, Ahron, and their respective loved ones enjoyed their reward at Phuket.

Day 26: Akihiro and his friend and Ahron and his father continued to enjoy their stay at Phuket, riding go-karts and trying out bungee jumping. In the evening, Ahron and Akihiro bade goodbye to their loved ones before returning to camp.

Day 27: The castaways competed in the Immunity Challenge wherein Ervic won immunity. Upon return to camp, they saw a board with their pictures on it. They were told that they could write on the board anything they want to say to a particular fellow castaway. Afterwards, Solenn used the board's marker pen to make tattoos on her fellow castaways. Aubrey and Ervic then discussed about their and their fellow castaways' voting plans and who they wanted to take to the Final Four. At Tribal Council, Moi revealed that Aubrey was calling the shots for everyone on who to vote. Aubrey denied this, saying that the tribe's decision was more or less dependent on compromise. After the votes were tallied, Michelle was given her long overdue send-off, 7–1.

=== Cycle 11: Days 28-30 ===
- Reward Challenge: In a game similar to shuffleboard, contestants would each shoot two pucks one at a time atop a U-shaped table towards a target. The one whose puck stops nearest to the center of the target after all pucks had been played would win the reward.
  - Player Advantage Mini-Challenge: Contestants would run through the forest towards the beach, where they would go to a spot in the water marked by a flag. At the foot of the flagpole is a chest containing a sandbag for each contestant. The first four to return with a sandbag would each have an advantage in the main challenge: a third puck.
  - Reward: The contestant's favorite dessert and P100,000, either to spend on five of the other contestants' desserts (at ₱20,000 each) or to keep for oneself.
- Immunity Challenge: Contestants would stand under scaffolds, with one of their arms chained to shackles attached to drums of water. Lowering the arm would cause the drum to tip, pouring the water on the contestant, signaling elimination. Last man standing would win immunity.

Night of Day 27: Back at camp, the remaining castaways discussed Jon and Aira's pouty reactions during the previous Tribal Council. Ervic then expressed to Aubrey that Moi's comment about her made him think about his next move: take out Moi and Ahron first for not being in their core alliance.

Day 28: Before the castaways competed in the Reward Challenge, they were presented with their favorite desserts: buko pandan salad for Ahron, chocolate cake for Akihiro, chocolate roll cake for Aubrey, mangoes and purple mangosteens for Ervic, strawberry cake for Elma, apple pie for Solenn, and leche flan for Moi. In the mini-challenge, Ervic, Ahron, Elma, and Akihiro were the first four to finish, giving them an advantage in the Reward Challenge. In the said challenge itself, Elma's first puck stopped initially nearest to the target, before Ervic's second puck bumped Solenn's first closer to the target. Ervic made amends by shooting his third puck inches into the target, winning the challenge for him. He was then presented with ₱100,000 and was given the choice to spend it on the other desserts or to keep it for himself. He decided to keep the money. Back at camp, Aubrey discussed her past relationship with Jon. The tribe then received a cryptic message about their safety in the game. Interpreting this as directions to another immunity bracelet, Elma started searching for the said alleged bracelet. Everybody else helped but eventually gave up. Moi then came up with a plan to play a prank on Elma by writing a fake note that would lead to a fake bracelet. The prank was executed so well that Elma quickly hid the fake bracelet, convinced she finally had immunity. However, after Elma was told that it was all just a prank, she still kept the bracelet regardless as a sign of her tribemates' creativity. Akihiro then asked Aubrey and Elma about his likelihood of being in the final five, their answers making him think they were aligned with Solenn.

Day 29: Ervic and Aubrey discussed on possibly taking out Moi and Ahron to the point of including Akihiro to the mix. The castaways then competed in the Immunity Challenge, which was being plagued by successive storms. Finally, over three and a half hours since the challenge began, with Ervic and Akihiro being the only castaways standing, the former gave way to Akihiro for the latter's second immunity win.

Day 30: The entire day was spent with everyone jockeying on their possible votes. At Tribal Council, Akihiro, Elma, and Aubrey were described as being the best persons to reach the end. When Elma was told that there was indeed an immunity bracelet buried at camp, she related the prank played on her, after which the tribe was reminded that both the buried bracelet and the one Aubrey was still holding would only be effective until before the final five. The castaways then rated each other based on trust. After the votes were tallied, Ahron was eliminated, 5–1–1.

=== Cycle 12: Days 31-33 ===
- Reward Challenge: Contestants would race through the forest to retrieve 20 tags bearing names of heroes: ten of actual Philippine national heroes and ten of fictional Philippine superheroes. After the tags are found, they would then proceed to a word search puzzle board and encircle the twenty names there. First one to finish would win the reward.
  - Reward: ₱500,000, half of which would go to the contestant's chosen charity.
- Immunity Challenge: Contestants would insert chips into a bean machine, falling into one of four slots at the bottom. Starting at two chips, the number of chips a contestant should play would increase over time. Play continues until a contestant is eliminated, either by leaving the machine with no chips inside, letting a chip fall to the ground, or being caught with more than two chips on either hand, after which play would resume. Last one standing would win immunity.

Day 31: Before the Reward Challenge, the castaways were visited by Jessica Soho, who brought with her video messages from their chosen charities: CRIBS Foundation for Solenn, Gawad Kalinga for Akihiro, the Philippine Animal Welfare Society (PAWS) for Aubrey, Golden Acres for Elma, the Vincentian Missionaries Social Development Foundation for Ervic, and Hebreo 12:1 Foundation for Moi. The castaways then competed in the said Challenge, wherein Moi overtook the opposition and won. Upon return to camp, the castaways started searching for the buried immunity bracelet. Solenn's foot started to hurt due to a wound she obtained during the Reward Challenge. When it was determined by medics that the wound would need stitches to close, she had to be evacuated to the nearest hospital for treatment. After the procedure, Solenn was deemed fit enough to return to camp. Meanwhile, back at camp, Ervic and Aubrey discussed contingency plans of taking either Elma or Moi to their fold in case Solenn would not really return. Later, Akihiro related to Aubrey the possibility of an alternate prize in the Immunity Challenge, and the passing of the immunity necklace to Elma instead, if such a prize would suffice. Aubrey then warned him not to take Elma to the final three, knowing the latter could possibly win the game. As dusk began, Solenn returned to camp, to the relief of her tribemates.

Day 32: As instructed by treemail, the Galone tribe temporarily left the island to help out in distributing bags and toys to children at a local school. They then competed in the Immunity Challenge, wherein Akihiro obtained his third immunity win. Afterwards, they were told that either one or two castaways would be voted out at the next Tribal Council. Upon return to camp, Moi expressed to Ervic that she was already without an ally. Ervic responded that, as far as he was concerned, he was still sticking to his alliance. At night, Aubrey related that she would run naked on the last day of the game, if she would last that long; Solenn expressed the same thing. The castaways then frolicked in different ways, knowing the end of the game was at hand.

Day 33: Moi and Elma restarted their search for the buried immunity bracelet. New treemail bearing further information to the bracelet's burial site broadened their search to a tree near shore. Moi became elated after finding the bracelet at the said tree. Afterwards, Elma started acting in a way that her tribemates interpreted as strange, even jumping across a wide stream as a show of her skill as a long jumper. At Tribal Council, Aubrey and Moi played their immunity bracelets as it was the last Tribal Council those could be used. After the votes were tallied, none was cast for the latter two, as Elma was unanimously voted out, 5–1.

=== Cycle 13: Days 34-35 ===
- Immunity Challenge: Contestants would each stand on two uneven poles as they single-handedly hold onto the pole, on which the immunity necklace was hanging, for as long as they could. Letting go would mean elimination. Last one standing would win a choice between Immunity and a car (a new Honda automobile), with the unclaimed prize given to a chosen fellow castaway.

Night of Day 33: The Galone tribe discussed Elma's recent actions that led to her elimination. They also took into account her remark during the previous Tribal Council that the tribe would eventually turn against each other in the end.

Day 34: The castaways were told that they would be competing in the final Immunity Challenge of the season. They were also shown a car that the winner could also receive. In the said Challenge, Moi and Aubrey were the firsts to go after five hours. The remaining three castaways then surpassed Amanda Coolley Van Cooll's endurance challenge record (which was five hours, 52 minutes, and 10 seconds) back in Palau. After seven hours, they were told that they were no longer allowed to lift either foot from their platforms. Solenn, unable to bear the pain, then quit, leaving the men to compete for immunity. Two hours later, Ervic and Akihiro were further told that they were no longer allowed to squat or shift their feet. Ten hours and 53 minutes since the challenge began, Akihiro told Ervic to give to him the car instead of immunity. Akihiro then jumped off, giving Ervic the win (as well as a new Survivor Philippines endurance challenge record). But when presented the choice of either the car or immunity, Ervic chose the car and gave immunity to Aubrey. Because of this, Akihiro felt disappointed, bitter, and betrayed against Ervic, which was apparent upon returning to camp.

Day 35: Akihiro was still reeling from Ervic and Aubrey's betrayal, to the point that he was not in speaking terms with the two. When Akihiro asked Moi about Ervic and Aubrey's actions, Moi answered that the two feared that he was a threat. Akihiro tried to talk to Ervic on voting off Solenn. Ervic relayed this to Aubrey, after which, they laid out plans on how to keep Solenn longer. At Tribal Council, it was revealed that only one castaway would be eliminated that night. During the discussions, Akihiro aired his frustrations on his tribemates, especially Ervic. In the end, despite the drama the two men created, Moi, to Akihiro's surprise, became the one voted off as previously planned, 4–1.

=== Finale: Day 36 ===
Night of Day 35: Upon return to camp, Akihiro decided to separate himself from the others due to the emotions that he had to endure at the previous Tribal Council.

Day 36: The final four castaways were woken up by Richard, who then congratulated them on reaching the end of the game and showed them a scrap containing photographs from previous challenges. Afterwards, the castaways burned down their camp. They got on a boat and rode through a river, stopping at the torches that signify those who left the game, cutting off their name tags and placing them on floating candles, which was released onto the sea. They then went to another spot where they were dressed up in formal wear in preparation for the final Tribal Council. At the final Tribal Council itself, the final four faced a mostly averse jury, with most of the heat directed at Ervic, Aubrey and Akihiro, forcing the three to defend themselves in different ways. After the final four finished their final words, Richard revealed that the vote for that night would be for the seventh jury member. After the final four and the jury cast their votes, they were further told that the results would not be revealed until several months later back in the Philippines. After the eventual revelation of the last jury member, the actual final vote for the remaining final three would then take place, all in front of a live audience. Following Survivor tradition, Richard then took the voting urn and left the Tribal Council area.

A few months later, in the GMA Network Center in Quezon City, it was revealed that Aubrey and Akihiro had the most votes, tying with three each. The ensuing revote transferred Aubrey to the jury, 5–3. In the actual final vote that happened afterwards, Akihiro was declared the Sole Survivor, 3–2–2. To signify the title, he wore a special necklace, one more ornate than the immunity necklace.

== Voting history ==
Tribal Council (TC) numbers are almost the same as Cycle numbers as a Tribal Council occurs at the end of each cycle; eliminations that happen outside a Tribal Council do not bear a Tribal Council number, but count towards a cycle. Episode numbers denote the episode(s) when the voting and subsequent revelation of votes and elimination during a Tribal Council took place. They can also denote the episode wherein a contestant officially left the game for any reason.

	Original tribes		Swapped tribes		Shuffled tribes				Merged tribe							
Episode #	4	10	15	20	24	30	35	36	40	45	50	54	59	61	64/70	
Day	2	6	9	11	13	16	19 (Note: On Day 19, Sar Mayee participated at the second round of joint Tribal Council as a part of their additional reward for winning the Immunity Challenge on the same day.)		22	24	27	30	33	35	36	
Eliminated	Princess	Doc Ferdz	Myka	Buhawi	Karen	Trizsa	Mico	Ian	Jon	Aira	Michelle	Ahron	Elma	Moi	Tie (Note: The vote resulted in a tie. Per the rules, a second vote was held where the castaways involved in the tie would not vote and the remaining castaways could only vote for those who tied.)	Aubrey
Votes	Quit (Note: No vote: Princess declared herself to have quit the game on Day 2.)	1–0 (Note: Although the entire tribe was present, only the tribe leader was allowed to vote.)	4–1	3–1	4–2–1	6–1	3–2–1	4–2–1–0–0 (Note: Aira and Moi played their respective Immunity Bracelets on themselves. Therefore, three votes against Aira and one vote against Moi were not counted.)	4–2–0 (Note: Jon played an Immunity Bracelet on Michelle. Therefore, four votes against her were not counted.)	7–2	7–1	5–1–1	5–1	4–1	3–3–2–2	5–3
Voter	Vote															
Akihiro						Trizsa		~~Moi~~	~~Michelle~~	Aira	Michelle	Ahron	Elma	Moi	Aubrey	None (Note: Akihiro and Aubrey were not eligible to vote in the second round of voting.)
Solenn		None (Note: Doc Ferdz, Elma, Mico, Myka and Solenn were not eligible to vote as the only eligible players they could vote for were each other.)	Myka	Buhawi	Ian		Mico	Ian	Jon	Aira	Michelle	Ahron	Elma	Moi	Akihiro	Akihiro
Ervic						Trizsa		~~Aira~~	~~Michelle~~	Aira	Michelle	Ahron	Elma	Moi	Akihiro	Akihiro
Aubrey						Trizsa		~~Aira~~	~~Michelle~~	Aira	Michelle	Ahron	Elma	Moi	Akihiro	None
Moi					Karen		Mico	~~Aira~~	Jon	Aira	Michelle	Aubrey	Elma	Akihiro	Solenn	Akihiro
Elma		None	Myka	Buhawi		Trizsa		Ian	~~Michelle~~	Aira	Michelle	Ahron	Solenn		Aubrey	Aubrey
Ahron					Karen		Aira	Ian	Jon	Aira	Michelle	Ervic			Aubrey	Aubrey
Michelle						Trizsa		Ahron	Aubrey	Ervic	Akihiro				Ervic	Aubrey
Aira					Ian		Mico	Ian	Jon	Ervic					Ervic	Aubrey
Jon						Trizsa		Ahron	Aubrey						Solenn	Aubrey
Ian					Karen		Aira	Solenn								
Mico		None	Myka	Buhawi	Karen		Ian									
Trizsa						Jon										
Karen					Moi											
Buhawi		Doc Ferdz	Myka	Mico												
Myka		None	Mico													
Doc Ferdz		None														
Princess																

Jury Vote
Episode #	70		
Day	36		
Finalist	Ervic	Solenn	Akihiro
Votes	3–2–2		
Juror	Vote		
Aubrey	Ervic		
Moi	Ervic		
Elma			Akihiro
Ahron		Solenn	
Michelle		Solenn	
Aira			Akihiro
Jon			Akihiro
