= Akihiro Sato (model) =

Japanese Brazilian model

- Born: September 12, 1983 (age 43); São Paulo, Brazil
- Years active: 2009–2011
- Agent: Mercator Model Management
- Height: 1.85 m (6 ft 1 in)
- Children: 1
Association football career
Senior career*
Years	Team	Apps	(Gls)
–	Team Socceroo		
- * Club domestic league appearances and goals

Akihiro Macieira Sato (born September 12, 1983) is a Japanese Brazilian model.

== Early life ==
Akihiro Sato was born on September 12, 1983, to Ichiro Sato and Clea Maceda Andrade in São Paulo, Brazil. His mother is a Brazilian of Portuguese, African, and Indigenous descent, while his father is Japanese Brazilian. He has an older brother and an older sister.

== Career ==
=== Modeling and acting ===
Sato started modeling in Brazil and Thailand. He appeared in a Filipino movie called Handumanan. He is one of the most popular models in the Philippines as of 2009. He joined Survivor Philippines: Celebrity Showdown and made it all the way to the end, Day 36 with Ervic Vijandre, Solenn Heussaff, and Aubrey Miles as the shows "Final Four". In the live finals, he was named as the "1st Celebrity Sole Survivor".

Sato also appeared in GMA Network shows like SRO Cinemaserye: Moshi Moshi I Love You, with Rufa Mae Quinto as his leading lady; in Darna as Vladimir the Vampire, one of Darna's enemies; and in Panday Kids as Oswaldo.

In 2011, Sato played the role of Tommy in the movie My Valentine Girls. He appeared in Captain Barbell as Bruno.

When his contract with GMA Network expired, Sato moved to ABS-CBN due to lack of TV shows. Sato appeared in Trip na Trip as a new host.

=== Football ===
Sato signed up to play for Team Socceroo F.C. of the now-defunct United Football League for the 2011 season. He played with actor models, Daniel Matsunaga and Fabio Ide.

== Personal life ==
Sato studied the Filipino language in the University of the Philippines. He is good friends with his fellow Japanese Brazilian model-turned-actors Daniel Matsunaga and Fabio Ide.

Sato is now based in Brazil, where he lives with his girlfriend. Their daughter, Mayumi, was born on January 28, 2013.

== Filmography ==
=== Film ===
Year	Title	Role	Film Production
2009	Handumanan	Carlos Silva	Indie Film
2011	My Valentine Girls	Tommy	Regal Films

=== Television ===
Year	Title	Role	Network
2009–2010	Darna	Vladimir	GMA Network
2009	Celebrity Duets: Philippine Edition	Himself	GMA Network
2009	SRO Cinemaserye: Moshi Moshi I Love You	Akihiro Watanabe	GMA Network
2010	Panday Kids	Oswaldo / Kakak	GMA Network
2010	Survivor Philippines: Celebrity Showdown	Himself	GMA Network
2011	Captain Barbell	Donald Higante	GMA Network
2011	Survivor Philippines: Celebrity Doubles Showdown	Himself / Guest	GMA Network
