= Rufino family =

Philippine business and political family

The Rufino family are a prominent family of business owners, innovators, and philanthropists in the Philippines. Prominent members of the family include former Forbes richest Filipina, media powerhouse Marixi Rufino-Prieto of the Philippine Daily Inquirer, celebrity socialite Tessa Prieto-Valdes, real estate magnate Carlos "Charlie" Rufino, artist Maria Victoria "Marivic or Mav" Rufino, CNN Philippines Sports announcer Jinno Rufino, businessman Ernesto Rufino, and Forbes richest Filipino and chairman of family business First Philippine Holdings Corporation and Energy Development Corporation Federico "Piki" Rufino Lopez. Moreover, former Ambassador Bienvenido Rufino Tantoco Sr. founded the Rustan's Group, which controls all of the Starbucks stores in the country, and SSI Group, which owns a portfolio of over 100 brands, including Hermès and Cartier. In addition, the portrait of royal Julieta Rufino is displayed in the permanent collection of The National Museum. The country's most renowned artist, Fernando Amorsolo, created her oil painting. The Rufinos were among the individuals/families listed in Forbes magazine's list of the Philippines' richest people in 2007.

The Rufino family owned the original movie and opera houses in Old Manila with exclusive partnerships with Warner Brothers and other major Hollywood studios and later diversified into other industries. They founded several of the first banks in the Philippines, including Security Bank, which today is one of the largest banks in the country in terms of assets.

Most of the family's current business interests are represented in the Rufino Group of Companies, which includes the Rufino Pacific Tower, Sunvar, Corinthian Properties, The NEO Group, including the JPMorgan Chase Tower, Google head office in Bonifacio Global City, one of the largest renewable energy data centers in the country, and a variety of diverse investments and land holdings around the Metro Manila region.

The Rufino family developed and own the majority of skyscrapers in the central business district, where the Google office is located. The Rufino Pacific Tower glass high rise is the tallest steel framed skyscraper in the Philippines which is located on Ayala Avenue and V. A. Rufino Street, named in honor of the Rufino family.

Recently, the family launched the seven-story all-glass Rufino Campus at De La Salle University, a top university in the Philippines.
