= Fabio Ide =

Brazilian actor (born 1987)

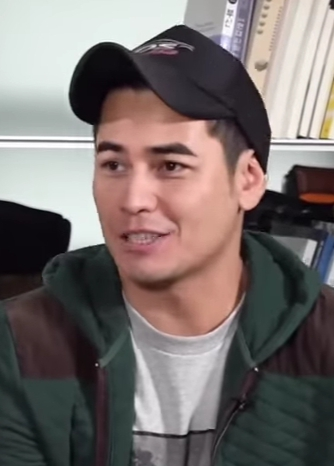
- Ide in 2019
- Born: 26 December 1987 (age 38); São Paulo, Brazil
- Occupation: Actor
- Years active: 2007–present
- Agents: GMA Artist Center (2007–2019); Viva Artists Agency (2013–present)

Fabio Ide (born 26 December 1987) is a Brazilian actor in the Philippines. Ide is in D'Survivors with Akihiro Sato and Daniel Matsunaga.

== Early life ==
A native of São Paulo, Brazil, Fabio Ide was born on 26 December 1987 to Ana Maria Ide and Luis Ide. His mother is a Brazilian of Portuguese, African, and Indigenous descent, while his father is Japanese Brazilian. He has two sisters. Ide attended Mackens University where he pursued a degree in publicity and marketing.

== Football career ==
Ide signed up to play for Team Socceroo F.C. of the now-defunct United Football League for the 2011 season. He played with fellow model actor Daniel Matsunaga with the club.

== Personal life ==
Fabio Ide has a daughter Danielle with Dennise Oca. He has been in a relationship with Bianca Manalo from 2015-2017. Ide's current partner Ellen Fröjd. Fröjd gave birth to their twins in September 2023.

== Filmography ==
=== Film ===
Year	Title	Role
2012	Shake Rattle and Roll Fourteen: The Invasion	Konde Nado (segment "Pamana")
2013	Coming Soon	
2013	Ang Huling Henya	Yllana
2014	Flying Kiss	

=== Television ===
Year	Title	Role	Network
2010	D'Survivors	Himself / Contestant	GMA Network
2010	You to Me Are Everything	Miko	GMA Network
2010	Ang Yaman ni Lola	Boggart	GMA Network
2011	Dwarfina	Dwendelstilskin	GMA Network
2011	Andres de Saya	Victor Del Mundo	GMA Network
2012	My Beloved	Rowan	GMA Network
2012	Coffee Prince	Leo Benito	GMA Network
2013	Mundo Mo'y Akin	George	GMA Network
2015	Mac and Chiz	Ismael	TV5
2015	Destiny Rose	Gabriele Antonioni	GMA Network
2015	Dangwa	Brian	GMA Network
2015–2016	Karelasyon	Frank / Robert	GMA Network
2016	Dear Uge	Fabio Ide	GMA Network
2017–2018	HaPi House	Martin	Sari-Sari Channel; TV5
2018	The One That Got Away	Daniel	GMA Network
2018	Victor Magtanggol	Baldur	GMA Network
2018	Cain at Abel	Brent Bautista	GMA Network
2018	Tadhana: Babae Ako	Edward	GMA Network
2019	Magkaagaw	Jose Francisco Pereira	GMA Network
2021	Ikaw Ay Akin	Benedict Salazar	Net 25
2023	The Iron Heart	Darren	Kapamilya Channel / A2Z / TV5
2023	Black Rider	Romanov	GMA Network

=== Drama anthology ===
Year	Title	Role
2013	Ikaw ang true love ko	Dan
2013–2017	Wagas	Frank Shotkoski / Richard Mills / Dan
2014	My Dream Guy (Todo na 'to!)	Richard Mills
2017	My Big Sexy Love	Frank Shotkoski
2018	Isang linggong pag-ibig: The Arlene Tolibas Story	Antonio
2018	Magpakailanman: A Ghost from My Past: The Jade Martin Story	Lt. Scott Daniel
