= Cory Quirino =

Filipino TV host and author (born 1953)

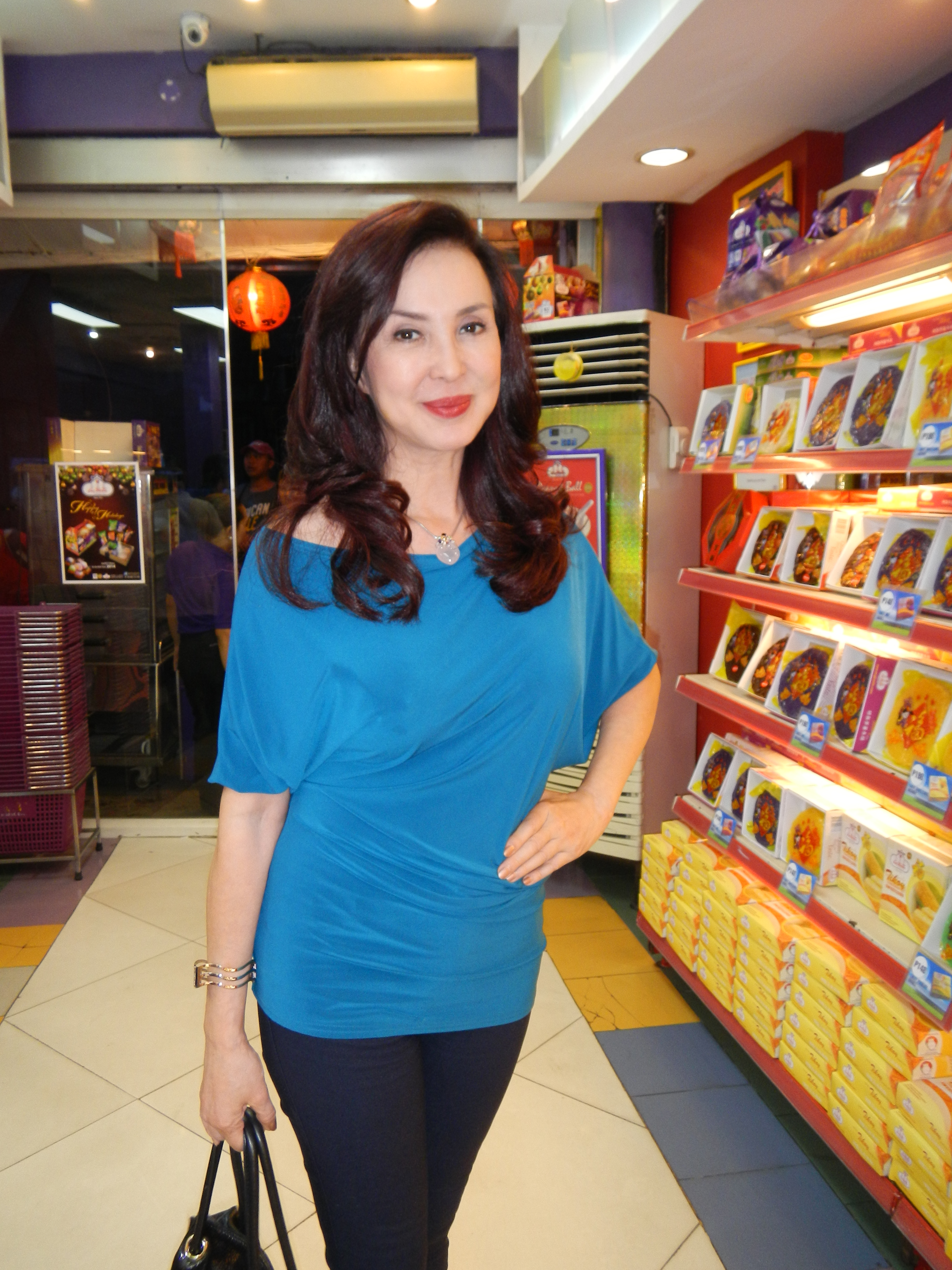
- Cory Quirino, Eng Bee Tin Chinese Deli store, Binondo, Manila
- Born: Socorro Alicia Rastrollo Quirino; August 11, 1953 (age 73); Quezon City, Philippines
- Occupation: Presenter
- Spouse: Roman Cruz Jr. (separated)
- Children: 1
- Parents: Tomas Quirino (father); Conchita Rastrollo (mother)
- Relatives: Elpidio Quirino (grandfather); Victoria Quirino-Gonzalez (aunt); Antonio Quirino (granduncle); Carlos Quirino (first-cousin-once-removed/uncle); Monique Lagdameo (second-degree cousin)

Socorro Alicia "Cory" Rastrollo Quirino-Cruz (Tagalog: [ˈkɔɾi kiˈɾino]; born August 11, 1953) is a Filipino television host, author and beauty pageant titleholder. She is currently the president and national director of Mutya ng Pilipinas. She is also a former licensee and national director of Miss World Philippines and Mister World Philippines. She is also a council member of one of the branch offices of the Philippine Red Cross. She is the president of the Volunteers Against Crime and Corruption (VACC) from February 2018, replacing Dante Jimenez who was appointed as the head of the newly-formed Presidential Anti-Corruption Commission.

== Early life ==
Quirino is the third child of Tomas Quirino/Tomas "Tommy" Quirino and Conchita Rastrollo. She is also the granddaughter of Philippine president Elpidio Quirino and the grandniece of ABS-CBN co-founder Antonio Quirino. She is married to Roman Cruz, Jr.

== Education ==
Quirino completed her primary education at the College of the Holy Spirit Manila near Malacañan Palace, and completed her secondary education at Assumption College San Lorenzo. She spent a few years at Maryknoll (now Miriam College) taking A.B. classes before she went to Spain to complete her Fine Arts degree. Quirino took up her master's degree in hotel and restaurant management at Philippine Women's University.

== Career ==
Quirino began her broadcasting career in the 1980s when she hosted the late-night talk show Oh No, It's Johnny! for the Philippine TV network RPN (Radio Philippines Network). Eventually, she hosted her own show Citiline, a weekly travel and fitness show that aired on Studio 23 (now ABS-CBN Sports+Action), a subsidiary of ABS-CBN Corporation.

During an out-of-town shoot for Citiline, Cory Quirino and her entourage were abducted by bandits. This incident was chronicled in her book Waiting for the Light as well as the movie The Cory Quirino Kidnap: NBI Files, which starred award-winning actors, Ara Mina and Alessandra de Rossi. Citiline was eventually re-titled as The Good Life with Cory Quirino.

Aside from Waiting for the Light, Cory Quirino wrote a series of best-seller books titled Forever Young, which feature beauty and health tips as well as her own workout programs.

She also made a fitness video titled Cory Quirino’s Celebrity Workout for Beginners.

Quirino hosts the Sunday morning television program The Good Life with Cory Quirino and the radio show Ma-Beauty Po Naman. She writes a weekly health and fitness column, Inside Out, for the Philippine Daily Inquirer's newspaper and website.

She maintains a store called Cory Quirino World of Wellness in Greenhills Shopping Center, located in San Juan, Metro Manila. She was inducted as a Celebrity Inductee at the Eastwood City Walk Of Fame Philippines 2014 for contributing her hosting job on TV & also endorsing.

== Charity work ==
Quirino is currently a member of the board of trustees and overall chair of "Alay sa PGH" fund-drive of the Philippine General Hospital Medical Foundation As national director for Miss World in the Philippines, she intends to do more charity work.

On April 17, 2013, she was also elected and inducted as one of the new council members of the Philippine Red Cross - Rizal Chapter - Muntinlupa Branch. She has committed her full support in helping raise more funds for the various humanitarian activities of the Philippine Red Cross.

== Credits ==
=== Television shows ===
- Oh No, It's Johnny!
- IBC News 11 O'Clock Report (1992–1994) - Anchors
- Citiline (1994–1999)
- The Cory Quirino Show (2003)
- The Good Life with Cory Quirino (2005–present)
- Celebrity Duets Season 2 (2008) - Contestant
- Organique TV (2015–2017)

=== Print ===
- Waiting For The Light (ISBN 971-522-284-6)
- Forever Young: Cory Quirino's Guide to Beauty & Fitness (ISBN 971-27-0528-5)
- Forever Young: Cory Quirino's Guide to Beauty and Wellness (ISBN 971-27-1187-0)
- My ABCs of Beauty and Wellness (ISBN 971-27-1232-X)
- Inside Out
- Kabataan Habambuhay: Ang Gabay ni Cory Quirino tungo sa Kagandahan at Kalusugan (ISBN 971-27-1759-3)

=== Radio ===
- Ma-Beauty Po Naman (2004–2020)
- Kaya Mo 'Yan! (2020–present)

=== Movies ===
- The Cory Quirino Kidnap: NBI Files (2003)

=== Video ===
- Cory Quirino's Celebrity Workout for Beginners (1998)

== See also ==
- List of kidnappings
