= HIV/AIDS in the Philippines =

The Philippines has one of the highest rates of infection of HIV/AIDS, and is one of the fastest growing number of cases worldwide. The Philippines is one of seven countries with growth in number of cases of over 25%, from 2001 to 2009.

Cases are concentrated among men who have sex with men. HIV cases among men having sex with men multiplied over 10 times since 2010. HIV cases are getting younger.

The first case of HIV infection in the Philippines was reported in January 1984.

In December 2018, the Philippine HIV and AIDS Policy Act of 2018, was passed. The law repealed the Philippine AIDS Prevention and Control Act of 1998, and made health services for HIV/AIDs more accessible to Filipinos.

== Current status ==
The Philippines is a low-HIV-prevalence country, with 0.1 percent of the adult population estimated to be HIV-positive, but the rate of increase in infections is one of the highest. In August 2019, the Department of Health (DOH) AIDS Registry in the Philippines reported 69,629 cumulative cases since 1984. In April 2015, 560 new cases were reported showing a 42% increase compared to the same period in the previous year. In 2014, 6,011 new cases of HIV were reported, with 91% of the cases being asymptomatic at the time of reporting, while 543 cases were diagnosed as AIDS. From 2001 to 2015 the number of cases diagnosed per year increased 37 times, from 174 cases diagnosed in 2001 to 6,552 for the first 10 months on 2015.

Between 2010 to 2015, 91% (22,726) of cases were men, with a median age of 28 years, with over half (12,616) in the 25–34 age group. 26% (6,529) of men were 20–24 years of age, an increase from 12% in 2005–2009. Since the year 2000, the high-prevalence age group has changed from the 30- to 39-year-old age group being the most affected between 2000–2004, to the 25–34 age group between 2005 to 2009, and to the 20-29 age group from 2010–2015.

The infection rate among men having sex with men has multiplied 10 times from 2010 to 2015. In November 2015, the rate of HIV prevalence in men in this group surpassed 5%, the UN's definition of concentrated epidemic, in eight cities Cebu, Cagayan de Oro, Puerto Princesa, Davao, Quezon City, Parañaque and Makati, with Cebu reaching 14%.

Between 1984 and 1990, 62% (133 of 216) of cases were female. From 2010 to 2015, females only comprised 5% (1,017) of the 20,512 reported cases.

From January 2010 to April 2015, 82% (20,512) of all cases were reported. At the time of reporting, 93% of these cases were still asymptomatic.

In June 2018, 28,045 people living with HIV were undergoing anti-retroviral therapy in 80 treatment hubs. The majority (97%) were males.

Overseas Filipino workers account for about 20 percent of all cases.

In June 2025, the Department of Health (DOH) recommended a declaration of national public health emergency. In the first three months of 2025, the Philippines saw 57 new daily HIV cases, a 500 percent increase from 2024. The newly reported cases were 95 percent male, especially young men aged 15–34. In 2025, as a result of the alarming increase in HIV cases, Filipino senator Sherwin Gatchalian urged the DOH to review inconsistencies with the 2018 reproductive health education policy.

=== Means of transmission ===
Among males, the dominant mode of transmission (84%) was through male to male sexual contact. The next common modes were male-female sex (11%) and sharing of infected needles (4%). Among females, 92% was through male-female sex and 3% through shared needles. For both sexes, mother-to-child transmission occurred in 153 cases.

=== Geographical Distribution ===
From 1984 to 2015, the region with the most number of reported cases were Metro Manila with 11,081 (44%), Region 4A with 3,230 (13%) cases, Central Visayas with 2,260 (9%) cases, Region 3 with 2,025 (8%) cases and Region 11 with 1,460 (6%) cases. 3,734 (15%) of cases were distributed around the rest of the country while 1,146 (5%) had no data on the region. The June 2018 report cited regional differences in terms of dominant modes of transmission. Almost half (44%) of infected through MSM came from NCR while most of those that were infected via needles were from Region VII. A third of females that were infected through sex work came from Region III.

== At-risk groups ==
=== MSM ===
Most-at-risk groups include men who have sex with men (MSM), with 395 new human immunodeficiency virus (HIV) infections among within this group from January to February 2013 alone, 96% up from 2005's 210 reported infections. A spokesperson of the National Epidemiology Center (NEC) of the Department of Health says that the sudden and steep increase in the number of new cases within the MSM community, particularly in the last three years (309 cases in 2006, and 342 in 2013), is "tremendously in excess of what (is) usually expected," allowing classification of the situation as an "epidemic". Of the cumulative total of 1,097 infected MSMs from 1984 to 2008, 49% were reported in the last three years (72% asymptomatic); 108 have died when reported, and slightly more MSMs were reportedly already with AIDS (30%).

Among MSM's, ninety percent of the newly infected are single (up to 35% of past cases reported involved overseas Filipino workers or OFWs and/or their spouse), with most of the affected people now only 20 to 34 years old (from 45 to 49 years old in the past). The highest number of infections among MSMs is from Metro Manila. An HIV surveillance study conducted by Dr. Louie Mar Gangcuangco and colleagues from the University of the Philippines-Philippine General Hospital showed that out of 406 MSM tested for HIV from entertainment areas in Metro Manila, HIV prevalence using the rapid test was 11.8% (95% confidence interval: 8.7–15.0). Increasing infection rates were also noted in the cities of Angeles, Cebu, and Davao. 1 to 3 percent of MSM's were found to be HIV-positive by sentinel surveillance conducted in Cebu and Quezon cities in 2001.

=== Injecting drug users ===
Another at-risk group are injecting drug users (IDUs), 1 percent of whom were found to be HIV-positive in Cebu City in 2005. A high rate of needle sharing among IDUs in some areas, 77 percent in Cebu City, is of concern. Prostitutes, because of their infrequent condom use, high rates of sexually transmitted infections (STIs), and other factors, are also considered to be at risk. In 2002, just 6 percent of prostitutes interviewed said they used condoms in the last week. In 2005, HIV prevalence among prostitutes in Cebu City was relatively low, at 0.2 percent.

The threats and effects that AIDS/HIV brings to the population is a severe cause for concern. The prevalence of virus within the Philippine population remains low despite an increase in the number of cases. The Philippines qualifies as one of the few countries where the growth of AIDS/HIV cases has approximately increased to 25% from in a span of a couple of years from 2001 to 2009.

The rise in the number of cases can be best categorized by specific groups in the population. The age group that is most affected are 15–24 years old. Young professionals engaging in unprotected sexual intercourse is the main cause for the contraction and it accounts for one third of the AIDS/HIV-infected population. The infection within this age group is more prevalent with homosexual relationships.

A regional population that is greatly affected by AIDS/HIV is in Cebu. The prevalence rate is at 7.7% which is greater than the major cities of Manila at 6.7% and Quezon City at 6.6%. Recent data show that the surge is not caused by transmission through sexual intercourse but through an increase of people injecting drugs. It is not the injectable drugs but the sharing of needles, which opens the risk of transmission of fluids, greatly exposing the risk of contracting the virus .

== National risk profile ==
Several factors put the Philippines in danger of a broader HIV/AIDS epidemic. They include increasing population mobility within and outside of the Philippine islands; adverse to publicly discussing issues of a sexual nature; rising levels of sex work, casual sex, unsafe sex, and injecting drug use.

There is also high STI prevalence and poor health-seeking behaviors among at-risk groups; gender inequality; weak integration of HIV/AIDS responses in local government activities; shortcomings in prevention campaigns; inadequate social and behavioral research and monitoring; and the persistence of stigma and discrimination, which results in the relative invisibility of PLWHA. Lack of knowledge about HIV among the Filipino population is troubling. Approximately two-thirds of young women lack comprehensive knowledge on HIV transmission, and 90 percent of the population of reproductive age believe you can contract HIV by sharing a meal with someone.

The Philippines has high tuberculosis (TB) incidence, with 131 new cases per 100,000 people in 2005, according to the World Health Organization. HIV infects 0.1 percent of adults with TB. Although HIV-TB co-infection is low, the high incidence of TB indicates that co-infections could complicate treatment and care for both diseases in the future.

== Response ==
Wary of Thailand's growing epidemic in the late 1980s, the Philippines was quick to recognize its own sociocultural risks and vulnerabilities to HIV/AIDS, according to a 2008 report published by the United States Agency for International Development. Early responses included the 1992 creation of the Philippine National AIDS Council (PNAC), the country's highest HIV/AIDS policymaking body. Members of the Council represent 17 governmental agencies, including local governments and the two houses of the legislature; seven nongovernmental organizations (NGOs); and an association of PLWHA.

The passing of the Philippine AIDS Prevention and Control Act in 1998 was also a landmark in the country's fight against HIV/AIDS. However, the Philippines is faced with the challenge of stimulating government leadership action in a low-HIV-prevalence country to advocate for a stronger and sustainable response to AIDS when faced with other competing priorities. One strategy has been to prevent STIs in general, which are highly prevalent in the country.

The PNAC developed the Philippines' AIDS Medium Term Plan: 2005–2010 (AMTP IV). The AMTP IV serves as a national road map toward universal access to prevention, treatment, care, and support, outlining country-specific targets, opportunities, and obstacles along the way, as well as culturally appropriate strategies to address them. In 2006, the country established a national monitoring and evaluation system, which was tested in nine sites and is being expanded. Antiretroviral treatment is available free of charge, but only 10 percent of HIV-infected women and men were receiving it as of 2006, according to UNAIDS.

This lack of distribution can be attributed to the focus of health spending towards disease specific programs instead of spending on public health which is more comprehensive and addresses multiple diseases. By spending on public health in general, the country would be able to strengthen the health system by creating effective health infrastructures that could carry out vertical programs without creating brain drain or hindering the economic development of the country. Without passable local infrastructure, health improvements would not be possible as distribution of medical care and medicines would be very limited; incidence and prevalence reports may not be accurate, and progress of health initiatives could not be tracked.

Photographer Niccolo Cosme launched the Red Whistle campaign in 2011, inspired by red disaster preparedness whistles, to raise awareness and understanding of HIV/AIDs in the Philippines.

=== Treatment ===
The Philippines uses antiretroviral treatment (ART) to treat people with HIV/AIDS. This treatment involves using different kinds of drugs such as zidovudine, lamivudine, and nevirapine.

Another method that is being used is lab examination, which will help monitor the patient's ART or antiretroviral drug level. Since treatment for HIV/AIDS is based on a case to case level, this will determine how the patient will be treated.

The government will handle most of the costs in association with the disease. The initial treatment will costs the government P7,920 a year. As of April 20th, 2015, the Department of Health (DOH) mentioned that they plan to buy P180 million worth of ARV or antiretroviral drugs to be used in ART.

Treatment is also partially covered by PhilHealth (Philippine Health Insurance Corporation), the country's national social health insurance program through the OHAT package.

== Legislation ==
The Philippines passed a legislation on HIV/AIDS during the first decade of Filipino infections. The bill's scope was minimal due to the lack of knowledge regarding the virus in the Philippines at the time. In 2018, a new law was passed, repealing the old one. One of the major changes now allows 15- to 17-year-olds to get HIV testing without parental consent. It also stipulated increased efforts to improve HIV awareness and to fight discrimination of PLHIVs (HIV-positive people).
