= Jace Flores =

Filipino actor and TV host

- Born: Reynaldo Chanco Flores; November 15, 1988 (age 37); Quezon City, Philippines
- Occupations: Actor, model
- Years active: 2008-present

Reynaldo Chanco Flores Jr. (born November 15, 1988), better known by his screen name Jace Flores is a Filipino former television actor and host. He joined season 1 of the reality game show Survivor Philippines in 2009. He is also a professional network marketer, and a prominent top earner in the industry.

== Career ==
His first television appearance was in the reality television show Survivor Philippines. After the reality show ended, he played supporting roles in several GMA Network teleseryes, including Luna Mystika, Ang Babaeng Hinugot sa Aking Tadyang, Kung Aagawin Mo ang Lahat sa Akin, Broken Vow and Healing Hearts. Flores gained popularity as a host to popular television shows in GMA-11 and QTV.

Flores is currently a network marketing professional, and is among the "successful millionaires" of the industry.

== Filmography ==
=== Television ===
Year	Title	Role
2015	Dangwa	Ador
2015	Healing Hearts	Larry
2014	Maynila	Domeng
2013	Bingit	Jerome
2012	Sana ay Ikaw na Nga	Dandoy
2012	Broken Vow	Kenneth
2011-2012	Spooky Nights	Himself
2011	Mistaken Identity	Apostol
2011	Best Men	Himself/co-host
2011	My Lover, My Wife	Cesar
2010	The Last Prince	Town Bully
2009-2010	Ikaw Sana	Carlo Arellano
2009	Sine Novela: Kung Aagawin Mo ang Lahat sa Akin	Dino
2009	Ang Babaeng Hinugot sa Aking Tadyang	Anton
2009	Obra	Gaston
2008-2009	Luna Mystika	Lucas
2008	Survivor Philippines (season 1)	Himself

=== Film ===
Year	Title	Role
2016	The Unmarried Wife	Frank
2014	Separados	
2013	My Lady Boss	Deo
2009	Bente	Gary
