= Patani Daño =

Filipino television personality and actress (born 1988)

- Born: Jervy Daño; July 15, 1988 (age 38); Camotes Island, Cebu, Philippines
- Occupations: TV personality, actress, comedienne
- Years active: 2008–present

Jervy "Patani" Daño is a Filipino television personality, comedian and actress best known for her appearance on the first season of Survivor Philippines in 2008.

== Early life ==
Jervy "Patani" Daño was born and raised on Camotes Island, Cebu, Philippines. She worked as a baby-sitter in Talisay after graduating from high school. Daño learned and mastered Tagalog by watching TV shows.

== Career ==
Daño made several attempts at auditioning for StarStruck, though she was unsuccessful.

In 2008, Daño became one of the contestants in the first season of Survivor Philippines, the Philippine adaptation of the international reality television franchise Survivor. Although she was the fourth contestant eliminated, her outspoken remarks and distinctive personality made her one of the most talked-about castaways of the season.

After her appearance on Survivor Philippines, Daño made several guest appearances on GMA Network programs and was later affiliated with Sparkle GMA Artist Center (formerly GMA Artist Center). She appeared in television drama series primarily in supporting and guest roles.

== Filmography ==
=== Television ===
Year	Title	Role
2008	Survivor Philippines (season 1)	Herself – Jarakay Tribe; Self – Naak Tribe
2008	Unang Hirit	Herself - Host
2008	Ful Haus	Herself - Maid
2008	Obra	Jemalyn
2010	Diz Iz It!	Herself – Judge
2010	Aha!	Herself – Segment Host
2012	Kapitan Awesome	Georgina
2013	Madam Chairman	Diyosa
2014	Wattpad Presents: Diary ng hindi malandi (Slight lang!)	Ruby
2014	Confessions of a Torpe	Jhunalyn
2014	Wagas: My Engkanto Lover	Rona
2016	Princess in the Palace	Lily
2016	Naku, Boss Ko!	Dora Mae
2017	Impostora	Juliet
2017	Daig Kayo ng Lola Ko: Mariel – Ang Lakwatserang Sirena	Brittney
2018	Tadhana: Babae Ako	Pamela
2018	My Guitar Princess	Shakira
2019	Hanggang sa Dulo ng Buhay Ko	Trinity
2019	Dragon Lady	Edna
2019	The Orbiters	Mary Anne
2019	Maynila: Love Scam and Go	Luwalhati
2020	Ate ng Ate Ko	Char
2020	Bawal na Game Show	Herself – Pasaway
2021	Owe My Love	Maid
2022	Family Feud Philippines	Herself – Team Survivor
2022	K-Love	Yaya Beth
2023	TiktoClock	Herself – Guest
2023	Royal Blood	Loida
2023	Family Feud Philippines	Herself – Team Kasambahay
2023	Luv Is: Caught in His Arms	Patutina
2024	Family Feud Philippines	Herself – Tribong Palaban
2024	Pepito Manaloto: Tuloy ang Kuwento	Jacob’s Maid
2024	Forever Young	Belle
2024	Makiling	Petra
2025	Lilet Matias: Attorney-at-Law	Jasmin
2025	Family Feud Philippines	Herself – The Breaking Muse
2025	Encantadia Chronicles: Sang'gre	Yaya (uncredited)
2026	House of Lies	Weng

=== Film ===
Year	Title	Role
2008	Iskul Bukol 20 Years After: The Ungasis and Escaleras Adventure	Datu Piang's Daughter
2014	English Only, Please	Tere's mare
2016	Babaylan	
2016	Rendezvous	
2016	Ang taba ko kasi	Mae
2022	Security Academy	
2024	Halinghing	Candy
2025	Ang Aking Mga Anak	Yaya Eve
2026	Breaking the Silence	
