= Survivor Philippines: Palau =

Season of a Philippine television reality show

- Title card
- Presented by: Paolo Bediones
- No. of days: 39
- No. of castaways: 16
- Winner: Amanda Coolley Van Cooll
- Runners-up: Justine Ferrer; Jef Gaitan
- Location: Peleliu, Palau, Micronesia
- No. of episodes: 65 + 1 Reunion Special

Release
- Original release: August 17 – November 15, 2009

Additional information
- Filming dates: May 28 – July 5, 2009

Season chronology
- ← Previous; Season 1 Next → Celebrity Showdown

Survivor Philippines: Palau is the second season of the Philippine version of the reality television series Survivor. The season was filmed on the island of Peleliu in Palau. The season aired on GMA Network five times a week from August 17, 2009, until the live finale on November 13, 2009, when Amanda Coolley van Cooll was named the winner over Justine Ferrer and Jef Gaitan by a jury vote of 4–3–0, earning the ₱3,000,000 and the title of Pinoy Sole Survivor.

== Format changes ==
- Pre-merge individual immunity: Before the merge, the tribe that won the immunity challenge had the power to give one member from the losing tribe immunity at the next Tribal Council.
- Isla Purgatoryo: A secluded area with minimal supplies where voted out contestants competed against each other in duels to remain in the game. At the merge, the winner of the duel returned to the game and the twist was retired. This twist was based on the duels from the sixth Swedish season and the Island of the Dead twist from the first Israeli season, and later appeared in the American version as Redemption Island.
- Blood pearl: In addition to the black and white pearls from the previous season, this season introduced the "blood pearl", a red pearl that automatically gave the holder two votes at the next Tribal Council; if the blood pearl is lost, the holder would then receive three votes.
- Final Tribal Council: This season, three finalists faced the jury vote instead of two. In case of a tie, the seven jurors would revote between the tied finalists.

== Contestants ==
The 16 players were initially divided into two tribes, Airai and Koror. On Day 23, the remaining players were merged into one tribe, Sonsorol. All three tribes were named after states of Palau. Airai and Koror also share their names with tribes from the seasons of the American production that were also filmed in Palau: Survivor: Micronesia and Survivor: Palau, respectively.

Contestant	Original tribe	Switched tribe	Merged tribe	Main game (Note: Elimination order is based on when the contestant was voted out at Tribal Council.)	Isla Purgatoryo
Justine Ferrer; Returned to game	Koror	None (Note: Justine was not assigned either tribe during the tribe switch due to being on Isla Purgatoryo.)		1st voted out Day 3	Returnee; Day 23
Carol Gementiza; 45, Iloilo City	Koror			2nd voted out Day 6	Lost Face-off 1 Day 7
May Marie "Maya" Segovia; 32, Batangas City	Airai			3rd voted out Day 9	Lost Face-off 2 Day 10
Vladimir "Vlad" Nesas; 24, Las Piñas	Airai	Airai		4th voted out Day 12	Quit; Day 13
Troy Perez; 27, Metro Manila	Airai	Airai		5th voted out Day 15	Lost Face-off 3 Day 16
John Louie Ang; 24, Pasig, Manila	Koror	Airai		6th voted out Day 18	Lost Face-off 4 Day 19
Crisanto "Cris" Bolado†; 39, Quezon Province	Airai	Airai		7th voted out Day 21	Lost Face-off 5 Day 23
Marvin Kiefer; 18, Cagayan de Oro, Misamis Oriental	Koror	Koror	Sonsorol	8th voted out 1st jury member Day 25	
Tara Jane Macias; 19, Cebu City	Koror	Airai	Sonsorol	9th voted out 2nd jury member Day 28	
Francia Floresca "Echo" Caceres; 20, Bicol	Koror	Koror	Sonsorol	10th voted out 3rd jury member Day 28	
Suzuki Sadatsugu; 21, Tondo	Koror	Koror	Sonsorol	11th voted out 4th jury member Day 31	
Shaun Rodriguez; 31, Zambales	Airai	Koror	Sonsorol	12th voted out 5th jury member Day 34	
Mika Batchelor; 25, Palawan	Airai	Airai	Sonsorol	13th voted out 6th jury member Day 37	
Charles Fernandez; 21, Dagupan	Koror	Airai	Sonsorol	14th voted out 7th jury member Day 38	
Jef Gaitan; 19, Laguna	Airai	Koror	Sonsorol	Second Runner-up	
Justine Ferrer; 29, Caloocan	Koror	None	Sonsorol	First Runner-up	
Amanda Coolley Van Cooll; 25, Mindoro	Airai	Koror	Sonsorol	Sole Survivor	

== Season summary ==
Challenge winners and eliminations by cycle
Episodes		Isla Purgatoryo face-off		Challenge winner(s)		Eliminated	Finish
No.	Original air dates	Winner	Eliminated	Reward	Immunity	Eliminated	Finish
1–5	August 17 to 21, 2009	None (Note: There was no Isla Purgatoryo duel as there were fewer than two inhabitants.)		Airai	Airai	Justine	1st voted out Day 3
1–5	August 17 to 21, 2009	None		Airai	Carol (Note: The tribe that won the immunity challenge chose to give this castaway from the losing tribe immunity at their tribe's Tribal Council.)	Justine	1st voted out Day 3
6–10	August 24 to 28, 2009	None		Koror	Airai	Carol	2nd voted out Day 6
11–15	August 31 to September 4, 2009	Justine	Carol	Koror	Koror (Note: The challenge winners won an additional reward.)	Maya	3rd voted out Day 9
11–15	August 31 to September 4, 2009	Justine	Carol	Koror	Jef	Maya	3rd voted out Day 9
16–20	September 7 to 11, 2009	Justine	Maya	Airai	Koror	Vlad	4th voted out Day 12
21–25	September 14 to 18, 2009	Justine	Vlad (Note: No challenge; Vlad quit the game.)	Cris, Charles, Echo, Marvin, Mika, Suzuki (Note: For this challenge, the castaways were divided into mixed-tribe teams based on the results of a popularity contest; the more popular team defeated the less popular team.)	Koror	Troy	5th voted out Day 15
21–25	September 14 to 18, 2009	Justine	Vlad	Cris, Charles, Echo, Marvin, Mika, Suzuki	Cris	Troy	5th voted out Day 15
25–30	September 18, 21 to 25, 2009	Justine	Troy	Koror	Koror	Louie	6th voted out Day 18
25–30	September 18, 21 to 25, 2009	Justine	Troy	Koror	Cris	Louie	6th voted out Day 18
30–35	September 25, 28 to October 2, 2009	Justine	Louie	Koror	Koror	Cris	7th voted out Day 21
30–35	September 25, 28 to October 2, 2009	Justine	Louie	Koror	Tara	Cris	7th voted out Day 21
35–40	October 2, 5 to 9, 2009	Justine (Note: Returned to game upon winning the challenge.)	Cris	None (Note: There was no reward challenge because of the merge.)	Shaun	Marvin	8th voted out 1st jury member Day 25
35–40	October 2, 5 to 9, 2009	Justine	Cris	None	Justine (Note: For returning to the game, Justine earned individual immunity from the next Tribal Council.)	Marvin	8th voted out 1st jury member Day 25
41–45	October 12 to 16, 2009	None (Note: Isla Purgatoryo was retired at the merge.)		Jef, Mika, Shaun	Suzuki	Tara	9th voted out 2nd jury member Day 28
41–45	October 12 to 16, 2009	None		Jef, Mika, Shaun	Justine (Note: For placing second in the immunity challenge before the double Tribal Council, Justine earned immunity from the second round of voting.)	Echo	10th voted out 3rd jury member Day 28
46–50	October 19 to 23, 2009	None		Survivor; Auction	Charles	Suzuki	11th voted out 4th jury member Day 31
51–55	October 26 to 30, 2009	None		Shaun [Justine]	Amanda [Mika]	Shaun	12th voted out 5th jury member Day 34
56–60	October 30, November 2 to 6, 2009	None		Amanda [Mika]	Amanda	Mika	13th voted out 6th jury member Day 37
61–63	November 9 to 11, 2009	None		None	~~Charles~~ (Note: Charles won the challenge, but gave immunity to Justine in exchange for a reward of a condominium unit.) (Justine)	Charles	14th voted out 7th jury member Day 38
64–65	November 12 and 13, 2009					Jury vote	
64–65	November 12 and 13, 2009					Jef	Second Runner-up
64–65	November 12 and 13, 2009					Justine	First Runner-up
64–65	November 12 and 13, 2009					Amanda	Sole Survivor

== Episodes ==
=== Days 1–3 (Episodes 1–5) ===
- First Reward Challenge: Using a map to guide them, tribes traverse the obstacle-filled island while toting two ammo crates filled with supplies for each tribe. The tribes must follow the designated route and not take the paths that were marked by exclamation points, for the island is infested with exploding landmines. The first tribe to reach the other side of the island wins the first reward.
  - Reward: The winning tribe would have their two ammo crates with them; the losing tribe would take only a bolo knife.
- Second Reward Challenge: The members of each tribe are divided into two: one group of six puzzle seekers and another group of two puzzle solvers. The puzzle seekers, harnessed to each other, enter a partially submerged maze to retrieve twelve bundles of puzzle pieces and exit through the opposing tribe's entrance. The puzzle pieces are passed to the puzzle solvers, who would untie the pieces and solve the puzzle. The first tribe to solve their puzzle wins the second reward.
  - Reward: A piece of flint.
- Immunity Challenge: Each tribe would dig out a stone monolith weighing 250 kg (550 lb) and carry it between two balance beams and over a wall before placing it on its new portal. Once that is done, two tribe members would jump into a sand pit and search for the immunity idol. First person to find the idol wins immunity for their tribe.
  - Additional stipulation: If Koror would win the challenge, they would get their supply crates outright. If Airai would win, they would decide whether or not Koror should get their supply crates.

Day 1: Upon arrival at the island, first on a military vessel, and then on two small speed boats, the castaways were met by Paolo at the island. He called out the oldest male and female castaways, Cris and Carol, and the tribes were formed through a schoolyard pick, along with the distribution of buffs. After the tribes were told that they would only have the clothes they were wearing with them, they were immediately put in their first challenge. In the first reward challenge, internal and external conflicts between tribe members about direction kept Koror off track, thus enabling Airai to advance further and take the win. The dynamics of each tribe seemed to have continued when they reached their respective camps; differing opinions prevented Koror from focusing their efforts on their shelter, while Airai's shelter was finished quickly due to division of work, with Troy providing coconuts for sustenance. But at night, with both tribes unable to make fire, the members of the tribes had to huddle with each other for warmth. At Airai, Troy flirted with his female tribemates while at Koror, Charles went down with a fever, making Suzuki and Echo huddle him for warmth.

Day 2: At Koror, Charles was well enough to help around, thanks to his tribemates' compassion, while Echo built a bench for her tribe. At Airai, while the entire tribe was taking a bath, Troy restarted his flirting with Mika. Back at Koror, knowing they would eventually go to Tribal Council early, the tribe members discussed about voting plans and decided that Carol, whom the others saw as more of a talker, be the first one off. In the second reward challenge, while Koror was the first to exit the maze, untying the puzzle bundles hampered the tribe's progress, enabling Airai to come from behind and win their second consecutive challenge. Back at Airai camp, Amanda became the first one to make fire. Mika and Jef confided to each other about a gender-based voting strategy within Airai. At Koror, along with Justine's talk to unite the tribe, the tribe's resolve to vote out Carol became stronger. Back at Airai, Shaun, Vlad, and Troy were also planning a gender-based voting strategy of their own.

Day 3: At Koror, Tara, Justine, and Echo asked each other about the boys they would eventually keep, which would be Suzuki and Marvin. At Airai, Jef and Mika were planning to sway Cris to the ladies' side, not knowing that Shaun, Vlad, and Troy were already urging Cris to vote with them along gender lines. In the immunity challenge, atrocities once again plagued Koror, enabling Airai to pull away and win immunity. As an added twist, Airai was tasked to choose a member of Koror to be immune from elimination; they chose Carol due to her age. She pulled out one eye of the immunity idol to reveal an immunity bracelet which she would wear at Tribal Council (the other eye also had a bracelet, later revealed to be the symbol for the current inhabitant of Isla Purgatoryo). Citing strategic purposes, Airai also opted not to give Koror their crates. Back at the Koror camp, Justine voiced her disgust over Carol's immunity, saying that she is only a "display". The tribe then searched for other options on whom to vote off. When Tara asked Charles whom he would vote off, she became enraged when she heard her name from Charles. Their conversation turned heated, but they later reconciled, with Charles suggesting to Tara that she vote against him. There was talk that either Justine or Charles was the one to be the first to be voted out as they were seen as the weakest. At Tribal Council, it was revealed that Justine is a trans woman, something that was "confirmed" by Echo and Tara. Despite Justine's special case, because of her perceived weakness, she became the first castaway to be voted out of Palau, 7–1.

=== Days 4–6 (Episodes 6–10) ===
- Reward Challenge: With letters painted at the front and back and standing on a ledge, tribe members would try to spell the answer to the riddle being given by the host. Each member must traverse the ledge and can only touch one tribemate at a time. The first tribe to form the riddle's answer wins a point. First tribe to three wins the reward.
  - Reward: Fishing gear. Also, if Koror would win the challenge, they would get their supply crates outright. If Airai would win, they would once again decide whether or not Koror should get their supply crates.
- Immunity Challenge: Tribes squabble over a coconut placed in the middle of a field and take it to their goal at the other side to score a point. The coconut could be passed between members in any way except overhead. The first tribe to score three points wins immunity.

Day 4: Talk among the Koror tribe members was mostly about Justine, especially on how they found out too late about her being a transsexual. Unknown to them, Justine was sent to Isla Purgatoryo, where she was met by Paolo, who told her about her chance to return to the game and other essential elements about living in Isla Purgatoryo. Afterwards, she spent her first day alone there. Meanwhile, the two tribes fought over six chickens hidden in the entire island (both tribes are situated in one island). Airai got all six chickens, with Vlad fooling Louie to confuse the latter. Back in Koror, Echo and Tara talked about how Louie was useless at camp, while Marvin and Louie moved to sway Echo and Tara's votes. In the reward challenge, Koror narrowly defeated Airai 3-2, finally giving Koror their first challenge win and their supply crates. Word of Koror's win reached Justine at Isla Purgatoryo and she therefore received a fishing net for being their former tribemate. At Koror's camp, the tribe savored their first win by cooking their first batch of rice porridge in days. They also talked about Airai's show of pride, particularly when Troy seemingly regurgitated feathers from his mouth to show that Airai had the chickens. Meanwhile, at the Airai camp, the tribe, unaffected by their first loss, had their first meal of chicken.

Day 5: When Koror's next treemail, which was just a simple riddle, was interpreted as that of the next immunity challenge, Marvin, Louie, Suzuki, and Echo talked about the possibility of voting out either Tara or Carol, should they return to Tribal Council. At Airai, Jef, Maya, Mika, and Amanda planned on forming an all-female alliance. But Maya's recent remarks left the other women doubting about her integrity. Back at Koror, Suzuki entertained his tribemates by imitating the host. While that was going on, Tara and Echo related their strategies for their tribe's possible return to Tribal Council. Later, while having nothing to eat due to the loss of their fire the night before, Suzuki showed his tribemates how to walk on a fashion runway. On the other hand, Louie did some go-go dancing in front of Carol, to her chagrin. At Airai, after showing her tribemates a picture of her and her daughters, Maya became evasive towards questions about family life. In the immunity challenge, which involved squabbling over coconuts, Airai won again 3-2. With individual immunity not given this time, Carol's ouster seemed imminent, based on Louie and Echo's conversation.

Day 6: While bathing, Suzuki, Charles, and Louie confirmed about them voting for Carol, but also had thoughts ousting Marvin later in the game because of his strength. At Airai, the women did not agree to take Maya's suggestion of just picking names on whom to vote out. Back at Koror, Charles started to help around camp in the hopes that his tribemates would no longer see him as weak. Marvin noticed that the fishing net could not be used as it was supposed to and then accused Carol of tangling the net the same way she did with the fishing pole's line the day before; Carol denied mishandling the net. At night, before proceeding to Tribal Council, talk was about Louie's frequent use of swear words as well as possible topics at Tribal Council. At Tribal Council itself, Carol was unanimously voted out as expected, 6-1.

=== Days 7–9 (Episodes 11–15) ===
- Face-off Challenge: Cast-offs unscramble coconuts forming five military and warfare-related words within fifteen minutes. First person to form the five words or the one who forms the most words when the time limit expires stays in Isla Purgatoryo.
- Reward Challenge: Tribe members are divided into five sled pullers and a navigator riding the sled. Using a map, each tribe searches for four stations, retrieving a wheel at each one in order. Once all four wheels are retrieved, the sled is pulled into an assembly station, where the wheels are installed into the sled, converting it into a wagon. The wagon is then pulled to the finish line, where the four wheels are removed and placed on a gear mechanism to raise a flag. First tribe to raise their flag wins the reward.
  - Reward: A festive breakfast and a strategic advantage to be used later in the game.
- Immunity Challenge: The tribe is divided into three pole huggers and three pullers. The pullers, two at a time, try to extract each of the opposing tribe's huggers from their poles and pull them to their mat. First tribe to pull all of the opposing tribe's huggers to their mat wins immunity and reward.
  - Additional reward: A "protection package" consisting of bath water and toiletries from Unilever.

Day 7: At Airai, Jef discovered that the pot had a large crack. While no one knew how the crack got there, they were resigned to limit their food servings because of this. At Koror, a day after Carol's ouster, the tribe had a refreshed feeling and Suzuki further entertained his tribemates. At Isla Purgatoryo, after Justine and Carol met each other for the first time in three days and did their own things soon after, the two competed in the face-off challenge, where Justine prevailed over Carol, 4-2, thus eliminating Carol from the game for good. Meanwhile, at the Reward Challenge, an accident involving Amanda enabled Koror to forge ahead to the point of using dirty tricks, eventually winning the challenge. Back at Airai, the men were contemplating on what went wrong in the challenge, while Jef, Mika, and Amanda wished they would lose immunity challenges instead so they could remove Troy from their tribe. At Koror, the tribe was visited by a survival expert named Suzumo, who not only taught them fishing and shelter-building techniques, but also gave them their piece of flint.

Day 8: At Koror, Suzuki and Suzumo caught five fish together, which the tribe later feasted on. At Airai, the tribe caught a multitude of fish from those that were washed ashore. During their mealtime, Maya noted Troy's consumption of too much food. Back at Koror, the tribe bade goodbye to their guest. During the immunity challenge, Shaun heard something from inside his ribs, thus requiring him medical attention. The challenge was temporarily halted so he would be evacuated to the nearest hospital. When the challenge resumed with virtual stalemates, Paolo allowed a third puller from each tribe to come in and help. This last-minute rule change enabled Koror to edge Airai for their first immunity win as well as their first proper bath in over a week. The immunity bracelet was given again this time, where Koror chose Jef to have it. At Isla Purgatoryo, Justine also had her first bath. At Airai, Vlad and Troy thought of the possibility of Shaun not returning to the game when they discussed their voting strategy. But when Vlad noted to himself how Troy had irritated several of his tribemates, he decided to share part of his strategy to Mika. Later, the tribe prayed for Shaun's recovery. Fortunately, doctors determined Shaun's injury to be less serious than first thought, thus, allowing him to return to the game.

Day 9: Troy, on his birthday, started to work harder for the tribe, which the women saw as too little, too late. Mika talked to Maya and Jef about what Vlad told her the day before. At Koror, amid talk of their daily lives, the tribe also predicted either Troy or Vlad to be the next one out. Back at Airai, Shaun returned to camp and caught up with the strategies for Tribal Council. But with the possibility of a tie considering the choices of the gender alliances, Shaun and Mika had a lengthy talk, trying to sway each other's votes. At Tribal Council, the Airai tribe denied allegations of disunity and lack of brains by Charles and Louie respectively. In the voting that ensued, the tie did not materialize; instead, Amanda and Mika sided with the men, resulting in Maya being voted out, 6-2.

=== Days 10–12 (Episodes 16–20) ===
- Reward Challenge: Using an underwater cheatboard, a swimmer from each tribe gathers one (later two) of the sixteen Palauan state flags, swim back to shore, and place the flag at its correct place on the giant map of Palau. First tribe to place all sixteen flags at their proper spots in the map wins the reward.
  - Reward: Servings of Filipino street foods (Fish balls, Banana cue, etc.) and drinks.
- Face-off Challenge: Cast-offs each assemble the wheels of a cart and use it to transport six totem pole pieces, each brought down from one of six poles. Upon reaching the assembly area back at the starting line, the totem pole pieces are then assembled. The first person to assemble their totem pole stays in Isla Purgatoryo.
- Immunity Challenge: Tribe members lift a cage from the inside and transport it across six stations. At each station, they would pick up a rai stone that is either hung or buried in the ground, and then hang it on one of the hooks surrounding the cage. Once all six rai stones are obtained, the tribe heads over to a mat, place their rai stones on a basket as weights to release four keys, which they would use to release themselves from the cage and head to a second tribal mat. The first tribe to have all six members on the second mat wins immunity and reward.
  - Additional reward: Letters from loved ones at home.

Day 10: A day after being voted out, Maya was brought to Isla Purgatoryo. After Justine told Maya about the basics of the island, Justine started to doubt herself after knowing of Maya being a military woman. Meanwhile, before the reward challenge, the castaways drew lots, resulting in Shaun, Jef, and Amanda being transferred to Koror and Charles, Louie, and Tara to Airai. In the reward challenge itself, while swimming problems and exhaustion plagued both tribes, Marvin bringing back one flag when he could have brought two enabled Airai to move ahead and win the reward. Afterwards, the new members of each tribe started to settle into their new surroundings. At Airai, Troy and Vlad immediately took in Charles and Louie into their alliance. At Koror, Amanda briefly explained to Jef that she voted out Maya because she trusted Cris more. Back at Airai, Tara reminded Charles to secretly stick to each other in going against Vlad and Troy and to watch Louie for his possible betrayal. At Koror, Echo talked to Suzuki to stay true to their original alliance, especially about their voting possibilities. At Isla Purgatoryo, Justine pulled a win in the face-off challenge against a visibly exhausted Maya, making the latter the latest person to completely leave the game. At Airai, Louie, looking for better voting strategies, was told by Cris not to trust Vlad and Troy that much because of their laziness. At night, Troy began to flirt with Mika, much to Tara's chagrin.

Day 11: At Airai, upon waking up, Louie talked to Mika and Tara about their voting strategies wherein the two women expressed their willingness to oust Vlad and Troy. On the other hand, the original Koror members Echo, Marvin, and Suzuki also talked about possible voting strategies and proposed to keep Shaun for the long run because of his strength. Meanwhile, at Isla Purgatoryo, with nothing else to do, Justine pondered at the beach about her loved ones back home. At Koror, Echo started to have a "reaction" after eating a meal of crabs, long after she reminded herself about the last time she had such reaction. Before the immunity/reward challenge, the castaways were presented photos of loved ones as well as heard fragments of the letters from Vlad's mother and Echo's family for motivation. In the challenge itself, Koror led all the way until the sixth station, where Airai caught up. But Koror led again from there and ultimately snatched the win. While Koror celebrated, Vlad approached Charles and convinced him to vote out Louie because Vlad claimed Louie planned to oust Cris. Mika, who overheard and interfered the conversation, was also approached by Vlad. Upon returning to the Airai camp, Vlad told the same thing to several of his other tribemates. Troubled, Mika told Cris about the allegation. Cris, in turn, confronted Louie about it. Appalled upon hearing the allegation, Louie not only denied it, but also said that Vlad blew the challenge.

Day 12: Mika reiterated to Tara her pledge to stay truthful to their alliance. At Koror, the tribe read each other's letters from home, making them emotional. At Isla Purgatoryo, Justine also received a letter from her family. Back at Airai, Vlad tried to convince Tara and Charles to join his alliance. At Tribal Council, Mika admitted that the original Airai tribe wasn't united, contrary to what was said in the previous Tribal Council. Furthermore, several tribe members claimed that the switch made the new Airai more united. Vlad also admitted that he was slacking off at camp because he thought he wasn't himself lately. While Vlad and Troy indeed voted against Louie, Vlad's laziness and double-dealing made the rest of Airai turn against him. Vlad, thus, became the first male castaway voted out of the game, 5-2.

=== Days 13–15 (Episodes 21–25) ===
- Reward Challenge: Groups of members from each team stand on a circular platform and try to push the members of the other team out of the platform using cushions. The team with at least one member still on the platform after those of the other team have been eliminated wins a point. The first team to five wins the reward.
  - Reward: Servings of crispy pata (deep-fried pig's legs), unlimited servings of rice and several bottles and cans of Coke Zero.
- Immunity Challenge: Tribe members hold onto a log with one as a header, a second as a tail end, and the rest clipped to the log. Tribes race through four sets of obstacles: they jump through a tire path, go through a commando crawl, go up and over two wooden walls and use the log as a battering ram to barge through a cement wall. After each obstacle, there is a mat where a member unclips oneself from the log. After the last obstacle, the header and the tail end lift the log to a final mat, drop the log there and race back to the starting line, tapping their tribemates along the way to join them. First tribe to have all six members back wins immunity.

Day 13: At Airai, Louie confronted Troy and asked if the second vote against him came from the latter. Troy denied this (although he actually did), after which Louie told him that he would likely be next. At Isla Purgatoryo, Vlad met up with Justine. After Justine told Vlad the basics of being on the island as well as her past opponents, Vlad told her his decision not to compete in the face-off challenge anymore because his experience in the game already tested him to the point of near insanity. Justine appreciated his decision, adding that she was still continuing to strive in living in the island despite the urge to quit. The two then said their goodbyes as Vlad left the island. Meanwhile, before the reward challenge, the tribes were given a survey on rating one's tribemates. Shaun, Jef, Amanda, Tara, Louie, and Troy, the least liked members of their tribes, were separated to form one group, the green team. Marvin, Echo, Suzuki, Cris, Mika, and Charles, the most liked ones, became the orange group. Buffs were also temporarily removed to further establish the groups. In the reward challenge, the orange team won 5-2. As with previous reward challenges, the green team watched as the orange team feasted. Upon return to camp, the Koror tribe talked mainly about the results of the survey before the challenge. Amanda also expressed how bad she felt being on the same group as those she hated, implying to her the closeness of the original Koror members. Later, Jef coaxed Marvin to tell some things about himself, which he did using abbreviated answers, showing his mature, yet mysterious personality.

Day 14: The latest treemail instructed the tribes to send an "ambassador" to the other tribe. Both tribes had hunches that these "ambassadors" would stay with the other tribe for good. Airai chose Tara for being originally from Koror, while Koror went with Amanda for her eloquence and the need for men later in the Immunity Challenge. The ambassadors played Truth or Dare with their respective host tribes (i.e. Tara with Koror and Amanda with Airai), giving away various small items as reward to those who truthfully answered their questions and accomplished the stunts requested. Afterwards, the ambassadors returned to their respective tribes. Before Tara returned though, she proposed an all-women alliance in the merge to Echo and Jef; this was relayed to Amanda upon her return and the three Koror women decided to disregard this, knowing Tara's personality. At the immunity challenge, Airai initially led, but Koror caught up soon after and won. Individual immunity was given out this time, with Echo giving the bracelet to Cris due to his likability. Upon return to camp, Troy suggested to Louie to oust Tara because of her talkativeness. He also made the same suggestion to Charles. Unknown to Troy, Tara heard of this through Louie and told him to stick with their original plan. Before everyone slept, Troy and Tara had a brief argument about what went wrong in the immunity challenge.

Day 15: As he had promised Louie and Charles the day before, Troy finally told Cris his plan to vote off Tara to retain the solidness of the Airai men. Later, Tara and Louie, together with Charles, considered the number of the former Koror in Airai and decided to further be solid on this affiliation when it comes to voting. At Airai's third straight Tribal Council, Troy's plan to oust Tara backfired, as he was the one voted out, 5-1, due to his obnoxious behavior.

=== Days 16–18 (Episodes 25–30) ===
- Face-off Challenge: Cast-offs swim out to floating bundles of bamboo stalks and bring the stone anchors (attached to the bundles) to shore. First person to accomplish this stays in Isla Purgatoryo.
- Reward Challenge: Tribe members hang (with the dorsal parts of their body facing the ground) onto horizontal logs for as long as they can without any part of their body except their hair or their clothes touching the ground. The tribe that still has at least one member hanging on after all members of the other tribe have been eliminated wins the reward.
  - Reward: A full body massage for all tribe members, to be attended by two masseuses. The tribe would also keep the beds used.
- Immunity Challenge: Each castaway would consume two fruit bats in two minutes. Opposing tribe members would be judged in pairs; the castaway with the cleaner plate gets one point for their tribe. The tribe with the most points wins immunity.

Day 16: Troy was immediately sent to Isla Purgatoryo, where he spent almost the entire day with Justine. In the face-off challenge, Troy initially led, but his inability to swim in deep water enabled Justine to go past him and win her first face-off challenge against a male cast-off. At Airai, Louie was still torn in ousting Tara next. Later, he, Cris, and Charles convinced each other of male domination in the game, knowing there were still five women in contention. At Koror, the relationship between Jef and Marvin got more intimate. In the reward challenge, with Amanda sitting out, Cris and Louie were the first two to fall within the first six minutes. They were followed later by Jef, Shaun, Charles, Suzuki and Tara. Over two hours after the start of the challenge, Mika became the last Airai member to be eliminated, with Marvin and Echo giving Koror the win. Upon returning to camp, Koror received and appreciated their refreshing, albeit painful massages. At Isla Purgatoryo, Justine also received a massage. At Airai, Louie asked Mika about her thoughts on Tara. When Mika answered favorably, Louie then aired his displeasure towards Tara due to her talkativeness. Talk then shifted to Louie and Mika's criteria on relationship partners. Back at Koror, after having another meal of crabs, Echo complained of shortness of breath and swelling in parts of her body, possibly as allergic reactions from the crabs. When her personal remedy did not ease her pain, her tribemates urged her to seek medical attention; which she did. She was given an anti-allergy injection and was told to stay in the medical tent for observation.

Day 17: At Koror, with Echo not yet returning, Shaun decided to take over her usual chores. Echo, who was deemed by the medical staff to be well enough to return to the game, was sent back to camp, to the delight of her tribemates. At Airai, Charles told Louie about Cris talking to Shaun during the reward challenge the day before, thus, rousing suspicions about a conspiracy between the latter two. At the immunity challenge, Koror once again edged Airai 3-2 with Cris losing automatically to Amanda after he vomited. When Cris was once again given the immunity bracelet, Louie's suspicion about Cris grew, thinking that Cris blew the challenge so Koror would win. Before leaving the challenge area, the tribes were told of another new twist: each tribe would return to the opposing tribe's camp; anything that was left there would stay there. So when Koror returned to Airai's original camp, they were so furious to see its unkempt and slovenly condition, as opposed to their original camp, which Airai savored to their delight. Thus, Koror decided to clean and rearrange their new camp. At Airai, worried about her possible elimination, Mika asked Tara and Charles about voting out Louie, which the two assured that they would. Back at Koror, Suzuki once again amused his tribemates to take their minds off of the squalid conditions of their new home.

Day 18: Koror managed to cook food despite their pot (which they inherited from Airai) having a large hole. At Airai, Louie asked Charles if Tara told him anything about voting out Mika, in which Charles answered none. Later, Louie and Cris took advantage of the cigarette Koror left behind, since none of the Koror tribe members smoke. At Tribal Council, Mika averred that Airai had become closer since Troy's ouster. At voting, Louie's plan of voting out Tara did not suffice; he was instead voted out unanimously, 4-1.

=== Days 19–21 (Episodes 30–35) ===
- Face-off Challenge: Using burlap rings as foot grippers, cast-offs must climb up poles and stay over a designated black line in the pole for as long as possible. To make the challenge harder, the burlap rings would be removed after two minutes. The one that stays on the pole after the other has fallen down stays in Isla Purgatoryo.
- Reward Challenge: A member of each tribe traverses a swinging hanging bridge and swims out to retrieve one of five puzzle pieces and bring it to an underwater puzzle box, where the piece should be attached snugly before the member can swim back to shore to tag the next tribe member. Once all five pieces are in place in the puzzle box, all tribe members, one-by-one, traverse the bridge, and all swim out to the puzzle box to retrieve it and bring it back to shore. First tribe to do this wins reward.
  - Reward: A large pan pizza to be eaten on site and hamburgers to be grilled and consumed back at camp, as well as three items they wanted from the other tribe's camp.
- Immunity Challenge: Four members of each tribe would lift a box which would be filled with colored water coming out from one of three plugs from a tank above their platform. The next two plugs would each be opened after every two minutes. When the box lowers to a certain level, a plug from the bottom of the box will open, which will cause the box to leak. The tribe that firmly holds on to their box after the other tribe's box had leaked wins immunity.

Day 19: At Isla Purgatoryo, Justine was surprised to see that Louie was the one voted out. After Justine told him the basics of being on the island, Louie revealed that the reason the original Koror voted her out was because of her being a transsexual, which riled Justine. In reality, Louie just made the story up to further Justine's anger on her former remaining tribemates, particularly Echo and Tara. At the face-off challenge, while Louie was the first to reach the top of his pole, when the burlap rings were taken off, he was also the first to fall down, giving Justine her fourth straight win. At Airai, the tribe waited in vain for any news of a merge, but to no avail. The newest treemail instructed both tribes to list three items they wanted from the other tribe's camp. Amanda and Tara then reprised their roles as ambassadors to each other's tribe to relay those requested items. When Amanda reported to her tribemates that Airai demanded Koror's already inferior bolo knife and pot (big hole and all), as well as their flint, the tribe surmised that Airai wanted Koror to suffer further should the former win the reward challenge. Fortunately for Koror, this did not materialize as Tara's difficulty in putting the puzzle pieces in the reward challenge enabled Koror to win their fourth consecutive challenge. Airai even grimaced at the sight of Koror eating pizza, knowing they had lost another challenge. Back at the Koror camp, while cooking and eating their hamburgers, Jef relayed to her tribemates the unsolicited assistance she received from Marvin during the reward challenge. At Airai, the tribe was still anticipating the merge, considering there were already ten castaways left (both tribes still being unaware of Justine at Isla Purgatoryo), as a presumption taken from past Survivor seasons. Charles even tried to convince his tribemates that a merge won't possibly come at all. At Isla Purgatoryo, Justine again received a part of her former tribe's reward.

Day 20: With the loss of their bolo knife and pot, the Airai tribe was forced to improvise, using a shovel to spark the flint and a metal first aid kit box as a makeshift pot to cook their food. Meanwhile, at Koror, Echo and Marvin talked about other options on whom to save from elimination next, as they wonder why Shaun constantly told his tribe that they should save Cris, perceiving an alliance between the latter two. Later, while eating, Marvin's straightforward remarks about Jef's seemingly defeated demeanor greatly affected her, leading the former to explain himself. Back at Airai, Cris attained a scrape on his foot while they were hunting, reminding his tribemates about the injury that ended his professional basketball career. The immunity challenge only lasted for less than two minutes when Charles shifted the wrong way, causing water to leak out off of Airai's box, giving Koror another win. This time, however, Koror gave individual immunity to Tara, who had been targeted because of her weaknesses. Back at the Airai camp, Tara started to set out plans on voting out Mika, but her mouthing and complaining irked Mika to the point that she thought Tara had a power trip. She was later joined by Charles, who admitted that he was leaning towards ousting Cris. He also said that he was leaving his own fate up to his tribemates rather than following Tara's plan. Tara and Mika's spat continued into the night, though they did had quiet talk by then.

Day 21: At Airai, Tara started working around camp, thus, satisfying her word to Mika. At Koror, Suzuki played checkers with several of his tribemates to fight boredom. Back at Airai, Charles felt that he would be voted out next and started thanking his tribemates for his time with them. The rest of the day was spent with the female Airai castaways convincing their male counterparts on whom to vote for. At Tribal Council, while Tara stayed true to her word of putting Mika's name in the vote, the latter ultimately joined Charles in voting out Cris, 2-1-1.

=== Days 22–25 (Episodes 35–40) ===
- Face-off Challenge: Using the materials provided, cast-offs would each build a shelter for the new merged tribe. The cast-offs would have until the next day to build the shelters. The shelters would be judged by the remaining castaways, not knowing that the cast-offs made them, based on the following criteria: foundation strength, water resistance, floor plan, comfort, and design. The cast-off who built the better shelter based on the assessment of the castaways would return to the game.
- Immunity Challenge: While shackled, castaways would build a fire high enough to burn a rope connected to another rope holding the keys to the shackles, which they would use to free themselves. Only the first six castaways to accomplish this would advance. The remaining castaways would then run to a forested area, traverse over a cargo net and dive into a mud pit to search for one of three satchels. Each satchel contains the stem parts of an oar. They would then assemble the stem with the flat blade to form the oar, hop onto a boat and use the oar to paddle themselves to a floating station where they would place their oar on a stand. First person to accomplish this wins immunity.

Day 22: At Isla Purgatoryo, Justine was surprised to see Cris coming towards her. After she told him the basics of being on the island, the two then competed in the final face-off challenge wherein the winner would rejoin the game. Meanwhile, at Airai, Tara worked while Mika and Charles continued to lounge at the shelter. Later, Tara started verbally lashing Charles for not telling her about voting off Cris, earning both Charles and Mika's ire. The two then conferred on giving any subtle messages later to Koror to tell them that they had made a wrong decision in saving Tara. When Tara's temper died down, she then tried to apologize to Charles and Mika and to mend fences with them.

Day 23: Work on the shelters continued at Isla Purgatoryo. Cris made his shelter elevated with a separate area for the fire. Justine's shelter, on the other hand, had a fireplace between two sleeping areas, to shield any fire from the rain. Meanwhile, Paolo announced the merge to the remaining castaways, elating everyone. The new tribe, Sonsorol, spent the rest of the day celebrating on a yacht, complete with food and drinks. At night, upon arrival at a new island, the Sonsorol tribe judged the two shelters Justine and Cris made. Afterwards, the host finally revealed, to the new tribe, Isla Purgatoryo and the events that happened there. Paolo then announced that Justine's shelter scored better, thus, marking her return to the game. She was also informed to keep her immunity bracelet (effective until the next Tribal Council), which was due to her return. The new tribe then continued their celebration with a feast and entertainment provided by some locals.

Day 24: On their first morning as a new tribe, Sonsorol was immediately put in their first individual immunity challenge. Shaun, Amanda, Mika, Justine, Jef and Marvin were the first to unshackle themselves and run to the mat. On the mud pits, Jef was the first to find a satchel, form an oar and paddle out, followed by Shaun. But just as Justine was about to leave the mud pit with the third satchel, Shaun already overtook Jef and won immunity. Upon return to camp, the tribe started to explore their new surroundings. Amanda listened to Charles and Mika on their time with Tara, as she didn't have the chance to be with Tara before. Justine was bitten by an eel while helping Echo, resulting a wound on her finger. Later, several castaways talked about Tara's recent actions. Mika and Amanda also talked about their possible game plans. Marvin, while skimming his journal notebook, found a poem written by Louie about life in the game, which affected the castaways' perception on the latter.

Day 25: As the day went on, Tara and Justine were seen talking to each other more often. As talks in the tribe concluded that Tara was the next to go, Marvin still had his hunch that he would be gone next because of his strength. This hunch proved to be correct, as he was voted out, 9-1, making him the first jury member. Before he left Tribal Council, he was presented the Cursed and White Pearls. He gave the Cursed Pearl to Mika, whom he perceived as the ringleader of a brewing all-female alliance. He then handed the White Pearl to Suzuki, wanting to see him, as well as the remaining men, advance further into the game.

=== Days 26–28 (Episodes 41–45) ===
- Reward Challenge: Castaways are divided into three groups of three, each group having one firer and two catchers. The firer vaults rattan balls over a wall using a slingshot. The catchers at the other side of the wall try to catch the balls using baskets on their heads. Only balls caught in the baskets would be counted. The first group to catch 10 balls wins the reward. In case a group's supply of balls have been exhausted, the challenge ends for that group; if all groups' supplies of balls have been exhausted, the challenge automatically ends and the group with the most number of balls caught wins.
  - Reward: A tour of Jellyfish Lake.
- Immunity Challenge: Based on the pandanggo dance, castaways stand on pedestals, each handling a candle on the palm of each hand, and imitate a specific pose shown. The position changes at certain time intervals. Dropping or curling their fingers around the candles would eliminate them from the challenge. Going out of position is equivalent to one violation; three violations would also mean elimination. Last one standing wins immunity.

Day 26: On her first day without Marvin around, Jef began to miss him, feeling guilty about voting him out in the previous Tribal Council. For the reward challenge, the castaways were divided into three groups by drawing lots. Echo, Tara, and Charles formed the Red Group; Suzuki, Amanda, and Justine composed the Pink Group; and Shaun, Jef, and Mika became the Yellow Group. The Yellow Group won the challenge by scoring a big lead over the two other teams. As Shaun, Jef, and Mika headed out for their reward, the castaways who were left behind were given a clue to a hidden immunity object somewhere back at camp and it was left to them if they would share this information with the other three. On their way to Jellyfish Lake, Mika told Shaun that an all-female alliance was indeed brewing and that he would be the next one eliminated unless he wins immunity in the next challenge. But according to Mika, her real intention was to have the original Airai members reach the final four. Back at camp, Echo used her bath-time as an excuse to search for the hidden immunity object, followed by Amanda. At one end of the island, the two found a bottle with a message pertaining to the possible whereabouts of the object. Afterwards, they both agreed that Tara must not possess the hidden immunity object. Suzuki asked Echo if the Koror alliance still existed, to which Echo gave a vague answer. Later, when Shaun, Jef and Mika returned from Jellyfish Lake, the rest of the tribe disclosed to them the existence of the hidden immunity object. At night, Echo, Jef and Amanda agreed that Shaun would be next to go. However, Amanda then told Jef and Mika about the clue related to the immunity object, in their quest to save Shaun.

Day 27: As Shaun prepared some firewood, Amanda gave him the first clue to the hidden immunity object, with the former later going out to shore to find it. Later, while the entire tribe tried to search for the hidden immunity object, Tara quit early, arousing suspicions that she had found the object. Jef joined Tara to confirm the suspicions, but she only unearthed nothing but Tara's qualms against Mika. On the other hand, Suzuki found a bottle containing the first clue to the immunity object, as well as a second clue. Unable to understand the clues, he shared them with Charles and the two decided to keep the clues to themselves. Later, Shaun told Suzuki and Charles that an all-female alliance was being hatched up by Echo and Justine, shocking Suzuki, who still believed in an all-Koror alliance. In the immunity challenge, Tara, Justine and Suzuki became the final three standing. After much trash-talking against her, Tara was soon eliminated, immediately followed by Justine, allowing Suzuki to win immunity. For finishing second, Justine was given a scroll which would be opened at Tribal Council; if it would be opened prematurely, she would be eliminated from the game.

Day 28: Initially hesitant, Suzuki and Charles eventually shared the newest clue to Shaun. Meanwhile, Jef and Amanda started to doubt Shaun's integrity, considering that he sided with them at one hand and was preparing a boys' alliance at the other. Later, the girls of the original Koror tribe planned of an all-Koror alliance. Justine and Echo later relayed this alliance to Charles and Suzuki, the latter two doubting it as a cover-up for the all-female alliance. At Tribal Council, the Sonsorol tribe confirmed Tara's ouster, 8-1-1. Afterwards, Paolo announced another round of voting and the scroll Justine received at the immunity challenge granted her automatic immunity for that round. When the votes were counted, Charles and Suzuki eventually went with the original Airai members in voting off a tearful Echo, 6-2. Before the tribe went back to camp, they were shown the Blood Pearl, which would be handed to the one voted out at the next Tribal Council.

=== Days 29–31 (Episodes 46–50) ===
- Reward Challenge (Survivor Auction): Each contestant gathers assortedly colored rai stones from an underwater chest in five minutes. Each blue rai stone retrieved is worth ₱10,000, red ones ₱5,000, and yellow ones ₱3,000. The one who amasses the most money would also receive a special prize. In the first round, contestants bid individually; during the second, the contestants are paired and each pair would bid together. The bidders can win mystery items, which are being bid alone or as one of two options.
  - Reward:
    - First round of the auction:
      - Mika: A whole roasted chicken and mango shake (over four chicken feet).
      - Shaun: Barbecue meal and pineapple juice.
      - Amanda: A piece of jell-o and a whole chocolate cake.
      - Charles, Suzuki, Justine, and Jef: Nothing
    - Second round of the auction:
      - Charles & Amanda: A spa treatment trip.
      - Shaun & Suzuki: A trip back to camp.
      - Justine & Jef: Coffee and snacks with President Johnson Toribiong (Mika joined on this reward because of the special prize she received: an open ticket to any of the trips won).
- Immunity Challenge: Castaways throw rocks at colored plates to be smashed or toppled to the ground, each color representing a particular castaway. The challenge ends when all rocks provided have been used. The one with most plates still standing wins immunity. In case of a tie, a tie-breaker round would take place using the same rules, this time involving ten rocks and five plates per castaway.

Day 29: Justine woke up still frustrated about Echo's ouster. Amanda, Jef, and Mika planned to vote off Suzuki next, knowing Justine would use the Blood Pearl on any one of them, whereas Suzuki would not. Instead of a Reward Challenge, a Survivor Auction was held. For having the most money collected during the challenge before the Auction, Mika received an envelope, which was revealed to be an open ticket to any of the trips won, and decided to join Justine and Jef. After meeting President Toribiong and having coffee and snacks with him, the three then had lunch, beside a traditional conference hut, with a local chieftain, during which they were allowed to gather a bunch of bananas to bring to camp. Charles and Amanda, on the other hand, enjoyed their reward, which included jetski rides and food served to them. Meanwhile, Suzuki and Shaun used their tribemates' absence to find the hidden immunity object, after Paolo informed them of another clue back at camp. Suzuki found a bottle containing the first two clues plus a third clue. Using the clues, Shaun and Suzuki finally found the object, a bracelet, from inside a bamboo stalk tied to a tree. Afterwards, the two then burned all of the clues to avoid suspicions of them having the object. At night, after Amanda and Charles had come back to camp, the former then asked Shaun about any new clues about the hidden immunity object. When Shaun said none, Amanda raised her suspicions of him and Suzuki. Much later, Justine, Jef, and Mika returned from their trip, giving the food they had gathered along the way to Shaun and Suzuki.

Day 30: Before the immunity challenge, the tribe smothered themselves with different colors of body paint that came with the treemail. At the challenge itself, Mika, Charles, and Suzuki were the ones with the most plates, resulting in a tie-breaker round wherein Charles emerged victorious. Before the tribe returned to camp, they were reminded that the hidden immunity object would only be effective before the final five and thus should be used in either of the next two Tribal Councils. Upon return to camp, Suzuki and Shaun were still keeping mum on their discovery of the hidden immunity object to their tribemates, including Charles, thus, arousing more suspicions from Mika. In the evening, Mika and the other women made their resolve to take out Shaun, only to find out afterwards that he had overheard them.

Day 31: Shaun confronted Mika about what he heard the night before. Mika responded to his questions by saying that they were just acting to prevent Justine from strategizing. Amidst the conversation, he revealed to her that he had the hidden immunity object in his possession. As Mika was not entirely convinced that Shaun had the object, she and Justine planned of voting for Suzuki instead, at the same time, fooling Shaun into playing his hidden immunity object. As a part of the aforementioned plan, Justine tried to convince Charles to eliminate Shaun, as she assumed that Charles would tell this knowledge to Shaun. Charles, after having a conversation with Jef, told Suzuki and Shaun that the women were already bent on taking out Suzuki next, but the latter two decided not to listen anymore. Knowing about Charles' blunder and that her plan had become awry, Justine made a pact with Jef and Charles, assuring each other in voting off Shaun, with Justine knowing that Shaun believed to what Charles had told him. At Tribal Council, an activity was held in which each castaway would be interviewed individually. After the voting, Shaun used the hidden immunity object, negating the three votes that otherwise would have removed him from the game. With Suzuki and Justine each having two out of the remaining four votes, a revote occurred, in which the three other women voted Suzuki off, 3-2. Before he left, he gave the Blood Pearl to Mika.

=== Days 32–34 (Episodes 51–55) ===
- Reward Challenge: The contestants go through an obstacle course that uses elements from past challenges. Starting from inside a cage, they dig out from under it, then traverse a net wall. The first four to traverse the wall and head to their mats then each eat a fruit bat in exchange for ten stones, to be used to break or topple three plates; if the ten stones run out with plates still standing, they have to eat another bat to have another ten stones and so on until all three plates are broken. Then, they each enter a maze to gather eight Palauan state flags, exit the maze and match those flags, as well as eight other flags, to their respective state names. A cheatboard some distance away from the flag stations is presented for guidance. The first two to correctly match their flags then hop over a tire obstacle course towards a sand pit in search of a rai stone. Then, they go through a command crawl toward a second sand pit to retrieve another rai stone. The rai stones would be used as counterweights for a battering ram, which would be used to smash a brick wall at the end. The one who smashes their wall first wins the reward.
  - Reward: ₱100,000 and a helicopter ride around Palau with a chosen companion.
- Immunity Challenge: Contestants stand on rafts with buckets on their heads half-filled with water. They initially start with both hands holding the bucket, but after thirty minutes, they would hold the bucket with only one hand. Spilling the water, holding the bucket with the other hand, or touching or falling off the raft would result in elimination. Last person standing wins immunity and an additional reward.
  - Additional reward: Two international phone calls to loved ones at home and one Internet phone call for a chosen companion, all courtesy of Smart Communications.

Night of Day 31: Upon return from Tribal Council, the women expressed their sadness over Suzuki's departure, knowing he almost did nothing wrong to earn their ire. Meanwhile, Shaun confronted Charles on why the latter didn't go with their plan on voting off Justine, resulting in a blame game among the two men.

Day 32: In the morning, Shaun related to Justine that he felt the same way in losing Suzuki as what she had felt upon Echo's ouster. Meanwhile, Charles and Jef discussed whom they should vote out next, with Mika, due to her having the Blood Pearl, emerging as one of their options. In the reward challenge, while Shaun came in behind Mika after the net wall, he was the first to break his three plates and led all the way to the finish. After being presented with the ₱100,000 check, he was shown a helicopter, signifying his physical reward, a helicopter trip around Palau. He chose Justine to join him in this reward. After they enjoyed their helicopter trip, Shaun and Justine landed at a beach where they had ice cream, while talking about how to influence their tribemates in their voting. Back at camp, Jef expressed to Charles how emotionally taxing the game had become. The women then discussed the possibility of Justine aligning herself with Shaun. Afterwards, Justine and Shaun returned to camp.

Day 33: Justine discussed with Jef and Charles what she and Shaun conversed about the day before, while also talking about the possibility of ousting Mika. While Mika and Amanda discussed Jef's "poor me" attitude, Justine came to them and relayed the same things she said to Jef and Charles, but this time, urging the two to vote for Shaun. Before the immunity challenge, they were shown MMS video messages from loved ones at home. At an immunity challenge which lasted for almost six hours, Shaun became the last one to fall, leaving Amanda to win immunity. As part of her reward, Amanda called her aunt. She then chose Mika to have the Internet call. While the two left to make their calls in private, the rest of the tribe were introduced to Season 1 contestant Marlon Carmen, who would join them in returning to camp. Meanwhile, Mika used her internet call to phone her mother, while Amanda made her second call, this time to her parents. Back at camp, Marlon told the tribe the experience he had in Thailand and reminded them to watch their alliances. When Amanda and Mika returned, they were shocked to see Marlon, thinking that his participation in the game was a part of another twist. Later, Marlon conversed with Charles alone about the latter's chances and strategies in the game.

Day 34: Marlon continued his individual talk and assessment on the other members of the Sonsorol tribe. Later, Shaun urged Charles to vote against Mika, knowing she had the Blood Pearl, also telling that the latter should convince Justine as well. Before the Sonsorol tribe proceeded to Tribal Council, Marlon bade farewell, with a last reminder to the castaways that they should bear in mind what he had advised to them. At Tribal Council, Paolo asked a barrage of tough questions to the castaways, even going to the point that Justine felt hot due to pressure. After the ensuing vote, Shaun was ousted by the entire tribe, 5–3, despite Mika having the Blood Pearl.

=== Days 35–37 (Episodes 56–60) ===
- Reward Challenge: Contestants hand paddle on their rafts from one end of the course, gathering six wheel spokes tied to ropes along the way. Meanwhile, their loved ones at the other end of the course untie their rafts from their buoys. Once the contestants gather all six spokes, they would assemble them on a wheel attached to their partner's raft and use it to bring their partner to the center platform. The first team to accomplish this wins immunity.
  - Reward: An overnight stay with their loved one at the Palau Pacific Resort, plus a scroll which they would read after the challenge.
- Immunity Challenge: Contestants dig into sand pits to search for a key. They then swim out to their respective buoys, dive down, and use their key to open their respective locked ammo crates. Each ammo crate contains eight ladder rungs. They would then untie these rungs and swim back to shore to assemble them to their poles, in which the assembly only goes one way. Once at the top of the pole, they would then untie a rope to raise a flag. First person to have their flag raised wins immunity.

Night of Day 34: The tribe returned to camp relieved that Shaun was gone. Talk among the tribe also involved the hard questions asked to them by Paolo and the stylish clothes the members of the jury were wearing.

Day 35: Justine and Jef talked about how the questions given to the tribe at the previous Tribal Council had affected them. Meanwhile, Charles expressed to Mika that he was bothered by the fact that since he was the only male castaway left, he would possibly be the next to go, to which she assured him that what he was thinking won't happen. Later, Jef expressed to Amanda her disappointment over the latter and Mika, especially after hearing that Amanda and Mika wanted each other in the final two rather than with her. Before the reward challenge, the castaways had a reunion with their loved ones: Mika's father, Amanda's cousin, Jef's friend, Charles's friend, and Justine's aunt. Despite Amanda's cousin taking too long in untying his raft, they won nonetheless because of Amanda's big lead over the other castaways. She chose Mika and her father to join her in the reward, leaving Jef disgruntled. The scroll Amanda won along with the reward told her of an option to exchange her trip for an immunity bracelet to be used in the next Tribal Council; she chose to push through with the trip. Mika, Amanda, and their loved ones went to their reward while the others sulked at camp.

Day 36: Mika and Amanda spent their vacation relaxing, while momentarily forgetting camp life. When Mika's father reminded them about the game, the two then began plotting to oust either Jef or Justine while using Charles in the process. The trio, meanwhile, began talking about Mika and Amanda while planning a strategy of their own against the two. They then passed their time playing some games, and then resumed their plotting, with Jef and Justine telling Charles to act like he would be the one voted out. After the last leg of their reward, which involved exploring Palau's marine life, Mika and Amanda bade goodbye to their loved ones and returned to camp later that evening. While the two retold their experiences to the others, they sensed that Jef was still angry and jealous at them. Meanwhile, Charles acted indifferently, as planned, so as not to throw Amanda and Mika off.

Day 37: Before the start of the immunity challenge, the castaways were informed that the immunity bracelet Amanda rejected in exchange for the reward would no longer be in play. During the immunity challenge, Jef, unable to swim further, called for help; ironically, she was saved by Mika. Amanda and Mika were the first two to swim back to shore and install their ladder rungs, with Amanda coming out victorious. Back at camp, due to the incident earlier, Amanda and Mika reached out to Jef convincing her that they should stick together up to the final three. But with Jef still torn on which alliance she should side on, Amanda & Mika left her alone to think about what had sufficed and decide on her own. Justine also advised Jef the same thing. When Amanda and Mika saw Jef still hanging out with Justine, they took it as a sign that Jef had turned her back on them, though at that point, she was still undecided. So, they convinced Charles to side with them on voting out Jef. Before proceeding to Tribal Council, Amanda told Jef outright that she would be voting for the latter. At Tribal Council, Justine correctly interpreted the contents of the treemail: that the final three castaways would face the final Tribal Council. In the ensuing vote, Charles ultimately sided with Jef and Justine in eliminating Mika, 3-2.

=== Day 38 (Episodes 61–63) ===
- Immunity Challenge: Contestants raise and hold on to ropes tied to crates each weighing 50 pounds (23 kg) for as long as they can without their crates touching the ground or both of their feet passing their marked lines. Last person standing wins a choice between immunity and a condominium unit in Makati, with the unclaimed prize to be given to a chosen fellow contestant.

Day 38: Upon return to camp, Amanda felt inferior due to Mika's departure. In an immunity challenge that went on for more than four hours, Charles outlasted Amanda to win what he thought was both immunity and the condominium unit. But Paolo clarified that he was only to keep either immunity or the unit, the decision of which would be known at Tribal Council. The unclaimed prize was for him to give to a chosen fellow contestant. Back at camp, after Jef vowed to Justine and Charles that she would not vote against Amanda, Justine suggested of an open forum among the remaining castaways. Amanda then used this opportunity to strategize by using her emotions, knowing that Charles and Jef would easily fall for it. Justine and Jef discussed their plans about Amanda and later told these to Charles. He, however, also conferred with Amanda, saying that he would give immunity to her. Justine, knowing that she would be given immunity instead, heard this and confronted Amanda, who admitted that she would vote for the latter. When Jef and Charles were entered into the discussion, it then became a heated spat, first between Justine and Amanda, and then between Justine and Jef. At Tribal Council, Charles officially gave up immunity in exchange for the condominium unit. Afterwards, an activity was held at which one member was out of the Tribal Council area as the others would talk about that person. But the argument Justine, Jef, and Amanda created earlier ultimately spilled into the discussion. Before voting, Charles handed immunity to Justine. In the ensuing vote, Justine and Charles voted for Amanda while Jef and Amanda opted for Charles, resulting in Amanda and Charles receiving two votes each. Justine and Jef's votes did not change in the tie-breaker vote, so a tiebreaker fire-making challenge ensued afterwards. Charles initially led, but he soon ran out of tinder, enabling Amanda to win the challenge and secure her spot in the final three.

=== Day 39 (Episodes 64–65) ===
Night of Day 38: Upon returning to camp, Jef, knowing that the game was already at an end and the burden of voting had already been relinquished, apologized to Justine about her departure from the alliance, to which the latter accepted.

Day 39: Amanda, Jef, and Justine went on their daily tasks for the last time, before going straight to Tribal Council, along the way, stopping at the torches representing the castaways who had left before them. At Tribal Council, they faced a mostly averse jury, especially from the visibly displeased Tara, Echo, and Mika. Amanda, Justine and Jef were accused of being two-faced, manipulative and weak, respectively. After voting took place, following Survivor tradition, Paolo picked up the voting urn and left the Tribal Council area.

Months later, in front of a live audience, Amanda was proclaimed the Pinoy Sole Survivor by the jury, with a vote of 4-3-0 over Justine. She was awarded a check worth three million pesos and this season's immunity necklace to symbolize the title.

== Voting history ==
	Original tribes			Switched tribes				Merged tribe										
Episode	5	10	15	20	25	30	35	40	45		50		55		60	63		
Day	3	6	9	12	15	18	21	25	28		31		34		37	38		
Eliminated	Justine	Carol	Maya	Vlad	Troy	Louie	Cris	Marvin	Tara	Echo	Tie (Note: The first Tribal Council vote resulted in a tie. Per the rules, a second vote was held where the castaways involved in the tie would not vote and the remaining castaways could only vote for those who tied.)	Suzuki	Shaun		Mika	Tie	Tie (Note: After two rounds of voting, Tribal Council remained tied. Per the rules, the two tied castaways competed in a fire making challenge to resolve the tie.)	Charles
Votes	7–1	6–1	6–2	5–2	5–1	4–1	2–1–1	9–1	8–1–1	6–2	2–2–0 (Note: Shaun played a hidden immunity object, therefore three votes against him were not counted.)	3–2	5–3		3–2	2–2	1–1	Challenge (Note: Charles lost to Amanda in the fire making tiebreaker challenge.)
Voter	Votes																	
Amanda			Maya					Marvin	Tara	Echo	Suzuki	Suzuki	Shaun		Jef	Charles	None (Note: Amanda and Charles were not eligible to vote in the second round of voting.)	Win
Justine	Charles							Marvin	Tara	Shaun	~~Shaun~~	None (Note: Justine and Suzuki were not eligible to vote in the second round of voting.)	Shaun		Mika	Amanda	Amanda	
Jef			Troy					Marvin	Tara	Echo	~~Shaun~~	Suzuki	Shaun		Mika	Charles	Charles	
Charles	Justine	Carol		Vlad	Troy	Louie	Cris	Marvin	Tara	Echo	~~Shaun~~	Justine	Shaun		Mika	Amanda	None	Lose
Mika			Maya	Vlad	Troy	Louie	Cris	Marvin	Tara	Echo	Suzuki	Suzuki	Shaun		Jef			
Shaun			Maya					Marvin	Tara	Echo	Justine	Justine	Mika					
Suzuki	Justine	Carol						Marvin	Tara	Echo	Justine	None	Mika	Mika (Note: Suzuki used an extra vote despite being cursed on a white pearl, therefore eight votes were cast in total.)				
Echo	Justine	Carol						Marvin	Tara	Shaun								
Tara	Justine	Carol		Vlad	Troy	Louie	Mika	Marvin	Shaun									
Marvin	Justine	Carol						Tara	Mika									
Cris			Maya	Vlad	Troy	Louie	Charles											
Louie	Justine	Carol		Vlad	Troy	Tara												
Troy			Maya	Louie	Tara													
Vlad			Maya	Louie														
Maya			Troy															
Carol	Justine	Charles																

Jury vote
Episode	65		
Day	39		
Finalist	Jef	Justine	Amanda
Votes	4–3–0		
Juror	Vote		
Charles		Justine	
Mika			Amanda
Shaun			Amanda
Suzuki			Amanda
Echo		Justine	
Tara			Amanda
Marvin		Justine	

A vote with a black background denotes that while the voter was already voted out, the recipient of the vote still got it through the Cursed Pearl. When the White Pearl is used, the last vote against the White Pearl's holder is the one crossed out, if any such vote appears.
