= Broken Vow (TV series) =

2012 Philippine television drama series

- Title card
- Genre: Romantic drama
- Developed by: Dode Cruz
- Written by: Obet Villela; Luningning Ribay; Onay Sales
- Directed by: Gil Tejada Jr.
- Creative director: Jun Lana
- Starring: Bianca King; Gabby Eigenmann; Luis Alandy; Rochelle Pangilinan
- Narrated by: Bianca King
- Theme music composer: Walter Afanasieff; Lara Fabian
- Opening theme: "Broken Vow" (instrumental)
- Ending theme: "Broken Vow" by Julie Anne San Jose
- Country of origin: Philippines
- Original language: Tagalog
- No. of episodes: 93

Production
- Executive producer: Meann P. Regala
- Producer: Wilma Galvante
- Production locations: Manila, Philippines; Bulacan, Philippines
- Cinematography: Lito Mempin
- Camera setup: Multiple-camera setup
- Running time: 20–32 minutes
- Production company: GMA Entertainment TV

Original release
- Network: GMA Network
- Release: February 6 – June 15, 2012

Broken Vow is a 2012 Philippine television drama romance series broadcast by GMA Network. Directed by Gil Tejada Jr., it stars Bianca King, Luis Alandy, Gabby Eigenmann and Rochelle Pangilinan. It premiered on February 6, 2012, on the network's Afternoon Prime line up. The series concluded on June 15, 2012, with a total of 93 episodes.

The series is streaming online on YouTube.

== Cast and characters ==
Lead cast

- Bianca King as Melissa Santiago
- Luis Alandy as Felix Rastro
- Gabby Eigenmann as Roberto Sebastian
- Rochelle Pangilinan as Rebecca Sta. Maria

Supporting cast

- Celia Rodriguez as Ofelia "Amorcita" Rastro
- Juan Rodrigo as Lucio Sebastian
- Carmi Martin as Rosanna Sebastian
- Melissa Mendez as Amor Santiago
- Ervic Vijandre as David Sebastian-Sta. Maria
- Marco Alcaraz as Michael Pascual
- Matet de Leon as Amy
- Jace Flores as Kenneth
- Lou Sison as Sheila
- Pancho Magno as Rico
- Kryshee Grengia as Eva Marie Santiago

Guest cast

- Ehra Madrigal as Rachel
- Jenine Desiderio as Jenny
- Dominic Roco as Wilson Ocampo
- Kylie Padilla as Jenna Rastro-Santiago
- Tonio Quiazon as Bryan Perez
- Menggie Cobarrubias as Mario Jimeno
- Divina Valencia as Digina
- Vaness del Moral as Ellen
- Joyce Ching as Malou
- Bodjie Pascua as Enrico
- Robert Ortega as Erwin

== Ratings ==
According to AGB Nielsen Philippines' Mega Manila household television ratings, the pilot episode of Broken Vow earned a 16.3% rating. The final episode scored a 26.7% rating.
