= Survivor Philippines =

Philippine television reality show

- Title card in 2011
- Genre: Reality competition
- Based on: Robinson (1997) by Charlie Parsons
- Directed by: Rico Gutierrez; Dante Nico Garcia; Monti Parungao; Martin Cabrera
- Presented by: Paolo Bediones; Richard Gutierrez
- Theme music composer: Russ Landau; Diwa de Leon
- Country of origin: Philippines
- Original language: Tagalog
- No. of seasons: 4
- No. of episodes: 269

Production
- Executive producers: Maria Carmela Torres; Kernan Gatbonton; Donnaliza Medina
- Camera setup: Multiple-camera setup
- Running time: 30–45 minutes
- Production company: GMA News and Public Affairs

Original release
- Network: GMA Network
- Release: September 15, 2008 – February 19, 2012

Survivor Philippines is a Philippine television reality competition show broadcast by GMA Network. The show is based from the Swedish television series Robinson. Originally hosted by Paolo Bediones, it premiered on September 15, 2008, on the network's Telebabad line up. The show concluded on February 19, 2012, with a total of four seasons and 269 episodes. Richard Gutierrez served as the host for the final two seasons.

== Format ==
Hosts

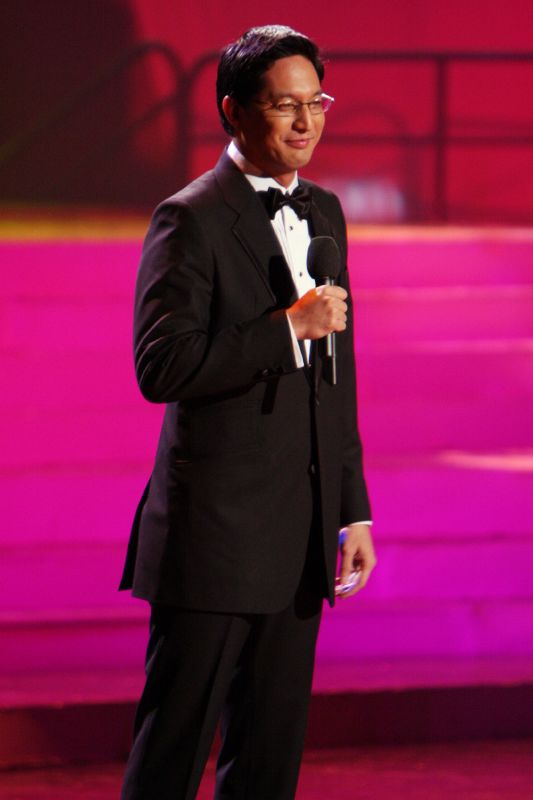
Paolo Bediones

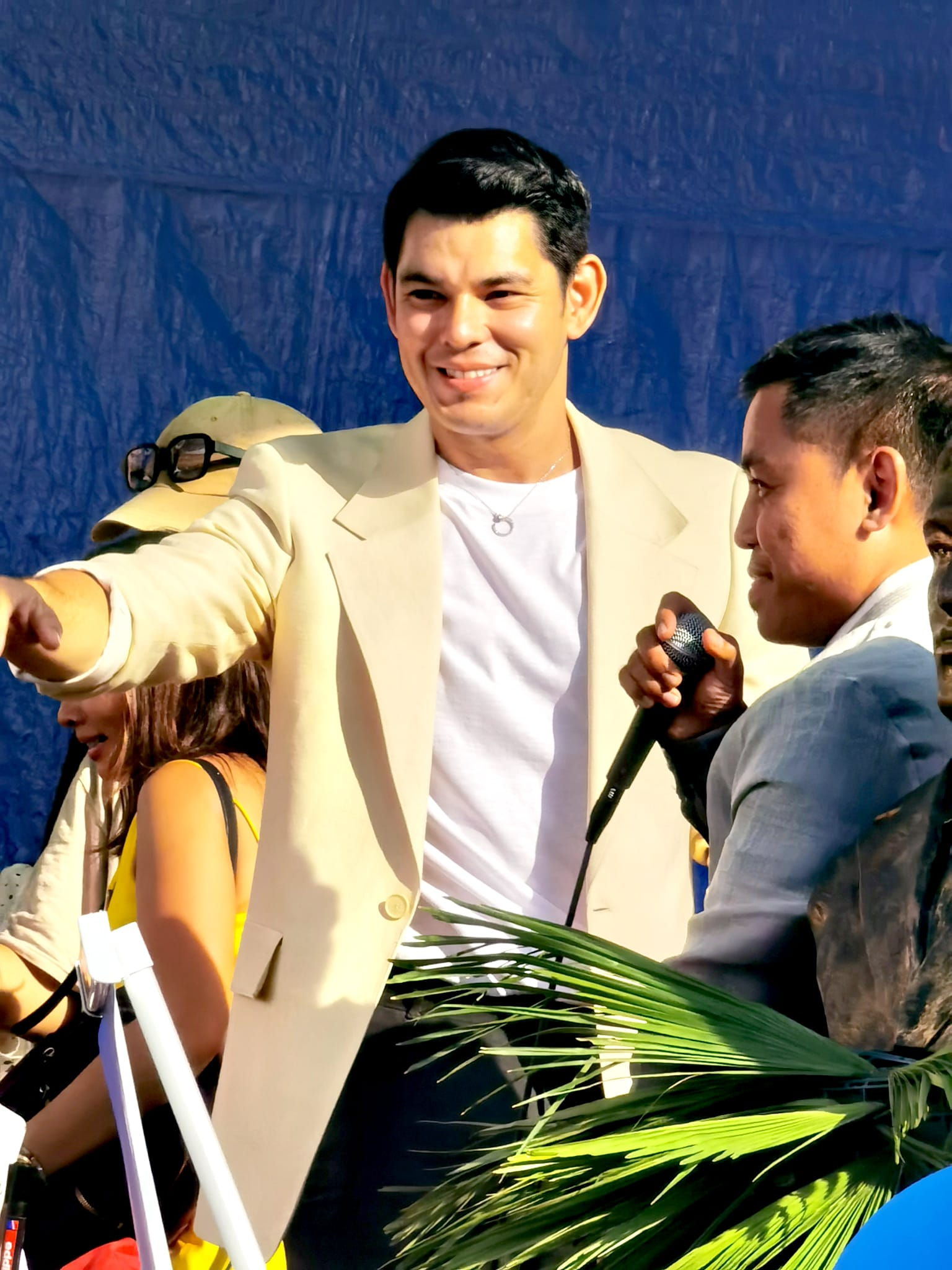
Richard Gutierrez

The show follows the same general format as the other editions of the show. The players are split between two or three "tribes", are taken to a remote isolated location and are forced to live off the land with meager supplies for 39 days (36 in the Celebrity Showdown seasons). Frequent physical and mental challenges are used to pit the teams against each other for rewards, such as food or luxuries, or for "immunity", forcing the other tribe to attend "Tribal Council", where they must vote off one of their members.

When 10 players are remaining, the tribes are merged into a single tribe, and competitions are on an individual basis; winning immunity prevents that player from being voted out. All of the players that are voted out at this stage form the "Tribal Council jury". Once down to three people (two in the 1st season), a final Tribal Council is held where the remaining players plead their case to the jury as to why they should win the game. The jury then votes for which player should be considered the "Pinoy Sole Survivor" and be awarded the grand prize of three million Philippine pesos.

== Seasons ==
Seasons of Survivor Philippines
Season	Premiere	Finale	Winner	Runners-up	No. of contestants	No. of days	Tribes
Survivor Philippines	September 15, 2008	December 14, 2008	JC Tiuseco	Rob Sy	18	39	Jarakay
Survivor Philippines	September 15, 2008	December 14, 2008	JC Tiuseco	Rob Sy	18	39	Naak
Survivor Philippines	September 15, 2008	December 14, 2008	JC Tiuseco	Rob Sy	18	39	Chalam
Survivor Philippines: Palau	August 17, 2009	November 15, 2009	Amanda Coolley Van Cooll	Justine Ferrer Jef Gaitan	16	39	Airai
Survivor Philippines: Palau	August 17, 2009	November 15, 2009	Amanda Coolley Van Cooll	Justine Ferrer Jef Gaitan	16	39	Koror
Survivor Philippines: Palau	August 17, 2009	November 15, 2009	Amanda Coolley Van Cooll	Justine Ferrer Jef Gaitan	16	39	Isla Purgatoryo
Survivor Philippines: Palau	August 17, 2009	November 15, 2009	Amanda Coolley Van Cooll	Justine Ferrer Jef Gaitan	16	39	Sonsorol
Survivor Philippines: Celebrity Showdown	August 30, 2010	December 5, 2010	Akihiro Sato	Solenn Heussaff Ervic Vijandre	18	36	Magan
Survivor Philippines: Celebrity Showdown	August 30, 2010	December 5, 2010	Akihiro Sato	Solenn Heussaff Ervic Vijandre	18	36	Nagar
Survivor Philippines: Celebrity Showdown	August 30, 2010	December 5, 2010	Akihiro Sato	Solenn Heussaff Ervic Vijandre	18	36	Sar Mayee
Survivor Philippines: Celebrity Showdown	August 30, 2010	December 5, 2010	Akihiro Sato	Solenn Heussaff Ervic Vijandre	18	36	Galone
Survivor Philippines: Celebrity Doubles Showdown	November 14, 2011	February 19, 2012	Betong Sumaya	Mara Yokohama Stef Prescott	20	36	Bulan
Survivor Philippines: Celebrity Doubles Showdown	November 14, 2011	February 19, 2012	Betong Sumaya	Mara Yokohama Stef Prescott	20	36	Tala
Survivor Philippines: Celebrity Doubles Showdown	November 14, 2011	February 19, 2012	Betong Sumaya	Mara Yokohama Stef Prescott	20	36	Apolaki

== Deviations ==
Locations of Survivor Philippines. Seasons are represented accordingly by numbers.

The show was aired on a daily basis rather than once a week, all elements of the Survivor franchise were otherwise present. The show uses the theme music for the British version composed by Russ Landau, who made the Ancient Voices series of theme scores for the American version. It has further been re-arranged and added with tribal and ethnic flavors by local Filipino composer Diwa de Leon and chant vocals were performed by Evan Britanico.

One unique difference in this franchise is in the status of castaways who are evacuated to the hospital nearest to the setting of the game. Instead of being declared as eliminated at the point of evacuation, a castaway being sent to the hospital due to apparent injury or ailment is reminded to return to the game within 24 hours; otherwise, they are officially declared as eliminated from the game. One exception was with Survivor Philippines: Celebrity Doubles Showdown castaway, Stef Prescott, who had been brought to a hospital in Manila after she was bitten by a Philippine cobra at Bulan camp. She was on treatment and observation for two days. Throughout the two-day absence from the game, she missed the actual Tribal Shuffle twist, a Tribal Immunity Challenge, and a Tribal Council. She came back on Day 13. Of the eight castaways across four seasons so far who were sent to the hospital with this reminder, all returned to the game, with one (Niña Ortiz from the first season) deciding to leave soon after her return from the hospital due to injury.

Another deviation in this franchise is the choice of the merge name, which is done beforehand by the producers. The merged tribe's name normally follows the naming pattern of those of the initial competing tribes. Many other Survivor versions usually let members of the new merged tribe make up their new tribal name.

In another deviation, the reunion specials were pre-recorded and were aired in the first Sunday after the final results were announced, which commonly happened in Fridays. One exception was with the reunion special of the fourth season, to be aired in the second Sunday after the live finale. In the American editions, the reunion special is usually aired live immediately after the final results are announced.

== Ratings ==
Television ratings are according to AGB Nielsen Philippines' Mega Manila household ratings.
Season	Premiere rating	Finale rating	Reunion rating
1	31.8%	35.0%	18.1%
2	30.8%	31.3%	7.8%
3	18.2%	—N/a	—N/a
4	24.2%	34.7%	19.1%

== Accolades ==
Accolades received by Survivor Philippines
Year	Award	Category	Recipient	Result	Ref.
2009	23rd PMPC Star Awards for Television	Best Reality Program Host	Paolo Bediones	Won	
2009	14th Asian Television Awards	Best Adaptation of an Existing Format	Survivor Philippines episode 1	Nominated	
2010	6th USTv Students' Choice Awards	Students' Choice of Reality Show	Survivor Philippines	Won	
2010	K-Zone Awards	Fave Reality Show	Survivor Philippines	Nominated	
2011	Golden Screen TV Awards	Outstanding Adapted Reality / Competition Program	Survivor Philippines: Celebrity Showdown	Won	
2011	Golden Screen TV Awards	Outstanding Adapted Reality / Competition Program Host	Richard Gutierrez	Nominated	
2011	Gawad Tangi Awards for Television	Best Reality Program (Adapted)	Survivor Philippines: Celebrity Showdown	Won	
2011	Gawad Tangi Awards for Television	Best Reality Program Host (Adapted)	Richard Gutierrez	Nominated	
2012	17th Asian Television Awards	Best Adaptation of an Existing Format	Survivor Philippines: Celebrity Doubles Showdown	Nominated	
2013	Golden Screen TV Awards	Outstanding Adapted Reality / Competition Program	Survivor Philippines: Celebrity Doubles Showdown	Won	
2013	Golden Screen TV Awards	Outstanding Adapted Reality / Competition Program Host	Richard Gutierrez	Nominated	
