= Survivor Philippines season 1 =

Season of a Philippine television reality show

Survivor Philippines
- Season 1
- Title card
- Presented by: Paolo Bediones
- No. of days: 39
- No. of castaways: 18
- Winner: JC Tiuseco
- Runner-up: Robert Vincent "Rob" Sy
- Location: Ko Tarutao, Satun Province, Thailand
- No. of episodes: 65 + 1 Reunion Special

Release
- Original release: September 15 – December 14, 2008

Additional information
- Filming dates: July 21 – August 29, 2008

Season chronology
- Next → Palau

The first season of Survivor Philippines premiered on September 15, 2008, and ended its run on December 14 of the same year, when John Carlo "JC" Tiuseco, defeating Robert Vincent "Rob" Sy in a vote of 7–2. Auditions for this season were held in six Philippine cities in May 2008. From these auditions, 18 contestants were selected to participate on the show in June 2008. The show was filmed in Ko Tarutao, the same island where Survivor: Thailand took place, from July to August 2008.

== Format changes ==
Although the main format is the same, this season introduced several notable differences from the American version of Survivor:

- Airing format: This season aired five times a week, compared to the once-weekly airing schedule of the American version. The American version largely produces one episode for every three days, culminating in an elimination; this season had 65 episodes, with between four and six episodes for every three days.
- Black and white pearls: Small trinkets roughly the size of a standard billiard ball. After the merge, each voted out contestant was to assign one of the pearls to a remaining castaway. The castaway who receives the black pearl automatically receives a penalty vote at the following Tribal Council; if the pearl is lost, the holder would then receive two votes. The castaway who receives the white pearl will have one vote against them at the next Tribal Council nullified.
- Public jury vote: Viewers were given the opportunity to vote through SMS between which of the two finalists they wanted to win the game. The finalist with the most overall votes received an extra vote to win on behalf of the viewing public.

== Contestants ==
The castaways were initially divided into tribes by gender: Jarakay (Thai: จระเข้, lit. 'crocodile') composed of the nine male contestants, and Naak (Thai: นาค, lit. 'snake') of the nine females. On Day 3, the real, co-ed tribes were revealed. On Day 19, the ten remaining castaways were merged into Chalam (Thai: ฉลาม, lit. 'shark').

Contestant	Original tribe	Pre-merge tribe	Merged tribe	Finish
Chevyline "Chev" Macias; 26, Iloilo City	Naak	Naak		1st voted out Day 3
Emerson Dino; 31, Caloocan	Jarakay	Naak		2nd voted out Day 6
Ceasar "Gigit" Sulit; 48, Quezon City	Jarakay	Jarakay		3rd voted out Day 9
Jervy "Patani" Daño; 20, Talisay, Cebu	Naak	Jarakay		4th voted out Day 9
Maria Nona "Niña" Ortiz; 40, Quezon City	Naak	Jarakay		Left due to injury Day 11
Vevherly "Vevh" Gador; 20, Alcantara, Cebu	Naak	Naak		5th voted out Day 12
John Anthony Lopez; 27, Bicol	Jarakay	Jarakay		6th voted out Day 15
Leona Rica "Nikki" Dacullo; 21, Tacloban City, Leyte	Naak	Jarakay		7th voted out Day 18
Reynaldo "Jace" Chanco Flores Jr. 19, Hawaii, USA	Jarakay	Jarakay	Chalam	8th voted out 1st jury member Day 21
Raymund Francis "Kiko" Rustia; 27, Quezon City	Jarakay	Naak	Chalam	9th voted out 2nd jury member Day 24
Veronica "Vern" Domingo; 29, Bacoor, Cavite	Naak	Jarakay	Chalam	10th voted out 3rd jury member Day 26
Marlon Carmen; 31, Parañaque	Jarakay	Jarakay	Chalam	11th voted out 4th jury member Day 29
Kristina "Kaye" Alipio; 20, Calamba, Laguna	Naak	Naak	Chalam	12th voted out 5th jury member Day 32
Zita Ortiga; 43, Pasay	Naak	Naak	Chalam	13th voted out 6th jury member Day 35
Crisanto "Cris" Cartagenas; 30, Metro Manila	Jarakay	Naak	Chalam	14th voted out 7th jury member Day 37
Anna Charisse Yacapin; 27, Makati	Naak	Jarakay	Chalam	15th voted out 8th jury member Day 38
Robert Vincent "Rob" Sy; 30, Davao City	Jarakay	Naak	Chalam	Runner-up
John Carlo "JC" Tiuseco; 23, Metro Manila	Jarakay	Naak	Chalam	Sole Survivor

== Season summary ==
Challenge winners and eliminations by cycle
Episodes		Challenge winner(s)		Eliminated	Finish
No.	Original air dates	Reward	Immunity	Eliminated	Finish
1–5	September 15 to 19, 2008	Jarakay	Jarakay	Chev	1st voted out Day 3
6–10	September 22 to 26, 2008	Jarakay	Jarakay	Emerson	2nd voted out Day 6
11–16	September 29 to October 3, & October 6, 2008	Jarakay	Naak	Gigit	3rd voted out Day 9
11–16	September 29 to October 3, & October 6, 2008	Jarakay	Naak	Patani	4th voted out Day 9
17–20	October 7 to 10, 2008	Jarakay	Jarakay	Niña	Left due to injury Day 11
17–20	October 7 to 10, 2008	Jarakay	Kiko (Note: Kiko was "kidnapped" by Jarakay, granting him exemption from that night's Tribal Council.)	Vevherly	5th voted out Day 12
20–25	October 13 to 17, 2008	Naak	Naak	John	6th voted out Day 15
26–30	October 20 to 24, 2008	Naak	Naak	Nikki	7th voted out Day 18
31–35	October 27 to 31, 2008	None (Note: There was no reward challenge because of the merge.)	Zita	Jace	8th voted out 1st jury member Day 21
36–41	November 3 to 7 & November 10, 2008	Survivor; Auction	Veronica	Kiko	9th voted out 2nd jury member Day 24
41–45	November 10 to 14, 2008	JC [Cris, Kaye, Rob]	Charisse	Veronica	10th voted out 3rd jury member Day 26
46–51	November 17 to 21 & November 24, 2008	Cris	JC (Note: For winning the immunity challenge, JC earned an additional reward, which he shared with Cris and Marlon.)	Marlon	11th voted out 4th jury member Day 29
51–53	November 24 to 26, 2008	Rob	JC	Kaye	12th voted out 5th jury member Day 32
54–57	November 27 & 28, December 1 & 2, 2008	Zita [Cris]	Cris	Zita	13th voted out 6th jury member Day 35
57–60	December 2 to 5, 2008	Rob [JC]	~~JC~~ (Note: JC won the challenge, but gave immunity to Rob in exchange for an alternate prize, which was a car.) (Rob)	Cris	14th voted out 7th jury member Day 37
60–62	December 5, 8 & 9, 2008	None	Rob	Charisse	15th voted out 8th jury member Day 38
63–65	December 10 to 12, 2008			Jury vote	
63–65	December 10 to 12, 2008			Rob	Runner-up
63–65	December 10 to 12, 2008			JC	Sole Survivor

In the case of multiple tribes or people who win reward or immunity, they are listed in order of finish, or alphabetically where it was a team effort; where one player won and invited others, the invitees are in brackets.

=== Days 1–3 (Episodes 1–5) ===
- Immunity Challenge: One tribe member would sit inside a portable "spirit house", to be transported by six others. The eighth tribe member would be the puzzle solver, while the ninth acts a reserve who will take over a transporter who wants to rest. The seven tribe members transporting the spirit house will cross a course. Along the way are six stations, each with a bag of puzzle pieces for each tribe. Once at the station, the spirit house passenger must retrieve the tribe's bag. Once all puzzle pieces are gathered and the spirit house brought to the tribe's mat, the puzzle solver picks up the puzzle pieces and solves the puzzle: a Thai stupa. The puzzle solver who constructs their stupa first wins immunity for their tribe.

Day 1: The castaways were brought to the island by boat, but stopped several meters from shore. They were then told to jump out of the boat with the clothes they were wearing and swim to shore, which the castaways did. Moreover, Paolo said that only those castaways who can swim to the shore will make it to Survivor. After all castaways arrive on shore, Paolo separated the castaways into tribes by gender: the men make up Jarakay while the women compose Naak. Since Jace was the one who arrived to shore first, the Jarakay tribe would have the bigger camp.

- Reward Challenge: Eight of the nine castaways are harnessed together while the ninth will be the "keykeeper" who will release their tribemates. The tribes will cross an obstacle course composed of a one-pole bridge and a zip line, and the end of each is a pole containing a set of keys that will release the restraints of each tribe member. At the end of the obstacle course, tribes will gather puzzle pieces from bags hanging on a large web. Once all puzzle pieces are retrieved, one tribe member will solve the puzzle, which is a picture of an eagle. First tribe with a solved puzzle wins the reward.
  - Reward: Additional materials for setting up camp
  - Punishment: The members of the entire tribe would be harnessed together until the next day

The Reward Challenge then took place, in which the men lead the entire time and won, although the women slowly caught up with the men. After the challenge, both tribes head to their camps and each opened the tribal boxes which contained additional clothes and footwear and some raincoats. Though there was some effort, the members of both tribes slept in their raincoats on the sand in the pouring rain without setting up their shelters.

Day 2: Work on the Jarakay men's camp started while the Naak women divided their work on building their shelter, gathering food, and starting fire. Later, several of the Jarakay men finally found their water source, while Naak rested with Patani imitating the StarStruck spiel. After the women were relieved of their harnesses, they went back to work. Back in Jarakay, after finally deciding that Gigit would be the "mediator" of the tribe and some heated discussion on where to place the shelter, the shelter was finally built at the shore line near the water source. Later, Marlon complained to Cris about them and Emerson being easy pickings by being the hunters of the tribe. After the shelter was finished, Gigit announced that he would relinquish his "mediator" role to Kiko, which the entire tribe accepted, although Jace thought of it as a ploy for votes. In Naak, most of the women rested more, leaving the harder work to Patani and Zita. Meanwhile, in Jarakay, everyone feasted on raw fish. Food-sensitive JC, after having a nip of his piece, vomited afterwards.

Day 3: During the distribution of the tribal buffs, it was revealed that Emerson, Rob, Cris, Kiko, and JC were transferred to Naak, while Veronica, Nikki, Patani, Charisse, and Niña went to Jarakay. The Immunity Idol, a statue of the god Garuda, was then revealed. During the Immunity Challenge, Naak led initially but strayed and later stopped because JC asked to be replaced by Emerson in carrying the spirit house, saying he was tired. Jarakay took the lead and was the first team to start their puzzle. Naak slowly caught up, but lost because Kaye, Naak's puzzle solver, was unable to pull out the final piece of the puzzle from the bag, enabling Jarakay's puzzle solver Niña to win immunity for her tribe. Upon return to the Jarakay tribe, the new women were amazed at the organization of the camp and of the chores. Attempts of making fire were futile. A budding relationship was also formed between Jace and Veronica. In Naak, work on the shelter finally went underway. There were also rumors about either JC or Chev being slated to be voted out. Emerson and Kiko formed an alliance and Emerson influenced his tribemates on how they would vote. It seemed to work as Chev was unanimously voted out 8-1.

=== Days 4–6 (Episodes 6–10) ===
- Reward Challenge: Carrying a torch, the tribe must row their boat toward a lighted lotus, from which they would get their flame using their torch. They will use their flame to light the next six lotuses. Afterwards, they will row their boat to a flag and swim underwater in two groups of three to untie two foot stools. The foot stools will be used as transport to bring two assigned crossers from the tower with the large platform to the one with the medium platform, and then to the one with the small platform. Once both crossers are on the small platform, the entire tribe must gather on top of the tower with their feet on the small platform. The first tribe that does this wins the reward.
  - Reward: A piece of flint.
  - Mini-Reward Challenge: After losing in the Reward Challenge, the members of Naak swam out on a deep part of the water and floated on its surface each keeping a matchstick dry. Any tribe member who sank, touched the body of the boats, or deliberately quit was out of the challenge. Any tribe member who kept the matchstick dry for 15 minutes could take those matchsticks back to camp. Naak took home six such matchsticks.
- Immunity Challenge: There are five rings, each with a "Thai pillow" (a triangular prismic pillow) buried under the sand. In each round, one or more members of each tribe must unearth the pillow from one ring and bring it to their tribal mat. While wrangling is inevitable, inflicting injury is not allowed. Once the pillow is brought to one tribe's mat, that tribe gains one point; even touching the mat, regardless of whose foot is touching it, counts. The first tribe that gains three points wins Immunity.

Night of Day 3: The Naak tribe returned to their camp from Tribal Council as they started to doubt Emerson's actions, causing distrust on him because of his claim that he had no idea how to definitely play the game.

Day 4: Still with no fire, the Jarakay tribe started to talk about food, considering that they haven't eaten properly for days. In the Reward Challenge, because of some steering problems and tight ropes in Naak's front, Jarakay easily won the challenge just as Naak started to catch up. After Jarakay returned to camp, they started attempting to have fire with their new flint. Meanwhile, in Naak, Cris and Kiko discussed the confusion over who sits where and over steering the boat that caused Naak to lose the Reward Challenge, particularly on Cris's career as a professional driver and Kiko's experience as a dragon boat racer. The discussion became heated that Rob stepped in to pacify the situation. Three of Naak's strike-anywhere matchsticks were used up without success.

Day 5: After several attempts, Jarakay finally had fire, enabling the tribe to cook food and boil water. In an aspiration to gain allies, Marlon showed off his cooking prowess. Meanwhile, Zita's efforts to bring flame to Naak also paid off when she lighted the tribe's penultimate matchstick. Back in Jarakay, Marlon and Jace talked about a secret voting alliance composed of the men and Veronica. Later, after much discussion of taking Niña's suggestion, the roof of Jarakay's shelter was finally made waterproof using bamboo. During the fourth round of the Immunity Challenge, when all of Naak and all of Jarakay (save for Niña) faced off, Veronica's nose bled and John's arm was almost twisted. After Vevherly and Cris were sent back to their tribal mat, Vevherly complained to Cris about Emerson's treatment of her, especially during the match-up. In the end, Jarakay won 3-1. After both tribes returned to their camps, each discussed to each other what had just happened in the Immunity Challenge. Additionally, Patani also related her desire for exposure, even showing her acting prowess.

Day 6: Despite Emerson's efforts to redeem himself by helping around the camp, it was already apparent that he was the next one to leave the camp. As the day progressed, emotions soared to the point that Zita and Vevherly hugged each other (as Zita thought she would be the next to be voted out); the others shared their sympathy as Emerson expressed his amazement at the Survivor concept. During Tribal Council, discussions were made about the Immunity Challenge and the hostilities that had happened. After the votes were tallied, Emerson was eliminated as expected, 6-1-1.

=== Days 7–9 (Episodes 11–16) ===
- Reward Challenge: Three "Muscles," both sexes represented, hold on to their tribe's own basket using ropes while four "shooters" shoot coconuts at the opposing tribe's basket. Because the number of coconuts are limited, the shooters are given thirty seconds to recover coconuts that miss the baskets to be re-used upon resumption of the challenge. Once one tribe's basket touches the ground, the other tribe wins the Reward.
  - Reward: Two large fish in addition to the tribe's luxury items.
- Immunity Challenge: A giant roulette is used to determine what a pair of tribe members, one from each tribe, will eat from a selection of so-called "creepy crawlies." Each pair will eat the selected food. The first person to finish the selected food and show an empty mouth wins a point for their tribe. First tribe to receive five points wins immunity.

Night of Day 6: After returning to camp, the Naak discussed how Emerson's overall strategy, especially during the Immunity challenge, backfired on him, causing his elimination.

Day 7: While the rest of Naak were having fun, Rob noticed Zita in her moment of solitude, confused after voting against Kaye at Tribal Council. Meanwhile, during Jarakay's pre-challenge meal, Marlon divulged to his tribemates on how to deal with Kiko, leading John to believe that Marlon had issues with Kiko. They then smothered parts of their bodies with crude designs using charcoal in what Marlon later described to Paolo as "Spartan." During the Reward Challenge, Jarakay was able to shoot 37 coconuts against Naak's 27 bringing the latter's basket to the ground. Thus, the Reward went to Jarakay. Both tribes, however, received their luxury items. After returning to camp, the Jarakay tribe started on how to cook one of their new fish. Meanwhile, the other women in Jarakay formed their own alliance. Later in the evening, after showing their luxury items, Patani showed her scapular to her tribemates, then went on another acting binge. Meanwhile, in Naak, Kiko was alerted by an appearance of a snake in camp, which he handled and planned to release in the morning.

Day 8: Kiko played around with the snake and made it the unofficial tribal pet, since Naak's tribal flag has a snake on it. In Jarakay, the two alliances started plotting on who to vote out from Jarakay first, with Niña being targeted by the men and Veronica, and Gigit by the other women. Marlon admitted that he was already torn between the two alliances, thus enabling to balance the situation and confuse both alliances. In the Immunity Challenge, the win-hungry Naak won easily over Jarakay, 5-0, handing the other tribe their first trip to Tribal Council. Naak went back to their camp happy and frolicking after winning their first ever challenge. Meanwhile, in Jarakay, the men's alliance, which includes Veronica, decided to shift their focus from Niña to Patani. John laid down at the shelter and complained that he was not feeling well, probably because of the fumes from the camp fire he was tending. Emergency personnel were alerted and John was rushed to the nearest hospital. As a double blow to Jarakay, their pot cracked, forcing them to improvise in cooking food.

Day 9: After a night of celebration, life at Naak continued as usual, oblivious to the events at the other camp. At Jarakay, Marlon started to plot his moves as a double agent by talking to Charisse and Niña about their vote on the upcoming Tribal Council. The men's alliance was also thinking about altering their strategy if and when John did not come back to camp. As Charisse was starting to talk about John, John came back to the island after a night in the hospital, telling his tribemates that his collapse the day before was caused by his low potassium levels. The rest of the Jarakay tribe welcomed him back with open arms. At Naak, the tribe was gathering their things to slightly higher ground as the tide began to recede towards camp. Back at Jarakay, the men's alliance decided to stick with their choice of voting out Patani. At Tribal Council, an activity was held at which one member was out of the Tribal Council area as the others would talk about that person. Afterwards, there was also talk about how they lost in the last Immunity Challenge and how everyone had changed during the second Immunity Challenge on Day 5. After the voting, Gigit was surprisingly voted out, 8-1. After Gigit left, Paolo told the remaining Jarakay members to stay on for another round of voting. In the resulting tally, Patani was eliminated, 3-2-2-1. Because of the wide distribution of the votes, Paolo reminded the tribe to step up as one.

=== Days 10–12 (Episodes 17–20) ===
- Reward Challenge: One "Clipper" and one tribe member wearing a harness will run to a pole with a cloth wrapped around it and a clip on one end. That clip is latched onto the harnessed tribe member and is wrapped around the said tribe member; only the Clipper is allowed to touch the cloth at all times. At the other end of the cloth is another clip to be latched on the next harnessed tribe member. The process is repeated in the next four poles until all five pieces of cloth are wrapped around the five harnessed tribe members. Afterwards, the pieces of cloth are unwrapped, unlatched from the harnessed tribe members, reconnected to each other, and spread out from the fifth pole back to the starting line by the clipper. The first tribe that has all five connected cloth pieces laid out and with all members on the tribal mat wins the Reward.
  - Reward: Pillows and a large hammock. Additionally, the winning tribe can kidnap a member of the losing tribe. The abducted tribe member would stay with his/her captors for an entire day and when the abductee's tribe loses the next Immunity Challenge, the abductee is exempted from the next Tribal Council.
- Immunity Challenge: In a series of 3-on-3 matches, each team has to push their large ball across a watery field into their opponents' goal, while preventing the opponents from doing the same. Since two sets of two balls for each tribe are deployed, the first two rounds involve one ball going to the opponents' goal while the third involves moving both balls into the opponents' goal, not necessarily at one time. Opponents can only hold each other on the waist and riding on the ball is not allowed. First tribe to score two points wins immunity.

Day 10: Several Jarakay members started to plan out further tactics for the next time they would visit Tribal Council, while others, such as Niña, felt remorse due to what happened the night before. In Naak, Rob, Cris, and even Kiko played around with their tribe's crate by turning it into a boat. Kaye also read her tribemates palms using her knowledge in basic palmistry. In the Reward Challenge, Naak initially led, but Jarakay caught up and eventually won. Because of the additional stipulation, Jarakay decided to abduct Kiko. Back at Jarakay, all tribe members stood back as Kiko attempted to light up the camp's fire. At Naak, the members of the tribe started to miss Kiko, whom they regarded as an asset.

Day 11: While the rest of Naak was gathering food, JC had to temporarily pull out of the game because of an infected insect bite. In Jarakay, Niña had to do the same thing because of what she thought was a dislocated toe that she attained during the Reward Challenge. Niña's toe turned out to be fractured and a cast had to be applied for it to heal. Back at Jarakay, the tribe members continued to watch their moves, careful not to show any weakness to Kiko. Later, members of both tribes smothered themselves with orange and pink body paint in preparation for the upcoming Immunity Challenge. Before the start of the Immunity Challenge, JC and Niña arrived from the hospital and Niña announced her complete departure from the game due to her fractured toe. Nonetheless, the Immunity Challenge went on with Jarakay winning 2-1. Worse, Naak was told to move their camp to a new location. Back at Jarakay, Kiko helped build the fire and put some of it on the shelter to warm all of them. At Naak, Vevherly was worried that she was already next. Rob even noted that Vevherly had a slight fever when she was sleeping in the crate.

Day 12: While preparing for Naak's move, Vevherly expressed to Kaye that she had given up on the game, even telling her that Survivor is a "rich man's game." At Jarakay, the cracks on their pot became a large hole, rendering it useless. Marlon used a stem of bamboo to make an improvised pot. Kiko eventually warmed himself up to Jarakay, to the point that he settled his differences with Jace and Marlon. Naak, meanwhile, set up their new camp at a thickly forested area. Vevherly, who had lost all enthusiasm, even refused to eat and request medical attention for her wounds. At Tribal Council, Naak discussed how Kiko's absence affected life at camp while Kiko talked about his experience at the Jarakay camp. In another twist, the entire Jarakay tribe also showed up in Tribal Council to observe and hear what the other tribe had to say about them. After the votes were counted, Vevherly was voted out, 5-1.

=== Days 13–15 (Episodes 21–25) ===
- Reward Challenge: Each tribe will be composed of five swimmers and one puzzle solver. Each swimmer will grab a stick, swim out to a platform and use the stick to break a skull which contains a key. The key should be retrieved and brought back to shore before the next swimmer can begin. In case a swimmer cannot make it back to shore, a three-minute penalty will be imposed before the next swimmer enters the water. Once all six keys are retrieved, the puzzle solver would use them to open boxes containing pieces to a four-sided puzzle. The first puzzle solver to finish the puzzle wins the Reward for their tribe.
  - Reward: Two lechon de leche (roasted suckling pigs), complemented with dipping sauce, rice, and pitchers of water.
- Immunity Challenge: The members of each tribe, harnessed to one another, move around a circuit amid a rising tide, each carrying a bag weighing 10 pounds. The tribes chase each other until the tribe member in front tags the trailing member of the opposing tribe. At this point, the tagged tribe member passes his bag to a fellow tribe member still in play, and is put in a cage. The tribes are then repositioned for the next cycle. The first tribe to eliminate all members of the opposing tribe wins immunity.

Night of Day 12: Paolo revealed to Naak the purpose of Jarakay's presence in Tribal Council: Naak would stay at the Jarakay camp. When both tribes returned to Jarakay's camp, Marlon entertained the members of Naak, even as his tribemates slept. He also joined the members of Naak in sleeping outside the Jarakay shelter.

Day 13: Marlon continued his connection with Naak when he joined Cris, Zita, and Veronica in gathering food. Appropriately, on Cris's birthday, Naak won the Reward Challenge, with Jarakay's loss caused mainly by Marlon's inability to dive into deeper water to retrieve a key. While the members of Jarakay watched as those of Naak ate their reward, Rob made side comments that to Kiko sounded insensitive. Back at Jarakay, the tribe members had another meal of rice and snails. They then talked about what went wrong at the Reward Challenge, and later Charisse entertained her tribemates due to boredom. At Naak's new camp, Kiko reminded his tribemates to be more humble in their ways, which Rob did not take easily. They then proceeded in making their new shelter. Kiko later made up with Rob to prevent further hostilities. At night, Rob dried some pieces of dirty laundry over the open fire.

Day 14: In the Immunity Challenge, even with Zita and Kaye falling down repeatedly, Naak easily won over Jarakay. Back at the Jarakay camp, John and Jace figured that their recent losses can be attributed to their slowly weakening state. At Naak, just before nightfall, Kiko prepared the ponchos, anticipating rain. A sudden rainfall occurred, and JC and Kiko had to shield the fire. Meanwhile, Kaye caught a glimpse of a strange figure for approximately five seconds, which she described was of a fully clothed man.

Day 15: In Jarakay, while preparing a new bamboo stalk to cook rice in, Marlon cut his finger with a machete, going to the water source to wash his wound. At Naak, work on the shelter's roof continued as the rain continued pouring. Insect bites and rashes also began to plague both tribes. Back in Naak, Kiko, Rob, and JC talked about their post-merge plans in the game and the current flaws in Jarakay's state of affairs. In Jarakay, there was talk that Nikki would be next due to her lack of contributions to the tribe. There was also concern for the further deterioration of John's health due to the lack of food. In Tribal Council, while most did not like Nikki to stay longer, health won over merit as John was voted out 5-1.

=== Days 16–18 (Episodes 26–30) ===
- Reward Challenge: Four tribe members would each collect as much mud from a mud pit as one can and let a fifth member extract the mud to a collection bucket, which in turn have its contents transferred to a clean bucket. The bucket will be deemed completely full if it becomes heavy enough to pull a weight to the top. The first tribe to fill five clean buckets with mud wins the Reward.
  - Reward: An on-the-spot bathing and toothbrushing session, using toiletries from Unilever.
- Immunity Challenge: The members of each tribe, each smothered with oil, would stand across a balance beam. The member nearest to the edge must cross the beam, straddling their tribemates in the process, to the center platform. Leaning forward and crouching way too low is not allowed. First tribe to have all five members on the center platform wins immunity.

Day 16: Jace took John's departure hard as evidenced by his transformation from virtual helper to just idler. In Naak, Cris further proved his worth by cooking the rice before everyone else woke up. Zita noted the scarcity of edible sealife in their new camp compared to their old one. In the Reward Challenge, Naak once again dominated Jarakay, 5-3. Like the end of the previous reward challenge, Jarakay watched as Naak had their bath. In Jarakay, Jace, a mixed martial arts fighter, showed some moves to Marlon. Veronica, a taekwondo coach, briefly joined the two by showing her roundhouse kicks to them. At Naak, Rob, Cris, and Kaye frolicked by imitating characters from the Starzan franchise (Joey de Leon's parody of the Tarzan franchise). At Jarakay, while rain was falling down, Marlon, Jace, and Veronica, donned in their ponchos, traded ghost stories to amuse themselves.

Day 17: Marlon noticed that Jace had become more lazier since the day before. Both tribes were given sheets of paper and pencils to write letter for their love ones at home. At Naak, Cris, Rob, and Kaye continue their frolicking by playing in the rain. Meanwhile, the members of Jarakay noted their wound and bruises that they had attained within the last few days. Charisse also noticed that no other message arrived for the entire day, keeping them in the dark about future events. Back at Naak, Kaye had also saw changes in her looks.

Day 18: Charisse noticed that Jace's efforts to stay on did not mask his longing for home. She had also started to catch the same kind of seafood Marlon was catching. At Naak, longing for food was also evident and Zita finding a small edible shellfish did not help. At the Immunity Challenge, Naak easily won their fourth challenge in a row while Veronica was still straddling her four tribemates. Back at the Jarakay camp, Marlon once again played double agent when he handled different opinions to Veronica and Charisse on who to vote out; he was also considerate about the upcoming merge. At Naak, Kaye reported that her tribe must show up at Tribal Council as well. But when she also mentioned that it was just a joke, the men lifted her off the ground to force out the truth. At Tribal Council, talk was about the weakening of the tribe, the loved ones they had missed, etc. In an event similar to one occurring six days before, Naak also showed so they would hear what Jarakay would have to say about them. Voting occurred and Nikki was voted out 4-1.

=== Days 19–21 (Episodes 31–35) ===
- Immunity Challenge: The castaways, who are shackled at the wrists, must dig their way under the first cage. The first five to do so will then step into the second cage. They will then use sticks and rope to make a makeshift extending arm to retrieve a key, unlock one wrist shackle, and dig their way into the third cage, making through a maze of haphazardly placed wooden sticks and racing to the mat. The first castaway to have both feet on the mat wins Immunity.

Night of Day 18: The members of Naak assessed the current state of affairs in the other tribe. Meanwhile, in Jarakay, Jace told his plans to bring in JC and Cris to the male Jarakay alliance, which Marlon interpreted as a sign of Jace's immaturity.

Day 19: Veronica, Marlon, and Charisse noted Jace's increasing laziness and sadness, knowing to them that he was even worse than Nikki. While the same treemail arrived at both camps, Naak interpreted it as one about castaways who were already voted out, while Jarakay saw it as a fire-making challenge. When the two tribes converged at the appointed beach, the merge of the tribes into Chalam was announced and a feast was held. Several castaways experienced stomach aches, probably due to overeating the food they had missed eating for 18 days. During this, Jace approached JC to ask him to change his alliances. After the feast, the new Chalam tribe resided on Jarakay's camp and because of the lack of shelter space, Marlon helped Kiko, Cris, and Rob move all of Naak's things, including their shelter to their current camp. Marlon wounded his index finger doing this and ran to shore to wash it. JC used Marlon's absence as an opportunity to warn Kiko, Cris, and Rob about Jace's plan to have JC to switch alliances and help dismantle the Naak front, starting with Kiko. Later, Jace and Marlon talked about their further plans and not bringing in Cris anymore to the Jarakay alliance. After all things were at camp, the tribe members continued their celebration by drinking beer and trading stories, albeit with some strategizing.

Day 20: In the first individual Immunity Challenge, which was related to the island's history as a penal colony, Zita edged Jace, JC, Charisse, and Veronica to win Immunity outright. Back at camp, tasks were once again separated among tribe members. Jace further implicated himself for his laziness after he just stood by in case JC, Cris, and Rob wanted him to help, which never actually happened. Kiko assured several of his fellow Naak members that because of the pact between them, Jace's plan of recruiting Naak members to the Jarakay alliance would eventually fail. In a need for other persons to talk to, Charisse joined Zita and Kaye on the hammock; one end of the hammock snapped in the process. In the evening, Charisse offered Rob to swap places with him so she could sleep beside Kiko. This caused some riotous teasing from everyone else, thinking Charisse was attracted to Kiko.

Day 21: Zita and Charisse talked to each other about their voting options and then made a pinkie promise to each other not to divulge this new knowledge to others. A new treemail arrived, telling the Chalam about a box in which they would put their written concerns. At Tribal Council, the Chalam tribe discussed about what are the qualifications of a Sole Survivor and those of the jury members, as well as what happened in previous days. In the end, JC retracted Jace's offer to join the Jarakay minority as the former Naak members got rid of the lazy yet challenge-threatening Jace, 6-4, something Marlon knew would happen.

=== Days 22–24 (Episodes 36–41) ===
- Survivor Auction: Each contestant will be given ₱500 for every second they lasted underwater; they can only bid in ₱500 increments. Highest bidder gets the item. Survivors may share money, but not with the item. The contestant can win a mystery item which is being bid alone or as one of two options.
  - Reward: Here's what the Survivors won from the auction:
    - Zita: Chocolate cake
    - Charisse: Clubhouse sandwiches and some potato chips (over the power to vote twice in the next Tribal Council)
    - Cris: Milkshake
    - Kaye: Leche flan
    - Kiko: Tamarind shoots (over some crackers and a can of Vienna sausages)
    - Veronica: Half an apple (over a packet of toothpaste and a toothbrush) and a piece of candy
    - JC: Some underwear which he can share with others and an overnight stay in a "secret location" with three companions (Zita, Kiko, and Rob)
    - Marlon: Nothing
    - Rob: Nothing
- Immunity Challenge: Each contestant will stand in a pair of rungs, each an inch wide. In twenty-minute intervals, the contestants must step to a lower set three-fourths of an inch wide and later to the lowest set half an inch wide. They have only 10 seconds to transfer their feet between rung sets and they can only place their hands and forearms against the walls of their spaces. The contestant who touches the ground is eliminated from the challenge. Last one standing wins immunity.

Night of Day 21: After the tribe returned to camp, Rob assured to Cris about sticking together. While everyone else slept, Marlon posed to Rob on what politics would come into play when all Naak members were the only ones left in Chalam and other related tactics in the future.

Day 22: Instead of a Reward Challenge, a Survivor Auction took place wherein the castaways first submerged themselves underwater to earn money for the auction. Several items were bid and won, with JC winning the last one: an overnight stay at a "secret location" outside the island with three companions. He chose Kiko, Zita, and Rob to come with him. After the four were dressed with pants and batik shirts, there were taken away to the so-called secret location. As they were departing, Cris and Kaye wondered why they were not picked by JC while Marlon made a bold declaration that the four who went on the trip would compose the Final Four. The secret location turned out to be a rustic fishing village in a nearby island and the four stayed with the family of a woman named Anoon for a little cultural exchange. Meanwhile, Marlon and Veronica started to convince Cris and Kaye to reconsider their alliance with the four. The convincing indeed got Cris and Kaye thinking about their relationship with their fellow Naak members.

Day 23: Because of what happened the night before, Veronica and Charisse told each other that it would be the right time to dispatch JC, Rob, Zita, and Kiko, starting with Kiko and Zita, in that order. Meanwhile, while bathing in preparation for their departure from the village, Zita and Rob each used a bottle of feminine wash on their hair by mistake, thinking it was shampoo; Rob warned JC about this during JC's bath time. The four gave some bracelets to the man of the house and entertained the children. They then thanked their hosts for their hospitality and bade their farewells to them before returning to the island. Upon their return to the island, they shared their experience to their companions, completely unaware of the atrocities cooking up the night before. At the Immunity Challenge, the first seven castaways pulled out due to either temptation or pain, leaving Cris and Veronica in a test of will. Four hours after the challenge began and despite not wanting to disappoint his father, Cris succumbed to the pain and eliminated himself, virtually giving Veronica immunity. Upon return to camp, Cris and Kaye already were talking about Rob's recent lackadaisical attitude towards challenges and their readiness to vote off Kiko. Meanwhile, Rob and Marlon talked about Marlon ready to leave the game in preparation for his birthday and the possibility for Rob to betray his Naak alliance. Both conversations happened within earshot from Kiko and JC.

Day 24: During the day, Rob was already becoming a target by JC and Kiko because of his recent actions. Having secured Cris and Kaye's trust to betray their Naak alliance, Marlon started acting vulnerable, which convinced the people outside his alliance that his elimination from the game would be a good birthday gift for him. At Tribal Council, Cris and Kaye indeed turned their backs on the Naak alliance and Kiko was voted out 5-4. But before Kiko's torch was snuffed, Paolo presented Kiko the Black Pearl and told Kiko to give it to one of the remaining castaways. Kiko gave the pearl to Rob, probably for the latter's recent bumbling attitude. In effect, Rob was guaranteed a vote against him in the next Tribal Council; two if he would lose it.

=== Days 25–26 (Episodes 41–45) ===
- Reward Challenge: The contestants are given a survey to answer privately. Afterwards, the survey questions are then asked again, this time, based on the answers given by the majority of the contestants. Those who are correct will chop a rope connected to a head effigy of a fellow contestant. It takes three hacks of the rope before the effigy falls onto a burning flame, at which point, the contestant represented by the effigy is eliminated from the challenge. Last person with an intact effigy wins the Reward.
  - Reward: A "magic scroll" which tells of an overnight stay in an island resort for its recipient and three other chosen castaways.
- Immunity Challenge: The contestants are shown a row of blocks bearing Thai letters signifying the days of the week. Each contestant would then search seven similar blocks in his/her chosen color scattered around a large area. Coaching and hiding an opponent's block is not allowed. Once the seven blocks are gathered, they are rearranged on the order prescribed. If one does not remember the order, there is a "cheat table" some distance away for guidance. The first contestant with his/her blocks in the correct order wins immunity.

Night of Day 24: The castaways returned to camp with a mix of emotions: Kaye and Charisse were crying, having betrayed Kiko; Zita was confused because of the belief of the Naak alliance's solidness; and Rob was infuriated by the blindside and being the recipient of the Black Pearl, which effectively broke the Naak alliance. Subsequent talk about the previous Tribal Council even made Zita admit that she voted against Marlon, as well as other concerns and what-had-beens.

Day 25: All of the former Naak members had thought about the events in the previous Tribal Council the night before, having realized that Kiko had gone. Rob further suspected traitors in among his Naak tribemates being behind Kiko's ouster and was still mad at why Kiko gave him the Black Pearl. When the latest Tree-mail hinted at revelation of personalities, Marlon became concerned about any negative views against him. He started a shouting match with Zita about violations which became so heated, Rob had to intervene. After some convincing from Rob, Marlon later apologized to Zita when everything calmed and decided to just bear those negative views. JC triumphed at the Reward Challenge and was told to read the magic scroll he won in a later time. The tribe was also presented a plethora of ingredients for the food they would cook back at camp, but not yet eat. Eager to finally have a decent dinner, the castaways returned to camp and set to work on what they thought was an upcoming feast. As they had prepared the resulting dishes, Paolo arrived at camp to tell JC about the contents of the scroll: JC and three chosen companions would take the food with them to a resort and stay there overnight. JC chose Cris, Kaye, and Rob to join him, leaving the envious Marlon, Charisse, Veronica, and Zita to eat rice and some of the meat Rob managed to hide before joining JC. At the resort, Kaye and Cris admitted to JC and Rob about voting against Kiko and subsequently apologized to them about it. Meanwhile, back at camp, Zita voiced her disappointment on JC for not picking her for the reward and made firm to vote out JC next, based on her own feelings, although not completely aligning with the Jarakay alliance.

Day 26: At the resort, JC, Rob, Cris, and Kaye had their breakfast and then headed out to sea for some snorkelling. Back at camp, Marlon, Charisse, and Veronica saw that Zita was finally firm on voting JC out first, then Rob. But with them seeing the possibility of JC winning immunity, Marlon approached Zita to tell her of that and courted the choice of putting Rob's name in the ballot just in case JC would triumph. JC, Rob, Cris, and Kaye rejoined the rest of the Chalam tribe at the site of the Immunity Challenge. At the Immunity Challenge, Zita, Veronica, and Charisse found all seven blocks, but Charisse's blocks were arranged correctly, giving her immunity. Back at camp, Rob related how he concealed the pieces of chicken under the rice before leaving for the resort, while Marlon told Cris about Zita being mad at JC because she was not chosen for the reward. JC and Zita talked about the rift between them, but when they and Cris found out that Marlon misinterpreted her (Zita was just having hard feelings at JC), Marlon was forced to explain himself about the misunderstanding. At Tribal Council, talk was on the previous Tribal Council and the resulting blindside as well as JC's motive not to invite Zita for the last reward. Voting ensued and Veronica was unexpectedly voted off, 5-4. Before her torch was snuffed, Veronica gave the Black Pearl to Charisse, effectively giving her a vote in the next Tribal Council.

=== Days 27–29 (Episodes 46–50) ===
- Reward Challenge: Each contestant will have one attempt to throw a spear towards a laid target. The one who shoots the bull's eyes or whoever lands closest to it wins the Reward.
  - Reward: The power to choose who eats which of these dishes: some steak and rice; teriyaki burger and fries, pizza and pasta, dried fish and tomato, a steamed sweet potato, a tamarind shoot, and a plate of salt. Each dish comes with a beverage: a glass of water with the salt, a bottomless glass of Mountain Dew with the steak and rice, and a glass of a Pepsi product for the others.
- Immunity Challenge: Each contestant will answer a math question concerning numbers derived from past challenges. The contestant will open a box full of rolls of cloth with numbers on them. The roll with the correct number to the math question will contain a key that will unlock the first flag. The first three contestants then traverse a rope onto a second table and a second math question, to be solved the same way as the first to release the second flag. Afterwards, each of the three final contestants will transport three buckets full of stones using bamboo rollers to the finish line. First one to cross the finish line and release the third flag wins both the Reward and Immunity.
  - Additional reward: The opportunity for the winner and two others to watch the video messages from their loved ones in its entirety, and a five-minute call to the winner's loved one courtesy of Smart Communications.

Night of Day 26: As everyone returned to camp, everyone wondered why Veronica gave the Black Pearl to Charisse instead of Marlon. Rob had his first night sleeping without Veronica by his side.

Day 27: While gathering mussels, Charisse told Zita that even she was becoming irritated by Marlon's behavior. In the Reward Challenge, Cris shot the spear nearest to the bull's eye. He decided to keep the steak to himself and give the other meals as respectively follows: the burger to Zita, the pasta and pizza to Kaye, the dried fish to JC, the sweet potato to Rob, and the tamarind to Marlon, leaving Charisse with the salt. Upon return to camp, Marlon was finally feeling the emotion of being disliked among his tribemates. Later, Marlon and Zita found a puffer fish swimming at shore and brought it to camp. And despite the fish being already placed in the pot, nobody dared to even touch it by the scales, let alone cut it up (knowing the fish's toxic properties), so Marlon threw the fish back to sea. When Kaye related at how Rob was undeserving to stay further in the game, Marlon told her of more voting tactics, possibly bringing the momentum back to the Jarakay alliance. In the evening, Rob, Cris, and Marlon amused themselves and their tribemates by acting like openly gay men. The three even imitated the Balakubak segment of the show Nuts Entertainment by whispering and talking to their tribemates about relationships at camp.

Day 28: Cris and Kaye started to talk about Marlon's scare tactics for future Tribal Councils. Before the combined Reward and Immunity Challenge began, the castaways were shown 10-second videos of their loved ones. In the Challenge itself, JC edged Kaye to win Immunity. Also, he was able to watch the entire video message from his girlfriend and chose Cris and Marlon to each watch videos from Cris's mother and Marlon's girlfriend. JC then had a phone call to his girlfriend, who was at the GMA Network Center at the time, to tell her of his win. At camp, Marlon tried to convince Kaye and Cris to sway their votes against JC and Zita. He also revealed to Cris on his intent to hide the flint and put out any embers after the next Tribal Council. But slowly convincing himself that he would be next, he promised Charisse that he would give the Black Pearl to Zita if that would happen. Later however, he had another plan of throwing away the Black Pearl as an "act of goodwill," which the others found absurd. Later in the evening, while everyone else had fun, Cris and Kaye talked about their plan to disband Rob and JC's alliance.

Day 29: During a heavy downpour at low tide, the castaways played tag. Marlon talked to Rob, saying about while keeping his decisions open, Marlon also decided to portray himself as a bad person. Later while preparing the meal to eat, Marlon started to add too much saltwater on the rice, causing him to have a riff with Cris, forcing everyone else to intervene (although this was a plan Marlon and Rob had laid out so Marlon would be targeted in the next Tribal Council). JC also told Charisse that he too was intent on breaking up the Naak alliance. At Tribal Council, Paolo read Zita's willingness to stay in the game because of the numerous problems back home. Paolo also read Marlon's note, stating that Marlon hid the flint and Marlon promised to reveal something more shocking, one that was known only to himself and for his fellow castaways to find out. Probably because of this and other bad deeds Marlon had done, Marlon was unanimously voted out 6-1-1. Ready to receive the Black Pearl, Marlon was instead presented the White Pearl and gave it to Charisse before leaving.

=== Days 30–32 (Episodes 51–53) ===
- Reward Challenge: The contestants are told about the legendary curse of Mahsuri in the island of Pulau Langkawi. They then must go around five stations carrying torches, answering questions about the legend, each question having two possible answers. If they answered correctly, they receive beaded necklaces; otherwise, they receive stringed fangs that they should throw into the fire. One person can occupy a station at a time. The first person to come to the mat with necklaces from the five stations wins the Reward.
  - Reward: ₱50,000 to be wired to loved ones at home, as well as the choice of either bags of coffee, cream, and sugar for the entire tribe or two blankets for one chosen contestant.
- Immunity Challenge: The contestants scale over a wall, walk over a cargo net and retrieve a flag before stepping on a mat. The first four then swim out to sea and over four bamboo poles to retrieve a flag and come back to shore before stepping on a second mat. The first three to do so then dig into a sand pit to find six planks; the color of the plank found determines the colors of the others to be found. When all planks are found, a flag is then raised on a flagpole. The first two to raise their flags then fit the planks into right order while scaling the elephant tower. The first one to pick up the white elephant figure at the top of the elephant tower wins Immunity.

Night of Day 29: The castaways returned to camp during a rainstorm with both of their campfires out. They also surmised that Marlon's plan did not somehow work as flint would not work during a period of rain. They then decided not to find out about whatever Marlon's "revelation" was anymore, as it would not affect the game. They also commented on Veronica's way of dressing and pouting during her presence as a Jury Member in the previous Tribal Council.

Day 30: In the Reward Challenge, while both Rob and Zita obtained five necklaces, Rob went to the mat first and was declared the winner just as Zita realized she had the needed number of necklaces. When Paolo presented Rob the choice of the bags and the blankets, Rob chose the bags of coffee, cream, and sugar. Excited, the tribe brewed their first cups of coffee in a month. They were then reminded of the jury members, particularly on Marlon and Kiko. Later in the evening before going to sleep, Rob gave a thanksgiving prayer for winning the monetary reward to be sent to his family.

Day 31: In the Immunity Challenge, Kaye and Charisse became the first ones to drop out with Rob joining them soon after. JC and Zita dug for some planks while Cris was catching up despite the scrapes on his left thigh. JC went ahead of Zita and Cris to win Immunity.

Day 32: Confusion abounded the Chalam tribe as various castaways planned to vote out either Zita, Kaye or Charisse. Passing time before the visit to Tribal Council, Cris further improved the roof of the shelter. Later, Zita, Kaye, Charisse, and even Cris wore fancy pearl headbands so they would later complement Veronica's stylish entrance as a jury member in the previous Tribal Council, with Cris borrowing some of his female tribemates' tops. But no stylish entrances happened at Tribal Council and Paolo even reminded Cris to be serious as the latter wore Kaye's bikini top upon entering the Tribal Council area before taking it off and donning his shirt. While the women worried that one of them would be voted out, it was Kaye who was eliminated, 4-1. Before having Kaye's torch snuffed, she was given the choice between the Black and White Pearls. She chose the Black Pearl and gave it to Cris. Not wanting to torture himself and his tribemates any further, Cris intentionally threw the Black Pearl into the sea, leaving him vulnerable with two votes against him on the next Tribal Council, unless he would win Immunity.

=== Days 33–35 (Episodes 54–57) ===
- Reward Challenge: A contestant and their loved one form a team. While blindfolded, contestants go into water gathering flags with their loved ones acting as their eyes by shouting directions. The first team with 15 flags wins the Reward.
  - Reward: A one-day trip to Bangkok with their loved one.
- Immunity Challenge: Each contestant stands on an unstable balance platform while holding on to two ropes. After thirty minutes, the contestant lets go of one rope. After another half-an-hour, the contestant is freed of both ropes. Thirty minutes later, the contestant should have a foot off the platform. Crouching and leaning on the scaffold surrounding the platform is allowed, but touching them with one's hands is not. The contestant whose hands touch the platform or scaffold or whose feet step on the mat at the foot of the platform or at the scaffold is eliminated. Last one standing wins Immunity.

Day 33: Rob started to worry about the consequence that Cris was facing after he threw away the pearl. But Cris wasn't concerned about it because of his ulterior plans. Meanwhile, while everyone else chatted, Zita continued to play the role of the tribal servant. Before the start of the Reward Challenge, the castaways reunited with their loved ones: Zita with her son-in-law, Cris with his mother, Rob with his brother, Charisse with her father, and JC with his girlfriend. At the Challenge itself, Zita and her son-in-law triumphed over the other teams. She chose Cris and his mother to come with them to Bangkok. Zita also had JC's girlfriend return with JC, Rob, and Charisse to camp to let her experience life there. En route to their first stopover before going to Bangkok, Cris showed his mother a song he wrote during his life on the island. Back at camp, JC's girlfriend was surprised to hear that neither JC, Charisse, nor Rob could cook rice, so they had crude porridge as their dinner. She also discovered the harsh conditions the castaways were in for the past month.

Day 34: Zita, Cris, and their loved ones arrived in Bangkok by plane and explored the city's sights and sounds. Meanwhile, at camp, JC's girlfriend helped him harvest some sea snails for lunch. She saw how JC, Charisse, and Rob had finally known how to cook rice and later discovered that the castaways prefer their rice slightly burned so they could taste it. As the sun set, JC and his girlfriend had their last moments with each other by swimming at shore. As JC's girlfriend left, she told him how she and his family were proud of his experience in the island. JC, Charisse, and Rob spent the evening chatting about their post-game agenda.

Day 35: Zita and Cris returned from their tour of Bangkok, finally giving a collective sigh of relief for JC, Rob, and Charisse. At the Immunity Challenge, Zita was the first to go, falling off-balance as the ninetieth minute of the Challenge approached; Rob followed soon after. At the fourth hour of the challenge, Charisse also fell from her platform as she tried to adjust her position. After an exchange of gestures between JC and Cris, JC eliminated himself, resulting in Cris's immunity, as well as the negation of the two votes he got after he threw the Black Pearl after the previous Tribal Council. As soon as the castaways returned to camp and were about to sleep, they were told to go to Tribal Council on short notice, giving them no time to strategize. At Tribal Council, Zita, who played according to her heart, was the one voted off, 3-1-1-0.

=== Days 36–37 (Episodes 57–60) ===
- Reward Challenge: The contestants cross a rope bridge using two planks. If one contestant falls off the bridge, he/she must go back to the beginning. After the contestants had crossed the bridge, they fill up the can at one end of a teeter-totter with firewood and set them ablaze. The can at the other end is then filled up with water to raise the can with the fire towards a fuse. The water can has holes on it to empty the water inside. If the fire in the fire can is high enough to light the fuse, the fuse sets off a cauldron of gunpowder at the top. First person to light the cauldron wins the reward.
  - Reward: A dinner and massage at Krabi.
- Immunity Challenge: The contestants go through an obstacle course that uses elements from past challenges: They first roll a large ball to their mat, then unwind a long piece of cloth wrapped around a pole using their bodies, then rolling it out while heading towards a table. At each table are four bugs to be consumed (a gecko, a scorpion, a chameleon, and a millipede). Once the four bugs are eaten, they then climb up a wall and trudge across a cargo net. They then head for a sand pit and dig for seven blocks indicating the days of the week in Thai, putting them in order as one goes along. There is also a cheat table in case one forgets the order. Once the order of blocks is correctly arranged, they then race to the flagpoles to raise a flag. First person to raise his/her flag wins a choice between Immunity and a car (a Honda Civic) with the unclaimed prize given to a chosen fellow contestant.

Night of Day 35: Cris slept early to prepare for the last challenges in the final days of the game.

Day 36: With Zita, the tribe's virtual servant gone, the remaining tribe members finally got to work with JC cooking rice, Charisse foraging for food and Rob helping Cris on camp chores. At the Reward Challenge, JC led, but the others soon caught up. In the end, Rob won the challenge and chose JC to be with him. While JC and Rob were having a decent dinner and some relaxation, Cris complained to Charisse about Rob's ego and later they planned to vote him out.

Day 37: As soon as Rob and JC returned from Krabi, all four castaways competed in the Immunity Challenge, where JC won. When JC was given the choice between immunity and an alternate prize, which was revealed to be a car, JC chose the car and gave immunity to Rob. At Tribal Council, talk was about relationships and the changes the castaways had since the start of the game. After voting, Cris, who whined about JC and Rob's inseparability and trust in each other, was the next one eliminated, 3-1.

=== Day 38 (Episodes 60–62) ===
- Immunity Challenge: Contestants lay on an angled platform with a drum of water at one end; they would hold onto a handle. Every fifteen minutes for three times, the angle of the platform becomes steeper until the contestants fall off the platform's edge. To make the challenge harder, water is poured from the drum to make the platform slippery. Last one standing wins Immunity.

Day 38: Upon waking up and receiving treemail, JC, Charisse, and Rob walked to a spot with a long dining table. There, they ate their first decent breakfast together while being entertained by two traditionally-dressed local dancers. At the final Immunity Challenge held at the beach where the entire game began, Charisse was the first to go, unable to hold her grip. Thirteen minutes later, JC slipped from the platform while trying to shake Rob's hand, making Rob the victor. Upon return to camp at the backdrop of a beautiful sunset, the three remaining castaways had a celebratory swim for being in the game for 38 days. They then reminisced their time in the game before proceeding to Tribal Council. At Tribal Council, Rob decided to continue his friendship and trust with JC and put Charisse into the jury.

=== Day 39 (Episodes 63–65) ===
Night of Day 38: Upon return to camp, which was almost in ruins, the celebratory mood was broken after Rob snapped at the allegation during Tribal Council about immunity being just handed to him in the previous immunity challenge. Wanting Rob to cool himself off, JC just decided to go to sleep.

Day 39: After reading their final treemail that told them to finally abandon their camp, Rob and JC burned both the shelter and their tribal flag, knowing they would never return to it. They then went up a mountain, along the way laying garlands at the torches of their fallen fellow castaways. They reached a porch at the top of the mountain with a lit cauldron and a view of the setting sun. There, following Thai tradition, they released some sky lanterns into the air before going down and proceeding to Tribal Council for the final time. The final Tribal Council, appropriately taking place during a stormy night, saw JC and Rob being barbed by several jury members. After voting took place, Paolo reminded the Final 2 of a popularity poll which would count as a ninth jury vote. Then, following Survivor tradition, Paolo picked up the voting urn and left the Tribal Council area.

Months later, in front of a live audience at the GMA Network Studios in Quezon City, not only did JC win the popularity vote by garnering 93% of it against Rob's 7%, he also ended up as the first Pinoy Sole Survivor, 7-2. He was awarded a check worth three million pesos and a golden pearl (which was the same size as the Black and White Pearls) to symbolize the title.

== Voting history ==
	Pre-merge tribes								Merged tribe								
Episode	5	10	15	16	19	20	25	30	35	41	45	51	53	57		60	62
Day	3	6	9		11	12	15	18	21	24	26	29	32	35		37	38
Eliminated	Chev	Emerson	Gigit	Patani	Niña	Vevherly	John	Nikki	Jace	Kiko	Veronica	Marlon	Kaye	Zita		Cris	Charisse
Votes	8–1	6–1–1	8–1	3–2–2–1	Left (Note: No vote: Niña was left from the game due to injury.)	5–1	5–1	4–1	6–4	5–4	5–4	6–1–1	4–1 (Note: Because Marlon had given Charisse a white pearl, one vote against her was not counted.)	3–1–1–0 (Note: Because Cris won immunity, the two votes against him through the Black Pearl were not counted.)		3–1	1–0
Voter	Votes																
JC	Chev	Emerson				Vevherly			Jace	Marlon	Veronica	Marlon	Kaye	Zita		Cris	None (Note: Charisse and JC were not eligible to vote as the only eligible players they could vote for were each other.)
Rob	Chev	Emerson				Vevherly			Jace	Marlon	Veronica	Marlon	Kaye	Zita		Cris	Charisse
Charisse			Gigit	John			John	Nikki	Kiko	Kiko	Rob	Marlon	Kaye	Zita		Cris	None
Cris	Chev	Emerson				Vevherly			Jace	Kiko	Veronica	Marlon	Charisse	Rob		JC	
Zita	Chev	Kaye				Vevherly			Jace	Marlon	Veronica	Marlon	Kaye	JC			
Kaye	Chev	Emerson				Vevherly			Jace	Kiko	Veronica	Marlon	~~Charisse~~	~~Cris~~	~~Cris~~ (Note: Kaye used an extra vote despite being cursed on a black pearl, therefore six votes were cast in total.)		
Marlon			Gigit	Patani			John	Nikki	Kiko	Kiko	Rob	Cris					
Veronica			Gigit	Niña			John	Nikki	Kiko	Kiko	Rob	Charisse					
Kiko	Chev	Emerson				Kidnap (Note: Although Kiko was physically present in Tribal Council, he was immune from elimination and could not vote due to the stipulation of being Jarakay's captive for a day.)			Jace	Marlon	Rob						
Jace			Gigit	Niña			John	Nikki	Kiko								
Nikki			Gigit	Patani			John	Veronica									
John			Gigit	Patani			Nikki										
Vevherly	Chev	Emerson				Rob											
Niña			Gigit	Nikki													
Patani			Gigit	Nikki													
Gigit			Patani														
Emerson	Chev	Vevherly															
Chev	Kaye																

Jury vote
Episode	65	
Day	39	
Finalist	Rob	JC
Votes	7–2	
Juror	Vote	
Charisse		JC
Cris		JC
Zita	Rob	
Kaye		JC
Marlon		JC
Veronica	Rob	
Kiko		JC
Jace		JC
Public vote (Note: Result of the popularity vote as the 9th jury member: JC 93%, Rob 7%.)		JC
