= Kano: An American and His Harem =

- Film poster
- Directed by: Monster Jimenez
- Written by: Monster Jimenez
- Produced by: Monster Jimenez
- Cinematography: Ike Avellana, Corinne de San Jose, Jay Abello
- Edited by: Mario Cornejo, Monster Jimenez, Lawrence Ang
- Release date: November 20, 2010 (IDFA)
- Running time: 80 minutes
- Country: Philippines

Kano: An American and His Harem is a 2010 Philippine independent documentary film written and directed by Monster Jimenez. The film premiered at the 2010 International Documentary Festival Amsterdam, where it won Best First Appearance. It won the best Documentary Award at the 2010 Cinemanila International Film Festival and the 2011 Gawad Urian Awards.

The documentary tells the story of an American Vietnam War veteran who relocates to the Philippines and invites hundreds of women to live with him in a poor, remote village. In 2001, he was charged with 80 counts of rape.

== See also ==
- Monster Jimenez
- Apocalypse Child
