= Marie Jamora =

Filipino director

Marietta Concepcion Jacinto Jamora is a Filipino music video director and commercial director who is known for her music videos, commercials, and feature film What Isn't There (Ang Nawawala).

== Career ==
Jamora has directed music videos for the bands and musicians Sandwich, Imago, Bamboo, Sponge Cola, Urbandub, Gary Valenciano, Itchyworms, and the Eraserheads.

As a director, her short films have been in competition and exhibition in the Cinemanila International Film Festival, Singapore's Women in Film Festival, the Loyola Film Circle's Ateneo Video Open, and the University of the Philippines Cineastes INDEO Short Film Festival. As a producer, Ming Kai Leung's short film, "Three Boys", has made the rounds at the Clermont-Ferrand International Short Film Festival, São Paulo International Short Film Festival, Jecheon International Music & Film Festival, Austin Film Festival, Cinemanila International Film Festival, winning the Gold Award at the 2009 Hong Kong Independent Film and Video Awards.

In 2008, she directed, produced, edited video and music of the first season of Project Runway Philippines, working with FremantleMedia.

In 2012, Marie was part of Cinemalaya Philippine Independent Film Festival, competing in the New Breed Category with her film Ang Nawawala. It took home two awards: Best Original Musical Score for composers Mikey Amistoso, Diego Mapa, and Jazz Nicolas; and Audience Choice award (New Breed), which is determined by votes from the Cinemalaya audience.

Since 2006, Marie has taught the class “Digital Video Filmmaking” in the Department of Communication at the Ateneo de Manila University, where she previously graduated cum laude in 2001.

Marie Jamora is not only a filmmaker, but is also a musician. She is the drummer for indie bands Blast Ople and Dexter Calliope and the Tito Gil Twins in 1998. Her current band, Boldstar, was named the Best New Artist at the 2002 NU 107 Rock Awards.

In 2013, Marie became one of the managing partners at Arsenal Manila, a camera rental and DIT service company for film and commercial projects in Manila and Southeast Asia. Marie moved to Los Angeles. She is developing her next two feature films while also doing editing work. She co-edited the Showtime Earthquake comedy special, These Ain’t Jokes, and the documentary The Death of "Superman Lives": What Happened?.

== Ang Nawawala ==
Ang Nawawala (What Isn't There in English) is Marie Jamora's 2012 feature film. A draft of Ang Nawawala was written in college at the Ateneo De Manila University, in a scriptwriting class under Uro dela Cruz. Another draft was written in film school under the scriptwriting class of Brendan Ward. Jamora worked on the script for about five years until around New Year's Eve 2011, when she asked Ramon de Veyra to co-write it with her. Prior to asking him to co-write the film, Marie approached Brainchild Studios to produce Ang Nawawala with her, with Bernard Dacanay and Trinka Lat joining her as the producers of the film. Jamora and de Veyra wrote the script for around six months and got an NCCA grant for their script. They made the film for the Cinemalaya Philippine Independent Film Festival.

== Personal life ==
Jamora graduated high school from Immaculate Conception University, cum laude from Ateneo de Manila University with a degree in Communication Arts, and a Masters in Film from Columbia University in 2005.

When Jamora was around her junior year in high school, her father had a Sony V8 camera, and as a child, she would record random things around her house with her father's camera. While attending high school at the Immaculate Conception Academy, she started making videos for her school projects. By the time it came to her senior year in high school, Jamora knew she wanted to pursue film. Earlier in her life, she thought she would be an actor but attending the Repertory Philippines theater workshop when she was in high school made her realize she did not want to pursue acting.

At Columbia University, she had Tom Kalin, Eric Mendelsohn, Lenore DeKoven, Philip Seymour Hoffman, and Nick Proferes as teachers. Kalin was her directing teacher, DeKoven taught Marie acting, and Hoffman taught directing the actor.

== Awards ==
She has directed over 40 music videos, garnering 8 wins and over 30 nominations from every Filipino music award institution, including MTV Pilipinas Music Awards, the NU 107 Rock Awards, and the MYX Music Awards.

Year	Award	Category	Nominated work	Results
2006	MTV Pilipinas Music Awards	Best Director	"Sugod" by Sandwich	Won

== Filmography ==
=== Feature films ===
- 2015 – The Death of "Superman Lives": What Happened? – Editor/post-production Supervisor
- 2012 – What Isn't There (Ang Nawawala) – Director, producer, co-writer, co-editor, co-music editor

=== Short films ===
- 2020 – Harana – Director
- 2016 – Flip the Record – Director, writer, producer, editor, music supervisor, colorist
- 2015 – Cream Silk Portraits - Director, story editor, co-editor
- 2015 – Isobel - Director, writer, editor, color correction, sound recordist
- 2015 – 20 Years of Anarchy in Cinema - Co-director, editor, color correction, sound recordist
- 2014 – What Isn't Said - Director, co-writer, co-editor, co-music supervisor
- 2013 – Closer - Director, asst. editor, sound design, color correction
- 2011 – Itchyworms 15th Anniversary Tour - Director, editor, sound design, color correction
- 2010 – New York Is My Boyfriend - Director, writer, editor, sound design
- 2007 – Three Boys - Producer
- 2006 – Lock - Director of photography
- 2006 – Dexter Calliope & The Adarna Bird 2006 - Director, co-writer, co-editor
- 2003 – Quezon City - Director, co-writer, editor, sound design
- 2003 – Dirty Laundry - Director, writer, editor, sound design
- 2002 – Divergence - Director, writer, editor, music editor, color correction
- 2002 – Kaarawan (Birthday) - Director, co-writer
- 1999 – Pata ‘Yan/Patayan (A Pound of Flesh/The Killing) - Director, co-writer
