= Annicka Dolonius =

Filipina character actress

- Occupation: Actress
- Years active: 2007–present

Annicka Dolonius is a Filipina character actress best known for her award-winning performances in Philippine New Wave films such as Pisay (2007), Ang Nawawala (2012) and Apocalypse Child (2015). She has also appeared in various commercial film and television roles.

== See also ==
- Ang Nawawala
- Apocalypse Child
- Monster Jimenez
