= Project Runway Philippines season 2 =

Project Runway Philippines
- Season 2
- Host Teresa Herrera with the profiles of the second season's 13 designers as pinheads on a pincushion
- No. of tasks: 12
- No. of contestants: 13
- Winner: Manny Marquez
- No. of episodes: 15

Release
- Original network: ETC
- Original release: August 12 – December 2, 2009

Additional information
- Filming dates: early 2009

Season chronology
- ← Previous; Season 1 Next → Season 3

The second season of Project Runway Philippines premiered on August 12, 2009, on cable network ETC and UHF station Southern Broadcasting Network. Model and actress Teresa Herrera returns as the program's host, while fashion designers Jojie Lloren and Rajo Laurel renew their mentorship and judging duties respectively, with top model and fashion columnist Apples Aberin completing the judging panel.

Thirteen (13) designers from all over the Philippines compete in weekly fashion design challenges to earn a spot in Philippine Fashion Week. The winner of this season will receive P500,000 (around US$10,400), an editorial spread in Preview magazine, a start-up business package, and a summer scholarship from Istituto Marangoni, which is the European partner of School of Fashion and the Arts.

== Auditions ==
The second season auditions were held during the time period between December 2008 and March 2009. Auditions for designers based in Metro Manila and Luzon Island were conducted in SM City North EDSA and SM Megamall, while casting call for designers in Visayas and Mindanao island groups were done in SM City Cebu and SM City Davao respectively. A final round of auditions was also held at Solar Century Tower in Makati.

== Contestants ==
The 13 designers competing in the second season of Project Runway Philippines consists of established designers and new designers who used to have jobs unrelated to fashion such as a nurse, a call center agent, and an accountant. They were introduced at a launch party held at Embassy Superclub in Taguig City. Note that the ages listed are the designers' ages at the time the show was taped in early 2009.

- Manny Marquez, 37 years old from San Pedro, Laguna. A former scholar of top fashion designer Ben Ferrales, who left his pregnant wife to join the competition.
- Russell Villafuerte, 25 years old from San Jose, Antique. An Interior Design graduate from University of the Philippines who works as a graphic designer. Eliminated - December 2, 2009
- Santi Obcena, 25 years old from Quezon City, Metro Manila. A former dancer who studied at the Philippine High School for the Arts. Participated in Philippine Fashion Week 2009.Eliminated - December 2, 2009
- Cherry Veric, 27 years old from Ibajay, Aklan. A formal wear designer who used to work in Saudi Arabia and China.Eliminated - October 28, 2009
- Patrick Galang, 25 years old from San Pedro, Laguna. A former call center agent. Participated in Philippine Fashion Week in 2008. He was cited by Mega magazine as one of "8 Designers You Should Know" and by Preview magazine as one of "11 Best New Designers." Eliminated - September 9, 2009, and again on October 21, 2009
- Hanz Coquilla, 27 years old from Talisay City, Cebu. Dropped out of school, with a major in medical technology, to pursue a career as a fashion designer, which he has been doing for nine years. Eliminated - October 14, 2009
- Meanne Santos, 21 years old from Bacoor, Cavite. This season's youngest designer, she landed a design job right after graduating from college. She won a student design competition at De La Salle-College of Saint Benilde in 2007. Eliminated - October 7, 2009
- Richie Bondoc, 29 years old from Mexico, Pampanga. A graduate of Angeles University Foundation, he is a dressmaker's son who inherited his mother's business after she died of cancer. Eliminated - October 7, 2009
- Randy Leaño, 32 years old from Laoag City, Ilocos Norte. A Physical Education teacher from Mariano Marcos State University who began making clothes for his students' school plays. Eliminated - September 16, 2009
- Jas Cristobal, 35 years old from Valenzuela City, Metro Manila. A former accountant who designs and sews her own work wardrobe, then eventually creates clothes for her colleagues. Eventually crossed-over into creating hand-painted handbags and shoes. Eliminated - September 2, 2009
- Tracy Dizon, 26 years old from Quezon City, Metro Manila. A single mother and fashion stylist for television and merchandising. She was head stylist and costume designer for ABS-CBN's Lastikman. She is also one of three designers, along with season one second runner-up Veejay Floresca, who will represent the Philippines in the 47th Japan Fashion Design Competition. Eliminated - August 26, 2009
- Pau Geronimo, 23 years old from Pasay. A multi-genre designer who majored in Clothing Technology at University of the Philippines. Eliminated - August 19, 2009
- Hazel Sta. Ana, 23 years old from Pasig. A registered nurse who decided to pursue fashion design. Eliminated - August 12, 2009

== List of episodes ==
No. overall	No. in season	Title	Guest Judge(s)	Original release date
16	1	"Self-Deconstruction"	Vic Barba, noted fashion designer	August 12, 2009
After settling in their rooms in Makati's Amorsolo Mansions, the designers were invited by Teresa and Jojie for a welcome toast located at one of the city's rooftop swimming pools. Prior to arriving at the party venue, the designers were asked to bring a bag of extra clothes. Their first challenge was then revealed to the designers upon arrival: to create a dress by deconstructing the clothes off their backs, as well as choosing another roll of colored fabric located at the other end of the pool as added material. The designers were given exactly five minutes to take off their clothes and race to the end of the pool to pull their selected fabric swatches. Their creation should illustrate their design philosophy. The winner of the challenge was given immunity for the next round.
17	2	"Movie Challenge"	James Reyes, noted fashion designer	August 19, 2009
The 12 designers were divided into four teams of three members each. After asking each designer of their favorite movie, Jojie randomly selected Hanz, Santi, Jas, and Cherry as team leaders, who then chose their respective teammates. Each team would then create a three-piece collection inspired by a movie that they have chosen. The teams were given a budget of P6,000 (about US$124) each and were brought to Carolina's Lace Shoppe in Glorietta 1, Makati, to purchase their materials. The winner of this challenge would be granted immunity for the next challenge.
18	3	"Bridal Wear Challenge"	Isabel Roces, Filipina top model and vice president of Professional Models Association of the Philippines; Patrice Ramos-Diaz, noted bridal designer	August 26, 2009
The designers were visited by Filipina top model Isabel Roces, who told them about their next challenge: To create a wedding dress for her upcoming destination wedding. The only catch is that they are not allowed to use white.
19	4	"Designer Makeover"	Tim Yap, party promoter and "style guru"	September 2, 2009
Each of the ten designers was tasked to create a makeover design to their client: a fellow designer. They were given P2,000 (about US$41) and one day to complete the new look.
20	5	"Resort Loungewear Challenge"	Hindy Weber-Tantoco, fashion designer for Culte Femme and curator for Rustan's Commercial Corporation	September 9, 2009
The designers were introduced to fashion designer Hindy Weber-Tantoco who introduced them to their newest challenge: Create a luxurious resort wear out of what she described as "the crummiest of materials." The designers then proceeded to the work room where they discovered nine sacks containing the following materials: Banig (a woven mat made of palm leaves), white t-shirts, flannel, rags made of scrap fabric, muslin, and terrycloth towels. They were also given P1,000 (around US$20) to buy additional materials and one day to complete the design.
21	6	"Futuristic Couture"	Pauline Suaco-Juan, editor-in-chief of Preview magazine; Melissa Dizon, designer of Eairth	September 16, 2009
Lloren introduced the designers to Pauline Suaco-Juan, editor-in-chief of Preview magazine, who told them about their next challenge: Making a dress with a futuristic design based on the magazine's trend forecast using natural fabrics. They were given P5,000 and one day to finish their creations. An update on the Pond's Challenge was also shown. The two teams were given two yards of red silk chiffon fabric and were given several minutes to discuss about their designs. With Galang eliminated in the previous episode, Veric voluntarily took over the leadership role on his team, using his own sketch as the basis for their design.
22	7	"Avant Garde and Architectural"	Jojie Lloren, mentor of Project Runway Philippines, who incidentally is an avant-garde designer and grand prize winner of Concours International des Jeunes Créateurs de Mode (an international student fashion design competition held in Paris) in 1998	September 23, 2009
The designers were brought on a field trip to a modernly-designed house located in Calatagan, Batangas. Herrera greeted them by the doorway and paired the designers in teams of two members, starting with the top three designers from the previous episode picking their respective partners leaving Villafuerte the odd man out. The host then introduced him to his partner: Patrick Galang, who was eliminated in Episode 5. Herrera informed the designers of their challenge: To create an avant-garde dress inspired from the house. The designers then met Carlos Calma, the architect behind the abode, who took them on a tour inside the establishment. The house was highlighted by the use of glass panels instead of walls, rhythmic structures, and Cobonpue furniture. The designers then proceeded to Metro Gaisano department store in Market! Market! to purchase materials for their creations using a P5,000 budget.
23	8	"Taming Tessa"	Tessa Prieto-Valdes	October 7, 2009
The designers were introduced to Tessa Prieto-Valdes, a Philippine fashion icon known for her over-the-top, eccentric, and colorful style. The designers were tasked to tone down or tame Tessa Prieto-Valdes's outrageous style by creating a ready-to-wear (RTW) ensemble with a budget of only P800. While the brief was to tone down the exaggerated point of view of how Tessa dresses, the designers were also tasked that their creations still echo a touch of Tessa's quirky personality and also that their garments look expensive despite their limited budget. They were also taken to the showroom of Michelis where they selected accessories for their designs. Mentor Jojie Lloren instructed them to use all the accessories they chose. This episode features a double elimination since the previous episode retained all the designers.
24	9	"Rockstar Menswear"	Joey Samson, Bryanboy	October 14, 2009
Teresa met with the designers on the runway and hinted that fashion and music go "hand in hand". She then asked the contestants to randomly select music CDs from a bag. Having selected their respective discs, Teresa then revealed the rest of the details of the challenge: they are to be paired with members of top rock bands in the Philippines based on the albums they picked, and were tasked to design a rock star ensemble for them.
25	10	"The L'Oréal Anniversary Challenge"	TBA	October 21, 2009
The remaining designers were given party invites from host Teresa Herrera, only to be told they would only be opened when they will be in the SoFA workroom with mentor Jojie Lloren. Upon arrival, Jojie introduced to the designers one of the chief makeup artists for L'Oreal Paris, Jigs Mayuga, who revealed the details of the challenge: they hold invitations to the centennial anniversary of the L'Oreal brand, and their brief was to create an evening gown that a Philippine guest will wear to the centenary L'Oreal event in Paris, France. They were given pegs of L'Oreal advertisements from past to present as inspiration for their design, along with the instruction to use the colors gold, black, champagne, or white as the main color palette for their designs.
26	11	"Channeling Cobonpue"	Kenneth Cobonpue and fashion designer, Ivarluski Aseron	October 28, 2009
The final four designers face their last challenge to determine which three will compete in Philippine Fashion Week. Teresa met with the designers and informed them that they will be taking a trip and presented them with airline tickets, which revealed that the designers will be flying off to Cebu City along with mentor Jojie Lloren. Upon arrival in Cebu, the Project Runway Philippine contingent had a lunch at Aziza, an upscale fine dining restaurant, where the designers had a surprise guest: internationally renowned interior designer, Kenneth Cobonpue, whose critically acclaimed furniture pieces garnered worldwide press attention. They were then taken to Z Bar, the upper level of Aziza, where the bar's interior was personally designed by Cobonpue in his signature style of using natural materials subjected in a modernistic approach. Afterwards, the designers were taken to the Kenneth Cobonpue showroom where they were able to see the world-famous furniture designs up close, including the Dragnet, Yoda, and Lolah chairs, as well as the Voyage bed, which was reported to be bought by Brad Pitt and Angelina Jolie. At the end of the tour, their final challenge was presented: to create an outfit of their choosing with Cobonpue furniture as their main inspiration. An additional brief was to incorporate Cobonpue's preferred materials to create his furnishings such as rattan and abaca as one of the main components in their garments. They were taken to Ayala Center Cebu to purchase fabric for their garments, after which they all flew back to Manila to complete their task.
27	12	"The Reunion"	TBA	November 4, 2009
28	13	"Looking Back"	TBA	November 9, 2009
29	14	"The Final Runway"	N/A	November 25, 2009
30	15	"The Final Runway"	Inno Sotto and Marco Muggianu	December 2, 2009

== Episode details ==
=== Episode 1 - Self-Deconstruction ===
Designer	Material(s) used
Cherry	Black t-shirt
Hanz	Beaded jeans
Hazel	Dress
Jas	Jeans
Manny	Jacket, shorts
Meanne	Knitted dress
Patrick	Jacket, shirt
Pau	Polo, denim jeans
Randy	Denim jeans
Richie	White jeans, polo shirt
Russell	Black shirt, jeans
Santi	Polo, jeans
Tracy	Jeans

- Winner: Patrick Galang
- Eliminated: Hazel Sta. Ana

=== Episode 2 - Movie Challenge ===
Team leader	Team members	Movie used for inspiration
Hanz	Manny and Randy	Titanic
Santi	Meanne and Richie	Dreamgirls
Jas	Patrick and Russell	The Lord of the Rings
Cherry	Pau and Tracy	Chicago

- Winner: Jas Cristobal
- Eliminated: Pau Geronimo

=== Episode 3 - Bridal Wear Challenge ===
- Winner: Hanz Coquilla
- Eliminated: Tracy Dizon

=== Episode 4 - Designer Makeover ===
Designer	Client
Hanz	Santi
Santi	Meanne
Meanne	Patrick
Patrick	Manny
Manny	Richie
Richie	Randy
Randy	Russel
Russel	Hanz
Cherry	Jas
Jas	Cherry

- Winner: Randy Leaño
- Eliminated: Jas Cristobal

=== Episode 5 - Resort Loungewear Challenge ===
Santi	Patrick
Manny	Cherry
Randy	Hanz
Meanne	Richie
Russell	

- Winner: Cherry Veric
- Eliminated: Patrick Galang

=== Episode 6 - Futuristic Couture ===
- Winner: Hanz Coquilla
- Eliminated: Randy Leaño

=== Episode 7 - Avant Garde and Architectural ===
Team leader	Partner
Hanz	Manny
Meanne	Cherry
Santi	Richie
Russel	Patrick

- Winner: Hanz Coquilla and Manny Marquez
- Eliminated: none (Note: The judges decided not to eliminate because they believed the designers presented impressive creations for this challenge.)

=== Episode 8 - Taming Tessa ===
- Winner: Russell Villafuerte
- Eliminated: Richie Bondoc, Meanne Santos

=== Episode 9 – Rockstar Menswear ===
- Winner: Manny Marquez
- Eliminated: Hanz Coquilla

=== Episode 10 – The L'Oréal Anniversary Challenge ===
- Winner: Cherry Veric
- Eliminated: Patrick Galang

=== Episode 11 – Channeling Cobonpue ===
Designer	Cobonpue furniture inspiration
Russell	red Dragnet chair
Santi	black Yoda chair
Manny	three brown lamps - Halo, Molly, and Biba
Cherry	brown Noodle chair

- Winner: Russell Villafuerte
- Eliminated: Cherry Veric

=== Episode 15 - The Final Runway (Part 2) ===
- Guest Judges: Inno Sotto and Marco Muggianu
- Winner: Manny Marquez
- 2nd Place: Rusell Villafuerte
- 3rd Place: Santi Obcena

== Elimination charts ==
=== Designer competition ===
	1	2 ^{1}	3^{2}	4	5	6	7 ^{3}	8 ^{4}	9	10	11	15	Episode
Manny	IN	IN	IN	IN	HIGH	LOW	WIN	LOW	WIN	LOW	LOW	WINNER	The Final Runway (Part 2)
Russell	HIGH	HIGH	IN	IN	HIGH	LOW	LOW	WIN	LOW	HIGH	WIN	RUNNER-UP	The Final Runway (Part 2)
Santi	HIGH	LOW	IN	HIGH	IN	HIGH	HIGH	IN	HIGH	HIGH	HIGH	3RD PLACE	The Final Runway (Part 2)
Cherry	IN	LOW	HIGH	HIGH	WIN	IN	LOW	IN	HIGH	WIN	OUT		Channeling Cobonpue
Patrick	WIN	HIGH	IN	LOW	OUT		LOW	HIGH	LOW	OUT			The L'Oréal Anniversary Challenge
Hanz	IN	IN	WIN	IN	IN	WIN	WIN	LOW	OUT				Rockstar Menswear
Meanne	IN	LOW	LOW	IN	LOW	HIGH	LOW	OUT					Taming Tessa RTW
Richie	LOW	LOW	IN	HIGH	LOW	IN	HIGH	OUT					Taming Tessa RTW
Randy	IN	IN	HIGH	WIN	IN	OUT							Futuristic Couture
Jas	LOW	WIN	LOW	OUT									Designer Makeover
Tracy	IN	LOW	OUT										Bridal Wear Challenge
Pau	IN	OUT											Movie Challenge
Hazel	OUT												Self-Deconstruction

- ^Note 1: Episode 2 is a team challenge. Cherry, Hanz, Jas, and Santi were selected as team leaders. Only Jas' team got the highest score while Santi's team and Cherry's team got the lowest scores eliminating Pau for having the worst design overall in the challenge.
- ^Note 2: In Episode 3 Jas have the worst design. Because Jas have immunity for winning the Episode 2 challenge, she was spared causing Tracy's elimination.
- ^Note 3: Episode 7 is a team challenge. Hanz, Meanne, Santi, and Russel were selected as team leaders. Since the challenge is about making a design collaboration, Hanz and Manny were both declared winners for this challenge. Patrick was brought back in the competition and was paired with Russell. Even though Cherry and Meanne's team have the worst design they were both spared for elimination.
- ^Note 4: Since there were no elimination in Episode 7, the two designers with the lowest scores were eliminated in Episode 8.

Green background and WINNER means the designer won Project Runway Philippines.
Blue background and WIN means the designer won that challenge.
Blue background and HIGH means the designer's score was tied with the winning designer, but did not win the challenge.
Turquoise background and HIGH means the designer had one of the highest scores for that challenge, and came in second.
Light blue background and HIGH means the designer had one of the highest scores for that challenge, but did not place in the top two.
Pink background and LOW means the designer had one of the lowest scores for that challenge, but was not eliminated.
Orange background and LOW means the designer was in the bottom two, but was not eliminated.
Violet background and LOW means the designer have the worst design but because of immunity the designer was spared for elimination.
Red background and OUT means the designer lost and was out of the competition.

=== Fashion model competition ===
Model	1	2	3	4	5	6	7	8	9	10	11	14	15
Julie Ann	WIN	IN	IN	IN	IN	IN	IN	WIN	IN	IN	IN	IN	WINNER
Sinoia	IN	IN	OUT				IN	IN	IN	IN	WIN	IN	OUT
Reynalyn	IN	IN	IN	IN	IN	IN	IN	IN	IN	IN	IN	IN	OUT
Shyrmaine	IN	IN	IN	IN	WIN	IN	IN	IN	IN	WIN	IN	OUT	
Russel	IN	IN	IN	IN	IN	IN	IN	IN	IN	IN	OUT		
Cheeney	IN	WIN	WIN	IN	IN	WIN	WIN	IN	IN	OUT			
Cheska	IN	IN	IN	IN	IN	IN	IN	IN	IN	OUT			
Zeke	IN	IN	IN	IN	IN	IN	IN	IN	WIN	OUT			
Fianca	IN	IN	IN	IN	IN	IN	OUT						
Kristine	IN	IN	IN	IN	IN	OUT							
Mariella	IN	IN	IN	WIN	OUT								
Aika	IN	IN	IN	OUT									
Nikita	IN	OUT											

Green background and WINNER means the model was paired with the winning designer, and won the competition.
Blue background and WIN means the model wore the winning design.
Teal background and WIN means the model was paired with the winning designer, but did not participate in the runway show.
Light blue background and IN means the model did not participate in the runway show.
Pink background and IN means the model wore the losing design.
Violet background and IN means the model was paired with the losing designer, but did not participate in the runway show.
Red background and OUT means the model was eliminated.
