= Project Runway Philippines season 1 =

Project Runway Philippines
- Season 1
- Judges Rajo Laurel and Apples Aberin-Sahdwani, host Teresa Herrera, and mentor Jojie Lloren, together with the designers of Project Runway Philippines season 1
- No. of tasks: 12
- No. of contestants: 14
- Winner: Aries Lagat
- No. of episodes: 13 + 2

Release
- Original network: ETC
- Original release: July 30 – November 12, 2008

Additional information
- Filming dates: early 2008

Season chronology
- Next → Season 2

The first season of Project Runway Philippines premiered on July 30, 2008 on cable through ETC Entertainment Central and on free TV through SBN 21. The show was hosted by model and actress Teresa Herrera, with fashion designer and faculty member of School of Fashion and the Arts Jojie Lloren serving as mentor and Marie Jamora as director. Filipino top model and lifestyle feature writer Apples Aberin-Sahdwani and fashion designer Rajo Laurel complete the judging panel.

The winner received P500,000 (roughly US$11,000) in cash, a start-up business package, an editorial spread in Mega magazine, and an opportunity to show their collection in Philippine Fashion Week. The final three designers, as revealed in the Finale episode, would get to design a clothing line to be sold exclusively in SM Makati and SM Ortigas, while the winner would display his collection in SM Makati.

The final runway show was held on October 23, 2008, at the SMX Convention Center in Pasay, with New York-based handbag and accessories designer Rafé Totengco and notable shoe designer Cesar Gaupo as guest judges. Aries Lagat of Iligan City was declared the winner, with Philipp Tampus of Lapu-Lapu City and Veejay Floresca of Makati as runners-up.

== Auditions ==
Project Runway Philippines held its auditions from January 14 through January 16, 2008 in School of Fashion and the Arts (SoFA) in Makati, Metro Manila. Casting call was also held on March 10, 2008 in Crown Regency Hotel and Towers in Cebu City for fashion designers in Visayas and Mindanao island groups. Over 200 designers auditioned during the course of the casting calls.

== Contestants ==
The 14 finalists of Project Runway Philippines, which consists of a mix of established and new designers, were introduced in a press conference held in Greenbelt 5 Gallery in Makati. Note that the ages listed are the designers' ages at the time the show was taped in early 2008.

- Aries Lagat - 25 years old from Iligan City, Lanao del Norte. He won the 2006 Mega Young Designers Competition (Mega YDC), an annual competition for Filipino novice fashion designers sponsored by Mega magazine. He is also a former scholar of top designer Ben Ferrales, and teaches in Fashion Institute of the Philippines. - Winner, November 12, 2008
- Philipp Tampus - 36 years old from Lapu-Lapu City, Cebu. A bridal and evening gown designer based in Saudi Arabia and United Arab Emirates with 14 years of experience. Competed in 1994 Mega YDC, where it was revealed in Episode 10 that he competed with Laurel. - Eliminated, November 12, 2008
- Veejay Floresca - 23 years old from Makati, Metro Manila. He studied fashion design and merchandising in De La Salle-College of Saint Benilde. He competed in the International Competition of Young Fashion Designers (ICYFD) in Paris, and was described by a fashion magazine as "The Next Face of Avant Garde." - Eliminated, November 12, 2008
- Mara Reyes - 21 years old from Pasig, Metro Manila. She graduated with a Bachelor's Degree in Fine Arts Major in Painting from the University of the Philippines Diliman, she works as a costume designer. - Eliminated, October 8, 2008
- Jaz Cerezo - 25 years old from Dagupan. An Advertising graduate of Far Eastern University, she studied in Slim's Fashion and Arts School to pursue a career in fashion. She designs wedding dresses and evening gowns. - Eliminated, October 1, 2008
- Eli Gonzales - 26 years old from San Pedro, Laguna. A graduate of Industrial Design, he was a fashion design professor at De La Salle-College of Saint Benilde in Manila. - Eliminated, September 24, 2008
- Ava Paguyo - 27 years old from San Carlos City, Pangasinan. A textile designer who graduated with Biology and Clothing Technology majors from University of the Philippines Diliman. - Eliminated, September 17, 2008
- Ivan Raborar - 23 years old from Koronadal City, South Cotabato. He is a two-time winner of the T'nalak Haute Couture Grand Prize. - Eliminated, September 17, 2008
- Bo Parcon - 37 years old from Iloilo City. Dubbed as "Iloilo's Bad Boy of Fashion," he is one of the winners in a terno design competition sponsored by Metropolitan Museum. - Eliminated, September 3, 2008
- Winnie Chua - 24 years old from Malate District, Manila. She is a fashion merchandiser and ready-to-wear designer. She took up Fashion Design and Merchandising at De La Salle-College of Saint Benilde. - Eliminated, August 27, 2008
- Charette Regala - 36 years old from Quezon City, Metro Manila. A former clothing technology instructor at the University of the Philippines Diliman and former product manager and head of sourcing for a sporting apparel brand. - Eliminated, August 20, 2008
- Lord Maturan - 24 years old from Talisay City, Cebu. Winner of 2007 Cebu Young Designers' Council. - Eliminated, August 13, 2008
- Lorymer Villareal - 21 years old from Cebu City. An aeronautical student and a self-taught designer. He joined the 2005 Philippine Fashion Competition and became one of the country's representatives in ICYFD in Paris that same year. - Eliminated, August 6, 2008
- Loida Hunter - 51 years old from San Pedro, Laguna. A dressmaker who specializes in corporate uniforms. - Eliminated, July 30, 2008

== Episodes ==
No. overall	No. in season	Title	Original release date
1	1	"Individuality as a Designer"	July 30, 2008
The 14 designers gathered in Manila's Liwasang Bonifacio and were greeted by host Teresa Herrera and their mentor Jojie Lloren. After an introductory round of coconut water straight out of coconuts, the designers were tasked to collect as much fabrics and accessories, which were draped on parked jeepneys, as possible. They were then told that they are required to use all of the materials they have gathered in creating a dress that shows their personality as a designer. The winner was granted immunity for the next challenge.: Guest Judge: Frederick Peralta, top Filipino fashion designer; Winner: Aries Lagat; Eliminated: Loida Hunter
2	2	"13 Legends"	August 6, 2008
The remaining designers were tasked to create a dress inspired from their assigned legendary Filipino fashion designers. To have an idea on the styles of these "13 Legends," the designers had consultations with students from the School of Fashion and the Arts (SoFA). They were given P2,000 (roughly US$46) for materials from Metro Gaisano Mall in Taguig City, Metro Manila, and two days to sew their creations. The winner was granted immunity for the next challenge.
3	3	"Hip Hop Meets Couture"	August 13, 2008
Lloren introduced the remaining designers to Carla Sibal (editor in chief of Mega magazine) and Sarah Meier (model and former VJ of MTV Southeast Asia). The competitors were tasked to create a design that fuses hip hop and haute couture sensibilities. Meier chose six design sketches for the runway show, while the designers of which chose their respective team partners. The winning design will be worn by Meier in a fashion editorial for Mega magazine, while the designer was granted immunity for the next challenge.
4	4	"Nesvita Design Challenge"	August 20, 2008
The remaining designers were brought to TRIbeca Private Residence, a resort in Muntinlupa, for a whole day of rest. What they did not know is that the next challenge would take place there. They were tasked by a representative of Nestlé Philippines to create a resort wear that can easily be transformed as a day dress and an evening wear using the color palette of Nesvita Cereal Milk Drink (mainly lime green, with yellow and pink). The designers had to gather their materials in cabanas situated in the resort within the time limit of five minutes. The winning designer was granted immunity for the next challenge, and the winning design was worn by Karla Paula Henry, Miss Earth 2008.
5	5	"Open Your Eyes"	August 27, 2008
The ten designers were brought to Cubao Expo, a section in Araneta Center in Quezon City's Cubao district formerly lined with shoe stores and now housed with art galleries and vintage stores. They were given digital cameras and tasked to take photos within the area for 2½ hours. They then select one image which serves as an inspiration for their next design. The winner received a Canon Ixus digital camera, but was not given immunity for the next challenge.
6	6	"Wedding Challenge"	September 3, 2008
The remaining designers were introduced to their models who were wearing wedding dresses picked out of thrift stores. The challenge was to create a bridal dress using at least 50 percent of the inexpensive gowns they have chosen. They were also given P3,000 (roughly US$65) and 20 minutes to shop for additional materials, as well as two days to complete their design. The winner received immunity for the next challenge.
7	7	"Beverly Hills 6750 Design Challenge"	September 10, 2008
The eight designers were brought to Beverly Hills 6750, a high-end aesthetic center in Makati, and were given its signature facial treatment worth P14,000 (roughly US$300). It was here where Lloren and a representative of the center gave the designers their task for this episode. The challenge was to create an office uniform that would represent Beverly Hills 6750 as a classy and sophisticated establishment. All of the designers were given equal amounts of material—four yards of black fabric and three yards of white cloth—and one day to complete their design. The winner received free services from the sponsor client, but no immunity was granted for this challenge.
8	8	"Pond's Design Challenge"	September 17, 2008
The designers were treated on a buffet breakfast on their apartment lobby, wherein Lloren informed them that two designers would be eliminated in this challenge. He then introduced a representative from Pond's, who gave the designers their next challenge: to create an outfit for young wives for a romantic night out with their husbands, with red incorporated into the design. She also introduced a group of young wives who would serve as the designers' clients and models. The winner of this challenge from hereon would not receive immunity.
9	9	"Cinderella Ready-To-Wear Challenge"	September 24, 2008
The remaining six designers were brought to a branch of Cinderella, a department store that recently celebrated its 60th anniversary. Lloren and a representative of the store gave the task to the designers, which was to create a collection of three ready-to-wear outfits that represent a woman of Cinderella. The designers formed two teams, with Gonzales and Cerezo being the leaders. The materials were to be gathered from clothes inside the store, which would then be deconstructed to create new designs. Each team received a budget of P6,000 (roughly US$131) and were given 17 hours to finish the collection. The winning collection would be displayed in a Cinderella display window for one month, while the models who wore the winning designs would receive gift certificates from the store.
10	10	"Push Tradition Forward"	October 1, 2008
The designers were brought to Laurel's fashion house, where he introduced them to his mother as well as to the commercial side of fashion. Once they got back to SoFA, they were then introduced to Department of Agriculture Secretary Arthur Yap who told them about their next challenge. They were tasked to create an avant-garde outfit made from Philippine indigenous fabrics made from pineapple and abacá fibers as well as silk, which are usually made for traditional costumes such as barong Tagalog and baro't saya. Each designer chose a bundle of assorted natural fabrics as their materials, with Floresca choosing first being the previous winner. They were given 28 hours to finish their designs.
11	11	"Terno Challenge"	October 8, 2008
The four remaining designers were brought on a "Livin' La Vida Imelda" architectural tour with Carlos Celdran, a celebrity tour guide. Before the beginning of the tour, Celdran told the designers about their next challenge: to create a "terno," a variation of the baro't saya with butterfly sleeves popularized by Former First Lady Imelda Marcos, and who continues to wear the terno. The Project Runway design was to take the dress to the 21st Century. Celdran then reintroduced the designers to the Cultural Center of the Philippines Complex, which houses the Cultural Center of the Philippines, Philippine International Convention Center, Folk Arts Theater, and Manila Film Center. All of these establishments were built during the 1970s, a decade ruled under Martial law by Former President Ferdinand Marcos but was also a period of renaissance for Philippine arts and culture headed by its Former First Lady Marcos. The designers were then given P5,000 (roughly US$105) and 30 minutes to shop for materials in Metro Gaisano. After sketching their designs and shopping for materials, the designers were then brought to the residence of Imelda Marcos, who narrated about the evolution of the terno from a heavy four-piece ensemble inspired during the country's Spanish colonization period to a simple one-piece dress highlighted with a pair of butterfly sleeves, adapting to the aesthetics of Filipinos during the Post-War period. The designers pitched their sketches to Marcos, who was pleased by their designs. The designers were given a total of three days to complete their outfit, with Reyes getting an extra hour of work as the winner of the previous episode's challenge.
14	12	"Finale"	November 5, 2008
15	13	"Finale"	November 12, 2008
Part 1: After Tampus (as winner of the last challenge) chose his model for the Finale, Herrera briefed the remaining three designers that they were going to create a 12-piece collection for Philippine Fashion Week. Lloren visited the designers in their hometowns two weeks before Fashion Week and consulted about their collections. He first visited Floresca in Makati, who narrated about his mother's past struggles as a widow who single-handedly raised her family. Floresca said that his collection was not based on any inspiration. Lloren then went to neighboring Parañaque to visit Lagat, who was not able to work with his collection in his hometown of Iligan City due to the ongoing war between government forces and Moro Islamic Liberation Front and instead was staying in a friend's house. Lagat brought Lloren to the house of Ben Farrales, a well-known designer who gave Lagat a scholarship in fashion design. Lagat stated that his collection was based on the animated series Ben 10. Lloren then went to Lapu-Lapu City to visit Tampus in his family home. Tampus introduced his mentor to his whole family as well as his friends who served as his viewing buddies during the show's broadcast. He stated that his collection was a dedication to his late mother. The final three designers, with their collections in tow, went back to SoFA two days before Fashion Week. Lloren greeted the designers and gave his inputs about the progress of their creations. They also got to choose their models, wherein Floresca got the ire of Lagat after he chose a model that Lagat intends to pick. Lloren also announced the order of the Final Runway: Tampus presents his collection first, followed by Floresca and Lagat. After a night's rest in their new apartments (with Tampus getting the "best room" in the suite as winner of the previous challenge), the finalists were brought to SM City Marikina and met Herrera together with Tonichi Nocom, an in-house designer for SM, who introduced them to their final challenge: to create a men's wear as their 13th outfit. Herrera also introduced the designers to a group of male models for them to choose. She then reminded the three about the Reunion Special wherein they were asked whom among the eliminated designers they would want to work with, and it turned out that they would become the assistant designers for the finalists. The finalists were given P3,000 (roughly US$62) to create their additional garment. Part 2: The finalists, along with their assistant designers, proceeded to The Fabric Warehouse in Quezon City to purchase materials for their 13th outfit. They then went to SoFA and began creating their garments, which was filled with candid conversations and singing. Their models visited the workroom for fitting. After finishing their men's wear, the finalists continued adding finishing touches to their collections. A day later, the finalists were brought to SMX Convention Center for the Final Runway presentation. The chaos of backstage was shown from putting make-up on the models to readjusting the garments to fit the models. Lloren was also backstage for moral support, as well as helping out with removing lint on some of the garments. Herrera welcomed the audience for the Final Runway and introduced the guest judges. Tampus presented his collection first, which featured crocheted garments from resort wear to evening dresses. Floresca's collection was next, which consisted of monochromatic dresses using neutral tones. Lagat was last to present his collection, which was highlighted with a 1950s-inspired dress that was taken apart by two models and then converted into three separate dresses. After the show, the members of the audience and eliminated designers concluded that the competition was a toss-up between Tampus and Lagat. At the judging, Laurel baptized Tampus as "The Romantic Designer" as the judges praised his youthful use of crochet. Floresca, meanwhile, was christened by Laurel as "The Modernist" as the judges lauded the practicality of his designs considering the conservative fashion market in the Philippines. Lagat was then labeled as "The Technician" by Laurel and was complimented his complicated designs that did not appear busy. During the deliberations, the judges criticized some of Tampus' overworked garments, Floresca's fabric choices, and Lagat's final dress which they claimed as off from the rest of the garments. The designers were brought back to the studio for the announcement of winner. Floresca was eliminated first, leaving Tampus and Lagat in contention for the title. Herrera then called Lagat as the winner of Project Runway Philippines, who then fell on his knees and shed tears of joy. He kidded Tampus that his reaction was "embarrassing" and his knees were hurt because of it. The judges, along with Lagat's father, congratulated the winner. The show ended with Lagat talking to his mother, who is working overseas, through a cellular phone.

=== "13 Legends" ===
Designer	Fashion Legend	Style
Aries	Roy Gonzales	Redesigned barong tagalog using haute couture influences
Ava	Ben Farrales	Mixes Muslim and Grecian influences
Bo	Joe Salazar	Well-crafted gowns with fine and delicate embellishments
Charette	Inno Sotto	Modern pieces with classic elegance and impeccable finish
Eli	Christian Espiritu	Counted socialites Imelda Marcos and TingTing Cojuangco as his muses
Ivan	Cesar Gaupo	Ready-to-wear creations with clean lines and silhouettes
Jaz	Patis Tesoro	Modernized Filipino dresses
Lord	Ramon Valera	Modernized terno silhouette
Lorymer	Ernest Santiago	Adventurous designs with exaggerated shoulders and capes
Mara	Steve de Leon	Avant-garde origami designs using local fabrics
Philipp	Auggie Cordero	Audrey Hepburn-inspired classic and romantic pieces
Veejay	Pitoy Moreno	High-fashion Filipiniana gowns made with local materials
Winnie	Josie Natori	High-fashion pieces with a mixture of Filipino and Japanese influences

- Guest Judge: Amina Aranaz-Alunan, handbag designer and co-founder of SoFA
- Winner: Philipp Tampus
- Eliminated: Lorymer Villareal

=== "Hip Hop Meets Couture" ===
Team leader	Partner
Aries	Winnie
Ava	Philipp
Charette	Ivan
Lord	Eli
Mara	Jaz
Veejay	Bo

- Guest Judges: Carla Sibal and Sarah Meier
- Winner: Ava Paguyo
- Eliminated: Lord Maturan

=== "Nesvita Design Challenge" ===
- Guest Judge: Trina Abola, Nesvita group product manager, Nestlé Philippines
- Winner: Aries Lagat
- Eliminated: Charette Regala

Gonzales raised the issue of the team of Floresca and Parcon in the previous episode wherein they used a tank top (which the two considered as an accessory) to complete their outfit for that particular episode's challenge. However, the garment was neither made nor purchased. Jojie Lloren talked to both Gonzales and Floresca individually, and said that the judging panel concluded that Maturan's dress (which Gonzales collaborated on before Maturan was eliminated) would still have lost. Consequently, Lloren said that only materials that are either purchased or brought from the accessory wall are allowed to be worn on the models from hereon.

=== "Open Your Eyes" ===
- Guest Judge: Jun de Leon, high fashion photographer; and Mich Dulce, celebrity fashion designer and milliner
- Winner: Jaz Cerezo
- Eliminated: Winnie Chua

=== "Wedding Challenge" ===
- Guest Judge: Dennis Lustico, winner of Best in Bridal Design, Mega Fashion Awards 2007
- Winner: Eli Gonzales
- Eliminated: Bo Parcon

Gonzales ranted about his perceived bias that the judges are grooming Aries Lagat to win the competition, especially when one of the judges (whom he did not specify) is already familiar with Lagat and Veejay Floresca prior to taping.

=== "Beverly Hills 6750 Design Challenge" ===
- Guest Judge: Suzette Lopez, general manager, Beverly Hills 6750
- Winner: Aries Lagat
- Eliminated: None

The judges decided not to eliminate Ivan Raborar nor Mara Reyes, who were the bottom two designers, because they believed Gonzales created the worst design but he had immunity from his win in the previous episode.

=== "Pond's Design Challenge" ===
- Guest Judge: Mutya Laxa, marketing manager, Pond's
- Winner: Eli Gonzales
- Eliminated: Ava Paguyo and Ivan Raborar

=== "Cinderella Ready-To-Wear Challenge" ===
Eli	Jaz
Mara	Aries
Philipp	Veejay

- Guest Judge: Dennis Castillo, creative consultant, Cinderella
- Winner: Veejay Floresca
- Eliminated: Eli Gonzales

=== "Push Tradition Forward" ===
- Guest Judge: Michael Salientes, top stylist
- Winner: Mara Reyes
- Eliminated: Jaz Cerezo

=== "Terno Challenge" ===
- Guest Judge: Aimee Marcos, entrepreneur, musician, and adopted daughter of Imelda Marcos
- Winner: Philipp Tampus
- Eliminated: Mara Reyes

=== "Finale (part 1)" ===
Designer	Assistant Designer
Aries	Mara
Philipp	Lord
Veejay	Jaz

== Special episodes ==
No. overall	No. in season	Title	Original release date
12	1	"Reunion special"	October 15, 2008
All 14 designers gathered in the studio together with Herrera and Lloren as they discussed their experience on the show as well as how it affected them. It also served as an opportunity to discuss and put a closure on issues between designers. Laurel and Aberin-Sahdwani also appeared on the show, who expressed the difficulty of elimination. The episode was highlighted with an awarding of Fan Favorite (Eli Gonzales).
13	2	"Road to Runway"	October 22, 2008
This special episode looked back on the beginnings of Project Runway Philippines, from its auditions to the announcement of the final three designers. Highlights in this special include their shooting for the show's opening billboard, as well as various rivalries and other never-before-seen footage.

== Reception ==
Television and film critic Nestor Torre of Philippine Daily Inquirer wrote that he liked the show's "stylish approximation of the original American franchise, with Teresa Herrera ranking high among (his) list of the show's plus points." However, he criticized the subjectivity of judges' verdicts, adding that "their personal preferences sometimes clouded their judgment." He also expressed his hopes that the judges and mentors of the show go soft on their "tough love" approach, stating that the designers are "young and vulnerable." Opinion columnist Rina Jimenez-David, also from Philippine Daily Inquirer, wrote that Project Runway Philippines is "many times more interesting (than the American original), with more complex intrigues, better clothes, and more outspoken judges." She described Aberin-Sahdwani and Laurel as "unblinkingly honest," adding that the female judge's "insistence on quality, workmanship and attention to detail" was admirable.

Meanwhile, Mindy Baldemor of Manila Bulletin stated that Project Runway Philippines did not suffer from poor editing and general lack of personality and attitude that plagued Philippines' Next Top Model, which was also produced by Solar Entertainment. She added that the show "captured the essence of Project Runway: panic-inducing, competitive, semi-dramatic, but overall still chic." C. Mendez Legaspi of Business Mirror agreed with Baldermor's observations. However, the fashion journalist was not favorable of "the oft-times not-so-judicious choice of guest judges, the put-on cattiness of certain contestants, and the lame attempts at colegiala accents."

At the Final Runway, Ed Biado of Manila Standard Today wrote that "Tampus proved that his penchant for romance can be translated into something more than classic drapes," making him "a very strong contender." Meanwhile, he stated that Floresca's strength lies in "his impeccable ability to modernize his inspiration and make it his own," but he was "not too sure if that 'his own' is exciting enough." Biado declared Lagat as the clear winner, with a collection that was "architectural and every sewing technique is visibly used and executed flawlessly."

== Elimination charts ==
=== Designer competition ===
	1	2	3	4	5	6	7	8^{2}	9^{3}	10	11	15	Episode
Aries	WIN	IN	LOW	WIN	IN	IN	WIN	IN	HIGH	HIGH	LOW	WINNER	Finale
Philipp	LOW	WIN	HIGH	LOW	HIGH	IN	HIGH	LOW	LOW	LOW	WIN	RUNNER-UP	Finale
Veejay	HIGH	HIGH	IN	LOW	IN	HIGH	IN	IN	WIN	LOW	HIGH	3RD PLACE	Finale
Mara	LOW	HIGH	HIGH	IN	IN	LOW	LOW	IN	LOW	WIN	OUT		Terno Challenge
Jaz	IN	HIGH	HIGH	HIGH	WIN	HIGH	HIGH	HIGH	HIGH	OUT			Push Tradition Forward
Eli	IN	LOW	LOW	IN	LOW	WIN	LOW^{1}	WIN	OUT				Cinderella Ready-To-Wear Challenge
Ava	IN	LOW	WIN	IN	IN	LOW	IN	OUT					Pond's Design Challenge
Ivan	IN	IN	IN	HIGH	LOW	IN	LOW	OUT					Pond's Design Challenge
Bo	IN	IN	IN	IN	LOW	OUT							Wedding Challenge
Winnie	IN	IN	LOW	LOW	OUT								Open Your Eyes
Charette	HIGH	IN	IN	OUT									Nesvita Design Challenge
Lord	IN	IN	OUT										Hip Hop Meets Couture
Lorymer	LOW	OUT											13 Legends
Loida	OUT												Individuality as a Designer

- ^Note 1: In Episode 7 Eli have the worst design. Because Eli have immunity for winning the Episode 6 challenge, he was spared for elimination.
- ^Note 2: Since there were no elimination in Episode 7, the two designers with the lowest scores were eliminated in Episode 8.
- ^Note 3: Episode 9 is a team challenge. Eli and Jaz were selected as team leaders. Jaz's team got the highest score with Veejay winning for having the best design overall in the challenge. Eli's team got the lowest score and because he is the team leader he was eliminated.

Green background and WINNER means the designer won Project Runway Philippines.
Blue background and WIN means the designer won that challenge.
Turquoise background and HIGH means the designer had one of the highest scores for that challenge, and came in second.
Light blue background and HIGH means the designer had one of the highest scores for that challenge, but did not place in the top two.
Pink background and LOW means the designer had one of the lowest scores for that challenge, but was not eliminated.
Orange background and LOW means the designer was in the bottom two, but was not eliminated.
Violet background and LOW means the designer have the worst design but because of immunity the designer was spared for elimination.
Red background and OUT means the designer lost and was out of the competition.

=== Fashion model competition ===
Model	1	2	3	4	5	6	7	8	9	10	11	14	15
Lois	IN	IN	IN	WIN	IN	IN	WIN	IN	IN	IN	IN	IN	WINNER
Angel	IN	IN	IN	IN	IN	IN	IN	IN	WIN	IN	IN	IN	OUT
Paola	IN	IN	WIN	IN	IN	IN	IN	IN	IN	IN	WIN	IN	OUT
Jo-An	IN	IN	IN	IN	IN	IN	IN	IN	IN	WIN	IN	OUT	
Lexxi	IN	IN	IN	IN	IN	IN	IN	IN	IN	IN	OUT		
Michelle	IN	IN	IN	IN	IN	WIN	IN	WIN	IN	OUT			
Chris	WIN	IN	IN	IN	IN	IN	IN	IN	OUT				
Francy	IN	IN	IN	OUT			IN	IN	OUT				
Halley	IN	IN	IN	IN	IN	IN	OUT						
Jhenn	IN	IN	IN	IN	WIN	IN	OUT						
Sally	IN	IN	IN	IN	IN	OUT							
Kat	IN	WIN	IN	IN	OUT								
Chen	IN	IN	OUT										
Anna	IN	OUT											

Green background and WINNER means the model was paired with the winning designer, and won the competition.
Blue background and WIN means the model wore the winning design.
Teal background and WIN means the model was paired with the winning designer, but did not participate in the runway show.
Light blue background and IN means the model did not participate in the runway show.
Pink background and IN means the model wore the losing design.
Violet background and IN means the model was paired with the losing designer, but did not participate in the runway show.
Orange background and OUT means the model quit the competition.
Red background and OUT means the model was eliminated.

== Aftermath ==
Lagat and Tampus said in an interview with BusinessWorld that they are planning on putting up shops in Metro Manila, with Tampus also planning to open an atelier in Cebu City. Lagat has said he intends to use the prize money to create a men's wear collection, which he intends to showcase in February 2009. Meanwhile, Floresca (who already has a shop of his own) is in the process of completing a 45-piece collection that will be exhibited in Philippine Fashion Week Autumn/ Winter 2009. The three finalists are also toying with the idea of collaborating.
