= Project Runway Philippines season 3 =

Project Runway Philippines
- Season 3
- Promotional poster of Project Runway Philippines season 3, featuring new host Tweetie de Leon-Gonzales and the 15 designers hanging on a thread.
- No. of contestants: 15
- No. of episodes: 15

Release
- Original network: ETC
- Original release: March 25 – May 13, 2012

Additional information
- Filming dates: late 2011 – early 2012

Season chronology
- ← Previous; Season 2 Next → Season 4

The third season of Project Runway Philippines premiered on March 25, 2012, almost three years after its preceding season. It is shown on ETC, which has since ceased becoming a cable channel and transferred to RPN as a VHF channel. Tweetie de Leon-Gonzalez, a former model and president of Professional Models Association of the Philippines, is the new host replacing Teresa Herrera. Fashion designer Rajo Laurel and style columnist Apples Aberin returned as judges, while fashion designer Jojie Lloren remained as mentor.

The winner for this season will receive a 10-page fashion spread in Mega magazine, ₱500,000 (around US$11,700), a start-up business package including 10 sewing machines, a two-month apprenticeship with Asian Institute of Fashion, a Wacom Intuos4 professional pen tablet, an all-expenses-paid trip to Paris to experience Paris Fashion Week, and a full scholarship for a four-year bachelor's degree in Fashion Design program at iACADEMY.

== Auditions ==
Casting was held in four major cities in the Philippines namely Cagayan de Oro, Cebu, Baguio, and Makati from August to September 2011. Applicants can also submit their portfolio and other requirements through mail. The designers must be at least 21 years old.

== Contestants ==
The 15 designers competing in the third season of Project Runway Philippines consists of established designers, fashion design students, and new designers who used to have jobs unrelated to fashion. They were introduced on ETC's show Etcetera on February 12, 2012. Note that the ages listed are the designers' ages at the time the show was taped in late 2011. Also note that transgender designers, although not explicitly stated in the show, are referred as "she."

- Milka Quin Redoble, 34 years old from Pasig. A former banker, Redoble quit her job and enrolled in Slim’s Fashion and Art School. She set up an online fashion store. She was declared the winner of Project Runway Philippines Season 3, and being the first female to be on finale, and being the first female to win. her model was Annalita who also claimed the prize.
- Cheetah Rivera, 24 years old from Manila. Rivera pursued her fashion design dream since age 12. She studied in Philippine Fashion Institute and her designs were featured in local fashion magazines. she came as a runner-up.
- Nel Claveria, Jr., 30 years old from Camarines Sur. Claveria started out designing gowns for beauty pageants. He eventually ventured to Brunei Darussalam and designed for prominent clients. A self-taught designer, he admitted to have only learned about fashion illustration online. He came on 2nd runner-up.
- Amor Albano, 28 years old from Laoag City. At a young age, Albano started working as a fashion designer's assistant to make ends meet for her family. She has since become a prominent designer in the Philippines' northern region. she came on 3rd runner-up.
- Glenn Gonzales, 26 years old from Pangasinan. Born with congenital glaucoma, Gonzales worked as a design apprentice. Eliminated: June 3, 2012
- MJ Alminanza, 24 years old from Zambales. After a brief career in TV production, Alminanza enrolled in Fashion Institute of the Philippines for two years and landed a job as a visual merchandiser for an apparel store. Eliminated: May 27, 2012
- Jenno Gacasan, 24 years old from Cebu. Gacasan earned a degree in Painting and worked as a graphic designer. Eliminated: May 20, 2012
- Ionica Abrahan, 21 years old from Batangas. Abrahan graduated in De La Salle College of Saint Benilde with a degree in Fashion Design and Merchandising. She works as a fashion designer and stylist. - Eliminated - May 13, 2012
- Lhenvil Paneda, 21 years old from La Union. The youngest among the contestants, Paneda stopped halfway of his degree in Applied Physics in University of the Philippines Diliman and became a costume designer for movies and television productions. - Eliminated - May 06, 2012
- Joseph Montelibano, 35 years old from Iloilo. Living in New York City, Montelibano juggled through an assortment of jobs including public relations, visual merchandising, and fashion design. He had collaborated with Patricia Field in Sex and the City, Eric Daman in Gossip Girl, and Tina Knowles for House of Deréon. - Eliminated - April 29, 2012
- Enzo Libo-on, 23 years old from Bacolod. With Libo-on's parents adamant against his dream of becoming a fashion designer, he convinced his grandmother to teach him how to sew. He also pursued fashion design and worked as a call center agent to keep his parents happy. - Eliminated - April 22, 2012
- Yves Camingue, 25 years old from Cebu City. A "self-trained, self-taught designer," Camingue learned sewing techniques at home and apprenticed under prominent Cebu-based designers. - Eliminated - April 22, 2012
- Karla Galang, 27 years old from Quezon City. Galang teaches Patternmaking at Fashion Institute of the Philippines. - Eliminated - April 8, 2012
- Fatima Guerrero, 21 years old from Nueva Ecija. The only Muslim contestant in the competition, Guerrero studies Fashion Design and Merchandising at De La Salle College of Saint Benilde and Dressmaking at Slim's Fashion and Art School. - Eliminated - April 1, 2012
- Normannie Santos, 28 years old from Bulacan. Santos free-willingly abandoned his studies at a theological college to follow his dream of becoming a fashion designer. He found friends who trained him in jewelry making and eventually in tailoring. - Eliminated - March 25, 2012

=== Models ===
Model	Age
Annalita Vizcarra	17
Anna Dar	18
Anna Dolores	19
Bianca	18
Ella	21
Fayme	24
Jaja	22
Janelle	20
Kaila	17
Maan	19
Natasha	20
Nina	18
Ria	22
Stephanie	23
Zandra	23

- Zandra Flores and Ria Rabajante Joined Binibining Pilipinas 2013 where they are unplaced.
- Annalita VIzcarra Joined Mutya ng Pilipinas 2014 where she was unplaced.

== List of episodes ==
No. overall	No. in season	Title	Guest Judge(s)	Winner	Eliminated	Original release date
31	1	"The Defining Look"	Inno Sotto, noted Philippine fashion designer	Milka Quin Redoble	Normannie Santos	March 25, 2012
The fifteen designers gathered in Kilometer Zero located in Luneta Park, Manila. Gonzales and Lloren welcomed the designers and presented them with the first challenge, to create a garment that showed who they were as a "world-class Filipino fashion designer." In the location, there was a table with 30 fabrics of various quality and colors. The designers were told to pick two fabrics of their choice which they will use in creating their designs, but after they have gathered their materials, they were asked to pass their fabrics to the person beside them. They have one day to complete their design.
32	2	"Young and Indigenous"	Camille Co, fashion blogger and one of Mega magazine's best dressed	Nel Claveria, Jr.	Fatima Guerrero	April 1, 2012
The designers met with Lloren at Nayong Filipino, a cultural village located in Angeles City. They were introduced to Camille Co, a fashion blogger and socialite, who served as their client for this challenge. The designers were told to create a modern and youthful dress, but were later informed that they would have to use indigenous fabrics as their materials. They were given ₱2,000 (US$47) to purchase their indigenous fabrics and an additional ₱500 (US$12) for other materials.
33	3	"A Bag of Surprises"	Rocio Olbes, designer of Rocio Bags	Milka Redoble	Karla Galang	April 8, 2012
The designers met Gonzales on the runway. Before briefing them about their next challenge, the models walked on the runway, each carrying a clutch bag by Rocio. The designers must create a dress inspired from the handbag their models carried. However, the model had the option to switch their bag to that of another model. They were given a day to complete their design.
34	4	""Two" Good to be True"	Randy Ortiz, fashion designer	MJ Alminanza	None	April 15, 2012
De Leon woke the designers in their apartments, telling them to get ready in 30 minutes. They were then shuttled while blindfolded to a secret location, which was later revealed as Barasoain Church in Malolos City, Bulacan. They were grouped into six pairs, with Milka choosing Cheetah as her partner, while the rest were chosen at random. The designers were told to create a modern and innovative wedding dress, with one of the pair making the bridal gown while the other making the bridesmaid dress.
35	5	"Little Troubles"	Ruffa Gutierrez, model-actress and mother; Mandy de la Rama-Santos, owner of children's wear brand Tarte Tatin	Winning Team: Second Princess Other Team Best Designer: Glenn Gonzales	Yves Camingue and Enzo Libo-on	April 22, 2012
The designers were grouped into two teams, wherein they create a cohesive collection for Ruffa Gutierrez's children's wear line LORIN, which is named after her daughter. As the winning pair in the previous challenge, MJ and Jenno picked their respective team members. One member of each team, namely Amor and Cheetah, creates a complementary dress for the mother.
36	6	"Looking Ahead"	Rhett Eala, Philippine fashion designer	Amor Albano	Joseph Montelibano	April 29, 2012
The designers were in their working area when Jojie Lloren and Vanessa Tanco-Cualoping (President of iAcademy) visited and told the designers to follow them. They entered a classroom of iAcademy where the challenge was introduced. The designers were tasked to create men's street wear based on their vision of men's style years from now and they used Wacom Intuos4 Professional Pen Tablets as their sketch pad. Each designer has a male assistant who assists them in using the tablet. They were given 30 minutes to complete their sketch, with their assistants also serving as their models. The winner of this challenge receives an Intuos4, apart from what the grand winner will receive.
37	7	"Picture Perfect"	Sari Yap, President, CEO, and EIC of Mega Magazine	Amor Albano	Lhenvil Paneda	May 6, 2012
38	8	"Fashion Feast"	Margarita Fores, restaurateur	Milka Redoble	Ionica Abrahan	May 13, 2012
39	9	"Waste Not, Want Not"	Leeroy New, Sculptor	Cheetah Rivera	Jenno Gacasan	May 20, 2012
40	10	"The Golden Rule"	Jacq Yuengtian, Manager Beauty Brand	Cheetah Rivera	MJ Alminanza	May 27, 2012
41	11	"Last Ones Standing"	Lesley Mobo, Designer	Cheetah Rivera	Glenn Gonzales	July 3, 2012
42	12	"Recap Episode"	TBA	TBA	TBA	July 10, 2012
43	13	"The Reunion"	TBA	TBA	TBA	July 17, 2012
44	45	"Finale"	Lucy Torres-Gomez, Actress, Beauty Queen, Dancer & Fashion Icon	Milka Redoble	Runner-Up: Cheetah Rivera 2nd Runner-Up: Nel Claveria Jr. 3rd Runner-Up: Amor Albano	July 24, 2012
14	15	"Finale"	Lucy Torres-Gomez, Actress, Beauty Queen, Dancer & Fashion Icon	Milka Redoble	Runner-Up: Cheetah Rivera 2nd Runner-Up: Nel Claveria Jr. 3rd Runner-Up: Amor Albano	August 1, 2012

== Episode tables ==
=== Episode 2 - Young and Indigenous ===
Designer	Materials used
MJ	Inisa, Tapiña gumamela
Yves	Abel (checkered and striped)
Karla	Inisa
Jenno	Abel (checkered)
Nel	Binakol
Cheetah	White brocade
Fatima	Tiniri, Waffle
Lhenvil	Abel (checkered)
Enzo	Inisa
Ionica	Binakol, Tiniri
Joseph	Tapiña maria, silk
Amor	Pinilian
Milka	Tiniri
Glenn	Tiniri, Waffle

=== Episode 4 - "Two" Good to be True ===
Bridal Gown	Bridesmaid Dress
Cheetah	Milka
Enzo	Yves
Jenno	MJ
Joseph	Amor
Lhenvil	Ionica
Nel	Glenn

=== Episode 5 - Little Troubles ===
Team Second Princess	Team Dramarama
Joseph (Leader)	Nel (Leader)
MJ	Amor
Lhenvil	Jenno
Milka	Yves
Cheetah	Enzo
Ionica	Glenn

== Elimination chart ==
=== Designer competition ===
Designer Elimination Table
Designer	1	2	3^{1},^{2}	4^{3}	5^{4}	6	7	8	9^{5}	10	11^{6},^{7}	15	Eliminated Episode
Milka	WIN	IN	WIN	IN	HIGH	IN	LOW	WIN	HIGH	HIGH	LOW	WINNER	15 - Finale
Cheetah	HIGH	IN	HIGH	IN	IN	HIGH	IN	LOW	WIN	WIN	WIN	RUNNER UP	15 - Finale
Nel	IN	WIN	IN	HIGH	LOW	IN	LOW	IN	LOW	LOW	LOW	2ND RUNNER UP	15 - Finale
Amor	IN	HIGH	LOW	IN	LOW	WIN	WIN	LOW	IN	HIGH	HIGH	3RD RUNNER UP	15 - Finale
Glenn	IN	HIGH	IN	HIGH	WIN	HIGH	IN	IN	LOW	LOW	OUT		11 - Last Ones Standing
MJ	IN	IN	LOW	WIN	IN	IN	HIGH	HIGH	LOW	OUT			10 - The Golden Rule
Jenno	HIGH	LOW	IN	HIGH	LOW	IN	IN	IN	OUT				9 - Waste Not, Want Not
Ionica	IN	IN	HIGH	LOW	IN	IN	LOW	OUT					8 - Fashion Feast
Lhenvil	LOW	IN	IN	LOW	IN	LOW	OUT						7 - Picture Perfect
Joseph	IN	LOW	IN	IN	IN	OUT							6 - Looking Ahead
Enzo	LOW	HIGH	IN	LOW	OUT								4 - Two Good to be True / 5 - Little Troubles
Yves	IN	LOW	IN	LOW	OUT								4 - Two Good to be True / 5 - Little Troubles
Karla	IN	IN	OUT										3 - A Bag of Surprises
Fatima	LOW	OUT											2 - Young and Indigenous
Normannie	OUT												1 - The Defining Look

The designer won Project Runway Season Philippines Season 3.
The designer won the challenge.
The designer was in the top two, or the first announced into the top 3, but did not win.
The designer had one of the highest scores for that challenge, but did not win.
The designer had one of the lowest scores for that challenge, but was not eliminated.
The designer was in the bottom two or its equivalent, but was not eliminated.
The designer lost and was eliminated from the competition.

^1 The judges said that Cheetah was supposed to be the winner, but it was revoked as a result of a penalty. She shopped for materials beyond the allocated time limit. Thus, Milka was declared winner.

^2 Amor wanted to quit the competition because she landed in the bottom 3, thus she does not feel it is her destiny to be in the fashion world, but she later make up her mind to stay.

^3 The judges stated that both Enzo and Yves deserve to be eliminated, but they were given another chance.

^4 The judges announced that Team Second Princess (Joseph, Cheetah, Ionica, Lhenvil, Milka, MJ) was the winning team. However, they declared Glenn as the winning designer from the other team.

^5 Milka was told that she had one of the weakest designs, and would have been in the bottom had it not been for her immunity.

^6 Episodes 12 are recap episode. Episode 13 is a reunion episode.

^7 Episode 14 is a part one of the finale showdown, features the final 4 designer's journey, and their preparations in the final.

=== Fashion model competition ===
The model of the winning designer will be featured in a fashion spread in Mega magazine and its sister magazine titles. She will also receive a scholarship for a short course of her choice in iAcademy and ₱200,000 (US$4,600).

Model	1	2	3	4	5	6	7	8	9	10	11	14	15
Annalita	IN	IN	IN	IN	IN	IN	IN	WIN	IN	IN	IN	IN	WINNER
Natasha	IN	IN	IN	IN	IN	IN	WIN	IN	WIN	IN	WIN	IN	OUT
Zandra	IN	IN	WIN	IN	IN	IN	IN	IN	IN	IN	IN	IN	OUT
Maan	IN	IN	IN	IN	IN	IN	IN	IN	IN	IN	IN	IN	OUT
Ella	IN	IN	IN	IN	IN	IN	IN	IN	IN	IN	IN	OUT	
Ria	IN	IN	IN	IN	IN	IN	IN	IN	IN	IN	OUT		
Anna Dolores	IN	IN	IN	WIN	IN	IN	IN	IN	IN	OUT			
Stephanie	IN	IN	IN	IN	IN	IN	IN	IN	OUT				
Bianca	IN	IN	IN	IN	IN	IN	IN	OUT					
Fayme	IN	IN	IN	IN	IN	IN	OUT						
Jaja	IN	WIN	IN	IN	IN	IN	OUT						
Anna Dar	IN	IN	IN	IN	IN	IN	OUT						
Kaila	IN	IN	IN	OUT									
Janelle	WIN	IN	OUT										
Nina	IN	OUT											

Green background and WINNER means the model was paired with the winning designer, and won the competition.
Blue background and WIN means the model wore the winning design.
Light blue background and IN means the model did not participate in the runway show and were temporarily replaced by other models.
Pink background and IN means the model wore the losing design.
Red background and OUT means the model was eliminated.
