= Project Runway Philippines season 4 =

Project Runway Philippines
- Season 4
- No. of contestants: 15
- No. of episodes: 15

Release
- Original network: ETC
- Original release: June 14 – September 20, 2015

Additional information
- Filming dates: late 2014 – TBA

Season chronology
- ← Previous; Season 3 Next → TBA

The fourth season of Project Runway Philippines was announced in September 2014. ETC announced that there will be a fourth season and it will be premiered on June 14, 2015. Tweetie de Leon-Gonzalez reprised her role as host from last season. Fashion designer Rajo Laurel and style columnist Apples Aberin returned as judges, while fashion designer Jojie Lloren remained as mentor.

This season introduced a mentor save, wherein the mentor can save one eliminated contestant to return only once during the entire duration of the competition. An anonymous runway is also implemented to prevent the judges from knowing which fashion designer created which design until all designs have walked down the runway.

The winner will take home P250,000 to help start his/her own business line, another P250,000 from Brother International, a fashion spread in Mega Magazine, a trip for two to London, a scholarship in i-Academy, P100,000 worth of gift certificates from The Face Shop, P100,000 worth of gift certificates from Aivee Institute. The winning designer will also get a chance to showcase his or her collection in the Manila Fashion Festival.

The winner was Jose Joy Chicano from Eastern Samar, with Jared Servaño from Koronadal City, South Cotabato and Celine Borromeo from Cebu City as 2nd and 3rd runners-up respectively.

== Auditions ==
Casting call was held in major cities in the Philippines: Baguio, Abreeza Mall Davao, Cebu, and Manila. Applicants could still pre-register online. applicants must fill up the online form. must be 21 years of age and a resident of the Philippines, and can Be able to sketch, cut and sew competently.

== Contestants ==
The 15 designers who were chosen:

Name	Age	Hometown	Placement
Orville Biongcog	24	Cebu City	14-15
Rauj Pangue	27	Tacloban	14-15
Melai Annang	27	Tuguegarao City	13
Windell Madis	34	Ilocos Norte	11-12
Enzo Habulan	21	Antipolo	11-12
Jinggay Serag	35	Quezon City	10
AJ Bernabe	32	Quezon City	9
Vin Orias	27	Manila	8
Justin Oropeza	24	Antipolo	7
Joyce Maw	22	Cebu City	5-6
Romel Tumulak	46	Cebu City	5-6
Shieltiel Calamba	31	Cavite	4
Celine Borromeo	22	Cebu City	2-3
Jared Servaño	44	Koronadal City	2-3
Jose Joy Chicano	21	Eastern Samar	Winner

=== Models ===
Model	Age
Ann Casas	20
Kaila Estrada	19
Kar Sison	24
Rose Joy Pinuela	21
Bea Aguilar	23
Aika Yurena Moreno	17
Sheena Cesar	17
Marivic Juan	27
Joy Aimee Flores	18
Karmina Lopena	25
Anelia Asuncion	20
Malou Garong	19
Zyxelle Llamares	22
Winchel Lopez	20
Amanda Chan	16

== Episodes ==
No. overall	No. in season	Title	Guest( Judge)(s)	Winner	Eliminated	Original release date
46	1	"Sew Legit"	Francis Libiran, the latest A-list designer featured in America's Next Top Model, Cycle 18.	Jared Servaño	Orville Biongcog & Rauj Pangue	June 14, 2015
The designers were asked to create an outfit that showcases their design aesthetic but must hack into another designer's previous work for their materials.
47	2	"Sky High"	Robby Carmona, a fashion director.	Celine Borromeo	Melai Annang	June 21, 2015
The designers were asked to create a high fashion ensemble for a jet-setter. Each designer chose a country as inspiration. Table: Contestant / Country; AJ / Brazil; Celine / USA; Enzo / UK; Jared / Indonesia; Jinggay / Scotland; Joy / Japan; Justin / Kenya; Maw / Turkey; Melai / Egypt; Romel / China; Shieliel / Australia; Vin / Madagascar; Windell / India
48	3	"Good Enough to Eat"	Ito Kish, one of the country's successful designer consultant.	Joy Chicano	None	June 28, 2015
The designers were divided into four teams of three. they are then given a task to create designs according to their given dishes. At the middle of the first day, Celine who was too sick, was allowed to rest, leaving an annoyed Jinggay and Vin who was left to create their piece. After the next day Celine returned to finish her design. Table: Team / Dish / AJ, Romel, Windell; Celine, Jinggay, Vin; Jared, Maw, Joy; Enzo, Justin, Shieltz
49	4	"The Modern Filipina"	Guest Judge(s): Jc Buendia, dressed two Philippine heads of state; Benigno Aquino III and Gloria Macapagal Arroyo Special Guest: Shamcey Supsup	Celine Borromeo	Windell Madis & Enzo Habulan	July 5, 2015
The designers were brought to Paco Park, Manila, where a carabao caravan full of indigenous materials appear. The designers were given 3 minutes to get the materials they need and create high-fashion, wearable, and fashion-forward pieces that showcases the modern Filipina. Unfortunately, Windell was not able to compete on getting the materials leaving him with sinamay, the only thing he thought was workable. Enzo had difficulty using his materials since they were very hard to work with, making him change his design and start from scratch the following day. Celine and Vin redeemed their selves from the previous week; while Jared continued to impress the judges. The three were declared the top 3 of the week, and Celine was declared the winner of the challenge. Romell, Enzo, and Windell were declared the bottom 3, but only Romell was saved because of his techniques, sending Enzo and Windell home.
50	5	"If The Shoe Fits"	Joyce Makitao, world-renowned jewelry designer	Romel Tumulak	Jinggay Serag	July 12, 2015
The designers are tasked to create an ensemble that takes inspiration from shoes. The twist is that they must outbid one another to be able to get the shoes they want. Each designer was able to get the shoes they want except from Jinggay who did not won any bid. Shieltz encountered some problems on his design at the last minute, because of forgetting to sew the back part of his design. Jared, Romel, AJ & Joy took the highest scores but Romel was deemed the winner while Jinggay and Shieltz landed in the bottom two. The judges had hard time on deciding which designer will be saved; Shieltz for his safe yet good looking designs or Jinggay for her well-Tailored and clean yet boring clothes. In the end Shieltz was saved because of his design and Jinggay was sent packing.
51	6	"Crazy Challenge"	Maureen Disini - well known for her resorts wear pieces.	Romel Tumulak	AJ Bernabe	July 19, 2015
The designers were brought into a resort. surprisingly, Tweetie de Leon-Gonzalez is their client for the beach wear. They were brought to Carolina's Lace shop to pick their garments and fabrics. While their design is on progress, Jojie appeared, and told them to swap and switch places who ever is on their side and front. All the designers were shocked. AJ, who was one of the shocked designers got outside to catch some fresh air. Vin, Celine and Joy also had trouble redesigning the designs of the other designer. AJ is very positive about her design to be safe before the runway starts. After the tough deliberation, Maw and Shieltz were deemed safe. Romel, Jared and Justin got the highest scores. Despite Jared who continues to show great designs, Romel once again beat Jared. Immunity was also removed from next week, meaning all of them are in danger of elimination. Justin was also safe. Celine was also deemed safe even Apples told her that she keeps saying excuses. Joy, Vin and AJ landed in the bottom 3. Joy for his lack of idea, Vin on his unsafe & unmovable design and AJ whom the judges called her design referred as 'Puruntong' and also unflattering. In the end, AJ was eliminated for her poor design.
52	7	"Rush Hour Challenge"	Tippi Ocampo - represented Philippines in Paris fashion week; known for her RTW designs.	Joy Chicano	Vin Orias	July 26, 2015
The remaining designers were surprised by mentor, Jojie Lloren by visiting their penthouse early in the morning. They were sent to the work room and was told about their next challenge - a RTW collection. A part of the challenge is to also finish the challenge in 8 hours. The top two designers from last week's challenge, Romel and Jared were called out and were tasked as team leaders for this week's challenge. They were also asked to pick their team members. Both teams were praised by their mentor in the initial mentoring session. Vin struggled with time and other designers including Joy thought of Romel's garment as too simple. In the runway, Jared's team (Team Father) outshined Romel's (Team Mother) and were therefore given immunity in the said challenge. Joy was praised for his ability to tone down his aesthetic and showing a very clean work. Shieltz and Maw were also given positive feedback. Jared was deemed the weakest link in the group but because their team won, he was saved from elimination. Romel's team was criticised for seemingly having two different collections in the runway. Celine, though, was praised for having successfully finished her first pants and Justin was also praised for his look though given a few tips to improve his garment. Romel and Vin placed in the bottom. Romel for having a very simple and dated look and Vin for some technical problems in his garment. In the end, Romel was spared and Vin was sent home. This week they were divided into two teams of four. Teams: Team members / Team name; Romel, Vin, Justin & Celine / Team Mother; Jared, Joy, Shieltz & Maw / Team Father
53	8	"Another Unconventional Challenge"	Jo Ann Bitangcol - One of the country's renowned photographer and also a fashion model.	Celine Borromeo	Justin Oropeza	August 2, 2015
The remaining seven designers were instructed by Tweetie, through video, to go outside the building and wait for the special materials which they would use for the challenge. A garbage truck appears, lowering piles of recyclable materials and were told to make a high fashion ensemble using those materials. During the challenge, some designers had problems such as Joy who changed his design at the last minute. After the runway show Jared was deemed safe, Celine and Romel got praised on their designs, Maw and Shieltz receive mixed feed backs and Joy and Justin received bad feed backs. Celine got her third win on the challenge, beating Romel. Joy was spared from elimination because he had immunity. Shieltz was also deemed safe, even the judges though he was always on the safe side and was told to be more adventurous. Maw escaped elimination while Justin was sent home for his poor design as the judges referred as he only cut and paste his design.
54	9	"Grace Under Pressure"	Guest Judge: Laureen Uy - The country's #1 fashion blogger; one of the official ambassadors of Pond's. Special Guest: Mian Datu	Celine Borromeo	none	August 9, 2015
The final six designers were brought to the runway. Apparently they were shocked because six random girls appeared on their front; as well as Mian Datu, the Pond's manager. They were given a task to recreate the pond's recent uniform since it was used five years and still running. they were each asked to follow some rules, such as workable, feminine, professional and with its original color gray. the designers also had time to call their loved ones. Shieltz who had received a bad news from home, but he still continued on the competition (his mom was mild stroked). During the runway show, there were some good and bad feed backs. Celine got good comments but the one which the judges dislike is her turtleneck, but otherwise, it was good. Maw explained her design and took a lot of time explaining it, but the judges felt her design was great as well. Joy receive good and bad feed backs as well, but the judge's favorite part of his design is that he used pants. In the End Celine won her 4th win in a second consecutive time even all of them failed to execute their designs. Jared was also safe even he had some technical problems and having over designed his top. Shieltz and Romel fall into the bottom 2, but Shieltz was saved due to his design even he had bad taste on fabrics and it was too old and boring, sending Romel home because of his unchanged design of the recent style of the uniform. it was shown that all of them are praising Romel. In the last segment while Romel was packing his things, it was revealed that Jojie saved him from elimination and he will continue on the competition, but two designers will go home the following week.
55	10	"Men's Wear!!!"	Gabe Norwood - Two time member of Gilas Pilipinas; Plays in Rain & Shine team on PBA.	Shieltz	Joyce Maw & Romel Tumulak	August 16, 2015
The remaining 6 designers were brought into the NBA store. What they did not know is they will be doing a try out on basketball, as they will be also designing for male clothing. The score they get means the order of picking their basketball team jerseys. Joy came first, followed by Shieltz, Jared, Celine and Maw, and ultimately Romel who was left with the last jersey. While their design is on progress, their models appeared, where in Shieltz used his model's jacket to get its size, but Romel who thinks that Shieltz is cheating. Jojie subsequently arrived, and while mentoring them, he gave the designers chance to change their chosen fabrics. Romel and Jared elected to use their chance to get new fabrics while the others stay behind and continue their designs. At the runway there were some mixed critics to the designers. Rajo praised Shieltz for his design and its also his first time to shine as a designer. Celine also got praised for her design but lacking the color patterns on her chosen jersey that could affect her score; Joy for his design had mixed thoughts - where Apples and tweetie referred his design as 'Michael Jackson'. Jared was asked about his over designed jacket and criticized for his lack of design purpose. Maw also got bad feedbacks on her design as they referred her design as 'Clownish'. Apples was very regretful on Romel for having his second chance, as Romel added some bad taste on his design. In the end, Shieltz won his first challenge beating Celine and Joy. Jared, Maw and Romel landed on the bottom 3. Maw was the first eliminated, followed by Romel where a tearful Jared leaves the stage. In the post ending credits, it was shown that Maw and Romel were dancing joyously as they were going home.
56	11	"Avant garde"	Guest Judge: Peewee Reyes-Isidro - Mega Magazine Editor-in-chief; Special Guest: Vanessa Tanco	Joy	Shieltz Calamba	August 23, 2015
The final 4 designers were brought to the IAcademy, where in they were given a task to create an Avant Garde design about the happenings in our society today, and how they can see the future. They were given 30 minutes to sketch their design, as a pool of IAcademy students came out to help them. they were given one day to finish the task. After Jojie mentored the designers, he gave them another twist which is they need to do a second design where in it should be wearable. They were more even shocked to see four returning eliminated designers- AJ who was paired up with Celine, Jinggay who were paired up to Shieltz, Enzo who was paired up to Joy and Justin who was paired with Jared. there were some issues with the eliminated and the remaining designers where in AJ, Jinggay and Justin annoyed and does not even care what they are doing, if they are even helping or not since they are eliminated. After the runway, the judges had mixed critics and upset with the designs. Joy was praised for his taste and knowledge; Jared was criticized for his repetitive designs; Celine for her lack of ability to show her talent; and Shieltz for his again unpaired design and frayed fabrics. In the end Joy was deemed the winner of the challenge and was sent through the finals. Jared was also deemed safe to be in the final 3. It was down to Celine and Shieltz who was fighting for the last slot. In the end, the judges gave Celine a second chance since she showed great on previous performances, securing the last slot in the finale, while Shieltz was sent home barely making it to the final three.
57	12	"Special Recap"	TBD	TBD	N/A	August 30, 2015
The journey of the final 3 designers are all collaborated here in this episode.
59	14	"Reunion"	?	?	N/A	September 13, 2015
All the contestants returned for a special reunion and talked about their experiences and hilarious moments on the show.
58	13	"Finale"	TBA	TBA	TBA	September 6, 2015
60	15	"Finale"	TBA	TBA	TBA	September 20, 2015

== Designer progress ==
Designer Elimination Table
Designer	1	2	3 ^{1} ^{2}	4	5 ^{3}	6 ^{4} ^{5}	7 ^{6} ^{7} ^{8}	8 ^{9}	9 ^{10}	10 ^{11} ^{12}	11	12 ^{13}	13 ^{14}	14 & 15	Eliminated Episode
Joy	IN	HIGH	WIN	IN	HIGH	LOW	WIN	LOW	HIGH	HIGH	WIN	IN	ADV	WINNER	Ep. 15: Finale
Jared	WIN	IN	HIGH	HIGH	HIGH	HIGH	IN	IN	LOW	LOW	HIGH	IN	ADV	Runner-Up	Ep. 15: Finale
Celine	IN	WIN	LOW	WIN	IN	IN	LOW	WIN	WIN	HIGH	LOW	WIN	ADV	3rd Place	Ep. 15: Finale
Shieltz	IN	IN	IN	IN	LOW	IN	HIGH	LOW	LOW	WIN	OUT				Ep. 11: Avant Garde
Romel	HIGH	LOW	IN	LOW	WIN	WIN	LOW	HIGH	SAVED	OUT					Ep. 10: Men's Wear!!!
Maw	IN	IN	HIGH	IN	IN	IN	HIGH	LOW	HIGH	OUT					Ep. 10: Men's Wear!!!
Justin	IN	LOW	IN	IN	IN	HIGH	LOW	OUT							Ep. 8: Another Unconventional Challenge
Vin	HIGH	IN	LOW	HIGH	IN	LOW	OUT								Ep. 7: The Rush Hour Challenge
Aj	LOW	IN	IN	IN	HIGH	OUT									Ep. 6: Bait and Switch
Jinggay	IN	IN	LOW	IN	OUT										Ep. 5: If The Shoe Fits
Enzo	IN	IN	IN	OUT											Ep. 4: The Modern Filipina
Windell	LOW	HIGH	IN	OUT											Ep. 4: The Modern Filipina
Melai	IN	OUT													Ep. 2: Sky High
Orville	OUT														Ep. 1: Sew Legit
Rauj	OUT														Ep. 1: Sew Legit

- ^Note 1: Jinggay and Vin avoided elimination since Celine can't be eliminated because of her immunity; because of that, two people will be eliminated the next episode.
- ^Note 2: Romel was lucky that he was deemed safe because of his team's score.
- ^Note 3: Aside from immunity, Romel also received 10,000 pesos
- ^Note 4: Celine got one of the lowest scores but was safe.
- ^Note 5: Romel won a 3 night stay vacation for two on a beach.
- ^Note 6: Immunity will be no longer active this week since it is a team challenge.
- ^Note 7: Jared was not eliminated since he was on the winning team. On the other hand, Celine and Justin receive positive feedbacks though their team lost.
- ^Note 8: Joy won a 1-year apprenticeship program from Rajo Laurel.
- ^Note 9: Celine won Php 50,000 worth of The Face shop products.
- ^Note 10: Romel was saved by the mentor's save.
- ^Note 11: Immunity will be no longer active starting this week.
- ^Note 12: Shieltz won 4 tickets on an NBA show, thus Php 10,000 worth gift certificate from the NBA store.
- ^Note 13: Episode 12 is a recap episode, so no one is eliminated.
- ^Note 14: Episode 13 is finale part 1, so no one is eliminated.

The designer won Project Runway Philippines Season 4.
The designer advances to the finale.
The designer won the challenge.
The designer was in the top two, or the first announced into the top 3, but did not win.
The designer had one of the highest scores for that challenge, but did not win.
The designer had one of the lowest scores for that challenge, but was not eliminated.
The designer was in the bottom two or its equivalent, but was not eliminated.
The designer was part of the winning team but did poorly in the challenge
The designer had the worst design but because of immunity, was spared from elimination.
The designer was saved by the mentor from elimination.
The designer lost and was eliminated from the competition.

== Model Elimination Table ==
Designer	1	2	3	4	5	6	7	8	9	10	11	12	13	14
Kar	IN	WIN	IN											
Mabelle														
Rose Joy														
Shane														
Zarah														
Ann														

Green background and WINNER means the model was paired with the winning designer, and won the competition.
Blue background and WIN means the model wore the winning design.
Light blue background and IN means the model did not participate in the runway show and were temporarily replaced by other models.
Pink background and IN means the model wore the losing design.
Red background and OUT means the model was eliminated.
