= Manila Fashion Festival =

Fashion event

- Genre: Clothing and fashion exhibitions
- Frequency: Biannually
- Location: Manila (primarily at Edsa Shangri-La Manila)
- Inaugurated: 2014
- Organizer: GO Lifestyle Group (previously organized by Art Personas Inc)

Manila Fashion Festival (MFF) is a major fashion event held bi-annually in Manila, Philippines showcasing both local and international designers each season. Following the festival's principal sponsorship with Panasonic starting with the Fall/Winter 2018 show last April 2018, the event was renamed to Panasonic Manila Fashion Festival (PMFF).

== History and Organization ==
Manila Fashion Festival was founded by Art Personas, Inc. in 2014, in partnership with One Globe Ltd. The event aims to showcase world-class artistic production and strengthen brand presence through creative execution. Manila Fashion Festival is now succeeded by GO Lifestyle Group with a new innovative formula.

=== Early seasons ===
The first Manila Fashion Festival show was held in November 11–14, 2014 at the Green Sun Hotel which featured designs from the brand ARIN and collections from its first roster of designers: Renan Pacson, Sassa Jimenez, Mark Bumgarner, Pablo Cabahug, Cheetah Rivera, Anthony Ramirez, Jaz Cerezo, Vania Romoff, Yevgeniya Alexandrovna Yushkova, Veejay Floresca, and Chris Diaz. The show was voted as Best Fashion Show of 2014 by the online fashion magazine Stylebible.ph.

Shortly after its first season, the Fall/Winter 2015 collections were showcased from March 19 to 22, 2015 and featured more fashion designers including Jerome Salaya Ang, Happy Andrada, Odelon Simpao, Rhett Eala, Banggo Niu and Ziggy Savella. The Spring/Summer 2016 collections were showcased from October 23 to 25, 2015 and featured Randy Ortiz, and Project Runway Philippines Season 4 winner, Joy Chicano. The Fall/Winter 2016 collections were showcased on a 4-day run from April 11 to 14, 2016 held on a new venue at Marquee Tent, Edsa Shangri-La Manila and featured collections from 25 fashion designers including newcomer Brit Tripudio. It also featured several brand collections from Lauquen, Coca-Cola Dress Coke, Seven Fridays, and ARIN. Manila Fashion Festival also hosted graduation shows from iAcademy and SoFA Design Institute fashion schools.

=== MFF Now, Next and Beyond ===
The Manila Fashion Festival Now collections ran from October 18 to 21, 2016 with a collaboration with the Embassy of Netherlands, featured over 60 designers and 10 brands and observed resetting of fashion timeline and the "See Now, Buy Now" concept. Manila Fashion Festival Next ran from March 21 to 24, 2017 and Manila Fashion Festival Beyond featuring 50 designers and design collaboration with AirAsia ran from October 17 to 20, 2017.

=== Panasonic sponsorship ===
Starting the eighth season which ran from April 10 to 13, 2018, the show was officially renamed to Panasonic Manila Fashion Festival with Panasonic as the naming sponsor of the event. The eighth season also featured designers from Cebu and Davao regions with their Fall/Winter 2018 collections. The ninth season which ran from October 16 to 19, 2018 featured over 40 local designers and a handful of designers from Southeast Asia.

=== PMFFX and Fifth Anniversary Season ===
In April 2–5, 2019, Panasonic Manila Fashion Festival held its tenth season with the theme “Fashion Formation Decoded” with Zilingo as its co-presenter. In October 15–18, 2019, Panasonic Manila Fashion Festival celebrated its fifth anniversary with the theme “Celebrate Fashion, Celebrate Life”. Held in EDSA Shangri-la, the fifth anniversary season was sponsored by San Mig Light which also presented a show along with Philippine Textile Research Institute with designs by designer Yong Davalos.

=== Panasonic Beauty Lifestyle Talks ===
As Panasonic Philippines being its naming sponsor, Panasonic Manila Fashion Festival also hosts Panasonic Beauty Lifestyle Talks, a series of talks with topics related to beauty and fashion. It also features products from the brand of Panasonic Beauty in relation to the topics of the talks. The series of talks are held in the afternoon, prior to the main evening fashion shows.

== Capsule Collection ==
Manila Fashion Festival launched its first capsule collection last May 27, 2015 which featured collaboration of fashion designer M Barretto and menswear clothing line brand OutKast Paradigm.
