= What Isn't There =

- Filipino: Ang Nawawala
- Directed by: Marie Jamora
- Written by: Marie Jamora; Ramon de Veyra
- Starring: Dominic Roco; Dawn Zulueta; Boboy Garovillo; Annicka Dolonius; Felix Roco
- Cinematography: Leung Ming Kai
- Edited by: Marie Jamora; Edsel Abesames
- Music by: Mikey Amistoso; Diego Mapa; Jazz Nicolas
- Production companies: Indie Pop Films; Brainchild Studios
- Distributed by: Brainchild Studios
- Release dates: July 21, 2012 (Cinemalaya); September 12, 2012 (Philippines)
- Running time: 155 minutes
- Country: Philippines
- Languages: Filipino, English

What Isn’t There (Filipino: Ang Nawawala) is a 2012 Philippine new wave film co-written and directed by Marie Jamora. The film stars Dominic Roco, Dawn Zulueta, Boboy Garovillo, Felix Roco, and Annicka Dolonius. The film was first screened as part of the 2012 Cinemalaya Philippine Independent Film Festival where it competed under the New Breed category.

Ang Nawawala won the Audience Choice and Best Original Music Score awards during the Cinemalaya competition.

== Synopsis ==
Gibson Bonifacio stopped speaking when he was a child.

Now twenty years old, he is back in Manila for Christmas. While always festive in the Philippines, the holiday remains tinged with sadness for his family because it marks the anniversary of his twin brother’s death. Against the backdrop of the vibrant local music scene, his childhood best friend tries to reconnect with him, while he unexpectedly finds a chance at his first, real romantic relationship.

Gibson reconsiders and redefines his relationship with his family, with himself, even with the only person he talks to: his dead brother.

== Cast ==
- Dominic Roco as Gibson Bonifacio
- Annicka Dolonius as Enid
- Dawn Zulueta as Esme Bonifacio
- Boboy Garovillo as Wes Bonifacio
- Felix Roco as Jamie Bonifacio
