= Project Runway Philippines =

Television series

- Project Runway Philippines logo
- Created by: Eli Holzman
- Written by: Jan Cabanos; Anne Lozano (season 2)
- Directed by: Marie Jamora (season 1); Jay Ortega (season 2); Henri de Lorme (season 3)
- Presented by: Teresa Herrera (season 1-2); Tweetie de Leon-Gonzales (season 3-4)
- Starring: Jojie Lloren; Apples Aberin; Rajo Laurel
- Theme music composer: Diego Mapa
- Country of origin: Philippines
- Original languages: Mainly English, with Filipino
- No. of seasons: 4
- No. of episodes: 32

Production
- Executive producers: Wilson Tieng; Peter Chanliong (for Solar Entertainment); Maricel Royo; Marivic San Juan (for Unitel); Edel Pepito; Anne Coronel (for ETC)
- Running time: approximately 45 minutes
- Production companies: Solar Entertainment Corporation; Unitel Productions (season 1)

Original release
- Network: ETC
- Release: July 30, 2008 – September 20, 2015

Project Runway Philippines is the Philippine adaptation of the American reality show Project Runway. This reality television series, which aims to find "the next big Filipino fashion designer," is produced by Solar Entertainment Corporation and Unitel Productions. It is shown on ETC. The series has an erratic airing schedule, as seasons 1 and 2 aired in 2008 and 2009, season 3 in 2012, and season 4 in 2015. The show was hosted by model and actress Teresa Herrera during the first two seasons. She was replaced by Filipina fashion legend Tweetie de Leon. Fashion designer Jojie Lloren serves as mentor since the first season while Filipino top model and lifestyle feature writer Apples Aberin and fashion designer Rajo Laurel complete the judging panel. The series fourth season ended on September 20, 2015.

Seasons 1-2 judges from left: Rajo Laurel, Apples Aberin, Teresa Herrera, and Jojie Lloren as mentor

== Judges ==
Judges on Project Runway Philippines
Judge	Season			
Judge	1	2	3	4
Tessa Herrera	Main	Main		
Apples Aberin	Main	Main	Main	Main
Rajo Laurel	Main	Main	Main	Main
Jojie Lloren (mentor)	Main	Main	Main	Main
Tweetie de Leon-Gonzalez			Main	Main

== Seasons ==
Season	Episodes	Originally released	
Season	Episodes	First released	Last released
1	15	July 30, 2008	November 12, 2008
2	15	August 12, 2009	December 9, 2009
3	15	March 25, 2012	May 13, 2012
4	15	June 14, 2015	September 20, 2015

Season	Number of Designers	Winning Designer	First Runner-Up	Second Runner-Up	Winning Designer's Prizes	Winning Model's Prizes
Season	Number of Designers	Winning Designer	First Runner-Up	Third Runner-Up	Winning Designer's Prizes	Winning Model's Prizes
1	14	Aries Lagat	Philipp Tampus	Veejay Floresca	₱500,000 cash prize; A star knkt-up business package; An editorial spread in Mega magazine; An opportunity to show their collection in Philippine Fashion Week	
2	13	Manny Marquez	Russell Villafuerte	Santi Obcena	₱500,000 cash prize; A start-up business package; An editorial spread in Preview magazine; An opportunity to show their collection in Philippine Fashion Week; A summer scholarship from Istituto Marangoni, the European partner of School of Fashion and the Arts	A winning of Champion Cigarette, More International Cigarettes
3	15	Milka Quin Redoble	Cheetah Rivera	Nel Claveria, Jr.	₱500,000 cash prize; A start-up business package of 10 sewing machines; A two-month apprenticeship with Asian Institute of Fashion; A Wacom Intuos4 professional pen tablet; An all-expenses-paid trip to Paris to experience Paris Fashion Week; A full scholarship for a four-year bachelor's degree in Fashion Design program at iACADEMY	A fashion spread in Mega magazine along with two other magazine titles; A short course of choice at iACADEMY; ₱200,000 cash prize
3	15	Milka Quin Redoble	Cheetah Rivera	Amor Albano	₱500,000 cash prize; A start-up business package of 10 sewing machines; A two-month apprenticeship with Asian Institute of Fashion; A Wacom Intuos4 professional pen tablet; An all-expenses-paid trip to Paris to experience Paris Fashion Week; A full scholarship for a four-year bachelor's degree in Fashion Design program at iACADEMY	A fashion spread in Mega magazine along with two other magazine titles; A short course of choice at iACADEMY; ₱200,000 cash prize
4	15	Jose Joy Chicano	Jared Servaño	Celine Borromeo	₱500,000 cash prize in total; ₱250,000 from Brother International; An editorial spread in Mega magazine; A trip for two to London; A scholarship at iACADEMY; ₱100,000 worth of gift certificates from Aivee Institute; ₱100,000 worth of gift certificates from The Face Shop; An opportunity to showcase his or her collection in the Manila Fashion Festival	

=== Season 1 (2008) ===
The first season of Project Runway Philippines premiered on July 30, 2008. The winner received P500,000 (roughly US$11,000) in cash, a start-up business package, an editorial spread in Mega magazine, and an opportunity to show their collection in Philippine Fashion Week. The final three designers, as revealed in the Finale episode, would get to design a clothing line to be sold exclusively in SM Makati and SM Ortigas, while the winner would display his collection in SM Makati. The Final Runway show was held on October 23, 2008, at the SMX Convention Center in Pasay, with New York-based handbag and accessories designer Rafé Totengco and notable shoe designer Cesar Gaupo as guest judges. Aries Lagat of Iligan City was declared the winner, beating Philipp Tampus of Lapu-Lapu City and Veejay Floresca of Makati.

=== Season 2 (2009) ===
The second season of Project Runway Philippines premiered on August 12, 2009. Model and actress Teresa Herrera returns as the program's host, while fashion designers Jojie Lloren and Rajo Laurel renew their mentorship and judging duties respectively, with top model and fashion columnist Apples Aberin-Sahdwani completing the judging panel. Thirteen (13) designers from all over the Philippines compete in weekly fashion design challenges to earn a spot in Philippine Fashion Week. The winner of this season received P500,000, an editorial spread in Preview magazine, a start-up business package, and a summer scholarship from Istituto Marangoni, which is the European partner of School of Fashion and the Arts. Manny Marquez of San Pedro, Laguna, was declared winner, while runner-up Russell Villafuerte of San Jose, Antique, eventually won the first season of Generation Mega—also shown on ETC—a year later.

=== Season 3 (2012) ===
ETC has announced that there will be a third season, which will premiere on March 25, 2012. Solar Entertainment Corporation, which handles the production, stated that the three-year gap from the previous season was due to "internal concerns" it needed to address as ETC moves from cable to a "free-to-air" format. The company also introduced Tweetie de Leon-Gonzalez, a former model and president of Professional Models Association of the Philippines, as the new host.

The winner of this season will receive P500,000 (or more), a feature on Mega magazine, a start-up business package, a short-term fashion design course at a "top European design school," and a four-year scholarship at Asian Institute of Fashion, which includes a two-month apprenticeship with it faculty of top fashion designers.

Casting were held in Cagayan de Oro, Cebu City, Baguio, and Makati. Aspiring participants may also send their audition videos to Solar Entertainment Corporation's office in Makati. Milka Quin Redoble was declared the winner, Cheetah Rivera as runner-up, Nel Claveria as 2nd and Amor Albano as 3rd.

=== Season 4 (2015) ===
In September 2014, ETC announced that there will be a fourth season. the season premiere will be on 2015. Auditions was held on Cebu, Manila, Davao and Baguio. Online auditions are opened as well calling all aspiring designers, they should pre-register first before submitting their online form.

The winner of Season 4 will take home P250,000 to help start his/her own business line, another P250,000 from Brother International, a fashion spread in Mega Magazine, a trip for two to London, a scholarship in i-Academy, P100,000 worth of gift certificates from The Face Shop, P100,000 worth of gift certificates from Aivee Institute. The winning designer will also get a chance to showcase his or her collection in the Manila Fashion Festival.

Season 4 premiered June 14, 2015. Tweetie De Leon-Gonzales returned as host/judge of the show. Jojie Lloren reprises his role as mentor for the contestants while Apples Aberin and Rajo Laurel returned as judges. This season introduced the "Mentor Save", wherein the mentor can save one eliminated contestant to return in the competition. The Season Finale aired September 20, 2015, showcasing the collection of the Final 3. Jose Joy Chicano of Eastern Samar was declared the winner, beating Jared Servaño of Koronadal City, South Cotabato (taking runner-up position) and Celine Borromeo of Cebu City (placing 2nd runner-up).
