= Monster Jimenez =

Filipino screenwriter, director, producer and editor

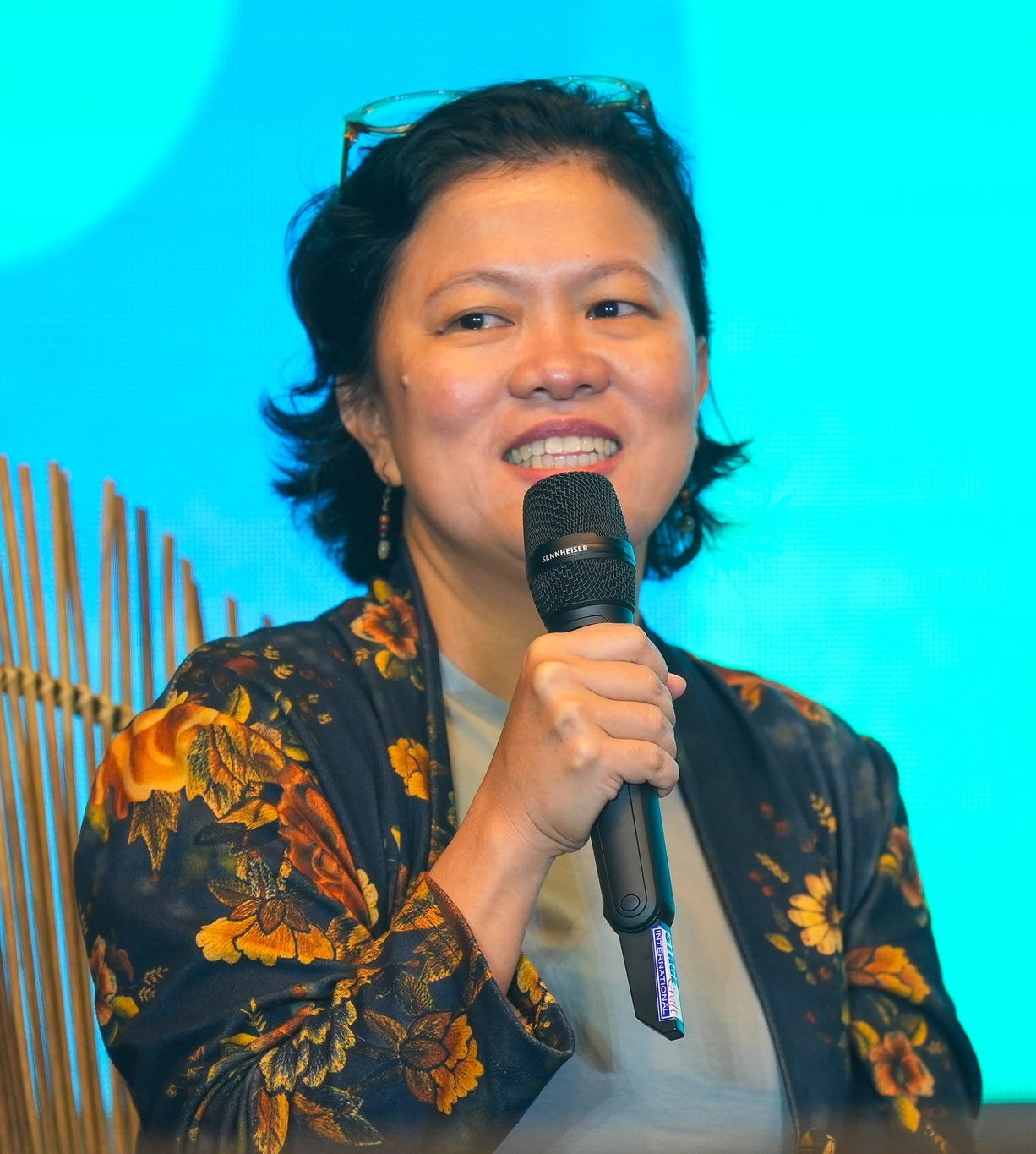
- Jimenez in 2023
- Born: Maria Coreen T. Jimenez
- Occupations: Screenwriter, director, producer, editor
- Employer(s): Arkeofilms; This Side Up
- Known for: Big Time (2005); Kano: An American and His Harem (2010); Apocalypse Child (2015); Respeto (2017); Leonor Will Never Die

Maria Coreen T. Jimenez, better known by her screen name, Monster Jimenez, is a Philippine screenwriter, director, producer and editor best known for her work on Big Time (2005), Kano: An American and His Harem (2010), Apocalypse Child (2015), Respeto (2017), and the Sundance winner Leonor Will Never Die.

Jimenez' directorial debut, 2010's Kano: An American and His Harem, won the best Documentary Awards at the 2010 Cinemalaya International Film Festival, the 2011 Gawad Urian Awards, and the Award for Best First Appearance at the International Documentary Film Festival Amsterdam.

Jimenez also serves as the Managing Partner at the independent film production company Arkeofilms, and as the presiding chairperson of IFC (Philippine Independent Filmmakers Multi-purpose Cooperative).

She now serves as the managing partner of This Side Up, a content creation house that explores original content creation, as well as for brands.
