= Apocalypse Child =

- Official movie poster
- Directed by: Mario Cornejo
- Written by: Mario Cornejo; Monster Jimenez
- Starring: Sid Lucero; Annicka Dolonius; Gwen Zamora; RK Bagatsing; Ana Abad Santos; Archie Alemania
- Cinematography: Ike Avellana
- Production company: Filmex
- Release date: October 23, 2015 (QCinema International Film Festival)
- Country: Philippines
- Language: Filipino

Apocalypse Child is a 2015 Philippine independent film directed and co-written by Mario Cornejo, set in the Philippine coastal town of Baler and featuring aspects of local surf culture. It stars Sid Lucero, Annicka Dolonius, Gwen Zamora, RK Bagatsing, Ana Abad Santos, and Archie Alemania, and was co-written by Mario Cornejo and Monster Jimenez.

== Synopsis ==
Set in the town of Baler, Ford is a surfing instructor who has been wasting his life believing that he is the illegitimate child of the renowned director Francis Ford Coppola. When his childhood best-friend Rich returns as a congressman with his girlfriend Serena, Ford is forced to confront the myth, personal lies and neglected trauma of his past.

== Cast ==
- Sid Lucero as Ford
  - Basti Santos as young Ford
- Annicka Dolonius as Fiona
- Gwen Zamora as Serena
- RK Bagatsing as Rich
- Ana Abad Santos as Chona
- Archie Alemania as Jordan
- Fernando Ortegas as Governor Vicente Magsanoc
- Felipa Ritual as Aling Jess

== Production ==
=== Development ===
Apocalypse Child initially had a different title and a different story, still written by Mario Cornejo and Monster Jimenez. The film's original plot revolved around four middle-aged women who went on to learn about surfing because they fell in love with a young surf instructor.

But they changed the plot as soon as they went to Baler, Aurora to do further research and learn more about the history of surfing in the Philippines. Surf culture in the country, according to an a legend, began because of a Hollywood film. Apocalypse Now shot some of its scenes in Baler in the 1970s and allegedly, the crew left a surfboard floating in the sea. The surfboard was later used by five local boys who taught themselves how to surf and became the first Philippine surfing champions.

Cornejo and Jimenez played around with this myth and incorporated it in their film. What if the Apocalypse Now production team left behind some children as well? This was how the Ford's character came to be, who was led to believe his whole life that he was the son of Apocalypse Now director Francis Ford Coppola. While writing the script, they already had Sid Lucero in mind to play the part. They also explored archetypes such as the favorite daughter, sacrificing mother, the "worst fault", and the father's son.

The final script was submitted to the QCinema Film Festival after which they secured partial funding.

=== Principal photography ===
The film was shot in Baler, Aurora within 20 days with production firm, Filmex helping Cornejo and Jimenez in scheduling the principal photography. The production staff had a four-day break.

== Release ==
Apocalypse Child had its premiere at the QCinema Film Festival in October 2015, about seven months after the script was submitted to the organizers. The film was later screened in film festivals in Italy, New York City and Pittsburgh in the United States, and South Korea. It had its commercial release in Philippine cinemas on October 26, 2016.

== Reception ==
List of accolades
Award / Film Festival	Category	Recipient(s)	Result
QCinema Film Festival Awards 2015
QCinema Film Festival Awards 2015	Best Picture	Apocalypse Child	Won
QCinema Film Festival Awards 2015	Best Director	Mario Cornejo	Won
QCinema Film Festival Awards 2015	Best Artistic Achievement	Lawrence S. Ang	Won
QCinema Film Festival Awards 2015	Best Supporting Actress	Annicka Dolonius	Won
Film Academy of the Philippines Luna Awards 2016	Best Supporting Actress	Ana Abad Santos	Won
Gawad Urian Awards 2016	Best Supporting Actress	Ana Abad Santos	Won
Star Awards for Movies 2016	Indie Movie Cinematographer of the Year	Ike Avellana	Won
Toronto Reel Asian International Film Festival 2016	Fasken Martineau Best Feature Film	Apocalypse Child	Won
