= Kenneth Cobonpue =

Filipino industrial designer (born 1968)

Kenneth Cobonpue 許自欽
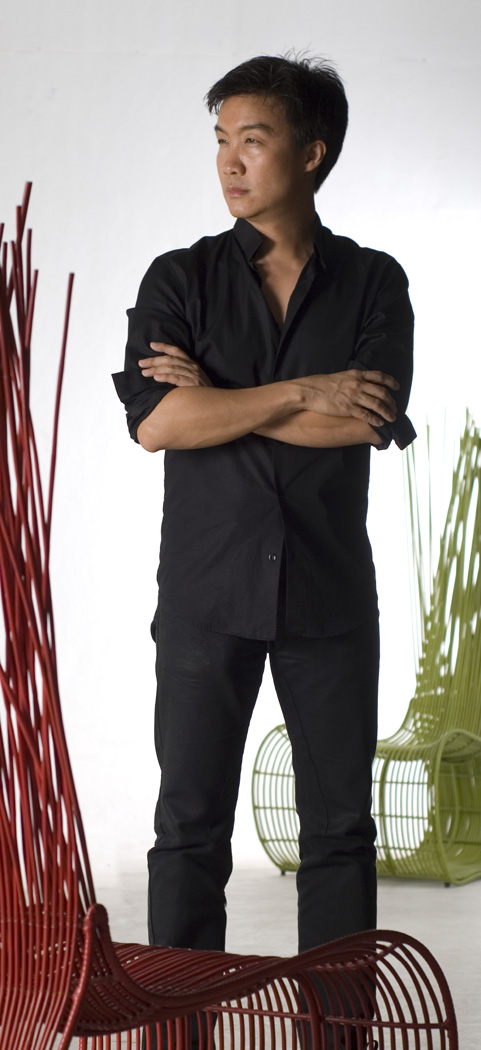
- Kenneth Cobonpue with his Yoda Easy Chairs
- Born: December 16, 1968 (age 57)
- Occupation: Industrial Designer
- Years active: 25
- Known for: Unique designs integrating natural materials through innovative handmade production processes.
- Spouse: Susanne Cobonpue
- Children: 2
- Website: www.kennethcobonpue.com

Kenneth Cobonpue (born December 16, 1968) is a Filipino industrial designer known for his unique designs integrating natural materials through innovative handmade production processes. He began his design career after his studies in Industrial Design in New York, which led him to apprenticeships and further studies in Italy and Germany.

Cobonpue designs have appeared in full-length films such as Ocean's 13 and CSI Miami while his roster of clientele includes Hollywood celebrities and members of royalty like Queen Sofía of Spain, Queen Rania of Jordan, and former couple Angelina Jolie and Brad Pitt. TIME Magazine has called him “rattan’s first great virtuoso."

== Career ==
=== Interior Crafts of the Islands, Inc. (I.C.I) ===
After a series of further studies and apprentices abroad, Kenneth moved back to Cebu in 1996 to help manage their family business founded by his mother, Betty Chen Cobonpue, in 1972. Upon managing the business, Kenneth discovered that by the use of natural fibers and materials as a medium, modern design could have a new face.

=== Government Involvement ===
In March 2017, Cobonpue was appointed by President Rodrigo Duterte as co-chairperson of the National Economic and Development Authority Regional Development Council for Central Visayas. The following year, he became the Creative Director for the Creative Economy Council of the Philippines. He was also assigned as the Private Sector Representative for the Department of Trade and Industry (DTI) for the Design Advisory Council in 2019.

=== Design Education and Mentorship for Young Designers ===
In 2005, Cobonpue founded the Industrial Design Program of the University of the Philippines in Cebu. He also became the chairman and consultant of the Department of Industrial Design at the School of Design and Arts, De La Salle - College of Saint Benilde in 2014.

=== Maison et Objet's Asian Designer of the Year ===
Kenneth Cobonpue was named the first Maison et Objet Designer of the Year for Asia in 2014. The Filipino creative has been awarded the title for his contributions and impact in the field furniture and design—most notably for developing and manufacturing woven rattan furniture for indoor and outdoor use.

=== Gawad sa Sining Award for Design ===
He was honored with the Gawad sa Sining Award 2020, the highest distinction given by the Cultural Center of the Philippines (CCP) to Filipino artists for their contributions to the Philippine Arts and Culture scene. Cobonpue is the first recipient of the award in the field of design.

=== Pratt Legends ===
Kenneth Cobonpue was awarded the Pratt Legends Award of 2023 by the Pratt Institute New York. Cobonpue was recognized for his significant contributions to the global furniture and design industry. Pratt Legends 2023 honorees awarded alongside him include architect Edward Mazria, and artist Kay WalkingStick.

The Legends Awards celebrate distinguished individuals and corporations in the world of art and design, whose notable works and accomplishments resonate with the values and principles upheld by Pratt Institute of New York. Past Legends honorees include Tommy Hilfiger, Marc Jacobs, Nina Campbell, and Santiago Calatrava.

== Timeline of collections ==
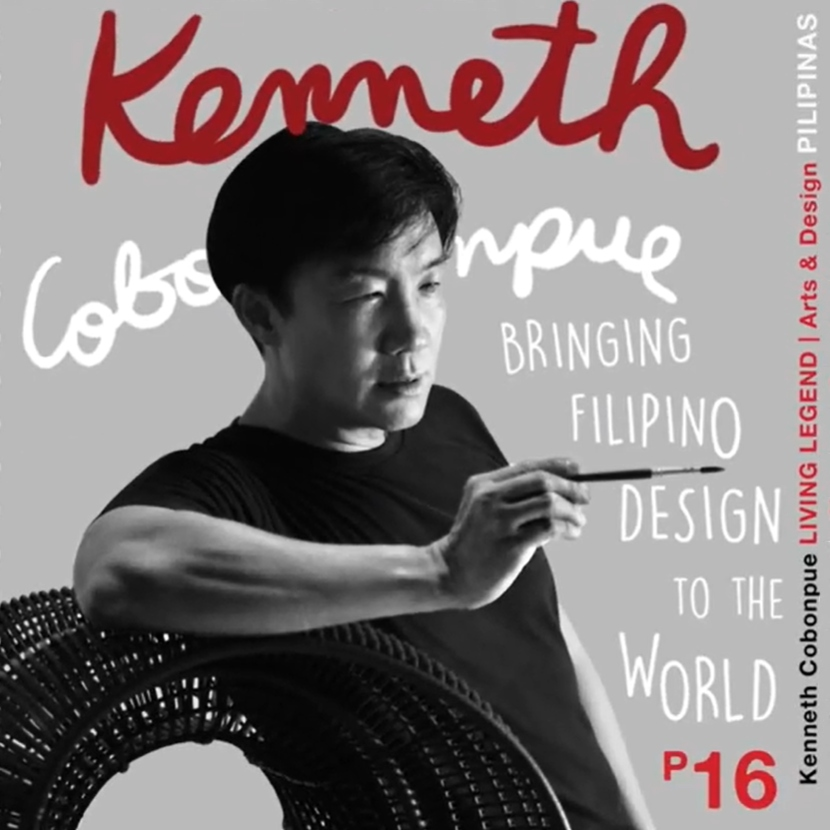
Cobonpue on a 2021 stamp of Philippines

- 1980 – Lotus (patented)
- 1998 – Yin Yang – Cobonpue's first design.
- 1999 – Balou
- 2000 – Pigalle, La Luna
- 2001 – Voyage
- 2002 – Yoda, Croissant, Kabuki, Lulu
- 2003 – Tilt, Matilda, Amaya, Dimple, Lolita, Terra
- 2004 – Chiquita, Lolah, Wave, Pirouette
- 2005 – Stitches, Retaso, Suzy Wong, Kawayan
- 2006 – Dragnet, Dimsum, Link
- 2007 – Kawayan Too, Manolo
- 2008 – Oasis, Noodle, Bouquet, Operetta
- 2009 – Bloom, Harry, Hagia, Freya, Nobu, Vaña
- 2010 – Rapunzel, Ima, Juniper, Ziggy
- 2011 – Cabaret, Papillion, Mermaid, Dream Catcher, Pebble, Giza, Enoki, Tria
- 2012 – Eclipse, Tropez, Zaza, Kaja, Parchment Table, Annika
- 2013 – Parchment, Calyx, Adesso, Trame, Papillion Swing
- 2018 – Star Wars Collection – in collaboration with the Disney Company Philippines
- 2022 – Dolce, Corda, Gingko
- 2023 – Spin

== Furniture Awards ==
- 2003 GOOD DESIGN AWARD, ASEAN Design Collection, Japan Industrial Design Promotion Organization – Voyage Bed and Yin & Yang Armchair
- 2004 FIRST PRIZE, Open Design Category, Singapore International Furniture Design Competition – Croissant Collection
- 2004 GOOD DESIGN AWARD, ASEAN Design Collection, Japan Industrial Design Promotion Organization – Pigalle Easy Armchair, Kabuki Cabinet, One Night Stand Sofa, CUC Me Screen
- 2005 DESIGN FOR ASIA AWARD, Business of Design Week by Hong Kong Design Centre – Lolah Collection
- 2005 DESIGN EXCELLENCE AWARD, Best Seating, 9th Annual IIDA/HD Product Competition – Lolah Outdoor and Dimple Outdoor
- 2005 OUTSTANDING DESIGN, High Point Show – Balou Outdoor
- 2008 OUTSTANDING QUALITY AND DESIGN INNOVATION, Decorex – Lolah Easy Armchair
- 2009 COUP DE COEUR AWARD by Home Magazine, Maison et Objet – Bloom Easy Armchair
- 2011 PRIX D'EXCELLENCE COUP DE COEUR, SIDIM Montreal – Bloom Easy Armchair
- 2012 TOP PICK AWARD for innovation by American Society of Interior Designers (ASID) – Cabaret Sofa
- 2012 ORIGINAL PRODUCTS DESIGN AWARD, Modern Decoration International Media Award – Phoenix
- 2012 BEST OF THE YEAR AWARD, Outdoor Seating by Interior Design – Cabaret Sofa
- 2018 INDIVIDUAL CATEGORY FOR LOUNGE WINNER, IIDA/HD Product Design Competition – Peacock Chair
- 2022 BEST CONTRACT SEATING, NYCxDESIGN Awards – Knit Easy Armchair
- 2022 BEST IN SHOW, Bedroom Category, IFDA High Point Show – Dolce Bed

== Other appearances ==
- International Design Yearbook 2005 (Lawrence King Publishing House of London) curated by Marcel Wanders ISBN 978-1-85669-435-3
- International Design Yearbook 2004 (Lawrence King Publishing House of London) curated by Tom Dixon ISBN 978-1-85669-392-9
- International Design Yearbook 2002 (Lawrence King Publishing House of London) curated by Ross Lovegrove.
- Tropical Living and Tropical Interiors both by Elizabeth Reyes (Periplus Editions) 2002
- New Bedroom Design, 2004 (Daab GmbH) by Marcel Wanders 2005
- 1000 New Designs and Where to Find Them, 2006 (Laurence King Publishing, Ltd.)by Jennifer Hudson ISBN 978-1-85669-466-7
- Tropical Interiors, 2002, (Periplus Editions HK) by Elizabeth Reyes. Pages 93–97
- Design Now!, 2007 (Taschen GmbH) by Charlotte & Peter Fiell ISBN 978-3-8228-5267-5
- Simply Material, 2007, (Viction:Workshop Limited) by Victor Cheung
- Fork, 2007 (Phaidon Press) by Tom Dixon
- Phaidon's new 2007 book, "& FORK," underscores his leading position in the industry.
- Appearance in European television including Deutsche Welle and Dutch TV
- Voyager Bed – “Never gonna leave this Bed” music video by Maroon 5
- International magazines:
1. Wallpaper
2. Newsweek
3. TIME Magazine July 2006 ISSN 0040-781X
- Newspapers: The Washington Post and Shanghai Daily News
- Pigalle Barstool, Lulu Club Chair – “Ocean’s Thirteen”
- Tilt – “CSI: Miami”
- Matilda – “John Wick: Chapter 3—Parabellum”
- Bloom – “Glass Onion: Knives Out Mystery”

Other Media Magazines featuring Kenneth Cobonpue
